= Lubomír Lipský =

Czech actor (1923–2015)

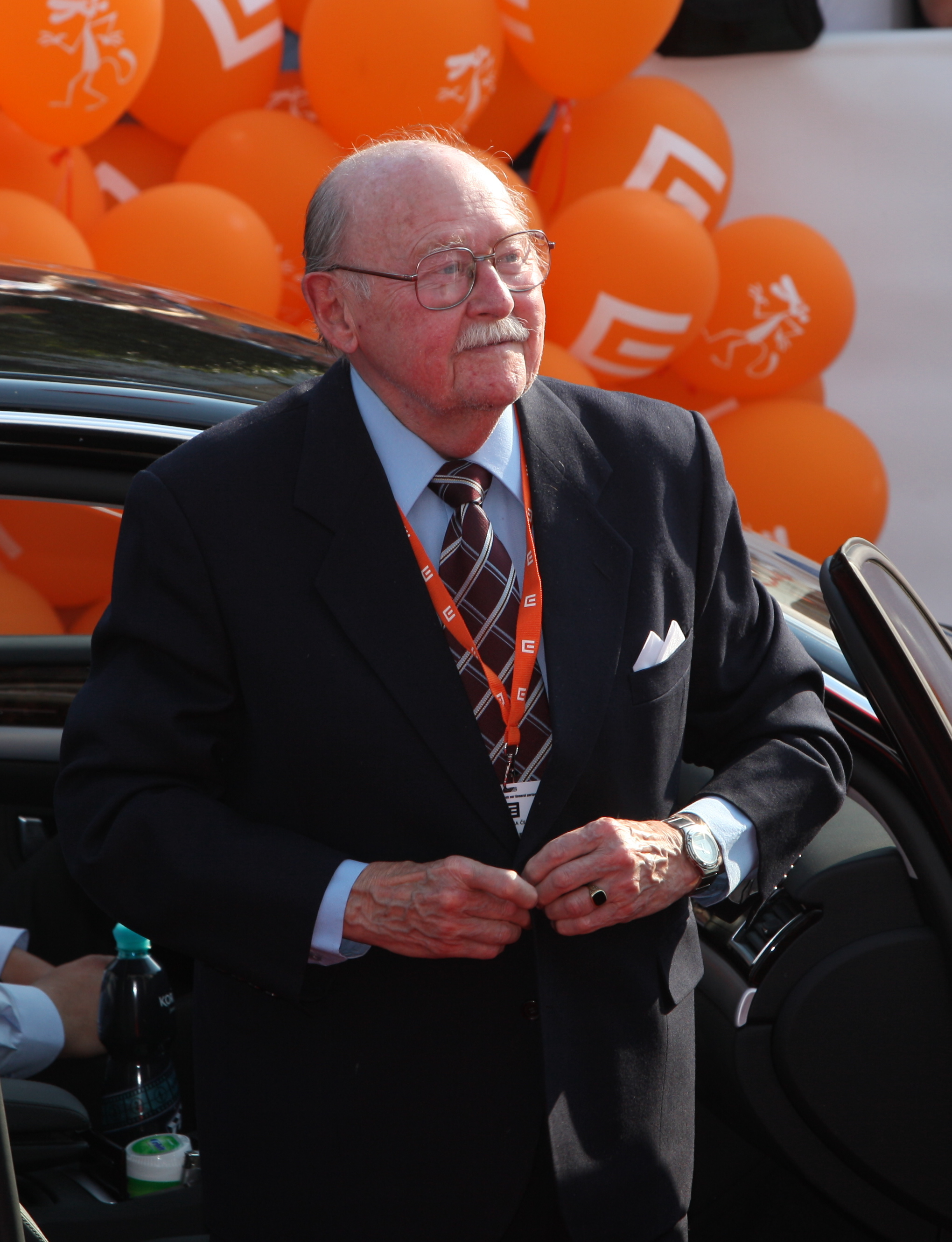
- Lipský in 2009
- Born: 19 April 1923; Pelhřimov, Czechoslovakia
- Died: 2 October 2015 (aged 92); Prague, Czech Republic
- Resting place: Olšany Cemetery, Prague
- Occupation: Actor
- Years active: 1946–2013
- Relatives: Oldřich Lipský (brother)

Lubomír Lipský (19 April 1923 – 2 October 2015) was a Czech actor. He was known primarily for his comedic roles and also established himself as a voice actor. He was an active actor until the end of his life, playing over 300 film and stage roles. His brother was the film director Oldřich Lipský and he played in most of his brother's films.

== Early life and family ==
Lubomír Lipský was born on 19 April 1923 in Pelhřimov. His father was a confectioner and amateur actor. Lubomír had two younger brothers, including the actor Oldřich Lipský. Dalibor, his second brother, died at the age of 16, but appeared as an actor in two films. Lubomír's wife Věra Kittlerová (1926–2003) was a dancer and choreographer. Lipský had two children: a daughter, Taťána (born 1949), who became a translator, and a son, Lubomír Jr. (born 1951–1991), who was a film director. The son of Lubomír Jr., Matěj (born 1976), is a musician.

== Education, theatre and death ==
During his high school studies, Lipský mainly devoted himself to music and played several brass instruments. After he graduated in 1942, Lubomír Lipský, Oldřich Lipský and their friends from the Pelhřimov Gymnasium established the amateur theatre Dramatické studio mladých ('Youth Drama Studio'). From 1945 until its closure in 1949, it was a professional theatre and was called the Theatre of Satire. In 1949–1951, he studied aesthetics and theatre studies at the Faculty of Arts of the Charles University in Prague, but left the school unfinished.

From 1950 to 1990, Lipský was a member of the theatre troupe Městská divadla pražská ('Prague municipal theatres'). From 1996, he was employed in the Divadlo ABC theatre. His most famous stage role was the lead role of Babberly in the Charley's Aunt adaptation, which had over 500 reprises. He played there, despite his advanced age, until his death. He died in a Prague hospital on 2 October 2015, aged 92. He is buried at the Olšany Cemetery.

== Film career ==
Lipský was known for his distinctive humor, comedic skills, and grotesque clowning. In his early film and theatre career, he played primarily in dramas, but later roles in comedies predominated. Among his most memorable roles is the one in the TV series Tři chlapi v chalupě (1961–1963) about the cohabitation of three men, representing three generations. He played there a grandfather because of his appearance, even though he was only 36 years old when filming began. Other notable roles are in the comedies of his brother Oldřich I Killed Einstein, Gentlemen (1970), Four Murders Are Enough, Darling (1971) and Šest medvědů s Cibulkou (1972; comedy for children from a circus setting where he played a clown). Lubomír Lipský played over 200 theatre roles and about 100 film roles.

=== Selected filmography ===
- Thunder in the Hills (1946)
- Premiera (1947)
- Getting on in the World (1948)
- Old Ironside (1948)
- Divá Bára (1949)
- Judgement Day (1949)
- Vítězná křídla (1950)
- The Hen and the Sexton (1950)
- The Emperor and the Golem (1952)
- Racek má zpoždění (1952)
- The Secret of Blood (1953)
- Haškovy povídky ze starého mocnářství (1954)
- Cirkus bude! (1954)
- Nejlepší člověk (1954)
- Byl jednou jeden král... (1955)
- Dog's Heads (1955)
- Music from Mars (1955)
- Návštěva z oblak (1955)
- Leave It to Me (1955)
- Jaroslav Hasek's Exemplary Cinematograph (1956)
- Větrná hora (1956)
- Focus, Please! (1956)
- Hvězda jede na jih (1958)
- O věcech nadpřirozených (1959)
- Zlepšovák (1960, short)
- The Man from the First Century (1962)
- Tři chlapi v chalupě (1963, TV series)
- Lov na mamuta (1964)
- The Treasure of a Byzantine Merchant (1966)
- The Sinful People of Prague (1968, TV series)
- Čest a sláva (1969)
- Šest černých dívek aneb Proč zmizel Zajíc (1969)
- I Killed Einstein, Gentlemen (1970)
- Odvážná slečna (1970)
- Pan Tau (1970, TV series)
- Four Murders Are Enough, Darling (1971)
- Ženy v ofsajdu (1971)
- Metráček (1971)
- Straw Hat (1971)
- F. L. Věk (1971, TV series)
- Šest medvědů s Cibulkou (1972)
- Tři chlapi na cestách (1973)
- Jáchyme, hoď ho do stroje! (1974)
- Circus in the Circus (1975)
- Honza málem králem (1977)
- Long Live Ghosts! (1977)
- Já to tedy beru, šéfe! (1978)
- Tři veteráni (1983)
- Fešák Hubert (1985)
- Velká filmová loupež (1986)
- Trhala fialky dynamitem (1992)
- Saturnin (1994)
- Hospoda (1996–1997, TV series)
- Nebát se a nakrást (1999)
- Návrat ztraceného ráje (1999)
- Poslední plavky (2007)
- Bobule (2008)
- Ulice (2009, TV series)
- 2Bobule (2009)

== Honours and legacy ==
In 2013, Lipský was awarded by the Czech Republic's Medal of Merit (First Class) for services to the state in the field of culture. He has received several other awards for his lifetime achievement, including the Thalia Award for his contribution to theatre, František Filipovský Award for the contribution to voice acting and the Golden Slipper award of the Zlín Film Festival for the contribution to the filmmaking for children and youth.

In Pelhřimov, there is the Lipský family memorial hall "MÚZYum". It contains an exhibition about the life and work of the Lipský brothers, and recalls famous quotes and scenes from their films. The municipal theatre in Pelhřimov bears the name of Lubomír Lipský.

In 2024, an edition of postage stamps featuring Lubomír and Oldřich Lipský was issued to mark the centenary of their birth.
