= František Filipovský =

Czech actor (1907–1993)

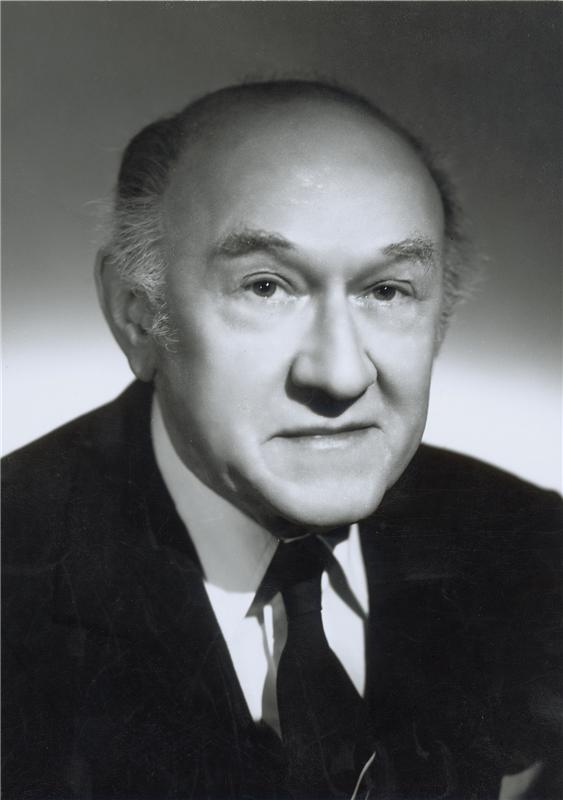
- Filipovský c. 1980
- Born: 23 September 1907; Přelouč, Bohemia, Austria-Hungary
- Died: 26 October 1993 (aged 86); Prague, Czech Republic
- Burial place: Olšany Cemetery
- Occupation: Actor
- Years active: 1932–1993

Signature
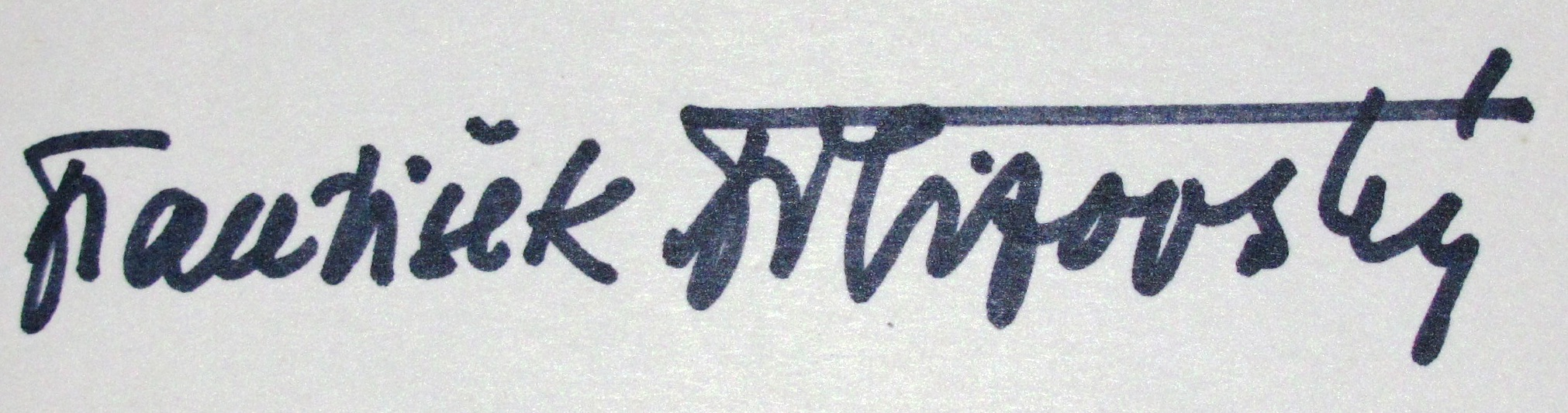

František Filipovský (23 September 1907 – 26 October 1993) was a Czech actor and voice actor. Since 1994, Czech actors have been awarded the annual František Filipovský Award for best voice acting.

== Life and family ==
Filipovský was born on 23 September 1907 in the Czech town of Přelouč, then part of Austria-Hungary. His father was musician František Filipovský Sr., who was 62 at the time his son was born.

Filipovský died on 26 October 1993 in Prague. He is buried at the Olšany Cemetery in Prague.

Filipovský's daughter is actress and singer Pavlína Filipovská. Her daughter is journalist Pavlína Wolfová.

== Career ==
The young Filipovský was interested in acting from an early age and began performing in theatre in the 1930s, with stints in Emil František Burian's Voiceband and at Osvobozené divadlo. Among other engagements, he worked as stage director in Jára Kohout's U Nováků Theatre in 1939, later moving to Švanda Theatre in Smíchov.

From 1945 to 1992, for 47 years, he performed at the National Theatre in Prague. He played mostly small roles, often comic ones. His most famous stage role was that of Harpagon in the adaptation of Molière's The Miser, which the National Theatre staged from 1950.

Throughout his career, Filipovský acted in more than a hundred Czechoslovak films and television productions. He dubbed many roles for the Czech versions of foreign films and became known primarily as the exclusive voice provider for French actor Louis de Funès.

== Legacy ==
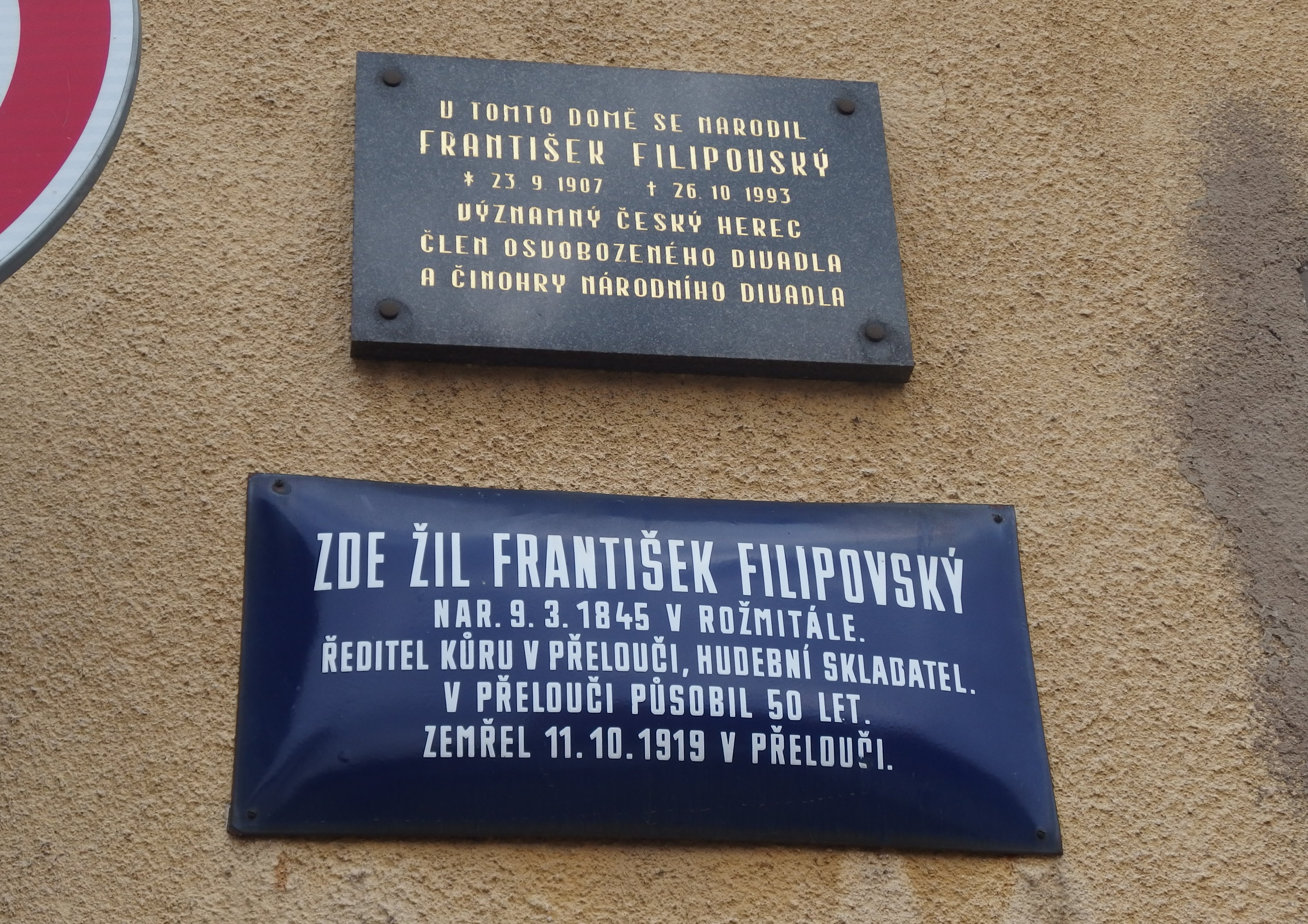
Memorial plaque on Filipovský's birth house in Přelouč

The František Filipovský Awards (Czech: Ceny Františka Filipovského), named after the actor, are an annual Czech prize for voice acting, held in Filipovský's hometown of Přelouč. Officially launched in 1995, an inaugural event was held in 1994, when Filipovský was awarded in memoriam for his lifelong contribution to Czech voice acting.

Filipovského street in Prague's Satalice district is named after the actor.

A memorial plaque was erected at Filipovský's birth house in Přelouč in 1994.

== Selected filmography ==
=== Film ===
List of film appearances, with year, title, and role shown
Year	Title	Role	Notes
1934	Workers, Let's Go	Shuffer	
1934	U nás v Kocourkově	councilor	
1937	Lidé na kře	Agent Hvězda	
1937	Lawyer Vera	Apache	
1937	The World Is Ours	Pinker	
1937	Virginity	Jenda	
1938	Škola základ života	Václav Krhounek	
1939	U pokladny stál...	clerk	
1939	Christian	Dvoráček	
1939	Cesta do hlubin študákovy duše	Mazánek	
1940	Studujeme za školou	accountant	
1940	The Catacombs	Šmíd	
1940	Baron Prášil	waiter	
1940	Pro kamaráda	legal trainee	
1941	Rukavička		
1941	A Charming Man	Jaroslav Stárek	
1941	The Hard Life of an Adventurer	Stařík	
1941	Provdám svou ženu	Zmatlík	
1941	The Blue Star Hotel	accountant	
1941	From the Czech Mills	Krákora	
1941	Turbina		Uncredited
1942	Gabriela	František Kalista	
1942	Ryba na suchu	Rypáček	
1942	Prijdu hned	solicitor	
1942	Městečko na dlani	Stýblo	
1943	Experiment	guest at the vernissage	
1943	Fourteen at the Table	Kilián	
1943	Barbora Hlavsová	Bartyzal	Uncredited
1944	The Respectable Ladies of Pardubice	Flaška	
1945	Prosťáček	tramp	
1945	Rozina, the Love Child	barber	
1946	Řeka čaruje	barber	
1946	The Avalanche	Cerný	
1946	The Heroes Are Silent	Vilém Kolta	
1946	A Big Case	Redaktor	
1947	Čapek's Tales	police agent Pistora	
1947	Nobody Knows Anything	Petr Nivý	
1948	Getting on in the World	servant	
1952	The Emperor and the Golem	court astrologer	
1953	Divotvorný klobouk	judge (voice)	
1953	The Secret of Blood	doctor at lecture	
1954	Haškovy povídky ze starého mocnářství	chaplain	
1954	Komedianti	reeve	
1954	Cirkus bude!	Ostrý	
1956	Muž v povětří	Zatrapa	
1956	Focus, Please!	secretary	
1956	The Good Soldier Schweik	Bretschneider	
1957	I Dutifully Report	Dub	
1958	O věcech nadpřirozených	insurance agent	
1959	Jak se Franta naučil bát	ghost Cyril	
1960	Zpívající pudřenka	Dr. Švarc	
1960	U nás v Mechově	Dr. Hertl	
1961	Procesí k Panence	Prskavec	
1963	Something Different		
1964	Mezi námi zloději	Béďa Musil	
1965	The House in Karp Lane	Alter Kauders	
1966	The Phantom of Morrisville	Doctor Stolly	
1967	The Stolen Airship	judge	
1967	Svatba jako řemen	father of the bride	
1971	You Are a Widow, Sir	King Oscar XV.	
1971	Four Murders Are Enough, Darling	Shediran	
1972	Dívka na koštěti	Roušek	
1974	How to Drown Dr. Mracek, the Lawyer	Bertík Vodička	
1975	Circus in the Circus	reporter	
1976	Marecek, Pass Me the Pen!	Lapáček	
1976	Náš dědek Josef	Jan Pokorný	
1977	Což takhle dát si špenát	Grandfather Liška	
1979	The Ninth Heart	clown	
1979	The Prince and the Evening Star	Kacafírek	
1980	The Tale of John and Mary	dwarves (voices)	
1982	How the World Is Losing Poets	Valerián	
1985	How Poets Are Losing Their Illusions	Valerián	
1986	Young Wine	Marustík	
1988	How Poets Are Enjoying Their Lives	Valerián	

=== Television ===
List of television appearances, with year, title, and role shown
Year	Title	Role	Notes
1968–69	The Sinful People of Prague	Detective Mrázek	10 episodes
1970	Fantom operety	Pianist	4 episodes
1970–74	O klukovi z plakátu	Narrator	11 episodes
1970–75	Pan Tau	Grandfather Urban	14 episodes
1976–77	Thirty Cases of Major Zeman	Bína / Houdek	3 episodes
1976–85	Bakaláři	various	4 episodes
1978	Zákony pohybu	Bohuslav Tomášek	11 episodes
1980	Dnes v jednom dome	Mr. Týfa	5 episodes
1980–81	Arabela	Stunk	8 episodes
1982	Dobrá Voda	wrangler	4 episodes
1983	Létající Čestmír	Koloušek	5 episodes
1984	Bambinot	Joachim	2 episodes
1986	Panoptikum města pražského	Mrázek	3 episodes
1987–88	Jája a Pája	Narrator / Jája / Pája	13 episodes
1988	O Kubovi a Stázině	Kačmar	13 episodes
1993–94	Arabela se vrací	Blekota	3 episodes
