= Stella Zázvorková =

Czech actress

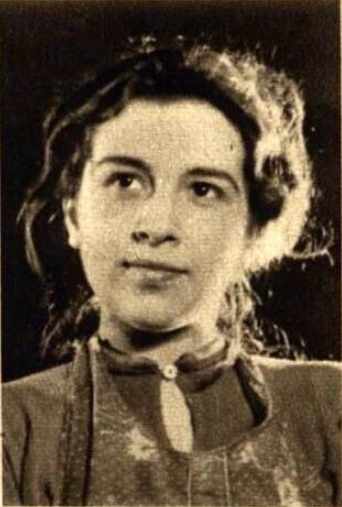
- Born: 14 April 1922; Prague, Czechoslovakia
- Died: 18 May 2005 (aged 83); Prague, Czech Republic
- Occupation: Actress
- Years active: 1955–2005

Stella Zázvorková (14 April 1922 – 18 May 2005) was a Czech actress from Prague.

Zázvorková, an alumnus of Prague's theatre school of E.F. Burian, appeared in more than a hundred films and series. She was married to the actor Miloš Kopecký. She became known abroad through series including Arabela, The Territory of White Deer, and Hospital at the End of the City, and also through her role in the Oscar-winning movie Kolya by Jan Svěrák.

== Filmography ==
Film
Year	Title	Role	Notes
1943	Šťastnou cestu		
1955	Music from Mars	Šimáček's wife	
1955	Návstěva z oblak	Amálie	
1955	Anděl na horách	Mánička Vyhlídková	
1955	Leave It to Me	Richtrová	
1955	Kam s ním		
1956	Muž v povětří		
1956	Větrná hora	Květa Vejdovodá	
1956	Jaroslav Hasek's Exemplary Cinematograph	Slečna na vdávání	
1956	Kudy kam	Karásková	
1956	Focus, Please!	Posahalová	
1957	Robinsonka	Kubátová	
1957	The Good Soldier Schweik (1956 film)	Prostitute with a whip on a table	
1957	Škola otců	Bedrnová	
1957	Tam na konečné		
1957	Florenc 13:30		
1958	Mezi zemí a nebem		
1958	Dnes naposled	Winery visitor	
1959	Hvězda jede na jih	Camper Petioká	
1959	První a poslední	Frantina, Tarbus' wife	
1960	Poteryannaya fotografiya		
1960	Chlap jako hora	Marešová	
1961	Cirkus jede	Dresser	
1961	Procesí k Panence	Vlasta	
1962	Anička jde do školy	Tobacconist	Uncredited
1962	Dva z onoho světa	Assembly participant	
1963	The Cassandra Cat	Růžena	
1963	Tři chlapi v chalupě	Přibylová	
1963	Mezi námi zloději	Landlady Růžena Musilová	
1964	Einstein kontra Babinský	Secretary	
1964	Lemonade Joe	Mother	
1964	Archimedov zákon		
1964	Táto, sežeň štěně	Průvodci tramvaje	
1965	Čintamani & podvodník	Fortune teller (Cintamani)	
1965	Ninety Degrees in the Shade	Shop assistant	
1967	Vrah zo záhrobia	Brániková	
1967	Svatba jako řemen	Mother	
1967	Ta naše písnička česká		
1967	Zmluva s diablom	Pavelková, Marcelina's mother	
1967	Happy End	Mother in law	
1968	The Incredibly Sad Princess	Nanny	
1969	Utrpení mladého Boháčka	Mother	
1969	Larks on a String	Dishwasher	
1969	I Killed Einstein, Gentlemen	Wertheimová	
1970	Odvážná slečna	Anežka Kroupová	
1971	You Are a Widow, Sir	Mary Otisová	
1971	Four Murders Are Enough, Darling	Peggy	
1971	Partie krásného dragouna	Zdychyncová	
1971	Ženy v ofsajdu	Berta	
1972	Straw Hat	Aunt Klotylda	
1972	The Girl on the Broomstick	Vondráčková	
1973	Tři chlapi na cestách	Nedoma's wife	
1974	A Night at Karlstein	Dancer	
1975	How to Drown Dr. Mracek, the Lawyer	Doc. Mráčková, Jindřich's mother	
1975	Hodíme se k sobe, miláčku...?	Emilka	
1975	Dva muži hlásí příchod	Anežka Vávrová	
1975	Tak láska začíná...	Guard	
1976	Stratená dolina	Stella	
1976	Zítra to roztočíme, drahoušku…!	Božena Nováková	
1977	Což takhle dát si špenát	Isabela Lopezová, widow	
1978	Jak se budí princezny	Anežka, the Queen	
1980	Co je doma, to se počítá, pánové...	Božena, store manager, Novák's wife	
1981	The Hit	Villager	
1981	Ten svetr si nesvlíkej	Grandmother	
1984	Oči pro pláč	Irena, the villa owner	
1986	Zkrocení zlého muže	Aunt Andulka	
1986	Velká filmová loupež	Charwoman	
1989	Konec starých časů	Františka	
1993	Chacun pour toi	Mme Kovetch	
1996	Das Zauberbuch	Fortune-teller	
1996	Kolya	Mother	
1999	Helluva Good Luck	Grandmother	
1999	Cosy Dens	Grandmother	
2000	Wild Flowers	Elderly woman	(segment "Štědrý den")
2001	Autumn Spring	Emílie Hánová	
2001	Mach, Šebestová a kouzelné sluchátko	Grandmother Řeháčková	
2005	Román pro ženy	Granny	
2005	Hrubeš a Mareš jsou kamarádi do deště	Miriam Marešová	

TV
Year	Title	Role	Notes
1975	Chalupáři	Brabcová	3 episodes
1980-1981	Arabela	Mrs. Majerová	13 episodes
1981	Hospital at the End of the City	Dobiášová	5 episodes
1991	The Territory of White Deer	Havlíková	7 episodes
