= Miloš Kopecký =

Czech actor

- Born: 22 August 1922; Prague, Czechoslovakia (now Czech Republic)
- Died: 16 February 1996 (aged 73); Prague, Czech Republic
- Occupation: Actor
- Years active: 1947–1996

Miloš Kopecký (Czech) (22 August 1922 in Prague – 16 February 1996 in Prague) was a Czech actor, active mainly in the second half of the 20th century.

== Biography ==
He was born into the family of a furrier; his mother was a hatter. From childhood he was involved with the theatre and music, and after some unsuccessful attempts to study, he chose the career of an actor. He began to appear on the stage in 1939, as a member of an amateur elocution group. During the German occupation of Czechoslovakia he performed with a collective of young artists, Tvar (The Shape). At the end of the Second World War, he was (having one Jewish parent) interned in the labor camp in Bystřice u Benešova. His mother was murdered in the Auschwitz concentration camp. Following the liberation, he took up a career as a professional actor in the avant-garde studio Větrník (from 1945 to 1946), and afterward he was engaged in many Prague theatre scenes. A few years later, he also began to appear in films and gradually became one of the most popular actors in Czechoslovakia. In the mid-1980s Kopecký acted in a politically biased documentary film about emigrants, but, on the other side, he presented a very critical speech against the communist régime in May 1987, at the Fourth Congress of Dramatic Artists. He was married five times, once with Czech actress Stella Zázvorková. For many years Kopecký suffered from manic-depressive disease, partially caused by the death of his mother, who perished in a concentration camp.

== Theatre ==
Following his engagement in Větrník he appeared in various theatre scenes:

- Divadlo satiry (1946–47)
- Studio Národního divadla (1947–48)
- Realistické divadlo (1948–49)
- Národní divadlo (1949–50)
- Městská divadla pražská (1950–51)
- Armádní umělecké divadlo (1951–54)
- Divadlo estrády a satiry (1954–55)
- Divadlo satiry (1955–59)
- Divadlo ABC (1957–60)
- Hudební divadlo v Karlíně (1964–65)

A turning point in his career came in 1965, when the director František Pavlíček engaged him to the Divadlo na Vinohradech, to which he remained faithful throughout the rest of his life. Nonetheless, he acted as a guest also in other theatres, e.g. in Semafor Theatre, or in Divadlo ABC (ABC Theatre), where he cooperated with another important actor of the time, Jan Werich. Among his most valued roles were Paolino in Pirandello's The Man, The Beast and The Virtue, Professor Higgins in G. B. Shaw's Pygmalion, Harpagon in Molière's The Miser, and many others.

== Film ==
Kopecký was a passionate admirer of film from an early age, and began to appear on screen shortly after the war. His first minor role was in the historic film Jan Roháč z Dubé (1947), but he quickly graduated to more important characters. During his career he played mainly negative roles of bon vivants, elegant intriguers, traitors, debauchees, lechers and villains, which he managed to depict with great elegance and esprit. Among his most valued roles in film were Chaplain Katz in The Good Soldier Švejk (1956), Hogofogo in Limonádový Joe (1964), the chief of the Czech water-goblins in Jak utopit dr. Mráčka aneb Konec vodníků v Čechách (1974), the villainous Count von Kratzmar in Adéla ještě nevečeřela (1977), and many others. He may be best known today as Dr. Štrosmajer in the Czech television series Nemocnice na kraji města.

== Selected filmography ==
- 1947: Jan Rohác z Dube - Student
- 1947: Don't You Know of an Unoccupied Flat? - Komisar
- 1948: Az se vrátís - Soused
- 1949: Návrat domù
- 1949: Cervená jesterka - Vinárník
- 1949: Revolucni rok 1848 - Komorník u Portheima
- 1950: Daleká cesta - Prisoner building a gas chamber #1
- 1951: Posel úsvitu - Doctor Held
- 1952: The Emperor and the Golem - Alchemist 2
- 1952: Mikolás Ales
- 1952: The Proud Princess - Chancellor
- 1952: Velké dobrodruzství - Cecil Rhodes
- 1953: Únos - Rychman
- 1953: Anna Proletářka - Komisar
- 1953: Tajemství krve - Lékar na prednásce
- 1954: Kavárna na hlavní tríde - Matejka, redaktor
- 1954: Olovený chléb - Policejní komisar
- 1954: Severní prístav - Berka
- 1954: Cirkus bude! - klaun Tonda
- 1954: Nejlepší člověk - lekárník Valérian Kýla
- 1955: Byl jednou jeden král - Smart prince
- 1955: Dog's Heads - Kos, správce
- 1955: Jan Hus - Biskupský Kanclér
- 1956: Jan Žižka - Sir from Sternberk
- 1956: Větrná hora - Melichar Hnátek
- 1956: Stříbrný vítr - Gerlic, nadporucík
- 1957: Dědeček automobil - Albert de Dion
- 1957: Legenda o lásce - Prodavachat na kilimi
- 1957: The Good Soldier Schweik - Katz, feldkurát
- 1958: Stenata - Magistrate
- 1958: Mezi zemí a nebem - Leopold
- 1959: O věcech nadpřirozených - Graphologist Jensen (segment "The Secret of a Handwriting")
- 1959: Hvězda jede na jih - Soustek - tourist guide
- 1959: Občan Brych - Kamil Tajchman
- 1959: Sny na nedeli - pacient Voves, Jindruv kamarád
- 1960: Zpívající pudrenka - Krásný Venca
- 1960: Konec cesty - Jirák
- 1960: Vstup zakázán - Saboteur (segment "The Chase") (voice)
- 1961: Cirkus jede - Klaun Mrskoc
- 1961: The Fabulous Baron Munchausen - Emil Tuma / Emil Tuma Sr.
- 1962: Man in Outer Space - Josef, calouník
- 1962: Kolik slov stací lásce? - Frantisek Habrada
- 1962: The Fabulous Baron Munchausen - Baron Munchausen
- 1962: Dva z onoho sveta - Psychiatr
- 1962: Kočár nejsvětější svátosti (TV Movie) - secretary Martinez
- 1963: The King of Kings - Izmail el Sarif ben Serfi
- 1964: Lemonade Joe - Horác Badman Alias 'hogofogo'
- 1965: Lov na mamuta - Doktor
- 1965: Bílá paní - Tajemník MNV
- 1966: U telefonu Martin - Havrda
- 1966: Flám - Jirí Donát
- 1967: Zenu ani kvetinou neuhodís - Muz za novinami
- 1967: Ta nase písnicka ceská - Johanes
- 1967: Kdyz má svátek Dominika - Nácelník detektivu
- 1967: Sedm žen Alfonse Karáska (TV Movie) - Alfons Karásek
- 1968: Přísně tajné premiéry - Müller
- 1968: Objízdka - Narrator (voice)
- 1969: Prazske noci - Fabricius (segment "Fabricius and Zuzana")
- 1969: Slasti Otce vlasti - Jan Lucemburský
- 1969: Já, truchlivý bůh - Adolf
- 1969: Trapasy (TV Short) - Milos Kopecký
- 1970: I Killed Einstein, Gentlemen - Wertheim
- 1971: You Are a Widow, Sir - Professor Somr, majítel sanatoria
- 1971: Svatby pana Voka - Petr Vok z Rozmberka
- 1971: Vražda v hotelu Excelsior - Arno Hnízdo, reditel hotelu
- 1971: The Tricky Game of Love - Francesco Vergellesi (segment "Arabský kun")
- 1971: Svět otevřený náhodám - Rataj
- 1971: Alfons Karásek v lázních (TV Short) - Alfons Karásek
- 1972: Straw Hat - Maurice Fadinard
- 1972: Sest medvedu s Cibulkou - Svihák
- 1972: Lakomec (TV Movie) - Harpagon
- 1973: A Night at Karlstein - Duke Stepan of Bavaria
- 1974: Jak utopit doktora Mráčka aneb Konec vodníků v Čechách - Wassermann
- 1976: Zítra to roztočíme, drahoušku…! - Evzen Novák
- 1976: To byla svatba, strýčku! (TV Movie) - Alfons Karásek
- 1977: Nemocnice na kraji města (TV Series)
- 1977: Nás dedek Josef - Baron
- 1978: Dinner for Adele - Rupert von Kratzmar
- 1979: Já už budu hodný, dědečku! - herec Theodor Bergner
- 1979: Božská Ema - cechoamerikan Herold Samuel
- 1980: Causa králík - Dr. Oldrich Lukásek
- 1980: Jak napálit advokáta - JUDr. Horic
- 1980: Úteky domu - MUDr. Karel Chrástek
- 1980: V hlavni roli Oldrich Novy - Himself
- 1981: Zakázaný výlet - Klavírista
- 1981: Zralé víno - Weber
- 1981: The Mysterious Castle in the Carpathians - Baron Gorc z Gorcu
- 1981: Křtiny - Ing. Ciruvka
- 1983: Srdečný pozdrav ze zeměkoule - Prof. Horowitz
- 1983: Zbohom, sladké driemoty - Director
- 1983: Angel in a Devil's Body - sekcní séf min. financí Boura
- 1984: Tři veteráni - 1. Skritek
- 1984: Tajna starog tavana - Boss
- 1984: Bambinot (TV Series) - Mitropulos
- 1984: Prodloužený čas - Prof. Svozil
- 1984: Barrandovské nocturno aneb Jak film zpíval a tancil - Self - entertainer
- 1986: Carovné dedictví - Vetesník
- 1986: Zkrocení zlého muže - Bayer
- 1986: Velká filmová loupez - Dr. Strosmajer
- 1986: Spanelská paradentóza - Onkel Tobias
- 1987: Poslední leč Alfonse Karáska (TV Movie) - Alfons Karásek
- 1988: Anděl svádí ďábla - Minister
- 1989: Utopím si ho sám (TV Movie) - Choun
- 1991: Labyrinth - Rabbi Löw
- 1991: Mí Prazané mi rozumeji - Giacomo Casanova
- 1992: The Valley of Stone - Judge Escher
- 1992: Uctivá poklona, pane Kohn (TV Mini-Series) - Munk
- 1993: Kanarska spojka - Don Padre
- 1994: Andelské oci - Krause
- 1995: The Dance Teacher - Grandfather of Richard
- 1996: Das Zauberbuch - Regent
