= Karel Effa =

Czech actor (1922–1993)

- Born: Karel Effenberger; 23 May 1922; Prague, Czechoslovakia
- Died: 11 June 1993 (aged 71); Prague, Czech Republic
- Occupation: Actor

Karel Effa (born Karel Effenberger; 23 May 1922 – 11 June 1993) was a Czech character actor who appeared in some 65 films.

== Selected filmography ==
- Uloupená hranice (1947) – Závodcí
- The Last of the Mohicans (1947)
- Parohy (1947)
- Znamení kotvy (1947)
- Ves v pohranicí (1948) – Jarda
- Muzikant (1948) – Musician
- Old Ironside (1948) – Seller
- Cervená jesterka (1949)
- Pan Novák (1949) – Vasek Kunc
- Rodinné trampoty oficiála Trísky (1949)
- Distant Journey (1950) – Prisoner building a gas chamber #2
- The Proud Princess (1952) – Guard of King's treasure
- Únos (1953) – American journalist
- Nad námi svítá (1953) – Kuba
- Haskovy povidky ze stareho mocnarstvi (1954) – Porotce
- Cirkus bude! (1954) – Taxikár Karel
- Music from Mars (1955) – Kulhánek, hrác na cello a kytaru
- Muž v povětří (1956) – Postman
- Vzorný kinematograf Haska Jaroslava (1956)
- Synove hor (1956) – Photographer
- Florenc 13:30 (1957) – Mr. Konícek
- O věcech nadpřirozených (1959) – Detective (segment "The Secret of a Handwriting")
- Hvězda jede na jih (1959) – Egon Zejda – guitarist
- May Stars (1959) – Řezník
- The Princess with the Golden Star (1959) – Adjutant of King Kazisvet
- Poteryannaya fotografiya (1959)
- Cerná sobota (1959)
- Pochodne (1961) – Dozorce ve vezení
- Procesí k Panence (1961) – chalupník Slapák
- Kazdá koruna dobrá (1961) – False medium
- Florián (1961)
- The Fabulous Baron Munchausen (1962) – Adjutant
- Velká cesta (1963) – Arcivédova
- The Cassandra Cat (1963) – druzstevník Janek
- Lemonade Joe (1964) – Pancho Kid – Gunslinger
- The Secret of the Chinese Carnation (1964)
- A Jester's Tale (1964) – Varga
- Ztracená tvár (1965)
- Who Wants to Kill Jessie? (1966) – Pistolník
- The Pipes (1966) – Pastor
- The Stolen Airship (1967) – Gustav – Cerny
- Martin a devet bláznu (1967) – Kvasnák
- The Incredibly Sad Princess (1968) – Nápadník
- Automat na prání (1968)
- I Killed Einstein, Gentlemen (1970) – Zástupce velitele policie
- On the Comet (1970) – Kaprál Ben
- You Are a Widow, Sir (1971) – Zrízenec na patologii
- Four Murders Are Enough, Darling (1971) – Kovarski
- Straw Hat (1972) – Mayor
- Zlatá svatba (1972) – drobný chovatel Choleva
- Aféry mé zeny (1973) – kostlivec – segment Vrazda Certove Mlýne
- Tri chlapi na cestách (1973) – Valchar
- A Night at Karlstein (1974) – Varlet
- Circus in the Circus (1975) – Veterinár
- Almost King (1977) – Robber
- Long Live Ghosts! (1977) – Mládek
- Good-for-Nothing (1978) – Hofgesellschaft
- Dinner for Adele (1978) – Baddy / Veteran
- Deváté srdce (1979) – Chamberlain
- Hodinárova svatební cesta korálovým morem (1979)
- Buldoci a tresne (1981) – Pepa
- Amadeus (1984)
- ...a zase ta Lucie! (1984) – Electrician
- The Feather Fairy (1985) – Prinzipal
- Falosny princ (1985) – Vezír
- Figurky ze smantu (1987) – waiter Liborek (segment "Návraty")
