= Josef Kemr =

Czech actor (1922–1995)

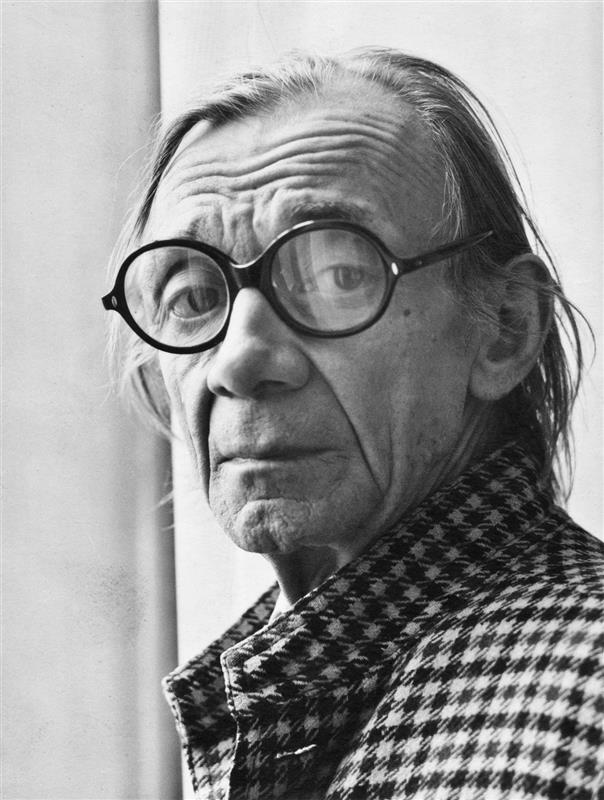
- Josef Kemr
- Born: 20 June 1922; Prague, Czechoslovakia
- Died: 15 January 1995 (aged 72); Prague, Czech Republic
- Occupation: Actor
- Years active: 1937–1995

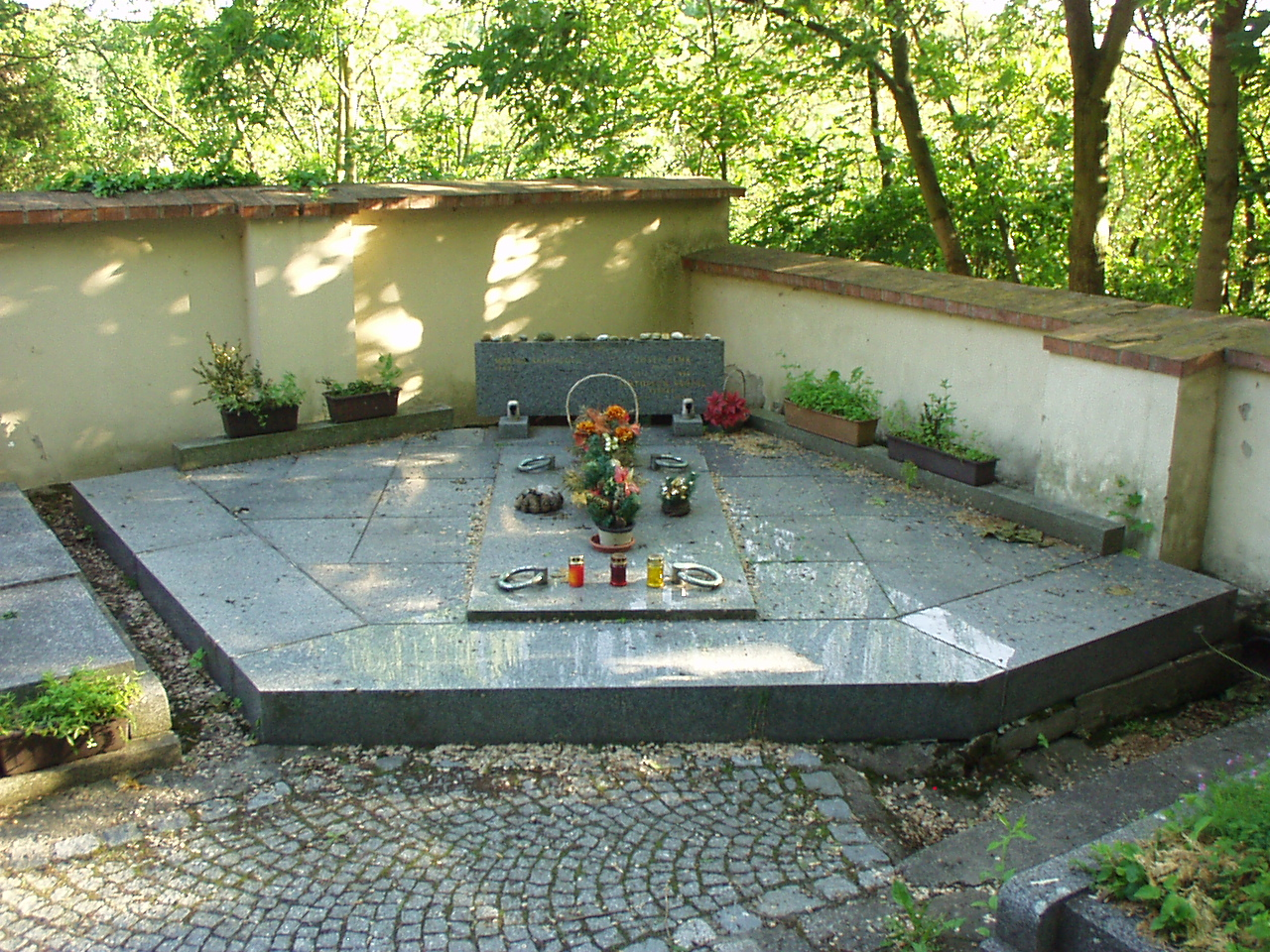
Grave at the Šárka Cemetery

Josef Kemr (20 June 1922 – 15 January 1995) was a Czech actor. He starred in the 1969/1970 film Witchhammer under director Otakar Vávra.

== Selected filmography ==
- Lízin let do nebe (1937) - Jula Plichta
- Škola základ života (1938) - tercián Vávra
- Klapzubova jedenáctka (1938) - Kid Kicking Soccer Ball
- Jarka a Věra (1938) - Boy
- Druhé mládí (1938)
- Malí velcí podvodníci (1938)
- Tulák Macoun (1939) - Child
- Cesta do hlubin studákovy duse (1939)
- Lízino štěstí (1939) - Jula
- Bílá jachta ve Splitu (1939)
- Studujeme za školou (1939) - Václav Pelísek
- To byl český muzikant (1940)
- Prosím, pane profesore (1940) - Mysák, student
- Poznej svého muže (1940) - Pikolík
- Pro kamaráda (1940) - Císník v baru
- Rukavička (1941)
- Provdám svou ženu (1941) - Poslícek z kvetinárství
- Pantáta Bezoušek (1941) - Pepík
- Střevíčky slečny Pavlíny (1941)
- Městečko na dlani (1942)
- Valentin Dobrotivý (1942)
- Bláhový sen (1943)
- Barbora Hlavsová (1943) - Student (uncredited)
- Jarní píseň (1944) - Sklar (uncredited)
- Paklíč (1944) - Chlapec na kole (uncredited)
- Rozina sebranec (1945) - Sklár
- Třináctý revír (1946)
- Pancho se žení (1946)
- Alena (1947) - Young Man in Street
- Portáši (1947)
- Don't You Know of an Unoccupied Flat? (1947) - Bytový optimista
- Nikdo nic neví (1947) - Controller
- Tři kamarádi (1947) - Delník na silnici
- O ševci Matoušovi (1948)
- Dravci (1948)
- Muzikant (1948)
- Návrat domů (1948)
- Poesie pouti (1948, Short)
- Divá Bára (1949) - Josífek
- Zelená knížka (1949) - Thief with a suitcase
- Soudný den (1949)
- Rodinné trampoty oficiála Tříšky (1949)
- Dva ohně (1950) - Karel
- V trestném území (1951) - mechanik Jaroslav Horák
- Veselý souboj (1951) - Emilek Veselka, laborant
- Slepice a kostelník (1951) - Smisek
- Štika v rybníce (1951) - Chaloupka
- Císařův pekař a pekařův císař (1952) - Alchemist breaking atom lead
- Haškovy povídky ze starého mocnářství (1952) - Ucitel
- Anna proletářka (1953) - Unhappy Man
- Dovolená s Andělem (1953) - Bohous Vyhlídka - joiner
- Divotvorný klobouk (1953) - Painter Antonín Strnad
- Tajemství krve (1953) - Aggressive Psychiatric Patient
- Přicházejí z tmy (1953) - Tomek
- Cirkus bude! (1954) - krotitel Jarda Hájek
- Frona (1954) - Havranek
- Nejlepší člověk (1954) - Cukner
- Jan Hus (1955) - Jesek
- Hudba z Marsu (1955) - Veselý, hrác na cinely
- Anděl na horách (1955) - Bohous Vyhlídka
- Jan Žižka (1956) - Jesek -Student
- Oplatky (1955)
- Vzorný kinematograf Haška Jaroslava (1956)
- Větrná hora (1956) - paleontologist Frantisek Jezek
- Vina Vladimíra Olmera (1956) - Koutný - Mirek's brother
- Zaostřit, prosím! (1956) - Prehrsle
- Dobrý voják Švejk (1957) - Vyssí voják z eskorty
- Tam na konečné (1957) - Mr. Brzobohatý
- Schůzka o půl čtvrté (1957, Short) - Frantisek
- Poučení (1957, Short) - Husband
- Konec jasnovidce (1957, Short) - Karel Vanícek
- Páté kolo u vozu (1958) - Petránek - secretary
- Kasaři (1958) - pokladník Krumpera
- O věcech nadpřirozených (1959) - Psychiatrist #2 (segment "A Halo")
- Občan Brych (1959)
- Útěk ze stínu (1959) - Kadavý - kupec auta
- Hry a sny (1959)
- Slečna od vody (1959) - Officer Dvorák
- Jak se Franta naučil bát (1959, Short) - Ghost Bonifác
- Zpívající pudřenka (1960) - Lojza
- Probuzení (1960)
- U nás v Mechově (1960) - Cabinet-maker Gustav Veverka
- Zkouška pokračuje (1960) - herec Karel Cízek
- Zlé pondělí (1960) - Man in Coat
- Zlepšovák (1960, Short)
- Černá sobota (1961)
- Valčík pro milión (1961) - Taxikár
- Procesí k Panence (1961) - Josef Houzvickuv syn
- Hledá se táta (1961) - kuchar Houdek, zadatel o adopci
- Tri razy svitá ráno (1961) - 2. Fako - Duro Mrvenica
- Pohádka o staré tramvaji (1961) - Básník
- Velká cesta (1963) - Tajný
- Král Králů (1963) - Psenicka
- Tři chlapi v chalupě (1963) - Redaktor
- Lucie (1963) - predseda závodního výboru Josef Pastor
- Dábelská jízda na kolobezce (1963) - Teacher
- Mezi námi zloději (1964) - Paroubek; chairman of JZD
- Starci na chmelu (1964) - Chairman of JZD
- Drahý zesnulý (1964, TV Short)
- Příběh dušičkový (1964, TV Movie) - Chramostejl
- Pět hříšníků (1964) - official Bláha
- Prípad Barnabáš Kos (1965) - Barnabas Kos
- Lov na mamuta (1965) - Professor
- Poklad byzantského kupce (1967) - Houska - Kamila's father
- Marketa Lazarová (1967) - Kozlík
- Lucerna (1967, TV Movie) - Michal, Water Sprite
- Noc nevěsty (1967) - Pastor
- Jak se zbavit Helenky (1968) - Professor Slavik
- Zločin a trik II. (1968, TV Movie)
- Šíleně smutná princezna (1968) - Iks
- Muž, který stoupl v ceně (1968) - Vrchní úcetní v nicírne
- Jarní vody (1968)
- Spravedlnost pro Selvina (1968, TV Movie) - Notary
- Maratón (1968) - Man with glasses
- Bouřka (1968, TV Mini-Series)
- Čest a sláva (1968) - Captain
- Šest černých dívek aneb Proč zmizel Zajíc (1969) - Kustod
- Hříšní lidé města pražského (1969, TV Series) - Ahmer Kanelitopulos
- Kladivo na čarodějnice (1970) - Ignác
- Zabil jsem Einsteina, pánové (1970) - Professor Hughes
- Odvážná slečna (1970) - JUDr. Frantisek Kroupa
- Ezop (1970) - filozof Xantos
- Žižkův meč (1970, TV Movie)
- Tvář pod maskou (1970) - Pepek
- Pinocchiova dobrodružství II. (1970, TV Movie)
- Čtyři vraždy stačí, drahoušku! (1971) - Zubaty
- Babička (1971, TV Movie) - Dohazovac
- Touha Sherlocka Holmese (1971) - Timpanist
- Kam slunce nechodí (1971, TV Movie) - Dr. Bryza
- F. L. Věk (1971, TV Series) - Jindrich
- Chléb a písně (1971)
- Slaměný klobouk (1972) - Servant Felix
- Smrt černého krále (1972) - Franc Florián
- The Stolen Battle (1972) - Karl von Lothringen
- Tie malé výlety (1972)
- Dream City (1973) - Castringius
- Chalupáři (1975, TV Series) - Bohous Císar
- Prodaná nevěsta (1976) - Indian
- Na samotě u lesa (1976) - deda Komárek
- Marečku, podejte mi pero! (1976) - Plha
- Parta hic (1977) - Hnízdo
- Honza málem králem (1977) - Drummer
- Náš dědek Josef (1977) - Francek, syn Oujezdského
- Talíře nad Velkým Malíkovem (1977) - LU-PU
- Hop - a je tu lidoop (1978) - Genie
- Proč nevěřit na zázraky (1978) - Dedecek Mráz
- Tajemství proutěného košíku (1978, TV Series) - Deda Karas
- Od zítřka nečaruji (1978) - (archive footage)
- Deváté srdce (1979) - Toncka's Father
- Báječní muži s klikou (1979) - Benjamín Furore, Aloisiin otec
- Já jsem Stěna smrti (1979) - Jarda Piskácek
- Na pytlácké stezce (1979) - Pernikar
- Božská Ema (1979) - Dirigent vesnické kapely
- AEIOU (1980) - Secret policeman
- Paragraf 224 (1980) - ing. Placek
- Blázni, vodníci a podvodníci (1981) - Jirousek
- Za trnkovým keřem (1981) - Zmiják Pernikár
- Opera ve vinici (1981) - Fanos Hrebacka-Mikulecký
- Plaché příběhy (1982) - Hlídac Kníze (segment "Modrá chryzantéma")
- Dobrá voda (1982, TV Series) - Hanousek
- Za humny je drak (1983) - Grandfather Patocka
- Vinobraní (1984) - Grandfather dobes
- Pasáček z doliny (1985) - Deda
- Všichni musí být v pyžamu (1985) - otec Rehor Marsícek
- S čerty nejsou žerty (1985) - Count
- Osudy dobrého vojáka Svejka (1986) - Flanderka (voice)
- Smích se lepí na paty (1987) - ucitel Kroupa
- MÁG (1987)
- The Last Butterfly (1991) - Stadler
- Rama dama (1991) - Dr. Bisenius
- Stavení (1991) - Old man
- Wolfgang A. Mozart (1991)
- Zpověď Dona Juana (1991)
- Krvavý román (1993) - Policejní Komisár
- V erbu lvice (1994) - Mad monk
- Pevnost (1994) - Petrasek
- Golet v údolí (1994) - Lejb Fajnermann
- My Mother's Courage (1995)
- Malostranské humoresky (1996) - Dissident writer Kadlus (final film role)
