= Blažena Holišová =

Czech actress (1930–2011)

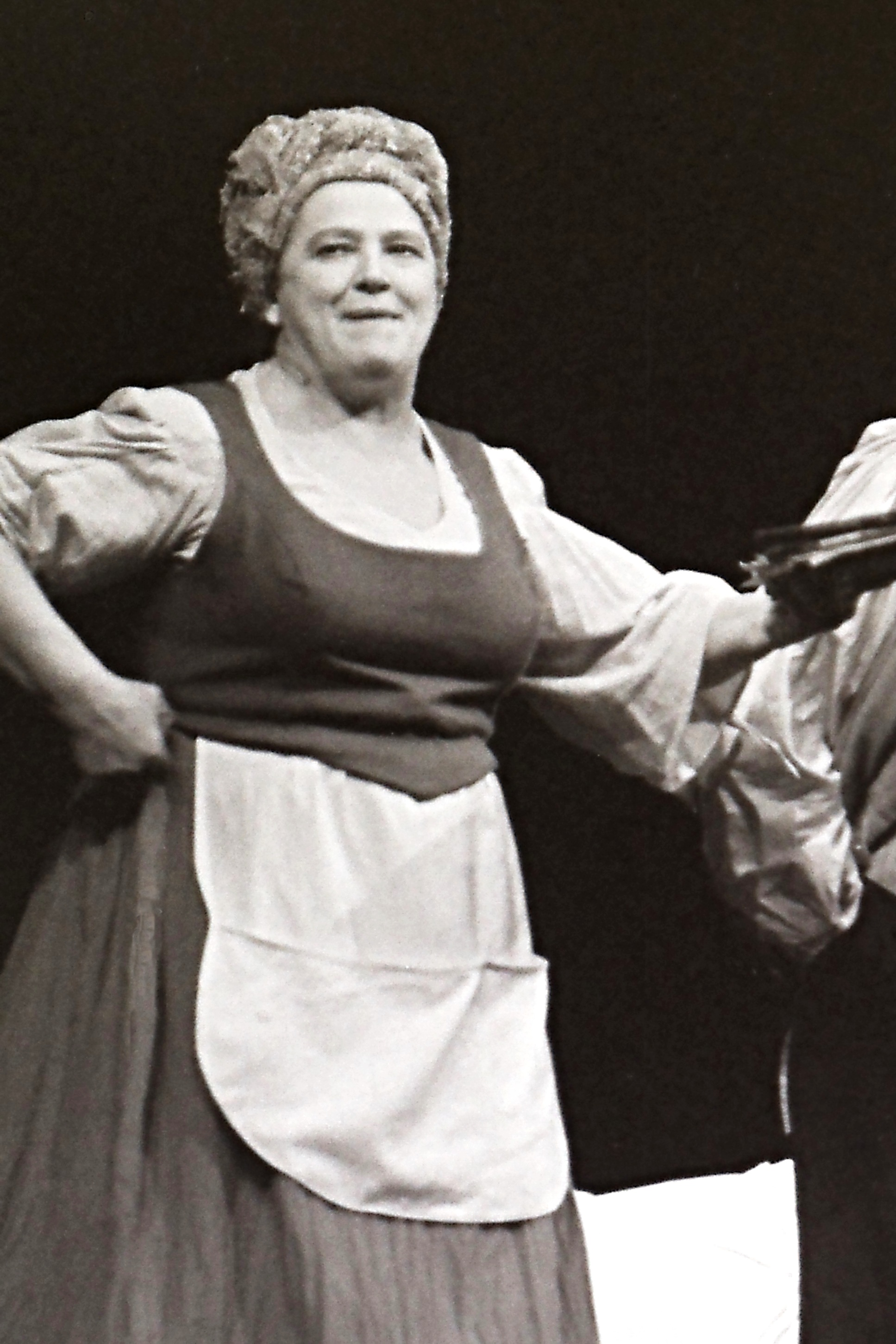
- Born: 11 July 1930; Nenkovice, Czechoslovakia
- Died: 7 April 2011 (aged 80); Prague, Czech Republic
- Occupation: Actress
- Years active: 1957–2003

Blažena Holišová (11 July 1930 – 7 April 2011) was a Czech actress. She starred in the 1969/1970 film Witchhammer under director Otakar Vávra. Holisová died on 7 April 2011. She was 80 years old.

== Partial filmography ==
- Skola otcu (1957) - Andulka Novotná
- Touha (1958)
- Zivot pro Jana Kaspara (1959) - Jana Vánová
- U nás v Mechově (1960) - Ema Sikulová
- Pohled do ocí (1961) - Hanka Vitáková
- Death is Called Engelchen (1963) - rádová sestra Alzbeta
- Marie (1964)
- Zlatá reneta (1965) - Karla Skálová, Martina sestra
- Dva tygri (1968) - Lebedová
- Witchhammer (1970) - Sattlerová
- Hroch (1973)
- Kdo hledá zlaté dno (1974) - Petrina matka
- Dvacátý devátý (1974) - Marie Zápotocká
- My Brother Has a Cute Brother (1975) - Vránová
- Prodaná nevesta (1976) - Krusinová
- Bájecní muzi s klikou (1979) - vdova Evzenie Slavíková
- Brácha za vsechny penize (1979) - Vránová, matka Zuzany
- Indiáni z Vetrova (1979) - Uklízecka
- Julek (1980) - Director of Arena
- Úteky domu (1980) - Matka
- Pul domu bez zenicha (1981) - Zofie, Francova zena
- Zlatá slepice (1981) - Aunt
- Zahrada deti (1981) - Eliska Vondrová
- Pozor, vizita! (1982) - Katka
- Poslední vlak (1983) - Sanderová
- Slavnosti sněženek (1984) - Francova zena
- Rozpuštěný a vypuštěný (1985) - Matka Hlavácková
- Zátah (1985) - Pokladní
- Kam doskáce ranní ptáce (1987) - domovcine Mrázová
- Mág (1988) - Máchova matka
- Jak básníkům chutná život (1988) - Hubácková
