= Zvonimir Rogoz =

Croatian actor (1887–1988)

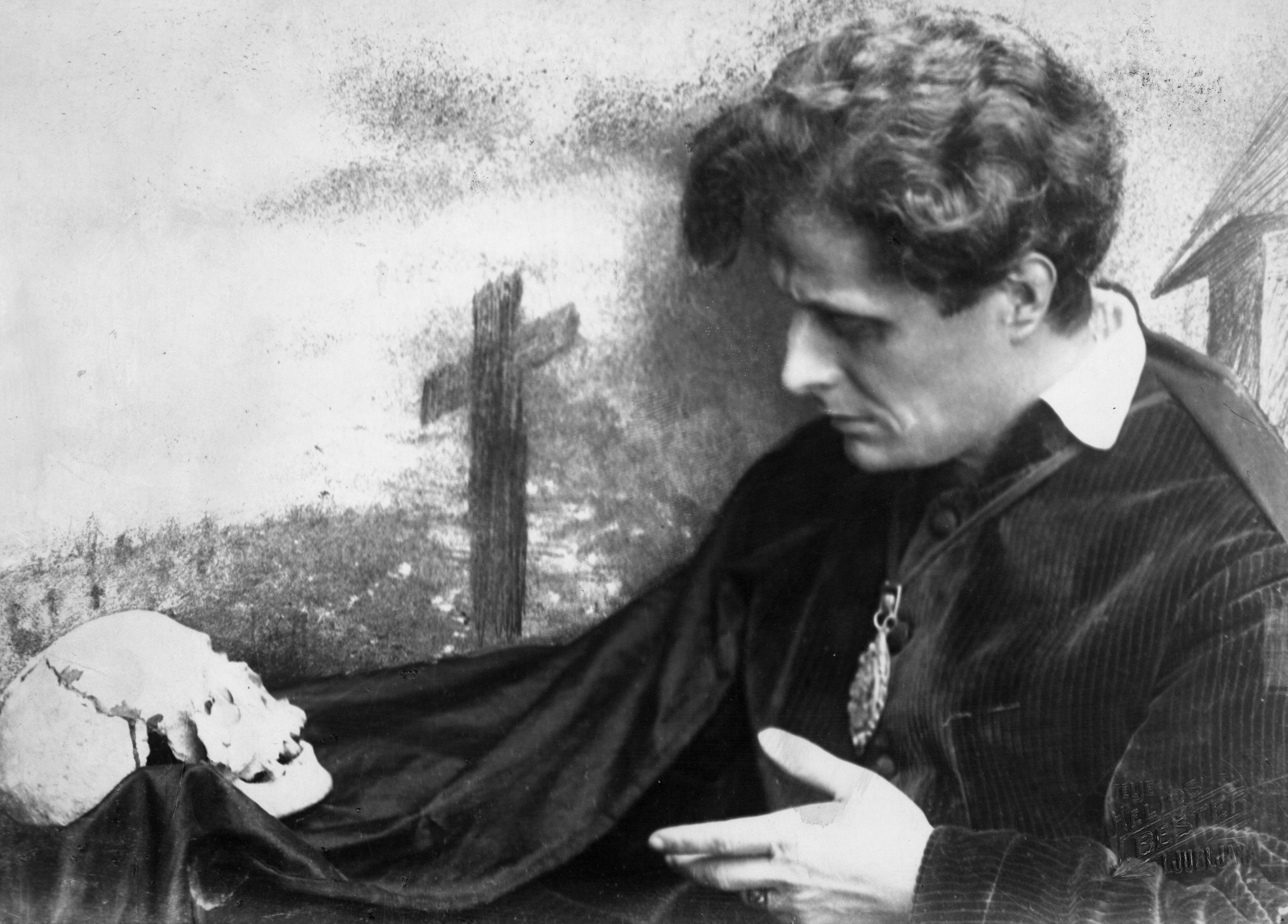
- Rogoz in 1929
- Born: 10 October 1887; Zagreb, Kingdom of Croatia-Slavonia, Austria-Hungary
- Died: 6 February 1988 (aged 100); Zagreb, SR Croatia, SFR Yugoslavia
- Occupation: Actor
- Years active: 1907–1988

Zvonimir Rogoz (10 October 1887 – 6 February 1988) was a Croatian actor. He played in German, Croatian, Slovene, Czech, and Slovak, on stage and in cinema, during a career lasting 81 years.

A native of Zagreb, Rogoz started his actor career in Vienna in the Wiener Theater. From 1919 to 1929, he was an actor and director in Ljubljana. Rogoz became famous in Czechoslovakia as a guest in title roles when Ljubljana theater in 1927 played in Prague Shakespeare's Hamlet and Dostoevsky's The Idiot. Rogoz remained in engagement in National Theatre in Prague from 1929 until 1949. In the prewar period, he appeared in many Czechoslovak films of the 1930s, including the 1933 erotic drama Ecstasy, featuring young Hedy Lamarr. He then returned to Zagreb, playing in theater, cinema, and television until his death. Younger generations of Croatia remember him even more for his private life: he fathered a child at the age of 92. This and other events became the subject of his autobiographical book Mojih prvih 100 godina (My First 100 Years). He died in Zagreb a few months after his 100th birthday.

== Filmography ==
- The Glembays (1988)
- Pet mrtvih adresa (1984)
- Kiklop (1982)
- Dobro jutro sine (1978)
- Okupacija u 26 slika (1978)
- Harmonika (1972)
- Putovanje na mjesto nesreće (1971)
- Starci (1971)
- Slučajni život (1969)
- Cintek (1967)
- Rondo (1966)
- Ključ (1965)
- Banket (1965)
- San (1965)
- Doktor Knok (1964)
- Vrapčić (1964)
- Carevo novo ruho (1961)
- Samsonov sin (1960)
- Vlak bez voznog reda (1959)
- Nije bilo uzalud (1957)
- Opsada (1956)
- The Beginning Was Sin (1954)
- U početku bijaše grijeh (1954)
- Koncert kao Pjaskovski (1954)
- Revolucijski rok 1848 (1949)
- Pripad Z-8 (1949)
- Muzikant (1948)
- Dok se vratiš (1948)
- Tri kamaradi (1947)
- Violina i san (1947)
- Krakatit (1947)
- Fourteen at the Table (1943)
- The Dancer (1943)
- Bila jahta u Splitu (1939)
- Ecstasy (1933)

== TV roles ==
- Dnevnik Očenašeka (1968)
