= Alexandra Myšková =

Czech-born Norwegian actress (born 1922)

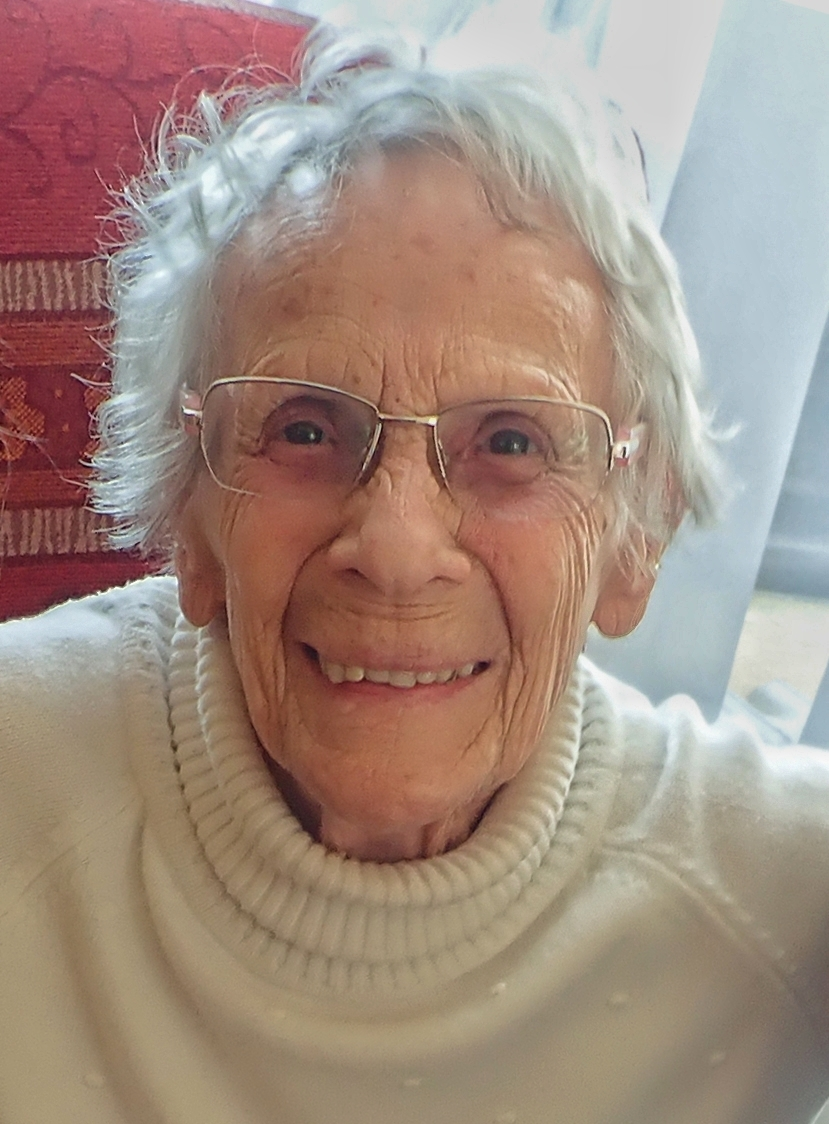
- Myšková in 2023
- Born: 4 April 1922 (age 103); Prague, Czechoslovakia
- Occupation(s): Actress, theatre teacher
- Years active: 1949–2000
- Awards: Norwegian Theatre Critics Award

Alexandra Myšková (born 4 April 1922) is a Czech-born Norwegian retired actress, director, and theatre teacher. She worked in Czechoslovakia before continuing her career in Norway.

== Life and career ==
In 1941, Myšková graduated from the Prague Conservatory. During World War II, she performed at Divadélko pro 99, working alongside Felix Le Breux, Dana Medřická, and others under the direction of Jindřich Honzl.

After the war, she briefly performed with the Studio of the National Theatre and later worked at the Realistic Theatre during the late 1940s and 1950s.

From 1950 to 1970, she was a member of the acting troupe of the Municipal Theatres of Prague. Starting in 1961, she also taught at the DAMU. Between 1948 and 1968, she appeared in twenty films.

In 1970, she moved to Norway. From 1970 to 1995, she taught at the Norwegian Theatre Academy in Oslo, and later at the Bårdar Music and Dance Academy. During this period, she also directed her own dramatizations of works by Anton Chekhov, Ivan Turgenev, and Karel Čapek for Norwegian radio.

== Personal life ==
Myšková was married three times. Her first husband was actor Vladimír Ráž, and her third was costume and stage designer Zdeněk Seydl. She directed more than twenty productions in Norwegian theatres.

In 1983, she received the Norwegian Theatre Critics Award for her production of The Moon in the Village. She was also awarded the King's Medal of Merit in gold for her significant contributions to Norwegian culture.

She turned 100 in 2022.

== Filmography ==
- Distant Journey (1949) – Theresienstadt prisoner with pouch
- Zkouška pokračuje (1959) – Eva Malátová, actress
- Romeo, Juliet and Darkness (1960) – Würm's wife
- Hledá se táta (1961) – Růženka, Liška's wife
- The Fifth Horseman Is Fear (1965) – Eccentric woman
