= Jan Pivec =

Czech actor

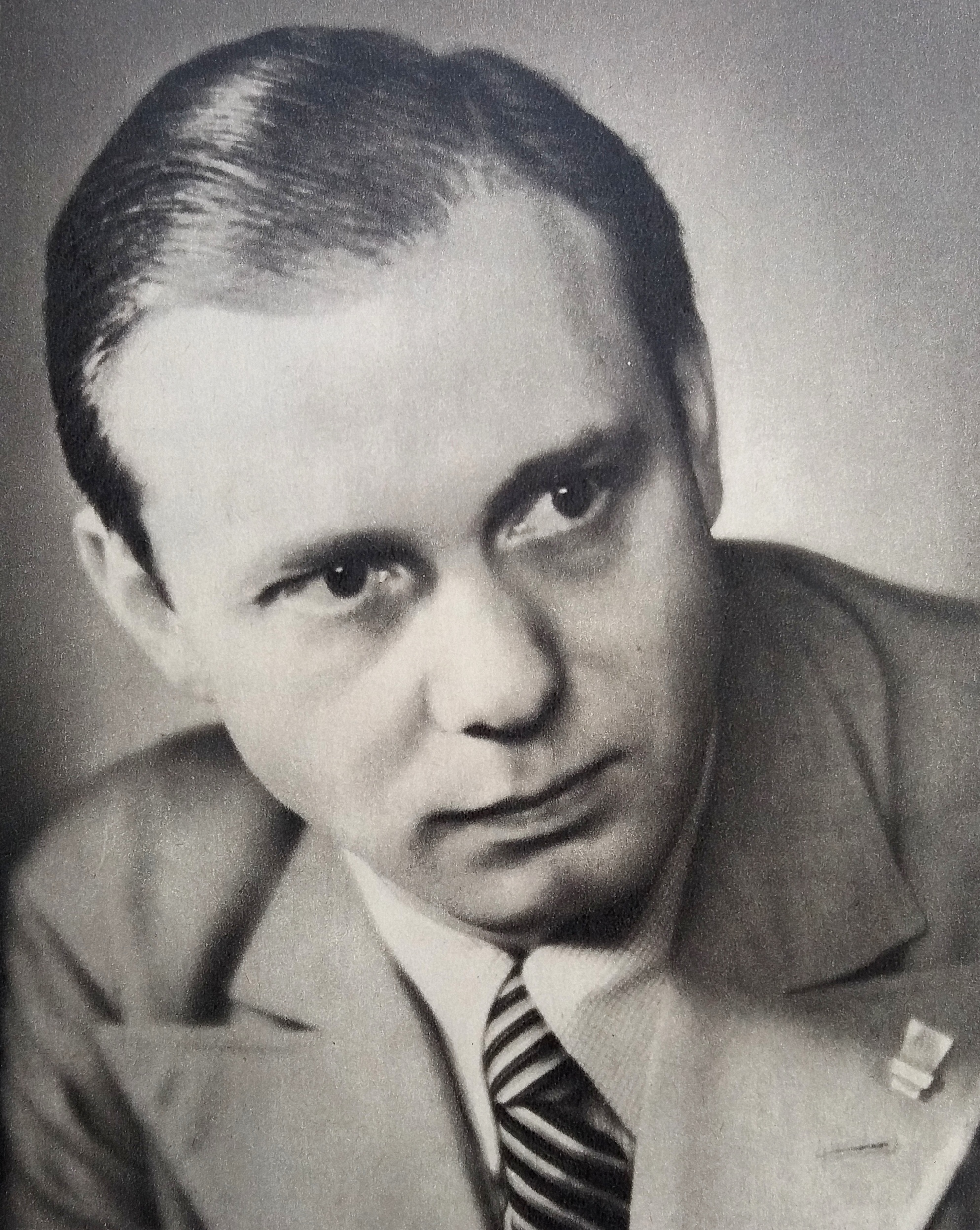
- Born: 19 May 1907; Prague, Bohemia, Austria-Hungary
- Died: 10 May 1980 (aged 72); Prague, Czechoslovakia
- Occupation: Actor
- Years active: 1940–1973

Jan Pivec (19 May 1907 – 10 May 1980) was a Czech film and stage actor. He appeared in more than 69 films between 1940 and 1973. He concurrently spent 36 years acting in productions staged by Prague's National Theatre. Books published in 1989, and in 2006, detailed his career.

== Selected filmography ==
- Delightful Story (1936)
- Filosofská historie (1937)
- Pantáta Bezoušek (1941)
- The Blue Star Hotel (1941)
- The Dancer (1943)
- Rozina, the Love Child (1945)
- Don't You Know of an Unoccupied Flat? (1947)
- Divá Bára (1949)
- Jan Hus (1954)
- Jan Žižka (1955)
- Against All (1956)
- Zločin a trik II. (1967)
