= Pohádka (disambiguation) =

Pohádka is a Czech term usually translated as fairy tale. It may refer to:

== Music ==
- Fairy Tale (Suk), a.k.a. Pohádka, a composition for orchestra by Josef Suk (1899-1900)
- Pohádka, a.k.a. Fairy Tale, a composition for cello and piano by Leoš Janáček (1910, with later revisions)

== Film ==
- Pohádka máje, a 1940 drama film directed by Otakar Vávra
- Pohádka o staré tramvaji, a.k.a. The Old Tram, a 1961 film
- The Tale of John and Mary, a.k.a. Pohádka o Honzíkovi a Mařence, a 1980 animated film
