= Poesie pouti =

1948 film

Poesie pouti is a 1948 Czechoslovak film. The film starred Josef Kemr. It entered 1948 Venice International Film Festival.
