= Tulák Macoun =

1939 film

Tulák Macoun is a 1939 Czechoslovak film. The film starred Josef Kemr.
