= Poznej svého muže =

1940 film

Poznej svého muže is a 1940 Czechoslovak film. The film starred Josef Kemr.
