= Pět hříšníků =

Pět hříšníků is a 1964 Czechoslovak film. The film starred Josef Kemr.

== Cast ==
- Rudolf Hrusínský as Pockmarked
- Josef Kemr as official Bláha
- Václav Lohniský as Smiling Tonda
- Jan Skopecek as Innkeeper
- Ilja Racek as Dlouhán
