= Rodinné trampoty oficiála Tříšky =

1949 film directed by Josef Mach

Rodinné trampoty oficiála Tříšky is a 1949 Czechoslovak film. The film starred Josef Kemr.
