= Schůzka o půl čtvrté =

1957 Czechoslovak film

Schůzka o půl čtvrté is a 1957 Czechoslovak film. The film starred Josef Kemr.
