= The Hen and the Sexton =

1951 film by Oldřich Lipský

The Hen and the Sexton (Czech: Slepice a kostelník) is a 1951 Czechoslovak comedy film directed by Oldřich Lipský and Jan Strejček.

== Plot ==
In the village of Lužánky in Moravian Slovakia live a "progressive" peasant, Toněk Pěknica, and his "backward" wife, Tereza. Tonek is in favor of establishing an agricultural cooperative (kolkhoz), while Tereza is against it. The village is also home to a rich and greedy Voznica, who hates the collective farm movement. He wants to prevent the creation and successful work of the cooperative.

The members of the cooperative are working hard to increase their harvest, installing a new irrigation system and preparing the fields for plowing. Voznick convinces the local naive and greedy clerk, Kodýtek, to help him sabotage the farmers' efforts.

He begins to distribute leaflets, involving Tonek's son Vincek. At the end of the film, everything is revealed, Kodýtek is convinced of the benefits of cooperatives, and even Tereza recognizes this. The village cheerfully celebrates the harvest festival.

== Cast ==
- Vlasta Burian as Josef Kodýtek, the sexton
- Otomar Korbelář as Tonek Pěknica
- Jiřina Štěpničková as Tereza, wife of Tonek Pěknica
- Vladimír Řepa as Voznica
- Eduard Muroň as Vincek, son of Pěknica
- Stanislava Seimlová as Karolina, daughter of Pěknica
- Josef Bek as national security officer
- Lubomír Lipský as Šárl, Voznica's son
- Josef Kemr as Smíšek
- Josef Toman as Mr. Řeřábek
- Bohumil Švarc as Jaroš Řeřábek
- Eman Fiala as Spáčil
- Bohumil Machník as parson
- Josef Hlinomaz as Šárl's friend
