= Paragraf 224 =

Paragraf 224 is a 1979 Czechoslovak film. The film starred Josef Kemr.
