= Bílá jachta ve Splitu =

1939 film by Ladislav Brom

Bílá jachta ve Splitu is a 1939 Czechoslovak film directed and written by Ladislav Brom, based on a story by Milan Begović. The film starred Josef Kemr.
