= Velká cesta =

- Directed by: Yuri Ozerov
- Starring: Josef Abrahám, Rudlof Hrušínský
- Cinematography: Igor Chernykh
- Music by: Karen Khachaturian
- Production companies: Mosfilm; Barrandov
- Release date: 1963
- Countries: Soviet Union; Czechoslovakia
- Languages: Russian; Czech

Velká cesta is a 1963 Czechoslovak and Soviet war comedy-drama film. The film starred Josef Kemr.

The film tells the satirical narrative of war, revolution, and resilience, following the young journalist Jaroslav Hašek as he transforms from a rebellious writer to a Red Army commander, penning the iconic adventures of Good Soldier Švejk amidst betrayal, camaraderie, and the cyclical ironies of history.

== Plot ==
The film begins with an animated sequence featuring the cheerful figure of the Good Soldier Švejk, whistling a jaunty tune as he strides across a spinning globe. The story centers on the young journalist Jaroslav Hašek, who often clashes with Prague police due to his irreverent and politically subversive behavior. After the outbreak of World War I, Hašek is conscripted into the army and deployed to the Eastern Front. Determined to surrender to the Russians, he finally achieves this through a bold encounter with Russian officer Polivanov, ending up in a POW camp. There, he befriends Josef Strašlipka, a simple and good-natured soldier.

As the Russian Revolution unfolds in 1917, Hašek and Strašlipka escape from the camp to join the Red Army. Hašek’s wit and intellect earn him a position as the commander of a small town, assisted by Shura, a passionate revolutionary who becomes his confidante and later his partner. While administrating the town, Hašek begins writing his satirical novel about the adventures of a hapless soldier, drawing inspiration from Strašlipka. Tensions arise when Polivanov, now an anti-Soviet figure, resurfaces. Despite Hašek’s goodwill, Polivanov betrays him, leading to an execution order for Hašek and Strašlipka. However, sympathetic soldiers stage a mock execution, enabling their escape. Hašek eventually captures Polivanov and reconciles with Shura during a climactic confrontation with White Army forces.

After the civil war, Hašek returns to newly independent Czechoslovakia with Shura and Strašlipka. In Prague, Hašek finds familiar faces comfortably ensconced in pre-war positions, highlighting the cyclical nature of authority and hypocrisy. The film’s tone shifts in its reflective conclusion, as Hašek—disillusioned and physically drained—parts ways with Strašlipka on Prague’s Charles Bridge, promising a brighter future for his friend. The story closes with the same animated sequence of Švejk, eternally marching through time and space, whistling his indomitable tune.

== Cast ==
- Josef Abrhám
- Rudolf Hrušínský
- Karel Effa
