= Klapzubova jedenáctka =

- Directed by: Ladislav Brom
- Starring: Theodor Pištěk; Josef Kemr
- Release date: 1938
- Running time: 93 minutes
- Country: Czechoslovakia
- Language: Czech

Klapzubova jedenáctka is a 1938 Czechoslovak film. The film starred Josef Kemr.
