= AEIOU (film) =

1979 Czechoslovak drama-comedy film

- Title card
- Directed by: Dušan Kukal; Martin Bezouška
- Written by: Dušan Kukal; Martin Bezouška
- Starring: Josef Kemr
- Edited by: Marie Moravcová
- Music by: Jan Hrubý; Jiří Veselý; Vladimír Mišík
- Distributed by: FAMU
- Release date: 5 September 1979
- Running time: 56 minutes
- Country: Czechoslovak
- Language: Czech

AEIOU is a 1979 Czechoslovak film. The film starred Josef Kemr, with other cast members, such as Jan Kačer, and Pavel Bosek. The film was a drama film, and while it is obscure to North and South America, it is screened at the Uherské Hradiště film school, for academic purposes.

It was released officially on 5 September 1991. The film was dedicated to deceased actor Ivan Lutanský, who played Karel Sedláček. AEIOU was also received negatively by the Eugene Among Us crew.

== Plot ==
Student Karel Sedláček declines the offer to enter the ranks of the communist police after graduation from his secondary school, despite him being the only boy in his class. Karel, upon graduating, discovers that his girlfriend is pregnant. This leads him to run away from his parents' house, where they planned for him to make wedding arrangements. While on the run, he finds Prague and presides there for asylum. However, he does not have a place to stay, and has to sleep without shelter. He sleeps in a cemetery, riddled with an addiction to alcohol, where a gravedigger discovers him, and calls the police. Luckily for Karel, the policeman releases him on parole, but he urges Karel to obtain a job, and shelter. Karel then encounters many interesting characters, and eventually decides on becoming a poet, but is unable to find shelter. While meeting different people, he finds his ex-girlfriend, who he discovers had an abortion. As a result of these events, he becomes a communist policeman in a small border village in the northern half of the country.

== Cast ==
- Ivan Lutanský as Karel Sedláček
- Eva Jakoubková as Dagmar
- Katarína Benčičová as Slovenka
- VladimÍr Šmeral as Hrobník
- Josef Kemr as Příslušník StB
- Jiří D. Novotný as Televizní Reportér
- Zdeněk Krištof as Kuchtík
- Dušan Kukal as Němec
- Martin Bezouška as Němec
- Ivan Vyskočil as Dad

== Production and release ==
AEIOU was directed by Dusan Kukal and Martin Bezouska. The soundtrack is composed by Jan Hruby, Jiri Vesely and Vladimir Misik, the founding members of the band Etc.

=== Background ===
The film's setting and general theme originate from the Czech screenplay Cemetery Flowers, itself being based on "Graveyard Flowers", a dark and gloomy poem characterising disappointment in life, and written by renowned Czech poet Jan Neruda.

The background is shared with the similar film Eugene Among Us, with the film mirroring many characteristics from the poem, and sharing filming locations, and studios. The two films are also intertwined, with the both of them sharing anti-socialist themes. Eugene Among Us follows a similar plot to AEIOU as well, with the protagonist traveling a great distance to Prague, in order to pursue a career, albeit as a road sweeper. Coincidentally, the protagonist also writes poetry, as a side hustle.

=== Filming ===
The filming process has been regarded as incredibly difficult and confusing by Kukal and Bezouska, as production was shelved numerous times, before finally being initiated in 1970, and finishing in 1979. The public does not have any snippets of the film in development; however, Bezouska has noted that filming was a lengthy process, and was more expensive than originally thought. Production was almost scrapped before it even started, as Bezouska stated "We had no plans to direct".

Many directors and cinematographers were considered to aid and develop the film, but these considerations were later rescinded. The film was restricted from release by the Communist Party of Czechoslovakia for the entire production, only being revealed to the public in 1989, and released in 1991, while the principal ideas and creative process took place at Studio FAMU. The film was shot in Czechoslovakia, locally in Prague. The two directors — Dusan Kukal and Martin Bezouska — were originally screenwriters. Marie Moravcová edited the film.

The original working title, O básníky nikdo nestojí (English: No One Cares About Poets) was originally shortened to Poets (Czech: Básníci). However, a similarly titled film, How the World Loses Poets, was actively being filmed, and was based on a popular TV show. Therefore, the film was renamed to AEIOU, the name deriving from pictures of a spelling book, and the desire of Bezouska and Kukal to have a neutral title.

The movie was shot using 16mm film, an unusual deviation from the then-standard 35mm film of the late 20th century. It was also shot in black-and-white, mono audio, and was entirely in Czech. AEIOU is also notable for being one of few films to use the music genre Špejchar blues, with both Kukal and Bezouska praising the fit the music had in the film.

==== Scrapped ending ====
It has been referenced by Bezouska that it took him and Kukal a long time to film the ending, which was supposed to be bitter, but slightly reminiscent of a sweet fairy tale. This ending planned to feature Bohuš Záhorský, who was regarded highly by the duo. However, Záhorský was incredibly sick at the time of filming, and died in 1980. This scrapped ending featured Karel Sedláček at first getting ready, and preparing for his police career in the Ore Mountains, and Moldava, and later cutting to him walking with an acquaintance on aged, inactive train tracks. He arrives at a pub, where only the staff appear to be drinking at that hour. Karel gets offered a glass, and Záhorský, who was planned to play the cook, says "See, Karel, everything turned out just fine." This line did remain in the film, although it is not said by Záhorský.

AEIOU was released officially on 5 September 1991.

== Reception ==
=== From the Eugene Among Us crew ===
The film was received negatively by Martin Vadas, one of the principal directors of Eugene Among Us, which, ironically, went through a parallel release process. Vadas was a devout skeptic of the film, and the approach that Bezouska and Kukal took in directing. He also failed to see how the story of the film could be realistic, criticising the confusing character development, and the plot of a poet becoming a communist policeman.

AEIOU did not strike Jan Kraus as significant at the time, as he felt that Eugene Among Us had better equipment, and a more realistic story. He also felt that AEIOU would finish at a slower pace, and that Eugene Among Us would be first to screenings, as they were both being produced and filmed at the same time.

=== Tributes ===
Evald Schorm heavily influenced the filming process of AEIOU, maintaining close and intimate ties with both Kukal and Bezouska through their lives. In fact, Jan Kacer only became aware of the filming and production of AEIOU because Evald gave him the script to proofread. Schorm would die in 1988, of unknown causes, however, he was one of the most important artists to the Czechoslovak New Wave, and received many posthumous honours.

The Barrandov Film Studio is incorrectly regarded as the sole studio credited for the release and distribution of AEIOU, with this tribute taking place at the end of the film. The tribute reads: "After the November 1989 revolution, thanks to the Barrandov film studio, the film finally reached the audiences for whom they had been intended during the era of oppression and "Normalization."
