= The Man from the First Century =

1962 film

Man in Outer Space
- Directed by: Oldřich Lipský
- Written by: Oldřich Lipský; Zdeněk Bláha; Miloš Fiola; Jan Fišer
- Story by: Miloš Fiala; Jan Fišer; Oldřich Lipský
- Starring: Miloš Kopecký
- Cinematography: Vladimír Novotný
- Edited by: Jan Kohout
- Music by: Ladislav Simon; Zdeněk Liška
- Production company: Filmové studio Barrandov
- Distributed by: Ústřední půjčovna filmů
- Release date: 23 March 1962
- Running time: 91 min.
- Country: Czechoslovakia
- Language: Czech

Man in Outer Space AKA The Man from the First Century (Czech: Muž z prvního století) is a 1962 Czechoslovak science fiction comedy film directed by Oldřich Lipský. It was entered into the 1962 Cannes Film Festival.

== Plot ==
Set in the second half of the 20th century, plans are in place to launch the first Czech spacecraft. Upholsterer Josef (played by Miloš Kopecký ) makes the final adjustments to the vehicle and accidentally starts the ship. He flies to the planet Blue Star. There, he meets planet inhabitant Adam (Radovan Lukavský), and they both return to Earth. Somehow, 600 years have passed. Josef ends up in a psychiatric hospital, but escapes, and with the help of the Adam, who is apparently invisible on Earth, he returns to his own timeline.

== Cast ==
- Miloš Kopecký as Josef, an upholsterer
- Radovan Lukavský as Adam
- Otomar Krejča as Academic
- Vít Olmer as Engineer Petr
- Anita Kajlichova as Psychiatrist Eva
- Lubomír Lipský as Order fulfillment clerk
- Vladimír Hlavatý as Director of the Rocket factory
- Josef Hlinomaz as Foreman
