= At the Terminus =

1957 film

At the Terminus (Czech: Tam na konečné) is a 1957 Czechoslovak film. The film starred Josef Kemr.
