= How to Drown Dr. Mracek, the Lawyer =

1974 Czechoslovak comedy film

- DVD cover
- Directed by: Václav Vorlíček
- Written by: Miloš Macourek; Petr Markov; Václav Vorlíček
- Starring: Jaromír Hanzlík; Libuše Šafránková; František Filipovský
- Cinematography: Vladimír Novotný
- Edited by: Miroslav Hájek
- Music by: Vítězslav Hádl
- Distributed by: Ústřední půjčovna filmů, Národní filmový archiv
- Release date: 1974
- Running time: 96 minutes
- Country: Czechoslovakia
- Language: Czech

How to Drown Dr. Mracek, the Lawyer (Czech: Jak utopit dr. Mráčka aneb Konec vodníků v Čechách) is a Czechoslovak comedy film directed by Václav Vorlíček. It was released in 1974.

== Plot ==
The plot follows a family of water spirits (vodníci) who live in a river and enter through a house next to the river. As part of a regular inspection, the house is found to have mold and water damage, and they must find a way to drown the lawyer foreseeing the case of the house. Otherwise they will have nowhere to live and be discovered.

== Cast ==
- Jaromír Hanzlík - Dr. Jindřich Mráček
- Libuše Šafránková - Jana Vodičková
- František Filipovský - Bertík
- Miloš Kopecký - Mr. Wassermann
- Vladimír Menšík - Karel
- Zdeněk Řehoř - Alois
- Stella Zázvorková - Doc. Mráčková
- Eva Trejtnarová - Polly Wassermann
- Čestmír Řanda - Albert Bach
- Míla Myslíková - Matilda Wassermann
- Vlastimil Hašek - Honza
- Jiří Hrzán - Tomáš
- Miroslav Masopust - Rolf
- Gabriela Wilhelmová - Růženka
- Milena Steinmasslová - Krista
