= Za humny je drak =

1982 film by Radim Cvrček

Za humny je drak is a 1982 Czechoslovak film. The film starred Josef Kemr.

== Plot ==
The film is about a dragon called Mrak. King Jan is scared of him even though Mrak is not evil and even befriends a girl Lidka.
