= Poučení =

1957 film

Poučení is a 1957 Czechoslovak film. The film starred Josef Kemr.
