= Those Wonderful Movie Cranks =

- Directed by: Jiří Menzel
- Written by: Jirí Menzel; Oldřich Vlček
- Produced by: Jan Suster
- Starring: Rudolf Hrušínský
- Cinematography: Jaromír Šofr
- Edited by: Jiří Brožek
- Music by: Jiří Šust
- Distributed by: Ústřední půjčovna filmů
- Release date: 10 September 1979
- Running time: 90 minutes
- Country: Czechoslovakia
- Language: Czech

Those Wonderful Movie Cranks (Czech: Báječní muži s klikou) is a 1978 Czech comedy film directed by Jiří Menzel. The film was selected as the Czech entry for the Best Foreign Language Film at the 52nd Academy Awards, but was not accepted as a nominee.

The film has also been referred to by the title Magicians of the Silver Screen.

== Cast ==
- Rudolf Hrušínský - Pasparte
- Vladimír Menšík - Slapeta
- Jiří Menzel - Kolenatý
- Vlasta Fabianová - Emílie Kolárová-Mladá
- Blažena Holišová - Evzenie
- Jaromíra Mílová - Pepicka
- Josef Kemr - Benjamín
- Oldřich Vlček - Berousek
- Josef Somr - Ourada
- Vladimír Huber - Hynek
- Marie Rosulková - Madame
- Hana Buresová - Aloisie

== See also ==
- List of submissions to the 52nd Academy Awards for Best Foreign Language Film
- List of Czechoslovak submissions for the Academy Award for Best Foreign Language Film
