= Awakening (1959 film) =

1959 film

Awakening (Czech: Probuzení) is a 1959 Czechoslovak film. The film starred Josef Kemr.
