= Old Ironside (film) =

1948 film

- Directed by: Václav Kubásek
- Written by: Jaroslav Mach; Karel Steklý; Jaroslav Zrotal
- Produced by: Rudolf Fencl
- Starring: Jaroslav Marvan; Marie Ježková; Otomar Krejča
- Cinematography: Josef Střecha
- Edited by: Josef Dobřichovský
- Music by: Miloš Smatek
- Production company: Československý státní film
- Distributed by: Československý státní film
- Release date: 3 December 1948
- Running time: 83 minutes
- Country: Czechoslovakia
- Language: Czech

Old Ironside (Czech: Železný dědek) is a 1948 Czech comedy drama film directed by Václav Kubásek and starring Jaroslav Marvan, Marie Ježková and Otomar Krejča. It was shot at the Barrandov Studios in Prague and on location at various stations on the railway between Prague and Beroun. The film's sets were designed by the art director Alois Mecera. It was released in several Eastern Bloc countries by distributor Sovexport.

== Synopsis ==
During the final weeks of the Second World War, experienced engine driver tries to protect his beloved locomotive from an attack by dive bombers, but is injured and the engine is damaged. Facing retirement but alarmed that his old engine is to be scrapped, he leads some apprentices to help restore her. He then helps to avert a dangerous accident on the railway and is invited back to work.

== Cast ==
- Jaroslav Marvan as Antonín Matys - engine-driver
- Marie Ježková as Božena Matysová
- Otomar Krejča as Vojta Jandera - machinist
- Marie Kautská as Marie Janderová
- Vítězslav Boček as Ing. Podroužek - stationmaster
- Vladimír Hlavatý as Worker Žejdlic
- J. O. Martin as Frantisek Zálabský - Workshop foreman
- Lubomír Lipský as Vašek Kajdoš - fireman
- Emil Bolek as Engine-driver Kotrba
- Stanislav Neumann as Attendant Hanousek
- Ladislav Kulhánek as Revisory doctor
- Karel Effa as Seller
- Vilém Prokop Mlejnek as Musician
- Pavel Spálený as Stock keeper #1
- Bolek Prchal as Stock keeper #2
- František Marek as Foreman #1
- Jaroslav Orlický as Foreman #2
- Josef Steigl as Foreman #3
- Ladislav Sedláček as Stationmaster
- Antonín Šůra as Apprentice Bořík
- Vladimir Dvorský as Apprentice #1
- Jarka Pižla as Apprentice #2
- Josef Hlinomaz as Worker #1
- Emil Dlesk as Worker #2
- Jindra Hermanová as Saleswoman #1
- Inka Horáková as Saleswoman #2

== Bibliography ==
- Wohl, Eugen & Păcurar, Elena. Language of the Revolution: The Discourse of Anti-Communist Movements in the "Eastern Bloc" Countries: Case Studies. Springer Nature, 2023. p. 348.
