= Tvář pod maskou =

Tvář pod maskou is a 1970 Czechoslovak film. The film starred Josef Kemr.
