= Zpověď Dona Juana =

Zpověď Dona Juana is a 1991 Czechoslovak film. The film starred Josef Kemr.
