= Jarka a Věra =

1938 film by Václav Binovec

Jarka a Věra is a 1938 Czechoslovak film. The film starred Josef Kemr.
