= Kam slunce nechodí =

- Directed by: Ivo Novák
- Starring: Ilja Prachar; Marie Drahokoupilová; Vladimír Mensík
- Edited by: Miroslav Hájek
- Release date: 1971
- Running time: 63 minutes
- Country: Czechoslovakia
- Language: Czech

Kam slunce nechodí is a 1971 Czechoslovak comedy film. The film stars Josef Kemr.

== Cast ==
- Ilja Prachar as Vik
- Marie Drahokoupilová as Elen Viková
- Vladimír Mensík as Ondrej Andrýsek
- Iva Janzurová as Julie Andrýsková
- Waldemar Matuska as Smola
