= Portáši =

1947 film

Portáši is a 1947 Czechoslovak film. The film starred Josef Kemr.
