= Vina Vladimíra Olmera =

1956 film by Václav Gajer

Vina Vladimíra Olmera is a 1956 Czechoslovak film. The film starred Josef Kemr.
