= Valčík pro milión =

1960 film directed by Josef Mach

Valčík pro milión is a 1960 Czechoslovak film. The film starred Josef Kemr.
