= Frona =

1954 film directed by Jiří Krejčík

Frona is a 1954 Czechoslovak film. The film starred Josef Kemr.
