= Bouřka =

Bouřka is a 1968 Czechoslovak film. The film starred Josef Kemr.
