= Prosím, pane profesore =

1940 film

Prosím, pane profesore is a 1940 Czechoslovak film. The film starred Josef Kemr.
