= Hvězda jede na jih =

- Directed by: Oldrich Lipský
- Written by: Oldrich Lipský; Vladimír Skutina
- Starring: Gordana Miletić
- Cinematography: Ferdinand Pecenka
- Edited by: Miroslav Hájek
- Music by: Jiří Baur; Miloslav Ducháč; Vlastimil Hála
- Production company: Lovcen Film
- Distributed by: Ústřední půjčovna filmů
- Release dates: 1958 (filmed); 15 May 1964 (released)
- Running time: 98 minutes
- Countries: Yugoslavia; Czechoslovakia
- Languages: Czech; Serbo-Croatian

Hvězda jede na jih is a 1958 Czechoslovak-Yugoslavian comedy film directed by Oldrich Lipský.

== Cast ==
- Gordana Miletić - Sona Klánová - singer
- Rudolf Hrušínský - Conductor
- Joza Gregorin - Driver Dargo
- Barbara Połomska - Lída
- Ludmila Píchová - Camper Nademlejnská
- Rudolf Deyl - Alfréd Necásek
- Stella Zázvorková - Camper Petioká
- Miloš Kopecký - Soustek - tourist guide
- Eman Fiala - Camper Strouhal
- Jaroslav Stercl - Drummer Pistelák
- Rudolf Cortés - Rudy Bárta - singer
- Karel Effa - Egon Zejda - guitarist
- Vladimír Menšík - Clarinetist Vostrák
- Lubomír Lipský - Trombonist Holpuch
- Josef Hlinomaz - Trumpetist Bríza
