= Za trnkovým keřem =

Za trnkovým keřem is a 1980 Czechoslovak film. The film starred Josef Kemr.
