= Zlé pondělí =

- Directed by: Milan Vosmik
- Release date: 1960
- Running time: 77 minute
- Country: Czechoslovakia
- Language: Czech

Zlé pondělí is a 1960 Czechoslovak film. The film starred Josef Kemr.
