= To byl český muzikant =

1940 film

To byl český muzikant is a 1940 Czechoslovak film. The film starred Josef Kemr.
