= In the Coat of Lioness' Arms =

1994 Czech film

In the Coat of Lioness' Arms (Czech: V erbu lvice) aka Zdislava of Lemberk, is a 1994 Czech film. The film starred Josef Kemr. It received a Czech Lion nomination for Best Design Achievement.
