= Dva ohně =

1949 film

Dva ohně is a 1949 Czechoslovak film. The film starred Josef Kemr.
