= Plaché příběhy =

Plaché příběhy is a 1982 Czechoslovak film. The film starred Josef Kemr.
