= Hry a sny =

- Directed by: Milan Vosmik
- Written by: Ludvík Askenazy
- Cinematography: Josef Strecha
- Edited by: Miroslav Hájek
- Release date: 1958
- Running time: 89 minute
- Country: Czechoslovakia
- Language: Czech

Hry a sny is a 1958 Czechoslovak film starring Josef Kemr.

== Cast ==
- Misa Staninec as chlapecek Petr Vrba
- Miluska Baliová as HolcickaLubomír Bryg as Muz s kyticí
- Terezie Brzková as Babicka
- Marie Buddeusová as Masopustováb
- Frantisek Cerný as Pasazér taxi
- Eman Fiala as Lampár
