= Žižkův meč =

Žižkův meč is a 1970 Czechoslovak film. The film starred Josef Kemr.

== Cast ==
- Josef Beyvl
- Stefan Bulejko
- Stanislav Fiser
- Gustav Heverle
- Vítezslav Jandák
- Rudolf Jelínek
