= Konec jasnovidce =

1957 film

Konec jasnovidce is a 1957 Czechoslovak film. The film starred Josef Kemr.
