= Příběh dušičkový =

Příběh dušičkový is a 1964 Czechoslovak film. The film starred Josef Kemr.
