= Justice for Selwyn =

- Directed by: Jiří Weiss
- Written by: Zdeněk Bláha
- Based on: Spravedlnost pro Selvina by Karel Čapek
- Starring: Rudolf Hrušínský; Klaus Schwarzkopf; Jiřina Šejbalová
- Cinematography: Jan Čuřík
- Music by: Zdeněk Liška
- Production company: Česká televize
- Release date: 1968
- Countries: Czechoslovakia; West Germany
- Language: Czech

Justice for Selwyn (Czech: Spravedlnost pro Selvina) is a 1968 Czech-West German television film directed by Jiří Weiss and starring Rudolf Hrušínský.

== Cast ==
- Rudolf Hrušínský as Unden
- Klaus Schwarzkopf as Selvin
- Jiřina Šejbalová as Selvin's mother
- Míla Myslíková as Irena
- Josef Kemr as Notary
- Věra Tichánková as Witness
