= Bláhový sen =

1943 film

Bláhový sen is a 1943 Czech musical drama. Directed by J.A. Holman.The film starred Josef Kemr.
