= Druhé mládí =

1938 film

Druhé mládí is a 1938 Czechoslovak film. The film starred Josef Kemr.
