= Drahý zesnulý =

Drahý zesnulý is a 1964 Czechoslovak film. The film starred Josef Kemr.
