= Štika v rybníce =

1951 film

Štika v rybníce is a 1951 Czechoslovak film starring Josef Kemr.
