= Střevíčky slečny Pavlíny =

1941 film

Střevíčky slečny Pavlíny is a 1941 Czechoslovak film. The film starred Josef Kemr.
