= Chléb a písně =

- Directed by: Jaroslav Novotný
- Starring: Josef Kemr
- Release date: 1971
- Running time: 155 minute
- Country: Czechoslovakia

Chléb a písně is a 1971 Czechoslovak film. The film starred Josef Kemr.
