= Vinobraní =

Vinobraní is a 1982 Czechoslovak film starring Josef Kemr.
