= Jak se zbavit Helenky =

Jak se zbavit Helenky is a 1967 Czechoslovak film. The film starred Josef Kemr.
