= Mezi námi zloději =

Mezi námi zloději is a 1963 Czechoslovak film. The film starred Josef Kemr., Otomar Krejča, Vladimír Menšík, Jiří Sovák, Jaroslav Vojta, Stella Zázvorková, František Filipovský, Eman Fiala, and Věra Ferbasová. Director: Vladimír Čech.
