= Lízino štěstí =

1939 film

Lízino štěstí is a 1939 Czechoslovak film starring Josef Kemr.
