= Na pytlácké stezce =

Czechoslovak film

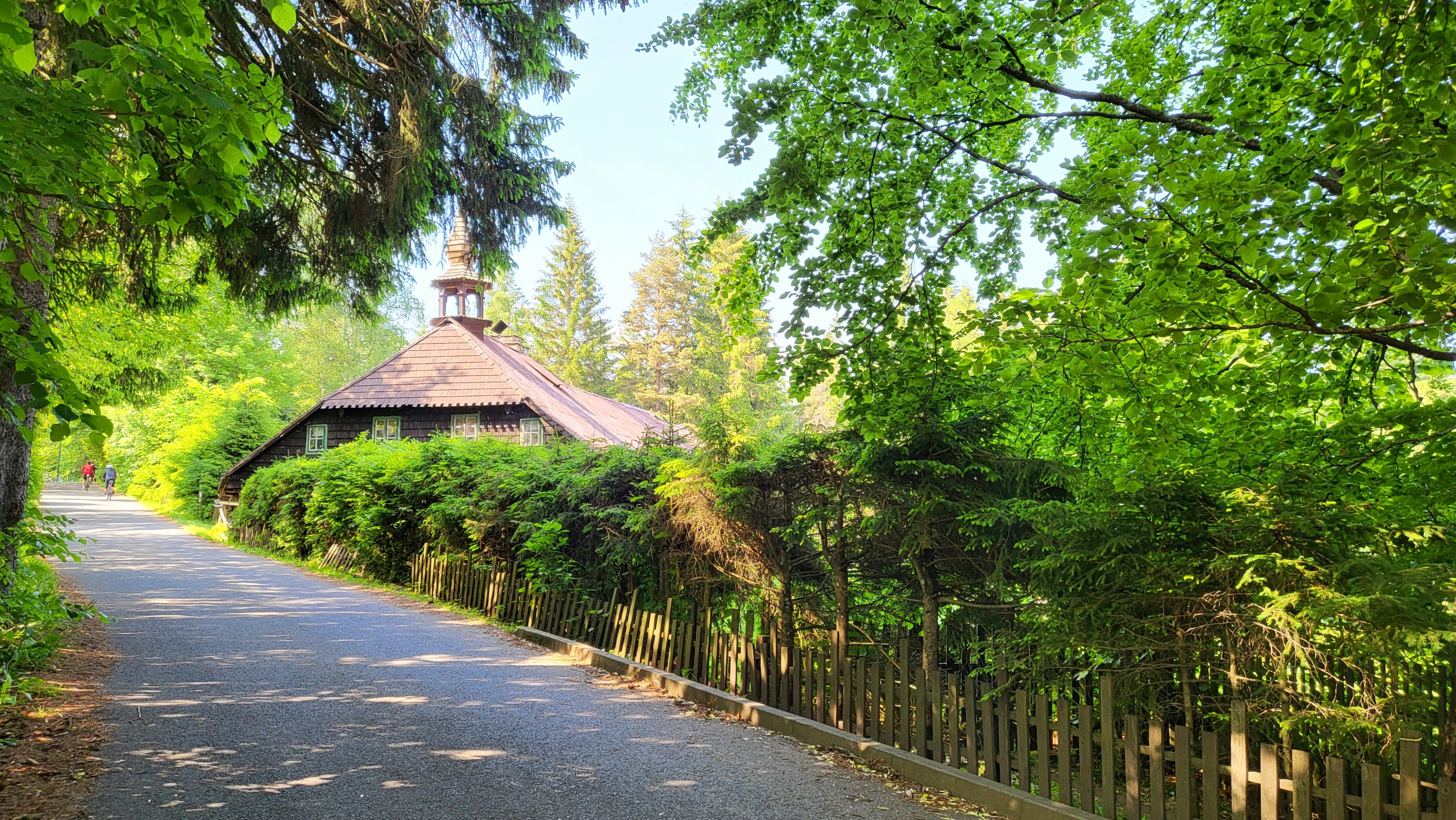
Klostermann's cottage near Srní - the cottage from the trilogy with Tomáš Holý – Pod jezevčí skálou, Na pytlácké stezce a Za trnkovým keřem – his grandfather lived in the cottage

Na pytlácké stezce (lit. On the trail of poachers) is a 1979 Czechoslovak film directed by Václav Gajer. The film starred Josef Kemr. It is the second film, after Pod Jezevčí skálou, in a trilogy about a child learning to know the world of nature and animals, that ends with Za trnkovým keřem.

== Production ==
The music, as that of the other two films, was composed by Miloň Čepelka.
