= Focus, Please! =

1956 film

- Directed by: Martin Frič
- Written by: Jiří Marek; Martin Frič
- Starring: Jan Pivec
- Edited by: Jan Kohout
- Music by: Ludvík Podéšť
- Release date: 25 December 1956
- Running time: 80 minutes
- Country: Czechoslovakia
- Language: Czech

Focus, Please! (Czech: Zaostřit, prosím!) is a Czech comedy film directed by Martin Frič. It was released in 1956.

== Cast ==
- Jan Pivec as Posahal
- Josef Kemr as Prehrsle
- Zdeňka Baldová as Tchyne
- Gustav Heverle as Reditel
- Vlasta Burian as Dusek - ucetní
- Vlastimil Brodský as Macek
- František Vnouček as Sefredaktor
- František Filipovský as Tajemník
- Miloš Nedbal as Reditel
- Lubomír Lipský as Vrchní ucetní
- Ladislav Pešek as Komentátor
- Zdeněk Řehoř as Mladý autor
- Frantisek Hanus as Autor filmu
- Bozena Obrová as Klapka
