= Tri razy svitá ráno =

1962 film by Jozef Medveď

Tri razy svitá ráno is a 1962 Czechoslovak film. The film starred Josef Kemr and was directed by Jozef Medveď.
