= Slečna od vody =

- Directed by: Bořivoj Zeman
- Written by: Bořivoj Zeman, Jiří Karásek
- Cinematography: Jan Stallich
- Music by: Dalibor C. Vačkář
- Release date: 1959
- Running time: 76 minutes
- Country: Czechoslovakia
- Language: Czech

Slečna od vody is a 1959 Czechoslovak film directed by Bořivoj Zeman and written by him and Jiří Karásek. The cinematography is by Jan Stallich and music is by Dalibor C. Vačkář. The film starred Josef Kemr.

== Plot summary ==
Helena Pokorná and her father are both employees in the same factory. Her father will be spending the summer holidays at home in Prague and is already looking forward to returning to work. Helena has a seaside vacation planned as a reward for her hard work. But one sweltering July day, the sight of the cool river leads her to call in sick at work. She takes a ferry to Modřany, a suburb of Prague, where she meets a young man who pulls her into the world of strange fun, notorious drifters, and women of the water. One of the young hooligans there steals her dress and while the young man helps her get it back, he now won’t leave her alone. Meanwhile, her father brings her lunch to work, only to find out that she’s called in sick. He takes her place in the factory and looks forward to giving her a stern talking to that night. Later in the day, Helena is walking through the streets of Prague with her new acquaintance and is afraid to go home. She runs away from the young man, but he makes it to her apartment before Helena and speaks to her father. Helena is so embarrassed by her cavorting that day, she tears up her vacation coupon from work.
