= Přicházejí z tmy =

1953 film

- Directed by: Václav Gajer
- Written by: Miloslav Fábera
- Release date: 1953
- Running time: 60 minute
- Country: Czechoslovakia
- Language: Czech

Přicházejí z tmy is a 1953 Czechoslovak film. The film starred Josef Kemr.

== Cast ==
- Adolf Král asKarel Martinec
- Josef Mixa as Jaroslav Martinec
- Jarmila Kurandová as Aneska Martincova
- Josef Kemr as Tomek
