= Malostranské humoresky =

Malostranské humoresky is a 1995 Czech film that starred Josef Kemr.
