= The Ninth Heart =

1979 Czechoslovak fantasy film

- Theatrical release poster
- Directed by: Juraj Herz
- Written by: Josef Hanzlík; Juraj Herz
- Starring: Ondřej Pavelka; Anna Maľová
- Cinematography: Jiří Macháně
- Edited by: Jaromír Janáček
- Music by: Petr Hapka
- Production company: Filmové studio Barrandov
- Distributed by: Ústřední půjčovna filmů
- Release date: 13 April 1979
- Running time: 88 minutes
- Country: Czechoslovakia
- Language: Czech

The Ninth Heart (Czech: Deváté srdce) is a 1979 Czechoslovak dark fantasy fairy tale romance film directed by Juraj Herz. The film starred Josef Kemr.

== Cast ==
- Ondřej Pavelka as Student Martin
- Anna Maľová as Puppeteer Tončka
- Julie Jurištová as Princess Adriena
- Josef Kemr as Principal, Tončka's father
- Juraj Kukura as Count Aldobrandini, astrologist
- František Filipovský as Jester
