= Já jsem Stěna smrti =

Já jsem Stěna smrti is a 1978 Czechoslovak film. The film starred Josef Kemr.
