= Oplatky =

1955 film

- For the wafer snack "oplatky", see Spa wafer.

Oplatky is a 1955 Czechoslovak film. The film starred Josef Kemr.
