= V trestném území =

1950 film

V trestném území is a 1950 Czechoslovak film. The film starred Josef Kemr.
