= Tie malé výlety =

Tie malé výlety is a 1972 Czechoslovak film. The film starred Josef Kemr.
