= Svatba jako řemen =

1967 Czechoslovak comedy film

- Directed by: Jiří Krejčík
- Screenplay by: Zdeněk Mahler; Jiří Krejčík
- Story by: Zdeněk Mahler
- Produced by: František Milič
- Starring: Jiří Hrzán; Vladimír Pucholt; Jan Vostrčil; Stella Zázvorková; František Filipovský; Věra Walterová; Pavel Landovský; Jan Schánilec; Iva Janžurová; Alena Hessová; Jan Libícek; Ilja Prachar; Ivana Karbanová; Anna Kratochvilova
- Cinematography: Josef Střecha
- Edited by: Josef Dobrichovský
- Music by: Zdeněk Liška
- Production company: Barrandov Studios
- Release date: 30 June 1967
- Running time: 94 minutes
- Country: Czechoslovakia
- Language: Czech language

Svatba jako řemen is a Czech comedy film directed by Jiří Krejčík and released in 1967.

The film tells the story of a man getting ready for his wedding, who, wanting to enjoy his freedom one last time, goes a little far and gets involved in an alleged rape. Two bumbling police officers are placed in charge of the investigation. Consequently, the groom gets arrested and doesn't manage to arrive to his wedding on time, causing his bride and her family anguish.
