= Černá sobota =

1960 film

Černá sobota (Black Saturday) is a 1960 Czechoslovak film. The film starred Josef Kemr.
