= Stavení =

Stavení is a 1990 Czechoslovak film. The film starred Josef Kemr.
