= Pinocchiova dobrodružství II. =

Pinocchiova dobrodružství II. is a 1970 Czechoslovak film directed by Zdenek Sirový. The film starred Josef Kemr, Ladislav Pesek, Josef Beyvl, and Frantisek Filipovský. Ladislav Pesek is credited as voice-acting Geppetto. It is based on the book The Adventures of Pinocchio by Carlo Collodi.
