= Zločin a trik II. =

Zločin a trik II. is a 1967 Czechoslovak film. The film starred Josef Kemr.

== Cast ==
- Vlastimil Bedrna
- Josef Hlinomaz
- Václav Kaňkovský
- Zuzana Šavrdová
