= Muzikant =

1948 film by František Čáp

Muzikant is a 1948 Czechoslovak black-and-white film directed by František Čáp starring Josef Kemr.

Čáp received the Czech state ward for directing the film.

== Cast ==
- Ludmila Vostrcilová
- Otýlie Benísková
- Jirina Bohdalová
- Hana Cermakova
- Ada Dohnal
- Josef Kemr
