= Zpívající pudřenka =

1959 film directed by Milan Vošmik

Zpívající pudřenka is a 1959 Czechoslovak film. The film starred Josef Kemr.
