= Prodaná nevěsta (film) =

1975 film

Prodaná nevěsta is a 1975 Czechoslovak film starring Josef Kemr. It is based on the comic opera The Bartered Bride by Bedřich Smetana.
