= Judgement Day (1949 film) =

- Directed by: Karel Steklý
- Written by: Karel Krpata; Karel Steklý
- Starring: Ladislav Pešek
- Edited by: Antonín Zelenka
- Release date: 11 November 1949
- Running time: 93 minutes
- Country: Czechoslovakia
- Language: Czech

Judgement Day (Czech: Soudný den) is a 1949 Czechoslovak comedy film directed by Karel Steklý. The film starred Josef Kemr.

== Cast ==
- Ladislav Pešek as Frantisek Kalous
- Josef Beyvl as Vojtech Stepán
- Jiřina Šejbalová as Málinka
- Helena Růžičková as Cilka
- Jaroslav Mareš as JUDr. Jan Zvonar
- František Vnouček as Honzícek
- Ota Motycka as Suk
- Jan Brandýs as Koudel
