= Šest černých dívek aneb Proč zmizel Zajíc =

Czechoslovak film (1969)

Šest černých dívek aneb Proč zmizel Zajíc is a 1969 Czechoslovak film. The film starred Josef Kemr.
