= Občan Brych =

- Directed by: Otakar Vávra
- Written by: Jan Otcenásek; Otakar Vávra
- Starring: Karel Höger
- Release date: 1958
- Running time: 107 minutes
- Country: Czechoslovakia
- Language: Czech

Občan Brych is a 1958 Czechoslovak film directed by Otakar Vávra. The film starred Josef Kemr.

== Cast ==
- Karel Höger as JUDr. Frantisek Brych
- Vlasta Fialová as Irena Rázová
- Otomar Krejca as Ondrej Ráz
- Zdenek Stepánek as Mizina
- Jaroslav Prucha as predseda komunisti Bartos
