= The Treasure of a Byzantine Merchant =

- Directed by: Ivo Novák
- Starring: Josef Kemr
- Release date: 1966
- Country: Czechoslovakia

The Treasure of a Byzantine Merchant (Czech: Poklad byzantského kupce) is a 1966 Czechoslovak film directed by Ivo Novák and starring Josef Kemr.
