= Nobody Knows Anything (film) =

1947 film

- Directed by: Josef Mach
- Written by: Josef Mach; Václav Mírovský; Petr Nedoma; Jaromír Pleskot; Jan Schmidt; Václav Spilar
- Produced by: Bohumil Smída
- Starring: Jaroslav Marvan; František Filipovský; Jana Dítětová
- Cinematography: Josef Strecha
- Edited by: Josef Dobrichovský
- Music by: Josef Stelibský
- Production company: Ceskoslovenská Filmová Spolecnost
- Distributed by: Ceskoslovenský Státní Film
- Release date: 28 November 1947
- Running time: 76 minutes
- Country: Czechoslovakia
- Language: Czech

Nobody Knows Anything (Czech: Nikdo nic neví) is a 1947 Czechoslovak war comedy film directed by Josef Mach and starring Jaroslav Marvan, František Filipovský and Jana Dítětová. The film's sets were designed by the art director Jan Zázvorka.

== Synopsis ==
It is a war comedy about two tram drivers who try to save their neighbor Věra who was blackmailed by an SA man.

== Cast ==
- Jaroslav Marvan as Martin Plechatý
- František Filipovský as Petr Nivý
- Jana Dítětová as Véra Budínová
- Eduard Linkers as Fritz Heinecke
- Stanislav Neumann as Skoula
- Robert Vrchota as Karel Bureš
- Ota Motyčka as Doorkeeper at Avion Hotel
- Josef Kotapis as Muz v kozeném plásti
- Jaroslav Seník as Kulisák Beran
- Richard Záhorský as Muz v klopeném klobouku
- Bedrich Bozdech as Reditel hotelu Avion
- Josef Pehr as Úredník hotelu Avion
- Eman Fiala as Kapelník - Conductor
- Rudolf Princ as Seladon
- Antonín Jirsa as Direktor
- Jirí Vondrovic as Inspicient
- J.O. Martin as Strázník
- Frantisek Marek as Vrátný hotelu Evropa
- Irena Svingerová as Pokojská hotelu Avion
- Karel Dvorak as Strázník v hotelu Avion
- Mnislav Hofman as Podomek hotelu Avion
- Karel Urban as SA-man - velitel
- Alois Dvorský as Zelinár
- Jirí Sovák as Hotel detective

== Bibliography ==
- Wohl, Eugen & Păcurar, Elena. Language of the Revolution: The Discourse of Anti-Communist Movements in the "Eastern Bloc" Countries: Case Studies. Springer Nature, 2023.
