= Náš dědek Josef =

1976 Czechoslovak film by Antonín Kachlík

Náš dědek Josef is a 1976 Czechoslovak film directed by Antonín Kachlík.

== Cast ==
- Bohus Záhorský as Grandpa Josef
- Svatopluk Skopal as Josef's grandson
- Frantisek Filipovský as shoemaker Jan "Prták" Pokorný
- Miroslav Homola as former municipal police officer Chroust
- Otomar Korbelár as Frantina "Santala" Oujezdský
- Josef Kemr as Francek, Oujezdský's son
