= Zlepšovák =

1960 film directed by Petr Schulhoff

Zlepšovák is a 1960 Czechoslovak film. The film starred Josef Kemr.
