= Long Live Ghosts! =

1977 Czechoslovak children's film

- Directed by: Oldřich Lipský
- Starring: Dana Vávrová; Jiří Sovák
- Edited by: Miroslav Hájek
- Release date: 1 November 1977
- Running time: 1h 25min
- Country: Czechoslovakia
- Language: Czech

Long Live Ghosts! (Czech: Ať žijí duchové!) is a 1977 Czechoslovak children's film directed by Oldřich Lipský.

== Cast ==
- Dana Vávrová - Leontýnka Brtník of Brtník
- Jiří Sovák - the knight Brtník of Brtník
- Vlastimil Brodský - Vávra, school principal
- Lubomír Lipský - Antonín Jouza, supermarket manager
