= Studujeme za školou =

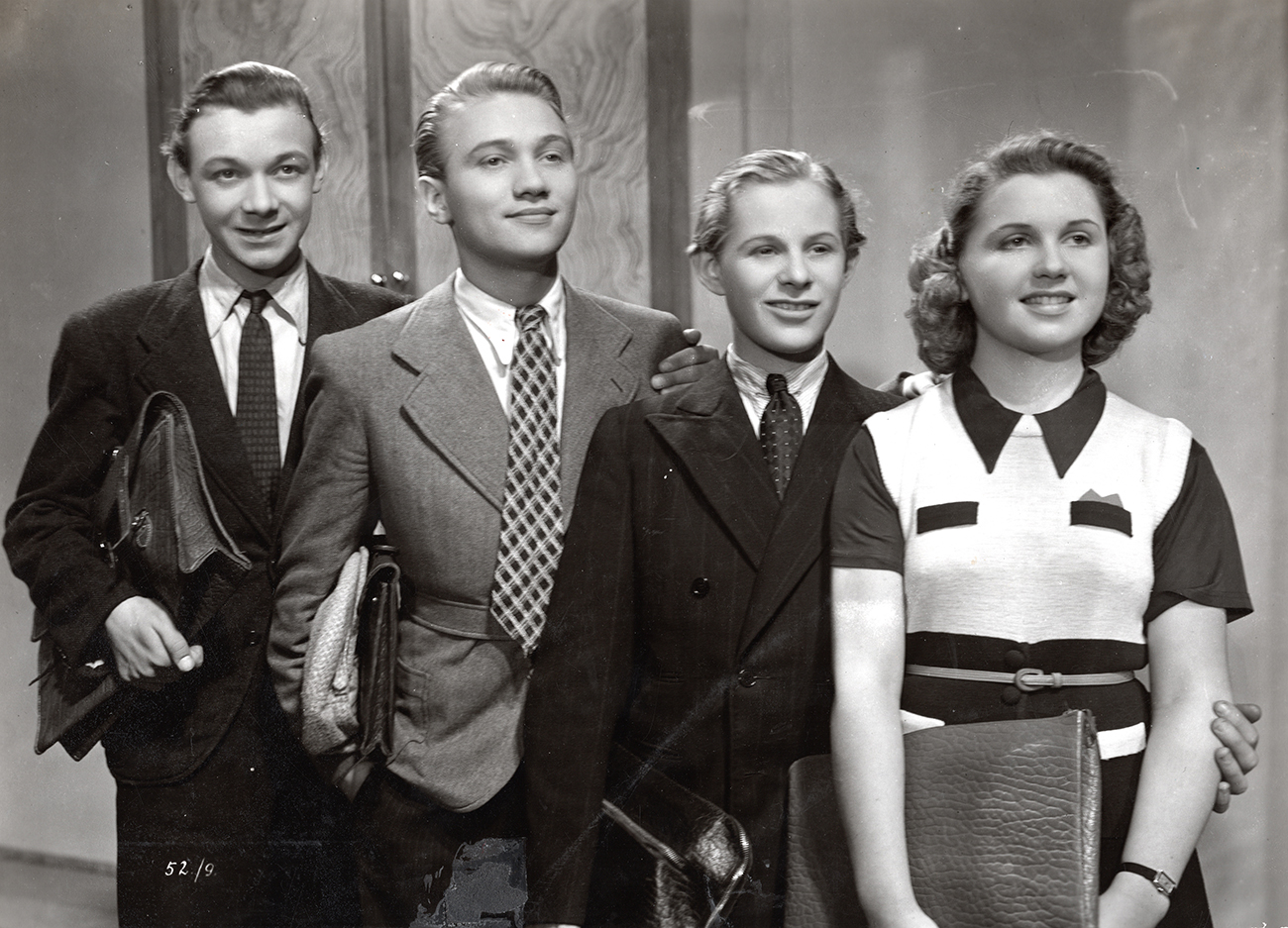
- Directed by: Miroslav Cikán
- Starring: Svatopluk Beneš, František Filipovský, Nataša Gollová
- Release date: 1939
- Country: Czechoslovakia

Studujeme za školou is a 1939 Czechoslovak comedy film, directed by Miroslav Cikán. It stars Svatopluk Beneš, František Filipovský and Nataša Gollová.
