= Jak se Franta naučil bát =

1959 Czechoslovak film

Jak se Franta naučil bát ("How Frank Met With Fear") is a 1959 Czechoslovak film. The film stars Josef Kemr and features Jana Andrsová.

== Cast ==
- Josef Kemr
- Frantisek Filipovský
- Ladislav Trojan
- Jana Andrsová-Vectomová
- Alena Kreuzmannová
