= The Merry Duel =

1950 film by Miloš Makovec

The Merry Duel (Czech: Veselý souboj) is a Czech comedy film. It was released in 1950.
