= Pantáta Bezoušek =

1941 film

Pantáta Bezoušek is a 1941 Czechoslovak film. The film starred Josef Kemr.
