= Rukavička =

1941 Czechoslovak film

Rukavička is a 1941 Czechoslovak film starring Josef Kemr.
