= Zkouška pokračuje =

1959 film Jaroslav Balík

Zkouška pokračuje is a 1959 Czechoslovak film. The film starred Josef Kemr.
