= Pohádka o staré tramvaji =

1961 film by Milan Vošmik

Pohádka o staré tramvaji (The Old Tram) is a 1961 Czechoslovak film. The film starred Josef Kemr.
