= Hledá se táta =

1961 film directed by Frank Daniel

Hledá se táta is a 1961 Czechoslovak film, starring Josef Kemr.
