= Getting on in the World =

1948 film

- Directed by: Karel Steklý
- Written by: Jan Morávek; Karel Steklý
- Starring: Ladislav Boháč
- Release date: 22 October 1948
- Running time: 112 minutes
- Country: Czechoslovakia
- Language: Czech

Getting on in the World (Czech: Kariéra) is a 1948 Czechoslovak drama film directed by Karel Steklý.

== Cast ==
- Ladislav Boháč as Karel Kubát - director fy Globus
- Marie Vásová as Pavla Ulrychová
- Eduard Linkers as Antonín Klika - banker
- Stanislav Langer as Vilém Julis - general director
- Jiřina Petrovická as Luisa
- Marie Rosulková as Mrs. Julisová
- Jarmila Kurandová as Mrs. Ulrychová
- Dana Medřická as Hermína - manicurist
- František Vnouček as Polák - redactor
- Karel Pavlík as Director of audit department
- František Filipovský as Servant
