= Čest a sláva =

Čest a sláva is a 1968 Czechoslovak film. It starred Josef Kemr.
