= Lemonade Joe =

1964 Czechoslovak New Wave Western musical parody film by Oldřich Lipský

Limonádový Joe
- Directed by: Oldřich Lipský
- Written by: Jiří Brdečka; Oldřich Lipský
- Produced by: Jaroslav Jílovec
- Starring: Karel Fiala; Miloš Kopecký; Květa Fialová; Olga Schoberová
- Music by: Jan Rychlík; Vlastimil Hála
- Production companies: Bratri v Triku; Kratky Film Praha; Barrandov Studios (live action)
- Distributed by: Ústřední Půjčovna Filmů v Praze; Allied Artists Pictures Corporation (US release)
- Release dates: August 28, 1964 (East Germany); October 1964 (Czechoslovakia)
- Running time: 99 minutes
- Country: Czechoslovakia
- Language: Czech

Lemonade Joe, Or The Horse Opera (Czech: Limonádový Joe Aneb Koňská Opera) is a 1964 Czechoslovak New Wave Western musical parody film directed by Oldřich Lipský and written by Jiří Brdečka, based on his novel and stage play.

A parody of the American Western, the film centers on a clean-living, soft-drink-selling gunfighter who takes on a town full of whiskey-swilling cowboys. The name of the eponymous hero is a pun, since the Czech word for a soft drink, limonáda, can also be used figuratively in reference to a cheap, sentimental love-story.

== Plot ==
In the frontier town of Stetson City, Arizona, in 1885, business is booming at the Trigger Whisky Saloon. Tornado Lou, the local chanteuse, regales the saloon-goers with a sultry ballad ("Když v báru houstne dým"), while the saloon owner Doug Badman tries in vain to woo her. Two evangelists, Ezra Goodman and his daughter Winnifred, enter the bar attempting to drum up interest in their temperance movement, but the saloon's hard-drinking cowboys scorn them. Into the fracas steps a stranger: Lemonade Joe, a lone cowboy singing the praises of Kolaloka, a non-alcoholic soft drink (in Czech, limonáda, hence the name; the name is throughout the film pronounced phonetically yoh-eh, as a tongue-in-cheek hommage to a practice common among the Czech fans of Wild West novels at the time). His superior gunfighting skill quickly convinces the saloon-goers of the benefits of teetotalism. Before long, Joe and the Goodmans have joined forces, Joe has begun courting Winnifred, and all the cowboys in Stetson City have transferred their loyalty to the cathedral-like God Bless Kolaloka Saloon ("Arizóna, to je pravých mužů zóna").

Doug Badman's business is saved by the arrival of his brother Horace, alias "Hogofogo, the Master Criminal of the Wild West". In a dramatic public appearance, Hogofogo convinces the Kolaloka customers to go back to Trigger Whisky, and soon the old saloon is back in business ("Whisky to je moje gusto"). Joe, unaware of the developments, is riding on the prairie ("Sou fár tů jů áj méj") until, thanks to a mirage, he discovers that Hogofogo has his own designs on Winnifred. Joe saves Winnifred from his clutches, but in the ensuing fight, his account book falls to the ground. Reading it, Winnifred discovers the truth: Joe is not the selfless hero he appears, but rather a traveling salesman for Kolalok & Son, makers of Kolaloka. Delighted at the news, Winnifred pledges her love for Joe. However, the chanteuse Tornado Lou has also fallen for Joe, imagining him as the ideal lover who will make her "different, better."

Joe returns to Trigger Whisky Saloon, where, in another display of fighting skill, he wins the customers back to Kolaloka once again ("Můj bóže, můj bóže"). Hogofogo, in disguise, attempts to shoot Joe, but Joe instead engages him in a gunfighting chase through the town, trying to force him into signing a testimonial in favor of Kolaloka. Though Hogofogo seems momentarily to have the upper hand ("Horácova polka"), Tornado Lou attacks Hogofogo and saves Joe's life. Joe, too commercially oriented to understand her devotion, spurns her advances. In misery, she vows to help the Badmans lure Joe to his death. Their plan begins with Hogofogo, now disguised as a blind piano tuner ("Horácův pohřební blues"), kidnapping Winnifred as a bait to lure Joe to Dead Man's Valley ("Balada Mexico Kida"). There, the Badmans' henchmen, led by Grimpo, capture him and torture him, but Lou has a change of heart and saves his life again, reuniting him with Winnifred. Meanwhile, Hogofogo waits for his henchmen to deliver Winnifred to his room. Instead, Joe appears and forces him to sign the testimonial. Hogofogo, taking advantage of Joe's aversion to spirits, ambushes him with a volley of gunshot and leaves him dead.

Hogofogo tracks Winnifred down to the Stetson City cemetery, where he attempts once again to kidnap her. When the now-moral Tornado Lou stops him, he kills her; in revenge, Doug Badman kills Hogofogo, and in his death throes, Hogofogo kills Doug. Just as he is about to shoot Winnifred, Lemonade Joe enters alive and well; surveying the three dead bodies, he notices their birthmarks and discovers that they are his long-lost siblings. He revives them with the same medicine that has just brought him back to life: the miraculous soft drink Kolaloka. Joe's father—none other than Mr. Kolalok himself, owner of Kolalok & Son—enters just in time for a happy ending, in which villains and heroes alike agree to work together and merge their businesses to create a new drink, Whiskola. The entire Kolalok family, including the newly married Winnifred and Joe, ride off into the sunset in a stagecoach as the population of Stetson City cheer.

== Cast ==
- Karel Fiala as Lemonade Joe, salesman for Kolalok & Son
- Rudolf Deyl Jr. as Doug Badman, owner of Trigger Whisky Saloon
- Miloš Kopecký as Horace Badman, alias "Hogofogo"
- Květa Fialová as Tornado Lou, the Arizona Warbler
- Olga Schoberová as Winnifred Goodman
- Bohuš Záhorský as Ezra Goodman, Winnifred's father
- Josef Hlinomaz as Gunslinger Grimpo
- Karel Effa as Pancho Kid, gunslinger
- Waldemar Matuška as Coyotte Kid, gunslinger
- Eman Fiala as Pianist
- Vladimír Menšík as Barman #1
- Jiří Lír as Barman #2
- Jiří Steimar as Mr. Kolalok, Joe's Father

== Themes ==
Lemonade Joe is, most prominently, a parody of clichés found in American Westerns. In addition, it includes a running satire of American capitalism and cultural imperialism—values embodied by the soft drink Kolaloka, the name of which is a clear parody of Coca-Cola. (In the earliest version of the Lemonade Joe stories, the drink was called Kolakoka, an even more unambiguous reference.) However, it is highly ambiguous whether the satire is intended as a serious critique of the capitalist system; indeed, values officially promoted in Eastern European countries of the time are implicitly satirized as well, with the plot culminating in a reconciliation and compromise between the two. The film's screenwriter, Jiří Brdečka, wrote that his main satiric target was the undertone of commercialism running through classic American westerns, explaining that the satire:

...was not addressed to the myth (that is myth of the West) but rather to the abuse of this myth. Hypocritically moral gunman, ensuring his popularity by consumption of lemonade – that is an illustration of business with a myth.

Numerous scholars have commented on the film's multiple layers of thematic parody. The historian Peter Bischoff suggested that, while the film seems to parody the American capitalist system, it also functions as a thinly disguised critique of communism. The academician Anikó Imre noted that "by ridiculing the racist and sexist framework of the Western genre," Lemonade Joe also implicitly satirizes the rigid ideology of the Soviet government in the 1960s. The cultural anthropologist Cynthia Miller concludes that the film "both glorifies and mocks the wonders of capitalist enterprise, and in so doing, creates a meeting ground between Maysian [i.e. Karl May-like] celebration and contemporary Soviet denunciation of all things West."

== Production ==
=== Sources ===
Stories about the American frontier, such as those by Karl May and Jack London, had long been widely read in Central Europe; May's influence in particular was crucial to the Eastern European imagination of the American West. American Western films had been popular in Czech theatres throughout the history of the First Republic of Czechoslovakia, from its founding in 1918 until the German occupation of Czechoslovakia in 1939. During the occupation and throughout Joseph Stalin's control of the Soviet Union, Westerns were banned. In the early 1960s, during Nikita Khrushchev's De-Stalinization of the Soviet Union, Westerns began to reappear in Czechoslovakia, with films such as High Noon, The Big Country, and The Magnificent Seven screened in theatres.

Jiří Brdečka, a prolific Czech screenwriter and satirist, created the Lemonade Joe character in a 1940 serial, a parody of dime novels commissioned by the popular magazine Ahoj na neděli. As the serial progressed, however, the target of the satire shifted from dime novels to Western epics; Brdečka was a self-professed fan of Westerns, citing Stagecoach, Wells Fargo (1937), and Frontier Marshal (1939) as the films that sparked his interest in the genre. Brdečka also wrote a nonfiction work about the American frontier, Kolty bez pozlátka (1956), de-mythologizing the iconic Western figures of Wild Bill Hickok, Billy the Kid, and Jesse James.

The Lemonade Joe stories were adapted as a stage play in 1946, which was a pronounced popular success. The stories also inspired the 1949 stop-motion animation short film Song of the Prairie (where the Lemonade Joe theme song, "Sou Fár Tu Jú Aj Mej", appeared for the first time) as well as two other animated films: Dušan Vukotić's Cowboy Jimmie (Yugoslavia, 1957) and Witold Giersz's Maly Western ("The Little Western," Poland, 1961).

=== Filming ===
The Stetson City facades were built at the Czech film studios at Barrandov. Location shooting was done near Karlštejn Castle, in a former quarry that had been nicknamed "Amerika" since the nineteenth century for its similarity to the American West. An authentic Smith & Wesson gun, used as a prop by Joe, was borrowed from a local museum and restored especially for the film.

In creating a filming style, director Oldrich Lipský was inspired by silent comedy films, from which he borrowed numerous effects, including film tinting, slow motion, and fast motion. Brdečka's experience as an animator, often in collaboration with Jiří Trnka, led to several effects and ideas derived from animation being incorporated into the film, including animated smoke rings and dotted lines for bullet paths, freeze frames for dramatic effect, and even a reference to the Acme Corporation from the Looney Tunes cartoons.

The film includes specific parodic tributes to Western silent film actors such as William S. Hart and Tom Mix, as well as "singing cowboy" stars like Gene Autry, Tex Ritter, and Fred Scott. The film also evokes numerous other films, including Louis Feuillade's silent film serials, the 1911 Jack Conway Western Arizona Bill, and the works of John Ford, including My Darling Clementine. Tornado Lou's character suggests Marlene Dietrich's character in another classic Western film, Destry Rides Again, and Hogofogo is likely modeled on John Carradine's character in Stagecoach (1939).

=== Music ===
The film's score matches the eclecticism of the story's sources, including honky-tonk piano pieces as well as traditional jazz and other genres. Joe's songs were dubbed by the "Golden Voice of Prague," Karel Gott, and the less popular singer Waldemar Matuška was cast for a small role including a solo.

== Release and reception ==
Lemonade Joe was released in Czechoslovakia on 16 October 1964. In the same year, the film was widely released in other Soviet bloc countries (including Cuba, where it became the first Western shown on screen since the Cuban government's 1961 ban on Hollywood Westerns). In Czechoslovakia, it was the best-selling film of the 1960s.

Czech critical reactions were mostly positive, although several critics, such as Otakar Váňa, felt that the second half was too slow-moving and too sharp in its political satire. Some reviews expressed disappointment that the film's parodic content would largely be lost on Czechoslovak audiences, since American Westerns were rarely screened.

The film enjoys a near-iconic status in the Czech Republic as well as a considerable cult following, and Henry Fonda was reportedly among its foreign admirers. The film was selected as the Czechoslovakia entry for the Best Foreign Language Film at the 37th Academy Awards, but was not accepted as a nominee.

== Legacy ==
In the mid-1980s, when Mikhail Gorbachev introduced measures to limit Soviet alcohol consumption, critics nicknamed him "Lemonade Joe" in a nod to the film.

Bulgarian middle-distance runner Atanas Atanasov was nicknamed "Joko" throughout his career, derived from combining his Bulgarian name with the "Lemonade Joe" protagonist. The nickname also extended to his son, long jumper Nikolay Atanasov.

== See also ==
- Ostern/Red Western
- Revisionist Western
- Acid Western
- List of submissions to the 37th Academy Awards for Best Foreign Language Film
- List of Czechoslovakia submissions for the Academy Award for Best Foreign Language Film

== Notes ==
=== Citations ===
- Eaton, William J. (26 October 1985), "'Lemonade Joe's' Crackdown: Soviet Anti-Alcohol Drive Changing Nation's Habits", Los Angeles Times
- Figueredo, D. H. (2015), Revolvers and Pistolas, Vaqueros and Caballeros: Debunking the Old West, Santa Monica: Praeger, ISBN 9781440829192
- Hames, Peter (7 October 2002), "Way out west: Oldřich Lipský's Limonádovy Joe aneb koňská opera (Lemonade Joe, 1964)", Kinoeye, 2 (5)
- Hemelíková, Blanka (2007), "Jiří Brdečka", Slovník české literatury po roce 1945, Ústav pro českou literaturu
- Imre, Anikó (2009), Identity Games: Globalization and the Transformation of Media Cultures in the New Europe, Cambridge, Massachusetts: MIT Press, ISBN 9780262090452
- Johnston, Rosie (20 March 2008), "Lemonade Joe: soft-drink purveying cowboy and cult Czech figure", Radio Prague
- Miller, Cynthia J. (2014), "Comedy, Capitalism, and Kolaloka: Adapting the American West in Lemonade Joe", in Miller, Cynthia J.; Van Riper, A. Bowdoin (eds.), International Westerns: Re-Locating the Frontier, Lanham, MD: Scarecrow Press, pp. 104–120, ISBN 9780810892880
- Mléčková, Kateřina (2006), Western Goes East: Limonádový Joe and its possible interpretations (PDF) (thesis), Masaryk University
