= Tři kamarádi =

1947 film

Tři kamarádi is a 1947 Czechoslovak film based on the novel Drei Kameraden by Erich Maria Remarque. The film starred Josef Kemr.
