= Zítra to roztočíme, drahoušku...! =

1976 Czechoslovak comedy film

Zítra to roztočíme, drahoušku…! is a Czechoslovak comedy film released in 1976.
