= Haškovy povídky ze starého mocnářství =

1952 film by Miroslav Hubáček

Haškovy povídky ze starého mocnářství is a 1952 Czechoslovak comedy film directed by Miroslav Hubáček. The film starred Josef Kemr.
