= Jaroslav Hasek's Exemplary Cinematograph =

1955 film directed by Oldřich Lipský

Jaroslav Hasek's Exemplary Cinematograph (Czech: Vzorný kinematograf Haška Jaroslava) is a 1955 Czechoslovak comedy film directed by Oldřich Lipský. The film starred Josef Kemr.
