= Lov na mamuta =

1964 Czechoslovak film

Lov na mamuta is a 1964 Czechoslovak film. The film starred Josef Kemr.
