= Muž v povětří =

- Directed by: Miroslav Cikán
- Starring: Vlasta Burian, Milka Balek-Brodská, and Z. Chalupník.
- Release date: 1956
- Running time: 86 minute
- Country: Czechoslovakia

Muž v povětří is a 1956 Czechoslovak comedy film, directed by Miroslav Cikán. It stars Vlasta Burian, Milka Balek-Brodská, and Z. Chalupník.
