= U nás v Mechově =

1960 film by Vladimír Sís

U nás v Mechově is a 1960 Czechoslovak film. The film starred Josef Kemr.
