= Leave It to Me (1955 film) =

1955 film

- Directed by: Martin Frič
- Written by: Miloš Forman; Martin Frič
- Starring: Oldřich Nový
- Cinematography: Rudolf Stahl
- Edited by: Jan Kohout
- Release date: 1955
- Running time: 73 minutes
- Country: Czechoslovakia
- Language: Czech

Leave It to Me (Czech: Nechte to na mně) is a 1955 Czech comedy film directed by Martin Frič.

== Cast ==
- Oldřich Nový as Patocka
- Theodor Pištěk as Rokos
- František Kreuzmann as Kalousek
- Vladimír Repa as Pinc
- Bela Jurdová as Anci
- Zdeňka Baldová
- Vladimír Klemens
- Cestmír Studna
