= Odvážná slečna =

1969 Czechoslovak film

Odvážná slečna is a 1969 Czechoslovak film. The film starred Josef Kemr.
