= Větrná hora =

1955 film by Jiří Sequens

Větrná hora is a 1955 Czechoslovak film. The film starred Josef Kemr.
