= Music from Mars =

1955 Czech comedy film

Music from Mars (Czech: Hudba z Marsu) is a 1955 Czechoslovak comedy film directed by Ján Kadár and Elmar Klos. The film starred Josef Kemr.

== Cast ==
- Jaroslav Marvan
- Oldrich Nový
- Josef Bek
- Alena Vránová
- Frantisek Kovárík
