= Nejlepší člověk =

1954 film by Václav Wasserman

- Directed by: Ivo Novák; Václav Wasserman
- Written by: Josef Neuberg; Václav Wasserman; Václav Stech
- Edited by: Miroslav Hájek
- Release date: 1954
- Running time: 109 minute
- Language: Czech

Nejlepší člověk is a Czech comedy film. It was released in 1954.

== Cast ==
- Vlasta Burian
- Stanislav Neumann
- Václav Vydra
- Felix Le Breux
- stavitel Josef Kopr
- Milos Kopecký
