= Procesí k Panence =

1961 film by Vojtěch Jasný

Procesí k Panence is a 1961 Czechoslovak film. The film starred Josef Kemr.
