= O věcech nadpřirozených =

1958 anthology film

O věcech nadpřirozených is a 1958 Czechoslovak film. The film was directed by Jirí Krejcík, Jaroslav Mach, and Milos Makovec, and starred Josef Kemr.
