= You Are a Widow, Sir =

1970 Czechoslovak comedy film

You Are a Widow, Sir (Czech: Pane, vy jste vdova!) is a 1970 Czechoslovak comedy science fiction film directed by Václav Vorlíček. It stars Iva Janžurová and Olga Schoberová.

== Plot ==
In the near future Rosebud IV, king of a fictional European kingdom, decides to disband his army after an unfortunate accident that resulted in a serious injury of his cousin. This frightens the army generals, who decide to eliminate the king in a subtle way. At the clinic of the famous professor Sommer, they have a duplicate of the famous actress Evelyna Kelletti made from veal and intend to implant into this body the brain of the sadistic murderer Ms Stub, who has been already sentenced to death for her crimes. She is then supposed to take care of eliminating the king, who is the actress's admirer.

Meanwhile, army officer Bobo, whose mistake resulted in the injury of king's cousin, has been released from the army. Bobo wants to know his future and asks his friend, the renowned astrologer Stuart Hample, to read his horoscope. The positions of the stars tell a very confusing prediction: Stuart will be killed, then Bobo saves his life, after this Stuart will become a widow, and ultimately he marries his dream love, the young actress Molly, who is the girlfriend of one of the army conspirators Major Steiner.

King Rosebud IV also uses Hample's services and learns that an assassination attempt is being planned on him. He orders his army officers General Otis and Major Steiner to investigate, not knowing that they are the ones who are planning the assassination. Otis and Steiner promptly decide that Hample is too dangerous and must be eliminated.

Hample is murdered and his brain is destined for archiving but the autopsy attendant makes a mistake with the brain of Ms Stub, and Hample's brain ends up inside the duplicate of Evelyna Kelleti. A whirlwind of confusions, misunderstandings and assassinations begins.
