= Cirkus bude! =

1954 film by Oldřich Lipský

- Directed by: Oldrich Lipský
- Written by: Oldrich Lipský; Vratislav Blazek; Ivan Osvald
- Release date: 1954
- Running time: 91 minute
- Country: Czechoslovakia
- Language: Czech

Cirkus bude! is a 1954 Czechoslovak comedy film directed by Oldřich Lipský. The film starred Josef Kemr.

== Cast ==
- Jaroslav Marvan - reditel cirkusu Liska
- Rudolf Hrusínský - Gustav Bláha
- Frantisek Filipovský - Ostrý
- Irena Kacírková - pokladní Marie
