= 2011 Czech Lion Awards =

Czech film award ceremony

19th Czech Lion Awards
- Date: March 4, 2012
- Site: Lucerna, Prague

Television coverage
- Network: Česká televize

2011 Czech Lion Awards ceremony was held on 4 March 2012.

== Winners and nominees ==
Best Film	Best Director
Flower Buds – Viktor Schwarcz; Alois Nebel – Pavel Strnad; Innocence – Rudolf Biermann; Leaving – Jaroslav Bouček; Long Live the Family! – Radim Procházka (Produkce Radim Procházka)	Flower Buds – Zdeněk Jiráský; Alois Nebel – Tomáš Luňák; Innocence – Jan Hřebejk; Leaving – Václav Havel; Long Live the Family! – Robert Sedláček
Best Actor in a Leading Role	Best Actress in a Leading Role
Vladimír Javorský – Flower Buds; Karel Roden – Lidice; Miroslav Krobot – The House; Josef Abrhám – Leaving; Ondřej Vetchý – Vendeta	Anna Geislerová – Innocence; Dagmar Havlová – Leaving; Ivana Chýlková – Perfect Days; Malgorzata Pikus – Flower Buds; Eva Vrbková – Long Live the Family!
Best Actor in a Supporting Role	Best Actress in a Supporting Role
Hynek Čermák – Innocence; Karel Roden – Alois Nebel; Oldřich Kaiser – Leaving; Ondřej Sokol – Perfect Days; Oldřich Kaiser – Vendeta	Taťjana Medvecká – The House; Anna Linhartová – Innocence; Vlasta Chramostová – Leaving; Vlasta Chramostová – Perfect Days; Simona Babčáková – Long Live the Family!
Best Screenplay	Best Documentary
Best Cinematography	Best Editing
Flower Buds – Vladimír Smutný; Alois Nebel – Jan Baset Střítežský; Lidice – Antonio Riestra; Leaving – Jan Malíř; Vendeta – Martin Štrba	Leaving – Jiří Brožek; Alois Nebel – Petr Říha; Lidice – Adam Dvořák; Innocence – Vladimír Barák; Flower Buds – Petr Turyna
Music	Sound
Alois Nebel – Petr Kružík, Ondřej Ježek; Innocence – Vladivojna La Chia; Leaving – Michal Pavlíček; Flower Buds – Martin Přikryl; Vendeta – Petr Ostrouchov	Alois Nebel – Viktor Ekrt, Ondřej Ježek; Lidice – Marek Hart; Leaving – Viktor Ekrt, Pavel Rejholec; Flower Buds – Daniel Němec; Long Live the Family! – Radim Hladík ml.
Design	Unique Contribution to Czech Film
Alois Nebel – Jaromír 99, Henrich Boraros, Noro Držiak; Autopohádky – Pavel Koutský, Michal Žabka, Barbora Dlouhá, Libor Pixa; Fimfarum - Do třetice všeho dobrého – Denisa Grimmová-Abrhámová, Petr Poš, Patricia Ortiz-Martínez; Leaving – Ondřej Nekvasil, Zuzana Ježková, Zdeněk Klika, Karel Vaňásek, Jiří Kylian; Flower Buds – Jan Novotný, Jaromír Pesr, Iva Rašková, Lucie Lišková	Josef Somr

=== Non-statutory Awards ===
Most Popular Film	Best Foreign Film
Film Critics' Award for Best Film	Film Critics' Award Best Documentary
Best Film Poster	Magnesie Award for Best Student Film
