= List of Czech Television original films =

This article lists all films, documentary films and specials produced for release by Czech Television, a Czech public television broadcaster.

== Original films ==
=== Theatrical films ===
Original title	English title	Genre	Release date	Runtime
Zdivočelá země	The Land Gone Wild	Adventure	1997	114 minutes
Malý pán	The Little Man	Animated adventure	2015	83 minutes
Masaryk	A Prominent Patient	Historical	2016	113 minutes
Němá tajemství	The Exhale	Psychological crime drama	2023	107 minutes
Manželé Stodolovi	Mr. and Mrs. Stodola	crime drama	2024	107 minutes
Sucho	Dry Season	drama	2024	112 minutes

=== Television films ===
Original title	English title	Genre	Release date	Runtime
Kadeř královny Bereniké		Drama	1993	47 Minutes
Sedmero krkavců	The Seven Ravens	Fairy Tale	1993	81 Minutes
Zámek v Čechách		Drama	1993	93 Minutes
Zelený rytíř	Green Knight	Romantic Fairy Tale	1993	56 Minutes
O zlatém pokladu		Fairy Tale	1994	75 Minutes
Generál Eliáš		Historical Drama	1995	74 Minutes
O králi, hvězdáři, kejklíři a třech muzikantech		Fairy Tale	1996	60 Minutes
Travis	Travis	Horror	1996	78 Minutes
Cyprián a bezhlavý prapradědeček		Fairy Tale	1997	48 Minutes
RumplCimprCampr	RumplCimprCampr	Fairy Tale	1997	90 Minutes
Vojtík a duchové		Fairy Tale	1997	47 Minutes
Zkřížené meče		Fairy Tale	1998	67 Minutes
Zvonící meče		Fairy Tale	2000	62 Minutes
Český Robinson	Czech Robinson	Drama	2001	180 Minutes
Vůně vanilky		Drama	2001	85 minutes
Zázračné meče		Romantic Fairy Tale	2001	64 Minutes
Žabák	Žabák	Adventure	2001	53 minutes
Nevěsta s velkýma nohama		Fairy Tale	2002	75 Minutes
O Ječmínkovi		Fairy Tale	2003	68 Minutes
O svatební krajce		Romantic Fairy Tale	2003	78 Minutes
Smrt pedofila		Drama	2003	85 Minutes
Království potoků		Fairy Tale	2005	78 Minutes
Tajemství Lesní země		Fairy Tale	2006	70 Minutes
Operace Silver A	Operation Silver A	War	2007	149 minutes
Pán hradu		Fairy Tale	2007	95 Minutes
Tři srdce		Fairy Tale	2007	75 Minutes
Tři životy		Fairy Tale	2007	77 Minutes
BrainStorm	BrainStorm	Comedy Drama	2008	80 Minutes
Daleko do Nashvillu	A Long Way to Nashville	Adventure	2008	34 Minutes
Kouzla králů		Fairy Tale	2008	75 Minutes
Šejdrem		Psychological Comedy	2008	97 Minutes
Ztracený princ		Adventure Fairy Tale	2008	68 Minutes
Láska rohatá		Fairy Tale	2009	90 Minutes
Škola princů		Fairy Tale	2010	72 Minutes
Alma	Alma	drama	2011	98 minutes
Dům U Zlatého úsvitu		Fairy Tale	2011	93 Minutes
Santiniho jazyk	Santini's Enigma	Thriller	2011	90 minutes
Sráči		Crime Comedy	2011	91 Minutes
Tajemství staré bambitky	The Old Blunderbuss Mystery	Fairy Tale	2011	86 Minutes
Dvanáct měsíčků	Month's Rulers	Fairy Tale	2012	97 Minutes
Šťastný smolař	Lucky Loser	Fairy Tale	2012	100 Minutes
Duch nad zlato	The Gracious Ghost	Fairy Tale	2013	92 Minutes
Případ pro rybáře		Crime	2013	78 Minutes
Sněžný drak	Snow Dragon	Fantasy	2013	89 minutes
Kdyby byly ryby		Fairy Tale	2014	95 Minutes
Na druhý pohled	At Second Glance	Drama	2014	70 Minutes
Osmy	Wisdom Teeth	Comedy drama	2014	82 Minutes
Poslední cyklista	Last of the Cyclists	War drama	2014	166 Minutes
Piknik (2014 film)	Piknik	Drama	2014	80 Minutes
Princezna a písař	Princess and the Scribe	Fairy tale	2014	81 Minutes
Americké dopisy	The American Letters	Historical	2015	102 minutes
Korunní princ	Crown Prince	Fairy tale	2015	92 minutes
Jan Hus	Jan Hus	Historical	2015	240 minutes
Případ pro lyžaře		Crime	2015	69 Minutes
Případ pro malíře		Crime	2015	71 Minutes
Svatojánský věneček	The Midsummer Wreath	Fairy tale	2015	97 Minutes
Vánoční království		Fairy Tale	2015	26 Minutes
Hlas pro římského krále	A Vote for the King of the Romans	Historical	2016	104 minutes
Každý milion dobrý		Psychological drama	2016	90 minutes
Nepovedený čert		Fairy Tale	2016	29 Minutes
Pravý rytíř	A True Knight	Fairy Tale	2016	79 Minutes
Slíbená princezna	The Promised Princess	Fairy Tale	2016	106 Minutes
Zločin v Polné	Murder in Polná	Historical crime	2016	172 minutes
Nejkrásnější dar		Fairy Tale	2017	32 Minutes
Nejlepší přítel	Best Friend	Fairy Tale	2017	97 Minutes
Bůh s námi - od defenestrace k Bílé hoře	May the Lord Be with Us	Historical	2018	77 minutes
Doktor Martin: Záhada v Beskydech	Doctor Martin: The Mystery of Beskid Mountains	Crime Comedy	2018	90 Minutes
Dukla 61	Dukla 61	Disaster	2018	154 minutes
Kouzelník Žito		Fairy Tale	2018	104 Minutes
Poslední slovo Charlotty Garrigue Masarykové		Documentary	2018	67 minutes
Rašín	Rašín	Historical	2018	142 minutes
Metanol	Methanol	Crime	2018	179 minutes
Můj strýček Archimedes	My Uncle Archimedes	Comedy	2018	90 minutes
O zakletém králi a odvážném Martinovi	Christmas Wish	Fairy Tale	2018	80 Minutes
Trojí život	Triple Life	Comedy	2018	80 minutes
Vodníkova princezna		Fairy Tale	2018	35 Minutes
Kde bydlí strašidla		Fairy Tale	2019	35 Minutes
Klec	The Cage	Thriller	2019	87 minutes
Princezna a půl království		Fairy Tale	2019	92 Minutes
Případ dvou básníků		Crime	2019	73 Minutes
Případ dvou manželek		Crime	2019	72 Minutes
Případ dvou sester		Crime	2019	75 Minutes
Loupežnická balada		Fairy Tale	2020	38 Minutes
O vánoční hvězdě	The Christmas Star	Fairy Tale	2020	92 Minutes
O léčivé vodě	About the Healing Water	Adventure Romantic Fairy Tale	2020	90 Minutes
Stockholmský syndrom	Stockholm Syndrome	crime thriller	2020	148 minutes
Vysoká hra		Crime thriller	2020	179 minutes
Jak si nevzít princeznu	How Not to Marry a Princess	Fairy Tale	2021	91 Minutes
O kouzelné rybí kostičce		Fairy Tale	2021	35 Minutes
Klíč svatého Petra		Fairy Tale	2022	91 Minutes
Dvě Mařenky		Fairy Tale	2023	60 Minutes
Krakonošovo tajemství	Krakonoš's Secret	Fairy Tale	2023	99 Minutes
Případ s koncem		Crime	2023	76 Minutes
Případ se štěnicí		Crime	2023	78 Minutes
Tři zlaté dukáty	Three Golden Ducats	Fairy Tale	2023	84 Minutes
Život hledáčkem Petra Bruknera		Documentary	2023	26 minutes
Čarodějnická pohádka		Fairy Tale	2024	
Čarovné jablko		Fairy Tale	2024	90 Minutes
Svatá		Drama	2024	84 minutes
Smetana	Smetana	Historical	2024	101 Minutes
Tři princezny	Three Princesses	Fairy Tale	2024	95 Minutes
Když lumpa trápí pumpa		Comedy	2025	
Kotrmelce pana herce	Mr. Actor's Stumbles	Comedy	2025	64 Minutes
Tom je v tom		Comedy	2025	
