= 2006 Czech Lion Awards =

Czech film award ceremony

14th Czech Lion Awards
- Date: March 3, 2007
- Site: Lucerna, Prague
- Hosted by: Igor Chmela

Highlights
- Best Picture: I Served the King of England
- Best Actor: Jiří Schmitzer; Beauty in Trouble
- Best Actress: Anna Geislerová; Beauty in Trouble
- Best Supporting Actor: Martin Huba; I Served the King of England
- Best Supporting Actress: Jana Brejchová; Beauty in Trouble
- Most awards: I Served the King of England (4)
- Most nominations: I Served the King of England (10)

Television coverage
- Network: Česká televize

2006 Czech Lion Awards ceremony was held on 3 March 2007.

== Winners and nominees ==
Best Film	Best Director
I Served the King of England	I Served the King of England - Jiří Menzel
Best Actor in a Leading Role	Best Actress in a Leading Role
Jiří Schmitzer - Beauty in Trouble	Anna Geislerová - Beauty in Trouble
Best Actor in a Supporting Role	Best Actress in a Supporting Role
Martin Huba - I Served the King of England	Jana Brejchová - Beauty in Trouble
Best Screenplay	Design
Rules of Lies - Robert Sedláček	Fimfarum 2 - Pavel Koutský, Petr Poš, Martin Velíšek, Jan Balej
Best Cinematography	Best Editing
I Served the King of England - Jaromír Šofr	Pleasant Moments - Jiří Brožek
Music	Sound
Grandhotel - Jan P. Muchow	Grandhotel - Pavel Rejholec, Jakub Čech

=== Non-statutory Awards ===
Most Popular Film	Unique Contribution to Czech Film
Rafters	Ivan Passer
Film Critics' Award	Best Foreign Film
Rules of Lies	Volver
Sazka Award for Unrealised Script	Best Film Poster
An Earthly Paradise for the Eyes	I Served the King of England
