= 1993 Czech Lion Awards =

Czech film award ceremony

1st Czech Lion Awards
- Date: February 27, 1994
- Site: Lucerna Palace, Prague
- Hosted by: Roman Holý, Miloš Kohout.

Highlights
- Best Picture: Big Beat
- Best Actor: Josef Abrhám; Big Beat
- Best Actress: Jiřina Bohdalová; The Immortal Woman
- Most awards: Big Beat (4)

Television coverage
- Network: Česká televize

1993 Czech Lion Awards ceremony was held on 25 February 1994.

== Winners ==
Best Film	Best Director
Big Beat	Jan Hřebejk — Big Beat
Best Actor	Best Actress
Josef Abrhám — Big Beat	Jiřina Bohdalová — The Immortal Woman
Best Screenplay	Best Editing
Václav Šašek — Helimadoe	Jiří Brožek — Horror Story
Design	Best Cinematography
Jaroslav Brabec — Horror Story	Jaroslav Brabec — Horror Story
Music	Unique Contribution to Czech Film
Ivan Hlas — Big Beat	František Vláčil

=== Non-statutory Awards ===
Best Foreign Film	Most Popular Film
Blade Runner	Jurassic Park
Worst Film	Cinema Readers' Award
The Canary Connection	Big Beat
