= Josef Abrhám =

Czech actor (1939–2022)

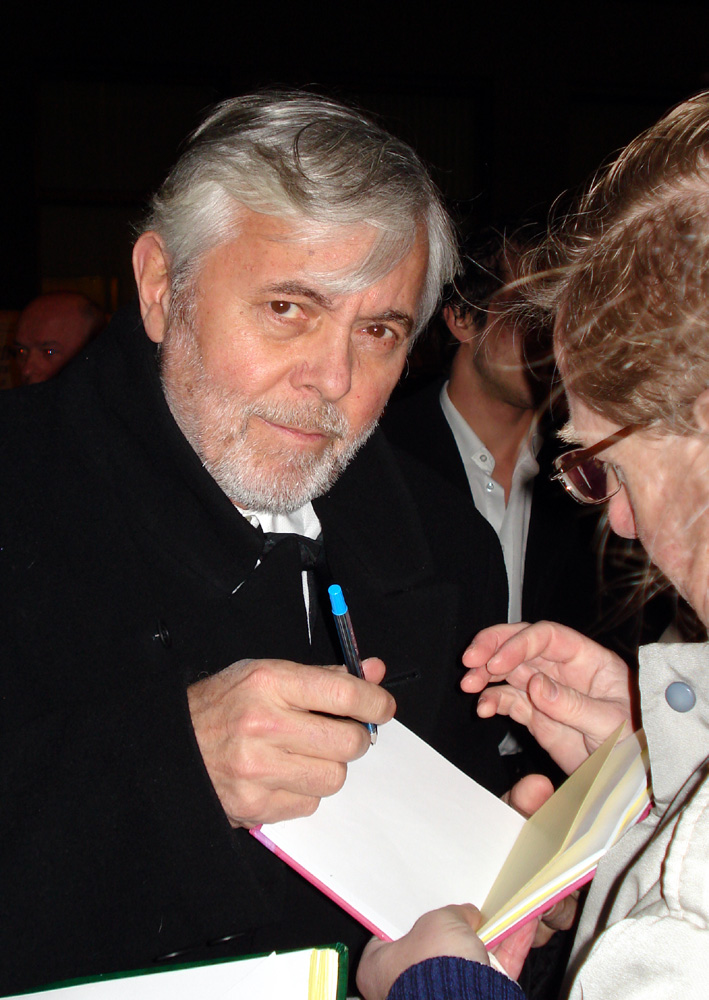
- Abrhám in 2006
- Born: 14 December 1939; Zlín, Bohemia and Moravia (now Czech Republic)
- Died: 16 May 2022 (aged 82)
- Occupation: Actor
- Years active: 1961–2017
- Spouse: Libuše Šafránková (m. 1976; died 2021)
- Children: 1

Josef Abrhám (14 December 1939 – 16 May 2022) was a Czech film and theatre actor.

== Biography ==
He originally began studying acting at the Academy of Performing Arts in Bratislava and later moved to Theatre Faculty of the Academy of Performing Arts in Prague, from where he graduated in 1962. While still a student, he played at the National Theatre, after graduation he performed for three seasons at the Vinohrady Theater. In 1965–1982 he was one of the leading actors in The Drama Club in Prague and has been noted as one of the Czech Republic's best performers. Then he briefly performed at the National Theater, but he ended his long-term commitment in August 1994 and (with two exceptions) quit theatre acting completely.

He was also a popular film and television actor. In 1962 he was given his first major film role in the film Transport from Paradise directed by director Zbyněk Brynych. This was followed by the major roles in The Cry (1963) and the role of writer Jaroslav Hašek in Velká cesta (1963). In the Czech Republic his most famous roles were seductive physician Blažej in the television series Hospital at the End of the City (1978 - 1981) and fake waiter Vrána in Waiter, Scarper! (1981).

In 1994 he won the Czech Lion Award for Best Actor in Leading Role for his role of Prokop in the film Big Beat. He was also nominated in 2006 for the Czech Lion Award for Best Supporting Actor for Beauty in Trouble and in 2011 for the Czech Lion Award for Best Actor in Leading Role for Leaving. In 2020, he received the Thalia Award for Lifetime Achievement.

Between 1968 and 1976 his partner was the actress Naďa Urbánková. He was married to actress Libuše Šafránková from 1976 until her death in 2021.

== Filmography ==
- Kde alibi nestačí (1960)
- Transport from Paradise (1962)
- Don't Take Shelter When It Rains! (1962)
- Strop (1962)
- The Cry (1963; Czech: Křik)
- Courage for Every Day (1964)
- Happy End (1966)
- Dita Saxová (1967)
- Pensión pro svobodné pány (1967)
- 322 (1969)
- Game of a Handsome Dragoon (1970)
- Valerie and Her Week of Wonders (1970)
- Ezop (1970)
- Chance (1971)
- Morgiana (1972)
- Shots in Marienbad (1973)
- Attempted Murder (1974)
- Byl jednou jeden dům (1974) TV Series
- A Girl Fit to Be Killed (1975)
- Marecek, Pass Me the Pen! (1976)
- Hospital at the End of the City (1977; Czech: Nemocnice na kraji města) TV Series
- Ball Lightning (1978; Czech: Kulový blesk)
- Upír ve věžáku (1979)
- 30 Cases of Major Zeman (1979) TV Series
- Run Waiter Run! (1980; Czech: Vrchní, prchni)
- The Hit (1980; Czech: Trhák)
- Malý pitaval z velkého města (1982) TV Series
- Jára Cimrman Lying, Sleeping (1983)
- Svatební cesta do Jiljí (1983)
- Záchvěv strachu (1983)
- Dissolved and Effused (1984)
- The C.K.Deserters (1985)
- Druhý dech (1988) TV Series
- Člověk proti zkáze (1989)
- The End of Old Times (1989)
- In the Light of the King's Love (1990)
- The Beggar's Opera (1991)
- Kafka (1991)
- St. Nicholas Is in Town (1992)
- Very Credible Stories 2 (1992)
- Big Beat (1993; Czech: Šakalí léta)
- Angelic Eyes (1994; Czech: Andělské oči)
- Halt, or I'll Miss! (1998; Czech: Stůj, nebo se netrefím!)
- Return to Paradise Lost (1999; Czech: Návrat ztraceného ráje)
- All My Loved Ones (1999; Czech: Všichni moji blízcí)
- Elixír a Halíbela (2001)
- ELFilm (2001)
- O Víle Arnoštce (2002)
- Nemocnice na kraji města po dvaceti letech (2003)
- Pánská jízda (2004)
- Konečná stanica (2004)
- Beauty in Trouble (2006; Czech: Kráska v nesnázích)
- I Served the King of England (2006; Czech: Obsluhoval jsem anglického krále)
- Leaving (2011)
- Přijde Letos Ježíšek (2013 film) (2013)
- Through the Eyes of the Photographer (2015)
- Angel of the Lord 2 (2016)
- How Poets Wait for a Miracle (2016)
