= The Land Gone Wild =

Czech historical TV series

- Genre: Adventure, Historical, Drama
- Written by: Jiří Stránský; Hynek Bočan
- Directed by: Hynek Bočan
- Starring: Martin Dejdar; Jana Hubinská; Jiří Schmitzer; Jiří Langmajer
- Narrated by: Petr Pelzer
- Music by: Zdeněk Barták
- Opening theme: Zdivočelá země
- Country of origin: Czech Republic
- Original language: Czech
- No. of seasons: 4
- No. of episodes: 45

Production
- Producers: Petr Koliha; Alice Nemanská
- Cinematography: Ivan Šlapeta
- Editor: Dalibor Lipský
- Running time: 52 minutes

Original release
- Network: Czech Television
- Release: 1997 – 2012

The Land Gone Wild (Czech: Zdivočelá země) is a Czech adventure historical television series. It was produced by Czech Television and filmed in four seasons in 1997, 2001, 2007 and 2012. Story is based on Jiří Stránský's novels Zdivočelá země and Aukce.

== Plot ==
The series takes place in Communist Czechoslovakia. Story starts in first weeks after the end of the World War II and ends in 1990. It tells story of a fictional character – former Czechoslovak pilot on Western front Antonín Madera and describes real events in post-war Czechoslovakia.

=== Season 1 ===
Lieutenant Colonel Madera, a war hero who served on Western Front, returns to his native village Svatý Štěpán in Ore Mountains borderland, where the majority of the series takes place. He wants to fulfill his dream to breed horses. The chairman of local MNV Brabenec gives him a decree of the national administrator for the estate that used to belong Germanized Kučera's family. Together with ex-policeman Martin Kanda and seven boys ("cowboys") who settled on the farm with him, he must fight German Nazis and their Czech minions, who are trying to take away the Gestapo archive hidden in the basement of the farm. Among the Nazis is Karel Kučera, the son of the family that once owned the farm where Maděra and his friends have settled. Kučera raids the farm and severely injures Maděra's fiancee Ilona before Maděra shoots him dead.

Maděra then has to deal with cattle poachers, extreme drought of 1947 and with officials from the District Agricultural Administration who have a personal interest in liquidation of Maděra's Grazing Cooperative.

After the communist coup in February 1948, the monstrosity of the communist regime is fully manifested: State security arrests Volhynian Czechs who fled the Stalinist regime from the Soviet Union to Czechoslovakia after the war while Maděra is demoted to a private. Soon afterwards he is arrested and forced by cruel torture to confess to a trumped-up charge of anti-state activity. He is sentenced to 15 years in prison for treason and espionage. At the end of the first season we follows of Maděra's first days in the concentration camp and forced eviction of Maděra's wife and children from the farm.

=== Season 2 ===
After success of the first 12 episodes, another 8 episodes were filmed four years later. Maděra is still imprisoned and forced to perform slave labor in uranium mines. He gets his strength from presence of other political prisoners, especially his comrades from war. He must also deal with targeted bullying by one of the guards, called Žabák.

In parallel with the events in the penal camp, we follow the persecution of Maděra's family. Maděra's farm is forced to transform itself into a JZD, so that its members can stay together and not be dispersed. The season ends with Maděra returning home after the partial relaxation of the totalitarian regime in the early 1960s. Former poacher Ševčík returns to the town and wants to take revenge on Maděra's family but Putna, the manager of sawmill gets him back to prison. At the end of the second season, one of the "cowboys", Cassidy, dies in accident.

=== Season 3 ===
Season 3 covers the events from Warsaw Pact invasion of Czechoslovakia to the onset of normalization in 1970. Inhabitants of Svatý Štěpán led by Putna the administrator of the sawmill rehearse a volunteer theater to which they give a strong anti-occupation undertone. Ševčík returns from prison and starts terrorizing Putna and wants to kill him. Putna is saved by Martin Kanda, who kills Ševčík and makes it look like an accident. Maděra is accused of economic crime and briefly imprisoned again.

=== Season 4 ===
It starts in 1990, followed by a retrospective return to the period of so-called normalization in the 1970s. Protagonists are located on the new farm called Lučina. They were moved there from the original Svatý Štěpán. In Svatý Štěpán, the son of deceased "cowboy" Cassidy, Vašek, who deserted from military service, appears. Martin Kanda helps him to get the blue book so that he doesn't have to serve in army. Žabák, Maděra's former supervisor in camp, becomes the commander of local State Security district department and begins to bully Maděra and his relatives again. He repeatedly by summons Maděra's relatives and friends for questioning without reason. He also takes one of "cowboys", Harry, into pre-trial detention and does not allow him to be given medication for his chronic illness which causes Harry's death. During the events of November 1989, Žabák destroys all files he kept on Maděra. The series ends with Maděra's death caused by injuries he sustains during fall from horse.

== Cast ==
- Martin Dejdar as lieutenant colonel Antonín Maděra
- Jana Hubinská as Maděra's wife Ilona
- Jiří Schmitzer as Martin Kanda
- Markéta Hrubešová as Kanda's wife Alena
- Jakub Wehrenberg as "cowboy" Jerry
- Jiří Langmajer as "cowboy" Cassidy
- Václav Chalupa as "cowboy" Pete
- Radim Kalvoda as "cowboy" Bill
- Jakub Zdeněk as "cowboy" Harry
- Zbyněk Fric as "cowboy" Smile
- Jan Teplý Jr. as "cowboy" Currly
- Aleš Spurný as "cowboy" Randy
- Oldřich Vlach as Brabenec, a chairman of local national council who later becomes government minister
- Jiří Lábus as Ondřej Putna
- David Suchařípa as Imre Dóbay
- Pavel Nový as Ševčík aka Mustache
- Petra Špalková as Jana Štětková, Jerry's wife
- Tomáš Pavelka as Dušan Vokoun
- Radek Holub as Hejl
- Hana Vagnerová as Maděra's daughter Ivana Maděrová
- Filip Cíl as Maděra's son Dan Maděra
- Filip Tomsa as Maděra's son Jíra Maděra
- Marek Němec as Radek Nerad
- Braňo Holiček and Adam Mišík as Cassidy's son Václav
- Tereza Bebarová as Jelena
- Miroslav Táborský as Žabák
- Matěj Hádek as Eda Hartman
- Lukáš Hlavica as Karel Kučera
- Adam Novák as Boy

== Episodes ==
Season	Episodes	Originally aired		Average rating	
Season	Episodes	First aired	Last aired	Millions	Share
1	12	24 February 1997	12 May 1997	2.880	36%
2	8	2 April 2001	28 May 2001		13.4%
3	12	3 November 2008	19 January 2009	0.840	9.6%
4	13	3 September 2012	26 November 2012	0.585	6.7%

== Soundtrack ==
Soundtrack was composed by Zdeněk Barták while the series title song was sung by Marta Kubišová and Karel Černoch.

== Filming locations ==
The series was mostly filmed in Úterý village which serves as Svatý Štěpán in the series. Some locals appeared in the series as background characters. Thanks to the series Úterý became popular destination for tourists and filmmakers. Other film locations included Kladruby nad Labem, Solopysky, Motol University Hospital, Ruzyně Prison, sociotherapeutic farm in Bohnice, Velká Chuchle, Příbram Mine, Hradiště Military Training Area, Tábor, Houska Castle, Hrazany, Nová Ves, Vinařice or Kunice.

== Books and films ==
The first season of the series was edited into a two-hour film released in 1997. It is conceived as a reminiscence during a visit of Maděra's wife Ilona in prison. Spin-off television film Žabák was released on 28 September 2001.

Books Zdivočelá země and Aukce by the writer and translator Jiří Stránský, on which the series was based, were published together in one volume in 1997 by the Hejkal publishing house. The author finished Zdivočelá země in 1970, but it remained in manuscript until the first edition by Lidové nakladatelství in 1991.

TV film consisting of humorous moments from shooting of the series was released in 2012 under name Zdivočelá země tentokrát nevážně (The Land Gone Wild this time not seriously). It had 15 minutes and was accompanied by commentary from Martin Dejdar.

Broadcast of final season was accompanied by release of books Zdivočelá země – Jak to bylo doopravdy (The Land Gone Wild – How it really was) and Moje cesta Zdivočelou zemí aneb S čerty nebyly žerty (My journey through the Land Gone Wild or There were no jokes with devils). Zdivočelá země – Jak to bylo doopravdy is a history guide though modern Czech history while Moje cesta Zdivočelou zemí is a book of interviews with director Jiří Stránský and actor Jakub Wehrenberg

== Reception ==
=== Popular reception ===
Series was successful with audience. It was well received by audience and started with high rating which dropped with each new season. First season was very successful with audience reaching 3 Million viewers during its first broadcast (36% share). Second season was also successful reaching 13.4% share. During its second run it suffered only mild drop in rating reaching 10.9% share which was approximately 929,000 viewers. When third season premiered its first episode was watched by over 1 million viewers but ratings dropped afterwards. Third season was watched by approximately 840,000 viewers. Last season was watched by approximately 585,000 people with first episode reaching 620,000 viewers. Last episode had over 700,000 viewers.
