= Naďa Konvalinková =

Czech actress (born 1951)

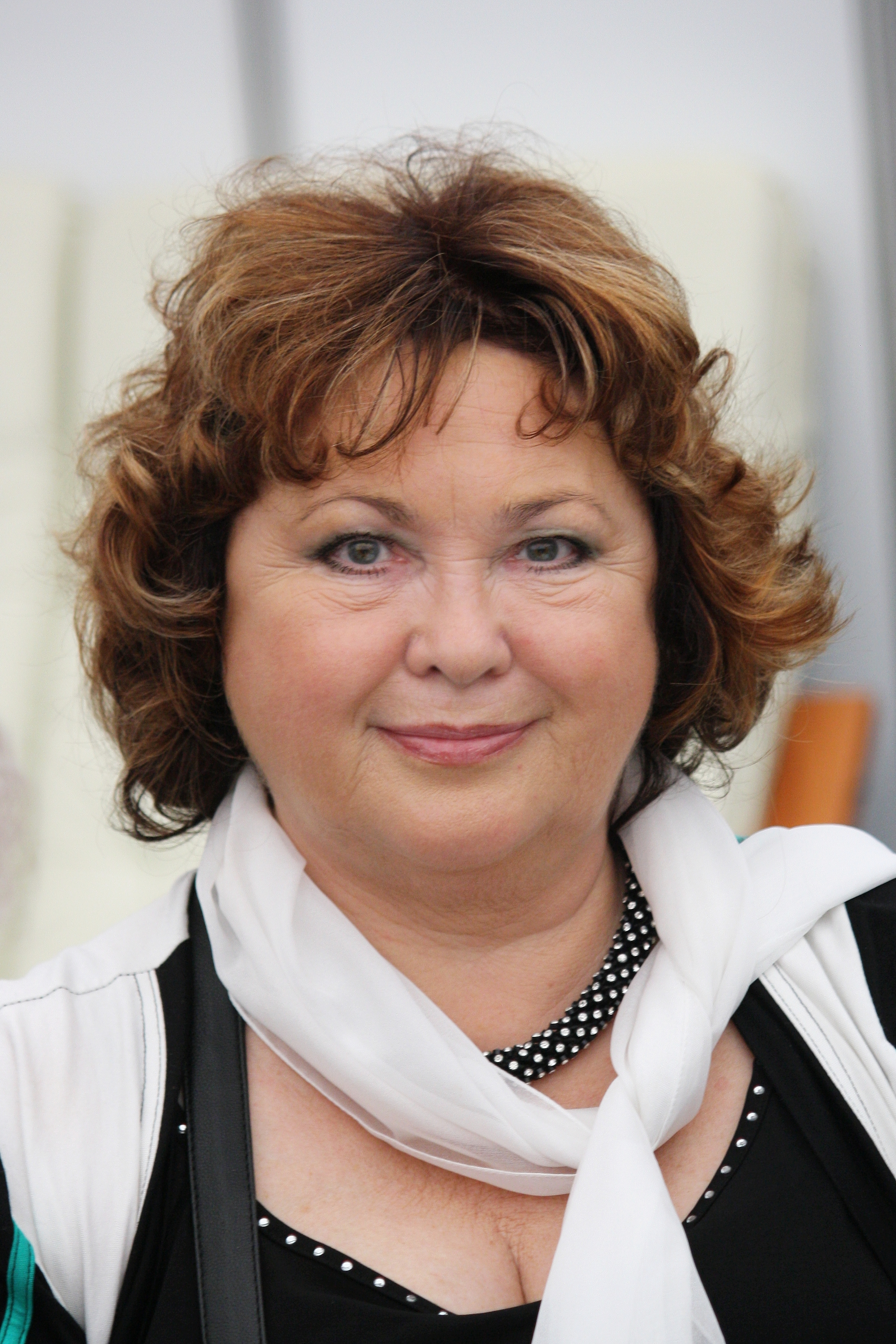
- Naďa Konvalinková in 2013
- Born: Naděžda Konvalinková; 18 April 1951; Prague, Czechoslovakia
- Occupation: Actress
- Years active: 1971–present
- Spouse: Oldřich Kaiser (1980–2005)
- Children: 1

Naďa Konvalinková (Naděžda Konvalinková; born 18 April 1951 in Prague, Czechoslovakia) is a Czech actress.

== Life and career ==
After graduating from the Faculty of Theatre of the Academy of Performing Arts in Prague, she worked in the J. K. Tyl Theatre, Plzeň, later in the Prague City Theatre (cs:Městská divadla pražská).

Of her numerous film roles, one of the best known one is in the 1977 black comedy Dinner for Adele.

During 1980–2005 she was married to actor Oldřich Kaiser, with whom she had daughter Karolina in 1983. (Karolina is a stage actress as well.)

In her later years her struggle with weight attracted media attention, and in 2011 she was the host of the TV show Jste to, co jíte ("You are what You Eat" (the Czech title is a pun, akin to "it/eat"). Before that, for 7 years, she was a co-host of the TV show about food, Pochoutky ("Delicacies").

== Filmography ==
- 2006 - I Served the King of England
- 1997 - Lotrando a Zubejda
- 1993 - Nesmrtelná teta
- 1983 - Srdečný pozdrav ze zeměkoule
- 1977 - Dinner for Adele
- 1976 - Honza málem králem
