= Snow dragon =

Snow dragon may refer to:

- Xue Long and Xue Long 2 (雪龙, literally "Snow Dragon"), Chinese polar research vessels
- Kuraokami (Okami no kami), the Japanese dragon deity of snow
- Snow Dragons, a business run by Paul Walker
- "Snow Dragons", a 2009 short story by Elizabeth Bear
- "Snow Dragons", a 1999 season 1 episode of Dragon Tales, see List of Dragon Tales episodes
- Snow Dragon Glacier Cave System, of the Sandy Glacier Caves, Oregon, United States
- Snow Dragon (film), a 2013 Czech television film
