= Libuše Šafránková =

Czech actress (1953–2021)

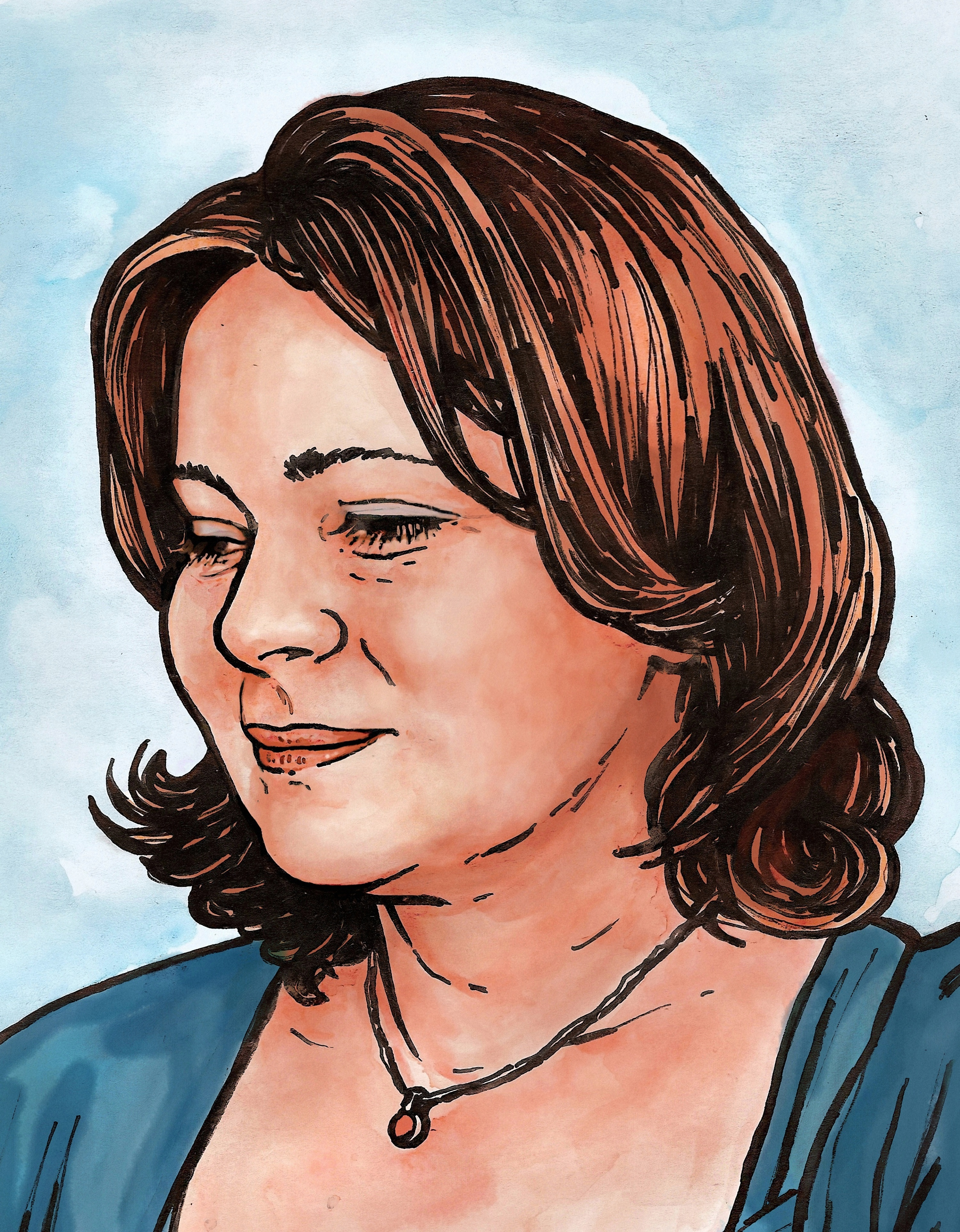
- Drawing of Šafránková
- Born: 7 June 1953; Brno, Czechoslovakia
- Died: 9 June 2021 (aged 68); Prague, Czech Republic
- Other names: Libuše Abrhámová
- Occupation: Actress
- Years active: 1971–2013
- Spouse: Josef Abrhám (m. 1976)

Signature
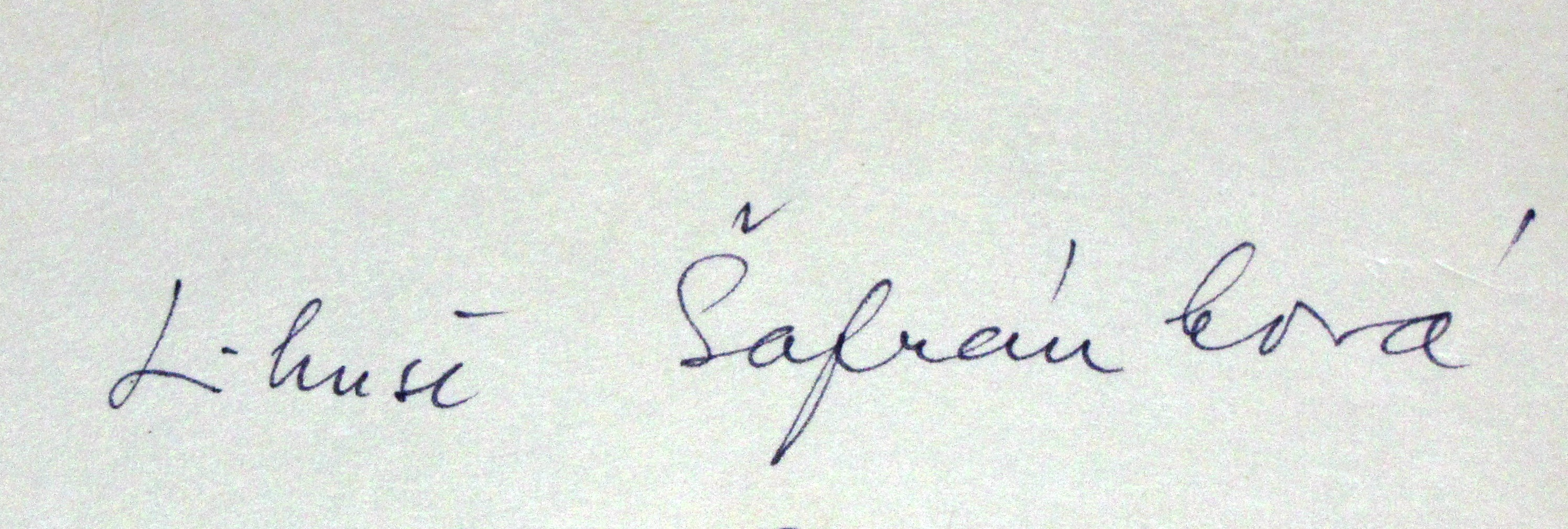

Libuše Šafránková (married Abrhámová; 7 June 1953 – 9 June 2021) was a Czech actress. She played leading roles in many Czech films and, according to audience polls, was the most popular Czech actress of the 20th century. She is best known for the title role in the 1973 fairy-tale film Three Wishes for Cinderella, which is a Christmas classic in many European countries. Her husband was actor Josef Abrhám.

== Biography ==
Libuše Šafránková was born on 7 June 1953 in a hospital in Brno, but is a native of the nearby town of Šlapanice, where her family lived. Her family was Catholic, which lasted even during the times when the Czechoslovak communist regime tried to suppress the Catholic faith. Her mother was a teacher at a clothing industry school, but she was also involved in art and amateur theatre. Her father was a musician and music teacher. He provided musical accompaniment to the local amateur theatre troupe, and on that occasion Libuše Šafránková performed on stage for the first time. She had younger sister Miroslava, who also became a film and television actress.

Šafránková started to study at the Brno Conservatory, but her teacher Marie Mrázková saw her talent for movement and convinced her to study acting. She graduated from the Janáček Academy of Performing Arts in 1971. She already got her first theatre roles in the 1970–71 season (in National Theatre Brno and Mahen Theatre). Her career as a stage actress is most closely associated with The Drama Club, where she was employed in 1972–1987, in 1989–1990 and in 1994–1995.

She had a small thin figure and her face was considered beautiful. Her breakthrough was the title role in the 1973 film Three Wishes for Cinderella, which is a Christmas classic in many countries of Europe. In the following years, she played leading roles in other successful fairy-tale films, including The Prince and the Evening Star (1978), The Salt Prince (1982) and Třetí princ (1982). Her later films include the Oscar-nominated The Elementary School (1991) and the Oscar-winning Kolya (1996).

In 1976, she married the actor Josef Abrhám. They often appeared in films together. They had a son, Josef Jr. (born 1977), who also works in the film industry.

In 2014, Šafránková had to undergo surgery to remove a benign tumor, and subsequently she retired from acting. She died on 9 June 2021, two days after her 68th birthday. She is buried in Šlapanice.

== Filmography ==
- Babička (1971)
- Three Wishes for Cinderella (1973)
- Přijela k nám pouť (1973)
- How to Drown Dr. Mracek, the Lawyer (1974)
- My Brother Has a Cute Brother (1975)
- Paleta lásky (1975)
- The Day That Shook the World (1975)
- The Little Mermaid (1976)
- Splynutí duší (1976)
- Brácha za všechny peníze (1978)
- The Prince and the Evening Star (1978)
- Run Waiter Run! (1981)
- Křtiny (1981)
- Třetí princ (1982)
- The Salt Prince (1982)
- Svatební cesta do Jiljí (1983)
- Jára Cimrman Lying, Sleeping (1983)
- The Snowdrop Festival (1983)
- My Sweet Little Village (1985)
- Zuřivý reportér (1987)
- Člověk proti zkáze (1989)
- The Elementary School (1991)
- The Beggar's Opera (1991)
- The Necklace (TV series; 1992)
- Královský život otroka (1992)
- Nesmrtelná teta (1993)
- Kolya (1996)
- Báječná léta pod psa (1997)
- All My Loved Ones (1999)
- Which Side Eden (1999)
- Elixír a Halíbela (2001)
- Četnické humoresky (2003)
- Micimutr (2011)
- The Don Juans (2013)

== Honours ==
For her role in Kolya, she received the Czech Lion Award for Best Actress in Leading Role in a film in 1996. She is often seen as the most popular Czech actress in history. In 2008, she received the prize Hvězda mého srdce (Star of My Heart) for the most popular actress of the 20th century, awarded by Czech Television and based on a viewer poll. She also won similar TýTý Award of TV Nova.

In 2015, Šafránková was awarded by the Czech Republic's Medal of Merit (First Class) for services to the state in the field of culture.
