= Marecek, Pass Me the Pen! =

1976 Czechoslovak comedy film

Marečku, podejte mi pero!
- DVD cover
- Directed by: Oldřich Lipský
- Written by: Ladislav Smoljak; Zdeněk Svěrák
- Produced by: Jaromír Lukáš
- Starring: Jiří Sovák; Iva Janžurová; Václav Lohniský
- Cinematography: Jiří Macák
- Edited by: Miroslav Hájek
- Music by: Svatopluk Havelka
- Distributed by: Národní filmový archiv
- Release date: 1976
- Running time: 93 min
- Country: Czechoslovakia
- Language: Czech

Marecek, Pass Me the Pen! (Czech: Marečku, podejte mi pero!) is a 1976 Czechoslovak comedy film directed by Oldřich Lipský. The film gained de facto cult status, many of its phrases and sentences becoming idiomatic in the Czech language, such as "Jak to chodí? – Chodí to výborně, ale neseje to." ("how does it work? – It works great, but it doesn't sow.") about a sowing machine.

== Synopsis ==
Jiří Kroupa is a man in his forties who is a team leader in a factory manufacturing agricultural machinery. He has an opportunity for promotion, but for that he needs to obtain a highschool graduation diploma. Kroupa resists vehemently, but is finally persuaded to enroll in the evening classes at a highschool where he is joined by a motley group of men and women of the same age group. Having found themselves in school again, the middle-aged Kroupa and his fellow students soon start acting like teenagers and with this and the teachers who find themselves instructing people their senior in the evenings and their children during the day, situation quickly gets out of hand.

== Cast ==
- Jiří Sovák as Jiří Kroupa
- Iva Janžurová as Týfová
- Václav Lohniský as Hujer
- Míla Myslíková as Kroupová
- Josef Kemr as Plha
- Ladislav Smoljak as Tuček
- Zdeněk Svěrák as Šlajs
- František Kovařík as Prof. Hrbolek
- Josef Abrhám as Čeněk Janda
- Jiří Schmitzer as Jiří Kroupa Jr.
