= Prachov Rocks =

Rock formation in the Czech Republic

Coordinates: 50°28′3.19″N 15°17′2.23″E

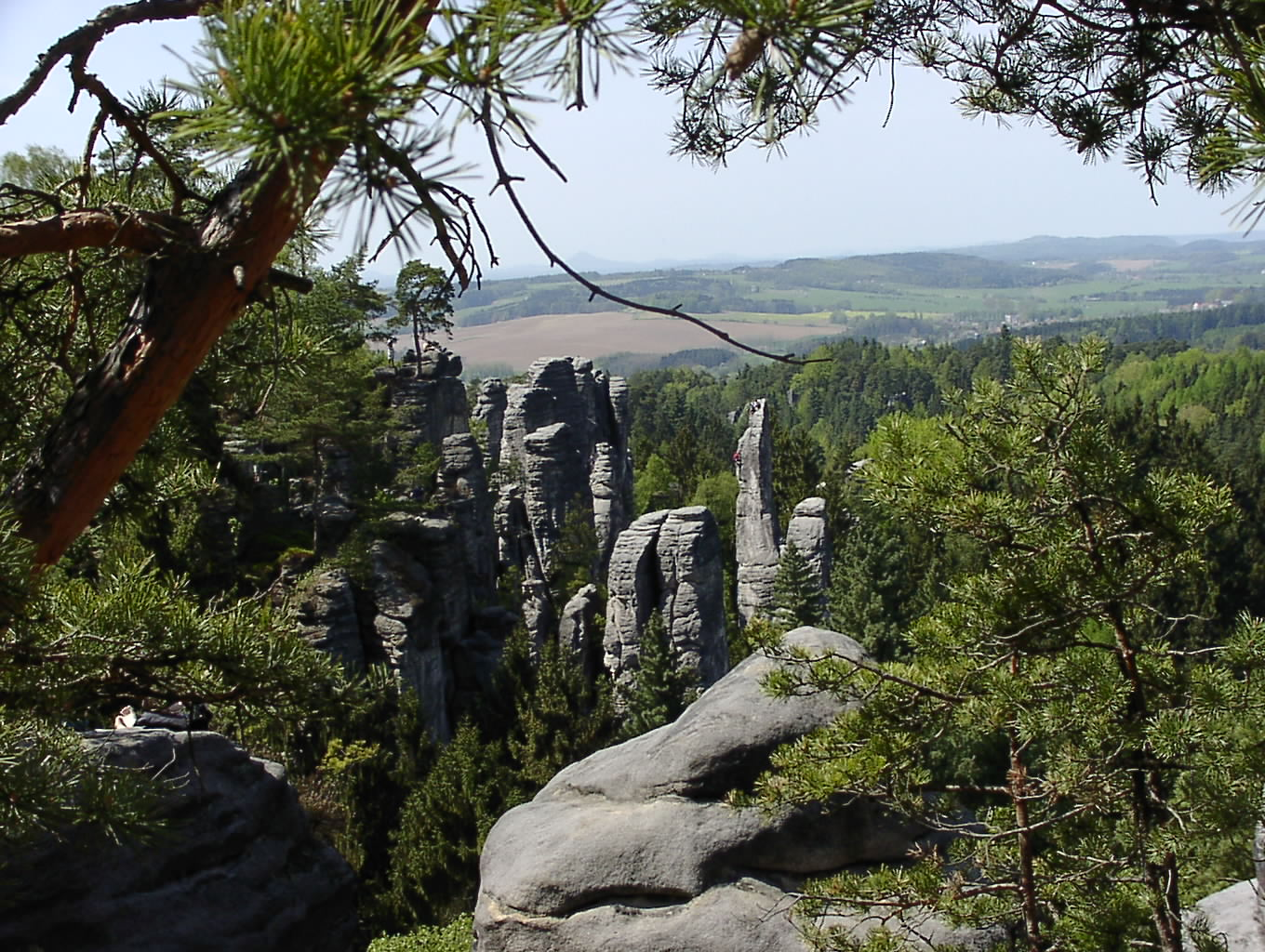
Rock towers of Prachov Rocks

The Prachov Rocks (Czech: Prachovské skály) are a rock formation in the Czech Republic approximately 5 kilometres west of Jičín. Since 1933, they have been a protected natural reserve. The region where the formations are located is called Bohemian Paradise, Český ráj in Czech.

The formations are made of sandstone, originally in the form of a plateau. Since its formation over 60 million years ago, the rock has been eroded by wind and rain into the unique forms found at the site. Several of the individual rock towers have inspired names due to their appearance, such as the Leaning Tower, Devil's Kitchen, the Monk, the Elephant, and the Eagle.

Some scenes for films and TV shows were filmed in the area, including Carnival Row, Britannia, Little Mermaid, Van Helsing, The Mists of Avalon, Hellboy, Foundation, and Nosferatu.

== Gallery ==
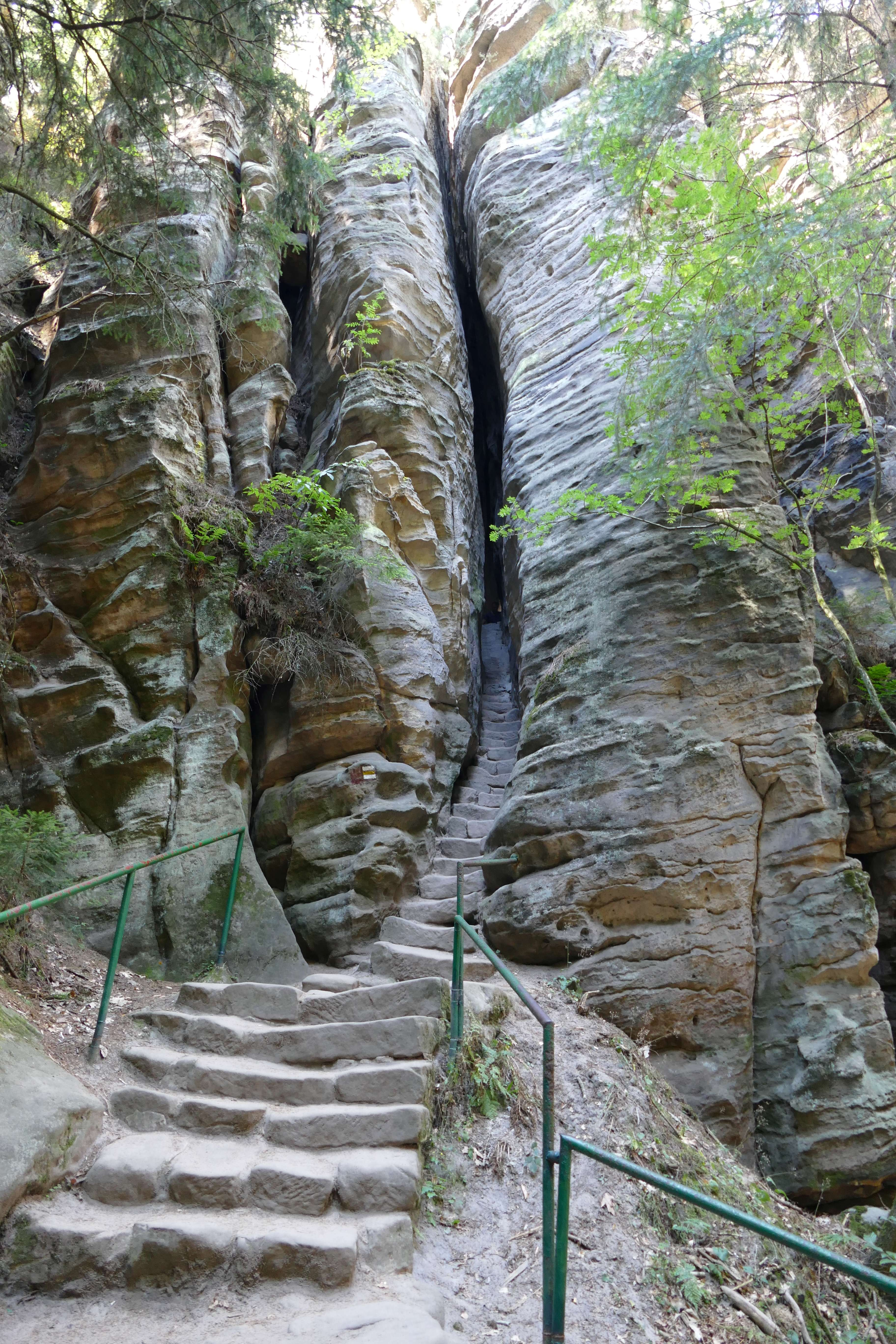
Prachov Rocks

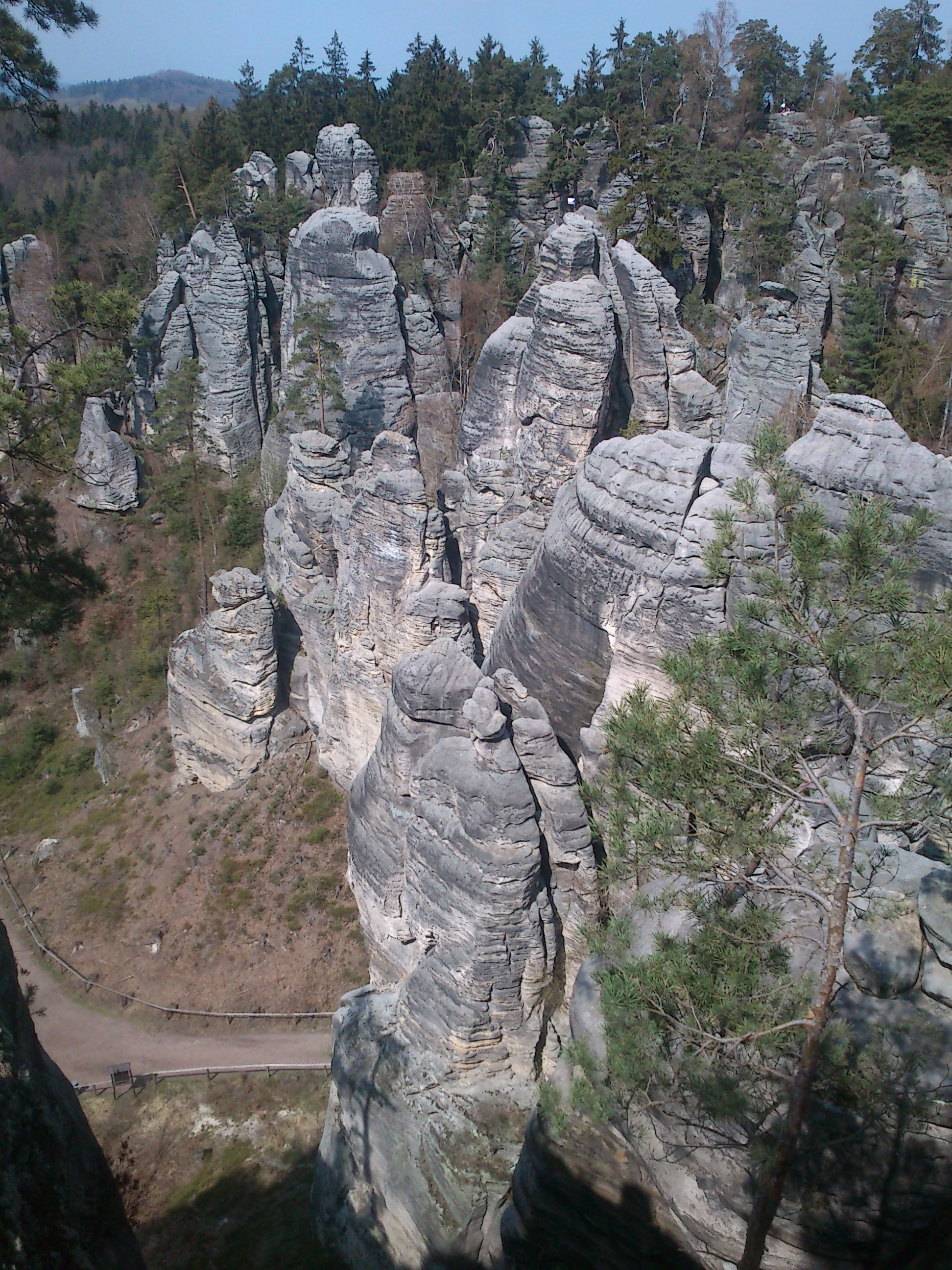
Prachov Rocks
