= The Borstal =

- Directed by: Hynek Bočan
- Screenplay by: Karel Misař; Hynek Bočan
- Starring: Ivan Vyskočil; Václav Sloup; Ivan Chocholouš; Vilém Besser
- Cinematography: Jiří Šámal
- Edited by: Zdeněk Stehlík
- Music by: Vladimír Klusák
- Production company: Filmové studio Barrandov
- Distributed by: Ústřední půjčovna filmů
- Release date: December 1, 1990
- Running time: 91 minutes
- Country: Czechoslovakia
- Language: Czech

The Borstal (Czech: Pasťák) is a Czech drama film about a teacher newly assigned to youth detention center. It was made by director Hynek Bočan in 1968, but for political reasons it remained unfinished until 1990.

== Cast ==
- Ivan Vyskočil as Teacher
- Václav Sloup as Topol
- Ivan Chocholouš as Štrobach
- Vilém Besser as Director
- Zdeněk Kryzánek as Caretaker Kostelecký
- Jiří Smutný as Caretaker Helebrant
- Vladimír Krška as Caretaker Krofta
- Jiří Krampol as Holub
