= Leaving (play) =

2007 tragicomedic play by Václav Havel

Leaving (Czech - Odcházení) is a 2007 tragicomedic play by Václav Havel.

Although Havel has had an extensive career as a playwright, Leaving was his first play in over twenty years. The play premiered at Archa Theatre in Prague on May 22, 2008. The play is composed of five acts and requires eleven men, six women, and one voice. In 2011, Havel directed a film adaptation of his play.

== Productions ==
=== Orange Tree ===
- Directed by Sam Walters. Translated by Paul Wilson.
- Vilém Rieger, ex-chancellour .... Geoffrey Beevers
- Grandmother, Rieger's mother ....
- Vlasta, Rieger's older daughter ....
- Albín, Vlasta'husband ....
- Zuzana, Rieger's younger daughter ....
- Irena, Rieger's long-time girlfriend ....
- Monika, Irena's friend ....
- Hanuš, Rieger's ex-secretary ....
- Viktor, Hanuš's ex-secretary ....
- Osvald, Rieger's handmaid ....
- Knobloch, gardener ....
- Vlasta Klein, ndeputy and vice-chairman ....
- Bea Weissenmütelhof, student of politics and mutliculture social psychology ....
- Jack, journalist ....
- Bob, photographer ....
- Officers ....
- Charwoman ....
- Removers ....
- Voice of reproductor ....

=== Národní divadlo ===
- Directed by Petr Mikulík. The play had premiere at ??? 2009 in National Theatre in Bratislava.
- Vilém Rieger, ex-chancellour .... Marián Labuda
- Grandmother, Rieger's mother ....
- Vlasta, Rieger's older daughter ....
- Albín, Vlasta'husband ....
- Zuzana, Rieger's younger daughter ....
- Irena, Rieger's long-time girlfriend ....
- Monika, Irena's friend ....
- Hanuš, Rieger's ex-secretary ....
- Viktor, Hanuš's ex-secretary ....
- Osvald, Rieger's handmaid ....
- Knobloch, gardener ....
- Vlasta Klein, ndeputy and vice-chairman .... Jozef Vajda
- Bea Weissenmütelhof, student of politics and mutliculture social psychology ....
- Jack, journalist ....
- Bob, photographer ....
- Officers ....
- Charwoman ....
- Removers ....
- Voice of reproductor ....

Leaving had its U.S. premiere at the Wilma Theater in Philadelphia, PA in May, 2010.
