= Svatební cesta do Jiljí =

- Directed by: Hynek Bočan
- Written by: Miroslav Skála
- Starring: Josef Abrhám; Libuše Šafránková
- Cinematography: Jiří Tarantík
- Edited by: Ivana Kačírková
- Music by: Petr Skoumal
- Production company: Czechoslovak Television
- Release date: 1982
- Running time: 82 minutes
- Country: Czechoslovakia
- Language: Czech

Svatební cesta do Jiljí is a Czech television romantic comedy film. It was directed by Hynek Bočan and released in 1983. It stars a real life couple Josef Abrhám and Libuše Šafránková.

== Production ==
The film was shot in summer 1982 in Krkonoše mountains.

== Cast ==
- Josef Abrhám as Tomáš Krchňák
- Libuše Šafránková as Petra
- Josef Větrovec as Tomáš's father
- Blažena Holišová as Tomáš's mother
- Ladislav Smoljak as Lost & Found Office clerk
- Zdeněk Svěrák as Train attendant
- Karel Augusta as Meadow owner
- Jiří Kodet as Radovan, recreation facility owner
- Jan Skopeček as Train dispatcher in Ústí
- Václav Vydra nejml. as Railwayman in Ústí
- Vlastimil Bedrna as Postman
