= Jiří Korn =

Czech musician and actor (born 1949)

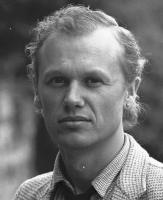
- Jiří Korn

Background information
- Born: 17 May 1949 (age 76); Prague, Czechoslovakia
- Occupations: Singer-songwriter; actor
- Years active: 1967–present
- Website: kornjiri.com

Jiří Korn (born 17 May 1949) is a Czech singer-songwriter and actor from Prague who has been active since 1967. Internationally, his single Miss Moskva received radio play in most European countries, including France, Germany, Croatia, Hungary and Norway.

== Biography ==
Jiří Korn began his music career with the rock band Rebels in its 1967 establishment. The group disbanded in 1970; one album, Šípková Růženka, was released during this period.

In the early 1970s Korn joined the band Olympic. He also became a solo artist and released his first album LP 01. His single Yvetta (1972), written by Karel Svoboda, became his first solo hit. In 1977 and 1978, Korn was placed 3rd and 2nd respectively in the Zlatý slavík music poll of popular Czechoslovakia music artists, which was frequently topped by Karel Gott. Korn performed several tracks with Helena Vondráčková, including "Tančit Prý Je Krásné" and "Slunce". In 1985, composer Michael Kocáb wrote the tracks "Karel nese asi čaj" and "Nejdřív je trénink" for Korn to record.

In 1990, Korn established Krach, a performing arts agency. He played Monsieur Thénardier in the Czech production of the musical Les Misérables in Prague's Vinohrady Theatre in 1992, a role he reprised in the Goja Music Hall in Výstaviště Prague in 2003. Korn's 2003 performance in Les Misérables awarded him the Thalia Awards category of male musical actors. In 1995, he performed in the Czech Dracula musical. Other stage productions he played include The Count of Monte Cristo (2000), Golem (2006), Carmen (2008), and Jesus Christ Superstar (2010).

Korn acted in several films and television shows, including Honza málem králem, Anděl s ďáblem v těle, 2Bobule, and Expozitura.

Korn had his own brand of perfume, ON LINE, in 2000.

== Personal life ==
Korn was married to Hana Buštíková, a member of the Kamélie musical duo. He later married actress Kateřina Kornová; they later divorced after having a son and a daughter. In October 2017 he married Renata Cieslerová, whom he met while golfing.

== Discography ==
=== Albums ===
- LP 01
- LP 02
- Zpívat jako déšť
