= The Little Mermaid (1976 Czech film) =

- Original Czech theatrical release poster
- Directed by: Karel Kachyňa
- Screenplay by: Karel Kachyňa; Ota Hofman
- Based on: "The Little Mermaid" by Hans Christian Andersen
- Starring: Miroslava Šafránková; Radovan Lukavský; Petr Svojtka; Libuše Šafránková
- Cinematography: Jaroslav Kučera
- Edited by: Miroslav Hájek
- Music by: Zdeněk Liška
- Production companies: Barrandov Studios; Mosfilm
- Distributed by: Ústřední půjčovna filmů
- Release date: November 12, 1976 (Czechoslovakia)
- Running time: 84 minutes
- Country: Czechoslovakia
- Language: Czech

The Little Mermaid (Czech: Malá mořská víla) is a 1976 Czechoslovak fantasy film directed by Karel Kachyňa based on the 1837 fairy tale "The Little Mermaid" by Hans Christian Andersen. The film won the Main Prize at 1977 Gijón International Film Festival. The plot follows Andersen's story faithfully, with the primary difference being that mermaids are not portrayed with fish tails instead of legs, but as sea nymphs who appear to have strong disdain for humanity.

== Plot ==
The little mermaid, one of the daughters of the King of the Seas, is waiting for her birthday on which she will be able to swim above the sea surface and see the world above. Her grandmother tells her stories about the surface world and warns her to never kiss a human. During the little mermaid's birthday, she sees a prince on a ship that soon sinks in a storm. Having fallen for him, she saves the prince's life, gets him safely to the shore and leaves. There, the prince is found by a young princess he falls in love with, thinking it was she who saved him.

A year later, the little mermaid rejects a sea prince's marriage proposal and trades her voice with a sea witch in order to become human and live with her prince. The witch warns her, that if the prince falls for another woman, the little mermaid will turn into sea foam. Upon a painful transformation, the mermaid is found by her prince; he welcomes her to his court and they become friends.

Longing for his daughter, the King of the Seas curses the prince's kingdom, but the little mermaid, now well-known as a miracle worker and a friend of the prince, persuades him to lift the curse and the country starts to prosper. While fond of the mermaid, the prince is thinking of the maiden he saw on the shore.

Sometime later, the prince is persuaded to meet a suitable princess from another kingdom. He reluctantly takes an entourage for a visit, with the mermaid by his side, only to discover the princess is the maiden he met on the shore. The prince and princess immediately fall in love and marry soon. The King of the Seas gives the little mermaid a dagger — if she kills the prince with it, she can turn back into a mermaid.

Loving the prince, the mermaid decides to rather sacrifice herself and throws herself into the sea while her father, grandmother, sisters, and other mermaids watch in sorrow. At dawn, the newlyweds wake up amazed to see a multitude of flowers floating on the sea.

== Cast ==
- Miroslava Šafránková as Little Mermaid
- Radovan Lukavský as King of the Seas
- Petr Svojtka as Prince of the Southern Realm
- Libuše Šafránková as Princess of Neighbour Realm
- Marie Rosůlková as Grandmother
- Milena Dvorská as Sea Witch
- Jiří Ornest as Prince's right-hand man
- Dagmar Patrasová as Little Mermaid's sister

== Production ==
Filming locations included Kladruby in the Czech Republic, another coastal town, and Prague. In addition, the film was shot at the Prachov Rocks. The prince's castle is Veltrusy Mansion. Actresses Miroslava and Libuše Šafránková were sisters.

== See also ==
- List of films about witchcraft
