= Czech Lion Award for Best Actor in Leading Role =

Czech film award

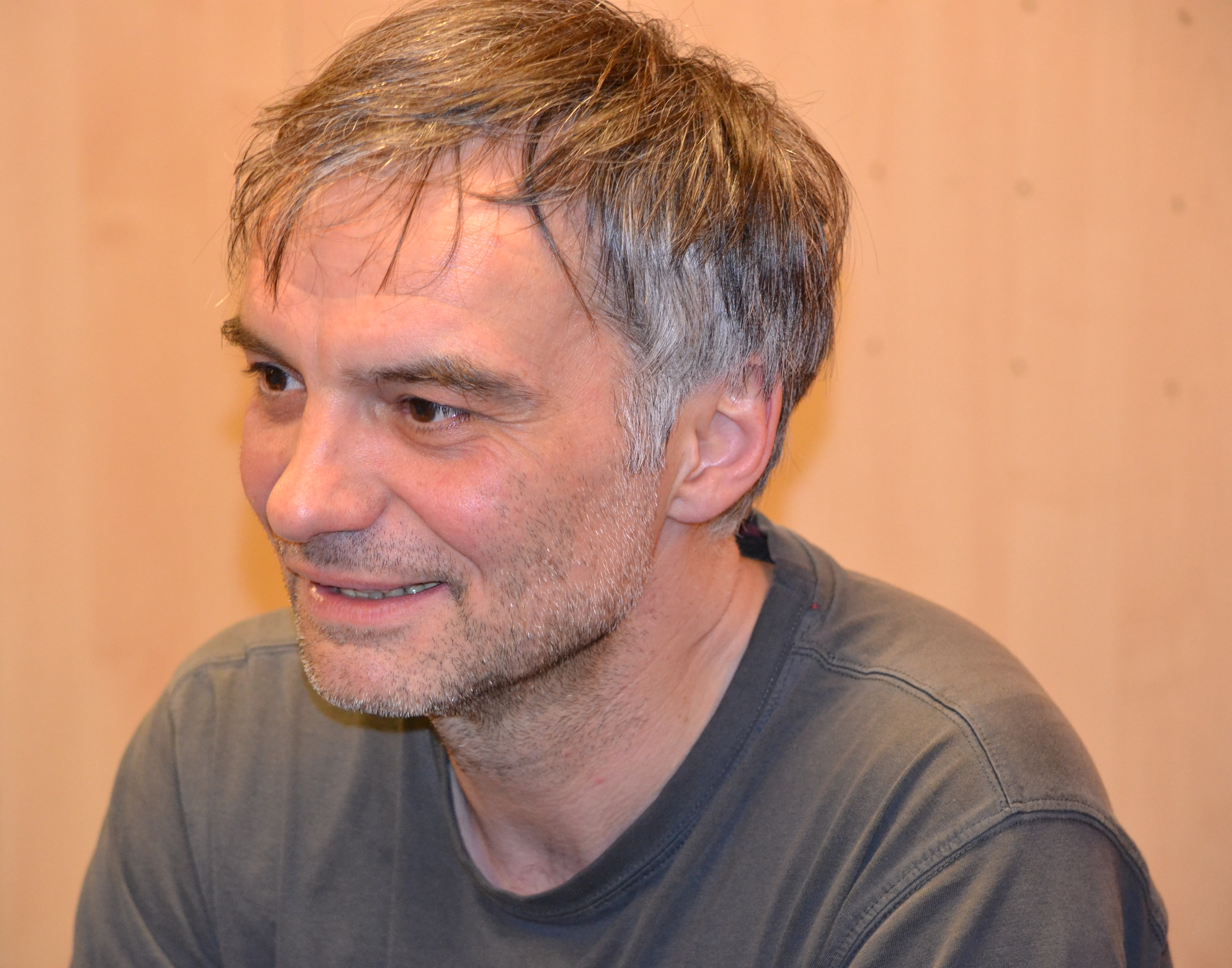
- Ivan Trojan, with the most wins
- Country: Czech Republic
- First award: 1993
- Currently held by: Idan Weiss (Franz)
- Website: https://www.filmovaakademie.cz

Czech Lion Award for Best Actor in Leading Role is an annual award given to the best male actor in a leading role of a Czech film.

== Winners ==
Year	Actor	Film title (English)	Film title (original)
1993	Josef Abrhám (1)	Big Beat	Šakalí léta
1994	Petr Čepek (1)	Faust	Lekce Faust
1995	Martin Dejdar (1)	The Dance Teacher	Učitel tance
1996	Bolek Polívka (1)	Forgotten Light	Zapomenuté světlo
1997	Jiří Schmitzer (1)	Boomerang	Bumerang
1998	Olaf Lubaszenko (1)	Sekal Has to Die	Je třeba zabít Sekala
1999	Jiří Kodet (1)	Cosy Dens	Pelíšky
2000	Bolek Polívka (2)	Divided We Fall	Musíme si pomáhat
2001	Vlastimil Brodský (1)	Autumn Spring	Babí léto
2002	Ivan Trojan (1)	Brats	Smradi
2003	Jan Budař (1)	Boredom in Brno	Nuda v Brně
2004	Iakov Kultiasov (1)	King of Thieves	Král zlodějů
2005	Pavel Liška (1)	Something Like Happiness	Štěstí
2006	Jiří Schmitzer (2)	Beauty in Trouble	Kráska v nesnázích
2007	Ivan Trojan (2)	Václav	Václav
2008	Karel Roden (1)	Guard No. 47	Hlídač č. 47
2009	Kryštof Hádek (1)	3 Seasons in Hell	3 sezóny v pekle
2010	Ondřej Malý (1)	Walking Too Fast	Pouta
2011	Vladimír Javorský (1)	Flower Buds	Poupata
2012	Ivan Trojan (3)	In the Shadow	Ve stínu
2013	Jiří Schmitzer (3)	Like Never Before	Jako nikdy
2014	Ivan Trojan (4)	Nowhere in Moravia	Díra u Hanušovic
2015	Matěj Hádek (1)	The Snake Brothers	Kobry a užovky
2016	Karel Roden (2)	A Prominent Patient	Masaryk
2017	Pavel Nový (1)	Ice Mother	Bába z ledu
2018	Karel Dobrý (1)	Hastrman	Hastrman
2019	Jiří Schmitzer (4)	Old-Timers	Staříci
2020	Ivan Trojan (5)	Charlatan	Šarlatán
2021	Václav Neužil (1)	Zátopek	Zátopek
2022	Michal Kern (1)	Arvéd	Arvéd
2023	Kryštof Hádek (2)	Volga	Volha
2024	Oldřich Kaiser (1)	The Gardener's Year	Zahradníkův rok
2025	Idan Weiss (1)	Franz	Franz

== Records ==
Items	Name	Statistics	Notes
Most wins	Ivan Trojan	5 wins	
Most nominations	Ivan Trojan	8 nominations	
Oldest winner	Vlastimil Brodský	Age 81 years, 77 days	For Autumn Spring
Youngest winner	Iakov Kultiasov	Age 13 years, 179 days	For King of Thieves
