= Parta hic =

1976 Czechoslovak film by Hynek Bočan

- Directed by: Hynek Bočan
- Written by: Václav Jelínek; Pavel Torda
- Starring: Václav Babka; Vladimír Menšík; Jan Skopeček; Josef Kemr
- Cinematography: Jiří Šámal; Michal Kulič
- Release date: 1976
- Country: Czechoslovakia
- Language: Czech

Parta hic is a 1976 Czechoslovak film starring Václav Babka, Vladimír Menšík, Jan Skopeček, and Josef Kemr.

== Cast ==
- Václav Babka as Rudla Janeček
- Vladimír Menšík as Ota Chochola
- Jan Skopeček as Mašín
- Josef Kemr as Hnízdo
