= Idan Weiss =

Actor

- Born: 1997 (age 28–29); Seesen
- Education: Internationale Akademie für Filmschauspiel
- Occupation: Actor

Idan Weiss (born 1997) is a German–Israeli actor who played the title role in a 2025 film Franz.

== Biography ==
He was born in Seesen. He spent his childhood in Coesfeld. He practiced at the Cactus Junges Theater and Arturo Theatre in Köln. He studied at the Internationale Akademie für Filmschauspiel.

The role of Franz Kafka in a 2025 film earned him an award for best actor at the 2025 Polish Film Festival, 2025 Czech Lion Award for Best Actor in Leading Role, and nominations for 2026 European Film Award for Best Actor and 2026 Polish Academy Award for Best Actor.
