= Hynek Bočan =

Czech film director (born 1938)

- Born: 29 April 1938 (age 88); Prague, Czechoslovakia
- Education: Academy of Performing Arts in Prague
- Occupations: Film director, screenwriter
- Years active: 1965–2014

Hynek Bočan (born 29 April 1938) is a Czech film director and screenwriter. His major works include the TV series The Land Gone Wild and the fairy tale film Give the Devil His Due. He has received several awards for his lifetime contribution to Czech cinematography.

== Life ==
Hynek Bočan was born on 29 April 1938 in Prague. He grew up in the Libeň district of Prague. His father, a lawyer, died when he was twelve. In 1953, he got a small role in Jiří Sequens' film Olověný chléb. This experience showed him that he did not want to be an actor, but wanted to succeed in film as a director or cinematographer. In 1956, he started to study film directing at Film and TV School of the Academy of Performing Arts in Prague. At a casting for his first film in 1965, he met his wife Jana, with whom he remained his entire life. They have a son, Jan.

== Career and appreciation ==
He started as an assistant director on movies Ninety Degrees in the Shade, Diamonds of the Night and Ikarie XB-1. His first movie was an adaptation of Milan Kundera's story Nobody Gets the Last Laugh in 1965. He became part of the so-called Czechoslovak New Wave. Because of his opinions and the themes of his films, he had problems with the authoritarian communist regime in Czechoslovakia. His movie The Borstal (1968) was banned and only released in 1990. After 1968, due to stress, he fell ill with dysphonia, which meant he could not speak and could not make films for several years.

One of Bočan's most acclaimed works was his series The Land Gone Wild (1997–2012; written together with Jiří Stránský), in which he had the opportunity to truthfully portray the dark sides of Czechoslovakia's history.

During his career, Bočan made several films and TV series for children. In 1984, he directed Give the Devil His Due, which became one of the most successful, most popular and most frequently rerun fairy tale (fantasy) films in the country. In 2024, he received the Golden Slipper award at the Zlín Film Festival for outstanding contribution to cinematography for children and youth.

In 2019, Bočan received the annual lifetime achievement award from the Association of Czech Film Clubs. In 2021, Bočan received an award for extraordinary contribution to Czech cinema from the Czech Film and Television Academy.

== Selected filmography ==
=== Films ===
- Nobody Gets the Last Laugh (1965) – won Grand Prix at International Filmfestival Mannheim-Heidelberg
- Honour and Glory (1967)
- Private Gale (1967) – won Passinetti prize at Venice Film Festival
- The Borstal (1968) – released in 1990
- Parta hic (1976)
- Svatební cesta do Jiljí (1983)
- Give the Devil His Due (1984)
- Smích se lepí na paty (1986)

=== TV series ===
- Záhada hlavolamu (1969)
- Slavné historky zbojnické (1986–1988)
- Přítelkyně z domu smutku (1992)
- The Land Gone Wild (1997–2012) – also as screenwriter

== Family ==
Bočan's nephew is Pavel Žáček (an academic, politician and journalist).
