= Veľké Dravce =

Veľké Dravce Nagydaróc
- Municipality
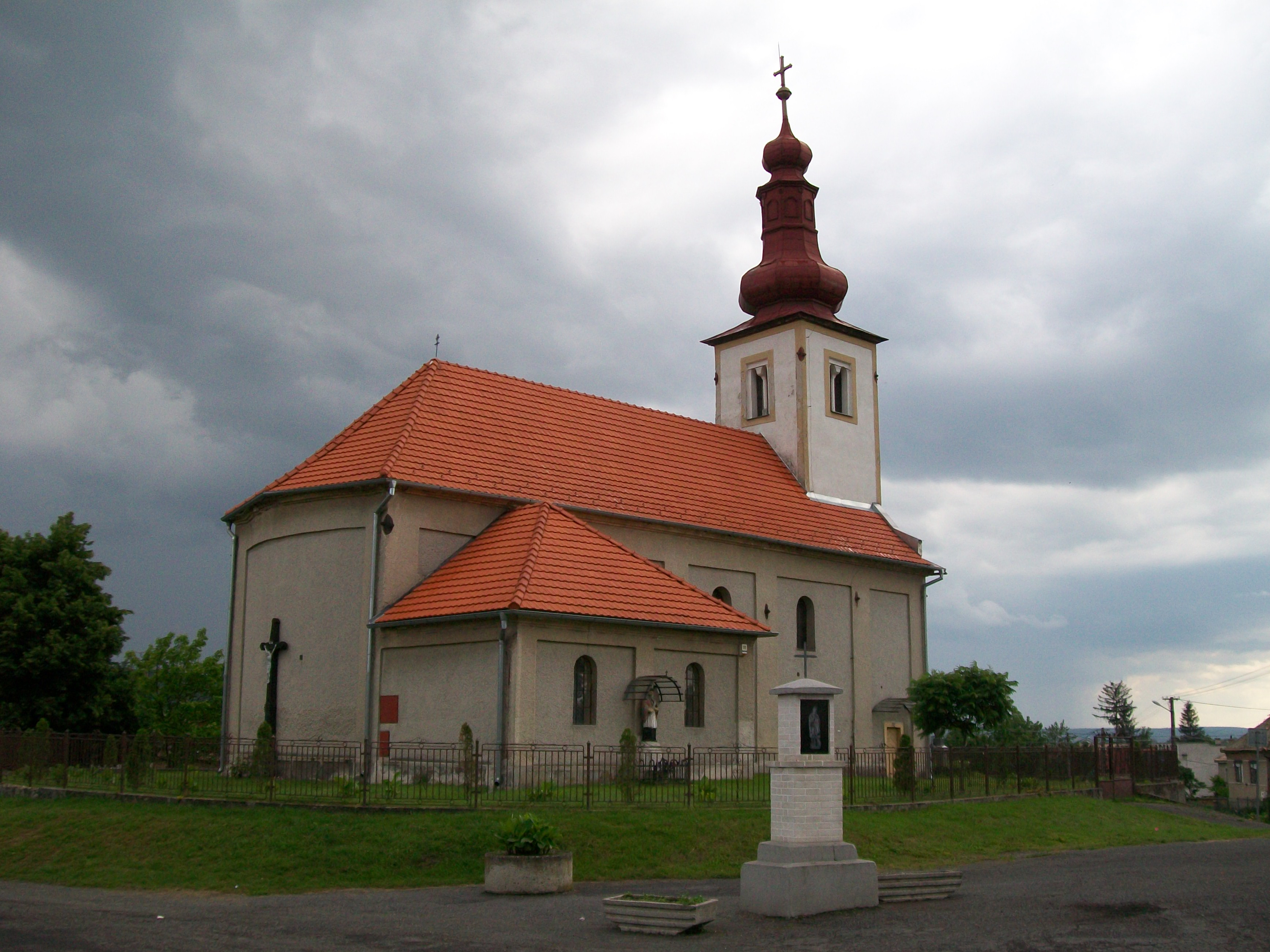
- Roman Catholic church in Veľké Dravce

- Flag

- Location of Veľké Dravce in the Banská Bystrica Region Location of Veľké Dravce in Slovakia
- Coordinates: 48.35°N 19.85°E
- Country: Slovakia
- Region: Banská Bystrica Region
- District: Lučenec District
- First mentioned: 1350

Area
  - Total: 9.53 km^{2} (3.68 sq mi)
- Elevation: 193 m (633 ft)

Population (2025)
  - Total: 655
- Time zone: UTC+1 (CET)
  - Summer (DST): UTC+2 (CEST)
- Postal code: 985 42
- Area code: +421 47
- Vehicle registration plate (until 2022): LC
- Website: www.velkedravce.sk

Veľké Dravce (Hungarian: Nagydaróc) is a village and municipality in the Lučenec District in the Banská Bystrica Region of Slovakia.

== Geography ==
The municipality lies at an altitude of 193 metres (633 ft) and covers an area of 9.53 km^{2} (3.68 sq mi) (2025).

== Population ==
Population statistic (10 years)
Year	1995	2005	2015	2025
Count	618	647	698	655
Difference		+4.69%	+7.88%	−6.16%

Population statistic
Year	2024	2025
Count	679	655
Difference		−3.53%

It has a population of 655 people (31 December 2025).

=== Ethnicity ===
Census 2021 (1+ %)
Ethnicity	Number	Fraction
Hungarian	366	52.43%
Slovak	220	31.51%
Romani	133	19.05%
Not found out	60	8.59%
Total	698	

In year 2021 was 698 people by ethnicity 366 as Hungarian, 220 as Slovak, 133 as Romani, 60 as Not found out, 3 as Czech, 3 as Other and 1 as English.

Note on population: The difference values of population numbers in the table "Population statistic" and in the sections "Ethnicity" & "Religion" is caused by the use of various statistical methods.

=== Religion ===
Census 2021 (1+ %)
Religion	Number	Fraction
Roman Catholic Church	502	71.92%
None	124	17.77%
Not found out	51	7.31%
Evangelical Church	15	2.15%
Total	698	

In year 2021 was 698 people by religion 502 from Roman Catholic Church, 124 from None, 51 from Not found out, 15 from Evangelical Church, 3 from Greek Catholic Church, 2 from Calvinist Church and 1 from Seventh-day Adventist Church.

== Notable people ==
- Květa Fialová (1929–2017), actress
