= Smích se lepí na paty =

Smích se lepí na paty is a 1986 Czechoslovak film directed by Hynek Bočan. The film starred Josef Kemr.
