= Honza =

Czech folklore character

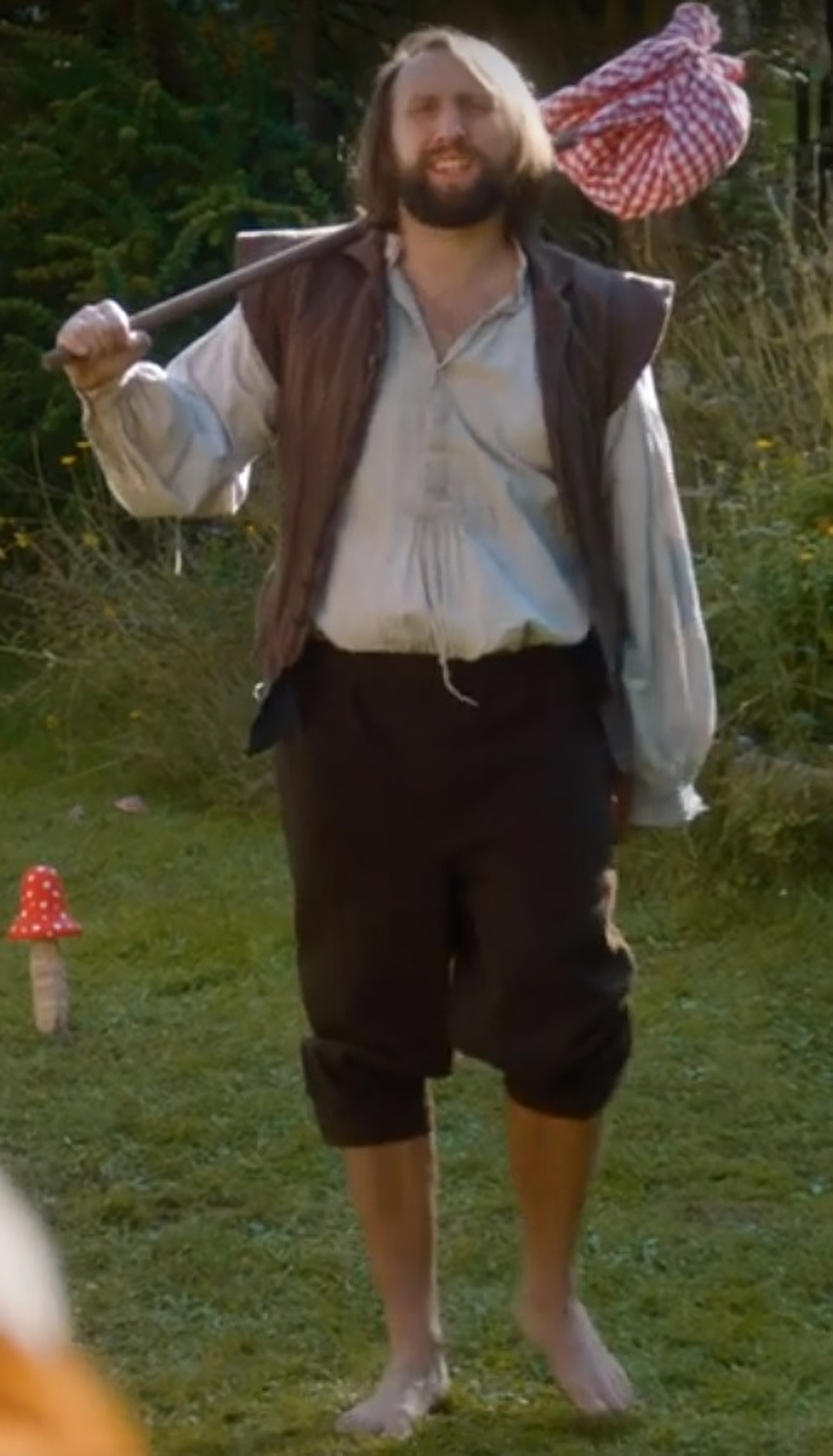
Czech "Hloupý Honza" in an advertisement of an internet company

Honza is a Czech archetypal stock character, commonly appearing in Czech folklore as a fairy tale hero. He often appears as Hloupý Honza ('stupid Honza'), Líný Honza ('lazy Honza') or Chudý Honza ('poor Honza'). He is a similar character to German Hans in Luck or Russian Ivan the Fool.

== Name ==
The name Honza is common hypocorism of the Czech name Jan (a Czech variant of the name John), so it may be translated as Johnny. It comes from German Johann(es) → Hans → Honza. Diminutives include Honzík and Honzíček.

== Portraying of Honza ==
In original uses, Líný Honza is the "lazy" and inept son of village farmers. His parents send him "to the world" to take care of himself and get experience. On his way, he meets seemingly impossible obstacles (often involving a dragon) but outsmarts them all and returns home with fame, riches and a princess as his wife.

While sometimes called Hloupý Honza ('Stupid Honza'), he is not really stupid and in more modern fairy tales he often loses other negative characteristics too.

Such figures became national personification – often suggested as mirroring the national character of Czechs (the nation had unexpectedly risen up, from low classes, struggling to establish itself as an independent entity). Comparison of "stupid" Honza with lot of "common sense" (as opposed to knowledge obtained by studying) with aristocracy portrayed by princes which are unable to overcome obstacles Honza did overcome might also refer to fact that for big part of history (most of) Czech aristocracy was separated from people and often not really Czech (but German and Austrian).

Food writer Michael Krondl mentions that often Honza is portrayed leaving home with a sack of Czech sweet pastry buchty. Krondl sees this as an assertion of Czech identity distinct from the German ruling class.

== Selected works ==
=== Literature ===
- Horák, Jiří, ed. (1940). Český Honza (in Czech). Orbis. ISBN 978-80-85606-05-8. A collection of classic fairy tales, thirteen different editions between 1940 and 2024.
- Alda, Jan (1953). Honza králem (in Czech). SNDK.
- Kopta, Josef (1957). Chytrý Honza z Čech (in Czech). SNDK.

The name of a stupid Hans is often translated as "Honza" in Czech. For example, Hans in Luck (German: Hans im Glück) is translated as Jak Honza ke štěstí přišel. The name "Hans" from "Blockhead Hans" by Hans Christian Andersen was variously translated as "Honza", Jano", or "Janek".

=== Theatre ===
- How Simple Honza Went Out into the World – puppet theatre

=== Film ===
- Honza málem králem (1976)
- Princové jsou na draka (1980)
- O chytrém Honzovi aneb Jak se Honza stal králem (1985) – Czechoslovak musical fairy-tale TV film
- Z pekla štěstí (1999)
