= Honza málem králem =

1976 Czechoslovak film

Honza málem králem is a 1976 Czechoslovak fantasy comedy film. The film's cast includes Jiří Korn, Naďa Konvalinková, and Josef Kemr.

== Cast ==
- Jiří Korn as Honza
- Naďa Konvalinková as Mařenka
- Marie Glázrová as Honza's mother
- Valerie Kaplanová as godmother with a scythe
- Josef Kemr as the royal drummer
- Zdeněk Dítě as chieftain
- František Filipovský as the King
- Jorga Kotrbová as the Princess
- Jan Skopeček as royal council member
- Slávka Budínová as peasant lady

== See also ==
- Hloupý Honza
