= Květa Fialová =

Czech actress

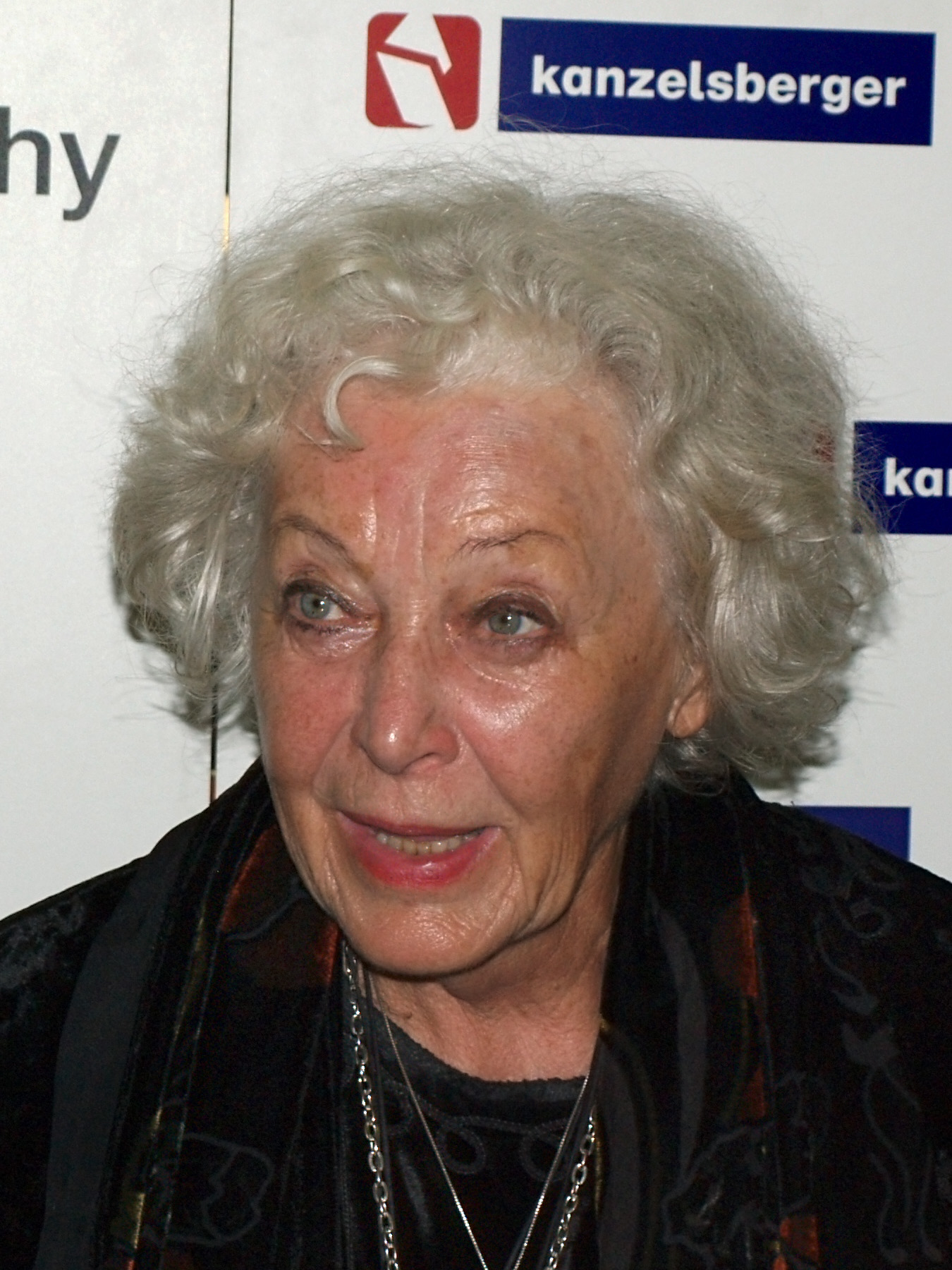
- Fialová in 2009
- Born: 1 September 1929; Veľké Dravce, Czechoslovakia (now Slovakia)
- Died: 26 September 2017 (aged 88); Prague, Czech Republic
- Occupation: Actress
- Years active: 1950–2017
- Spouse: Pavel Háša
- Children: 1

Květa Fialová (1 September 1929 – 26 September 2017) was a Czech actress. She was best known for her performance in Lemonade Joe.

== Selected filmography ==
Film
Year	Title	Role	Notes
1997	Báječná léta pod psa		
1982	I Enjoy the World With You		
1977	Dinner for Adele		
1967	The End of Agent W4C		
1966	Closely Watched Trains		
1966	The Phantom of Morrisville		
1964	Lemonade Joe		

Television
Year	Title	Role	Notes
2010	Joséphine, ange gardien	Old Régina	TV series (1 Episode : "Joséphine fait de la résistance")
