= Waiter, Scarper! =

1981 Czechoslovak comedy film

- Directed by: Ladislav Smoljak
- Written by: Zdeněk Svěrák
- Cinematography: Ivan Šlapeta
- Edited by: Jiří Brožek
- Music by: Jaroslav Uhlíř
- Production company: Filmové Studio Barrandov
- Release date: 1 January 1981
- Running time: 85 minutes
- Country: Czechoslovakia
- Language: Czech

Waiter, Scarper! (Czech: Vrchní, prchni!) is a 1981 Czechoslovak comedy film directed by Ladislav Smoljak. It is also known in English as 'Run, Waiter, Run!'.

== Plot ==
At his high school reunion, the mild-mannered Dalibor Vrána learns, to his chagrin, that some of his former classmates own villas and take international vacations. He feels dejected because he merely manages a bookstore, drives a dilapidated three-wheeled Velorex, and is chronically short on cash, in part because he owes alimony to two ex-wives, and a third wife is worried they can't pay their bills. When a drunk stranger in a restaurant mistakes Vrána for a waiter, he sees a silver lining. He starts slipping into restaurants, wearing the old tuxedo he wore to his high school reunion, and settling up the bills of diners whose real waiters have left them hanging. Soon he is able to afford a new car, though he has to hide it from the neighbors, lest they get suspicious, and drives to it in his old one. He can even afford to round up his children from their various mothers and take them on a skiing vacation. But soon the police and the press are onto him, not to mention a slew of indignant authentic waiters.

== Production ==
The idea for the movie came to the scriptwriter Zdeněk Svěrák in the early 1970s, when Svěrák slipped out of the Prague theater Malostranská Beseda, during the intermission of an opening night performance, to eat a quick dinner at U Schnellů, the pub next door. As soon as he entered the pub, he saw a forest of raised hands—impatient diners who wanted to pay and mistook him, because of his dark suit and bowtie, for one of the pub's waiters. Svěrák first offered the script to Jiří Menzel, who passed because he thought the material was too thin for a feature-length film. Svěrák hoped the actor Petr Nárožný would play the Vrána character, but Smoljak worried that Nárožný had become typecast by having played the "infuriated idiot" too many times recently, and cast Josef Abrhám instead. Smoljak revised Svěrák's script extensively, dropping, for example, a scene where Vrána escapes from a seafood restaurant because a fishing net on the ceiling drops on his pursuers, and adding a scene in which Vrána flits from one restaurant booth to another, expertly dodging the restaurant's real waiters. Smoljak insisted on filming that scene, as well as a late one, set in Karlovy Vary's Grandhotel Pupp, in a single take, because, he said, "we wanted the viewer to be able to see for himself every move, to see that coordination, whether it clicks or not. In an edit that can't be seen."

== Cast ==
- Josef Abrhám as Dalibor Vrána
- Libuše Šafránková as Helenka Vránová
- Daniela Bakerová as Mrs. Pařízková
- Zdeněk Svěrák as Pařízek
- Eliška Balzerová as Saleswoman Věra
- Jiří Kodet as Rudy Vyskočil, classmate
- Dagmar Patrasová as Manuela, Rudy's girl
- Karel Augusta as Nephew Ludva
- Zuzana Fišerová as Libuše Douchová, saleswoman
