= Pánská jízda =

Pánská jízda is a Czech comedy film directed by Martin Kotík. It was released in 2004.

== Cast ==
- Martin Dejdar
- Vladimír Škultéty
- Josef Abrhám
- Světlana Nálepková
- Petr Martinák
- Petra Špalková
