= Dinner for Adele =

1978 Czechoslovak comedy film

- Directed by: Oldřich Lipský
- Written by: Jiří Brdečka; Oldřich Lipský
- Produced by: Jaromír Lukás
- Starring: Michal Dočolomanský; Rudolf Hrušínský; Miloš Kopecký; Ladislav Pešek; Naďa Konvalinková; Květa Fialová
- Cinematography: Jaroslav Kučera
- Edited by: Miroslav Hájek
- Music by: Luboš Fišer
- Production company: Barrandov Studios
- Distributed by: Dimension Pictures
- Release date: August 1, 1978 (Czechoslovakia)
- Running time: 102 minutes
- Country: Czechoslovakia
- Language: Czech

Dinner for Adele (Czech: Adéla ještě nevečeřela) is a 1978 Czech parody comedy film directed by Oldřich Lipský. Alternative titles were Adele Hasn't Had Her Dinner Yet, Nick Carter in Prague and Adela Has Not Had Supper Yet.

The film is set at the fin de siècle. American detective Nick Carter is invited to Prague, in order to search for a missing dog. But Carter stumbles on a series of murders, as an evil baron keeps feeding victims to his carnivorous plant.

== Plot ==
It is the turn from the nineteenth to the twentieth century. Countess Thun asked the famous New York detective Nick Carter to travel to Prague, for assistance to solve the strange case of a missing dog. Carter is assisted by Prague police commissar Ledvina. Mysterious murder cases happen during the investigations, done by the malicious botanist Baron von Kratzmar and his carnivorous plant Adele.

Von Kratzmar kidnapped his victims, bound them and whenever he played a gramophone with the melody "Schlafe, mein Prinzchen" (a lullaby by Bernhard Flies but previously associated with Wolfgang Amadeus Mozart) it is the time for Adela to awaken and eat her victims for dinner.

Baron von Kratzmar considered himself a misjudged genius and wanted to take revenge on one of his former professors. He called himself "the Gardener" a notorious criminal, who Nick Carter thought had died in the swamps years ago. With the help of bizarre inventions, Ledvina and Carter succeed in catching von Kratzmar and delivering him to the legal authorities.

== Cast ==
- Michal Dočolomanský as Nick Carter
- Rudolf Hrušínský as Commissar Josef Ledvina
- Miloš Kopecký as Baron Ruppert von Kratzmar
- Ladislav Pešek as Biology professor Albín Boček
- Naďa Konvalinková as Květuška, Boček's granddaughter
- Václav Lohniský as Kratzmar's butler
- Květa Fialová as Countess Thun
- Olga Schoberová as Karin
- Martin Růžek as Police director Franz von Kaunitz
- Karel Effa as Criminal
- František Němec as Nick Carter (voice)
- Libuše Švormová as Karin (voice)
- Gene Deitch as Larry Matejka (voice)

== Production ==
The main character is a parody of the detective Nick Carter from American dime novels. Most exterior scenes were shot around Prague, including Prague main railway station, Hotel Paris, Hradčany, Letná Park and Konopiště Castle. The carnivorous plant and animated sequences were created by Czech surrealist artist Jan Švankmajer.

== Reception ==
The film was positively received by both domestic and foreign critics. Sheila Benson wrote in Los Angeles Times: "This spoof on detective Nick Carter is crammed with invention, wit of the highest order, exquisite tongue-in-cheek performances and all the art noveau([sic]?) wonders in Prague." Seattle Times favorably compared Lipský to Mel Brooks.

== Awards and nominations ==
- 1980: Saturn Award for Best Foreign Film
- 1980: Saturn Award Nomination for Best Fantasy Film

The film was also selected as the Czechoslovak entry for the Best Foreign Language Film at the 51st Academy Awards, but was not accepted as a nominee.

== See also ==
- The Mysterious Castle in the Carpathians
- List of submissions to the 51st Academy Awards for Best Foreign Language Film
- List of Czechoslovak submissions for the Academy Award for Best Foreign Language Film
