= Leaving (2011 film) =

2011 Czech drama film

- Film poster
- Czech: Odcházení
- Directed by: Václav Havel
- Screenplay by: Václav Havel
- Based on: Leaving by Václav Havel
- Produced by: Jaroslav Bouček
- Starring: Josef Abrhám
- Cinematography: Jan Malír
- Edited by: Jiří Brožek
- Music by: Michal Pavlíček
- Distributed by: Bontonfilm
- Release date: 24 March 2011
- Running time: 94 minutes
- Country: Czech Republic
- Language: Czech
- Budget: 44 million korunas

Leaving (Czech: Odcházení) is a 2011 Czech drama film written and directed by Václav Havel, based on his play of the same name, an absurdist look at the life of an ex-politician. The film received two Czech Lion awards.

== Background ==
Leaving is the only film directed by former Czech president and playwright Václav Havel. It was released in cinemas on 24 March 2011, and broadcast by Czech Television on 18 December, the day of Havel's death.

The film received nominations in all major feature film categories in the 2011 Czech Lion Awards, winning two: Best Editing (Jiří Brožek) and Best Screenplay (Havel).

It was screened within the Forum section of the 2011 Berlinale and at the second Festival du film Czech-in, Paris.

== Cast ==
- Josef Abrhám as Vilém Rieger
- Dagmar Havlová as Irena
- Vlasta Chramostová as Grandmother
- Eva Holubová as Monika
- Tatiana Vilhelmová as Vlasta
- Jan Budař as Albín
- Ivana Uhlířová as Zuzana
- Jiří Lábus as Hanus
- Roman Bloodworth as Občan Vaněk
- Oldřich Kaiser as Viktor
- Barbora Seidlová as Bea Weissenmütelhofová
- Stanislav Zindulka as Osvald
- Jiří Macháček as Jack
- Stanislav Milota as Bob
- Miroslav Krobot as Knobloch
