= Báječná léta pod psa =

1997 Czech film

Those Wonderful Years That Sucked / Báječná Léta pod Psa
- Directed by: Petr Nikolaev
- Written by: Jan Novák
- Starring: Libuše Šafránková; Ondřej Vetchý
- Music by: Milan Dvořák; Ivan Hlas
- Distributed by: Space Films
- Release date: April 3, 1997
- Running time: 109 minutes
- Country: Czech Republic
- Language: Czech

Báječná léta pod psa (English: Those Wonderful Years That Sucked) is a 1997 Czech comedy drama film adapted from the book of the same title by Michal Viewegh. Directed by Petr Nikolaev and starring Libuše Šafránková, Ondřej Vetchý and Jakub Wehrenberg, the film portrays a young family struggling through the twenty years of the Soviet occupation of Czechoslovakia.

== Plot ==
In the early 1960s Prague, Kvido is born prematurely during a Waiting for Godot performance, as if heralding his future intellectual inclinations and fondness of literature. When armies of the Warsaw Pact invade Czechoslovakia in 1968 and the Soviet occupation begins, Kvido relocates with his parents Aleš and Milena to the countryside.

Aleš, a talented economist, finds a job at a local glassworks company thanks to his college friend Žvára, but struggles with adjusting to the communist regime. Politically inactive and unsupportive of the Party, he is held in check by his superior Šperk, a vocal communist. While Aleš and Milena suffer through their situation, Kvido thrives at school as he outshines his classmates with his intelligence and befriends his classmate Jaruška. Ultimately, it is Kvido who improves the family's situation, earning them a new house by being part of Šperk's wife's pro-regime oratory club.

Years later, the family is well-settled and have a second son named Paco. Kvido is an aspiring author and in love with Jaruška who reciprocates his feelings, while Aleš is at the height of his career. All changes, however, when the family is compromised for socializing with Milena's old friend, a dissident. Aleš is demoted and interrogated by the secret police which leaves him traumatized and paranoid. His family's breakdown prompts Kvido to name his autobiographic debut novel Those Wonderful Years That Sucked.

After unsuccessful attempts at making him feel better, the desperate Milena persuades Kvido and Jaruška to have a baby, hoping that a grandchild would help Aleš overcome his depression. The couple conceive, but Aleš is apathetic to the news, partially recovering only years later with the fall of communism. In 1990, Šperk visits the family, being as enthusiastic about the new regime as he used to be about the old one, signifying that not that much has changed, after all.

== Cast list ==
- Libuše Šafránková as Milena Vítková, Kvido's mother
- Ondřej Vetchý as Ing. Aleš Vítek, Kvido's father
- Jakub Wehrenberg as Kvido Vítek
  - Jan Zahálka as young Kvido
- Jitka Ježková as Jaruška
  - Klára Botková as young Jaruška
- Vladimír Javorský as Viktor Šperk, Aleš's boss
- Vilma Cibulková as Nina Šperková
- Miriam Kantorková as grandmother Věra
- Vladimír Dlouhý as Ing. Jiří Žvára, Aleš and Milena's friend
- Květa Fialová as grandmother Líba
- Stanislav Zindulka as grandfather Josef
- Otakar Brousek Sr. as grandfather Jiří
- Viktor Preiss as Milan, a playwright and dissident
- Jiří Schmitzer as Dr. Liehr
- Alice Bendová as Miryana
- Miloň Čepelka as gateman
