= Jiří Stránský =

Czech author, translator, political prisoner and human rights advocate

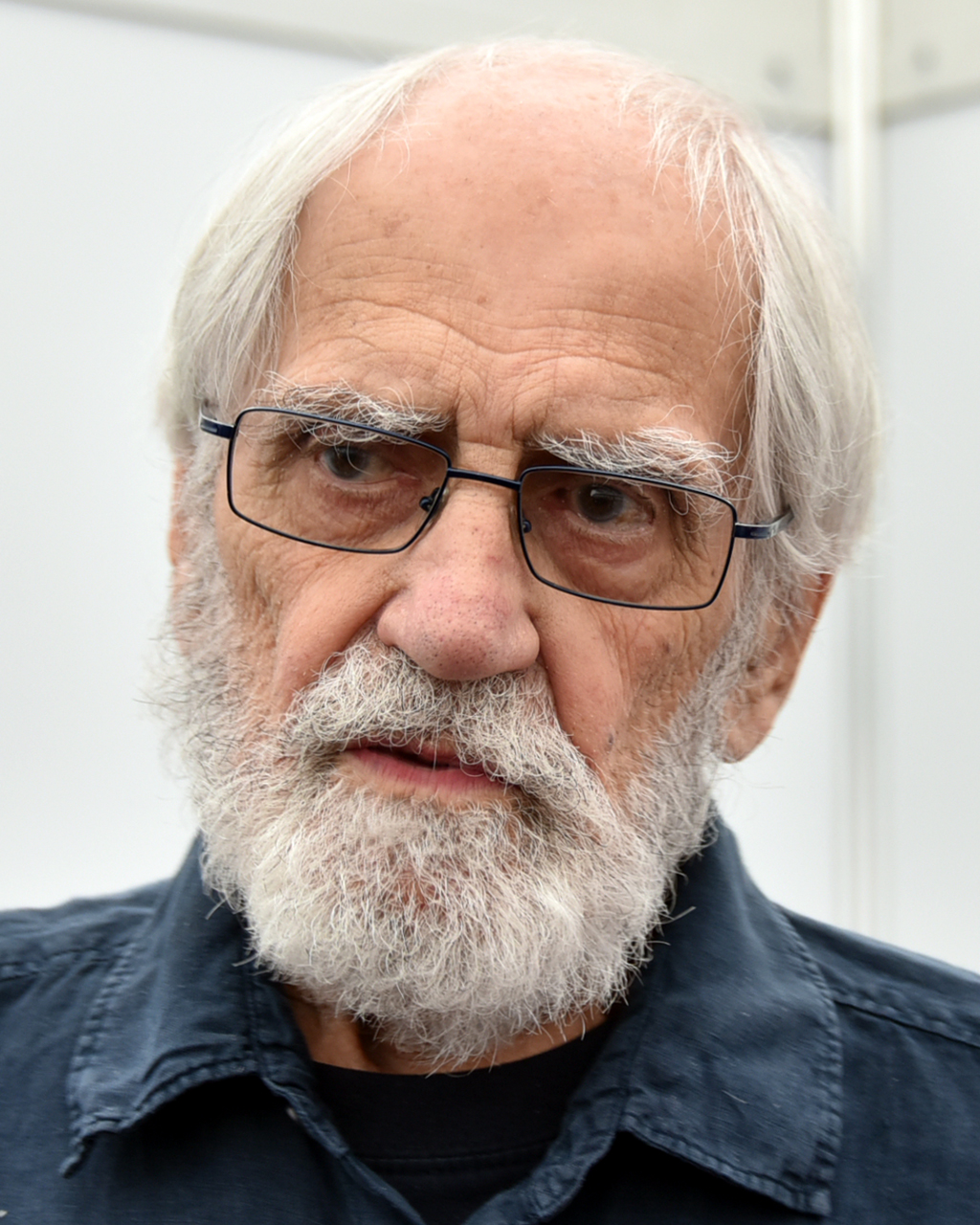
- Stránský in 2019
- Born: 12 August 1931; Prague, Czechoslovakia
- Died: 29 May 2019 (aged 87); Prague, Czech Republic
- Occupations: author, playwright, screenwriter, translator
- Children: 2
- Relatives: Antonie Formanová (granddaughter)
- Writing career
- Notable works: Štěstí, (Happiness); Zdivočelá země, (The land gone wild); Přelet, (Flight); Perlorodky, (Pearls); Tóny, (Tones); Balada o pilotovi,(Ballad of the pilot)

Jiří Stránský (12 August 1931 – 29 May 2019) was a Czech author, playwright, translator, screenwriter and human rights advocate. He was twice a political prisoner of the communist regime of Czechoslovakia. He was the grandson of politician Jan Malypetr.

In 1953, he was arrested by the communists and sentenced to eight years of forced labour for "treason". He was released in 1960. In 1974, he was arrested again, charged with embezzlement and sentenced to another 3 to 5 years, but was released after one and a half. While imprisoned, he met with several Catholic writers, an experience that encouraged him to become a writer.

After the fall of the communist regime, he was an author and head of the international section of the Czech Literary Fund. In 1992, he was elected President of the Czech section of International PEN. He was chairman of the council of the National Library from 1995 to 1998.

He was a founding signatory of the Prague Declaration on European Conscience and Communism.

His signature also appears on Charter 77.

== Notable figure in the Czech Republic ==
Stránský is a notable figure to the Czech public for his significant resistance and opposition to totalitarianism and injustices before 1989. Being creative as well, he has produced as a writer, screenwriter, playwright, poet and translator. Stránský has other achievements as a scout, as well.

His stature in Czech society also has an origin in some of his family members, who were also prominent figures in the Czech lands. Stránský is the maternal grandson of Jan Malypetr, a once prominent Czech politician; the son of Karel Stránský, a lawyer; and also a relative of his father's cousin and the founder of Czech Scouts, Antonín Benjamin Svojsík, who has roots in the early years and forms of scouting.

His immediate family—in particular, his father—also acted in resistance to the injustices of communism, which paired with his own, barred him from finishing school. Thus, in his life leading up to 1989 and the fall of Communism in Europe, he was falsely accused of vague criminal acts against the Communist state of Czechoslovakia (now the Czech Republic), and subsequently imprisoned for various lengths of time. Even so, following the fall of communism in 1989, Stránský found success and received many notable awards for his work as an artist and for his steadfast resistance to totalitarianism. Many of his popular works were also duly published widely made into film, television shows, and radio plays.

== Early life ==
Like most Czech youth in Czechoslovakia, scouting and sokol made up a sizable amount of his life, like school. Since his ancestor was a notable founder of scouting in the Czech region, bringing the popular British form over, and his father played a notable role in their community's sokol as a mayor, Jiří valued his time spent being a part of these groups, citing the training he received in each as important skills in survival. While in the scouts, he was given the name, Jira. Jiří Stránský was active in other areas as well. At the pre-teen age of fourteen, Jiří banded with the May Uprising of 1945 to resist the current communist regime and was awarded the Distinction of Military Merit of the 2nd degree for being the youngest to engage in the coordinated defiance against the government.

Whether attributed to his combatant actions or his family's, or rather their collective blatant refusal to align themselves with the popular ideologies of the government at the time, he was not permitted to finish school. As a result, he resorted to working various jobs. Then, at the age of twenty-one, he was falsely accused of espionage and eventually imprisoned.

== First imprisonment: inspiration to become a writer ==
Jiří Stránský's first imprisonment was the result of a false accusation made by a friend. His friend was pressured into giving information on people that he knew, so he fabricated an elaborate story about Jiří, claiming he gained skills as a spy in order to relay information that can be detrimental to the current ruling government. At the time, Jiří was twenty-one years old, which qualified as a factor to halve the usual 16-year sentence to 8 years. His sentence was for doing forced-labour mining for uranium. Looking back on his time doing forced-labour, he would satirically claim that of all the forced-labour to which one can be sentenced, work at the uranium mines is not the most ideal. Nevertheless, it was during the long days of hard-labour that he found inspiration to become a writer. All that he saw, all that he witnessed and all those whom he encountered instilled in him the desire to record all the details as stories. Fortunately, he also had the privilege of spending time with some prominent catholic writers like, František Křelina, Josef Knap and Jan Zahradníček. Despite their lack of support for his interest in writing, for they themselves were in forced labour because of their writing, he still continued to write in secret. With the help of one of the civilians he worked with in the uranium mine, he managed to compose short pieces that were secretively delivered off-site. Following his release, he used some of the notes he made while serving his sentence and compiled "Happiness," which will not be published officially until 1968.

During his first sentence under the crime of espionage, Jiří is to travel to many labour camps and prisons. Beginning in the Pankrák district, he was then sent to the Ilava prison, camp Vykmanov, the Svatopluk u Horní Slavoka camp and the Vojna camp. During his time in the latter, he joined a hunger strike and was deported once more. Jiří was given amnesty and released from imprisonment in 1960.

Until 1974 when he will again find himself to be sentenced and imprisoned once more, he spent his time working as a skilled labourer, living in many countries, and starting a family. Jiří married Jitka, who he had been seeing before his first imprisonment, and they had two children, a daughter and son, Klárka and Martin, respectively. In jest, Jiří remarks how he contributed to the construction of the stadium in Podolí, which, is still standing. Jiří does manage to get some of his short stories published. One story, "Vašek," got him noticed by film director Martin Frič, to whom he will work with as an assistant director. Not long after, he will also work as the assistant director to Hynek Bočan. Although he is barred from maintaining a job with permanence, he manages to work at a gas station pumping gas. The gas station is located close to a film studio, and many of the customers he served were working there. In this way, Jiří unofficially worked as an outside consultant for the studio by communicating with those he interacted with at the gas station, later referred to as the "Intellectual Gas Station".

== Second imprisonment: intellectual gas station and a shorter sentence ==
Stránský cites his second imprisonment as the result of his activities at the Intellectual Gas Station being discovered. His arrest is the result of a bogus accusation of embezzlement. He is not sentenced until the following year, where he is to serve only two years.

== Education: "Doctor of Prison Sciences" ==
After 1989, as he became a popular writer, playwright, screenwriter, poet and an artistic figure of merit and admiration, Stránský found himself regularly addressed as "Dr. Jiří Stránský" even though he never received a degree or completed school. Thus, at one of the Franz Kafka Society events he attended as a host (of which he is a jury member), he decided to correct this persistent mistake, and created the honorary degree of "Doctor of Prison Sciences," or a PhD in Prison Sciences. He had reasoned that he is a certified expert in prisons after spending many years in some. As he explained, "Now, there is the intellectual elite of the nations here in these camps and prisons. And, really, this [his time there at prison] university lasted for over seven years. I listened to countless lectures on philosophy, aesthetics and other subjects." Indeed, he made use of his time in prison by taking it all in at the wisdom of one of his colleagues in prison, Honza Zahradníček. Stránský recalls a time when he and other prisoners met to hear an art historian, who was also a prisoner (probably named Bonifalerský), discuss "aesthetics," mentioning the works of Velasquez and other impressionists and artists from other movements. In order to share the material, Stránský and the other prisoners of this secret art history course "arranged […] with one of the civilian workers […] to buy […] postcards with reproduced paintings from the National Gallery [National Gallery Prague, Nárdoní Galerie Praha] {pages in each respective language} collection."

== Quote ==
"Byl jsem vychováván tak, že jedním z našich hesel bylo: Tu radost jim neuděláme. Přeloženo do normální češtiny: Nikomu, kdo nás ponižuje, neuděláme radost, že mu dáme najevo, že jsme ponižováni. Jiní říkají vznešeně: Neohnu se, nekleknu. Nám stačilo říct: Tu radost jim neuděláme."

Translated, "I was raised so that one of our slogans was: We will not make them happy. Translated into normal language: We will not please anyone who humiliates us by showing him that we are humiliated. Others say nobly, 'I won't bend, I don't kneel'. We just had to say, 'We will not make them happy'."

== Works ==
- Za plotem, (Behind the Fence), written in prison (1953–1960), published 1999
- Štěstí, (Happiness), 1969, most copies were confiscated and destroyed by the communists, it was released in 1990
- Zdivočelá země, (The land gone wild), 1970, made into a film in 1997
- Aukce, (Auction), 1997, sequel Zdivočelé země, 1989
- Přelet, (Flight), 2001
- Povídačky pro moje slunce, (Stories for my sun), 2002
- Tichá pošta, (Silent post), 2002
- Povídačky pro Klárku, (Stories for Klara [his daughter]), 2004
- Perlorodky, (Pearls), 2005
- Srdcerváč, 2005
- Stařec a smrt, 2007
- Oblouk, 2009
- Tóny, (Tones) 2012 – novela
- Balada o pilotovi, (Ballad of the pilot) 2013 – novela telling the story of Karel Balík, father of Stránský's wife
- Štěstí napodruhé, 2019

=== Short stories ===
- "Náhoda," 1976
- "Vánoce," ("Christmas"), 1976
- "Přelet," ("Flight"), 1976
- "Dopisy bez hranic," (Lasica and Stránský), 2010

=== Plays ===
- Latríny, 1972
- Labyrint, 1972
- Claudius a Gertruda, which premiered on 7 December 2007, theater association Kašpar, in theater in Celetné, directed by Jakub Špalek

=== Films based on his work ===
- Bumerang, 1996, directed by Hynek Bočan
- Zdivočelá země, 1997
- Zdivočelá země, series 1997–2001, directed by Hynek Bočan
- Uniforma, 2001, directed by Hynek Bočan
- Žabák, (Frog), 2001, directed by Hynek Bočan
- Kousek nebe, (A piece of heaven), 2005, directed by Petr Nikolaev
- Balada o pilotovi, (Ballad of the pilot, festival title A Pilot Tale), 2018, directed by Ján Sebechlebský

== Awards ==
- 2015: Knight of Czech Culture - Award and Title of the Ministry of Culture of the Czech Republic (presented by Minister of Culture Daniel Herman)
- 2015: Arnošt Lustig Award
- Medal of Merit (Czech Republic)
- Artis Bohemiae Amicis Medal
- Karel Čapek Prize
- 1 June Award
- Order of the Silver Wolf (2011)
- Memory of Nation Award (2013)
