= Vendeta =

2011 Czech thriller film

- Directed by: Miroslav Vondruš
- Written by: Miroslav Ondruš
- Produced by: Vratislav Šajer
- Starring: Ondřej Vetchý; Oldřich Kaiser
- Cinematography: Martin Štrba
- Edited by: Michal Lánsky
- Music by: Petr Ostruchov
- Distributed by: Bontonfilm
- Release date: November 24, 2011
- Running time: 90 minutes
- Country: Czech Republic
- Language: Czech

Vendeta is a 2011 Czech thriller film directed by Miroslav Ondruš.

== Plot ==
The film tells story of a man whose daughter was raped and murdered by her classmates. He decides to take revenge. This leads to his confrontation with another man who disagree with his deeds.

== Cast ==
- Ondřej Vetchý - Pochman - The main protagonist. His daughter Hanka was raped and murdered by three boys. He wants to revenge and decides to kill them.
- Oldřich Kaiser - Mazura - He acts as a main antagonist toward the end of film. He is a forester who finds out about Pochman's revenge. He disagree with it and so he tries to protect boys.
- Igor Chmela - Chladima - A cop who is bribed by Pochman.
- Marek Taclík - Novotný - Another cop. He is also bribed by Pochman. He is not sure that it's reasonable to help Pochman.
- Lucie Šteflová - Hanka - Pochman's daughter. She was murdered by her classmates.
- Ondřej Havel - Tomáš - A leader of boys who killed Hanka. He is proud of it.
- Václav Vostárek - David - A boy who participated in rape and murder of Hanka. He is the only who feels remorse for what he did.
- Daniel Novák - Honza - The third boy who participated.

== Reception ==
Reviews:

- Kamil Fila, Aktuálně.cz, November 1, 2011 40%
- Tereza Spáčilová, iDNES.cz, November 22, 2011 70%
- Karel Ryška, MovieZone.cz, November 23, 2011
- Alena Prokopová, Alenčin blog, November 21, 2011
- František Fuka, FFFilm, November 18, 2011 70%
