= Snow Dragon (film) =

- Directed by: Eugen Sokolovský
- Starring: Petr Lněnička, Petra Tenorová
- Country of origin: Czech Republic
- Original language: Czech

Production
- Running time: 89 Minutes
- Production company: Czech Television

Original release
- Release: 2013

Snow Dragon (Czech: Sněžný drak) is a 2013 Czech television film directed by Eugen Sokolovský. It premiered on 25 December 2013. It was viewed by 700,000 people. It is a fantasy, action film.

== Plot ==
The film tells the story of Princess Laura and Prince Jan. It was prophesied that Jan will make Laura unhappy and Queen Vilma cast a curse upon him. Jan turns into a Snow dragon every night. Vilma then leaves Laura and her husband Valentin. When Laura grows up and has to choose her husband she meets Jan and they fall in love. King disagrees and wants to prevent it. They escape and the prince finds out about the curse. They set out to remove it from him. It is revealed during the journey that Jan is a coward and is unable to help Laura when she is in danger. It eventually leads to conflict between them and Laura returns home. She is set to marry evil Dacián but Jan finds the courage to face him and Dacián turns into a black dragon. Jan fights him in his Snow dragon form and wins. The curse is removed and Jan marries Laura.

== Cast ==
- Petr Lněnička (date of birth: 20.07.1979, place of birth: Litomysl, Czechoslovakia) as Prince Jan
- Petra Tenorová (date of birth: 20.02.1989, place of birth: Praha, Czechoslovakia) as Princess Laura
- Martin Mysicka as Prince Dacián
- Saša Rašilov as King Valentin
- Jitka Cvancarová as Queen Vilma
- Arnost Goldflam as Hubert

== Reception ==
The film has won an award at Zlín Film Festival for children.
