= Oldřich Kaiser =

Czech actor (born 1955)

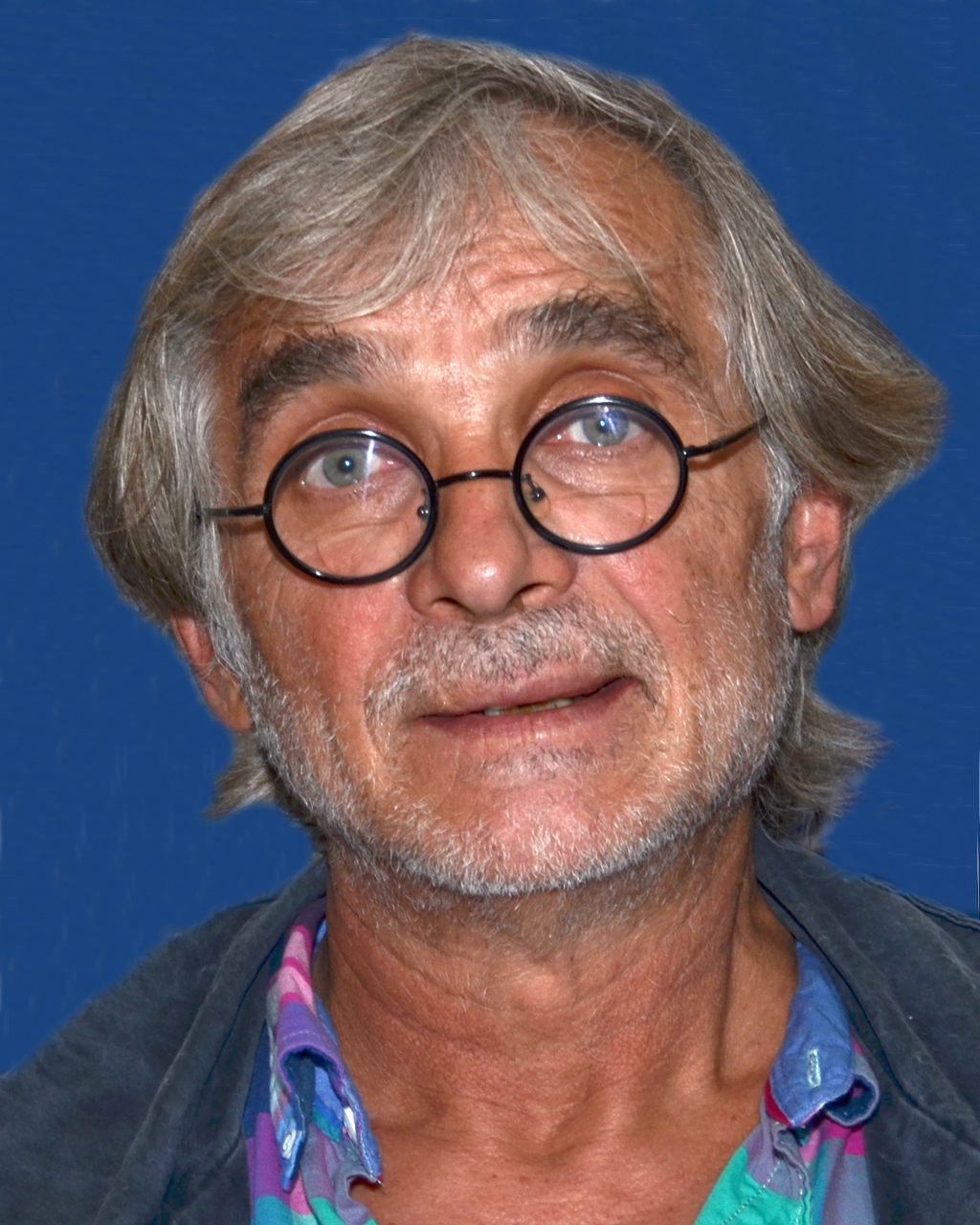
- Kaiser in 2017
- Born: 16 May 1955 (age 71); Liberec, Czechoslovakia
- Education: Academy of Performing Arts in Prague
- Occupation: Actor
- Years active: 1971–present
- Spouse: Naďa Konvalinková (1980–2005)
- Children: Karolína Kaiserová
- Awards: Czech Lion

Signature
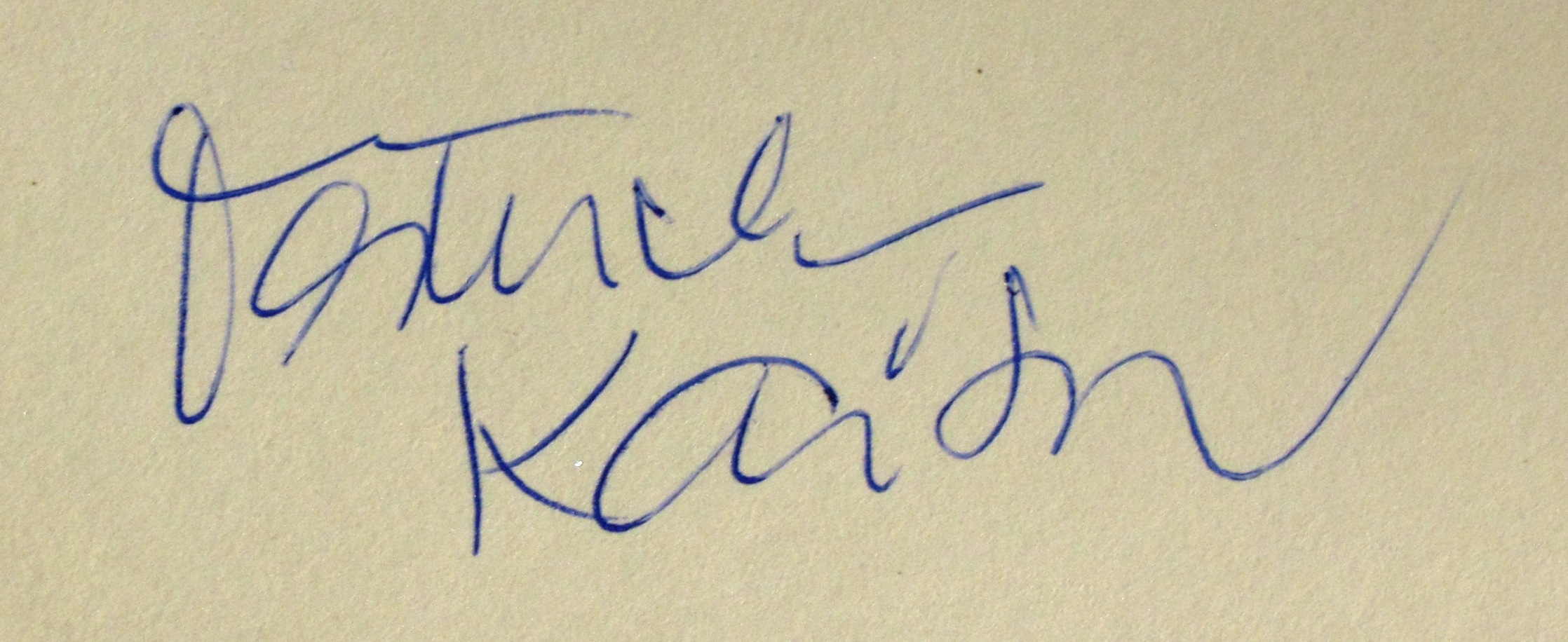

Oldřich Kaiser (born 16 May 1955) is a Czech television, film, and stage actor known mostly for his comedic roles.

== Education and career ==
Kaiser graduated from the Academy of Performing Arts in Prague in 1978. He began his acting career with theatre performances, working at Studio Ypsilon in Liberec and later at the National Theatre in Prague. He made his screen debut in Karel Kachyňa's 1973 film Láska.

Together with Jiří Lábus, he formed the comedy duo "Kaiser a Lábus", which took part in such television comedy shows as Možná přijde i kouzelník (1982) and Ruská ruleta (1994).

== Personal life and trivia ==
Between 1980 and 2005, Kaiser was married to Czech actress Naďa Konvalinková, with whom he has a daughter, actress Karolína Kaiserová. In 2020, he married singer Dáša Vokatá.

In 2004, he discovered a new species of ground beetle in Asia with entomologist and neurosurgeon Vladimír Beneš. The insect was subsequently named Cychrus kaiseri, after the actor.

In July 2019, Kaiser survived a heart attack.

== Selected filmography ==
=== Film ===
List of film appearances, with year, title, and role shown
Year	Title	Role	Notes
1973	Láska	Petr	
1991	Slunce, seno, erotika	Vincenzo	
2001	Dark Blue World	Jan Machatý	
2003	Mazaný Filip	Don Perrugini	
2006	I Served the King of England	older Jan Dítě	
2009	You Kiss like a God	František	
2010	Habermann	Brichta	
2010	Walking Too Fast	Janeček	
2010	Kooky	Homeless man	
2011	Leaving	Viktor	
2011	Vendeta	Gamekeeper Mazura	
2012	Líbáš jako ďábel	František	
2014	Three Brothers	Father of the brothers	
2016	A Prominent Patient	Edvard Beneš	
2016	Řachanda	Night watchman	
2017	Barefoot	Vlk	

=== Television ===
List of television appearances, with year, title, and role shown
Year	Title	Role	Notes
1981	Hospital at the End of the City	Vojtěch Peterka	6 episodes
1983–2000	Možná přijde i kouzelník	Himself	18 episodes
1994–98	Ruská ruleta	Himself	24 episodes
2004	Černí baroni	Lt. Troník	10 episodes
2008	Hospital at the End of the City - The New Generation	Vojtěch Peterka	3 episodes

== Awards and recognition ==
- Nominated for Czech Lion Award, Best Actor for I Served the King of England (2007)
- Nominated for Czech Lion Award, Best Supporting Actor for Walking Too Fast (2010)
- Nominated for Czech Lion Award, Best Supporting Actor for Leaving (2011)
- Nominated for Czech Lion Award, Best Supporting Actor for Vendeta (2011)
- Czech Lion Award, Best Supporting Actor for A Prominent Patient (2016)
- Czech Lion Award, Best Supporting Actor for Barefoot (2017)
- Czech Lion Award, Best Supporting Actor for The Man with Hare Ears (2021)
- Czech Lion Award, Best Actor for The Gardener's Year (2024)
