= Nesmrtelná teta =

1993 film

- Directed by: Zdeněk Zelenka
- Written by: Zdeněk Zelenka
- Music by: Jiří Svoboda
- Release date: November 25, 1993
- Running time: 95 minutes
- Country: Czech Republic
- Language: Czech

Nesmrtelná teta is a 1993 Czech film written and directed by Zdeněk Zelenka.
