= Jiří Schmitzer =

Czech actor and musician (born 1949)

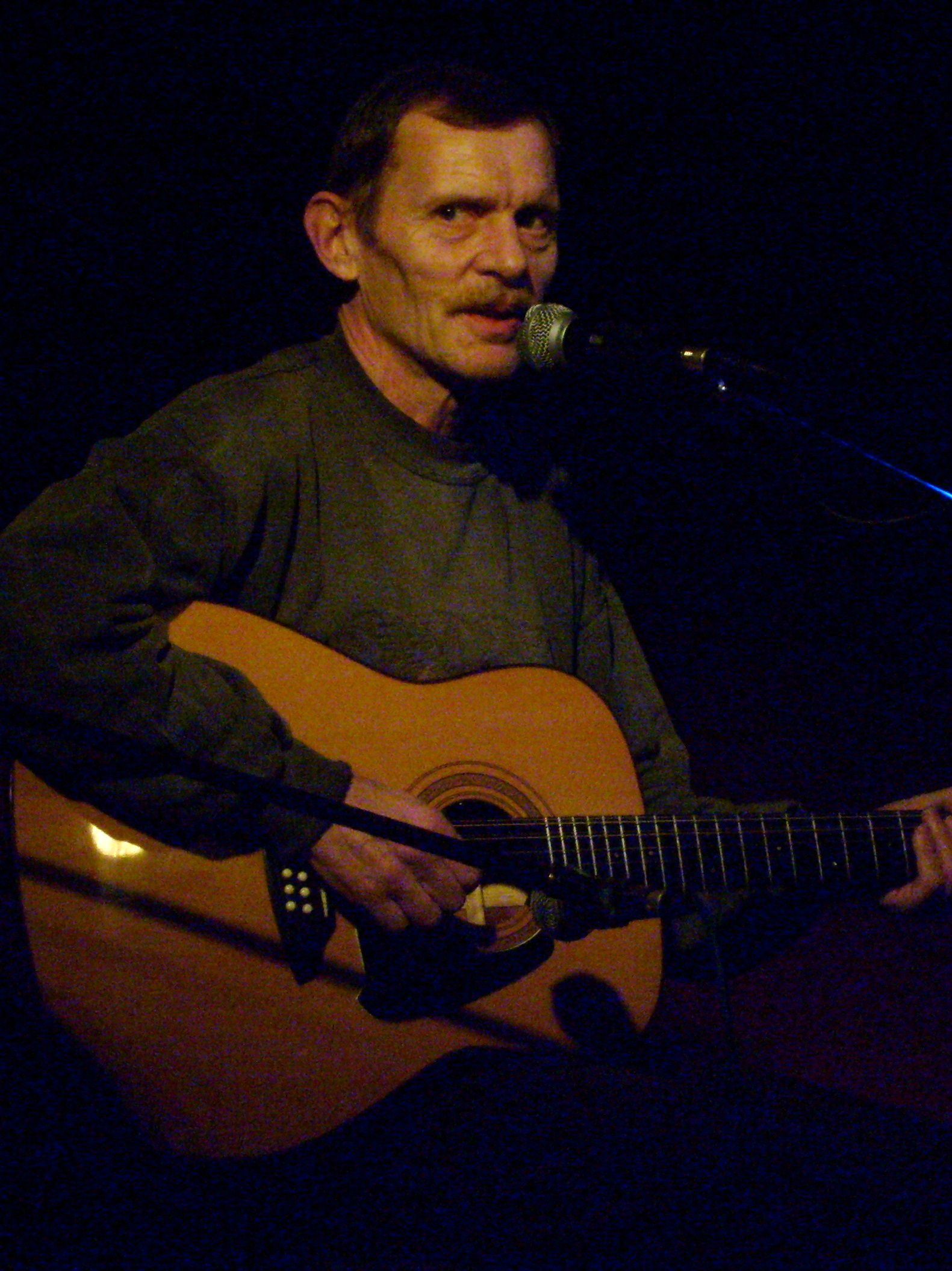
- Schmitzer in 2008
- Born: 25 October 1949 (age 76); Prague, Czechoslovakia
- Education: Theatre Faculty of the Academy of Performing Arts in Prague
- Occupations: Actor, musician
- Years active: 1966–present
- Parent: Jiří Sovák
- Awards: Czech Lion

Jiří Schmitzer (born 25 October 1949) is a Czech actor and musician, the son of actor Jiří Sovák. He is a four-time holder of the Czech Lion Award for Best Actor in a Leading Role.

== Biography ==
=== Career ===
Schmitzer graduated from the Theatre Faculty of the Academy of Performing Arts in Prague in 1974, after which he performed at the Činoherní studio in Ústí nad Labem. From 1985, he was a member of the Studio Ypsilon ensemble in Liberec.

Schmitzer made his television debut in 1966 with the series Eliška a její rod. He first appeared onscreen in the 1967 production Kinoautomat, considered the world's first interactive movie. He played prominent roles in such films as Marecek, Pass Me the Pen! (1976), Cutting It Short (1980), The Snowdrop Festival (1984), Černí baroni (1992), and the television series Chalupáři (1975) and Sanitka (1984). In 1997, Schmitzer won his first Czech Lion Award as Best Actor in a Leading Role for the television film Bumerang (1997). He has since won the award three more times, for the films Beauty in Trouble (2006), Jako nikdy (2013), and Staříci (2019).

Schmitzer is also a composer, having written music for a number of theatrical productions and films. He is additionally a singer and guitarist, performing humorous folk songs. He has released four studio albums. In 2008, Schmitzer published a collection of his texts in a book titled Kanimůra ze Šardonu.

=== Personal life ===
In 1976, under the influence of alcohol, Schmitzer caused a car accident in which a pedestrian died. He was sentenced to three years in prison and released after a year and a half for good behaviour. His father, Jiří Sovák, never forgave him for this, cutting off all contact with his son and eventually disowning him. Prior to the accident, Schmitzer had acted in several productions with his father, including the film Marecek, Pass Me the Pen! and the series Chalupáři. In the film they played son and father and in the series, the two played grandson and grandfather, respectively. In the 1977 sci-fi comedy Tomorrow I'll Wake Up and Scald Myself with Tea, Schmitzer voiced a younger version of his father's character.

== Selected filmography ==
=== Film ===
List of film appearances, with year, title, and role shown
Year	Title	Role	Notes
1967	Kinoautomat		
1976	Marecek, Pass Me the Pen!	Jiří Kroupa Jr.	
1977	Tomorrow I'll Wake Up and Scald Myself with Tea	Young Klaus Abard	Voice, uncredited
1980	Cutting It Short	Francin	
1984	The Snowdrop Festival	Láďa Novák	
1985	My Sweet Little Village	Police officer	
1988	Dům pro dva	Bóza	
1992	Černí baroni	Lieutenant Hamáček	
1993	The Trial	Thin defendant	
1997	Báječná léta pod psa	Dr. Liehr	
2000	Wild Flowers	Umrlec	Segment "Svatební košile"
2006	Beauty in Trouble	Richard	
2007	Gympl	Czech teacher Karel	
2007	Empties		
2008	I'm All Good	Tonda	
2010	Kooky	Creeper	Voice
2012	Seven Days of Sin	Ditrich	
2013	Jako nikdy	Vladimír	
2019	Staříci	Vlastimil Reiner	

=== Television ===
List of television appearances, with year, title, and role shown
Year	Title	Role	Notes
1966	Eliška a její rod		2 episodes
1975	Chalupáři	Slávek Krbec	7 episodes
1984	Sanitka	Ambulance man	5 episodes
1997	Bumerang	Jaroslav Svoboda	TV film

== Discography ==
- Recitál (1997)
- Šílenec (2000)
- Bouda (2003)
- Sbírka kiksů (2008)
