= List of highest-grossing Czech films =

This is a list of the highest-grossing Czech films, with box office from Czech cinemas given in Czech korunas.

== Highest-grossing Czech films ==
The following table lists Czech films that grossed over 100 Million Czech korunas.

Rank	Title	Distributor	Year	Box office	Source
1	Women on the Run	CinemArt	2019	211,925,133 CZK	
2	Waves	Bontonfilm	2024	158,788,814 CZK	
3	Anděl Páně 2	Falcon	2016	146,653,736 CZK	
4	Empties	Falcon	2007	124,600,000 CZK	
5	Ženy v pokušení	Falcon	2010	124,100,000 CZK	
6	Vyšehrad: Fylm	Bioscop	2022	108,037,273 CZK	
7	ONEMANSHOW: The Movie	Bontonfilm	2023	100,708,108 CZK	

== Highest-grossing films by year ==
Year	Title	Director	Distributor	Box office	Source
2025	Vyšehrad Dvje	Jakub Štáfek, Martin Kopp	Bioscop	89,960 237 CZK	
2024	Waves	Jiří Mádl	Bontonfilm	158,788,814 CZK	
2023	ONEMANSHOW: The Movie	Andy Fehu, Kazma Kazmitch	Bontonfilm	100,708,108 CZK	
2022	Vyšehrad: Fylm	Jakub Štáfek, Martin Kopp	Bioscop	108,037,273 CZK	
2021	Bet on Friendship	Patrik Hartl	Bontonfilm	92,830,114 CZK	
2020	Caught in the Net	Vít Klusák, Barbora Chalupová	Aerofilms	61,068,069 CZK	
2019	Women on the Run	Martin Horský	CinemArt	211,925,133 CZK	
2018	What Men Want	Rudolf Havlík	CinemArt	82,620,472 CZK	
2017	Barefoot	Jan Svěrák	Bioscop	64,813,000 CZK	
2016	Anděl Páně 2	Jiří Strach	Falcon	146,653,736 CZK	
2015	Life is Life	Milan Cieslar	Bontonfilm	32,760,954 CZK	
2014	Three Brothers	Jan Svěrák	Bioscop	73,549,281 CZK	
2013	Babovřesky	Zdeněk Troška	Falcon	86,293,472 CZK	
2012	Líbáš jako ďábel	Marie Poledňáková	Falcon	54,612,524 CZK	
2011	Men in Hope	Jiří Vejdělek	Falcon	94,349,896 CZK	
2010	Ženy v pokušení	Jiří Vejdělek	Falcon	123,812,944 CZK	
2009	You Kiss like a God	Marie Poledňáková	Falcon	89,850,536 CZK	
2008	Bathory	Juraj Jakubisko	Bontonfilm	86,752,291 CZK	
2007	Empties	Jan Svěrák	Falcon	124,319,332 CZK	
2006	Holiday Makers	Jiří Vejdělek	Falcon	76,313,372 CZK	
2005	Román pro ženy	Filip Renč	Bioscop	52,038,575 CZK	
2004	Up and Down	Jan Hřebejk	Falcon	55,311,889 CZK	
2003	Pupendo	Jan Hřebejk	Falcon	86,604,395 CZK	
2002	Year of the Devil	Petr Zelenka	Falcon	18,180,492 CZK	
2001	Dark Blue World	Jan Svěrák	CinemArt	89,021,318 CZK	
2000	Loners	David Ondříček	CinemArt	27,965,846 CZK	
1999	Cosy Dens	Jan Hřebejk	Space Films	55,078,099 CZK	
1998	Time of Debts	Irena Pavlásková	Bontonfilm	11,197,382 CZK	
1997	Those Wonderful Years That Sucked	Petr Nikolaev	Space Films	14,000,000 CZK	
1996	Kolya	Jan Svěrák	Space Films	45,000,000 CZK	
1995	There Once Was a Cop	Jaroslav Soukup	Ocean Film	4,673,390 CZK	
1994	Akumulator 1	Jan Svěrák	Heureka Production	10,470,107 CZK	
1993	The End of Poets in Bohemia	Dušan Klein	Heureka Production	21,238,367 CZK	
1992	Černí baroni	Zdeněk Sirový	Space Films	26,181,814 KČs	
1991	Tank Battalion	Vít Olmer	Space Films	25,228,972 KČs	
1990	Larks on a String	Jiří Menzel	Ústřední půjčovna filmů	5,737,000 KČs	
1988	Bony a klid	Vít Olmer	Ústřední půjčovna filmů	24,206,073 KČs	
1987	Why?	Karel Smyczek	Ústřední půjčovna filmů		
1985	My Sweet Little Village	Jiří Menzel	Ústřední půjčovna filmů	30,522,547 KČs	
1984	Slunce, seno, jahody	Zdeněk Troška	Ústřední půjčovna filmů	21,502,258 KČs	
1982	I Enjoy the World with You	Marie Poledňáková	Ústřední půjčovna filmů	17,091,070 KČs	
1981	Cutting It Short	Jiří Menzel	Ústřední půjčovna filmů	18,554,961 KČs	
1978	Let Him Face the Music!	Ladislav Rychman	Ústřední půjčovna filmů	9,412,583 KČs	
1977	The Apple Game	Věra Chytilová	Ústřední půjčovna filmů	2,801,159 KČs	
1976	Marecek, Pass Me the Pen!	Oldřich Lipský	Ústřední půjčovna filmů		
1975	How to Drown Dr. Mracek, the Lawyer	Václav Vorlíček	Ústřední půjčovna filmů	15,094,716 KČs	
1974	Jáchyme, hoď ho do stroje!	Oldřich Lipský	Ústřední půjčovna filmů	17,068,911 KČs	
1973	Three Wishes for Cinderella	Václav Vorlíček	Ústřední půjčovna filmů	8,807,338 KČs	
1972	The Girl on the Broomstick	Václav Vorlíček	Ústřední půjčovna filmů	10,738,917 KČs	
1971	You Are a Widow, Sir	Václav Vorlíček	Ústřední půjčovna filmů	12,584,239 KČs	
1970	Witchhammer	Otakar Vávra	Ústřední půjčovna filmů		
1968	The Incredibly Sad Princess	Bořivoj Zeman	Ústřední půjčovna filmů	9,255,041 KČs	
1967	Ta naše písnička česká	Zdeněk Podskalský	Ústřední půjčovna filmů		
1966	Closely Watched Trains	Jiří Menzel	Ústřední půjčovna filmů	7,519,550 KČs	
1965	The Hop Pickers	Ladislav Rychman	Ústřední půjčovna filmů	14,352,635 KČs	
1964	Lemonade Joe	Oldřich Lipský	Ústřední půjčovna filmů	21,037,207 KČs	
1963	The Cassandra Cat	Vojtěch Jasný	Ústřední půjčovna filmů	9,457,597 KČs	
1962	The Fabulous Baron Munchausen	Karel Zeman	Ústřední půjčovna filmů	4,696,795 KČs	
1960	Dařbuján a Pandrhola	Martin Frič	Ústřední půjčovna filmů		
1958	I Dutifully Report	Karel Steklý	Ústřední půjčovna filmů	12,344,338 KČs	
1957	Playing with the Devil	Josef Mach	Ústřední půjčovna filmů	9,769,642 KČs	
1956	The Good Soldier Schweik	Karel Steklý	Ústřední půjčovna filmů	13,700,156 KČs	
1955	Once Upon a Time, There Was a King...	Bořivoj Zeman	Rozdělovna filmů ČSF	13,515,414 KČs	
1953	Dovolená s Andělem	Bořivoj Zeman	Rozdělovna filmů ČSF		
1952	The Proud Princess	Bořivoj Zeman	Rozdělovna filmů ČSF	14,908,491 KČs	
1951	The Merry Duel	Miloš Makovec	Rozdělovna filmů ČSF	8,021,918 KČs	

== See also ==
- List of highest-grossing films
- List of most expensive films
- List of most expensive Czech films
