= Circus in the Circus =

1976 Czechoslovak-Soviet comedy film

- Film poster
- Directed by: Oldřich Lipský
- Written by: Oldřich Lipský; Yakov Kostyukovskiy; Miloš Macourek; Moris Slobodskoy
- Starring: Evgeni Leonov
- Cinematography: Jaroslav Kučera
- Production companies: Barrandov Studios; Mosfilm
- Release date: February 1976
- Running time: 131 minutes
- Countries: Czechoslovakia; Soviet Union
- Languages: Czech; Russian

Circus in the Circus (Czech: Cirkus v cirkuse; Russian: Соло для слона с оркестром) is a Czechoslovak-Soviet comedy film directed by Oldřich Lipský and released in 1976. The story takes place in the Big State Circus in Moscow where two international groups arrive simultaneously: a jury searching for outstanding numbers for the World Circus festival and a delegation of animal language scientists. The film was selected as the Czechoslovak entry for the Best Foreign Language Film at the 48th Academy Awards, but was not accepted as a nominee. All circus acts were performed by Moscow and Zaporizhzhia circus troupes.

== Plot ==
The story takes place in Moscow, where an international circus jury has arrived to select acts from the Moscow Circus on Lenin Hills for an upcoming international circus festival. The jury is impressed by the exceptional performances, finding it difficult to choose the best act for the competition.

At the same time, a delegation of animal linguists (experts in animal languages) comes to Moscow for a scientific conference at Moscow State University. During the conference, Professor Ruzicka from Prague argues with his English colleague, Mrs. Whistler, about whether an elephant can be taught to sing. To prove his point, the two scientists visit the nearby circus to conduct an experiment—teaching an elephant to sing.

Meanwhile, Grisha, who is in love with Tanya, the circus director's daughter, becomes jealous when he sees her interested in Alyosha, a young food vendor who accidentally spilled juice on Grisha's jacket. Seeking revenge, Grisha goes to the circus director, Ivanov, demanding Alyosha be fired. However, Ivanov refuses, as he is focused on the upcoming showcase performance for the international jury. Determined to get back at Alyosha, Grisha tries to sabotage the performance by putting sleeping pills in the refreshments, gluing plates together, and causing friction between Alyosha and the director. Despite his efforts, love ultimately prevails, and the show goes on successfully—with the elephant singing.

== Cast ==
- Jiří Sovák as Prof. Ruzicka
- Iva Janžurová as Doc. Whistlerová
- Yevgeny Leonov as Reditel cirkusu
- Natalya Varley as Tána
- Alexander Lenkov as Císník Aljosa
- Leonid Kuravlyov as Grísa
- Savely Kramarov as Lopuchov
- Aleksei Smirnov as a hypnotist Smirnov
- Yevgeny Morgunov as Kolia
- Yuri Volyntsev as Aleksandr Borisovich
- Josef Hlinomaz as Nikolai, an elephant trainer
- Jaroslava Schallerová as a zoo-philologist's secretary
- František Filipovský as a Sandy Express reporter
- Zdeněk Dítě as an Italian jury member
- Lubomír Lipský as a Czech jury member
- Oldřich Velen as a Norwegian jury member
- Karel Effa as a vet

== See also ==
- List of submissions to the 48th Academy Awards for Best Foreign Language Film
- List of Czechoslovak submissions for the Academy Award for Best Foreign Language Film
