= The Unconquered (1956 film) =

- Directed by: Jiří Sequens
- Written by: Milan Jariš; Vladimír Bor; Jiří Sequens
- Starring: Ladislav Chudík; Gustav Heverle
- Release date: 16 November 1956
- Running time: 87 minutes
- Country: Czechoslovakia
- Language: Czech

The Unconquered (Czech: Neporažení) is a 1956 Czechoslovak war film. It is loosely inspired by the Battle of Czajánek's barracks. It is about soldiers of the Czechoslovak army who refuse to surrender during the German occupation of Czechoslovakia and fight back.

== Plot ==
The film is set in March 1939. Czechoslovakia is occupied by Germany. All units are ordered to surrender. The films is about soldiers located in a barracks close to Polish border. Officers are divided whether to obey or not. Captain Richter is uncertain. First lieutenant Žáček would obey. Corporal Říha wants to fight. Říha eventually takes over the unit and prepares them to fight. Žáček tries to stop him and tries to persuade Richter to make order. Žáček threatens Říha with weapon but is killed by soldiers. When Germans get close to the barracks, battle begins. Soldiers are at first successful but are outnumbered and their positions are unsustainable. Richter commits suicide and Lieutenant Brandejs tries to surrender but is gunned down by Germans. Říha decides to withdraw soldiers to Poland but stays in the barracks alone and dies in a battle with Germans.

== Cast ==
- Ladislav Chudík as Captain Richter
- Gustav Heverle as Corporal Říha
- Jaroslav Mareš as Private Pepík
- Jiří Sovák as Private Jarda
- Martin Růžek as First lieutenant Žáček
- František Vnouček as Rotmistr
- Jaromír Spal as Sergeant Hrabák
- Martin Ťapák as Private Janko
- Svatopluk Beneš as Private Brandejs
- Vladimír Krška as Private Tonek
- Jarmila Kurandová as Chválová
- Jana Dítětová as Lída
- Naďa Gajerová as Anči
- Rudolf Deyl Jr. as Jura
- Vladimír Salač as Private Franta
- Josef Vinklář as Private Mirek
- Miloš Nedbal as German Major
- Ivo Gübel as German Captain
