= Svět otevřený náhodám =

1971 film

- Directed by: Karel Steklý
- Written by: Josef Kadlec; Karel Steklý
- Starring: Miloš Kopecký
- Release date: 1971
- Running time: 97 minutes
- Country: Czechoslovakia
- Language: Czech

Svět otevřený náhodám is a 1971 Czechoslovak drama film directed by Karel Steklý.

== Cast ==
- Miloš Kopecký as Rataj
- Josef Bek as Procurist
- Lubomír Bryg
- Slávka Budínová as Innkeeper Marta
- Jiri Ceporan as Sípek
- Jirí Dudesek as Singer
- Zita Kabátová as Mother
- Willy Kuk-Znamínko as Startér
- Eva Lorenzová as Dáma
- Consuela Morávková as Karla
- Milos Nesvadba as Foreman
- Ela Poznerová as Lady
- René Pribil as Eman
- Tomás Sedlácek as Vojta
- Jana Švandová as Slávka
- Oldřich Velen as Merta
- Milada Vnuková as Berticka
