= Panoptikum města pražského =

1988 Czechoslovak television series

- Genre: Drama
- Written by: Jiří Marek
- Directed by: Antonín Moskalyk
- Country of origin: Czechoslovakia
- No. of episodes: 10

Production
- Running time: 64 minutes

Original release
- Release: April 2 – June 4, 1988

Panoptikum města pražského (English: A Prague Underworld) was a Czechoslovak television programme which was first broadcast on 2 April 1988. The programme was written by Jiří Marek and directed by Antonín Moskalyk. It is a sequel to The Sinful People of Prague.

== Cast and characters ==
- Jiří Adamíra as Korejs
- Josef Vinklář as Josef Bouše
- Josef Bláha as Josef Brůžek
- Ondřej Havelka as Dr. Souček
- František Filipovský as Václav Mrázek
- Bedřich Prokoš as police president
- Dalimil Klapka as police medic
