= Tereza Kostková =

Czech actress and television presenter (born 1976)

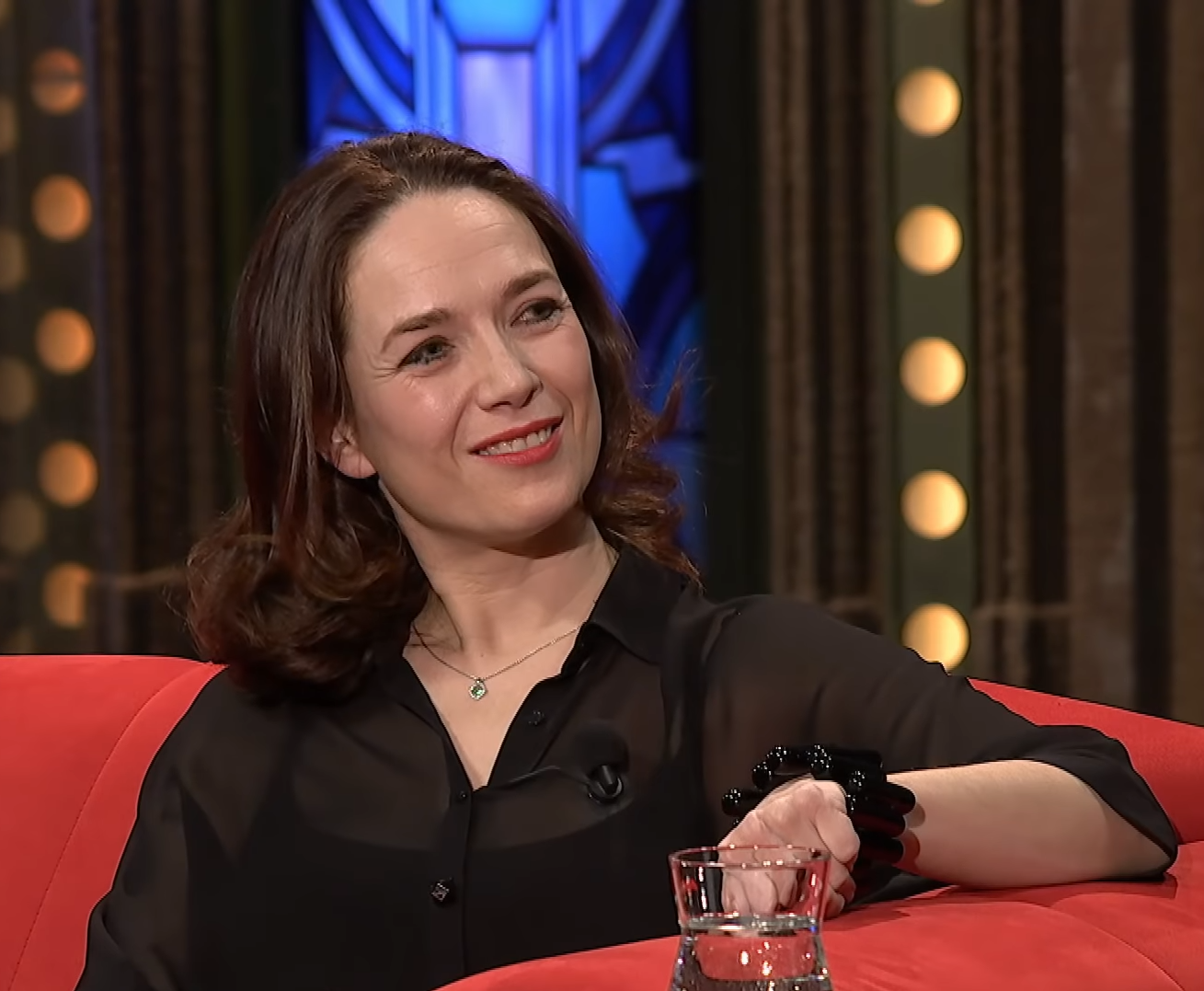
- Kostková in 2021
- Born: 14 June 1976 (age 50); Prague, Czechoslovakia
- Education: VOŠ herecká
- Occupations: Actress; television presenter
- Years active: 1993–present
- Spouses: Petr Kracik (m. 2006; div. 2015) Jakub Nvota (m. 2018)
- Parent(s): Petr Kostka (father); Carmen Mayerová (mother)
- Relatives: Zora Kostková (aunt)
- Website: terezakostkova.com

Tereza Kostková (born 14 June 1976) is a Czech actress and television presenter, daughter of actors Petr Kostka and Carmen Mayerová.

== Biography ==
=== Career ===
After graduating from high school, Kostková studied at the VOŠ herecká acting college, where she earned an associate degree, after which she began working in theatre.

Between 1997 and 1999, she worked at the Západočeské divadlo in Cheb and between 1999 and 2014, she was based at the Divadlo pod Palmovkou in Prague. She has been active in a number of other theatres, including Broadway Theatre (Prague).

Since 2006, she has co-hosted the television show StarDance with Marek Eben. In 2009, she co-hosted Duety… když hvězdy zpívají with Aleš Háma.

Kostková has appeared in numerous television shows, including Bazén, Proč bychom se netopili, Pojišťovna štěstí, Ordinace v růžové zahradě 2, Obchoďák, Cesty domů, Vinaři, and Temný Kraj. Her film roles include Líbáš jako ďábel (2012) and Women on the Run (2019).

=== Personal life ===
Kostková is distantly related to actor Rudolf Hrušínský, on her father's side.

Between 2006 and 2015, she was married to theatre director and manager Petr Kracik, with whom she has a son, Antonín. Since 2018, she has been married to Jakub Nvota.

== Selected filmography ==
=== Film ===
List of film appearances, with year, title, and role shown
Year	Title	Role	Notes
2006	Všechno nejlepší!	Evička	
2012	Líbáš jako ďábel	Monika	
2019	Women on the Run	Marcela	

=== Television ===
List of television appearances, with year, title, and role shown
Year	Title	Role	Notes
2003	Četnické humoresky	Amálie	2 episodes
2004–10	Pojišťovna štěstí	Andrea Krausová	59 episodes
2005	Bazén	8 episodes	
2009	Proč bychom se netopili	Lída	10 episodes
2009–11	Ordinace v růžové zahradě 2	Dana Zadinová / Danuse Holubová	114 episodes
2011–15	Cesty domů	Bára Vítková	137 episodes
2012	Obchoďák	Vanda Plavcová	32 episodes
2014–15	Vinaři	Katerina Hýsková	19 episodes
2017–19	Temný Kraj	Tereza Coufalová	26 episodes
