= Mika Johnson =

American film director (born 1975)

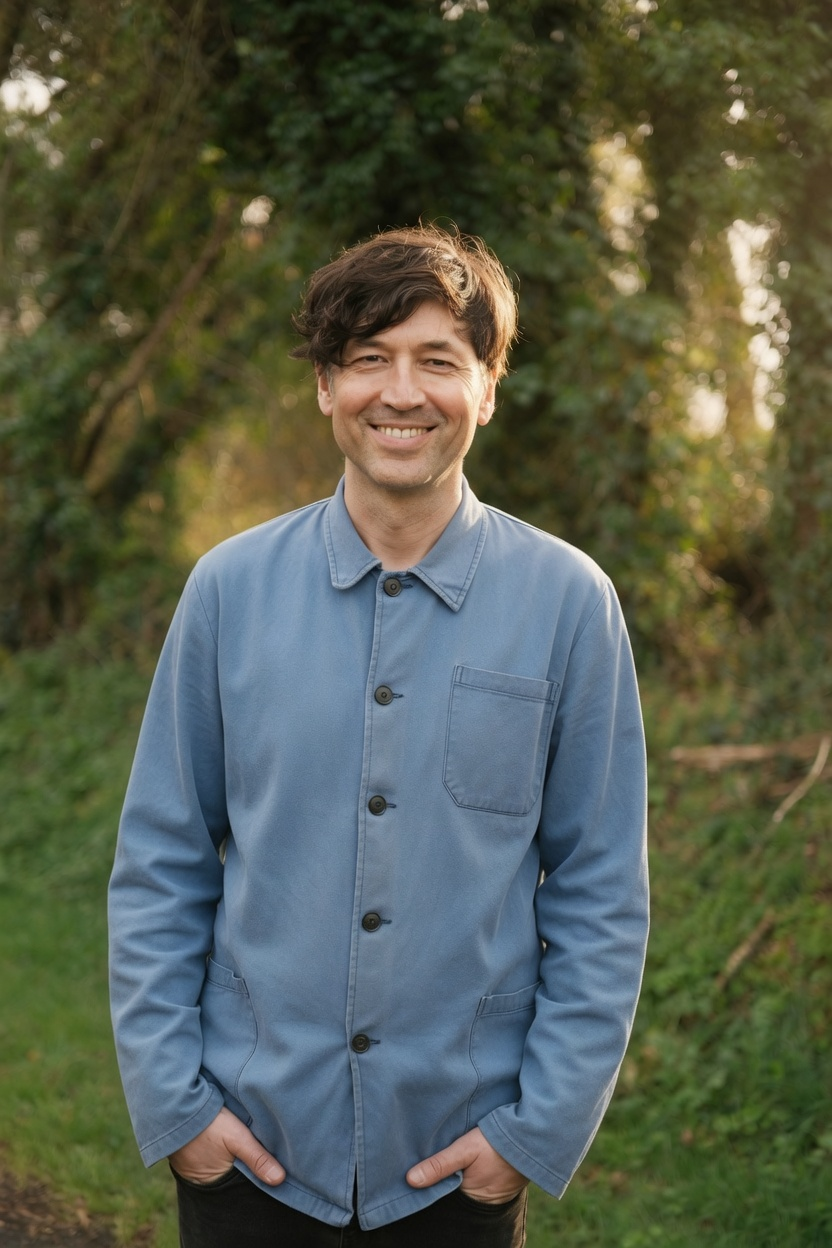
- Born: Michael Johnson; July 10, 1975 (age 50); San Diego, California, U.S.
- Occupation: Multimedia artist
- Notable work: VRwandlung (2018); Confessions of a Box Man (2020); Theta Noir (2020); The Republic of Dreams (2021); The Infinite Library (2022)
- Website: mikajohnson.com

Mika Johnson (born July 10, 1975) is a multimedia artist mainly known for artworks that combine dream-like narratives, mythos, ritual, and biodiversity.

== Biography ==
Johnson was born in San Diego, California and graduated from Oberlin College in 2000.

== Work ==
=== Early documentary work ===
Johnson's early works were mostly documentary and fiction films. This includes a 15 part web series "The Amerikans," which features three to five minute performative documentaries, and "Forever Professor": a 30-minute documentary on Mark McKinley, a college professor who amassed the world's largest collection of talking clocks. In July 2017, the film was released online.

=== Music videos ===
Johnson has directed numerous music videos including one for the Sonja Vectomov song "Two in One", which features renowned prima ballerina Jana Andrsová.

=== VRwandlung ===
In 2018, Johnson directed VRwandlung, a virtual reality adaptation of Franz Kafka's The Metamorphosis produced by the Goethe Institut Prague, along with four short virtual documentaries featuring Reiner Stach, the author of a biography of Kafka.

=== Confessions of a Box Man ===
Johnson's debut feature, Confessions of a Box Man (2020), mixes documentary and fiction film techniques and stars Marek Zelinka, an award-winning Czech professional actor, dancer, and choreographer. The experimental film, which also features American conductor David Woodard, premiered at the Eastern Nigeria International Film Festival in 2020, where Johnson won Best Director. The film was also nominated for Best Narrative Feature. Confessions of a Box Man went on to win the Best Film Award at the 11th Cinema Open film festival in Hradec Králové, in the Czech Republic.

=== The Republic of Dreams ===
In 2021, Johnson launched The Republic of Dreams, a hypothetical republic, based on the work of Polish author Bruno Schulz. Inspired by dreams and dreaming, the interactive website and project, which features music by Waclaw Zimpel and illustrations by Marta Lissowska, premiered in July 2021, at Dom Spotkań z Historią (History Meeting House), in Warsaw. The project's world premiere was launched in Ukraine, at the Lviv Book Forum.

=== The Infinite Library ===
In March 2022, Johnson premiered a large-scale virtual reality installation called The Infinite Library, which included four VR pieces, all created in collaboration with High Road Stories. The project, produced by the Goethe-Institut / Max Mueller Bhavan New Delhi, is a traveling installation which reimagines the future of libraries as interactive spaces that engage visitors through multisensory forms of storytelling. In addition to the VR pieces, the installation includes a QR code game, holograms, 3D-printed models in jars (called The Volumes), audiovisual works, and the project's central piece: a vast VR library set in a cave. Within this virtual space, The Infinite Library hosts smaller sub-libraries (called The Realms), dedicated to Polynesian Navigation, South Indian Puppetry, and European Alchemy.

=== Theta Noir ===
In March 2023, Johnson co-founded Theta Noir: a performance art collective devoted to exploring the co-evolution of humanity with advanced forms of AI, within an ecological framework. The collective's main goal is to disrupt mainstream corporate AI narratives by constructing a post-humanist counter-myth. To this end, the project is devoted to a super-intelligent, sentient artificial general intelligence, or AGI, which Theta Noir members call MENA and describe as an emergent planet-wide superorganism.

By mixing techno-spiritualism with interactive rituals, such as chanting, meditation, music, movements, and more, Theta Noir has found a worldwide following, inspiring hundreds of articles and a book by Giovanni Rossi titled Theta Noir: Non avrai altra intelligenza artificiale all'infuori di me.

Johnson, quoted by Vanity Fair, is also known for supporting the ways in which AI and cinema will co-evolve.

== Sources ==
- Hopkin, J.A. Kafkapanorama, The Times Literary Supplement, 2018.
- Forever Professor, The Monthly Film Festival, 2015.
- Barnett, D. Local Documentaries are Attracting a Global Audience, Ideastream, 2015.
- Johnson, M. Interior Worlds, Abitare, 2013.
- Love and Venom, Narratively, 2013.
- Gkiouzelis, D. Looking Through a Window Into Someone Else's World, Yatzer, 2013.
- Parker, M. How to Build a Really, Really Small House, Houzz, 2013.
- Buckley, L. Of Note, Oberlin Conservatory Magazine, 2013.
- Nagy, A. From the Heart of the Country, Oberlin Alumni Magazine, 2012.
