= Women on the Run =

Women on the Run may refer to:

- Women on the Run (TV series), a 2005 Hong Kong drama series
- Women on the Run (film), a 2019 Czech comedy film

== See also ==
- Woman on the Run, a 1950 American crime film noir
- Woman on the Run: The Lawrencia Bembenek Story, a 1993 American drama film
