= Slovak hip-hop =

Subculture in Slovakia

Slovak hip hop is said to have begun in 1988, before the establishment of the Slovak Republic itself. The first rap song released in Slovakia was done by Rap Steady Crew from Košice in 1993, followed by Jednotka slovenskej starostlivosti (JSS) with their album Kompromis in 1997 as well as the duo Trosky releasing their record. Long-running crews are Lúza and Drvivá Menšina, who perform together as Názov Stavby with DJ Hajtkovič. Vec, formerly of the seminal duo Trosky, is considered by many today to be the most influential figure within hip-hop music in Slovakia, although newer acts such as 2H+, A.M.O, MC Vrabec, Čistychov and Kontrafakt have also gained significant popularity since 2003. Slovak hip hop was considered to start becoming popular when Kontrafakt released their first music video, Dáva mi, in 2003. It topped many video charts in Slovakia and the Czech Republic. The video even appeared on MTV. Kontrafakt's platinum debut album E.R.A. (along with albums Reč Naša by Názov Stavby and Trosky by Trosky) is considered to be one of the albums with the "classic" status.

In 2015, Sídliskový sen, a documentary film about Rytmus was released, after eight years of filming. In 2020, another documentary film tied to Slovak hip-hop, TEMPOS, was released, and while this documentary is also about Rytmus himself, it focuses less on his personal life and more on his career in hip-hop. The documentary film is considered to be deeply tied to the origins of Slovak hip-hop and Slovak hip-hop as a whole. In 2021 Kontrafakt released a documentary film on their YouTube channel, The Most Legendary, which was released a few days before their 5th studio album, KF ako rolls, was released to celebrate their twentieth anniversary as a group. The documentary explained the timeline of the group as a whole.

Nearly all Slovak hip-hop artists rap in Slovak and often collaborate with Czech artists like PSH, DJ Wich, Yzomandias, Nik Tendo and Polish WWO. Sometimes they collaborate with people from different countries, like Russian P-13 artists.

Kontrafakt is the best-selling hip-hop group in Slovakia.
