= Hroch =

1973 film

- Czech cover
- Directed by: Karel Steklý
- Written by: Karel Steklý
- Produced by: Jiří Zika
- Starring: Oldo Hlavácek
- Cinematography: František Uldrich
- Edited by: Jan Kohout
- Music by: Jaromír Klempíř
- Release date: 1 March 1974
- Running time: 95 minutes
- Country: Czechoslovakia
- Language: Czech

Hroch is a 1974 Czechoslovak comedy film directed by Karel Steklý. The film was meant as a political satire that would be a parable of Prague Spring. The film was notable for negative reception, and is often viewed as the worst Czech film ever made.

== Cast ==
- Oldo Hlaváček as Hroch
- Helga Čočková as Dása
- Svatopluk Matyáš as Pip Karen
- Helena Blehárová as Sona
- Miroslav Homola as Borovec
- Zdena Hadrbolcová as Plasilová
- Eduard Dubský as Prof. Fibinger
- Jirí Lír as Keeper
- Slávka Budínová as Majka
- Josef Větrovec as Zoo Director
- Oldřich Velen as Veterinary
- Josef Kobr as Bank Director
- Jiří Holý as Husband of Sona
- Jan Skopeček as Dentist

== Hroch Awards ==
Hroch is often called the worst Czech film ever made. Hroch awards that are annually given by the words Czech film of the year are named after the film.
