= Stanislav Fišer =

Czech actor (1931–2022)

- Born: 14 December 1931; Hořice, Czechoslovakia
- Died: 11 June 2022 (aged 90); Prague, Czech Republic
- Occupation: Actor
- Awards: František Filipovský Award for Lifetime Achievement in Voice Acting

Stanislav Fišer (14 December 1931 – 11 June 2022) was a Czech actor and voice actor.

== Life ==
Fišer was born in Hořice. He started as an amateur actor, after World War II. He first played in the Theatre for Youth, run by Míla Mellanová. He then went on to work at the Vinohrady Theatre, the Jiří Wolker Theatre and the E. F. Burian Theatre. From 1959 he worked for Jan Werich at the ABC Theatre, which was later incorporated into the Prague City Theatres, where he remained under the direction of Ota Ornest until his retirement in 1993.

He played his first episodic roles in the famous Czech films The Stone Table Inn (1948) and Rodinné trampoty oficiála Tříšky (Family troubles of Mr.Tříška, a clerk, 1949). From the second half of the 1950s until the 1990s, he was one of the most widely cast film and television actors. He often played episodic comic or negative roles.

In 1999, he received the František Filipovský Award for lifetime achievement in voice acting.

== Illness and death ==
In 2004, he was diagnosed with laryngeal cancer by doctors and had to undergo a radical procedure in which his vocal cords were removed, thus losing his unmistakable voice. He could not speak without a special device and lived in seclusion until his death.

== Theatre roles, selection ==
- Těžká Barbora, (1960 in ABC Theatre)
- Thornton Wilder: Mrs Dolly, the Matchmaker, Barnabas Tucker, (1962 in ABC Theatre)
- Maurice Hennequin: Lying Ketty (1966)
- Mikhail Bulgakov: The Purple Island (1967)
- Brandon Thomas: Charley's Aunt (1969)

== Film and television roles, selection ==
- Lost Children (1956 film)
- Florenc 13.30 (1957)
- Pan Tau (1970 TV series)
- Burglar and Umbrella (1970 episode of The Sinful People of Prague)
- The Death of Black King (1971 episode of The Sinful People of Prague)
- The Star Falls Upward (1974)
- The Hic Party (1976)
- Poor Mr. Kufalt (1981)
- Adventures of Robinson Crusoe, a Sailor from York (1982)
- 30 Cases of Major Zeman

== Voice acting ==
One of the most sought-after Czech voice actors, he has lent his voice to Pierre Brice, who played Winnetou in the German 1960's western series, and Peter Sellers as Inspector Clouseau in the Pink Panther film series. He is also known for voice acting Paul Villagio in the comedies about the accountant Fantozzi, as well as the Asterix character in the French comix series.
