= Anna Proletářka =

1953 film by Karel Steklý

- East German poster
- Directed by: Karel Steklý
- Written by: Ivan Olbracht; Karel Steklý
- Based on: Anna Proletářka (1920) by Ivan Olbracht
- Starring: Marie Tomášová; Josef Bek; Jana Dítětová
- Cinematography: Rudolf Stahl
- Edited by: Jiřina Lukešová
- Music by: Jan Seidel
- Production company: Československý Státní Film
- Distributed by: Rozdělovna Filmu Československého Státního Filmu; Progress Film (East Germany)
- Release date: 20 February 1953
- Running time: 140 minutes
- Country: Czechoslovakia
- Language: Czech

Anna Proletářka (literally "Anna (The) Proletarian") is a 1953 Czechoslovak film based on the novel by Ivan Olbracht. The movie was filmed on location in Osek, and Prague. It was released on 20 February 1953. It describes proletarian life in the newly independent Czechoslovakia after World War I.

== Cast ==
- Marie Tomášová as Anna
- Josef Bek as Toník
- Jana Dítětová as Máňa
- Bořivoj Křístek as Bohouš
- Bedřich Karen as Rubeš
- Jarmila Májová as Rubešová
- Libuše Pospíšilová as Dadla
- Oldřich Velen as Dr. Houra
- Vítězslav Vejrazka as Jandák
- Saša Lichý as Jarouš
- Martin Růžek as Podhradský
- František Vnouček as Tusar
- Karel Máj as Habrman
- Theodor Pištěk as Němec
