= Komedianti =

1954 film

- Directed by: Vladimír Vlček
- Written by: Ivan Olbracht
- Starring: Jaroslav Vojta
- Cinematography: Rudolf Stahl
- Release date: 16 April 1954
- Running time: 95 minutes
- Country: Czechoslovakia
- Language: Czech

Komedianti is a 1954 Czech film directed by Vladimír Vlček. It was entered into the 1954 Cannes Film Festival.

== Cast ==
- Jaroslav Vojta - Starý komediant
- Ladislav Pešek - Zak
- Jaroslav Mareš - Fricek
- Alena Martinovská - Olga
- Marie Vásová - Reditelka cirkusu
- Gabriela Bártlová
- Svatopluk Beneš - Bohatý pán
- František Filipovský - Rychtár
- Josef Hlinomaz - Cop
- Rudolf Hrušínský - Havránek
- Vera Kalendová - Rychtárka
- František Klika - Cop
- Marie Nováková - Kalupinka
- Theodor Pištěk - Hospodský
- Josef Príhoda - Spectator in the Pub
- Libuše Zemková - Margit
