= Zdeněk Dítě =

Czech actor (1920–2001)

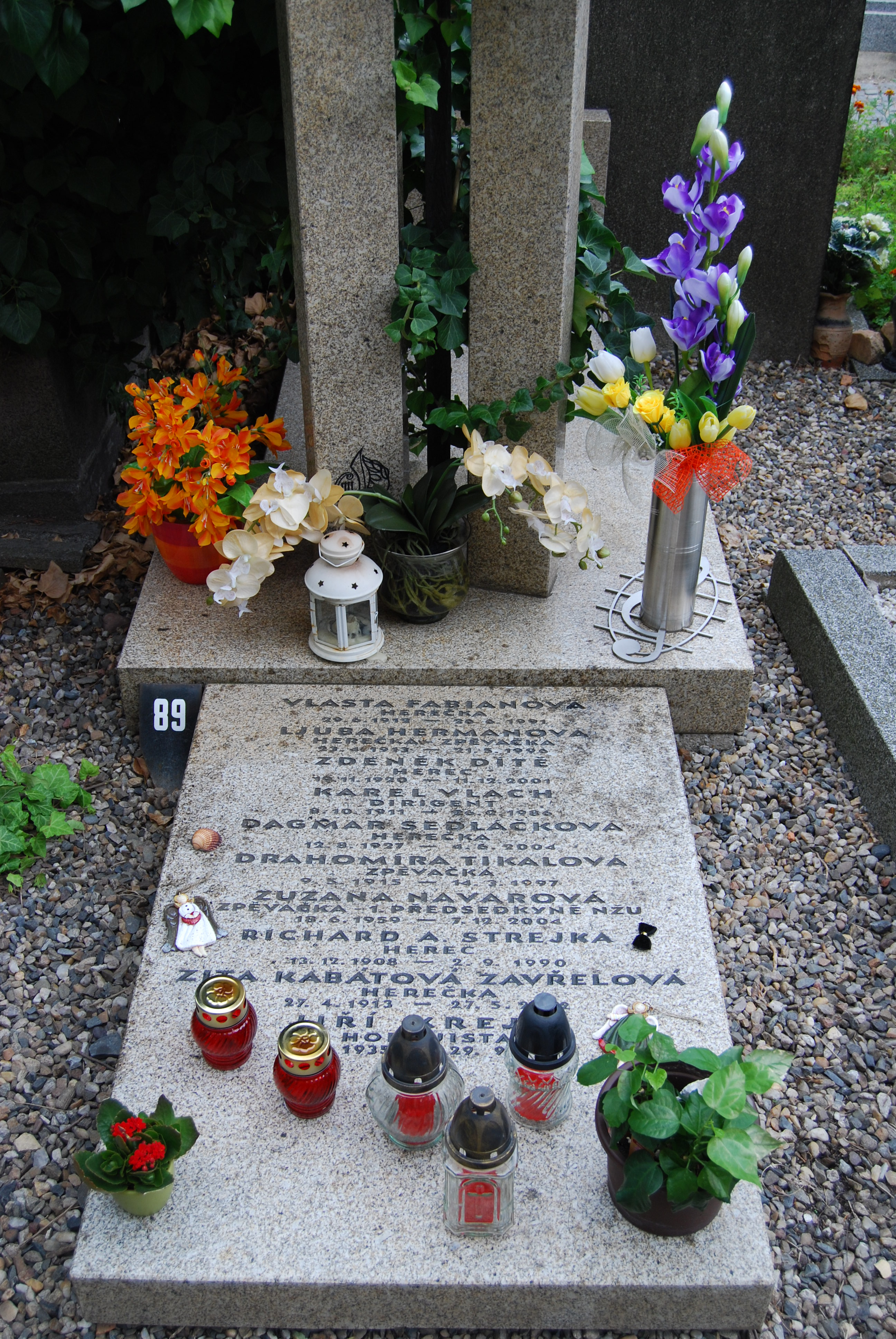
- Grave of Zdeněk Dítě at Vyšehrad Cemetery
- Born: 19 November 1920; Prague, Czechoslovakia
- Died: 11 December 2001 (aged 81); Kralupy nad Vltavou, Czech Republic
- Occupation: Actor
- Years active: 1944–1991

Zdeněk Dítě (19 November 1920 – 11 December 2001) was a Czech film actor. He appeared in more than 70 films and television shows between 1945 and 1991.

== Selected filmography ==
- The Wedding Ring (1944)
- Rozina, the Love Child (1945)
- The Heroes Are Silent (1946)
- A Kiss from the Stadium (1948)
- The Poacher's Foster Daughter or Noble Millionaire (1949)
- The Great Opportunity (1950)
- Divotvorný klobouk (1953)
- Tank Brigade (1955)
- May Stars (1959)
- Přísně tajné premiéry (1968)
- Světáci (1969)
- I Killed Einstein, Gentlemen (1970)
- The Death of Black King (1972)
- The Girl on the Broomstick (1972)
- Circus in the Circus (1975)
- Dinner for Adele (1978)
- The Divine Emma (1979)
- Calamity (1982)
- Forbidden Dreams (1986)
