= Josef Knap =

Czech poet and author (1900–1973)

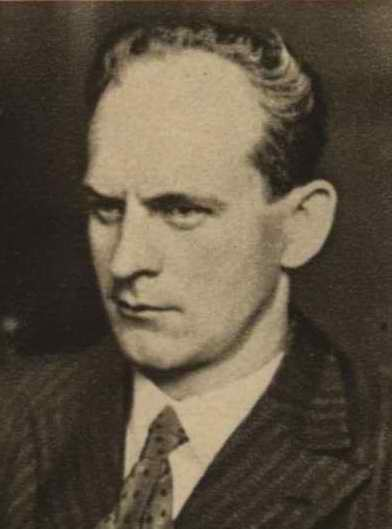
Josef Knap

Josef Knap (28 July 1900 – 13 December 1973) was a Czech writer, poet and literary critic.

== Biography ==
Born in Podůlší near Jičín, Knap studied at the Classical Grammar school until 1919. He graduated from the College of Philosophy at Charles University in Prague in 1924, with a degree in modern literature. During World War I and World War II, he traveled throughout Europe visiting countries including Germany, Sweden, Norway, Italy and France. From 1925 he worked in the theater department of the National Museum of Czechoslovakia. He stayed there until 1951, eventually becoming the museum's administrator. His time there was interrupted by the Nazi occupation of Czechoslovakia, which he spent in Arbeitsansatz.

Because of theological themes in his work, Knap became a victims of the political persecution of Catholic intellectuals by the Communist government in the 1950s. In 1952, he was condemned without any evidence to eleven years in prison, but was released early in 1955 (he was pardoned in 1967 during a brief period of political freedom). After his release he worked as a building laborer, and later in the Memorial of National Literature. In the 1960s, he focused on the history of theater groups. Based on his work in this area, he published Umělcové na pouti (Czech Traveling artists) in 1961.

Knap died in Prague and is buried in Železnice by Jičín. In 1997, his memoirs were published under the name Bez poslední kapitoly (Czech Without the last chapter).

== Works ==
Knap's writings combine realistic and impressionistic elements. His inspiration came from northern European authors and some Czech writers, above all Antal Stašek, Karel Václav Rais and the impressionist Fráňa Šrámek. He devoted his work to rural themes.

=== Short story collections ===
- Píseň na samotě (1924)
- Zaváté šlépěje (1929–1940)
- Žloutnou stráně (1929)
- Polní kytice, (1935)
- Trojlístek (1943)
- Čas kopřiv (1970)

=== Novels ===
- Ztracené jaro (1922)
- Réva na zdi (1926)
- Muži a hory (1928)
- Vysoké jarní nebe (1932)
- Cizinec (1934)
- Puszta (1937)
- Dívčí hlas (1938)
- Věno (1944)
- Dokud vane vítr (1968)
- Vzdálená země (1969)
- Bez poslední kapitoly (1997) (memoirs)

=== Professional works about theater ===
- Hilbert (1926)
- Zöllnerové: Dějiny divadelního rodu (1958)
- Umělcové na pouti: České divadelní společnosti v 19. století (1961)
- Čtyři herečky: Spurná, Vojtová, Brzková, Beníšková (1967)

=== Historical works ===
- Alej srdcí (1920) – debut book of essays concerning Czech postwar poetry
- Úvod do krásné literatury (1924)
- Cesty a vůdcové: k literatuře let dvacátých (1926)
- Básníci selství (1932)
- Fráňa Šrámek (1937)
- Literatura české půdy (1939)
- Selma Lagerlöfová (1949) – studies concerning this significant Swedish female author

=== Collections of poems ===
- Neznámému bohu (1929)
- Zaslechnutý hlas (1997) – verses from prison

== See also ==
- List of Czech writers
