= May Fairy Tale =

1940 film

- Directed by: Otakar Vávra
- Written by: Otakar Vávra
- Based on: Pohádka máje by Vilém Mrštík
- Starring: Svatopluk Beneš; Nataša Gollová
- Cinematography: Ferdinand Pečenka
- Edited by: Jan Kohout
- Music by: Jiří Srnka
- Production company: Elektafilm
- Distributed by: Elektafilm
- Release date: 25 October 1940
- Running time: 88 minutes
- Country: Czechoslovakia
- Language: Czech

May Fairy Tale (Czech: Pohádka máje) is a 1940 Czechoslovak drama film directed by Otakar Vávra.

== Cast ==
- Nataša Gollová as Helenka
- Jaroslav Vojta as Helena's father
- Leopolda Dostalová as Helena's aunt Marta
- Svatopluk Beneš as Ríša Gregor
- Theodor Pištěk as Ríša's father
- Marie Blažková as Ríša's mother
- Jaroslav Průcha as Priest
- Vlasta Fabianová as Landlady Křížová
