= Eduard Dubský =

Czech film actor

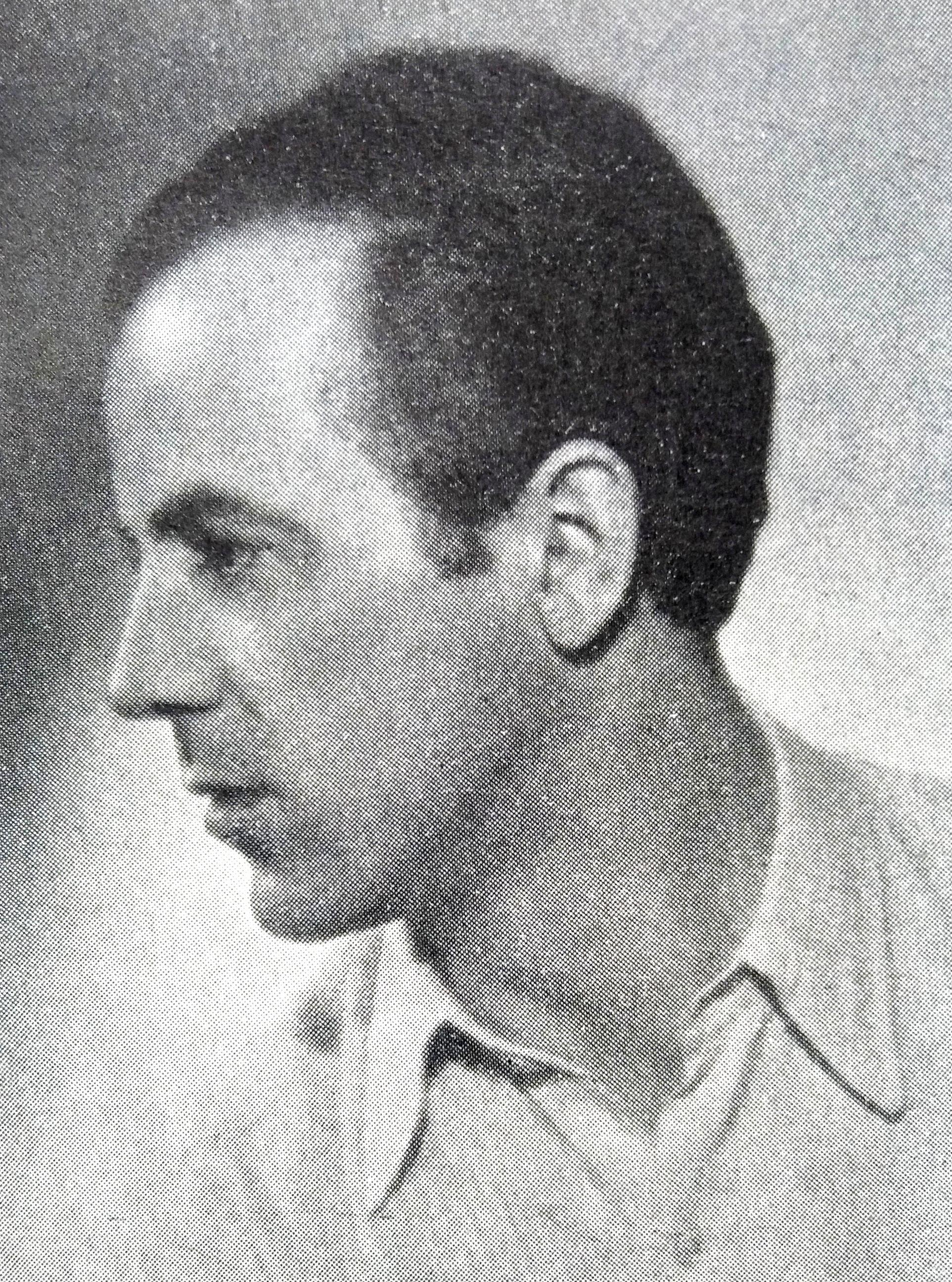
- Dubský in 1941
- Born: Eduard Neckář; 19 November 1911; Jihlava, Austria-Hungary
- Died: 2 March 1989 (aged 77); Prague, Czechoslovakia
- Occupation: Actor
- Years active: 1946–1980 (film)

Eduard Dubský (born as Eduard Neckář; 19 November 1911 – 2 March 1989) was a Czech actor. He acted in a variety of theatres around the country. Following the end of the occupation of Czechoslovakia he began acting in films in a mixture of lead and supporting roles.

== Selected filmography ==
- Men Without Wings (1946)
- Just Getting Started (1946)
- Don't You Know of an Unoccupied Flat? (1947)
- Čapek's Tales (1947)
- Až se vrátíš (1948)
- A Dead Man Among the Living (1949)
- Revoluční rok 1848 (1949)
- Malý partyzán (1950)
- Vítězná křídla (1951)
- Mikoláš Aleš (1952)
- Únos (1953)
- Nevěra (1956)
- Hroch (1974)
- Všichni proti všem (1977)

== Bibliography ==
- Bartošek, Luboš. Náš film: kapitoly z dějin, 1896-1945. Mladá fronta, 1985.
