= Vyšehrad (TV series) =

2022 Czech comedy film

- Genre: Comedy
- Written by: Tomáš Vávra
- Directed by: Jakub Štáfek; Martin Kopp; Jan Filip
- Starring: Jakub Štáfek
- Country of origin: Czech Republic
- Original language: Czech
- No. of seasons: 1
- No. of episodes: 10

Production
- Running time: 7-10 minutes

Original release
- Network: Obbod TV
- Release: 12 October 2016 – 7 June 2017

Related
- Vyšehrad: Fylm

Vyšehrad is a Czech web series by Obbod TV. It follows a talented footballer named Julius "Lavi" Lavický who gets kicked out of the Czech First League club AC Sparta Prague due to his bad behaviour and wild exterior. He is thus forced to play for FK Slavoj Vyšehrad.

== Cast ==
- Jakub Štáfek as Julius "Lavi" Lavický, FK Slavoj Vyšehrad team captain
- Jakub Prachař (episodes 1–5)/Jaromír Nosek (episodes 6–10) as Jarda Mizina, Lavi's agent
- Ondřej Pavelka as Pavel Král, FK Slavoj Vyšehrad Chairman
- Jiří Ployhar as Michal Žloutek, FK Slavoj Vyšehrad trainer
- Tomáš Měcháček as policeman
- Monika Timková as journalist
- Sandra Nováková as Lavi's girlfriend, prostitute
- Michaela Tomešová as Máša, janitor
- Šárka Krausová as Lucie, Jarda's sister and Lavi's girlfriend
- Martin Hofmann as bet mobster

== Production ==
Lavický stated that he was inspired by numerous footballers, including Mario Balotelli, David Limberský, Martin Fenin, or Milan Petržela. Some footballers also starred in the series, including Lukáš Vácha, Roman Bednář, Jan Rajnoch, and Radek Sňozík. The footballers of Vyšehrad are represented by real ones of Slavoj Vyšehrad.

The series has become popular that Lavický's collection of clothes JL10 was made. Actor Jakub Štáfek even got chance to play for the real third-league team Vyšehrad, but did not score a goal against FK Loko Vltavín.. From 29 June to 31 December 2018, the series was available on Stream.cz internet television. The series was followed by a sequel film Vyšehrad: Fylm.
