= The Good Soldier Schweik (1956 film) =

1956 Czechoslovak comedy film

- Directed by: Karel Steklý
- Written by: Karel Steklý
- Based on: The Good Soldier Švejk by Jaroslav Hašek
- Starring: Rudolf Hrušínský; František Filipovský; Svatopluk Beneš
- Cinematography: Rudolf Stahl Jr.
- Edited by: Miroslav Hájek
- Music by: Jan Seidel
- Production company: Filmové studio Barrandov
- Distributed by: Ústřední půjčovna filmů
- Release date: August 23, 1957
- Running time: 110 minutes
- Country: Czechoslovakia
- Language: Czech

The Good Soldier Schweik (Czech: Dobrý voják Švejk) is a 1956 Czechoslovak anti-war comedy film written and directed by Karel Steklý. It was based on the novel The Good Soldier Švejk by Jaroslav Hašek and was nominated for the 1957 Crystal Globe Awards. It was followed by a 1957 sequel I Dutifully Report.

== Cast ==
- Rudolf Hrušínský as Josef Švejk
- František Filipovský as Agent Bretschneider
- Svatopluk Beneš as First lieutenant Lukáš
- Josef Hlinomaz as Innkeeper Palivec
- Miloš Kopecký as Chaplain Otto Katz
- Božena Havlíčková as Katy Wendlerová
- Eva Svobodová as Ms. Müllerová
- Felix Le Breux as Police council
