= Lost Children (1956 film) =

1957 film

- Film poster
- Directed by: Miloš Makovec
- Written by: Alois Jirásek; Jiří Brdečka; Miloš Makovec
- Starring: Stanislav Fišer
- Cinematography: Vladimír Novotný
- Release date: 1956
- Running time: 85 minutes
- Country: Czechoslovakia
- Language: Czech

Lost Children (Czech: Ztracenci) is a 1956 Czechoslovak historical drama anti-war film directed by Miloš Makovec and based on Jiří Brdečka's adaptation of a short story by Alois Jirásek. The film was screened in the main competition section of the 1957 Cannes Film Festival.

== Plot ==
During a war between Austria and Prussia, three soldiers desert their units after being defeated by the Prussian army and find the shelter in a lonely farmhouse. They do not share the pacifist belief of the farmer, but they also do not want to fight anymore. After the farm house is attacked by plundering Prussian hussars, the three soldiers decide to fight and eventually die, not for glory or money or their empress, but for innocent people.

== Cast ==
- Stanislav Fišer as The infantryman
- Vladimír Hlavatý as The hussar
- Gustáv Valach as The cuirassier
- Ladislav Gzela as Zieten Hussar #1
- Vladimír Klemens as Zieten Hussar #2
- Radovan Lukavský as Jíra (farmer)
- Alena Vránová as Baruška
