= Jana Andrsová =

Czech ballerina and actress (1939–2023)

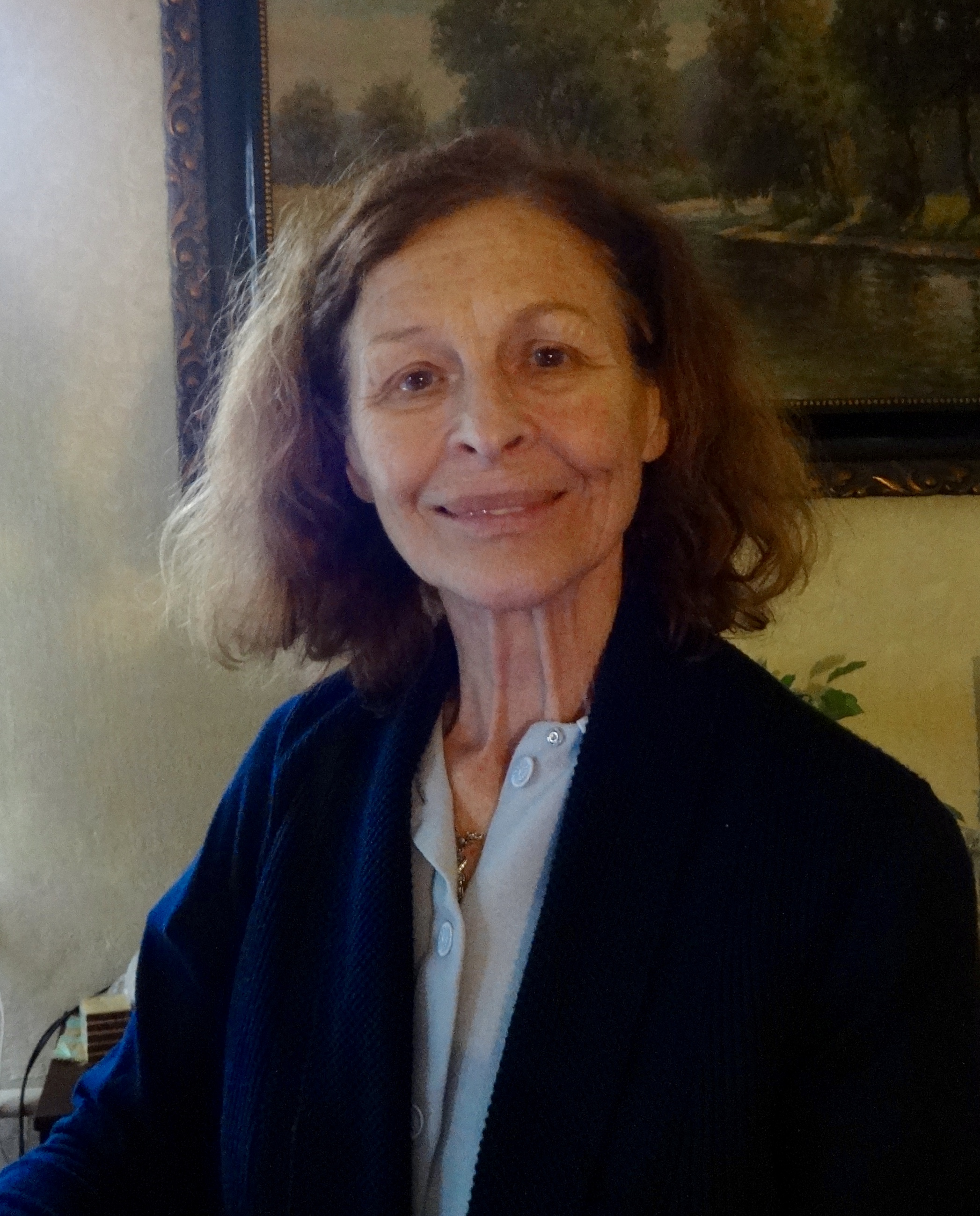
- Andrsová in 2016 (Note: Andrsová makes an appearance in the Sonja Vectomov music video "Two in One," directed by Mika Johnson.)
- Born: 8 August 1939; Prague, Protectorate of Bohemia and Moravia (now Czech Republic)
- Died: 16 February 2023 (aged 83); Prague, Czech Republic
- Education: Dance Conservatory in Prague
- Occupations: Actress, ballerina
- Spouse: Saša Večtomov (m. 1964–1989, his death)
- Children: 3

Jana Andrsová (Večtomová; 8 August 1939 – 16 February 2023) was a Czech ballerina and actress. In 1957 she graduated from the Dance Conservatory in Prague and began to work with the Vitus Nejedly Army Art Ensemble.

== Laterna Magika ==
From 1959 to 1978, Andrsová worked with Josef Svoboda's avant-garde multimedia company Laterna Magika, initially as a chorus girl and later (beginning in 1973) as a prima ballerina. In Allen Hughes' review of the company's August 1964 Carnegie Hall debut of a presentation that gave 23 performances at that venue under the direction of Miloš Forman, they are described as "a Czech theatrical spectacle that first came to international attention at the Brussels World's Fair." (Note: "Laterna Magika is not a simple affair," Hughes continues by way of introduction. "It combines motion pictures, stereophonic sound and live performers in so elaborate a way that a considerable amount of construction has had to be done in Carnegie Hall to make it work. The stage has been extended and built up with a series of platforms and steps shrouded in black velvet hangings, and several boxes in the back of the auditorium have been made into rooms containing projection equipment. At one point, a small instrumental ensemble plays from a side location in one of the seating tiers.") In 1966 Andrsová starred in Alfréd Radok's choreographed multimedia production Laterna Magika: Variation 66, The Opening of the Wells, cowritten by Forman in collaboration with Jan Švankmajer.

== Retirement and death ==
In retirement, Andrsová continued to make stage appearances. In 2014 (also a 2016 reprise) she performed as elderly virtuous heroine Madame de Rosemonde in the National Theatre Ballet world premiere production of Valmont, choreographer Libor Vaculík's adaptation of Les Liaisons dangereuses.

Andrsová died on 16 February 2023, at the age of 83.

== Filmography ==
- Strakonický dudák (1955) – wood nymph
- Jak se Franta naučil bát (1959) – miller's daughter Veronika
- Rusalka (1962) – Rusalka (part sung by Milada Šubrtová)
- Hoffmannovy povídky (1962) – Olympia
- Dvanáctého (1963) – dancer
- Svět je báječné místo k narození (1968) – herself
- Bludiště moci (1969) – ballerina
- Kočičí princ (1978) – mother
