= Všichni proti všem =

1977 film

- Directed by: Karel Steklý
- Written by: Karel Steklý
- Starring: Vladimír Šmeral
- Edited by: Jaromír Janácek
- Release date: 1977
- Running time: 87 minutes
- Country: Czechoslovakia
- Language: Czech

Všichni proti všem (in English, All Against All) is a 1977 Czechoslovak comedy film directed by Karel Steklý.

== Cast ==
- Vladimír Šmeral as Prusík
- Eduard Dubský as Father F. X. Ostatek
- Jiřina Bohdalová as Hermína Metelková, a Prusík's daughter
- Vladimír Ráž as JUDr. Jindřich Metelka, Hermína's husband
- Stanislava Bartošová as Olga, Prusík's daughter
- Josef Vinklář as Fredy Dedera, Olga's husband
- Kateřina Macháčková as Zuzana
- Břetislav Slováček as Michal
