= A Kiss from the Stadium =

1948 film

- Film poster
- Directed by: Martin Frič
- Written by: Martin Frič; František Vlček; Frank Wenig
- Starring: Zdeněk Dítě
- Cinematography: Jan Roth
- Edited by: Jan Kohout
- Music by: Eman Fiala
- Release date: 6 February 1948
- Running time: 76 minutes
- Country: Czechoslovakia
- Language: Czech

A Kiss from the Stadium (Czech: Polibek ze stadionu) is a 1948 Czech comedy film directed by Martin Frič.

== Cast ==
- Zdeněk Dítě as Jan Vaněček
- Jana Dítětová as Věra Fabiánová
- Svatopluk Beneš as Oldřich Janota
- Eman Fiala as Malík, accountant
- Irena Bernátová as Lídia Jonášová
- Marie Grossová as Ema Jonášová
- Oldřich Dědek as Kubiš, shop manager
- Josef Laufer
- Otakar Procházka
- Stefan Maslonka
- Jára Kohout
- Milena Spálená
- Ella Nollová
- George Pravda
