= Babičky dobíjejte přesně! =

- Directed by: Ladislav Rychman
- Written by: Jirí Just; Ladislav Rychman
- Starring: Jiří Lábus
- Cinematography: Antonín Holub
- Edited by: Miroslav Hájek
- Release date: 1 June 1984
- Running time: 101 minutes
- Country: Czechoslovakia
- Language: Czech

Babičky dobíjejte přesně! ("Recharge Grandmothers Precisely!") is a 1984 Czechoslovak comedy science fiction film directed by Ladislav Rychman.

== Cast ==
- Jiří Lábus - Mr. Louda
- Daniela Kolářová - Mrs. Loudová (as Dana Kolárová)
- Libuše Havelková - Róza 350 GLS
- Jana Dítětová - Carmen - robotic grandmother
- Katka Urbancová - Alenka Loudová
- Piotr Frolik - Bertík Louda
- Antonín Hardt - Mr. Pálek
- Marie Málková - Mrs. Pálková
- Michal Rynes - Adam
- Dana Balounová - Sreinerová
- Viktor Vrabec - Operative of the fy BIOTEX
- Karel Chromík - Head of the fy BIOTEX
- Jarmila Smejkalová - Grandmother Loudová

== Plot ==
Since their neighbors the Carmens have an android grandma to help tutor the children and maintain the household, the Loudova family must acquire a more advanced model android grandma. The "grandmas" get into an escalating rivalry which becomes comically horrifying.
