= Lucie (1963 film) =

- Directed by: Karel Steklý
- Starring: Josef Bek
- Release date: 1963
- Running time: 90 minutes
- Country: Czechoslovakia
- Language: Czech

Lucie is a 1963 Czechoslovak film directed by Karel Steklý. The film starred Josef Kemr.

== Cast ==
- Josef Bek
- Karel Höger
- Václav Kankovský
- Waldemar Matuška
- Július Vasek
