= Konec cesty =

- Directed by: Miroslav Cikán
- Starring: Martin Růžek, Alena Vránová, and Vladimír Ráž.
- Cinematography: Václav Hunka
- Edited by: Eliska Svarcová, Antonín Zelenka
- Music by: Stepán Lucký
- Production company: Filmové studio Barrandov
- Release date: 1959
- Running time: 80 minutes
- Country: Czechoslovakia

Konec cesty is a 1959 Czechoslovak crime drama film, directed by Miroslav Cikán. It stars Martin Růžek, Alena Vránová, and Vladimír Ráž.

== Cast ==
- Martin Růžek as Josef Lachman
- Alena Vránová as Eva Kostková
- Vladimír Ráž as Jindra Kostka
- Rudolf Deyl as Rokos
- Eva Klepácová as Ruzena
- Josef Bek as kapitán Lukes
- Gustav Heverle as porucík Bouchal
- Oldrich Vykypel as porucík Novák
- Frantisek Miska as porucík Hanák
- Miloš Kopecký as Jirák
