= The Strakonice Bagpiper =

1955 film

- Directed by: Karel Steklý
- Written by: Josef Kajetán Tyl
- Starring: Josef Bek
- Edited by: Miroslav Hájek
- Release date: 1955
- Running time: 116 minutes
- Country: Czechoslovakia
- Language: Czech

The Strakonice Bagpiper (Czech: Strakonický dudák) is a 1955 Czechoslovak drama film directed by Karel Steklý.

== Cast ==
- Jana Andrsová
- Josef Bek
- Vlasta Fabianová as Nymph Rosava
- Květa Fialová
- Josef Hlinomaz as Mikuli
- Rudolf Hrušínský
- Stanislav Langer
- Josef Mixa as Bagpiper Švanda
- Marie Tomášová
- Vítězslav Vejražka
