= Temno =

Temno may refer to:

- Temno (film), a 1950 Czechoslovak drama film
- Temno (novel), a 1915 Czech novel by Alois Jirásek
