= Slávka Budínová =

Czech actress

- Born: 21 April 1924; Ostrava, Czechoslovakia
- Died: 31 July 2002 (aged 78); Prague, Czech Republic
- Occupation: Actress
- Years active: 1953 - 1999

Slávka Budínová (21 April 1924 – 31 July 2002) was a Czech film actress. She appeared in over 60 films and television shows between 1953 and 1999.

== Selected filmography ==
- The Flood (1958)
- Lidé z maringotek (1966)
- The Tricky Game of Love (1971)
- Svět otevřený náhodám (1971)
- Noc na Karlštejně (1973)
- Hroch (1973)
- My Brother Has a Cute Brother (1975)
- Tomorrow I'll Wake Up and Scald Myself with Tea (1977)
