= Průlom =

1946 film

- Directed by: Karel Steklý
- Written by: Jan Morávek; Karel Steklý
- Starring: Jindřich Plachta
- Release date: 4 June 1946
- Running time: 93 minutes
- Country: Czechoslovakia
- Language: Czech

Průlom is a 1946 Czechoslovak drama film directed by Karel Steklý.

== Cast ==
- Jindřich Plachta as Matej Domazlík - shoemaker
- Ella Nollová as Marjánka Domazlíková
- Jan Pivec as Vojta Domazlík
- Theodor Pištěk as Portreeve Trachta
- Jaroslav Marvan as Václav Dudácek
- Jirí Plachý as Viceregent
- Gustav Hilmar as Kleps - Farmer / 1st councillor
- Marie Blazková as Klep's Wife
- Jana Romanová as Milka - Klep's daughter
- Svatopluk Beneš as Kandler - City Manager
