= The Fabulous Baron Munchausen =

- Japanese DVD cover
- Directed by: Karel Zeman
- Written by: Karel Zeman; Josef Kainar; Jiří Brdečka
- Starring: Miloš Kopecký; Jana Brejchová; Rudolf Jelínek
- Cinematography: Jiří Tarantík
- Edited by: Věra Kutilová
- Music by: Zdeněk Liška
- Release date: 21 September 1962
- Running time: 85 minutes
- Country: Czechoslovakia
- Language: Czech
- Box office: 4.7 million KČs; ($14.2 million)

The Fabulous Baron Munchausen (Czech: Baron Prášil) is a 1962 Czechoslovak New Wave experimental surrealist romantic adventure fantasy film directed by Karel Zeman, based on the tales about Baron Munchausen. The film combines live-action with various forms of animation and is highly stylized, often evoking the engravings of Gustave Doré.

A digital restoration of the film premiered on 5 September 2016 at the Telluride Film Festival in the United States.

== Plot ==
The film begins with footsteps leading to a pond. The camera continually moves upwards to show the flight of butterflies, birds, and a progression of historical aircraft ending with a rocket ship travelling through space and landing on the Moon.

The astronaut/cosmonaut leaves his spacecraft and sights other footsteps on the Moon leading him to an old phonograph, then a crashed rocket with a plaque reading Jules Verne's From the Earth to the Moon. Taken to a dinner table, the surprised space traveller meets the characters from Verne's book, as well as two other figures associated with fictional Moon voyages: Cyrano de Bergerac and Baron Munchausen. Inviting him to their table, the characters believe that the cosmonaut is a man actually from the Moon, and kindly treat him as a small child.

The Baron decides to take him to Earth in a fanciful airship held up by a herd of winged horses. The Baron dresses the spaceman, called "Tony" in the English dubbed version and "Tonik" in the original Czech, in 18th-century costume where they land in the 18th-century Ottoman Empire, in Constantinople. Speaking in an unintelligible voice that he calls the "language of diplomacy", the Baron presents Tonik to the Sultan. However, Tonik's lack of knowledge of diplomatic protocol and his falling in love with Princess Bianca, a damsel in distress held prisoner by the Sultan, leads to a series of romantic and fanciful adventures that transform the modern scientific space traveller into a hero rivalling the Baron.

Among the exciting and satiric adventures are sword and sea battles with the Turks, being swallowed by a giant fish, and ending the conflict between two warring kingdoms.

== Cast ==
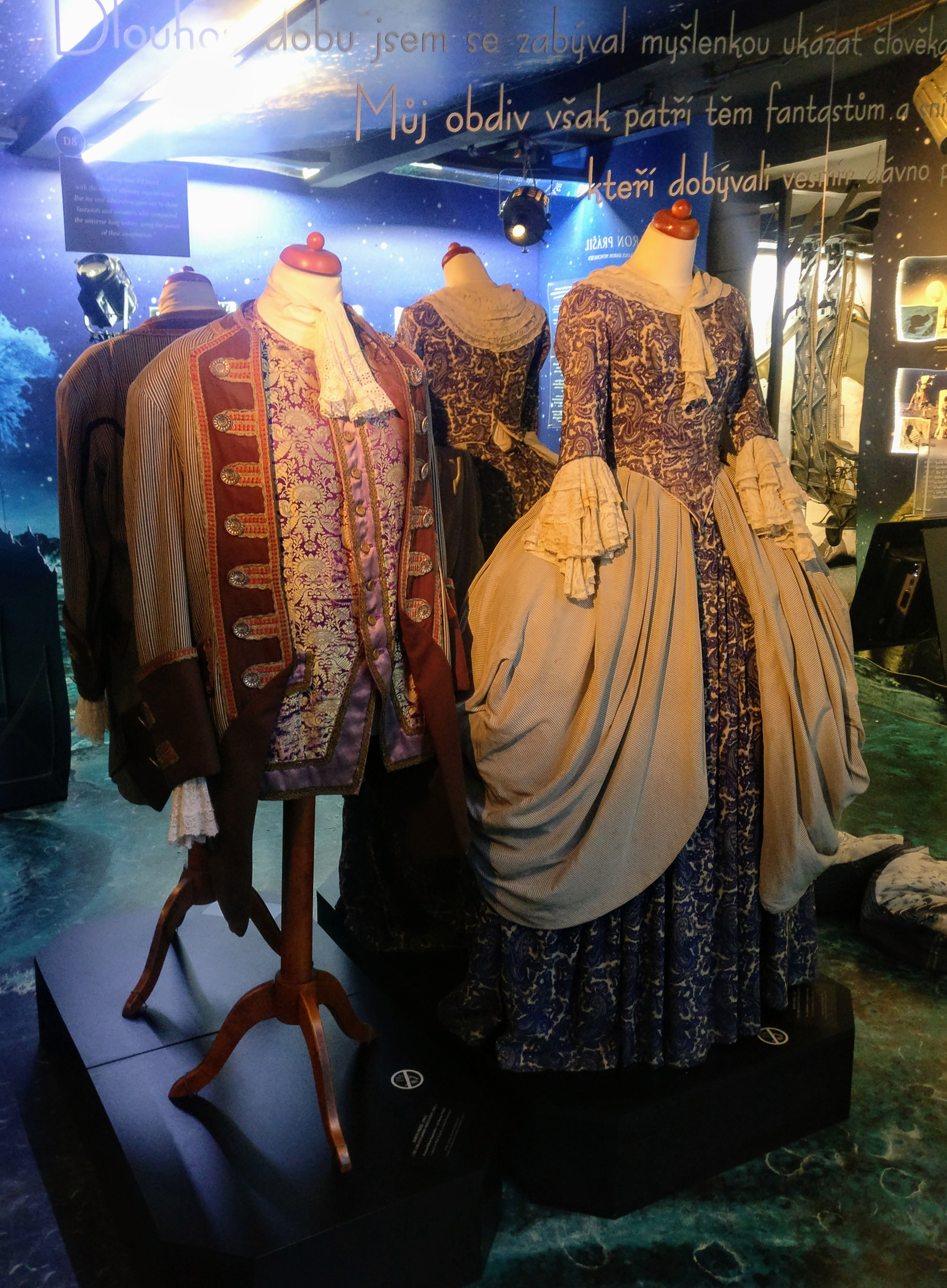
Costumes of Miloš Kopecký and Jana Brejchová

- Miloš Kopecký as Baron Munchausen
- Jana Brejchová as Princess Bianca
- Rudolf Jelínek as Tonik
- Karel Höger as Cyrano de Bergerac
- Eduard Kohout as General Ellemerle
- Jan Werich as Ship's Captain
- Bohuš Záhorský as Admiral
- Rudolf Hrušínský as The Sultan
- Miloslav Holub as Enemy General
- František Šlégr as Pirate Captain
- Karel Effa as Adjutant
- Josef Hlinomaz as Spanish General
- Zdeněk Hodr as Captain Nicholl
- Richard Záhorský as Impey Barbicane
- Otto Šimánek as Michel Ardan
- Miroslav Homola as Chess Player
- Václav Trégl as Sailor
- Naděžda Blažíčková as Court Dancer

== Reception ==
The film was released internationally throughout the 1960s, including a 1964 American dub under the title The Fabulous Baron Munchausen.

Howard Thompson of The New York Times described it as "a delectable oddity with a perky, intriguing music track," and writer Harlan Ellison termed it a "charming and sweethearted 1961 Czech fantasy filled with loopy special effects."

César Santos Fontenla of Triunfo called the film "a masterpiece" and added: "the film is undoubtedly the most exciting experiment so far in animation and in combining different techniques ... The Méliès influence is present throughout the film, which reaches the same level of poetry as the works of that old master." Le Monde's film blog called Zeman's technique "perfectly fitted" (parfaitement adaptée) to the Baron Munchausen stories, and described the result as "endowed with a splendid sense of humor and very inventive" (doté d’un bel humour et très inventif). The film historian Peter Hames described Baron Prášil as "perhaps [Zeman's] finest film."

When the film was screened at the British Film Institute in the 1980s, it served as an influence for Terry Gilliam, who was then making his own version of the Munchausen stories, The Adventures of Baron Munchausen. According to Gilliam:

I remember when I was doing Baron Munchausen seeing a picture in a [British Film Institute] catalogue from Karel Zeman's Baron Munchausen and saying, "Wow, what is this?" and eventually seeing the film, and saying, "Wow, that's great," because he did what I'm still trying to do, which is to try and combine live action with animation. His Doré-esque backgrounds were wonderful. The film captured the real spirit of the character.

British magazine Home Cinema Choice voted The Fabulous Baron Munchausen the best digitally restored film of 2017, defeating such films as The Thing, The Wages of Fear and Mulholland Drive.

The restored version of the film is about seven minutes shorter and omits 27 scenes compared to the original footage.
