= Podůlší =

- Municipality
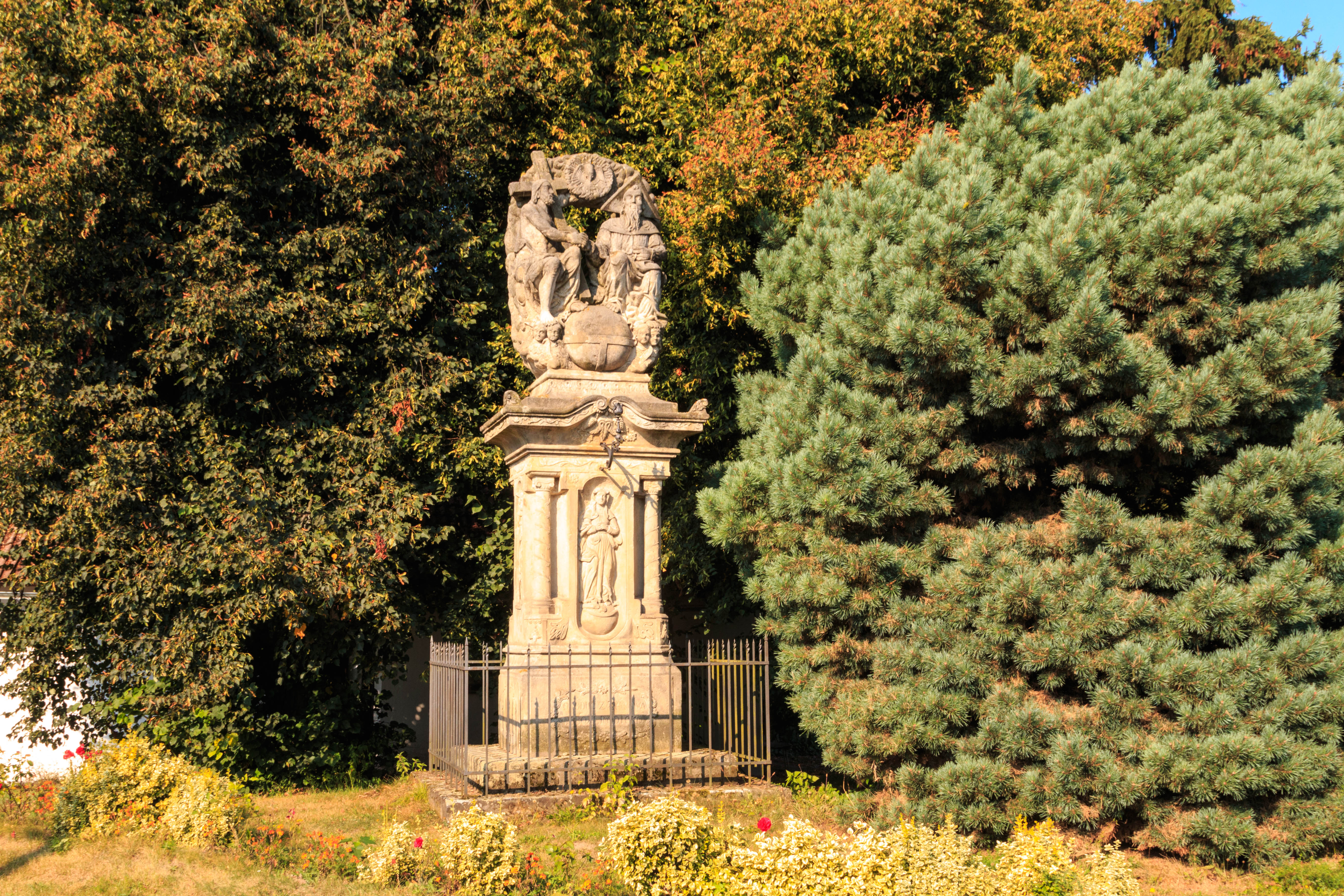
- Holy Trinity column

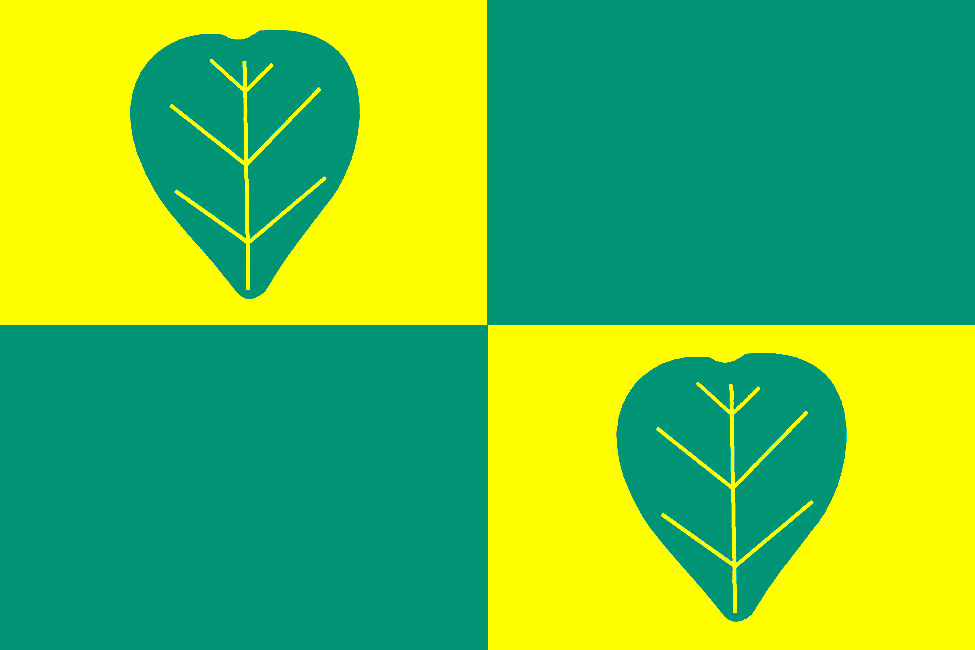
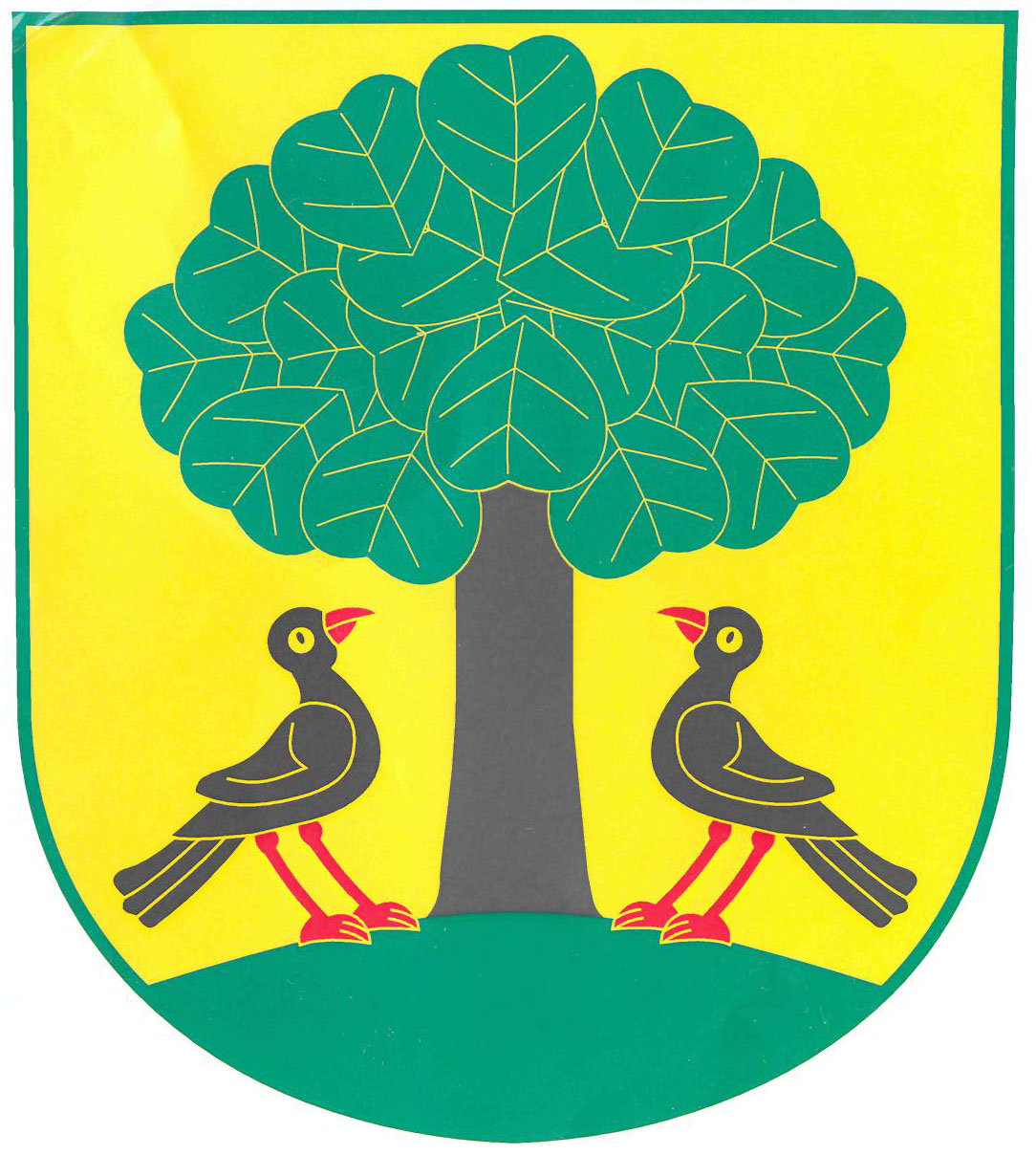
- Flag Coat of arms

- Location in the Czech Republic
- Coordinates: 50°28′8″N 15°20′26″E
- Country: Czech Republic
- Region: Hradec Králové
- District: Jičín
- First mentioned: 1399

Area
  - Total: 1.38 km^{2} (0.53 sq mi)
- Elevation: 345 m (1,132 ft)

Population (2026-01-01)
  - Total: 237
  - Density: 172/km^{2} (445/sq mi)
- Time zone: UTC+1 (CET)
  - Summer (DST): UTC+2 (CEST)
- Postal code: 506 01
- Website: podulsi.cz

Podůlší is a municipality and village in Jičín District in the Hradec Králové Region of the Czech Republic. It has about 200 inhabitants.

== Demographics ==
Historical population
Year	Pop.	±%
1869	297	—
1880	249	−16.2%
1890	246	−1.2%
1900	221	−10.2%
1910	202	−8.6%
1921	188	−6.9%
1930	177	−5.9%
1950	140	−20.9%
1961	137	−2.1%
1970	117	−14.6%
1980	124	+6.0%
1991	171	+37.9%
2001	241	+40.9%
2011	255	+5.8%
2021	237	−7.1%
Source: Censuses

== Notable people ==
- Josef Knap (1900–1973), writer and poet
- Josef Vinklář (1930–2007), actor
