= Monkey's Playtime =

1978 Czechoslovak film

Monkey's Playtime (Czech: Hop – a je tu lidoop) is a 1978 Czechoslovak film, directed by Milan Muchna and starring Josef Kemr.

== Cast ==
- Josef Kemr as Genie
- Josef Vinklář as Butcher Turecek
- Vladimír Dlouhý as Ondra
- Otakar Brousek Jr. as Viktor Merta
- Monika Hálová as Blanka
- Miroslav Šimek as teacher
