= Jiří Marek =

Jiří Marek (Josef Jiří Puchwein) (30 May 1914, in Prague – 10 December 1994, in Prague) was a Czech writer, educator, journalist and screenwriter. In 1965 he was a member of the jury at the 4th Moscow International Film Festival.

== Books ==
- Pečeť věrnosti (1944)
- Vstup do strany (1952)
- Pionýr Feďa (1953)
- Střelnice (1962)
- Blažený věk (1968)
- Můj strýc Odysseus (1974)
- Muži jdou v tmě (1946)
- Vesnice pod zemí (1949)
- Pohádky vzhůru nohama (1958)
- Autopohádky ("Car Fairy Tales") (1965)
  - From The Princess Who Never Smiled in Marek's car world: "Once upon the time there lived three Kings: King of petroleum, King of gasoline, and automobile King..." His Petroleumness had a princess who never smiled. The hero of the story is Vendelín the Car Mechanic whose car had all superb equipment, "not to say about pedestrian catcher".
  - In 1983 a German comedy film Car Fairy Tales based on the stories was produced by Erwin Stranka
  - In 2004 the band Chinaski with the participation of Jiří Lábus and Lucie Bílá released a double audio CD, Autopohádky with three fairy tales, and 8 songs
  - In 2011, a CD with 4 animated films was released, with three based on the original Marek's stories, the fourth being a new one. Music is by Chinaski and the narrator is Michal Malátný, the frontman of Chinaski.
- Panoptikum starých kriminálních příběhů (1968)
- Panoptikum hříšných lidí (1971)
- Panoptikum Města pražského (1979)
- OK 096 se nehlásí (1979)
- Sůl země 1, 2 (1981)
- Psí hvězda Sirius aneb láskyplné vyprávěnky o psech (1982)
- Tristan aneb O lásce (1985)
- Čas lásky a nenávisti (1986)

== Filmography ==
- The Sinful People of Prague
- Panoptikum města pražského.
