= Vlasta Fabianová =

Czech actress (1912–1991)

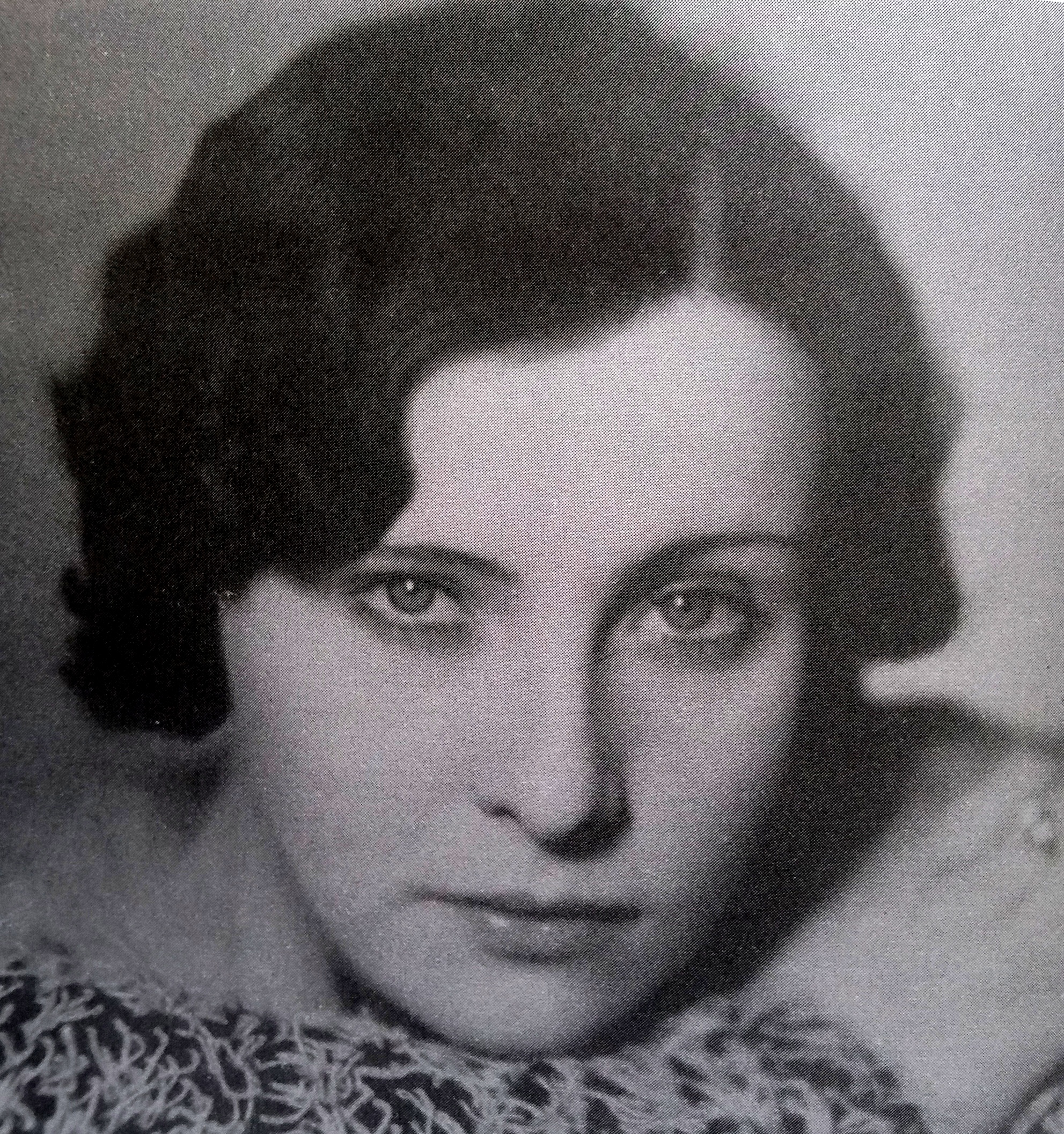
- Fabianová in 1930
- Born: 29 June 1912; Lemberg, Austria-Hungary
- Died: 26 June 1991 (aged 78); Prague, Czechoslovakia
- Occupation: Actress
- Years active: 1940–1989

Vlasta Fabianová (29 June 1912 – 26 June 1991) was a Czech film actress. She appeared in more than 30 films between 1940 and 1989.

== Selected filmography ==
- Second Tour (1940)
- Pohádka máje (1940)
- The Dancer (1943)
- The Wedding Ring (1944)
- Sign of the Anchor (1947)
- Bohemian Rapture (1947)
- Krakatit (1948)
- Nástup (1953)
- The Strakonice Bagpiper (1955)
- The Phantom of Morrisville (1966)
- Those Wonderful Movie Cranks (1978)
- The Salt Prince (1982)
