= Vítězná křídla =

1950 film

Vítězná křídla is a Czech drama film. directed by Cenek Duba and written by Jirí Marek. starring Rudolf Krivánek, Jirí Adamíra, and Eduard Dubský. It was released in 1950.
