= Za volantem nepřítel =

1974 film

- Directed by: Karel Steklý
- Written by: Miroslav Müller
- Starring: Milos Willig
- Edited by: Jaromír Janácek
- Release date: 1974
- Running time: 93 minutes
- Country: Czechoslovakia
- Language: Czech

Za volantem nepřítel is a 1974 Czechoslovak drama film directed by Karel Steklý.

== Cast ==
- Zdenka Burdová
- Antonín Hardt
- Jirí Havel
- Josef Hlinomaz as Driver
- Ladislav Krecmer
- Petr Pospíchal
- Libuše Řídelová as Mudroch's Wife
- Regina Rázlová as Zdena
- Petr Skarke as Chalus
- Frantisek Skripek as Milan
- Jarmila Svehlová
- Miloš Willig as Mudroch
