= Steel Town (1950 film) =

- Directed by: Martin Frič
- Written by: Otakar Kirchner
- Starring: Oldřich Lukeš
- Cinematography: Jaroslav Tuzar
- Edited by: Jan Kohout
- Release date: 1950
- Running time: 85 minutes
- Country: Czechoslovakia
- Language: Czech

Steel Town (Czech: Zocelení) is a Czech drama film directed by Martin Frič. It was released in 1950.

== Cast ==
- Oldřich Lukeš as Franta
- Josef Chvalina as Starek
- Jana Dítětová as Marie
- Jaroslav Mareš as Jan
- František Kovárík as Kolarik
- Marta Fricová as Secretary
- Jindra Hermanová as German Woman
- František Klika as Trade Unionist
- Stanislav Langer as Jauris
- Marie Nademlejnská
- Zdenek Savrda
