= Svatopluk Beneš =

Czech actor

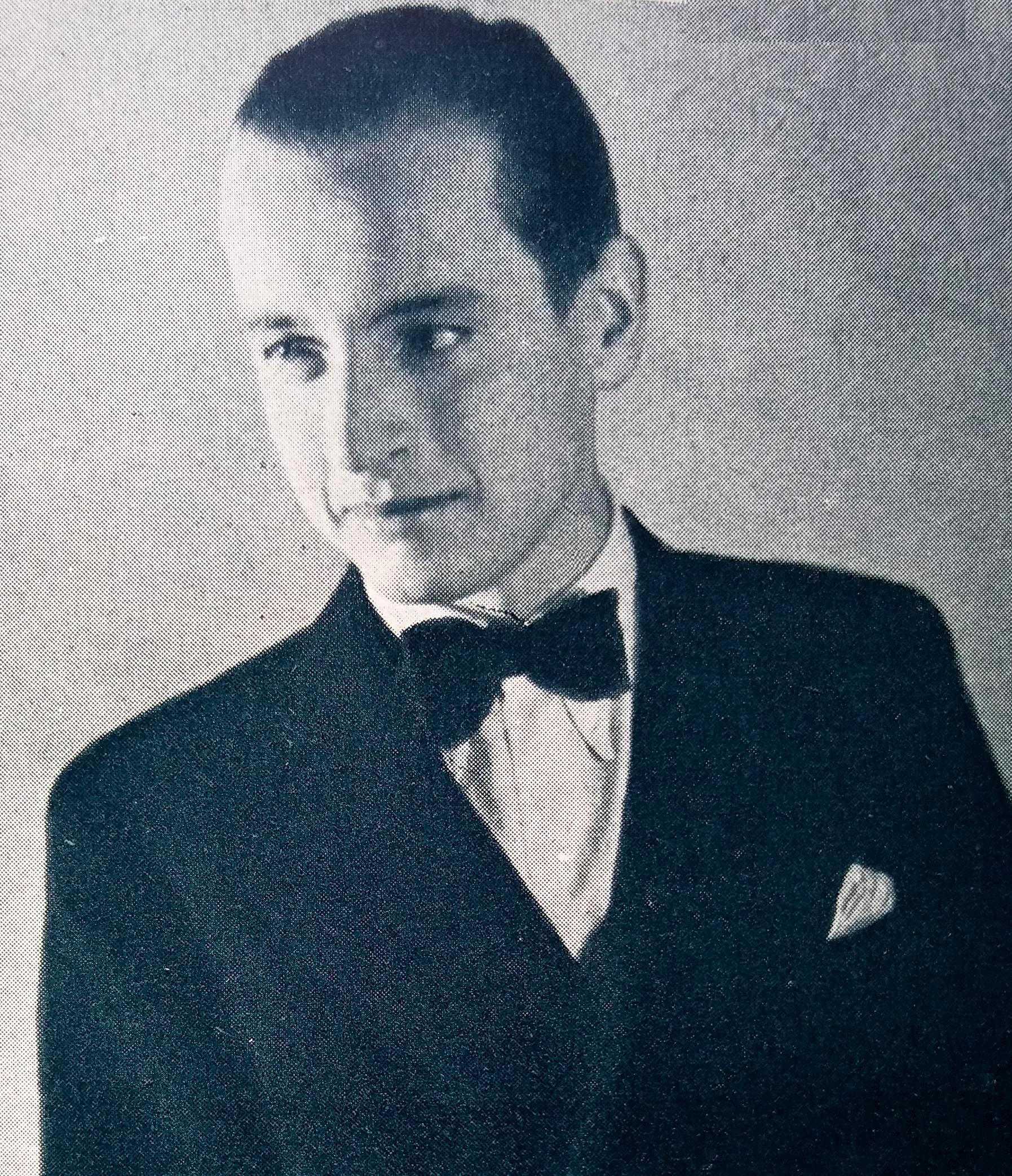
- Born: 24 February 1918; Roudnice nad Labem, Bohemia, Austria-Hungary
- Died: 27 April 2007 (aged 89); Prague, Czech Republic
- Occupation: Actor
- Years active: 1934–2003

Svatopluk Beneš (24 February 1918 – 27 April 2007) was a Czech film actor. He appeared in 90 films and television shows between 1934 and 2003.

== Selected filmography ==
- Pacientka Dr. Hegla (1940)
- Pohádka máje (1940)
- Ladies in Waiting (1940)
- Nocturnal Butterfly (1941)
- I'll Be Right Over (1942)
- Spring Song (1944)
- Průlom (1946)
- A Kiss from the Stadium (1948)
- The Secret of Blood (1953)
- Komedianti (1954)
- The Good Soldier Schweik (1956)
- I Dutifully Report (1958)
- Zítra vstanu a opařím se čajem (1977)
- Unterwegs nach Atlantis (1982, TV series)
