= The Sinful People of Prague =

Czechoslovak television series

- Genre: Drama
- Written by: Jiří Sequens; Jiří Marek
- Directed by: Jiří Sequens
- Country of origin: Czechoslovakia
- No. of episodes: 13

Production
- Running time: 50 minutes

Original release
- Release: 1968

Related
- Panoptikum města pražského

The Sinful People of Prague (Czech: Hříšní lidé města pražského) is a Czechoslovak television series which was first broadcast in 1968. The series was written and directed by Jiří Sequens. The thirteen-part series is an adaptation of Jiří Marek's short stories from the collections Panoptikum starých kriminálních příběhů (Panopticon of Old Criminal Stories) and Panoptikum hříšných lidí (Panopticon of Sinful People). The story takes place around 1928. The series was loosely followed by four feature films and one television film (all from 1971 to 1972) and the television series Panoptikum města pražského (1988).

== Plot ==
Police officers from Prague's "Čtyřka" ("The Fourth" or "The (Number) Four"), i.e. 4th Security Department, investigate serious criminal cases in Prague in the 1920s under the leadership of high police counsel Vacátko. The so-called "Murder Squad" consists of inspectors Mrázek, Bouše and Brůžek. They are experienced detectives and have extensive knowledge of the Prague underworld, which often meets in an infamous pub called "Jedová chýše" ("Poison hut"). Around 1928, they investigate murders, robberies, unexplained deaths and embezzlement, but also become involved in the case of stolen secret military documents.

== Cast ==
- Jaroslav Marvan as high police counsel Karel Vacátko
- František Filipovský as inspector Václav Mrázek
- Josef Vinklář as inspector Josef Bouše
- Josef Bláha as inspector Josef Brůžek
