= Spring Song (1944 film) =

- Directed by: Rudolf Hrušínský
- Written by: Josef Neuberg; Julius Schmitt; Marta Russová
- Produced by: Teddy Vilem Brož; Oldřich Papež
- Starring: Hana Vítová; Jarmila Smejkalová; František Smolík
- Cinematography: Karl Degl
- Edited by: Jan Kohout
- Music by: Jaroslav Křička
- Production company: Lucernafilm
- Distributed by: Lucernafilm
- Release date: 17 November 1944
- Country: Czechoslovakia
- Language: Czech

Spring Song (Czech: Jarní píseň) is a 1944 Czechoslovak film. The film starred Josef Kemr.

== Partial cast ==
- Hana Vítová as Jana Mirská-Sequencová
- Jarmila Smejkalová as Poldi
- František Smolík as MUDr. Sýkora
- Svatopluk Beneš as Franci Oborský
- Růžena Šlemrová as Hrabenka Oboronská
- Ema Kreutzerová as Paní Kautská
- Jaromíra Pačová as Baroness Gizela
- František Hanus as Petr Domin
- Pavla Vrbenská as Marenka
- Jindřich Plachta as lékárnik
- Marie Rýdlová as Kozlerka
- Jana Dítětová as Jana
