= Prosťáček =

1945 film

- Directed by: Karel Steklý
- Written by: Karel Steklý
- Produced by: Vaclav Drazl
- Starring: František Filipovský
- Release date: 1945
- Country: Czechoslovakia
- Language: Czech

Prosťáček is a 1945 Czechoslovak drama film directed by Karel Steklý.

== Cast ==
- František Filipovský as Tramp
- Vladimír Repa as Tramp - Thief
- Milada Smolíková as The lady of the house
- Nadezda Vladyková as Maid Barunka
- Bedrich Bozdech as Policeman
- Eliska Kucharová as Daughter Anicka
- Josef Pehr as Man in carnival dress
