= Josef Bek =

Czech film and television actor (1918–1995)

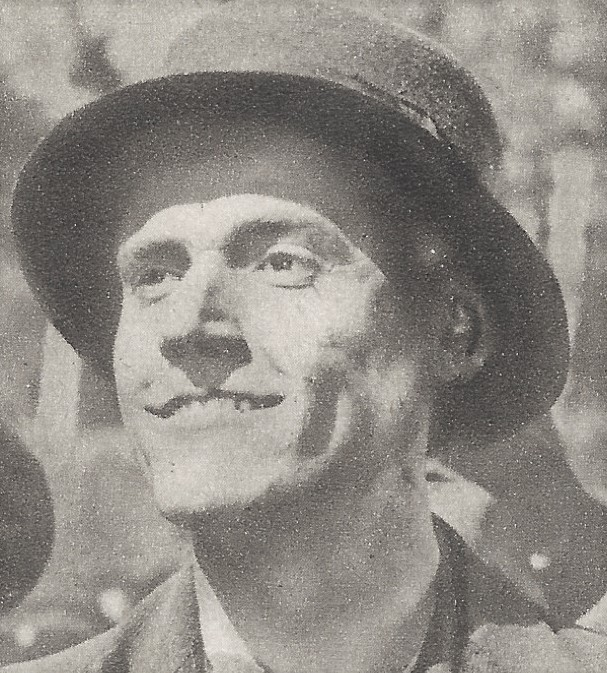
- Born: 21 December 1918; Hradec Králové, Czechoslovakia
- Died: 5 May 1995 (aged 76); Prague, Czech Republic
- Occupation: Actor
- Years active: 1929–1994 (film & TV)

Josef Bek (1918–1995) was a Czech film and television actor.

== Selected filmography ==
- Playing with the Devil (1945)
- The Strike (1947)
- Případ Z-8 (1948)
- Operation B (1952)
- Anna Proletářka (1953)
- The Strakonice Bagpiper (1955)
- Escape from the Shadows (1959)
- Konec cesty (1960)
- Lucie (1963)
- Svět otevřený náhodám (1971)
- Princess Goldilocks (1973)
