= Slovácko sa nesúdí =

- Starring: Jozef Kroner
- Country of origin: Czechoslovakia
- Original language: Czech
- No. of seasons: 2
- No. of episodes: 12

Production
- Running time: 31–43 minutes

Original release
- Network: Czechoslovak Television
- Release: 24 November 1976 – 17 August 1984

Slovácko sa nesúdí (transl. Moravian Slovakia Doesn't Judge) is a Czechoslovak comedy television series.

== Description ==
The show aired for two seasons, in 1976 and 1984. The series is set in Moravian Slovakia and based on local folklore. It is based on a book by Zdeněk Galuška called Slovácko sa súdí a nesúdí (Moravian Slovakia Does and Doesn't Judge). Galuška himself made a cameo in the series.

== Plot ==
The series shows humorous stories from a small Moravian Slovakia village. They are linked by actions of Matúš Pagač and his friend Jura Klásek.

== Cast ==
- Jozef Kroner as Matúš Pagač
- Oldřich Velen as Jura Klásek
- Jiří Lábus
- Stanislav Tříska
- Karel Augusta
- Svatopluk Skopal
- Zdeněk Kryzánek
- Terézia Hurbanová-Kronerová as Kača Pagáčová

== List of episodes ==
=== Season 1 (1976) ===
1. Parohy (premiered on 24 November 1976)
2. Polénko (premiered on 1 December 1976)
3. Nadílka (premiered on 8 December 1976)
4. Hody (premiered on 15 December 1976)
5. Divadlo (premiered on 22 December 1976)
6. Medicína (premiered on 29 December 1976)

=== Season 2 (1984) ===
1. Zabijačka (premiered on 18 January 1985)
2. Medvěd (premiered on 9 February 1985)
3. Hlt za tři krejcary (also known as Hlt za tři grajcary, premiered on 15 June 1985)
4. Janek Vyskoč, kozí vrah (also known as Janek Vyskoč, premiered on 13 July 1985)
5. Odplata (premiered on 10 August 1985)
6. Poslední vůle (also known as Poslední vúla, premiered on 17 August 1985)
