= DJ Wich =

Czech DJ & music producer (born 1978)

- Also known as: DJ Wich
- Born: Tomáš Pechlák; June 9, 1978 (age 48); Prague, Czechoslovakia
- Genre: Hip-hop
- Occupations: Record Producer, Disc Jockey
- Years active: 1993, 1998–present
- Label: Golden Touch

Tomáš Pechlák (born June 9, 1978 in Czechoslovakia), professionally known as DJ Wich, is a Czech deejay, record producer and audio engineer, who works on the Czech and Slovak hip hop scenes. He is a former member of Czech hip hop duo Indy & Wich together with Andreas "Indy" Christodoulou. He started DJing in 1998.

== Career ==
DJ Wich released his first solo album, Time Is Now, in 2004, the first producer album in Czech Republic.

In 2008, DJ Wich released his second solo album, The Golden Touch with international stars including Lil Wayne, Talib Kweli, M.O.P, and Kurupt.

DJ Wich created the soundtrack for the 2008 Czech movie Ulovit miliardáře.

His 2010 album Human Writes was a collaboration with Hi-Def.

In 2017 he released Veni, Vidi, Wich.

In 2019, he released JAKO RYBA VE VODĚ.

He has collaborated with Czech artists including Orion, Hugo Toxxx, Vladimir 518, LA4 and from the international Rasco, Rytmus, H16, Vec, and Nironic.

Wich streams live shows on DJ Wich Live TV with other rappers, live recording, interviews and chat.

In 2022, he was nominated for an Anděl Award for his rap music project together with Rest titled Tlak, but lost to 58G's City Park.

DJ Wich has created the soundtrack along with David Solar, Vojtaano and Jakub Děkan for the 2025 Czech movie Vyšehrad Dvje.

== Awards ==
- 2001 – Anděl Award – DJ of the year
- 2002 – Dance Music Awards – My3 – Best album of the year
- 2004 – Music awards of Óčko – Time Is Now – Best Hip Hop/RnB album of the year
- 2004, 2005, 2006, 2007, 2008 – Ladder Music Awards – DJ of the year

== Discography ==
- 2001 - Indy & Wich – Cesta Štrýtu
- 2002 - Indy & Wich – My3
- 2003 - Indy & Wich - Ještě pořád
- 2004 - DJ Wich – Time Is Now
- 2004 - DJ Wich – Work Affair Mixtape
- 2006 - Indy & Wich – Hádej Kdo…
- 2007 - DJ Wich presents Nironic: The Chronicles of a Nomad
- 2008 - DJ Wich – The Yearbook Mixtape
- 2008 - DJ Wich – The Golden Touch
- 2009 - Hi-Def & DJ Wich – Human Writes
- 2010 - DJ Wich & Rasco - The Untouchables: Al Capone's Vault
- 2011 - DJ Wich & Nironic - Nomad 2: The Long Way Home
- 2012 - DJ Wich & Ektor - Tetris
- 2014 - DJ Wich - Yearbook 2013
- 2014 - LA4 & DJ Wich - Panorama
- 2017 - DJ Wich - Veni, Vidi, Wich
- 2018 - Lvcas Dope & Dj Wich - Diamant
- 2019 - DJ Wich - JAKO RYBA VE VODĚ
- 2020 - Paulie Garand & Dj Wich - Mezi prsty
- 2021 - Maniak & DJ Wich – Černej Kůň
- 2022 - Rest & DJ Wich - Tlak
