= Karel Steklý =

Czech film director

- Born: 9 October 1903; Prague, Bohemia, Austria-Hungary
- Died: 5 July 1987 (aged 83); Prague, Czechoslovakia
- Occupation: Film director
- Years active: 1933–1981

Karel Steklý (9 October 1903 – 5 July 1987) was a Czech film director. He is most famous for his film Siréna (1947) for which he won the Golden Lion, and The Good Soldier Schweik (1957).

== Filmography ==
- Prosťáček (1945)
- Průlom (1946)
- Siréna (1947)
- Kariéra (1948)
- Old Ironside (1948)
- Soudný den (1949)
- Internacionála (1950)
- Temno (1950)
- Anna Proletářka (1953)
- Strakonický dudák (1955)
- The Good Soldier Schweik (1956)
- Poslušně hlásím (1957)
- Mstitel (1959)
- Objev na Střapaté hůrce (1962)
- Lucie (1963)
- Zkáza Jeruzaléma (1964)
- Slasti Otce vlasti (1969)
- Svatby pana Voka (1970)
- Svět otevřený náhodám (1971)
- Lupič Legenda (1972)
- Hroch (1973)
- Za volantem nepřítel (1974)
- Tam, kde hnízdí čápi (1975)
- Všichni proti všem (1977)
- Pan Vok odchází (1979)
- Hra o královnu (1980)
- Každému jeho nebe (1981)
- Příhody pana Příhody (1982)
- Podivná přátelství herce Jesenia (1986)
