= 2H+ =

Slovak hip hop group

- Origin: Bratislava, Slovakia
- Genres: Hip hop, rap rock
- Years active: 2001–present
- Members: Suvereno; Vladis; Deryck
- Past members: Cigo; Dj Skeptik
- Website: www.2hplus.sk

2H+ (sometimes 2Hplus or 2H-positive) is a Slovak hip hop group from Bratislava, formed in 2001.

== History ==
The band was formed around 2001 by Suvereno (then known as MCL), Cigo, Vladis and DJ Wugy. Cigo left the group to join the Petržalka group H16 and DJ Wugy to the group Rendeska.SK.

== Discography ==
=== Studio albums ===
- 2005: Taktomalobyťataktobude
- 2007: Premium

=== EP's ===
- 2006: Bar Element

=== Singles ===
- 2010: Vladis - Evolúcia (mixtape)
- 2010: Vladis - Generácia (2CD) (album)
- 2010: Suvereno - Král vs Joker (album)
- 2011: Vladis - Fénix (mixtape)
- 2011: Pery, Bonano, Vladis - Pery Bonano Vladis (mixtape)
- 2011: Suvereno - Zlatá stredná cesta (mixtape)
- 2012: Suvereno - Alchymista (album)
- 2012: Vladis - Svet nie je pre chudobných (album)
