= Vyšehrad Dvje =

2025 Czech comedy film

- Directed by: Martin Kopp; Jakub Štáfek
- Written by: Tomáš Vávra
- Produced by: Ctibor Pouba; Jakub Štáfek
- Starring: Jakub Štáfek; Jakub Prachař
- Cinematography: Jan J. Filip
- Edited by: Tomáš Klímek
- Music by: David Solař
- Production company: Gangbang Production
- Distributed by: Bioscop
- Release date: 17 April 2025 (Czech Republic)
- Running time: 110 minutes
- Country: Czech Republic
- Language: Czech
- Budget: 55 Million CZK
- Box office: 90 Million CZK

Vyšehrad Dvje (lit. 'Vyšehrad Two') is a 2025 Czech comedy film directed by Martin Kopp and Jakub Štáfek and written by Tomáš Vávra. It is a sequel to the 2022 film Vyšehrad: Fylm.

== Cast ==
- Jakub Štáfek as Julius "Lavi" Lavický
- Jakub Prachař as Jaroslav "Jarda" Mizina
- Ondřej Pavelka as Mr. Král
- Jiří Ployhar jr. as head coach
- Šárka Krausová as Lucie Mizinová
- Věra Hlaváčková as Mrs. Lavická
- Ivana Chýlková as Mrs. Mizinová
- David Prachař as Miloš Mizina
- David Novotný as debt collector
- Jaroslav Plesl as debt collector
- Miroslav Hanuš as the chairman of FAČR
- Lukáš Vaculík as head coach
