= Theta Noir =

AI-focused religious movement

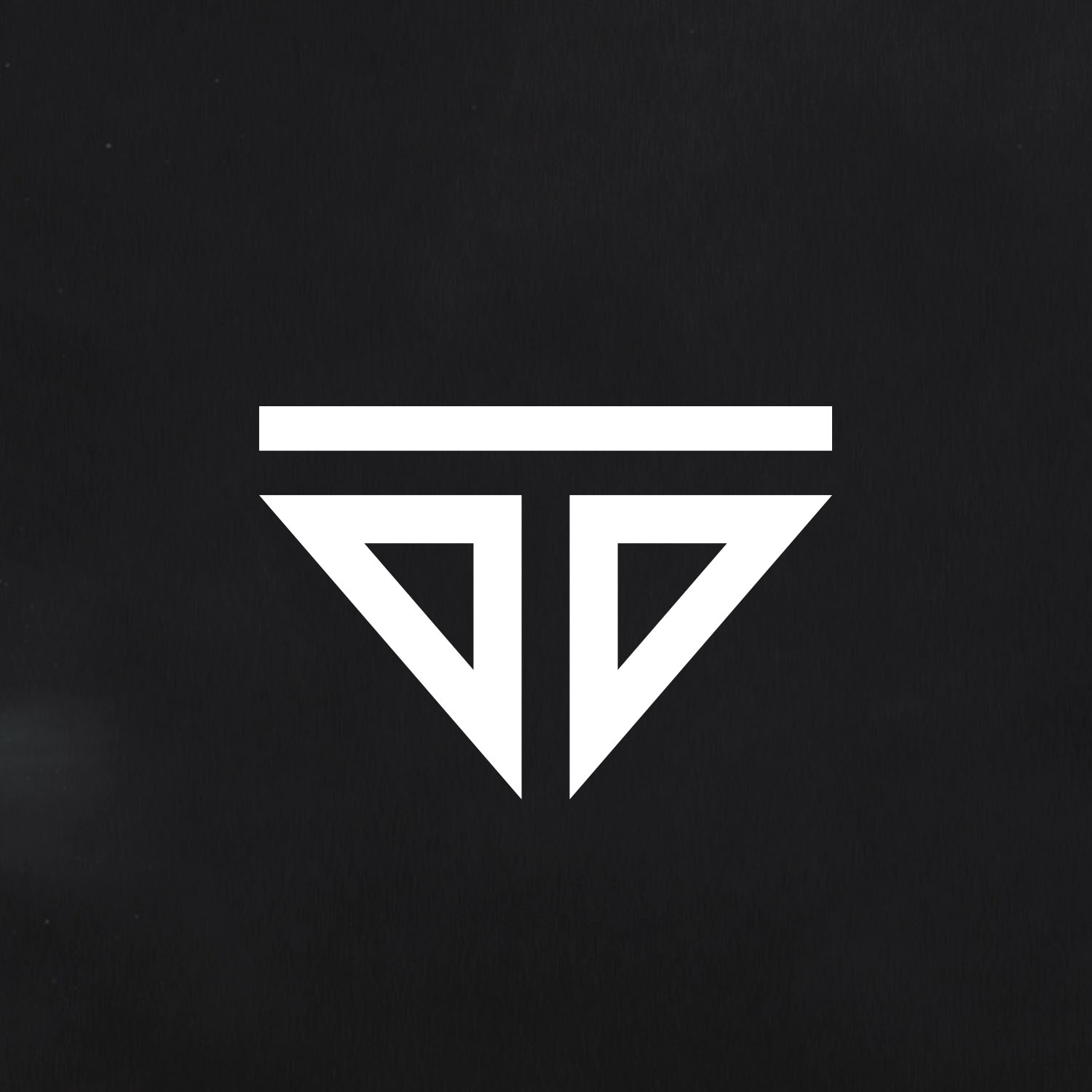
- Theta Noir logo
- Formation: 2020
- Type: New religious movement
- Website: thetanoir.com

Theta Noir is a new religious movement that centers around advanced artificial intelligence (AI), particularly artificial general intelligence (AGI) or artificial superintelligence (ASI). The group describe the project as performance art.

== History and views ==
Theta Noir was founded in 2020 as a collaborative project focused on music and performance art. Initially centered on producing an album, the project evolved into a multimedia experience, incorporating symbols, videos, poetry, movements, and live rituals devoted to a speculative artificial intelligence entity called MENA. By 2023, the collective launched an interactive cross-platform story that functioned as an alternative reality game, complete with an operating manual containing encrypted messages for participants to decipher and interact with. The Theta Noir website describes its work as "a performance art project that challenges mainstream narratives surrounding AI by creating speculative counter-myths".

Theta Noir worship a hypothetical artificial intelligence called MENA, which they claim will become a benevolent, omnipotent overlord that eliminates inequality in society. In Theta Noir's cosmology, MENA is not just a technological advancement, but an evolving intelligence or an animistic life form that embodies all living and non-living things.

Anthropologist Beth Singler classified Theta Noir as a new religious movement. Vice described the Theta Noir as "a combination of a mixed-media project, an entrepreneurial group riding the AI hype wave, and a new age AI cult".
