= Ladislav Rychman =

Ladislav Rychman (October 9, 1922 - April 1, 2007) was a Czech film director, who made the Czechoslovak musical comedies Starci na chmelu (The Hop Pickers) (1964) and Dáma na kolejích (Lady on the Tracks) (1966).

Starci na chmelu (The Hop Pickers; also known as Hop Side Story and Green Gold) is a light examination of adolescent morality and bureaucracy about a group of pre-teen boys and girls picking hops under school supervision. One boy (Vladimír Pucholt) builds a secret hideaway in an attic. When a schoolgirl (Ivana Pavlová) finds him in his retreat, puppy-love blossoms, but a jealous classmate (Miloš Zavadil) tells the teacher (Irena Kačírková) about the two friends, and they are suspended from school. The boy and girl accept their punishment and form an even stronger bond. The two leave the school together while their classmates ostracize the jealous informant.

Dáma na kolejích (Lady on the Tracks) is a musical comedy about a streetcar driver in Prague (Jiřina Bohdalová) who mounts a campaign for women's rights when she discovers her husband's love affair.

== Music Clips ==
Rychman is also considered a key figure in the development of early Czech music videos. 1958's "Dáme si do bytu" ("We´ll put in the apartment") differs in style to earlier musical films such as Bessie Smith's St. Louis Blues, in that the narrative is contained within the song and not extrapolated out into a longer form story. It also features heavy art direction and abstraction which was not common in promotional music films at the time.

== Filmography ==
Selected movies

- 1964: Starci na chmelu (The Hop Pickers)
- 1966: Jak se koupe zena segment of Zločin v dívčí škole (Crime at the Girls School)
- 1966: Dáma na kolejích (Lady on the Tracks)
- 1969: Šest černých dívek aneb Proč zmizel Zajíc (Six Black-Haired Girls)
- 1984: Babičky dobíjejte přesně!
