= The Death of Black King =

- Release date: 1971
- Country: Czechoslovakia

The Death of Black King (Czech: Smrt černého krále) is a 1971 Czechoslovak film. The film starred Vlastimil Brodský, Jaroslav Marvan, Josef Vinklář, Josef Kemr, Stanislav Fišer, etc.
