= Starci na chmelu =

Starci na chmelu ("The Hop Pickers") is a 1964 Czechoslovak film directed by Ladislav Rychman. The film starred Josef Kemr, Milos Zavadil and Ivana Pavlová.
