= Jana Dítětová =

Czechoslovak actress

- Born: 7 October 1926; Plzeň, Czechoslovakia
- Died: 9 November 1991 (aged 65); Prague, Czechoslovakia
- Occupation: Actress
- Years active: 1942–1988

Jana Dítětová, née Kalabzová (7 October 1926 – 9 November 1991) was a Czech film actress. She appeared in 40 films between 1942 and 1988. She was married to Czech actor Josef Vinklář.

== Selected filmography ==
- Happy Journey (1943)
- Spring Song (1944)
- The Wedding Ring (1944)
- Nobody Knows Anything (1947)
- A Kiss from the Stadium (1948)
- Steel Town (1950)
- Divá Bára (1949)
- Anna Proletářka (1950)
- May Events (1951)
- Dog's Heads (1955)
- The Joke (1969)
- Jak dostat tatínka do polepšovny (1978)
- Babičky dobíjejte přesně! (1984)
