= Josef Hlinomaz =

Czech actor (1914–1978)

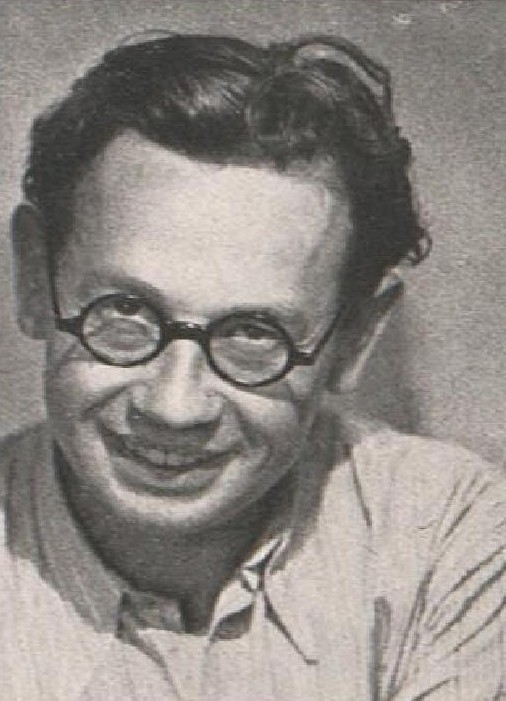
- Born: 9 October 1914; Prague, Bohemia, Austria-Hungary
- Died: 8 August 1978 (aged 63); Split, Yugoslavia
- Occupation: Actor
- Years active: 1948-1978

Josef Hlinomaz (9 October 1914 – 8 August 1978) was a Czech film actor, journalist and painter. He appeared in more than 150 films and television shows between 1948 and 1978.

== Selected filmography ==
- Old Ironside (1948)
- Komedianti (1954)
- The Strakonice Bagpiper (1955)
- The Good Soldier Schweik (1956)
- Hvězda jede na jih (1958)
- Dařbuján a Pandrhola (1960)
- Man in Outer Space (1961)
- The Fabulous Baron Munchausen (1961)
- Lemonade Joe (1964)
- The Pipes (1966)
- Happy End (1966)
- Lidé z maringotek (1966)
- The End of Agent W4C (1967)
- All My Compatriots (1968)
- Dream City (1973)
- Jáchyme, hoď ho do stroje! (1974)
- Za volantem nepřítel (1974)
- Rosy Dreams (1977)
