= I Dutifully Report =

1958 Czechoslovak comedy film

- Directed by: Karel Steklý
- Written by: Jaroslav Hašek; Karel Steklý
- Starring: Rudolf Hrušínský
- Cinematography: Jan Roth
- Edited by: Miroslav Hájek
- Music by: Jan Seidel
- Distributed by: Národní filmový archiv
- Release date: 1958
- Running time: 91 minutes
- Country: Czechoslovakia
- Language: Czech

I Dutifully Report (Czech: Poslušně hlásím) is a 1958 Czechoslovak comedy film directed by Karel Steklý. It is the sequel to The Good Soldier Schweik.

== Cast ==
- Rudolf Hrušínský as Josef Švejk
- Svatopluk Beneš as first lieutenant Lukáš
- Jaroslav Marvan as constable Flanderka
- Miloš Nedbal as general major Von Schwarzburg
- Fanda Mrázek as sergeant
- Jaroslav Vojta as shepherd
- Alois Dvorský as wanderer
- Jana Kovaříková as Pejzlerka
- František Černý as innkeeper
- František Šlégr as Schröder
- Otto Hradecký as Ságner
