= Dařbuján a Pandrhola =

1960 film

- Directed by: Martin Frič
- Written by: Jan Drda; Martin Frič
- Starring: Jiří Sovák
- Cinematography: Jan Novák
- Edited by: Jan Kohout
- Music by: Jiří Srnka
- Release date: 10 June 1960
- Running time: 80 minutes
- Country: Czechoslovakia
- Language: Czech

Dařbuján a Pandrhola is a 1960 Czech fairy tale comedy film directed by Martin Frič. The film is based on a fairy tale by Jan Drda based on motifs from Czech folklore.

== Plot ==
Dařbuján looks for a godfather for his newborn. He wants the godfather to be equally fair to all people, and eventually picks Smrťák (Grim Reaper), because death indeed treats all people equally. Smrťák gives Dařbuján godfather's gift: the ability to see whether a diseased person will die (Smrťák, visible only to Dařbuján, will stand by the bedridden sick person's head) or heal (Smrťák will stand by the person's feet). Dařbuján becomes famous as a healer. In the end Dařbuján cheats Smrťák and saves Pandrhola by turning his bed around. Dařbuján and Pandrhola entrap Smrťák in a beer barrel, but eventually have to release him, because without death a great upheaval arises; in particular, Pandrhola no longer can have meat, which he likes very much. Smrťák kills Pandrhola and takes away his gift from Dařbuján.

== Cast ==
- Jiří Sovák as Kuba Dařbuján
- Rudolf Hrušínský as Pandrhola
- Václav Lohniský as Smrťák
- Josef Hlinomaz as Bašta
