= Vyšehrad: Fylm =

2022 Czech comedy film

- Directed by: Martin Kopp; Jakub Štáfek
- Written by: Tomáš Vávra
- Based on: Vyšehrad by Tomáš Vávra
- Produced by: Ctibor Pouba; Jakub Štáfek; Jan Kallista
- Starring: Jakub Štáfek; Jakub Prachař
- Cinematography: Jan J. Filip
- Edited by: Tomáš Klímek
- Music by: Vojtěch Záveský; DJ Wich
- Production company: Gangbang Production
- Distributed by: Bioscop
- Release date: 14 April 2022 (Czech Republic)
- Running time: 105 minutes
- Country: Czech Republic
- Language: Czech
- Budget: 30 Million CZK
- Box office: 104,278,232 CZK

Vyšehrad: Fylm (lit. 'Visegrad: Film') is a 2022 Czech comedy film. It is a film adaptation to the 2016 television series Vyšehrad.

== Cast ==
- Jakub Štáfek as Julius "Lavi" Lavický
- Jakub Prachař as Jaroslav "Jarda" Mizina
- Ondřej Pavelka as Mr. Král
- Jiří Ployhar jr. as head coach
- Šárka Vaculíková as Lucie Mizinová
- Věra Hlaváčková as Mrs. Lavická
- Veronika Khek Kubařová as Mother of Lavi's son
- Ivana Chýlková as Mrs. Mizinová
- David Prachař as Miloš Mizina
- David Novotný as debt collector
- Jaroslav Plesl as debt collector
- Miroslav Hanuš as the chairman of FAČR
