= Women on the Run (film) =

2019 Czech comedy film by Martin Horský

- Directed by: Martin Horský
- Screenplay by: Martin Horský
- Produced by: Tomas Hoffman
- Starring: Zlata Adamovská, Tereza Kostková, Veronika Khek Kubařová, Jenovéfa Boková
- Cinematography: Jan Drnek
- Edited by: Ondrej Hokr
- Production company: Infinity Prague
- Distributed by: CinemArt
- Release date: 31 January 2019
- Running time: 93 minutes
- Country: Czech Republic
- Language: Czech
- Box office: CZK 211,925,133

Women on the Run (Czech title Ženy v běhu) is a 2019 Czech comedy film directed by Martin Horský. The film became the most successful Czech directorial debut when it was viewed by more than 1 million people after 42 days. The film eventually grossed 200 million CZK becoming the highest-grossing Czech film.

The 2025 Dutch film Dochters directed by Johan Nijenhuis is a remake of the film.

== Plot summary ==
To fulfill her partner's last wish, a mother and her three daughters decide to split a marathon into four parts to complete the 42 kilometer race as a family relay team.

== Cast ==
- Zlata Adamovská as Věra
- Tereza Kostková as Marcela
- Veronika Khek Kubařová as Bára
- Jenovéfa Boková as Kačka
- Ondřej Vetchý as Karel
- Vladimír Polívka as Vojta
- Martin Hofmann as Josef
- Samuel Gyertyák as
- Michaela Sodomková as
- David Kraus as Jirka
- Bolek Polívka as Jindřich
