= Unterwegs nach Atlantis =

- Directed by: Thomas Fantl
- Country of origin: Austria; West Germany; Switzerland; Czechoslovakia

Original release
- Release: 1981

Unterwegs nach Atlantis (translation: On the Way to Atlantis) is an Austrian-West German-Swiss-Czechoslovak science fiction television series from 1981.

== See also ==
- List of German television series
