= Josef Vinklář =

Czech actor (1930–2007)

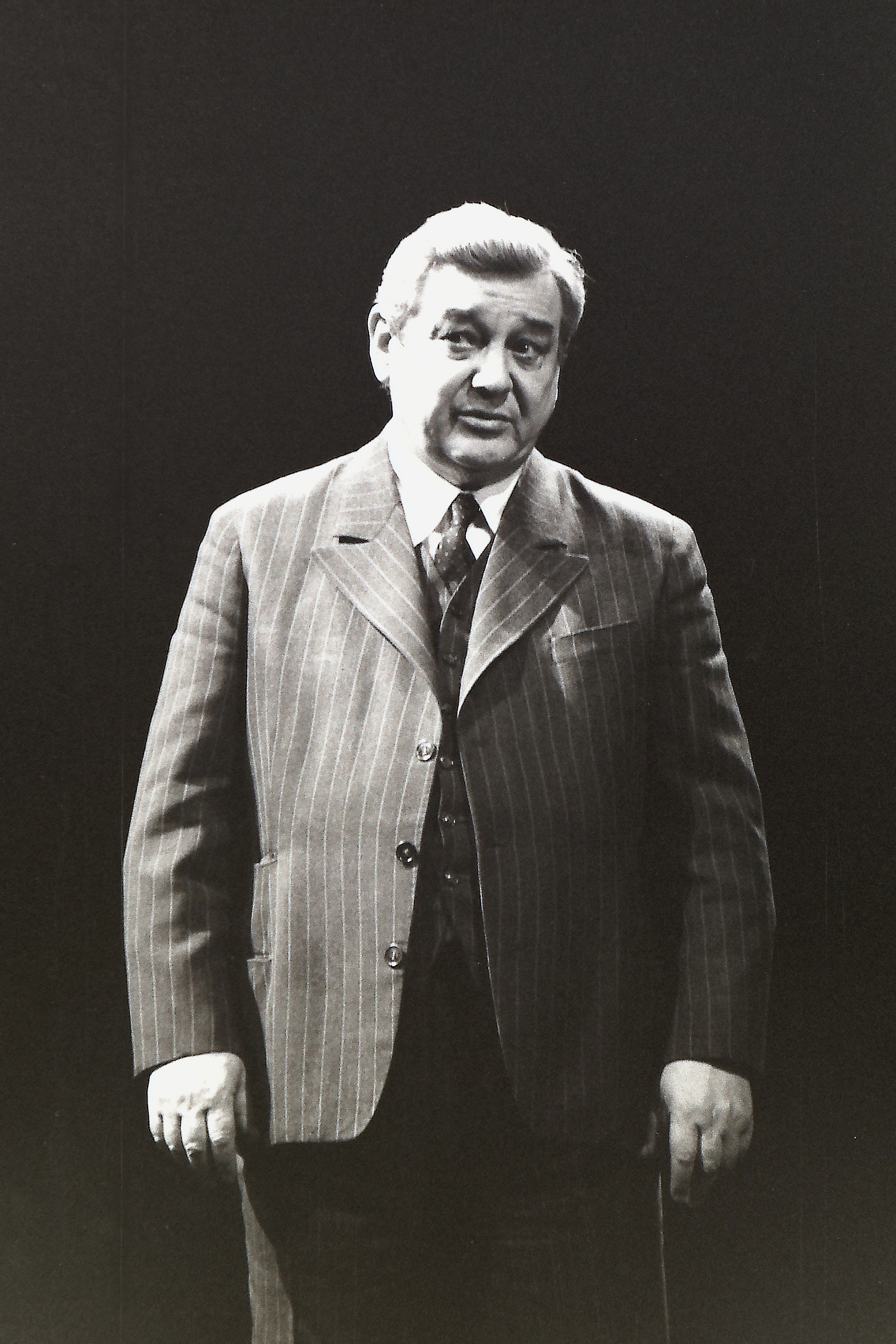
- Josef Vinklář (1986)
- Born: 10 November 1930; Podůlší, Czechoslovakia
- Died: 18 September 2007 (aged 76); Prague, Czech Republic
- Occupation: Actor
- Years active: 1946–2003

Josef Vinklář (10 November 1930, in Podůlší – 18 September 2007, in Prague) was a Czech actor, a member of the National Theatre. He was married to Czech actress Jana Dítětová.

== Biography ==
Born 10 November 1939, but when in 1946 the pastor exhibited a duplicate birth certificate and wrong date of birth of his and his brother and an incorrect date of birth of 14 November.

After graduating from junior secondary school, he joined a one-year learning course (1945) and simultaneously began acting in children's radio Dismanova file. Already in 1945, was a guest speaker at the Theatre of Satire and played there in the season 1945/1946. In the years 1946–1948 he was engaged in theatres Jan Werich Voskovec and Werich, then worked in Pardubice East Bohemia Theatre (1948–1950).

From August 1950 until July 1983 he has created a number of dramatic roles in Prague Realistic Theatre of Zdeněk Nejedlý (with the exception of the years 1951 to 1953, when he graduated from basic military service). Between 1981 and 1983, he hosted at the National Theatre and 1 August 1983 he became a full member of the drama. Then, as a guest at various theaters, e.g. In the Theatre in 1996, in a game of Friedrich Dürrenmatt Visit of the Old Lady (Czech: Návštěva staré dámy).

== Selected filmography ==
- Nezbedný bakalár (1946) – Martínek
- Predtucha (1947) – Václav Jelínek
- Nikola Suhaj (1947) – Herdsman
- Az se vrátís (1948) – Boy on Motorcycle
- Vítezná kridla (1951) – Vláda
- Mladá láska (1954) – Jirka
- Dnes vecer vsechno skoncí (1955) – Milan Pazdera
- Větrná hora (1956) – Antonín Homolka
- The Unconquered (1956) – Pvt. Mirek
- Silvery Wind (1956) – Valenta
- Hrátky s certem (1957) – Lucius
- Roztrzka (1958) – A Man Dancing in the Bar
- Rocník 21 (1958) – Olin
- Cesta zpátky (1959) – Dan Cihák
- 105% alibi (1959) – Jirka Broz, Karluv kamarád
- The Princess with the Golden Star (1959) – Cookie Janek
- Smyk (1960) – Kubes
- Policejní hodina (1961) – Werner
- Pohled do ocí (1961) – Petr Valenta
- Zámek pro Barborku (1963) – Karel Poustka
- Transport from Paradise (1963) – Vágus
- The Fifth Horseman Is Fear (1965) – velitel civilní obrany Vlastimil Fanta
- Atentát (1965) – rotný Karel Vrbas
- Transit Carlsbad (1966) – Carter
- Královský omyl (1968) – Heidenreich
- Ďábelské líbánky (1970) – Police Officer
- Pěnička a Paraplíčko (1971) – inspektor Josef Bouse
- Partie krásného dragouna (1971) – inspektor Josef Bouse
- Vrazda v hotelu Excelsior (1971) – inspektor Josef Bouse
- The Death of Black King (1972) – inspektor Josef Bouse
- Oáza (1972) – Nowak
- Kronika zhavého léta (1973) – Filip Tymes
- Jakou barvu má láska (1974) – Mácha (voice)
- Tam, kde hnízdí čápi (1975) – Fabián
- Všichni proti všem (1977) – Dedara
- Hop – a je tu lidoop (1978) – Butcher Turecek
- Zrcadleni (1978) – Viktor
- Stopar (1978) – Jirí Dusek
- Pod Jezevčí skálou (1978) – lesní delník zvaný Hromotluk
- Pumpari od Zlaté podkovy (1979) – Vávra
- Skandál v Gri-Gri baru (1979) – séfredaktor Práva lidu Foltýn
- Tajemství Ocelového mesta (1979) – Profesor chemie Eric Janus
- Vrazedné pochybnosti (1979) – Capt. Kolousek
- Pan Vok odchází (1979) – Simon
- Concert at the End of Summer (1980) – Antonín Dvorák
- Pátek není svátek (1980) – Masér
- Kdo prichází pred pulnocí (1980) – recidivista Roman Kratochvíl
- Tajemství dáblovy kapsy (1980) – Stockinger
- Hra o královnu (1981) – Milota of Dedice
- Ta chvíle, ten okamžik (1981) – Novák
- V podstate jsme normální (1981) – masseur Zdenek Beznoska
- Kazdému jeho nebe (1981) – séf cinohry Národního divadla dr. Pilar
- Hadí jed (1981) – Jan Veselý
- Malý velký hokejista (1982) – Hájek
- Má láska s Jakubem (1982) – Tomsovský
- Sileny kankan (1983) – halicský smelinár Milan Scholef
- Andel s dáblem v tele (1984) – poslanec Rudolf Nikodým
- Atomová katedrála (1985) – Chairman Milý
- Polocas stestí (1985) – Ondrej Bozdech
- Tisnove volani (1985) – porucík Josef Kabát
- Mravenci nesou smrt (1986) – podplukovnik VB Korán
- Velká filmová loupez (1986)
- Dva na koni, jeden na oslu (1987) – Mátoha
- Pesti ve tme (1987) – Krakowski
- Evropa tancila valcik (1989) – Franz Ferdinand d'Este
- Kanarska spojka (1993) – Aron
- Jak chutná smrt (1995) – Vlach
- Das Zauberbuch (1996) – King (voice)
- Pasáz (1997) – Krystof
- Polojasno (1999)
- Isabela, vévodkyne Bourbonská (1999) – Karel IV
- Cizinci v case (2000)
- Andělská tvář (2002) – Judge Pinaud
- Lesní chodci (2003) – Investigator
- The Red Baron (2008) – Paul von Hindenburg (final film role)
