= Rudolf Hrušínský =

Czech actor (1920–1994)

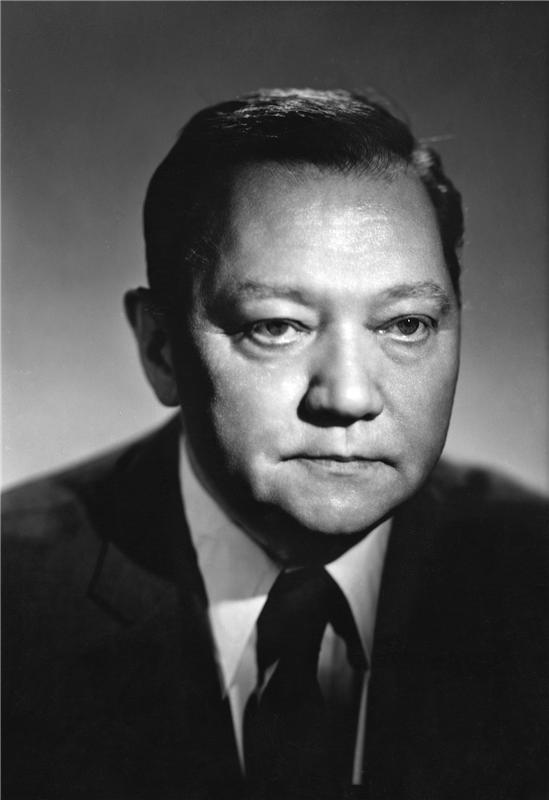
- National Theatre portrait of Hrušínský
- Born: 17 October 1920; Nová Včelnice, Czechoslovakia
- Died: 13 April 1994 (aged 73); Prague, Czech Republic
- Occupations: Actor, Politician

Signature
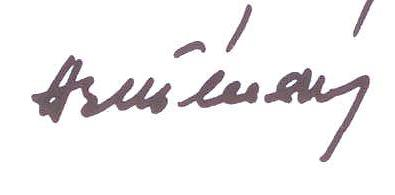

Rudolf Hrušínský (17 October 1920 – 13 April 1994) was a Czech actor. He was one of the most popular Czech actors. Many of his movies such as The Good Soldier Švejk, The Cremator, and Capricious Summer are considered classics of the Czech cinema. He was awarded the Legion of Honor by France and title National Artist in Czechoslovakia. Jiří Menzel once described him as "the Czech Jean Gabin."

== Biography ==
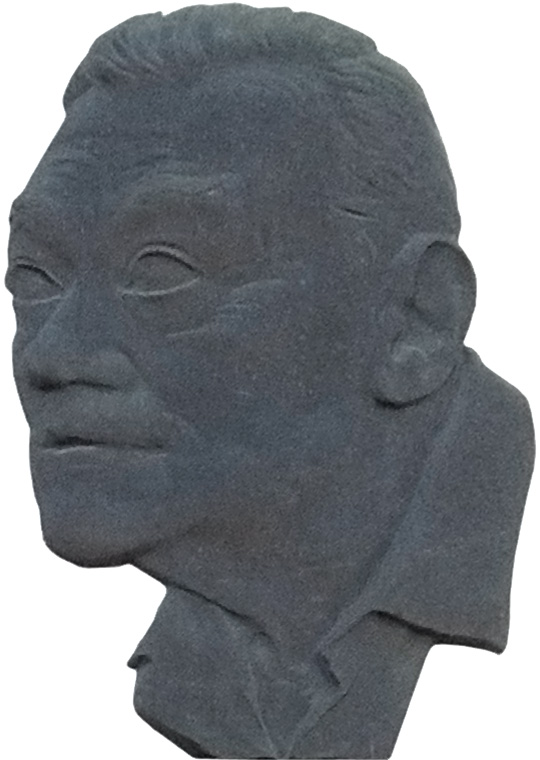
Memorial plaque in his native town

He was born back stage at the theatre in Nová Včelnice on 17 October 1920. His parents were Hermina Červičková and Rudolf Hrušínský (born Rudolf Böhm). His family moved from place to place, but eventually settled in Prague. He studied law school, but dropped out of to pursue acting. Initially he starred in minor plays, but managed to escalate to famous film roles, many of which won him fame abroad. He spent most of his theatrical career in Czech National Theatre. In 1968 he signed The Two Thousand Words manifesto. As a result he was not allowed to star in movies or in theatres until 1976.

Director Jiří Menzel planned to make a West German TV series adaptation of Good Soldier Švejk with Hrušínský in the titular role, however they did not get the permission from the Czechoslovak government.

After the Velvet Revolution he entered the Parliament as a member of Civic Forum. His sons Rudolf Hrušínský Jr. and Jan Hrušínský are both actors.

He died in 1994 and is buried in Olšany Cemetery, Prague.

== Selected filmography ==
- Cesta do hlubin študákovy duše (1939)
- Humoreska (1939)
- Turbina (1941)
- Nocturnal Butterfly (1941)
- The Hard Life of an Adventurer (1941)
- Barbora Hlavsová (1942)
- Spring Song (1944)
- Mist on the Moors (1944)
- Premonition (1947)
- The Last of the Mohicans (1947)
- The Secret of Blood (1953)
- The Strakonice Bagpiper (1955)
- The Good Soldier Švejk (1957)
- Hvězda jede na jih (1958)
- I Dutifully Report (1958)
- Dařbuján a Pandrhola (1960)
- The Night Guest (1961)
- Ninety Degrees in the Shade (1965)
- Capricious Summer (Rozmarné léto, 1967)
- The Cremator (Spalovač mrtvol, 1968)
- Larks on a String (Skřivánci na niti, 1969)
- Dinner for Adele (Adéla ještě nevečeřela, 1977)
- Swap (A kétfenekű dob, 1978)
- Ball Lightning (Kulový blesk, 1978)
- Those Wonderful Movie Cranks (1978)
- Lásky mezi kapkami deště (1979)
- Cutting It Short (Postřižiny, 1980)
- Pozor, vizita! (1981)
- The Mysterious Castle in the Carpathians (Tajemství hradu v Karpatech, 1981)
- Unterwegs nach Atlantis (1982, TV series)
- The Snowdrop Festival (Slavnosti sněženek, 1983)
- Three Veterans (Tři veteráni, 1983)
- Dissolved and Effused (Rozpuštěný a vypuštěný, 1984)
- My Sweet Little Village (Vesničko má středisková, 1985)
- Forbidden Dreams (Smrt krásných srnců, 1986)
- Dobří holubi se vracejí (1988)
- How Poets Are Enjoying Their Lives (1988)
- The End of Old Times (1989)
- The Elementary School (Obecná škola, 1991)
- La piovra, season 6 (1992, TV series)
- The Valley of Stone (1992)
