= Oldřich Velen =

Czech actor

- Born: Oldřich Volek; 15 September 1921; Brno-Tuřany, Czechoslovakia
- Died: 4 May 2013 (aged 91); Prague, Czech Republic
- Occupation: Actor
- Years active: 1950–2012

Oldřich Velen, birth name Oldřich Volek (15 September 1921 in Brno-Tuřany – 4 May 2013) was a Czech actor. He is known from the successful television series Slovácko sa nesúdí, after the books by Zdeněk Galuška where he played a major role (figure Jura Klásek) together with the popular actor Slovak Jozef Kroner. He also appeared in 5 episodes of Křeček v noční košili and 5 episodes of Arabela se vrací.

Velen played nearly 300 different film roles. After graduating high school in Brno Conservatory and began playing in theater in České Budějovice, this theater was later by the Nazis forcibly relocated to Tábor. During the Nazi occupation he was also imprisoned in Brno Kounic college, which during World War II served as the main Moravian Brno Gestapo prison. For sixteen years he worked in the theater in Olomouc; he was also a member of the Barrandov Studios acting group, and played at the legendary Theatre on the Balustrade in Prague.

He appeared in movies like The Mysterious Castle in the Carpathians, but most of his movie roles were very minor.
