= Iva Janžurová =

Czech actress (born 1941)

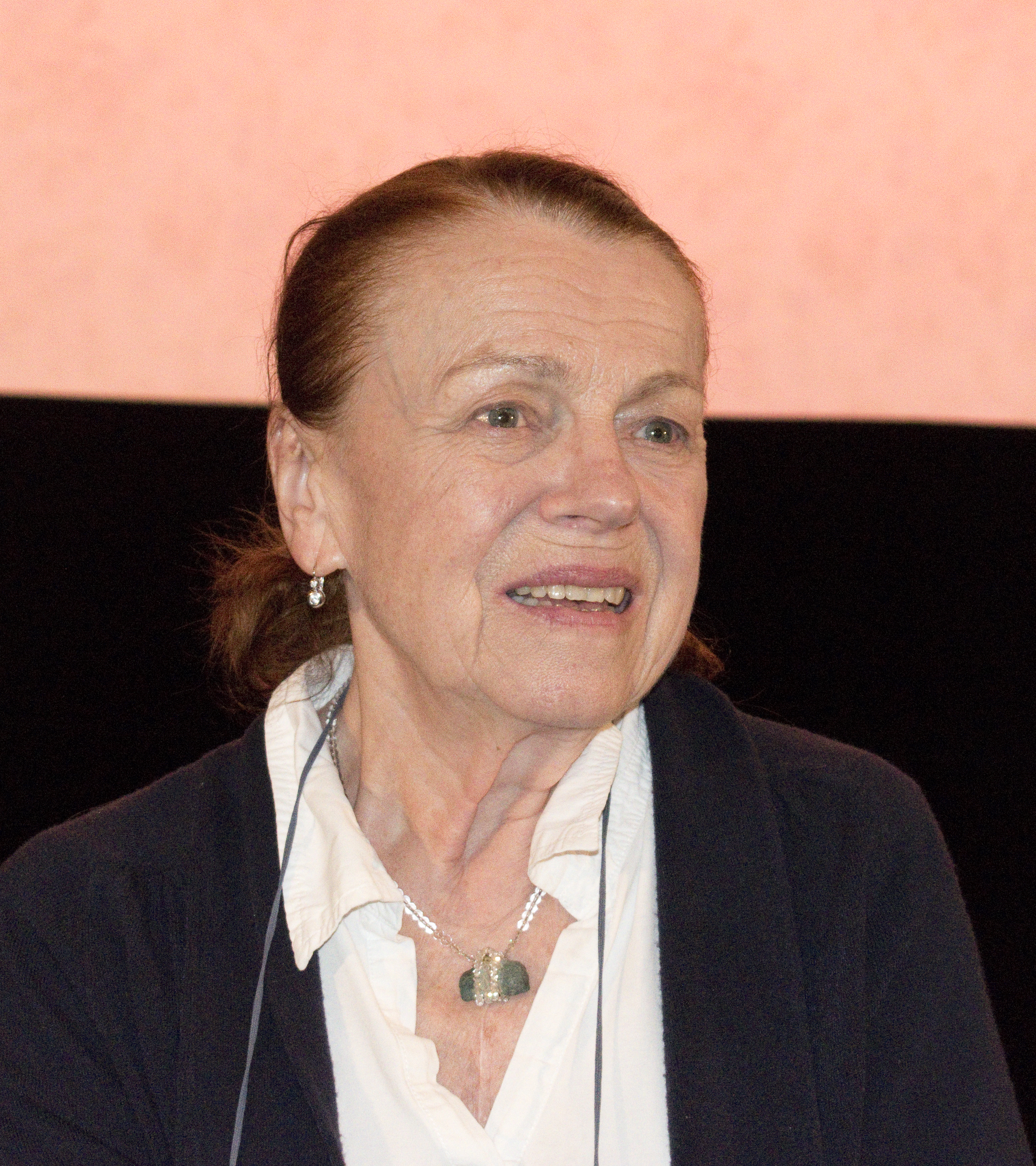
- Janžurová in 2019
- Born: 19 May 1941 (age 85); Žirovnice, Protectorate of Bohemia and Moravia
- Education: Academy of Performing Arts in Prague
- Occupation: Actress
- Years active: 1961–present
- Spouse: Jan Eisner (divorced)
- Partner: Stanislav Remunda
- Children: 2
- Awards: Czech Lion; Alfréd Radok; Thalia; Crystal Globe; Medal of Merit

Signature
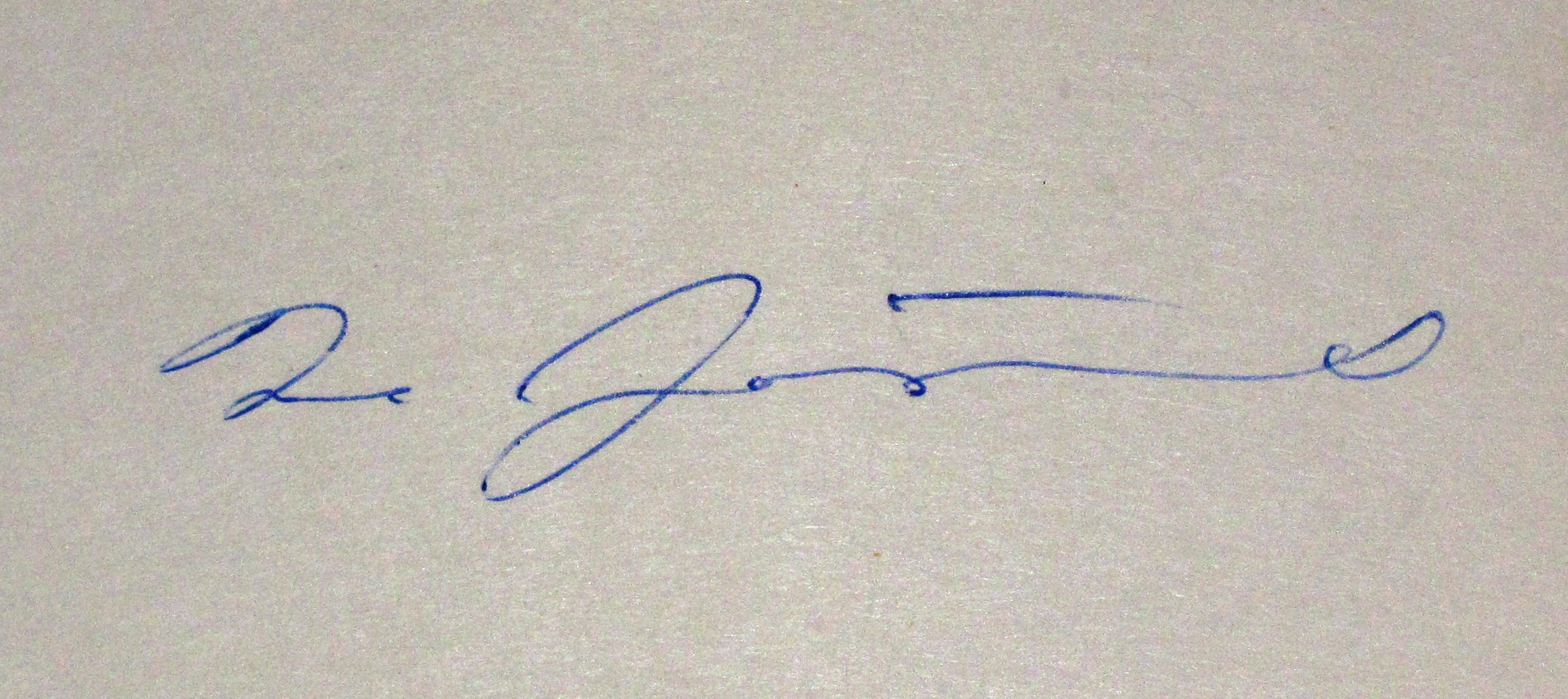

Iva Janžurová (born 19 May 1941) is a Czech actress. She attended school in České Budějovice and in 1963, she graduated from the Faculty of Theatre at the Academy of Performing Arts in Prague. In 1964, she became the main member of Vinohrady Theatre and since 1988 has been a member of the National Theatre in Prague. She has appeared in many films, such as Což takhle dát si špenát, Marecek, Pass Me the Pen!, and the television series Hospital at the End of the City. In 1998 and 2002, she was awarded the Czech Lion for Best Actress.

== Biography ==
Janžurová was born into a family of teachers. In 1959, she graduated from the pedagogical gymnasium in České Budějovice, but her interest in theatre led her to study acting afterward. Between 1959 and 1963, she studied under Vlasta Fabianová at DAMU in Prague. After graduating, she performed at the F. X. Šaldy Theatre in Liberec (1963–1964) and later found work at Vinohrady Theatre (1964–1987). She subsequently transferred to the National Theatre in 1988. Since 2012, she has been a guest at the Kalich Theatre.

Janžurová first appeared in film in the 1960s. After several episodic roles, director Karel Kachyňa cast her in his 1966 film, Coach to Vienna. She has since had numerous roles in film, television, and theatre. She was nominated for Best Actor at the Cannes Film Festival for her starring roles in Oil Lamps and Morgiana.

In 1968, she was married to Czech Television cinematographer Jan Eisner for half a year. Since then, her partner has been actor and director Stanislav Remunda, with whom she has two daughters, Theodora and Sabina Remundová. Both girls have performed with Janžurová in a travelling family theatre since the 1990s.

In 2013, she co-authored her autobiography, Včera, dnes a zítra, with writer Petr Macek.

== Selected filmography ==
=== Film ===
List of film appearances, with year, title, and role shown
Year	Title	Role	Notes
1966	Coach to Vienna	Krista	
1967	Svatba jako řemen	Hanička	
1968	Pension pro svobodné pány	Anděla	
1968	Nejlepší ženská mého života	Blanka	
1969	Světáci	Zuzana	
1970	I Killed Einstein, Gentlemen	Betsy	
1971	Four Murders Are Enough, Darling	Kate	
1971	You Are a Widow, Sir	Evelyna Kelettiová	
1971	Oil Lamps	Štěpa Kiliánová	
1972	Morgiana	Klára / Viktoria	
1976	Circus in the Circus	Dr. Whistlerová	
1976	Marecek, Pass Me the Pen!	Eva Týfová	
1976	Zítra to roztočíme, drahoušku...!	Alena Bartácková	
1977	Což takhle dát si špenát	Libuše / Lišková / Marcelka (adult)	
1998	Co chytneš v žitě	Bride (in the segment "Cesta")	
2002	Výlet	Mother	
2016	Tiger Theory	Grandmother	
2019	Shotgun Justice	Marie	

=== Television ===
List of television appearances, with year, title, and role shown
Year	Title	Role	Notes
1966	Eliška a její rod	Monika	7 episodes
1967–2019	Píseň pro Rudolfa III.	Šárka Vandasová	9 episodes
1968	Sňatky z rozumu	Betuše	4 episodes
1970	Fantom operety	Waldemara Krapsatá	5 episodes
1975–80	Bakaláři	various roles	3 episodes
1978–81	Hospital at the End of the City	Hunková / Penkavová	20 episodes
1980–81	Arabela	Miss Müllerová	6 episodes
1982	Dynastie Nováků	Helena Soukupová	5 episodes
1982	Dobrá Voda	Hovorová	7 episodes
1983	Létající Čestmír	Blechová	6 episodes
1984	Bambinot	Phippsová	6 episodes
1984–89	Paragrafy na kolech	various roles	7 episodes
1986	Zlá krev	Betuše Váchová	6 episodes
1988	Cirkus Humberto	Kostecková	2 episodes
1993–94	Arabela se vrací	Blekotová	11 episodes
2003	Hospital at the End of the City, Twenty Years On	Marta Penkavová	10 episodes
2010–11	Cukrárna	Bláza	13 episodes
2014–16	Doktori z Pocátku	Ema Beranová	58 episodes
2017	Ohnivý kuře	Slávka Hrubesová	41 episodes

== Awards and recognition ==
- Czech Lion for Best Actress – Co chytneš v žitě (1998)
- Alfréd Radok Award for Achievement of the Year (1998)
- Thalia Award for Best Actress in a Play – Šťastné dny (1998)
- Czech Lion for Best Actress – Výlet (2002)
- Crystal Globe for Outstanding Artistic Contribution to Czech Cinematography (2015)
- Medal of Merit II Degree (2016)
- Thalia Award for Lifetime Achievement (2021)
- Order of the White Lion, III. class
