= Vlastimil Harapes =

Czech dancer, choreographer and actor (1946–2024)

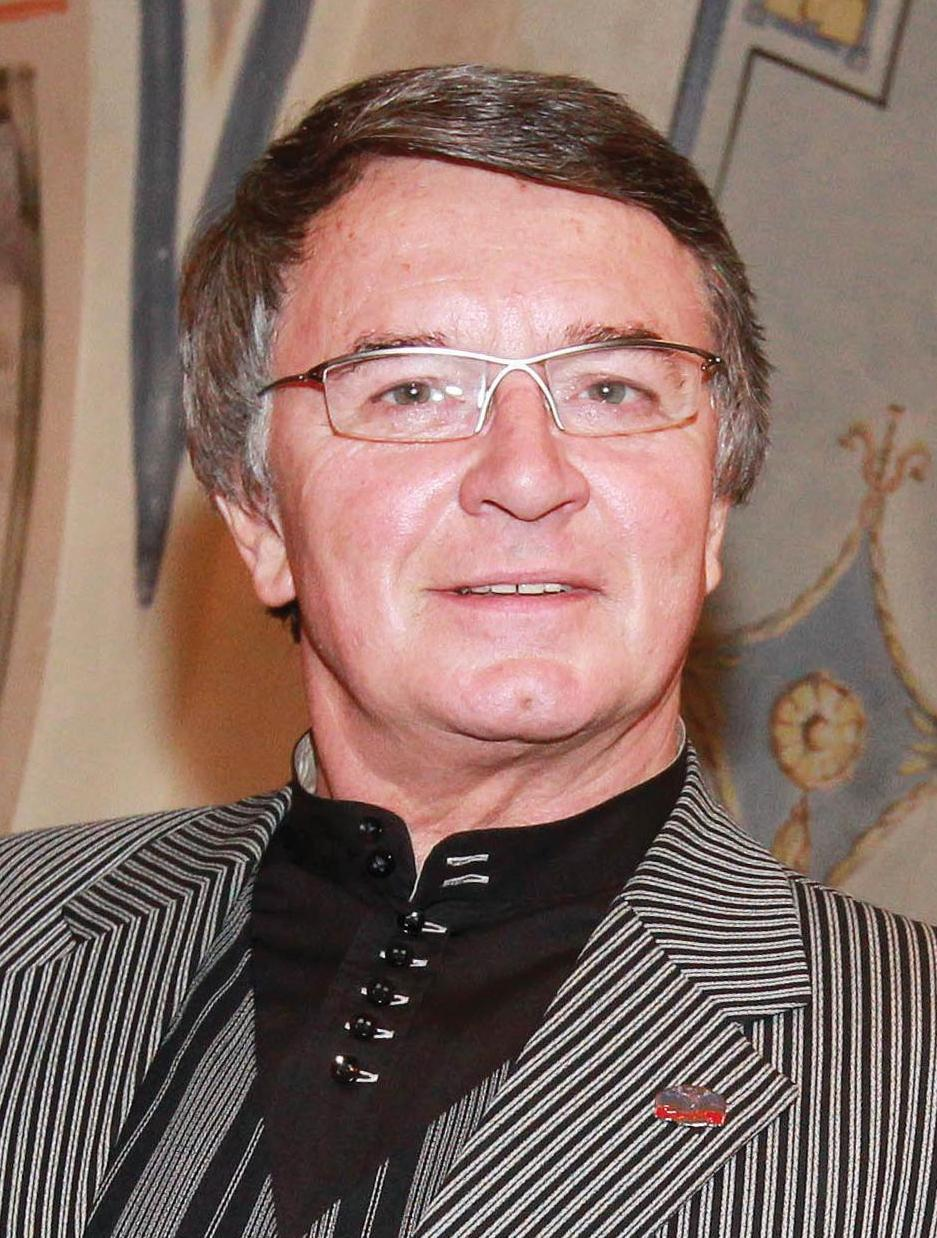
- Harapes in 2013
- Born: 24 July 1946; Chomutov, Czechoslovakia
- Died: 15 May 2024 (aged 77); Prague, Czech Republic
- Education: Prague Dance Conservatory
- Years active: 1964–2024
- Political party: Independent
- Other political affiliations: ANO 2011
- Spouse(s): Elena Strupková (divorced) Hana Zagorová (m. 1986; div. 1992)
- Partner: Josef Topol (1971–2015)

Vlastimil Harapes (24 July 1946 – 15 May 2024) was a Czech dancer, choreographer and actor. He served as the artistic director of the Prague Conservatory.

== Life and career ==
Harapes was born in a hospital in Chomutov on 24 July 1946, and but was native of Droužkovice, where he lived until the age of 14. His parents led an amateur theatre company, which allowed him to start acting at the age of five. After graduating from the Prague Dance Conservatory in 1965, he got a job at the National Theatre, where he was a soloist until his death. He also studied dance in Saint Petersburg, Russia.

His first wife was Elena Strupková. In 1986, he married singer Hana Zagorová in order to adopt a child, and the marriage lasted until 1992. However, Harapes lived with a male poet, Josef Topol, for over 44 years. Their relationship was kept a secret until it was revealed to the public in 2013.

Harapes acted in several films throughout his career, notably in Jak vytrhnout velrybě stoličku (directed by Marie Poledňákové) and Marketa Lazarová (directed by František Vláčil). However, most over his performances were overdubbed over by other actors. With his then wife Zagorová, he performed occasionally as a singer. In 2006, he was a judge in the first season of the show StarDance.

Harapes succumbed to lung cancer on 15 May 2024, at the age of 77.

In 2026, Harapes was buried in the Slavín tomb of the Vyšehrad Cemetery in Prague, which is intended for the most important personalities of Czech culture.

== Awards ==
- 1976: Merited Artist of Czechoslovakia
- 1980: Merited Artist of the National Theatre in Prague
- 1989: People's Artist of Czechoslovakia
- 2011: Thalia Award for Lifetime Achievement in Ballet

== Selected filmography ==
- 1964: Starci na chmelu
- 1967: Marketa Lazarová... Kristián
- 1968: Královský omyl
- 1971: F. L. Věk
- 1976: Day for My Love (voice dubbing František Němec)
- 1977: Jak vytrhnout velrybě stoličku (voice dubbing Jiří Klem)
- 1978: Jak dostat tatínka do polepšovny (voice dubbing Jiří Klem)
- 1978: Beauty and the Beast... the Beast (voice dubbing Jiří Zahajský)
- 1986: Operace mé dcery
- 2004: Bolero
- 2004: Rodinná pouta
- 2006: Jak se krotí krokodýli
- 2008: Comeback... cameo appearance

== Political activism ==
In 1977, Harapes signed the Anticharter In the 2016 Czech Senate election, he ran as an Independent candidate, backed by the ANO 2011 Party, in District No. 25. He captured 13.30% of the vote, finishing fourth place and did not advance to the second round.
