= Morgiana =

Morgiana may refer to:

- Morgiana (character), a character from One Thousand and One Nights
- Morgiana (film), a 1972 Czechoslovak Gothic horror/drama film
