= Gabriela Vránová =

Czech actress and voice actress

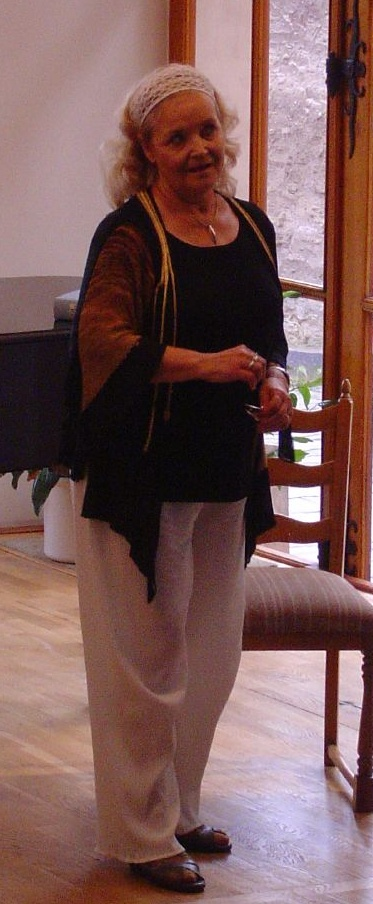
Gabriela Vránová

Gabriela Vránová (27 July 1939 – 16 June 2018) was a Czech actress and voice actress.

== Life and career ==
Vránová was born on 27 July 1939 in Nové Mesto nad Váhom. She was best known for her roles in the films The Treasure of a Byzantine Merchant (1966) and Monkey's Playtime (1978), and the television series Sňatky z rozumu (1968), Chalupáři (1974–75), Thirty Cases of Major Zeman, and F. L. Věk, among others. From 1959 till 2012, she appeared on numerous stage productions at the Vinohrady Theatre.

She was also known for voice acting. She regularly dubbed actresses such as Marilyn Monroe, Elizabeth Taylor, Catherine Deneuve and Jeanne Moreau.

Vránová died on 16 June 2018 in Prague.
