= Markéta Zinnerová =

Czech novelist and screenwriter

- Born: 21 June 1942 (age 84); Brno, Protectorate of Bohemia and Moravia
- Education: Film and TV School of the Academy of Performing Arts in Prague
- Occupations: Novelist, screenwriter

Markéta Zinnerová (married Markéta Jílková; born 21 June 1942) is a Czech novelist and screenwriter. She focuses on literature for children and youth. She is the author of several TV series for children and fairy tale films.

== Life ==
Markéta Zinnerová was born on 21 June 1942 in Brno, Protectorate of Bohemia and Moravia (now the Czech Republic). Her father worked in a managerial position in a textile factory and his mother was a factory worker. She graduated from a high school in Liberec in 1959 and then she attended an extension school in Prague (graduated in 1961). After studying in Prague, she worked in awareness-raising facilities in Liberec and Sokolov. From 1962 to 1964, she was employed as a train attendant in Liberec.

After her first maternity leave, in 1968, she began working as a magazine editor. She gradually worked for Mladý svět, Květy and Pionýr. From 1971 to 1976, she was a dramaturge of broadcasting for children and youth in the Czechoslovak Television. Since 1976, she has been a writer by profession, with breaks in 1981–1982, when she worked for the Czechoslovak Radio and in 1991–1992, when she worked as a methodologist at a children's home. From 1981 to 1985, she studied dramaturgy and screenwriting at Film and TV School of the Academy of Performing Arts in Prague (FAMU).

Since 2007, she has been living with her husband in Jindřichův Hradec.

=== Family ===
In the 1960s, Zinnerová married publicist Rudolf Zeman and they have two daughters and a son. Her second husband was the dramaturge Miloslav Vydra, and they had a son. Her third husband is the physician Milan Jílek. Although she took the surname Jílková, she did not stop publishing under her maiden name. Her daughter Petra Jelenová is an illustrator and has illustrated several of Zinnerová's books.

== Work ==
She published her first poem and short story at the age of twelve. Apart from one early novella (Zbytky mléčné dráhy), Zinnerová focuses exclusively on writing for children and youth. Many of her works have been published in both book and film form. Her work also includes fairy tales and radio plays. Her literary works include:

- Zbytky mléčné dráhy (1965)
- Drak Mrak (1972)
- Tajemství proutěného košíku (1978)
- Indiáni z Větrova (1983)
- Každý večer s kočkou Lindou (1992)
- Kde padají hvězdy (1997)
- Kočka Linda, poklad rodiny (2000)

Her screenwriting works include:

- Day for My Love (1976)
- Tajemství proutěného košíku (TV series; 1978)
- Indiáni z Větrova (1979)
- Za humny je drak (1982)
- My všichni školou povinní (TV series; 1984)
- Kde padají hvězdy (TV series; 1996)
