= Service Crew =

Service Crew could refer to:

- Leeds United Service Crew
- Person providing service
- Car attendant
