= Chalupáři =

Czechoslovak comedy television series

- Also known as: The Cottagers
- Created by: František Filip
- Starring: Jiří Sovák; Josef Kemr; Stella Zázvorková; Alena Vránová; Luba Skořepová; Hana Maciuchová; Jiřina Bohdalová; Josef Vinklář; Vladimír Menšík
- Country of origin: Czechoslovakia
- Original language: Czech
- No. of episodes: 11

Production
- Running time: 45 min

Original release
- Network: Czechoslovak Television
- Release: 1975

Chalupáři (The Cottagers) is a Czechoslovak comedy TV series filmed in 1974 and 1975 by František Filip.

== Plot ==
When former supervisor Evžen Huml, now on disability pension, returns from the spa to the small flat where he lives with the rest of his family in the small room behind the bathroom, he decides to move out of Prague to the peaceful countryside. He buys a cottage in the village of Třešňová, but there is one problem — there is still one former tenant in his dream cottage, Bohouš Císař, a pensioner too, who doesn't want to leave. Their adventures begin.

== Cast ==
- Jiří Sovák – Evžen Huml
- Josef Kemr – Bohouš Císař
- Jana Hlaváčová – Jarča Krbcová, Huml's daughter
- Josef Vinklář – Alois Krbec alias Siola, Huml son in law
- Jiří Schmitzer – Slávek Krbec, Huml's grandson
- Jiřina Bohdalová – Dáša Fuchsová
- Ilja Prachař – Antonín Balabán, Bohouš' friend, he later marries Dáša Fuchsová
- Josef Větrovec – Karel Mrázek
- Božena Böhmová – Mrázková
- Mahulena Bočanová – Miluška Mrázková
- František Filipovský – Lojza Klásek
- Josef Hlinomaz – Makovec
- Nina Popelíková – Makovcová
- Hana Maciuchová – Vlastička Makovcová
- Josef Beyvl – Brabec
- Stella Zázvorková – Brabcová
- Václav Sloup – Láďa Brabec
- Jaroslav Moučka – Karel Voborník
- Věra Tichánková – Marie Voborníková
- Vladimír Menšík – Tonda Čihák
- Gabriela Vránová – Anička Čiháková
- Otto Lackovič – Fero
- Luba Skořepová – Aranka
- Boleslav Skalski – Pišta
- Růžena Lysenková – Marie Bláhová
- Josef Čáp – Pepa Bláha
- Pavel Spálený – Standa
- Blanka Vikusová – Standa's wife
- Alena Vránová – Míla Jeřábková
- Jiří Adamíra – MUDr. Jiří Motl
