= F. L. Věk (TV series) =

Film directed by František Filip

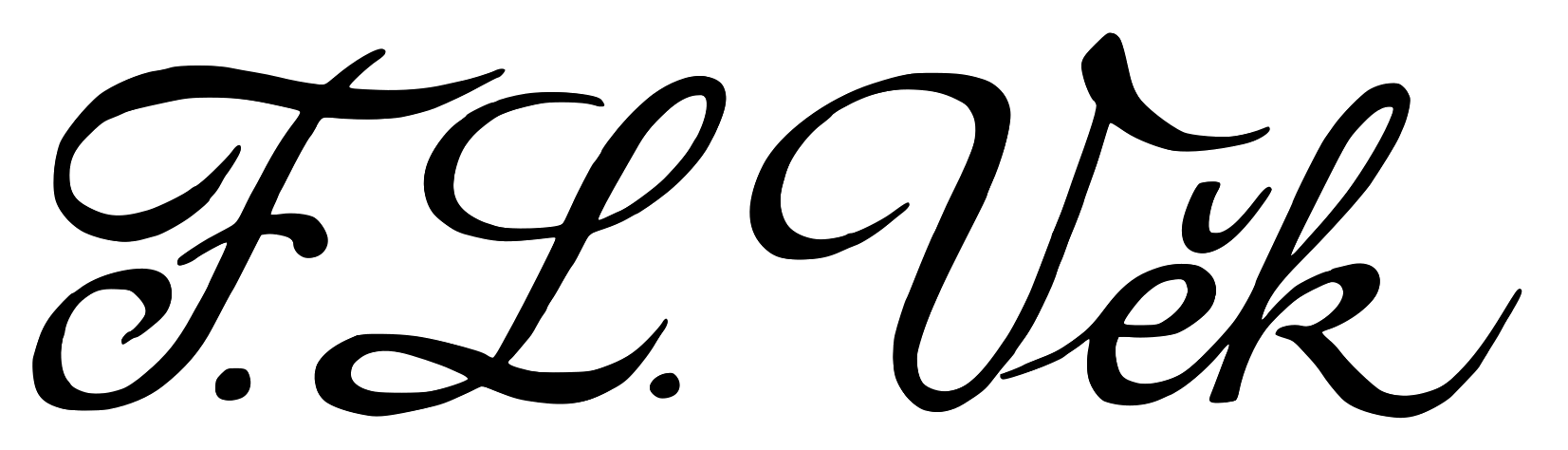
- Genre: Historical drama
- Written by: Otto Zelenka
- Directed by: František Filip
- Starring: Radoslav Brzobohatý
- Country of origin: Czechoslovakia
- No. of episodes: 13

Production
- Running time: 53 minutes

Original release
- Release: 1971 – 1972

F. L. Věk was a Czechoslovak television programme which was first broadcast in 1971, based on Alois Jirásek's book of the same name. The programme was directed by František Filip. The series is about life František Ladislav Věk, a Czech patriot and merchant from Dobruška. Story is set during the beginnings of Czech National Revival in the last third of 18th century, with a major focus on the period 1787–1791. Věk is based on František Vladislav Hek.

== Plot ==
In 1769, the longed-for son František was born into the family of Josef Věk, a merchant from Dobruška. At school, his godfather and local regenschori Havránek notices his singing talent, so he invites him to the church choir. When his cousin from Prague is looking for a good chorister, Havránek, with the consent of the Věks, recommends little František to him. In 1779, Young Věk leaves the small town in East Bohemia for Prague, where he is supposed to sing in a church choir. At the same time, he is provided with a scholarship for accommodation and food in the Benedictine monastery and studies at the grammar school. He graduates and plans to study philosophy in order to become a priest but he gradually gets to know the theater and other culture of the big city. He also meets many Czech patriots who strive to preserve and develop Czech culture and the Czech language in times when German language is predominant in the Czech capital.

== Cast ==
- Radoslav Brzobohatý as František Ladislav Věk, czech patriot
  - Antonín Sedlák as František Ladislav Věk (4 year old)
  - Jindřich Hrdý as František Ladislav Věk (10–12 year old)
  - Pavel Kolínský as František Ladislav Věk (15 year old)
- Jan Pivec as Josef Věk, František's father
- Antonie Hegerlíková as Anežka Věková, František's mother
- Dana Medřická as Butteauová
- Jana Brejchová as Paula Butteauová
- Jaroslav Marvan as František Havránek
- Radovan Lukavský as Václav Thám
- Gabriela Vránová as Betty Butteauová
- Václav Voska as Kramerius
- Bohuš Záhorský as Matouš Vrba
- Zdeněk Kryzánek as Žalman
- Vladimír Menšík as Pinkava
- Jan Tříska as Šebestián „Šebek“ Hněvkovský
- Martin Růžek as Vydra
- Eva Vosková as Marie „Márinka“ Snížková
