= Pavel Landovský =

Czech actor, playwright, and director (1936–2014)

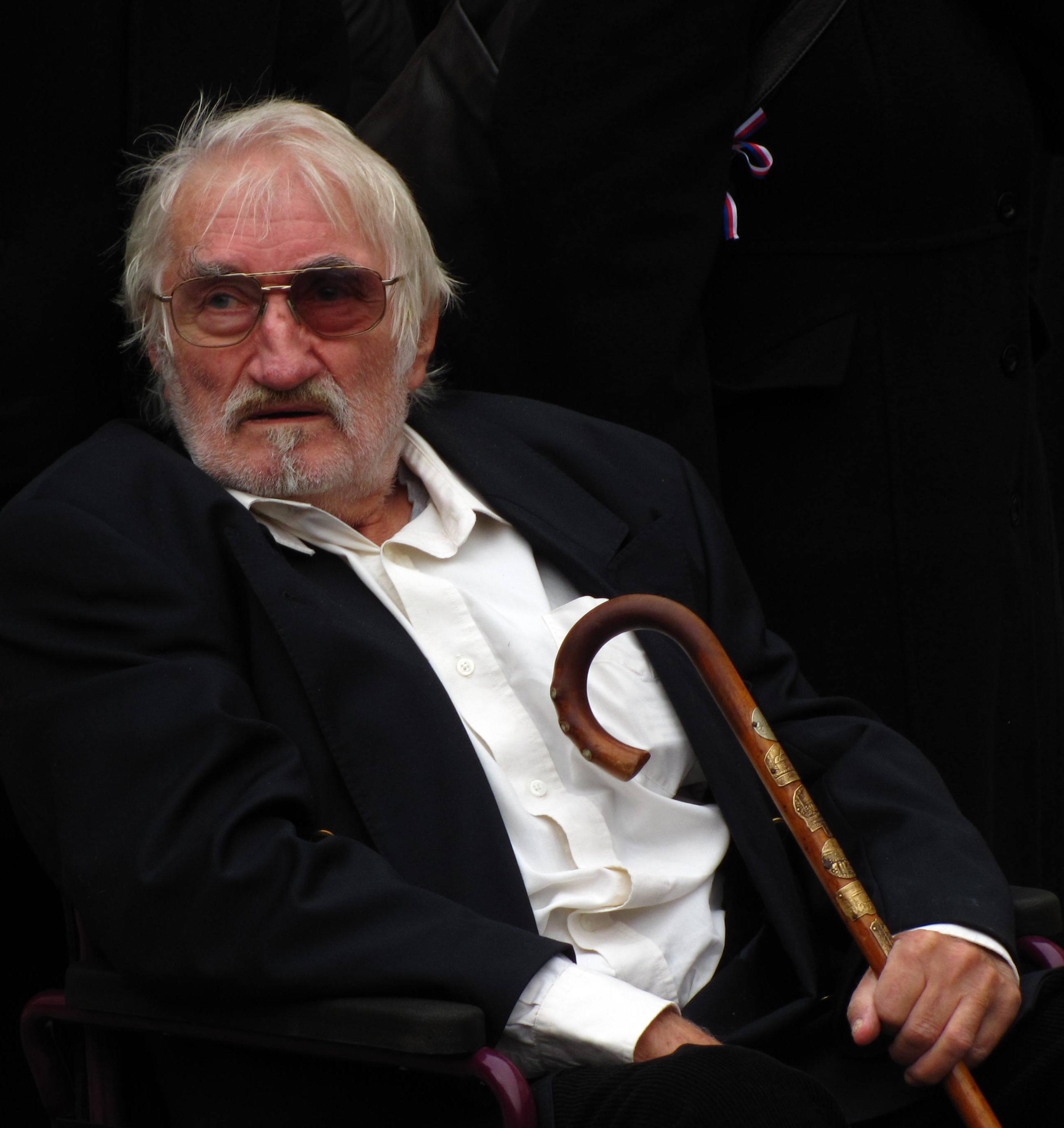
- Pavel Landovský, 2011
- Born: 11 September 1936; Havlíčkův Brod, Czechoslovakia
- Died: 10 October 2014 (aged 78); Kytín, Czech Republic
- Education: Academy of Performing Arts in Prague
- Occupations: Actor; playwright; director
- Spouse: Helena Albertová (1962–1973)
- Children: Jakub Landovský
- Awards: Medal of Merit

Pavel Landovský (11 September 1936 – 10 October 2014), nicknamed Lanďák, was a Czech actor, playwright, and director. He was a prominent dissident under the communist regime of former Czechoslovakia.

== Biography ==
Landovský was born in Havlíčkův Brod in 1936, and after finishing his studies at the secondary technical school of mechanical engineering, he tried four times to enter the Faculty of Theatre in Prague, without success. He started his acting career as a supernumerary actor in the regional theatre in Teplice and continued to perform in regional theatres in Šumperk, Klatovy, and Pardubice. The first play that he wrote, Hodinový hoteliér, premiered at the Činoherní klub theatre in Prague on 11 May 1969.

In 1971, the communist regime banned him from film and television. He continued acting at Činoherní klub and other theatres. Landovský was one of the initiators of the human rights petition Charter 77 and along with Václav Havel and Ludvík Vaculík, was one of the three official spokesmen for the resulting civil rights movement. He was subsequently banned from working at the theatre. Constantly harassed by the secret police (Státní bezpečnost), during the winter of 1978–79, Landovský was accosted at night by an agent, severely beaten, and had his leg broken. Feeling compelled to leave for his safety, when he was offered a position in the ensemble of the Burgtheater in Vienna, Austria, he accepted. While there, he participated in productions by Peter Zadek, among others.

After the Velvet Revolution, Landovský was able to return to Prague in January 1990. There he began to act again, performing regularly at the Theatre on the Balustrade, the National Theatre, Divadlo v Dlouhé, and Divadlo Hybernia between 1990 and 2008. He played one of the lead characters in Audience—written by his friend Václav Havel, who had recently been elected president of Czechoslovakia— at Činoherní klub. The play was directed by Jiří Menzel.

Landovský acted in a number of famous Czech films, including Closely Watched Trains, Marketa Lazarová, Adelheid, and Černí baroni.

Towards the end of his life, the actor suffered from diabetes and, after having had a stroke, used a wheelchair. He died at home in Kytín on 10 October 2014 from a heart attack, aged 78.

== Selected filmography ==
List of appearances, with year, title, and role shown
Year	Title	Role	Notes
1957	Dědeček automobil	Wedding guest with trumpet	
1969	Každý mladý muž	Lance corporal	
1969	Slečny přijdou později	Butler Pavka	
1969	Closely Watched Trains	Thief	Uncredited
1967	Znamení raka	Hyneček Hása	
1967	Svatba jako řemen	Driver	
1967	Marketa Lazarová	Smil	
1967	Soukromá vichřice	Standa Kocian	
1967	Zázračný hlavolam	Constable	
1967	Piknik	Burda	
1968	Klec pro dva	Youth	
1968	Pension pro svobodné pány	Nájemník	
1968	Muž, který stoupl v ceně	Tajný	
1968	Rakev ve snu viděti	Zdeněk Stýbr	
1969	End of a Priest	Watcher	
1969	Utrpení mladého Boháčka	Tonda Boháček	
1969	Flirt se slečnou Stříbrnou	Vašek	
1969	Já, truchlivý bůh	Apostol Certikidis	
1970	Adelheid	Guardsman Jindra	
1970	Case for a Rookie Hangman	Cop	
1971	Svatby pana Voka	Emperor Rudolph II	
1971	The Tricky Game of Love	Servant	(segment "Náusnice")
1971	Touha Sherlocka Holmese	Zabiják	
1972	Slaměný klobouk	Officer Emil	
1981	Ragtime	Solomon Peretz	
1981	Kopfstand	Stunk	
1981	Den Tüchtigen gehört die Welt	Jakob Králíček	
1983	Hunderennen	Ladislav Lapák	
1984	Lieber Vater	Concierge	
1985	The Cop and the Girl	Scrapyard guard	
1988	The Unbearable Lightness of Being	Pavel	
1989	Die goldenen Jungrau	Festival director	
1989	Follow Me	Professor Pavel Navrátil	
1991	V žáru královské lásky	Father	
1992	Černí baroni	Major Haluška	
1993	Válka barev	Airport administrator	
1994	Amerika	Robinson	
1995	Hazard	Demo	
1997	An Ambiguous Report About the End of the World	Reeve	
1997	Cesta pustým lesem	Kokesch	
1998	Stůj, nebo se netrefím!	Petřina	
2000	Andel Exit	Machata	
2001	Mach, Šebestová a kouzelné sluchátko	Mr. Prucha	
2001	Bez tváře	Bus driver	
2005	Kousek nebe	Starej	
2007	Empties	Řezáč	
2007	Chyťte doktora	Cyril Záruba	
2008	Shameless	Bedřich, Oskar's father	
2009	Stínu neutečeš	Granddad Rehor	
2011	Westernstory	Trubec	
2012	Bastardi 3	Grandfather	
2016	Smrtelné historky	Grandfather	(final film role)
