= Utrpení mladého Boháčka =

1969 Czechoslovak comedy film

- Directed by: František Filip
- Written by: Eduard Verner
- Screenplay by: Eduard Verner; František Filip
- Starring: Pavel Landovský; Stella Zázvorková; Regina Rázlová; Jorga Kotrbová; Jaroslav Satoranský
- Cinematography: Rudolf Stahl
- Edited by: Jan Kohout
- Music by: Jiří Bažant; Jiří Malásek
- Production company: Barrandov Studios
- Release date: 25 July 1969
- Running time: 90 minutes
- Country: Czechoslovakia
- Language: Czech

Utrpení mladého Boháčka is a Czech comedy film written by Eduard Verner and directed by František Filip. It was released in 1969.

== Plot ==
Thirty-year-old Tonda Boháček works as a tractor driver in Čečelice. He lives with his mother, who constantly urges him to find a girl, and one day even posts a classified ad on his behalf. From the responses he gets, Mrs. Boháček selects Jana, and pressures her son to go meet her in the neighbouring town of Úvaly. Tonda goes off, and on the way, he stops at a coffeehouse. In his reluctance to change his lifestyle and get married, he decides to write a letter, ostensibly from Jana herself, indicating she does not wish to see him a second time. Still at the coffeehouse, he meets a bunch of travellers, one of whom is Květa Lesecká. Tonda leaves the bar and heads off to meet Jana. The encounter is awkward and ends in mutual embarrassment, and Tonda returns home. On the way, he picks up a hitchhiker, who is none other than Květa Lesecká from the bar. Remembering that he had promised his mother to bring Jana home for supper, he invites Květa to join him instead. Tonda quickly falls for the young lady, whom he finds down-to-earth and easy to talk to, despite his natural timidness.

== Cast and characters ==
- Pavel Landovský as Tonda Boháček
- Stella Zázvorková as Mother
- Regina Rázlová as Květa Lesecká
- Jorga Kotrbová as Jana Pazderková
- Jaroslav Satoranský as Petr Stárek
