= Beauty and the Beast (1978 film) =

1978 Czechoslovak film

- Theatrical release poster
- Czech: Panna a netvor
- Directed by: Juraj Herz
- Written by: Pavla Marková
- Story by: František Hrubín; Ota Hofman
- Based on: La Belle et la Bête by Jeanne-Marie Leprince de Beaumont
- Starring: Zdena Studenková; Vlastimil Harapes
- Cinematography: Viktor Růžička
- Edited by: Jaromír Janáček
- Music by: Petr Hapka
- Production company: Barrandov Studios
- Distributed by: Ústřední půjčovna filmů
- Release date: March 2, 1979
- Running time: 91 minutes
- Country: Czechoslovakia
- Language: Czech

Beauty and the Beast (Czech: Panna a netvor; literally translates to The Virgin and the Monster) is a 1978 Czechoslovak Gothic horror film directed by Juraj Herz from the script by Pavla Marková. It is based on Jeanne-Marie Leprince de Beaumont's 1756 fairy tale Beauty and the Beast. It premiered on 2 March 1979.

For his direction, Herz received the Medalla Sitges en Oro de Ley at the Sitges Film Festival in 1979.

== Plot ==
A widowed merchant lives with his three daughters. As he prepares the wedding feast for his two older daughters in anticipation of their dowry, he plans to sell expensive goods he has travelling with him. The caravan carrying these goods cuts through some woods that are rumoured to be cursed, and while going through they are attacked by an unseen monster. The attack causes all the goods to be broken or sent falling into a river. This causes the father to have to sell most of the home's belongings to make up for the lost income.

While the father begins his journey to sell more of their belongings including a painting of his deceased wife, his two oldest are materialist and want gold or pearls while Julie (Zdena Studenková), the youngest asks he returns safely and a rose would be enough. He crosses an enchanted forest, arrives at a decrepit castle he believes is abandoned, finding free food and drink mysteriously laid out for him, and he falls asleep beside the fire. When he awakens, he discovers jewels and riches on a table and the painting gone, which he takes. Grateful for the unexpected generosity found at this mansion, he thanks the unknown host who had given him shelter.

The father picks a white rose in the mansion garden while leaving, where he meets a bloodthirsty being (Vlastimil Harapes), half-man, half-falcon, who sentences him to death for taking the rose. The father says he was getting it for his youngest daughter and begs for mercy. The beast says the only chance of survival would be for one of his daughters to sacrifice herself, who would have to agree to remain a prisoner of the Beast. The merchant refuses and agrees to die.

Julie is the only one of the three daughters who chooses to save her father's life. Julie travels to the castle on a horse sent by the Beast. Upon arriving, she drinks from a glass unknowingly laced with a sleeping potion. In her sleep, she dreams of a handsome man rescuing her and carrying her through the halls of a castle. Meanwhile, The Beast is haunted by his violent thoughts of killing Julie, but his growing love for Julie prevents him from harming her and instead hunts a young deer to stop his craving for blood.

Although Julie is forbidden from seeing the Beast, she gradually falls in love through their nightly conversations. Over time, Julie grows tired of the castle and longs for her sisters and father. The Beast grants her wish by showing her family through a magic door in the castle walls. One day, the Beast reaches out to take a glass of wine that she offers to him and Julie's touch transforms his talons into human hands. The transformation shocks The Beast, who had thought that his cursed appearance was irreversible.

He then reveals his true appearance to Julie the next morning, leaving her overwhelmed by confusion and feelings of betrayal. Although she tries to accept his appearance, she cannot overcome her fear. She goes back home through the magic door, her sisters are shocked that she is still alive. They are amazed by her fancy dresses and jewels she was gifted by the beast. But when they wear then they turn to scraps of torn fabric and mud.

Julie is haunted by The Beast and hears his voice, realizing something is wrong but her father convinces her to stay. The Beast is heartbroken and starts destroying the castle by setting it on fire and seems to accept his fate that he is dying. Julie can not resist the urge to return to The Beast, and she goes back to the forest. At the ruins of the burnt castle, she finds The Beast. She begs him to come back, admitting she does love him and he transforms into the man that she saw from her dream. Then the dream she had comes to life as he carries her in his human form

== Cast ==
- Zdena Studenková as Julie (dubbed by Taťjana Medvecká)
- Vlastimil Harapes as The Beast (dubbed by Jiří Zahajský)
- Václav Voska as Father
- Jana Brejchová as Gábinka
- Zuzana Kocúriková as Málinka (dubbed by Jorga Kotrbová)
- Marta Hrachovinová as The Girl
- Vít Olmer as Rider
- Milan Hein as Groom

== Reception ==
David Melville from Senses of Cinema wrote, "Panna a netvor has the capacity to horrify in the best and the worst of ways. Yet like any true fairy tale, it is unlikely ever to leave its audience bored or indifferent".

== Legacy ==
Beauty and the Beast inspired Lucile Hadžihalilović's 2025 fantasy drama film The Ice Tower. Hadžihalilović said: "There's something in the dark fairy-tale atmosphere, steeped in snow and dread. The framing, the lighting, the unsettling beauty—a blend of surreal and the real within a toxic atmosphere really captured my imagination."

== See also ==
- Beauty and the Beast, a 1740 fairy tale with the same name
- Beauty and the Beast (1946 film), a surrealist fantasy film by French poet, artist, and filmmaker Jean Cocteau
- Beauty and the Beast (1991 film), a Disney movie with the same name
- Beauty and the Beast (2017 film), a live action movie by Disney with the same name
