= Pension pro svobodné pány =

1968 Czechoslovak comedy film

- Directed by: Jiří Krejčík
- Written by: Seán O'Casey
- Screenplay by: Jirí Krejcík
- Produced by: František Milič
- Starring: Josef Abrhám; Iva Janžurová; Jiří Hrzán; Věra Ferbasová; Pavel Landovský
- Cinematography: Rudolf Milič
- Edited by: Josef Dobrichovský
- Music by: Evžen Illín
- Production company: Barrandov Studios
- Release date: 26 April 1968
- Running time: 90 minutes
- Country: Czechoslovakia
- Language: Czech

Pension pro svobodné pány is a 1968 Czechoslovak comedy film directed by Jiří Krejčík. It is based on Seán O'Casey's 1951 short play Bedtime Story.

== Plot ==
Visits by women are strictly prohibited at Miss Mossierová pension for bachelors. Nevertheless, some of the younger tenants cannot resist the temptation and sometimes try to sneak a young lady to their room. The landlady, however, stands guard all night. Bernard Mulligan manages to get his mistress, Andela, to his room and into his bed. But morning is coming and Halibut, Mulligan's roommate, is soon to return home from a party. Mulligan does his best to wake the girl up and get her out. The sleepy Andela, however, instantly grasps that all her lover's tenderness is gone, and begins to torture him maliciously.

== Cast and characters ==
- Josef Abrhám as Mulligan
- Iva Janžurová as Anděla
- Jiří Hrzán as Halibut
- Věra Ferbasová as Miss Mossierová
- Pavel Landovský as tenant
