= Conductor (train crew) =

Train crew member

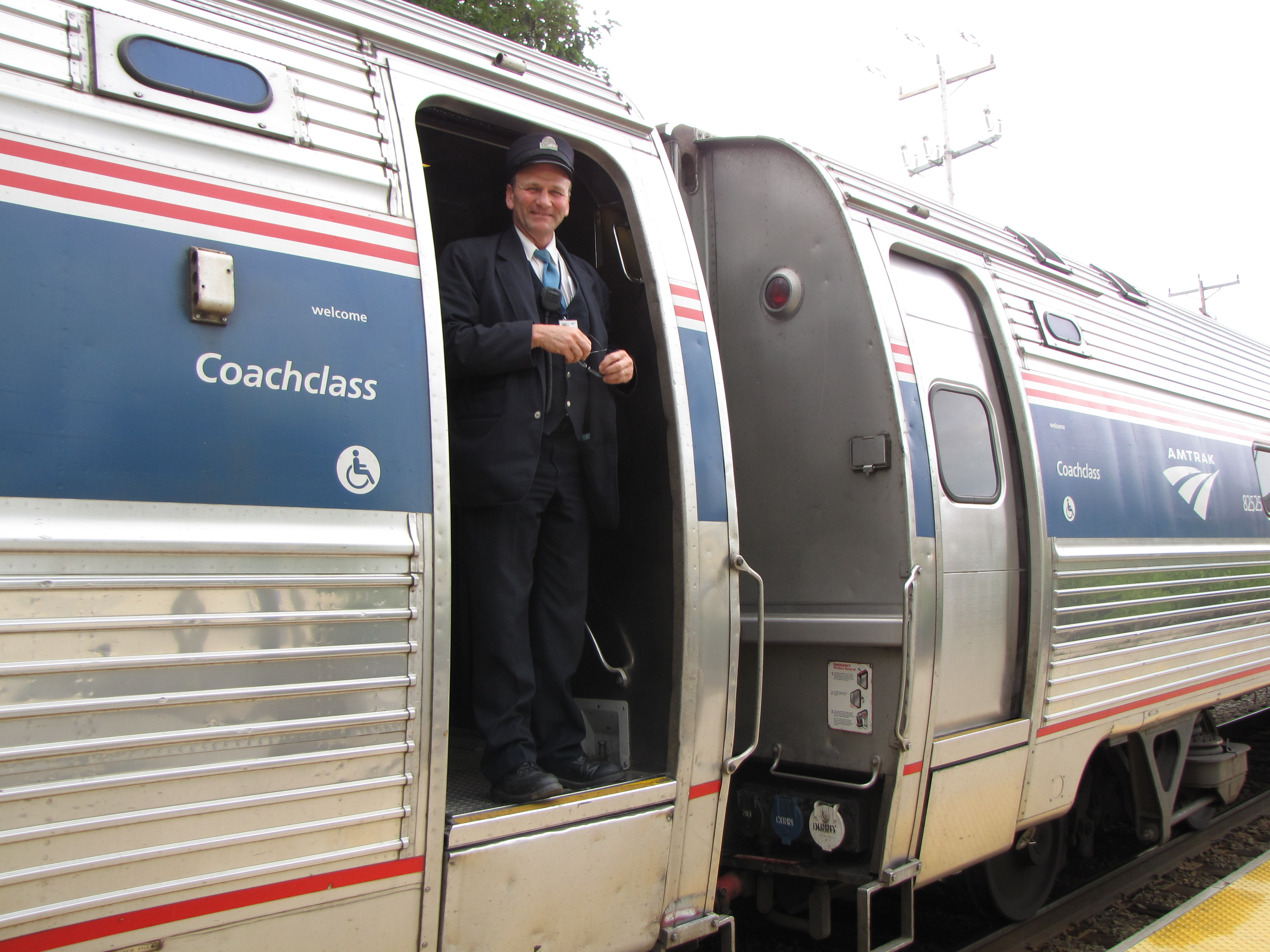
A conductor on an Amtrak train

A conductor, guard (British English), or travelling ticket examiner (Indian English), is a member of a train crew responsible for operational and safety duties. The role is common worldwide under various job titles, although on many railroads, the role has been discontinued. The title conductor is most common in North America, Australia and most other English-speaking countries outside of Great Britain and India, where the title is guard or travelling ticket examiner, respectively.

The responsibilities of the role typically include:

- Ensuring that the train follows applicable safety rules and practices
- Making sure that the train stays on schedule starting from the stations
- Opening and closing power operated doors
- Selling and checking tickets, and other customer-service duties
- Ensuring that any cars and cargo are picked up and dropped off properly
- Completing en-route paperwork
- Directing the train's movement while operating in reverse
- Coupling or uncoupling cars
- Assisting with setting out or picking up rolling stock

Some rapid-transit systems employ conductors to make announcements and open and close doors, duties otherwise performed by train drivers. The conductors often stay in the center of the train, where they have the best view of the platform. However, most rapid-transit systems are driver-only-operated.

== Commuter and freight trains in North America ==
In North America, the conductor manages a freight, passenger, or other type of train, and directly supervises the train crew, which can include a brakeman, flagman, ticket collector, assistant conductor, and on-board service personnel, and is responsible for the movement of the train. The engineer (driver) takes direction from the conductor. The portman (station master), and additional engine crew members (fireman, pilot engineer) share responsibility for safe and efficient train operation and adherence to railway rules and procedures. On some railroads, union contracts specify that a conductor must progress to engineer.

Other duties carried out by the conductor include:

- Jointly coordinate with the engineer and dispatcher the train's movement authority, and verifying this authority is not exceeded
- Communicate and coordinate with other parties—yardmasters, trainmasters, dispatchers, on board service personnel, etc
- Be alert to wayside signals, switch position, and other conditions that affect safe train movement
- Mechanically inspect rolling stock
- Assist the engineer in testing the train's air brakes
- Signal the engineer when to start or stop moving
- Keep a log of the journey
- Check tickets and collect fares on passenger trains
- Keep records of consignment notes and waybills
- Direct, coordinate, and usually manually perform, shunting or switching

Passenger trains may employ one or more brakemen/assistant conductors who assist the conductor and engineer in the safe and prompt movement of the train, to share the workload, and accept delegated responsibility. If a train crew's route, or tour of duty, exceeds a single shift, or conflicts with a legal or contractual limit on the number of work hours, more than one crew may be assigned, each with his own brakeman/assistant conductor. On-board service crew members on passenger trains normally remain on duty for the entire run, including assigned meal and sleep breaks.

Since nearly the beginning of railroading in North America, the conductor on freight trains rode aboard a caboose, along with the rear flagman and the rear brakeman, and performed duties from there. Advances in technology and pressure to reduce operating costs made cabooses redundant, and in most cases, they have been eliminated. This relocated the conductor from the rear of the train to the locomotive (or locomotives) at the head of the train. In most cases, these same conditions gradually eliminated members of the train crew, such as the head brakemen, flagmen, and others.

Most freight trains on most railroads today have a crew of two, one engineer and one conductor. Railroad companies continue to press for reduced operating and labor costs, and this threatens to eliminate second men. Railroads rationalize that since the engineer is already qualified as a conductor, he can easily assume the duties of a conductor. In fact, on most railroads, engineers begin as brakemen, then become conductors, and finally engineers. Some railroads already implement such a strategy, notably the Montana Rail Link, and operate with an engineer and a conductor. However, most railroads are contractually obligated to employ a brakeman/assistant conductor in addition to the engineer, via crew-consist agreements negotiated with the major rail unions, primarily the United Transportation Union. Therefore, eliminating the conductor's position would require that the railroads and unions negotiate a new agreement. If the railroads were successful, conductors already trained and certified as engineers would theoretically be able to work as engineers. Those who have not yet progressed to engineer would have to be trained as engineers as positions became available. Others would have to accept other positions or possibly lose their jobs. The primary union for engineers, the Brotherhood of Locomotive Engineers, does not support this movement, claiming that requiring its members to operate trains alone would be unsafe.

=== Remote control locomotives ===
By the late 1990s, remote-control (RCO) locomotives were increasingly popular on North American railroads for switching duties in rail yards. This system allows the conductor to directly control the locomotive(s) via a wireless remote unit, as opposed to radioing commands to an engineer in the cab. Some Class I rail yards use RCO packs for their conductors, while others do not, depending on the size and type of yard. Class I railroads train conductors on the use of RCO packs with classroom and hands-on instruction, culminating with on-the-job training and certification as an RCO operator. Currently, Class I railroads such as Norfolk Southern require RCO-qualified conductors to work from job boards that perform RCO operations exclusively (when in a yard that uses RCO switching).

=== Train hosts ===
As no explicit federal requirement exists for a two-person train crew in the United States, the Utah Transit Authority originally planned their FrontRunner service to be operated by an operator only, with revenue collected by a proof-of-payment system. Before operation began, the FRA required FrontRunner to employ a second crewmember on each train to assist with emergency evacuation, disabled access, and other safety-sensitive situations. FrontRunner classified this job as a "train host", with a focus on customer service rather than railroad operations. Some other services, such as Amtrak's Downeaster, also use train hosts to assist the assistant conductor with nonrevenue-related customer-service duties.

== Subway trains in North America ==
In subway trains, the conductor's basic duties are:

- Verifying train alignment on the platform
- Opening and closing the train doors
- Making announcements
- Observing the platform during departure.

=== Greater Boston ===
All heavy rail trains in the Massachusetts Bay Transportation Authority operate with two-person crews consisting of a motorman and a conductor. The conductor is located in the cab of the second-last car of the train. When a train arrives at a station, the conductor opens the doors using cab controls. Two sets of controls are provided on each side of the cab for this purpose. The two door zone are one set of controls operating the doors in the conductor's car and the doors forward of that car, and the other set of controls operating the doors to the rear of the conductor's car. When passengers have completed boarding or exiting, the conductor looks forward and closes the doors forward of their cab. This process is repeated for the doors to the rear of the conductor's cab. A door chime is used to notify the passengers that the doors are closing.

=== New York City ===
The Metropolitan Transportation Authority (New York City) transit system operates trains using two-person crews consisting of a motorman and conductor. The conductor is located in the middle of the train and is responsible for opening the doors and closing them. When a train arrives at a station, the conductor verifies the train alignment on the platform by observing a black-and-white "zebra board" mounted to the platform wall or ceiling. When a train is aligned properly, the six-foot-long zebra board should be located directly opposite of the conductor's cab.

Before opening the doors, the train conductors are to open the cab window and point to the zebra board with their index fingers to confirm the stop position to the motorman. The doors, operated from a control panel located on the appropriate side of the car, are opened once the alignment verification is made. Like MBTA, two separate controls are used for the doors, those forward of the conductor and those to the rear of the conductor.

After the doors are opened, the conductors stick their heads out the window to observe passenger boarding and exiting. The doors stay open for at least 10 seconds, and when the conductor decides to close the doors, the conductor announces a door-closing warning using a public address system (PA) on the train. When the platform is clear, the conductor closes the doors in the rear cars. When a locked-door signal is received, the conductor closes the doors in the forward section of the train. Door chimes warn passengers that the doors are closing. When all the doors are closed, the conductor removes the door key, which alerts the motorman that proceeding is safe.

As the train departs the station, the conductor observes the platform for a distance of three car lengths. Station departure observations are made to ensure that no passenger or item is trapped between the doors and is dragged along the platform. The conductor is required to observe the forward and rear cars at least twice during these observations.

=== Port Authority Trans-Hudson ===
Each PATH train operates with a two-person crew consisting of a motorman and conductor. The conductor is responsible for door operation and making announcements. The conductor is located in the rear end of the first car.

When a train enters a station, the conductor opens the doors from a control panel on the appropriate side of the car. Of the two separate controls, one operates just the doors in the conductor's car, and another operates the rest of the doors. As the doors open, the conductor opens the cab window to observe passenger boarding and exiting. After a preliminary observation that the doors are clear, the conductor uses the train's PA to warn passengers that the train doors are closing. When the doors are observed to be clear, the conductor closes the doors in his car. When the locked-door signal is received, the rear car doors are closed. When all the doors are closed, the conductor removes the door key, which tells the motorman to proceed. The conductor then observes the platform until the train has left the station.

=== Chicago ===
Traditionally, an Chicago "L" motorman would operate the train, and a conductor would open/close the doors and make station announcements. However, with the opening of the Yellow Line in 1964, the Chicago Transit Authority (CTA) began phasing out conductors. All lines were converted to one-person operation by 1998, making the CTA the first transit agency in the nation to do so system wide. The elimination of conductors saved an estimated $13.8 million, and most were retrained as customer-service representatives at stations or as supervisors.

=== Toronto ===
The Toronto Transit Commission (TTC) is somewhat different because its heavy rail lines use a combination of single-person and two-person crews. On the TTC's Line 1 and Line 2, trains operate with a crew of two train operators, consisting of a motorman and a conductor. The employees who perform these roles are cross-trained, and switch roles each time a train reaches the end of a line and needs to reverse direction. The conductor is responsible for door control and observation, and is located in the rear cab of the last car in a train. A trainline buzzer system is used to notify the motorman that proceeding is safe.

After arrival at a station and before opening the doors, the conductor verifies the train alignment by observing a green triangle placed on the station wall. The green triangle marks the stopping location of the conductor, and should be directly in front of the conductor's cab. The conductors are required to confirm the stop position to the motorman by pointing out the cab window at the green triangle with their index finger.

One set of door controls is provided in the cab to close all the doors at once. A door opening chime is played when the doors open. The conductors stick their heads out the cab window to observe the platform and doors, and when the doors are clear, they press a button that closes the doors. At exactly the same time, door-closing chimes are played, followed by an automated announcement of "please stand clear of the doors". The conductors use the buzzer to notify the motorman that the train can proceed.

When the train begins to leave the station, the conductors observe the platform with their heads out the window. An orange triangle, placed on the platform wall, marks the location where the conductors may cease platform departure observations and pull their heads back into the cab. It is a safety precaution to watch the platform to make sure that no passenger is being dragged by the train into the tunnel.

== Train guard (Australia, New Zealand and United Kingdom) ==
=== Australia and New Zealand ===
In Australia and New Zealand, the person responsible for operation of a train was called the guard, a term derived from stagecoach days. Guards on passenger trains in those countries did not have responsibilities for ticket inspection or sale; they were responsible for the safe operation of the train, timekeeping, and handling parcels and other consignments. They were trained in emergency protection duties and first aid, using emergency equipment such as detonators, track circuit clips and flags, to protect their train in the event that it became disabled. However, starting about the 1980s the role of guards has been eliminated as a result of improved radio communication, flashing rear-end devices and electronic technology; passenger train conductors have been assigned more responsibility, of which on-train ticket sales and inspection are only a part. Currently in Australia, depending largely on state-based railway practice, there is usually a combination of driver-only operated trains and trains with a guard (who when cab-based, is sometimes termed an observer).

The US title conductor was applied to an employee on passenger trains who inspected or – for passengers who boarded at unstaffed stations – sold tickets on board. Occasionally a ticket inspector would board the train to independently check tickets and the conductor's documentation.

==== New South Wales ====
All passenger trains in New South Wales operate with a driver and guard. Guards were removed from freight trains in the 1980s, but they still operate with a two-man locomotive crew.

===== Greater Sydney area =====
Sydney Trains, which operates metropolitan trains, and intercity trains, have a train guard. Guards are ultimately responsible for the safety of all passengers on the train. They control the operation of doors and the train public address system, perform platform duties, provide basic customer service, ensure the train runs to schedule, and accept and deliver internal mail. On Sydney Trains, the guard is located in the middle of older trains, but on the newer Waratah trains, and on certain intercity services, they work from the rear. The guard is not responsible for inspecting tickets, a role performed by Transport Officers and NSW Police.

===== NSW regional trains =====
On NSW TrainLink regional Xplorer and XPT services the train guard is known as a Passenger Service Supervisor (PSS). While still responsible for the safety of passengers, the PSS is also in charge of delivering customer service and a number of value-add functions on the train including ticket inspections and manning the cafe alongside Passenger Attendants. On Xplorer trains, the driver operates the doors when the PSS gives clearance to depart. On XPT trains, the PSS performs the platform duties of a guard in conjunction with the driver.

==== Queensland ====
Passenger trains are operated by Queensland Rail, and all have both a driver and guard for suburban passenger services, or a passenger services supervisor for long-distance services.

==== Victoria ====
Trains in metropolitan Melbourne have been driver-only since the early 1990s. When the city's rail franchise was offered to the current operator, Metro Trains Melbourne, a proposal existed to reinstate guards on some peak train services, but that option was rejected in favour of hiring additional platform staff.

Regional trains operated by V/Line have a driver and conductor. The conductor performs platform duties and, on locomotive-hauled services, operates the train doors and handles passenger luggage. Conductors are responsible for internal mail, passenger safety and assistance, including on board announcements, and perform ticket sales and inspection duties.

==== South Australia ====
Adelaide Metro's metropolitan rail network is configured for driver-only operation, but also operate with passenger service assistants (PSAs). This is a safety role, but has a focus on customer service and revenue protection. Normally, the train driver operates the doors, but PSAs are also able to. The Ghan, Great Southern, Indian Pacific and The Overland all have so-called train managers.

==== Western Australia ====
Transperth trains are all driver-only operated.

=== New Zealand ===
In New Zealand, inner-city commuter rail networks are staffed by a driver and a train manager (guard) as a minimum.

In Wellington, where ticketing is still paper-based, each train has between one and three passenger operators (ticket collectors). The exact number of passenger operators depends on how many multiple units or carriages make up the train.

In Auckland, off-board ticketing and smartcard systems have reduced the staff level to driver and train manager only. Auckland train managers are now not responsible for revenue on trains, as Revenue Protection officers carry out these roles.

=== United Kingdom ===
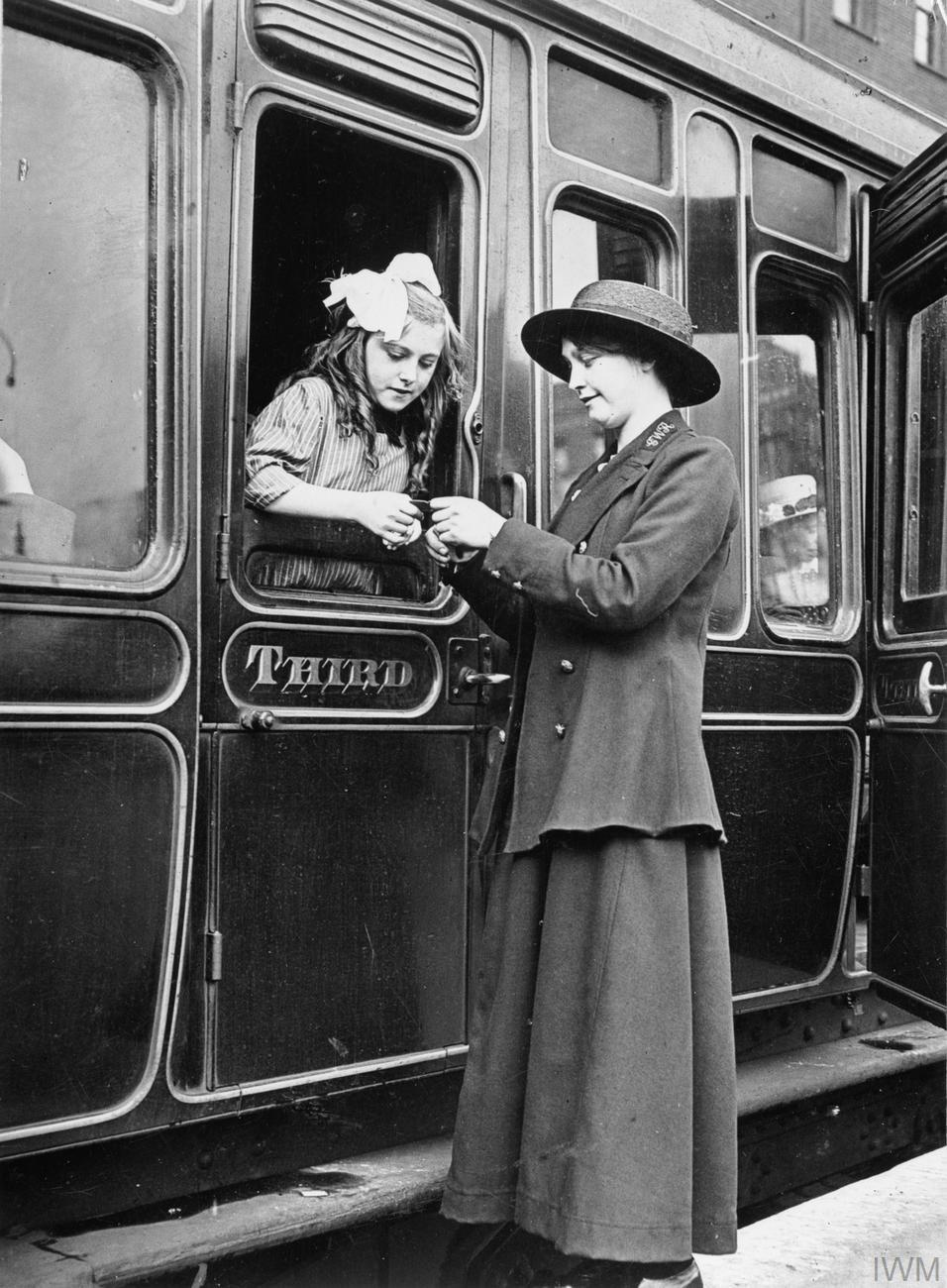
A ticket collector employed by the Great Western Railway during World War I

Under British Rail, there were several grades of guard, depending on whether the guard worked on freight or passenger trains – and a purely operational guard grade worked freight and passenger trains without customer contact. When the guard has significant customer contact, the position is usually classified as conductor-guard or conductor. Since British Rail, there have been a number of titles for a guard's grade but, with a few exceptions, all now perform some sort of customer-facing role, including operating the public address system and train doors.

There have been other disputes over guards on Merseyrail, CrossCountry, Govia Thameslink Railway, South Western Railway, Northern Rail, First Great Western, ScotRail, most of which have been won by the workforce and their union, the RMT.

In the UK, guard duties include:

- opening and closing train doors
- checking tickets (most train operating companies)
- keeping passengers informed of any short-notice changes to the service and keeping the driver informed of any changes
- dealing with an emergency and being trained in personal track safety so that the guard is able to safely evacuate all passengers from the train – including using equipment such as paddles, short circuit bars, and track circuit operating clips
- small repairs of the train such as changing a blown shoe fuse
- historically, to assist with braking on freight trains not fitted with continuous brakes, by applying the handbrake in the brake van.

It was a well-known British tradition for a guard to have two signal flags: a red one to signal the driver to stop, and a green one to signal the driver to depart. Nowadays, these flags are seldom used except on heritage railways. At night, the guard gave the signals using a lamp with red and green lights instead of using flags. Guards still occasionally use a whistle to attract the driver's attention and to warn passengers that the train is about to move, even though the electronic communication systems are now very sophisticated.

On long-distance British expresses, the conductor's title is sometimes enhanced to senior conductor, in line with the implied prestige of operating those trains. Historically, under British Rail, long-distance intercity trains were normally worked by the most senior guards at the depot, hence the name senior conductor. Several more recent private UK passenger train operators have renamed the senior conductor's passenger-facing title to "train manager". The RSSB rulebook still refers collectively to those individuals as guards.

On UK railways, modernisation and economic pressure has led to some trains losing their guards and becoming driver-only-operated (DOO). The most recent axing of the conventional guard was on Southern Rail, after a two-year dispute between the train operating company and the workforce, which ultimately led to the guards losing their safety-critical roles, but retaining their other duties as an on-board supervisor. British Rail first introduced DOO on some commuter services in London and Glasgow, as well as on almost all non-passenger trains. The last London Underground trains to operate with guards were the 1959 stock used on the Northern Line; following their withdrawal on 27 January 2000, all trains on the London Underground have been DOO.

In 2003, a controversial amendment to the UK operational rule book moved part of the guard's safety and operational role to the driver. With rail service privatisation, train operating companies attempted to bring in DOO to other network areas, c2c operating from London Fenchurch Street is an example of that. Currently, several titles describe a guard: train manager, train host or conductor. South Western Railway and Merseyrail still use the term guard. The role of the guard is set out by a mixture of the Railway Rule Book and train operating companies.

== Conductors/guards in Europe ==
=== Germany ===
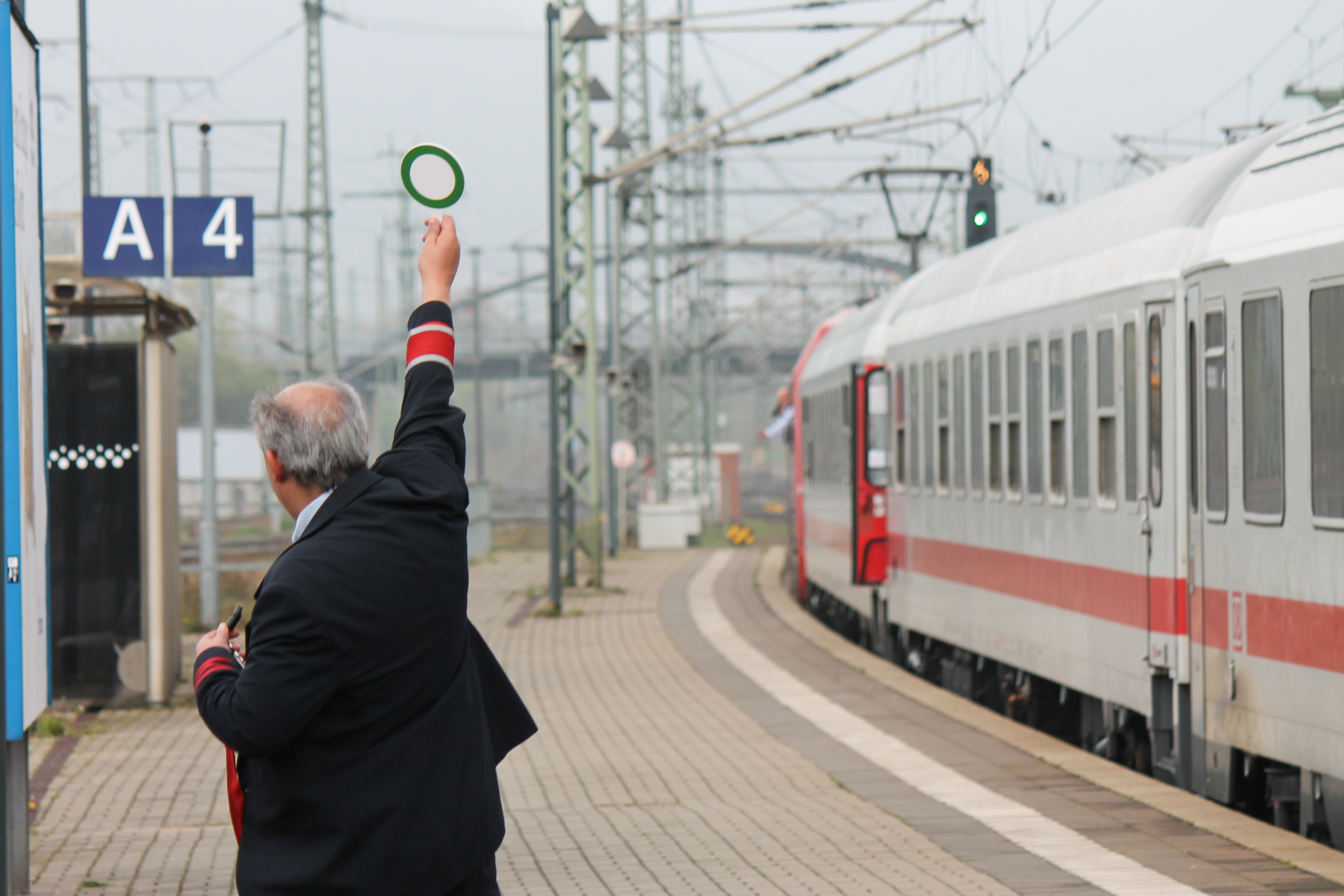
German conductor signaling for the departure of a train. The red armband on his uniform identifies him as a conductor.

A conductor (Zugführer or Zugchef in German) supervises the operational safety of a train and is responsible for its proper operation. They are authorized to issue instructions to all employees, for example train attendants, on the train. The conductor also provides passenger service and checks tickets together with the train attendants.

The conductor determines if a train is ready to depart from a platform and orders the engineer to depart via visual or aural signals. Conductors are trained in coupling and uncoupling cars, operating of the brakes, calculating braking power for the engineer, and other technical subjects related to the cars. They are further trained in customer services and selling and checking tickets.

On local trains, and depending on the level of automations, the duties of a conductor can be taken over by other personnel or left to automatic systems.

=== Hungary ===
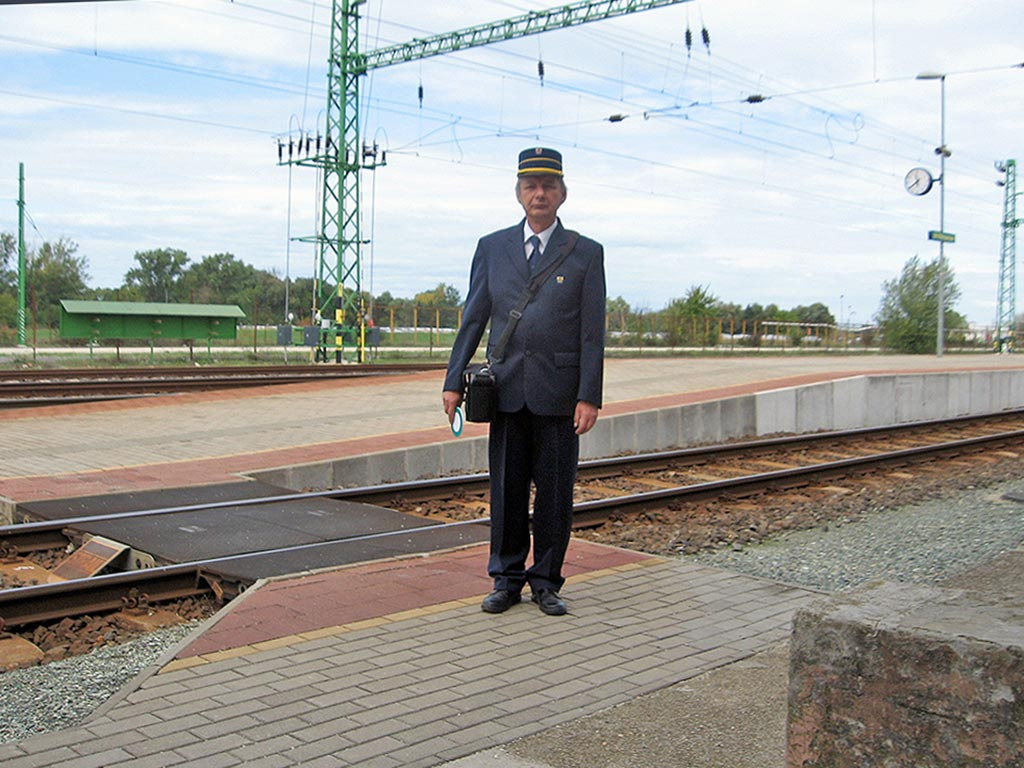
Hungarian MÁV conductor

In Hungary a conductor may assist the train driver in testing the train's air brakes, and sometimes they have to lead the shunting, mostly when the trains are switching lines. Hungarian train conductors are responsible for the departure of the trains. In each station they give the permission to move on by giving a ready signal to the train driver. During the day they use a disc (which is white and has a green border) to give the ready signal to the train driver.

After sunset they give signals with flashlights. Train drivers are not allowed to move the train without the conductor in chief giving them the ready signal. Conductors, along with train drivers, are responsible for keeping the trains on schedule. There is always at least one conductor in chief on passenger trains in Hungary. No passenger trains may depart without one, as only they have the right to give the departure signal.

Some longer trains may have additional conductors who are under the command of the conductor in chief. If there is more than one conductor on a train, then the signal procedure is as follows:

After all passengers have left or entered the train and the departure time has arrived, the conductor in chief asks the other conductor for his ready signal. If it is safe to depart he gives a ready signal to the conductor in chief who then gives the same signal to the train driver.

As in Belgium and in the Netherlands conductors also collect and punch tickets, fine people for not having a valid fare and make announcements to the passengers. They also sell tickets on the trains; if the passengers have entered the train at a station where a ticket office is operating they can buy a ticket only with payment of a fine. However, if the passengers got on at a station or stop where they didn't have an option to buy a ticket, they can buy from the conductor without having to pay a fine.

=== Ireland ===
Most Iarnród Éireann trains are driver-only operated. An on-board train host provides passengers with assistance, makes announcements, and performs minor maintenance. A minority of routes still have guards operating the doors, giving the ready-to-start signal with a green flag, and checking and selling tickets.

=== Netherlands/Belgium ===
In Belgium and The Netherlands, train conductors have multiple tasks involving train safety and customer services. Belgian/Dutch train conductors are responsible for the departure of the train. In each station they give the permission to move on by giving a ready signal to the train driver. Therefore, train conductors in Belgium and The Netherlands always close (and in some scenarios also open) the doors. They are also responsible for performing safety tasks in case of an emergency or accident, such as fire, evacuation, etc. Because of these tasks, there has to be at least one conductor on each passenger train; a train without a conductor is uncommon, but still appears on some regional Dutch trains. The departure trains always have one conductor who is conductor-in-chief. He is responsible for the entire train, the on-board crew and the passengers. Some longer trains may have additional conductors who are under command of the conductor-in-chief. Besides the safety tasks, conductors also collect and punch tickets, fine people for not having a valid fare and make announcements to the passengers.

=== Switzerland ===
Conductors in Switzerland are assigned to either regional or long-distance trains. In the former case, their job is mainly to check for tickets (and to issue a "ticket supplement" in the event of a missing or incorrect ticket) or to assist customers with inquiries. In the latter case, they are responsible not only for the same tasks, but also for preparing the train for departure, making announcements, signaling the closing of the doors and departure from each station, and assisting customers in the event of a security incident.

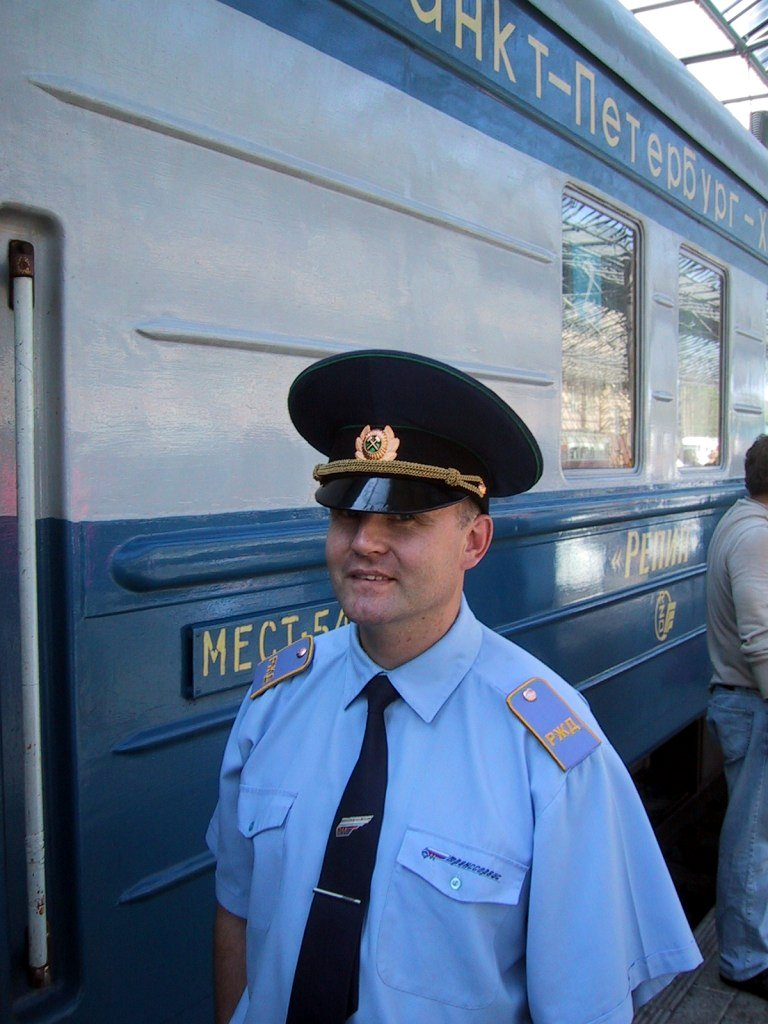
A Russian train conductor in front of the express train "Repin"

== Railway guards in Asia ==
=== India ===
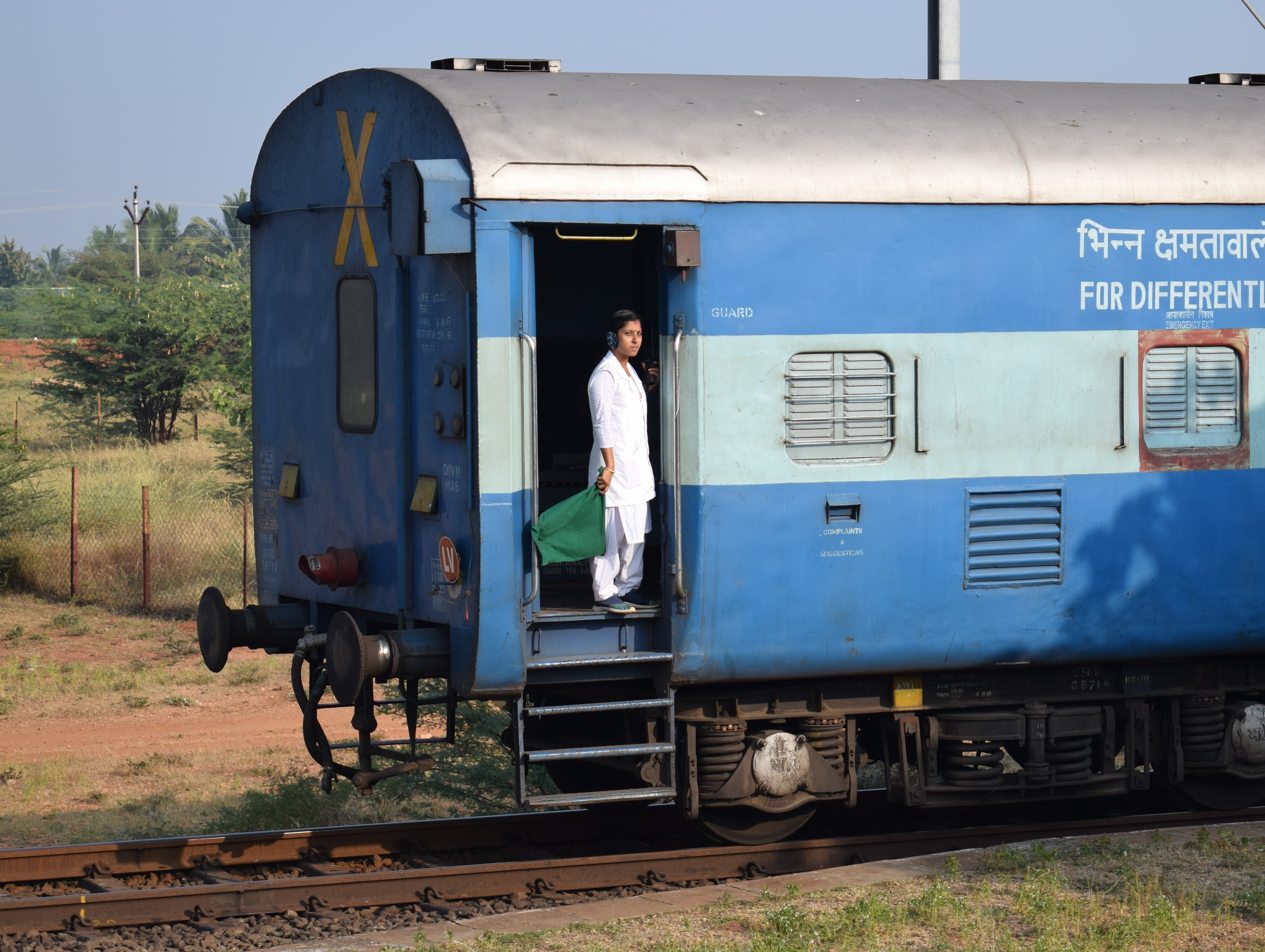
A guard on an Indian Railways passenger train.

In India, train managers (earlier called guard) are posted on all passenger trains and goods trains and no passenger-carrying train is allowed to move without a guard. The passenger train guard, generally called a mail guard, is completely responsible for the train, its schedule, and safety of passengers and the locomotive pilot. These guards wear a specific uniform (generally white).

During the day, the guard uses the traditional green flag to signal the pilot to depart, and the red flag to stop, assisted by two-way radios. After sunset, the guard uses lamp signals in place of the flags. A couple of minutes before signalling departure to the pilot, the guard blows a whistle to warn passengers to board the train. After ensuring all passengers are safe to travel, the guard signals the green flag by waving it from the brake van. In an emergency, the guard uses the red flag to indicate a stop, and may directly apply brakes to stop the train. The pilot is not allowed to move the train without a signal from the guard, as the guard is in charge of the train.

Passenger guards also accept heavy parcels and luggage boxes that passengers cannot carry in coaches. Some perishable goods like vegetables and milk are also transported under the supervision of the guard, who is responsible for proper loading and unloading.

Keeping the passenger train on-schedule is an important guard function. Guards carry a first aid box with their belongings, along with other important items, all in a medium-sized duty box (generally painted red). The name, designation and base location of the Guard are printed in white on the box. A designated passenger train, halting at all stations, carries a large heavy cast iron cash safe in the guard's brake van, where cash receipts from ticket sales is deposited in a leather pouch by the station manager (earlier called the station master). Since the late 1990s, each guard is provided with a two-way radio so that they can communicate with the locomotive pilot, and other trains if required. The radio has not yet replaced the traditional red and green flags.

=== Japan ===
Guards are used on most passenger railway lines in Japan. Working from the rear driving cab, their responsibilities include opening and closing of doors, sounding the departure melody, making announcements, ensuring on-time departure as well as the safety of passengers boarding and alighting.

== Tram (streetcar) conductor ==
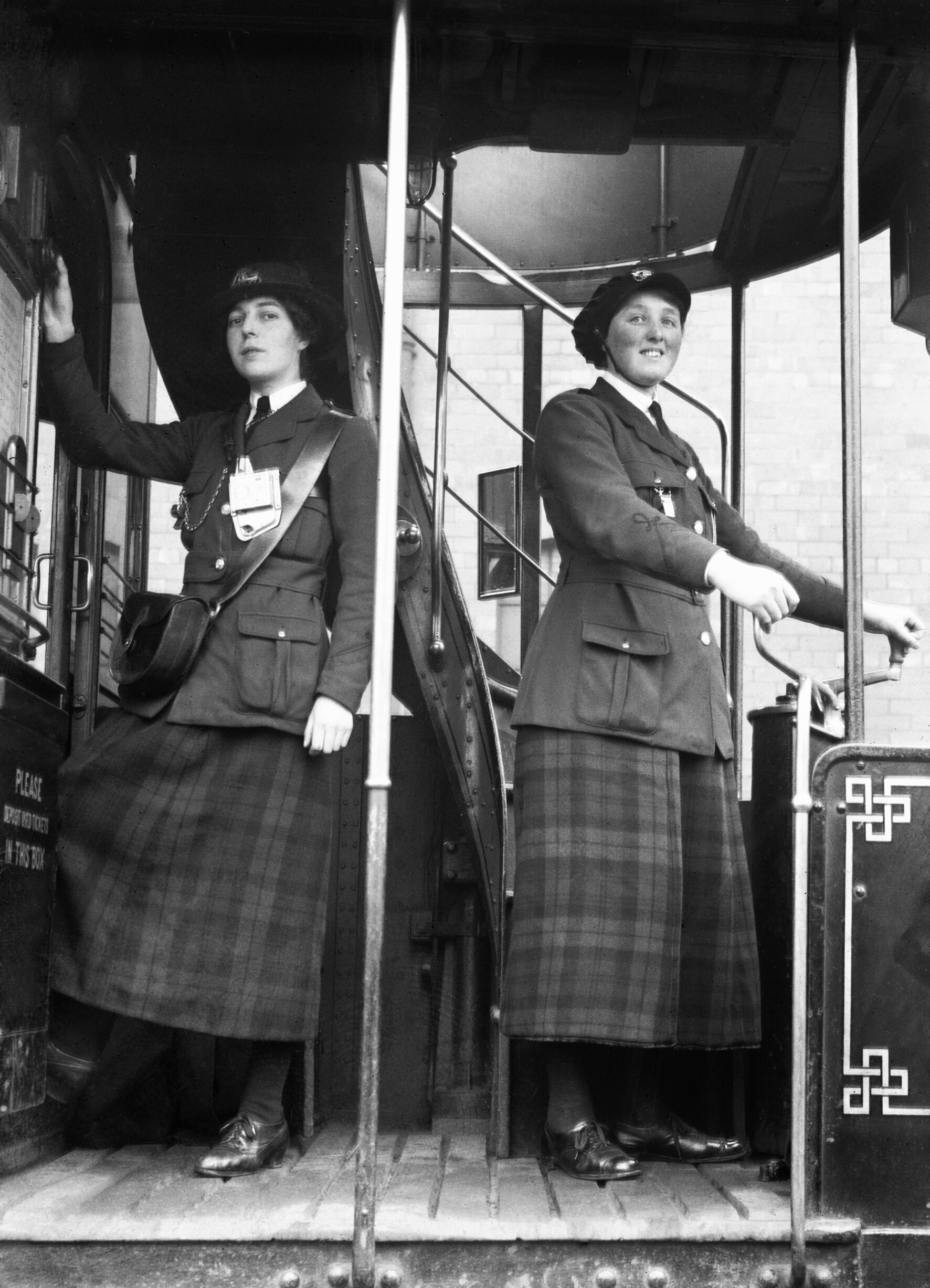
A conductor (left) and tram driver, Glasgow, 1918

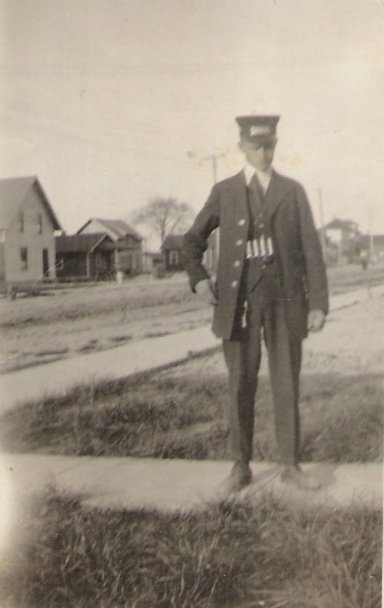
Streetcar conductor 1919 in Flint, Michigan

Many antique or heritage trams (streetcars), which operated through the earlier part of the 20th century, were designed for operation by a crew of two or more. The conductor primarily collected fares and signaled the driver when safe to depart from stopping places. The conductor also assisted with shunting when necessary, changing the trolley pole and attended to passengers' needs.

Modern vehicle design and ticketing arrangements have largely eliminated the need for conductors on street railways and light rail systems. In recent years a number of modern tram or light rail systems have introduced (or re-introduced) conductors to minimise fare evasion and to provide customer care, supervision and security functions, even in situations where a second crew member is not strictly needed.

In England, the Sheffield Supertram and West Midlands Metro modern light rail systems have both started using conductors due to problems with ticket machine reliability. Nottingham Express Transit started with conductors, but now sells tickets from ticket machines or online. Manchester Metrolink and Croydon Tramlink both rely on ticket machines at stops.

Systems of ticket checking and selling by a conductor:

- takes place while entering, the vehicle cannot leave until this is (almost) finished
- takes place after entering an entrance lobby, while the vehicle already moves, after which the passenger moves to the seating area of the car
- the passengers get seated and the conductor comes to them

Modern mass transit systems which operate with conductors on trams include:

| System | Location |
|---|---|
| Glenelg tram line | Adelaide, Australia |
| GVB Amsterdam | Amsterdam, Netherlands |
| West Midlands Metro | Birmingham/Wolverhampton, England |
| Blackpool tramway | Blackpool, England - on pre-World War II vehicles |
| RET | Rotterdam, Netherlands |
| Sheffield Supertram | Sheffield, England |
| Spårväg City | Stockholm, Sweden |

== See also ==
- AEC Routemaster
- Bus conductor
- Freight conductor
- Manual fare collection
- New Routemaster
- Railroad engineer
- Revenue Protection Inspector
