= Day for My Love =

1976 film

- Directed by: Juraj Herz
- Written by: Markéta Zinnerová
- Starring: Eva Sitta
- Cinematography: Jiří Macháně
- Edited by: Jaromír Janáček
- Music by: Petr Hapka
- Release date: 1976
- Running time: 91 minutes
- Country: Czechoslovakia
- Language: Czech

Day for My Love (Czech: Den pro mou lásku) is a 1976 Czechoslovak drama film directed by Juraj Herz. It was entered into the 27th Berlin International Film Festival.

== Cast ==
- Eva Sitta as Hanka (as Eva Píchová)
- Milada Černá
- Emma Černá
- Lubomír Černík as Kabát
- Vlastimil Harapes
- Jan Hartl as Mirek
- Jaroslav Heyduk as Bernard
- Sylva Kamenická
- Zofie Kanyzová-Veselá as Helena
- Dana Medřická as Petr's mother
- Jitka Nováková
- Jiřina Šejbalová
- Karel Smyczek
- Zdeněk Srstka as Man in the Pub
- Eva Svobodová as Cleaning woman
- Marta Vančurová
