= Oil Lamps (film) =

1971 Czechoslovak drama film

- Theatrical poster
- Directed by: Juraj Herz
- Written by: Meir Dohnal; Jaroslav Havlíček; Juraj Herz; Václav Šašek
- Starring: Iva Janžurová, Petr Čepek
- Cinematography: Dodo Simoncic
- Edited by: Jaromír Janáček
- Release date: 5 November 1971
- Running time: 101 minutes
- Country: Czechoslovakia
- Language: Czech

Oil Lamps (Czech: Petrolejové lampy) is a 1971 Czechoslovak drama film directed and co-written by Juraj Herz. It competed in the 1972 Cannes Film Festival. It is based on a novel by Jaroslav Havlíček.

== Plot ==
In a small Czech town named Jilemnice lives a brave and jovial woman Štěpa Kiliánová, who enjoys her independent life but also desires to marry and have a family. The latter proves difficult as most potential suitors do not find her to be matching ideals of a 1900s wife. Out of excessive trust and desire to marry, she marries her cousin, a sardonic, reclusive man, former lieutenant and gambler Pavel Malina, whose only wish is to find peace and forget the past. Meanwhile the groom's father and older brother are interested in Štěpa's inheritance to save their farm from ruin. The couple live through unrequited love, dislike and disappointment on Štěpa's side, since her husband does not consummate the marriage because of his impotence, due to the syphilis he caught during his excessive life-style time in the army.

== Cast ==
- Iva Janžurová as Štěpa Kiliánová
- Petr Čepek as Pavel Malina
- Marie Rosůlková as Mother
- Ota Sklenčka as Father
- Vladimír Jedenáctík as Uncle
- Karel Černoch as Synáček
- Jaroslav Blažek as Trakl
- Václav Vondráček as Tabetic Machoň
