= Coach to Vienna =

1966 Czechoslovak war film

- Directed by: Karel Kachyňa
- Written by: Jan Procházka; Karel Kachyňa
- Starring: Iva Janžurová; Jaromír Hanzlík; Luděk Munzar
- Cinematography: Josef Illík
- Edited by: Miroslav Hájek
- Music by: Jan Novák
- Distributed by: Ústřední půjčovna filmů
- Release date: 11 November 1966
- Running time: 78 minutes
- Country: Czechoslovakia
- Languages: Czech; German; Russian
- Budget: 1,450,000 Kčs

Coach to Vienna (Czech: Kočár do Vídně; in USA released as Carriage to Vienna) is a 1966 Czechoslovak war drama directed by Karel Kachyňa. The film was awarded the third prize at Karlovy Vary Film Festival in 1966, however it was also denounced as "disgraceful ideological mischief", anti-Czech, anti-German and anti-partisan by some critics. The film was banned from distribution after Warsaw Pact invasion of Czechoslovakia in 1968.

== Plot ==
In Czechoslovakia at the beginning of May 1945, retreating German forces hang the husband of Krista for a petty offence. After the funeral, a German deserter named Hans orders her at gunpoint to take him and Günther, his dying comrade, south through the forests to Vienna. In her horse-drawn wagon she drives them along a network of tracks that eventually lead north towards the advancing Russians. Though Hans tries to be friendly, she treats him with contempt and whenever she sees an opportunity she throws the men's weapons into the brush, until all they have left is one rifle. In the distance they hear church bells, so Hans correctly assumes that the war is over and rips the insignia off his uniform. Krista, however, still wants revenge and remains obdurate. Eventually losing patience with her, Hans throws her off the wagon but she follows at a distance. Night falls and Günther dies, so Hans laboriously buries him in the stony soil and falls asleep exhausted. Krista creeps up in stockinged feet but when face to face cannot bring herself to kill him. Dawn comes and a troop of Czech partisans creep up to the wagon, to see Hans and Krista asleep together inside. After torturing the German, they kill him.

== Cast ==
- Iva Janžurová as Krista, the widow
- Jaromír Hanzlík as Austrian soldier Hans
- Luděk Munzar as injured soldier Günther
- Vladimír Ptáček as Partisan
- Ivo Niederle as Partisan
- Jiří Žák as Partisan
- Zdeněk Jarolímek as Partisan
- Ladislav Jandoš as Partisan
