= Rudolf Wessely =

Austrian actor

- Born: 19 January 1925; Vienna, Austria
- Died: 25 April 2016 (aged 91); Munich, Germany
- Occupation: Actor
- Years active: 1966－2010

Rudolf Wessely (19 January 1925 – 25 April 2016) was an Austrian actor.

== Partial filmography ==
- Guten Tag, lieber Tag (1961) – Strebel
- Wo wir fröhlich gewesen sind (1966, TV Movie) – Lamprett Bellboys
- The Shooting Party (1968, TV Movie) – Dr. Wosnessensky
- Kaddish for the Living (1969, TV Movie) – Bach
- Dear Fatherland Be at Peace (1976) – Wieland
- Strongman Ferdinand (1976)
- Derrick (TV Series, 6 episodes):
  - "Der Fotograf" (1978) – Herr Beer
  - "Schubachs Rückkehr" (1979) – Rudolf Frank
  - "Hanna, liebe Hanna" (1980) – Bächler
  - "Die Schwester" (1981) – Der alte Lehrer / Old teacher
  - "Eine Falle für Derrick" (1982) – Herr Kramer
  - "Ein Spiel mit dem Tod" (1984) – Martin Kussloff
- The Tailor from Ulm (1978) – Pointet
- Das Ding (1979, TV film) – Hans Prehl
- Sunday Children (1980)
- Die kleine Figur meines Vaters (1980) – Walter Henisch
- Lieber Karl (1984) – Kubelka
- Wahnfried (1986) – Schnappauf
- Das Diarium des Dr. Döblinger (1986)
- Kir Royal (1986, TV Series) – Sedlacek
- Follow Me (1989) – Frisör
- Café Europa (1990)
- Der Nachbar (1992) – Rudolf Pawlik
- Inspector Rex (1996, Episode: "Stadt in Angst") – Theo Kern
- Der Bulle von Tölz (1996, Episode: "Tod am Altar") – Bischof
- The Unfish (1997) – Pfarrer
- Comedian Harmonists (1997) – Herr Grunbaum
- Opernball (1998, TV Movie) – Alter Sicherheitsdirektor
- On the Wings of Love (1999) – Prof. Unseld
- Klemperer – Ein Leben in Deutschland (1999, Episode: "Also bleibe ich") – Prof. Abendroth
- Gripsholm (2000) – Chefredakteur / Verleger-Editor / publisher
- Die Manns – Ein Jahrhundertroman (2001, TV Mini-Series) – Alfred Pringsheim
- Tatort (2004, Episode: "Hundeleben") – Herr Kehl
- Schokolade für den Chef (2008, TV Movie) – Willi Mattusch
- Klimawechsel (2010, TV Series)
- Keep Lying, Darling (2010, TV Movie) – Kurt Wegener (final film role)

== Literature ==
- Kotte, Andreas; Gojan, Simone, eds. (2005). Theaterlexikon der Schweiz =: Dictionnaire du théâtre en Suisse = Dizionario teatrale vizzero = Lexicon da teater svizzer. Zürich: Chronos. p. 2084. ISBN 978-3-0340-0715-3. OCLC 62309181.
- Huber, Hermann J., ed. (1986). Langen Müller's Schauspieler-Lexikon der Gegenwart: Deutschland, Österreich, Schweiz. München: Langen Müller. p. 1100. ISBN 978-3-7844-2058-5.
- Sucher, Curt Bernd; Dössel, Christine, eds. (1999). Theaterlexikon. Personen: Autoren, Regisseure, Schauspieler, Dramaturgen, Bühnenbildner, Kritiker / von Christine Dössel. dtv (Orig.-Ausg., völlig neubearb. und erw. 2. Aufl. Red.-Schluß: Februar 1999 ed.). Erscheinungsort nicht ermittelbar. p. 762. ISBN 978-3-423-03322-0.
