= Follow Me (1989 film) =

1989 film

- Directed by: Maria Knilli
- Written by: Ulrich Weiß; Maria Knilli
- Produced by: Monika Aubele, Norbert Schneider
- Starring: Pavel Landovský
- Cinematography: Klaus Eichhammer
- Edited by: Fritz Baumann, Maria Knilli
- Music by: Marran Gosov
- Release dates: July 1989 (Moscow); 2 November 1989 (Germany)
- Running time: 104 minutes
- Country: West Germany
- Language: German

Follow Me is a 1989 East-West drama film directed by the Austrian filmmaker Maria Knilli. It was her second feature film, following her feature film debut with Lieber Karl released in 1984. Follow Me was entered as the official German contribution into the competition of the 16th Moscow International Film Festival in 1989 and had its world premiere there. It was released theatrically in German cinemas on 2 November 1989, one week before the fall of the Berlin Wall. 1990, following the Velvet Revolution, the film was shown at the 27th International Film Festival in Karlovy Vary.

The script was written by Maria Knilli together with the DEFA-filmmaker Ulrich Weiß using the pseudonym Vera Has.

== Plot ==
Pavel Navrátil, who had been teaching philosophy at Prague university, loses his professorship after the Prague Spring. Henceforth he is restricted to working as a gravedigger in a cemetery and lecturing his students secretly. After three years he is tired of this double life and risks starting a new one. He does not do this secretly, instead he makes a theatrical departure from the Czechoslovak police-state. He invites his students to the funeral of a dead man whom he does not know himself and who gets a huge grave-stone with the inscription 'Hrdlicka'. He holds a final secret seminar in his flat which, naturally, is observed. He gives away his philosophy books. He says goodbye to his mother, who still thinks he has not grown up, and to his wife and son who he has already left long ago, And he wishes his ex-colleague and arch-enemy well, knowing that he will not forget him.

Navrátil leaves Prague without any difficulty and starts a new life at an airport somewhere in the West. This new life also consists of a double identity. During the day, he is a baggage-man at the airport and on the evenings and days-off he flies back home in this fantasy. There, he encounters all kinds of different and extravagant people, who all seem just as stranded as he himself: an Austrian violin fanatic, a German-Jewish lady and the melancholic and wise Russian Ljubja, who owns a brothel and employs girls from all over the world. With all of these companions in misfortune he celebrates the festivities of home, picnics full of longing and enchantment. And again and again Navrátil plays flying-to-Prague with the airport barber. He has himself lathered and shaven to the rhythm of the flight calls.

But after five years abroad he flies back to Prague once again to say farewell finally to his home country. With a load of airport falcons and an ingeniously implemented birdmask he manages to jump behind the Iron Curtain. He visits the same places again. The house he lived in, Hrdlicka's grave, which he does not find. Instead he meets a young Russian Red Army Soldier with whom he spends the whole night drinking Vodka and discussing – since neither of them speaks the language of the opposite, they communicate with hands and feet.

At dawn he is picked up by the state police and deported to the West by plane. The authorities' final message before his departure is: "Listen carefully. You were not in Prague. No one saw you. You will forget and we will forget that you exist". The jet leaves Prague. Navrátil returns to the West, with a crying and a laughing eye.

== Cast ==
- Pavel Landovský as Professor Pavel Navrátil
- Marina Vlady as Ljuba
- Rudolf Wessely as Hairdresser
- Ulrich Reinthaller as Milos
- Katharina Thalbach as Judith
- Mark Zak as Soldier
- Hans Jakob as Violinist
- Martin Umbach as Kafka
- Jan-Paul Biczycki as Emigrant
- Jürgen Heinrich as Emigrant
- Tzvetan Marangosoff as Emigrant
- Dominique Horwitz as Western baggage porter
- Karl Friedrich as Uniformed man

== Production ==
=== Development ===
Maria Knilli had been concerned with emigrants since 1983. The impetus to this project had been her encounter with the Czech actor Pavel Landovský who, having been one of the initiators of the petition Charter 77, had been expelled from his home country. He told Knilli about how he once travelled to a shooting from Vienna to Helsinki and was the only passenger who had to stay seated in the plane during its stopover in Prague. There he met a Czech cleaning lady to whom he told his story before the flight continued and he saw „his“ city a last time from far above.

Knilli began writing the screenplay in the summer of 1985 and worked on it for over two years, together with the DEFA-filmmaker Ulrich Weiß, whose co-authorship had long been concealed for political reasons by the alias Vera Has. A typical trademark of Weiß' is the abstinence of any ideology and the universally human point of view. Throughout his career, Weiß had been closely studying the developments in Czechoslovak cinema, particularly the work of Jan Němec and his film A Report on the Party and the Guests.

=== Filming ===
Follow Me was shot in 1988 and completed in 1989. The lead actor Pavel Landovský had been a member of the Wiener Burgtheater and starred in many cinema and television films following his emigration to Austria. Knilli had met him in 1983 when she was working as an assistant director for the Czech filmmaker Vojtěch Jasný during the shooting of the television play See you later, I must shoot myself.

While shooting this film in Helsinki, Knilli also got to know the French actress of Russian descent Marina Vlady who starred together with Landovský and the Polish actor Daniel Olbrychski. Vlady later wrote in her memoirs about Follow Me: „The script is one of the best I had read in years. It’s full of poetry, a poetry of images, a poetry of human relationships.“

== Style ==
Follow Me distinguishes itself through its vast abstinence of linear narration. Instead, the various states of consciousness are visualised through a diversity of formal stylistic devices. Follow Me is like a stream of consciousness, which has to suck the audience into its confidence. The vivid story is forced open. Externally unusual perspectives, views, tours d'horizon, rise up, reality is suspended in favour of the supernatural. There is no interest in simply focusing-in for minutes on end on the finished image, but additional demands are made of the fantasy. What she has to say is at least as poetical as it is political.“

Thus begins a game of signs and images. Knilli explained her approach in an interview at the time of the film’s release: ‘Follow Me‘ is reduced to internals. I have looked for variations at a visual level for the interior condition. (...) I am inclined to consider things from a certain distance. I observe for a long time, and I only work on something which I have observed when I am not embroiled in feelings. I hate mawkishness."
