= Juraj Herz =

Slovak film director (1934–2018)

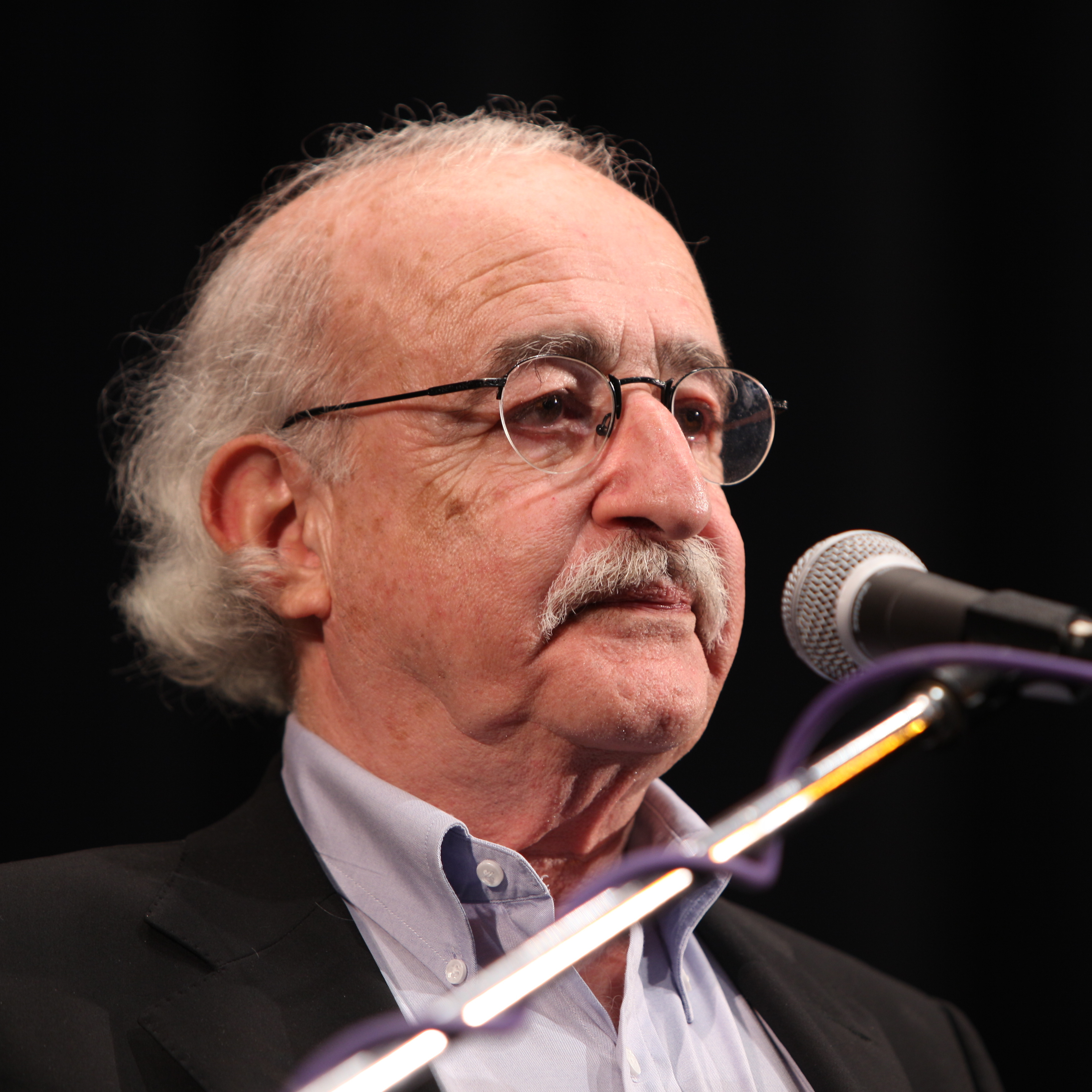
- Herz in 2009
- Born: 4 September 1934; Kežmarok, Czechoslovakia (now Kežmarok, Slovakia)
- Died: 8 April 2018 (aged 83); Prague, Czech Republic
- Occupations: Film director, actor, scene designer
- Years active: 1961–2018

Juraj Herz (4 September 1934 – 8 April 2018) was a Slovak film director, actor, and scene designer, associated with the Czechoslovak New Wave movement of the 1960s. He is best known for his 1969 horror/black comedy The Cremator, often cited as one of the best Czechoslovak films of all time, though many of his other films achieved cult status. He directed for both film and television, and in the latter capacity he directed episodes of a French-Czech television series based on George Simenon's Maigret novels.

== Early life and education ==
Herz was born in 1934 in Kežmarok, in modern-day Slovakia, to Jewish parents. He was a Holocaust survivor, having been imprisoned at the Ravensbrück concentration camp during his childhood. Roughly 60 members of his family perished during the Holocaust, but all of his immediate family members survived. After attending secondary school in Bratislava, he studied photography at the city's University of Applied Arts, going on to study directing and puppetry at the Theatre Faculty of the Academy of Performing Arts in Prague (DAMU) alongside Jan Švankmajer. He remained in Prague after he completed his studies to work at the Semafor Theatre and Barrandov Studios.

== Film career ==
Herz was self-taught as a film director. His first experience working on films was as second-unit director under Zbyněk Brynych (Transport from Paradise; 1962) and Ján Kadár (The Shop on Main Street; 1965). Because he had attended DAMU rather than its sister film school, FAMU, Herz was initially not part of the core group of directors who would form the Czechoslovak New Wave. His 1965 short film The Junk Shop was excluded from the group's manifesto anthology Pearls of the Deep (1966) due to its running time.

Herz made his breakthrough with his 1969 film, The Cremator, based on a novel by Ladislav Fuks, starring Czech actor Rudolf Hrušínský as a demented crematorium manager who collaborates with the Nazis during World War II. The film was selected as the Czechoslovak entry for the Best Foreign Language Film at the 42nd Academy Awards, but was not accepted as a nominee. In 1972, it won the Festival de Cine de Sitges Best Film award, as well as awards for Hrušínský and cinematographer Stanislav Milota. Immediately banned by Communist censors after its premiere, The Cremator was not seen again in Czechoslovakia until after the Velvet Revolution in 1989, but achieved wide international acclaim and cult status. It was re-released in 2017. The film combined horror and black comedy, and is often cited as one of the best movies ever made in Czechoslovakia.

The following year saw Sweet Games of Last Summer, an expressionist adaptation of Guy de Maupassant.

Herz was best known for his work in the horror genre; he was one of the few Czechoslovak film directors working horror films during the Communist period. His other horror works included 1972 murder drama Morgiana and a gothic re-interpretation of the fairy tale Beauty and the Beast (Czech: Panna a Netvor) in 1978. Herz's 1971 drama Oil Lamps (Czech: Petrolejové Lampy) was in competition for the Palme D'Or at the 1972 Cannes Film Festival. Herz's 1976 film Day for My Love, a drama about the death of a child, was entered into the 27th Berlin International Film Festival.

Herz intended to make an adaptation of Alfred Jarry's absurd erotic novel Supermale but was forced to shelve it by the government.

His 1982 movie Ferat Vampire (Czech: Upír z Feratu), a horror movie about a murderous Ferat sports car fuelled on human blood, starred Jiří Menzel and future first lady Dagmar Havlová. In 1986 Herz released The Night Overtakes Me, a tragic drama about his experiences in the concentration camp.

Herz emigrated to Germany in 1987. His last major films were paranormal thriller Darkness (Czech: T.M.A.; 2009), and Habermann (2010), a war drama about the expulsion of Germans from Czechoslovakia after World War II.

== Style ==
Herz was very interested in genre films, especially horror. He was very interested in dark, macabre elements and themes and also erotic imagery, which genre films allowed him to incorporate. Herz also frequently used psychological horror and politically dissident elements in his films. He said that dark humor was a form of expression, and that even serious films should be laughed at.

== Death ==
Herz died in Prague on 8 April 2018, aged 83. His death was announced on Facebook by Slovak actor Andrej Hryc, his friend and long-time collaborator.

== Selected filmography ==
- The Junk Shop (Sběrné surovosti, 1965)
- The Sign of Cancer (Znamení raka, 1965)
- The Cremator (Spalovač mrtvol, 1969)
- Sweet Games of Last Summer (Sladké hry minulého leta, 1970)
- Oil Lamps (Petrolejové lampy, 1971)
- Morgiana (1972)
- Day for My Love (Den pro mou lásku, 1976)
- Beauty and the Beast (Panna a netvor, 1978)
- The Ninth Heart (Deváté srdce, 1979)
- Ferat Vampire (Upír z Feratu, 1982)
- The Night Overtakes Me (Zastihla Mě Noc, 1986)
- Darkness (T.M.A., 2009)
- Habermann (Habermannův mlýn, 2010)
