= Droužkovice =

- Municipality
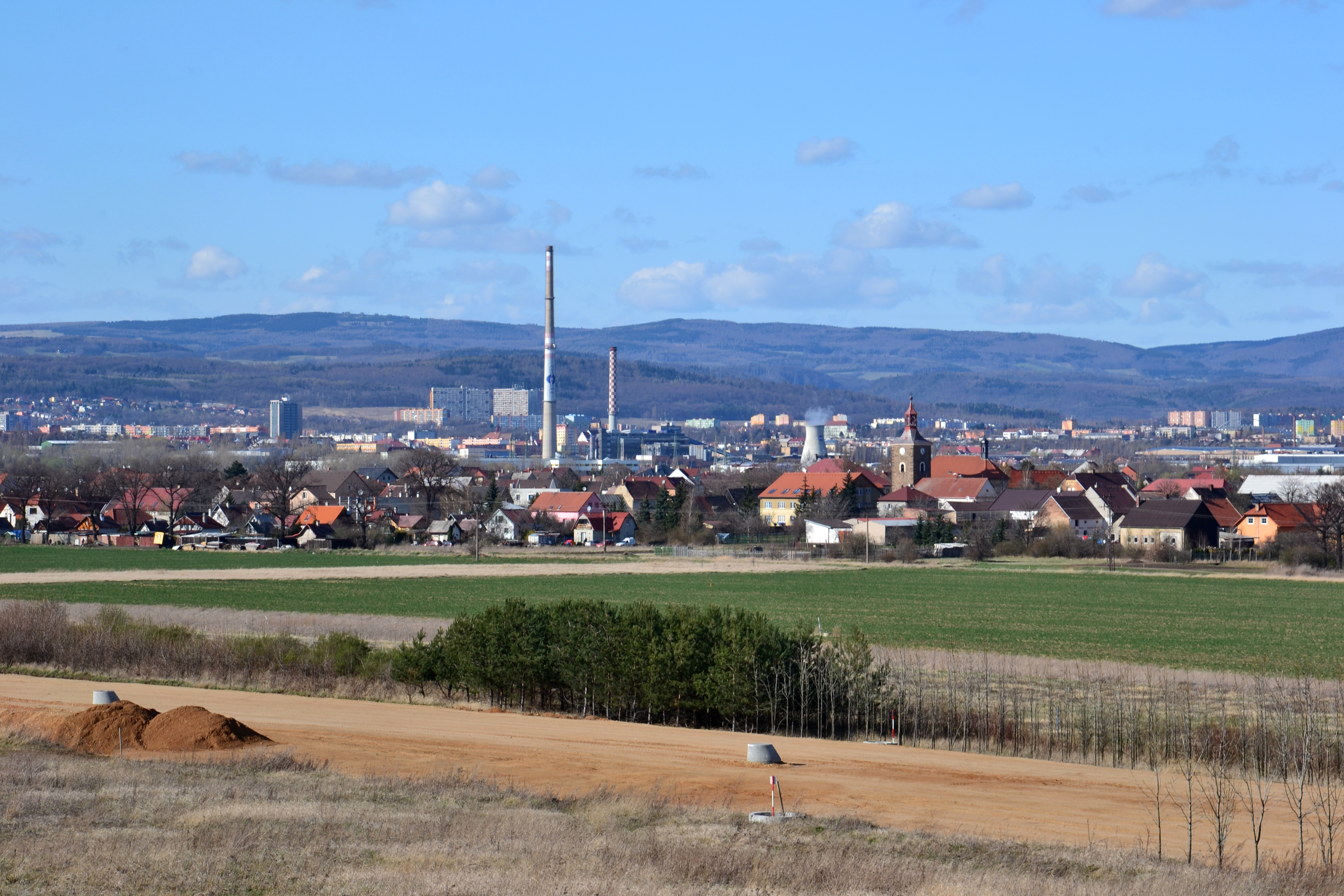
- General view

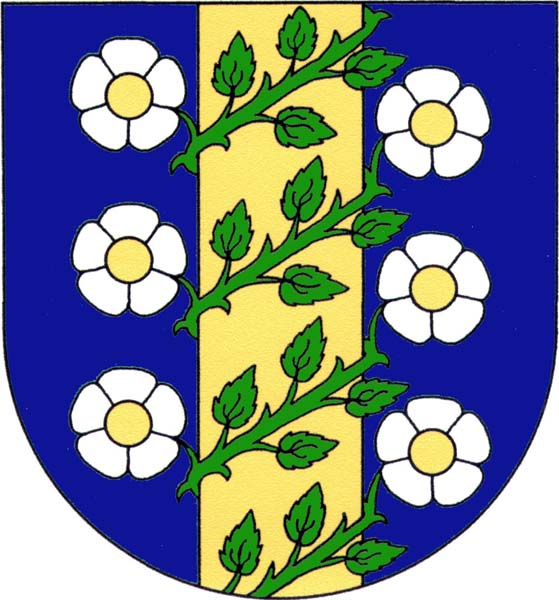
- Flag Coat of arms

- Location in the Czech Republic
- Coordinates: 50°25′51″N 13°25′45″E
- Country: Czech Republic
- Region: Ústí nad Labem
- District: Chomutov
- First mentioned: 1314

Area
  - Total: 10.68 km^{2} (4.12 sq mi)
- Elevation: 300 m (980 ft)

Population (2026-01-01)
  - Total: 836
  - Density: 78.3/km^{2} (203/sq mi)
- Time zone: UTC+1 (CET)
  - Summer (DST): UTC+2 (CEST)
- Postal code: 431 44
- Website: www.drouzkovice.cz

Droužkovice (German: Trauschkowitz) is a municipality and village in Chomutov District in the Ústí nad Labem Region of the Czech Republic. It has about 800 inhabitants.

== Demographics ==
Historical population
Year	Pop.	±%
1869	577	—
1880	559	−3.1%
1890	625	+11.8%
1900	768	+22.9%
1910	832	+8.3%
1921	981	+17.9%
1930	1,404	+43.1%
1950	858	−38.9%
1961	805	−6.2%
1970	683	−15.2%
1980	542	−20.6%
1991	427	−21.2%
2001	516	+20.8%
2011	734	+42.2%
2021	801	+9.1%
Source: Censuses

== Notable people ==
- Vlastimil Harapes (1946–2024), dancer, choreographer and actor
