= Morgiana (film) =

1972 Czechoslovak film

- Directed by: Juraj Herz
- Written by: Juraj Herz; Vladimír Bor
- Based on: book Jessie and Morgiana by Alexander Grin
- Starring: Iva Janžurová; Josef Abrhám; Nina Divíšková
- Cinematography: Jaroslav Kučera
- Edited by: Jaromír Janáček
- Music by: Luboš Fišer
- Production company: Filmové studio Barrandov
- Release date: 1 September 1972
- Running time: 106 minutes
- Country: Czechoslovakia
- Language: Czech

Morgiana is a 1972 Czechoslovak Gothic drama film directed by Juraj Herz, based on a novel by Alexander Grin, Jessie and Morgiana (1929, Wikisource: Джесси и Моргиана). The story is about two sisters, Klara and Viktoria, and the jealousy that overcomes Viktoria when her sister inherits most of their father's property. When Klara becomes involved with a man that her sister loves, Viktoria begins to plot her murder.

The roles of both sisters are played by the actress Iva Janžurová.

Beach scenes were shot in Bulgaria.

== Cast ==
- Iva Janžurová as Klára / Viktoria
- Josef Abrhám as Marek
- Nina Divíšková as Otylie
- Petr Čepek as Glenar
- Josef Somr as Drunkard
- Jiří Kodet as Bessant
