= Sňatky z rozumu =

1968 Czechoslovak television miniseries

- Genre: Historical drama
- Written by: Otto Zelenka
- Directed by: František Filip
- Country of origin: Czechoslovakia
- No. of episodes: 5

Production
- Running time: 90 minutes

Original release
- Network: Czechoslovak Television
- Release: 1968

Related
- Zlá krev

Sňatky z rozumu is a 1968 Czechoslovak television miniseries directed by František Filip.
