= Zlá krev =

Czechoslovak historical television series

- Genre: Historical drama
- Written by: Otto Zelenka
- Directed by: František Filip
- Country of origin: Czechoslovakia
- No. of episodes: 7

Production
- Running time: 66 minutes

Original release
- Network: Czechoslovak Television
- Release: 1986

Related
- Sňatky z rozumu

Zlá krev (Evil blood) is a Czechoslovak television historical mini-series which was first broadcast in 1986. The programme was directed by František Filip. The story is based on five books written by Vladimír Neff: "Sňatky z rozumu" (Marriages of convenience), "Císařské fialky" (Imperial violets), "Zlá krev" (Evil blood), "Veselá vdova" (Merry Widow) and "Královský vozataj" (Royal charioteer) – all creating the family saga and loosely telling the story of the ancestors of Neff family through the 19th century.
