= Luba Skořepová =

Czech actress

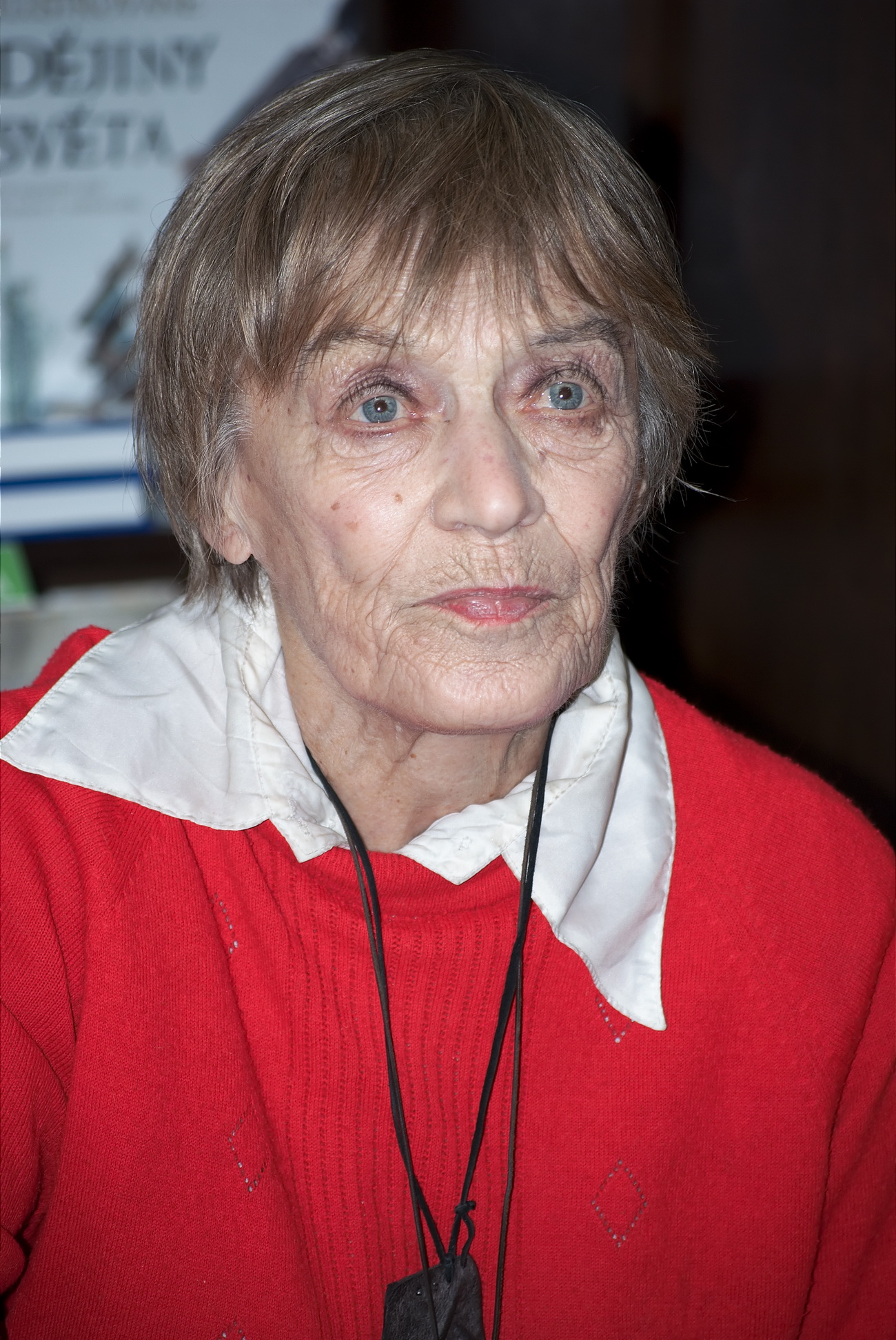
- Luba Skořepová in 2010
- Born: 21 September 1923; Náchod, Czechoslovakia
- Died: 23 December 2016 (aged 93); Prague, Czech Republic
- Occupation: Actress
- Years active: 1946–2015

Luba Skořepová (21 September 1923, Náchod – 23 December 2016, Prague ) was a Czech actress. She appeared in more than 100 films and television shows between 1946 and 2015.

From 1942 to 1944, Luba Skořepová studied drama at the Prague Conservatory. From 1945 to 1948, she worked with the Jindřich Honzl Youth Ensemble and at the National Theatre Studio. Following her death in 1948, she became a member of the National Theatre's drama company.

Her first husband was the actor Josef Pehr, and her second the writer Pavel Hanuš (1928–1991).However, Skořepová remained childless. Luba Skořepová spent much of her free time at her home in the village of Líšný in the Železný Brod region.

== Selected filmography ==
- Arabela (1979, TV series)
