= Car attendant =

Railroad employee

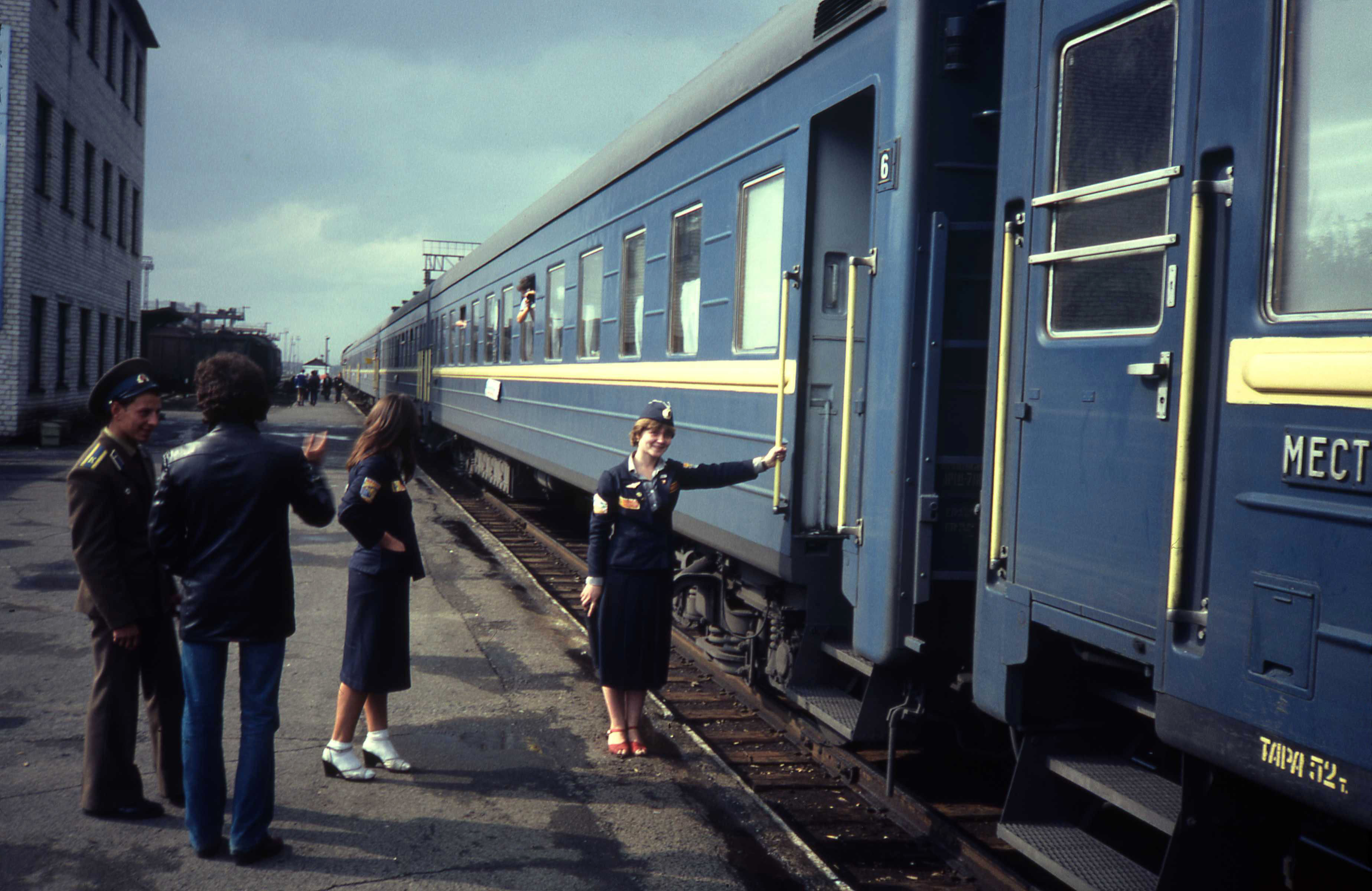
Trans-Siberian car attendant

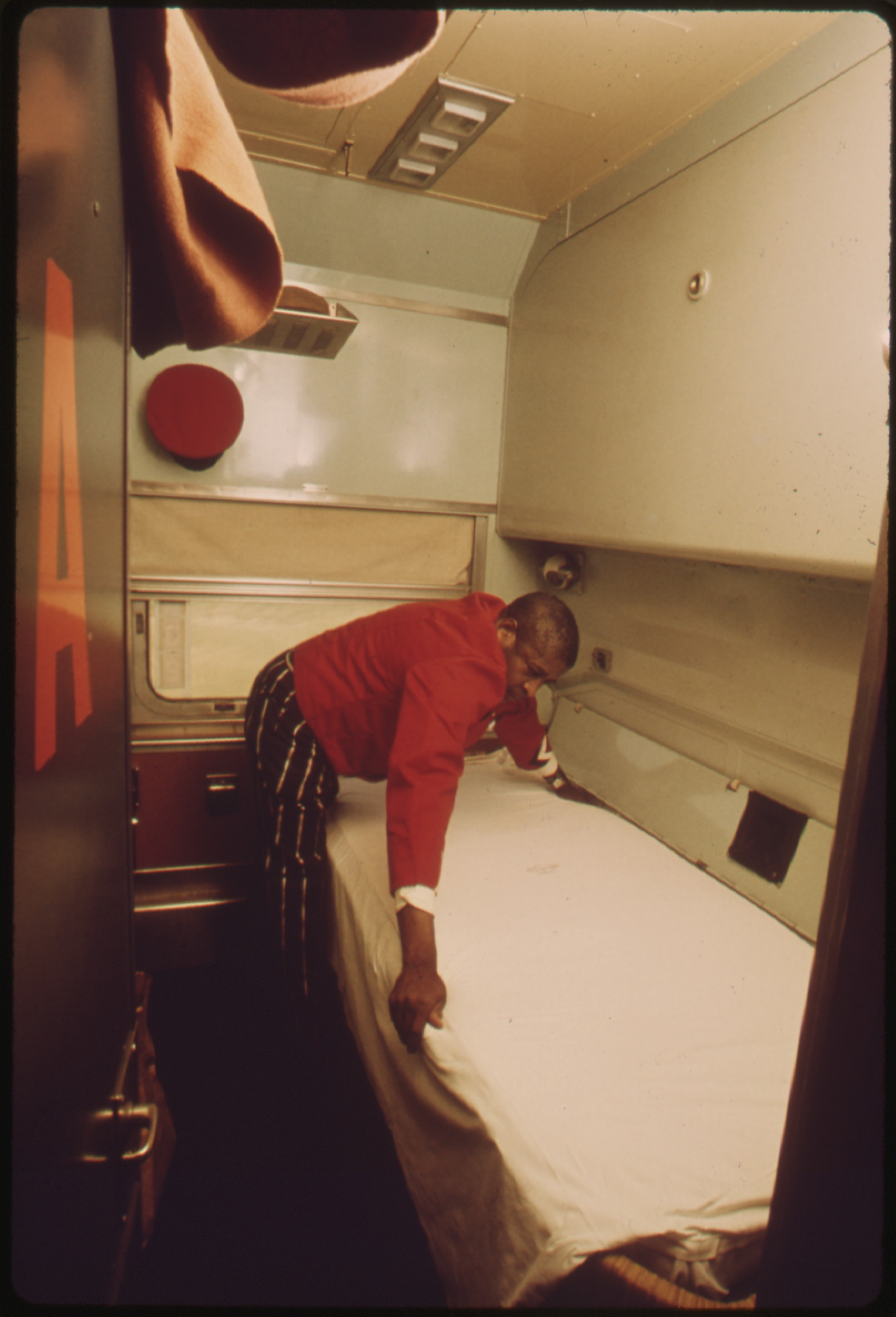
Amtrak sleeping car attendant

A car attendant is a railroad employee placed in charge of a single coach, sleeping car, or lounge car on a medium-to-long-distance passenger train.

Their duties vary according to the type of car, but most typically include managing passenger seat assignments (in order to avoid separating parties of two or more), assisting the conductor with tickets, making announcements, opening and closing doors, assisting passengers with boarding and detraining, monitoring the safe operation of onboard systems, and generally ensuring the safe operation of the car. In addition, sleeping car attendants (formerly called "Pullman porters") typically convert the individual accommodations from "day" mode to "night" mode, rather than leaving that to the passengers, and set out coffee and juice for their passengers each morning. (Sleeping car attendants, however, typically have fewer passengers to serve than coach attendants). Lounge car attendants typically operate food and beverage service, sell souvenirs and other non-food items, operate onboard motion picture service, and keep tables clean.

On scenic trains, it is not unusual for car attendants to double as tour guides.

Full-service dining cars normally have a steward, supervising several waiters and a kitchen staff, rather than a single attendant; with the car attendants, these people form the onboard service crew, often supervised by a Chief of Onboard Services or "Train Boss," separate from and subordinate to the conductor.
