= František Filip =

Czech director (1930–2021)

- Born: 26 December 1930; Písek, Czechoslovakia
- Died: 9 January 2021 (aged 90); Prague, Czech Republic
- Occupations: Television director; film director

František Filip (26 December 1930 – 9 January 2021) was a Czech film and television director.

== Biography ==
During his studies at the Film and TV School of the Academy of Performing Arts in Prague in the 1950s, he filmed his first documentary film. After graduation, he joined Czechoslovak Television in 1954, where he remained until his retirement. However; even after retirement he still continued to work in television. During the span of his career, he directed about 600 film and television programs of various genres for viewers of all ages. In 2017, he was awarded the Thalia Award.

== Death ==
Filip died from COVID-19 in Prague on 9 January 2021, at the age of 90, during the COVID-19 pandemic in the Czech Republic. He was buried in his family tomb at the Olšany Cemetery in Prague.

== Filmography ==
=== Television series ===
- 1960 Jak šel Ferda do světa (puppet series for children)
- 1962 Tři chlapi v chalupě
- 1966 Eliška a její rod
- 1968 Sňatky z rozumu
- 1971 F. L. Věk
- 1974 Byl jednou jeden dům
- 1975 Chalupáři
- 1982 Dobrá Voda
- 1984 Rozpaky kuchaře Svatopluka
- 1986 Zlá krev
- 1988 Cirkus Humberto
- 1990 Přísahám a slibuji
- 1992 Náhrdelník
- 2000 Pra pra pra

=== Musical works ===
- 1978 Polská krev
- 1981 Prodaná nevěsta
- 1983 Netopýr

=== Other television productions ===
- 1962 Kočár nejsvětější svátosti
- 1967 Lucerna
- 1971 Kat nepočká
- 1975 Lístek do památníku
- 1976 Podnájemníci
- 1977 Ikarův pád
- 1977 Paličova dcera
- 1980 Nezralé maliny
- 1980 Scapinova šibalství
- 1980 Utopím si ho sám
- 1983 Tažní práci
- 1995 Den, kdy unesli papeže

=== Film ===
- 1964 Příběh dušičkový
- 1966 Hrdina má strach
- 1967 Utrpení mladého Boháčka
- 1969 Odvážná slečna
- 1993 Jedna kočka za druhou
- 1999 Nebát se a nakrást
