= Hoštice (Strakonice District) =

- Municipality
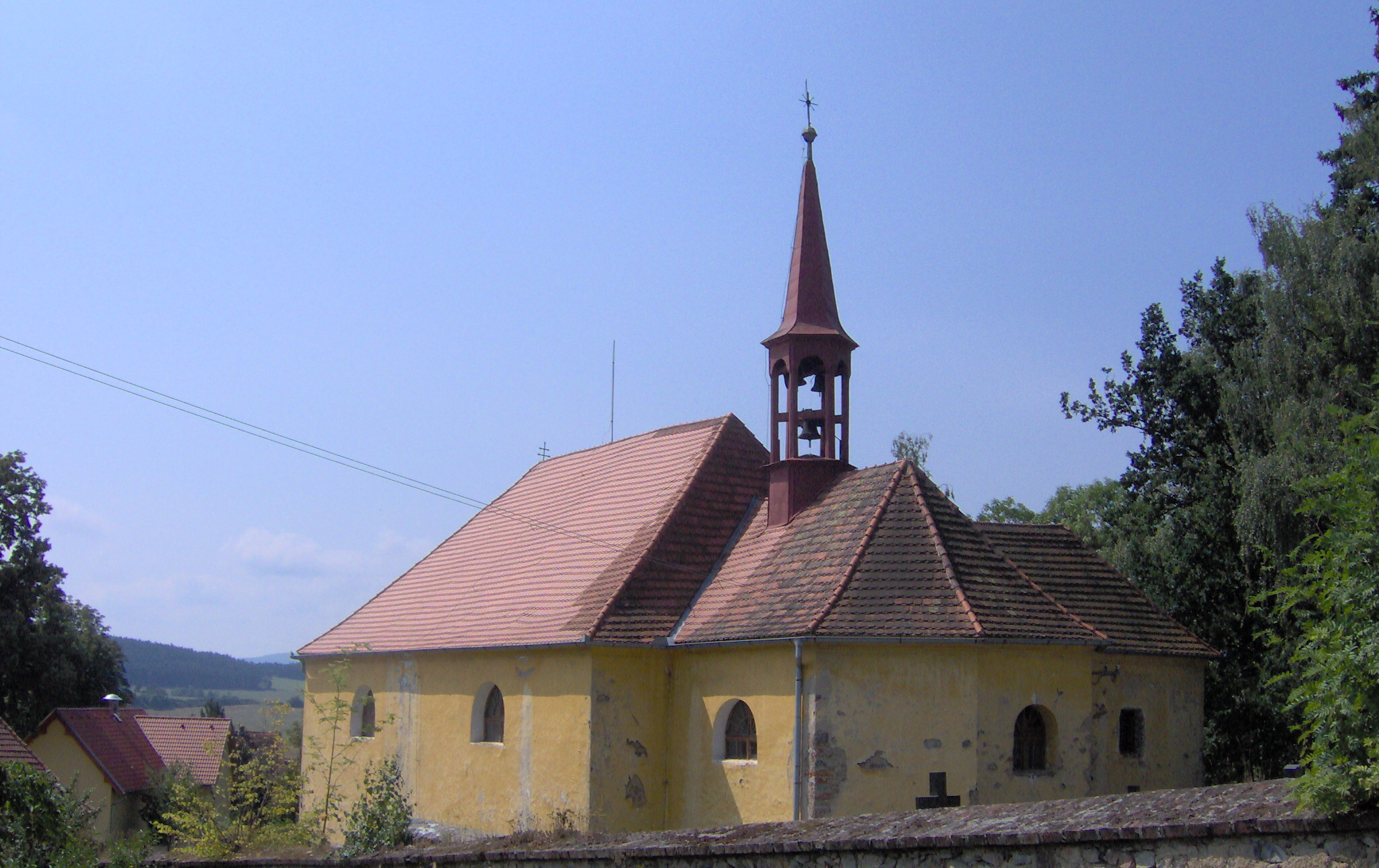
- Church of the Nativity of the Virgin Mary

- Location in the Czech Republic
- Coordinates: 49°11′39″N 13°54′34″E
- Country: Czech Republic
- Region: South Bohemian
- District: Strakonice
- First mentioned: 1274

Area
  - Total: 3.92 km^{2} (1.51 sq mi)
- Elevation: 508 m (1,667 ft)

Population (2026-01-01)
  - Total: 156
  - Density: 39.8/km^{2} (103/sq mi)
- Time zone: UTC+1 (CET)
  - Summer (DST): UTC+2 (CEST)
- Postal code: 387 01
- Website: www.hosticeuvolyne.cz

Hoštice is a municipality and village in Strakonice District in the South Bohemian Region of the Czech Republic. It has about 200 inhabitants.

== Etymology ==
The initial name of the village was Hostice. The name was derived from the personal name Host or Hosta, meaning "the village of Host's/Hosta's people".

== Geography ==
Hoštice is located about 7 kilometres (4 mi) south of Strakonice and 47 km (29 mi) northwest of České Budějovice. It lies in the Bohemian Forest Foothills. The highest point is the hill Kalný vrch at 634 m (2,080 ft) above sea level.

== History ==
The first written mention of Hoštice is from 1274, when it was owned by a local noble family who called themselves the Lords of Hoštice. From 1315, the village belonged to the Volyně estate. In the 16th century, Hoštice was a property of the Rosenberg family. The Rosenbergs sold it to the Vitanovský of Vlčkovice family in 1593, and they owned it until the end of the 17th century. The next owners of the village were the Chlumčanský of Přestavlky family. In 1799, Lord Jáchym Zádubský of Šontál acquired Hoštice. In 1822, the Schubert of Schutterstein family acquired Hoštice. The last noble owner of the village was Adolf Haid of Haidenburg.

== Demographics ==
Historical population

Year	Pop.	±%
1869	407	—
1880	412	+1.2%
1890	411	−0.2%
1900	402	−2.2%
1910	392	−2.5%

Year	Pop.	±%
1921	417	+6.4%
1930	328	−21.3%
1950	271	−17.4%
1961	247	−8.9%
1970	230	−6.9%

Year	Pop.	±%
1980	168	−27.0%
1991	143	−14.9%
2001	175	+22.4%
2011	146	−16.6%
2021	144	−1.4%

Source: Censuses

== Transport ==
There are no railways or major roads passing through the municipality. The train stop called Hoštice u Volyně on the railway line Strakonice–Volary, which serves Hoštice, is located in the territory of neighbouring Přechovice.

== Sights ==
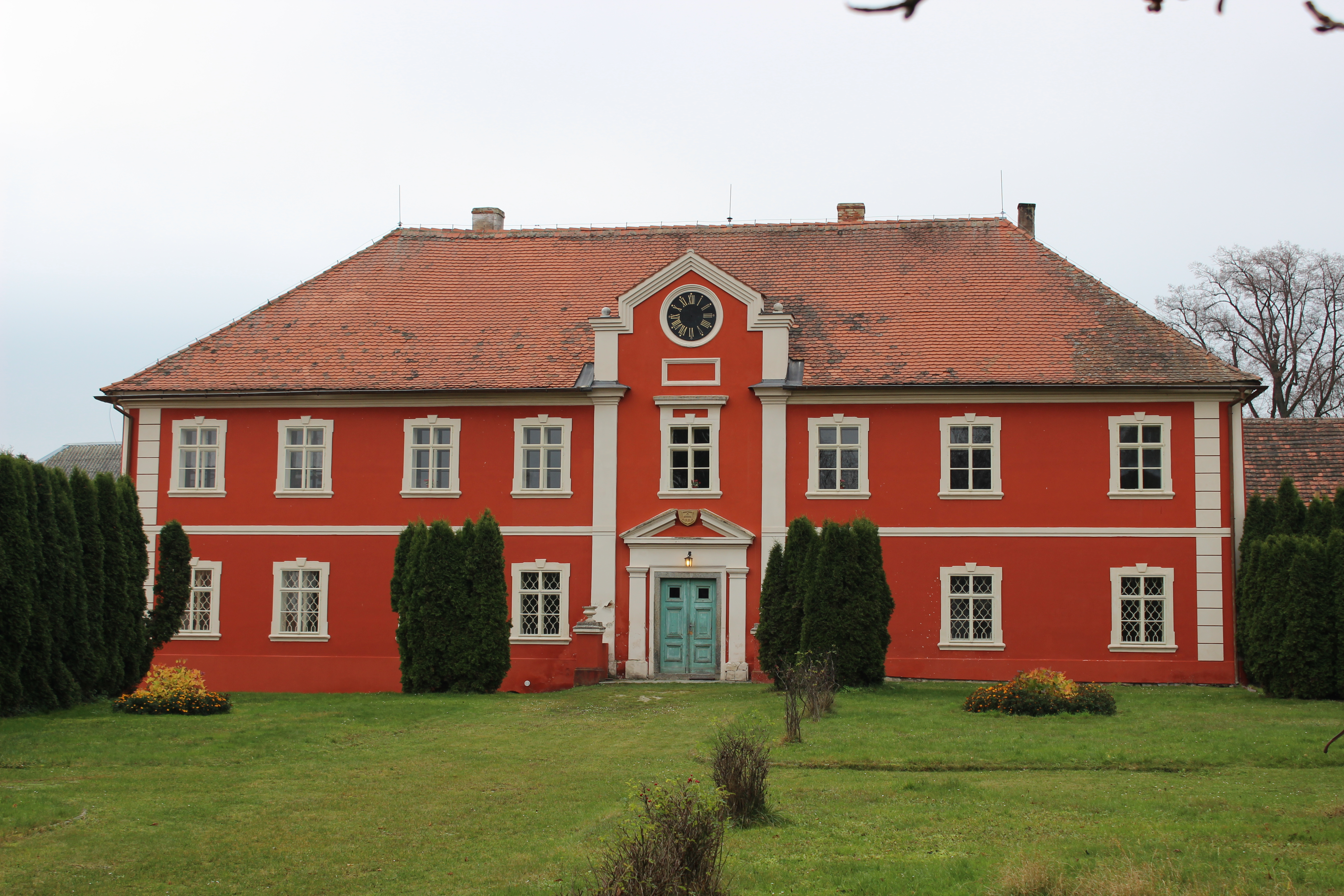
Hoštice Castle

The Hoštice Castle was built in the 17th century, probably on the site of a fortress from the 13th century. In 1777, a Baroque reconstruction began, which was not completed. The castle was rebuilt to its present form in 1870–1880. Today it is privately owned and inaccessible.

The Church of the Nativity of the Virgin Mary was built in 1593. This cemetery church was completely rebuilt in the 18th century, but the Renaissance core has been preserved. The church's furnishings in the pseudo-Renaissance and Baroque styles date from 1742.

A cultural monument is the Jewish cemetery. The establishment of the Jewish settlement in Hoštice dates back to 1692. The cemetery was founded between 1723 and 1735 and used until the end of the 19th century. The oldest preserved tombstone dates from 1735.

== In popular culture ==
Hoštice is known nationwide as the location where the film trilogy Slunce, seno was filmed and set. The trilogy includes the films Slunce, seno, jahody (1984), Slunce, seno a pár facek (1989) and Slunce, seno, erotika (1991), and was directed by local native Zdeněk Troška.

== Notable people ==
- Václav Leopold Chlumčanský (1749–1830), Archbishop of Prague
- Michal Tučný (1947–1995), singer; lived here and is buried here
- Zdeněk Troška (born 1953), film director
