= Dracula (Czech musical) =

1995 Czech musical

Dracula is a Czech musical created by Karel Svoboda, Zdeněk Borovec and Richard Hes. Its world premiere was in Prague on 13 October 1995 at the Prague Congress Centre (formerly the Palace of Culture), with Daniel Hůlka in the title role. It was immediately called the Czech musical of the century. The musical is very loosely based on Bram Stoker's 1897 novel Dracula.

The musical was performed very successfully between 1995 and 1998, and then again in 2003. The musical was performed in a new production at the Hybernia Theatre in Prague between 5 February 2009 and 28 May 2011. The director of both the original and the new production is Jozef Bednárik.

It is currently performed at the Hudební divadlo Karlín in Prague (premiere 5 March 2015, revival premiere 18 November 2026) and at the Divadlo J. K. Tyla in Pilsen (premiere 7 September 2024).

The musical is also featured on several recordings. The first CD was released in 1995 with Daniel Landa in the role of Dracula. A complete 2 CD musical recording was released in 1997. A selection CD with Daniel Hůlka as Dracula, Iveta Bartošová as Adriana/Sandra and Leona Machálková as Lorraine was released in 2003. New CD and 2DVD with full recording of the musical was released in 2009. The new recordings were also released in 2025 (30th Anniversary CD and Vinyl, Pilsen production recording) and 2026 (Tour recording).

Dracula was also successful in foreign theaters, such as in Germany, Korea and Belgium. A CD and DVD recording of the performances in Belgium was released in 2005. The musical was significantly edited for the Belgian theatres.

The story takes place in the fifteenth century, in the nineteenth century and in an unspecified near future.

== The story ==
=== 15th century ===
The story begins in the 15th century with farmers who seek protection in a monastery. They are running from Count Dracula's "Black Knights", and Dracula himself (Lord, Have Mercy). The priest tells the farmers not to worry, and that Dracula wouldn't dare touch a monastery. A young monk disagrees, doubting Dracula's values. The priest scolds him for not having faith in the power of Christ (Raise From Your Knees). Dracula, of course, doesn't mind the fact that it is a monastery. He robs it and orders his Knights to kill everyone (Dracula and His Evil Knights). The monk tries to stop him and protests Dracula's actions. But Dracula kills him without a second thought. The priest is furious and curses Dracula, saying "Even if he prays for death, he will never receive it, not even by his own hand. And his lips, reddened by bloodshed, will now thirst only for that same blood,".

In the meantime, the Countess Adriana, Dracula's pregnant wife and love, is sad about not seeing her Count. She asks the court jester to take her mind off of it and to cheer her up. He does so by pointing out a butterfly in the castle, and saying that it's a terrible "intruder" (Adriana and the Jester). Then, Dracula and Countess Adriana sing "Vim, ze jsi se mnou" (I Know You Are With Me), where they express their love for one another, saying that even with the great distance, nothing changes. They say that "the first flame, the first days of hope, the first touches of bonding," will be in them forever.

Dracula returns home, satisfied with his "mission". For a while he jokes around with the jester, saying that his task in life is to "clean the earth from all the unworthy filth" (The Bucker and the Sword). When he arrives to Adriana, she is dying from complications of child birth. Dracula learns that their newborn son is also dead. He is furious with the midwives, and shouts at them for not calling the doctor.

The jester, who despises his master, answers that he had run to get the doctor, but the doctor wasn't there, because he was at the monastery Dracula had attacked. This infuriates Dracula beyond all thought. He orders the knights to put the jester in the stocks, to have a "long, cruel" night. He then yells at the rest to disappear from his line of sight. Once he is left alone, he prays for Adriana to wake again (Heaven’s Gates). When that doesn't happen, he blames God for her death (An Unfair God). After some accusations shouted at God, he tries to commit suicide. No matter how many times he tries, his wounds instantly heal without scarring. This is when he learns that the curse from the priest is very much real; he is immortal (Dracula's Realization).

Instantly euphoric, he throws a huge celebration and calls back his jester, so that everyone is merry. Then he learns the second part of the curse, when he accidentally sucks all the blood from a young village girl, to the horror of everyone else (Lust and Passion).

=== 19th century ===
The story fast forwards to the 19th century (Intermezzo 1840). Dracula is now living in his castle with three "nymphs" (who eternally love him), his servants, and the main servant (played by the same man as the jester)(Nymphs). He is depressed with the immortality and still thinks of no one but his beloved Adriana (Life).

A young girl, Lorraine, his poor and orphaned distant relative, seeking refuge before her father's will is solved by lawyers, comes to his castle. She is first afraid of the castle, and all the woods surrounding it. But once she meets Dracula, she intends to stay. They agree on meeting in the garden during the next day (The Secret Castle).

The three nymphs, jealous, try to persuade Dracula to behave as he normally would, and drain her blood out (Jealousy). Dracula resists and hopes that with this new-found love, his curse will be lifted. The voice of the priest reminds him that that is not to be. Dracula does not come to the garden the next day, and instead sends his servant with a necklace and an invitation to a ball. At first, Lorraine is angry that the Count did not come, but accepts the gift (A Meeting in the Garden).

In the meantime, Lorraine's brother, the young abbot Steven, comes to the castle to look for his sister. He suspects Dracula of being behind the murders of girls and women in the land. Before the ball, everyone who is invited is wondering why a ball is being held when it is the wrong season for such events. They try to pry the information out of the servant, but he does not give them any reasons. Their bickering is interrupted by the arrival of Dracula himself with Lorraine on his arm, wearing his necklace (The Ball).

During the ball they both disappear, probably to Dracula's bedroom. Other ball guests hide behind their masks that they are also vampires and other various beasts. The ball alters to an orgy. Shocked, Steven watches and is dragged into their dance. The servant saves him from being killed and then wonders out loud if he should finish him off or help him. He also speaks of the relationships between masters and their servants (The Bridge of Time). He lets Steven live, but keeps him prisoner (Steven's Monologue).

Lorraine then sings the famous "Jsi můj pán" (My Lord), where she describes how Dracula is the only thing important in her life now. She has completely and hopelessly fallen for him.

A few days later, Dracula and Steven meet. Steven is angry that he was kept a prisoner and wants to take his sister away. Lorraine comes and assures him that she is happy with the Count. Steven tries to kill Dracula, but the wound instantly heals. Once they have learned of the immortality, Steven kills himself out of desperation. Now aware of what the Count really is, Lorraine begs him to also make her a vampire, saying that there is no point in her life without him. Unhappily, he complies (Resolutionn). The townsfolk chases Dracula, nymphs and Lorraine, but the servant is able to lead them away and vampires escape (The Hunt for Evil).

=== Near future ===
First we meet the Stockers, a motor gang whose leader is Nick and his girlfriend Sandra. Sandra looks very similar to Adriana (and is played by the same actress). Nick promises her that their last heist will be looking at a casino, which is owned by Dracula (Stockers).

Dracula, in these days, has a trusted Professor (another incarnation of Jester/Servant) interested in his case, who helps him monitor his health (Dehibernation). Lorraine is becoming an alcoholic, and slowly realizes that Dracula cares for her less and less (The Empty Casino). She persuades the Professor to take her to his lab, where she has been denied entrance by Dracula. They go to the lab, only moments after Nick, who takes a photo of Adriana's painting and runs away. When Lorraine sees Adriana's portrait she loses all interest in the machine and realizes that it's possible that Dracula loves someone else (Trio in the Grave). The nymphs and other workers of the casino delightedly watch the growing problems between Dracula and Lorraine (Malicious Nymphs).

Nick stole the same dress that Adriana had on in her portrait, for Sandra (Pygmalion). They visit the casino, and Sandra is wearing Adriana's dress. Dracula thinks that Adriana has returned and is instantly smitten, forgetting all about Lorraine. Lorraine makes a jealous scene, but Dracula tells her that Adriana is "my eternal love, and I'm sick of you!" (The Casino Show) After Dracula's hurtful words, Lorraine understands that her sacrifice was in vain (Lorraine in the Grave). Sandra, who has had enough of trying to be sexy for men that treat her with no respect, is charmed by Dracula's sweet and sincere words, and decides to meet with him (Sandra in Love). Dracula once again expresses his love for her (Dracula’s Monologue / Love in the Grave). Sandra tries to explain the truth to him, but Nick interrupts them and takes Sandra away. Dracula is furious and chases after them. When other Stockers on motorbikes come, the Professor puts himself in front of the Count to save Dracula's life and loses his own (The Pursuit / Destruction of the Casino).

Dracula, with nothing left to him but pain, is finally allowed to die. He has to have a final judgment, with all of those whom he has hurt. This goes from the priest, the village girl, Lorraine, Sandra, everyone. The characters accuse him of how much he hurt them, only Lorraine and Jester finding some defence for Dracula. Sandra has her chance to explain that she is not Adriana (The Dream Court).

Lorraine, knowing there is nothing left here for her, decides to join him in death. Dracula asks Sandra to let the sun into his room, killing both him and Lorraine (The Death of Dracula).

== Musical numbers ==
Act I

Epoch I – 15th Century

- Introduction (Předehra)
- Lord, Have Mercy (Smilování) - Company
- Raise From You Knees (Vstaň, bratře můj) - Priest, Company
- Dracula and His Evil Knights (Černí rytíři) - Dracula, Priest, Company
- Adriana and The Jester (Šašek a Adriana) - Adriana, Jester
- I Know You Are With Me (Vím, že jsi se mnou) - Dracula, Adriana
- The Bucker and the Sword (Džber a kord) - Dracula, Jester
- Heaven’s Gate (Tam do věčných bran) - Dracula, Adriana
- Death (Smrt) - Jester
- An Unfair God (Nespravedlivý Bůh) - Dracula
- Dracula’s Realization (Draculovo poznání nesmrtelnosti) - Dracula
- Lust and Passion (Milování) - Jester, Company, Dracula

Epoch II – 19th Century

- Time Passes (Mezihra - Plynutí času)
- Nymphs (Nymfy) - Nymphs
- Life (Žít) - Dracula, Nymphs, Adriana
- The Secret Castle (Tajemný hrad) - Lorraine, Dracula
- Jealousy (Žárlivost) - Nymphs, Dracula, Priest
- Meeting in The Garden (Schůzka v zahradě) - Lorraine, Servant
- The Ball (Upíří valčík) - Servant, Nymphs, Dracula, Lorraine, Company
- The Bridge of Time (Sluha a čas) - Servant
- Steven’s Monologue (Stevenův monolog) - Steven
- My Man (Jsi můj pán) - Lorraine
- Resolution (Dokonáno) - Dracula, Lorraine, Steven
- The Hunt for Evil (Hon na zlo) - Dracula, Lorraine, Servant, Company

Act II

Epoch III – Future

- Time Passes (Mezihra - Plynutí času)
- Stockers (Stockers) - Sandra, Nick, Company
- Dehibernation (Dehybernace) - Dracula, Professor
- The Empty Casino (Prázdné casino) - Lorraine, Professor
- Trio in the Grave (Odhalení) - Lorraine, Professor, Nick
- Malicious Nymphs (Škodolibé nymfy) - Nymphs, Lorraine, Company
- Pygmalion (Pygmalion) - Sandra, Nick
- The Casino Show (Casino show) - Dracula, Lorraine, Sandra, Nick, Company
- Lorraine in the Grave (Lorraine v podzemí) - Lorraine
- Sandra in Love (Okouzlená Sandra) - Sandra, Nick
- Dracula's Monoglogue (Draculův monolog) - Dracula
- Love in the Grave (Vyznání) - Dracula, Sandra
- The Pursuit (Pronásledování) - Dracula, Nick, Sandra
- Destruction of the Casino (Devastace casina) - Dracula, Nick, Professor, Company
- The Dream Court (Snový soud) - Dracula, Lorraine, Sandra, Jester, Steven, Priest, Company
- The Death of Dracula (Draculova smrt) - Dracula, Lorraine, Sandra, Jester, Steven, Priest, Nymphs, Company

== Cast ==
=== 1995–1997 ===
- Dracula: Daniel Hůlka, Daniel Landa (few performances), Tomáš Bartůněk, Petr Dopita, Jan Apolenář (probably an understudy)
- Lorraine: Lucie Bílá, Magda Malá
- Adriana/Sandra: Leona Machálková, Linda Finková, Katarína Hasprová
- Jester/Servant/Professor: Jiří Korn, Jan Apolenář
- Steven: Zbyněk Fric, Pavel Vítek, Pavel Polák
- Priest: Tomáš Trapl, Jan Apolenář, Bohuš Matuš
- Nick: Richard Genzer, Martin Pošta
- Hearth's Nymph: Hana Křížková, Andrea Fabiánová
- Clock's Nymph: Radůza, Linda Finková, Renata Drössler
- Wind's Nymph: Monika Absolonová, Magda Malá, Sylva Schneiderová
- Blood: Kateřina Stryková, Marcela Karleszová, Kristýna Kloubková, Marek Raab, Ladislav Beran, Tomáš Bohm

=== 1997–1998 ===
- Dracula: Daniel Hůlka, Petr Dopita, Tomáš Bartůněk, Andrej Bestchastny, František Ďuriač, Marcel Palonder
- Lorraine: Leona Machálková, Magda Malá, Monika Absolonová, Dagmar Rostandt, Lucia Šoralová
- Adriana/Sandra: Iveta Bartošová, Linda Finková, Katarína Hasprová, Helga Kovalovská
- Jester/Servant/Professor: Jiří Korn, Tomáš Trapl, Richard Genzer, Janko Gallovič
- Steven: Pavel Vítek, Pavel Polák, Bohuš Matuš, Jaroslav Březina
- Priest: Tomáš Trapl, Bohuš Matuš, Ivo Hrbáč
- Nick: Richard Genzer, Martin Pošta, Ivo Hrbáč
- Nymphs: Hana Křížková, Andrea Fabiánová, Radůza / Linda Finková, Renata Drössler, Daniela Šinkorová / Magda Malá, Monika Absolonová, Jana Zenáhlíková / Helga Kovalovská, Marta Polakovičová, Miroslava Marčeková, Karin Olasová
- Blood: Kateřina Stryková, Marek Raab, Ladislav Beran, Adéla Šeďová, Jurij Kolva

=== 2003 ===
- Dracula: Daniel Hůlka, Tomáš Bartůněk, Ernesto Čekan
- Lorraine: Leona Machálková, Jana Vaculíková, Vanda Konečná
- Adriana/Sandra: Iveta Bartošová, Kateřina Mátlová
- Jester/Servant/Professor: Jiří Korn, Pavel Towen Veselý
- Steven: Bohuš Matuš, Marián Vojtko, David Uličník
- Priest: Karel Černoch, Josef Zíma
- Nick: Roman Vojtek, Karol Cinno
- Nymphs: Hana Křížková, Andrea Fabiánová / Renata Drössler, Vanda Konečná / Zuza Ďurdinová, Jana Tyšerová

=== 2009–2011 ===
- Dracula: Daniel Hůlka, Josef Vojtek, Marián Vojtko
- Lorraine: Monika Absolonová, Leona Machálková, Radka Fišarová
- Adriana/Sandra: Kamila Nývltová, Šárka Vaňková, Zdenka Trvalcová
- Jester/Servant/Professor: Jiří Langmajer, Tomáš Trapl, Aleš Háma
- Steven: Bohuš Matuš, Tomáš Savka, Josef Vágner
- Priest: Jaromír Holub, Jiří Březík, Bedřich Levý
- Nick: Martin Pošta, Alan Bastien, Juraj Bernáth
- Nymphs: Hana Křížková, Michaela Nosková, Barbora Leierová / Olga Lounová, Renata Drössler / Sylva Schneiderová, Jana Burášová, Barbora Leierová (understudy)

Kamila Nývltová had two performances as Lorraine.

=== 2015–2026 ===
- Dracula: Daniel Hůlka, Marián Vojtko, Lukáš Kumpricht, Ivo Hrbáč (understudy)
- Lorraine: Eva Burešová, Leona Machálková, Kamila Nývltová (+ Magda Malá played in 2 public rehearsals)
- Adriana/Sandra: Eva Burešová, Kamila Nývltová, Veronika Vyoralová, Šárka Vaňková (understudy) (+ Daniela Šinkorová played in a few rehearsals)
- Jester/Servant/Professor: Tomáš Trapl, Ivo Hrbáč (understudy)
- Steven: Peter Strenáčik, Josef Vágner, Tomáš Löbl
- Priest: Ivo Hrbáč, Bedřich Lévi (+ Jaromír Holub played in few shows)
- Nick: Richard Genzer, Martin Pošta (+ Juraj Bernáth played in few shows)
- Hearth's Nymph: Hana Křížková, Jana Zenáhlíková, Barbora Leierová (understudy)
- Clock's Nymph: Renata Drössler, Jana Zenáhlíková, Barbora Leierová (understudy)
- Wind's Nymph: Sylva Schneiderová, Jana Zenáhlíková, Barbora Leierová (understudy), Jana Burášová (understudy)
- Blood: Tomáš Böhm, Jurij Kolva, Kateřina Matyášová, Johana Hájková, Marek Lhotský, Vojtěch Vlasák

=== 2024– ===
- Dracula: Jozef Hruškoci, Jaroslav Panuška (understudy)
- Lorraine: Natálie Dvořáková, Charlotte Režná
- Adriana/Sandra: Lucie Pragerová, Alexandra Vostrejžová (understudy), Natálie Dvořáková (understudy)
- Šašek/sluha/profesor: Martin Holec, Lumír Olšovský (understudy)
- Steven: Pavel Klimenda, Petr Špinar
- Pries: Lukáš Ondruš
- Monk: Adam Rezner
- Nick: Dušan Kraus, Filip Antonio (understudy)
- Nymphs: Soňa Hanzlíčková / Andrea Holá, Eva Staškovicová, Kateřina Herčíková
- Blood: Helena Nováčková, Karel Jindra, Michal Kováč, Jakub Sedláček, Barbora Böhm, Kristýna Stránská, Zuzana Havrlantová (swing)

=== 2026– ===
- Dracula: Marián Vojtko, Ivo Hrbáč (understudy)
- Lorraine: Eva Burešová, Natália Olcsváry Hatalová (understudy)
- Adriana / Sandra: Ines Ben Ahmed, Barbora Konopásek Fialová (understudy), Nikola Ďuricová (understudy)
- Šašek / sluha / profesor: Ivo Hrbáč, Jan Sklenář
- Nick: Richard Genzer, Filip Hořejš
- Kněz: Jan Franc, Ivo Hrbáč
- Steven: Jan Brožek, Josef Vágner
- Heart's Nymph: Zuzana Brožek Holbeinová, Adéla Zejfartová
- Clock's Nymph: Natália Olcsváry Hatalová
- Wind's Nymph: Barbora Konopásek Fialová, Nikola Ďuricová
- Blood: Johana Hájková, Daniel Makovec, Marek Lhotský

== Stage Management (inspice / Stage Managers) ==
The Stage Management (inspice) of the original productions of the musical Dracula included, among others:

- Miroslav Dostal
- Miroslav Pinka
- Václav Bláha
- David Ružička
- Milan Školník

The stage managers directed the entire performance throughout its run. After the completion of the rehearsal process and the so-called handover (when the director transferred the finished production into operational control), the stage managers assumed full responsibility for running the performance from the premiere onward. This included coordinating all performers’ entrances, technical changes, and the overall organizational management of the production.
