= Helena Růžičková =

Czech actress (1936–2004)

- Born: Helena Málková; 13 June 1936; Prague, Czechoslovakia
- Died: 4 January 2004 (aged 67); Plzeň, Czech Republic
- Occupation: Actress
- Years active: 1940–2004
- Spouse: Jiří Růžička (m. 1955; died 2003)
- Children: 1

Signature
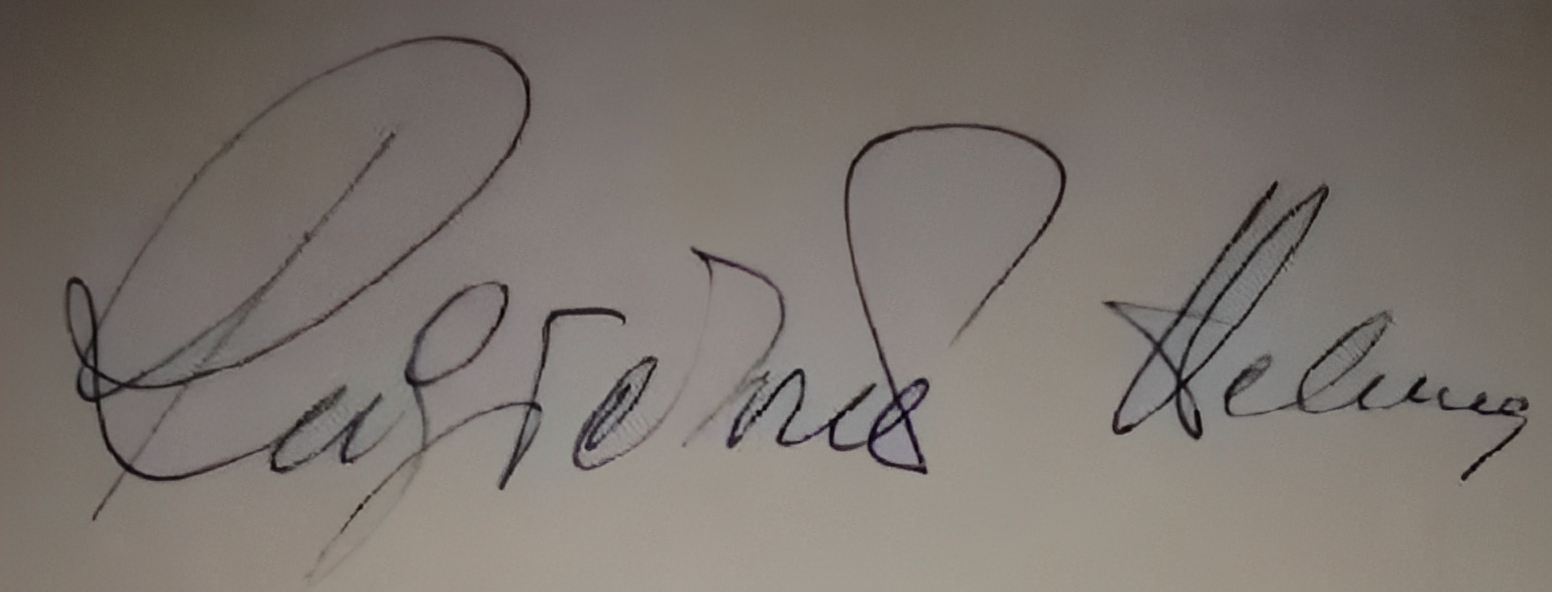

Helena Růžičková (13 June 1936 – 4 January 2004) was a Czech actress. She was known for her comedic talents and corpulent figure. She became popular especially thanks to her roles in Jaroslav Papoušek's Homolka comedy trilogy (1969–1972), and in Zdeněk Troška's comedy trilogy Slunce, seno (1984–1991).

== Biography ==
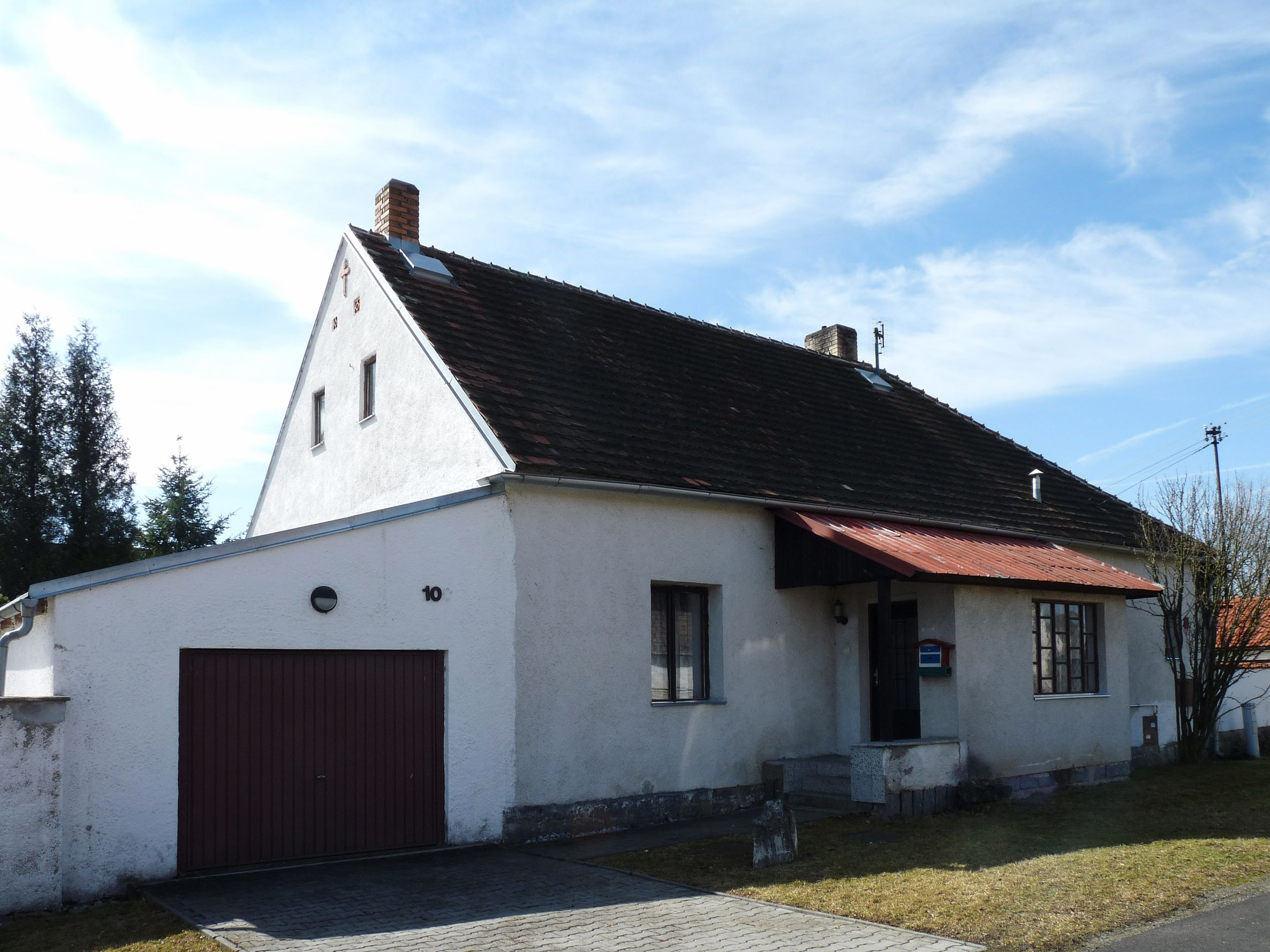
Růžičková's house in Slatina

Helena Málková was born on 13 June 1936 in Prague. Her mother was from Sarajevo (Bosnia and Herzegovina). She was involved in ballet from an early age and appeared on the stage of the National Theatre at the age of four. At the same age, she got her first film role, in Grandmother. At the age of 15, she applied to the Academy of Performing Arts in Prague, but was not accepted. She graduated as a dental laboratory technician, but she eventually became an actress. In 1955, she married actor Jiří Růžička and they were married until his death in 2003. Their son Jiří (1956–1999) was also an actor. At the age of thirty, Růžičková broke her spine and almost died.

After giving birth, Růžičková's body began to retain water and she acquired the characteristic corpulent figure. She made it an asset in the world of film. As an actress, she specialized in acting in films and was only briefly employed at the Theatre on the Balustrade from 1971 to 1973. She played over 100 film roles in her lifetime. She had a comedic talent, which is why she often appeared in comedies. The most memorable are her leading roles in the films Behold Homolka (1969) and Slunce, seno, jahody (1984), which became trilogies. She then starred in the film Trhala fialky dynamitem (1992), in which she also participated as a screenwriter. Her popularity ensured that the film had a high attendance in cinemas, even though the critics later condemned the film.

She was a believer, belonging to the United Methodist Church. Her hobbies included fortune telling and numerology. In 1996, she candidated to the Senate of the Czech Republic for the Communist Party of Bohemia and Moravia, but was unsuccessful.

Růžičková and her husband owned a house in Slatina, where they went on weekends. They lived there permanently in the last years of their lives. She had been battling stomach cancer for a long time. She died of kidney failure on 4 January 2004 in a hospital in Plzeň.

== Selected filmography ==
- Judgement Day (1949)
- Happy End (1966)
- End of a Priest (1969)
- Behold Homolka (1969)
- Hogo fogo Homolka (1970)
- Homolka a tobolka (1972)
- The Girl on the Broomstick (1972)
- Three Wishes for Cinderella (1973)
- Slunce, seno, jahody (1984)
- Princess Jasnenka and the Flying Shoemaker (1987)
- Vlak dětství a naděje (TV series; 1989)
- Slunce, seno a pár facek (1989)
- Slunce, seno, erotika (1991)
- Trhala fialky dynamitem (1992)
- Přítelkyně z domu smutku (TV series; 1992)
