= Temný kraj =

2017 Czech TV series

- Genre: Crime
- Written by: Jitka Bártů, Kateřina Bártů
- Directed by: Jitka Bártů
- Starring: Lukáš Vaculík; Kristýna Fuitová Nováková
- Country of origin: Czech Republic
- Original language: Czech
- No. of seasons: 2
- No. of episodes: 26

Production
- Production location: Konojedy
- Running time: 60 minutes

Original release
- Network: Prima televize
- Release: 2017 – 2019

Temný kraj (The Dark Country) is a Czech television series that aired on TV Prima in 2017–2019.

The main character of the series is a Prague policeman Petr Kraj who specializes in serial murders. He leaves for the countryside to recover after a sudden collapse. Here he meets colleagues from the district department who investigate a complex case of serial murder. The ambiguous name of the series refers not only to the place of its action, but also to the name of the main character. Each serial murder case is divided into two episodes.

The first season of the series was broadcast from January to April 2017. It was among the most successful series of Prima in recent years. The average viewership of the twelve episodes was 1.5 million viewers over the age of 15 with a share of 32%. The most watched episode of the first season even crossed the 1.7 million viewers mark (15+).

The village of Břeh, in which the series is set, is actually Konojedy near Prague. The majority of the series was filmed in Konojedy and its surroundings.

== Cast ==
- Lukáš Vaculík as Petr Kraj
- Kristýna Fuitová Nováková as Naďa Hamplová
- Jan Teplý as Vojta Coufal
- Karel Zima as Pepa Sláma
- Martin Trnavský as Luboš Bach
- Saša Rašilov as PhDr. Kryštof Steiner
- Jan Novotný as Lojza Hampl
- Tereza Kostková as MVDr. Tereza Coufalová
- Zdena Studénková as Libuše Kvapilová
