= Daniel Hůlka =

Czech singer and actor (born 1968)

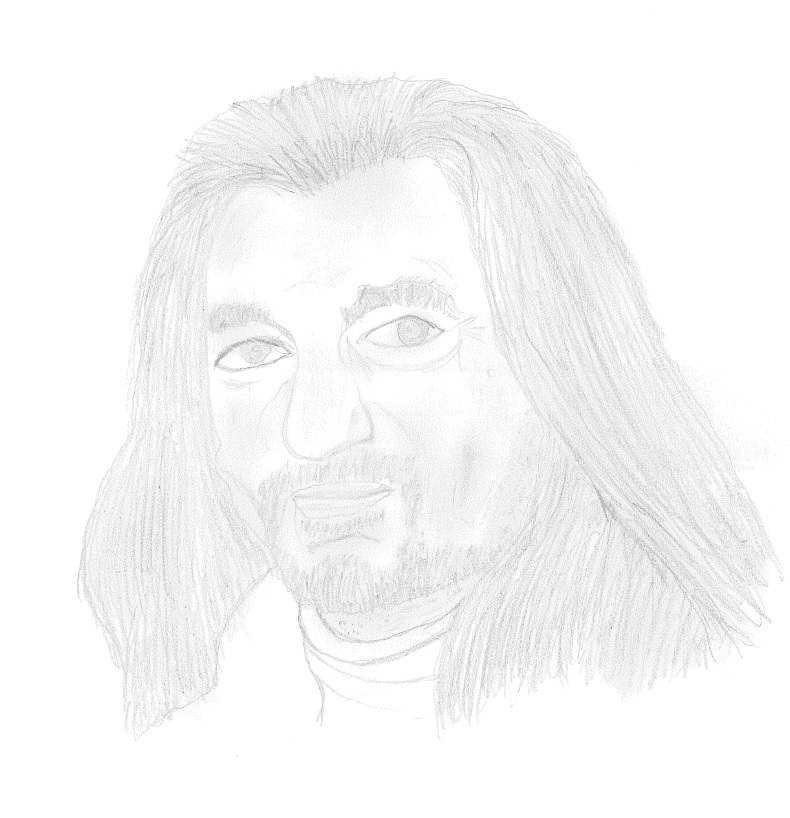
- Pencil sketch of Daniel Hůlka, 2019

Background information
- Born: 1 June 1968 (age 57); Prague, Czechoslovakia
- Genres: Musical theatre; opera; pop
- Occupations: Singer; actor
- Instrument: Vocals
- Years active: 1995—present
- Label: EMI
- Website: danielhulka.com

Daniel Hůlka (born 1 June 1968) is a Czech actor and baritone who is known for his performances in musical theatre, film, and opera. He has won both the Český slavík and the Anděl Awards multiple times and has released several recordings on EMI.

== Life and career ==
=== Music and film ===
Born in Prague, Hůlka took the flute, clarinet, and piano in grade school and played volleyball in high school, while also singing and playing guitar in a band with friends. He went on to study at the Prague Conservatory and then briefly at the Academy of Performing Arts in the class of Magdalena Hajossyova, before embarking on an opera career in the early 1990s. He first drew acclaim portraying the title role in Karel Svoboda's 1995 musical Dracula. He has since appeared in numerous musical productions in Prague, in such roles as Javert in Claude-Michel Schönberg's Les Misérables and the title role in Frank Wildhorn's Jekyll & Hyde.

As an opera singer, Hůlka has performed leading roles at the Estates Theatre; the Karlín Music Theatre, where he also sang under the direction of internationally acclaimed conductor Alexander Frey; the J. K. Tyl Theatre; the Liberec Theatre; the Městské divadlo Ústí nad Labem; and the Prague National Theatre, among others. Some of the roles he has portrayed on stage include Escamilio in Georges Bizet's Carmen, Kalina in Bedřich Smetana's The Secret, Silvio in Ruggero Leoncavallo's Pagliacci, and the title roles in Wolfgang Amadeus Mozart's Don Giovanni and Mozart's The Marriage of Figaro.

In 1997, Hůlka released his debut solo album, Daniel Hůlka. In 1999, he made his first film appearance in the movie Z pekla štěstí by Zdeněk Troška. In December of the same year, he travelled as a member of a delegation to hand over a Christmas tree to the Pope in the Vatican, and on this occasion, he sang in St. Peter's Square. In 2001, he appeared in Z pekla štěstí 2, the sequel to the 1999 film.

=== Political activity ===
In the 2013 Czech parliamentary election, Hůlka ran as the leader of the Party of Civic Rights in the Hradec Králové Region, but didn't win a seat.

He was previously an admirer of Miloš Zeman, supporting him in both presidential elections. However, in an open letter dated 12 October 2020, Hůlka reconsidered his position and ended his friendship with Zeman. He also announced that on Czech National Day, 28 October 2020, he would return the Medal of Merit that he had received from the president in 2016.

== Selected discography ==
- Daniel Hůlka (1997)
- Mise (1998)
- Živé Obrazy (1999)
- Rozhovor (2000)
- Gold (2001)
- Bravo, Pane Hrabě (2001)
- Ještě Jednu Árii, Pane Hrabě! (2002)
- Dílem Já (2004)

== Filmography ==
Year	Title	Role	Notes
1999	Z pekla štěstí	Brambas	Film
2001	Z pekla štěstí 2	King Brambas	Film
2020	Modrý kód		TV series – 1 episode

== Awards and recognition ==
Český slavík

- First place (1998)
- Second place (1997, 1999, 2000, 2001)
- Third place (2002)

Anděl Award

- First place, Best Singer (1997)
- Third place, Best Singer (1998, 1999)

Others

- TÝTÝ Poll – Second place (1997, 1998, 1999, 2000)
- Zlatý Otto – Gold (1997); Silver (1998); Bronze (1999)
- National Medal of Merit (2016) – returned to the Office of the President in November 2020
