= 2012 Czech Republic methanol poisonings =

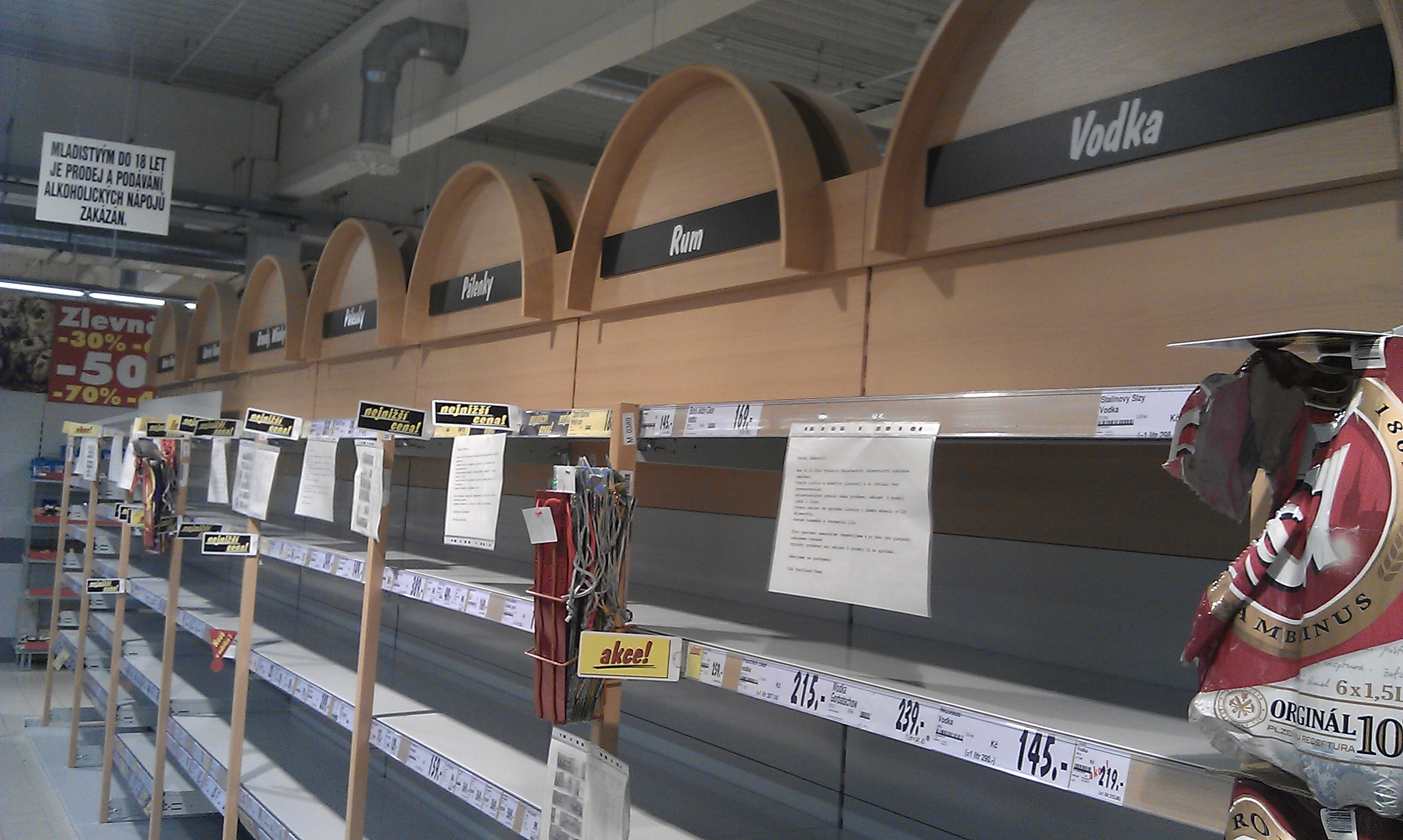
Empty shelves in a supermarket on 15 September

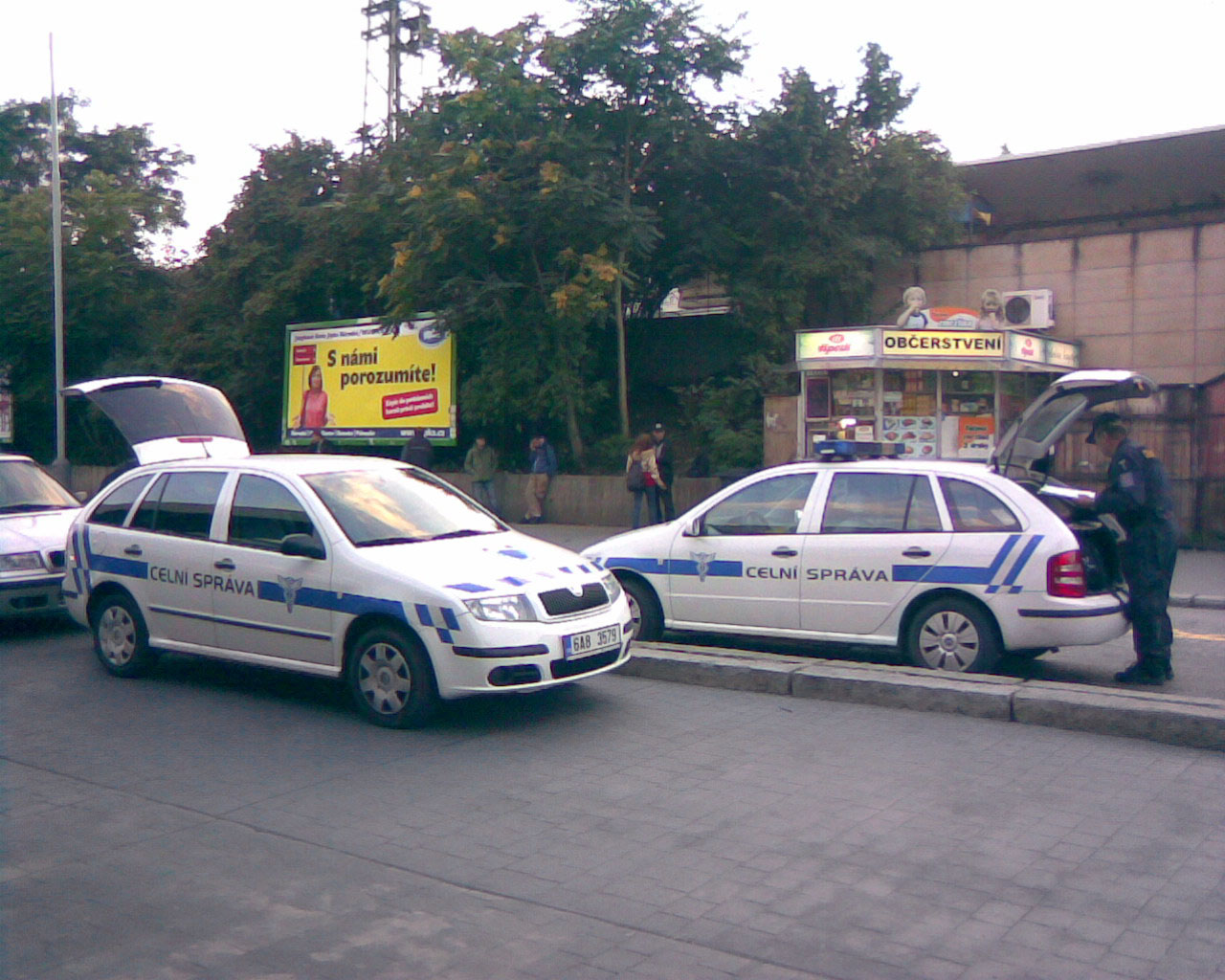
Customs Administration of the Czech Republic monitors observance of the ban in Prague, 13 September.

The 2012 Czech Republic methanol poisonings occurred in September 2012 in the Czech Republic, Poland and Slovakia. Over the course of several days, 38 people in the Czech Republic and four people in Poland died as a result of methanol poisoning and many others were hospitalised. The poisonings continued for several years after the main wave. As of April 2014, 51 had died and many others suffered permanent health damage.

The Czech government established a central emergency response council and banned the sale of liquors with more than 30% alcohol by volume at food stands on 12 September 2012. On 14 September, the ban was extended to any sale of any alcoholic beverages with an alcohol content above 20% vol. On 20 September, export of such products was banned as well. The restrictions on liquor sales were lifted seven days later.

The police systematically checked shops where liquors were sold. Led by police vice president Václav Kučera, a special police team called Metyl coordinated the investigations. On 24 September, the police announced that the source of the methanol-contaminated alcohol had been identified. Two main suspects were arrested: Rudolf Fian, a businessman from Karviná of Slovak nationality, and Tomáš Křepela, a Czech company owner from Řitka. On 21 May 2014, the two were sentenced to life imprisonment; eight others were also imprisoned for between 8 and 21 years.

Since May 2018, methanol has been banned in the European Union for use in windscreen washing or defrosting due to the risk of human consumption.

== Similar incidents ==
A similar incident, the Pärnu methanol poisoning incident, occurred in Pärnu county, Estonia, in September 2001, when 68 people died and 43 were left disabled after contents of stolen methanol canisters were used in production of bootleg liquor.

== In popular culture ==
The 2018 film Metanol, produced by the Czech Television, focuses on the distributors of the toxic alcohol and aftermath of the poisonings, including the investigation and eventual trial of perpetrators.
