= Marie Pilátová =

Marie Pilátová (14 May 1921 – 20 January 2015) was a Czech actress known for her role in the comedy trilogy Slunce, seno, jahody, Slunce, seno a pár facek and Slunce, seno, erotika; directed by Zdeněk Troška. The role of Konopníková in the trilogy was her only film appearance.
