= Noční operatér =

- Genre: Crime Drama
- Written by: Jitka Bártů; Kateřina Bártů
- Directed by: Jitka Bártů
- Starring: Lukáš Vaculík
- Country of origin: Czech Republic
- Original language: Czech
- No. of seasons: 1
- No. of episodes: 4

Production
- Cinematography: Václav Tlapák
- Running time: 59–62 minutes

Original release
- Network: Prima+
- Release: 4 November – 5 December 2025

Noční operatér (Night operator) is a Czech four-part crime drama series starring Lukáš Vaculík. It tells the story of cardiac surgeon Hart; his life falls apart after the police consider him a serial killer, nicknamed the Night Surgeon. With time running out and media pressure, he has only one chance to prove his innocence – a return to the operating room.

The series was inspired by real events.

The first episode was released on the Prima+ platform on 14 November 2025.

== Plot ==
Cardiac surgeon Vojtěch Hart unexpectedly suffers amnesia and becomes the police's prime suspect in a series of serial murders. He falls from the limelight to the very bottom of society when he ends up in pretrial detention. At the same time, he has to face the intrigues of a calculating hospital director and the pressure of a sensationalist media. His career, reputation and family are collapsing, but he is given a unique chance to return to the operating room, where he must not only save life of a key witness, but also revive his memories. He must take risks and find the right path that will lead the police not only to uncover corruption in the hospital management, but also to the real perpetrator of the serial murders.

== Cast ==
=== Main ===
- Lukáš Vaculík as MUDr. Vojtěch Hart
- Elizaveta Maximová as JUDr. Iva Zlámalová
- Ondřej Rychlý as police investigator Ondřej Hlaváček
- Jiří Havelka as MUDr. Ivan Netušil
- Lenka Vlasáková as police investigator Mirka

=== Supporting ===
- Jiří Roskot as Jan Blecha
- Petr Uhlík as Tadeáš, Iva's fiancé
- Lenka Krobotová as professor Hartová, Vojtěch's wife
- Jan Révai as JUDr. Robert Šulc
- Dana Morávková as Dáša, journalist and Robert's sister
- Viktor Limr as hospital director
- Ondřej Malý as prison inmate
- Robert Nebřenský as police chief Kotys
- Denis Šafařík as journalist
- Olga Želenská as prison medician
- Pavla Rychlá as MUDr. Květa Válková
- Michal Kern as Iva's colleague
- Kristýna Kociánová as Iva's colleague
- Petra Bučková as surgeon
- Kamila Trnková as nurse na kardiologii
- Vlasta Peterková as Mirka's mother
- Alžbeta Stanková as Ing. Šárka Charvátová
- Iveta Maurerová as Ing. Charvátová's secretary
- Jiří Hába as Vláďa Hart, Vojtěch's son
- Anna Bubníková as Ivana Svobodová
- Aneta Christovová as Jolana Blahová
- Dáša Kouřilová as Petra Valentová
