= Stuffed Lion Award =

Czech film award

Stuffed Lion Award for Worst Film
- Country: Czech Republic
- First award: 1993–2008
- Website: https://www.filmovaakademie.cz

Stuffed Lion Award for Worst Film was one of the awards given to the worst Czech motion picture. Awards were discontinued in 2008.

== Winners ==
Year	English Name	Original Name	Director
1993	The Canary Connection	Kanárská spojka	Ivo Trajkov
1994	Even Bigger Idiot Than We Had Hoped	Ještě větší blbec, než jsme doufali	Vít Olmer
1995	Wild Beer	Divoké pivo	Milan Muchna
1996	Seize the Day	UŽ	Zdeněk Tyc
1998	Rapid Eye Movement	Rychlé pohyby očí	Radim Špaček
1999	Fear not and Start Robbing	Nebát se a nakrást	František Filip
2000	Beginning of World	Začátek světa	Dan Svátek, Vladimír Drha, Pavel Melounek
2001	How to steal Dagmara	Jak ukrást Dagmaru	Jaroslav Soukup
2002	Waterloo Czech Style	Waterloo po česku	Vít Olmer
2003	Kameňák	Kameňák	Zdeněk Troška
2004	Kameňák 2	Kameňák 2	Zdeněk Troška
2005	Kameňák 3	Kameňák 3	Zdeněk Troška
2006	Born Into Shit	Po hlavě... do prdele	Marcel Bystroň
2007	The Catfish Summer	Poslední plavky	Michal Krajňák
