= Slunce, seno, jahody =

Sun, hay, strawberry
- DVD cover art
- Directed by: Zdeněk Troška
- Written by: Petr Markov, Zdeněk Troška
- Produced by: Blažej Vráb
- Starring: Miroslav Zounar; Vlastimila Vlková; Helena Růžičková; Jaroslava Kretschmerová
- Cinematography: Josef Hanuš
- Edited by: Eva Bobková
- Music by: Karel Vágner
- Distributed by: Ústřední půjčovna filmů
- Release date: 1 September 1984
- Running time: 83 minutes
- Country: Czechoslovakia
- Language: Czech

Slunce, seno, jahody (Sun, hay, strawberries) is a Czech comedy film made in 1983, usually regarded as one of the classics of the Czech comedy industry. Written and directed by Zdeněk Troška, it was filmed and set in Hoštice, a small rural village in the Czech portion of the former Czechoslovakia. It is a play on the perceived stereotypes of daily life in a village community.

== Plot ==
A Czech agricultural student, Šimon Plánička, arrives at the small South Bohemian town of Hoštice, and joins the local JZD (agricultural co-op) with the intention of trying out his experiment regarding the "Milk yield of cows in regards to a cultured environment". He runs into difficulty with the directorship of the JZD, but he finds them eager to help once they hear he's the son of the local agricultural commissioner, as his last name is also Plánička. Blažena Škopková is given the task of finding out how things are looking. However everything is complicated by the jealousy of Blažena's boyfriend Venca.

== Cast ==
- Pavel Kikinčuk as student Šimon Plánička
- Helena Růžičková as Mařena Škopková, Blažena's mother
- Stanislav Tříska as Vladimír Škopek, Blažena's father
- Arnoštka Červená as grandmother Škopková
- Veronika Kánská as Blažena Škopková
- Bronislav Černý as plumber Venca Konopník
- Marie Pilátová as Vlasta Konopníková, Venca's mother
- Václav Troška as Konopník, Venca's father
- Petra Pyšová as waitress Miluna
- Luděk Kopřiva as parish priest Otík
- Vlastimila Vlková as priest's housekeeper Cecilka
- Jiří Lábus as inseminator Béďa
- Jiřina Jirásková as Václavka Hubičková
- Pavel Vondruška as secretary Mošna
- Miroslav Zounar as Chairman of the JZD Pepa Rádl
- Jaroslava Kretschmerová as secretary of the JZD, nickname Evík
- Marie Švecová as Mařenka Kelišová, nickname Keliška
- Jiří Růžička as fat Josef
