= Karel Černoch =

Czech singer, guitarist and comedian (1943–2007)

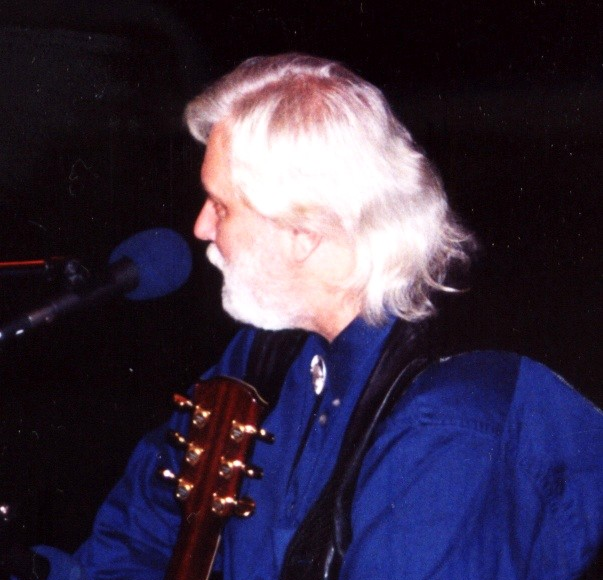
- Černoch in 1995
- Born: 12 October 1943; Prague, Protectorate of Bohemia and Moravia
- Died: 27 December 2007 (aged 64); Prague, Czech Republic
- Resting place: Olšany Cemetery, Prague
- Occupations: Singer, guitarist, comedian
- Years active: 1962–2007

Karel Černoch (12 October 1943 – 27 December 2007) was a Czech singer, guitarist, comedian and composer. He also worked as a musical theatre actor and radio presenter. He was known for his three-octave tenor voice.

== Life and career ==
Karel Černoch was born on 12 October 1943 in Prague. As a child, he was in a children's choir. He attended singing and guitar at a folk art school, but he did not finish his studies at the secondary art school and worked as a props maker at Barrandov Studios. He started singing in 1962. When he went to compulsory military service that year, he met Jiří Grossmann and Miloslav Šimek and founded a theatre group with them.

After his military service, he began to devote himself to big beat. In the late 1960s, he sang several hits with the band Juventus that made him famous. His first song to be played on the radio was Nářek převozníka ('The ferryman's lament'). In 1969, he won the Bratislavská lýra prize for the best song with the song Píseň o mé zemi ('Song about my country'). However, because of it, and because of his protest song Zlej sen ('Bad dream') and because of his contribution to the protest song Modlitba pro Martu ('A prayer for Marta') of Marta Kubišová, the communist regime in Czechoslovakia banned Černoch from performing for several years.

From 1972, he worked in the Ateliér Theatre. In the late 1970s, he turned to country music and sang with Jiří Brabec and Naďa Urbánková. In the 1980s, he performed with orchestras of Karel Vlach, Gustav Brom, Josef Vobruba and Václav Hybš.

Černoch appeared in various shows on television and radio, sometiems as their presenter. His comedy skits with his friend Jiří Wimmer in theatre and TV shows became famous. He cooperated with Wimmer for 15 years until Wimmer's tragical death in 2001.

In the last decade of his life, Černoch has focused primarily on acting and singing in musicals. He appeared in the musicals Dracula, Monte Cristo, Evita and Les Misérables. Černoch died of colorectal cancer on 27 December 2007 at his home in Prague, aged 64. He was buried at his family tomb at the Olšany Cemetery in Prague.

Černoch was appreciated for his distinctive three-octave tenor. He had perfect singing technique, was able to sing difficult passages with ease, and knew how to adapt to different musical genres.

== Family ==
His son Marek Černoch (born 1969) is a politician and TV presenter. His daughter Tereza Černochová (born 1983) is a singer.
