= Ladislav Lábus =

Czech architect and university teacher (born 1951)

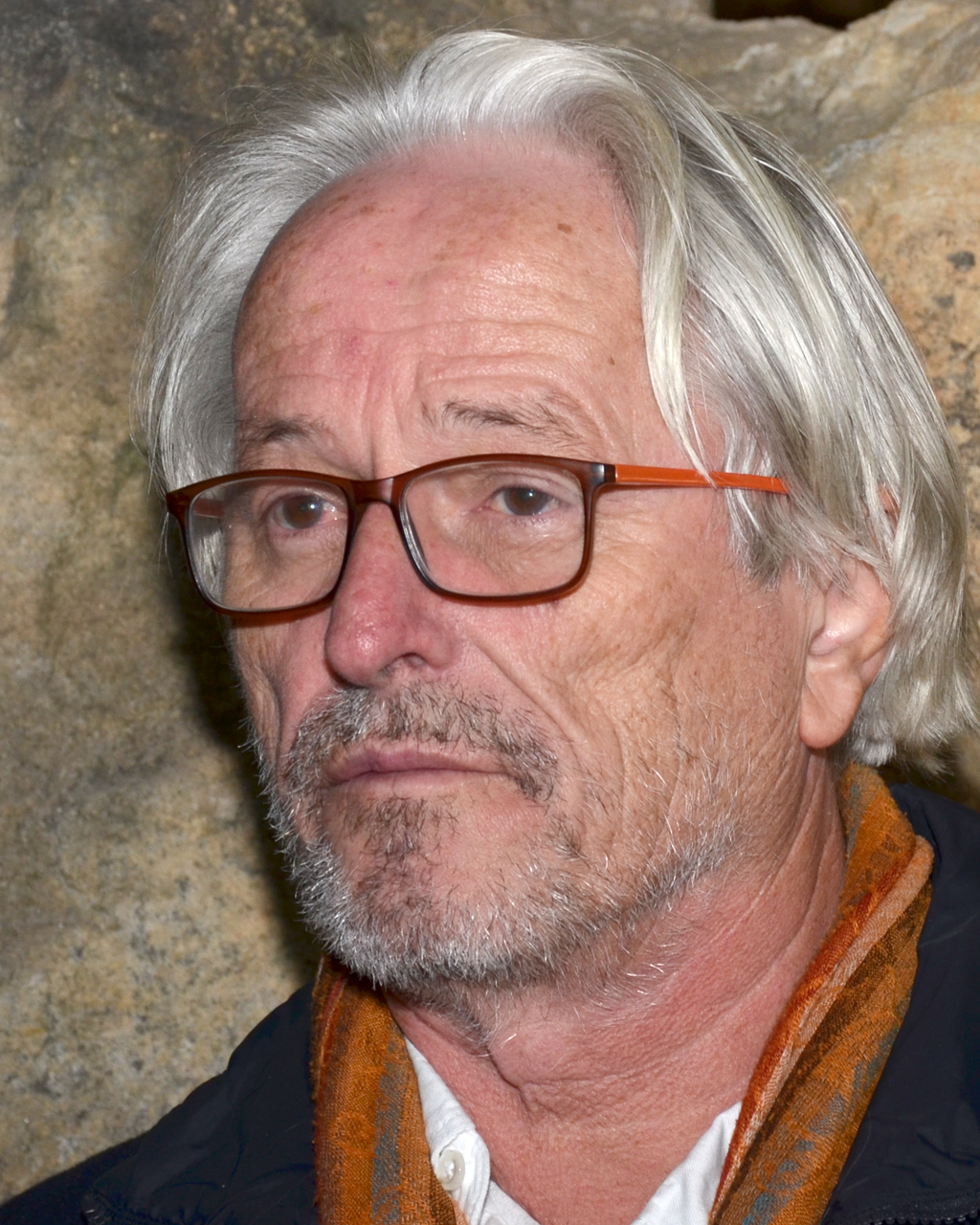
Ladislav Lábus (2018)

Ladislav Lábus (born 21 November 1951 in Prague) is a Czech architect and university teacher. He is brother of the Czech actor Jiří Lábus.
