= Slunce, seno a pár facek =

Sun, hay and a couple of smacks
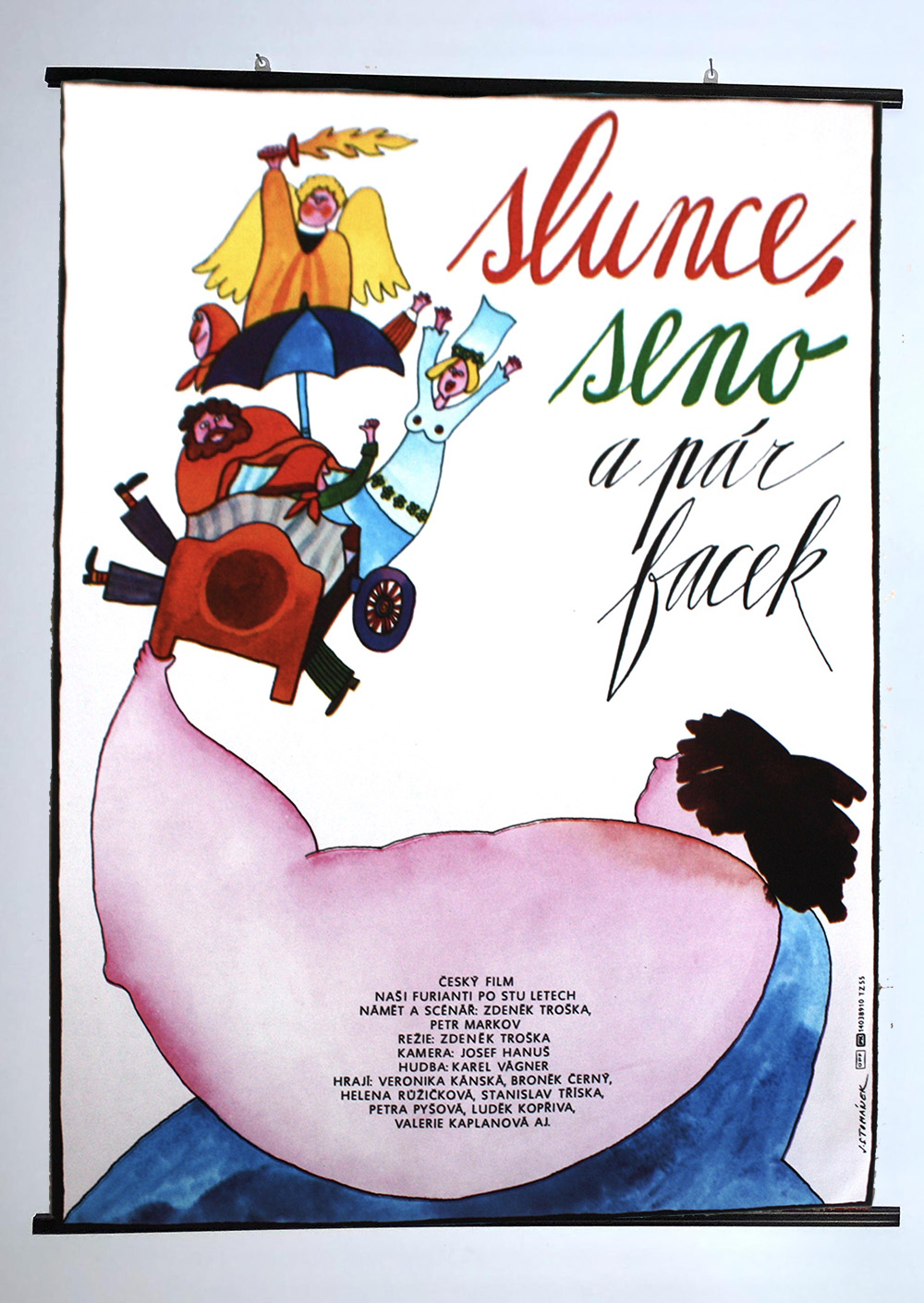
- film poster by Jan S. Tománek
- Directed by: Zdeněk Troška
- Written by: Petr Markov, Zdeněk Troška
- Starring: Miroslav Zounar; Vlastimila Vlková; Helena Růžičková; Jaroslava Kretschmerová
- Cinematography: Josef Hanuš
- Edited by: Eva Bobková
- Release date: 1989
- Running time: 128 minutes
- Country: Czechoslovakia
- Language: Czech

Slunce, seno a pár facek (Sun, hay and a couple of smacks) is a Czech comedy film depicting life in one of the country's rural regions. It was released in 1989.

== Cast ==
- Helena Růžičková as Mařena Škopková, Blažena's mother
- Stanislav Tříska as Vladimír Škopek, Blažena's father
- Valerie Kaplanová as grandmother Škopková
- Veronika Kánská as Blažena Škopková
- Bronislav Černý as plumber Venca Konopník
- Marie Pilátová as Vlasta Konopníková, Venca's mother
- Václav Troška as Konopník, Venca's father
- Petra Pyšová as waitress Miluna
- Luděk Kopřiva as parish priest Otík
- Vlastimila Vlková as priest's housekeeper Cecilka
- Jiří Lábus as inseminator Béďa
- Jiřina Jirásková as Václavka Hubičková
- Pavel Vondruška as secretary Mošna
- Miroslav Zounar as Chairman of the JZD Pepa Rádl
- Jaroslava Kretschmerová as secretary of the JZD, nickname Evík
- Marie Švecová as Mařenka Kelišová, nickname Keliška
- Jiří Růžička as fat Josef
- Josef Stárek as Karel Kroupa, doctor
- Kateřina Lojdová as Gabriela Tejfarová, M. Sc.
