= King Thrushbeard (film) =

1984 film

- Directed by: Miroslav Luther
- Based on: Grimm Brothers fairy-tale Red Beard
- Starring: Adriana Tarábková, Lukáš Vaculík, Maria Schell
- Production company: ZDF
- Distributed by: Omnia-Film München, Slovenská filmová tvorba Bratislava
- Release date: 1984
- Countries: Czechoslovakia (now Slovakia); Germany
- Languages: Slovak and German

King Thrushbeard (Slovak: Kráľ Drozdia brada, German: König Drosselbart) is a 1984 Czechoslovak film based on an adaptation of the Grimm Brothers fairy-tale Red Beard.

== Plot ==
Princess Anna mockingly rejects each of her suitors. Her father, angered her by her conduct, forces her to marry a travelling beggar. After experiencing poverty and manual labor, Anna learns humility and reforms her deposition.

== Cast ==
- Adriana Tarábková
- Lukáš Vaculík
- Zita Furková
- Maria Schell
- Gerhard Olschewski
- Marián Labuda
- Bronislav Poloczek
- Peter Šimun
- Vlado Černý
- František Kovár
- Peter Bzdúch
- Ľudovít Kroner
- Michal Gučík
- Tucker Boone
