= Helluva Good Luck =

1999 Czech fantasy film

- DVD cover
- Directed by: Zdeněk Troška
- Written by: Zdeněk Troška
- Starring: Miroslav Šimůnek, Michaela Kuklová
- Cinematography: Juraj Fándli
- Edited by: Dalibor Lipský
- Music by: Karel Svoboda
- Distributed by: Bontonfilm – Alfa
- Release date: 1999
- Running time: 111 minutes
- Country: Czech Republic
- Language: Czech

Helluva Good Luck (Czech: Z pekla štěstí) is a 1999 Czech fantasy film directed by Zdeněk Troška. It is inspired by Jan Drda's story "Brave Honza". A sequel was released in 2001.

== Plot ==
The film is about a youngster Jan, who falls in love with Markéta. She serves at Castle. Jan is forced to a journey. He retrieves a napkin, allowing him to be invisible, and defeats a dragon.

== Cast ==
- Miroslav Šimůnek as Jan
- Michaela Kuklová as Markéta
- Daniel Hůlka as Brambas
- Vladimír Brabec as King
- Sabina Laurinová as Princess Eufrozína
- Lukáš Vaculík as Kujbaba
