= Metanol =

2018 Czech television series

- Poster
- Written by: Lenka Szántó; Matěj Podzimek
- Directed by: Tereza Kopáčová
- Starring: Lukáš Vaculík; Martin Finger; Veronika Freimanová
- Music by: David Hlaváč
- Country of origin: Czech Republic
- Original language: Czech

Production
- Cinematography: Pavel Berkovič
- Running time: 179 minutes
- Production company: Czech Television

Original release
- Release: 22 April – 29 April 2018

Metanol (lit. 'Methanol') is a 2018 two-part Czech film based on the 2012 Czech Republic methanol poisonings. The first part premiered on 22 April 2018 and had 1,350,000 views, whilst the second part premiered on 29 April 2018 and had 1,225,000. The film was viewed by 500,000 audiences on Czech Television internet portal.

== Cast ==
- Lukáš Vaculík as Jiří Milota
- David Máj as Rudolf Fulín
- Tomáš Bambušek as Tomáš Sikora
- Kristýna Ryška as Iveta Ožanová
- Dušan Sitek as Josef Gawlas
- Veronika Freimanová as Jaroslava Gawlasová
- Martin Finger as Captain Tomáš Zakopal
- Vasil Fridrich as Captain Marek Hálek
- Roman Zach as Roman Chalaš
- Vladimír Kratina as Karel Chmiela
- Marta Falvey Sovová as Alena Fulínová
- Jiří Kout as Prosecutor Marek Straka
- Ondřej Nosálek as Prosecutor Pavel Nebeský
- Jiří Hána as Analyst Hána
- Petr Halíček as Analys Trachta
- Lívia Bielovič Sabol as Světlana Sikorová
- Alena Doláková as Marie Podleská
- Lukáš Melnik as Martin Frýda

== Reception ==
The film has received generally positive reviews from critics. It holds 73% at Kinobox.
