= Leona Machálková =

Czech singer

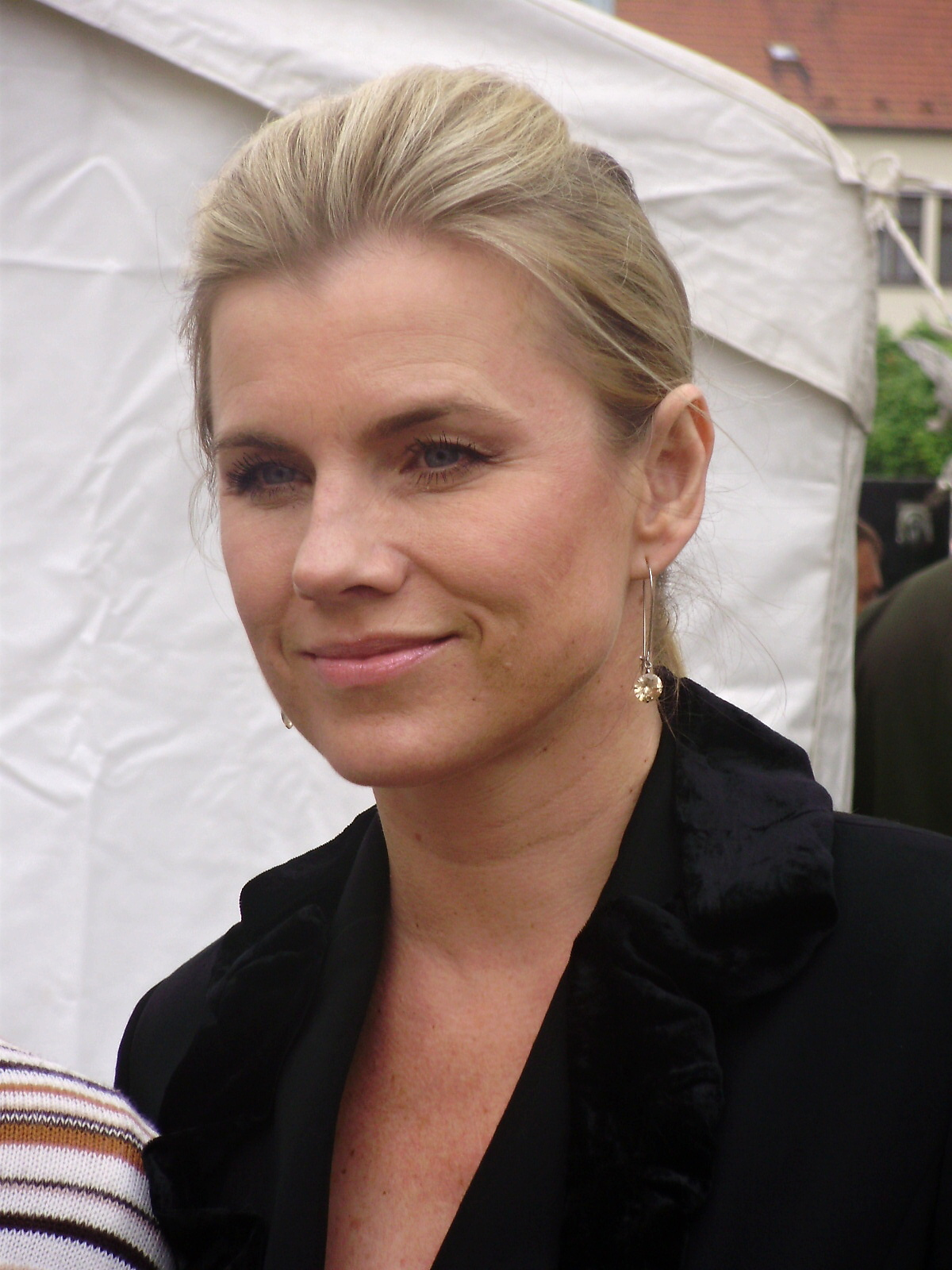
- Leona Machálková in 2010

Background information
- Born: May 24, 1967 (age 57)
- Origin: Zlín, Czechoslovakia
- Occupation: Singer
- Years active: 1991–present
- Labels: WEA; Monitor; Master Music
- Website: leonamachalkova.cz

Leona Machálková (born 24 May 1967) is a Czech singer. She had a starring role in the musical Monte Cristo, which premiered in 2000, and became the most expensive Czech musical. She went on to star in the 2003 version of the Czech musical Dracula. The launch of her 2005 album Voda Divoká was attended by former president Václav Havel.

== Discography ==
=== Studio albums ===
- 1998: Film & Muzikál
- 1999: Film & Muzikál II
- 2001: Blízká Setkání
- 2005: Voda Divoká
- 2006: Leona
