= Trhala fialky dynamitem =

1992 Czech comedy film

- Directed by: Milan Růžička
- Written by: Helena Růžičková; Milan Růžička; Jiří Růžička
- Starring: Helena Růžičková; Milan Růžička; Jiří Růžička; Valentina Thielová; Lubomír Kostelka; Jitka Asterová
- Cinematography: Josef Pávek
- Music by: Milan Dvořák
- Production company: Prague
- Release date: 1992
- Languages: Czech; English subtitles

Trhala fialky dynamitem is a 1992 Czech comedy film a Czech family, that decides after the Velvet revolution to start a business in new market conditions. The heroes of the spectacle are the numerous Karafiát family, who decide to abandon their previous livelihood (stealing mourning wreaths and transforming them into artfully tied bouquets) and start a business. The unusual travel agency Český raj, built on the ingenious idea of not taking poor Czech tourists abroad, but on the contrary, rich foreigners to the Czech Republic, will see the light of day. Thanks to a peculiar advertising campaign, it is possible to fill a bus in Paris with a motley mix of French people and set off. However, this is just the beginning of the Karafiát family's business concerns.
