= Slunce, seno, erotika =

1991 Czech comedy film

- DVD cover
- Directed by: Zdeněk Troška
- Written by: Petr Markov; Zdeněk Troška
- Starring: Helena Růžičková; Jiří Lábus
- Cinematography: Josef Hanuš
- Edited by: Eva Bobková
- Music by: Karel Vágner
- Distributed by: Nationalfilm Praha
- Release date: 1991
- Running time: 103 minutes
- Country: Czechoslovakia
- Language: Czech

Slunce, seno, erotika (lit. 'Sun, hay, erotics') is a Czech comedy film. It was released in 1991.

== Cast ==
- Helena Růžičková as Mařena Škopková, Blažena's mother
- Stanislav Tříska as Vladimír Škopek, Blažena's father
- Valerie Kaplanová as grandmother Škopková
- Veronika Kánská as Blažena Škopková
- Bronislav Černý as plumber Venca Konopník
- Marie Pilátová as Vlasta Konopníková, Venca's mother
- Václav Troška as Konopník, Venca's father
- Petra Pyšová as waitress Miluna
- Luděk Kopřiva as parish priest Otík
- Vlastimila Vlková as priest's housekeeper Cecilka
- Jiří Lábus as inseminator Béďa
- Jiřina Jirásková as Václavka Hubičková
- Pavel Vondruška as secretary Mošna
- Miroslav Zounar as Chairman of the JZD Pepa Rádl
- Jaroslava Kretschmerová as secretary of the JZD, nickname Evík
- Marie Švecová as Mařenka Kelišová, nickname Keliška
- Jiří Růžička as fat Josef
- Josef Stárek as Karel Kroupa, doctor
- Kateřina Lojdová as Gabriela Tejfarová, M.Sc.
- Oldřich Kaiser as Vincenzo
- Martin Dejdar as Bernardo
