= Vlak dětství a naděje =

- Directed by: Karel Kachyňa
- Starring: Stanislav Zindulka, Helena Růžičková, Žaneta Fuchsová, Tereza Brodská
- Country of origin: Czechoslovakia
- Original language: Czech
- No. of seasons: 1
- No. of episodes: 6

Production
- Editor: Jiří Brožek
- Running time: 60 minutes

Original release
- Network: Czechoslovak Television
- Release: 4 March – 8 April 1989

Vlak dětství a naděje (The Train of Childhood and Hope) is a Czechoslovak television series directed by Karel Kachyňa first broadcast in 1989 with Stanislav Zindulka, Žaneta Fuchsová, Tereza Brodská and Helena Růžičková in the main roles. The series is based on Věra Sládková's novel trilogy Malý muž a velká žena (Little Man and Big Woman), parts of which are The Last Train from Frývaldov (1974), The Regiments of Evil (1975) and The Child of a Freewoman (1982). Although the series was filmed in 1985, it was not broadcast until 1989 due to censorship.

== Cast ==
- Žaneta Fuchsová as Verka (Child)
- Tereza Brodská as Verka (Teenager)
- Stanislav Zindulka as Verka's Father Josef Pumplme
- Helena Růžičková as Anna Urbanova
- Bohumila Dolejšová as Verka's Mother
- František Husák as Jarousek Vemola
- Vladimír Javorský as Barber Sepp
- Zdeněk Řehoř as Dentist Steiner
- Jiřina Třebická as Ema
- Alena Vránová as Breberova
- Jiří Langmajer as Soldier Pavel
- Pavel Pochylý as Verka's Boyfriend Milan
- Eva Svobodová as Verka's Grandmother
- Vladimír Hlavatý as Verka's Grandfather
- Lubomír Kostelka as Baker Tyc
- Vlastimil Bedrna as Uncle Frantisek
- Eva Řepíková as Aunt Amalka
- Karel Linc as Prisvinger
- Oto Ševčík as Alfred Dorn

== Episodes ==
1. Sněhurčina smrt (Snow White's Death)
2. Malý muž a velká žena (Little Man and Big Woman)
3. Trápení kocoura Žolyho (Suffering of Žoly the Cat)
4. Válka si nevybírá (War Doesn't Choose)
5. Moje druhá první láska (My Second First Love)
6. Návrat domů (Returning Home)
