= Slatina (Klatovy District) =

- Municipality
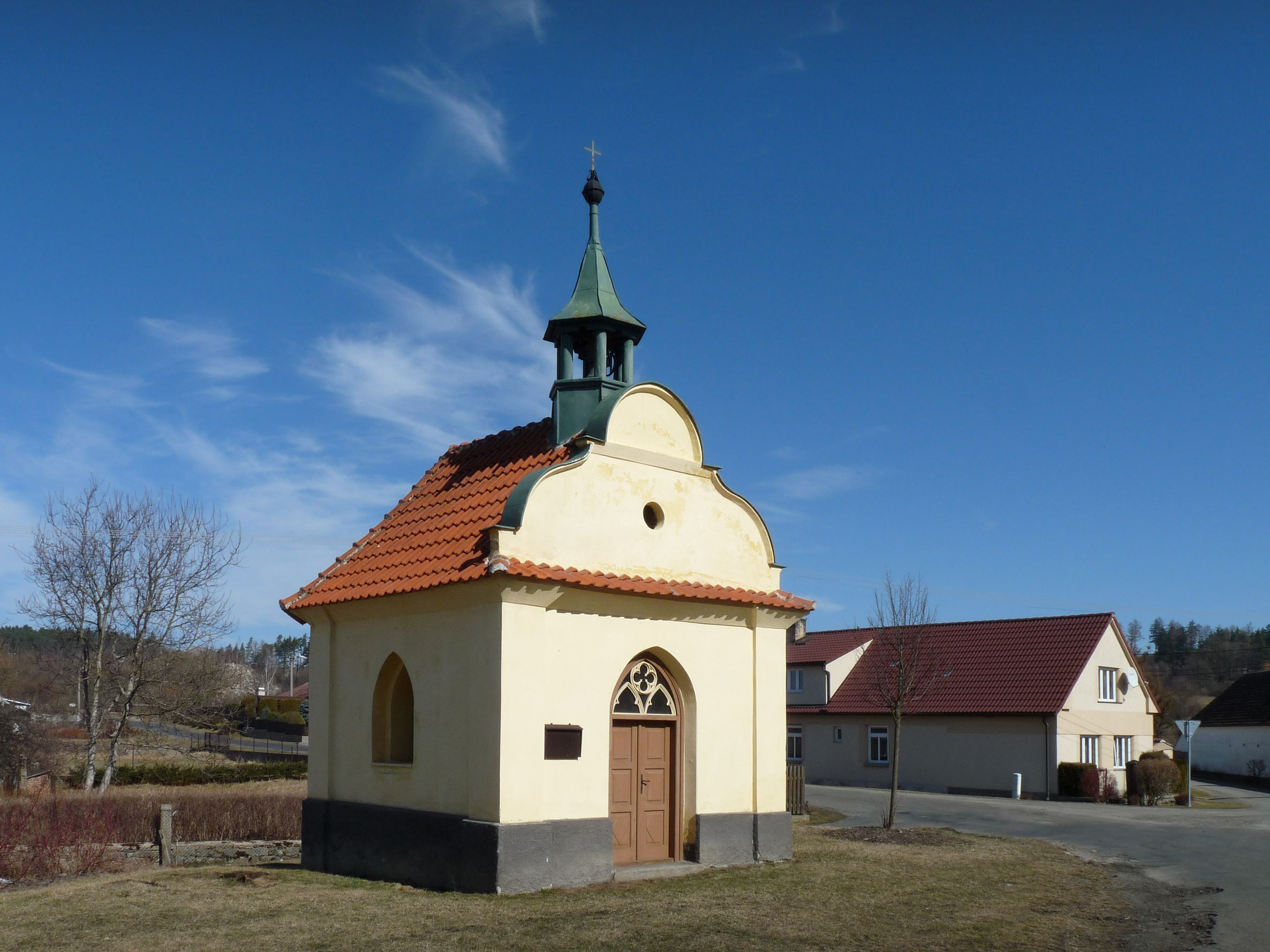
- Chapel of Saint John of Nepomuk

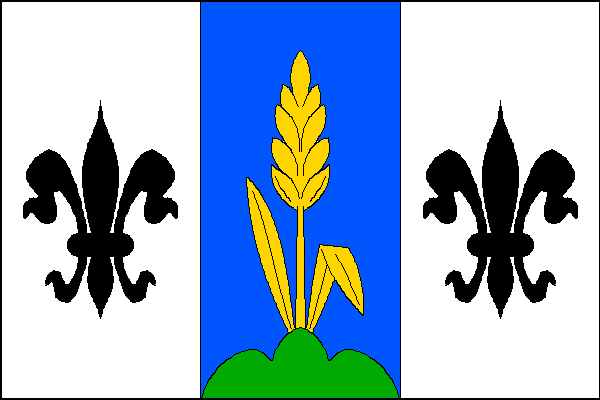
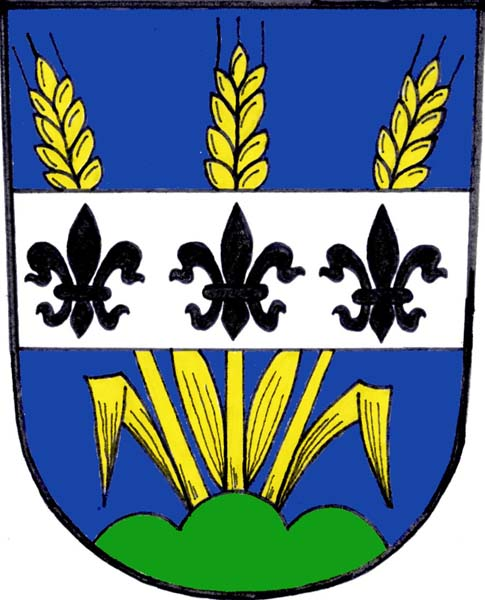
- Flag Coat of arms

- Location in the Czech Republic
- Coordinates: 49°23′16″N 13°44′39″E
- Country: Czech Republic
- Region: Plzeň
- District: Klatovy
- First mentioned: 1254

Area
  - Total: 5.65 km^{2} (2.18 sq mi)
- Elevation: 430 m (1,410 ft)

Population (2026-01-01)
  - Total: 91
  - Density: 16/km^{2} (42/sq mi)
- Time zone: UTC+1 (CET)
  - Summer (DST): UTC+2 (CEST)
- Postal code: 341 01
- Website: www.obec-slatina.eu

Slatina is a municipality and village in Klatovy District in the Plzeň Region of the Czech Republic. It has about 90 inhabitants.

Slatina lies approximately 34 kilometres (21 mi) east of Klatovy, 49 km (30 mi) south-east of Plzeň, and 92 km (57 mi) south-west of Prague.

== Demographics ==
Historical population
Year	Pop.	±%
1869	443	—
1880	447	+0.9%
1890	369	−17.4%
1900	357	−3.3%
1910	325	−9.0%
1921	291	−10.5%
1930	275	−5.5%
1950	184	−33.1%
1961	186	+1.1%
1970	168	−9.7%
1980	153	−8.9%
1991	123	−19.6%
2001	119	−3.3%
2011	110	−7.6%
2021	96	−12.7%
Source: Censuses

== Notable people ==
- Helena Růžičková (1936–2004), actress; lived here
