= Strážce duší =

- Directed by: Dušan Klein; Juraj Deák
- Starring: Lukáš Vaculík; Zuzana Norisová; David Suchařípa
- Country of origin: Czech Republic
- Original language: Czech
- No. of seasons: 2
- No. of episodes: 13

Production
- Running time: 53 minutes

Original release
- Network: Czech Television
- Release: 2005 – 2009

Strážce duší (Guardian of Souls) is a Czech adventure television series produced by Czech Television.

== About series ==
The series tells stories of the Guardian of Souls. Writer Viktor Armín and student Kateřina Nelserová try to uncover mysterious events in which the inexplicable past meets the present because nothing is as we thought. Across the ocean of all eternity roam the guardians of souls. The yäre guided by many laws of providence to guard what is to remain hidden and instead reveal only what is to be revealed. In the service of fate, they take on human form, but their faces are only allowed to be seen by a select few.

The first 6 parts were filmed in 2003 by the creative group Arichteva-Prachařová with directors Dušan Klein and Juraj Deák. In 2004, 3 more parts were shot and the last 4 in 2007/2008. The first 9 episodes were broadcast in 2005 while last 4 episodes were broadcast in 2009.

== Cast ==
- Lukáš Vaculík as Viktor Armín
- Zuzana Norisová as Kateřina Nelserová
- David Suchařípa as guardian of souls
- Jiří Dvořák as captain Valdek
- David Viktora as pathologist Dvořáček
- Ilja Racek as professor Bejlovec
- Jana Hubinská as Baková
- Tomáš Jirman as parish priest
- Anna Cónová as housekeeper Anna
