= Jiří Lábus =

Czech actor (born 1950)

- Lábus in 2026
- Born: 26 January 1950 (age 76); Prague, Czechoslovakia
- Occupation: Actor
- Years active: 1977–present

Jiří Lábus (born 26 January 1950) is a Czech actor, comedian and voice actor.

== Career ==
Jiří Lábus was born on 26 January 1950 in Prague. From a young age, Jiří Lábus was fascinated by theatre and cinema, often attending performances and listening to radio plays. After completing his secondary education, he enrolled at the Academy of Performing Arts in Prague, graduating in 1973 with a role as Mackie Messer in The Threepenny Opera. During his military service, he was a member of the Army Art Ensemble, where he worked as a master of ceremonies for the dance orchestra. His brother is the Czech architect Ladislav Lábus.

In 1972, Lábus became a permanent member of the Studio Ypsilon theatre ensemble, which relocated from Liberec to Prague in 1978. He performed several roles in both television and film. He gained popularity in Germany for his role of evil wizard Rumburak in the TV series Arabela.

Lábus has frequently collaborated with his longtime colleague Oldřich Kaiser in various television and radio programs. Together with Kaiser, he performed as a comedy duo "Kaiser a Lábus", which, in particular, took part in the TV comedy shows Ruská ruleta (Russian Roulette, 1994) and Možná přijde i kouzelník ("Perhaps a Magician Will Come Too", 1982).Since 1991, they have produced the radio series Tlučhořovi.

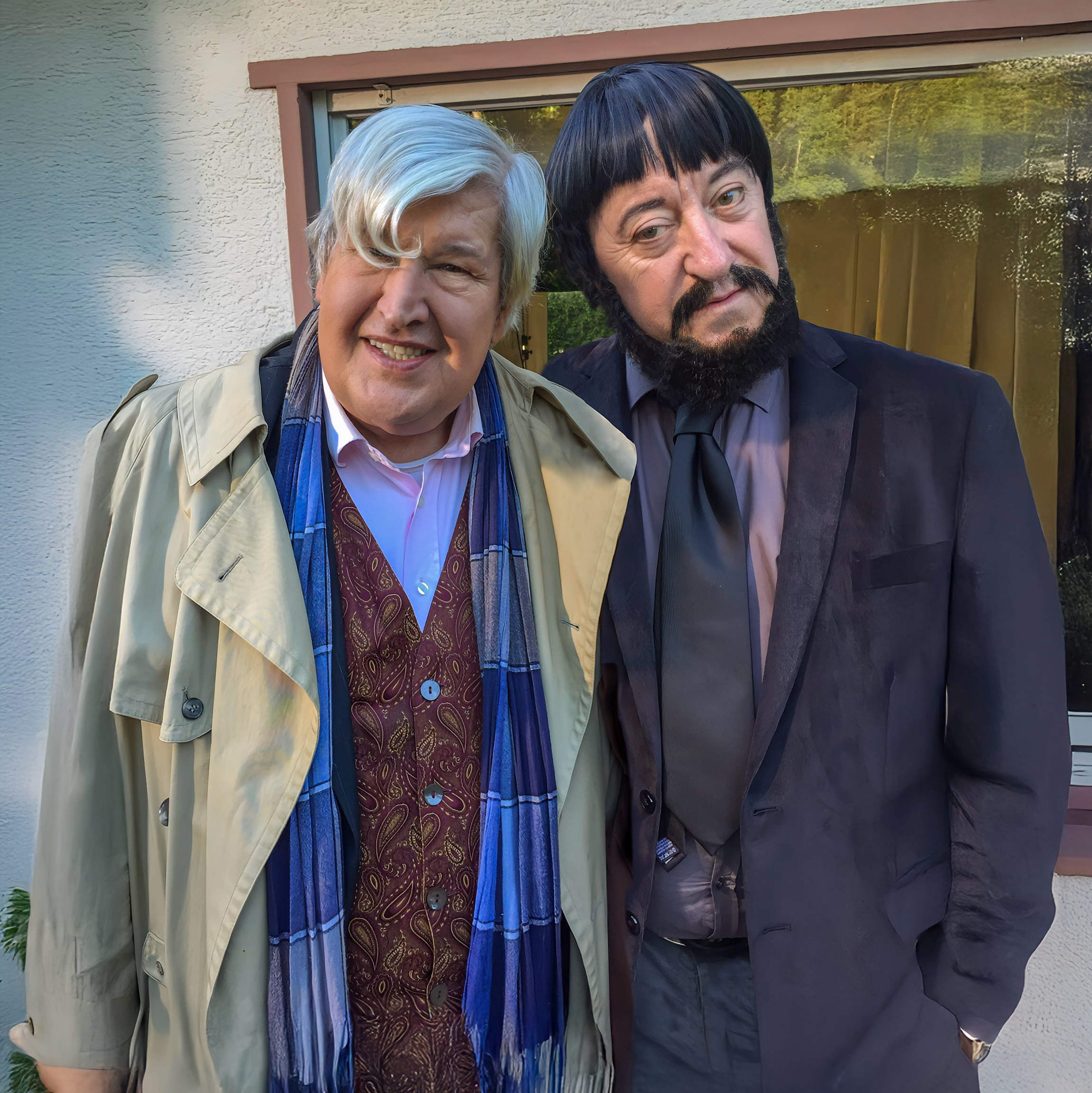
Jiří Lábus together with German actor Helmut Krauss during filming in Baden-Baden

Throughout his career, Lábus has received several accolades for his acting. In 1994, he won the Czech Lion Award for Best Supporting Actor for his role as Uncle Jakob in Vladimír Michálek's film America. He received the Thalia Award in 1996 for his performance in The Head of Medusa. In 2013, he was honored with another Czech Lion Award for his supporting role in the film Clownwise. Additionally, in 2012, he was awarded the "Golden Shoe" at the Zlín Film Festival for his contributions to children's and youth film production.

In 2015, Lábus appeared alongside George Hardy, Katy Karrenbauer, and Krauss in Eric Hordes' film Under ConTroll, reprising his role as Rumburak. The film was released in 2020.

== Voice acting ==
Jiří Lábus is also an accomplished voice actor. In the 1980s, he gave his voice to a stuffed moderator called Jů in the popular children's TV show Studio Kamarád. He also gave his voice to Marge Simpson in the Czech adaptation of The Simpsons, to the narrator of TV series M.A.S.H., and to ground sloth Sid in Ice Age. His voice acting extends to video games, including roles in Ve stínu havrana and the Czech game series Polda.

== Other activities ==
In 1978, Lábus appeared in the communist propaganda series Thirty Cases of Major Zeman, in an episode aimed at discrediting the underground band The Plastic People of the Universe. He later publicly apologized to the band and the public.

In 2001, he narrated the Czech audiobook version of Harry Potter and the Philosopher's Stone for Albatros Publishing. In 2005, he and Petr Čtvrtníček garnered attention with the satirical play Ivánku, kamaráde, můžeš mluvit?, based on wiretapped conversations of corrupt football officials.

In 2014, he portrayed Czechoslovak Prime Minister Ladislav Adamec in the historical TV miniseries České století.

Lábus was also the face of a 2007 government initiative supporting the U.S. missile defense radar in the Czech Republic.

He is an advocate for the monarchy and was among the signatories of the 1999 manifesto Na prahu nového milénia, authored by Petr Placák.

== Selected performances ==
- 2005 – The referee in Ivánek, my friend (Ivánku, kamaráde. Based on wiretrapped phone calls, revealing bribery in Czech football)
- 2003 – Edgar in Play Strindberg by Friedrich Dürrenmatt, Divadlo Ungelt, winner of an unofficial poll organized by portal i-divadlo
- 1996 – Antoine Boneau in Tete de Meduse by Boris Vian, received Thálie Award
- 1991 – Casanova in Mozart in Prague
- Kecal in The Bartered Bride
- Celestin in Mam'zelle Nitouche

== Selected filmography ==
- 1977 – Tomorrow I'll Wake Up and Scald Myself with Tea
- 1979 – Arabela (TV series)
- 1983 – Slunce, seno, jahody
- 1982 – Srdečný pozdrav ze zeměkoule
- 1984 – Rumburak
- 1989 – Slunce, seno a pár facek
- 1991 – Slunce, seno, erotika
- 1993 – Arabela se vrací ("Arabela Returns")
- 1994 – Amerika, received Czech Lion Award as best supporting actor
- 1996 – Forgotten Light
- 2006 – I Served the King of England
- 2008 – Goat Story – The Old Prague Legends (voice of Goat)
- 2012 – Goat Story with Cheese (voice of Goat)
- 2019 – Owners
- 2020 – Under ConTroll
