= Přítelkyně z domu smutku (TV series) =

- Genre: Drama
- Directed by: Hynek Bočan
- Starring: Ivana Chýlková
- Country of origin: Czechoslovakia
- Original language: Czech
- No. of seasons: 1
- No. of episodes: 4

Production
- Running time: 70 minutes

Original release
- Network: Czech Television
- Release: 1992 – 1992

Přítelkyně z domu smutku (Czech: My Companions in the Bleak House is a 1992 four-part Czech miniseries starring Ivana Chýlková. It was based on a book of the same name by Eva Kantůrková. The book has autobiographical features - the author was imprisoned for almost a year in the detention prison Prague-Ruzyně when she was accused of a crime of subversion of the republic. In the end, she was released and the trial never took place (it was just another of the Communist regime's tricks to keep people inconvenient to it in check). In the series, the main character does not directly bear the author's name. Instead, she is referred to as Mrs. Marta. Series was awarded at the MTF in Cannes by the Grand Silver Prize in the series category and by the Grand Gold Prize for the acting performance of Ivana Chylková. The series, filmed in an authentic prison environment, has episodes: 1. House of Sorrow. 2. The Andes. 3. Helga. 4. Girlfriend from the house of sorrow.

The story depicts life in a remand prison and the fate of female inmates – why they got into prison, what crime they committed, if they committed any at all, what kind of environment they come from, etc. Their purely criminal offenses contrast with the "criminal activity" of the main character, who goes to prison she got only for publishing her books abroad, but which the other female inmates think is a big case against them.

Both the book and the series describe in detail the author's feelings in prison; in the series, more emphasis is placed on describing the interrogations with the investigator. However, through the description of individual characters and their fates and behavior after imprisonment, the reality of life under socialism in the 1970s and 1980s in the Czechoslovak Republic, including the unequal position of women in society and the manipulation of the truth by law enforcement agencies, is presented in detail.

== Cast ==
- Ivana Chýlková – Marta
- Veronika Žilková – prison guard
- Yvetta Blanarovičová – Majka
- Aňa Geislerová – Líba
- Pavel Nový – Marta's husband
- František Řehák – priest
- Jaroslav Šmíd – prison guard
- Michal Dlouhý – investigator
- Bohuslav Čáp – Majka's father
- Blažena Holišová – Majka's mother
- Václav Vydra
- Otakar Brousek ml. – prisoner
- Michaela Kuklová – Evička
- Ilona Svobodová – prison physician
- Jiřina Bohdalová – Helenka
- Helena Růžičková – Helga
