= Andělská tvář =

- Directed by: Zdeněk Troška
- Screenplay by: Hana Marie Körnerová, Zdeněk Troška
- Based on: Hana Marie Körnerová's Angelic Face
- Produced by: Jiří Pomeje
- Starring: Michaela Kuklová, Jiří Pomeje, Filip Blažek, Dana Morávková
- Cinematography: Jaroslav Brabec
- Edited by: Dalibor Lipský
- Music by: Petr Malásek
- Production company: Fronda Film
- Distributed by: Bontonfilm
- Release date: 14 March 2002
- Running time: 118 minutes
- Country: Czech Republic
- Language: Czech
- Budget: 70 million CZK
- Box office: 4.6 million CZK

Andělská tvář (translates as Angelic Face) is a 2002 Czech adventure romance film directed by Zdeněk Troška. It is based on a novel by Marie Körnerová of the same name. The film was very expensive and producer Jiří Pomeje lend money from State Fund for the Support and Development of Czech Cinematography, but Pomeje was unable to pay his debt, since the film was commercial failure. Pomeje was then investigated for financial fraud.

== Cast ==
- Michaela Kuklová as Charlotta Collierová
- Filip Blažek as Raoul De Mornay
- Jiří Pomeje as Filip De Mornay
- Dana Morávková as Margot Pinaudová
- Naďa Konvalinková as Richterová
- Miriam Kantorková as Midwife
- Jitka Ježková as Fauberg's sister
- Květa Fialová as Mother Superior
- Josef Vinklář as Judge Pinaud
- Marek Vašut as Lecierc
- Jan Přeučil as Parson
- Jiří Krampol as Ludvík
