= Přechovice =

- Municipality
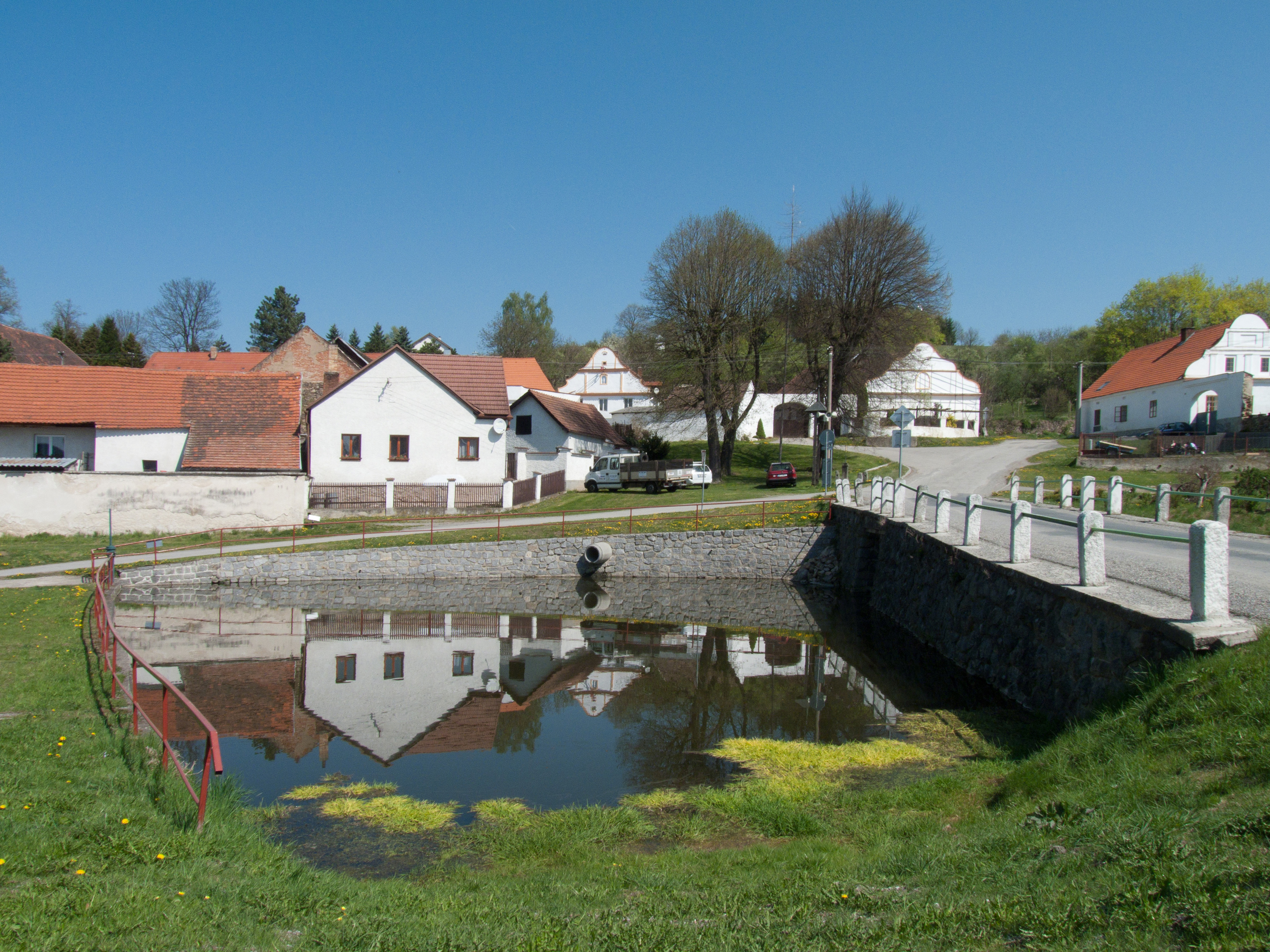
- Centre of Přechovice

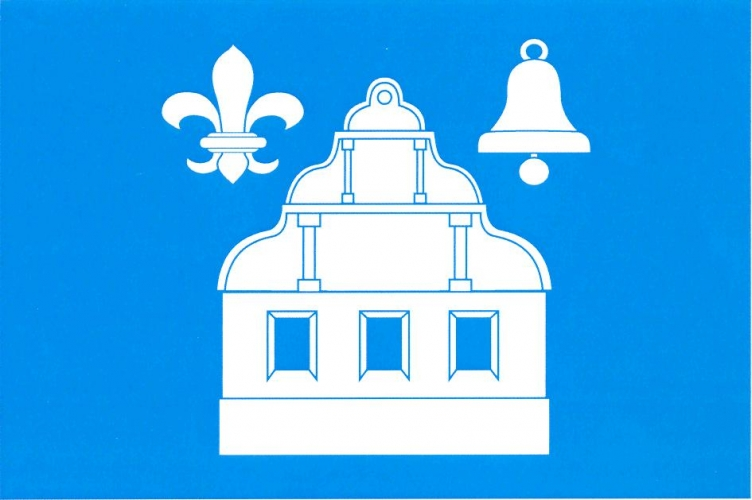
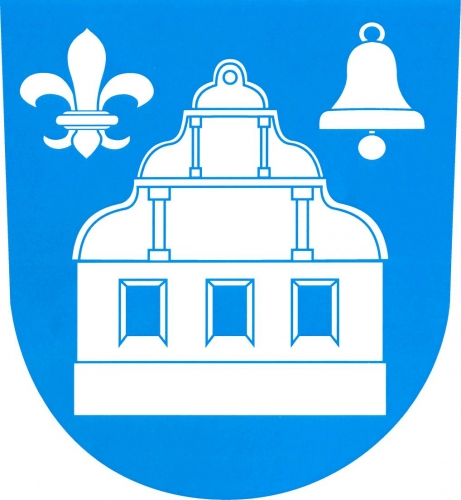
- Flag Coat of arms

- Location in the Czech Republic
- Coordinates: 49°10′47″N 13°53′41″E
- Country: Czech Republic
- Region: South Bohemian
- District: Strakonice
- First mentioned: 1400

Area
  - Total: 3.96 km^{2} (1.53 sq mi)
- Elevation: 445 m (1,460 ft)

Population (2026-01-01)
  - Total: 149
  - Density: 37.6/km^{2} (97.5/sq mi)
- Time zone: UTC+1 (CET)
  - Summer (DST): UTC+2 (CEST)
- Postal code: 387 01
- Website: www.obecprechovice.cz

Přechovice is a municipality and village in Strakonice District in the South Bohemian Region of the Czech Republic. It has about 100 inhabitants.

== Etymology ==
The name is derived from the personal name Přech, meaning "the village of Přech's people".

== Geography ==
Přechovice is located about 9 kilometres (6 mi) south of Strakonice and 47 km (29 mi) northwest of České Budějovice. It lies in the Bohemian Forest Foothills. The highest point is the hill Manina at 640 m (2,100 ft) above sea level. The municipality is situated on the right bank of the Volyňka River.

== History ==
The first written mention of Přechovice is from 1400, when the village was owned by the Metropolitan Chapter at Saint Vitus in Prague.

Between 1961 and 1990, Přechovice was a municipal part of Hoštice. SInce 1990, it has been again a separate municipality.

== Demographics ==
Historical population

Year	Pop.	±%
1869	237	—
1880	235	−0.8%
1890	246	+4.7%
1900	241	−2.0%
1910	252	+4.6%

Year	Pop.	±%
1921	240	−4.8%
1930	222	−7.5%
1950	177	−20.3%
1961	157	−11.3%
1970	113	−28.0%

Year	Pop.	±%
1980	110	−2.7%
1991	116	+5.5%
2001	104	−10.3%
2011	99	−4.8%
2021	133	+34.3%

Source: Censuses

== Transport ==
Přechovice is located on the railway line Strakonice–Volary. The train stop in Přechovice is named Hoštice u Volyně after the neighbouring municipality of Hoštice.

== Sights ==
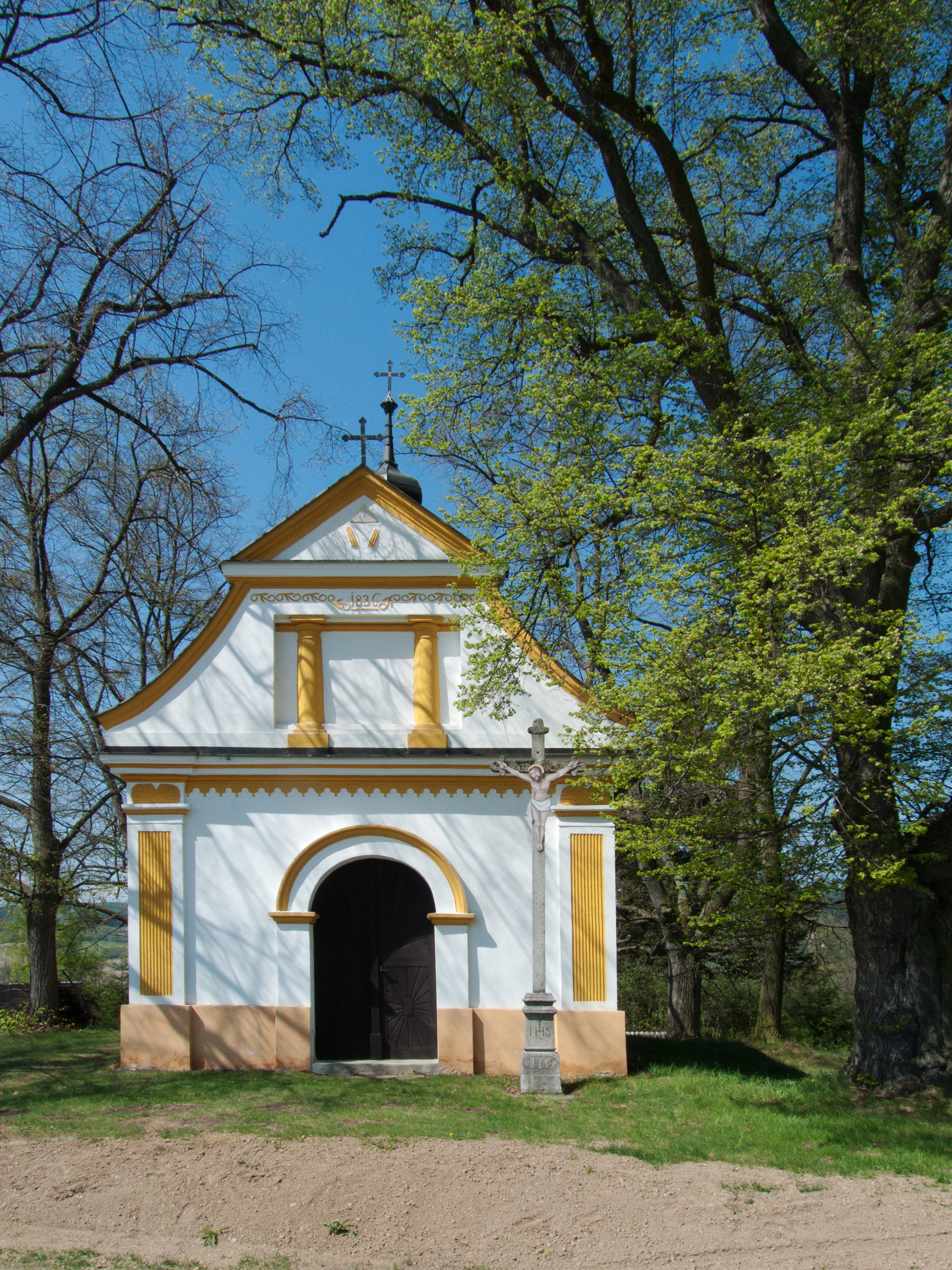
Chapel of Saint Anne

The main landmark of Přechovice is the Chapel of Saint Anne Chapel. It was built in 1836. The stone cross in front of the chapel dates from 1861.
