= Helluva Good Luck 2 =

2001 film by Zdeněk Troška

- DVD cover
- Directed by: Zdeněk Troška
- Written by: Evžen Gogela, Zdeněk Troška
- Starring: Michaela Kuklová, Miroslav Šimůnek
- Cinematography: Jaroslav Brabec
- Edited by: Dalibor Lipský
- Music by: Petr Malásek
- Distributed by: FALCON, a. s.
- Release date: 2001
- Running time: 102 minutes
- Country: Czech Republic
- Language: Czech

Helluva Good Luck 2 (Czech: Z pekla štěstí 2) is a 2001 Czech fantasy film directed by Zdeněk Troška. It is a sequel to Helluva Good Luck. The film stars Michaela Kuklová and Miroslav Šimůnek. Karel Gott appeared in a supporting role as Lucifer and God.

== Cast ==
- Michaela Kuklová as Markéta
- Miroslav Šimůnek as Jan
- Vladimír Brabec as King
- Daniel Hůlka as Brambas
- Sabina Laurinová as Princess Eufrozína
- Dana Morávková as Dora
- Lukáš Vaculík as Kujbaba
- Karel Gott as Lucifer and God
- Radoslav Brzobohatý as Markéta's father
- Milena Dvorská as Jan's Mother
