= Behold Homolka =

1970 film

- Directed by: Jaroslav Papoušek
- Written by: Jaroslav Papoušek
- Produced by: Rudolf Hájek
- Starring: Josef Šebánek; František Husák; Helena Růžičková
- Cinematography: Jozef Ort-Šnep
- Edited by: Jiřina Lukešová
- Music by: Karel Mareš
- Production company: Filmové studio Barrandov
- Distributed by: Ústřední půjčovna filmů
- Release date: 8 March 1970
- Running time: 85 minutes
- Country: Czechoslovakia
- Language: Czech

Behold Homolka (Czech: Ecce homo Homolka) is a Czech comedy film directed by Jaroslav Papoušek. It was released in 1970.

== Production ==
In the role of the grandfather Papoušek cast Josef Šebánek, with whom he already worked on Loves of a Blonde, Firemen's Ball and The Most Beautiful Age. In the roles of the twins he cast Miloš Forman's sons Petr and Matěj.

== Plot ==
The film follows a three generation family household in Prague.

== Cast ==
- Josef Šebánek as Grandfather
- Marie Motlová as Grandmother
- František Husák as Ludva
- Helena Růžičková as Heduš
- Petr Forman as Twin Péťa
- Matěj Forman as Twin Máťa
- Yvonne Kodonová as Pavlínka
- Miroslav Jelínek as Jirka
- Jiří Dědík as Man in car
- Růžena Pružinová as Neighbour
- Karel Fridrich as Man in window
