= Love Between the Raindrops =

1980 film

- Directed by: Karel Kachyňa
- Written by: Jan Otčenášek; Vladimír Kalina; Karel Kachyňa
- Starring: Lukáš Vaculík; Vladimír Menšík
- Cinematography: Jan Čuřík
- Edited by: Jiří Brožek
- Distributed by: Ústřední půjčovna filmů
- Release date: 1980
- Running time: 126 minutes
- Country: Czechoslovakia
- Language: Czech

Love Between the Raindrops (Czech: Lásky mezi kapkami deště) is a 1980 Czech drama film directed by Karel Kachyňa. The film was selected as the Czechoslovak entry for the Best Foreign Language Film at the 53rd Academy Awards, but was not accepted as a nominee.

== Cast ==
- Eduard Cupák as Narrator (voice)
- Vladimír Menšík as Vincenc Bursík
- Lukáš Vaculík as Kajda Bursík
- Michal Dlouhý as Young Kajda Bursík
- Jan Hrušínský as Pepan Bursík
- David Vlček as Young Pepan Bursík
- Zlata Adamovská as Věra Bursíková, Daughter
- Lucie Zedníčková as Young Věra Bursíková (as Lucie Bártová)
- Eva Jakoubková as Fanka Bursíková
- Tereza Pokorná as Pája
- Rudolf Hrušínský as Druggist
- Miroslav Macháček as Ráb, Druggist friend

== See also ==
- List of submissions to the 53rd Academy Awards for Best Foreign Language Film
- List of Czechoslovak submissions for the Academy Award for Best Foreign Language Film
