= Radůza =

Czech musician

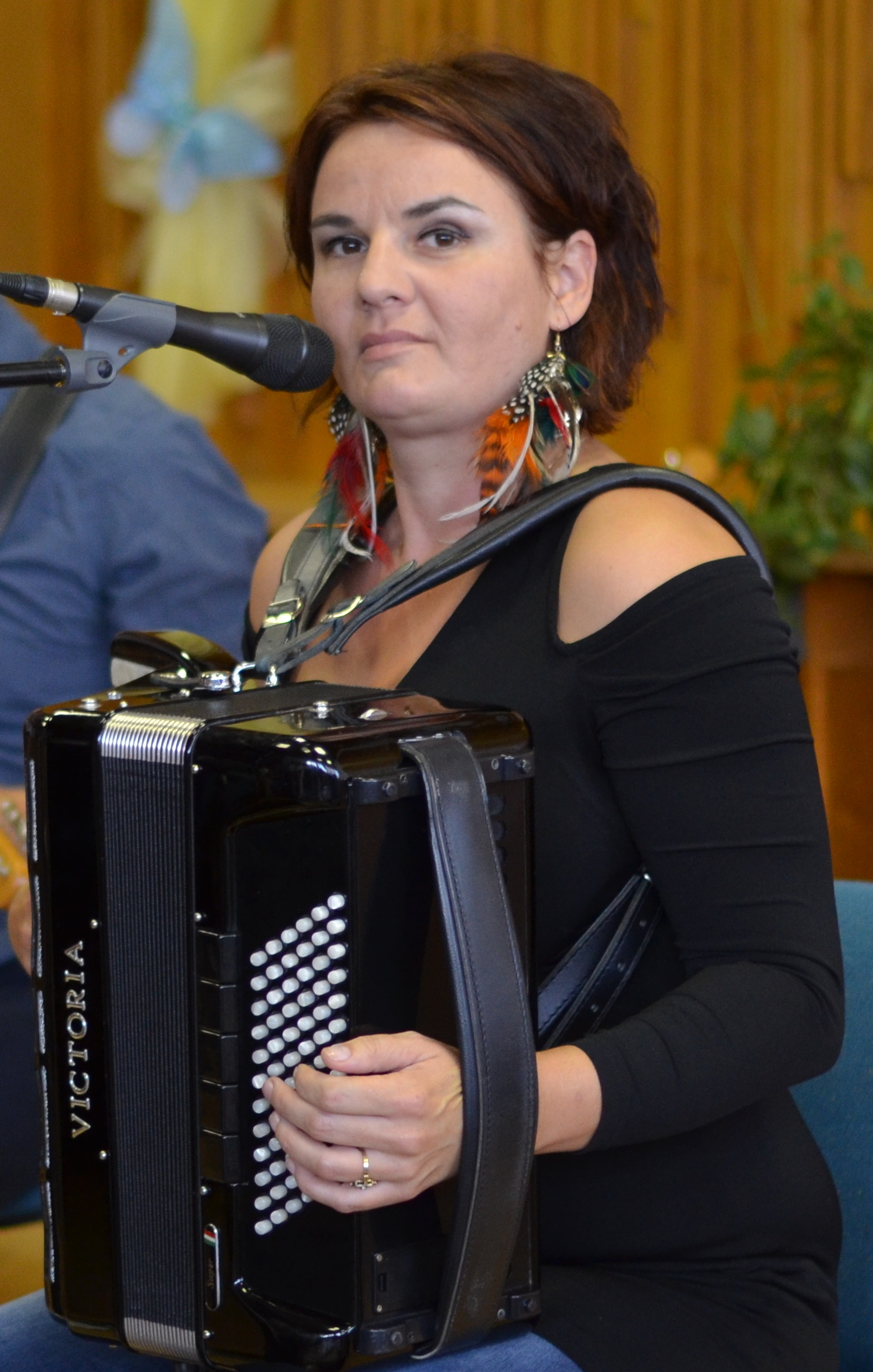
- Radůza (2016)

Background information
- Born: Radka Vranková; 16 March 1973 (age 53)
- Origin: Prague, Czechoslovakia
- Genres: Chanson, Folk
- Occupation: Singer
- Years active: 1994–present
- Label: Supraphon
- Website: raduza.cz

Radka Vranková (formerly Urbanová; born 16 March 1973), known by the stage name Radůza, is a Czech award-winning singer and accordionist. She won three awards at the 2003 Anděl Awards. Radůza studied at the Prague Conservatory, from which she graduated in 2001. She had a role in the 2006 film Beauty in Trouble. She gave birth to a son in 2007 and a daughter in 2009.

== Discography ==
=== Studio albums ===
- 2004: Andělové z nebe ("Angels from Heaven")
- 2004: ...při mně stůj ("...stand by me")
- 2005: V hoře ("In the Mountains")
- 2007: V salonu barokních dam ("In the Parlour of the Baroque Dames")
- 2007: Vše je jedním ("All is One")
- 2010: Miluju vás ("I Love You All")
- 2014: Gaia
- 2015: Marathon — příběh běžce ("Marathon — The Story of a Runner")
- 2017: Studna v poušti ("The Well in the Desert")
- 2018: Muž s bílým psem ("A Man with a White Dog")
- 2020: Kupředu plout ("To Float Onwards")
- 2022: Nebe je otevřené ("Heaven Is Opened")

== Awards and nominations ==
Year	Nominated work	Award	Category	Result	Ref
2003	Herself	Anděl Awards	Female Singer of the Year	Won	
