= Lukáš Vaculík (actor) =

Czech actor

- Born: 8 June 1962 (age 64); Prague, Czechoslovakia
- Occupation: Actor
- Years active: 1979–present
- Children: 2

Lukáš Vaculík (born 8 June 1962) is a Czech actor.

== Selected filmography ==
=== Film ===
- Love Between the Raindrops (1979)
- King Thrushbeard (1984)
- Tankový prapor (1991)
- Helluva Good Luck (1999)
- Helluva Good Luck 2 (2001)
- Jak básníci neztrácejí naději (2004)
- Příběh kmotra (2013)
- How Poets Wait for a Miracle (2016)
- Metanol (2018)

=== Television ===
- Strážce duší (2005–2009)
- Rapl (2016–2019)
- Temný kraj (2017–2019)
- The Defender (2021)
