= Jaroslav Papoušek =

Czech film director

- Born: 12 April 1929; Velký Bočkov, Czechoslovakia
- Died: 17 August 1995 (aged 66); Čimelice, Czech Republic
- Occupation(s): Film director Screenwriter; Sculptor

Jaroslav Papoušek (12 April 1929 – 16 July 1995) was a Czech film director and screenwriter. He started as a sculptor, before writing screenplays with Miloš Forman and Ivan Passer. In 1968 he started directing his own screenplays.

== Selected filmography ==
- Black Peter (1963) - screenwriter
- Intimate Lighting (1965) - screenwriter
- Loves of a Blonde (1965) - screenwriter
- The Firemen's Ball (1967) - screenwriter
- The Most Beautiful Age (1968) - director and screenwriter
- Behold Homolka (1969) - director and screenwriter
- Hogo Fogo Homolka (1970) - director and screenwriter
- Homolka and the Purse (1972) - director and screenwriter
- A Wife for Three Men (1979) - director and screenwriter
