= Renata Drössler =

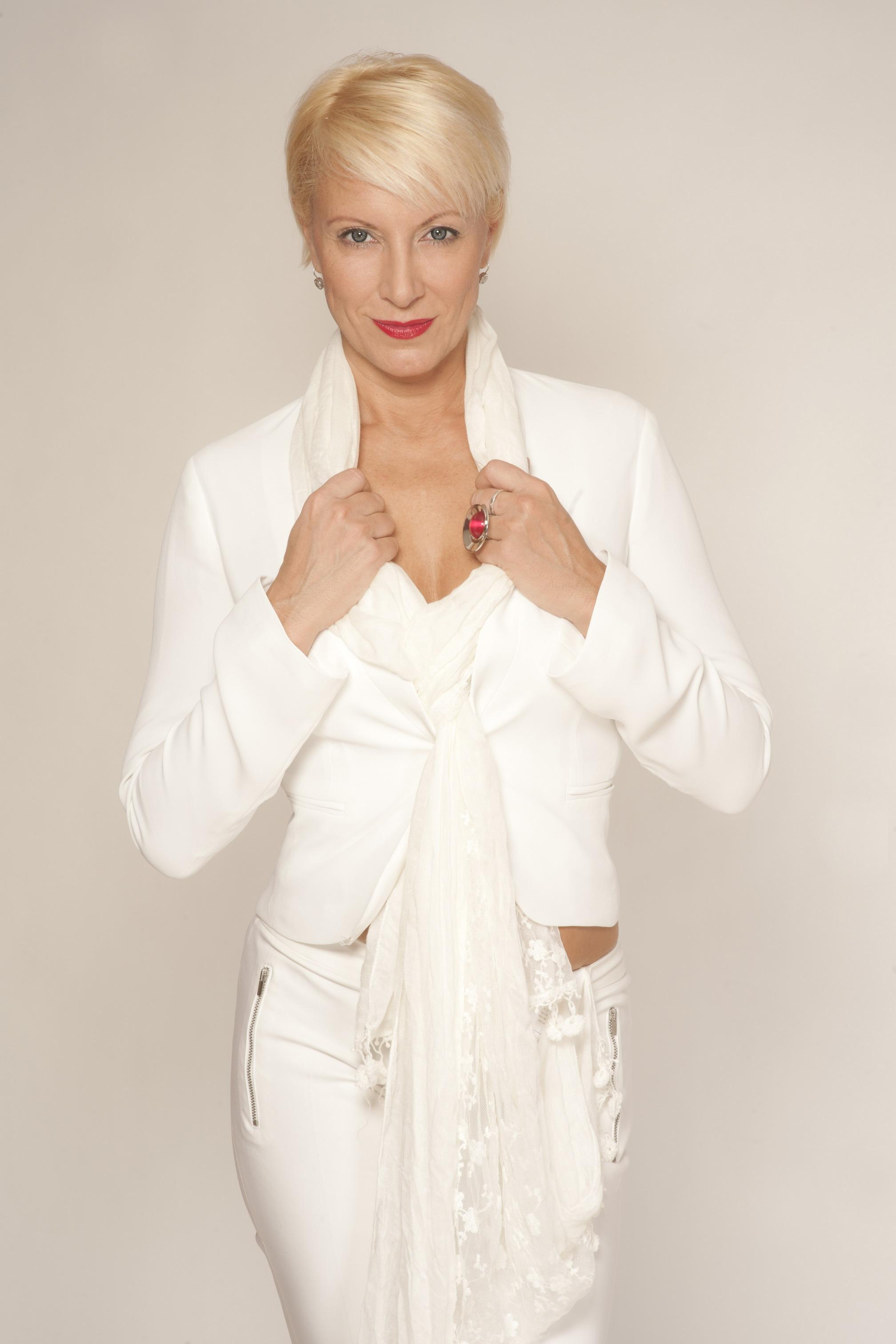

Background information
- Born: Renata Drőssler; 16 September 1963 (age 63); Třinec, Czechoslovakia
- Occupation: Singer
- Years active: 1990–present
- Website: renatadrossler.com

Renata Drössler (née Worek, born 16 September 1963) is a Czech pop singer and actress.

== Personal life ==
Drössler belongs to the Polish minority in the Czech Republic, having been born in the city of Třinec in the Trans-Olza region. She is an alumna of Juliusz Słowacki Polish Gymnasium.

== Career ==
Drössler is known particularly for her stage performances at Divadlo pod Palmovkou, which she joined in the late 1990s. Prior to her engagement at Pod Palmovkou, she spent six years at the Semafor theatre in Prague.

Drössler has recorded songs in 12 languages: Czech, Polish, Russian, German, Italian, French, English, Latin, Hungarian, Spanish, Hebrew and Yiddish.

== Selected filmography ==
- Válka barev (1993)
- Magda, její ztráty a nálezy (1996)
- Policajti z předměstí (television, 1999)
- Redakce (television, 2004)
- Nevinné lži (television, 2013)
