= Konojedy =

- Municipality
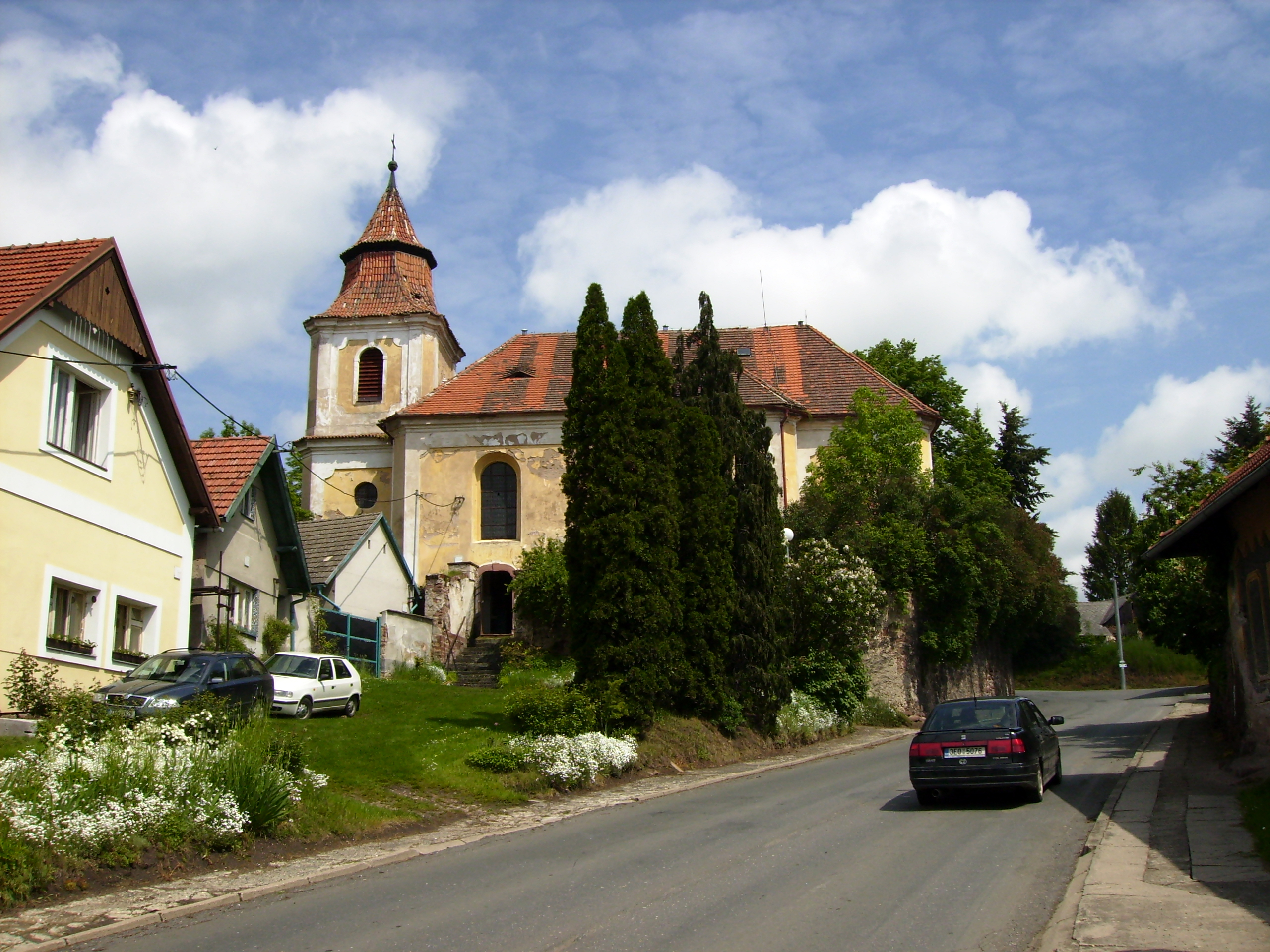
- Church of Saint Wenceslaus

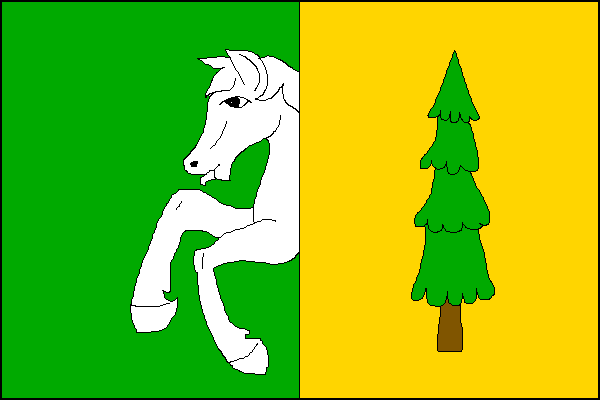
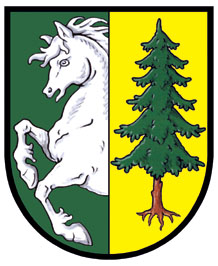
- Flag Coat of arms

- Location in the Czech Republic
- Coordinates: 49°56′55″N 14°51′5″E
- Country: Czech Republic
- Region: Central Bohemian
- District: Prague-East
- First mentioned: 1352

Area
  - Total: 5.13 km^{2} (1.98 sq mi)
- Elevation: 406 m (1,332 ft)

Population (2026-01-01)
  - Total: 290
  - Density: 57/km^{2} (150/sq mi)
- Time zone: UTC+1 (CET)
  - Summer (DST): UTC+2 (CEST)
- Postal code: 281 63
- Website: www.konojedy.cz

Konojedy is a municipality and village in Prague-East District in the Central Bohemian Region of the Czech Republic. It has about 300 inhabitants.

== Administrative division ==
Konojedy consists of two municipal parts (in brackets population according to the 2021 census):

- Konojedy (263)
- Klíče (11)

== History ==
The first written mention of Konojedy is from 1352.

== Demographics ==
Historical population
Year	Pop.	±%
1869	602	—
1880	604	+0.3%
1890	605	+0.2%
1900	570	−5.8%
1910	504	−11.6%
1921	461	−8.5%
1930	455	−1.3%
1950	297	−34.7%
1961	247	−16.8%
1970	203	−17.8%
1980	165	−18.7%
1991	148	−10.3%
2001	164	+10.8%
2011	247	+50.6%
2021	274	+10.9%
Source: Censuses
