= Pärnu methanol poisoning incident =

2001 methanol poisoning incident in Estonia

The Pärnu methanol poisoning incident (Estonian: Pärnu metanoolitragöödia) was a methanol poisoning incident in Pärnu county, Estonia in September 2001, caused by consumption of counterfeit vodka which had mistakenly been made with toxic methanol instead of ordinary ethanol. It led to the deaths of 68 people, very severe disability (including blindness or brain damage) to 40 people, and severe disability to three people.

On the night of 6 September 2001, 10 200-litre canisters of methanol, totalling 1.6 tonnes, were stolen from Baltfett (a company processing industrial fats, esters and animal feed) by Deniss Pletškin, a former employee and Robert Petrov, a current employee, on order of Sergei Maistrišin. To cover up the theft, Petrov later replaced the stolen canisters with empty ones. Maistrišin proceeded to sell the stolen methanol to Aleksandr Sobolev, a known smuggler, for 76,000 krooni, claiming that it was technical spirit (i.e., laboratory-grade neutral spirit). Sobolev mixed the liquid with water and lemon flavouring agents at about 30% by volume, bottled the resulting liquid, attached fake labels of various well-known vodka brands, and distributed it through an underground network. Beginning on 9 September, hundreds of people consumed the resulting product and suffered methanol poisoning.

Maistrišin was convicted and sentenced to five years of imprisonment, and Sobolev was sentenced to 2.5 years of imprisonment. Six other accomplices were given brief custodial sentences; about a dozen were sentenced to time served. The unexpectedly lenient sentencing aroused considerable discussion in Estonian public arena, and led to decline in underground alcohol sales.

== Sources ==
- Tiiu Põld: Eesti kohtueksperdid ja nende lahendatud lood (Estonian court experts and their stories resolved) (ISBN 978-9985-9918-1-7), Tartu 2008, pages 170–184
