= Pavel Vondruška =

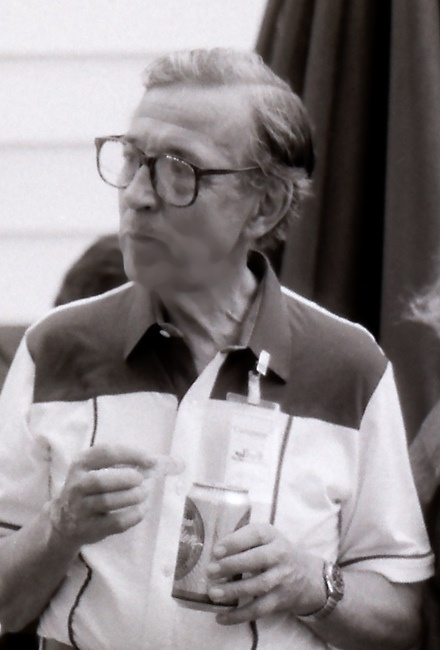
- Pavel Vondruška in 1995
- Born: 15 November 1925; České Budějovice, Czechoslovakia
- Died: 5 February 2011 (aged 85); Prague, Czech Republic
- Education: AMU
- Occupations: Conductor, actor
- Years active: 1968–2011

Pavel Vondruška (15 November 1925 – 5 February 2011) was a Czech actor and musician, and from 1969 was a member of the Jára Cimrman Theatre (named after Jára Cimrman, the spurious character) in Žižkov, Prague. His main profession was as a conductor. He also appeared in several films.

== Biography ==
He was born in České Budějovice, and mastered a number of foreign languages (French, Italian, Spanish, English, Russian, German, Croatian, Latin and Esperanto).

He studied at the conservatorium and consequently went on to study conducting, opera direction and dramaturgy at the music academy AMU, where he was taught by Karel Ančerl and Václav Talich. While studying, he was accompanist at the National Theatre Prague and conductor of the Prague Opera.

In the years 1951 to 1977 he was conductor at:

- AUSu Symphony Orchestra
- Moravian Philharmonic Olomouc
- State Theatre Opera Ostrava
- Opera of the Musical Theatre in Karlin (in the last year simultaneously accompanist at the National Theatre)

Between the years 1977 and 2009 he worked in the National Theatre, where he conducted the orchestra for the drama programme. From 1977 to 1998 he was also head of the theatre orchestra. He is known as an author and adapted music for some stagings (for example, Paličova dcera by Josef Kajetán Tyl). Sometimes he performed for the National Theatre as an actor in occasional roles. His activities at the National Theatre ended on 31 July 2009.

In the years 1969–2010 he was a member of the company at the Jára Cimrman Theatre – named after a non-existent playwright. He departed from this theatre due to his deteriorating memory. He was also involved with Divadlo Na Jezerce.

On 28 December 2010 he suffered a serious fall from the podium of the Estates Theatre while guiding tourists. He was hospitalised in the Motol Hospital and placed on life support. On the evening of 5 February 2011 he died in hospital in Prague.
