= Zdeněk Troška =

Czech film director and screenwriter (born 1953)

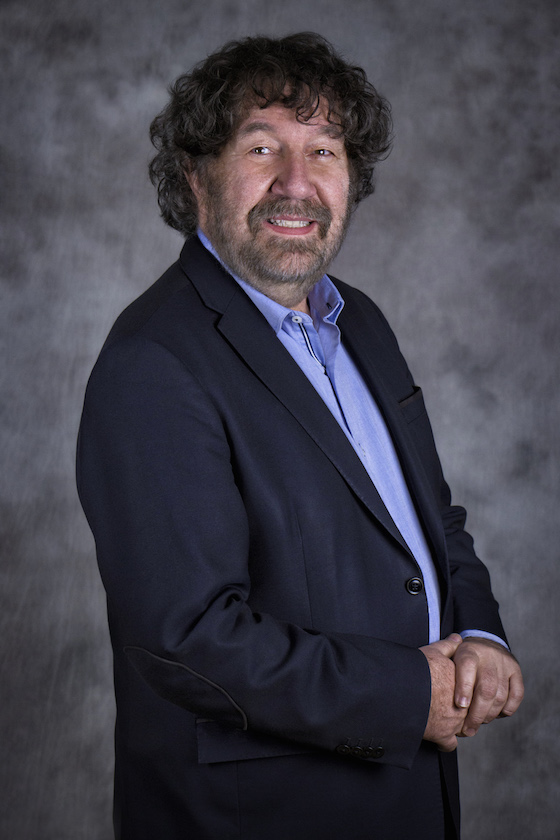
- Troška in 2017
- Born: 18 May 1953 (age 73); Strakonice, Czechoslovakia
- Education: Academy of Performing Arts in Prague, Lycée Carnot
- Occupations: Film director, screenwriter
- Years active: 1983–2019

Zdeněk Troška (born 18 May 1953) is a Czech film director and screenwriter. He mainly directed comedies and fairy-tale films.

== Personal life ==
Troška is deeply connected with the South Bohemian Region. He was born in the hospital in Strakonice, but he grew up in Hoštice, where he still lives and where he filmed several of his films (most notably the Slunce, seno... trilogy). He studied directing at Film and TV School of the Academy of Performing Arts in Prague and also at Lycée Carnot in Dijon, France. In 2006, Troška came out as gay.

== Work ==
Troška ranks among contradictory and sometimes controversial directors. Although he is educated and receives offers to direct classical operas and film dramas like Andělská tvář (2002), he is most famous for cheap comedies and fairy tales intended for an undemanding audience. His films are usually highly criticized by film critics, but they are successful and profitable in cinemas.

Troška made several fairy tale films, often following patterns where a young man ventures from a rural area to find love and defeat corrupt enemies. Films in this vein include Princess Jasnenka and the Flying Shoemaker, Princess from the Mill and its sequel, Helluva Good Luck and its sequel, and The Loveliest Riddle.

Among the comedies he has directed are Slunce, seno, jahody (1983), Slunce, seno a pár facek (1989), Slunce, seno, erotika (1991) and Doktor od jezera hrochů (2010).
