= Karel Havlíček (composer) =

Czech composer

- Havlíček in 2023

Background information
- Also known as: Karzi
- Born: 31 July 1974 (age 52); Prague, Czechoslovakia
- Occupations: Composer; pianist; multi-instrumentalist; music producer
- Instruments: Piano; keyboards
- Years active: 1996–present
- Website: www.karelhavlicek.com

Karel Havlíček (born 31 July 1974), also known by the pseudonym Karzi, is a Czech composer, pianist and music producer. His work includes film and television scores, advertising music and solo instrumental compositions. He was a member of the Czech indie rock band Southpaw before concentrating on screen composition. His screen credits include the films Ghoul, Němá tajemství and Bratři, as well as the television series Terapie, Mamon, Vzteklina and Profesor T. His score for Bratři was nominated for Best Music at the 2024 Czech Lion Awards.

== Biography ==
Havlíček was born in Prague in 1974 and has also worked under the name Karzi. In 1996, Havlíček co-founded the Prague indie rock band Southpaw with Jiří Burian. He worked as a keyboardist, composer, programmer and sound engineer. The group released several albums during the 2000s, including Pop Secret, Pleasure You Can Measure, Boys Make Noise and Heart Disk.

Southpaw ended its original run in 2011. The group returned in 2021 with the album I'm Really Gonna Miss These Songs When I'm Dead, on which Havlíček and Burian collaborated again.

After his work with Southpaw, Havlíček concentrated on composing and producing music for film and television. The National Film Archive records his work in several capacities, including composer, musician, producer and sound engineer. His film credits include the American documentary Lion Ark (2013), the horror film Ghoul (2015), Carpe Noctem (2022), Němá tajemství (2023) and Bratři (2023). His television work includes the Czech adaptation of the Israeli drama series Terapie and the series Mamon, Vzteklina, Profesor T and Polda.

Havlíček composed the music for Czech Television's news programming, including the news channel ČT24 and the main news programme Události. Czech Television reported on the news themes and identified him as their composer.

In 2023, Havlíček composed the scores for Němá tajemství and Bratři, both directed by Tomáš Mašín. Bratři, a historical drama concerning the Mašín brothers, received several nominations at the 2024 Czech Lion Awards. Havlíček's score was nominated in the Best Music category.

In addition to film and television scores, Havlíček has worked on advertising music and trailer soundtracks. His work includes music for the Penny Market Christmas 2018 advertising campaign, which became a finalist in the Film Craft – Direction category at the 2019 New York Festivals Advertising Awards.

In 2024, Havlíček composed music for the official trailer of the HBO series The Penguin. In 2026, he also worked on trailer music for ELLE, a television series associated with the Legally Blonde franchise.

Havlíček released the solo album Spoken in 2020. The instrumental recording combines piano, orchestral textures and electronic elements. In his review, music critic Jindřich Göth discussed the album's atmospheric arrangements and its relationship to the idea of a soundtrack for an imaginary film.

In October 2022, KlasikaPlus published a review of a concert based on Spoken. The review discussed the work's extended melodic lines, recurring musical patterns and dramatic development, as well as the integration of music with lighting and visual effects.

In 2023, Havlíček presented Electric Universe, an audiovisual concert project combining orchestral and electronic music. Czech Radio covered the project and interviewed him about the eight-hour musical event.

On 11 June 2025, Havlíček appeared with composer Vadim Petrov in a programme of their compositions at Czech Radio's Studio S1 in Prague, presented in association with the Prague Philharmonia. The concert was reviewed by OperaPlus, which discussed five of Havlíček's compositions and their combination of ambient, minimalist, melodic and electronic elements. KlasikaPlus also reviewed the concert in the context of contemporary music and its accessibility to audiences.

In 2025, Havlíček released the two-part project It's Never Late to See the Light, consisting of Part 1 and Part 2.

In March 2026, Havlíček was included on Moderna, a compilation released by Czech Radio Vltava documenting contemporary Czech neoclassical, modern classical, electroacoustic, ambient and film music.

Havlíček co-founded Kabelovna Studios in Prague with sound designer Vladimír Chorvatovič. The studio provides sound post-production, recording, mixing and music-production services for film, television and advertising.

He joined the PETROF Art Family in 2023, an artist community associated with the Czech piano manufacturer Petrof.

== Personal life ==
Havlíček's twin brother is the Czech-American painter Maxim Havlíček.

== Selected works ==
=== Film ===
- Lion Ark (2013)
- Ghoul (2015)
- Carpe Noctem (2022)
- Němá tajemství (2023)
- Bratři (2023)

=== Television ===
- Terapie
- Mamon (2015)
- Vzteklina (2018)
- Profesor T (2018)
- Polda

=== Solo discography ===
- Spoken (2020)
- It's Never Late to See the Light, Part 1 (2025)
- It's Never Late to See the Light, Part 2 (EP, 2025)

== Awards and nominations ==
Year	Award	Category	Work	Result
2015	International Movie Awards	Best Musical Score	Among the Shadows	Winner
2024	Czech Lion Awards	Best Music	Bratři	Nominated
2026	OSA Awards	Most Successful Popular-Music Author Abroad	—	Listed among three leading authors

=== Awards received by productions featuring Havlíček's music ===
Year	Award	Category	Production	Result
2016	Czech Lion Awards	Best Drama Television Series	Mamon	Won
2019	Czech Lion Awards	Best Drama Television Series	Profesor T	Nominated
2019	Czech Lion Awards	Best Drama Television Series	Vzteklina	Nominated
