= Karel Havlíček =

Karel Havlíček may refer to:

- Karel Havlíček (artist) (1907–1988), Czech artist
- Karel Havlíček (composer) (born 1974), Czech film composer and pianist, twin brother of Maxim Havlíček
- Karel Havlíček (politician) (born 1969), Czech politician
- Karel Havlíček Borovský (1821–1856), Czech author and journalist
