= Sněženky a machři =

- Directed by: Karel Smyczek
- Written by: Radek John; Ivo Pelant
- Starring: Václav Kopta; Michal Suchánek; Jan Antonín Duchoslav; Radoslav Brzobohatý; Veronika Freimanová; Eva Jeníčková; Valentina Thielová; Pavel Marek; Boris Halmi; Karel Kovář
- Edited by: Jiří Brožek
- Music by: Zdeněk John
- Distributed by: Ústřední půjčovna filmů
- Release date: March 1, 1983 (Czechoslovakia)
- Running time: 82 minutes
- Country: Czechoslovakia
- Language: Czech

Snowdrops and Aces (Czech: Sněženky a machři) is a 1983 Czech comedy film about a group of high school students learning to ski in the mountains. It was filmed with students from the Gymnázium Nad Štolou high school in Prague.

== See also ==
- Sněženky a machři po 25 letech, a 2008 sequel
