= Petra Pudová =

Czech singer and actress (born 1987)

Petra Pudova
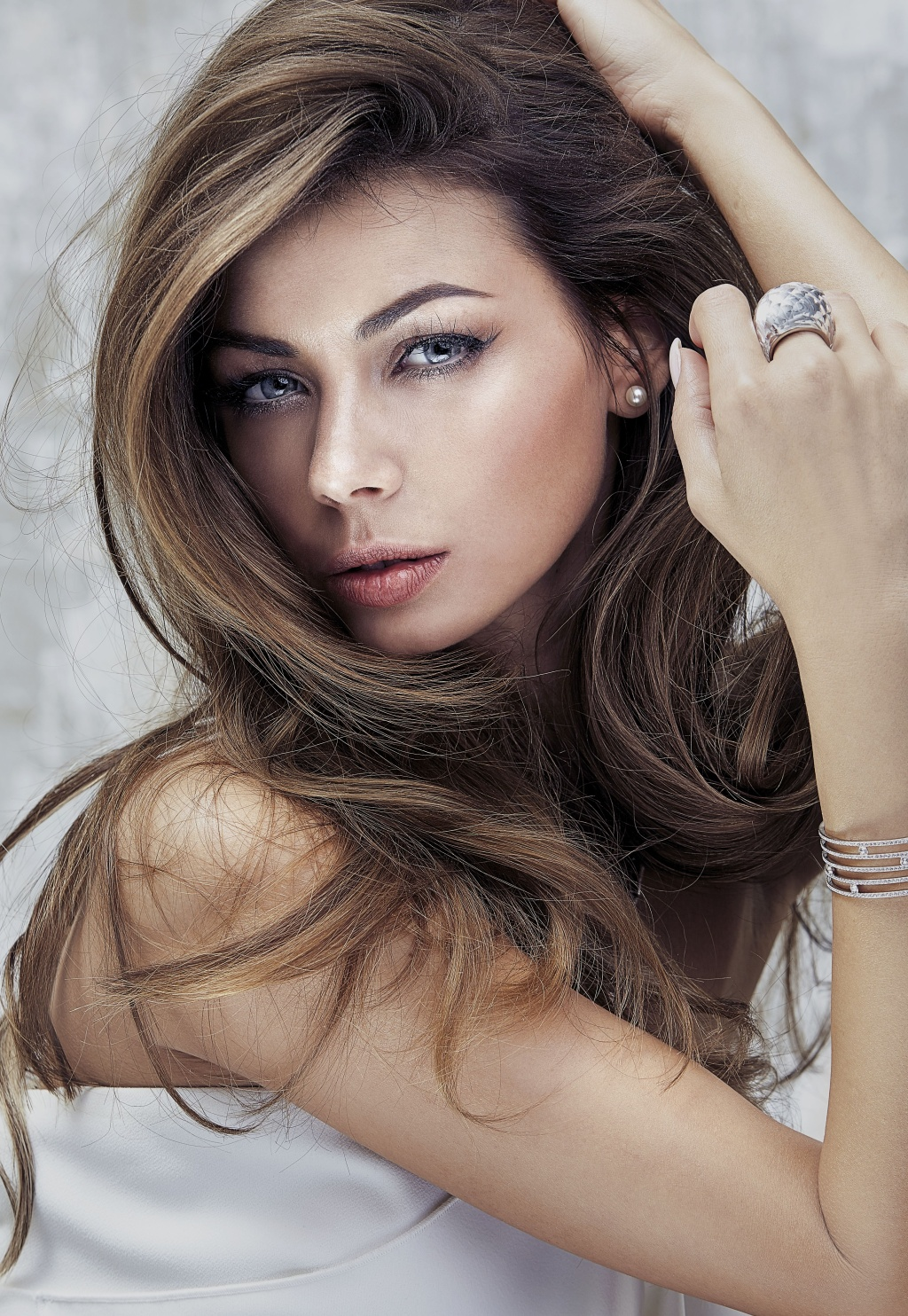
- Born: April 19, 1987 (age 39); Uničov, Czechoslovakia (now Czech Republic)
- Occupations: singer; actress; model
- Musical career
- Genres: pop
- Instrument: vocals
- Website: petrapudova.com

Petra Pudová (born 19 April 1987) is a Czech singer and actress. She has performed in films, television, and musicals. As a singer, she works with a band, though she spent 2016 developing her solo singing career. In April 2017 she released a single "One Last Time", and in June 2017 she released her first solo album Say it Out Loud.

== Discography ==
- 2017 Say it Out Loud

== Filmography ==
- 2006 Experti
- 2006 Prachy dělaj člověka
- 2007 Kdo hledá, najde
- 2008 Sněženky a machři po 25 letech
- 2008–2012 Ordinace v růžové zahradě 2 - Angelina Kodatová
- 2013 Cirkus Bukowsky

== Musicals and theatre roles ==
- 2005 The Secret – Anežka
- 2006 Dobře placená procházka
- 2007 Naháči – Anna
