= Rafťáci =

2006 Czech comedy film

- Directed by: Karel Janák
- Written by: Tomáš Holeček, Jan Prušinovský, Karel Janák, Rudolf Merkner
- Produced by: Adam Dvořák
- Starring: Vojtěch Kotek, Jiří Mádl
- Cinematography: Martin Šácha
- Edited by: Adam Dvořák
- Music by: Miroslav Chyška
- Distributed by: Falcon
- Release date: 22 March 2006
- Running time: 104 Minutes
- Country: Czech Republic
- Language: Czech
- Box office: 70,741,221 CZK

Rafťáci (lit. 'The Rafters') is a Czech comedy film directed by Karel Janák released in 2006.

== Cast ==
- Vojtěch Kotek as Dany
- Jiří Mádl as Filip
- Milan Šteindler as Dany's father
- Veronika Freimanová as Dany's mother
- Oldřich Navrátil as Borek
- Jan Antonín Duchoslav as Turek
- Pavla Tomicová as Filip's mother
- Jiřina Jirásková as Dany's granny
- Petr Čtvrtníček as Lifeguard
- Jiří Helekal as Grey wolf
- Pavel Nový as Firemen's chief
- Jiří Ployhar as Fireman Bouchac
- Boris Hybner as Therapist
- Matyáš Valenta as Honzík
- Andrea Kerestešová as Klára
