= Andrea Růžičková =

Slovak actress and model

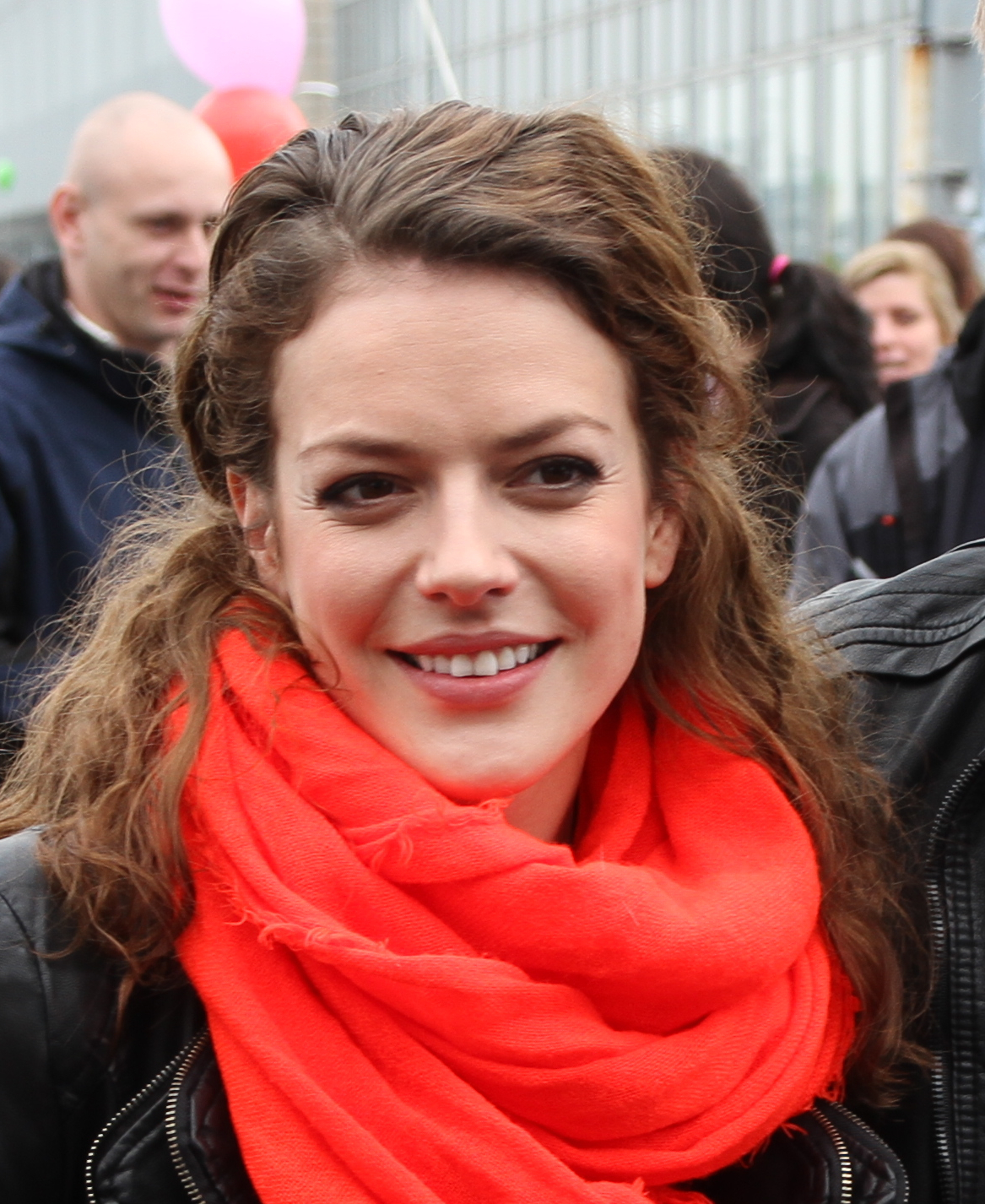
- Růžičková in 2013
- Born: Andrea Kerestešová; 21 July 1984 (age 40); Hlinné, Czechoslovakia (now Slovakia)
- Occupation: Actress
- Years active: 2004–present

Andrea Růžičková (née Kerestešová; born 21 July 1984) is a Slovak actress and model. She has starred in TV series including Světla pasáže and Vyprávěj, as well as the film Rafťáci.

Kerestešová married musician Mikoláš Růžička in 2016, adopting the surname Růžičková. She had a son in August 2017.

== Selected filmography ==
- Rafťáci (2006)
- Vyprávěj (television, 2010)
- Všiváci (2014)
