= Nightline (disambiguation) =

Nightline is an American late-night news program that airs on ABC.

Nightline may also refer to:

- Nightline (Australian TV program), a 1992–2010 Australian news bulletin television program which aired on Nine Network
- Nightline (New Zealand TV programme), a 1990–2013 New Zealand late-night news bulletin television programme that aired on TV3 network
- Nightline (student service), a confidential listening and information service run by university students for other university students
- Nightline, a courier delivery company based in Dublin, Ireland.
- Nightline (album), a 1983 album by Randy Crawford
- Nightline (film), a Czech film
- Nightline (radio), an entertainment program hosted on NBC Radio by Walter O'Keefe from 1957 to 1959.
- Nightline (Malaysian TV program), is Malaysian late-night news bulletin television programme that aired on TV3
