= Prachy dělaj člověka =

2006 Czech crime comedy film

- Directed by: Jiří Chlumský
- Written by: Radek John; Jan Kulhavý; Tomáš Hanák; Ondřej Vetchý
- Produced by: Jan Nejedlý
- Starring: Tomáš Hanák; Michal Suchánek; Ondřej Vetchý
- Cinematography: Tomáš Juríček; Ramúnas Greičius
- Edited by: Adam Dvořák
- Music by: Tomáš Bělohradský
- Distributed by: Bioscop
- Release date: 28 September 2006
- Running time: 90 minutes
- Country: Czech Republic
- Language: Czech
- Budget: 34.5 Million CZK
- Box office: 21 Million CZK

Prachy dělaj člověka (English: Money Makes the Man) is a Czech crime comedy film directed by Jiří Chlumský. It was released in 2006.

== Cast ==
- Tomáš Hanák
- Michal Suchánek
- Ondřej Vetchý
- Zdeněk Podhůrský
- Kateřina Průšová
- Tomáš Krejčíř
- Petra Pudová
- Tomáš Löbl
- Eva Decastelo
- Marek Taclík
- Marek Vašut
- Anna Šišková
- Jana Synková
- Martin Sitta
- Radim Fiala
- Petr Vágner
- Martin Havelka
- Renata Visnerová-Prokopová
- Robert Nebřenský
- Jiří Maria Sieber
- Gabriela Partyšová
