= The Night of the Emerald Moon =

1985 film

- Theatrical release poster
- Original title: Noc smaragdového měsíce
- Directed by: Václav Matějka
- Screenplay by: Václav Matějka; Jiří Křenek
- Starring: Radoslav Brzobohatý; Jerzy Trela; Pavol Višňovský
- Cinematography: Jiří Macháně
- Edited by: Josef Valušiak
- Music by: Jiří Svoboda
- Release dates: 25 February 1985 (Berlin IFF, limited); 1 August 1985 (Czech Republic, wide)
- Running time: 83 minutes
- Country: Czechoslovakia
- Language: Czech

The Night of the Emerald Moon (Czech: Noc smaragdového měsíce) is a 1985 Czech drama film directed by Václav Matějka. It was entered into the 35th Berlin International Film Festival.

== Cast ==
- Radoslav Brzobohatý as Janek Kysucan
- Jerzy Trela as Cyril Kysucan
- Pavol Višňovský as Vojta Kysucan
- Božidara Turzonovová as Marie, Cyril's spouse
- Magdaléna Vášáryová (credited as Magda Vašáryová) as Slávka
- Pavel Nový as Perleťák
- Rudolf Hrušínský as Oskar
- Zlata Adamovská as Young mother
- Věra Kubánková as Old mother
- Yvetta Blanarovičová as Gipsy woman
- Milena Dvorská as Jarmila
- Pavel Kříž as Honza
