= Angel in a Devil's Body =

- Theatrical release poster
- Original title: Anděl s ďáblem v těle
- Directed by: Václav Matějka
- Written by: Drahoslav Makovička; Václav Matějka
- Starring: Zdena Studenková
- Cinematography: Jiří Macháně
- Edited by: Josef Valušiak
- Release date: 1984
- Running time: 99 minutes
- Country: Czechoslovakia
- Language: Czech

Angel in a Devil's Body (Czech: Anděl s ďáblem v těle) is a Czech comedy film directed by Václav Matějka. It was released in 1983.

== Cast ==
- Zdena Studenková - Renáta
- Božidara Turzonovová - Madam
- Karel Heřmánek - Bulis
- Miloš Kopecký - Boura
- Radoslav Brzobohatý - Sulc
- Josef Vinklář - Nikodým
- Jiří Korn - Artur
- Josef Větrovec - First
- Jan Hartl - Justic
