= Night Riders (1981 film) =

- Directed by: Martin Hollý
- Screenplay by: Tibor Vichta
- Starring: Radoslav Brzobohatý; Michal Dočolomanský; Soňa Valentová; Leopold Haverl
- Cinematography: František Uldrich
- Production companies: Barrandov Studios; Slovenská filmová tvorba Koliba (SFT)
- Release date: 1981
- Running time: 88 min.
- Languages: Slovak; Czech

Night Riders (Slovak: Noční jazdci or Czech: Noční jezdci) is a 1981 Czechoslovak film.

== Cast ==
- Radoslav Brzobohatý as Halva
- Michal Dočolomanský as Marek Orban
- Leopold Haverl as Babušek
- Jozef Adamovič as Imro Jakuvec
- Karol Čálik as Paľo Šebo-Macúch

== Synopsis ==
Shortly after World War I and the creation of the First Czechoslovak Republic, two war veterans are confronted in a small village in the north of Slovakia bordering Poland. The village is home to one of the veterans, Marek Orban (Michal Dočolomanský). As it is isolated and lacks job opportunities, he persuades the inhabitants to emigrate to America. The villagers have to sell all the cattle to be able to buy the boat tickets, but it still is not enough. Marek Orban has to smuggle horses to Poland.

The other veteran, customs officer Halva (Radoslav Brzobohatý), arrives from Prague to protect the borders and the law of the new republic. Both men of honor and principle, they are led to conflict which results in a death of villagers and customs officers. The absurdity of this tragedy is underlined at the end of the film when the border is moved, the village becomes a part of Poland and in the background Marek Orban can be seen smuggling horses from Poland to Poland.
