= Mstitel =

1959 film

- Directed by: Karel Steklý
- Written by: Karel Matěj Čapek-Chod; Karel Steklý
- Starring: Radoslav Brzobohatý
- Edited by: Jan Kohout; Jarmila Müllerová
- Release date: 1959
- Running time: 84 minutes
- Country: Czechoslovakia
- Language: Czech

Mstitel is a 1959 Czechoslovak drama film directed by Karel Steklý.

== Cast ==
- Radoslav Brzobohatý as Len
- Ivanka Devátá as Marynka
- Jan Pivec as Konopik
- Libuše Řídelová as Kabourková
- Josef Beyvl as Cverenc
- Gustav Nezval as Zedník krystof
