= Braňo Holiček =

Slovak actor and musician (born 1985)

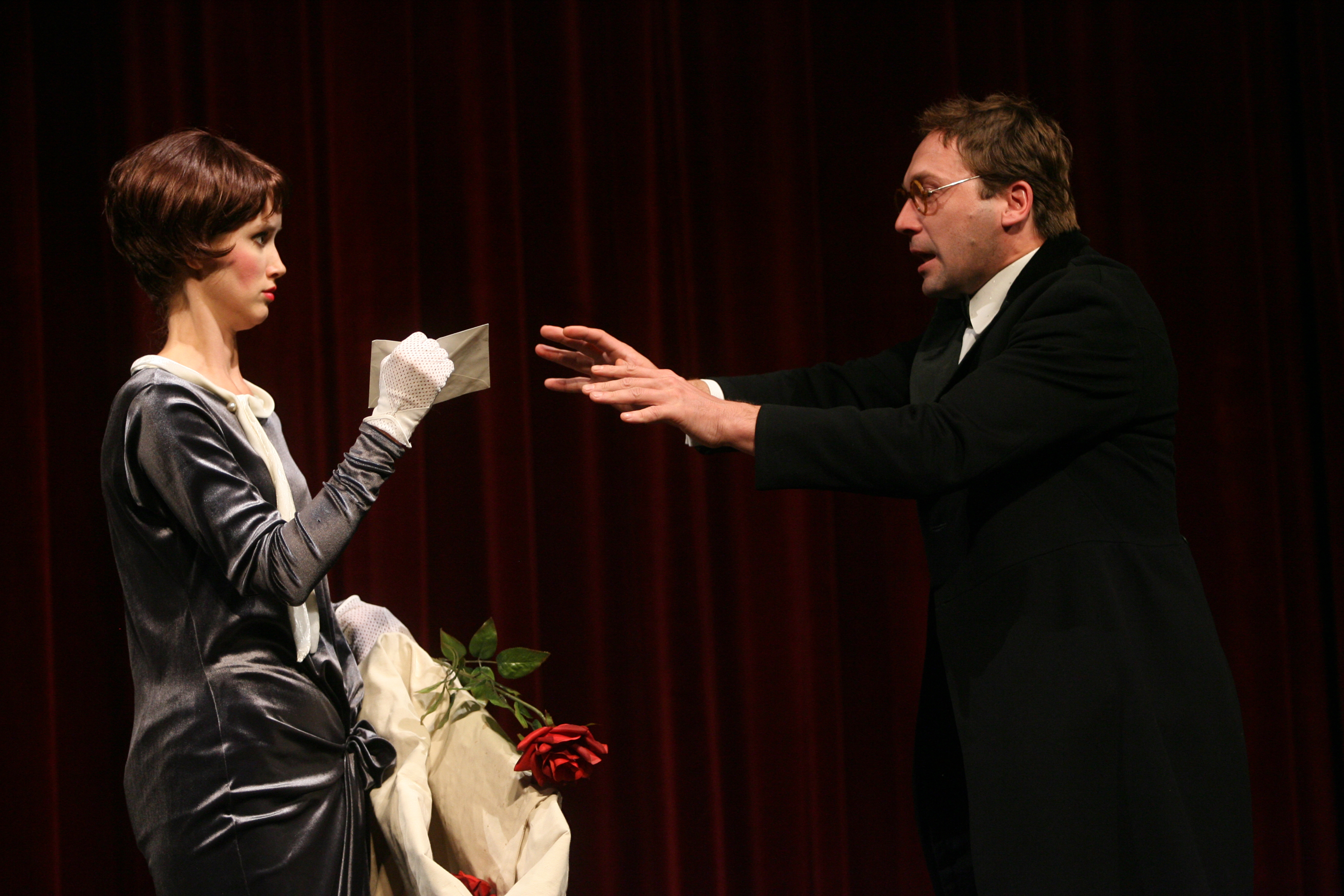
- Holíček in 2008
- Born: Branislav Holiček; 14 August 1985 (age 40); Košice, Czechoslovakia
- Occupation: Actor
- Spouse: Vendula Holíčková
- Children: 3

Braňo Holiček (born 14 August 1985) is a Slovak actor, director and musician.

== Biography ==
=== Early life ===
Braňo Holiček was born on 14 August 1985 in Košice. His parents recognised his talent already at an early age, and enrolled him in a school specializing in the arts. He performed in kids' talent programs on television, including Asterisk and Golden Gate. His first big breakthrough was in 1997, when he was chosen to play the lead in the national Slovak production of Oliver! at the age of 12. He retained the role for a year and half. Afterwards, he also performed the title role in Janko Hraško under Ján Ďurovčík.

On 1 June 1998 he released his debut album on PolyGram. He also appeared on the soundtrack of the musical Fontána pre Zuzanu III ("A Fountain for Susan III").

He went on to appear in minor roles in TV movies, before playing the main role in the movie Thomas the Falconer at the age of 14. He is also well known in Slovakia for his voice-over work. He also had a role in Za mestskými múrmi: Kováč Juraj.

Holiček attended the Prague Conservatory and studied theatre directing at the Academy of Performing Arts in Prague. After graduation, Holiček became a director at the alternative theatre Studio Ypsilon in Prague, where he remained until 2019. He also directed several plays for the National Theatre Brno, F.X. Šalda Theatre in Liberec and the Minor theatre in Prague.

In addition to directing, Holiček continued to act predominantly in Czech television series, including Vyprávěj and Ordinace v růžové zahradě. Nonetheless, he found acting to stressful and by the mid 2010s, decided to focus exclusively on directing.

== Personal life ==
Holiček married Vendula Holičeková, a theatre actress. Together they have a son named Hugo and twin daughters Dorota and Žofinka.

== See also ==
- The 100 Greatest Slovak Albums of All Time
