= Together (2022 film) =

- Czech poster
- Czech: Spolu
- Directed by: David Laňka, Martin Müller
- Written by: David Laňka, Martin Müller
- Based on: Ensemble by Fabio Marra
- Starring: Štěpán Kozub; Veronika Žilková; Kamila Janovičová
- Cinematography: Václav Tlapák
- Edited by: Lenka Gmitrová
- Music by: Sven Mikkelsen
- Distributed by: Bontonfilm
- Release date: 29 September 2022 (Czech Republic)
- Running time: 117 minutes
- Country: Czech Republic
- Language: Czech

Together (Czech: Spolu) is a 2022 Czech psychological drama film starring Štěpán Kozub. It is a film adaptation of a psychological drama about life with autism; it is based on a play by the Italian actor and playwright Fabio Marra. It was written and directed by David Laňka and Martin Müller. The film was presented on July 7, 2022, at the 56th Karlovy Vary International Film Festival.

== Cast ==
- Štěpán Kozub as Michal
- Veronika Žilková as Ivana
- Kamila Janovičová as Tereza
- Marek Němec as Marek
- Kristýna Podzimková as a nurse
- Martina Babišová as a miss
- Václav Kopta as Špaček
- Marianna Polyaková
