= Vyprávěj =

Czech television series

- Genre: Historical, Drama
- Directed by: Biser Arichtev
- Country of origin: Czech Republic
- Original languages: Czech; Slovak
- No. of seasons: 6
- No. of episodes: 115

Production
- Running time: 52 minutes

Original release
- Network: Czech Television
- Release: 2009 – 2013

Wonderful Times (Czech: Vyprávěj, literally Narrate) is a Czech retro television series. It was produced by Dramedy Productions, whose producers Filip Bobiňski and Petr Šizling created the series with screenwriter Rudolf Merkner. The plot takes place in Czechoslovakia (later in the Czech Republic) and is set in real historical events that influence the stories of individual characters. Authors wanted to evoke atmosphere of the time with excerpts from Czechoslovak film weeklies of the time with original comments, by new historicizing commentary narrated by Vladimír Fišer, or by period music. The story is accompanied by the voice of the narrator, who was lent to the project by the actor Vojtěch Kotek and then by Matěj Hádek. The series was a large success and is considered one of the most successful projects of Czech Television.

== Plot ==
The plot is told by Honza Dvořák, who is trying to record the history of his family, based on the stories of his parents and grandparents.

The opening scene takes place in the present, at the wedding of Honza and Lucie – the daughter of Honza's father Karel's lifelong enemy – Jarda Franc. The plot of the series is gradually moving towards this wedding again.

== Cast ==
- Nina Divíšková as Alžběta Dvořáková
- Radoslav Brzobohatý as František Kopecký
- Svatopluk Skopal as Josef Dvořák
- Veronika Freimanová as Jana Dvořáková
- Roman Vojtek as Karel Dvořák
- Andrea Kerestešová as Eva Dvořáková née Martináková
- Štěpán Tesáček/Jakub Pozler/Oliver Sieber/Marián Mikš/Zdeněk Piškula/Jiří Novák/Braňo Holiček/Matěj Hádek as Jan "Honza" Dvořák
- Jakub Sehnalík/Filip Antonio/Štěpán Krtička/Štěpán Benoni as Matěj Dvořák
- Jaromír Nosek as Antonín Sova ml.
- Andrea Nováková/Hana Vagnerová as Zuzana Sovová née Dvořáková
- Kateřina Císařovská/Anastázie Chocholatá/Lucie Šteflová as Magdalena Sovová
- Ondřej Veselý as Jarda Franc
- Alžbeta Stanková as Veronika Francová
- Petr Pěknic as Dan Kolář
- David Prachař as Radim Dvořák
- Mahulena Bočanová as Milada Dvořáková
- Lenka Zahradnická as Renata Dvořáková
- Martin Zounar as Oto Slaný AKA Slaňoch
- Oldřich Hajlich as Roman Dvořák
- Eva Zubíčková as Marika Dvořáková née Růžičková
- František Šmirous / Matěj Švehla as Viktor Dvořák
- Pavel Trávníček as Mikuláš Dvořák
- Johana Munzarová as Hilda Dvořáková
- Lenka Ouhrabková as Julie
- Judita Jansman as Anna
- Dana Syslová as Marie Sovová
- Oldřich Vlach as Antonín Sova senior
- Marián Labuda as Janko Martinák
- Marta Sladečková as Maria Martináková
- Zuzana Čapková as Jana Oplatková née Martináková
- Ladislav Hampl as Marek Oplatka
- Milena Minichová as Katarína Kupsová née Martináková
- Josef Polášek as Hynek Kupsa

== Episodes ==
Season	Episodes	Originally aired	
Season	Episodes	First aired	Last aired
1	26	31 August 2009	22 February 2010
2	16	3 September 2010	17 December 2010
3	26	9 September 2011	23 March 2012
Osudy (Fates)	9	30 March 2012	25 May 2012
4	16	7 September 2012	11 January 2013
5	22	18 January 2013	14 June 2013
