= Sněženky a machři po 25 letech =

- Directed by: Viktor Tauš
- Written by: Radek John, Ivo Pelant
- Produced by: Michal Kollár, Jaroslav Nietsch, Jiří Jurtin, Dana Voláková
- Starring: Jan Antonín Duchoslav; Michal Suchánek; Eva Jeníčková; Václav Kopta; Veronika Freimanová; Radoslav Brzobohatý
- Cinematography: Milan Chadima
- Edited by: Michal Kollár, Maroš Šlapeta
- Music by: Walter Kraft
- Release date: 2008
- Running time: 100 minutes
- Countries: Czech Republic, Slovakia
- Language: Czech

Sněženky a machři po 25 letech is a Czech comedy film. It was released in 2008.

== Cast ==
- Jan Antonín Duchoslav
- Michal Suchánek
- Eva Jeníčková
- Václav Kopta
- Veronika Freimanová
- Radoslav Brzobohatý
- Juliana Johanidesová
- Richard Genzer
- Kateřina Neumannová
- Peter Hosking as Robert
