= Richard Genzer =

Czech actor and dancer

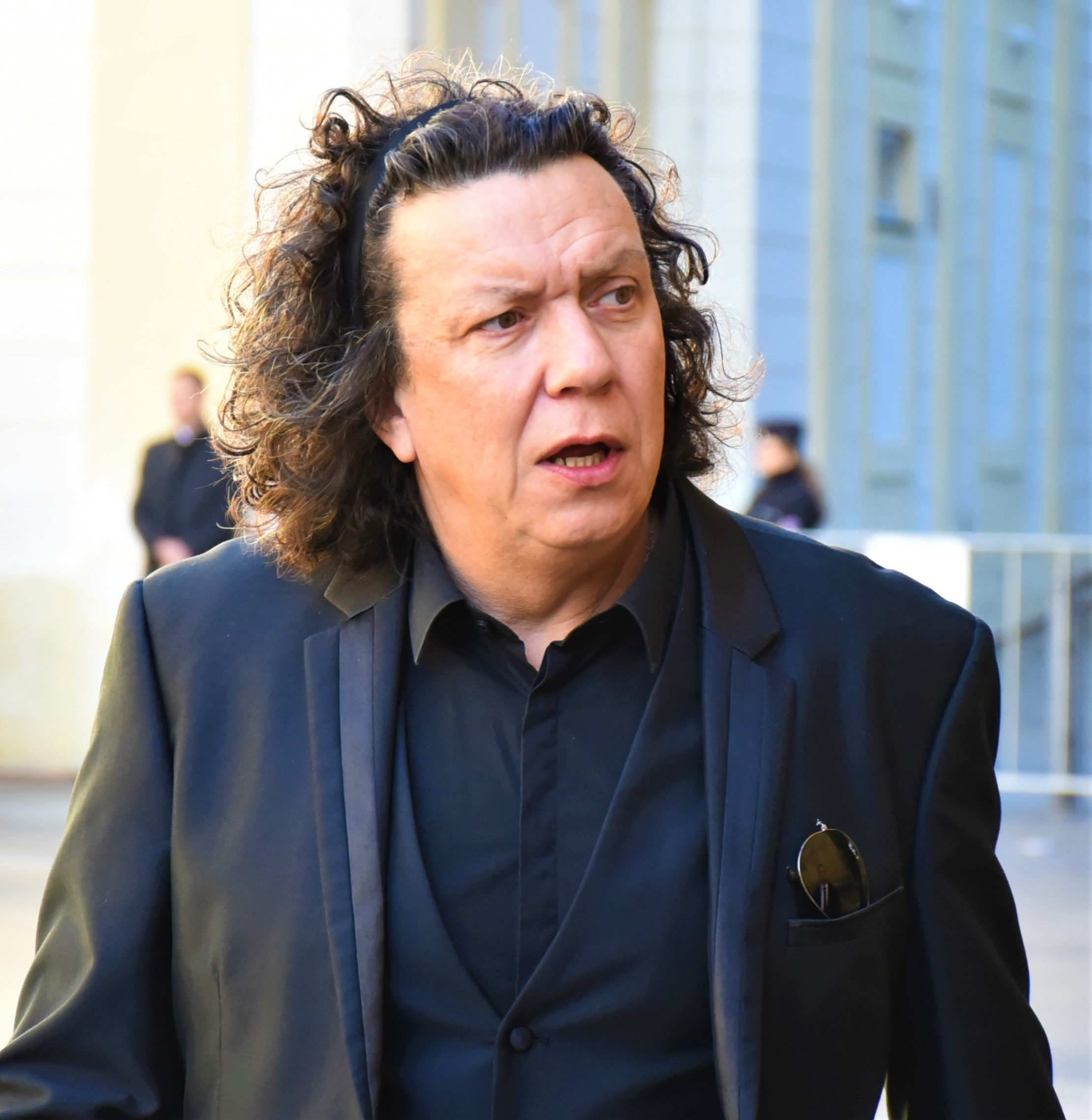
- Richard Genzer
- Born: 20 December 1966 (age 59); Prague, Czechoslovakia
- Occupations: Actor, Comedian, Dancer
- Years active: 1988-present

Richard Genzer (born 20 December 1966) is a Czech actor, dancer, singer, TV host and comedian.

He was born in Prague. His father wanted him to be an association football player, however, he attended and graduated from the Dance Conservatory in Prague, where he met and befriended his later colleague, Michal Suchánek.

== Television and film career ==
After his studies he started working as a dancer in the group UNO, and subsequently began to appear in musicals. The most successful were Krysař (Pied Piper), West Side Story and Dracula. In 2000, along with Michal Suchánek, Josef Carda and Veronika Žilková, he performed on TV Nova's show Tele Tele. He continued to work with Michal Suchánek on the show MR. GS.

He appeared in several films, including Kameňák 2's third sequel, Sněženky a machři po 25 letech (Snowdrops and Aces after 25 years) and Láska za milion (Love in a million).

Currently, he appears on TV Prima creating the improvisational show Partička (Bunch) together with Michal Suchánek, Ondřej Sokol and Igor Chmela.

== Personal life ==
He was married to singer Linda Finková, with whom he has a daughter and a son.

== Filmography ==
=== Films ===
- 2004 – Kameňák 2
- 2005 – Kameňák 3
- 2008 – Sněženky a machři po 25 letech
- 2009 – Láska za milion
- 2016 – Pat a Mat ve filmu

=== Television films ===
- 1990 – Takmer ružový príbeh

=== Serials ===
- 2000 – Pra pra pra

Tele-Tele Mr.GS

=== Improvisational show ===
- 2011, 2012 – Partička
