= Igor Bareš =

Czech actor (born 1966)

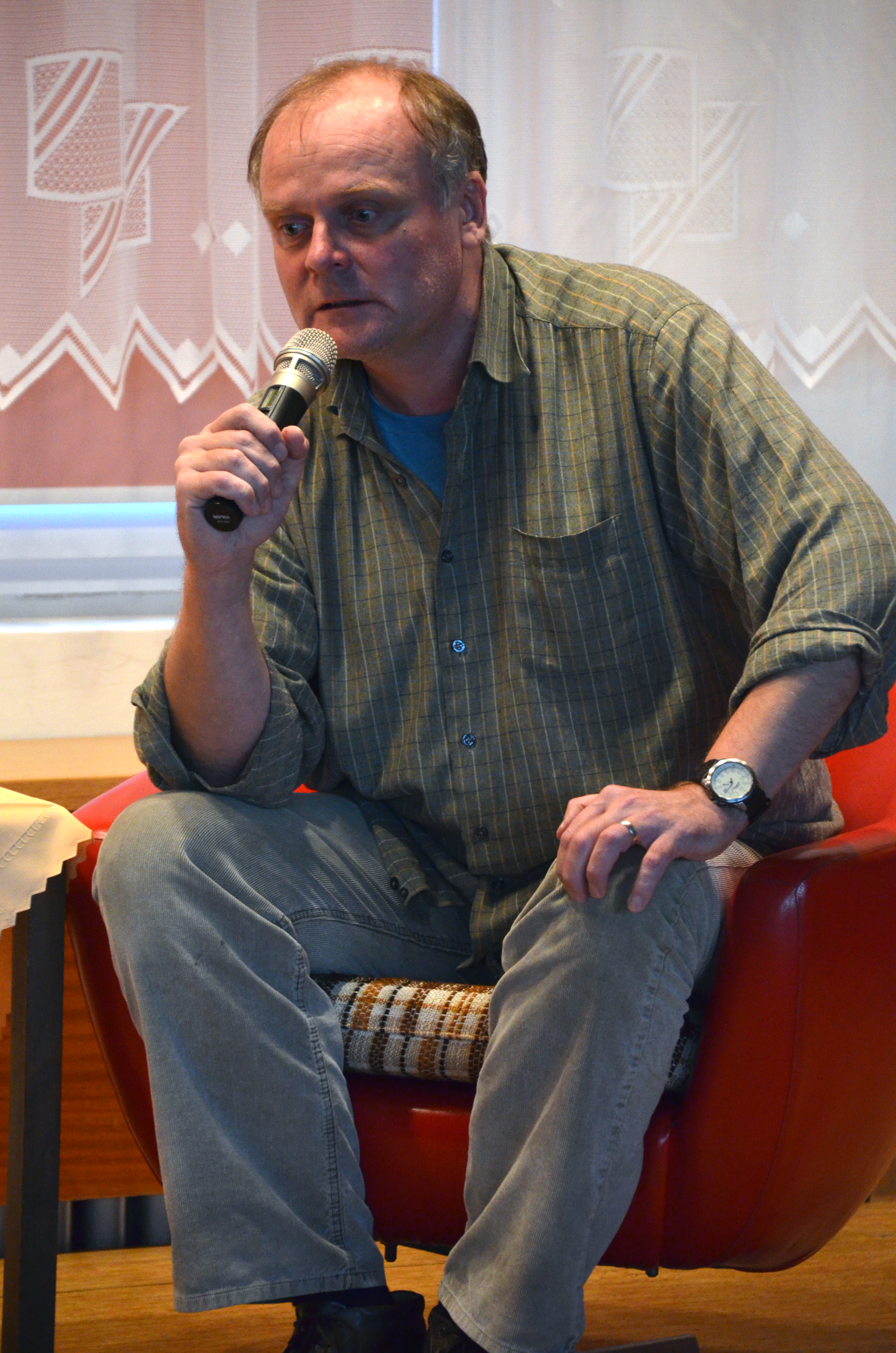
- Born: 15 April 1966 (age 60); Olomouc, Czechoslovakia
- Occupation: Actor
- Years active: 1989–present
- Spouse: Antonie Talacková
- Children: 3

Igor Bareš (born 15 April 1966) is a Czech actor.

== Selected filmography ==
=== Film ===
- The City of the Sun (2005)
- Pleasant Moments (2006)
- An Earthly Paradise for the Eyes (2009)
- Men in Rut (2009)
- Největší z Čechů (2010)
- Seven Days of Sin (2012)
- Můj vysvlečenej deník (2012)
- Nightline (2022)
- Waves (2024)

=== Television ===
- Czech Century (2013)
- Burning Bush (2013)
- Případy 1. oddělení (2014)
- Mamon (2015)
- Vzteklina (2018)
- Četníci z Luhačovic (2017)

=== Play ===
- Naši furianti
