= Přísně tajné premiéry =

1967 film

- Directed by: Martin Frič
- Written by: František Daniel; Zdenek Dufek; Vilém Hejl; Martin Frič
- Produced by: Ladislav Ters
- Starring: Jiřina Bohdalová
- Cinematography: Jirí Tarantík
- Edited by: Jan Kohout
- Release date: 1967
- Running time: 86 minutes
- Country: Czechoslovakia
- Language: Czech

Přísně tajné premiéry is a 1967 Czech comedy film directed by Martin Frič.

== Cast ==
- Jiřina Bohdalová as Lida
- Lubomír Kostelka
- Jiří Sovák as Hudec
- Čestmír Řanda as Jech
- Vladimír Menšík as Matysek
- Jiří Němeček as Klikac
- Miloš Kopecký as Müller
