= Michal Dočolomanský =

Slovak actor and singer (1942–2008)

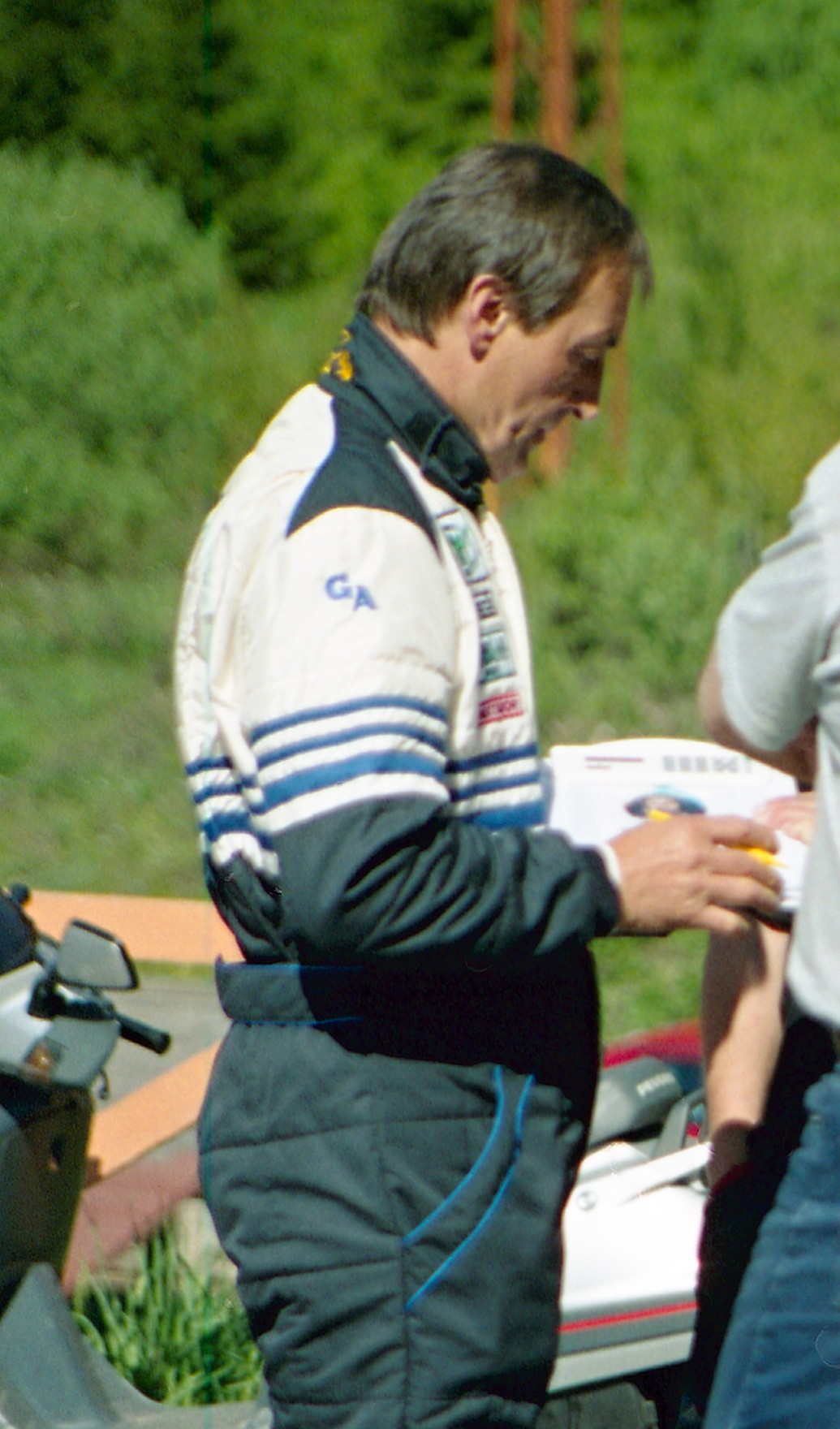
- Michal Dočolomanský as racing car driver.
- Born: 25 March 1942; Niedzica, Slovakia
- Died: 26 August 2008 (aged 66); Bratislava, Slovakia
- Occupations: Actor, singer
- Years active: 1962–2007

Signature
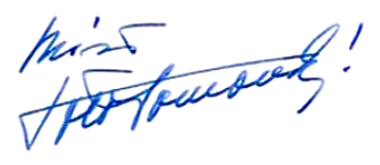

Michal Dočolomanský (25 March 1942 in Niedzica – 26 August 2008 in Bratislava) was a Slovak actor and singer. He appeared in more than forty films between 1962 and 2007.

== Filmography ==
Film
Year	Title	Role	Notes
1977	Dinner for Adele		
1981	Night Riders		
1981	The Mysterious Castle in the Carpathians		
1983	Tisícročná včela		
