= Václav Matějka =

Czech film director

- Born: 4 July 1937 (age 88); Katovice, Czechoslovakia
- Occupations: Film director, screenwriter
- Years active: 1970–1989

Václav Matějka (born 4 July 1937) is a Czech film director and screenwriter. He directed 15 films between 1970 and 1989. His 1985 film Noc smaragdového měsíce was entered into the 35th Berlin International Film Festival.

== Selected filmography ==
- Anděl s ďáblem v těle (1983)
- Noc smaragdového měsíce (1985)
