= A Leap in the Dark (1964 film) =

1964 Czech war film

- Directed by: Vladislav Delong
- Written by: Vladislav Delong, Otto Zelenka
- Produced by: Eliška Nejedlá
- Starring: Martin Růžek, Jaroslav Mareš, Radoslav Brzobohatý
- Cinematography: Jan Kališ
- Edited by: Antonín Zelenka
- Release date: 28 August 1964
- Running time: 92 minutes
- Country: Czechoslovakia
- Languages: Czech; German

A Leap in the Dark (Czech title: Skok do tmy) is a 1964 black-and-white Czechoslovak war film directed by Vladislav Delong. The film is about three paratroopers sent from Moscow to Protectorate of Bohemia and Moravia to establish contact with local resistance.

== Cast ==
- Martin Růžek as Štěpán Hradecký
- Jaroslav Mareš as Karel Vrána
- Radoslav Brzobohatý as Honza
- Miroslav Macháček as Eda Hertl
- Václav Voska as MUDr. Gruber
- Květoslava Houdlová as Hertl's wife
- Marie Tomášová as Zdena
- Vlastimil Hašek as Petr Vosecký
