= Katovice =

- Market town
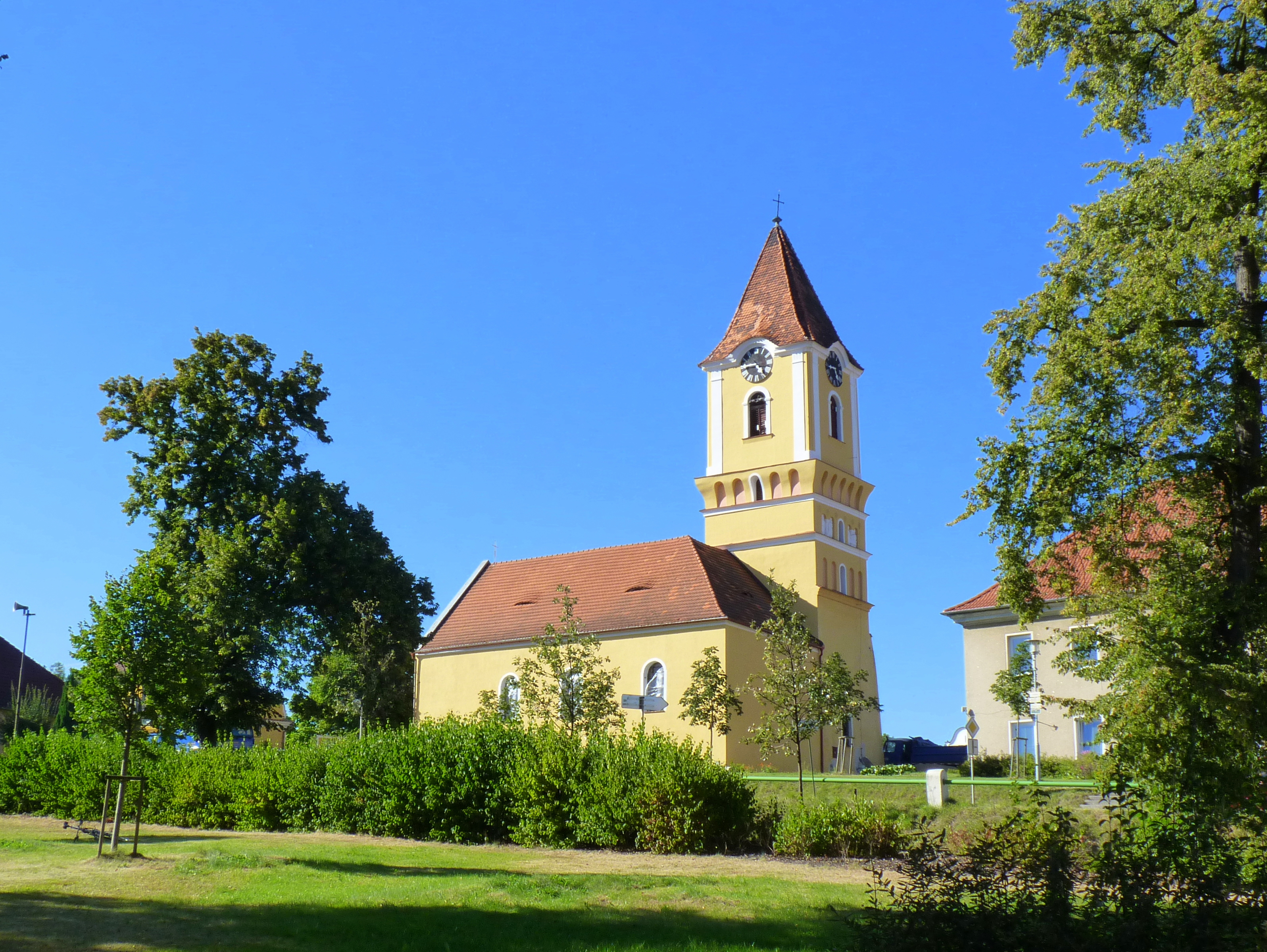
- Church of Saints Philip and James

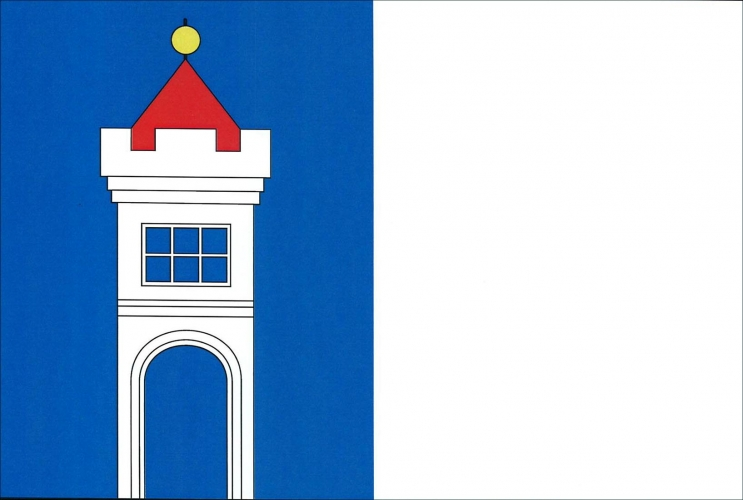
- Flag Coat of arms

- Location in the Czech Republic
- Coordinates: 49°16′25″N 13°49′49″E
- Country: Czech Republic
- Region: South Bohemian
- District: Strakonice
- First mentioned: 1045

Area
  - Total: 9.58 km^{2} (3.70 sq mi)
- Elevation: 412 m (1,352 ft)

Population (2026-01-01)
  - Total: 1,336
  - Density: 139/km^{2} (361/sq mi)
- Time zone: UTC+1 (CET)
  - Summer (DST): UTC+2 (CEST)
- Postal code: 387 11
- Website: www.katovice.cz

Katovice (Czech pronunciation: [ˈkatovɪtsɛ]) is a market town in Strakonice District in the South Bohemian Region of the Czech Republic. It has about 1,300 inhabitants.

== Geography ==
Katovice is located about 5 kilometres (3 mi) west of Strakonice and 56 km (35 mi) northwest of České Budějovice. It lies on the border between the České Budějovice Basin and Blatná Uplands. The highest point is the hill Katovická hora (formerly known as Kněží hora) at 493 m (1,617 ft) above sea level. The area of the hill is protected as the Kněží hora Nature Reserve.

The market town is situated on the Otava River, in the historical Prácheňsko region.

== History ==
Katovice was founded in the 9th or 10th century, probably as a Slavic gold panning settlement on the Otava River and later a market settlement. The first written mention of Katovice is from 1045, when Duke Bretislav I donated the settlement to the Břevnov Monastery. Since then Katovice was mainly an agricultural village.

From the 13th century, Katovice was a serfdom village of the Střela Castle. In 1505, Katovice was mentioned as a market town for the first time.

In the 19th century, Katovice slowly developed. It was still an agricultural settlement; other sources of livelihood were pearl hunting and the floating of wood in the form of rafts. In 1867, the railway from Vienna to Cheb was built and helped industrialise Katovice. From 1913 until 1922, graphite was extracted from the steep hill of Kněží hora.

== Demographics ==
Historical population

Year	Pop.	±%
1869	816	—
1880	918	+12.5%
1890	916	−0.2%
1900	967	+5.6%
1910	1,046	+8.2%

Year	Pop.	±%
1921	1,099	+5.1%
1930	1,206	+9.7%
1950	1,161	−3.7%
1961	1,214	+4.6%
1970	1,194	−1.6%

Year	Pop.	±%
1980	1,214	+1.7%
1991	1,189	−2.1%
2001	1,250	+5.1%
2011	1,331	+6.5%
2021	1,303	−2.1%

Source: Censuses

== Transport ==
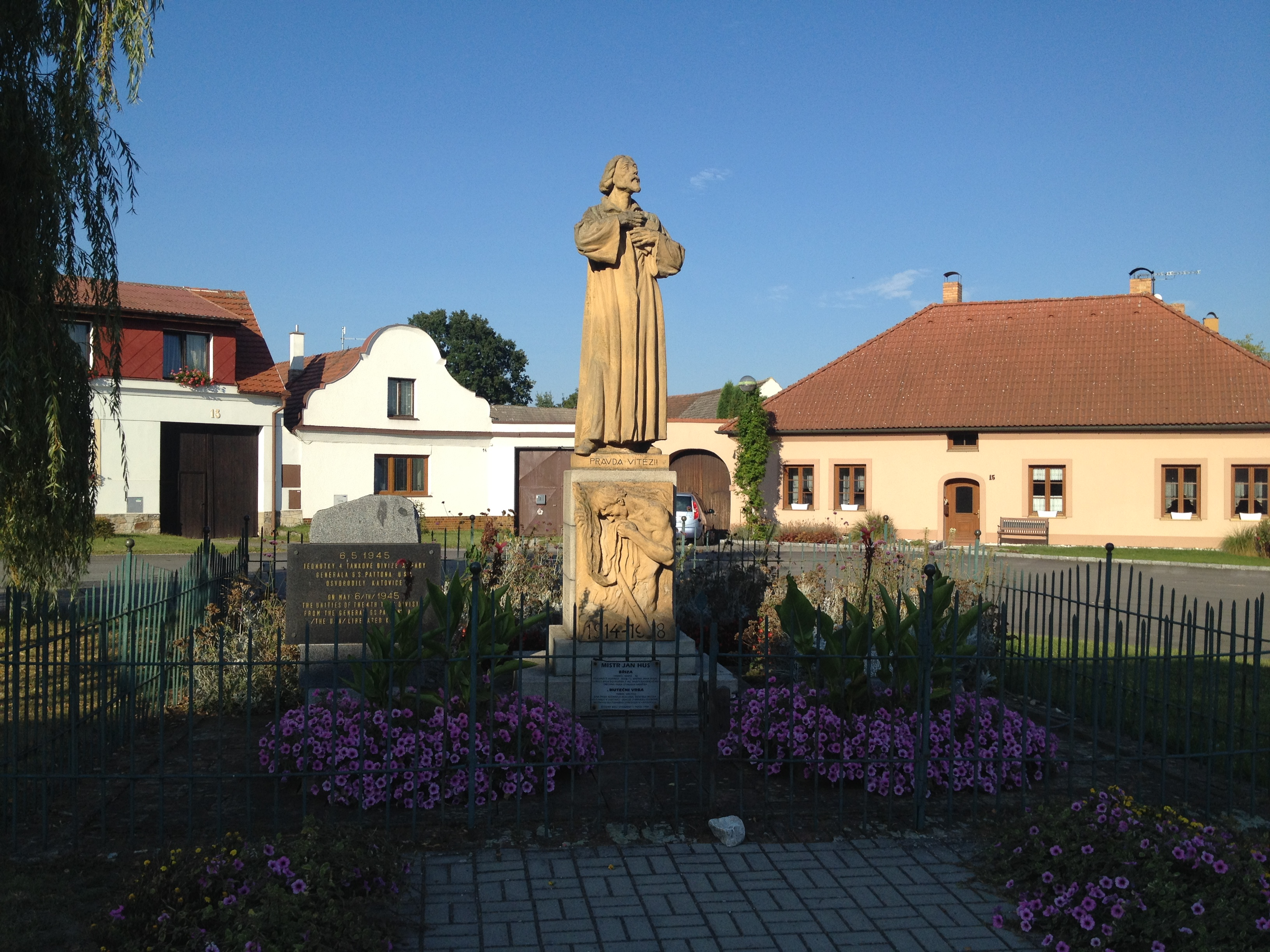
Statue of Jan Hus

Katovice is located on the railway line Strakonice–Klatovy.

== Sights ==
The main landmark is the Church of Saints Philip and James. Originally built in the Romanesque style, it was rebuilt to its current form in 1587.

== Notable people ==
- Václav Matějka (born 1937), film director and screenwriter
- Lukáš Kolářík (born 1984), politician
