= Břetislav Staš =

Czech seismologist and geophysicist (1928–2021)

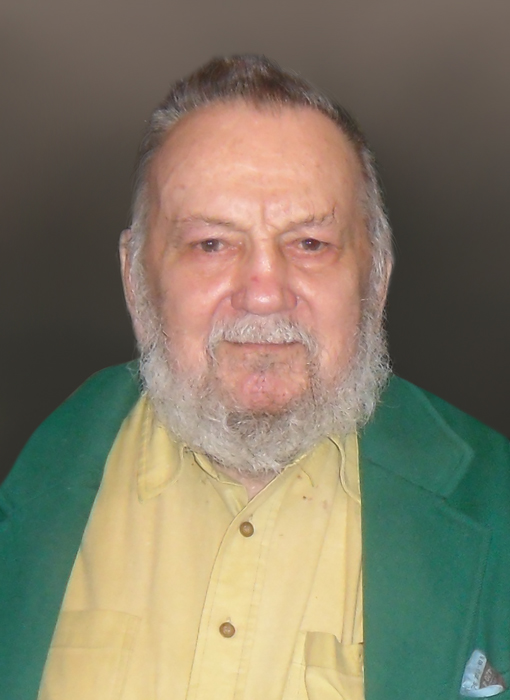
- Břetislav Staš in 2018
- Born: 1 July 1928; Ostrava, Czechoslovakia
- Died: 8 December 2021 (aged 93)
- Education: Czech Technical University in Prague; Charles University
- Spouse: Jiřina Bohdalová (divorced)
- Children: Simona Stašová
- Awards: Prize of the President of the Czechoslovak Socialist Republic, Golden Kahan OKR, Honorable Honor Bytom, Honorable Recognition of the Tbilisi Academy in Georgia
- Scientific career
- Fields: geophysics, seismology

Břetislav Staš (1 July 1928 – 8 December 2021) was a Czech seismologist and geophysicist. He is the father of Czech actress Simona Stašová and the first husband of Czech actress Jiřina Bohdalová.

== Biography ==
In 1951 he graduated from the Higher School of Special Education of the Czech Technical University in Prague and received the master's degree. After university he was required to have a compulsory two-year military service, where he joined the vehicle company in Dobřany as a military driver. He gained experience by driving all kinds of cars, half-track vehicles and self-propelled drilling rigs, which was later useful for his scientific-research activities.

From 1953 to 1959 he worked at Institute of Studying Coal Deposits, where he established a group for surface seismic measurements in order to refine the deposit and tectonic conditions of the coal deposit of Ostravsko Karviná mining area. He was responsible for the scientific-methodical, operational-technical and especially safety preparation. Using the methods of refraction and reflection he mapped the entire district of OKR, including its coal mines in Ostrava, Petřvald and Karviná parts of the Ostrava-Karviná mining area.

On the basis of an instruction from Federal Ministry of Fuel and Energy in 1959, together with the entire seismic group, he was transferred to the GPO Ostrava (Geological Survey of Ostrava) as a state delimitation, where it continued to carry out seismic measurements in the interest areas of OKR. He identified and documented the interest and structural-tectonic information necessary for gas and coal exploration. In 1962, he obtained a bachelor's technical license, authorizing him to perform and perform in-situ fireworks in situ for water, borehole and airplanes. Seismic waves cause seismic waves, which are important for surface and seismic measurements in situ. In 1964, he discovered a significant increase in the carbon monoxide layers in the southwest of the OKR, which was subsequently proven and defined as a new prospective coal deposit (today's Frenštát-jih).

In 1965, all surface geophysical measurements in the Czechoslovak Socialist Republic (CSSR) were again decided by the FMPE to be centralized into the national company Geofyzika - BRNO, the seismic group of GPO Ostrava. In the same year, after a successful refinement of the structural and tectonic state of the rock state in the OKR area, the GPO terminated its employment relationship with the agreement of further professional cooperation.

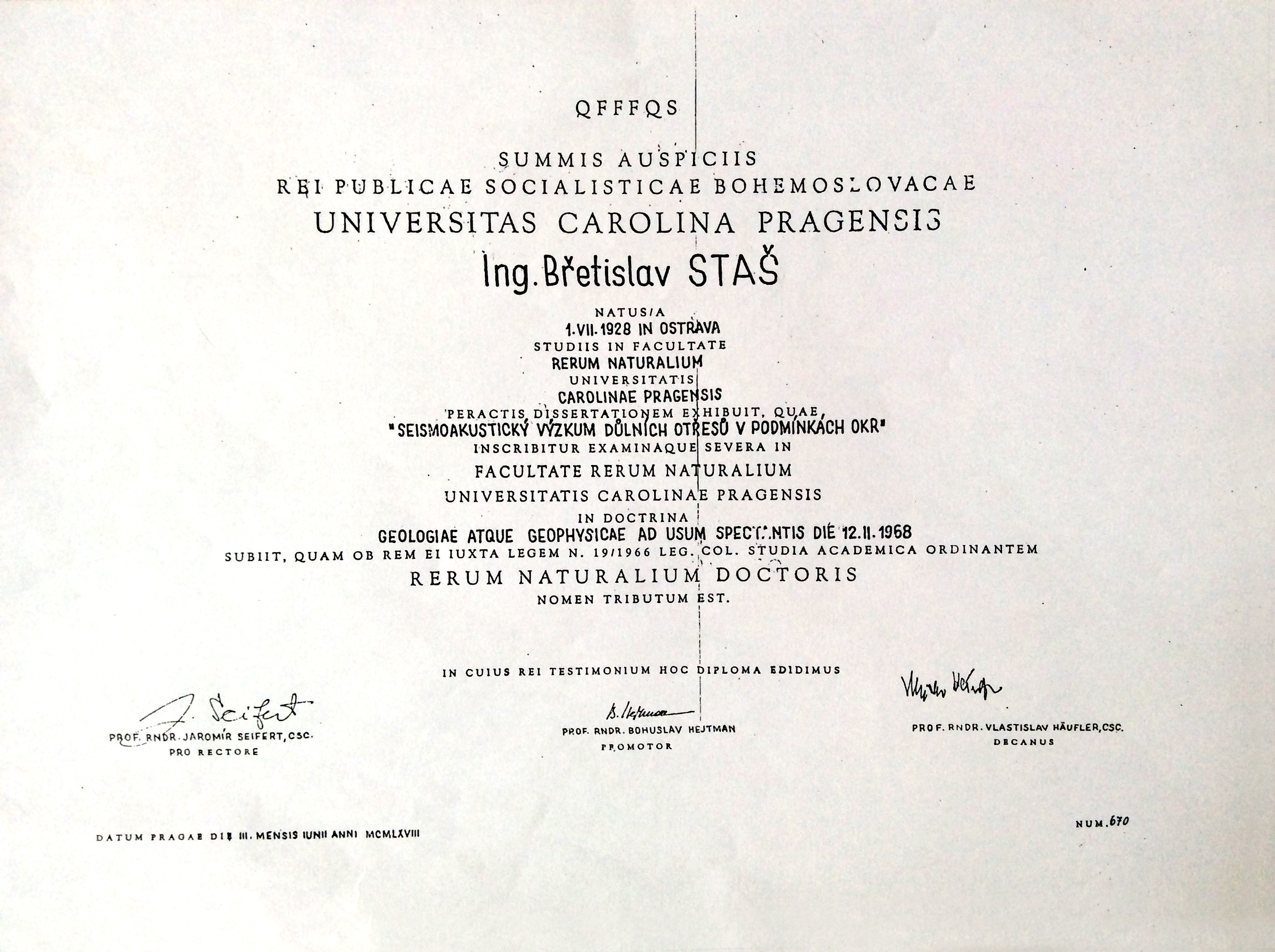
Charles University diploma (1968)

Between 1960 and 1966, he studied at Charles University for a long time. In 1966 he received the title RNDr. at the Faculty of Science of Charles University in geophysics.

Between 1965 and 1996, he cooperated with VVUU (Research Coal Institute), where he transferred his knowledge of surface seismic into the mining environment. His task was to carry out the necessary technical and safety measures and verify that the interest coal block could be utilized and that it was not tectonically disturbed. It has built up a new mining seismic facility within the SCI, which was a completely new discipline in the CSSR. He also succeeded in specifying, physically describing, evoking and using a completely new, world-known seismic so-called transverse seam wave (TSW) to which he obtained the patent. In-situ measurement results in the TSWmethod in the Czech Republic and the world have reached a high level of expertise that has enabled increased coal mining efficiency not only in the Czech Republic but also in the world.

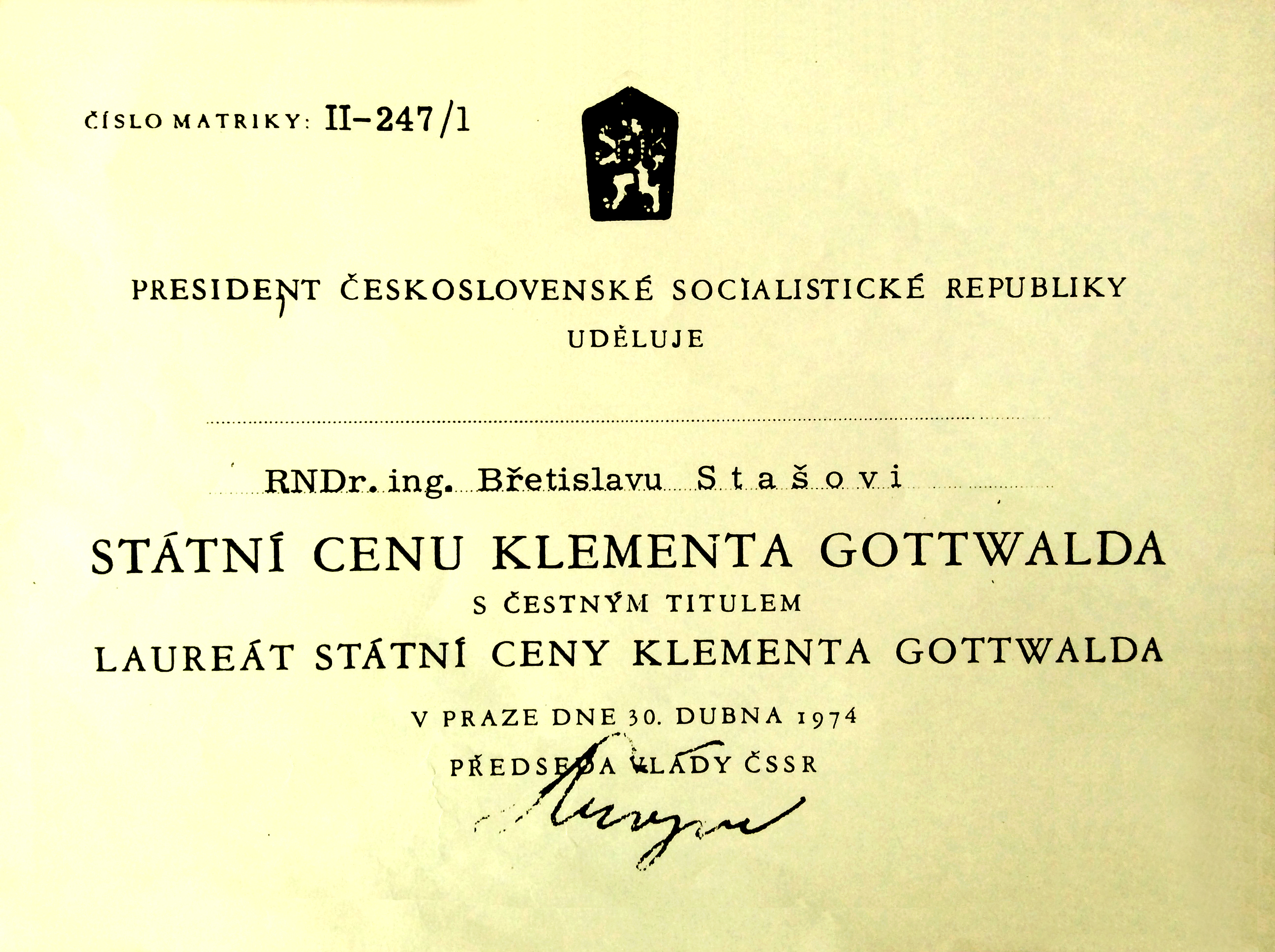
State Prize of the President of the Czechoslovak Socialist Republic (1974)

Within the framework of the VVÚS activities, more than 120 coal blocks (in all Czech and Slovak coal basins) were measured by the TSW method and sample measurements were carried out in the coal mines of Poland, Hungary, Georgia, China and Australia. TSW-method has been awarded with a patent of the Czechoslovak Socialist Republic, USA, England, Japan, China, Poland. He won the state prize of the President of the Czechoslovak Socialist Republic, Honorable Recognition of the Tbilisi Academy in Georgia, Honorable Mention Bytom, Zlatý kahan OKR.

Since 1989, the Czech coal mining has begun to undergo major changes that have resulted in restrictions on the activities of in-situ work. Later in 1996 he retired and terminated his employment with the VVUU.

In 1996 he founded GEOSTAS, which deals with astrophysics, on a prediction prognosis of the variability of the times of the origins and manifestations of the magnitudes of the intensity of the solar eruptions and the earthquake.

Staš died on 8 December 2021, at the age of 93.

== Patents ==
- PATENT LIST No 146 393, issued on 15 November 1972, STAŠ B. et al., & Quot; Equipment for Continuous Automatic Seismo-Acoustical Measurement of Changes in Dynamic Rock Mass Spectrum. & Quot
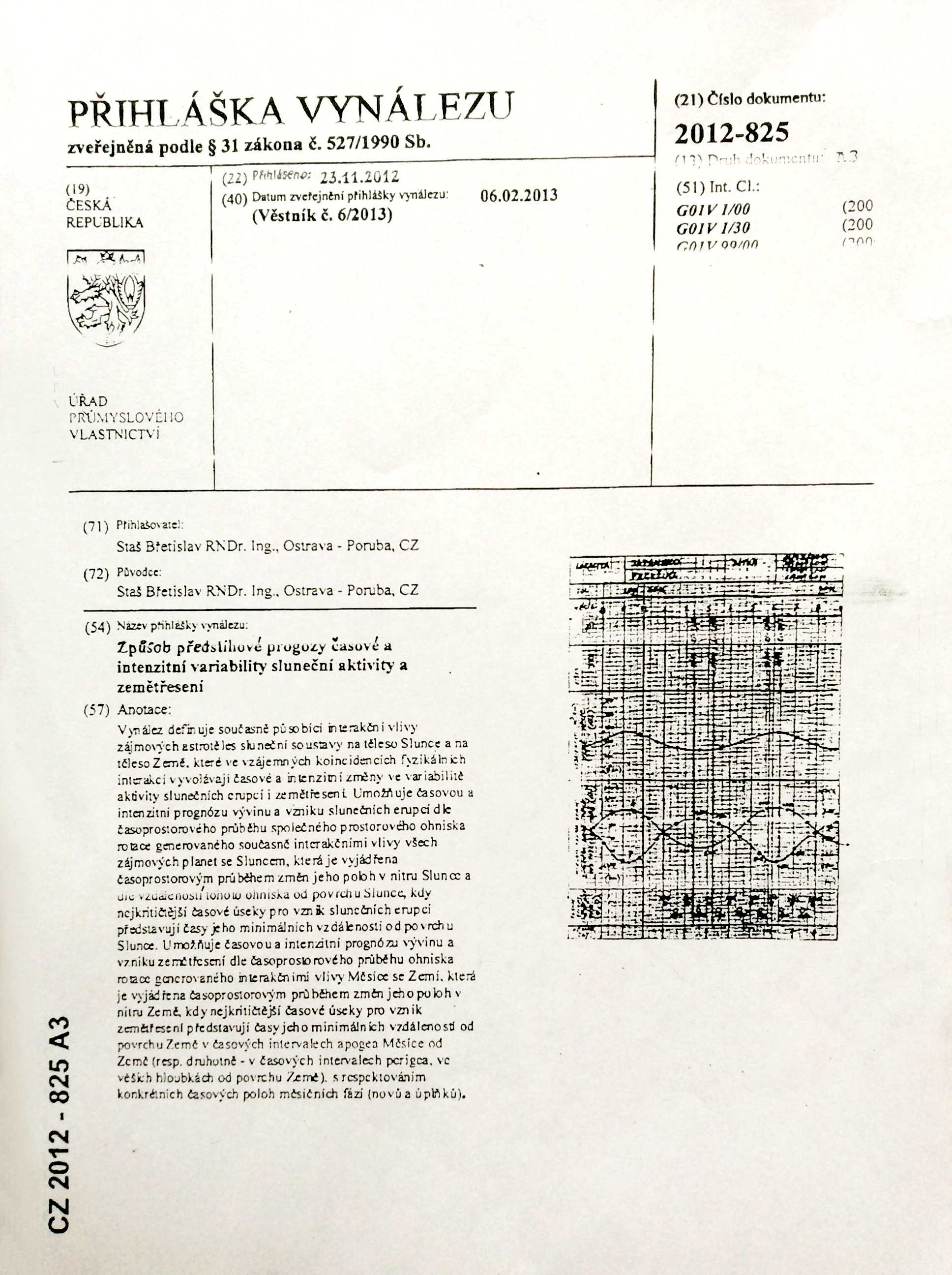
  Patent (2012) - A method of prediction prognosis of time and intensity variability of solar activity and earthquakes
- AUTHOR CERTIFICATE No. 150 849 - issued October 15, 1973, STAŠ B. et al. .: "Method and apparatus for determining the continuity of the power and the structural-tectonic elements of the rock layers, especially the coal seams."
- UNITED STATES PATENT No. 3,858,167, issued June 12, 1972 to U.S.A., STAŠ B. et al., & Quot; ARRANGEMENT FOR DETERMINATION OF THE CONTINUITY OF THICKNESS AND OF STRUCTURAL - TECTONIC ELEMENTS OF MINEABLE LAYERS, PARTICULARLY OF COAL SEAMS. & Quot
- PATENT SPECIFICATION No. 1,382,708, issued June 29, 1971 (England), STAŠ B. et al. .: IMPROVEMENTS IN AN0 RELATING TO SEISMOLOGY: "METHOD OF MAKING SEISMIC MEASUREMENTS IN MINES FOR EVALUATING THE CONTINUITY OF THICKNESS OF MINIBLE LAYERS, PARTICULARLY OF COAL SEAMS, IN WORKED PARTS OF MINES AND FOR DETECTING THE COURSE OF TECTONIC DISCLOSURES IN SUCH LAYERS. "
- JAPAN-PATENT No 1,046,023 - awarded in the 56th year of ŠOVA (JAPAN) - (CHINA), September 25, 1980, STAŠ B: translation from the Japanese script "METHOD OF DETERMINING CHANGE OF FEAST AND TEETHNOLOGY IN PREPARATION"
- DOCUMENT OF PATENTAY No 82.043 - awarded on 30 September 1972 (POLAND), STAŠ B. et al. .: "THE COVERAGE OF THE CIAGLOSCI GRUBOSCI AND ELEMENTS OF THE STRUCTURAL-TECHNICAL WARSTA OF SKALNY, ZWLASZCZA PODKLADOW WENGLOWYCH, UKLAD UKLAO DO STOSOWANIA TEGO SPOSOBU."
- AVTORSKOE SVIDĚTĚLSTVO No 402.840 - registered USSR: 23 July 1973 (USSR), STAŠ B. et al. .: "USTROJSTVO OLJA NEPRERYVNOGO AVTOMATIČESKOGO SEISMO-AKUSTIČESKOGO IZMERENIJA IZMĚNĚNIJ DYNAMIČESKOGO ŠUMA POROONOGO MASSIVA."
- AUTHOR CERTIFICATE No. 151,394 - issued Dec. 15, 1973, STAŠ B. et al. .: "CONNECTION FOR MEASURING THE RATE OF SALTATION OF ELASTIC WAVES IN HORNIN MASSIVE."
- AUTHENTIC CERTIFICATE No. 156.979 - Issued 15. 1. 1975, STAŠ V., LONG: "CONNECTION FOR SEISMIC MEASUREMENTS FROM MINING WORKS."
- AUTHENTIC CERTIFICATE No. 196.799 - issued March 31, 1982, STAŠ B. et al., & Quot; DEVICE FOR AUTOMATIC SELECTION OF HORN IMPULS AND THE DETERMINATION OF THEIR BASIC PARAMETERS IN NUMBER FORM. & Quot;
- AUTHENTIC CERTIFICATE No. 196.912 - Issued October 30, 1981, STAŠ B. et al. .: "METHOD OF BREACH OF HORNINS AND CREATION OF WEAKNESSES"
- CERTIFICATE CERTIFICATE No. 203.220 - Issued on September 15, 1983, STAY B.: "THE INVESTIGATION METHOD DOES NOT KNOW THE AREAS OF THE ASSEMBLY OF THE PASSING SURVEY".
- AUTHENTIC CERTIFICATE C. 215.184 - Issued October 15, 1982, STAŠ B .: "THE METHOD OF REGULATION OF THE SEISMIC ACTIONS OF THE BULGARIAN BURNS ON DULE OBJECTS."
- CERTIFICATE OF CERTIFICATE C. 215.565 issued April 15, 1984, STAŠ B: "THE METHOD OF INVESTIGATION AND MEASURING THE SEISMIC EFFECTS OF BULGARIAN BURNS ON THE STABILITY OF MILITARY WORKS."
- AUTHENTIC CERTIFICATE No. 265.101 - Issued December 15, 1989, STAW B .: "METHOD OF DETECTION OF FLUATIC CHANGES IN VOLTAGE RANGE IN INTEREST PHYSICAL ENVIRONMENT."
- AUTHENTIC CERTIFICATE No. 266.855 - Issued 14. 12. 1990, STAŠ B: "DEVICES FOR THE DETECTION OF THE SEISMIC DIRECTION DIRECTIONS FOR THE OBSERVATION POINT."
- PATENT BACKGROUND No. 299,496 - issued August 13, 2008, STAŠ B: "THE METHOD OF USING DYNAMICS OF AROMAFLOWS FOR THE PROJECTION OF CRITICAL TIME INTERVALS OF AGRICULTURAL GAMES."
