= Lukáš Kolářík =

Czech politician

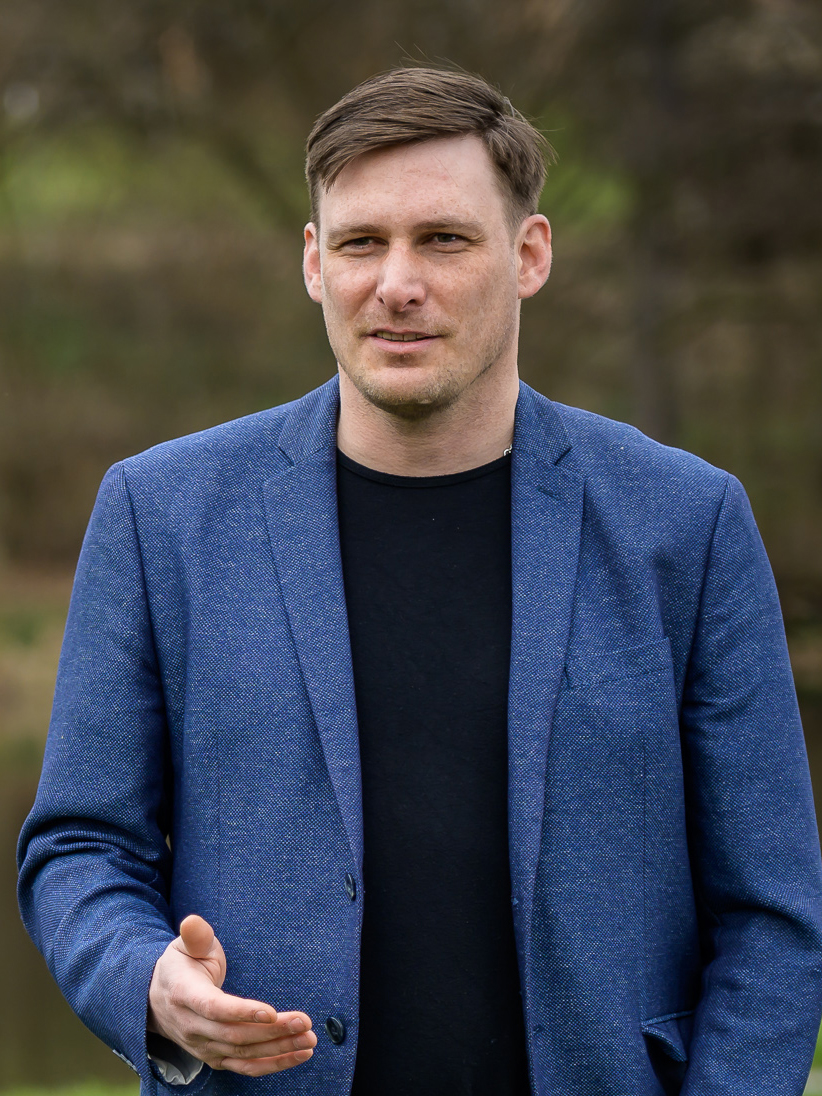
- Kolářík in 2021

Deputy Minister of the Interior of the Czech Republic
- In office 22 December 2021 – 4 July 2023

Member of the Chamber of Deputies of the Czech Republic
- In office 21 October 2017 – 21 October 2021

Representative of the municipality of Katovice
- In office 6 October 2018 – 24 September 2022

Personal details
- Born: 5 March 1984 (age 41) Katovice, Czechoslovakia
- Party: Czech Pirate Party
- Children: Three daughters

Lukáš Kolářík (born 5 March 1984) is a Czech politician who is a member of Czech Pirate Party. He previously served as Deputy Minister of the Interior of the Czech Republic from 2021 until 2023, member of the Chamber of Deputies of the Czech Republic from 2017 until 2021, and a representative of Katovice from 2018 until 2022.

== Political career ==
=== 2010s ===
Kolářík has been a member of the Pirates since 2013, serving as chairman of the regional association of the South Bohemian Region. During the 2016 Czech regional elections, he ran for the Pirates in the Representative Office of the South Bohemian Region, but was unsuccessful.

In the 2017 Czech parliamentary election, Kolářík was elected as deputy leader of the Pirates in the South Bohemian Region. He later served as deputy chairman of the Committee on Security of the Chamber of Deputies as well as chairman of the Subcommittee on Information Technology and Benefit Systems. Kolářík has served as vice-chairman of Czech Pirate Party parliamentary club since 2018.

Kolářík was elected on the list for Czech Pirate Party as a representative of Katovice in the 2018 Czech municipal elections.

=== 2020s ===
During the 2020 Czech regional elections in South Bohemia, Kolářík ran from the tenth place of the pirate candidate and became the first alternative candidate.

In the 2021 Czech parliamentary election, Kolářík was the leader of the candidate coalition of Pirates and Mayors in the South Bohemian Region. He did not defend the mandate, thus was not elected.

Kolářík was appointed Deputy Minister of the Interior of the Czech Republic under Vít Rakušan on 22 December 2021, but resigned from this position in July 2023 for personal reasons. The decision was preceded by a fight between two women; Kolářík was supposed to defend his wife Jana, whilst the other woman was supposed to be a ministry employee (assistant), with whom he presumed to have an affair. According to his own words, the assistant threatened him and his wife with a knife. The leadership of Czech Pirate Party invited Kolářík to consider serving in party functions and approached him for addressing the problem late.

== Personal life ==
Kolářík is married and has three daughters.
