= Václav Kopta =

Czech actor

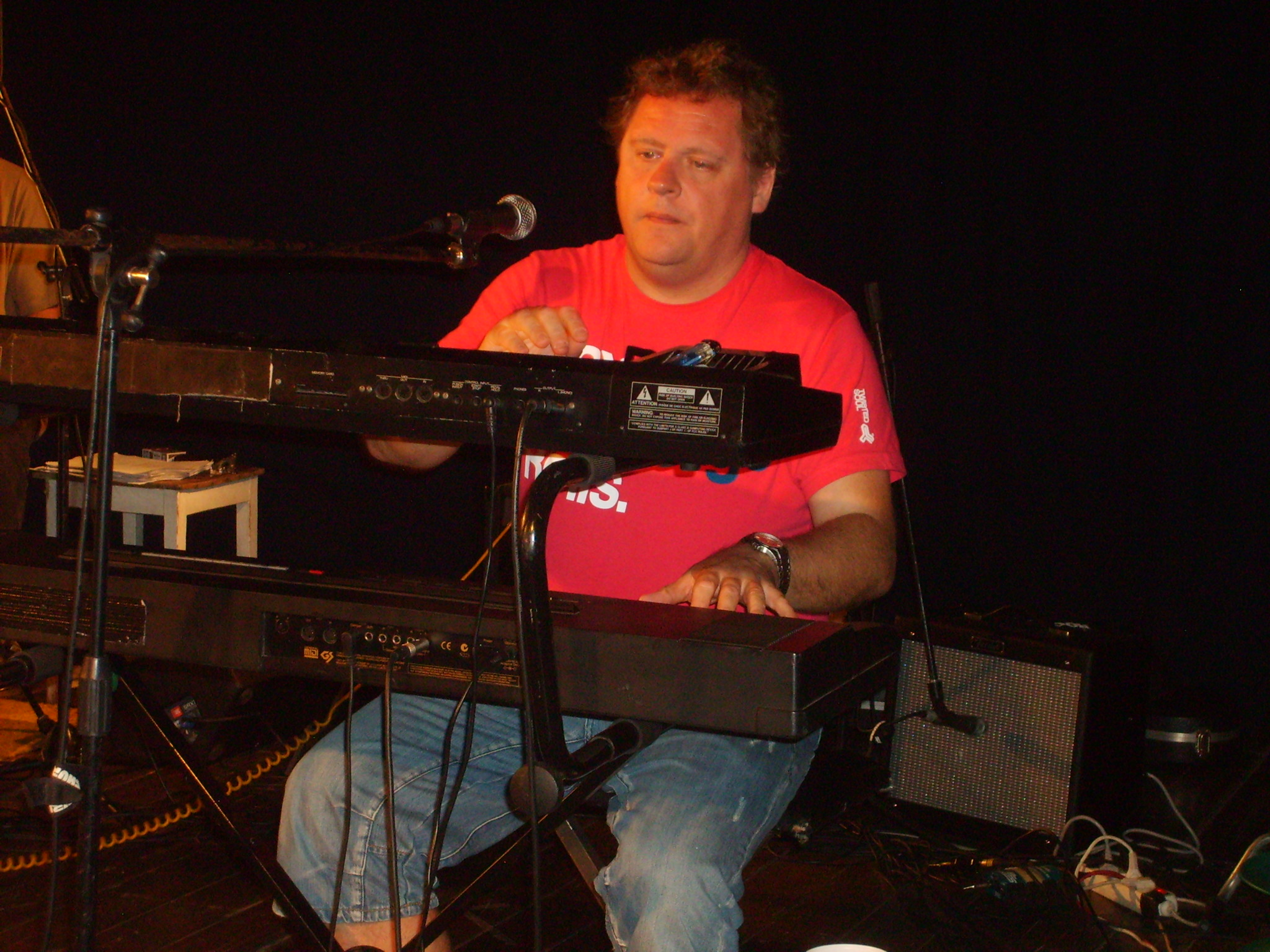
- Born: 21 June 1965 (age 60); Prague, Czechoslovakia
- Occupation: Actor
- Years active: 1982–present
- Spouse: Simona Vrbická (m. 1995)

Václav Kopta (born 21 June 1965) is a Czech actor, musician, songwriter and host.

In May 2022 Kopta won the ninth season of a reality singing series Tvoje tvář má známý hlas.

== Selected filmography ==
=== Film ===
- Sněženky a machři (1983)
- Sněženky a machři po 25 letech (2008)
- The Don Juans (2013)
- Lost in Munich (2015)
- Charlatan (2020)
- Together (2022)
- Emergency Situation (2022)

=== Television ===
- Gympl s (r)učením omezeným (2012)
- Doktor Martin (2015)
- Cosmic (2016)
- Svět pod hlavou (2017)
