= Radoslav Brzobohatý =

Czech actor (1932–2012)

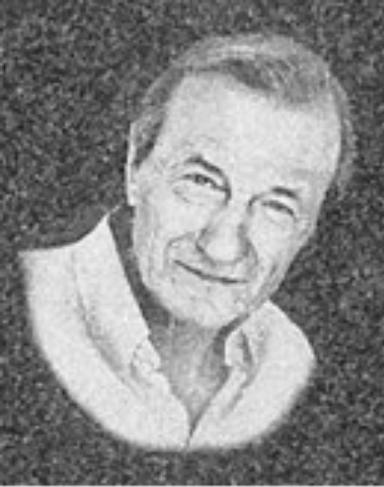
- Memorial photo on Brzobohatý's grave
- Born: 13 September 1932; Vrútky, Czechoslovakia
- Died: 12 September 2012 (aged 79); Prague, Czech Republic
- Resting place: Vyšehrad Cemetery, Prague
- Education: Academy of Performing Arts in Prague
- Occupation: Actor
- Years active: 1959–2012
- Spouse: Jiřina Bohdalová (1970–1982)

Radoslav Brzobohatý (Czech pronunciation: [ˈradoslav ˈbr̩zoboɦatiː]; 13 September 1932 – 12 September 2012) was a Czech actor. He acted in film, television and theatre, portraying around 200 roles during his career.

== Life and career ==
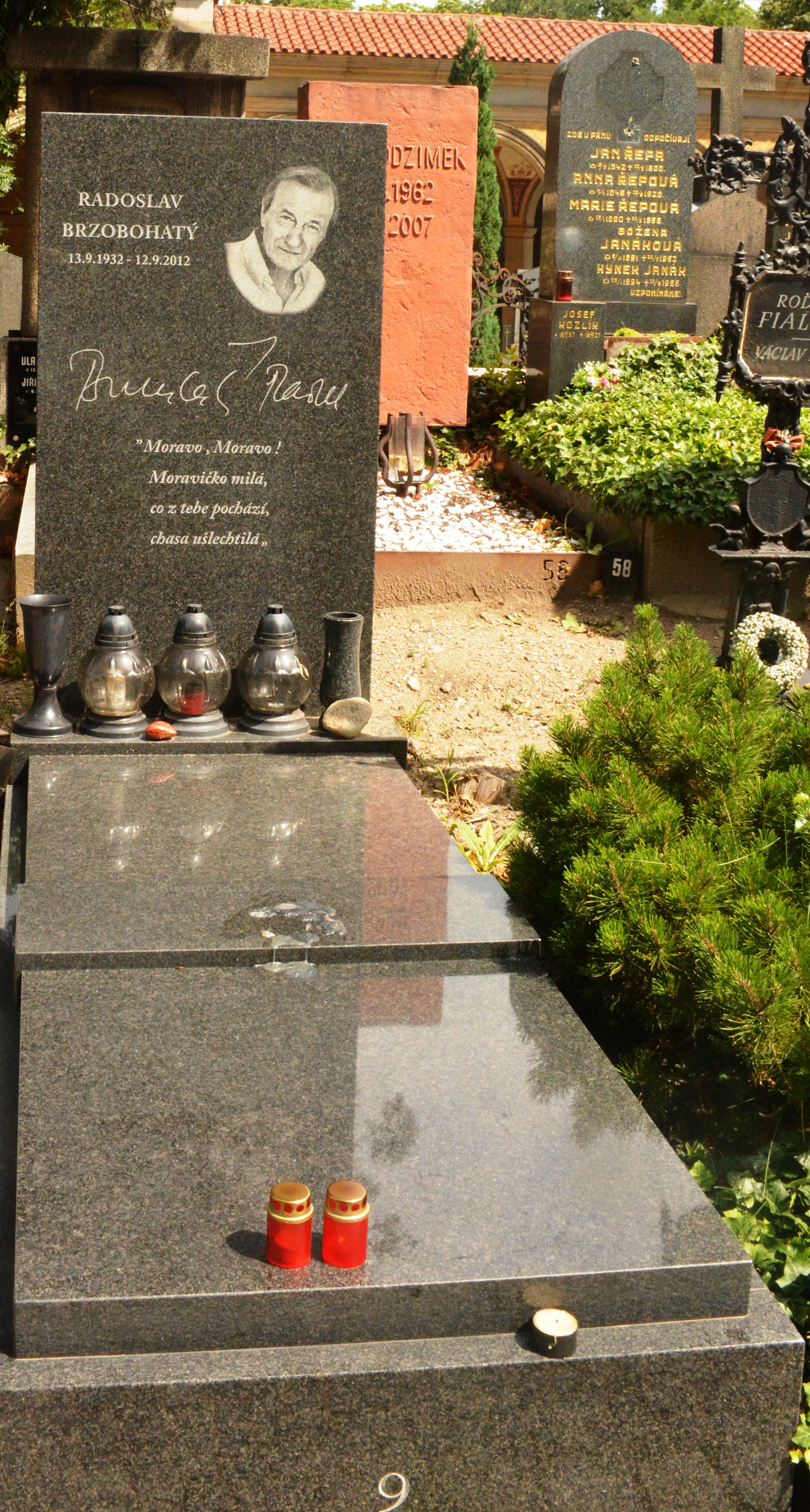
Grave of Brzobohatý at Vyšehrad Cemetery

Radoslav Brzobohatý was born on 13 September 1932 in Vrútky in the Slovak part of Czechoslovakia, into a sailor's family. In 1940, his family returned to Moravia, where they came from. He spent his childhood in Valašské Meziříčí. At the age of eight, he first appeared on stage, in an adaptation of Broučci. He also played the violin in his childhood. Before finishing his studies at the gymnasium in Valašské Meziříčí, he was expelled. He then trained as a knitting machine mechanic in Krnov, where he co-founded a music group and began playing in an amateur theatre.

Brzobohatý graduated from the Theatre Faculty of the Academy of Performing Arts in Prague (DAMU) in 1954. Between 1954 and 1963, he played in various regional theatres (in Kolín, Most, Olomouc and Příbram). He then moved to Prague, where he played in the S. K. Neumann Theatre. From 1967 to 1999, he played in the Vinohrady Theatre. Since the late 1990s, he was a guest actor in various theatres.

Brzobohatý first appeared in film in 1959, in Mstitel. His breakthrough role was a farmer in All My Good Countrymen (1968). His portrayal of Czech patriot F. L. Věk in the TV series F. L. Věk (1971–1972) is also considered to be among the best performances of his life. The Ear (1970) is considered one of his most significant films, but because it was not released until 1990 due to censorship, his performance was only recognized retrospectively.

Brzobohatý was charismatic and had an athletic build, which was reflected in the types of characters he played. He played in various genres in theatre and film. He portrayed about 200 roles during his career.

Brzobohatý suddenly died in Prague on 12 September 2012 at the age of 79, only one day before his 80th birthday. He is buried at Vyšehrad Cemetery.

=== Family and marriages ===
Brzobohatý was married three times and all his wives were actresses. He had a daughter, Radana, with his first wife Jarmila Kolářová. In 1970 he married Jiřina Bohdalová, but their marriage was full of disagreements and they divorced in 1982. He lived with his third wife, Slovak actress Hana Gregorová, from 1981. They had a son, Ondřej Gregor Brzobohatý, who became a musician, TV presenter and actor. In 2004, Radoslav Brzobohatý and Hana founded the Radoslav Brzobohatý Theatre, where he also played alongside Ondřej. He reconciled with Jiřina Bohdalová towards the end of his life and starred with her in his last film, Vrásky z lásky (2012).

== Selected filmography ==
- Mstitel (1959)
- Bílá spona (1960)
- Atentát (1964)
- Hvězda zvaná Pelyněk (1964)
- A Leap in the Dark (1964)
- All My Good Countrymen (1968)
- Záhada hlavolamu (TV series; 1969)
- The Ear (1970)
- I Killed Einstein, Gentlemen (1970)
- F. L. Věk (TV series; 1971–1972)
- Thirty Cases of Major Zeman (TV series; 1974–1976)
- Do Be Quick (1977)
- The Prince and the Evening Star (1978)
- Night Riders (1981)
- Sněženky a machři (1982)
- Angel in a Devil's Body (1983)
- The Night of the Emerald Moon (1984)
- Scalpel, Please (1985)
- Slavné historky zbojnické (TV series; 1986)
- Cirkus Humberto (TV series; 1988)
- It Will Stay Between Us (2003)
- Sněženky a machři po 25 letech (2008)
- Vyprávěj (TV series; 2009–2012)
