= Gympl s (r)učením omezeným =

- Genre: Comedy
- Written by: Lucie Paulová, Lenka Hornová, Jitka Bártů, Kateřina Bártů, David Litvák, Jan Drbohlav, Jan Prušinovský, Tomáš Baldýnský, Jitka Musilová, Jiří Suchý, Halina Pawlowská, Martin Poláček, Vilém Hakl, Jonáš Paul, Stanislav Fisher
- Directed by: Jiří Chlumský, Libor Kodad, Vojtěch Moravec, Marián Kleis ml.
- Starring: Ondřej Brzobohatý
- Country of origin: Czech Republic
- Original language: Czech
- No. of seasons: 3
- No. of episodes: 96+pilot

Production
- Running time: 60 minutes

Original release
- Network: TV Nova
- Release: September 2, 2012 – December 11, 2013

Gympl s (r)učením omezeným is a Czech comedy television series broadcast by TV Nova in 2012 and 2013. It is set in the environment of a small-town High School. The series was introduced by an introductory pilot that aired on 2 September 2012, with the first episode premiering the following day. On 25 February 2013, TV Nova launched a second season, with a third season following from 26 August 2013.

On 21 October 2013, TV Nova announced that the third season was the last. Nova also confirmed that they did not expect Gympl to be an endless series, and one of the reasons for the termination is also the declining viewership. The final episode aired on December 11, 2013. It was also later revealed that Nova is open to continuing the series later.

Although it is also known as Gympl for short, it has no direct connection to the 2007 Czech film Gympl.

== Synopsis ==
The Jan Amos Komenský High School in Hradec is losing its fight against a bad reputation. Everything has gone so far that the dubious high school is facing the last year of its existence. The situation seems intractable, because "something" fundamental would have to happen to avert the impending cancellation. But the road to such a goal is thorny and the hope for a miracle is diminishing day by day. The headmaster resigns himself to alcohol, the teaching staff is divided into several camps, and more than with teaching it is concerned with internal conflicts. The key moment of the dying school is the day when the young teacher Adam Kábrt arrives. It looks like the teaching staff will be "richer" with an outsider with a reputation as negative as that of the local school. Quirky teaching methods, disdain for authority and sometimes too harsh an attitude towards colleagues and students will not add much to his bad name. It seems only a matter of time before Adam loses the rest of his illusions.

== Cast and characters ==
- Ondřej Brzobohatý as Adam Kábrt
- Karel Heřmánek as Vladimír Matula
- Libuše Šafránková as Eliška Holoubková (season 1)
- Jan Šťastný as Ctirad Volejník (season 2–3)
- Zuzana Bydžovská as Milada Smutná
- Václav Kopta as Miroslav Kuliš
- Milan Šteindler as Marcel Lichtenberg
- Lucie Benešová as Eva Lenerová
