= Můj vysvlečenej deník =

2012 Czech comedy film

- Directed by: Martin Dolenský
- Written by: Johana Rubínová; Jan Hlaváč; Martin Dolenský
- Produced by: Štefan Voržáček
- Starring: Veronika Khek Kubařová; Petra Špalková; Igor Bareš
- Cinematography: Michael Gahut
- Edited by: Jan Daňhel
- Music by: Petr Wajsar
- Distributed by: Bontonfilm
- Release date: 26 April 2012 (Czech Republic)
- Running time: 102 minutes
- Country: Czech Republic
- Language: Czech
- Box office: 1,508,876 CZK

Můj vysvlečenej deník (lit. 'My Naked Diary') is a 2012 Czech comedy film directed by Martin Dolenský.

== Cast ==
- Veronika Khek Kubařová as Johana
- Petra Špalková as stepmother Sába
- Igor Bareš as father
- Simona Stašová as doctor Lichá
- Veronika Žilková as Valengová
- Jan Antonín Duchoslav as Ivan
- Šárka Krausová as Andy
- Sandra Černodrinská as Káča
- Berenika Kohoutová as Kasandra
- Marika Šoposká as Margareta
- Jaroslav Plesl as Talacek
