= Jiřina Bohdalová =

Czech actress (born 1931)

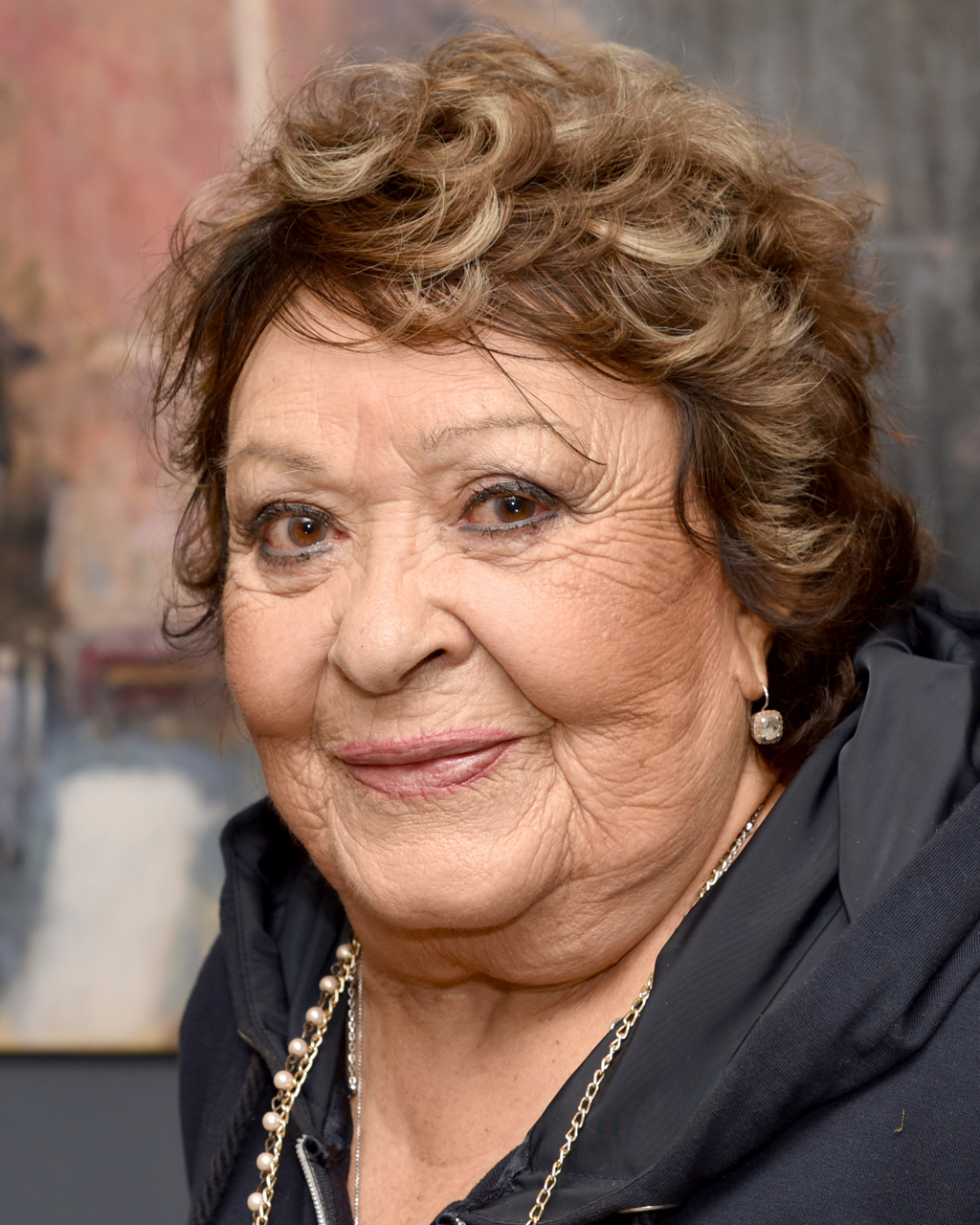
- Jiřina Bohdalová in 2022
- Born: 3 May 1931 (age 95); Prague, Czechoslovakia
- Occupation: Actress
- Years active: 1937–present
- Spouse: Břetislav Staš, Radoslav Brzobohatý (m. 1970–1982)
- Children: Simona Stašová

Jiřina Bohdalová (born 3 May 1931) is a Czech actress. She played over 200 film roles during her career and is among the most popular Czech actresses. For her lifelong contribution to Czech film and theatre, she has received several awards and state distinctions. She is the mother of actress Simona Stašová.

== Life ==
Jiřina Bohdalová was born on 3 May 1931 in Prague. She graduated from a high school in Prague in 1949 and then she moved to Ostrava, where she taught at a primary school. Then she decided to study acting. She graduated from the Theatre Faculty of the Academy of Performing Arts in Prague (DAMU) in 1957. She is the mother of actress Simona Stašová.

The StB attempted to blackmail Bohdalová into becoming an informant, but she resisted this effort. After the publication of a register of StB collaborators which included her name, she successfully had the error of her inclusion rectified.

Jiřina Bohdalová came under suspicion in the 1990s of having collaborated with the communist secret police StB. However, it turned out in court that she had been wrongly included in the secret police's lists of collaborators, which were made public, even though her family was persecuted in the 1950s and her father spent six years in prison.

== Career ==
She began acting in theatre and film at an early age. After she graduated from DAMU, she received an offer from Jan Werich to join the actor's troupe at Divadlo ABC theatre which she accepted. Later on, she performed in many other "City Theatres of Prague" (Městská divadla pražská). From 1967 to the present day, she has a permanent engagement at the "Vinohrady Theatre". Bohdalová has done extensive work as a voice actress, especially TV characters in various bedtime stories. She has made numerous appearances in different fairy-tales, short stories, TV films, serials, plays and many programmes of her own.

She played over 200 film roles during her career.

== Selected filmography ==
- The Cassandra Cat (1963)
- The King of Kings (1963)
- Hvězda zvaná Pelyněk (1964)
- Přísně tajné premiéry (1967)
- Světáci (1969)
- The Ear (1969)
- Four Murders Are Enough, Darling (1971)
- Chalupáři (TV series; 1975)
- Všichni proti všem (1977)
- Létající Čestmír (TV series; 1984)
- Cirkus Humberto (TV series; 1988)
- Přítelkyně z domu smutku (TV series; 1992)
- Nesmrtelná teta (1993)
- Rebelové (2001)
- Angel of the Lord 2 (2016)

=== As narrator ===
Bohdalová is known as the narrator of several animated series created for the Večerníček TV program, including:

- Pohádky ovčí babičky (1966)
- Pohádky z mechu a kapradí (1968)
- Rákosníček (1975)
- O chytré kmotře lišce (1983)
- Malá čarodějnice (1984)
- O skřítku Racochejlovi (1997)

== Honours ==
In 2011, Bohdalová was awarded by the Thalia Award for the lifetime achievement in drama. In 2013, she was awarded by the Czech Republic's Medal of Merit (First Class) for services to the state in the field of culture. In 2016, she was awarded the Outstanding Artistic Contribution to Czech Cinematography Award at the Karlovy Vary International Film Festival. She is a recipient of the Order of the White Lion. She has also won audience polls for most popular Czech actress several times.

She has won two Czech Lion awards for her roles in Nesmrtelná teta and Fany.
