= Simona Stašová =

Czech actress (born 1955)

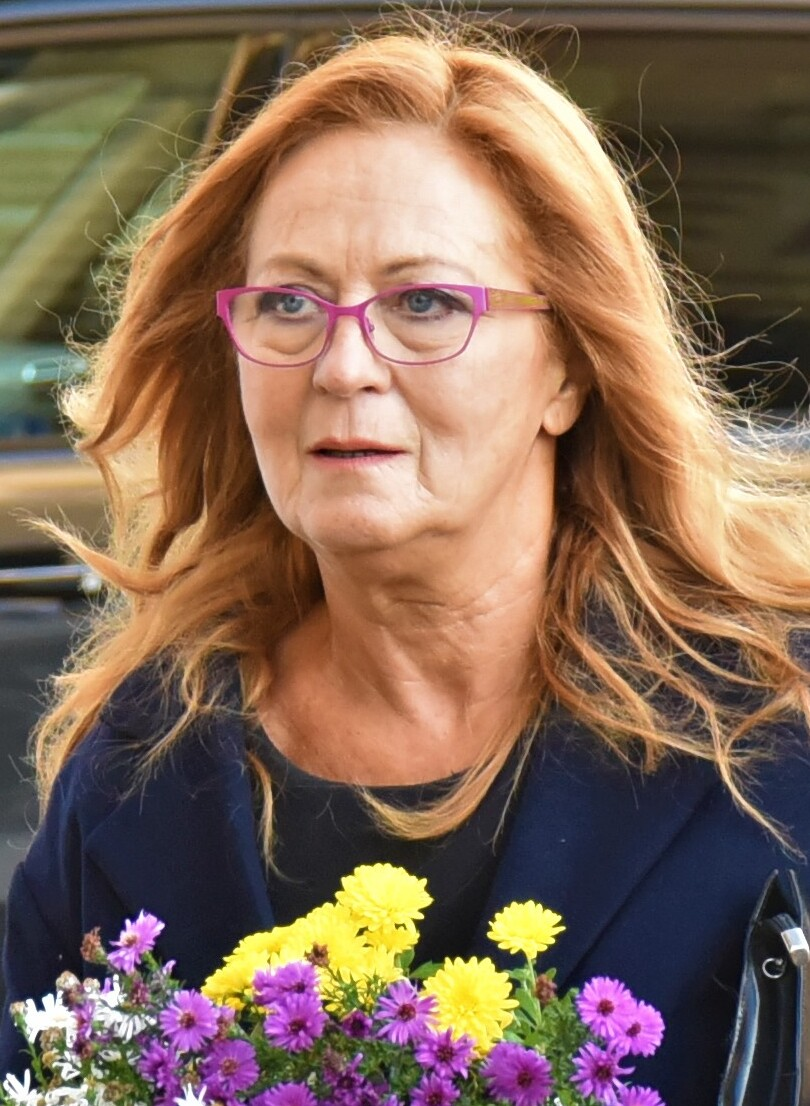
- Stašová in 2019
- Born: 19 March 1955 (age 71); Prague, Czechoslovakia
- Occupation: Actress
- Years active: 1973–present
- Parent(s): Jiřina Bohdalová (mother), Břetislav Staš (father)

Simona Stašová (born 19 March 1955) is a Czech stage, film and television actress. Since making her theatre debut in 1976, she has acted on stage in theatres and appeared in numerous films and television productions. Stašová has won multiple awards for her acting, both inside her native Czech Republic and internationally.

== Career ==
Stašová studied at the Faculty of Theatre in Prague. After graduating, she acted at the Jihočeské divadlo in České Budějovice in 1976 before moving to Divadlo E. F. Buriana in Prague between 1977 and 1991.

Stašová was nominated for an Elsa television award in 2004, for her role in the Česká televize production Místo nahoře. At the 2007 Thalia Awards she won the category of Best Actress in a Play, for her performance of the role of Evy Meara in a production of Neil Simon's The Gingerbread Lady (Czech: Drobečky z perníku) at the Antonín Dvořák Theatre in Příbram. Stašová was named Actress of the Year at the 2014 TýTý Awards. At the 2014 Tiburon Film Festival, Stašová was named winner in the Best Actress category for her role in the 2013 television movie Sebemilenec. She was also awarded for the same role, winning at the Seoul International Drama Awards in 2015.

== Personal life ==
Stašová is the daughter of Czech actress Jiřina Bohdalová and Břetislav Staš, who are divorced. She has been married three times: to Czech actor Pavel Trávníček, Italian professor Eusebio Ciccotti and Czech actor Pavel Skřípal. Stašová has two sons, Marek and Vojta, from her marriages to Ciccotti and Skřípal respectively.

== Selected filmography ==
=== Films ===
- Incomplete Eclipse (1982)
- Jako kníže Rohan (1983)
- Cosy Dens (1999)
- Divided We Fall (2000)
- Victims and Murderers (2000)
- Román pro ženy (2005)
- Men in Hope (2011)
- Můj vysvlečenej deník (2012)

=== Television ===
- Youngest of the Hamr's Family (1975)
- Arabela (1979)
- Místo nahoře (2004)
- Sebemilenec (TV film, 2013)

== Awards and nominations ==
Year	Association	Category	Work	Result
2004	Elsa Awards	Best Actress in an Original Television Drama	Místo nahoře	Nominated
2005	Czech Lion Awards	Best Supporting Actress	Román pro ženy	Nominated
2007	Thalia Awards	Best Actress in a Play	The Gingerbread Lady	Won
2014	TýTý Awards	Actress of the Year		Won
2014	Tiburon Film Festival	Best Actress	Sebemilenec	Won
2015	Seoul International Drama Awards	Best Actress	Sebemilenec	Won
