= Hlinné =

- Municipality
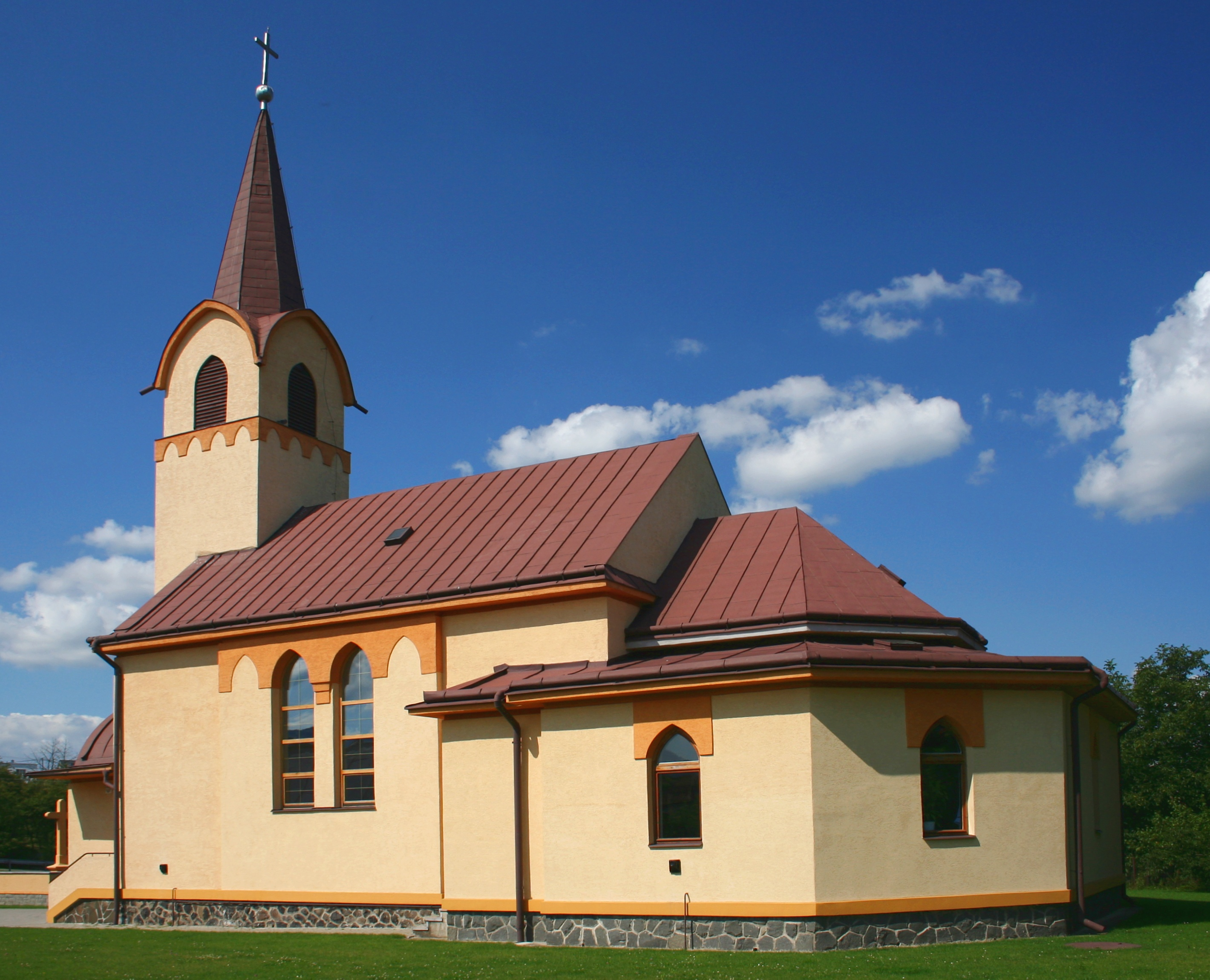

- Flag

- Location of Hlinné in the Prešov Region Location of Hlinné in Slovakia
- Coordinates: 48.95°N 21.58°E
- Country: Slovakia
- Region: Prešov Region
- District: Vranov nad Topľou District
- First mentioned: 1402

Area
  - Total: 14.58 km^{2} (5.63 sq mi)
- Elevation: 151 m (495 ft)

Population (2025)
  - Total: 1,929
- Time zone: UTC+1 (CET)
  - Summer (DST): UTC+2 (CEST)
- Postal code: 943 5
- Area code: +421 57
- Vehicle registration plate (until 2022): VT
- Website: www.hlinne.sk

Hlinné (Hungarian: Agyagospatak, until 1899: Agyagos) is a village and municipality in Vranov nad Topľou District in the Prešov Region of eastern Slovakia.

== History ==
In historical records the village was first mentioned in 1402. Before the establishment of independent Czechoslovakia in 1918, Hlinné was part of Zemplén County within the Kingdom of Hungary. From 1939 to 1945, it was part of the Slovak Republic. On 18 January 1945, the Red Army entered Hlinné and it was once again part of Czechoslovakia.

== Geography ==
The municipality lies at an altitude of 151 metres (495 ft) and covers an area of 14.58 km^{2} (5.63 sq mi) (2025).

== Population ==
Population statistic (10 years)
Year	1995	2005	2015	2025
Count	1474	1661	1826	1929
Difference		+12.68%	+9.93%	+5.64%

Population statistic
Year	2024	2025
Count	1917	1929
Difference		+0.62%

It has a population of 1929 people (31 December 2025).

=== Ethnicity ===
Census 2021 (1+ %)
Ethnicity	Number	Fraction
Slovak	1763	93.42%
Romani	280	14.83%
Not found out	57	3.02%
Total	1887	

In year 2021 was 1887 people by ethnicity 1763 as Slovak, 280 as Romani, 57 as Not found out, 9 as Other, 4 as Rusyn, 3 as Czech, 2 as German and 2 as Hungarian.

Note on population: The difference values of population numbers in the table "Population statistic" and in the sections "Ethnicity" & "Religion" is caused by the use of various statistical methods.

=== Religion ===
Census 2021 (1+ %)
Religion	Number	Fraction
Greek Catholic Church	1139	60.36%
Roman Catholic Church	418	22.15%
Evangelical Church	132	7%
None	67	3.55%
Jehovah's Witnesses	36	1.91%
Not found out	35	1.85%
Church of the Brethren	21	1.11%
Total	1887	

In year 2021 was 1887 people by religion 1139 from Greek Catholic Church, 418 from Roman Catholic Church, 132 from Evangelical Church, 67 from None, 36 from Jehovah's Witnesses, 35 from Not found out, 21 from Church of the Brethren, 18 from Apostolic Church, 8 from Christian Congregations in Slovakia, 5 from Eastern Orthodox Church, 4 from Ad hoc movements, 3 from Calvinist Church and 1 from Other and not ascertained christian church.

== Genealogical resources ==
The records for genealogical research are available at the state archive "Statny Archiv in Presov, Slovakia"

- Roman Catholic church records (births/marriages/deaths): 1769-1910 (parish B)
- Greek Catholic church records (births/marriages/deaths): 1852-1940 (parish A)
- Lutheran church records (births/marriages/deaths): 1786-1904 (parish B)

== See also ==
- List of municipalities and towns in Slovakia
