= Vzteklina =

- Genre: Crime, Thriller
- Directed by: Tomáš Bařina
- Starring: Kryštof Hádek, Johana Matoušková
- Country of origin: Czech Republic
- Original language: Czech
- No. of seasons: 1
- No. of episodes: 6

Production
- Running time: 56 minutes

Original release
- Network: ČT1
- Release: January 10 – February 14, 2018

Vzteklina (Rabies) is a Czech crime thriller television series broadcast on Czech Television in 2018. The series was filmed in 2017 in the village of Dolejší Těšov and directed by Tomáš Bařina.

== Plot ==
Animals infected with rabies start to appear in the area around the Šumava village of Bučiny. Virologist Pavel Rogl is sent to the area with task to find the cause of the situation. He oversees vaccinations and is also tasked with writing an expert report on a double murder.

== Cast ==
- Kryštof Hádek as virologist Pavel Rogl
- Johana Matoušková as Gabriela Burešová, daughter of the main suspect
- Gabriela Heclová as Táňa Burešová, younger daughter of the main suspect
- Igor Bareš as Václav Bureš, the main suspect
- Adéla Petřeková as Kateřina Roglová, journalist and Rogl's sister
- Petr Stach as MUDr. Tomáš Polota, ex-husband of Gabriela Burešová
- Jan Vlasák as MUDr. Oldřich Vacek, local doctor
- Leoš Noha as major Rudolf Valenta, policeman
- Filip Čapka as first lieutenant Luděk Cílek, policeman
- Pavla Beretová as first lieutenant Klára Pleslová, policewoman
- Eva Leinweberová as MUDr. Lenka Niklová, policejní patoložka
- Števo Capko as lieutenant Brož, policeman
- Jan Novotný as Alois Pudil
