= Jan Antonín Duchoslav =

Czech actor

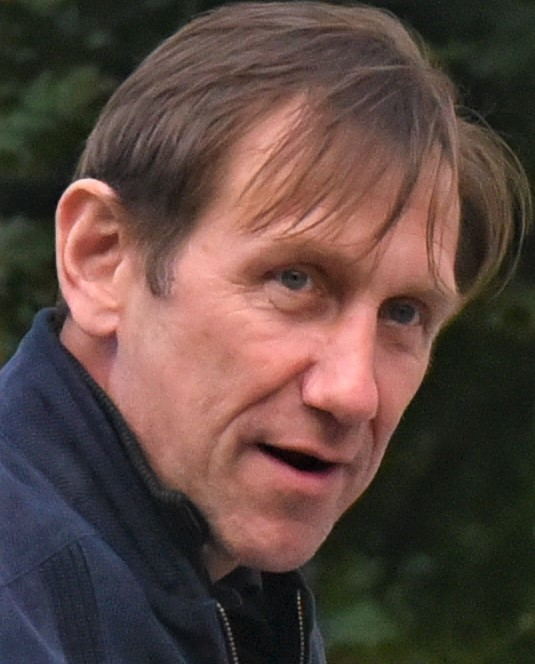
- by David Sedlecký, 2018
- Born: 1 May 1965 (age 61); Prague, Czechoslovakia
- Occupation: Actor
- Years active: 1982–present

Jan Antonín Duchoslav (born 1 May 1965, Prague) is a Czech actor.

== Filmography ==
- 1982 – Sněženky a machři
- 1983 – Už mu to začalo, Sladké starosti
- 1984 – Láska z pasáže, Malý vodní had, Třetí patro
- Non plus Ultras
- 2006 – Rafťáci
- 2009 – 2Bobule
- 2012 – Můj vysvlečenej deník
