= Mamon (TV series) =

Czech television series

- Country of origin: Czech Republic
- No. of episodes: 6

Production
- Running time: 60 minutes

Original release
- Network: HBO Europe
- Release: October 25 – November 2, 2015

Mamon is a Czech thriller drama television series, that premiered on HBO Europe in October 2015. It was filmed by director Vladimír Michálek with cameraman Martin Štrba based on a script by Štefan Titka based on a Norwegian novel of the same name. It premiered from 25 October to 29 November 2015.

The series won the Czech Lion in the category of best drama TV series.

The main slogan of the series is the sentence You will find the truth between the lines.

== Cast ==
- Matěj Hádek as Petr Vlček
- Eva Leimbergerová as Stella Němečková
- Michal Dlouhý as Daniel Vlček
- Gabriela Míčová as Eva Vlčková
- Daniel Tůma as Michal Vlček
- Pavlína Štorková as Journalist Marie Králová
- Tereza Hofová as prosecutor Jana Skálová
- Igor Bareš as Aleš Toman
- Petr Halberstadt as cleaner
- Jiří Vyorálek as Samuel Pleva
- Igor Ondříček as Ing. Karel Zpěváček
- Kateřina Burianová as Anna Vlčková
- Vladimír Krátký as Antonín Vlček
- Ondřej Malý as minister Theodor Horváth
- Petra Jungmanová as Ivona Palcová
- Petr Motloch as Jan Šrámek st.
- Stanislav Gerstner as investigator Stach
- Pavel Gajdoš as Břetislav Málek
- Jan Novotný as director Doubrava
- Martin Sitta as Josef Uher
- Jakub Koudela as Jan Šrámek ml.
