= Veronika Freimanová =

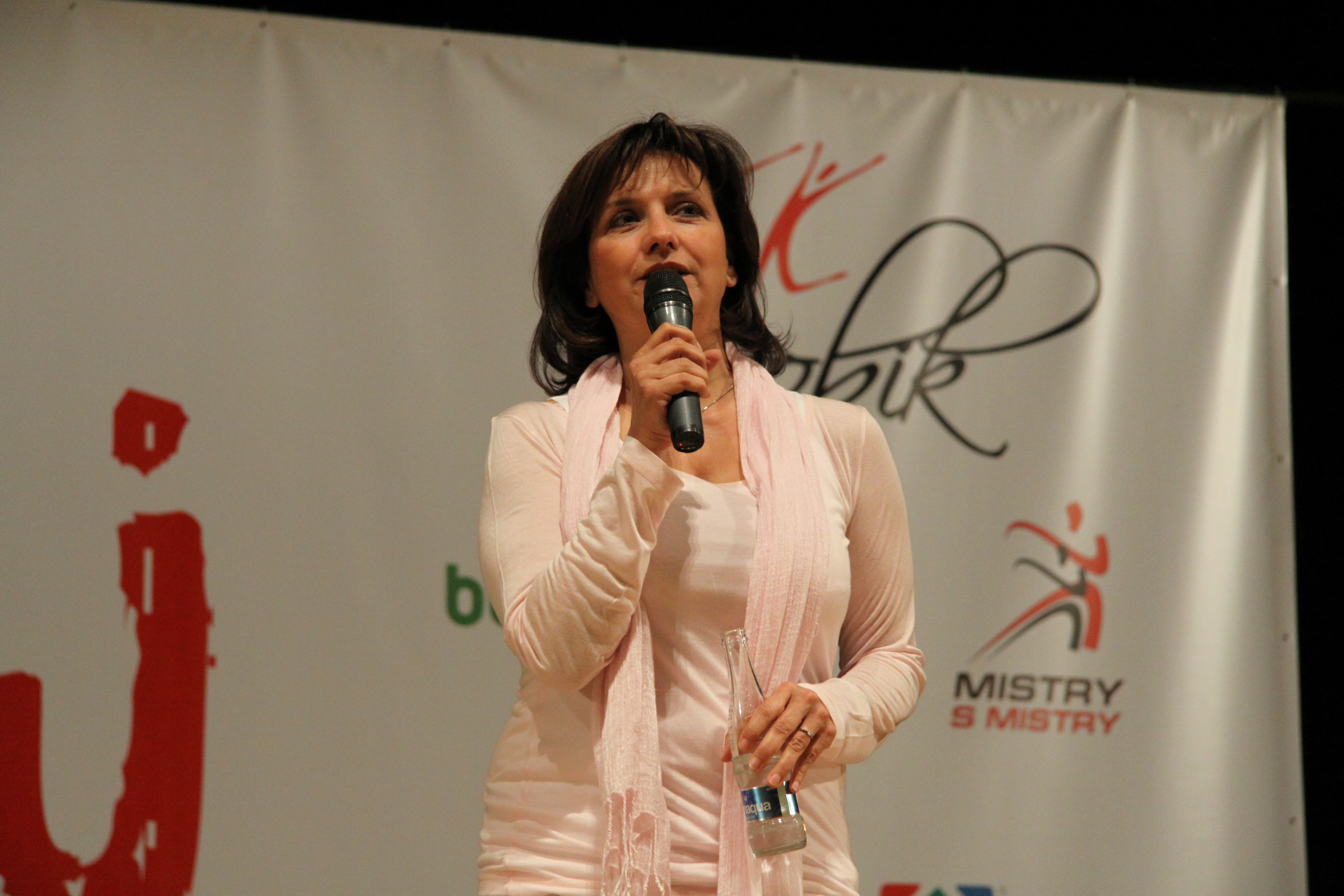
- Veronika Freimanová in 2011
- Born: 24 September 1955 (age 70); Prague, Czechoslovakia (now Czech Republic)
- Occupation: Actress
- Years active: 1973–present
- Spouses: Jaroslav Brabec (before 2008); Vladimír Bouček (m. 2013)
- Children: 2

Veronika Freimanová (born 24 September 1955 in Prague) is a Czech stage, television and film actress. Freimanová is a graduate of Prague Conservatory and currently acts at Divadlo Bez zábradlí.

== Filmography ==
- Sněženky a machři (1983)
- Snowboarďáci (2004)
- Rafťáci (2006)
- Vyprávěj (2012)
