= Nightline (film) =

- Directed by: Robert Sedláček
- Starring: Karel Roden
- Distributed by: Bontonfilm
- Release date: 28 April 2022
- Running time: 95 minutes
- Country: Czech Republic
- Language: Czech
- Box office: 2,609,255 CZK

Nightline (Czech: Promlčeno literally Time-barred) is a 2022 Czech crime thriller film directed by Robert Sedláček. It stars Karel Roden. Inspired by real events - the motive is a time-barred murder - the film is set in the time of its creation. The screenplay was written by Robert Sedláček, who also directed it. Filming took place in 2020 mainly in Prague at night, and partly in the American Malibu. It is the first film in Czech cinematography that takes place almost in real time. It was presented to journalists on 26 April 2022; the premiere, originally planned for February 2021, took place on April 28 of the following year due to the closure of cinemas due to measures against the coronavirus epidemic.

== Cast ==
- Karel Roden as Radek
- Barbora Bočková as Eva Sommerová
- Igor Bareš
- Vladimír Kratina
- Karel Jirák as himself
- Denisa Barešová as Eliška Vachková
- Vilma Cibulková as matka Elišky
- Michal Holán as Eva's colleague
- Michal Dalecký as Eva's colleague
- Eva Decastelo as Receptionist
- Jiří Chum as Czech Radio moderator
- Ernesto Čekan

== Production ==
Jiří Tuček, once the youngest producer in the history of a Czech feature film, became the producer of Promlčeno. The film had a specific background. The director Mirek Veselý started filming the original Promlčeno, but his producers did not finish filming in the end and handed over the idea for a new filming to Donart production. Shooting concluded on 2 October 2020.

== Distribution ==
The main distribution channel of the film became the network of Czech cinemas and multiplexes distributed by Bontonfilm; Prima received the exclusive license to broadcast the film on television.

== Music ==
The music for Nightline was commissioned by independent bands and creators Michal Rataj, Oskar Török and Luboš Soukup; the sound was provided by Robert Slezák.
