= Jiří Helekal =

Czech singer

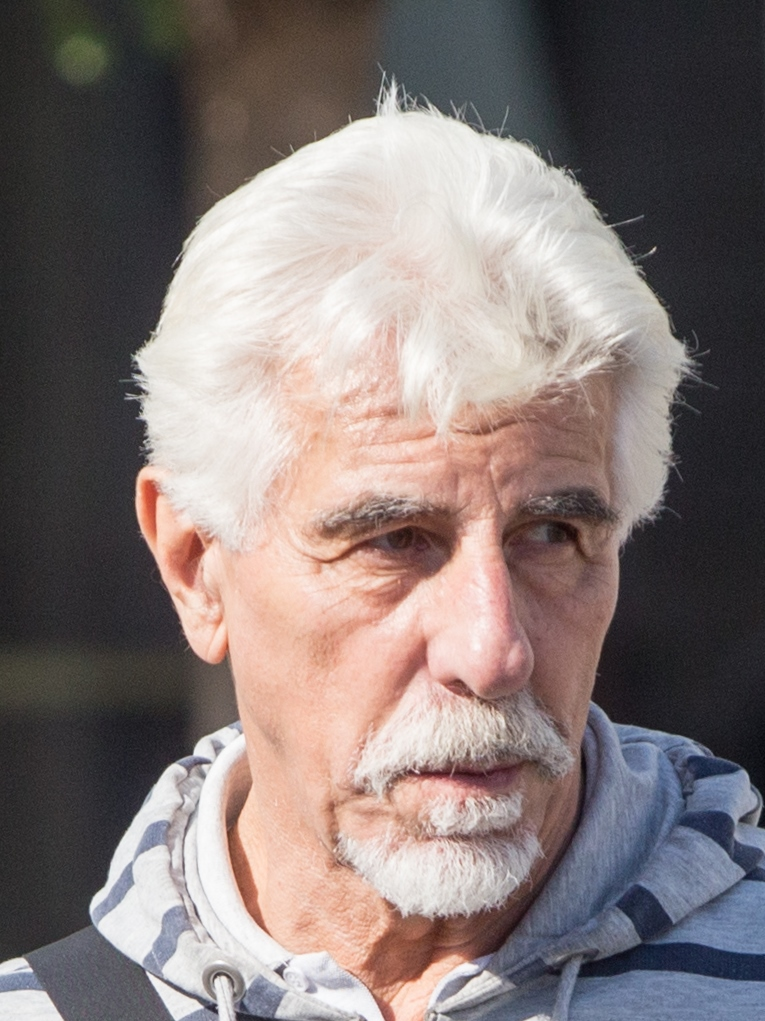
- Born: February 13, 1947; Prague, Czechoslovakia
- Occupation: Singer

Jiří Helekal (born 13 February 1947, in Prague) is a Czech singer and musician.
