= Michal Suchánek (Czech actor) =

Czech actor, moderator and comedian (born 1965)

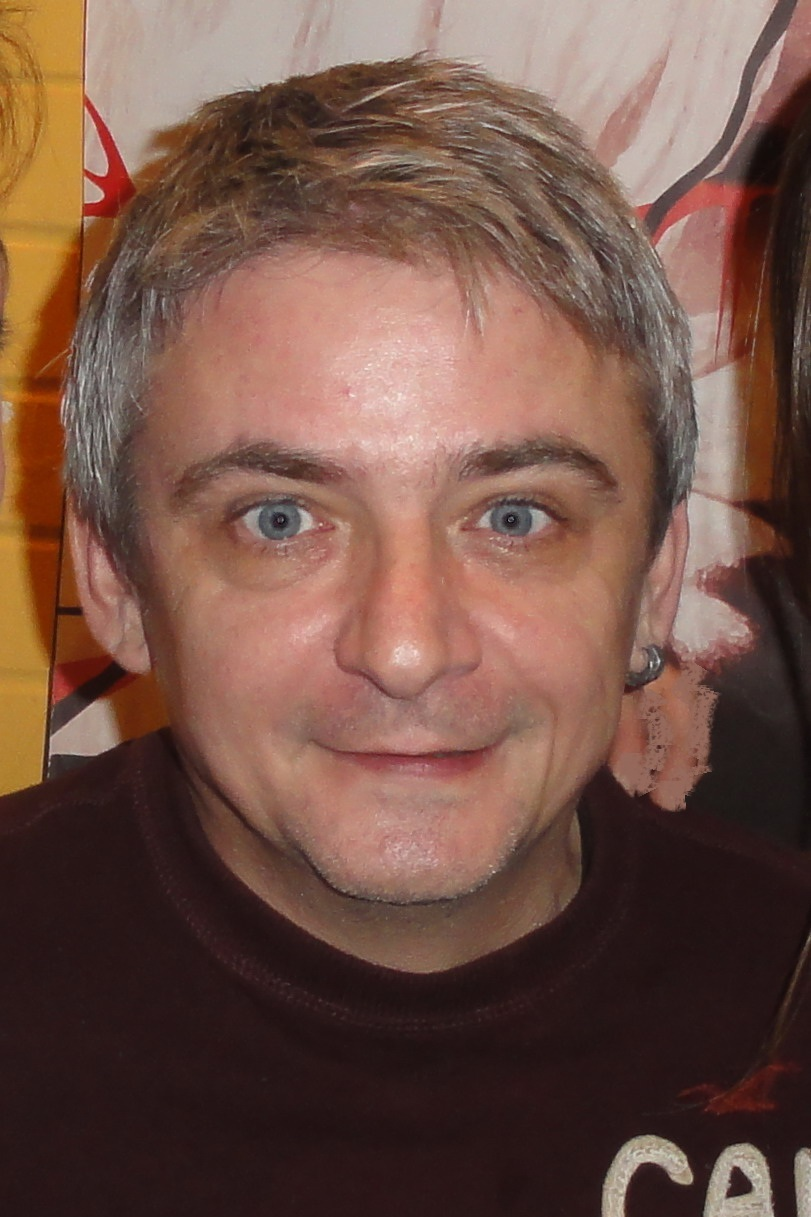
- Michal Suchánek
- Born: 29 July 1965 (age 60); Jičín, Czechoslovakia
- Occupations: Actor, comedian, screenwriter
- Years active: 1974–present

Michal Suchánek (born 29 July 1965) is a Czech actor, moderator and comedian. He is the writer and actor in the popular Czech and Slovak TV show Tele Tele along with his friend Richard Genzer.

Suchánek was born in Jičín, but grew in Sobotka. He became a child actor at age 9. He later studied at Prague Conservatory. He acted in many famous theaters, like Národní divadlo and Činoherní klub and in number of films.

After Tele Tele the popular television show with great popularity in Czech Republic and Slovakia, he co-wrote with Genzer many other shows as Mr. GS and Máš minutu!. He is also one of the actors in the Czech version of Partička.

== Filmography ==
- 2018: Pepa
- 2011: O mé rodině a jiných mrtvolách (TV seriál)
- 2008: Sněženky a machři po 25 letech
- 2007: Angelika (divadelní záznam)
- 2006: Prachy dělaj člověka
- 2005: Tři mušketýři (divadelní záznam)
- 2005: Ulice (TV seriál)
- 2004: Tři
- 2000: Pra pra pra (TV seriál)
- 1999: Agáta
- 1999: Policajti z předměstí (TV seriál)
- 1996: Dvě z policejní brašny (TV film)
- 1996: Hospoda (TV seriál)
- 1996: Na hraně (TV seriál)
- 1996: O sirotkovi z Radhoště (TV film)
- 1995: Byl jednou jeden polda
- 1995: Přijeď si pro mě, tady straší (TV film)
- 1995: Šaty dělají mrtvolu (TV film)
- 1994: Bylo nás pět (TV seriál)
- 1994: Ještě větší blbec, než jsme doufali
- 1993: Arabela se vrací aneb Rumburak králem Říše pohádek (TV seriál)
- 1993: Zvláštní schopnosti (TV film)
- 1992: Ať ten kůň mlčí! (TV film)
- 1992: Kocourkov (TV film)
- 1992: Osvětová přednáška v Suché Vrbici (TV film)
- 1991: Panenka s porcelánovou hlavičkou (TV film)
- 1991: Tankový prapor
- 1991: Území bílých králů (TV seriál)
- 1990: Jak s Kubou šili všichni čerti (TV film)
- 1990: Pohádky pod lupou (TV seriál)
- 1990: Pražákům, těm je hej
- 1990: Zvonokosy (TV film)
- 1989: Poklad rytíře Miloty
- 1989: Příběh '88
- 1989: Případ pro zvláštní skupinu (TV seriál)
- 1989: Strom pohádek: Pasáček a císařova dcera (TV film)
- 1988: Láska na inzerát (TV film)
- 1988: Rozsudky soudce Ooky (TV film)
- 1988: Sedm hladových
- 1988: Ten tretí (TV film)
- 1988: Zlatá flétna (TV film)
- 1987: Modré kráľovstvo (TV film)
- 1987: Proč?
- 1987: Přízrak (TV film)
- 1987: Strom pohádek (TV seriál)
- 1987: Sychravé království (TV film)
- 1987: Zírej, holube! (TV film)
- 1986: Klobouk, měšec a láska (TV film)
- 1986: Krajina s nábytkem
- 1986: Smutné radosti (TV film)
- 1986: Velká filmová loupež
- 1985: Dva t. č. v zel. hl. dvě veselé nekuř. (TV film)
- 1985: Jako jed
- 1985: Náušnice (TV film)
- 1985: Třetí patro (TV seriál)
- 1985: Večeře se šampaňským (TV film)
- 1984: Bambinot (TV seriál)
- 1984: Rozprávky pätnástich sestier (TV seriál)
- 1984: Sanitka (TV seriál)
- 1983: Anička Jurkovičová (TV film)
- 1983: Hrátky (TV film)
- 1983: Stav ztroskotání
- 1982: Farba tvojich očí (TV film)
- 1982: O smelom krajčírikovi (TV film)
- 1982: Sněženky a machři
- 1981: Katera (TV film)
- 1980: Jen si tak trochu písknout
- 1978: Spadla z nebe (TV seriál)
- 1976: Šťastné a veselé (TV film)
- 1976: Terezu bych kvůli žádné holce neopustil
- 1975: Brána k domovu (TV film)
- 1974: Pozdní léto (TV film)
- 1974: Vodník a Zuzana (TV film)
