= Maxim Havlíček =

Czech-American painter

- Born: Prague
- Education: Hellichovka
- Occupation: Artist
- Website: www.maximdtla.com

Maxim Havlíček, known by his artist name stylized as MAXIM, is a Czech-American painter.

== Early life ==
Maxim Havlíček was born in Prague. He attended the graphic design school Hellichovka in Prague, and then began a career in advertising. He left the Czech Republic in the late 1990s, moving to San Francisco.

== Art ==
Maxim Havlíček working in his Downtown Los Angeles atelier in 2019

Over the next two decades he moved to Chicago, and then to Los Angeles. Since his move to LA in 2011 he has worked as a fine arts painter, using canvas and paint, as well as mixed-medium. His work has been described as using sculpture techniques on canvas. Over his career he has exhibited both in solo shows and in group shows. In 2018 Havlíček's work was the subject of a solo exhibition in Prague entitled The Alchemist, which was inspired by the book of the same name. A limited edition line of clothing as released as a part of the exhibition. Havlíček has also worked in film as an editor, producer, and in visual effects. He himself is also the subject of the short documentary No Time Left: The Impact of a Communist Upbringing. In 2019 Havlíček's solo exhibition Time Traveller was shown at the Character Studio in Prague. Works in the collection were inspired by the ambivalence of his early life in the Czech Republic and his adult life in the United States.

== Personal life ==
Havlíček has a twin brother, Karel, who is a film music composer and DJ.
