= Jiří Macháně =

Czech cinematographer (1940–2023)

- Born: 27 December 1940; Nové Město nad Metují, Protectorate of Bohemia and Moravia
- Died: 3 February 2023 (aged 82); Prague, Czech Republic

Jiří Macháně (27 December 1940 – 20 January 2023) was a Czech cinematographer.

== Life and career ==
Born in Nové Město nad Metují, Macháně graduated in cinematography at FAMU in 1964 and started working as a cameraman with the Czechoslovak Army Film production company. He made his debut as a cinematographer in 1969, in Jan Schmidt's Czech-Soviet co-production The Lanfier Colony.

Macháně's filmography consists of over 50 films and a number of television series. He is best known for his association with director Juraj Herz, with whom he worked in 15 films. His last work was the mystery-horror film T.M.A., released in 2009. In 2015, he received the Lifetime Achievement Award of the Association of Czech Cinematographers. He died on 20 January 2023, at the age of 82.
