= List of Czech films of the 1960s =

This is a list of Czechoslovak films in the Czech language of the 1960s.

Title	Director	Cast	Genre	Notes
1960
Higher Principle (Vyšší princip)	Jiří Krejčík	František Smolík, Jana Brejchová, Ivan Mistrík	Drama, War	
Konec cesty	Miroslav Cikán			
The White Dove (Holubice	František Vláčil	Kateřina Irmanovová, Karel Smyczek	Drama	
Laundry Boy (Práče)	Karel Kachyňa		Drama, War	
Tragic Monday (Zlé pondělí)	Milan Vošmik	František Maxián, Karel Smyczek	Drama	
Přežil jsem svou smrt	Vojtěch Jasný	František Peterka, Jiří Sovák	Drama, War	
Romeo, Juliet and Darkness (Romeo, Julia a tma)	Jiří Weiss	Ivan Mistrík, Daniela Smutná	Drama	
1961
Každá koruna dobrá	Zbyněk Brynych		Comedy	
Kde alibi nestačí	Vladimír Čech		Crime	
Kohout plaší smrt	Vladimír Čech		Drama	
Man in Outer Space (Muž z prvního století)	Oldřich Lipský	Miloš Kopecký, Radovan Lukavský	Sci-fi	Entered into the 1962 Cannes Film Festival
Fetters (Pouta)	Karel Kachyňa		Drama	Entered into the 2nd Moscow International Film Festival
June days (Červnové dny)	Antonín Kachlík	Jirí Bednár, Zuzana Schnöblingová, Josef Langmiler	Drama	
1962
Klaun Ferdinand a raketa			Sci-Fi, Family	
The Devil's Trap (Ďáblova past)	František Vláčil	Vítězslav Vejražka, Miroslav Macháček, Vít Olmer	Drama	
1963
The Cassandra Cat (Až přijde kocour)	Vojtěch Jasný	Jan Werich, Vlastimil Brodský, Jiří Sovák	Comedy, Drama	Entered into the 1963 Cannes Film Festival - Special Jury Prize
Pršelo jim štěstí	Antonín Kachlík		Drama	
Ikarie XB-1	Jindřich Polák	Zdeněk Štěpánek, Radovan Lukavský, Dana Medřická	Sci-fi	
The King of Kings (Král Králů)	Martin Frič		Comedy	
The Cry (Křik)	Jaromil Jireš	Josef Abrhám	Drama	Entered into the 1964 Cannes Film Festival
Audition (Konkurs)	Miloš Forman	Jan Vostrčil, Vladimír Pucholt	Drama	
Death Is Called Engelchen Smrt si říká Engelchen	Ján Kadár, Elmar Klos		Drama	Entered into the 3rd Moscow International Film Festival
Závrať	Karel Kachyňa		Drama	
1964
Diamonds of the Night (Démanty noci)	Jan Němec	Ladislav Janský, Antonín Kumbera	Drama	
Kdyby tisíc klarinetů	Ján Roháč, Vladimír Svitáček	Jana Brejchová, Waldemar Matuška	Musical, Comedy	
Atentát	Jiří Sequens	Luděk Munzar, Radoslav Brzobohatý	Drama, War	Entered into the 4th Moscow International Film Festival
Black Peter (Černý Petr)	Miloš Forman	Ladislav Jakim, Vladimír Pucholt, Jan Vostrčil	Comedy, Drama	
The Fifth Horseman Is Fear (A pátý jezdec je strach)	Zbyněk Brynych	Miroslav Machaček	Drama, War	
Lemonade Joe (Limonádový Joe)	Oldřich Lipský	Karel Fiala, Miloš Kopecký, Květa Fialová, Olga Schoberová	Comedy, Western	
Hall Nurse (Kdy brečí muži)	Jan Valášek	Ivo Pelant, Jiřina Jirásková, Božena Böhmová, Aleš Ondrouch, Zuzana Schnöblingová	Drama	
1965
Intimate Lighting (Intimní osvětlení)	Ivan Passer	Zdenek Bezusek, Karel Blazek, Miroslav Cvrk	Comedy, Drama	
Loves of a Blonde (Lásky jedné plavovlásky)	Miloš Forman	Hana Brejchová, Vladimír Pucholt, Josef Šebánek	Comedy, Drama	Academy Award for Best Foreign Language Film nominee, Golden Globe for Best Foreign Language Film nominee
90 Degrees in the Shade (Třicet jedna ve stínu)	Jiří Weiss	Anne Heywood, James Booth	Crime, Drama	Co-production with United Kingdom
The Shop on Main Street (Obchod na korze)	Ján Kádár, Elmar Klos	Ida Kamińska, Jozef Kroner	Drama	Cannes Film Festival - Jury Prize (Cannes Film Festival), Special Jury Prize for Kaminská and Kroner; Academy Award for Best Foreign Language Film
White Lady (Bílá paní)	Zdeněk Podskalský	Irena Kačírková, Vlastimil Brodský	Comedy	
Long Live the Republic! (Ať žije Republika)	Karel Kachyňa	Frank Argus, Josef Bárta, Eduard Bredun	Drama	
1966
Who Wants to Kill Jessie? (Kdo chce zabít Jessii?)	Oldřich Lipský	Jiří Sovák, Dana Medřická, Olga Schoberová	Comedy, Sci-fi	
Daisies (Sedmikrásky)	Vera Chytilová	Ivana Karbanová, Jitka Cerhová	Comedy	
Closely Watched Trains (Ostře sledované vlaky)	Jiří Menzel	Václav Neckář, Josef Somr	Drama, War	Academy Award for Best Foreign Language Film, Golden Globe for Best Foreign Language Film nominee
The Pipes (Dýmky)	Vojtěch Jasný		Comedy	Entered into the 1966 Cannes Film Festival
A Report on the Party and the Guests (O slavnosti a hostech)	Jan Němec		Drama	
1967
Pension pro svobodné pány	Jiří Krejčík	Josef Abrhám, Iva Janžurová, Jiří Hrzán	Comedy	
Romance for Bugle (Romance pro křídlovku)	Otakar Vávra	Zuzana Cikánová, Jaromír Hanzlík	Romance, Drama	Entered into the 5th Moscow International Film Festival
The Stolen Airship (Ukradená vzducholoď)	Karel Zeman		Fantasy	
Valley of the Bees (Údolí včel)	František Vláčil	Petr Čepek, Jan Kačer	Drama, History	
Svatba jako řemen	Jiří Krejčík	Iva Janžurová, Jiří Hrzán, Vladimír Pucholt, Jan Vostrčil	Comedy	
Marketa Lazarová	František Vláčil	Magda Vašáryová, Josef Kemr	Drama, History	
The Firemen's Ball (Hoří, má panenko)	Miloš Forman	Josef Šebánek	Comedy	Academy Award for Best Foreign Language Film nominee
Hotel for Strangers (Hotel pro cizince)	Antonín Máša		Comedy	Entered into the 1967 Cannes Film Festival
1968
Sky Riders (Nebeští jezdci)	Jindřich Polák	Jiří Bednář, Jiří Hrzán	Drama, War	
Capricious Summer (Rozmarné léto)	Jiří Menzel		Comedy	
All My Compatriots (Všichni dobří rodáci)	Vojtěch Jasný	Vlastimil Brodský, Radoslav Brzobohatý, Vladimír Menšík	Drama	Cannes Film Festival - Special Jury Prize and Prize for best director winner
1969
Adelheid	František Vláčil	Petr Čepek, Emma Černá	Drama	
The Cremator (Spalovač mrtvol)	Juraj Herz	Rudolf Hrušínský	Drama, Comedy, Horror	
Šíleně smutná princezna	Bořivoj Zeman	Václav Neckář, Helena Vondráčková	Fairy-tale, Musical	
Witchhammer (Kladivo na čarodějnice)	Otakar Vávra	Elo Romančík, Vladimír Šmeral, Soňa Valentová	Drama, History	
Utrpení mladého Boháčka	František Filip	Pavel Landovský, Regina Rázlová	Comedy	
Larks on a String (Skřivánci na niti)	Jiří Menzel	Václav Neckář, Naďa Urbánková, Rudolf Hrušínský	Drama, Comedy	The film had a premiere in 1990. The Golden Bear winner at the 40th Berlin International Film Festival
End of a Priest (Farářův konec)	Evald Schorm		Drama, Comedy	Entered into the 1969 Cannes Film Festival
Flirt se slečnou Stříbrnou	Václav Gajer		Drama	
The Joke (Žert)	Jaromil Jireš	Josef Somr, Jana Dítětová, Luděk Munzar	Drama, Comedy	Banned following initial release
Směšný pán	Karel Kachyňa		Drama	
Světáci	Zdeněk Podskalský		Comedy	
The Lanfier Colony (Kolonie Lanfieri)	Jan Schmidt		Adventure film	Entered into the 6th Moscow International Film Festival
