= List of Czech films of the 1970s =

A List of Czech films of the 1970s.

Title	Director	Cast	Genre	Notes
1970
Witchhammer	Otakar Vávra	Elo Romančík	drama	
Čtyři vraždy stačí, drahoušku (Four Murders is enough, Honey)	Oldřich Lipský	Lubomír Lipský, Iva Janžurová, Jiřina Bohdalová, Marie Rosůlková	comics parody	there are sequences of comics pictures by Kája Saudek in that film
Ecce homo Homolka	Jaroslav Papoušek	Helena Růžičková, Josef Šebánek	comedy	
Eden and After	Alain Robbe-Grillet		Horror	Entered into the 20th Berlin International Film Festival
Fruit of Paradise (Ovoce stromů rajských jíme)	Věra Chytilová	Karel Novák, Jitka Nováková	Drama	Entered into the 1970 Cannes Film Festival
The Last Act of Martin Weston	Michael Jacot	Jon Granik, Nuala Fitzgerald, Milena Dvorská, Al Waxman	Drama	Canadian-Czech coproduction
Ucho	Karel Kachyňa	Jiřina Bohdalová, Radoslav Brzobohatý	drama	the film was banned by communist censorship before its staging in 1969, so the premiere was in 1990
Valerie and Her Week of Wonders (Valerie a tyden divu)	Jaromil Jires	Jaroslava Schallerová, Helena Anyžková	fairy tale, horror	
Už zase skáču přes kaluže (I Can Jump Puddles)	Karel Kachyňa	Vladimír Dlouhý	Family film	according to the 1955 novel by Alan Marshall
1971
The Key	Vladimír Čech		War drama	Entered into the 7th Moscow International Film Festival
Oil Lamps (Petrolejové lampy)	Juraj Herz		Drama	Entered into the 1972 Cannes Film Festival
Pane, vy jste vdova! (You are a Widow, sir!)	Václav Vorlíček	Jiří Hrzán, Iva Janžurová, Jiří Sovák, Olga Schoberová	sci-fi comedy	
Ženy v ofsajdu			Comedy	
1972
Akce Bororo (Mission Bororo)	Otakar Fuka	Svatopluk Matyáš, Božidara Turzonovová, Vlastimil Brodský	sci-fi	
Dívka na koštěti	Václav Vorlíček	Petra Černocká, Jan Hrušínský	fantasy comedy	
Morgiana	Juraj Herz	Iva Janžurová, Petr Čepek	drama	
1973
Days of Betrayal	Otakar Vávra		Historical drama	Entered into the 8th Moscow International Film Festival
Fantastic Planet	René Laloux		Animated science fiction film	Coproduction with France
Noc na Karlštejně	Zdeněk Podskalský	Jana Brejchová, Vlastimil Brodský	musical comedy	music by Karel Svoboda
Three Wishes for Cinderella	Václav Vorlíček	Libuše Šafránková, Pavel Trávníček	fairy-tale	
Vysoká modrá zed	Vladimír Čech			Set in 1951
1974
Jáchyme, hoď ho do stroje!	Oldřich Lipský	Luděk Sobota, Marta Vančurová	comedy	written by Ladislav Smoljak & Zdeněk Svěrák, founders of "Jára Cimrman theatre"
Kdo hledá zlaté dno	Jiří Menzel		Drama	Entered into the 25th Berlin International Film Festival
1975
Jacob the Liar	Frank Beyer	Vlastimil Brodský	War drama	Czech-German co-production
My Brother Has a Cute Brother	Stanislav Strnad		Comedy	Entered into the 9th Moscow International Film Festival
Páni kluci		Iva Janžurová	Family film	
Případ mrtvého muže	Dusan Klein		Crime, Drama	Set in 1955
Romance za korunu	Zbyněk Brynych		Romance	
1976
Bouřlivé vino (Stormy Wine)	Václav Vorlícek		Comedy	Set in 1968
Circus in the Circus (Cirkus v cirkuse)	Oldřich Lipský		Comedy	
Day for My Love	Juraj Herz		Drama	Entered into the 27th Berlin International Film Festival
Holka na zabití	Juraj Herz		Crime	
Hra o jablko	Věra Chytilová	Jiří Menzel, Evelyna Steimarová, Dagmar Bláhová	tragicomedy	
Léto s kovbojem (Summer with Cowboy)	Ivo Novák	Daniela Kolářová, Jaromír Hanzlík, Oldřich Vízner	comedy	
Marečku, podejte mi pero!	Oldřich Lipský	Jiří Sovák, Jiří Schmitzer, Josef Abrhám, Josef Kemr, Iva Janžurová, Václav Lohniský	comedy	written by Ladislav Smoljak & Zdeněk Svěrák
Na samotě u lesa (weekend house into hamlet)	Jiří Menzel	Zdeněk Svěrák, Daniela Kolářová, Josef Kemr, Naďa Urbánková	comedy	written by Ladislav Smoljak & Zdeněk Svěrák
One Silver Piece	Jaroslav Balík		Drama	
Zrcadlo pro Kristýnu	Jirí Svoboda		Drama	
1977
Což takhle dát si špenát	Václav Vorlíček	Jiří Sovák, Vladimír Menšík	sci-fi comedy	
Dinner for Adele aka Nick Carter in Prague (Adéla ještě nevečeřela)	Oldřich Lipský	Michal Dočolomanský, Naďa Konvalinková, Miloš Kopecký, Rudolf Hrušínský	black comedy	Entered into the 1978 Academy Award for Best Foreign Language Film
Do Be Quick	Stanislav Strnad		Drama	Entered into the 10th Moscow International Film Festival
Long Live Ghosts!	Oldřich Lipský	Jiří Procházka, Dana Vávrová	Fantasy comedy	
Zítra vstanu a opařím se čajem	Jindřich Polák	Petr Kostka, Jiří Sovák, Vladimír Menšík, Vlastimil Brodský	sci-fi comedy	
1978
Hop – a je tu lidoop	Milan Muchna	Josef Kemr	Comedy	
1979
Kulový blesk	Ladislav Smoljak	Josef Abrhám, Rudolf Hrušínský	comedy	written by Ladislav Smoljak & Zdeněk Svěrák
Love Between the Raindrops	Karel Kachyňa		Romantic comedy	
Panelstory	Věra Chytilová		Comedy	
Those Wonderful Men with a Crank (Báječní muži s klikou)	Jiří Menzel		Comedy	Entered into the 1979 Academy Award for Best Foreign Language Film
The Young Man and Moby Dick	Jaromil Jireš		Drama	Entered into the 11th Moscow International Film Festival
