= Today for the Last Time =

1958 film

- Directed by: Martin Frič
- Written by: Josef Neuberg; František Vlček; Martin Frič
- Starring: Zdeněk Štěpánek
- Cinematography: Jaroslav Tuzar
- Edited by: Jan Kohout
- Release date: 13 December 1958
- Running time: 99 minutes
- Country: Czechoslovakia
- Language: Czech

Today for the Last Time (Czech: Dnes naposled) is a 1958 Czech drama film directed by Martin Frič.

== Cast ==
- Zdeněk Štěpánek as ing. Dada
- Vladimír Ráž as Masek
- Bela Jurdová as Masková
- Vladimír Menšík as Kroc
- Antonie Hegerlíková as Dandová
- Eva Océnasová as Jirina Dandová
- Luděk Munzar as Snoubenec jinny
- Václav Tomsovský as Láda Danda
- Irena Kacírková as Magda Reháková
- Vlastimil Brodský as Starozitník
- František Smolík as Taupe
- Jiří Sovák as Zemánek
- Jaroslav Mareš as Rendl
- Vera Vachová as Venturová
- Václav Lohniský as Reditel
