= September Nights =

1957 film

- Directed by: Vojtěch Jasný
- Written by: Pavel Kohout; Vojtěch Jasný; Frank Daniel
- Cinematography: Jaroslav Kučera
- Music by: Svatopluk Havelka
- Release date: 1957
- Running time: 87 minutes
- Country: Czechoslovakia
- Language: Czech

September Nights (Czech: Zářijové noci) is a 1957 Czechoslovak film directed by Vojtěch Jasný.

== Cast ==
- Václav Lohniský
- Ladislav Pešek
- Stanislav Remunda
- Zdeněk Řehoř
- Jiří Vala
- Vladimír Menšík
- Josef Bláha
- Jiří Sovák
- Vlastimil Brodský
- Libuše Havelková
- Marie Tomášová
- Jaroslav Mareš
- Vladimír Brabec
- Jiřina Steimarová
- Miloš Vavruška
