= Petra Černocká =

Czech singer and actress

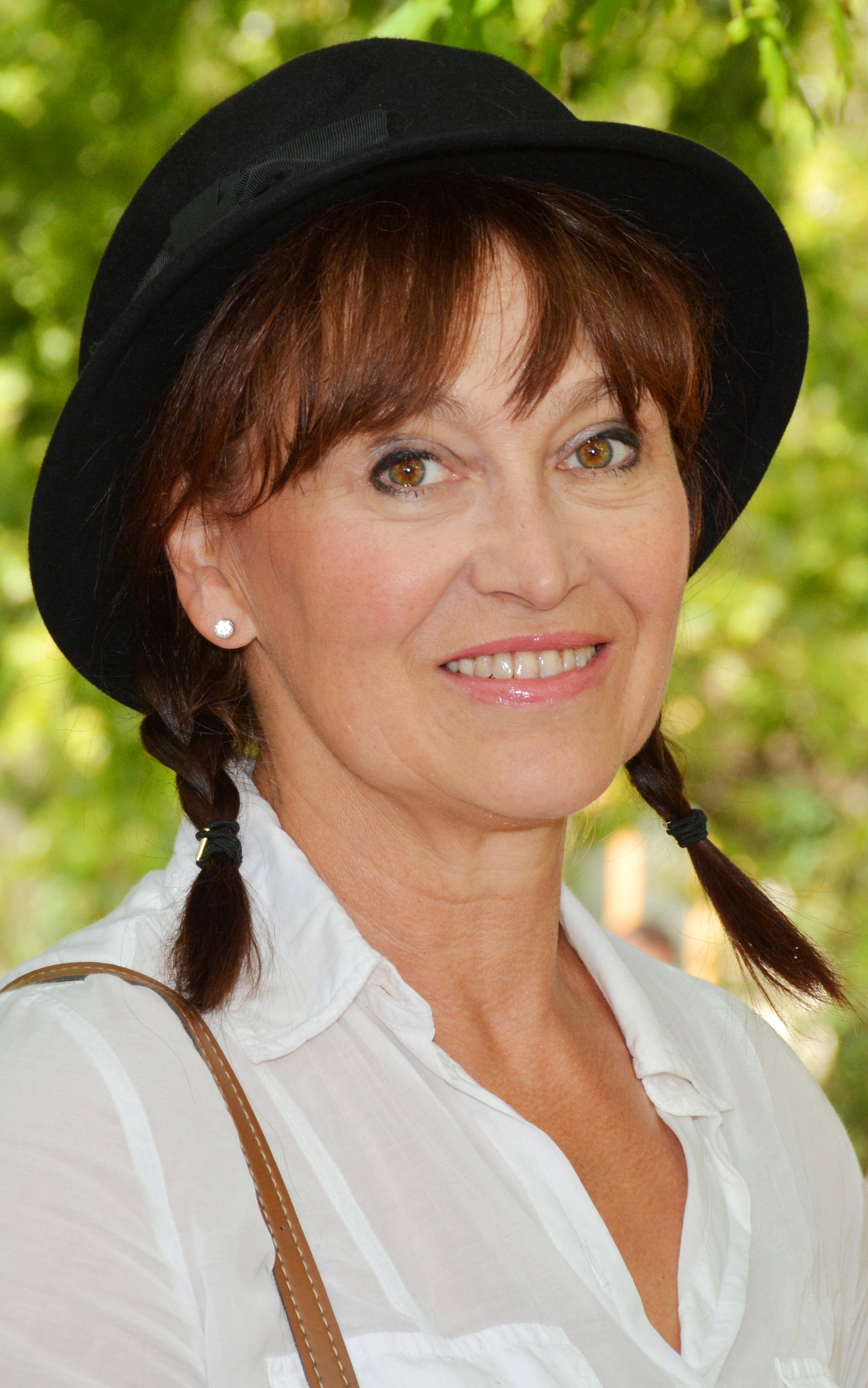
- Černocká in 2015.

Background information
- Born: 24 November 1949 (age 76); Prague, Czechoslovakia
- Origin: Czech Republic
- Occupation: Singer
- Years active: 1969–present
- Labels: Supraphon; Parlophone
- Website: petracernocka.cz

Petra Černocká (born 24 November 1949) is a Czech singer and actress. She is a cousin of Czech actor Vlastimil Brodský.

== Discography ==
=== Singles ===
- Jedou vozy / Nemám ráda citoslovce (SP 1971)
  - Jedou vozy (Jeda wozy kolorowe) [CD] ( ) Rabowski/M.Filípková
  - Nemám ráda citoslovce ( ) P.Hannig/E.Krečmar
  - (Ovečky)
- (Pastýři): Dám vše, co mám / Holka modrooká (SP 1971)
  - Dám vše, co mám (Get Me Some Help) ( ) Byl-Vangarde/P.Černocký
  - Holka modrooká ( ) P.Hannig/I.Havlů
  - (Ovečky 1)
- Saxana / Georgie (SP 1972)
  - Saxana [CD] ( ) A.Michajlov/P.Kopta
  - Georgie ( ) L.Farrington/P.Vrba
  - (Sbor L.Pánka 1)
- Líný štěstí / A láska musí se nám zdát (SP 1973)
  - Líný štěstí (Are You Really Leavin´ Baby) ( ) P.Deasy/E.Krečmar
  - A láska musí se nám zdát ( ) R.Pauls/J.Navrátil
  - (Kardinálové 1 – Strýci+Jezinky 2)
- (Kardinálové): Píseň na pět řádků... (SP 1973)
  - Píseň na pět řádků (Simple Song Of Freedom) [CD] ( ) B.Darin/P.Žák
  - Měsíc ví, co nevím já ( ) J.Havelka/P.Černocká
- sampler: 12xZdeněk Marat (LP 1973)
  - 3. Kde se můj milej toulá ( ) Z.Marat/Z.Borovec
  - (P.Černocká – Orch.K.Vlacha)
  - [Su 13 Jan 1406]
- Mám ráda růže / Táto a mámo (SP 1974)
  - Mám ráda růže [CD] ( ) V.Ivasjuk/V.Poštulka
  - Táto a mámo (Over and Over) ( ) D.Boone/M.Černý
  - (Kardinálové 2)
- (Kardinálové): Adié, řeknu Vám... (SP 1974)
  - Adié, řeknu Vám (Ma Chi é Che Choz´e) ( ) U.Napolitano/P.Černocká-J.A.Vaculík
  - Pouštím po vodě proutí [CD] ( ) Z.Merta/P.Žák
- (Kardinálové): Koukej přijít včas... (SP 1974)
  - Koukej přijít včas (In This World We Live In) ( ) Germani/P.Černocký
  - Teče voda, teče ( ) česká lid.
- (Kardinálové): Byl to zvláštní den... (SP 1974)
  - Byl to zvláštní den ( ) Z.Merta/P.Černocká
  - Rychlost má cenu zlata ( ) Z.Merta/P.Černocká
- Jarní kalendář / Pampeliška (SP 1975)
  - Jarní kalendář ( ) Z.Merta/P.Žák
  - Pampeliška ( ) P.Černocká
  - (Kardinálové 1 – Kantiléna 2)
- (Kardinálové): Narozeniny... (SP 1977)
  - Narozeniny (Snoopy Versus the Red Baron) ( ) P.Gernhard/P.Černocká
  - Zítra prý ti bude sedmnáct ( ) Z.Merta/P.Žák
- Mám své chyby / Střevíčky v rose (SP 1977)
  - Mám své chyby ( ) J.Vondráček/L.Borovcová
  - Střevíčky v rose [CD] ( ) Z.Merta/P.Žák
  - (Sbor L.Pánka 1 – Z.Merta+Kardinálové 2)
- (Kardinálové): Mississippi / Vítám tě, lásko (SP 1977)
  - Mississippi [CD] ( ) W.Theunissen/R.Filip
  - Vítám tě, lásko ( ) P.Černocká/P.Žák
- split: P.Černocká / J.Schelinger (SP 1978)
  - Jen se pousměj ( ) Z.Hanzlová
- (Kardinálové): Zpívání v dešti... (SP 1978)
  - Zpívání v dešti [CD] ( ) Z.Barták ml./J.Machek
  - Snění nad hlávkou zelí ( ) Z.Merta/Z.Kupková
  - (Z.Merta)
- (Kardinálové): Klub jachtový / Čekám (SP 1978)
  - Klub jachtový ( ) Z.Merta/P.Žák
  - Čekám [LP] ( ) Z.Merta/V.Kučera
- (Kardinálové): Cikánské štěstí... (SP 1981)
  - Cikánské štěstí ( ) P.Černocká/K.Fleisleberová
  - Páni, nemám zdání (To-li ješčo budět) ( ) J.Martynov/P.Černocká
- Milionář / Jsou krásy, které neumřou (SP 1984)
  - Milionář (Mister Businessman) ( ) Q.a M.de Angelis/P.Žák
  - Jsou krásy, které neumřou ( ) Z.Merta/P.Vrba
  - (Jezinky+Kardinálové 1 – Z.Merta 2)

=== LP albums ===
- 1986 Monitor – Supraphon (Petra Černocká a Kardinálové Zdeňka Merty)
- 1979 Ten kluk už dávno se mnou není – Supraphon
- 1975 Lidí se ptej – Supraphon

=== Studio albums ===
- 2009 Pop galerie Supraphon
- 2006 Souhvězdí střelce – Studio Michael
- 2006 Se mnou si píseň broukej (20× Petra Černocká) – Sony BMG
- 2005 Se mnou si píseň broukej (Story) – Universal music
- 1999 Lásku blízko mám – Venkow Records
- 1996 Saxana dětem – Happy Music
- 1996 Tennessee Whiskey – Happy Music
- 1994 Náklaďák – Presston

== Filmography ==
=== Films ===
Year	Film	Role
1969	Zabil jsem Einsteina, pánové!	Posluchačka
1972	Dívka na koštěti	Saxána
1974	Láska malovaná	Petra
1981	Otec	
1981	Zpěváci na kraji nemocnice	Petra
1984	Šach mat	
2008	Fredy a Zlatovláska	
2011	Saxána a Lexikon kouzel	Saxána
2014	Tři bratři	Sudička
2015	Stopy života – Derniéra	
2015	Andílek na nervy	Helena

=== Television ===
Year	Film	Role
1975	Nepokojná láska	
1988	Malé dějiny jedné rodiny	
1989	Případ pro zvláštní skupinu	
2007	Trapasy	
