= When the Woman Butts In =

1959 film

- Film poster
- Directed by: Zdeněk Podskalský
- Written by: František Daniel; Miloš Václav Kratochvíl
- Starring: Miroslav Horníček
- Cinematography: Jiří Šafář
- Release date: 1959
- Running time: 80 minutes
- Country: Czechoslovakia
- Language: Czech

When the Woman Butts In (Czech: Kam čert nemůže) is a 1959 Czechoslovak comedy film directed by Zdeněk Podskalský. It was entered into the 1960 Cannes Film Festival.

== Plot ==
The study of Dr Frantisek Prucha, who bears the nickname Faust, is located in Faust's House, now converted into a hospital. Dr Prucha is worn out from overwork, thus he does not even notice the interest he is generating among the surrounding women. One of them unexpectedly appears at one of his lectures. In her red dress, she looks like Mephistopheles dressed as a woman, and Faust privately calls her Mephistopheles. After he returns home, under strange circumstances, he finds her in his room, and he begins to think he is suffering from hallucinations.

== Cast ==
- Miroslav Horníček as Dr. Faust
- Jana Hlaváčová as Mefistofela
- Vlastimil Brodský as Borovička, Gastle Guide
- Jiří Sovák as Mayor Hatl
- Rudolf Hrušínský as Dr. Wagner
- Bohumil Bezouška as Driver
- Josef Příhoda as Man with Candle
