= Desire (1958 film) =

1958 film

- Directed by: Vojtěch Jasný
- Screenplay by: Vladimír Valenta; Vojtěch Jasný
- Starring: Vlastimil Brodský; Jana Brejchová
- Cinematography: Jaroslav Kučera
- Edited by: Jan Chaloupek
- Music by: Svatopluk Havelka
- Production company: Filmové studio Barrandov
- Distributed by: Ústřední půjčovna filmů
- Release date: 25 December 1958
- Country: Czechoslovakia
- Language: Czech

Desire (Czech: Touha) is a 1958 Czech anthology film directed by Vojtěch Jasný. It was entered into the 1959 Cannes Film Festival. The film consists of four stories – About a Boy Who Searched for the End of the World, People on Earth and Stars in the Skies, Anděla and Mum

== Cast ==
- Jan Jakeš as Joska Malina
- Václav Babka as Joska's father
- Věra Bublíková as Joska's mother
- Vlastimil Brodský as Novosad
- Jana Brejchová as Lenka
- Jiří Vala as Jan
- František Vnouček as Lenka's father
- Otto Šimánek as Brother-in-law
- Eva Blažková as Tonča
- Věra Tichánková as Anděla
- Václav Lohniský as Michal
- Zdeněk Kutil as Pavelka
- Vladimír Brabec as Municipal office employee
- Vladimír Menšík as Combine driver
