= Jaroslav Kučera =

Czech cinematographer

- Born: 6 August 1929; Prague, Czechoslovakia
- Died: 11 January 1991 (aged 61); Prague, Czechoslovakia
- Occupation: Cinematographer

Jaroslav Kučera (6 August 1929 – 11 January 1991) was a Czech cinematographer. He worked on many Czech New Wave movies.

== Life ==
He studied at FAMU in 1948–1952. He frequently worked with directors Vojtěch Jasný, Karel Kachyňa and his wife Věra Chytilová.

He received Technical Grand Prize at Cannes film festival for The Cassandra Cat.

Martin Frič called him "the most extraordinary cameraman this country [Czechoslovakia] has ever had."

He married director Věra Chytilová. Their daughter Tereza Kučerová (born 1964) is an art director. Their son Štěpán Kučera (born 1968) is a cinematographer.

== Selected filmography ==
- September Nights (1957)
- Desire (1958)
- I Survived Certain Death (1960)
- Pilgrimage to the Virgin Mary (1961)
- Deštivý den (1962)
- The Cassandra Cat (1963)
- Diamonds of the Night (1963)
- Cry (1964)
- A Boring Afternoon (1964)
- Pearls of the Deep (1965)
- Daisies (1966)
- Dita Saxová (1967)
- All My Compatriots (1968)
- Fruit of Paradise (1969)
- Psi a lidé (1971)
- Slaměný klobouk (1971)
- Morgiana (1972)
- A Night at Karlstein (1973)
- Jáchyme, hoď ho do stroje! (1974)
- The Little Mermaid (1976)
- Blue Eyed (1989)
