= How to Wake a Princess =

1978 Czechoslovak fantasy film

- Original Czech theatrical release poster
- Directed by: Václav Vorlíček
- Screenplay by: Bohumila Zelenková
- Based on: Sleeping Beauty by Charles Perrault and the Brothers Grimm
- Starring: Marie Horáková; Jan Hrušínský; Vladimír Menšík; Jiří Sovák; Milena Dvorská; Libuše Švormová
- Cinematography: Frantisek Uldrich
- Edited by: Miroslav Hájek
- Music by: Karel Svoboda
- Production company: Barrandov Studios
- Distributed by: Ústřední půjčovna filmů
- Release date: March 1, 1978 (Czechoslovakia)
- Running time: 83 minutes
- Country: Czechoslovakia
- Language: Czech

How to Wake a Princess (Czech: Jak se budí princezny) is a 1978 Czechoslovak fantasy film directed by Václav Vorlíček. It is based on the fairy tale Sleeping Beauty, in the versions collected by Charles Perrault and the Brothers Grimm.

== Plot ==
Witch Melánie, Queen Eliska's evil and envious sister, casts a terrible curse on her newborn niece. At the age of 17, Princess Ruzenka is asked in marriage by the arrogant and vain Prince Jirí, although she is in love with Jaroslav, the prince's younger brother. One day Melánie succeed to trick the princess into prickling herself with a thorny bouquet of roses, and the curse comes true. Ruzenka falls asleep and the whole court with her. Jaroslav will therefore have to overcome various obstacles helped by his faithful servant Matej, to enter the castle covered in thorns. The young man finally manages to reawaken the princess with a kiss.

== Cast ==
- Marie Horáková as Ruzenka
- Jan Hrušínský as Prince Jaroslav
- Vladimír Menšík as Matej
- Jiří Sovák as Ruzenka's Father
- Milena Dvorská as Queen Eliska
- Libuše Švormová as Melánie
- Marie Brozová as Melánie's Maid
- František Filipovský as Baron
- Oldřich Velen as King Vendelin
- Stella Zázvorková as Queen Anezka
- Jan Kraus as Prince Jirí
- Miloš Vavruška as Hunter
- Václav Postránecký as Jakub the Gardener
- Evelyna Steimarová as Miroslava

Marie Horáková and Oldřich Velen had all their lines dubbed by Naďa Konvalinková and Lubor Tokos respectively.

== Production ==
The exteriors were filmed at the Pernštejn, Křivoklát and Roštejn castles (Růženka's castle, close-ups of Růženka's castle and Jaroslav's castle respectively), and at the ruins of Orlík Castle (Melánie's house). The fight with the bear was filmed at Konopiště Castle.
