= Heinar Kipphardt =

German writer (1922–1982)

Heinar Kipphardt (8 March 1922 – 18 November 1982) was a German writer. He came to prominence with the documentary theatre during the 1960s. He is best known for In the Matter of J. Robert Oppenheimer, a dramatization of the Oppenheimer security hearing.

== Selected filmography ==
- In the Matter of J. Robert Oppenheimer (dir. Gerhard Klingenberg, 1964, TV film)
- Der Hund des Generals (dir. Franz Peter Wirth, 1964, TV film)
- The Joel Brand Story (dir. Franz Peter Wirth, 1964, TV film)
- Alexander März (dir. Vojtěch Jasný, 1976, TV film)
- Die Stühle des Herrn Szmil (dir. Vojtěch Jasný, 1979, TV film)
- Die Nacht, in der der Chef geschlachtet wurde (dir. Vojtěch Jasný, 1979, TV film)

== Awards ==
- Schiller Memorial Prize (1962)
- Grimme-Preis (1965)
