= Což takhle dát si špenát =

1977 Czechoslovak comedy science fiction film

- Directed by: Václav Vorlíček
- Written by: Miloš Macourek
- Starring: Vladimír Menšík
- Cinematography: František Uldrich
- Edited by: Miroslav Hájek
- Music by: Karel Svoboda
- Distributed by: Ústřední půjčovna filmů
- Release date: 1 September 1977
- Running time: 86 minutes
- Country: Czechoslovakia
- Language: Czech

Což takhle dát si špenát (in English: "How About a Plate of Spinach") is a 1977 Czechoslovak comedy science fiction film directed by Václav Vorlíček. The film was based on a script by his trusted collaborator Miloš Macourek. The title song, with lyrics by F. R. Čech, is sung by Jiří Schelinger. Actress Iva Janžurová played a dual role in the film, portraying both František Liška's wife, Libuše, and his daughter, Marcelka. The creators initially wanted to make this film before How to Drown Dr. Mracek, the Lawyer (1974), but received a message from Barrandov studios: "serious projects first, and then you can make your silly comedies.

== Summary ==
Two swindlers get to prison for alcohol theft. After an exit from prison they are employed in a lab inventing a device for regeneration of old cows. The owner of salon wants to use devices for rejuvenation. But something goes wrong, and they end up rejuvenated to kids.

== Cast ==
- Vladimír Menšík - Zemánek
- Jiří Sovák - Liška
- Iva Janžurová - Lišková / Marcelka (big)
- Michal Kocourek - Zemánek (boy)
- Ondřej Hach - Liška (boy)
- František Filipovský - Grandfather Liška
- Ivana Maříková - Lenka
- Petr Přívozník - Mirek
- Stella Zázvorková - Lopezová
- Josef Somr - Pereira
- Eva Trejtnarová - Mária
- Petr Kostka - Carlos
- Jaroslava Obermaierová - Vilma
- Bedřich Prokoš - Professor
- Čestmír Řanda - Mlejnek
- Juraj Herz - Netušil
