= The Girl on the Broomstick =

1972 Czechoslovak fantasy-comedy film

- Directed by: Václav Vorlíček
- Written by: Václav Vorlíček; Miloš Macourek
- Starring: Petra Černocká; Jan Hrušínský; Jan Kraus
- Cinematography: Vladimír Novotný
- Edited by: Miroslav Hájek
- Music by: Angelo Michajlov
- Distributed by: Ústřední půjčovna filmů
- Release date: 8 September 1972
- Running time: 76 min
- Language: Czech

The Girl on the Broomstick (Dívka na koštěti) is a 1972 Czechoslovak fantasy-comedy film directed by Václav Vorlíček based on a book by Hermína Franková. A sequel Saxána a Lexikon kouzel was released in 2011.

== Plot ==
A teenage witch, Saxana, who faces 300 years' detention for failing her classes, escapes to the human world with the help of a school janitor. Once in the human world, she meets Honza, a teenage boy, who takes her to school with him. At school, Saxana becomes acquainted with three of the schools' teenage delinquents, who convince her to turn the faculty into rabbits by lying and promising her that they will help in her quest to stay in the human world.

== Cast ==
- Petra Černocká as Saxana
- Jan Hrušínský as Honza Bláha
- Jan Kraus as Miky Rousek
- František Filipovský as Mr. Rousek
- Vladimír Menšík as Retired Vampire, Janitor
- Vlastimil Zavřel as Bohouš Adámek
- Michal Hejný as Čenda Bujnoch
- Stella Zázvorková as Mrs. Vondráčková
- Míla Myslíková as Mrs. Bláhová
- Josef Bláha as Wizardry School Headmaster
- Jiří Lír as Botany Teacher
- Jaromír Spal as Mr. Bláha
- Helena Růžičková as patient

== Soundtrack ==
The music for the film was composed by Angelo Michajlov. The soundtrack was released on a vinyl and CD by Finders Keepers Records in 2010.

=== Tracklist ===
1. Dívka Na Koštěti
2. Dexem Po Multo Shumpoplex
3. Telescopicas Humerus
4. Petramorphosis
5. Algebraic Airbrush
6. Suxo Plexo Muxo
7. A Pretty Kettle Of Fish
8. A Chicken In Form 9
9. Vladimír's Secret Service
10. Rats And Rodents
11. The Wisdom Teeth
12. Ridiculous Cuniculus
13. Twenty Past Two
14. An Open Window
15. Dexem Po Krumplex
16. Saxana
17. A Rabbit In Cage 6
18. A Visit From The Heavies
19. The 300 Year Itch
20. Hex F.X.
21. A Good Honest Looney House
22. Hide And Sheikh
23. Haxipola's Trip
24. Rudexa Ux Velorex
25. Expedit - A Dragon With Two Heads
26. The Magic In A Single Rose
