= Hlína =

- Municipality
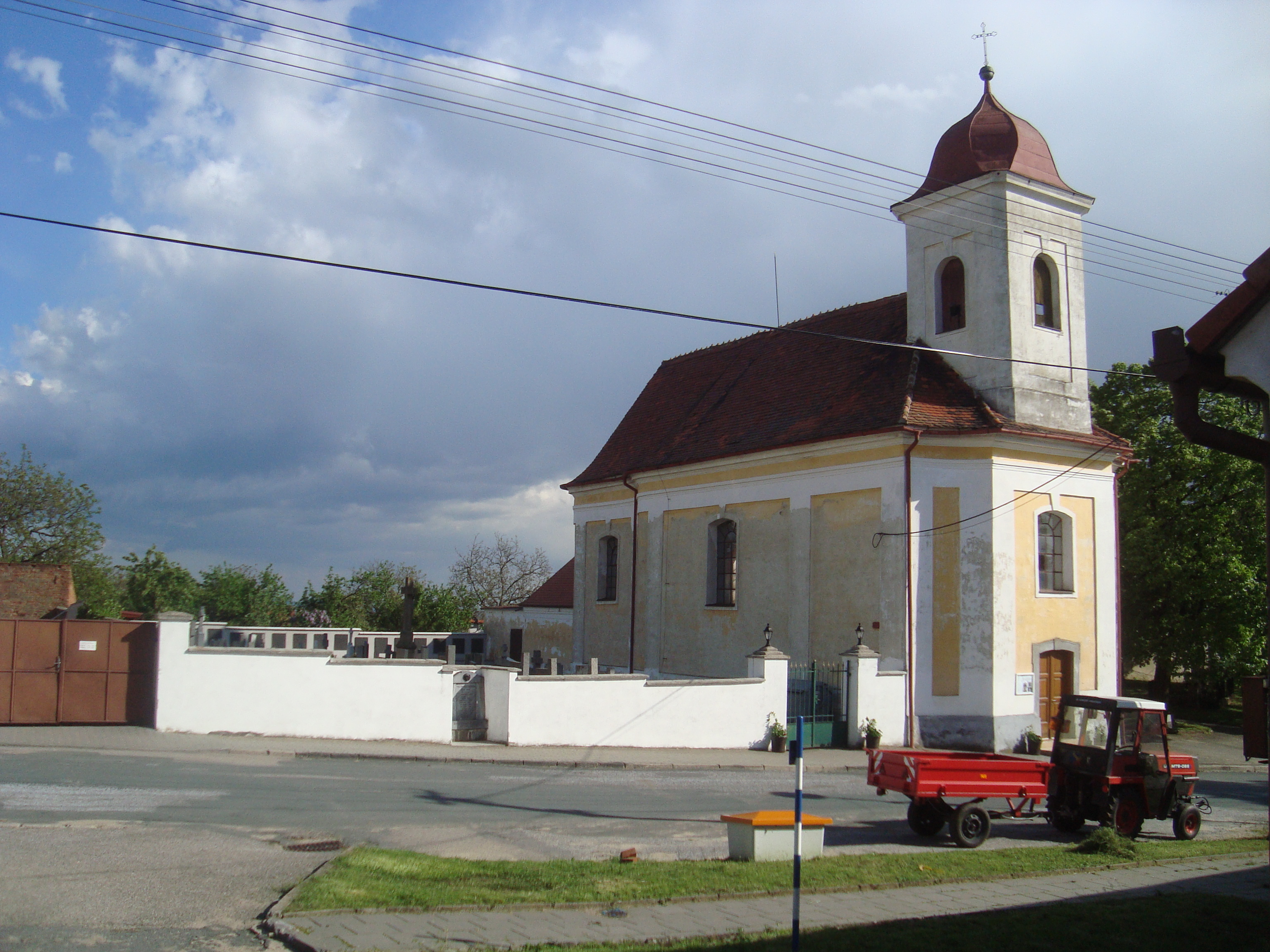
- Church of Saint Cunigunde

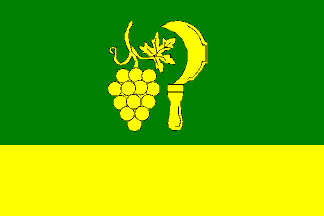
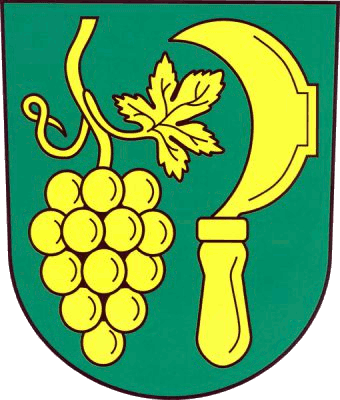
- Flag Coat of arms

- Location in the Czech Republic
- Coordinates: 49°6′49″N 16°25′34″E
- Country: Czech Republic
- Region: South Moravian
- District: Brno-Country
- First mentioned: 1537

Area
  - Total: 8.34 km^{2} (3.22 sq mi)
- Elevation: 420 m (1,380 ft)

Population (2026-01-01)
  - Total: 317
  - Density: 38.0/km^{2} (98.4/sq mi)
- Time zone: UTC+1 (CET)
  - Summer (DST): UTC+2 (CEST)
- Postal code: 664 91
- Website: www.obec-hlina.cz

Hlína is a municipality and village in Brno-Country District in the South Moravian Region of the Czech Republic. It has about 300 inhabitants.

== Etymology ==
The name means literally 'loam' in Czech.

== Geography ==
Hlína is located about 15 kilometres (9 mi) southwest of Brno. It lies in a hilly landscape of the Bobrava Highlands. The highest point is at 460 m (1,509 ft) above sea level.

== Demographics ==
Historical population

Year	Pop.	±%
1869	263	—
1880	292	+11.0%
1890	270	−7.5%
1900	327	+21.1%
1910	355	+8.6%

Year	Pop.	±%
1921	359	+1.1%
1930	377	+5.0%
1950	353	−6.4%
1961	373	+5.7%
1970	344	−7.8%

Year	Pop.	±%
1980	319	−7.3%
1991	252	−21.0%
2001	233	−7.5%
2011	303	+30.0%
2021	302	−0.3%

Source: Censuses

== Transport ==
There are no railways or major roads passing through the municipality.

== Sights ==
The main landmark of Hlína is the Church of Saint Cunigunde. It was built in the late Baroque style in 1771, which makes it the oldest building in the municipality. In the interior there is a valuable late Gothic statue of St. Catherine.

A tourist destination is the Vladimír Menšík Observation Tower. It is a 22 m (72 ft) high wooden observation tower accessible all year round. It was built in 2007. It bears the name of actor Vladimír Menšík, who was born in nearby Ivančice.
