= Tereza Brodská =

Czech actress

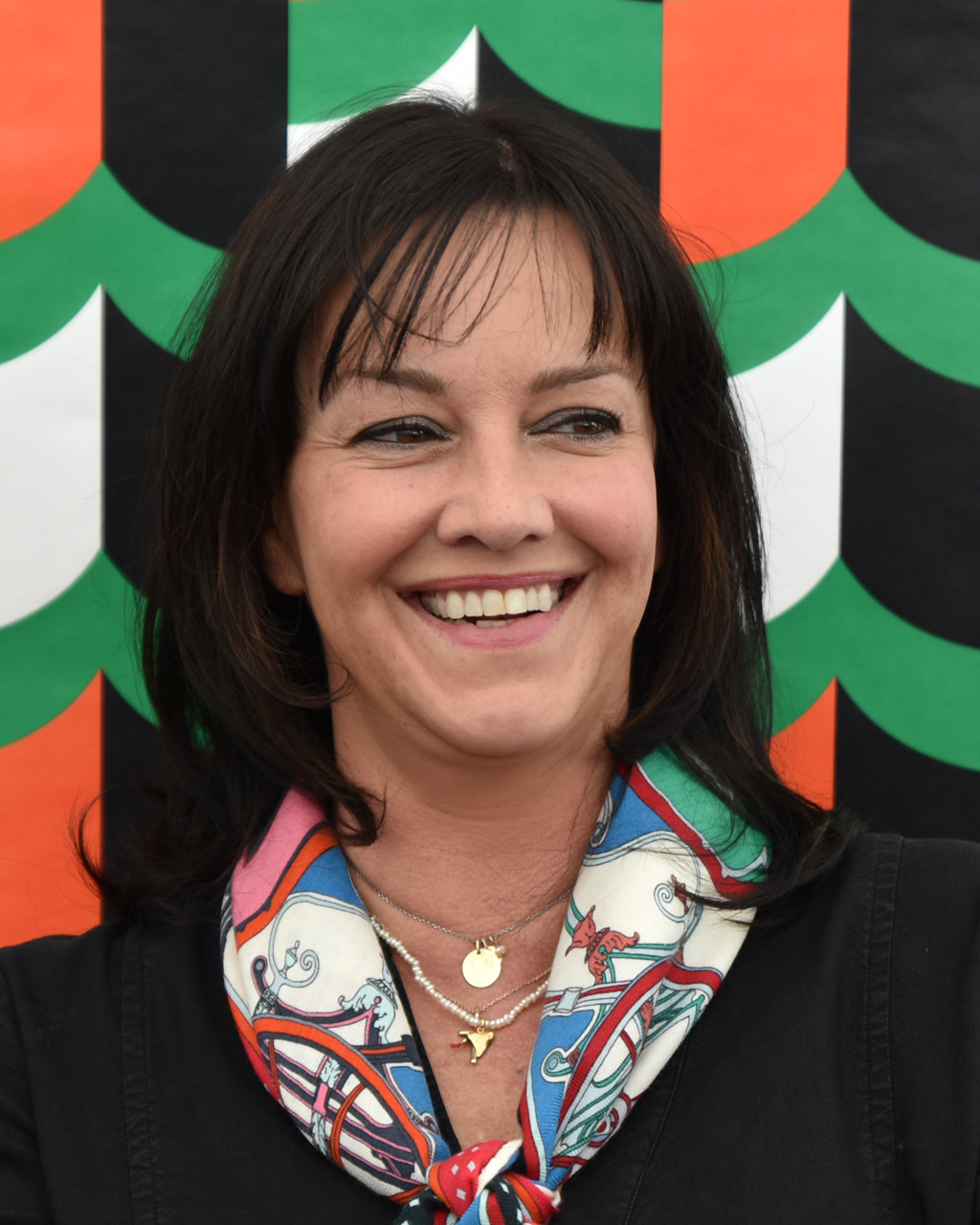
- Tereza Brodská in 2022
- Born: 7 May 1968 (age 58); Prague, Czechoslovakia
- Occupation: Actress
- Years active: 1972–present
- Parent(s): Vlastimil Brodský; Jana Brejchová
- Relatives: Hana Brejchová (aunt)

Tereza Brodská (born 7 May 1968) is a Czech actress. She is the daughter of Czech acting couple Vlastimil Brodský and Jana Brejchová. Brodská performed her first acting role in 1972. She has performed in long-running Czech soap Ulice. She won the Czech Lion award for Best Supporting Actress in 1995, for her role in Má je pomsta, and went on to win the award for Best Actress in 1999 for her role in the film Dvojrole.
