= Případ dr. Kováře =

1950 film

- Directed by: Milos Makovec
- Starring: Karel Cernoch
- Release date: 1950
- Country: Czechoslovakia
- Language: Czech

Případ dr. Kováře is a Czech drama film directed by Milos Makovec. It was released in 1950.

== Cast ==
- Karel Cernoch - Zednícek
- Stanislav Langer - Vrána
- Václav Lohniský - Vása
- Fan Vavrincová - Pokorná
