= The Clown (1976 film) =

1976 film

Ansichten eines Clowns
- Directed by: Vojtěch Jasný
- Written by: Vojtěch Jasný; Heinrich Böll
- Produced by: Heinz Angermeyer
- Starring: Helmut Griem; Hanna Schygulla
- Cinematography: Walter Lassally
- Edited by: Dagmar Hirtz
- Music by: Eberhard Schoener
- Production company: Heinz Angermeyer GmbH
- Distributed by: Constantin Film
- Release date: 14 January 1976
- Running time: 111 minutes
- Country: West Germany
- Language: German

The Clown (German: Ansichten eines Clowns) is a 1976 West German film directed by Vojtěch Jasný. It is based on the 1963 novel of the same name by Nobel Prize winner Heinrich Böll. It was chosen as West Germany's official submission to the 49th Academy Awards for Best Foreign Language Film, but did not manage to receive a nomination.

== Plot summary ==
Hans Schnier (Helmut Griem) has earned his living as a clown, though he is in fact a very covert sort of social critic. After enduring a difficult childhood in Bonn during the Second World War, including his mother's fanatic Nazism, he is appalled to discover many of the people he knows and loves swept deeply into involvement in the Catholic Church.

== Cast ==
- Helmut Griem as Hans Schnier
- Hanna Schygulla as Marie Derkum
- Gustav Rudolf Sellner as Father Schnier
- Eva Maria Meineke as Mother Schnier
- Hans Christian Blech as Father Derkum
- Alexander May as Prälat Sommerwild
- Jan Niklas as Leo, Hans’ brother
- Helga Anders as Sabine
