= The Pipes =

1966 film

- Directed by: Vojtěch Jasný
- Written by: Ilja Ehrenburg (Thirteen Pipes); Vojtěch Jasný
- Produced by: Jaroslav Jílovec
- Starring: Walter Giller
- Cinematography: Josef Vanis
- Edited by: Miroslav Hájek
- Release date: 1966
- Running time: 85 minutes
- Country: Czechoslovakia
- Language: Czech

The Pipes (Czech: Dýmky) is a 1966 Czechoslovak film directed by Vojtěch Jasný. It was entered into the 1966 Cannes Film Festival.

== Cast ==
- Walter Giller as George Randy
- Gitte Hænning as Mary Randy
- Juraj Herz as William Poker
- Václav Lohniský as Film Director
- Jaroslav Štercl
- Vivi Bach as Else
- Jana Brejchová as Lady Mary
- Karel Effa
- Josef Hlinomaz as Old-clothes Man
- Vladimír Hrubý
- Jan Kačer as John
- Waldemar Matuška as Marcello
- Vladimír Menšík
- Richard Münch as Lord Edward
- Vít Olmer as Lord William
- Gerhard Riedmann as Kurt
