= The Cassandra Cat =

1963 Czechoslovak film by Vojtěch Jasný

- Theatrical release poster
- Czech: Až přijde kocour
- Directed by: Vojtěch Jasný
- Written by: Jiří Brdečka; Vojtěch Jasný; Jan Werich
- Produced by: Jaroslav Jílovec
- Starring: Vlastimil Brodský; Jan Werich; Jiří Sovák; Emília Vášáryová; Vladimír Menšík; Jiřina Bohdalová
- Cinematography: Jaroslav Kučera
- Edited by: Jan Chaloupek
- Music by: Svatopluk Havelka
- Production company: Barrandov Studios
- Distributed by: Ústřední půjčovna filmů
- Release dates: May 1963 (Cannes); 20 September 1963 (Czechoslovakia)
- Running time: 91 minutes or 101 minutes
- Country: Czechoslovakia
- Language: Czech

The Cassandra Cat (Czech: Až přijde kocour, lit. 'When The Cat Comes'; also released under the titles When The Cat Comes; The Cat Who Wore Sunglasses; One Day, A Cat; The Cat and That Cat) is a 1963 Czechoslovak avant-garde surrealist fantasy comedy-drama film co-written and directed by Vojtěch Jasný. It is associated with the Czechoslovak New Wave.

It follows a narrator who tells the story of a tiny Czechoslovak country town and its townsfolk whose lives begin to change drastically after the arrival of a strange circus troupe and their magical cat.

== Plot ==
Robert is a school teacher in an undisclosed Bohemian village. He is under stress from Charlie, the foreboding town mayor who controls the happenings in town, and from his unfaithful and uncaring lover. Robert is forced to teach his students a ‘black and white’ view on life and a realist view on art, stifling imagination.

For an ‘artistic’ painting class, Oliva, a castellan (and storyteller) is invited as the subject. Instead of posing as a model, Oliva recounts a story of a cat with sunglasses – whose eyes revealed the true nature of the human condition through colour. Red, importantly, was the colour of ‘lovers’ – well-meaning people, whilst colours like yellow and purple were reserved for the unfaithful, envious and unruly. The ‘normal’ people eventually killed the cat, for they didn't want others to know who was good or bad.

In the midst of a circus act coming to town, Robert's cat goes missing and he is led to Diana – an actress who is part of the performance. He meets the magician who bears a striking resemblance to Oliva and talks to Robert about his ‘nature’ – joshing Robert about his choice of ‘normal’ clothes.

During the performance to the entire town, Oliva's tales of the cat come to fruition when the cat is revealed to everyone watching – and Diana takes off its sunglasses. The moment of everyone's colours being revealed drives the entire town insane, fighting amongst themselves. Robert, whose true nature is red, finds himself entranced with Diana – and the two embark on a romantic, idyllic outing.

Whilst the cat is later found by children in the woods, the school servant snatches it and attempts to have it killed – orchestrated by Charlie. Robert is tasked to teach children about a taxidermized stork in front of Charlie, but moved by the cat's power, gives a moving speech to the children that they shouldn't have to study the dead animal. This angers Charlie and the superiors in the town, who attempt to frame Robert for killing the cat.

At one point, the children go missing, stating that they will return if the cat's safety is ensured. This sends the town amok, with families squabbling in the woods to find their lost loved ones. But the children are nowhere to be found – not even Robert can find them, who tells them to come back. Eventually, the servant returns the cat and the children come out from hiding. When the crowd debates what to do with the cat, Diana and the circus act reappear to expose Charlie's true colors – a ‘chameleon’ of personalities, who is chased out of the town, reigniting the initial chaos in the town. When Robert tries to chase after Diana to accompany her, he is accosted by the frenzied crowd and loses her as the act travels out of town. Defeated, Robert walks alone back into the town square, only to be greeted by the children, who are holding art and paintings of the cat.

== Cast ==
- Jan Werich - Magician / Oliva
- Emília Vášáryová - Diana
- Vlastimil Brodský - Teacher Robert
- Jiří Sovák - School director
- Vladimír Menšík - School janitor
- Jiřina Bohdalová - Julie
- Karel Effa - Janek
- Vlasta Chramostová - Marjánka
- Alena Kreuzmannová - Gossipping woman
- Stella Zázvorková - Ruzena
- Jaroslav Mareš - Restaurant owner
- Jana Werichová - chairman's wife
- Ladislav Fialka - Thief
- Karel Vrtiska - Miller
- Václav Babka - Policeman

== Production ==
The film was shot in the Czech town of Telč.

== Reception and legacy ==
In a 1990 review for The New York Times, film critic Caryn James described the film as a "Czechoslovak allegory from 1963 meant to expose political hypocrisy". James praised the film's photography but found fault with Jasný "overdoing every effect", concluding that The Cassandra Cat "fell short of the believable fantasy it needs to live on as more than a curiosity".

Jonathan Rosenbaum referred to the film as a "genuine oddity from 1963 Czechoslovakia" and described it as "whimsical, likable, and inventive" and likened it to a cross between the Pied Piper and Bye Bye Birdie. He concluded that the film qualifies as "one of the best early examples of the Czech New Wave".

It has since become a cult classic.

=== Restoration ===
The Cassandra Cat was digitally restored by the Czech National Archive in cooperation with Laboratorio L'immagine Ritrovata and the Karlovy Vary International Film Festival from original 1963 copies found in archives in Hungary and Poland. Maintaining the film's original colour scheme proved to be a challenge due to its "multi-coloured experimental celluloid techniques". After the digital restoration, the film was shown in the Cannes Classics section at the 2021 Cannes Film Festival and digital versions of were released in cinemas throughout the Czech Republic.

== Interpretation ==
One of the most celebrated, influential and expressive pictures of the Czechoslovak New Wave cinema, and although on its surface it is a family-friendly, light-hearted, colourful fantasy dramedy film, in its core the film is subtly a political allegory for authoritarianism, false appearances and hypocrisy, with the symbolic cat being able to see the people of the town for their true colours.

== Accolades ==
The film won two major awards at the 1963 Cannes Film Festival, including the C.S.T. Prize and Special Jury Prize, Cannes.
