= Libuše Švormová =

Czech actress

- Born: 23 August 1935 (age 90); Prague, Czechoslovakia (now Czech Republic)
- Occupation: Actress
- Years active: 1959–present

Libuše Švormová (born 23 August 1935) is a Czech actress. She has appeared in over 45 films and television shows since 1959.

== Selected filmography ==
- Lovers in the Year One (1973)
- How to Wake a Princess (1977)
