= The King of Kings (1963 film) =

- Directed by: Martin Frič
- Written by: Jiří Mucha; Jiří Weiss; Martin Frič
- Starring: Jiří Sovák
- Cinematography: Václav Hunka
- Edited by: Jan Kohout
- Music by: Julius Kalas
- Release date: 12 July 1963
- Running time: 100 minutes
- Country: Czechoslovakia
- Language: Czech

The King of Kings (Czech: Král Králů) is a 1963 Czechoslovak comedy film directed by Martin Frič.

== Cast ==
- Jiří Sovák as Lojza Králu - mounter
- Miloš Kopecký as Izmail el Sarif ben Serfi
- Vlastimil Brodský as Eda Brabec
- Jiřina Bohdalová as Coiffeuse Lenka
- Walter Taub as Assassin Poupard
- Jiří Němeček as Company director
- Ilja Prachař as Novák - Officer of Ministry of Foreign Affairs
- Zdeněk Řehoř as Pantucek - Officer of Ministry of Foreign Affairs
- Eduard Kohout as Deputy minister
- Jan Skopeček as Chamberlain
- Ota Motyčka as Janitor in factory
- Lubomír Kostelka as Teacher of language
- Zdenek Braunschläger as Constructor
- Josef Bartůněk as Guard
- Jitka Frantová as Prostitute
