= In the Wee Wee Hours... =

1987 film

- Directed by: Izak Ben-Meir
- Written by: Izak Ben-Meir
- Produced by: Izak Ben-Meir; Frantisek Daniel
- Cinematography: Bruce Dorfman
- Edited by: Izak Ben-Meir; Paul Kortepeter; Roberta M Rennert
- Production company: USC School of Cinema-Television
- Release date: 1987
- Running time: 20 minutes
- Country: United States
- Language: English

In the Wee Wee Hours... is a 1987 American short documentary film directed by Izak Ben-Meir about homeless people in Los Angeles.

== Accolades ==
It was nominated for an Academy Award for Best Documentary Short.
