= Václav Lohniský =

Czechoslovak actor

- Born: 5 November 1920; Holice, Czechoslovakia
- Died: 18 February 1980 (aged 59); Jilemnice, Czechoslovakia
- Occupation: Actor
- Years active: 1950–1980

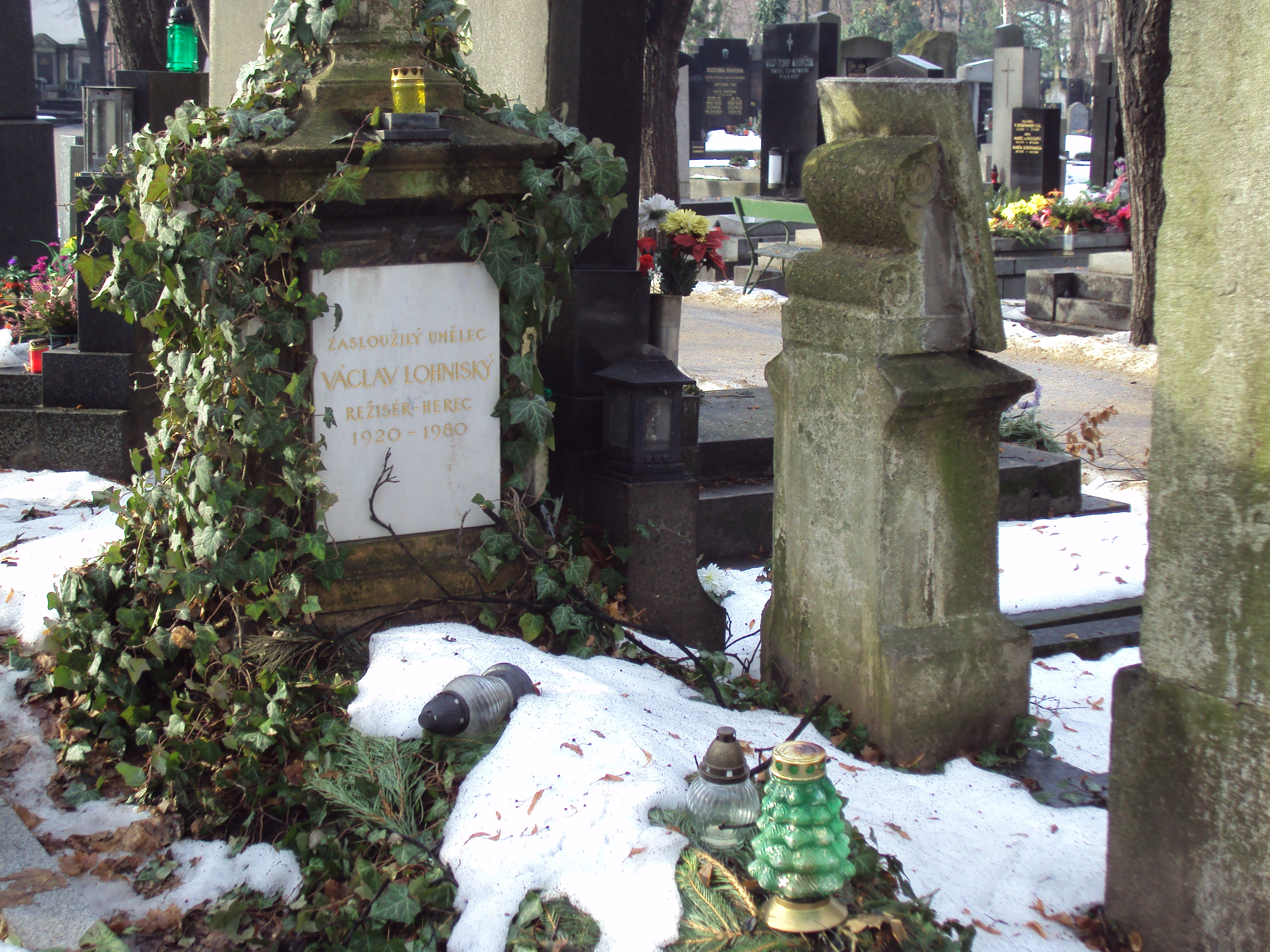
Grave of Lohniský at Olšany Cemetery in Prague

Václav Lohniský (5 November 1920 – 18 February 1980) was a Czech film actor. He appeared in 120 films and television shows between 1950 and 1980.

== Selected filmography ==
- Případ dr. Kováře (1950)
- September Nights (1957)
- Suburban Romance (1958)
- Desire (1958)
- The Flood (1958)
- Today for the Last Time (1958)
- Dařbuján a Pandrhola (1960)
- The Pipes (1966)
- Man on Horseback (1969)
- All My Compatriots (1969)
- Jáchyme, hoď ho do stroje! (1974)
- Zaklęte rewiry (1975)
- Božská Ema (1979)
