= Kohout plaší smrt =

- Origin: Liberec, Czech Republic
- Years active: 1996–present
- Website: kohoutplasismrt.cz

Kohout plaší smrt is a Czech musical band established in 1996 in Liberec, Czech Republic. The band consists of three members and is known for its punk music, although it occasionally incorporates elements from other genres.

== History ==
Kohout plaší smrt was established in Liberec by bassist Krtek and guitarist Kafka. They had relocated from Most to Liberec to pursue their university studies. They had previously played in the high school band Braun. Their partnership within the band spanned eight years, until Kafka's departure due to family-related commitments, at which point he was succeeded by Honza. Subsequent to a series of lineup changes, Béba assumed the role of the drummer within the group.

Since 1997, Kohout plaší smrt has been a consistent presence on the music scene, performing regularly throughout the year. During the summer months, the band regularly takes part in notable festivals such as Benátská noc, Keltská noc, Pod parou, and Jiráskův Hronov. Additionally, they have extended their presence beyond the Czech Republic, delivering performances in other countries including Germany (specifically Berlin), Poland (notably Warsaw), and Slovakia (including cities like Bratislava and Košice). In 2005, they went on a tour of France.

In 2016, the Maťa publishing house published a book about the band, Nejlepší by bylo mít tučňáka ve vaně.

== Discography ==
Throughout its existence, the band has compiled seven full-length albums and one EP. Kohout plaší smrt actively participated in numerous compilations alongside other punk bands in the country. The initial demo, titled "Mějme se rádi," was created in 1997. Subsequently, in 1999, it was succeeded by Nic víc, nic míň. Following the departure of Kafka and the arrival of Honza, the band produced the album Duševní výluka in 2008, as well as the recordings Hužva in 2011 and Vykřičený muž in 2013.

In commemoration of their twentieth anniversary, Kohout plaší smrt produced an EP in 2016. Concurrently, the band also produced official music videos for the songs Optimista and Lodivod, both of which have garnered hundreds of thousands of views on YouTube. The zenith of their initial two decades in the music industry was marked by the publication of the book titled Nejlepší by bylo mít tučňáka ve vaně.... This literary work was authored directly by present and past members of the band and includes the aforementioned EP on a flash drive as part of its contents.
