= Diamonds of the Night =

- American re-release poster
- Directed by: Jan Němec
- Written by: Arnošt Lustig; Jan Němec
- Produced by: Jan Procházka; Erich Svabík
- Starring: Ladislav Jánský; Antonín Kumbera
- Cinematography: Jaroslav Kučera; Miroslav Ondříček
- Edited by: Miroslav Hájek
- Music by: Vlastimil Hála; Jan Rychlík
- Release date: 25 September 1964
- Running time: 63 minutes
- Country: Czechoslovakia
- Language: Czech

Diamonds of the Night (Czech: Démanty noci) is a 1964 Czech film about two boys on the run from a train taking them to a concentration camp, based loosely on Arnošt Lustig's autobiographical novel Darkness Has No Shadow. It was director Jan Němec's first feature film.

== Plot ==
Two teenage boys flee from a moving train, shedding, as they run, long black coats that have the letters "KL" (the abbreviation for Konzentrationslager, which is German for "concentration camp") painted in white on the back. Behind them can be heard shouts and gunfire. The film employs little dialogue, and the boys' escape through forests and swamps and across rocky terrain is interpolated with depictions of the memories, dreams, and hallucinations of the younger of the two boys. He recalls exchanging his shoes with the older boy for a piece of food. When the shoes, which are too small, start to hobble the older boy, the younger boy imagines the two of them walking down a deserted city street wearing shiny new shoes, the older boy twirling a fancy cane instead of leaning on a stick. In an out of sequence, non-consecutive series of dreams and hallucinations, the younger boy imagines traveling home to Prague by train and tram, walking around, passing two Nazi soldiers without incident, meeting a girl, and repeatedly ringing the doorbell at an apartment, all while wearing the coat that identifies him as a concentration camp escapee.

The boys come across a farm. They see the farmer's wife bring the farmer lunch out in the field, and the younger boy follows the wife back into the house to ask for food. He struggles with thoughts of murder and sex, the film repeatedly showing both possibilities, but ultimately just silently takes the few slices of bread she offers and leaves.

Eventually, the boys are caught by a shooting party of elderly German-speaking men after the older boy's injured foot makes him unable to catch and jump onto a passing truck. The old men detain the boys in a beer hall, where they sit in a corner while the men drink, eat, sing, and dance. The local mayor says a passing patrol will take the boys away that evening and a military court will decide what to do with them. As they wait, the younger boy remembers the escape from the train and gets the older boy to agree, though apathetically, to attack the military patrol so they can escape again.

Two gunshots are heard, and the boys are seen lying still outside in the mud. Back in the beer hall, the mayor tells them to get out. As they walk away, the leader of the shooting party calls out, "Ready, aim, fire," but the old men merely clap and laugh and begin singing. The younger boy again imagines himself in Prague, and then he and the older boy are walking in the woods alone. The ending is ambiguous: either the boys have been spared, or they are headed to their execution; the last shot is either real, or a memory, or imaginary.

== Cast ==
- Ladislav Jánský as First Boy, who is older and taller
- Antonín Kumbera as Second Boy, who is younger and shorter
- Vladimír Pucholt as Second Boy (voice)
- Ilse Bischofová as Woman

== Production ==
In 1942, at age 15, Arnošt Lustig, a Czech Jew, was sent to the Theresienstadt concentration camp. He was later transferred to Auschwitz and Buchenwald. In 1945, he and another young man escaped from a train carrying them to Dachau when it was attacked by an American aircraft. The story "Darkness Casts No Shadow" (Czech: Tma nemá stín) from his book Diamonds of the Night (Czech: Démanty noci), a collection of short stories published in 1958, was inspired by this incident, and four years later the story was adapted into the film Diamonds of the Night. Lustig's obituary in The New York Times summarized "Darkness Casts No Shadow" as being about "two young men fleeing from a train and hiding in the woods. After stealing bread from a farm, they are caught by a local militia and are about to be executed when the militiamen simply laugh and walk away."

Němec's influences for the film include the early films of Luis Buñuel, Robert Bresson's A Man Escaped (1956), the films of Alain Resnais, and the writing of William Faulkner. Antonín Kumbera, a Roma railway worker, was cast after Němec saw him in Evald Schorm's short documentary Railwaymen (Czech: Železničáři) (1963). The other lead actor, Ladislav Jánský, was a photographer and occasional actor.

In the middle of production on the film, cinematographer Jaroslav Kučera left to accept an award at a film festival in South America. The rest of the film was shot by Miroslav Ondříček. The opening tracking shot, for which both men were present, was the longest in the Czechoslovak cinema's history and cost a third of the film's budget.

== Reception ==
On the review aggregator website Rotten Tomatoes, 92% of 12 critics' reviews are positive, with an average rating of 8.6/10.

Eric Hynes of Time Out wrote: "Němec’s technique is as emotionally intuitive as it is masterful, purposefully scrambling past and present, handheld realism (a breathless opening tracking shot) and Buñuellian surrealism (fever-dreamed ants colonizing Jánský’s angelic face). It’s a torrent of life—and cinema—in the face of death."

At the time of its U.S. release in March 1968, New York Times critic Renata Adler wrote that the film is "all quite depressing and real," but "it doesn't really work." She asserted that when misery is transplanted intact to the screen, "one loses interest. It looks unreal."

== Awards ==
- Grand Prize for Best Debut film at the 1964 International Filmfestival Mannheim-Heidelberg
- Best Editing of the Year 1965 in Films and Filming
