= Jan Hrušínský =

Czech actor (born 1955)

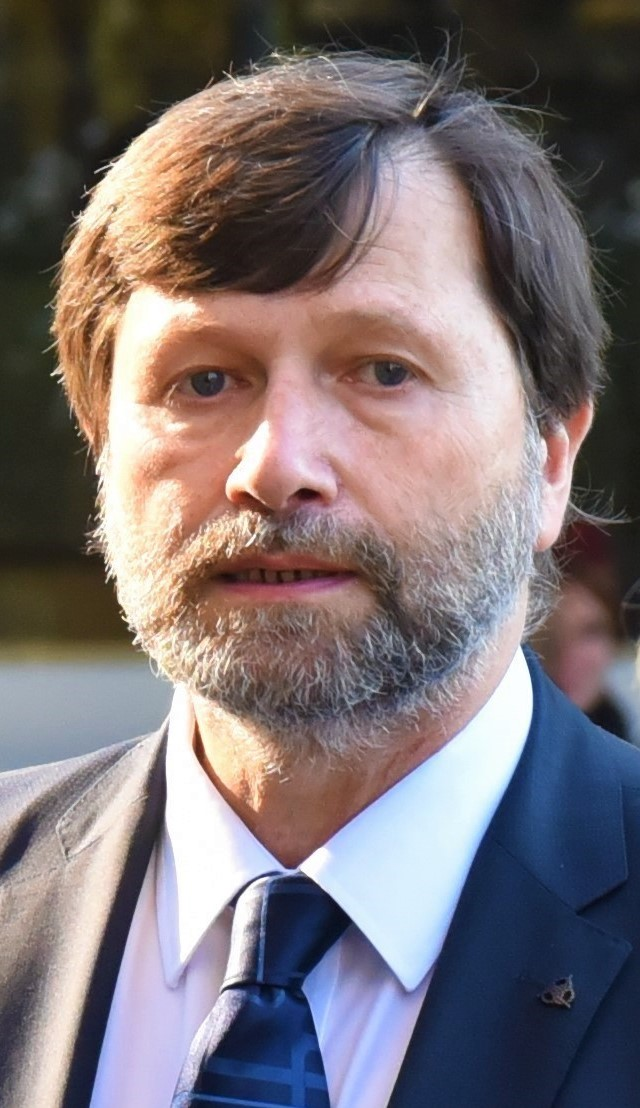
- Hrušínský in 2019
- Born: 9 June 1955 (age 70); Prague, Czechoslovakia
- Occupation: Actor
- Years active: 1970-present

Jan Hrušínský (born 9 June 1955) is a Czech actor. He has appeared in 56 films and television shows since 1970. He starred in the 1974 film Kdo hledá zlaté dno, which was entered into the 25th Berlin International Film Festival. He is a son of the Czech actor Rudolf Hrušínský.

== Selected filmography ==
- Kdo hledá zlaté dno (1974)
- My Brother Has a Cute Brother (1975)
- Jak se budí princezny (1977)
- Love Between the Raindrops (1979)
- Želary (2003)
- Beauty in Trouble (2006)
