= The Cry (1964 film) =

1964 film

- Film poster
- Directed by: Jaromil Jireš
- Written by: Ludvík Aškenazy; Jaromil Jireš
- Starring: Eva Límanová
- Cinematography: Jaroslav Kučera; Josef Abrhám
- Edited by: Jiřina Lukešová
- Music by: Jan Klusák
- Release date: 14 February 1964
- Running time: 80 minutes
- Country: Czechoslovakia
- Language: Czech

The Cry (Czech: Křik) is a 1964 Czechoslovak drama film directed by Jaromil Jireš. It was entered into the 1964 Cannes Film Festival. It is often described as the first film of the Czechoslovak New Wave, a movement known for its dark humor, use of non-professional actors, and "art-cinema realism". The film's events are ambiguous, leaving it to the viewer to determine whether the telling is objective or from a character's point of view.

== Cast ==
- Eva Límanová as Ivana
- Josef Abrhám as Slávek
- Eva Kopecká as Teacher
- Jiří Kvapil as Young doctor
- Slávka Procházková as Nurse
- Richard Záhorský as Doorman
