= Jan Němec =

Czech filmmaker (1936–2016)

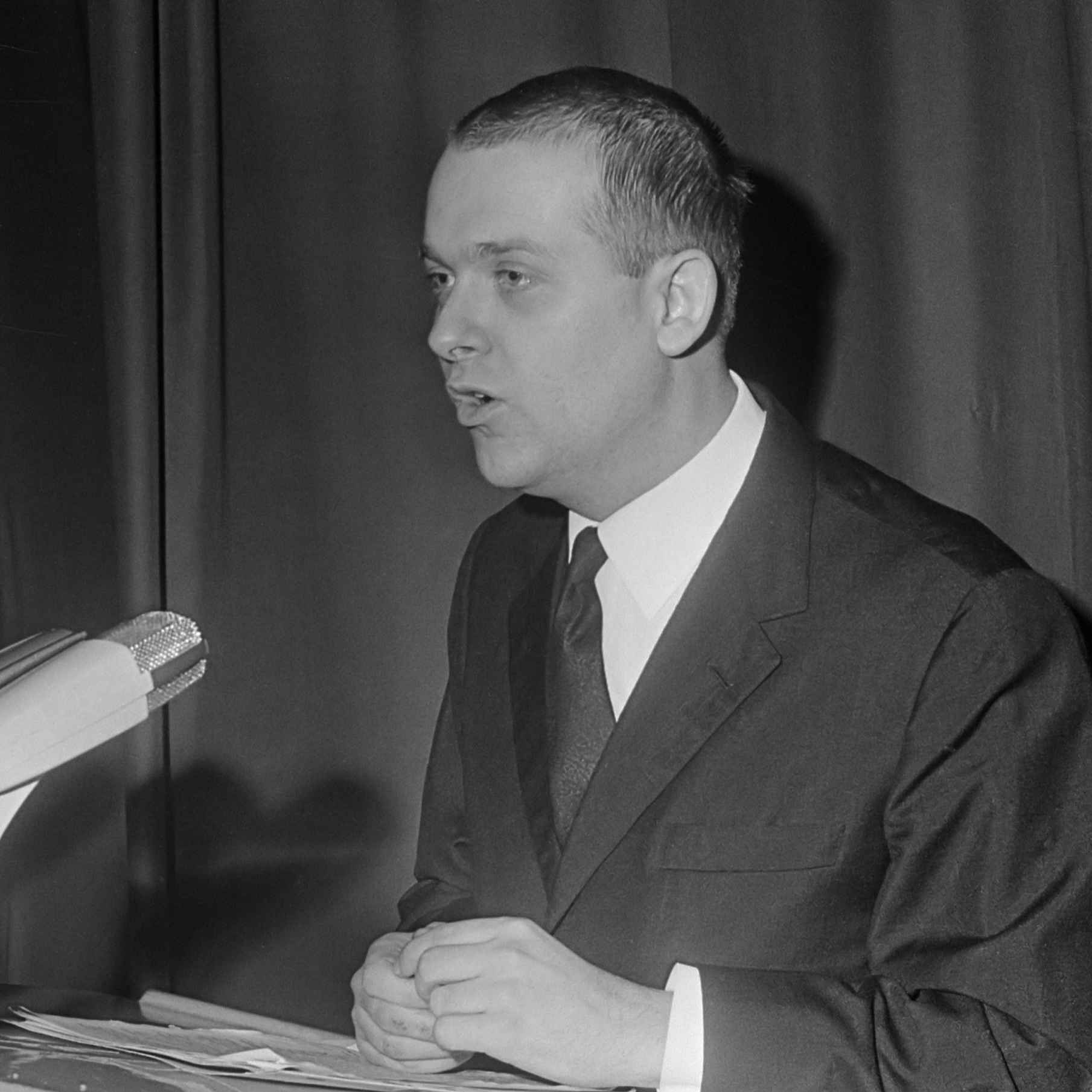
- Jan Němec in 1967
- Born: 12 July 1936; Prague, Czechoslovakia (present-day Prague, Czech Republic)
- Died: 18 March 2016 (aged 79)
- Occupation: Film director
- Years active: 1960–2016
- Movement: Czech New Wave
- Spouses: Ester Krumbachová (m. 1963–1968) Marta Kubišová (m. 1970–1973) Veronica Baumann (m. 1984–2003) Iva Ruszelakova (m. 2003–2016)
- Children: 1

Jan Němec (12 July 1936 – 18 March 2016) was a Czech filmmaker whose most important work dates from the 1960s. Film historian Peter Hames has described him as the "enfant terrible of the Czech New Wave."

== Biography ==
Němec's career as a filmmaker started when he attended FAMU in the late 1950s. At that time, Czechoslovakia was a communist state subservient to the USSR, and artistic and public expression was subject to censorship and government review. However, thanks largely to the failure of purely propagandist cinema in the early 1950s and the presence of important and powerful people such as Jan Procházka within the Czechoslovak film industry, the 1960s led to an internationally acknowledged creative surge in Czechoslovak film that became known as the Czech New Wave, in which Němec played a part.

=== Professional ===
For graduation, Němec adapted a short story by Arnošt Lustig based on the author's experience of the Holocaust. Němec would return to Lustig's writing to direct the influential film Diamonds of the Night (1964), also based on the Holocaust. That film follows the fate of two boys who escape from a train taking them to a concentration camp. It is noted for its dramatic subjectivization of the experience of the Holocaust using experimental techniques including flashbacks, simulated hallucinations, and an unusual double ending that leaves the viewer in doubt as to the fate of its protagonists. It was his first major success, and while it passed the censors' reviews, it helped lay the foundation for the political movement that was coming. The film has since been called an aesthetic and technical milestone in the exploration of human experience under extreme conditions.

His best known work is A Report on the Party and the Guests (1966). Its plot revolves around a group of friends on a picnic who are invited to a bizarre banquet by a charismatic sadist, played by Ivan Vyskočil, who eventually bullies most of them into blind conformity and brutality while those who resist are hunted down. The film received a particularly bad reception from the authorities as Vyskočil in the film had a remarkable likeness to Lenin, though according to Peter Hames this was accidental. Moreover, the cast consisted of various dissident Czechoslovak intellectuals of the day, including Josef Škvorecký. The film was viewed as being so subversive to the Communist state that Antonín Novotný, the president, was said to "climb the walls" on viewing it and Němec's arrest for subversion was considered.

However, before the political fallout from this was able to take effect, he managed to have one more feature approved: Martyrs of Love (1966). Perhaps in consideration of the previous troubles he had suffered, the film was completely apolitical, but nevertheless its surrealist lyrical style did not endear it to the authorities. In 1967 Němec made a short film Mother and Son (1967) during three days at Amsterdam film festival. The film won an award at the Oberhausen Film Festival.

He was in the middle of shooting a documentary about the Prague Spring for a US producer when the Warsaw Pact invasion of Czechoslovakia occurred. He smuggled his footage of invasion to Vienna, where it was broadcast on Austrian television. He edited the footage together with the Prague Spring documentary and released the film as Oratorio for Prague. It received standing ovations at the New York Film Festival in the fall of 1968. Němec's footage would eventually be used by countless international news organizations as stock footage of the invasion. Philip Kaufman's film adaptation of The Unbearable Lightness of Being (1988) used footage from the film; Němec also served as an advisor.

Němec was fired from Barrandov and subsequently only made a short documentary film about ambulance Mezi 4–5 minutou in 1972. He emigrated in 1974. He was given a warning by the government that "... if he came back, they would find some legal excuse to throw him in jail." From 1974 to 1989, he lived in Germany, Paris, the Netherlands, Sweden, and the United States. He stayed in the United States for twelve years. Unable to work in traditional cinema, he was a pioneer in using video cameras to record weddings, including documenting the nuptials of the Swedish royal family.

After the fall of communism in Czechoslovakia in 1989, he returned to his native country, where he made several films, including Code Name Ruby (1997) and Late Night Talks with Mother (2000), which won the Golden Leopard at Locarno.

In 1996, he became a professor at his alma mater, FAMU.

In 2014, he protested against the president of the Czech Republic Miloš Zeman by returning the medals given to him by the first president of the Czech Republic Václav Havel.

=== Personal life and death ===
He married costume designer and screenwriter Ester Krumbachová in 1963; they divorced in 1968. In 1970 he married singer Marta Kubišová; they divorced in 1973. He married his third wife Veronica Baumann, a Czech language teacher, in 1984; they divorced in 2003. He married film editor Iva Ruszelakova shortly after. In May 2003, Němec became a father. Němec died of an illness on 18 March 2016; he was 79.

== Filmography ==
Films are directed by Němec, unless otherwise noted.

| Year | English title | Original title | Notes |
|---|---|---|---|
| 1960 | The Loaf of Bread | Sousto | Short film |
| 1960 | Vstup zakázán | Young Border Guard | Actor; segment The Chase |
| 1964 | Diamonds of the Night | Démanty noci | |
| 1966 | Pearls of the Deep | Perlicky na dne | Segment Podvodníci |
| 1966 | A Report on the Party and the Guests | O slavnosti a hostech | |
| 1967 | Martyrs of Love | Mucedníci lásky | |
| 1968 | Oratorio for Prague | —N/a | Documentary short |
| 1970 | Killing the Devil | Vrazda ing. Certa | Actor: Concert audience |
| 1975 | Metamorphosis | Die Verwandlung | TV film |
| 1988 | The Unbearable Lightness of Being | —N/a | Actor: Cameraman filming tanks in Prague |
| 1988 | '68 | —N/a | Actor: Dezsö Horváth |
| 1991 | Corpus delicti | —N/a | Actor: Suitor |
| 1991 | The Flames of Royal Love | V záru královské lásky | |
| 1996 | Code Name: Ruby | Jmeno kodu: Rubin | |
| 2001 | Late Night Talks with My Mother | Nocní hovory s matkou | Documentary |
| 2004 | Landscape of My Heart | Krajina mého srdce | |
| 2005 | —N/a | Toyen | |
| 2009 | The Ferrari Dino Girl | Holka Ferrari Dino | |
| 2010 | Heart Beat 3D | —N/a | 3D film |
| 2016 | The Wolf from Royal Vineyard Street | Vlk z Královských Vinohrad | |
