= A Night at Karlstein =

1973 Czech musical film

- Directed by: Zdeněk Podskalský
- Written by: Zdeněk Podskalský; Jaroslav Vrchlický (play)
- Starring: Vlastimil Brodský; Jana Brejchová; Karel Höger
- Cinematography: Jaroslav Kučera
- Edited by: Miroslav Hájek
- Music by: Karel Svoboda
- Production company: Barrandov
- Release date: 1 August 1973
- Running time: 95 minutes
- Country: Czechoslovakia
- Language: Czech

A Night at Karlstein (Czech: Noc na Karlštejně) is a 1973 Czech historical musical film directed by Zdeněk Podskalský, based on an 1884 play by Jaroslav Vrchlický.

== Plot ==
The young queen Elizabeth of Pomerania waits in vain for her husband Emperor Charles IV at the Prague Castle. She travels to Karlštejn castle to meet him. There she finds out that women are banned from Karlštejn. She disguised herself as a young man so she can sneak inside the castle.

== Cast ==
- Vlastimil Brodský as Charles IV
- Jana Brejchová as Elisabeth of Pomerania
- Karel Höger as Arnošt of Pardubice
- Waldemar Matuška as Peter I of Cyprus
- Miloš Kopecký as Stephen II, Duke of Bavaria
- Jaroslav Marvan as Burgrave
- Slávka Budínová as Mrs. Ofka
- Daniela Kolářová as Alena
- Jaromír Hanzlík as Pešek
