= Pavel Pavlovský =

Pavel Pavlovský (born 11 December 1944) is a Czech actor.

== Biography ==
Pavlovský was born on 11 December 1944 in Prague.

In 1993, he received the Thalia Award – its first recipient – for his work in theatre. He received two Czech Literary Fund Awards. In 2011 he was awarded the Historical Seal of the City of Plzeň and in 2014 was added to the Plzeň Region's Hall of Fame. He is married and had two sons.

== Filmography ==
Movies
Movie name	Year
Celebrity S.R.O.	2007
Hodina pravdy	2000
O houslích krále snu	1987
Carovná rybí kosticka	1984
Zaspala nevesta	1984
Salvador, sedmnáctého brezna krátce po páté	1982
Hodina zivota	1981
Romaneto	1981
Paragraf 224	1980
A Touch of a Butterfly	1973
All My Good Countrymen	1969
À quelques jours près	1969
Strakatí andelé	1965

Shows
Show Name	Year	Episode amount
Kapitán Exner	2017	2
