= Ludvík Aškenazy =

Czech playwright, publicist, scriptwriter and writer (1921–1986)

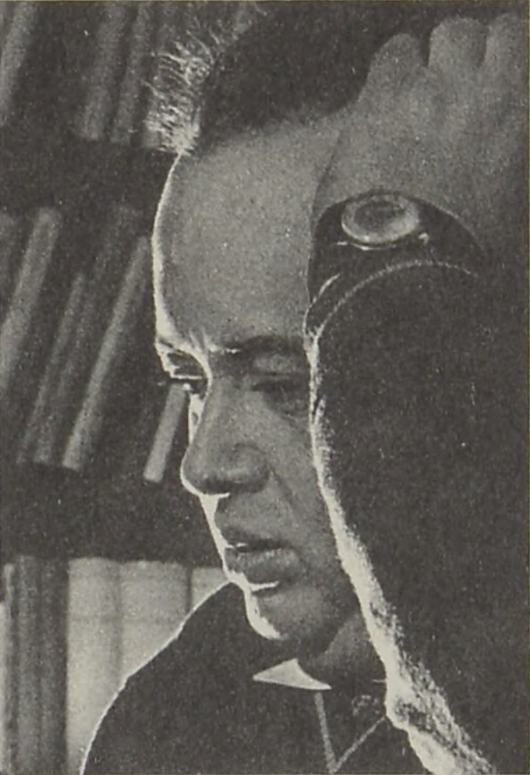
- Aškenazy in 1969
- Born: 24 February 1921 Český Těšín, Czechoslovakia
- Died: 18 March 1986 (aged 65) Bolzano, Italy
- Occupation: Writer, journalist
- Notable awards: Deutscher Jugendliteraturpreis (1977)

Signature
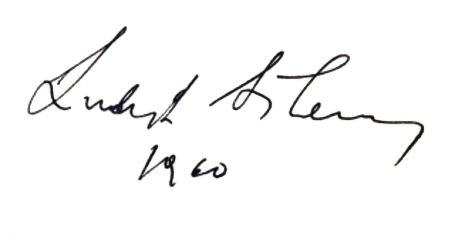

Ludvík Aškenazy (24 February 1921 – 18 March 1986) was a Czech-Jewish writer and journalist.

== Biography ==
Aškenazy was born on 24 February 1921 in Český Těšín. After the German occupation of Czechoslovakia his family emigrated to Poland and lived in Stanisławów (present-day Ivano-Frankivsk, Ukraine), which was later annexed by USSR. Later he moved to Lviv to study the Slavonic philology.

During World War II, he was a soldier in the Czech units of the Soviet Army in the Soviet Union. He was a member of the Communist Party of Czechoslovakia. Between 1945 and 1950, he worked in the state Czechoslovak Radio and after that, he became a government-sanctioned "writer."

After the Soviet invasion of Czechoslovakia in 1968, he left for exile and until 1976 lived in Munich. Between 1976 and 1986, he lived in the Italian town of Bolzano with his wife, Leonie Mann, daughter of the German writer Heinrich Mann. He had two sons, Jindřich Mann, also a writer, and Ludwik Mann, who illustrated a number of his books.

He won the Deutscher Jugendliteraturpreis in 1977 for his book Wo die Füchse Blockflöte spielen, and was shortlisted for the same prize in 1993 for Der Schlittschuhkarpfen.

Aškenazy died on 18 March 1986 in Bolzano, Italy, aged 65. He is celebrated in an annual festival in the town of Český Těšín, Czech Republic.

== List of publications (partial) ==
- Wo die Füchse Blockflöte spielen (1977)
- Der Schlittschuhkarpfen (1981)
- Du bist einmalig
- Blaubart und die Elefanten (1983)

== Filmography ==
- 1953: Můj přítel Fabian – Director: Jiří Weiss
- 1957: Tam na konečné – Director: Ján Kadár, Elmar Klos
- 1959: Májové hvězdy – Director: Stanislav Rostotsky
- 1964: Křik – Director: Jaromil Jireš (Screenplay)
- 1974: Tatort – 3:0 for Veigl (Actor)

== Translations into English ==
- Ашкенази Л. Чёрная шкатулка (зонги, баллады и истории). Перевёл с чешского на русский и английский Александр Лейзерович. Ashkenazy L. A Little Black Casket (songs, ballads, and tales). Translated from Czech into Russian and English by Alexander Leyzerovich. – Sunnyvale, CA: All Digital Club, 2002. – 140 p. pdf

== See also ==
- List of Czech writers
