= Frank Daniel =

Czech-born American film producer (1926–1996)

- Born: František Daniel; April 14, 1926; Kolín, Czechoslovakia
- Died: February 29, 1996 (aged 69); Palm Springs, California, US
- Occupations: Film screenwriter, Teacher

František "Frank" Daniel (April 14, 1926 – February 29, 1996) was a Czech-American screenwriter, film director and teacher. He is known for developing the sequence paradigm of screenwriting, in which a classically constructed movie can be broken down into three acts, and a total of eight specific sequences. He served as co-chair of the Columbia University film program, and as a dean of FAMU, the American Film Institute and the USC School of Cinema-Television. He was also an artistic director of the Sundance Institute.

== Life ==
=== Czechoslovakia ===
František Daniel was born in Kolín, Czechoslovakia. He earned a master's degree in music before studying film at VGIK in Moscow. Daniel was a member of a production unit Feix-Daniel at state-owned Barrandov Studios. In addition to that he wrote screenplays and taught screenwriting at FAMU in Prague. Among his students were Miloš Forman, Věra Chytilová or Pavel Juráček. In 1959 he had to leave Barrandov after the movies he worked on were criticised for having "liberal tendencies" by František Kahuda. In 1956, Daniel and Miloš Kratochvíl published the screenwriting textbook Cesta za filmovým dramatem. In 1965, he produced The Shop on Main Street, which won an Oscar for the best foreign language film. In 1968 he served as dean of the Faculty of Film and Television – FAMU, part of the Academy of Performing Arts in Prague.

=== United States ===
"I am sorry to say he died not long ago, and I have to tell you that he was my only teacher. He gave much to other people, he helped many people. He was a noble-minded and non-egoistic man, and no one understood the art of film-making as he did. He understood it and truly loved it – his criticism was always constructive and never purposely offended anybody. He was open about saying what he didn't like, but he did it in a way that would help you. And that cannot be said about most of the critics in USA. I am very sorry he is not here." — David Lynch

Daniel first toured the United States at the behest of W. McNeil Lowry of the Ford Foundation, who commissioned him to do a survey of film education in the United States and make recommendations for its future development. Daniel subsequently immigrated to the United States in 1969 after the Warsaw Pact invasion of Czechoslovakia. In 1969 he became the first dean of the American Film Institute, where he taught David Lynch and Terrence Malick.

Daniel left the Institute in 1976 to become Henry Luce Professor at Carleton College in Minnesota. In 1978, he moved to Columbia University, where he was reunited with Miloš Forman, his former student, with whom he co-chaired the Columbia University School of the Arts Film program. When Robert Redford founded Sundance Institute in 1981, Daniel was recruited by Sundance Executive Director Sterling Van Wagenen to be the institute's first Artistic Director, a guiding post he held for over a decade. He taught at Columbia University until 1986. After Columbia he became the dean of USC School of Cinema-Television, a post he stepped down from in 1990, continuing to teach screenwriting in the Graduate Screenwriting Division. He continued to develop scripts. He was an advisor to the Rockefeller Foundation, consultant to David Rockefeller, member of the Academy of Motion Picture Arts and Sciences and the Academy of Television Arts & Sciences. He was married twice and had two sons. Michal, a photographer, and Martin, a film professor.

== Death ==
Daniel lived in Palm Springs, California until his death on February 29, 1996. He was 69 when he died of a heart attack. He is buried at the Forest Lawn Memorial Park in Cathedral City, California.

== Books ==
- 1956 Zlatá zeď (Golden Wall) – novel based on his experiences in China
- 1956 Cesta za filmovým dramatem (The Path to Film Drama)
- 1957 Stručný přehled vývoje evropských dramatických teorií (The Compact Overview of European Dramatic Theories)

== Filmography ==
- Není stále zamračeno (1950), Screenwriter
- O věcech nadpřirozených (1958), Screenwriter
- Kam čert nemůže aka When the Woman Butts In (1959), Screenwriter
- Spadla z Měsíce (1961), Screenwriter
- Hledá se táta (1961), Director/Screenwriter
- Prosím, nebudit (1962), Screenwriter
- Deštivý den (1962), Screenwriter
- Letos v září (1963), Director
- Dva tygři (1966), Screenwriter
- Last Rose from Casanova (1966), Screenwriter
- Přísně tajné premiéry (1967), Screenwriter
- The Shop on Main Street (1968), Producer
- In the Wee Wee Hours... (1987), Producer
