= Návštěvníci (TV series) =

1983 Czechoslovak TV series

- Also known as: The Visitors
- Created by: Ota Hofman; Jindřich Polák
- Starring: Josef Bláha; Josef Dvořák; Jiří Novotný; Dagmar Patrasová; Viktor Král; Dagmar Veškrnová; Eugen Jegorov; Klára Pollertová; Vlastimil Brodský
- Narrated by: Vladimír Brabec
- Theme music composer: Karel Svoboda
- Country of origin: Czechoslovakia
- Original language: Czech
- No. of episodes: 15 + 1

Production
- Running time: 30 min

Original release
- Network: Czechoslovak Television
- Release: 5 November 1983 – 11 February 1984

Návštěvníci is a Czechoslovak sci-fi TV series filmed between 1981 and 1983 by Czech director Jindřich Polák. The 15 parts were co-produced with television-companies of the Federal Republic of Germany (West Germany at that time), Switzerland and France. As an additional 16th part for Germany a "Making of" was produced under the title "Besuch bei den Besuchern" (Visiting the Visitors). In West Germany the series was titled Die Besucher (The Visitors), in the German Democratic Republic and Australia it was called Expedition Adam 84.

The 15-part series, with episodes lasting just under half an hour, was later also released in a version comprising seven episodes of around an hour each. It features many well-known Czech actors of the time, such as Josef Bláha (The Girl on the Broomstick), Dagmar Patrasová and Vlastimil Brodský (both from The Fairy-Tale Bride), Dagmar Veškrnová (The Octopuses from the Second Floor) and the young Viktor Král (Flying Ferdinand). Well-known names were also involved behind the scenes. The series’ theme music was composed by Karel Svoboda and performed by the band Elektrovox Pražský výběr. The Prague Film Symphony Orchestra also performed under the baton of Štěpán Koníček.

== Plot ==
In the year 2484, humanity is far advanced: it has overcome wars and nation states. People have no worries and can pursue art and science. Earth is governed by the World Council, which is advised by a computer, the Central Brain of Mankind (in the Czech original Centrální Mozek Lidstva, Central Brain of Mankind).

At the beginning of the series, the Central Brain of Mankind states that the Earth is threatened by a comet that is expected to shift the Earth's axis during its imminent flyby of the Earth. The World Council is already discussing an evacuation of threatened areas.

Then the academic Filip speaks up. He refers to the genius Adam Bernau, who received the Nobel Prize in 2034. In his memoirs Bernau tells about a formula to move continents and even worlds; he had written it before or after a house fire on his eleventh birthday in three notebooks, which have not been preserved. Unfortunately, the memoir abandons the theme of world-shifting in favor of describing a "silly love" for the girl Ali, as Filip laments. Recognizing a possible alternative to evacuations, the chairman of the World Council has Filip prepare a time travel expedition called "Expedition Adam 84."

In addition to the historian Filip, the expedition members include a doctor named "Noll" for the expedition, the technician "Karas", and the documentarian "Katja". Among other things, the house from Bernau's childhood serves as a training ground in the year 2484 it is a museum.

The expedition then travels to the city Kamenice in 1984, when Bernau was 11 years old. Their time-travel apparatus is housed in a contemporary-looking Lada Niva; they pose as surveyors surveying the area for a road to be built. In Kamenice, the expedition meets not only young Adam, a curious rascal, but also his strict and narrow-minded parents, schoolmate Ali, and naive but practical outsider Alois Drchlík. The latter is recognized by the visitors as the Great Teacher, a grandfatherly friend whom Bernau had mentioned in his memoirs. The visitors become friends with Drchlík.

The time travelers have all sorts of difficulties finding their way in 1984. They are inexperienced in handling money and spend it too frivolously; they lose tools of the future such as a laser saw, etc. They also suffer from some mistakes of the Central Brain of Mankind, which, for example, sends them more money, but worthless from 1884. Karas is interested in technology and food and drink of 1984, while Noll and Katja fall in love with inhabitants of Kamenice. Filip keeps ordering them to concentrate on the task of the expedition. He is only interested in Adam Bernau, in whom he sees exclusively the future Nobel Prize winner.

In the end, the visitors are unable to seize any of the three notebooks and travel back disappointed before the real surveyors arrive in Kamenice. Shortly before, they rescue Drchlík from an accident with a tanker truck and take him with them to the year 2484. There Drchlík notices that the Central Brain of Mankind stands asymmetrically and fixes this with a wooden wedge. Set straight, the computer immediately announces that it was mistaken and that the earth is not in danger. The people of the future are relieved and enjoy objects brought by the visitors from the past, such as a Rubik's Cube.

Adam had committed property damage with his girlfriend Ali and was not allowed to see her for a while. In the last scene of the series, the boy tells his girlfriend that during this time he had been working on a formula to shift continents and whole worlds. Ali declares this work finished, since they are together again and he has promised to write her a poem. Together they ride away on bicycles.

== Themes ==
The Visitors is a utopia that depicts a life for the people of the future where war and the money-based economy have been overcome; people live according to the communist principle of ‘from each according to their ability, to each according to their needs’. A World Council, comprising men and women of different skin colours, governs humanity and also respects minorities such as the dolphins, who are likewise represented on the World Council. All people speak the same language, even though their names suggest different cultures. The people of 2484 consider themselves fortunate and think poorly of the past; during their preparations, the expedition members are shocked to see old film footage of wars, accidents and demonstrations.

Technical achievements include the colonisation of the Moon and journeys to Mars and other destinations. Disease no longer exists. Alcohol was banned in a referendum; according to technician Karas, however, the ban is secretly flouted. Entertainment consists of educational quiz programmes on art history (in a television programme that is interactive, but apparently still broadcast linearly). The people are all bald and wear wigs, at least outside the family. They are not ashamed of any other nudity.

According to the first episode, Earth is threatened by a rotating nebula, which is subsequently always referred to as a comet. Mention is made of an era of overpopulation 200 years earlier, as well as the Bermuda Triangle. Although extra-terrestrials do not appear in the series, Drchlík initially mistakes the visitors for such.

However, the world of the future is not perfect. There are still conflicts between people and character flaws. Admittedly, the people of the future are aware of the issue of covert surveillance by cameras, and they have also banned time travel following instances of abuse. (The Adam 84 expedition is granted a special exemption.) Yet the people of the year 2484 rely too heavily on a computer whose calculations they cannot comprehend themselves – despite minor errors they do notice. Ultimately, it is a down-to-earth man from the past (Drchlík) who repairs the Central Thinker. The visitors also discover many endearing aspects of life in 1984; indeed, love, friendship and family are central themes of the series.

Like many fictional time travellers, the visitors are careful not to interfere with the past. Apparently, they are able to avert any consequences of their actions; in any case, they return to an unchanged 2484. They also manage to destroy photographs of themselves before they appear in the newspaper. However, the fact that they save Drchlík from an accident that would normally have killed him is a coincidence. As the tanker explodes in the accident, the people of Kamenice are not surprised to find only Drchlík’s bicycle, but not his body. They bury an empty coffin.

The series not only questions inaccurate historical narratives but also the writing of memoirs, and deconstructs the cult of genius. For instance, the elderly Bernau mistakenly recalls how a particular magazine was given to him by Ali, whilst Filip observes that it was actually another girl. Furthermore, Bernau’s claim that his childhood was characterised by ‘family harmony’ is questionable.

Such inconsistencies suggest that Filip’s theory (that the boy has found a formula to save the future) might not hold water. Filip himself remains unable to see Adam as a normal boy and to critically question his own theory.

The series does not provide a definitive answer as to whether Adam developed the formula or could have developed it. Adam is gifted at maths; Filip tutors him, which improves Adam's school grades. Right up to the end, however, Filip spots errors in Adam’s school calculations and also in a formula for shifting worlds that Adam has written on a menu. Adam explains that he got it from a science fiction novel (‘Journey to the Tattooed Planet’), which Filip does not pursue further.

The elderly Bernau eventually writes in his memoirs about the loss of the three notebooks: “I deeply regret this, for a child’s imagination knows no bounds. I am convinced that a certain naive idea, unhindered by rules, led me even then to hint at broader possibilities for overcoming time and space than I later demonstrated in practice.”

== Reception ==
The series has been released in several other European countries, including Hungary, Yugoslavia, Poland, Romania, Bulgaria, and Spain.

Swiss Wochenzeitung calls children's programmes from the 80s highly underrated. Johannes Binotto compares The Visitors favourably to American productions:

"When it comes to the comic potential of time-travel paradoxes, Czech television was actually even quicker off the mark than Back to the Future, which hit cinemas a year later. It is truly astonishing to compare how the same idea was developed on Eastern Bloc television and in Western cinema. It seems, in fact, as though Czech television had already parodied what US cinema was only just about to bring to the big screen. Whereas, for example, the time machine in Back to the Future is built into an extravagant DeLorean, in the Czech series it is disguised as a Russian Lada estate car."

"Ota Hofman (screenplay) and Jindřich Polák (director and screenplay) have collaborated on a whole series of Czech television series, including what is arguably the most famous one, featuring Pan Tau, who works his magic with his bowler hat. In contrast to the silent, lovable Pan Tau with his harmless breaches of adult conventions, however, the tone in Navstevnici is somewhat more biting. For beneath the guise of a time-travel comedy, it is, of course, above all a satire on bureaucracy and the civil service, which is here ridiculed in the form of the narrow-minded bureaucrat and apparatchik Filip."

== Miscellaneous ==
The soundtrack of the series was released in 1984 on LP Supraphon 1113 3473H, which also included the soundtrack of Létající Čestmír (1984), also composed by Karel Svoboda, a series with the German title Der fliegende Ferdinand (The Flying Ferdinand). The soundtrack was re-issued on CD by Czechoslovak Universal in 2004.

Gadgets and costumes were designed by Theodor Pištěk, later Oscar winner.

The widow of a real professor named Filip sued the creators of the series for alleged profanation of her husband's name. She won, and the main character had to be renamed Professor Richard. This hurt the quality of the sound in the Czech version in the whole series. In the German versions the name was changed to "Philip" to avoid changing the dubbing.

== Episode listing ==
No.	Czechoslovak title	English title	Original airdate
1	Země roku 2484	The Earth in 2484	5 November 1983
2	Výprava do minula	Journey to the Past	12 November 1983
3	Návštěvníci přicházejí	The Visitors are Coming	19 November 1983
4	Akce: sešit 1.	Action: Exercise Book No. 1	26 November 1983
5	Hlavně nenápadně	Most Importantly - Act Discreetly	3 December 1983
6	Tajemství velkého učitele	Secret of the Great Teacher	10 December 1983
7	Půlnoční kolotoč	Midnight Carousel	17 December 1983
8	Génius v hladomorně	Genius in the Dungeon	25 December 1983
9	Sólo pro Návštěvníky	Solo for the Visitors	26 December 1983
10	Stav nouze	State of Emergency	31 December 1983
11	Stane se zítra	Will Happen Tomorrow	7 January 1984
12	Peníze z hvězd	Money from the Stars	14 January 1984
13	Prozrazení	Disclosure	21 January 1984
14	Po nás potopa	After Us the Deluge	28 January 1984
15	Návrat do budoucnosti	Back to the Future	4 February 1984
Special	Návštěva u Návštěvníků	Visiting the Visitors	11 February 1984
