= Who Looks for Gold? =

- Directed by: Jiří Menzel
- Written by: Jiří Menzel; Zdeněk Svěrák
- Starring: Jan Hrušínský
- Cinematography: Jaromír Šofr
- Edited by: Zdeněk Stehlík
- Music by: Jiří Šust
- Distributed by: Ústřední půjčovna filmů
- Release date: 1974
- Running time: 98 minutes
- Country: Czechoslovakia
- Language: Czech

Who Looks for Gold? (Czech: Kdo hledá zlaté dno) is a 1974 Czechoslovak film drama directed by Jiří Menzel. Filmed during the construction of the Dalešice Dam, it is one of Menzel's least well-regarded works. It concerns a young man (Jan Hrušínský) who works on the construction of a dam after his return from military service. The film was entered into the 25th Berlin International Film Festival.

== Cast ==
- Jan Hrušínský
- Jana Giergielová
- Július Pántik
- Míla Myslíková
- Alois Liskutin
- František Husák
- František Řehák
- Blažena Holišová
- Vlasta Jelínková
- Blanka Lormanová
- Oldřich Vlach - Brother-in-law
- Otakar Dadák
