= End of a Priest =

1969 film

- Theatrical poster
- Directed by: Evald Schorm
- Written by: Evald Schorm; Josef Škvorecký
- Starring: Vlastimil Brodský
- Cinematography: Jaromír Šofr
- Edited by: Jiřina Lukešová
- Music by: Jan Klusák
- Production company: Filmové studio Barrandov
- Distributed by: Ústřední půjčovna filmů
- Release date: 10 January 1969
- Running time: 98 minutes
- Country: Czechoslovakia
- Language: Czech

End of a Priest (Czech: Farářův konec) is a 1969 Czechoslovak comedy film directed by Evald Schorm. It was entered into the 1969 Cannes Film Festival.

== Cast ==
- Vlastimil Brodský as Verger Albert
- Jan Libíček as Teacher
- Zdena Škvorecká as Anna
- Jana Brejchová as Majka
- Jaroslav Satoranský as Toník
- Vladimír Valenta as Farmer
- Helena Růžičková as Farmer's wife
- Josefa Pechlatová as Grandmother
- Martin Růžek as White bishop
- Gueye Cheick as Black Bishop
- Andrea Čunderlíková as Božka
- Libuše Freslová as Bride
- Václav Kotva as Jan Páně
- Pavel Landovský as Watcher
