= Jana Brejchová =

Czech actress (1940–2026)

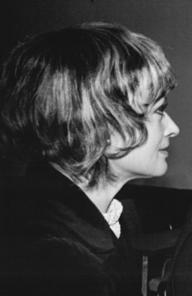
- Brejchová in 1975
- Born: 20 January 1940; Prague, Protectorate of Bohemia and Moravia (now Czech Republic)
- Died: 6 February 2026 (aged 86); Prague, Czech Republic
- Occupation: Actress
- Years active: 1953–2009
- Spouses: Miloš Forman (m. 1958; div. 1962) Ulrich Thein (m. 1962; div. 1964) Vlastimil Brodský (m. 1964; div. 1980) Jiří Zahajský (m. 1997; died 2007)
- Children: 2, including Tereza Brodská
- Relatives: Hana Brejchová

Jana Brejchová (20 January 1940 – 6 February 2026) was a Czech film actress. She appeared in more than 70 films from 1953 until 2009. Brejchová died in Prague on 6 February 2026, at the age of 86.

== Selected filmography ==
- Wolf Trap (1957)
- Desire (1958)
- Suburban Romance (1958)
- Higher Principle (1960)
- The Fabulous Baron Munchausen (1961)
- Gripsholm Castle (1963)
- The House in Karp Lane (1965)
- The Pipes (1966)
- The Return of the Prodigal Son (1966)
- End of a Priest (1969)
- Noc na Karlštejně (1974)
- The Young Man and Moby Dick (1979)
- Scalpel, Please (1985)
- The Conception of My Younger Brother (2000)
- Beauty in Trouble (2006)
