= Vojtěch Jasný =

Czech film director (1925–2019)

- Born: 30 November 1925; Kelč, Czechoslovakia
- Died: 15 November 2019 (aged 93)
- Occupations: Director; screenwriter; professor
- Known for: The Cassandra Cat; All My Compatriots

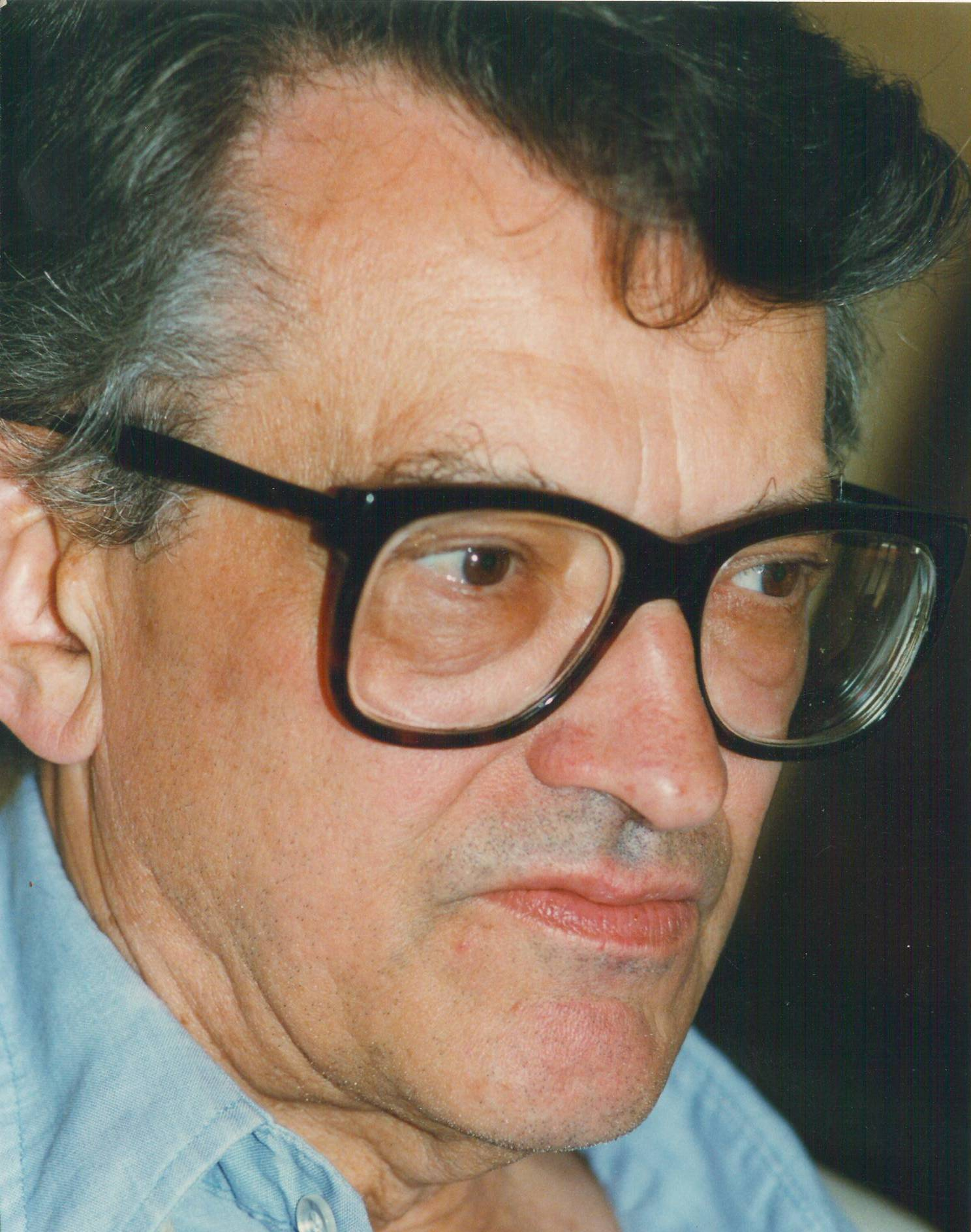
Vojtěch Jasný in 1998

Vojtěch Jasný (30 November 1925 – 15 November 2019) was a Czech director, screenwriter and professor who has written and directed over 50 films. Jasný made feature and documentary films in Czechoslovakia, Germany, Austria, USA & Canada, and was a notable figure in the Czechoslovak New Wave movement of the 1960s. He is best remembered for his movies The Cassandra Cat and All My Compatriots, both of which won prizes at Cannes Film Festival. In addition to his film career, he taught directing at film schools in Salzburg, Vienna, Munich and New York.

== Life ==
Jasný was born in Kelč, Czechoslovakia on 30 November 1925. His father was a teacher. In 1929 his father bought a movie projector for a local Sokol club, which provided Jasný's first introduction to cinema. After watching Renoir's The Little Match Girl he decided to become a filmmaker. During his teens, he made amateur movies on a 9mm camera. During WWII his father was arrested and sent to Auschwitz where he died in 1942. After the war Jasný went to study philosophy and Russian language, but he switched to study filmmaking at newly founded FAMU in 1946. His professors were Karel Plicka, Vsevolod Pudovkin and hosting professors Cesare Zavattini and Giuseppe De Santis. Since 1950, he co-directed many documentaries with Karel Kachyňa. His movies Desire and The Cassandra Cat were nominated for Palme d'Or. In 1968, he directed All My Compatriots which won the award for Best Director at the 1969 Cannes Film Festival.

After the Warsaw Pact invasion of Czechoslovakia following the Prague Spring of 1968, he decided to leave the country. Jasný made movies and taught at film schools in Austria, West Germany and Yugoslavia until relocating to Brooklyn, New York in the early 1980s. In the USA, Jasný taught film directing classes at Columbia University, School of Visual Arts and New York Film Academy and made several documentaries about Czechoslovakia. His last feature film, Return to Paradise Lost, was made in 1999.

In 2009 Arkaitz Basterra Zalbide made a documentary about Jasný called Life and Film (The Labyrinthine Biographies of Vojtěch Jasný) which was later released as a book.

He died on November 13, 2019, aged 93.

== Filmography ==
=== Feature films ===
Year	Title	Director	Writer	Notes
1954	Everything Ends Tonight	Yes	No	Co-directed with Karel Kachyňa
1956	Opportunity	Yes	No	Short film
1957	September Nights	Yes	Yes	
1957	Anděla	Yes	Yes	Short film
1958	Desire	Yes	No	Nominated for Palme d'Or
1960	I Survived Certain Death	Yes	No	
1961	Pilgrimage to the Virgin Mary	Yes	Yes	
1963	The Cassandra Cat	Yes	Yes	1963 Cannes Film Festival - Jury Special Prize
1966	The Pipes	Yes	No	
1968	All My Compatriots	Yes	Yes	1969 Cannes Film Festival - Best Director Award
1976	Attempted Flight	Yes	No	
1976	The Clown	Yes	No	West Germany's submission to the 49th Academy Awards for Best Foreign Language Film
1985	The Peanut Butter Solution	No	Yes	
1987	The Great Land of Small	Yes	No	
1999	Return of the Paradise Lost	Yes	Yes	

=== Television films ===
- 1969: Warum ich Dich liebe
- 1970: Christmas Not Just Once a Year — (based on Christmas Not Just Once a Year by Heinrich Böll)
- 1972: Der Leuchtturm — (based on a story by Ladislav Mňačko)
- 1972: Nasrin oder Die Kunst zu träumen — (based on a play by Herbert Asmodi)
- 1974: Der Kulterer — (based on Der Kulterer by Thomas Bernhard)
- 1974: Frühlingsfluten — (based on Torrents of Spring)
- 1975: Des Pudels Kern — (screenplay by Ludvík Aškenazy)
- 1976: Alexander März — (screenplay by Heinar Kipphardt)
- 1976: Bäume, Vögel und Menschen
- 1977: Fairy — (screenplay by Lotte Ingrisch)
- 1977: Mein seliger Onkel
- 1977: Die Rückkehr des alten Herrn
- 1978: Die Freiheiten der Langeweile — (screenplay by Dieter Wellershoff)
- 1979: Die Stühle des Herrn Szmil — (based on a play by Heinar Kipphardt)
- 1979: Die Nacht, in der der Chef geschlachtet wurde — (based on a play by Heinar Kipphardt)
- 1980: The Woman from Sarajevo — (based on a novel by Ivo Andrić)
- 1980: Ehe der Hahn kräht — (based on a play by Ivan Bukovčan)
- 1980: The Ideas of Saint Clara — (based on the play by Jelena and Pavel Kohout)
- 1982: Wir — (based on We, the 1921 Russian novel by Yevgeny Zamyatin).
- 1983: Es gibt noch Haselnußsträucher — (based on Il y a encore des noisetiers by Georges Simenon)
- 1984: Bis später, ich muss mich erschießen — (based on The Suicide)
- 1984: The Blind Judge (TV series about John Fielding, 13 episodes) — (screenplay by Günter Kunert)

=== Documentaries ===
- 1950: Není stále zamračeno
- 1950: They Know What to Do (Vědeli si rady)
- 1950: Za život radostný
- 1952: Neobyčejná léta
- 1953: Lidé jednoho srdce
- 1954: Old Chinese Opera (Stará čínská opera)
- 1954: From a Chinese Notebook (Z čínského zápisníku)
- 1955: No Fear (Bez obav)
- 1969: Czech Rhapsody (Česká rapsodie)
- 1976: Ernst Fuchs
- 1989: Miloš Forman: Portrait
- 1991: Why Havel?
- 1999: Gladys
- 2002: Broken Silence (Segment "Hell on Earth")
