= Vlastimil Brodský =

Czech actor (1920–2002)

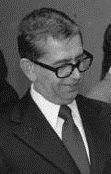
- Brodský in 1975
- Born: 15 December 1920; Hrušov, Czechoslovakia
- Died: 20 April 2002 (aged 81); Slunečná, Czech Republic
- Occupation: Actor
- Years active: 1944–2001
- Spouse: Jana Brejchová (m. 1964; div. 1980)
- Children: 2, including Tereza Brodská

Vlastimil Brodský (15 December 1920 – 20 April 2002) was a Czech actor. He appeared in more than one hundred films, and is considered a key figure in the postwar development of Czech cinema.

One of his best-known roles was as the title character in Jakob der Lügner for which he won the Silver Bear for Best Actor at the 25th Berlin International Film Festival. He also played the king in the hit children's TV series Arabela and as Alois Drchlík in The Visitors.

His final film role was as a pensioner named Frantisek in Autumn Spring. This role earned him his first and only Czech Lion (a prestigious film award), for best actor.

== Personal life ==
He was married to the actress Jana Brejchová for 16 years before getting a divorce; actress Tereza Brodská is their daughter. Brodský also had a son, actor Marek Brodský. Brodský committed suicide on 20 April 2002.

== Selected filmography ==
- The Secret of Blood (1953)
- Focus, Please! (1956)
- September Nights (1957)
- Today for the Last Time (1958)
- Desire (1958)
- When the Woman Butts In (1959)
- The Cassandra Cat (1963)
- The King of Kings (1963)
- Closely Watched Trains (1966)
- People on Wheels (1966)
- Capricious Summer (1968)
- All My Compatriots (1968)
- Světáci (1969)
- Larks on a String (1969)
- End of a Priest (1969)
- The Death of Black King (1971)
- A Night at Karlstein (1974)
- Jacob the Liar (1975)
- Seclusion Near a Forest (1976)
- Tomorrow I'll Wake Up and Scald Myself with Tea (1977)
- Arabela (1979–1981)
- The Mysterious Castle in the Carpathians (1981)
- Návštěvníci (1983–1984)
- Labyrinth (1991)
- Autumn Spring (2001)
