= Vladimír Menšík =

Czech actor (1929–1988)

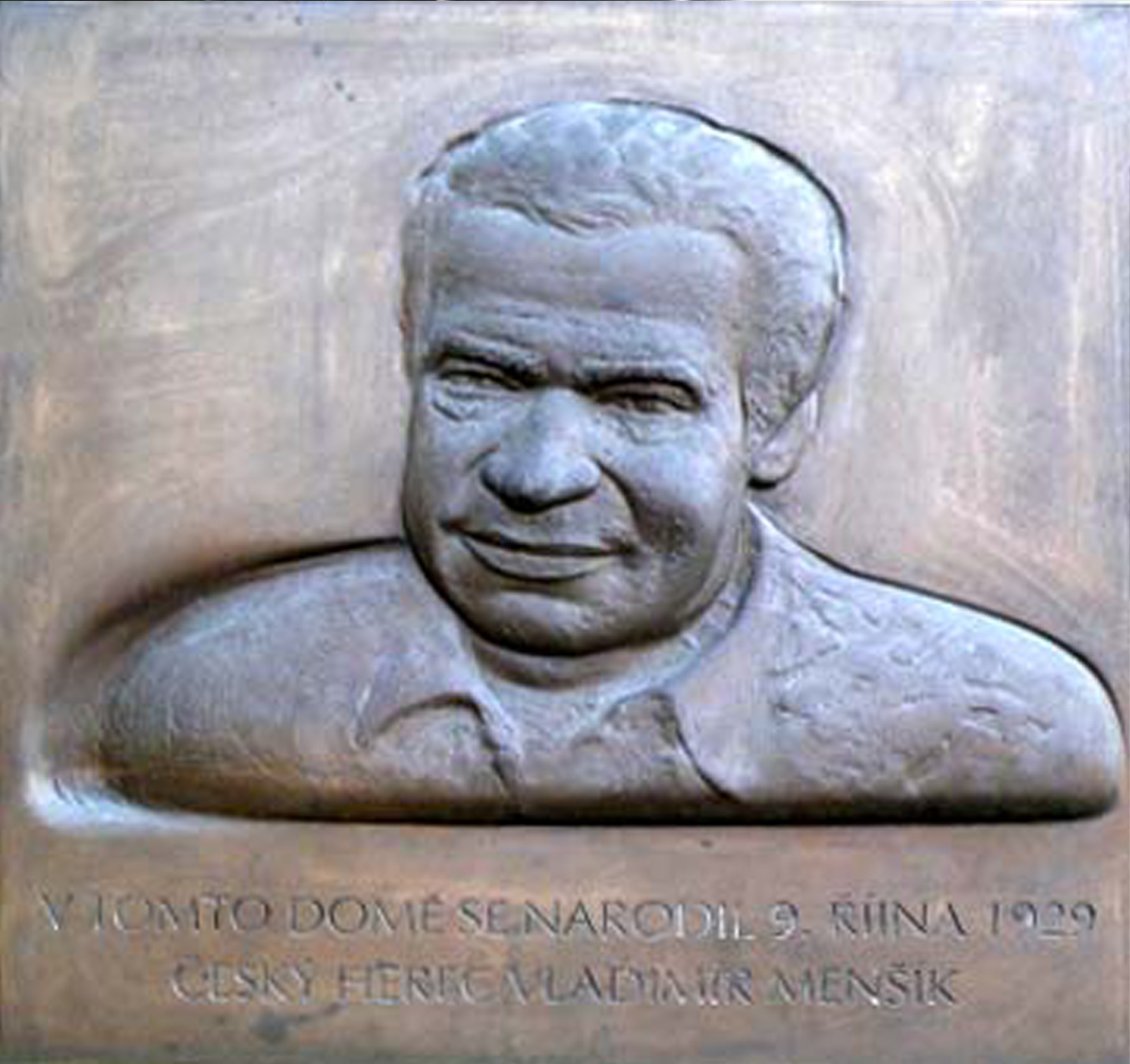
- Memorial plaque in Ivančice
- Born: Vladislav Menšík; 9 October 1929; Ivančice, Czechoslovakia
- Died: 29 May 1988 (aged 59); Brno, Czechoslovakia
- Burial place: Olšany Cemetery, Prague
- Occupations: Actor, entertainer
- Years active: 1953–1988
- Spouses: Věra Menšíková (divorced); Olga Menšíková (m. 1963)

Vladimír Menšík (9 October 1929 – 29 May 1988) was a Czech actor and entertainer. He is considered one of the greatest Czech comedians, storytellers and improvisers.

== Life ==
Vladimír Menšík was born on 9 October 1929 in Ivančice, Czechoslovakia as Vladislav Menšík. The year 1924 was listed during his lifetime, after Menšík falsified his documents for fun. He also once stated that he did it so he could "retire early". The fraud was discovered in 1988, shortly before his death.

Despite suffering from asthma, he was a keen athlete and played handball competitively. In 1949, he graduated from the secondary mechanical engineering school in Brno. In 1953, he graduated from the Janáček Academy of Performing Arts in Brno. He learned to sing and to play the clarinet, piano and mandolin. He then moved to Prague and started working in theatres there. In 1954–1958, he played in E. F. Burian Theatre and was a guest in other theatres. Because he did not enjoy performing on a daily basis, he then left the theatre and became a member of the acting ensemble of the Barrandov Film Studio.

Menšík was married twice. He had two children with each of his wives.

He died in a hospital in Brno on 29 May 1988, at the age of 58. The cause of his death was asthma combined with his lifestyle – he was a heavy smoker and had problems with alcoholism. He is buried at the Olšany Cemetery in Prague.

== Career ==
Both comedian and serious actor, he created a wide range of lively characters. He starred in more than 150 roles in movies, TV films and TV series. He is often ranked among the best Czech comedians, improvisers and storytellers. In addition to acting in films, he became famous as a guest of entertainment shows and live performances.

=== Selected work ===
Films

- September Nights (1957)
- The Slinger (1960)
- Hledá se táta (1961)
- The Cassandra Cat (1963)
- Lemonade Joe (1964)
- Loves of a Blonde (1965)
- Marketa Lazarová (1967)
- All My Good Countrymen (1968)
- The Cremator (1969)
- Světáci (1969)
- You Are a Widow, Sir (1970)
- The Girl on the Broomstick (1972)
- Three Wishes for Cinderella (1973)
- How to Drown Dr. Mracek, the Lawyer (1974)
- Což takhle dát si špenát (1977)
- Tomorrow I'll Wake Up and Scald Myself with Tea (1977)
- How to Wake a Princess (1978)
- The Prince and the Evening Star (1979)
- Love Between the Raindrops (1980)
- Dobří holubi se vracejí (1987)

TV series

- Pan Tau (1970–1979)
- F. L. Věk (1971–1972)
- Byl jednou jeden dům (1975)
- Chalupáři (1975)
- Arabela (1979–1981)
- Návštěvníci (1983–1984)
- Létající Čestmír (1984)

== Honours and legacy ==
He won the national Most Popular Actor poll four times (in 1969, 1973, 1974 and 1978). In 1974, he became Meritorious Artist (a state-awarded honorary title for outstanding artists). In 1978, he was awarded National Artist (a higher-degree honorary title).

In the 2005 Největší Čech ("The Greatest Czech") poll, he was ranked 37th.

In his native Ivančice, a primary school bears Menšík's name. In the Cultural and Information Centre in Ivančice is an exposition of life and work of Vladimír Menšík.

A tram in Brno was named after Menšík in 2016.

An observation tower in Hlína next to Ivančice bears Menšík's name.
