= Jiří Sovák =

Czech actor (1920–2000)

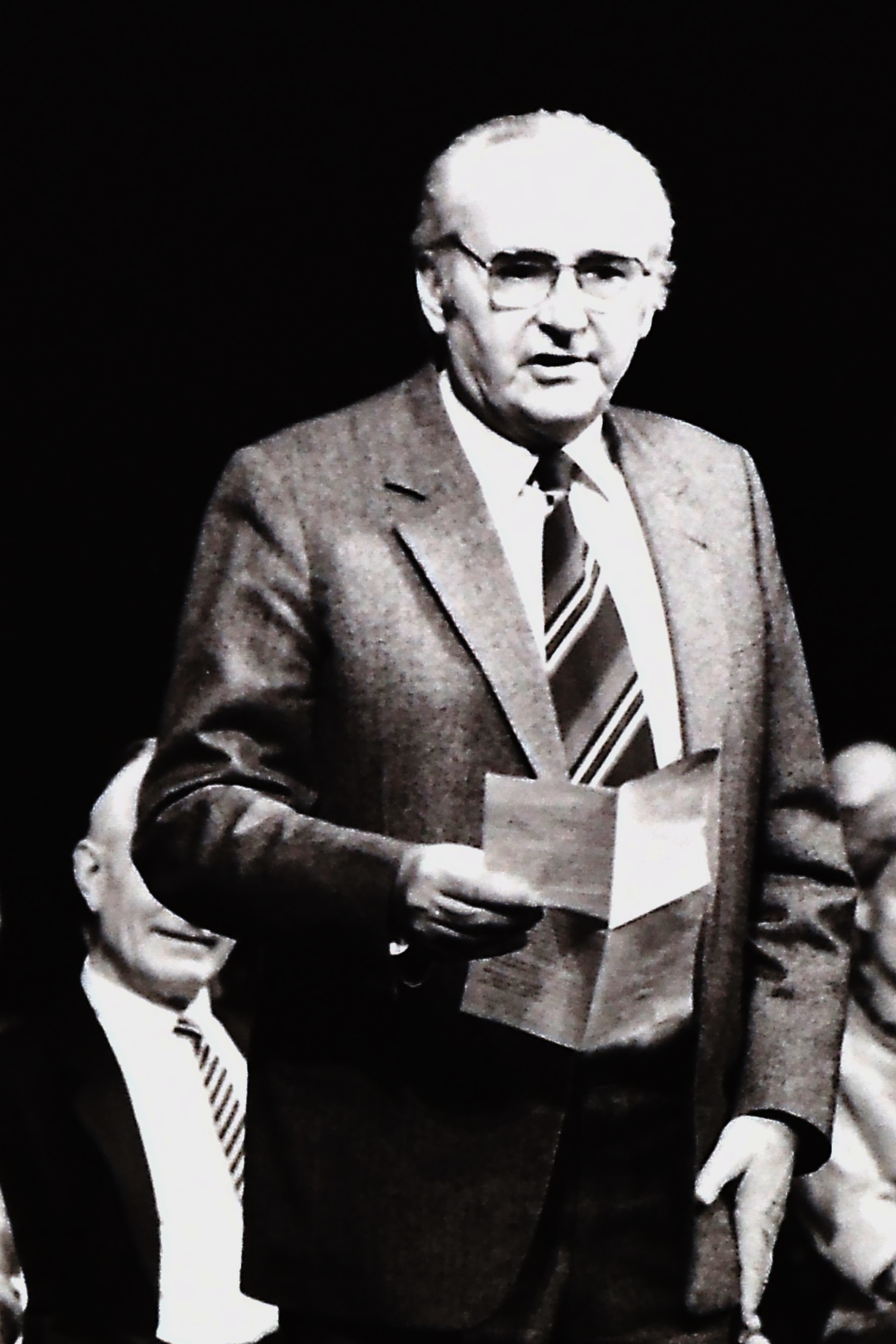
- Jiří Sovák in 1989
- Born: Jiří Schmitzer; 27 December 1920; Prague, Czechoslovakia
- Died: 6 September 2000 (aged 79); Prague, Czech Republic
- Occupation: Actor
- Years active: 1942–1999

Jiří Sovák (né Schmitzer; 27 December 1920 – 6 September 2000) was a Czech actor, best known for his comedy roles.

== Early life ==
Jiří Sovák was born Jiří Schmitzer to the family of an innkeeper in Prague. He later changed his name to Sovák as a protest against Nazi Germany and its occupation of Czechoslovakia. In 1941 – during WW2 – he graduated from Prague State Conservatory where he studied drama. His father did not want him to be an actor, so he worked as a clerk and played in an amateur theatre group; today known as Rokoko Theatre.

== Career ==
In 1943 he got his first professional engagement with Horácké Theatre in Třebíč. During military service he met Miroslav Horníček (who became famous actor too) and made friends for life.

In 1947 he went to Prague where he played in the E.F. Burian Theatre (1947–1952), Vinohrady Theatre (1952–1966) and National Theatre (1966–1983).

=== Film and TV career ===
Jiří Sovák first appeared in a movie in 1942 and then played many minor roles. He played his first main character in Dařbuján a Pandrhola (dir. Martin Frič, 1959) and created a expressive roles in the 1960s, '70s and '80s. Among his best-known roles are Antonín Skopec in Světáci (Dandies; dir. Zdeněk Podskalský) and Jiří Kroupa in Marečku, podejte mi pero! (Mark, Fetch Me a Pen!; dir. Oldřich Lipský, 1976). He also played in comedies such as Pane, vy jste vdova (You Are a Widow, Sir!; dir. Václav Vorlíček, 1970) or Což takhle dát si špenát (What About Having Some Spinach; dir. Václav Vorlíček, 1977), sci-fi comedies such as Zabil jsem Einsteina, pánové (I Killed Einstein, Sirs; dir. Oldřich Lipský, 1970) or Zítra vstanu a opařím se čajem (Tomorrow I'll Wake Up and Scald Myself with Tea; dir. Jindřich Polák, 1977), and movies for children, e.g. Ať žijí duchové (Long Live Ghosts; dir. Oldřich Lipský, 1977). In 1990s he played old men such as the cabinet maker Růžička in Kolya. Sovák's last movie role was in Návrat ztraceného ráje (Lost Paradise Recovered; dir. Vojtěch Jasný, 1999).

Sovák entered Czechoslovak television as soon as it came into existence in 1953. He played in TV film and serial microcomedies such as Uspořená libra (A Pound on Demand, based on a play by Seán O'Casey; Vladimír Svitáček, 1963), and Bohouš (1968); and children's TV serials such as Pan Tau, Arabela, and Létající Čestmír. His most successful roles were in the serials Byli jednou dva písaři (with Horníček; based on Bouvard et Pécuchet by Gustave Flaubert; dir. Ján Roháč, 1972) and Chalupáři (Cottagers; 1975).

== Personal life ==
He married three times. His son from his first marriage, Jiří Schmitzer (b. 1949), became an actor and folk singer. Sovák had a poor relationship with his son (with whom he appeared in many movies) after he left his wife that worsened when Schmitzer caused a fatal car crash in 1976.

He retired on 31 March 1983. In 2000 he fell on his terrace, broke his hip and had an embolism during his operation. He died in a Prague hospital before reaching 80. He is buried in small town Stříbrná Skalice, in a private grave closed to the public.
