= Hana Zagorová discography =

This is the discography of Hana Zagorová, a popular Czech female singer, nine times listed number one in the national Zlatý Slavík ('Golden Nightingale') popularity chart.

== Music ==
=== 1968 Hana Zagorová - SP ===
Supraphon, SU 430 489

1. Svatej kluk
2. Jsem bláhová (Marie Rottrová only)

=== 1968 Hana Zagorová - SP ===
Supraphon, SU 430 488

1. Prý jsem zhýralá
2. Dinda

=== 1968 Hana Zagorová - SP ===
Supraphon, SU 430 535

1. Jsou v blátivý cestě koleje
2. Cyganicha

=== 1968 Hana Zagorová - SP ===
Supraphon, SU 430 566

1. Poslední šantán
2. Obraz smutný slečny

=== 1968 Hana Zagorová - SP ===
Supraphon, SU 430 654

1. Honey (Honey)
2. Mrtvá láska

=== 1968 Hana Zagorová - SP ===
Supraphon, SU 430 717

1. Zlá dáma
2. Monolog

=== 1968 Various Artists - Beat Line (LP) ===
Supraphon, SU 130 525

1. Svatej kluk

=== 1968 Various Artists - Zlatý Slavík (LP) ===
Supraphon, SU 130 636

1. Obraz smutný slečny

=== 1969 Various Artists - Boublík: Klub Dokonalé Zdravovědy Jana Boublíka ze Žlutic (LP) ===
Supraphon, SU 113 0809

1. Jean
2. Kočičí slabikář
3. Motýlí žal
4. Dům svalové ztuhlosti (w/Viktor Sodoma, Jiří Štědroň)

=== 1969 Hana Zagorová - SP ===
Supraphon, SU 430 752

1. Písmo maličký
2. Tisíc nových jmen

=== 1969 Hana Zagorová - SP ===
Supraphon, SU 430 831

1. Bludička Julie
2. Rokle

=== 1969 Hana Zagorová - SP ===
Supraphon, SU 430 835

1. Miláček
2. Verbíř

=== 1969 Hana Zagorová - SP ===
Supraphon, SU 430 873

1. Zum zum zum
2. Černý pasažér

=== 1969 Various Artists - 2. ČS Beat Line (LP) ===
Supraphon, SU 130 607

1. I say a little prayer for you
2. Chain of fools

=== 1969 Various Artists - VIII. Album Supraphonu (LP) ===
Supraphon, SU 130 688

1. Poslední šantán

=== 1970 Hana Zagorová - SP ===
Supraphon, SU 430 936

1. O.K.
2. Znám krásný přísloví

=== 1970 Hana Zagorová - SP ===
Supraphon, SU 430 953

1. Bílou křídou
2. Budeš zase lhát

=== 1970 Hana Zagorová - SP ===
Supraphon, SU 431 061

1. Kočičí slabikář
2. Jean

=== 1970 Hana Zagorová - SP ===
Supraphon, SU 431 078

1. Venuše (Venus)
2. Piknik

=== 1970 Hana Zagorová - SP ===
Supraphon, SU 431 148

1. Gvendolína
2. Nemám ráda

=== 1971 Hana Zagorová - Bludička (LP) ===
Supraphon, SU 113 0910

1. Tisíc nových jmen
2. Papá Benjamin
3. Podivín
4. Básník a já
5. Řeka v mém pokoji
6. To bylo léto bláznivý
7. Bludička Julie
8. Bloumat po neznámým pobřeží
9. Zlej kámen
10. Devět poupat
11. Tanečnice
12. Rozhledna

=== 1971 Hana Zagorová - SP ===
Supraphon, SU 431 205

1. Já jsem tvá neznámá
2. Koho tlačí můra

=== 1971 Hana Zagorová - SP ===
Supraphon, SU 431 233

1. Pan Tydlitýt a pan Tydlidát
2. Nádraží v městečku M.

=== 1971 Various Artists - 12 na Rok (LP) ===
Supraphon, SU 131 096

1. Gvendolína

=== 1971 Various Artists - IX. Album Supraphonu (LP) ===
Supraphon, SU 130 984

1. Bludička Julie

=== 1972 Hana Zagorová - Bludička Julie Hany Zagorové (MC) ===
Supraphon, SU 8130 138

1. Bludička Julie
2. Znám krásný přísloví
3. Tisíc nových jmen
4. Písmo maličký
5. Nemám ráda
6. Gvendolína
7. Já jsem tvá neznámá
8. Nádraží v městečku M.
9. Koho tlačí můra
10. Až já budu bohatá
11. Pan Tydlitýt a pan Tydlidát
12. Sliby-chyby

=== 1972 Hana Zagorová - SP ===
Supraphon, SU 431 299

1. Až já budu bohatá
2. Sliby-chyby

=== 1972 Various Artists - Supraphon Hity '72 (LP) ===
Supraphon, SU 899 859

1. Já jsem tvá neznámá

=== 1972 Various Artists - Zlatý Slavík 1971 (LP) ===
Supraphon, SU 1131 209

1. Já jsem tvá neznámá

=== 1972 Various Artists - Prague Pop Apostles (LP) ===
Supraphon, SU 1131 026

1. Bludička Julie

=== 1973 Hana Zagorová - SP ===
Supraphon, SU 431 451

1. Malej Vilibald (Little Villi)
2. Fatamorgana

=== 1973 Hana Zagorová - SP ===
Supraphon, SU 431 493

1. Mám, co mám
2. Náš dům zní smíchem

=== 1973 Hana Zagorová - SP ===
Supraphon, SU 431 568

1. Tak si běž
2. On je někdo

=== 1973 Various Artists - Schlagersteine aus Prag (LP) ===
Supraphon, SU 855 295

1. Tanzendes Irrlicht
2. Ich bin dein unbekanntes Gluck

=== 1973 Various Artists - Kytice (3LP) ===
Supraphon, SU 1131 513-15

1. Bludička
2. Vodník

=== 1973 Various Artists - Zlatý Slavík 1972 (LP) ===
Supraphon, SU 1131 366

1. Až já budu bohatá

=== 1974 Hana Zagorová - SP ===
Supraphon, SU 431 673

1. Já znám ten balzám
2. Já se vznáším

=== 1974 Hana Zagorová - SP ===
Supraphon, SU 431 692

1. Tvá žena Růžena
2. Začnou hrát

=== 1974 Hana Zagorová - SP ===
Supraphon, SU 431 709

1. Skončil bál
2. Kluk, na kterého můžu dát (Byla to glupa milosc)

=== 1975 Hana Zagorová - SP ===
Supraphon, SU 431 809

1. Víckrát nelez přes můj práh (I´ve Got Texas in my Heart)
2. Štěstí

=== 1975 Hana Zagorová - SP ===
Supraphon, SU 431 819

1. Breviář lásky
2. Noc je ještě příliš mladá

=== 1975 Hana Zagorová - SP ===
Supraphon, SU 431 847

1. Asi, asi (Honey, Honey) (w/Petr Rezek)
2. Dávám kabát na věšák

=== 1975 Hana Zagorová - SP ===
Supraphon, SU 431 882

1. Kamarád
2. Už se připozdívá

=== 1975 Hana Zagorová - SP ===
Supraphon, SU 431 901

1. Zima, zima, zima, zima
2. Znám tvůj trik

=== 1975 Hana Zagorová - SP ===
Supraphon, SU 431 934

1. Svážu stuhou déšť
2. Prý je mu líp

=== 1975 Various Artists - 10/45 na '76 (LP) ===
Supraphon, SU 1930 405

1. Řeka zázraků

=== 1976 Hana Zagorová - Cesta ke Štěstí (LP) ===
Supraphon, SU 1113 1720 H

1. Cesta ke štěstí
2. Ať si šeptají
3. Svět náš
4. Prý je mu líp
5. Řeka zázraků
6. Soucit
7. Studánko stříbrná
8. Vlaštovčí hnízdo
9. Kdo ví, kde usínáš a s kým
10. Jsi mrtvá sezóna
11. Když písně lžou

=== 1976 Hana Zagorová - SP ===
Supraphon, SU 1431 961

1. Já mám pár tónů
2. Můj sen je touha žít (Vado via)

=== 1976 Hana Zagorová - SP ===
Supraphon, SU 1432 005

1. Žízeň (S.O.S.)
2. Maluj zase obrázky

=== 1976 Hana Zagorová - SP ===
Supraphon, SU 1432 016

1. Když písně lžou
2. Soucit

=== 1976 Hana Zagorová - SP ===
Supraphon, SU 1432 023

1. Louka vábí (Die Kunigunde)
2. Byl to víc než přítel můj

=== 1976 Hana Zagorová - SP ===
Supraphon, SU 1432 030

1. Vánoční tajemství (w/Petr Rezek)
2. A v noci bude mráz

=== 1976 Various Artists - XV. Album Supraphonu (LP) ===
Supraphon, SU 1131 907

1. Asi, asi (Honey, Honey) (w/Petr Rezek)

=== 1976 Various Artists - Václav Hybš a Jeho Hosté (LP) ===
Supraphon, SU 1131 917

1. Lojzo, Lojzku, Lojzíku
2. Pepi, ty jsi můj (w/L. Kozderková, M. Zahrynowská, H. Talpová, M. Voborníková)

=== 1976 Various Artists - 30 Let N.P. Supraphon (LP) ===
Supraphon, SU 1131 969

1. Bludička Julie

=== 1976 Various Artists - Studio Supraphon 1 (LP) ===
Supraphon, SU 1132 123

1. Bludička Julie

=== 1977 Hana Zagorová - SP ===
Supraphon, SU 1432 081

1. Oheň a struny
2. Tak to jsem já

=== 1977 Hana Zagorová - SP ===
Supraphon, SU 1432 088

1. Málokdo ví (Sambario)
2. Duhová víla (w/Petr Rezek)

=== 1977 Hana Zagorová - SP ===
Supraphon, SU 1432 142

1. Nevím, nevím
2. Sám jsi šel

=== 1977 Hana Zagorová - SP ===
Supraphon, SU 1432 155

1. Telegram (Telegram)
2. Jaká jsem

=== 1977 Hana Zagorová - SP ===
Supraphon, SU 1432 030

1. Vánoční tajemství (w/Petr Rezek)
2. A v noci bude mráz

=== 1977 Various Artists - Hvězdy Pop Music 18 (MC) ===
Supraphon, SU C49 18

1. Studánko stříbrná
2. Prý je mu líp

=== 1977 Various Artists - Hvězdy Pop Music 20 (MC) ===
Supraphon, SU C51 20

1. Řeka zázraků

=== 1978 Hana Zagorová - SP ===
Supraphon, SU 1432 165

1. Královnička
2. Madam Currie (Michal Prokop only)

=== 1978 Hana Zagorová - SP ===
Supraphon, SU 1432 175

1. Láska zůstává
2. Jen tak

=== 1978 Hana Zagorová - SP ===
Supraphon, SU 1432 182

1. Píseň labutí
2. Dotazník (Rock Bottom) (w/Petr Rezek)

=== 1978 Hana Zagorová - SP ===
Supraphon, SU 1432 206

1. Pojď, kdo máš mě rád
2. Teď, když mám kam jít (Jiří Štědron only)

=== 1978 Hana Zagorová - SP ===
Supraphon, SU 1432 218

1. Proč ti na tom tak záleží
2. Zdá se

=== 1978 Various Artists - Jezdec Formule Život (LP) ===
Supraphon, SU 1132 384

1. Jezdec formule život

=== 1979 Hana Zagorová - Tobě, Tebe, Ti (LP) ===
Supraphon, SU 1132 436

1. Melodram
2. Zdá se
3. Snad nezapomněl
4. Hani, nebuď jak malinká
5. Nevím
6. Čas nezralých malin
7. Honey
8. Baron Prášil
9. Závrať
10. Na pátou ránvej
11. Tam, kam sokoli létají
12. Kapky

=== 1979 Hana Zagorová - Breviary of Love (LP) ===
Supraphon, SU 1113 2489

1. Young love (Cesta ke štěstí)
2. I´ve a pal (Kamarád)
3. You drew portraits (Maluj zase obrázky)
4. Some one who's meant for me
5. Life's magic stream
6. My little wishing well (Studánko Stříbrná)
7. Rainbow fairy (Duhová víla) (w/Petr Rezek)
8. You're just a memory (Jsi mrtvá sezóna)
9. Breviary of love (Breviář lásky)
10. He's better now (Prý je mu líp)
11. The show must go on

=== 1979 Various Artists - EP ===
Supraphon, SU 11 899 810

1. Hranice světel a stínů (w/Petr Rezek)

=== 1979 Hana Zagorová - SP ===
Supraphon, SU 1432 272

1. Přítel čas
2. Nejspíš nespíš

=== 1979 Hana Zagorová - SP ===
Supraphon, SU 1432 293

1. Ta pusa je tvá (Stumblin' in) (w/Petr Rezek)
2. Kosmický sen

=== 1979 Various Artists - Spívají Listy Bříz (LP) ===
Supraphon

1. Kluk z 1.A

=== 1979 Various Artists - XVIII. Album Supraphonu (LP) ===
Supraphon, SU 1132 565

1. Telegram (Telegram)
2. Zdá se

=== 1979 Various Artists - Malovaný Džbánek (LP) ===
Supraphon

1. Až já budu bohatá

=== 1979 Various Artists - Hvězdolet 06 (LP) ===
Supraphon, SU 1132 516

1. Co nás láká (w/H. Vondráčková, M. Rottrová, J. Korn, V. Neckář, J. Schellinger)
2. Pojď, kdo máš mě rád
3. Hej, dívky z Prahy 5 (w/Helena Vondráčková, Marie Rottrová)

=== 1979 Various Artists - Koktail z PKO (LP) ===
Supraphon, SU 911 60929

1. Zdá se

=== 1979 Various Artists - Orchestr ČST Uvadí (LP) ===
Supraphon, SU 192 303 27

1. Jestli se rozzlobím, budu zlá
2. Bída

=== 1980 Various Artists - Přátelská Setkání #1 (LP) ===
Supraphon, SU 1113 2758

1. To, co bylo, neplatí
2. Setkání
3. Láska v desátém semestru

=== 1980 Hana Zagorová - Oheň v Duši Mé (LP) ===
Supraphon, SU 1113 2738

1. Líto, je mi líto
2. Zásnuby
3. Tam pod naší strání
4. Srdce mé bláhové
5. Bloudím mapou vzpomínek
6. Povídej si se mnou, abych neplakala
7. To jsi ty
8. Perný den
9. Víš, co je most
10. Oheň
11. Doktore, au
12. Pane vrchní, platím
13. Oheň v duši mé

=== 1980 Hana Zagorová - SP ===
Supraphon, SU 11432 340

1. Setkání (Incontro) (w/Drupi)
2. Kam jsi to letět chtěl, ptáčku můj

=== 1980 Hana Zagorová - SP ===
Supraphon, SU 11432 352

1. Náskok
2. Kdyby se vrátil čas

=== 1980 Hana Zagorová - SP ===
Supraphon, SU 11432 407

1. Rýmy (Save me)
2. Láska v desátém semestru

=== 1980 Hana Zagorová - SP ===
Supraphon, SU 11432 438

1. Dávné lásky (w/Karel Gott)
2. Benjamin

=== 1980 Various Artists - Vzhůru k Výškám (LP) ===
Supraphon, SU 11 132 605

1. Zdá se

=== 1980 Various Artists - Haló, Tady Orchestr a Balet ČST (LP) ===
Supraphon, SU 11 132 708

1. Bída

=== 1981 Hana Zagorová - Střípky (LP) ===
Supraphon, SU 1113 2944 ZA

1. Usnul nám, spí
2. Nevěřím ti
3. Benjamin
4. Oceán
5. Opona
6. Píseň lásky tlampač z dáli hrál
7. Setkání (Incontro) (w/Drupi)
8. Lásko, amore (w/Juraj Kukura)
9. Dvě žlutá kuřátka (Piano Jack and Dixieland) (w/Helena Vondráčková)
10. Zákaz předjíždění (w/Petr Rezek)
11. Vyhrát se dá (w/Jiří Korn)
12. Dávné lásky (w/Karel Gott)

=== 1981 Hana Zagorová - SP ===
Supraphon, SU 11432 473

1. Diskohrátky (The Locomotion)
2. Usnul nám, spí

=== 1981 Hana Zagorová - SP ===
Supraphon, SU 11432 500

1. Lásko, amore
2. Nech brouka žít (Juraj Kukura only)

=== 1981 Hana Zagorová - SP ===
Supraphon, SU 11432 535

1. Pátek (Tuesday)
2. Jablko sváru

=== 1981 Various Artists - Hvězdy Pop Music 27 (MC) ===
Supraphon, SU C60 61

1. Benjamin
2. Vyhrát se dá (w/Jiří Korn)

=== 1981 Various Artists - 13x Zdeněk Marat (LP) ===
Supraphon, SU 11 132 893

1. Ty jsi jednoho dne přišel na můj práh

=== 1981 Various Artists - Nádherná Přátelství (LP) ===
Supraphon, SU 11 139 948

1. Mé lásky, to jsou svátky

=== 1981 Various Artists - Benefice TORČ Praha-J. Vobruba (2LP) ===
Supraphon, SU 11 133 061-2

1. On je někdo

=== 1982 Hana Zagorová - Světlo a Stín (LP) ===
Supraphon, SU 1113 3070

1. Láska je počasí
2. Tak ty ses vrátil
3. Biograf láska
4. Jedu s vámi
5. Jako zlatý déšť
6. Narozeniny
7. Stáří (Miss You Tonite)
8. Příboj
9. Anonym (My Old Pal)
10. Počítadlo lásky (uncredited: Petr Kotvald, Stanislav Hložek)
11. Ještě chvíli
12. Žízeň po životě

=== 1982 Hana Zagorová - SP ===
Supraphon, SU 11432 563

1. Nápad (Everybody's Rockin´)
2. Sloky trochu smutné lásky

=== 1982 Hana Zagorová - SP ===
Supraphon, SU 11432 587

1. Mimořádná linka (Praha - Tokio) (Japonese Boy)
2. Počítadlo lásky

=== 1982 Various Artists - Hvězdy Pop Music 28 (MC) ===
Supraphon, SU C60 62

1. Pátek (Tuesday)
2. Diskohrátky (The Locomotion)

=== 1982 Various Artists - Písničky ze Studiu A (MC) ===
Supraphon, SU 192 303 93

1. Půl štěstí
2. Můj zůstaň

=== 1983 Various Artists - Tisíckrát Vyprodáno (Přátelská Setkání #2) (LP) ===
Supraphon, SU 1113 3237 ZA

1. Malování ve snu
2. Auťák na lásku (w/Petr Kotvald, Stanislav Hložek)
3. Počestní, nečestní
4. Otvírání psaní
5. Apríl (w/Karel Gott)

=== 1983 Hana Zagorová - Mimořádná Linka (LP) ===
Supraphon, SU 1113 3347 ZA

1. Diskohrátky (The Locomotion)
2. Líto, je mi líto (Vendo tutto)
3. Benjamin
4. Já vím (Nie mehr...)
5. Vím málo (She's Always a Woman)
6. Proč nejsi větší (I am the Lady)
7. Mimořádná linka (Praha - Tokio) (Japonese Boy)
8. Ty nejsi zralý (Rosie) (w/Petr Kotvald, Stanislav Hložek)
9. Usnul nám, spí
10. Kosmický sen
11. Kočičí píseň (The Old Gumbie Cat) (w/Petr Kotvald, Stanislav Hložek)
12. Nápad (Everybody's Rockin´)

=== 1983 Hana Zagorová - EP ===
Supraphon, SU 11 330 586

1. Kostky jsou vrženy (w/Petr Kotvald, Stanislav Hložek)
2. Biograf láska
3. Černý páv (Hard To Say I'm Sorry) (w/Petr Kotvald, Stanislav Hložek)
4. Proč nejsi větší (I am the Lady)

=== 1983 Various Artists - Duhová Víla (Přátelská Setkání #3) (LP) ===
Supraphon, SU 1113 3420

1. Modrý ostrov snů (w/Petr Kotvald, Stanislav Hložek)
2. He's so shy (Buenaventura)
3. Hej, mistře basů (Mr. Bass Man) (w/Karel Vágner)
4. Můj den zítřejší (Out Here on my Own)
5. Duhová víla (w/Petr Rezek)
6. Koncert (w/Petr Kotvald, Stanislav Hložek)
7. To by nebylo fér (I Found my Way Home) (w/Petr Kotvald, Stanislav Hložek)
8. Bída

=== 1983 Petr Kotvald, Stanislav Hložek - Holky z Naší Školky (LP) ===
Supraphon, SU 1113 3245

1. Hej, taste (Mickey) (w/Petr Kotvald, Stanislav Hložek)
2. Auťák na lásku (w/Petr Kotvald, Stanislav Hložek)

=== 1983 Hana Zagorová - SP ===
Supraphon, SU 11432 736

1. To by nebylo fér (I found my way home) (w/Petr Kotvald, Stanislav Hložek)
2. Auťák na lásku (w/Petr Kotvald, Stanislav Hložek)

=== 1983 Hana Zagorová - SP ===
Supraphon, SU 11432 811

1. Buldok (Ping Pong) (w/Petr Kotvald, Stanislav Hložek)
2. Dáme autu trochu pít

=== 1983 Hana Zagorová - SP ===
Supraphon, SU 11432 689

1. Spěchám (Queen of Hearts) (w/Petr Kotvald, Stanislav Hložek)
2. Apríl (w/Karel Gott)

=== 1983 Petr Rezek - Modrá Zem (LP) ===
Supraphon, SU 1113 3259

1. Duhová víla (w/Petr Rezek)
2. Ta pusa je tvá (Stumblin' in) (w/Petr Rezek)

=== 1983 Various Artists - XXII. Album Supraphonu (LP) ===
Supraphon, SU 1113 3230

1. Spěchám (Queen of Hearts) (w/Petr Kotvald, Stanislav Hložek)
2. Příboj

=== 1984 Hana Zagorová - EP ===
Supraphon, SU 11330 587

1. Máj je máj (uncredited: Petr Kotvald, Stanislav Hložek)
2. Hotel Avion (w/Petr Kotvald, Stanislav Hložek)
3. Všichni jsme stejní
4. Právo žít (Petr Kotvald, Stanislav Hložek only)

=== 1984 Hana Zagorová - Co Stalo se, Stalo (LP) ===
Supraphon, SU 1113 3469 ZA

1. Křižovatka 6
2. Dneska už to vím (w/Petr Kotvald, Stanislav Hložek)
3. Co ti brání v pousmání (uncredited: Petr Kotvald, Stanislav Hložek)
4. Skála (w/Petr Kotvald, Stanislav Hložek)
5. Co stalo se, stalo
6. Stvořená k lásce (w/Petr Kotvald, Stanislav Hložek)
7. Zvonková pouť
8. Maják (To Love)
9. Čas celou noc
10. Ztracená
11. Řekni třikrát lásko
12. Už dlouho se mi zdáš
13. Všichni jsme stejní

=== 1984 Hana Zagorová - SP ===
Supraphon, SU 11432 845

1. Polibek (w/Petr Kotvald, Stanislav Hložek)
2. Dneska už to vím (w/Petr Kotvald, Stanislav Hložek)

=== 1984 Hana Zagorová - SP ===
Supraphon, SU 11432 920

1. Jinak to nejde (Guardian Angel) (w/Petr Kotvald, Stanislav Hložek)
2. Ahoj, léto (w/Petr Kotvald, Stanislav Hložek)

=== 1984 Hana Zagorová - SP ===
Supraphon, SU 11432 926

1. Kam jdou (Hello)
2. Krásky (Petr Kotvald, Stanislav Hložek only)

=== 1984 Hana Zagorová - SP ===
Supraphon, SU 11432 949

1. Můj čas (w/Petr Kotvald, Stanislav Hložek)
2. Sanitka (ORM only, instrumental)

=== 1984 Various Artists - XXIII. Album Supraphonu (LP) ===
Supraphon, SU 11133 495

1. Polibek (Piccolo Amore) (w/Petr Kotvald, Stanislav Hložek)
2. To by nebylo fér (I found my way home) (w/Petr Kotvald, Stanislav Hložek)

=== 1985 Various Artists - The Cinema of Stars (LP) ===
Supraphon, SU 1113 3840

1. Queen of hearts (Spěchám) (w/Petr Kotvald, Stanislav Hložek)
2. Take me for the ride tonight (Počítadlo lásky)
3. Love car (Auťák na lásku) (w/Petr Kotvald, Stanislav Hložek)
4. Cinema of love (Biograf láska)
5. The locomotion (Diskohrátky)

=== 1985 Hana Zagorová - Sítě Kroků Tvých (LP) ===
Supraphon, SU 1113 3740 ZA

1. Hej
2. Poslední z posledních
3. Nic jí neschází (w/Petr Kotvald, Stanislav Hložek)
4. Noční dopis
5. Starosti
6. Sláva, je bál (Niech žyje bal)
7. Co mám ze své výhry
8. Maxitaxi
9. Nešlap, nelámej
10. Zločin století
11. Když svítím
12. Ztracená píseň
13. Sítě kroků tvých (Sulla tua pelle)

=== 1985 Various Artists - SP ===
Supraphon, SU 11433 148

1. Nejhezčí dárek 1. díl (w/Helena Vondráčková, Petr Kotvald, Stanislav Hložek, etc.)
2. Nejhezčí dárek 2. díl (w/Iveta Bartošová, Michal David, Petra Janů, etc.)

=== 1985 Hana Zagorová - Lávky (2LP) ===
Supraphon, SU 1113 4141-42 ZA

==== LP1 ====
1. Honey (Honey)
2. Obraz smutný slečny
3. Mrtvá láska
4. Bludička Julie
5. Gvendolína
6. Breviář lásky
7. Já jsem tvá neznámá
8. Studánko stříbrná
9. Cesta ke štěstí
10. Tam pod naší strání
11. Zdá se
12. On je někdo
13. Kdyby se vrátil čas
14. Kamarád

==== LP2 ====
1. Maluj zase obrázky
2. Duhová víla
3. Líto, je mi líto (Vendo tutto)
4. Málokdo ví (Sambario)
5. Závrať
6. Setkání
7. Vím málo (She's Always a Woman)
8. Počítadlo lásky
9. Biograf láska
10. Usnul nám, spí
11. Nápad (Everybody's Rockin´)
12. Černý páv (Hard To Say I'm Sorry) (w/Petr Kotvald, Stanislav Hložek)
13. Spěchám (Queen of Hearts) (w/Petr Kotvald, Stanislav Hložek)

=== 1985 Hana Zagorová, Petr Kotvald, Stanislav Hložek - Jinak To Nejde (LP) ===
Supraphon, SU 1113 3844

1. Nešlap, nelámej
2. Přání (w/Stanislav Hložek)
3. Až budou kytky umět psát
4. Jinak to nejde (Guardian Angel) (w/Petr Kotvald, Stanislav Hložek)
5. Má pohádková země
6. Lásko kolem nás
7. Kdo má rád (I Don't Want to Talk About It)

=== 1985 Various Artists - Dvanáct Sezón (LP) ===
Supraphon, SU 1113 3570

1. V průvanu (w/Petr Kotvald, Stanislav Hložek)
2. Kluk z příštího století (Almost Paradise) (w/Stanislav Hložek)
3. Mám tě ráda, jsi přítel můj (w/Petr Kotvald, Stanislav Hložek, VOX, etc.)

=== 1985 Petr Kotvald, Stanislav Hložek - Pro Dva Tři Úsměvy (LP) ===
Supraphon, SU 1113 3739

1. Pro dva tři úsměvy (w/Petr Kotvald, Stanislav Hložek)

=== 1985 Hana Zagorová - SP ===
Supraphon, SU 11432 986

1. Džínovej kluk (Girls Just Want to Have Fun)
2. Potulní kejklíři (w/Petr Kotvald, Stanislav Hložek)

=== 1985 Hana Zagorová - SP ===
Supraphon, SU 11433 012

1. Hej, mistře basů (Mr. Bass Man) (w/Karel Vágner)
2. Nic jí neschází (w/Petr Kotvald, Stanislav Hložek)

=== 1985 Hana Zagorová - SP ===
Supraphon, SU 11433 028

1. Kluk z příštího století (Almost Paradise) (w/Stanislav Hložek)
2. Mám tě ráda, jsi přítel můj (w/Petr Kotvald, Stanislav Hložek, VOX, etc.)

=== 1985 Hana Zagorová - SP ===
Supraphon, SU 11433 070

1. Co já vím (w/Karel Gott)
2. Má pohádková země

=== 1985 Hana Zagorová - SP ===
Supraphon, SU 11433 083

1. Letní kluci
2. Ztracená píseň

=== 1985 Hana Zagorová - SP ===
Supraphon, SU 11433 148

1. Nešlap, nelámej
2. Je tu doba dešťů

=== 1985 Various Artists - Hvězdy Pop Music 33 (MC) ===
Supraphon, SU C60 75

1. Pátek (Tuesday)
2. Diskohrátky (The Locomotion)

=== 1985 Various Artists - Písničky z Obrazovky (LP) ===
Supraphon, SU 1113 3094

1. Auťák na lásku (w/Petr Kotvald, Stanislav Hložek)

=== 1985 Various Artists - Praha-Moskva 1985 (LP) ===
Supraphon, SU 1113 3856

1. Biograf láska

=== 1985 Various Artists - Mys Dobrých Nadějí (LP) ===
Supraphon, SU 1113 3870

1. Mys dobrých nadějí
2. Co stalo se, stalo

=== 1985 Various Artists - Tip Top 1 (LP) ===
Supraphon, SU 1113 3787

1. Můj čas

=== 1986 Various Artists - Naše Láska Ztrácí L (LP) ===
Supraphon, SU 1113 4367

1. Psáno láskou
2. Óda na život
3. Naše láska ztrácí L
4. Velikánský umění (w/Stanislav Hložek)

=== 1986 Hana Zagorová - Náhlá Loučení (LP) ===
Supraphon, SU 113 3949 ZA

1. Náhlá loučení
2. Jako nemluvně
3. Já ti mávám (w/Karel Vágner)
4. Druhá láska
5. Byl jsi tak jiný
6. Sbohem, dobrá firmo
7. Jízda
8. Neříkej mi
9. Láska na inzerát
10. Touhy
11. Tvá kočka
12. Už se mi nechce jít dál

=== 1986 Hana Zagorová - SP ===
Supraphon, SU 1143 3141

1. Já o něm vím své (I Know Him So Well) (w/Petra Janů)
2. Jízda

=== 1986 Hana Zagorová - SP ===
Supraphon, SU 1143 3176

1. Tu, tu (w/Petr Kotvald, Stanislav Hložek)
2. Zlato

=== 1986 Hana Zagorová - SP ===
Supraphon, SU 1143 3289

1. Naše láska ztrácí L
2. Velikánský umění (w/Stanislav Hložek)

=== 1986 Hana Zagorová - SP ===
Supraphon, SU 1143 3305

1. Dobré jitro
2. Jako nemluvně

=== 1986 Hana Zagorová - SP ===
Supraphon, SU 1143 3331

1. Uspávanka
2. Vem si kousek vůně (I. Snopková only)

=== 1986 Hana Zagorová - SP ===
Supraphon, SU 1143 3227

1. Jen jedenkrát v roce (Einmal im Winter) (w/Petr Kotvald, Stanislav Hložek)
2. Já přišel přát (Stanislav Hložek only)

=== 1986 Petr Kotvald, Stanislav Hložek - Feeling Good (LP) ===
Supraphon, SU 103990 1311

1. Love Car (Auťák na lásku) (w/Petr Kotvald, Stanislav Hložek)
2. My time (Můj čas) (w/Petr Kotvald, Stanislav Hložek)

=== 1986 Stanislav Hložek - Za To Může Déšť, Ne Já (LP) ===
Supraphon, SU 1113 3948

1. Velikánský umění (w/Stanislav Hložek)

=== 1986 Various Artists - Nejhezčí Dárek (LP) ===
Supraphon, SU 1113 4368

1. Naše láska ztrácí L
2. Už se mi nechce jít dál
3. Nejhezčí dárek (w/various artists)

=== 1986 Various Artists - Tip Top 2 (LP) ===
Supraphon, SU 1113 3788

1. Nešlap, nelámej
2. Jinak to nejde (Guardian Angel) (w/Petr Kotvald, Stanislav Hložek)

=== 1986 Various Artists - XXIV. Album Supraphonu (LP) ===
Supraphon, SU 1113 4079

1. Můj čas (w/Petr Kotvald, Stanislav Hložek)
2. Letní kluci

=== 1986 Various Artists - Biograf Láska (MC) ===
Supraphon, SU C60 72

1. Biograf láska

=== 1986 Various Artists - Breviář Lásky-Písně Jiřího Zmožka 2 (MC) ===
Supraphon, SU C60 55

1. Křižovatka 6
2. Nešlap, nelámej
3. Breviář lásky

=== 1986 Various Artists - 20 Nej... #9 (MC) ===
Supraphon, SU 192 339 99

1. Nic jí neschází (w/Petr Kotvald, Stanislav Hložek)

=== 1986 Various Artists - 20 Nej... #10 (MC) ===
Supraphon, SU 192 340 00

1. Nešlap, nelámej

=== 1986 Various Artists - Dálnice (MC) ===
Supraphon, SU 192 340 16

1. Spěchám (Queen of Hearts) (w/Petr Kotvald, Stanislav Hložek)
2. Dáme autu trochu pít

=== 1986 Various Artists - Diskohrátky Pionýrské Vlaštovky (LP) ===
Supraphon

1. Biograf láska

=== 1987 Various Artists - Speciál Team (LP) ===
Supraphon, SU 1113 4199

1. Kousek cesty s tebou
2. Dáma s diplomem
3. Tam, kde schází terminál (w/Stanislav Hložek)

=== 1987 Various Artists - Dluhy Hany Zagorové (LP) ===
Supraphon, SU 1113 4184

1. Je tu doba dešťů
2. Starci na chmelu (w/Petr Kotvald, Stanislav Hložek)
3. Hany s ofinou (w/Vlastimil Harapes)
4. Kontakt (w/Petr Kotvald, Stanislav Hložek)
5. Zlato
6. Vlaštovčí hnízdo (w/Karel Gott, Vlastimil Harapes)
7. Udělej si prima den (w/Stanislav Hložek)

=== 1987 Hana Zagorová - SP ===
Supraphon, SU 1143 3363

1. Kousek cesty s tebou
2. Tam, kde schází terminál (w/Stanislav Hložek)

=== 1987 Hana Zagorová - SP ===
Supraphon, SU 1143 3463

1. Živá voda
2. Jako jindy

=== 1987 Hana Zagorová - SP ===
Supraphon, SU 1143 3499

1. Mám plán
2. Skleněné sny

=== 1987 Hana Zagorová - SP ===
Supraphon, SU 1143 3510

1. Boty proti lásce
2. Chvíli jsem balónem

=== 1987 Various Artists - Kousek Cesty s Tebou (LP) ===
Supraphon, SU 1113 4438

1. Kousek cesty s tebou
2. Slušných lidí je víc (w/Stanislav Hložek)

=== 1987 Various Artists - XXV. Album Supraphonu (LP) ===
Supraphon, SU 1113 4244

1. Kousek cesty s tebou

=== 1987 Various Artists - ECHO (LP) ===
Supraphon, SU 1113 4199

1. Velikánský umění (w/Stanislav Hložek)

=== 1988 Hana Zagorová - Živá Voda (LP, CD) ===
Supraphon, SU 1113 4183

1. Srážka s láskou
2. Větroplach
3. Už si nevzpomínám
4. S loudilem v patách
5. Skleněné sny
6. Chvíli jsem balónem
7. Bourá se dům (w/Jan Neckář)
8. Drápkem se zachytím
9. Smiřování
10. Jako jindy
11. Zemětřesení
12. Velká krádež
13. Živá voda

=== 1988 Various Artists - Šmoulové (LP) ===
Supraphon, SU 110317 1311

1. Šmoulová země
2. Šmoulí song (w/Stanislav Hložek, Jiří Korn, Darina Rolincová, Karel Gott, etc.)

=== 1988 Various Artists - Dny Jdou (LP) ===
Supraphon, SU 110152 1311

1. Zpráva všem holubům

=== 1988 Hana Zagorová - SP ===
Supraphon, SU 110082 7311

1. Jsou tu lidi
2. Zpráva všem holubům

=== 1988 Hana Zagorová - SP ===
Supraphon, SU 110197 7311

1. Šmoulová země
2. Pracovní šou (Petra Janů only)

=== 1988 Various Artists - Malovaný Večírek (LP) ===
Supraphon, SU 110147 1311

1. Nešlap, nelámej
2. Živá voda

=== 1988 Various Artists - Jasná Zpráva (LP) ===
Supraphon, SU 110071 1311

1. Narozeniny

=== 1988 Various Artists - Karel Svoboda: Písně a Filmové Melodie 1966-88 (2LP) ===
Supraphon, SU 110315 1312/110316 1312

1. Gvendolína
2. Studánko stříbrná

=== 1988 Richard Müller - V Penzionu Svet (LP) ===
Supraphon, SU 104236 1311

1. Milostný dopis Haně Z. (w/Richard Müller)

=== 1989 Hana Zagorová - SP ===
Supraphon, SU 110251 7311

1. Rybičko zlatá, přeju si
2. Modrá čajovna

=== 1989 Various Artists - Vaprávění o Šmoulech (LP) ===
Supraphon, re-release, SU 110592 1811

1. Šmoulová země
2. Šmoulí song (w/Stanislav Hložek, Jiří Korn, Darina Rolincová, Karel Gott, etc.)

=== 1989 Various Artists - Jambo Karla Vágnera (LP) ===
Supraphon, SU 110432 1311

1. Já nevím jak
2. Modrá čajovna

=== 1989 Various Artists - XXVI. Album Supraphonu (LP) ===
Supraphon, SU 110175 1311

1. Skleněné sny

=== 1989 Various Artists - Hity '89 (CD) ===
N/A, 710 665-2

1. Rybičko zlatá, přeju si

=== 1989 Richard Müller - V Penzionu Svet (CD) ===
Supraphon, SU 104236 2311

1. Milostný dopis Haně Z. (w/Richard Müller)

=== 1990 Various Artists - Tom a Jerry (LP) ===
Miltisonic, 310002 1311

1. Tom a Jerry

=== 1990 Various Artists - Šmoulové a Gargamel (LP) ===
Supraphon, SU 110848 1311

1. Kočičí svátek - Asrael

=== 1990 Hana Zagorová - Dnes Nejsem Doma (LP) ===
Supraphon, SU 110149 1311 ZA

1. Andělé
2. Modrá čajovna
3. A kdo jsem já
4. Měsíc je den ode dne krásnější
5. Dnes nejsem doma
6. Podivný bar
7. Buď vůle tvá (Where is it Written?)
8. Rybičko zlatá, přeju si
9. Půlnoc
10. Kufr
11. Stíny
12. Čas odejít

=== 1990 Hana Zagorová - SP ===
Supraphon, SU 110403 7311

1. Beránek (Koleda s pretensjami)
2. Skanzen bídy

=== 1990 Various Artists - XXVII. Album Supraphonu (LP) ===
Supraphon, SU 110478 1311

1. Rybičko zlatá, přeju si

=== 1990 Various Artists - Křesťanské Songy a Podobenství (LP) ===
Multisonic, 310001 1311

1. Přichází doba tajných přání

=== 1991 Hana Zagorová - Rozhovor v Tichu (LP, CD) ===
Multisonic, LP 310117 1311, CD 310117 2311

1. Rozhovor v tichu
2. Křest ohněm
3. Merilyn
4. Vzdálení (Every Time You Say Good-bye)
5. Vím, že se díváš
6. Neznámé zálivy
7. Jako starý strom
8. Říční kámen
9. Moře samoty
10. Žena za tvými zády
11. Obraz
12. Neodcházej

=== 1991 Hana Zagorová - SP ===
Multisonic, #310068 7311

1. Pěšáci z front
2. Jako starý strom

=== 1991 Hana Zagorová - SP ===
Multisonic, #310102 7311

1. Pofoukej mi jahody
2. S.O.S. blues (Karel Černoch only)

=== 1991 Various Artists - XXVIII. Album Supraphonu (LP) ===
Supraphon, SU 110861 1311

1. Modrá čajovna

=== 1991 Various Artists - Písničky z Rosy (CD) ===
Mutisonic, #3101151 2331

1. Tom a Jerry

=== 1992 Various Artists - Želvy Ninja (CD) ===
Multisonic, #310177 2331

1. Pět mušketýrů

=== 1992 Various Artists - 46 Hitů K. Svobody (2CD) ===
N/A, #111756 2312

1. Gvendolína
2. Studánko stříbrná

=== 1992 Various Artists - Staň se Růží (CD) ===
N/A, #111773 2311

1. Já chtěla jsem ti báseň psát

=== 1993 Various Artists - Písničky pro Barbie (CD) ===
Tommü Records, #310165 2331

1. Máš, co nemá žádná
2. Prvně sama

=== 1993 Various Artists - Hity 1974 (CD) ===
N/A, #111670 2331

1. Já se vznáším

=== 1993 Various Artists - Hity 1984 (CD) ===
N/A, #111758 2331

1. Jinak to nejde (Guardian Angel) 1984 (w/Petr Kotvald, Stanislav Hložek)

=== 1993 Various Artists - Dimantová Deska (Ladislav Štaidl) (CD) ===
N/A, #112525 2312

1. Když písně lžou

=== 1993 Various Artists - Tip Top Gold 70 (CD) ===
N/A, #111753 2331

1. Duhová víla (w/Petr Rezek)

=== 1994 Hana Zagorová - Když Nemůžu Spát (CD) ===
Tommü Records, total time: 41:46, TR 610075-4331, AAD/ADD stereo

1. Kdo ví, kde usínáš 1993
2. Přijď aspoň na chvíli 1993 (w/Boris Rösner)
3. Den jako obrázek 1993 (w/Helena Růžičková)
4. Padám, když svítá 1994
5. Hra na pravdu 1993 (w/Dáša Veškrnová)
6. Mží 1994 (w/Karel Gott)
7. Jen já a sen 1994
8. Hej, mistře basů (Mr. Bass Man) 1983 (w/Karel Vágner)
9. Já o něm vím své (I Know Him so Well) 1985 (w/Petra Janů)
10. Noční dopis 1994
11. Lítat jako pták 1994 (w/Michal David)
12. Ave Maria 1994 (w/Štefan Margita)

=== 1994 Hana Zagorová, Štefan Margita - Ave (CD) ===
Multisonic

1. Ave Maria
2. Chválím den sváteční
3. Tvá hvězda vánoční
4. Bože, tohle jsi chtěl
5. Směs vánočních koled
6. Kdo se zítra narodíš
7. Jen jedenkrát v roce
8. Směs vánočních koled II

=== 1994 Various Artists - Písničky z Rosy 3 (CD) ===
Multisonic, #310260 2331

1. Pofoukej mi jahody
2. Malý ponny
3. Zlatovláska

=== 1994 Various Artists - Poníkové Království (CD) ===
N/A, #610076 2331

1. Poník Špína
2. Poníkové království

=== 1994 Various Artists - Želvy Ninja 2 (CD) ===
Multisonic

1. Mutagenní ukolébavka

=== 1994 Various Artists - Hity 1968 (CD) ===
N/A, #111579 2331

1. Obraz smutný slečny

=== 1994 Various Artists - Hity 1969 (CD) ===
N/A, #111581 2331

1. Bludička Julie

=== 1994 Various Artists - Hity 1971 (CD) ===
N/A, #111591 2331

1. Já jsem tvá neznámá

=== 1994 Various Artists - Hity 1972 (CD) ===
N/A, #112600 2331

1. Náš dům zní smíchem
2. Sliby, chyby

=== 1995 Hana Zagorová - Maluj Zase Obrázky (CD) ===
Multisonic

1. Maluj zase obrázky
2. Biograf láska
3. Nápad
4. Nešlap, nelámej
5. Já se vznáším
6. Usnul nám, spí
7. Spěchám
8. Studánko stříbrná
9. Zdá se
10. Málokdo ví
11. Cesta ke štěstí
12. Duhová víla
13. Honey
14. Jinak to nejde

=== 1996 Hana Zagorová - Maluj Zase Obrázky II (CD) ===
Multisonic

1. Kdyby se vrátil čas
2. Gvendolína
3. Sloky trochu smutné lásky
4. Modrá čajovna
5. Mys dobrých nadějí
6. Hej, mistře basů
7. To by nebylo fér
8. Beránek
9. Černý páv
10. Kapky
11. Náš dům zní smíchem
12. Co stalo se, stalo
13. Rybičko zlatá, přeju si
14. Zásnuby
15. On je někdo
16. Sláva, je bál

=== 1996 Hana Zagorová, Štefan Margita - Ave II (CD) ===
Multisonic

1. Svítíš mi v tmách
2. Kdybych byla Bůh
3. V mém království
4. Kdyby se vrátil čas
5. On je někdo
6. Roční období
7. Noc dávných přání

=== 1996 Hana Zagorová - Gvendolína 1968-1971 (CD) ===
Bonton Music, total time: 73:11, BON 71-0503-2, AAD stereo

1. Pro panenku 1968
2. Písnička v bílém 1968
3. Kouzelný obraz 1968
4. Poslední šantán 1968
5. Dinda 1968
6. Obraz smutný slečny 1968
7. Cyganicha 1968
8. Jsou v blátivé cestě koleje (Wendowanie) 1968
9. Znám krásný přísloví 1969
10. Honey (Honey) 1969
11. Zum zum zum 1969
12. Miláček (Celui que j'aime) 1969
13. Monolog 1969
14. Písmo maličký 1969
15. Mrtvá láska 1969
16. Černý pasažér 1969
17. Verbíř 1969
18. Rokle 1969
19. Pan Tydlitýt a pan Tydlitát (Tweedle Dee-Tweedle Dum) 1971
20. Nádraží v městečku M. 1971
21. Nemám ráda (Quieres la felicidad, o no) 1971
22. Já jsem tvá neznámá 1971
23. Koho tlačí múra (It's Up to You) 1971
24. Gvendolína 1971

=== 1997 Hana Zagorová - Bludička Julie (CD) ===
Bonton Music, total time: 50:54, BON 71-0589-2, AAD stereo

1. Bludička Julie 1969
2. Bloumat po neznámým pobřeží 1970
3. Zlej kámen 1970
4. Devět poupat 1970
5. Tanečnice 1970
6. Rozhledna 1970
7. Tisíc nových jmen 1969
8. Papá Benjamin 1970
9. Podivín 1970
10. Básník a já 1970
11. Řeka v mém pokoji 1970
12. To bylo léto bláznivý 1970
13. Jean 1969
14. Kočičí slabikář 1969
15. Motýlí žal 1969
16. Dům svalové ztuhlosti 1969

=== 1998 Hana Zagorová, Petr Kotvald, Stanislav Hložek - Jinak to Nejde (CD) ===
Bonton Music, total time: 75:10, BON 491524-2, AAD stereo

1. Potulní kejklíři 1985 (w/Petr Kotvald, Stanislav Hložek)
2. Ahoj, léto 1984 (w/Petr Kotvald, Stanislav Hložek)
3. Hotel Avion 1984 (w/Petr Kotvald, Stanislav Hložek)
4. V průvanu 1984 (w/Petr Kotvald, Stanislav Hložek)
5. Kostky jsou vrženy (Monte Carlo is Great) 1983 (w/Petr Kotvald, Stanislav Hložek)
6. Máj je máj (My oh My) 1984 (uncredited: Petr Kotvald, Stanislav Hložek)
7. Hej, taste (Mickey) 1983 (w/Petr Kotvald, Stanislav Hložek)
8. Pro dva tři úsměvy 1985 (w/Petr Kotvald, Stanislav Hložek)
9. Jinak to nejde (Guardian Angel) 1984 (w/Petr Kotvald, Stanislav Hložek)
10. Starci na chmelu 1986 (w/Petr Kotvald, Stanislav Hložek)
11. Diskohrátky (The locomotion) 1981
12. Modrý ostrov snů 1983 (w/Petr Kotvald, Stanislav Hložek)
13. Spěchám (Queen of Hearts) 1982 (w/Petr Kotvald, Stanislav Hložek)
14. To by nebylo fér (I'll Find my Way Home) 1983 (w/Petr Kotvald, Stanislav Hložek)
15. Tam, kde schází terminál 1986 (w/Stanislav Hložek)
16. Polibek (Piccolo amore) 1984 (w/Petr Kotvald, Stanislav Hložek)
17. Nic jí neschází 1985 (w/Petr Kotvald, Stanislav Hložek)
18. Buldok (Ping Pong) 1983 (w/Petr Kotvald, Stanislav Hložek)
19. Džínovej kluk (Girls Just Want to Have Fun) 1984
20. Černý páv (Hard to Say I'm Sorry) 1983 (w/Petr Kotvald, Stanislav Hložek)
21. Můj čas 1984 (w/Petr Kotvald, Stanislav Hložek)
22. Jen jedenkrát v roce (Einmal im Winter) 1986 (w/Petr Kotvald, Stanislav Hložek)

=== 1998 Hana Zagorová - Já? (CD) ===
Multisonic

1. Je t'aime
2. Když tě ztrácím
3. Já chtěla jsem ti báseň psát
4. Dny dětství
5. Na co já tě mám
6. Když jsem vedle tebe
7. Prosím
8. Byl to víc než přítel můj
9. Torza nadějí
10. Přítel splín
11. Slova řeknou málo
12. Podzim má mě rád

=== 1998 Hana Zagorová - Cesta ke Štěstí / Tobě, Tebe, Ti (CD) ===
Bonton Music, total time: 71:05, BON 491044-2, AAD stereo

1. Cesta ke štěstí 1975
2. Svět náš 1975
3. Prý je mu líp 1975
4. Řeka zázraků 1975
5. Soucit 1975
6. Studánko stříbrná 1975
7. Vlaštovčí hnízdo 1975
8. Kdo ví, kde usínáš a s kým 1975
9. Jsi mrtvá sezóna 1975
10. Když písně lžou 1975
11. Melodram 1978
12. Zdá se 1977
13. Nevím 1978
14. Čas nezralých malin 1978
15. Honey 1978
16. Baron Prášil 1978
17. Závrať 1978
18. Na pátou ránvej 1978
19. Tam, kam sokoli létají 1978
20. Kapky 1978

=== 1999 Hana Zagorová - Oheň v Duši Mé / Střípky (CD) ===
Bonton Music, total time: 72:32, BON 493156-2, AAD stereo

1. Líto, je mi líto (Vendo tutto) 1980
2. Zásnuby 1980
3. Tam pod naší strání 1980
4. Srdce mé bláhové 1980
5. Bloudím mapou vzpomínek 1980
6. Povídej si se mnou, abych neplakala 1980
7. Víš, co je most 1980
8. Oheň 1980
9. Doktore, au 1980
10. Pane vrchní, platím 1980
11. Oheň v duši mé 1980
12. Usnul nám, spí 1981
13. Nevěřím ti 1981
14. Benjamin 1981
15. Oceán 1981
16. Opona 1981
17. Píseň lásky tlampač z dáli hrál 1981
18. Setkání 1979 (w/Drupi)
19. Lásko, amore 1979 (w/Juraj Kukura)
20. Dvě žlutá kuřátka (Piano Jack and Dixieland) 1978 (w/Helena Vondráčková)
21. Vyhrát se dá 1981 (w/Jiří Korn)
22. Dávné lásky 1980 (w/Karel Gott)

=== 1999 Michal David - Pár Přátel Stačí Mít (CD) ===
Sony BMG

1. Romeo a Giulietta

=== 2000 Hana Zagorová - Modrá Čajovna (CD) ===
Multisonic

1. Modrá čajovna
2. Dneska už to vím
3. Zpráva všem holubům
4. Chvíli jsem balónem
5. Stíny
6. Jízda
7. Pěšáci z front
8. Jaká jsem
9. Benjamin
10. Duhová víla
11. Zlato
12. Usnul nám, spí
13. Jako jindy
14. Pofoukej mi jahody
15. Počítadlo lásky
16. Ahoj, léto
17. Dáme autu trochu pít
18. Je tu doba dešťů
19. Když jsem vedle tebe

=== 2000 Hana Zagorová - Světlo a Stín (CD) ===
Bonton Music, total time: 75:24, BON 495384-2, AAD stereo

1. Láska je počasí 1982
2. Tak ty ses vrátil 1982
3. Biograf láska 1982
4. Jedu s vámi 1982
5. Jako zlatý déšť 1982
6. Narozeniny 1982
7. Stáří (Miss You Tonite) 1982
8. Příboj 1982
9. Anonym (My Old Pal) 1982
10. Počítadlo lásky 1982 (uncredited: Petr Kotvald, Stanislav Hložek)
11. Ještě chvíli 1982
12. Žízeň po životě 1982
13. Dáme autu trochu pít 1981
14. Múj zústaň 1982
15. Púl štěstí 1982
16. Apríl 1982 (w/Karel Gott)
17. Malování ve snu 1982
18. Počestní, nečestní 1982
19. Otvírání psaní 1982
20. Múj den zítřejší (Out Here on my Own) 1983
21. Bída 1983
22. Mám tě ráda, jsi přítel múj 1984 (w/Petr Kotvald, Stanislav Hložek, VOX, etc.)

=== 2000 Various Artists - Písničky pro Děti (CD) ===
Multisonic

1. Silly song (also known as Sněhurka a 7 trpaslíků)
2. Koncert

=== 2001 Hana Zagorová - Mimořádná Linka (CD) ===
Bonton Music, total time: 75:52, BON 499741-2, AAD stereo

1. Diskohrátky (The locomotion) 1981
2. Líto, je mi líto (Vendo tutto) 1980
3. Benjamin 1980
4. Já vím (Nie mehr...) 1982
5. Vím málo 1983
6. Proč nejsi větší (I am the Lady) 1982
7. Mimořádná linka (Praha - Tokio) (Japanese Boy) 1982
8. Ty nejsi zralý (Rosie) 1982 (w/Petr Kotvald, Stanislav Hložek)
9. Usnul nám, spí 1981
10. Kosmický sen 1979
11. Kočičí píseň (The Old Gumbie Cat) 1981 (w/Petr Kotvald, Stanislav Hložek)
12. Nápad (Everybody's Rockin') 1982
13. Černý páv (Hard to Say I'm Sorry) 1983 (w/Petr Kotvald, Stanislav Hložek)
14. Máj je máj (My oh My) 1983 (uncredited: Petr Kotvald, Stanislav Hložek)
15. Kam jdou (Hello) 1984
16. Jen pár dnů (Cosa sei) 1984 (w/Vlastimil Harapes)
17. Mys dobrých nadějí 1984
18. Džínovej kluk (Girls Just Want to Have Fun) 1984
19. Já o něm vím své (I Know Him so Well) 1985 (w/Petra Janů)
20. Jízda 1985
21. Kluk z příštího století (Almost Paradise) 1984 (w/Stanislav Hložek)

=== 2001 Hana Zagorová - Hanka (CD) ===
Multisonic

1. Dopis na rozloučenou
2. Zůstaň tady léto
3. To přece není náhodou
4. Je naprosto nezbytné
5. Když jsi se mnou
6. Ode zdi ke zdi
7. Blahovolně
8. Pokušení
9. Nebylo by, kdyby
10. Závist
11. Když vcházíš ránem
12. Za každou chvíli s tebou platím
13. Skleněný dům
14. Čas
15. Dopis na rozloučenou II

=== 2001 Helena Vondráčková - Paprsky / Múzy (2CD) ===
Bonton Music

1. Život je jen náhoda

=== 2001 Various Artists - Zlaté Duety (CD) ===
1. Ta pusa je tvá (w/Petr Rezek)
2. Duhová víla (w/Petr Rezek)
3. Apríl (w/Karel Gott)

=== 2001 Hana Zagorová - Co Stalo se, Stalo (CD) ===
Bonton Music, total time: 76:37, BON 504190-2, AAD stereo

1. Křižovatka 6 1984
2. Dneska už to vím 1984 (w/Petr Kotvald, Stanislav Hložek)
3. Co ti brání v pousmání 1984 (uncredited: Petr Kotvald, Stanislav Hložek)
4. Skála 1984 (w/Petr Kotvald, Stanislav Hložek)
5. Co stalo se, stalo 1984
6. Stvořená k lásce 1984 (w/Petr Kotvald, Stanislav Hložek)
7. Zvonková pouť 1984
8. Maják (To Love) 1984
9. Čas celou noc 1984
10. Ztracená 1984
11. Řekni třikrát lásko 1984
12. Už dlouho se mi zdáš 1984
13. Všichni jsme stejní 1984
14. Letní kluci 1985
15. Je tu doba dešťů 1986
16. Až budou kytky umět psát 1985
17. Má pohádková země 1985
18. Lásko kolem nás 1985
19. Kdo má rád (I Don't Want to Talk About It) 1985
20. Take me for the ride tonight (Počítadlo lásky) 1984
21. Cinema of love (Biograf láska) 1984

=== 2002 Helena Vondráčková - Sblížení (CD) ===
Bonton Music

1. Dvě žlutá kuřátka

=== 2003 Hana Zagorová - Navěky Zůstane Čas (CD) ===
Multisonic

1. Navěky zůstane pouze čas
2. Odvykám
3. Smůlu máš
4. Krev a šroubky
5. Lásko vítej
6. Jsi navždy zodpovědný
7. Chlap je noc a ženská den
8. Zlámané klíče
9. Už pár dnů
10. Co jsi zač?
11. Že je mi líto
12. Sfoukni půlměsíc

=== 2003 Hana Zagorová - Největší Hity (Best of) (2CD) ===
Bonton Music, total time: 78:39 (CD1), 77:24 (CD2), BON 511012-2, AAD stereo

==== CD1 ====
1. Svatej kluk 1968
2. Mrtvá láska 1968
3. Obraz smutný slečny 1968
4. Honey (Honey) 1969
5. Tisíc nových jmen 1969
6. Bludička Julie 1969
7. Tanečnice 1970
8. Gvendolína 1971
9. On je někdo (You're a Lady) 1973
10. Breviář lásky 1975
11. Cesta ke štěstí 1975
12. Dávám kabát na věšák 1975
13. Studánko stříbrná 1975
14. Maluj zase obrázky 1976
15. Málokdo ví (Sambario) 1977
16. Duhová víla 1977 (w/Petr Rezek)
17. Zdá se 1977
18. Ta pusa je tvá (Stumblin' in) 1979 (w/Petr Rezek)
19. Kdyby se vrátil čas 1979
20. Setkání 1979 (w/Drupi)
21. Líto, je mi líto (Vendo tutto) 1980
22. Oheň v duši mé 1980

==== CD2 ====
1. Lásko, amore 1981 (w/Juraj Kukura)
2. Usnul nám, spí 1981
3. Sloky trochu smutné lásky 1981
4. Nápad (Everybody's Rockin') 1981
5. Biograf láska 1982
6. Spěchám (Queen of Hearts) 1982 (w/Petr Kotvald, Stanislav Hložek)
7. To by nebylo fér (I'll Find my Way Home) 1983 (w/Petr Kotvald, Stanislav Hložek)
8. Hej, mistře basů (Mr. Bass Man) 1983 (w/Karel Vágner)
9. Vím málo (She's Always a Woman) 1983
10. Co stalo se, stalo 1984
11. Jinak to nejde (Guardian Angel) 1984 (w/Petr Kotvald, Stanislav Hložek)
12. Můj čas 1984 (w/Petr Kotvald, Stanislav Hložek)
13. Jen pár dnů (Cosa sei) 1984 (w/Vlastimil Harapes)
14. Mys dobrých nadějí 1984
15. Nešlap, nelámej 1985
16. Bourá se dům 1987 (w/Jan Neckář)
17. Rybičko zlatá, přeju si 1989
18. Merilyn 1991
19. Mží 1994 (w/Karel Gott)
20. Ave Maria 1994 (w/Štefan Margita)
21. Za každou chvíli s tebou platím 2000
22. Je naprosto nezbytné 2000

=== 2003 Hana Zagorová - Portréty Českých Hvězd (CD) ===
Areca

1. Ta pusa je tvá
2. Já se vznáším
3. Hany
4. Obraz smutný slečny
5. Kouzelný obraz
6. Já lásku znám
7. Písnička v bílém
8. Až nebudeš mě chtít
9. Dinda
10. Verbíř
11. Život je loto
12. Už nejsi můj milý
13. Prý jsem zhýralá
14. Flétnou tě přivolám
15. Můj zůstaň

=== 2003 Various Artists - Splněná Přání: Vánoční Album Hvězd (CD) ===
Supraphon

1. Vánoční tajemství (w/Petr Rezek)
2. Jen jedenkrát v roce

=== 2004 Hana Zagorová - Sítě Kroků Tvých (CD) ===
Supraphon, total time: 73:51, SU 5519-2 311, AAD stereo

1. Hej 1985
2. Poslední z posledních 1985
3. Nic jí neschází 1985 (w/Petr Kotvald, Stanislav Hložek)
4. Noční dopis 1985
5. Starosti 1985
6. Sláva, je bál (Niech žyje bal) 1985
7. Co mám ze své výhry 1985
8. Maxitaxi 1985
9. Nešlap, nelámej 1985
10. Zločin století 1985
11. Když svítím 1985
12. Ztracená píseň 1985
13. Sítě kroků tvých (Sulla tua pelle) 1985
14. To jsi ty 1980
15. Auťák na lásku 1983 (w/Petr Kotvald, Stanislav Hložek)
16. Pátek (Tuesday) 1981
17. Ty jsi jednoho dne přišel na můj práh 1980
18. Rýmy 1980
19. Já mám pár tónů 1976
20. Telegram (Telegram) 1977
21. Tak to jsem já (December 1963 - Oh What a Night) 1977
22. Kdyby se vrátil čas 1979

=== 2004 Various Artists - Nejkrásnější Dueta (CD) ===
Supraphon

1. Dávné lásky (w/Karel Gott)
2. Lásko, amore (w/Juraj Kukura)
3. Ta pusa je tvá (w/Petr Rezek)
4. Vyhrát se dá (w/Jiří Korn)

=== 2004 Helena Vondráčková - Přelety (DVD) ===
Supraphon

1. Dvě žlutá kuřátka (w/Helena Vondráčková)

=== 2004 Hana Zagorová - Já Lásku Znám (CD) ===
1. Ta pusa je tvá
2. Já se vznáším
3. Hany
4. Obraz smutný slečny
5. Kouzelný obraz
6. Já lásku znám
7. Písnička v bílém
8. Až nebudeš mě chtít
9. Dinda
10. Verbíř
11. Život je loto
12. Už nejsi můj milý
13. Prý jsem zhýralá
14. Flétnou tě přivolám
15. Můj zůstaň

=== 2004 Various Artists - Nejkrásnější Česká Dueta (CD) ===
1. Hej, mistře basů (Mr. Bass Man) 1983 (w/Karel Vágner)
2. Ta pusa je tvá (Stumblin' in) 1979 (w/Petr Rezek)
3. Duhová víla 1977 (w/Petr Rezek)

=== 2004 Helena Vondráčková - Rendez-Vous (CD) ===
Universal Music

1. Dvě žlutá kuřátka (w/Helena Vondráčková)

=== 2004 Hana Zagorová - Biograf Láska (CD) ===
1. Biograf láska
2. Zdá se
3. Maluj zase obrázky
4. Duhová víla (w/Petr Rezek)
5. Nešlap, nelámej
6. Já se vznáším
7. Usnul nám, spí
8. Mys dobrých nadějí
9. Je t'aime
10. Kapky
11. Když tě ztrácím
12. Studánko stříbrná
13. Zpráva všem holubům
14. Přítel splín
15. Cesta ke štěstí
16. Já chtěla jsem ti báseň psát
17. Dneska už to vím
18. Zásnuby
19. Sloky trochu smutné lásky

=== 2004 Karel Gott - Lásko Má (CD) ===
Supraphon

1. Dávné lásky (w/Karel Gott)

=== 2004 Various Artists - Hitparáda 70. let (2CD) ===
Supraphon

1. Ta pusa je tvá (w/Petr Rezek)
2. Bludička Julie
3. Maluj zase obrázky

=== 2004 Various Artists - Hitparáda 80. let (2CD) ===
Supraphon

1. Hej, mistře basů (w/Karel Vágner)
2. Můj čas (w/Petr Kotvald, Stanislav Hložek)

=== 2004 Various Artists - Zlaté Duety 2 (CD) ===
1. Dvě žlutá kuřátka (w/Helena Vondráčková)
2. Vánoční tajemství (w/Petr Rezek)

=== 2004 Petr Kotvald, Stanislav Hložek - Holky z Naší Školky po 20ti Letech (CD) ===
Monitor

1. Můj čas (Remix) (2004) (w/Petr Kotvald, Stanislav Hložek)

=== 2005 Hana Zagorová - Náhlá Loučení (CD) ===
Supraphon, total time: 72:48, SU 5618-2 3, AAD stereo

1. Náhlá loučení 1986
2. Jako nemluvně 1986
3. Já ti mávám 1986 (w/Karel Vágner)
4. Druhá láska 1986
5. Byl jsi tak jiný 1986
6. Sbohem, dobrá firmo 1986
7. Jízda 1986
8. Neříkej mi 1986
9. Láska na inzerát 1986
10. Touhy 1986
11. Tvá kočka 1986
12. Už se mi nechce jít dál 1986
13. Naše láska ztrácí L 1986
14. Kousek cesty s tebou 1986
15. Zas tu máme závěr léta (Non la puoi chiamare vita) 1987
16. Poutník jménem život (Trzeba mi wielkej wody) 1982
17. Proč ti na tom tak záleží (Mrs. Caroline Robinson) 1978
18. Sliby, chyby (Funny, Funny) 1972
19. Fata morgana 1972
20. Kluk, na kterého múžu dát (Byla to glupia milosc) 1974
21. Zima, zima, zima, zima 1975

=== 2005 Various Artists - Ještě že Tě, Lásko, Mám (CD) ===
Supraphon, SU 5612-2 3

1. Biograf láska

=== 2005 Various Artists - Made in Italy (CD) ===
Supraphon, SU 5641-2 3

1. Málokdo ví
2. Jen pár dnů
3. Polibek (w/Petr Kotvald, Stanislav Hložek)

=== 2005 Various Artists - Kytice (2CD) ===
Supraphon, SU 5672-2 312

1. Vodník
2. Bludička

=== 2006 Various Artists - Den, Kdy se Vrátí Láska (CD) ===
Supraphon, SU 5685-2 311

1. Setkání (w/Drupi)

=== 2006 Hana Zagorová - Živá Voda (CD) ===
Supraphon, total time: 73:58, SU 5687-2 311, AAD stereo

1. Srážka s láskou 1987
2. Větroplach 1987
3. Už si nevzpomínám 1987
4. S loudilem v patách 1987
5. Skleněné sny 1987
6. Chvíli jsem balónem 1987
7. Bourá se dům 1987 (w/Jan Neckář)
8. Drápkem se zachytím 1987
9. Smiřování 1987
10. Jako jindy 1987
11. Zemětřesení 1987
12. Velká krádež 1987
13. Živá voda 1987
14. Já se vznáším 1974
15. Múj sen je touha žít (Vado via) 1976
16. Byl to více než přítel múj 1976
17. Svážu stuhou déšť 1975
18. Asi, asi (Honey, Honey) 1975 (w/Petr Rezek)
19. Kamarád 1975
20. Přítel čas (All Grown Up) 1979
21. Sám jsi šel 1977
22. A v noci bude mráz 1976

=== 2006 Karel Gott - Dnes / Country Album (2CD) ===
Supraphon

1. Dávné lásky (w/Karel Gott)

=== 2006 Damichi - Největší Italské Hity 4 (CD) ===
Sony BMG

1. Setkání (2006) (w/Michal David, Damichi)

=== 2006 Hana Zagorová - Zlatá Kolekce: Hana Zagorová - S úctou... (4CD) ===
Supraphon, total time: 299:51, SU 5688-2 314, AAD stereo

==== CD1 ====
1. Bludička Julie 1969
2. Písnička v bílém 1968
3. Obraz smutný slečny 1968
4. Hany (Honey) 1969
5. Tisíc nových jmen 1969
6. Mrtvá láska 1969
7. Černý pasažér 1969
8. Prý jsem zhýralá (Chanson de Prevert) 1968
9. Tanečnice 1970
10. Budeš zase lhát 1970
11. Gvendolína 1971
12. Já jsem tvá neznámá 1971
13. Sliby, chyby (Funny Funny) 1972
14. Fata morgana 1973
15. Náš dům zní smíchem (I´ve Found My Freedom) 1973
16. Já znám ten balzám (Down By the River) 1974
17. Já se vznáším 1974
18. Breviář lásky 1975
19. Kamarád 1975
20. Dávám kabát na věšák 1975
21. Já mám pár tónů 1976
22. Zima, zima, zima, zima 1975

==== CD2 ====
1. Řeka zázraků 1976
2. Opona stoupá 1976
3. Maluj zase obrázky 1976
4. Cesta ke štěstí 1976
5. Vlaštovčí hnízdo 1976
6. Studánko stříbrná 1976
7. Málokdo ví (Sambario) 1977
8. Duhová víla 1977 (w/Petr Rezek)
9. Oheň a struny 1977
10. Nevím 1978
11. Máš svůj cíl (Good Bye, Joe) 1978
12. Pěšky jít, nám je souzený (Couple Of Swells) 1977 (w/Jiří Korn)
13. Zdá se 1978
14. Kapky 1978
15. Kdyby se vrátil čas 1979
16. Ta pusa je tvá (Stumblin´ In) 1979 (w/Petr Rezek)
17. Náskok (Hot Stuff) 1980
18. Setkání 1980 (w/Drupi)
19. Benjamin (Benžamin) 1980 (alternative version)
20. Povídej si se mnou, abych neplakala 1980

==== CD3 ====
1. Líto je mi líto (Vendo tutto) 1980
2. Usnul nám, spí 1980
3. Dávné lásky 1980 (w/Karel Gott)
4. Opona 1981
5. Nápad (Everybody's Rockin´) 1982
6. Sloky trochu smutné lásky 1982
7. Biograf láska 1982
8. Tak ty ses vrátil 1982
9. Žízeň po životě 1982
10. Spěchám (Queen Of Hearts) 1983 (w/Petr Kotvald, Stanislav Hložek)
11. To by nebylo fér (I'll Find My Way Home) 1983 (w/Petr Kotvald, Stanislav Hložek)
12. Vím málo (She's Always a Woman) 1983
13. Hej, mistře basů (Mister Bass-Man) 1983 (w/Karel Vágner)
14. Kam jdou (Hello) 1984
15. Černý páv (Hard To Say I'm Sorry) 1983 (w/Petr Kotvald, Stanislav Hložek)
16. Můj čas 1984 (w/Petr Kotvald, Stanislav Hložek)
17. Nešlap, nelámej 1985
18. Jen pár dnů (Cosa sei) 1984 (w/Vlastimil Harapes)
19. Mys dobrých nadějí 1984
20. Jinak to nejde (Guardian Angel) 1984 (w/Petr Kotvald, Stanislav Hložek)
21. Sítě kroků tvých (Sur ta peau /Sulla tua pelle/) 1985

==== CD4 ====
1. Sláva je bál (Niech žyje bal) 1985
2. Náhlá loučení 1986
3. Už se mi nechce jít dál 1986
4. Srážka s láskou 1988
5. Kousek cesty s tebou 1987
6. Živá voda 1987
7. Já nevím jak (I Don't Know Why) 1988 (w/Pavel Wožniak)
8. Zemětřesení 1988
9. Modrá čajovna 1989
10. Rybičko zlatá, přeju si 1989
11. Čas odejít 1990
12. Beránek (Zabavki pana Boga) 1990
13. Žena za tvými zády (Grande valse brillante) 1991
14. Přijď aspoň na chvíli 1993 (w/Boris Rösner)
15. Skanzen bídy 1990
16. Jako starý strom 1991
17. Mží 1991 (w/Karel Gott)
18. Rozhovor v tichu 1991
19. Merilyn 2000 (alternative version)
20. Ave Maria 1994 (w/Štefan Margita)

=== 2006 Karel Gott - Kontrasty / ...a to mám rád (2CD) ===
Supraphon

1. Apríl (w/Karel Gott)

=== 2006 Hana Zagorová - Perly Hany Zagorové (2CD) ===
Multisonic

==== CD1 ====
1. Studánko stříbrná
2. Je naprosto nezbytné
3. Rybičko zlatá, přeju si
4. Krev a šroubky
5. Biograf láska
6. Maluj zase obrázky
7. Zůstaň tady léto
8. Zásnuby
9. Modrá čajovna
10. Kdyby se vrátil čas
11. Co stalo se, stalo
12. Hej, mistře basů (Mr. Bass Man) (w/Karel Vágner)
13. Moře samoty
14. Duhová víla (w/Petr Rezek)
15. Hany (Honey)
16. Nešlap, nelámej
17. Usnul nám, spí
18. Jako starý strom
19. Kapky
20. Smůlu máš
21. Rozhovor v Tichu

==== CD2 ====
1. Nápad (Everybody's Rockin')
2. Mys dobrých nadějí
3. Navěky zůstane pouze čas
4. Zpráva všem holubům
5. Gvendolína
6. Sloky trochu smutné lásky
7. Já se vznáším
8. Dopis na rozloučenou
9. Zdá se
10. Cesta ke štěstí
11. Jízda
12. Žena za tvými zády
13. Stíny
14. Je tu doba dešťů
15. Nebylo by, kdyby
16. Tanečnice
17. Blahovolně
18. Blahovolně
19. Málokdo ví
20. Lásko vítej

=== 2006 Various Artists - Boublík (CD) ===
Radioservis

1. Jean
2. Kočičí slabikář
3. Motýlí žal
4. Dům svalové ztuhlosti (w/Viktor Sodoma, Jiří Štědroň)

== DVD ==
=== 2004 Hana Zagorová - Cesta ke Štěstí (2DVD) ===
Supraphon

==== DVD1 ====
- Úvod – Hana Zagorová 2004
1. Bludička Julie 1970
2. Svatej kluk 1969
3. Jsou v blátivý cestě koleje (Wedrowanie) 1969
4. Obraz smutný slečny 1970
5. Mrtvá láska 1970
6. Já jsem tvá neznámá 1972
7. Gvendolína 1972
8. Sliby-chyby (Funny, Funny) 1972
9. Náš dům zní smíchem (I've Found my Freedom) 1973
10. Kamarád 1975
11. Benjamin 1981
12. Studánko stříbrná 1976
13. Cesta ke štěstí 1977
14. Telegram (Telegram) 1978
15. Nevím 1981
16. Zdá se 1981
17. Směs písní s Petrem Rezkem 1989
  1. Ta pusa je tvá (Stumblin' in)
  2. Duhová víla
18. Honey (Honey) 1981
19. Dvě žlutá kuřátka (Piano Jack and Dixieland) 1978 (w/Helena Vondráčková)
20. Málokdo ví (Sambario) 1978
21. Setkání 1979 (w/Drupi)
22. Povídej si se mnou, abych neplakala 1981
23. Dávné lásky 1980 (w/Karel Gott)
24. Kapky 1981
25. Pěšky jít nám je souzený (Couple of Swells) 1977 (w/Jiří Korn)
26. Můj den zítřejší (Out Here on my Own) 1983
27. Láska je počasí 1983
28. To by nebylo fér (I'll Find my Way Home) 1983 (w/Petr Kotvald, Stanislav Hložek)
29. Biograf láska 1983
30. Narozeniny 1983
31. Tak ty ses vrátil 1983
32. Hej, mistře basů (Mr. Bass Man) 1983 (w/ Karel Vágner)
33. Rytmus 1982 (w/Petr Kotvald, Stanislav Hložek)
  1. Rýmy (Save me)
  2. Náš dům zní smíchem (I've Found my Freedom)
  3. Kosmický sen
  4. Já se vznáším
  5. Já jsem tvá neznámá
  6. Kamarád
  7. Duhová víla
  8. Nápad (Everybody's Rockin')
  9. Diskohrátky (The locomotion)
34. Maják (To Love) 1984
35. Kočičí píseň (The Old Gumbie Cat) 1983 (w/Petr Kotvald, Stanislav Hložek)
36. Co stalo se, stalo 1984
37. Maluj zase obrázky 1980
38. Jinak to nejde (Guardian Angel) 1984 (w/Petr Kotvald, Stanislav Hložek)
39. Pro dva tři úsměvy 1985 (w/Petr Kotvald, Stanislav Hložek)
40. Džínovej kluk (Girls Just Want to Have Fun) 1984
41. Kostky jsou vrženy (Monte Carlo is Great) 1983 (w/Petr Kotvald, Stanislav Hložek, VOX)
42. Vím málo (She's Always a Woman) 1983
43. Černý páv (Hard to Say I'm Sorry) 1983 (w/Petr Kotvald, Stanislav Hložek)
44. Spěchám (Queen of Hearts) 1983 (w/Petr Kotvald, Stanislav Hložek)
45. Kam jdou (Hello) 1984
46. Řekni třikrát lásko 1984
47. Vlaštovčí hnízdo 1984 (w/Karel Gott a Vlastimil Harapes)
48. Mys dobrých nadějí 1984
49. Náhlá loučení 1986
50. Už se mi nechce jít dál 1986

==== DVD2 ====
1. Letní kluci (No me puedes dejar asi) 1985
2. Sítě kroků tvých (Sulla tua pelle) 1985
3. Nešlap, nelámej 1985
4. Jen pár dnů (Cosa sei) 1985 (w/Vlastimil Harapes)
5. Sláva, je bál (Niech žyje bal) 1985
6. Já o něm vím své (I Know Him so Well) 1987 (w/Petra Janů)
7. Srážka s láskou 1988
8. Rybičko zlatá, přeju si 1989
9. Živá voda 1988
10. Čas odejít 1988
11. Žena za tvými zády (Grande valse brillante) 1991
12. Hra na pravdu 1993 (w/Dáša Veškrnová)
13. Přijď aspoň na chvíli 1993 (w/Boris Rösner)
14. Mží 1994 (w/Karel Gott)
15. Den jako obrázek 1998 (w/Helena Růžičková)
16. Ave Maria 1993 (w/Štefan Margita)
17. Směs vánočních koled 1993 (w/Štefan Margita)
  1. Půjdem spolu do Betléma
  2. Nesem vám noviny
  3. Já bych rád k Betlému
  4. Narodil sa Kristus Pán
18. Vánoční tajemství 2000 (w/Petr Rezek)
19. Za každou chvíli s tebou platím 2000
20. Beránek (Zabavki Pana Boga) 2000
21. Kdyby se vrátil čas 2001
22. Je naprosto nezbytné 2003
23. Nápad (Everybody's Rockin') 2004
- BONUS: Diskografie Hany Zagorové
- BONUS: Biografie

== Film and television ==
=== 1980: Trhák ===
Barrandov Studios, Comedy / Musical

- Director: Zdenek Podskalský
- Writers: Ladislav Smoljak, Zdenek Sverák
- International English title: "The Hit"
- Runtime: 94 min
- Country of origin: Czechoslovakia
- Language: Czech
- Color
- Cast: Hana Zagorová (Teacher Eliška), Josef Abrhám, Juraj Kukura, Waldemar Matuska, etc.
- Soundtrack includes: Žít je fajn, Znám křišťálovou studánku, Lásko, amore, etc.
- DVD released by Dividi in 2004

=== 1981-86: Dluhy Hany Zagorové ===
==== 1.díl: Dluhy Hany Zagorové 1981 ====
1. Láska v desátém semestru - Hana Zagorová
2. Opona - Hana Zagorová
3. Can I Reach You - Goldie Ens
4. Take Me - Goldie Ens
5. Kino Gloria - Petr Rezek
6. Žentour - instrumental
7. Tvůj parfém - Petr Rezek
8. Na Blysk - Eva Kuklinska
9. Diskohrátky - Hana Zagorová, Stanislav Hložek, I. Viktorin
10. Dávné lásky - Hana Zagorová, Karel Gott
11. Líto, je mi líto - Hana Zagorová
12. Rýmy - Hana Zagorová
13. Náskok - Hana Zagorová

==== 2.díl: Dluhy Hany Zagorové: Malý Poetický Recitál z Máchova Kraje 1982 ====
1. Perný den - instrumental
2. Oheň - Hana Zagorová
3. Povídej si se mnou, abych neplakala - Hana Zagorová
4. Unknown song - Buenaventura
5. První snídaně - Petr Rezek
6. Jaká jsem - instrumental
7. Oh, Suzi - Petr Kotvald, Stanislav Hložek
8. Kapky - Hana Zagorová
9. He's So Shy - Hana Zagorová, Buenaventura
10. Benjamin - Hana Zagorová
11. Píseň lásky tlampač z dáli hrál - Hana Zagorová
12. Perný den - instrumental

==== 3.díl: Dluhy Hany Zagorové: Konkurs 1982 ====
1. Počítadlo lásky - Hana Zagorová, Petr Kotvald, Stanislav Hložek
2. Skladby Hany Zagorové v podání účastnic konkurzu
3. Mimořádná linka - Hana Zagorová
4. skladba Příboj v podání vítěze konkurzu
5. Kočičí píseň - Hana Zagorová, Petr Kotvald, Stanislav Hložek
6. Vím málo - Hana Zagorová
7. Vím málo - instrumental

==== 4.díl: Dluhy Hany Zagorové: Světlo a Stín 1983 ====
1. Láska je počasí - Hana Zagorová
2. Anonym - Hana Zagorová
3. Tak ty ses vrátil - Hana Zagorová
4. Stáří - Hana Zagorová
5. Biograf láska - Hana Zagorová, Petr Kotvald, Stanislav Hložek
6. Hej, taste! - Hana Zagorová, Petr Kotvald, Stanislav Hložek
7. Valaki Gondol Rad - Rozo Soltezs
8. Narozeniny - Hana Zagorová, Petr Kotvald, Stanislav Hložek, etc.
9. Jako zlatý déšť - Hana Zagorová
10. Sluníčko na houpačce - recitace Hany Zagorové

==== 5.díl: Dluhy Hany Zagorové: Noc v Pasáži 1983 ====
1. Můj den zítřejší - Hana Zagorová
2. To by nebylo fér - Hana Zagorová, Petr Kotvald, Stanislav Hložek
3. Bílá královna - Petr Kotvald, Stanislav Hložek
4. Hej, mistře basů - Hana Zagorová, Karel Vágner
5. Szcesliwej drogi juz czas - VOX
6. Noční zkouška - J. Satoranský, S. Budínová, Z. Podskalský, O. Schoberová
7. Lovestory 2005 - Hana Zagorová, V. Preiss
8. Dvě žlutá kuřátka - Hana Zagorová, sbor

==== 6.díl: Dluhy Hany Zagorové: Pohádka z Karet 1984 ====
1. Řekni třikrát lásko - instrumental
2. Snad zítra slunce nám vyjde - Hana Zagorová, Petr Kotvald, Stanislav Hložek
3. Vzhůru mládenci - K.Gott, Jiří Korn, Vlastimil Harapes, Luboš Pospíšil
4. Když jsou pohádky v nás - Jiří Korn
5. Veřejný vítr - Luboš Pospíšil
6. Řekni třikrát lásko - Hana Zagorová
7. Vlaštovčí hnízdo - Hana Zagorová, Vlastimil Harapes, Karel Gott
8. To musím zvládnout sám - Karel Gott
9. Mys dobrých nadějí - Hana Zagorová
10. Vzhůru mládenci - Hana Zagorová, Petr Kotvald, Stanislav Hložek, Karel Gott, Jiří Korn, Vlastimil Harapes, Luboš Pospíšil

==== 7.díl: Dluhy Hany Zagorové: Na Chmelu 1984 ====
1. Ahoj, léto - Hana Zagorová, Petr Kotvald, Stanislav Hložek
2. Průšvih - Petr Kotvald, Stanislav Hložek
3. Dívka, co sama chodí spát - Petr Kotvald, Stanislav Hložek
4. Kam jdou - Hana Zagorová
5. Džínovej kluk - Hana Zagorová, Petr Kotvald, Stanislav Hložek
6. Už dlouho se mi zdáš - Hana Zagorová
7. Dneska už to vím - Hana Zagorová
8. Co stalo se stalo - Hana Zagorová
9. V průvanu - Hana Zagorová, Petr Kotvald, Stanislav Hložek
10. Milenci v texaskách, Kdyby sis oči vyplakala, Život je bílý dům, Den je krásný - Hana Zagorová, Petr Kotvald, Stanislav Hložek
11. Jinak to nejde - Hana Zagorová, Petr Kotvald, Stanislav Hložek

==== 8.díl: Dluhy Hany Zagorové: Hvězdná Pout 1985 ====
1. Zlato - Hana Zagorová
2. Letní kluci - Hana Zagorová
3. Pro dva tři úsměvy - Hana Zagorová, Petr Kotvald, Stanislav Hložek
4. Když svítím - Hana Zagorová
5. Dnes je prima den - sbor
6. Kontakt - Hana Zagorová, Petr Kotvald, Stanislav Hložek
7. Sítě kroků tvých - Hana Zagorová

=== 2005: Hrubeš a Mareš Jsou Kamarádi do Deště ===
CinemArt, Comedy / Drama

- Production Companies: Ateliers Zlín, První Verejnoprávní
- Country: Czech Republic
- Director: Vladimír Morávek
- Writers: Jan Budar, Vladimír Morávek
- Language: Czech
- Color
- Cast: Hana Zagorová (Herself), Jan Budar, Richard Krajco, Miroslav Donutil, etc.
- Sound Mix: Dolby Digital
- Ratings: Czech/15
- Filming Started: November 3, 2004
- Release Date: October 13, 2005
- Screen Count for Week #1: 26 Screens
- Box Office: 13 October 2005: CZK 1,268,699 (Czech Republic)
- Box Office: 20 October 2005: CZK 2,873,551 (Czech Republic)
- Box Office: 27 October 2005: CZK 4,170,929 (Czech Republic)
- Box Office: 3 November 2005: CZK 4,948,512 (Czech Republic)

== Collaborations ==
=== Petr Kotvald, Stanislav Hložek ===
- Ahoj, léto 1984
- Auťák na lásku 1983
- Buldok (Ping Pong) 1983
- Černý páv (Hard to Say I'm Sorry) 1983
- Dneska už to vím 1984
- Hej, taste (Mickey) 1983
- Hotel Avion 1984
- Jen jedenkrát v roce (Einmal im Winter) 1986
- Jinak to nejde (Guardian Angel) 1984
- Kočičí píseň (The Old Gumbie Cat) 1981
- Koncert 1983
- Kontakt 1987
- Kostky jsou vrženy (Monte Carlo is Great) 1983
- Love Car (Auťák na lásku) 1986
- Modrý ostrov snů 1983
- Můj čas 1984
- My time (Můj čas) 1986
- Nic jí neschází 1985
- Polibek (Piccolo amore) 1984
- Potulní kejklíři 1985
- Pro dva tři úsměvy 1985
- Queen of Hearts (Spěchám) 1985
- Silly Song
- Skála 1984
- Snad zítra slunce nám vyjde 1984
- Spěchám (Queen of Hearts) 1982
- Starci na chmelu 1986
  - Milenci v texaskách
  - Kdyby sis oči vyplakala
  - Život je bílý dům
  - Den je krásný
- Stvořená k lásce 1984
- To by nebylo fér (I'll Find my Way Home) 1983
- Tu, tu 1986
- Ty nejsi zralý (Rosie) 1982
- V průvanu 1984

=== Petr Kotvald, Stanislav Hložek (uncredited) ===
- Co ti brání v pousmání 1984
- Máj je máj 1984
- Počítadlo lásky 1982

=== Stanislav Hložek ===
- Kluk z příštího století (Almost Paradise) 1984
- Slušných lidí je víc 1987
- Tam, kde schází terminál 1986
- Udělej si prima den 1987
- Velikánský umění 1986

=== Petr Rezek ===
- Asi, asi (Honey, Honey) 1975
- Dotazník (Rock Bottom) 1978
- Duhová víla 1977
- Rainbow fairy (Duhová víla) 1979
- Ta pusa je tvá (Stumblin´ In) 1979
- Vánoční tajemství 1977
- Zákaz předjíždění 1981

=== Karel Gott ===
- Apríl 1983
- Co já vím 1985
- Dávné lásky 1980
- Mží 1994
