= Josef Illík =

Czech cinematographer

- Born: 10 September 1919; Prague, Czechoslovakia
- Died: 21 January 2006 (aged 86); Prague, Czech Republic
- Occupations: Cinematographer, photographer
- Years active: 1945–1981

Josef Illík (10 September 1919 – 21 January 2006) was a Czech cinematographer and photographer.

== Life ==
Josef Illík studied photography in high school. His teachers were Ladislav Sutnar, Jaromír Funke and Josef Ehm. After the World War II he was a successful photographer, but also started working at Barrandov Studios as an assistant cinematographer. From 1952 to 1957 he was a cinematographer for army documentaries in Czechoslovak Army Film. Since 1958 he worked on feature films as a cinematographer. He frequently worked with directors Karel Kachyňa, Václav Krška and Václav Vorlíček.

== Selected filmography ==
- Smugglers of Death (1959)
- Smugglers of Death (1959)
- The Slinger (1960)
- The Day the Tree Blooms (1961)
- Spanilá jízda (1963)
- The House in Karp Lane (1965)
- Coach to Vienna (1966)
- The Nun's Night (1967)
- Jarní vody (1968)
- Witchhammer (1970)
- The Ear (1970)
- Three Wishes for Cinderella (1973)

== Publications ==
- Josef Illík. Praha zasněná. Orbis, Prague 1959
- Josef Illík. Praha 1945 – 1958. Argo, Prague 2018
