= Jiřina Jirásková =

Czech actress (1931–2013)

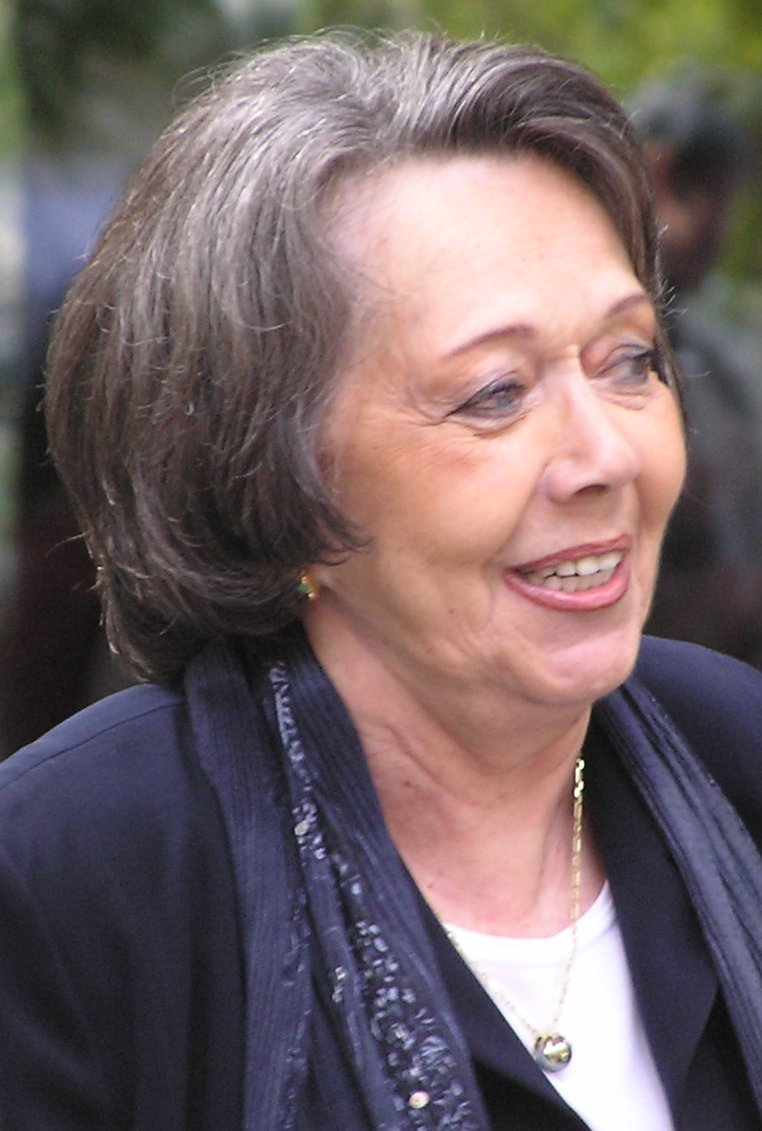
- Born: 17 February 1931; Prague, Czechoslovakia
- Died: 7 January 2013 (aged 81); Prague, Czech Republic
- Occupations: Actress; UNICEF Czech Committee President (2002–2011)

Jiřina Jirásková (17 February 1931 – 7 January 2013) was a Czech actress. She was born and died in Prague, Czech Republic.

== Biography ==
She studied at the Prague Conservatory and later at DAMU. After graduating, she spent one year in a regional theatre in Hradec Králové. In 1951, aged 20, she moved to the Prague's Vinohrady Theatre, where she spent her entire career. From 30 May 1990 to 30 June 2000, she was also the director of the theatre.

Jirásková began to appear in TV in the 1950s; she played in the first Czechoslovak TV series Rodina Bláhova (Bláha Family). She got her first on-screen opportunity in the spy drama Smyk, directed Zbyněk Brynych. She appeared in Every Penny Counts and Look Into His Eyes, and also worked with comedic director Zdeněk Podskalský.

In the 1970s, during the period of Czechoslovak "normalization", she was forced to leave acting. According to her own words, the ban was caused by her attitude during the reform period of the 1960s. She returned in 1983 for Karel Kachyňa's film Nurses. She appeared in more than 140 roles over 40 years.

She was the Goodwill Ambassador and President (2002–2011) of the UNICEF Czech Committee and, in 1999, tried unsuccessfully to run for the Senate representing the Civic Democratic Party.

== Personal life ==
She was married for two years to the actor Jiří Pleskot, and spent 27 years with Zdeněk Podskalský. She had no children.

=== Awards ===
- 1969 – Finále Plzeň Film Festival Audience Award for Most Popular Actress
- 1998 – Thalia Award
- 2006 – Medal of Merit

=== Death ===
Jiřina Jirásková died on 7 January 2013, aged 81.

== Notable theatre appearances ==
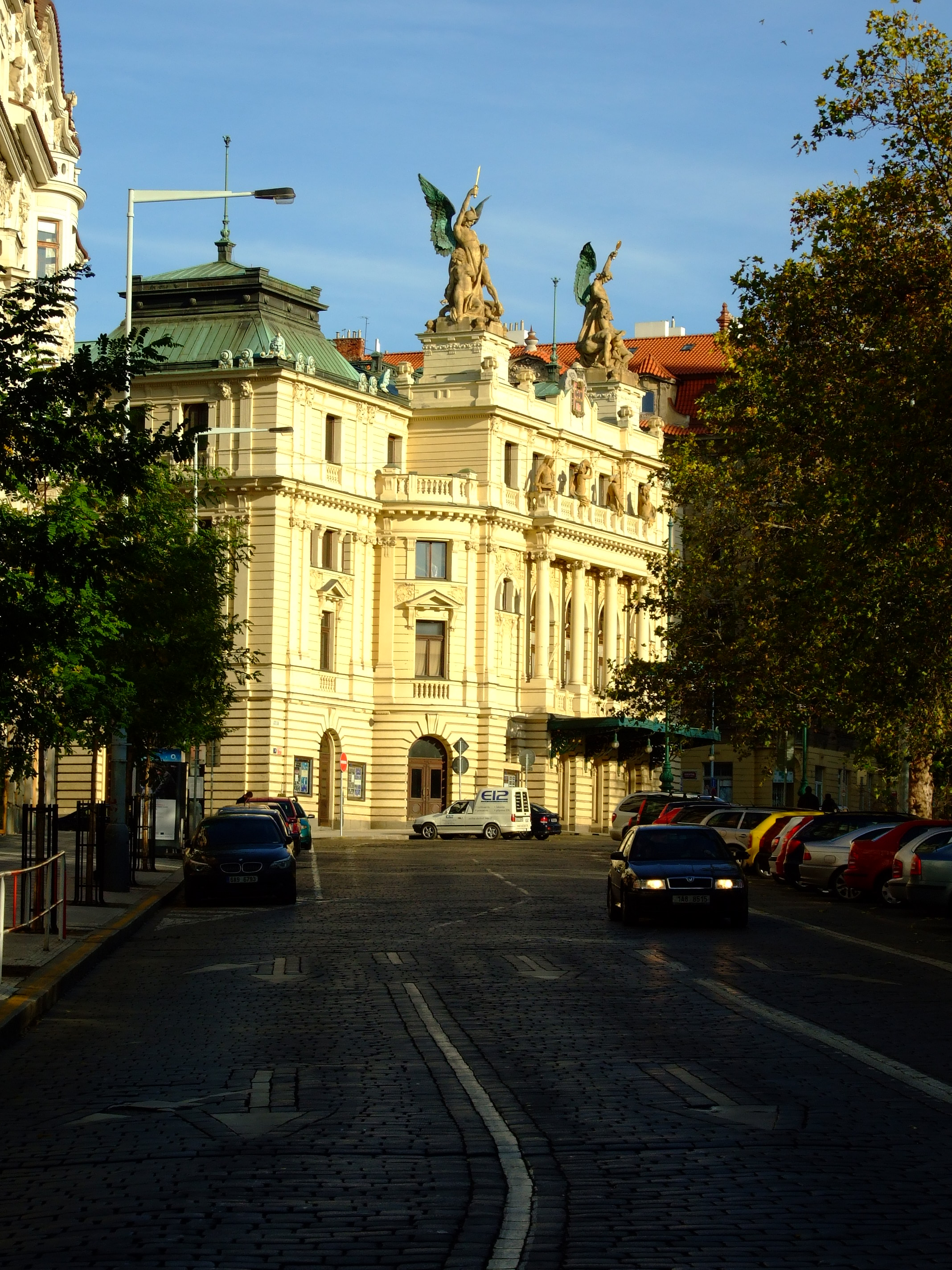
Jirásková spent major part of her career in Vinohrady Theatre, Prague.

- Caesar and Cleopatra (Cleopatra)
- The Government Inspector (Anna Andreyevna Skvoznik Dmuchanovská's governess)
- Richard III (Queen Margaret)
- The Diary of Anne Frank (Anne Frank)
- Much Ado About Nothing (Hero)
- Twelfth Night (Olivia)
- Ivanov (Anna Petrovna)
- Nora (Kristina Linde)
- The Full Monty (Jeanette)
- The Cherry Orchard (Charlotte)
- Henry IV (Marchioness Matilda Spina)

== Selected filmography ==
- 1965 – Ninety Degrees in the Shade as Věra
- 1967 – Hotel for Strangers as Marie
- 1969 – Světáci as Marcela
- 1969 – Já, truchlivý bůh as Mrs. Stenclová
- 1970 – Case for a Rookie Hangman as Tadeásová
- 1970 – On the Comet as Ester
- 1981 – The Hit as Script
- 1982 – Jak svět přichází o básníky as school director
- 1984 – Slunce, seno, jahody as Hubičková
- 1984 – Vinobraní as Albína Brousková
- 1984 – Jára Cimrman Lying, Sleeping as Mother
- 1985 – Sestřičky as Granny
- 1989 – Slunce, seno a pár facek as Hubičková
- 1991 – Slunce, seno, erotika as Hubičková
- 2005 – Angel of the Lord as Abbess Magdalena
- 2006 – Rafťáci as Dany's granny
