= Hana Zagorová =

Czech actress and singer (1946–2022)

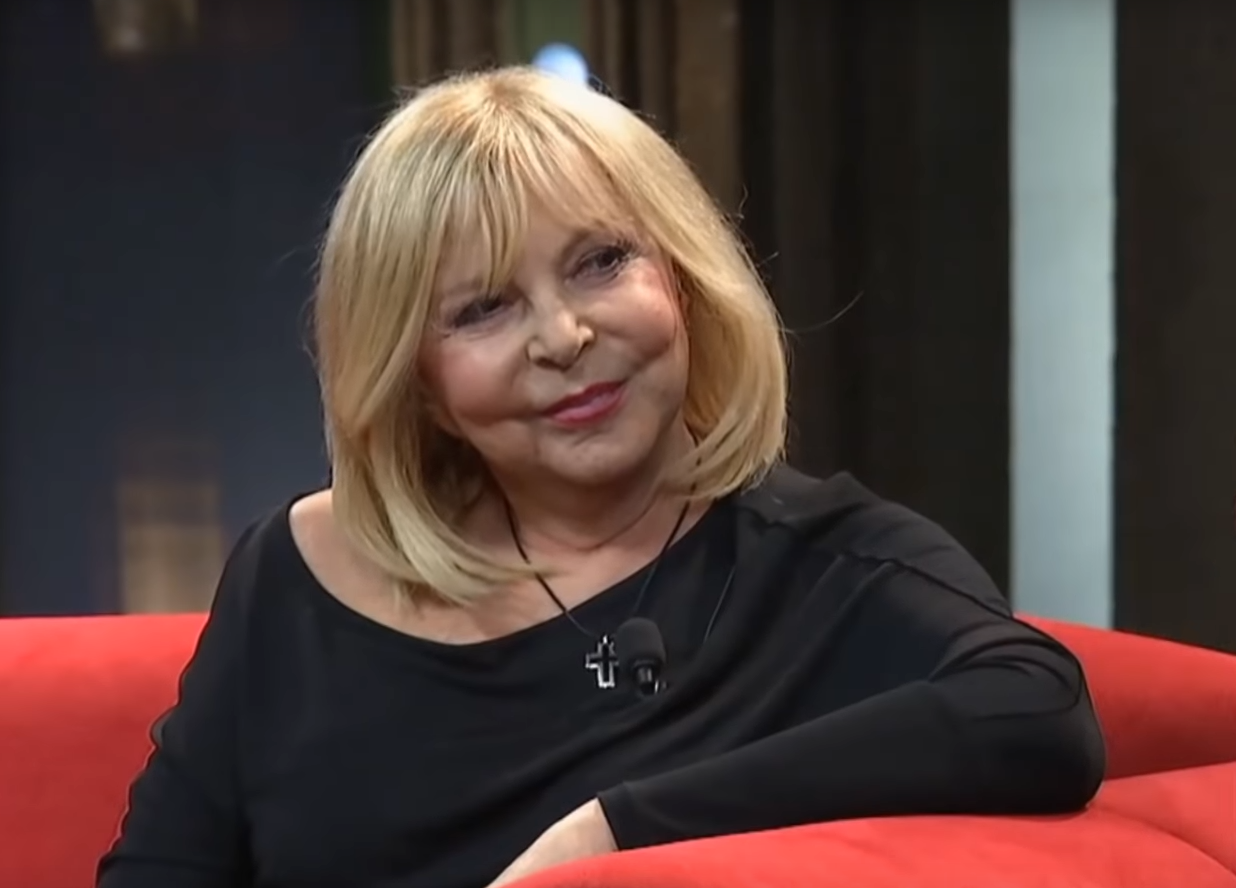
- Zagorová in 2014
- Born: 6 September 1946; Petřkovice, Czechoslovakia
- Died: 26 August 2022 (aged 75); Prague, Czech Republic
- Occupations: Singer; actress; presenter
- Years active: 1963–2022
- Musical career
- Genres: Pop music; chanson
- Instrument: Vocals
- Labels: Supraphon; Multisonic
- Website: zagorovahana.cz

Hana Zagorová (6 September 1946 – 26 August 2022) was a Czech singer, actress and presenter. She recorded music since 1964 and is considered to be one of the most famous Czech singers. She won the national Zlatý slavík music award on nine occasions between 1977 and 1985, the second highest number of victories in the award's history, after Lucie Bílá, who won the successor award, Český slavík, thirteen times.

== Career ==
=== 1960s ===
Zagorová first attracted attention in 1963 in the singing competition Hledáme nové talenty, where she was accompanied by the orchestra of Gustav Brom. In the years 1964–1968, she studied and subsequently graduated in acting at the Janáček Academy of Music and Performing Arts in Brno. In 1968, she released her first single, "Prý jsem zýraná". In the late 1960s, she began to appear on television and performed with the band Flamingo.

She also sang in the ensemble Sodoma-Gomorrah (Zagorová, Jiří Štědroň, Viktor Sodoma) and she began collaborating with the Václav Zahradník Orchestra, with which she recorded her first album Bludička (1970). The record contained one of her biggest hits, "Bludička Julie".

=== 1970s ===
After moving to Prague, Zagorová began recording with Taneční Orchestr Československého Rozhlasu. From 1972 to 1974, she was a guest at Semafor Theater, where, among other roles, she played the character of Bludička, the theme of her 1970 album. Her popularity with listeners grew, and in 1974 and 1975, she won Bronze in the Zlaty slavík music competition, followed by Silver in 1976, and from 1977, she won Gold nine times in a row.

In 1977, she famously signed the "Antichart", a petition opposing Charter 77.

Zagorová began appearing at concerts with her own backing band, and at the end of the decade, she performed several concerts across Czechoslovakia with Italian singer Drupi.

=== 1980s ===
During the 1980s, Zagorová regularly filmed her musical TV show, Dluhy Hany Zagorové. She performed at many concerts at home and abroad, sometimes up to 360 in a year. She was well known in Poland, Germany, and the USSR. She also collaborated with a number of foreign artists, including Polish singer Irena Jarocka.

In 1980, she appeared as one of the leads in the musical film The Hit by director Zdeněk Podskalský.

From 1980 to 1986, she performed with the dance and singing duo of Petr Kotvald and Stanislav Hložek, and in 1986, she began collaborating with musician and composer Karel Vágner. During this period, Zagorová recorded seven studio albums, with the input of numerous established as well as up-and-coming composers, including Petr Hapka.

In June 1989, Zagorová signed the "Několik vět" petition, in which Charter 77 demanded the release of political prisoners and freedom of speech. Her activities were blocked by the government and she was not allowed to speak in public until the fall of the Communist regime. She resisted pressure to repeal her signature, instead standing her ground with the words "There was nothing [in the petition] with which a decent person would disagree". She sang in public for the first time since the fall of the Communist regime in November 1989, together with Jaroslav Hutka, at Wenceslas Square in Prague.

=== 1990s ===
In 1991, Zagorová switched from record label Supraphon to Karel Vágner's Multisonic. She also travelled overseas, performing for her compatriots and fans in Canada.

After 1992, she began to limit her professional activity. According to her own words, she "felt that she had already sung what she was meant to sing". She devoted herself to her new husband, Štefan Margita, whom she had married that year. During this period, Zagorová wrote screenplays for several TV shows and released compilations of her older songs.

From 1993 until 1998, she had her own television show called Když nemůžu spát. She recorded new songs for this show, mostly duets with her guests. The songs were written by Michal David.

Zagorová began touring again in 1996, and renewed her collaboration with Petr Kotvald and Stanislav Hložek.

She also recorded two albums with her husband Margita, and in 1998, she released her first original album in four years, titled Já?

=== 2000s ===
Zagorová performed and toured extensively throughout the 2000s, mainly in the Czech Republic and Slovakia. She released three studio albums during this decade.

In 2006, she published a book of poetry titled Milostně.

In 2007, she performed on stage in Václav Patejdl's musical Jack the Ripper, and two years later, in Michal David's Mona Lisa.

In 2010, public broadcaster Czech Television and Supraphon published a biographical book with a DVD and CD entitled Legenda – Hana Zagorová – Málokdo ví. Zagorová organized a concert at Prague's Lucerna hall, during which Czech Television broadcast the recording.

=== 2010s ===
In 2014, Zagorová won Supraphon's Diamond Record for 10.5 million records sold and released the album Vyznání.

In September 2016, Zagorová celebrated her 70th birthday with a concert at a sold-out Lucerna, during which she announced her album O Lásce. It became the bestselling album the week it went on sale and was certified Gold. Two years later, Zagorová released Já nemám strach.

== Personal life ==
Hana Zagorová was born and raised in the Ostrava region. Her father, Josef Zagora, was a civil engineer, and her mother, Edeltruda, was a teacher. Zagorová's first husband was the dancer and ballet master Vlastimil Harapes, from 1986 until 1992. After they divorced, she married Slovak tenor Štefan Margita in 1992.

Zagorová suffered from paroxysmal nocturnal hemoglobinuria and in 2020, she experienced complications related to COVID-19. She died on 6 August 2022, aged 75. She is buried at Vyšehrad Cemetery.

== Discography ==
Studio albums

- Bludička (1971)
- Cesta ke štěstí (1976)
- Breviary of Love (1979)
- ...tobě, tebe, ti (1979)
- Oheň v duši mé (1980)
- Střípky (1981)
- Světlo a stín (1982)
- Mimořádná linka (1983)
- Co stalo se stalo (1984)
- Sítě kroků tvých (1985)
- Náhlá loučení (1986)
- Živá voda (1988)
- Dnes nejsem doma (1990)
- Rozhovor v tichu (1991)
- Když nemůžu spát (1994)
- Já? (1998)
- Hanka (2001)
- Navěky zůstane čas (2003)
- Zloděj duší (2007)
- Vyznání (2014)
- O lásce (2016)
- Já nemám strach (2018)

== Selected filmography ==
- The Hit (1981)
- Hrubeš a Mareš jsou kamarádi do deště (2005)

== Publications ==
- Milostně – poetry collection (2006)

== Bibliography ==
- Hana Zagorová and Michaela Zindelová. Hana Zagorová — dřív než to zapomenu Prague: Ikar, 2004 OCLC 62733951 (in Czech)
