= Long Live the Republic! =

- Directed by: Karel Kachyňa
- Written by: Karel Kachyňa; Jan Procházka
- Starring: Zdeněk Lstibůrek; Naděžda Gajerová; Vlado Müller
- Cinematography: Jaromír Šofr
- Edited by: Miroslav Hájek
- Music by: Jan Novák
- Production company: Filmové studio Barrandov
- Distributed by: Ústřední půjčovna filmů
- Release date: 5 November 1965
- Running time: 132 minutes
- Country: Czechoslovakia
- Language: Czech

Long Live the Republic! (Czech: Ať žije republika) is a 1965 Czechoslovak film directed by Karel Kachyňa and written by Jan Procházka. Set in a Moravian village in 1945, it follows a story of a 12-year-old boy named Piňda.

== Cast ==
- Zdeněk Lstibůrek as Oldřich Vařeka called Piňda
- Naděžda Gajerová as Oldřich's mother
- Vlado Müller as Oldřich's father
- Gustáv Valach as Cyril Vitlich
- Yuriy Nazarov as Soviet officer
- Iva Janžurová as Bertýna Petrželová
- Jindra Rathová as Vitlich's wife
- Jaroslava Vysloužilová as Veverka
- Eduard Bredun as Russian soldier Vasily
- Jiří Chmelař as Vašák

== Awards ==
- 1965 San Sebastián Film Festival Best film in International Competition
- 1965 San Sebastián Film Festival FIPRESCI Prize
