= Světáci =

1969 Czechoslovak comedy film

- Directed by: Zdeněk Podskalský
- Written by: Vratislav Blažek
- Starring: Jiří Sovák; Vlastimil Brodský; Jan Libíček; Jiřina Bohdalová; Jiřina Jirásková; Iva Janžurová
- Cinematography: František Valert
- Edited by: Zdeněk Stehlík
- Music by: Evžen Illín; Vlastimil Hála
- Production company: Barrandov
- Release date: 10 October 1969
- Running time: 103 minutes
- Country: Czechoslovakia
- Language: Czech

Světáci (lit. 'Worldlings') is a 1969 Czechoslovak situation comedy directed by Zdeněk Podskalský. The plot of the film is based on ordinary people pretending to be gentlemen and ladies of high society. It ranks among the most successful Czechoslovak comedies.

== Plot ==
Skopec, Prouza, Petrtýl are three rural facade workers who work in Prague renovating houses. They are attracted by the Prague nightlife, but their first visit to the luxurious Diplomat Grill is unsuccessful and they end up having to run away. So they have quality suits made and hire a former dance teacher, Dvorský, to teach them social conventions. When Dvorský admits that they are already educated, the men go to the Diplomat Grill again. Here they meet three young women. The men have no idea that they are easy girls who are looking for rich gentlemen so that they can rip them off for money.

An apartment is provided to them for a fee by the wardrobe lady Trčková from the Diplomat Grill, who tries to make them "ladies". At the appointed time, the wardrobe lady returns home and the girls always force the customers to flee up the scaffolding. The facade workers like the girls and after a cheerful party, they go to the wardrobe lady's apartment. This time, however, the trick does not work. While the party is in full swing, a previous robbed customer forces his way into the apartment, along with Public Security. The facade workers want to jump onto the scaffolding, but the house renovations have been completed that day and the scaffolding is no longer there, and they end up with broken limbs and other injuries. An ambulance takes them home to their wives.

== Background ==
The script was written in the politically relaxed year of 1968, and therefore may have included lines that were considered politically incorrect at the time. The screenwriter Vratislav Blažek came from the countryside and incorporated some of his own experiences into the film. The film was completed in 1969, before the start of strict censorship, but Blažek had to flee abroad before filming began. The film premiered on 10 October 1969.

The film was directed by Zdeněk Podskalský. It is a film that made him famous and often is considered his best film. Podskalský was aware that, due to the impending normalization in Czechoslovakia, this was the last film he could make freely without censorship interference, and he left the actors free to improvise.

== Reception ==
All three male and three female lead roles were cast by top actors of their time, which helped the film become a success. Between 1969 and 1989, the film was seen in cinemas by almost 3 million viewers, making it one of the most successful Czechoslovak comedies. After fifty years of its existence, the film is still regularly rerun on television and ranks among the cult Czech comedies.

== Cast ==
- Jiří Sovák as Antonín Skopec
- Vlastimil Brodský as Gustav Prouza
- Jan Libíček as Petrtýl
- Jiřina Bohdalová as Božka
- Jiřina Jirásková as Marcela
- Iva Janžurová as Zuzana
- Jiřina Šejbalová as Trčková
- Oldřich Nový as Dvorský
- Zdeněk Dítě as director of Diplomat Grill
- Ilja Prachař as Public Security captain
- Vladimír Menšík as Novák
- Otto Šimánek as man
- Jaroslav Moučka as Hovorka
- Josef Bek as elegant in a straw hat
- Helena Růžičková as visitor at the reception

== Theatrical adaptation ==
The Háta theatre company from Prague created a theatrical adaptation of the film. It premiered in 2011.
