= Muž, který stoupl v ceně =

Muž, který stoupl v ceně is a 1967 Czechoslovak film directed by Jan Moravec and Zdeněk Podskalský. The film starred Josef Kemr.
