= Kasaři =

1958 film directed by Pavel Blumenfeld

Kasaři is a 1958 Czechoslovak film. directed by Pavel Blumenfeld and written by Pavel Blumenfeld, Václav Kratochvil, and Zdenek Podskalský. The film starred Josef Kemr.
