= The Slinger =

- Directed by: Karel Kachyňa
- Written by: J. A. Novotný; Karel Kachyňa
- Starring: Michal Koblic; Vladimír Menšík; Vladimír Hlavatý
- Cinematography: Josef Illík
- Edited by: Jan Chaloupek
- Music by: Miloš Vacek
- Production company: Filmové studio Barrandov
- Distributed by: Ústřední půjčovna filmů
- Release date: 6 May 1960
- Running time: 83 minutes
- Country: Czechoslovakia
- Language: Czech

The Slinger (Czech: Práče) is a 1960 Czech World War II drama film directed by Karel Kachyňa based on a story by Jan Mareš.

== Plot ==
In 1944 Czech boy František, liberated from a concentration camp, is sent to a Czechoslovak unit located near Dukla Pass. Lieutenant Zlonický assigns him as an unsalaried employee to work in a laundry unit at the front.

== Cast ==
- Michal Koblic as Private pupil František Bureš
- Marie Magdolenová as Marijka Kalinčuková
- Vladimír Menšík as Military Cook Josef Pekárek
- Vladimír Hlavatý as Corporal Antonín Krupka
- Gustáv Valach as Private First Class Dalibor Šamonil
- Oldřich Musil as Private Evald Heller
- Martin Ťapák as Private Imrich Gallo
- Stanislav Remunda as Lieutenant Zlonický
- Miloslav Holub as Major Kubeš
