= The Nun's Night =

- Theatrical release poster
- Directed by: Karel Kachyňa
- Written by: Karel Kachyňa; Jan Procházka
- Starring: Jana Brejchová; Mnislav Hofmann; Gustáv Valach
- Cinematography: Josef Illík
- Edited by: Miroslav Hájek
- Music by: Jan Novák
- Production company: Filmové studio Barrandov
- Distributed by: Ústřední půjčovna filmů
- Release date: 15 February 1967
- Running time: 89 minutes
- Country: Czechoslovakia
- Language: Czech

The Nun's Night (Czech: Noc nevěsty) is a 1967 Czechoslovak film directed by Karel Kachyňa adapted from a novel by Jan Procházka. Set in a Moravian village in the early 1950s, a time of collectivisation as well as mass closures of monasteries and convents by the Stalinist regime, the film is an evocative critique of religious fanaticism and political ideology.

== Cast ==
- Jana Brejchová as Nun
- Mnislav Hofmann as Chairman Picin
- Gustáv Valach as Village idiot Ambrož
- Josef Kemr as Priest
- Josef Elsner as Farmer Jan Šabatka
- Čestmír Řanda as Farmer Alois Skovajs
- Jaroslav Moučka as Farmer Vitásek
- Josef Větrovec as Farmer Josef Bařina
- Valerie Kaplanová as Filipa, Picin's wife
- Libuše Havelková as Farmer Klára Jedličková
