= Spanilá jízda =

- Directed by: Oldřich Daněk
- Written by: Oldřich Daněk
- Produced by: Věra Kadlecová
- Starring: Petr Kostka
- Cinematography: Josef Illík
- Music by: Jan F. Fischer
- Production company: Barrandov Studios
- Distributed by: Ústřední půjčovna filmů
- Release date: 6 September 1963
- Running time: 97 minutes
- Country: Czechoslovakia
- Language: Czech

Spanilá jízda (Beautiful Ride or The Nuremberg Campaign) is a 1963 Czechoslovak historical film, directed by Oldřich Daněk. The film is set in 1427-1430.

== Cast ==
- Petr Kostka as Ondřej Keřský z Řimovi
- Jiří Vala as Eschweiler z Hohenbachu
- Michaela Lohniská as Katruše
- Jaroslav Průcha as Mikeš
- Martin Růžek as Prokop the Great
- Jiří Holý as Priest Jíra
- Karel Höger as Henry Beaufort
- Vlasta Fialová as Elisabeth of Hohenzollern
- Václav Špidla as Friedrich von Hohenzollern

== Plot ==
The film starts in 1427. Hussite army faces Crusaders at Tachov. Crusdaders are led by Henry Beaufort and hussites by Prokop the Great. One of crusaders loyal to Henry Beaufort is Eschweiler z Hohenbachu. Eschweiler murdered family of Ondřej Keřský and kidnapped his bride Anka. Ondřej joins hussite army so he can get revenge on Eschweiler but is caught when he tries to steal a horse and is whipped. When both armies face each other Crusaders run away from hussites. Three years later Ondřej is an experienced soldier. He sees opportunity to get revenge and joins campaign to Bavaria. City by city surrenders to hussites. Ondřej tries to find Eschweieler but nobody knows him. Hussites are getting closer to Nuremberg. Friedrich von Hohenzollern tries to negotiate with hussites. He promises to let 15 hussites enter Nuremberg. Ondřej is one of them. He finally finds Eschweiler. He finds out that Eschweiler raped Anka and she died when she gave birth to a son. He shows Ondřej her grave where he attacks him but Ondřej kills him. Hussite army is surrounded by army that Friedrich von Hohenzollern sent against them. Hussites never reached Nuremberg.
