= Štefan Margita =

Slovak opera singer (born 1956)

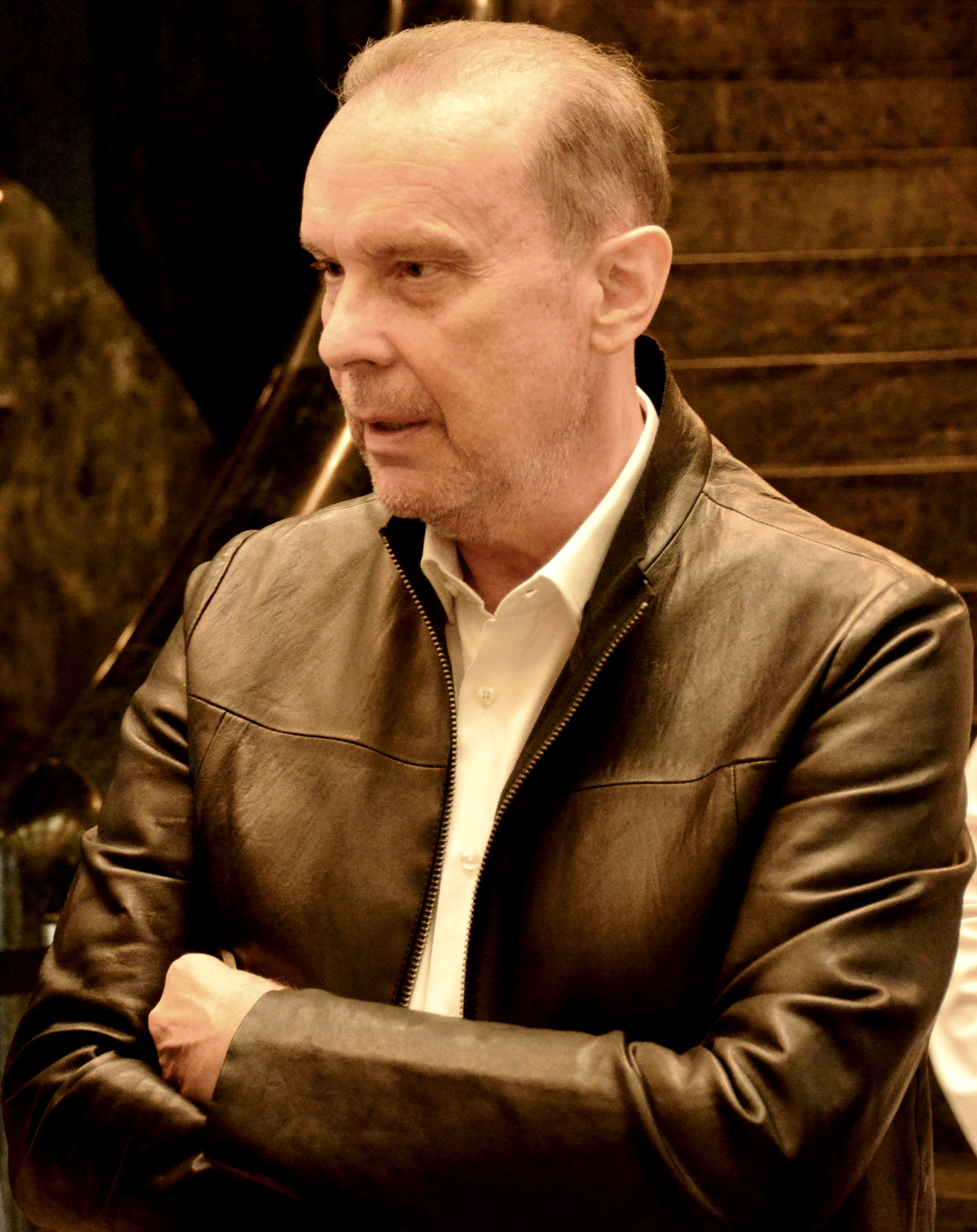
- Štefan Margita (2017)
- Born: 3 August 1956 (age 70); Košice, Czechoslovakia
- Occupation: Singer
- Years active: 1983–present
- Partner: Hana Zagorová (m. 1992; died 2022)

Štefan Margita (born 3 August 1956) is a opera singer of Slovak origin who has had an active international career since 1981. He began his career singing mostly roles from the lyric tenor repertoire but in recent years he has tackled a number of dramatic tenor roles. His career has taken him to the stages of many of the world's best opera houses, including La Scala, the Royal Opera, London, the Deutsche Oper Berlin, the Liceu, and the Opéra Bastille. Margita has had his debut performance at the Metropolitan Opera in November 2009 as Luka Kuzmič in Leoš Janáček's From the House of the Dead.

== Early life and career ==
Born in Košice, Margita first was a student at the industrial art school in his home city where he studied to be a photographer. He then entered the Košice Conservatory where he was a pupil of Lydia Šomorjaiová. In 1981 he became a member of the theatre in Prešov and then he worked at the opera house in Košice from 1983 through 1986.

In 1984 Margita won a singing competition in Teplice and in the spring of 1986 he won the international singing competition in Prague. The latter prize gained him an invitation to join the roster of principal singers at the Prague National Theatre beginning in August 1986. He stayed at the house through 1991, working simultaneously as a soloist at the Vienna Volksoper from 1987 to 1991. In 1992 he married Czech singer and actress Hana Zagorová. That same year he joined the Prague State Opera where he remained for two seasons.

== Awards ==
- 2017 Medal of Merit
- 2026 Thalia Award Opera
