= The Nurses (film) =

1984 film by Karel Kachyňa

- Directed by: Karel Kachyňa
- Screenplay by: Vladimír Bor; Karel Kachyňa
- Based on: Vizita by Adolf Branald
- Starring: Jiřina Jirásková; Alena Mihulová; Ondřej Vetchý
- Cinematography: Jan Čuřík
- Edited by: Jiří Brožek
- Music by: Luboš Fišer
- Production company: Filmové studio Barrandov
- Distributed by: Ústřední půjčovna filmů
- Release date: March 1, 1984
- Running time: 85 minutes
- Country: Czechoslovakia
- Language: Czech

The Nurses (Czech: Sestřičky) is a 1984 Czech comedy film directed by Karel Kachyňa based on the novel by Adolf Branald.

== Cast ==
- Alena Mihulová as Nurse Marie Sahulová
- Jiřina Jirásková as Old Nurse
- Ondřej Vetchý as Horsekeeper Petr
- Oldřich Vízner as Ambulance driver Arnošt
- František Husák as Physician
- Jiří Růžička as Gamekeeper Krákora
