= Smugglers of Death =

- Directed by: Karel Kachyňa
- Screenplay by: František A. Dvořák; Karel Kachyňa; Rudolf Kalčík
- Starring: Radovan Lukavský
- Cinematography: Josef Illík
- Edited by: Jan Chaloupek
- Music by: Miloš Vacek
- Production company: Filmové studio Barrandov
- Distributed by: Ústřední půjčovna filmů
- Release date: 25 December 1959
- Running time: 93 minutes
- Country: Czechoslovakia
- Language: Czech

Smugglers of Death (Czech: Král Šumavy) is a 1959 Czechoslovak drama directed by Karel Kachyňa. The film is about members of SNB who guard Czechoslovak border in 1948. The film was viewed by more than 4 million people after its release in 1959.

== Plot ==
The film is set in Šumava mountains, Czechoslovakia in 1948. People there illegally cross the border through the swampy area aided by a mysterious smuggler. Local SNB is aided in investigation by a young Sergeant Karel Zeman. He falls in love with a local shopkeeper Marie Rysová, whose husband escaped to the West. They become lovers but her husband unexpectedly shows up one day. He forces her to escape with him across the border and kills an SNB officer. They are led by a mysterious smuggler while Zeman chases them. Marie tries to run away but drowns in a swamp. Her husband is killed by the smuggler. Zeman then investigates and manages to track down the smuggler.

== Cast ==
- Radovan Lukavský as Lt. Václav Kot
- Jiří Vala as Sgt. Karel Zeman
- Jaroslav Marvan as Border control officer Beran
- Jiřina Švorcová as Marie Rysová
- Stanislav Remunda as Pavel Rys
- Miroslav Holub as Gamekeeper Paleček
- Jiří Holý as Galapetr
- Rudolf Jelínek as Sgt. Cigánek
- Vladimír Menšík as Sgt. Baryška
- Ilja Prachař as SNB Commander
