= The Hit (1981 film) =

1981 Czech film

Trhák (The Hit)
- Directed by: Zdeněk Podskalský
- Written by: Ladislav Smoljak; Zdeněk Svěrák
- Starring: Josef Abrhám; Juraj Kukura; Waldemar Matuška; Hana Zagorová
- Cinematography: Ivan Šlapeta
- Edited by: Petr Sitár
- Music by: Vítězslav Hádl; Petr Skoumal; Jaroslav Uhlíř; Karel Vágner
- Production company: Filmové studio Barrandov
- Distributed by: Ústřední půjčovna filmů
- Release date: 1 April 1981
- Running time: 94 minutes
- Country: Czechoslovakia
- Language: Czech

The Hit (also translated as Blockbuster, Czech: Trhák) is a Czechoslovak comedy musical film directed by Zdeněk Podskalský. It was filmed in 1980 and released on 1 April 1981. It featured several popular contemporary Czech performers, including singers Waldemar Matuška, Jiří Korn, Hana Zagorová, and Jiří Schelinger, in his last film appearance shortly before his tragic death.

== Plot summary ==
Ambitious director Kohoutek takes on a film script set in a contemporary village and intends to turn it into a spectacular star-studded musical. He promotes his vision against the opinion of the screenwriter Jíša, who had in mind a simple story from life, and despite the resistance of the production manager Šus, who considers the whole project an overpriced nonsense.

The story is about a young pyrotechnician Ticháček, who comes to the village to apply a new method of fast transport of manure to the cooperative fields, using explosives. He is enthusiastically and magnificently welcomed by all the citizens except Merunka, a crooked mason who built the local houses with adulterated mortar and rightly fears that they will fall due to the explosions. Ticháček gets attracted to the beautiful village teacher Eliška, for whose favor he fights with the mysterious Pavel Lenský from the local mansion. Eliška is eventually disappointed by Lenský's cowardice in the "haunted forest" and marries Ticháček, who shows courage every day when working with explosives.

Kohoutek tells this story through exalted singing performances and demanding choreographic numbers, to the dismay of both the submissive screenwriter and the hot-tempered production manager. The filming process is accompanied by various usual complications, but the real disaster strikes when the director accidentally lets the village sets detonate prematurely, and the entire expensive scene has to be erected and shot again. This leaves almost no money for the rest of the filming, so the staff have to improvise in extraordinary ways. The planned spectacular scene of the haunted forest ends up being shot in an ordinary forest, and instead of expensive tricks, a few scenes stolen from other fairy-tale movies (including real footage from Disney's Snow White) are pasted into the film.

Despite all the difficulties, the film is completed and premiered in the summer cinema, where it meets with great success. Although a storm comes towards the end of the screening that rips the screen apart, it happens in such a way that the audience sees it as a brilliantly executed directorial intention, and is amazed. Tearing the canvas is also a pun on the original title of the film (to rip, to tear ("trhat") and blockbuster ("trhák") have the same word root in Czech).

== Cast ==
- Hana Zagorová as herself playing Teacher Eliška
- Josef Abrhám as himself playing Ticháček
- Juraj Kukura playing Lenský
- Waldemar Matuška playing Ranger Kalina
- Laďka Kozderková playing Postwoman Zuzka, Ticháček's sister
- Petr Spálený playing Rambousek, chief of the cooperative farm
- Ladislav Smoljak as Kohoutek, the director
- Zdeněk Svěrák as Jíša, the screenwriter
- Petr Čepek as Šus, the production manager
- Jiřina Jirásková as the script manager

Václav Lohniský, who was cast as the bad mason Merunka, died shortly after the filming began and only managed to complete one scene. In the others, he is therefore represented by a double, taken from a distance or from behind.

The cast of the Kohoutek's film mostly appear under their real names outside the shot (as Mr Kukura, Ms Zagorová etc.), which gives the impression that we are watching the actual shooting of a film starring them.
