= Karel Kachyňa =

Czech film director

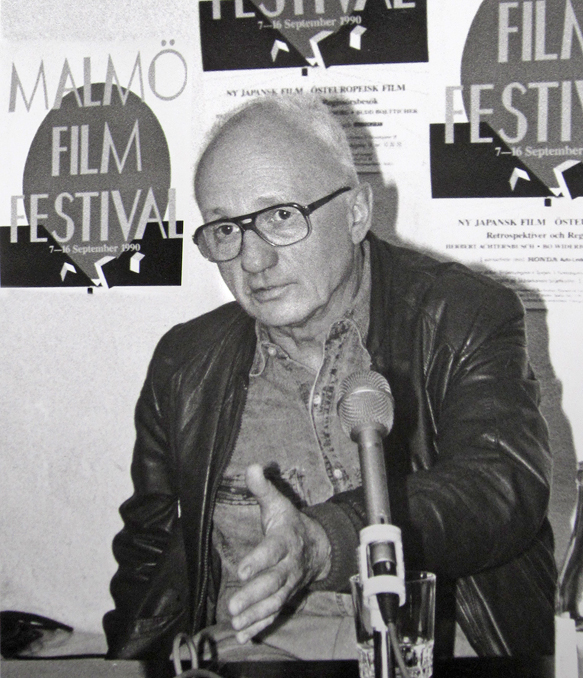
- Karel Kachyňa during a visit of the Malmö Film Festival, 1990
- Born: 1 May 1924; Vyškov, Czechoslovakia
- Died: 12 March 2004 (aged 79); Prague, Czech Republic
- Education: Film and TV School of the Academy of Performing Arts in Prague
- Occupations: Film director, Screenwriter
- Years active: 1950–2003
- Spouses: Eliška Kuchařová (m. 1950; div. 1964) Alena Mihulová (m. 1993)

Karel Kachyňa (1 May 1924 – 12 March 2004) was a Czech film director and screenwriter. His career spanned over five decades.

== Early life ==
He was born on May 1, 1924, in Vyškov, Czechoslovakia. His father was a government officer. His mother was an art teacher. After spending first 4 years of his life in Vyškov, he moved with his family to Dačice and then Kroměříž. Kachyňa studied at Baťa School of Art in Zlín. During the WWII he was forced to work in a German factory Walter Georgi in Bernsbach. After the war he was able to finish high school and work on commercials at the Baťa film studios in Zlín. Kachyňa was then accepted at newly founded Film and TV School of the Academy of Performing Arts in Prague (FAMU) to study cinematography and directing. His fellow students were Vojtěch Jasný, Zdeněk Podskalský and Antonín Kachlík.

== Career ==
After the graduation he directed socialist realist propaganda documentaries with Jasný. Throughout the 1950s they both worked for the Czechoslovak Army Film. In the 1952 they traveled to China with Art Ensemble of the Czechoslovak People's Army and made three documentaries about the country.

Kachyňa made his most celebrated movies with a screenwriter Jan Procházka in relatively free period in the 1960s.

After the Warsaw Pact invasion of Czechoslovakia and in subsequent Normalization period, his politically critical movies Long Live the Republic!, Coach to Vienna, The Nun's Night and The Ear were banned. Kachyňa was fired from his teaching job at FAMU, after the film Uninvited Guest by his student Vlastimil Venclík was interpreted as being a criticism of the Soviet Invasion. From the 1970s he directed mostly historical movies focused on the lives of regular people, and children movies. After the Velvet Revolution he was re-hired at FAMU and continued to teach there until his retirement.

== Personal life ==
Kachyňa was married twice. He had one daughter, Eliška, with his first wife Eliška Kuchařová. He met his second wife Alena Mihulová during the filming of Sestřičky in 1983. Their daughter, Karolína, was born in 1994. He lived in the 16th century house in Nový svět neighbourhood near Czernin Palace at Hradčany, Prague.

== Filmography ==
=== Feature films ===
Year	Name	Notes
1954	Everything Ends Tonight	
1955	The Lost Track	
1958	At That Time, at Christmas...	
1959	Smugglers of Death	
1960	The Slinger	
1961	Fetters	Entered in 2nd Moscow International Film Festival.
1961	Trials and Tribulations	Special Jury Prize at 1962 Mar del Plata Film Festival
1962	Vertigo	
1963	Hope	Best director at 1964 Mar del Plata Film Festival
1964	The High Wall	Silver Sail at 1964 Locarno Film Festival
1965	Long Live the Republic!	Best film at 1966 Mar del Plata Film Festival; FIPRESCI prize at 1966 San Sebastián Film Festival
1966	Coach to Vienna	3rd prize at 1966 Karlovy Vary Film Festival
1967	The Nun's Night	Official selection of 28th Venice International Film Festival
1968	Christmas with Elizabeth	
1968	Our Crazy Family	Kachyňa finished the film after its director Jan Valášek died
1969	A Ridiculous Gentleman	
1970	Jumping over Puddles Again	Silver Shell at 1971 San Sebastián International Film Festival
1970	The Ear	Released in 1990. Official selection of 1990 Cannes Film Festival
1971	The Secret of the Great Story-Teller	
1972	The Train to the Heaven Station	
1973	Love	
1973	Hot Winter	
1974	Pauline	
1974	The Girl Robinson	
1975	The Ugly Village	
1976	The Little Mermaid	
1976	Death of a Fly	
1978	Waiting for the Rain	
1978	Meeting in July	
1980	Love Between the Raindrops	
1980	The Little Sugar House	
1981	Watch Out, the Doctor Is on His Round!	
1983	Fandy, oh Fandy!	
1983	The Nurses	
1985	A Good Light	
1986	Forbidden Dreams	Entered into the 15th Moscow International Film Festival.
1987	...And What Now, Gentlemen?	
1988	To the Knowledge of Your Beloved	
1989	Young Girls, Crazy Guys	
1990	The Last Butterfly	Vienna Film Award at 1990 Vienna International Film Festival
1992	The Cow	
1995	Fany	
1999	Hanele	

=== Television ===
- Cesta byla suchá, místy mokrá (2003)
- Kožené slunce (2002)
- Otec neznámý aneb cesta do hlubin duše výstrojního náčelníka (2001)
- Three Kings (1998) TV series
- Prima sezóna (1994) TV series
- Městem chodí Mikuláš (1992)
- Vlak dětství a naděje (1989) TV series
- Duhová kulička (1985)
- Velký případ malého detektiva a policejního psa Kykyna (1982)
- Počítání oveček (1981)
- Zlatí úhoři (1979)

=== Documentaries ===
- Bratři (1975)
- Legenda (1973)
- Four Times About Bulgaria (1958)
- The City Has Its Own Face (1958)
- World Championship of Air Models (1957)
- Crooked Mirror (1956)
- Stará čínská opera (1953)
- Z čínského zápisníku (1953)
- Lidé jednoho srdce (1953)
- Neobyčejná léta (1952)
- They Know What to Do (1950)
- Za život radostný (1950)
- Není stále zamračeno (1949)

== Bibliography ==
- Melounek, Pavel (1984). Karel Kachyňa. Prague: Československý filmový ústav.
- Kachyňa, Karel; Jasný, Vojtěch; Čech, Jaroslav (1954). Byli jsme v zemi květů. Prague: Naše vojsko.
- Mihulová, Alena (2015). Můj život s Karlem Kachyňou : (i bez něj) (1st ed.). Prague: XYZ. ISBN 9788075050809.
