= Zdeněk Podskalský =

Czech film director (1923–1993)

- Born: 18 February 1923; Prague, Czechoslovakia
- Died: 29 October 1993 (aged 70); Prague, Czech Republic
- Resting place: Malenice
- Occupations: Film director, screenwriter
- Years active: 1950–1987

Zdeněk Podskalský (18 February 1923 – 29 October 1993) was a Czech film director and screenwriter. He is one of the most successful Czech directors of comedies and musical films.

== Life ==
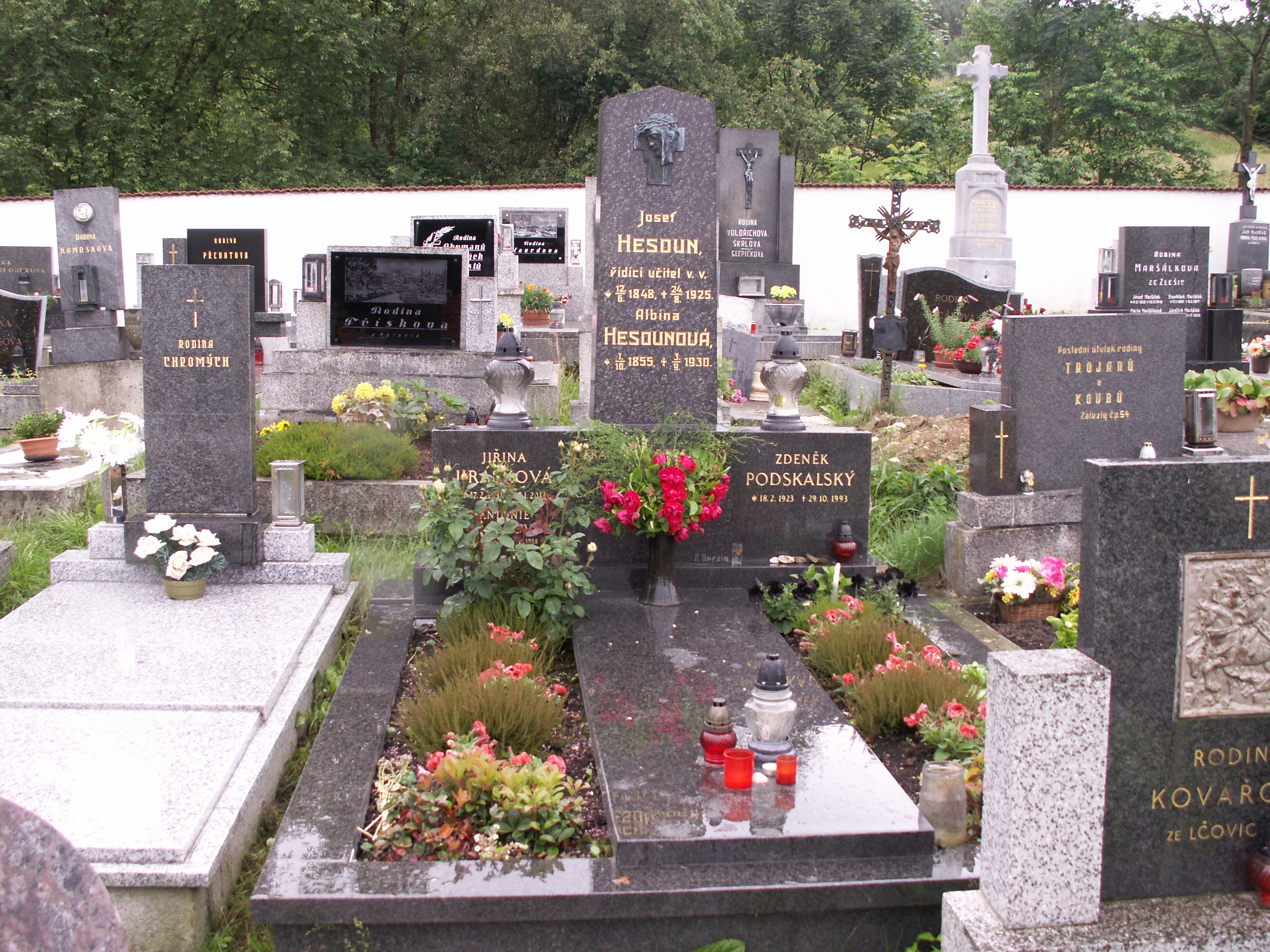
Grave of Zdeněk Podskalský and Jiřina Jirásková in Malenice

Zdeněk Podskalský was born on 18 February 1923. He was born in the U Apolináře Hospital in Prague, but he is a native of Malenice, where his family had a villa, and this village is therefore often referred to as his birthplace. He graduated from the high school in 1942 and already at that time had a thick beard, typical of his appearance.

In 1945–1949, he studied psychology, sociology and aesthetics at the Faculty of Arts of the Charles University. At the same time, in 1947–1950, he studied film directing at Film and TV School of the Academy of Performing Arts in Prague and then in 1951–1954 at Gerasimov Institute of Cinematography in Moscow.

Podskalský met his wife Tamara in Moscow and returned with her to Czechoslovakia, where they had a son, Zdeněk Jr. (born 1957, known as a documentary film director). His life partner then became the actress Jiřina Jirásková, but Podskalský did not divorce his wife so that she would not have to return to the Soviet Union. Podskalský lived in an apartment in the Malá Strana Bridge Tower in Prague, and although he and Jirásková were partners until his death, they lived separately.

He died on 29 October 1993, at the age of 70, from oncological causes. He was buried in Malenice.

== Career ==
As a film director, Podskalský specialized in comedies and musical films. Many of his films belong to the most successful Czech comedies. His film Světáci (1969) became a hit that made him famous. He is also credited as a screenwriter for some of his films. In addition to films, Podskalský directed more than 200 entertainment and music programs, including collaboration on New Year's Eve specials, and he appeared in the entertainment programs several times as a performer. He worked for Barrandov Studios until 1991.

== Selected filmography ==
=== Film director ===
- When the Woman Butts In (Kam čert nemůže, 1959)
- Bílá paní (1965)
- Muž, který stoupl v ceně (1967)
- Světáci (1969)
- Drahé tety a já (1974)
- A Night at Karlstein (Noc na Karlštejně, 1974)
- Ball Lightning (Kulový blesk, 1979; together with Ladislav Smoljak)
- The Hit (Trhák, 1981)

=== Screenwriter ===
- Kasaři (together with Pavel Blumenfeld and Václav Kratochvíl; 1958)
- The Treasure of a Byzantine Merchant (together with Ivo Novák and Václav Erben; 1966)
- A Night at Karlstein (Noc na Karlštejně, 1974)
