= List of Czech films of the 1980s =

A List of Czech films of the 1980s.

| Title | Director | Cast | Genre | Notes |
|---|---|---|---|---|
1980
| Cutting It Short | Jiří Menzel | Jiří Schmitzer, Magda Vašáryová, Jaromír Hanzlík, Rudolf Hrušínský, Rudolf Hrušínský jr. | comedy | from a novel by Bohumil Hrabal |
| Krakonoš a lyžníci | Věra Plívová-Šimková | Karel Heřmánek | Comedy | |
| Prázdniny pro psa | Jaroslava Vosmiková | | Family Film | |
| Trhák (Hit! or Boom!) | Zdeněk Podskalský | Hana Zagorová, Josef Abrhám, Juraj Kukura, Zdeněk Svěrák, Waldemar Matuška, Laďka Kozderková | comedy | written by Ladislav Smoljak and Zdeněk Svěrák |
| Vrchní, prchni! (Runaway Waiter) | Ladislav Smoljak | Josef Abrhám, Libuše Šafránková, Zdeněk Svěrák | comedy | written by Zdeněk Svěrák |
| Signum Laudis | Martin Hollý | Vlado Müller | War drama | |
1981
| Pozor, vizita! | Karel Kachyňa | Rudolf Hrušínský | comedy | |
| Tajemství hradu v Karpatech (A Carpathian Castle) | Oldřich Lipský | Michal Dočolomanský, Miloš Kopecký, Evelyna Steimarová, Rudolf Hrušínský, Jan Hartl | parody | from a novel by Jules Verne |
| Ta chvíle, ten okamžik | Jiří Sequens | | Drama | Entered into the 12th Moscow International Film Festival |
1982
| Jak svět přichází o básníky | Dušan Klein | Pavel Kříž, David Matásek, Miroslava Šafránková | comedy | |
| Neúplné zatmění | Jaromil Jireš | | Drama | Submitted for Academy Award for Best Foreign Language Film, entered into Berlin |
| She Grazed Horses on Concrete | Štefan Uher | Milka Zimková, Veronika Jeníková | Tragicomedy | Entered into the 13th Moscow International Film Festival |
1983
| Sněženky a machři | Karel Smyczek | Veronika Freimanová, Radovan Brzobohatý, Jan Antonín Duchoslav, Václav Kopta, Michal Suchánek, Eva Jeníčková (Ava Jansen) | comedy | |
| Anděl s ďáblem v těle (Angel with the Devil inside) | Václav Matějka | Zdena Studenková, Božidara Turzonovová, Karel Heřmánek, Jiří Císler | erotic comedy | |
| Tři veteráni (Three Veterans) | Oldřich Lipský | Rudolf Hrušínský, Petr Čepek, Josef Somr, Lubomír Lipský | fairy tale | from a novel by Jan Werich |
| Faunovo velmi pozdní odpoledne | Věra Chytilová | Leoš Suchařípa | Comedy | |
| Sestřičky (Nurses) | Karel Kachyňa | Alena Mihulová, Jiřina Jirásková | bitter comedy | from a novel by Adolf Branald |
1984
| Co je vám, doktore? | Vít Olmer | Ivona Krajčovičová, Zdeněk Svěrák | bitter comedy | |
| Komediant | Otakar Vávra | Oldřich Kaiser, Martin Růžek, Jana Hlaváčová | drama | |
| Give the Devil His Due | Hynek Bočan | Vladimír Dlouhý, Ondřej Vetchý | Fairy tale | |
| Slavnosti sněženek (Snowdrop's fiesta) | Jiří Menzel | Jaromír Hanzlík, Rudolf Hrušínský, Rudolf Hrušínský jr., Petr Čepek, Josef Somr | bitter comedy | from a novel by Bohumil Hrabal |
| Slunce, seno, jahody | Zdeněk Troška | Helena Růžičková | comedy | |
| Amadeus | Miloš Forman | F. Murray Abraham, Tom Hulce | drama | the film is U.S. production (producer: Saul Zaentz), but the crew is partly Czech (director: Miloš Forman, cinematograph: Miroslav Ondříček, costume designer: Theodor Pištěk, etc.) and the location was in Prague, Barrandov studios and partly Vienna; the film received 8 Academy Awards, 4 BAFTA Awards, 4 Golden Globes and many others honours |
1985
| Jak básníci přicházejí o iluze | Dušan Klein | Pavel Kříž, David Matásek, Eva Jeníčková | comedy | |
| Jako jed | Vít Olmer | Ivona Krajčovičová, Zdeněk Svěrák | bitter comedy | |
| My Sweet Little Village | Jiří Menzel | Marián Labuda, János Bán, Rudolf Hrušínský, Rudolf Hrušínský jr., Libuše Šafránková, Petr Čepek, Jan Hartl | comedy | written by Zdeněk Svěrák, nominated for Academy Award for Best Foreign Language Film |
| Noc smaragdového měsíce | Václav Matějka | | | Entered into the 35th Berlin International Film Festival |
| Rozpuštěný a vypuštěný | Ladislav Smoljak | Jiří Zahajský, Marek Brodský, Veronika Jeníková | comedy | written by Ladislav Smoljak and Zdeněk Svěrák |
| S čerty nejsou žerty | Hynek Bočan | Vladimír Dlouhý, Ondřej Vetchý | fairy tale | |
| Scalpel, Please | Jiří Svoboda | | Psychological drama | Entered into the 14th Moscow International Film Festival |
1986
| Forbidden Dreams | Karel Kachyňa | | War drama | submitted for Academy Award for Best Foreign Language Film, entered into Moscow |
| Krysař | Jiří Barta | | Animated | screened at the 1986 Cannes Film Festival |
| Skalpel, prosím | Jiří Svoboda | | Comedy | submitted for Academy Award for Best Foreign Language Film |
1987
| Freckled Max and the Spooks | Juraj Jakubisko | | Comedy | |
| Kam, pánové, kam jdete? | Karel Kachyňa | | Comedy | |
| Why? | Karel Smyczek | | Drama | screened at the 1988 Cannes Film Festival |
| Vlčí bouda (Wolf's Hole) | Věra Chytilová | Jiří Macháček | sci-fi horror | 1987 Berlinale |
| Princess Jasnenka and the Flying Shoemaker | Zdeněk Troška | Michaela Kuklová, Jan Potmesil | fantasy | |
1988
| Jak básníkům chutná život | Dušan Klein | Pavel Kříž, David Matásek, Eva Vejmělková, Jana Hlaváčová | comedy | |
| Pražská pětka | Tomáš Vorel | | Comedy | |
| Něco z Alenky | Jan Švankmajer | Kristýna Kohoutová | animation fantasy | |
1989
| Čas sluhů | Irena Pavlásková | | Psychological drama | |
| Devet kruhu pekla | Milan Muchna | | Drama | screened at the 1989 Cannes Film Festival |
| A Hoof Here, a Hoof There | Věra Chytilová | | Drama | Submitted for Academy Award for Best Foreign Language Film, entered into Moscow |
| I Love, You Love | Dušan Hanák | | Romantic drama | Hanák won the Silver Bear for Best Director at Berlin |
