= Konec básníků v Čechách =

1993 Czech comedy film

- Directed by: Dušan Klein
- Written by: Dušan Klein; Ladislav Pecháček
- Screenplay by: Dušan Klein; Ladislav Pecháček
- Produced by: Daniela Stašková
- Starring: Pavel Kříž; David Matásek; Tereza Brodská; Míla Myslíková
- Cinematography: Josef Vaniš
- Edited by: Jiří Brožek
- Music by: Zdeněk Rytíř
- Distributed by: Heureka Production
- Release date: 22 July 1993
- Running time: 115 minutes
- Country: Czech Republic
- Language: Czech

Konec básníků v Čechách is a 1993 Czech comedy film directed by Dušan Klein and written by Klein with Ladislav Pecháček. The fourth installment in the "Poets hexalogy", the title is preceded by How the World Is Losing Poets (1982), How Poets Are Losing Their Illusions (1985), and How Poets Are Enjoying Their Lives (1988), and followed by Jak básníci neztrácejí naději (2004) and Jak básníci čekají na zázrak (2016). The film stars Pavel Kříž, David Matásek, Tereza Brodská, and Míla Myslíková. Set to a backdrop of the turbulent social changes after the Velvet Revolution in Czechoslovakia, the story focuses on Štěpán's struggle to adapt to new conditions brought about by the introduction of capitalism to the nation.

== Synopsis ==
A few years after the Velvet Revolution, much has changed in Štěpán's life, as well as in his country. His best friend, Kendy, who now works as a reporter and advertising director, records an interview with Štěpán, which leads to the doctor's expulsion from the hospital where he works. He returns to his native Hradiště, where things have also changed. His mother still works as a seamstress, and she tries to find a job and partner for her divorced, unemployed, and disillusioned son. While hunting for jobs, several of which he rejects on moral grounds, Štěpán meets the sensitive and principled pharmacist Ute. In the end, Štěpán accepts work in a monastery, where nuns take care of mentally disabled children.

== Cast and characters ==
- Pavel Kříž as Štěpán Šafránek
- David Matásek as Kendy
- Tereza Brodská as Ute
- Míla Myslíková as Štepán's mother
- Lenka Kořínková as Vránová
- Ondřej Vetchý as Karabec
- Josef Somr as Prof. Ječmen
- Eva Vejmělková as Alena
- Adriana Tarábková as Jeskyňka
- Barbora Štěpánová as Bedřiška
- Jana Hlaváčová as Tonička
- Pavel Zedníček as Písařík
- Marek Vašut as doctor
- Oldřich Navrátil as Nádeníček
- Josef Větrovec as director
- Tomáš Töpfer as Dr. Sahulák
- Antonín Procházka as hospital director
- Stanislav Zindulka as Lorenc
- Miroslav Táborský as Hanousek
- Hana Ševčíková as nun
- Markéta Hrubešová as secretary
- Stanislava Bartošová as patient
- Jaroslava Obermaierová as madam
