= How Poets Wait for a Miracle =

2016 Czech comedy film

- Poster
- Czech: Jak básníci čekají na zázrak
- Directed by: Dušan Klein
- Written by: Ladislav Pecháček
- Screenplay by: Ladislav Pecháček
- Produced by: Milos Šmídmajer
- Starring: Pavel Kříž; David Matásek
- Cinematography: Peter Beňa
- Edited by: Libor Merta
- Music by: Jaroslav Uhlíř
- Production company: Bio Illusion
- Release date: 14 April 2016
- Running time: 120 minutes
- Country: Czech Republic
- Language: Czech
- Box office: $693,741

How Poets Wait for a Miracle (Czech: Jak básníci čekají na zázrak) is a 2016 Czech comedy film directed by Dušan Klein and written by Ladislav Pecháček. The final installment in the "Poets hexalogy", the title is preceded by How the World Is Losing Poets (1982), How Poets Are Losing Their Illusions (1985), How Poets Are Enjoying Their Lives (1988), Konec básníků v Čechách (1993), and Jak básníci neztrácejí naději (2004). The film stars Pavel Kříž and David Matásek as two lifelong friends, now in their fifties and still looking for love and the perfect job, and now also dealing with a child.

== Synopsis ==
Štěpán's wife, Anička, with whom he fell in love in the last film, has died and left him as a single dad and a 50-year-old hypochondriac. His two close friends, Kendy and Karas, help him raise his son, Štěpán Jr. Kendy has decided he is done directing commercials; instead, he wants to try his hand at making a feature film. Štěpán works as the deputy head of the hospital ward and fights constantly with Vendulka, the new director. His attractive neighbour, Zuzana, a photographer, becomes his new love interest.

== Cast and characters ==
- Pavel Kříž as Štěpán Šafránek
- David Matásek as Kendy
- Filip Antonio as Štěpán Šafránek Jr.
- Lukáš Vaculík as Karas
- Linda Rybová as Zuzana
- Emily Laura Hassmannová as Vanesa / Eva Rybářová
- Josef Somr as Prof. Ječmen
- Eva Jeníčková as Vendulka
- Denisa Nesvačilová as Majka
- Tereza Brodská as Ute
- Eva Holubová as head nurse Vojtěcha
- Nela Boudová as schoolteacher, Karas's girlfriend
- Miroslav Táborský as Hanousek
- Kateřina Táborská as Hanousková
- Pavel Zedníček as Písařík
- Martin Kraus as Písařík Jr.
- Oldřich Navrátil as Nádeníček
- Václav Svoboda as Venoš Pastyřík
- Tomáš Töpfer as Dr. Sahulák
- František Ringo Čech as lifeguard Bouchal
- Markéta Hrubešová as Ivetka
- Henrieta Hornácková as assistant Vycpálková
- Jiří Strach as hotel porter
- Jiří Lábus as old man
- Rudolf Hrušínský Jr. as old man
- Josef Abrhám as old man
- Libuše Švormová as nurse
- Leoš Mareš as doctor
