= Zedníček =

Zedníček (feminine: Zedníčková) is a Czech surname. It is a Czech name of the bird 'wallcreeper', but it is also a diminutive of the surname Zedník and the word zedník (meaning 'bricklayer', 'mason'). Notable people with the surname include:

- Jiří Zedníček (born 1945), Czech basketball player
- Lucie Zedníčková (born 1968), Czech actress
- Pavel Zedníček (born 1949), Czech actor
