= Letiště =

- Genre: Drama
- Starring: Anna Šišková; Maroš Kramár; David Matásek; Vojtěch Dyk; Matouš Ruml; Jitka Schneiderová; Bohumil Klepl; Zuzana Norisová; Pavel Zedníček; Zuzana Bydžovská; Linda Rybová; Pavel Řezníček
- Country of origin: Czech Republic
- Original language: Czech
- No. of seasons: 2
- No. of episodes: 118

Production
- Running time: 50 minutes

Original release
- Network: Prima televize
- Release: September 4, 2006 – December 19, 2007

Letiště (Airport) is a Czech drama television series that was broadcast by Prima televize in 2006 and 2007. It takes place at two airports, at the Prague airport in Ruzyně, where it tells about the fictitious airline company Central Airlines, and at the small airport Točná. The series premiered on TV Prima on September 4, 2006, and ended after 118 episodes of two series on December 19, 2007, on Prima.

The series primarily focused on relationship between flight attendant Anna Holubcová and Václav Schindler. Viola Antošová replaced Anna in the second season after Anna's death.

On 17 October 2007, it was confirmed that the series was cancelled after season 2 and will end after 118 episodes.

== Plot ==
=== Season 1 ===
Flight attendant Anna lives a fairly peaceful relationship with steward Karel. Karel is her superior and they cannot avoid minor conflicts, but so far it has worked out quite well for them. But Anna confides in her best friend Lucie that something still draws her to Václav, her former partner with whom she lived for almost 12 years. However, Václav also likes to remember her sometimes, but he can't it too much, because his current partner Martina always recognizes everything about him. Václav is a widower who has a stepson Tomáš, whose mother died in one of the tragic accidents. Václav used to take care of his son together with Anna. His best friend and co-worker is Pavel Kučera who owns a plane and hangars at Točná, but he doesn't really feel like a boss and manages the airport together with Václav.

=== Season 2 ===
Anna died tragically. Václav is having a hard time recovering from her death. He has to be brave for his one-year-old daughter Anežka, whom he cares deeply about, even though she is not his biological daughter. He solves this situation by turning to alcohol. In this difficult time, young and beautiful Viola joins Central Airlines as a pilot, and Václav fall in love with her. However, this love is not accepted by several people and both have to fight for it.

== Cast ==
- Maroš Kramár as Václav Schindler
- David Matásek as Karel Halama
- Bohumil Klepl as Roman Fila
- Zuzana Norisová as Petra Antlová
- Pavel Zedníček as Tonda Robinzon (season 2)
- Zuzana Bydžovská as Tereza Holerová
- Linda Rybová as Viola Antošová Schindlerová (season 2)
- Pavel Řezníček as Robert Schindler
- Anna Šišková as Anna Holubcová Schindlerová (season 1)
- Vojtěch Dyk as Tomáš Schindler
- Matouš Ruml as Vítek Halas (season 1)
- Jitka Schneiderová as Martina Slatinská (season 1)
