= How Poets Are Enjoying Their Lives =

1988 Czechoslovak comedy film

- Czech: Jak básníkům chutná život
- Directed by: Dušan Klein
- Written by: Dušan Klein; Ladislav Pecháček
- Starring: Pavel Kříž; David Matásek; Eva Vejmělková
- Cinematography: Josef Vaniš
- Edited by: Jiří Brožek
- Music by: Zdeněk Marat
- Production company: Barrandov Studios
- Release date: 1 June 1988
- Running time: 102 minutes
- Country: Czechoslovakia
- Language: Czech

How Poets Are Enjoying Their Lives (Czech: Jak básníkům chutná život) is a 1988 Czechoslovak comedy film directed by Dušan Klein and written by Klein with Ladislav Pecháček. The third installment in the "Poets hexalogy", the title is preceded by How the World Is Losing Poets (1982) and How Poets Are Losing Their Illusions (1985), and followed by Konec básníků v Čechách (1993), Jak básníci neztrácejí naději (2004), and Jak básníci čekají na zázrak (2016). The film stars Pavel Kříž and David Matásek, and revisits the lives of Štěpán Šafránek and his best friend, Kendy, as they navigate their respective personal and professional lives.

== Synopsis ==
After successfully completing his medical studies, Štěpán Šafránek joins the internal ward of the district hospital as a doctor. FAMU graduate Kendy obtains the position of assistant director at Czechoslovak Television and is filming a series in his hometown of Hradiště. After having problems with the chief physician at his hospital, Štěpán is transferred to the position of district doctor in Bezdíkov, where he meets his new love—music teacher Alena Hubáčková. The couple eventually moves to the north of the country.

== Cast and characters ==
- Pavel Kříž as Štěpán Šafránek
- David Matásek as Kendy
- Eva Vejmělková as Alena
- Jana Hlaváčová as Tonička
- Rudolf Hrušínský as Hubáček
- Míla Myslíková as Štepán's mother
- Josef Dielle as Numira "Mireček"
- Eva Jeníčková as Vendulka "Utěšitelka"
- Karel Roden as Honza Antoš
- Václav Svoboda as Venoš Pastyřík
- Tomáš Töpfer as Dr. Sahulák
- Pavel Zedníček as Písařík
- Blažena Holišová as Hubáčková
- Rostislav Kuba as Teacher Hájek
- Věra Vlčková as Chief physician, nicknamed Obočenka
- František Filipovský as Adolf Valerián
- Josef Somr as Prof. Ječmen
- Ondřej Vetchý as Karabec
