= Zednik =

Zednik may refer to:

- Zedník, a Czech surname
- Žednik, several places in Serbia
- Heinz Zednik (born 1940), Austrian opera singer
