= Jak básníci neztrácejí naději =

2004 Czech comedy film

- Directed by: Dušan Klein
- Written by: Dušan Klein; Ladislav Pecháček
- Screenplay by: Dušan Klein; Ladislav Pecháček
- Produced by: Milos Šmídmajer
- Starring: Pavel Kříž; David Matásek; Michaela Badinková; Tereza Brodská
- Cinematography: Peter Beňa
- Edited by: Petr Svoboda
- Music by: Jaroslav Uhlíř
- Production companies: Bio Illusion; Pluto Film & Video
- Release date: 22 January 2004
- Running time: 120 minutes
- Country: Czech Republic
- Language: Czech
- Box office: $549,372

Jak básníci neztrácejí naději is a 2004 Czech comedy film directed by Dušan Klein and written by Klein with Ladislav Pecháček. The fifth installment in the "Poets hexalogy", the title is preceded by How the World Is Losing Poets (1982), How Poets Are Losing Their Illusions (1985), How Poets Are Enjoying Their Lives (1988), and Konec básníků v Čechách (1993), and followed by Jak básníci čekají na zázrak (2016). The film stars Pavel Kříž, David Matásek, Michaela Badinková, and Tereza Brodská. The story focuses on Štěpán, now in his forties, and the tribulations he undergoes with work and love.

== Synopsis ==
After the death of his mother, Štěpán, now in his forties, tries to decide what to do with his life. He gets a new job as a doctor with an ambulance service, but his relationship with Ute, with whom he fell in love in the previous film, is slowly collapsing. His best friend, Kendy, asks to move in after his wife kicks him out. The two men take this reversal of fortunes with good humour, and at first, bachelorhood even has a certain appeal. Štěpán is offered the post of director at a hospital, and there he meets Anička and falls in love all over again. Anička doesn't think Štěpán is over Ute, however, and she leaves. He finds her seven months later, pregnant with his child.

== Cast and characters ==
- Pavel Kříž as Štěpán Šafránek
- David Matásek as Kendy
- Michaela Badinková as Anička Posedlá
- Tereza Brodská as Ute
- Lukáš Vaculík as Karas
- Miroslav Táborský as Hanousek
- Josef Somr as Prof. Ječmen
- Jana Hlaváčová as Tonička
- Adriana Karembeu as Madame Krásná (as Adriana Sklenaříková)
- Pavel Zedníček as Písařík
- Oldřich Navrátil as Nádeníček
- Hoa Nguyen Khac as Mr. Ceng
- Leoš Mareš as rebel
- Tomáš Töpfer as Dr. Sahulák
- Markéta Hrubešová as Ivetka
- Eva Jeníčková as Vendulka
- Lenka Kořínková as Sylvie (as Lenka Holas Kořínková)
- Jitka Kocurová as waitress Kamila
- Otmar Brancuzský as gynecologist Vyhnálek
- Vlastimil Zavřel as Vorel
- Václav Knop as Dr. Voříšek
