= My Uncle Archimedes =

- Written by: Petr Hudský, Georgis Agathonikiadis
- Directed by: Georgis Agathonikiadis
- Starring: Ondřej Vetchý, Miroslav Donutil
- Music by: Aleš Březina
- Countries of origin: Czech Republic; France; Germany
- Original language: Czech

Production
- Cinematography: Petr Hojda
- Running time: 90 minutes
- Production company: ČT

Original release
- Release: 14 January 2018

My Uncle Archimedes (Czech: Můj strýček Archimedes) is a 2018 Czech comedy film directed by Georgis Agathonikiadis. It stars Ondřej Vetchý and Miroslav Donutil.

== Plot ==
The film is about Greek communist Archimedes who is forced to leave his country due to Greek Civil War. He comes to Czechoslovakia with his wife and nephew Aris. He befriends his new neighbour Karel Novák.

== Cast ==
- Ondřej Vetchý as Archimedes
- Miroslav Donutil as Karel Novák
- Veronika Freimanová as Jarmila Nováková
- Dana Černá as Penelope
- Jiří Dvořák as State Security Captain
- Tomáš Töpfer as Goldstein
- Oldřich Navrátil as Bureš
- Jaromír Dulava as Chairman of Local Committee
- Stanislav Zindulka as Přibyl
- Kristýna Boková as Simona
- Martin Havelka as Head of the Farm
