= Jana Synková =

Czech actress (1944–2024)

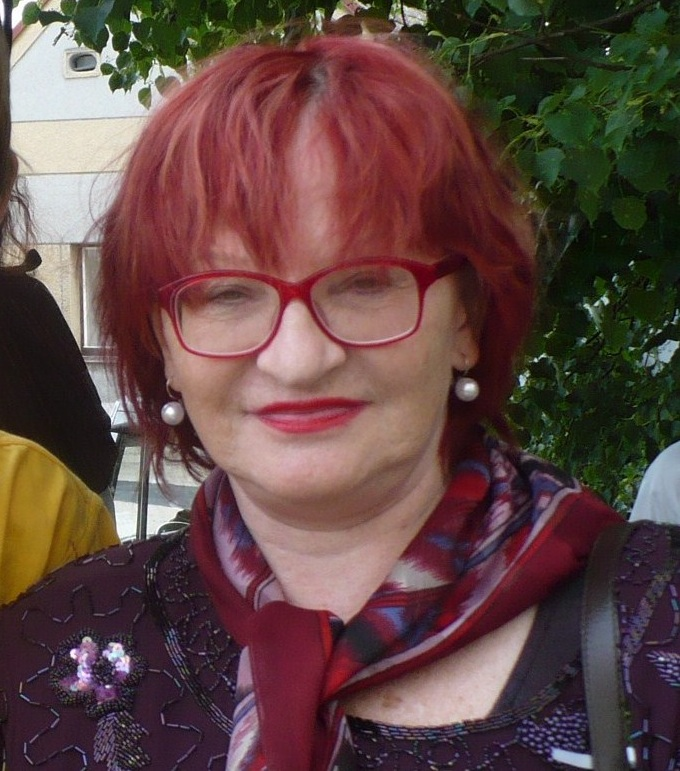
- Synková in 2012
- Born: 18 April 1944; Prague, Protectorate of Bohemia and Moravia
- Died: 28 December 2024 (aged 80); Prague, Czech Republic
- Occupation: Actress
- Years active: 1964–2019
- Spouse: Jan Schmid (m. 1974; died 2024)
- Children: 2

Jana Synková (18 April 1944 – 28 December 2024) was a Czech actress.

== Early life and career ==
Jana Synková was born during World War II in Prague, then the Protectorate of Bohemia and Moravia. Her maternal grandparents were well-known theatre personalities and she attended an acting club from an early age.

After graduating from high school, Synková was accepted to the theatre in Mladá Boleslav for a year. She studied acting at the Theatre Faculty of the Academy of Performing Arts in Prague and graduated in 1967. During her studies, she attended the Maringotka experimental theatre from 1964 to 1965. In 1967 she got her first engagement at the F. X. Šalda Theatre in Liberec, where she played several supporting roles. In 1969, she joined the ensemble of the Naive Theatre in Liberec. In the 1970s, there were important changes in theatre culture here, with the formation of the Ypsilon Theatre, which moved to Prague at the end of 1978. Here, Synková developed comedic skills with a preference for the grotesque. She toured all over Europe with the Ypsilon Theatre. In 1974, she received the Literature Fund's Creative Award.

From the mid-1960s, she appeared in small film roles, including in the 1969 film Farářův konec. After the Ypsilon Theatre moved to Prague, more opportunities to work in film and television arose, so that she took on several supporting roles in the 1970s and 1980s. In the 1990s, larger roles followed, for example, she played Aunt Kateřina in the 1994 film Saturnin, for whose performance she was nominated for the Czech Lion Awards as Best Supporting Actress. In 1996 she played a psychologist in the film Kamenný most, in the three parts of the film project Byl jednou jeden polda. In the television series Život na zámku she played the director. In 2019 she was again nominated for the Czech Lion for Best Supporting Actress for the film Chata na prodej.

== Personal life and death ==
Synková married Jan Schmid (1936–2024) in 1974, with whom she had two children. She died on 28 December 2024, half a year after her husband, after a long illness, at a sanatorium in Prague. Synková was 80.
