= Dobří holubi se vracejí =

- Directed by: Dušan Klein
- Written by: Dušan Klein, Ladislav Pecháček
- Starring: Milan Kňažko
- Cinematography: Josef Vaniš
- Edited by: Jiří Brožek
- Music by: Harry Macourek
- Distributed by: Ústřední půjčovna filmů
- Release date: 1987
- Running time: 109 minutes
- Country: Czechoslovakia
- Language: Czech

Dobří holubi se vracejí is a Czech dark comedy from the Alcohol Treatment Centre. It was directed by Dušan Klein, released in 1987.

== Cast ==
- Milan Kňažko as Miloš Lexa
- Rudolf Hrušínský as Masák
- Alicja Jachiewicz as Soňa Landová
- Vladimír Menšík as Honzíček
- Pavel Zedníček as Mutzlinger
- Jiří Hálek as Čtvrtečka
- Marián Labuda as Dorenda
- Zdeněk Řehoř as Zlámal
- Radan Rusev as Janošík
- Rudolf Hrušínský ml. as Obuli
- Jan Přeučil as Doctor Vonka
- Josef Somr as senior doctor Dorotka
- Evelyna Steimarová as Irena
- Petr Čepek as Uncle Karel
- Oldřich Navrátil as Doctor Křížek
- Josef Somr as Dobrotka
- Eva Vejmělková
