= Kousek nebe =

2005 Czech romance film

- Directed by: Petr Nikolaev
- Written by: Jirí Stránský
- Produced by: Jaroslav Kučera
- Starring: Jakub Doubrava
- Cinematography: Martin Duba
- Release date: 10 February 2005
- Running time: 88 minutes
- Country: Czech Republic
- Language: Czech

Kousek nebe ("A Piece of Heaven") is a 2005 Czech romance film directed by Petr Nikolaev.

== Plot ==
The film, set in a Czechoslovak prison in the 1950s, focuses on the romantic relationship between two unjustly sentenced inmates, Luboš and Dana, as they try to survive under hard prison conditions.

== Cast ==
- Jakub Doubrava - Lubos
- Tatiana Pauhofová - Dana (as Tána Pauhofová)
- Petr Forman - Bruno
- Ondřej Vetchý - Rusnák
- Pavel Zednícek - Roubal
- Vladimír Javorský - Sebek
- Karel Zima - Dráb
- Zuzana Stivínová - Dorota
- Lenka Vychodilová - Kredenc
- Josef Somr - Prisoner
- Petr Vacek - Prisoner
- Pavel Landovský - Starej
- Jan Vondráček - Warder

== Reception ==
Kousek nebe received positive reviews, and was nominated for five Czech Lion awards.
