= Michaela Dolinová =

Czech actress and TV presenter

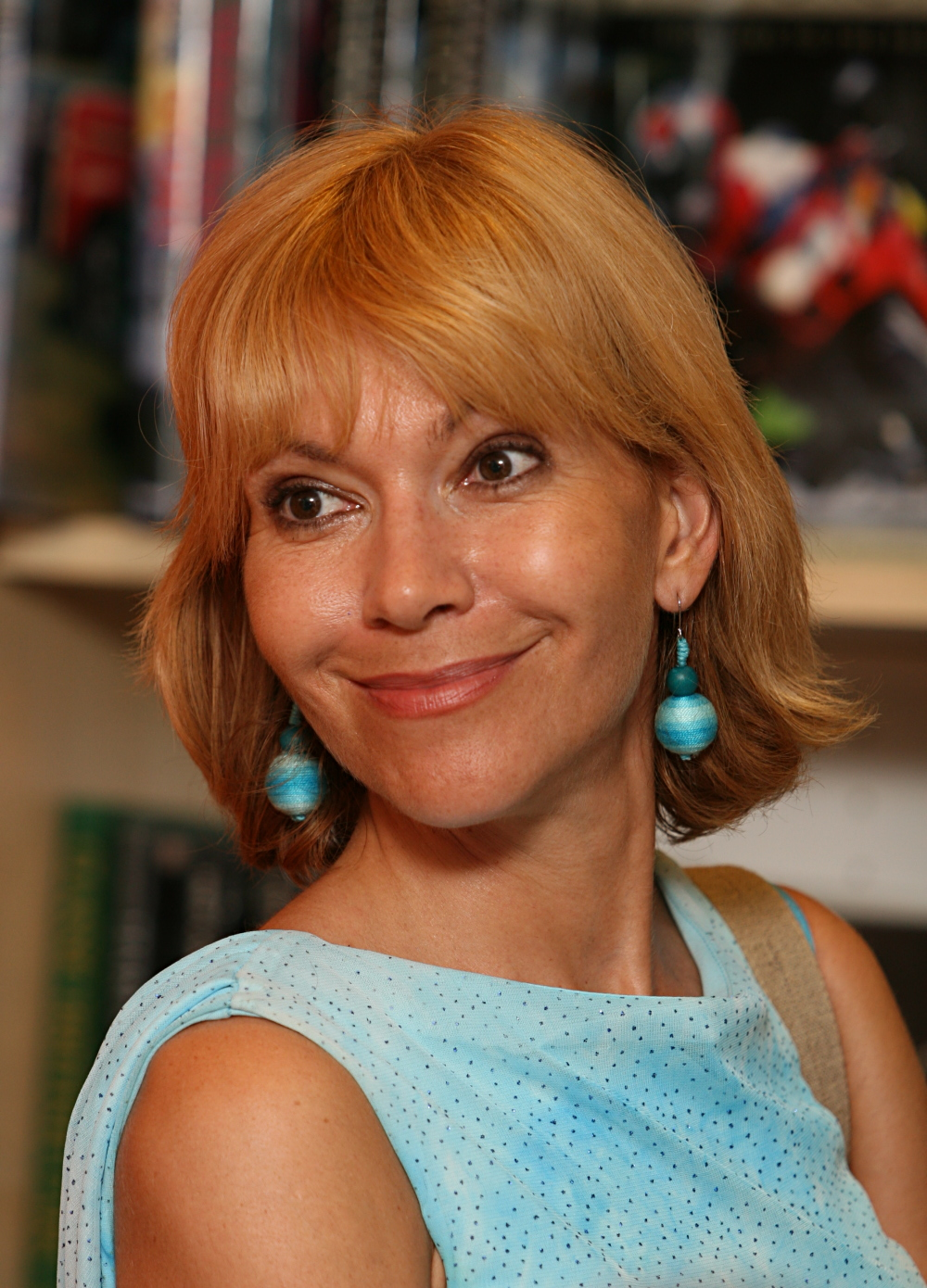
- Michaela Dolinová (2008)
- Born: 16 March 1964 (age 61); Třinec, Czechoslovakia
- Occupation(s): Actress, TV presenter
- Years active: 1965–present
- Spouses: Jaroslav Tuček (m. 1993–2008); Jan Sváček (m. 2009)
- Children: 2

Michaela Dolinová (born 16 March 1964 in Třinec, Czechoslovakia) is a Czech actress and TV presenter. She studied in Prague before moving to the Kladno theatre where she played in a variety of classical roles. She also performed in the Semafor Theatre in Prague with fellow actor Josef Dvořák.

In 1993 she moved to Musical Theatre Karlín featuring in several musicals in a range of different roles.

After working as a weather girl on television for several years, she is currently a presenter on TV breakfast show Snídaně s Novou (Breakfast with Nova) which airs on the Czech TV channel Nova.

== Personal life ==
She lives in Prague with her husband and two daughters, Julinka and Tereza.

== Filmography ==
- Ulice (2005) - TV series
- Ordinace v růžové zahradě (2005) - TV series
- Agáta (1999)
- Taneční hodiny pro starší a pokročilé (1991)
- Uzavřený okruh (1989)
- Chlapci a chlapi (1988)
- Jak básníci přicházejí o iluze (1985)
