= Three Brothers (2014 film) =

- Directed by: Jan Svěrák
- Written by: Zdeněk Svěrák
- Produced by: Jan Svěrák
- Starring: Tomáš Klus, Vojtěch Dyk, Zdeněk Piškula
- Cinematography: Vladimír Smutný
- Edited by: Alois Fišárek
- Music by: Jaroslav Uhlíř, Michal Novinski
- Production companies: Biograf Jan Svěrák; Phoenix Film; Novinski
- Distributed by: Bioscop
- Release date: 14 August 2014
- Running time: 90 minutes
- Countries: Czech Republic; Denmark
- Language: Czech
- Budget: CZK 42 million
- Box office: CZK 73.5 million

Three Brothers (Czech: Tři bratři) is a 2014 Czech film directed by Jan Svěrák and written by his father, Zdeněk Svěrák.

== Plot ==
The film is about brothers Jan, Pepa and Matěj. They set up to find a bride. The film is divided into three parts. Each part follow one brother as he finds his love. Jan saves Sleeping Beauty and a cursed Kingdom. Jan then marries Sleeping Beauty and becomes new King. Matěj becomes Gamekeeper in Jan's forest. He saves Little Red Riding Hood and her Grandmother from evil Wolf. Matěj is then promised to marry Little Red Riding Hood when she becomes old enough. Pepa falls in love with Maruška who lives her Stepmother and her Stepsister Holena. Stepmother tries to get him to marry Holena but Pepa rejects her and eventually marries Maruška.

== Cast ==
- Tomáš Klus as Jan
- Vojtěch Dyk as Pepa
- Zdeněk Piškula as Matěj
- Kateřina Kosová as Sleeping Beauty
- Sabina Rojková as Maruška
- Gabriela Míčová as Mother of the brothers
- Oldřich Kaiser as Father of the brothers
- Zuzana Norisová as Queen
- Kamil Halbich as Counsellor
- Zdeněk Svěrák as Teacher
- Jan Holík as Counsellor
- David Matásek as King
- Lucie Maria Štouračová as Little Red Riding Hood
- Petr Reidinger as Father of Little Red Riding Hood
- Jitka Čvančarová as Mother of Little Red Riding Hood
- Jitka Smutná as Grandmother of Little Red Riding Hood
- Ivana Chýlková as Stepmother
- Alena Doláková as Holena
- Jiří Lábus as Witch
