= Daniel Landa =

Czech musician and actor (born 1968)

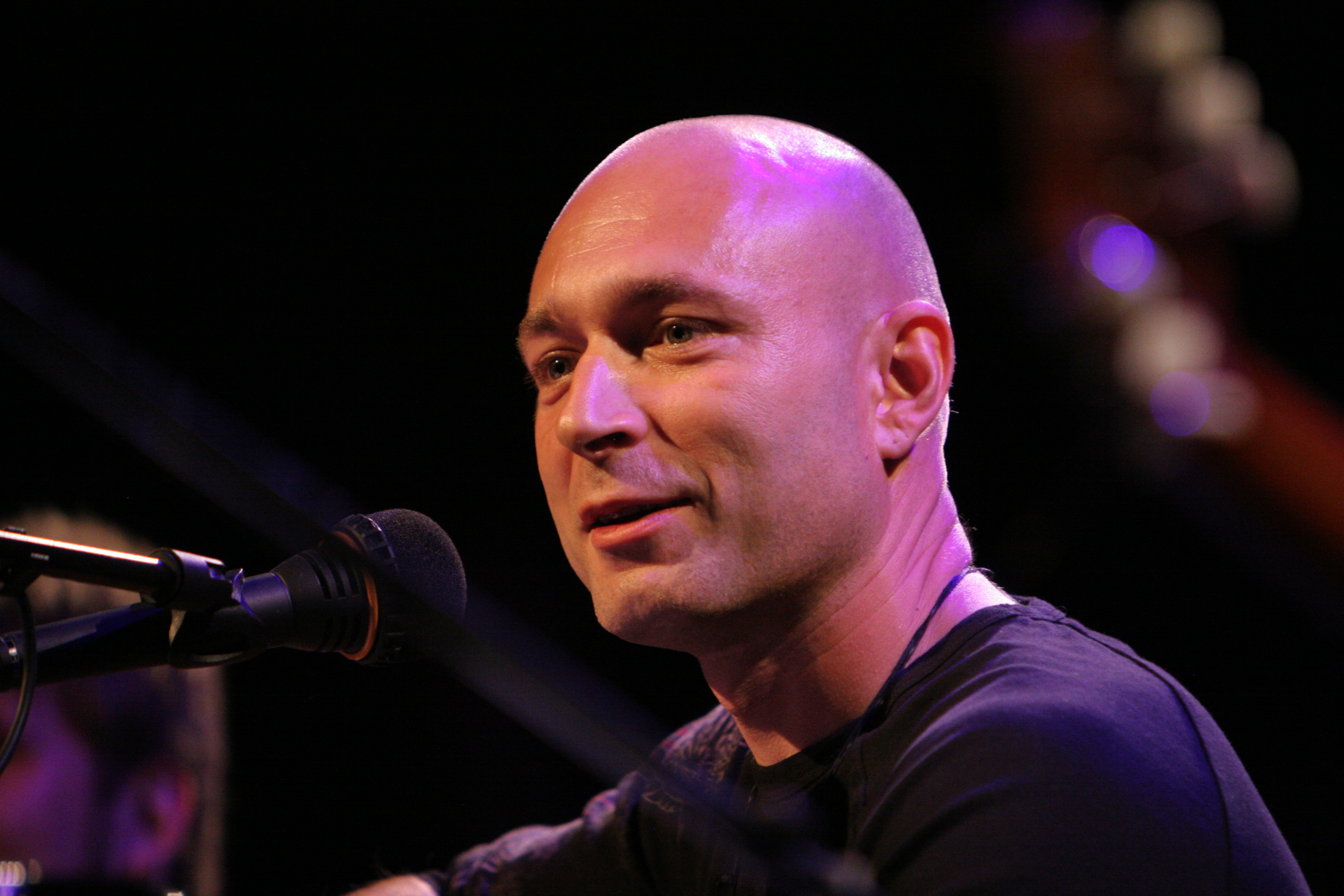
- Landa performing in 2007

Background information
- Also known as: Kouzelník Žito 44
- Born: 4 November 1968 (age 57); Prague, Czechoslovakia (now Czech Republic)
- Genres: Oi!; rock; folk rock
- Occupations: Musician; actor; car racer
- Instruments: Vocals; guitar
- Years active: 1987–present
- Formerly of: Orlík
- Website: daniellanda.cz

Daniel Landa (born 4 November 1968) is a Czech musician, actor, car racer, and amateur muay thai fighter. Born in Prague, Landa graduated with honours from Prague Conservatory, having studied music and drama. He began his musical career in 1988 when he, along with David Matásek, founded the oi! band Orlík, with whom he released two albums. Orlík has been criticized for its racist overtones, targeting specifically the Gypsy minority in the Czech Republic. In 1993, he began recording as a solo artist, and has since released numerous albums. He has also composed music for films and written several musicals. His material often deals with patriotic and political themes.

== Career ==
=== Orlík ===
In 1988, together with the actor David Matásek, Landa founded the oi! punk band Orlík, whose name was inspired by the eponymous bar in Prague. In 1990, they released their first studio album, Miloš Frýba for president (Oi!), which saw significant success. The album gained prominence within the Czechoslovak skinhead movement and garnered the band some criticism in the press and the general public for the racist overtones of some songs. The following year, they released a second, similarly controversial album, Demise, after which they broke up.

=== Solo ===
Landa began his solo career in 1993 by releasing the album Valčík, followed by Chcíply dobrý víly in 1995, Pozdrav z fronty in 1997, Smrtihlav (1998), and Konec (1999). In 2000, he issued his first compilation album, titled Best of Landa. 9mm argumentů came out in 2002, succeeded by Neofolk in 2004. That same year, he released his second compilation, titled Best of Landa 2. Landa toured extensively between 2003 and 2008, and released the live albums Vltava Tour in 2003 and Bouře in 2006. In 2009, after a break of several years, he issued his next studio album, Nigredo. This was followed by more touring, two additional live albums, Československo Tour 2008 (2011) and Vozová hradba Daniel Landa tour 2011 (2012), two more compilations, and the album Klíč králů in 2013. In 2015, Žito was released.

== Acting and theatre ==
Landa has occasionally dabbled in acting, having appeared in several films, including Why?, Who's That Soldier?, Černí baroni, as well as the German television series Alles außer Mord and the Czech series České století, in which he portrays the soldier Emanuel Moravec. He has also acted in two of his wife's films, Kvaska and Tacho.

Since the early 2000s, Landa has written music for several films, including Kvaska, and theatre productions. He has appeared in Dracula, Krysař, and Tajemství, the last two of which he wrote himself. In 2008, he wrote music for Mirjam Landa's musical Touha together with Ondřej Soukup, which was based on the film Kvaska. Landa wrote music for the play Tajemství zlatého draka (The secret of the golden dragon), which premiered in November 2008. In 2003, in collaboration with German composer Stefan Wurz, he reworked Mozart's Requiem into a rock performance titled Rockquiem, which was performed at Prague's Municipal House.

== Racing ==
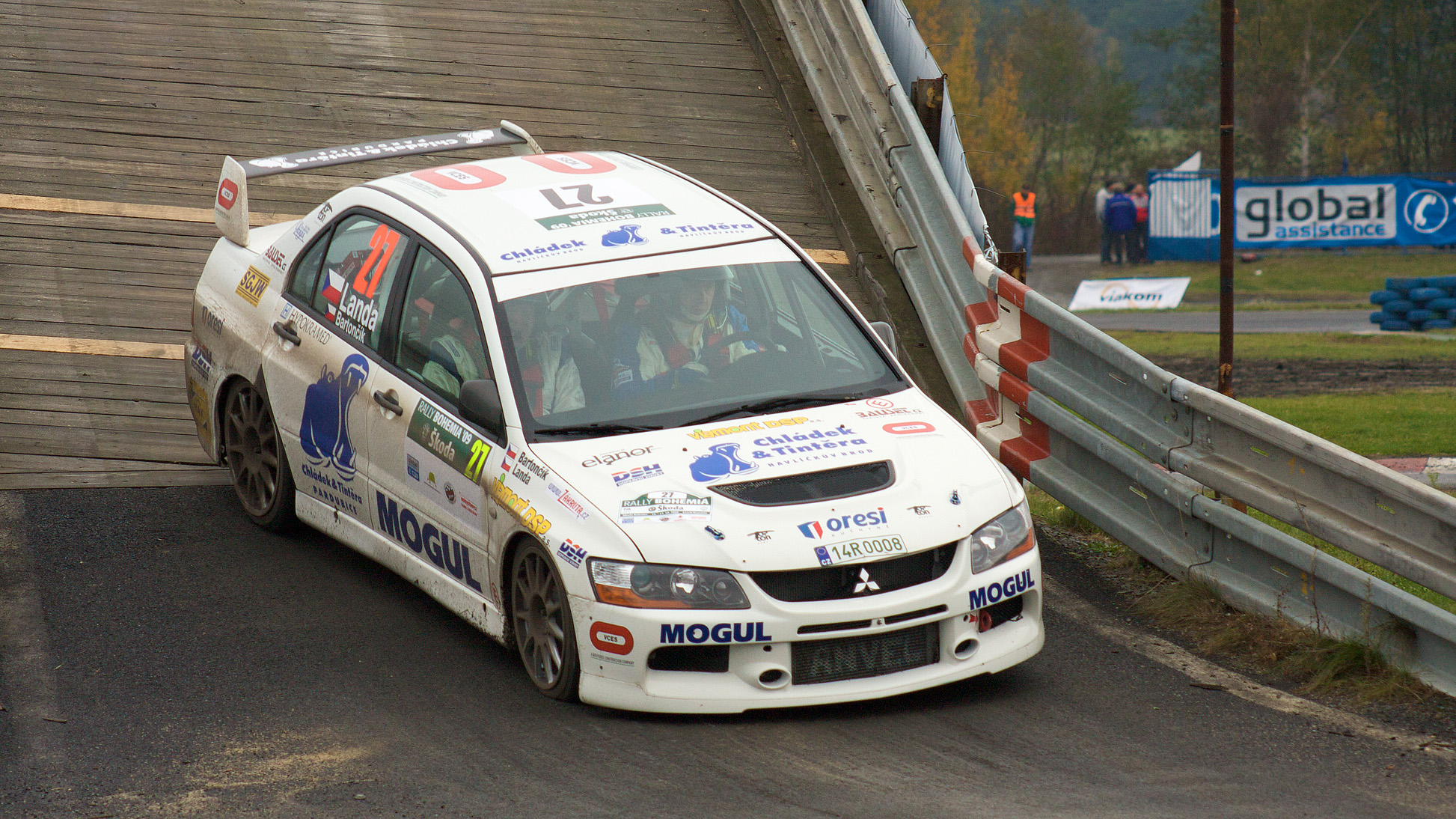
Daniel Landa driving a Mitsubishi Lancer Evolution at the Rally Bohemia 2009

Since 1996, Landa has been an autocross racer, at one point reaching 6th place in Europe. In 1998, he also began truck racing, and in 1999, he was named newcomer of the year in the Czech Republic. Since 2001, he has been an N4 category rally racer.

=== Malina Foundation ===
The Malina Foundation (Nadace Malina), founded by Landa and professional rally driver Roman Kresta, focuses on education and prevention in the field of road safety. They have made several educational films, including, Bourá jen blb? (Do only idiots crash?), Auto je zbraň (Cars are weapons), and Tacho (Tachometer).

== Kouzelník Žito 44 ==
At the end of November 2012, Landa announced the end of his musical career. He stopped using his name and started to call himself Kouzelník Žito 44 (Magician Rye 44). He caused a major controversy with his speech at the 2012 Český slavík Awards ceremony. According to some reports, he openly threatened the audience; according to others, he was a man suffering from a personal crisis. In 2016, Landa stopped using the moniker.

== COVID-19 pandemic ==
During the COVID-19 pandemic in the Czech Republic, Landa has engaged in activism against the Czech government's epidemiological measures. He used the website zlatyspendlik.cz to encourage people to carry out denial-of-service attacks against regional public health offices. His followers sent thousands of emails to health offices asking for information, to which the health offices were forced to respond, resulting in them becoming overloaded. In November 2021, the Czech Ministry of Health filed a criminal complaint against Landa on grounds of sabotage.

== Personal life ==
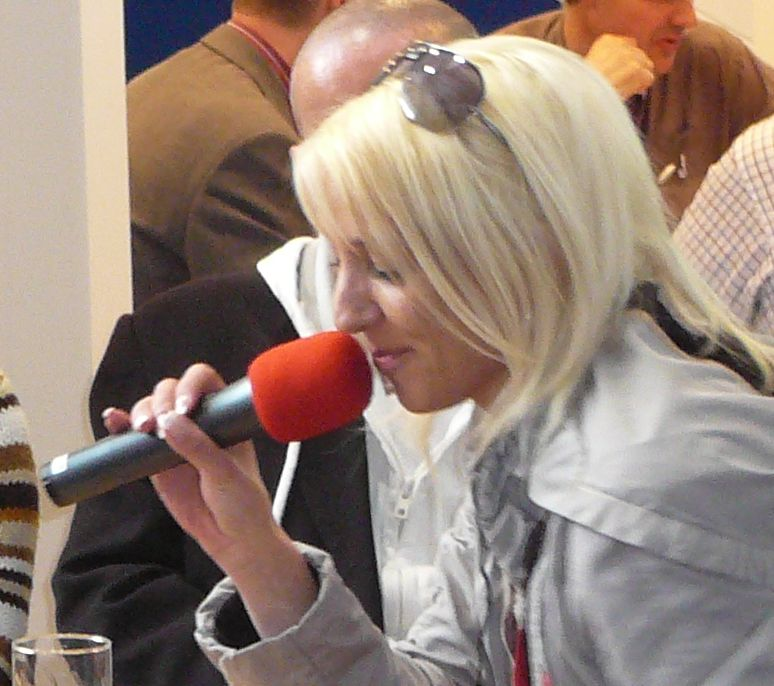
Mirjam Müller Landa at the press conference for Kvaska at the Brno Exhibition Centre, 2007

In 1990, Landa married Mirjam Müller, who was at the time a film directing student at the FAMU in Prague. Müller is originally from Cologne, Germany. They have three children.

== Discography ==
=== With Orlík ===
- Miloš Frýba for president (Oi!) (1990)
- Demise (Resignation, 1991)

=== Solo ===
Studio albums

- Valčík (Waltz, 1993)
- Chcíply dobrý víly (The Good Fairies Died, 1995)
- Pozdrav z fronty (Greetings from the Battlefront, 1997)
- Smrtihlav (Death's head, 1998) - with other artists
- Konec (The End, 1999)
- 9mm argumentů (9mm of Arguments, 2002)
- Neofolk (2004)
- Nigredo (2009)
- Klíč králů (Key of Kings, 2013)
- Žito (Rye, 2015)

Live albums

- Vltava Tour (2003)
- Bouře (Storm, 2006)
- Československo Tour 2008 (2011)
- Vozová hradba Daniel Landa tour 2011 (2012)

Compilations

- Best of Landa (2000)
- Best of Landa 2 (2004)
- Platinum Collection (2010, 3 CDs)
- Best of Landa 3 (2013)

Soundtracks

- Krysař I. (The Pied Piper I, 1996) - with other artists
- Krysař II. (The Pied Piper II, 1996) - with other artists
- Tajemství (The Secret, 2005) – with other artists
- Kvaska (2007)
- Touha (Desire, 2009)
- Tacho (2010)

=== Other appearances ===
- Večer s písní Karla Kryla pro český národ live recording of songs by Karel Kryl, with other artists (2004)
- Strážce plamene with Petr Hapka & Michal Horáček (2006)
- Strážce plamene v obrazech (video) with Hapka & Horáček (2007)

== Filmography ==
- Třetí patro (TV) (1985)
- Případ Kolman (TV) (1986)
- Why? (1987)
- Who's That Soldier? (1987)
- Kainovo znamení (1989)
- Jen o rodinných záležitostech (1990)
- Tichá bolest (1990)
- Černí baroni (1992)
- Alles außer Mord (TV) (1995, 1996)
- Kvaska (2007)
- Tacho (2010)
- České století (2013)
- Die Geliebte des Teufels (production) (2016)

== Theatre productions ==
- Krysař (1996)
- Rockquiem (2003)
- Tajemství (2005)
