= Fešák Hubert =

- Directed by: Ivo Novák
- Written by: Ivo Novák; Pavel Hanuš
- Starring: Karel Heřmánek
- Cinematography: Richard Valenta
- Edited by: Ivana Kačírková
- Music by: Petr Hapka
- Release date: 1984
- Running time: 86 minute
- Country: Czechoslovakia
- Language: Czech

Fešák Hubert ("Handsome Man Hubert") is a Czech comedy film directed by Ivo Novák. It was released in 1984.

== Cast ==
- Karel Heřmánek as Hubert Hrabě
- Petr Kostka as Mourek
- Josef Somr as Pašek
- Pavel Zedníček as Eman
- Otto Lackovič as Skákal
- Pavel Nový as Karel
- Jan Teplý as Holendr
- Zora Kerova as Růža (credited as Zora-Ulla Keslerová)
- Lubomír Lipský as Franc
- Evelyna Steimarová as Pašková
- Lubomír Kostelka as Špirk
- Jiří Holý as Kropas
- Viktor Maurer as Lón
- Jana Šulcová as Kropasová
- Ladislava Kozderková as Čuříková
