= Who's That Soldier? =

1987 Czechoslovak comedy film

- Directed by: Petr Tuček
- Written by: Petr Tuček; Pavel Hajný
- Starring: Jiří Langmajer
- Cinematography: Josef Pávek
- Music by: Petr Hapka
- Release date: 1987
- Running time: 85 minutes
- Language: Czech

Who's That Soldier? (Czech: Copak je to za vojáka...) is a Czech comedy film directed by Petr Tuček. It was released in 1987.

== Cast ==
- Jiří Langmajer as Milan Kouba
- Karel Roden as Captain Tůma
- Veronika Gajerová as Vlasta
- Václav Čížkovský as Sany
- Pavel Hejlík as Šlapetka
- Ivo Helikar as Honza
- Miriam Hynková as Grandmother
- Vítězslav Jandák as Major Průcha
- Tomás Karger as Trunacek
- Michal Kocourek
- Jan Kraus as Soldier
- Jan Kuželka
- Daniel Landa as Soldier
- Vlasta Mészárosová as Lenka
