= Eva Turnová =

Czech musician

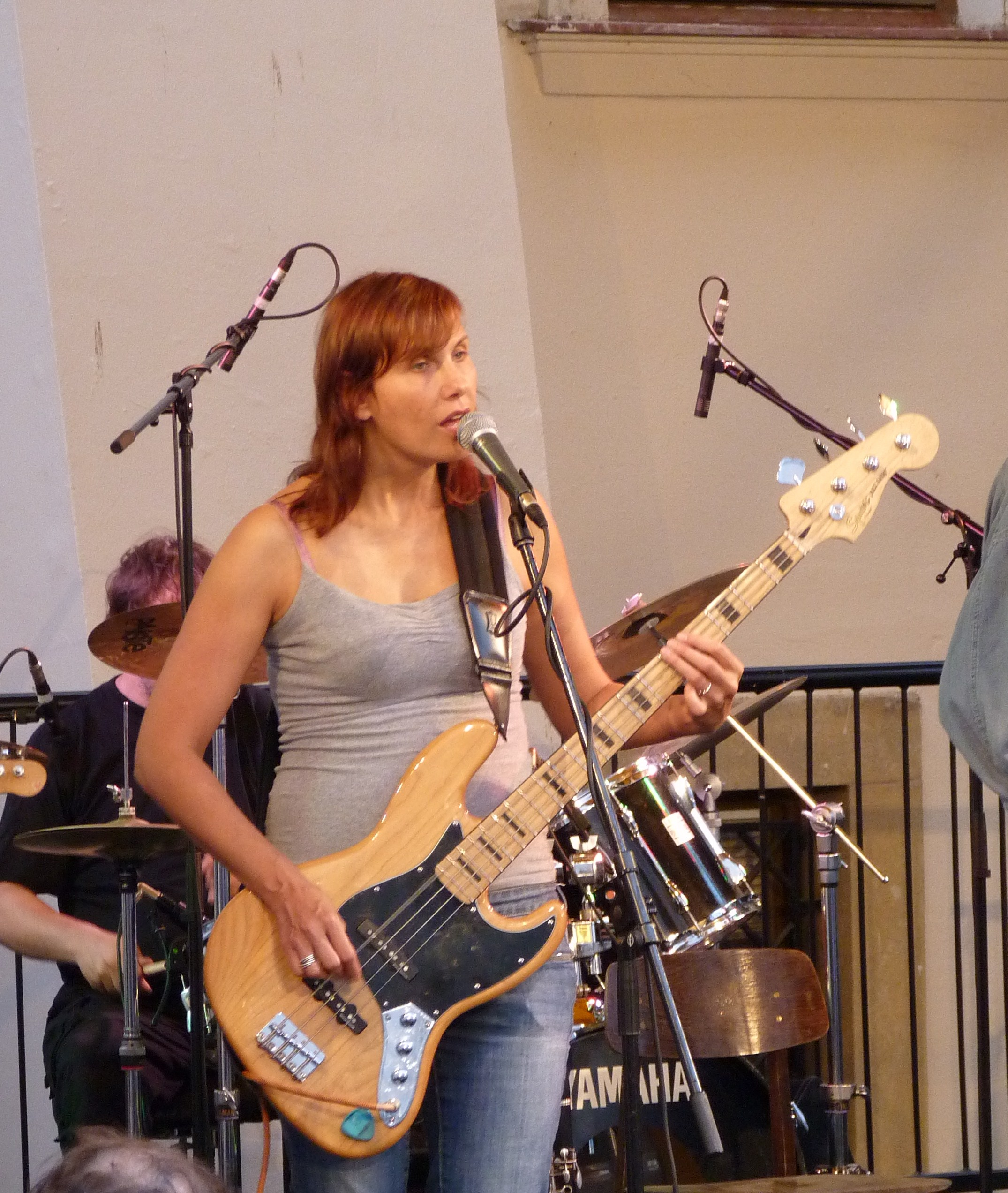
- Eva Turnová with The Plastic People of the Universe in 2010

Background information
- Born: 1964 (age 60–61)
- Occupation(s): Musician, songwriter, teacher, translator, actress
- Instrument(s): Bass guitar, vocals

Eva Turnová (born 1964) is a Czech singer, songwriter, bass guitarist, teacher, translator and actress. Since 2001 she was a member of The Plastic People of the Universe. She left the band in 2015. Between 1995 and 2001 she was a member of DG 307. Her first husband was Czech actor David Matásek (divorced five years after the wedding). In 2008, she released her first solo album called Eturnity.
