= Orlík (band) =

Czech punk band

- Origin: Prague, Czechoslovakia
- Genres: Punk rock; Oi!
- Years active: 1988–1991
- Labels: Monitor Records
- Past members: Daniel Landa; David Matásek; Jan Limburský; Jakub Maleček; Adolf Vitáček; Šimon Budský; Petr Štěpánek

Orlík was a folk-influenced Czech oi! punk band founded in 1988 from the existing hardcore punk band F.A.S. (Fetal Alcohol Syndrome) by Daniel Landa and David Matásek. They released two studio albums and broke up in 1991.

== History ==
The group was named after the Orlík winery, where the band members met. It originally consisted of Daniel Landa (vocals), David Matásek (guitar), Petr Štěpánek (guitar), Šimon Budský (bass), and Adolf Vitáček (drums). Vitáček left in 1989 to play with Wanastowi Vjecy and Plexis, and was replaced by Jan Limburský. Budský and Štěpánek also left shortly after. Jakub Maleček joined on bass, and the lineup of the quartet remained stable until their eventual breakup.

Orlík had a short career, releasing only two albums, 1990's Oi! (also known as Miloš Frýba for president) and 1991's Demise. The lyrical themes of their songs were strongly nationalistic ("Bílej jezdec", "Vozová hradba") and xenophobic, such as the songs "Bílá liga" (White League) and "Čech". Other songs focused on their opposition to Fascism, such as "Faschos". While they sang about drinking beer ("Pivečko"), they were opposed to hard drugs, a sentiment expressed in the song "Perník".

Orlík was criticized for the racial overtones of some of their compositions, targeting specifically the gypsy minority in Czechoslovakia. They denied these accusations and claimed that their music was misunderstood. With their signature shaven heads, they are thought to have popularized the skinhead subculture in Czechoslovakia.

After the band broke up, frontman Daniel Landa went on to have a successful solo career and remains musically active to this day. David Matásek returned to his acting career, launched in 1982.

== Band members ==
- Daniel Landa – vocals (1988–91)
- David Matásek – guitar (1988–91)
- Jakub Maleček – bass (1989–91)
- Jan Limburský – drums (1989–91)
- Adolf Vitáček – drums (1988–89)
- Šimon Budský – bass (1988–89)
- Petr Štěpánek – guitar (1988–89)

== Discography ==
Studio albums

- Oi! (1990)
- Demise (1991)

Compilations

- Rebelie - Punk'n'Oi! (1990)
- Skin's songs vol. 1 (1992)

Demos

- Demo Nulka (1989)
