= Vladimír Javorský =

Czech actor

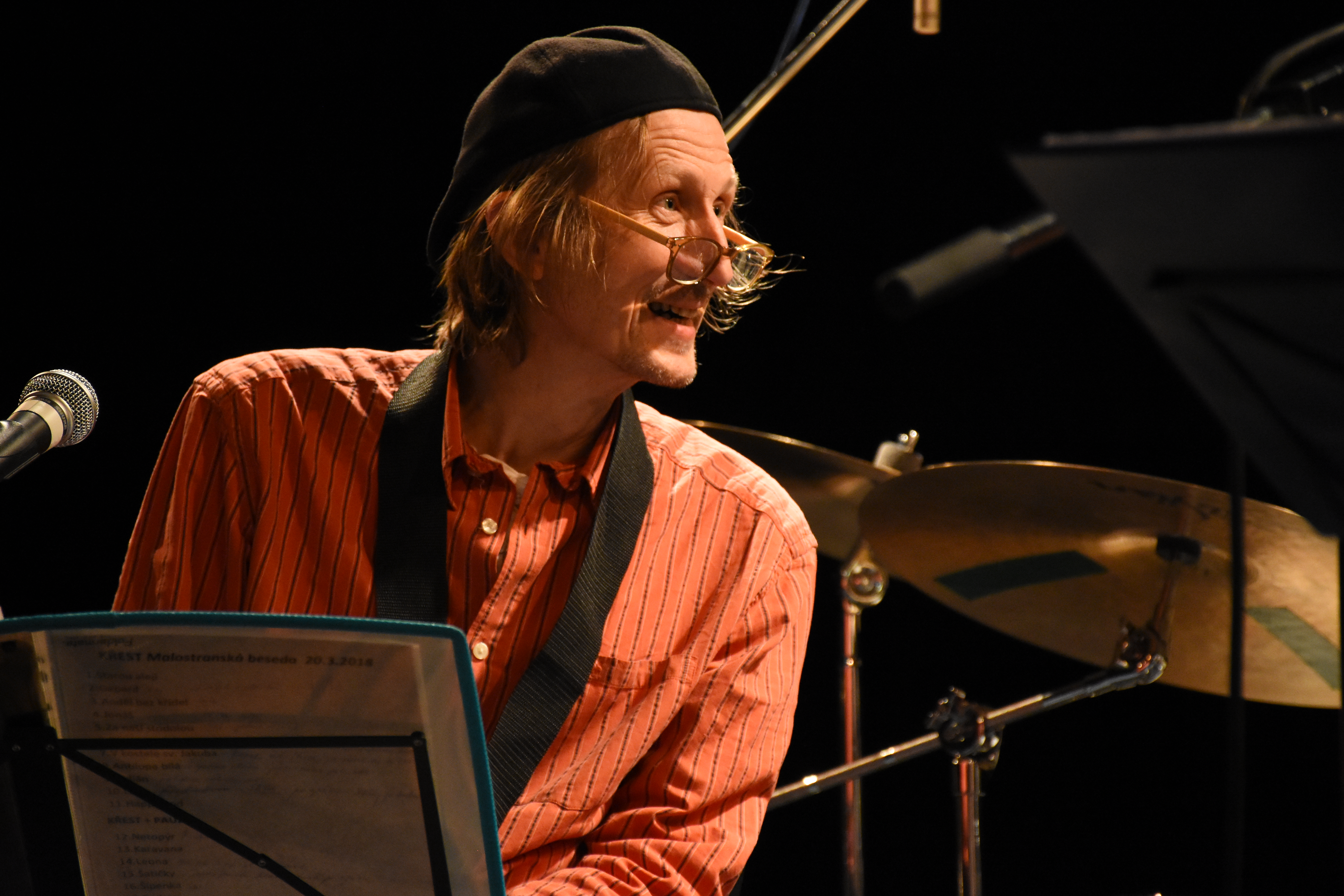
- Vladimír Javorský
- Born: 2 May 1962 (age 63); Ostrava, Czechoslovakia (now Czech Republic)
- Occupation: Actor
- Years active: 1986–present

Vladimír Javorský (born 2 May 1962 in Ostrava) is a Czech actor. He appeared in more than forty films between 1986 and 2011.

== Selected filmography ==
Film
Year	Title	Role	Notes
2011	Flower Buds		
2007	ROMing		
2005	Kousek nebe	Šebek	
2003	Most	bridge operator, father	
1997	Báječná léta pod psa	Šperk	
