= Hoštice-Heroltice =

- Municipality
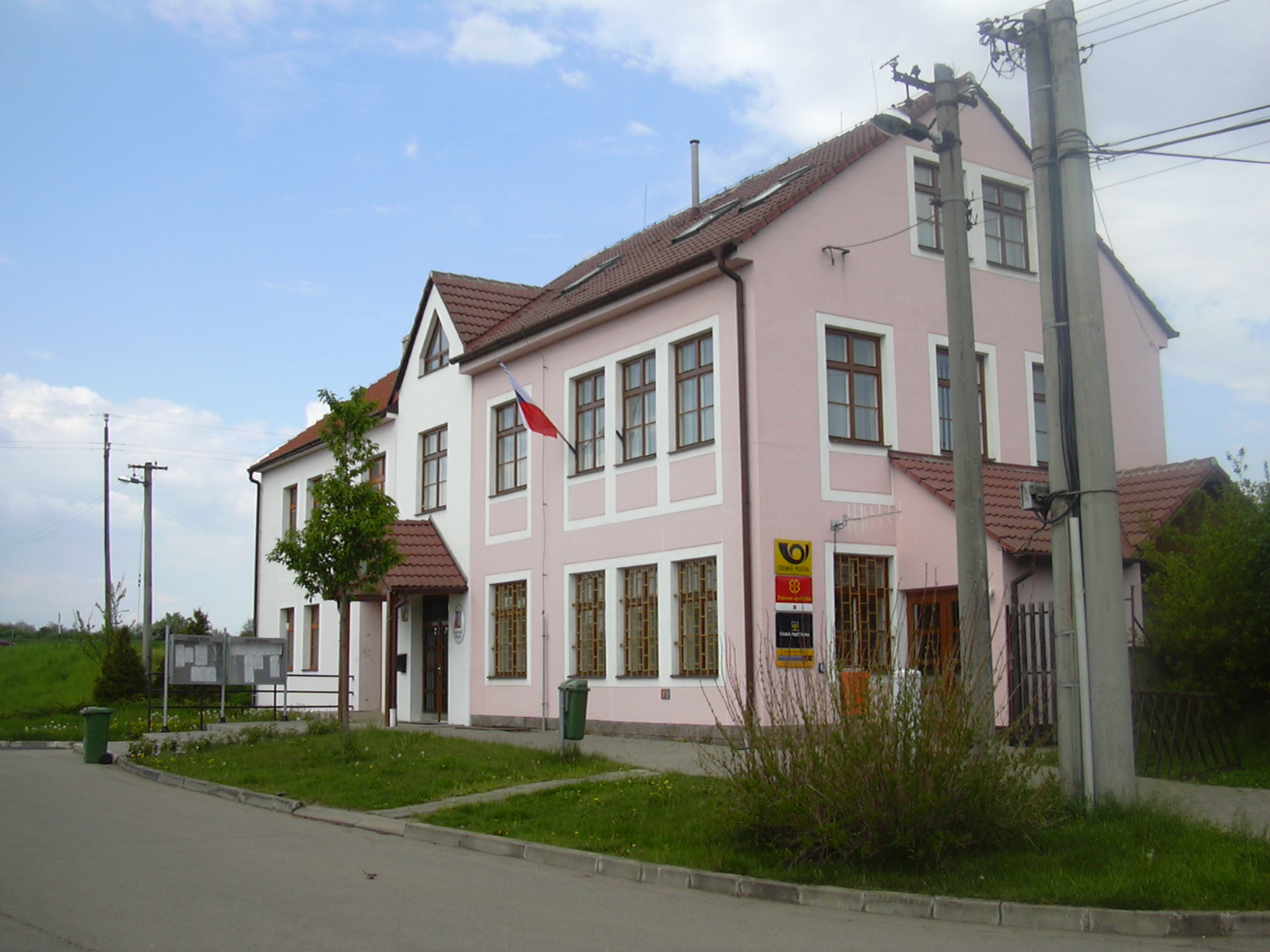
- Municipal office

- Flag Coat of arms

- Location in the Czech Republic
- Coordinates: 49°17′14″N 17°4′0″E
- Country: Czech Republic
- Region: South Moravian
- District: Vyškov
- First mentioned: 1349

Area
  - Total: 7.24 km^{2} (2.80 sq mi)
- Elevation: 230 m (750 ft)

Population (2026-01-01)
  - Total: 617
  - Density: 85.2/km^{2} (221/sq mi)
- Time zone: UTC+1 (CET)
  - Summer (DST): UTC+2 (CEST)
- Postal code: 683 26
- Website: hostice-heroltice.cz

Hoštice-Heroltice is a municipality in Vyškov District in the South Moravian Region of the Czech Republic. It has about 600 inhabitants.

== Administrative division ==
Hoštice-Heroltice consists of two municipal parts (in brackets population according to the 2021 census):

- Hoštice (249)
- Heroltice (370)

== Etymology ==
Both the names Hoštice and Heroltice are derived from the personal names – Hošt and Herolt.

== Geography ==
Hoštice-Heroltice is located about 4 kilometres (2 mi) east of Vyškov and 29 km (18 mi) northeast of Brno. It lies in a flat agricultural landscape of the Vyškov Gate. The municipality is situated on the left bank of the Haná River.

== History ==
The first written mention of Hoštice is from 1445. Heroltice was first mentioned in 1349. Hoštice and Heroltice were merged into one municipality in 1942.

== Demographics ==
Historical population

Year	Pop.	±%
1869	617	—
1880	663	+7.5%
1890	659	−0.6%
1900	724	+9.9%
1910	779	+7.6%

Year	Pop.	±%
1921	738	−5.3%
1930	702	−4.9%
1950	656	−6.6%
1961	653	−0.5%
1970	603	−7.7%

Year	Pop.	±%
1980	557	−7.6%
1991	534	−4.1%
2001	555	+3.9%
2011	546	−1.6%
2021	619	+13.4%

Source: Censuses

== Transport ==
The D1 motorway from Brno to Ostrava runs through the southern part of the municipality.

== Sights ==
The main landmark of the municipality is the Church of Saint John the Baptist in Hoštice. It was built in the late Gothic style in 1445.

== Notable people ==
- Klement Gottwald (1896–1953), politician and President of Czechoslovakia; possible birthplace
- Pavel Zedníček (born 1949), actor
- Milan Petržela (born 1983), footballer
