= David Matásek =

Czech actor and musician (born 1963)

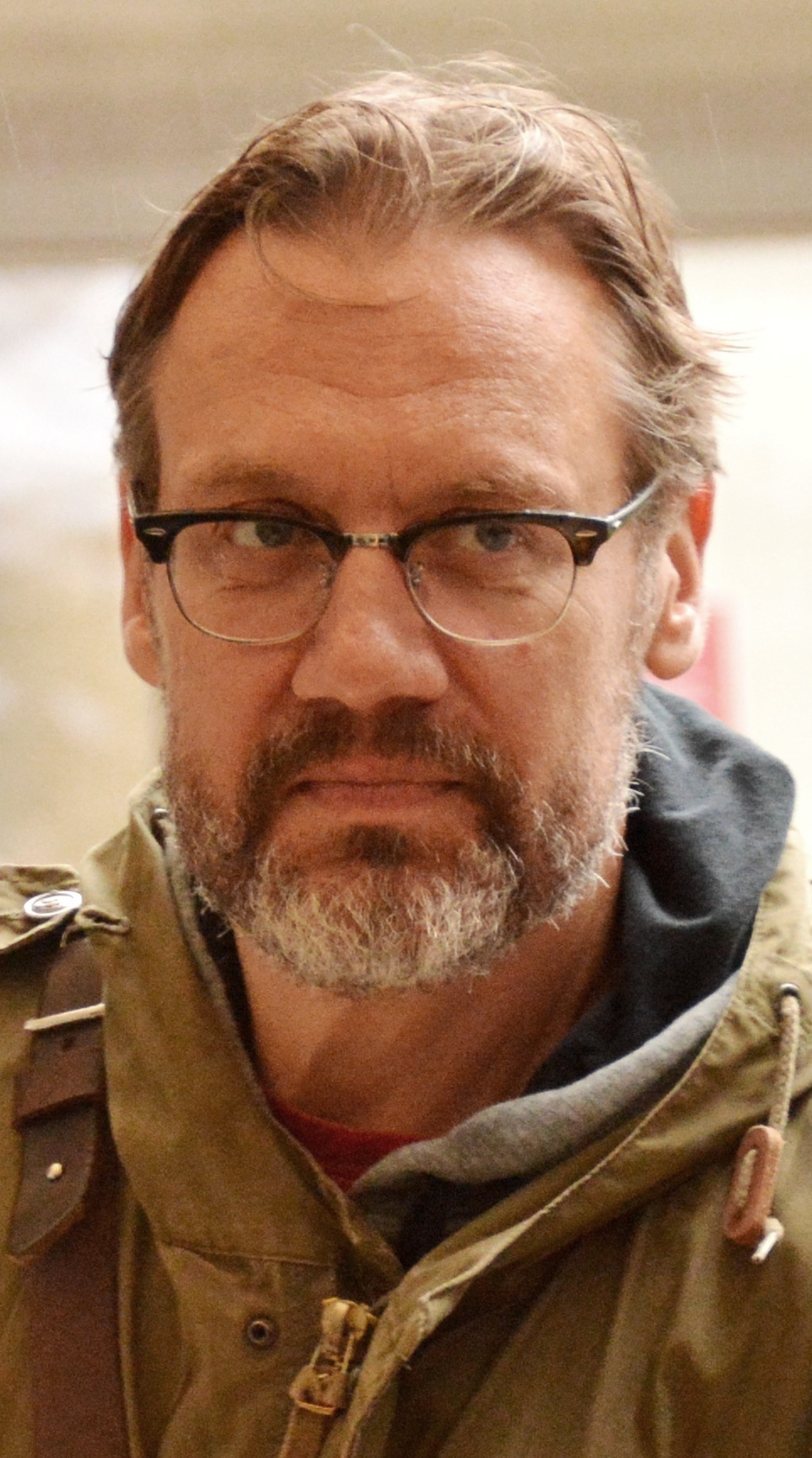
- Matásek in 2017
- Born: 14 February 1963 (age 63); Prague, Czechoslovakia
- Education: Prague Conservatory
- Occupations: Actor, musician
- Years active: 1982–present
- Known for: Poets hexalogy; Orlík
- Spouses: Eva Turnová (div.); Eva Matásková

David Matásek (born 14 February 1963) is a Czech actor and musician. He is known for being a stable cast member of the "Poets hexalogy", which includes the 1982 film How the World Is Losing Poets, and as the guitarist in the early 1990s punk bands Orlík and Hagen Baden.

== Biography ==
=== Early life ===
David Matásek was born in Prague in 1963. His father, Petr Matásek, was a theatre set designer, and his mother, Jana Matásková, was a graphic designer. Matásek attended the Prague Conservatory, graduating in 1984.

=== Acting ===
Matásek's first film appearance was a supporting role in Dušan Klein's How the World Is Losing Poets (1982). He would go on to reprise the character in the latter five parts of the so-called "Poets hexalogy".

Between 1991 and 1995, he was engaged at Prague's National Theatre, and he subsequently worked at Divadlo Komedie. Since 2002, the actor has been a member of the National Theatre again.

=== Music ===
In 1988, Matásek, who plays guitar, co-founded the oi! punk group Orlík, together with Daniel Landa. The band released two studio albums and broke up in 1991. Matásek later played in Lou Fanánek Hagen's punk band Hagen Baden, until their breakup in 1993.

=== Personal life ===
Matásek's first wife was fellow musician Eva Turnová, who formerly played bass with The Plastic People of the Universe. His second wife, Simona, with whom he has one daughter, is a journalist and playwright. The actor also has a daughter and a son with his third wife, Kateřina. He is currently married, for the fourth time, to fashion blogger Eva Matásková, with whom he has one son.

Between 2012 and 2014, Matásek, along with ninety other people, was criminally prosecuted for alleged bribery in a driving license scam.

== Discography ==
=== with Orlík ===
- Oi! (1990)
- Demise (1991)

=== with Hagen Baden ===
- Hagen Baden (1992)
- Ahoj kluci (1993)

== Selected filmography ==
=== Film ===
List of film appearances, with year, title, and role shown
Year	Title	Role	Notes
1982	How the World Is Losing Poets	Kendy	
1985	How Poets Are Losing Their Illusions	Kendy	
1988	How Poets Are Enjoying Their Lives	Kendy	
1993	Konec básníků v Čechách	Kendy	
2000	Loners	Radio owner	
2003	One Hand Can't Clap	Jan	
2004	Jak básníci neztrácejí naději	Kendy	
2014	Three Brothers	King	
2016	How Poets Wait for a Miracle	Kendy	

=== Television ===
List of television appearances, with year, title, and role shown
Year	Title	Role	Notes
1985	Rozpaky kuchaře Svatopluka	Waiter Ferda	4 episodes
1986	Bylo nás šest	Honza Špaček	6 episodes
1989	Fabrik der Offiziere	Fähnrich Andreas	4 episodes (miniseries)
1996	Hospoda	Assistant magazine editor	1 episode
1998	Three Kings	Frajer	1 episode
2001	Zdivočelá země	Dlouhý	2 episodes
2001	Četnické humoresky	Buzek	1 episode
2004–05	Redakce	Viktor Seidl	39 episodes
2005	Ulice	Viktor Seidl	1 episode
2006–07	Letiště	Karel Halama	74 episodes
2009–10	Přešlapy	David Mareš	39 episodes
2012	Obchoďák	Ivan Marák	32 episodes
2013	PanMáma	Michal Kabeš	4 episodes
2015	Znamení koně	Ivan Loukota	11 episodes
2016–21	Polda	Michal Bříza	48 episodes
