= How Poets Are Losing Their Illusions =

1985 Czechoslovak comedy film

- Czech: Jak básníci přicházejí o iluze
- Directed by: Dušan Klein
- Written by: Dušan Klein; Ladislav Pecháček
- Starring: Pavel Kříž; David Matásek
- Cinematography: Josef Vaniš
- Edited by: Jiří Brožek
- Music by: Zdeněk Marat
- Release date: 1 April 1985
- Running time: 98 minutes
- Country: Czechoslovakia
- Language: Czech

How Poets Are Losing Their Illusions (Czech: Jak básníci přicházejí o iluze) is a 1985 Czechoslovak comedy film directed by Dušan Klein and written by Klein, together with Ladislav Pecháček. The second in the "Poets hexalogy", the title is preceded by How the World Is Losing Poets (1982) and followed by How Poets Are Enjoying Their Lives (1988), Konec básníků v Čechách (1993), Jak básníci neztrácejí naději (2004), and Jak básníci čekají na zázrak (2016). The film stars Pavel Kříž and David Matásek, and focuses on the young poet Štěpán Šafránek as he studies to become a doctor in Prague.

== Synopsis ==
Friends and former small-town classmates Štěpán and Kendy are both studying in Prague—Štěpán is taking medicine at Charles University, while Kendy studies directing at FAMU. Kendy's studies are going well, but Štěpán struggles, both with course load and with finances. Kendy advises his friend to make connections with a rich family by meeting their eighteen-year-old daughter, Saša, who, though not quite attractive, longs for a boyfriend. Štěpán's attempt at courtship ends in disaster, however. He subsequently meets a beautiful medical student nicknamed "the cave", who is also romantically pursued by the unpleasant Dr. Fast. Štěpán attempts to impress her by acing his studies, but in the end, his quest ends in disappointment.

== Cast and characters ==
- Pavel Kříž as Štepán Šafránek
- David Matásek as Kendy
- Míla Myslíková as Šafránková
- Adriana Tarábková as "the cave"
- Karel Roden as Honza Antoš
- Eva Jeníčková as Vendulka "Utěšitelka"
- Joseph Dielle as Numira "Mireček"
- Václav Svoboda as Venoš Pastyřík
- František Filipovský as Adolf Valerián
- Zdeněk Svěrák as Dr. Zajíc
- Jiří Štěpnička as Dr. Fast
- Lucie Juricková as Saša
- Jan Přeučil as Dr. Sejkora
- Josef Somr as Prof. Ječmen
- Michaela Dolinová as Eva
- Adolf Filip as Kendy's dad (uncredited)
- Ondřej Vetchý as Karabec (uncredited)
