= Vážení přátelé, ano =

Vážení přátelé, ano is a Czech comedy film. It was released in 1989.
