= Tomáš Töpfer =

Czech actor

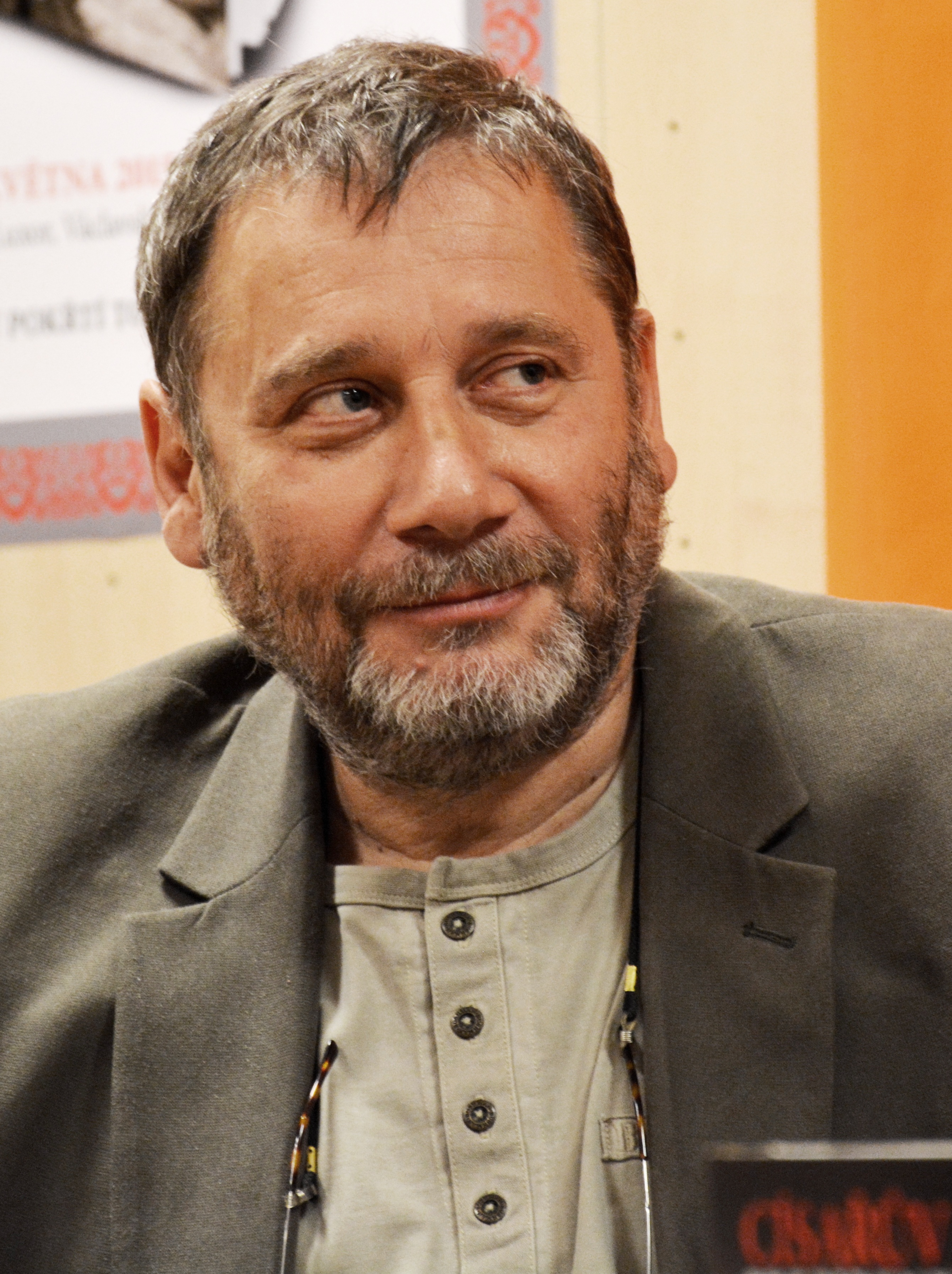
- Töpfer in 2015
- Born: 10 January 1951 (age 74); Prague, Czechoslovakia
- Occupation: Actor
- Years active: 1971-present

Tomáš Töpfer (born 10 January 1951) is a Czech film and television actor and politician. He was named Best Actor at the 1995 Alfréd Radok Awards. At the 2006 Thalia Awards he won the category of Best Actor in an Operetta or Musical.

== Selected filmography ==
- How Poets Are Enjoying Their Lives (1987)
- Konec básníků v Čechách (1993)
- Život na zámku (1995,1998)
- Četnické humoresky (television, 1997)
- Jak básníci neztrácejí naději (2004)
- The Sorrow of Mrs. Schneider (2008)
- Czech Peace (2010)
- My Uncle Archimedes (2018)
- Rašín (2018)
