= Incomplete Eclipse =

1982 Czech drama film

- Directed by: Jaromil Jireš
- Written by: Daniela Fischerová; Jaromil Jireš
- Starring: Lucie Pátiková
- Cinematography: Emil Sirotek
- Release date: 1982
- Running time: 82 minutes
- Country: Czechoslovakia
- Language: Czech

Incomplete Eclipse (Czech: Neúplné zatmení) is a 1982 Czech drama film directed by Jaromil Jireš. It was entered into the 33rd Berlin International Film Festival. The film was also selected as the Czechoslovak entry for the Best Foreign Language Film at the 56th Academy Awards, but was not accepted as a nominee.

== Cast ==
- Lucie Pátiková as Marta
- Oldřich Navrátil as Doktor Mos
- Blanka Bohdanová as Nurse
- Jana Brezinová as Mother
- Gabriela Bestáková as Marta's Sister
- Simona Stašová
- Ludmila Vostrcilová

== See also ==
- List of submissions to the 56th Academy Awards for Best Foreign Language Film
- List of Czechoslovak submissions for the Academy Award for Best Foreign Language Film
