= How the World Is Losing Poets =

1982 Czechoslovak comedy film

- Czech: Jak svět přichází o básníky
- Directed by: Dušan Klein
- Written by: Dušan Klein; Ladislav Pecháček
- Screenplay by: Dušan Klein
- Based on: Amatéři. Jak přichází svět o básníky by Ladislav Pecháček
- Produced by: Eliška Nejedlá
- Starring: Pavel Kříž; David Matásek; Miroslava Šafránková
- Cinematography: Emil Sirotek
- Edited by: Jiří Brožek
- Music by: Zdeněk Marat
- Production company: Barrandov Studios
- Release date: 1 November 1982
- Running time: 90 minutes
- Country: Czechoslovakia
- Language: Czech

How the World Is Losing Poets (Czech: Jak svět přichází o básníky) is a Czechoslovak comedy film directed by Dušan Klein, based on the novella Amatéři. Jak přichází svět o básníky by Ladislav Pecháček. It was released in 1982. The first of the "Poets hexalogy", the title is followed by How Poets Are Losing Their Illusions (1985), How Poets Are Enjoying Their Lives (1988), Konec básníků v Čechách (1993), Jak básníci neztrácejí naději (2004), and Jak básníci čekají na zázrak (2016). The film stars Pavel Kříž, David Matásek, and Miroslava Šafránková.

== Synopsis ==
Štepán Šafránek, a high school student with poetic talent, and his friend Kendy, a musician, agree to write and perform a musical play. They rope in various residents of their small town, including Borůvka, a young girl to whom Šafránek ultimately loses his virginity.

== Cast and characters ==
- Pavel Kříž as Štepán Šafránek
- David Matásek as Kendy
- Miroslava Šafránková as Borůvka
- František Filipovský as Valerián
- Josef Somr as Prof. Ječmen
- Oldřich Navrátil as Emil Nádeníček
- Jiří Císler as Čermáček
- Lenka Kořínková as Vránová / wood nymph
- František Ringo Čech as Bouchal
- Míla Myslíková as Šafránková
- Adolf Filip as Kendy's dad
- Lubomír Kostelka as Šindel
- Luděk Kopřiva as Hugo
- Miroslava Hozová as Ječmenová
- Zdena Hadrbolcová as Professor
- Jiří Kodet as Pergl
- Barbora Štepánová as Štepánka Hrdličková
- Jiřina Jirásková as School principal
- Zdeněk Srstka as Bartender (uncredited)
