= Nová Ves pod Pleší =

- Municipality
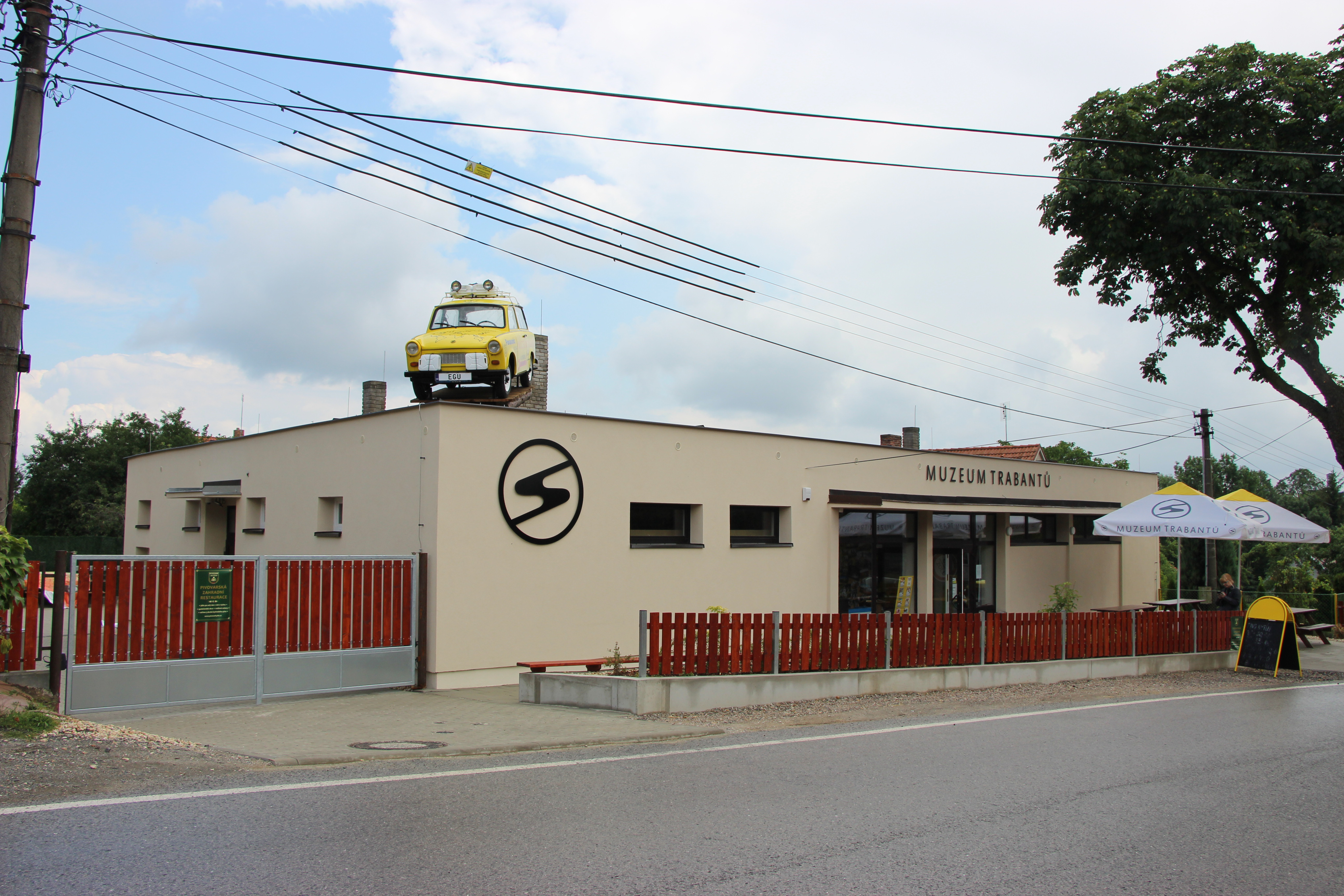
- Trabant Museum

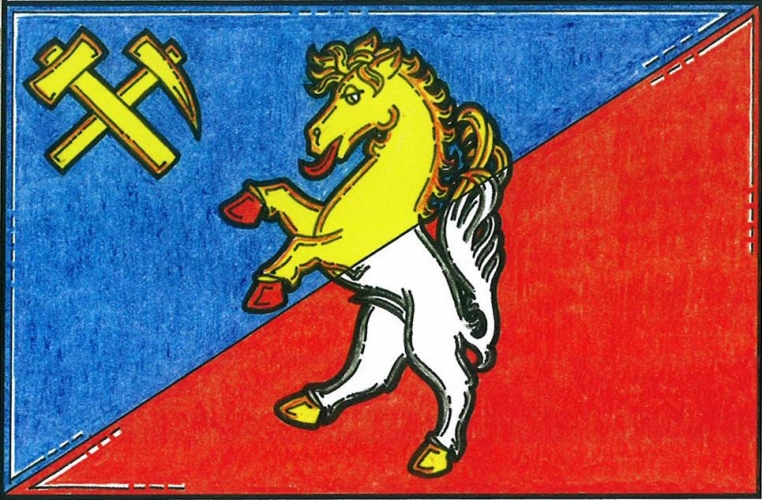
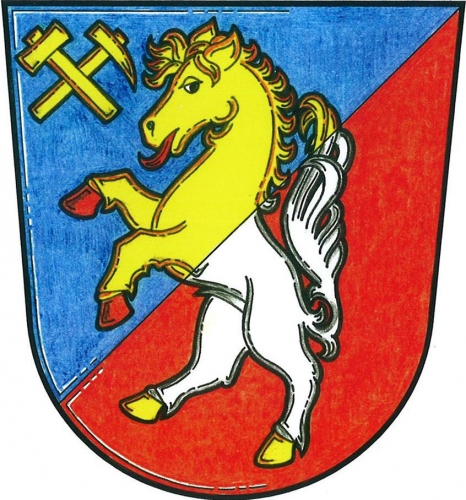
- Flag Coat of arms

- Location in the Czech Republic
- Coordinates: 49°49′55″N 14°16′31″E
- Country: Czech Republic
- Region: Central Bohemian
- District: Příbram
- First mentioned: 1304

Area
  - Total: 11.03 km^{2} (4.26 sq mi)
- Elevation: 410 m (1,350 ft)

Population (2026-01-01)
  - Total: 1,604
  - Density: 145.4/km^{2} (376.6/sq mi)
- Time zone: UTC+1 (CET)
  - Summer (DST): UTC+2 (CEST)
- Postal code: 262 04
- Website: www.novavespodplesi.cz

Nová Ves pod Pleší is a municipality and village in Příbram District in the Central Bohemian Region of the Czech Republic. It has about 1,600 inhabitants.

== Etymology ==
The name means 'new village under Pleš' in Czech, referring to its location near the Pleš hill.

== Geography ==
Nová Ves pod Pleší is located about 25 kilometres (16 mi) northeast of Příbram and 25 km (16 mi) southwest of Prague. It lies in the Benešov Uplands. The highest point is the Pleš hill at 490 m (1,610 ft) above sea level.

== History ==
The first written mention of Nová Ves pod Pleší is from 1304. The village was a part of the Dobříš estate and shared its owners. In the Middle Ages, gold was mined in the area of the village.

== Demographics ==
Historical population

Year	Pop.	±%
1869	563	—
1880	515	−8.5%
1890	517	+0.4%
1900	534	+3.3%
1910	527	−1.3%

Year	Pop.	±%
1921	654	+24.1%
1930	945	+44.5%
1950	855	−9.5%
1961	651	−23.9%
1970	652	+0.2%

Year	Pop.	±%
1980	652	+0.0%
1991	667	+2.3%
2001	731	+9.6%
2011	984	+34.6%
2021	1,566	+59.1%

Source: Censuses

== Economy ==
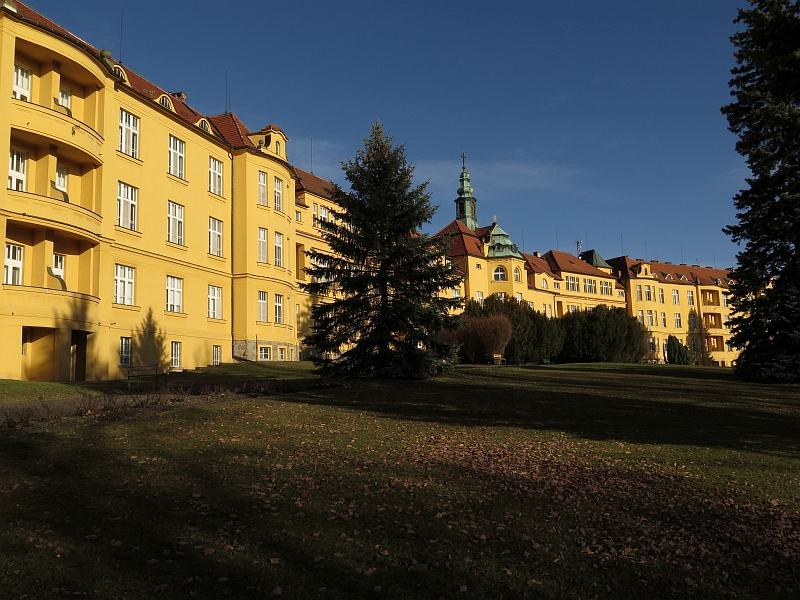
Main building of the hospital

Nová Ves pod Pleší is known for a hospital focused on oncology and rehabilitation. It was originally a sanatorium for the treatment of tuberculosis, founded in 1916. Oncological treatment was started in 1982. After the transformation in 2007, it is a branch of the Příbram Hospital.

== Transport ==
The D4 motorway from Prague to Písek runs along the western municipal border.

Nová Ves pod Pleší is located on the railway line Prague–Dobříš.

== Sights ==
Nová Ves pod Pleší is poor in historical monuments. The most valuable building is the main building of the hospital. It was built in the neo-Baroque style 1912–1916. The façade is decorated with Art Nouveau elements. Other buildings in the hospital area were modernised and lost their architectural value.

In the municipality is the Trabant Museum, dedicated to the Trabant car brand and the travels of documentarian and traveller Dan Přibáň.
