= Žednik =

Žednik may refer to the following places in the city of Subotica, North Bačka District, Vojvodina, Serbia:

- Novi Žednik
- Stari Žednik
