= Dušan Klein =

Czech film director (1939–2022)

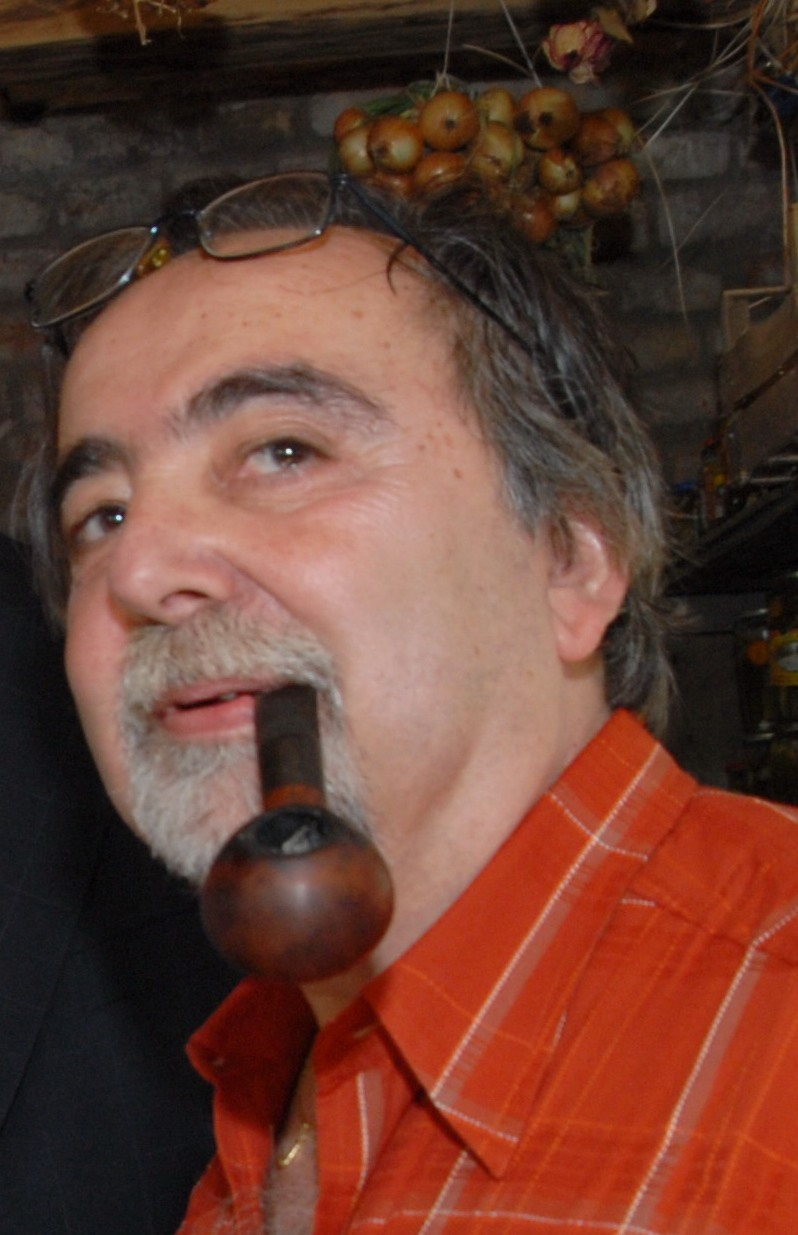
- Dušan Klein in 2007
- Born: Július Klein; 27 June 1939; Michalovce, Czechoslovakia
- Died: 9 January 2022 (aged 82); Prague, Czech Republic
- Education: Academy of Performing Arts in Prague
- Occupations: Film director, screenwriter
- Years active: 1963–2022

Dušan Klein (born Július Klein; 27 June 1939 – 9 January 2022) was a Czech film director and screenwriter of Slovak-Jewish origin. His most notable work is the comedic hexalogy "Poets". From 1990 to 2002, he was a university teacher.

== Biography ==
Dušan Klein was born Július Klein on 27 June 1939 in Michalovce in the Slovak part of Czechoslovakia. He was from a Jewish family and had two older brothers. During the war, he hid in a monastery for orphans and was given the code name Dušan Ružiak. He kept the first name Dušan and adopted it as his own. After revealing their hiding place in December 1944, he and his brothers were sent to the Theresienstadt Ghetto, but thanks to the end of World War II, they were not deported to extermination.

The house of Dušan's family burned down during the war, so the family moved to Bratislava after the war. In 1952, they moved to Ostrava. In the 1950s, Klein performed in amateur theatre. He had his first experiences with film as an actor in a small roles in Lazy sa pohli (1952) and Rodná zem (1953), then he played the lead role in Můj přítel Fabián (1953, directed by Jiří Weiss). In 1958–1963, he studied film directory at the Film and TV School of the Academy of Performing Arts in Prague (FAMU). During his studies, he began working as an assistant director at the Barrandov Studios.

After graduating from university, Klein wanted to make tragicomedies, but due to the situation in society after the invasion of Czechoslovakia, he wanted to avoid social issues, so he made crime films. His films at that time were characterized by a desire for story credibility and deeper psychological motivation. From 1975 to 1991, he was a film director in the Barrandov Studios. He also participated as a screenwriter in most of his films. In 1982 he made his first comedy film, How the World Is Losing Poets. He thus launched the "Poets" hexalogy, which became his most successful work. The first three films from the hexalogy, released in 1982, 1984 and 1987, attracted over five million viewers to Czechoslovak cinemas and ranked among the most commercially successful films of Czechoslovak cinematography.

A characteristic feature of Klein's presentation was a tobacco pipe. He worked as a pedagogue at his alma mater FAMU from 1990 to 2002. With his wife Silvera, Klein had two sons. He died after a long illness in a Prague hospital on 9 January 2022, at the age of 82.

== Selected filmography ==
- How the World Is Losing Poets (1982)
- How Poets Are Losing Their Illusions (1984)
- How Poets Are Enjoying Their Lives (1987)
- Dobří holubi se vracejí (1988)
- Vážení přátelé, ano (1989)
- Konec básníků v Čechách (1993)
- Jak básníci neztrácejí naději (2004)
- Strážce duší (TV series; 2005–2009)
- How Poets Wait for a Miracle (2016)
