= Život na zámku =

- Genre: Drama
- Directed by: Jaroslav Hanuš
- Starring: Tomáš Töpfer, Kateřina Macháčková, Kateřina Hrachovcová, Jiřina Jirásková
- Country of origin: Czech Republic
- Original language: Czech
- No. of seasons: 2
- No. of episodes: 52

Production
- Running time: 48 minutes

Original release
- Network: Czech Television
- Release: December 11, 1995 – January 3, 2000

Život na zámku (English: Life at the Mansion) is a Czech television series from 1995. It was filmed from spring 1994 to October 1998 in Kolín and at Roztěž Castle. The series had audience share 34.4% and was in its time one of the most watched Czech series.

== Plot ==
In a small town, the Královy family lives in one apartment - grandmother, father and dentist Přemysl Král, his wife, a grammar school teacher, Marie and their teenage children, daughter Simona and son Otakar. At first, she primarily deals with a complicated housing situation, her grandmother moves in with her neighbor Vaňka, but she soon returns. Otakar is studying medicine, but he turns down an offer to study abroad because of his girlfriend. Otakar quarrels with his parents about this, leaves, interrupts school and has to join the army.

Grandmother and her son Přemysl inherit the castle Temniště, which is located near their town, according to Count Esperek's will. Grandma worked as Count Esperka's cook, and Přemysl Král is his illegitimate son. Přemysl Král has to move out of his practice because the owner's son, also a dentist, claims it. The Královy family moves to Temniště. They want to solve the financial shortage by renting part of the property to some lucrative client, so they refuse the local kindergarten. Before signing the lease agreement with the gallery, it is discovered that the castle does not belong to the Královys. The king meets with the former lover of the primary Bohata, Renáta. The Královs divorce, Marie leaves the gymnasium and moves to her parents in the village. Simona studies journalism and works in Regional papers, during a driving school course she becomes pregnant by a married instructor who told her that he is divorced. Her daughter Marenka is born.

The castle returns to the ownership of the Kings. Marie with her daughter Simona and granddaughter Mařenka get an apartment from Mr. Vaňek. Marie returns to school and becomes close to the former headmaster and competitor Mára. At the end of the 26th episode, she meets her drunken ex-husband Přemysl and returns to him. This part ended the first part of the filming, other parts were filmed from 1997.

Count Esperk's son, Felix, who lives in Switzerland, challenges the Kings' right to inheritance and contests the will. The court assigns the property to Felix. Otakar Král has secretly married and informs his parents that he will remain in the army. Marie and Přemysl get married again and start building a house for the whole family. The king becomes a doctor in the hospital. After the approval, only the Královs remain in the house, later son Otakar moves in with his wife and son Otakar. Simona marries Tonda Nové and after the vicissitudes they fly to England. Marie gets an offer to leave for the Ministry of Education. In the last episode, Grandma marries her former neighbor Vanek.

== Cast ==
- Tomáš Töpfer as Přemysl Král
- Kateřina Macháčková as Marie Králová
- Kateřina Hrachovcová as Simona Králová
- Jiřina Jirásková as grandma Králová
- Petr Rajchert as Otakar Král
- Bronislav Poloczek as Pešák
- Jaroslava Obermaierová as nurse Karla
- Lenka Termerová as Pavla Nováková
- Václav Vydra as Vojta Mráz
- Stella Zázvorková as Andulka Šafářová
- Jaroslav Moučka as Mráz
- Vlastimil Brodský as Vaněk
- Jan Čenský as MUDr. Bohata
- Eliška Kasanová as Běta Mrázová
- Dominika Kovarovičová as Mařenka
- Kateřina Brožová as Renáta
- Jan Šťastný as Tonda Nový
- Pavel Soukup as Karel Mára

== Episodes ==
1. Rodiče a děti
2. Stěhování
3. Vyhazov
4. Sto padesát metrů čtverečních
5. Podraz
6. Konkurs
7. Klíční kost
8. Facka
9. Návrat ztraceného syna
10. Operace
11. Závěť
12. Čtyřicet plus jedna
13. Školka
14. Trestní oznámení
15. U konce s dechem
16. Ředitelka
17. Havárie
18. Výpověď
19. Svedený an opuštěný
20. Ukazatel směru
21. Neposkvrněné početí
22. Přemysl Otakar II.
23. Host do domu
24. Kdo s koho
25. Konečně začátek
26. Brácha
27. Soud
28. Školník
29. Náledí
30. Svatba
31. Tvrdé hlavy
32. Nástup
33. Zánět
34. Proti všem
35. Tchýně
36. Období dešťů
37. Primář
38. Kolaudace
39. Podnikatel
40. Zkouška
41. Konec legrace
42. Půlnoční kovboj
43. Mouchy
44. Sádra
45. Všechno je jinak
46. Rozchod
47. Deštník
48. Nebezpečné chvíle
49. Nejasné příznaky
50. Konečná diagnóza
51. Veselka

== Awards ==
The series finished second in the TýTý survey, in the category Show of the Year, the series was ranked 2nd in 1997 and 1st in 1999.

== Books ==
- Jan Míka: Život na zámku: podle stejnojmenného televizního seriálu. Praha: Iris: Knižní klub, 1996
- Jan Míka: Život na zámku: podle stejnojmenného televizního seriálu: pokračování. Praha: Iris: Knižní klub, 1997
- Jan Míka: Život na zámku : podle stejnojmenného televizního seriálu : dokončení, happy end. Praha: Iris: Knižní klub, 1999
- Jan Míka: Život na zámku (2. vydání, kompletní). Praha : XYZ, 2005.
