= Míla Myslíková =

Czech actress (1933–2005)

- Born: 14 February 1933; Třebíč, Czechoslovakia
- Died: 11 February 2005 (aged 71); Prague, Czech Republic
- Occupation: Actress
- Years active: 1954-1993

Bohumila "Míla" Myslíková (14 February 1933 – 11 February 2005) was a Czech actress. She appeared in over 90 films and television shows from 1954 till 1993. She starred in the 1974 film Kdo hledá zlaté dno, which was entered into the 25th Berlin International Film Festival.

== Selected filmography ==
- The Day the Tree Blooms (1961)
- Hvězda zvaná Pelyněk (1964)
- Capricious Summer (1968)
- The Cremator (1969)
- Tři oříšky pro Popelku (1973)
- Who Looks for Gold? (1974)
- How to Drown Dr. Mracek, the Lawyer (1974)
- How the World Is Losing Poets (1982)
- Jára Cimrman Lying, Sleeping (1983)
- How Poets Are Losing Their Illusions (1985)
- How Poets Are Enjoying Their Lives (1988)
