= Give the Devil His Due =

1985 Czech fairy tale film

- 1986 poster
- Directed by: Hynek Bočan
- Written by: Jiří Just; Hynek Bočan
- Based on: Čertův švagr by Božena Němcová
- Starring: Ondřej Vetchý; Josef Kemr; Vladimír Dlouhý; Petr Nárožný
- Cinematography: Jaromír Šofr
- Edited by: Dalibor Lipský
- Music by: Jaroslav Uhlíř; Zdeněk Svěrák
- Production company: Barrandov Studios
- Distributed by: Ústřední půjčovna filmů
- Release date: 1 October 1985
- Running time: 90 minutes
- Country: Czechoslovakia
- Language: Czech
- Budget: 9 million CSK

Give the Devil His Due (Czech: S čerty nejsou žerty) is a 1985 Czech fairytale film directed by Hynek Bočan. It is one of the most popular fairytale films in the Czech Republic. The original Czech title means "No joking around with devils".

== Plot ==
Petr's father marries Dorota and dies soon afterwards. Dorota wants to get rid of Petr and uses her courtship to the Governor who has Petr arrested. Petr meets Count's daughters Angelína and Adélka during his escape attempt and falls in love with Angelína. Angelína is not interested in poor Petr while Adélka falls in love with him and tries to help him. Petr is forced to join the army where he is bullied by the Corporal. Meanwhile an inexperienced chort Janek is sent to take Dorota to Hell. He accidentally takes Petr's grandmother. Lucipher is angry at Janek and sends him to correct his mistake. Janek accidentally joins the army and loses his supernatural powers when soldiers burn his wolf's tail. He meets Petr and befriends him. Petr decides to help Janek to get his powers back. He manages to get him a new Wolf's tail. They escape army and abduct Dorota and drag her to Hell.

Petr works in Hell and Lucipher eventually decides to release him and fulfill him three wishes. Petr's wishes are: a magic coat that produces golden ducats, a release of his grandmother and permission to take the Corporal to Hell. Lucipher agrees but also wants Janek to take the Governor along with the Corporal. The coat changes Petr's appearance and he gets attention when he gives money to all people who need. This helps him to lure the Governor and the Corporal to Janek who takes them to Hell.

The Count also decides to go ask for the money as his principality is broke. Petr agrees but only if the Count allows him to marry his daughter. Count agrees with the deal but Angelína does not like it as Petr looks like a beggar but Adélka recognises Petr and happily agrees. Petr then takes as many ducats as he needs, takes down the coat and it disappears. He goes to Duke's castle as an elegant gentleman to ask for his daughter's hand. When Angelina sees him she changes her mind and wants to marry him but Petr declines and states that he asked for Adélka's hand. Petr then marries Adélka and Angelína unknowingly marries Lucipher.

== Cast ==
- Ondřej Vetchý as Janek Vraník, a chort
- Vladimír Dlouhý as Petr Máchal
- Josef Kemr as Duke Josef Sličný
- Dana Bartůňková as Angelína
- Monika Pelcová as Adélka
- Petr Nárožný as Corporal
- Jana Dítětová as Anna Máchalová, Petr's grandmother
- Viktor Preiss as Governor
- Jaroslava Kretschmerová as Dorota Máchalová
- Karel Heřmánek as Lucipher

== Production ==
The film is loosely based on Čertův švagr by Božena Němcová. Some aspects were inspired by Fanfan la Tulipe. Writing took place in a group of Marcela Pittermannová. Filming took place in caves near Česká Lípa, in Průhonice, in village Střehom, at Sloup Castle and Kost Castle.

== Reception ==
Give the Devil His Due is considered one of the best Czech fairy tale films ever made. Users of Kinobox server gave the film 87% rating. It is the highest rated fairy tale film on the server. The film has also won many awards including the main award at Chicago International Children's Film Festival.
