= Jaroslav Uhlíř =

Czech composer and pianist (born 1945)

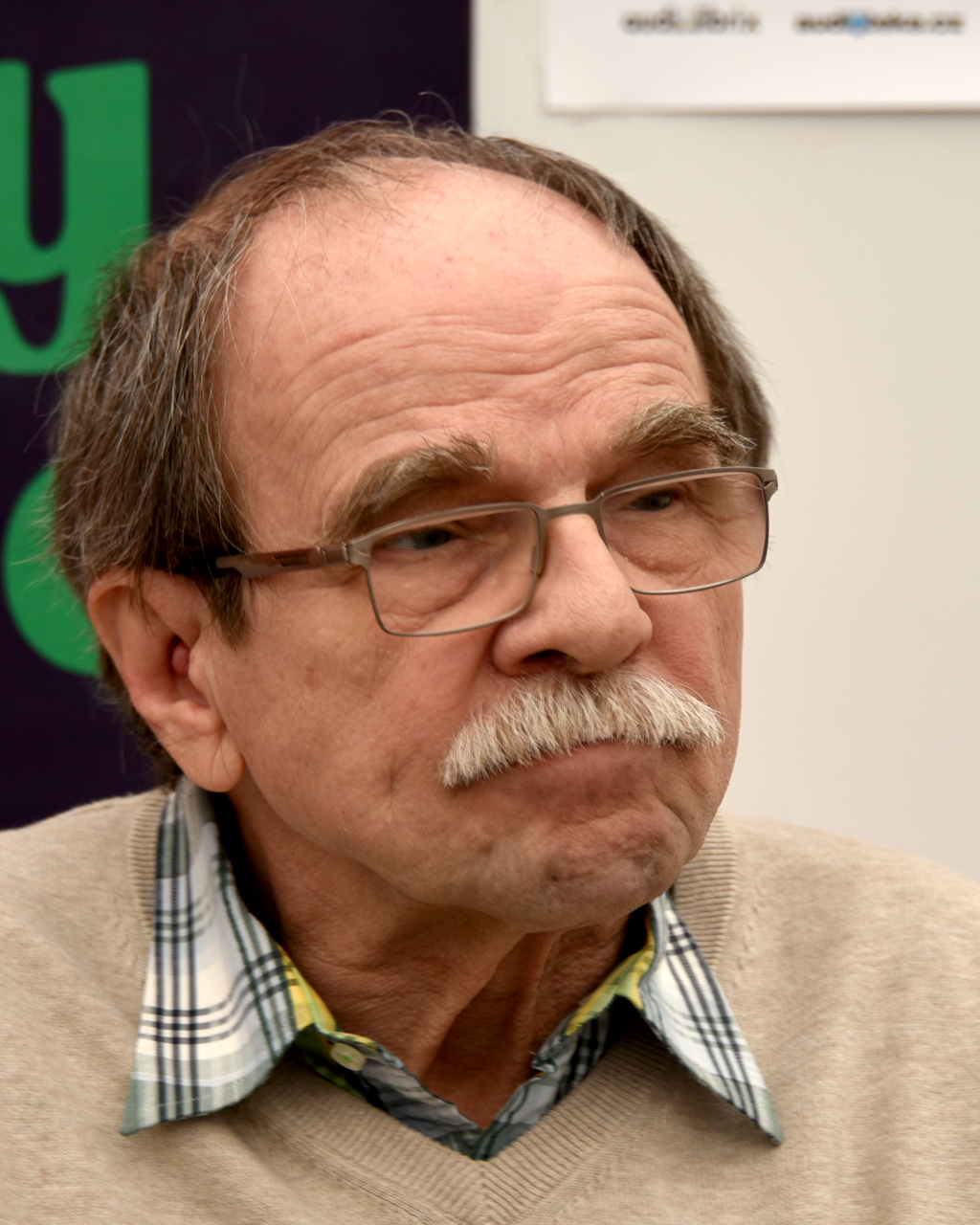
- Uhlíř in 2019

Background information
- Born: 14 September 1945 (age 80); Prague, Czechoslovakia
- Occupations: Musician; composer; singer
- Instruments: Piano; vocals
- Formerly of: Providence; Faraon; Triky a pověry
- Spouses: Zoja Uhlířová (m. 1984–2009) Helena Uhlířová-Chladová (m. 2012)
- Website: www.jaroslavuhlir.cz

Jaroslav Uhlíř (born 14 September 1945) is a Czech composer, pianist and singer. He is known primarily for composing children's songs and music for film. During his career, he collaborated extensively with actor and writer Zdeněk Svěrák, who wrote the lyrics for most of his songs. He has also been a TV host.

== Life and career ==
Jaroslav Uhlíř was born on 14 September 1945 in Prague, Czechoslovakia. He loved music since childhood and graduated from the conservatory. He took a liking to composing simple songs that were catchy, rather than playing complicated compositions.

In the early 1970s, he was a member of the rock bands Providence and Faraon, together with bassist Karel Šíp. Later, he composed music for Czechoslovak National Radio, where he met Zdeněk Svěrák. With him, Uhlíř released many albums of children's music. He also hosted the television show Hitšaráda and later Galašaráda, where he collaborated with Šíp. In the 1980s, Uhlíř formed the parody group Triky a pověry with Šíp and Petra Janů. Between 1988 and 2017, Uhlíř worked with Svěrák on the children's music television show Hodina zpěvu, which spawned a number of operettas, such as O Budulínkovi and O dvanácti měsíčkách. Three of these became the basis of the 2014 Jan Svěrák film Three Brothers.

Uhlíř has composed music for the films Long Live Ghosts! (1977), Waiter, Scarper! (1981), Give the Devil His Due (1985), Lotrando a Zubejda (1997), and Jak básníci neztrácejí naději (2004), among others.

== Selected discography ==
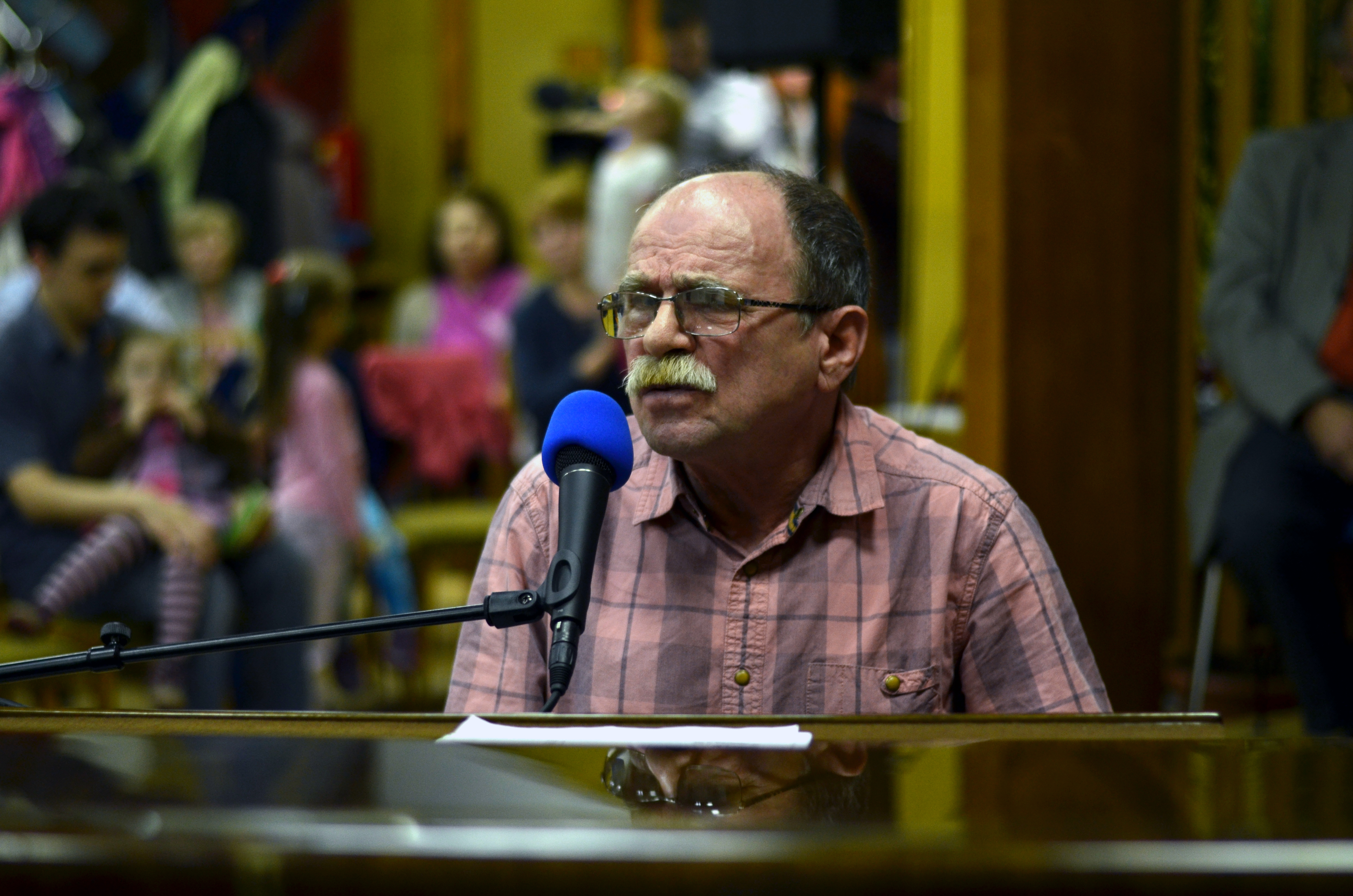
Uhlíř performing in 2015

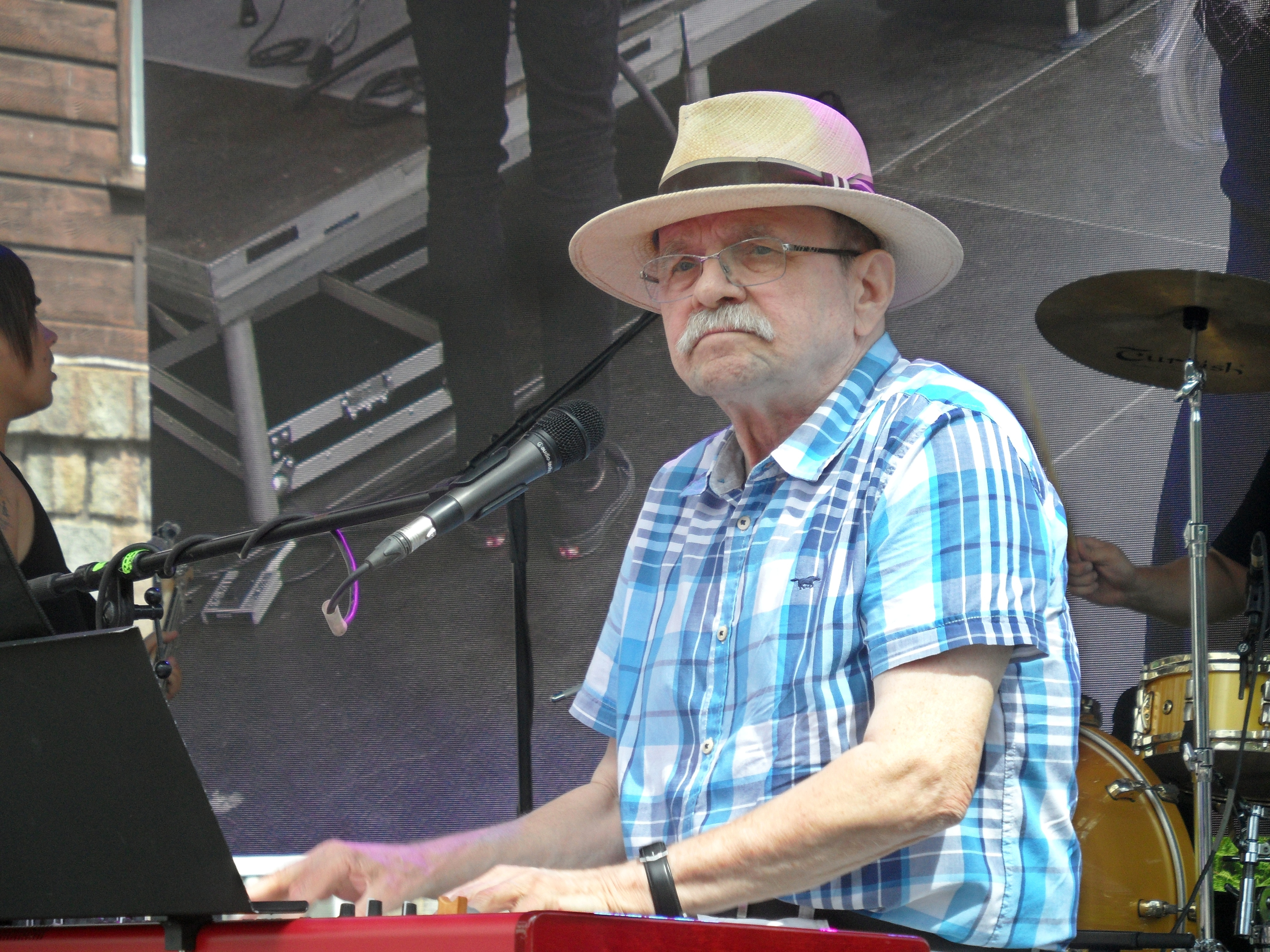
Uhlíř performing in 2024

=== with Karel Šíp ===
- Šíp a Uhlíř v Hitšarádě (1985)
- Když jsou na to dva (1989)
- A další hity (1990) – with Triky a pověry
- Šíp a Uhlíř v Šarádě (1993)

=== with Zdeněk Svěrák ===
- Hodina zpěvu (1992)
- Není nutno... (1993)
- ...aby bylo přímo veselo (1994)
- Hlavně nesmí býti smutno... (1995)
- ...natož aby se brečelo (1997)
- Zpěvník (compilation, 1997)
- Nemít prachy – nevadí... (1999)
- Vánoční a noční sny (2000)
- Nemít srdce – vadí... (2001)
- ...zažít krachy – nevadí! (2003)
- ...zažít nudu – vadí! (2005)
- 20 let písniček z pořadu Hodina zpěvu (compilation, 2007)
- Hity a skorohity (compilation, 2008)
- Takovej ten s takovou tou (2009)
- Písničky o zvířatech (compilation, 2010)
- Alchymisti (2011)
- Jupí (2014)
- Operky (compilation, 2016)
- Cirkusový stan (2016)
- Ty nejlepší písničky v novém kabátě (2016)
