= Zedník =

Zedník (feminine: Zedníková) is a Czech surname, meaning 'bricklayer', 'mason'. Notable people with the surname include:

- Heinz Zednik (born 1940), Austrian opera singer
- Richard Zedník (born 1976), Slovak hockey player
- Vladimír Zedník (born 1947), Czech tennis player
