= Oldřich Navrátil =

Czech actor

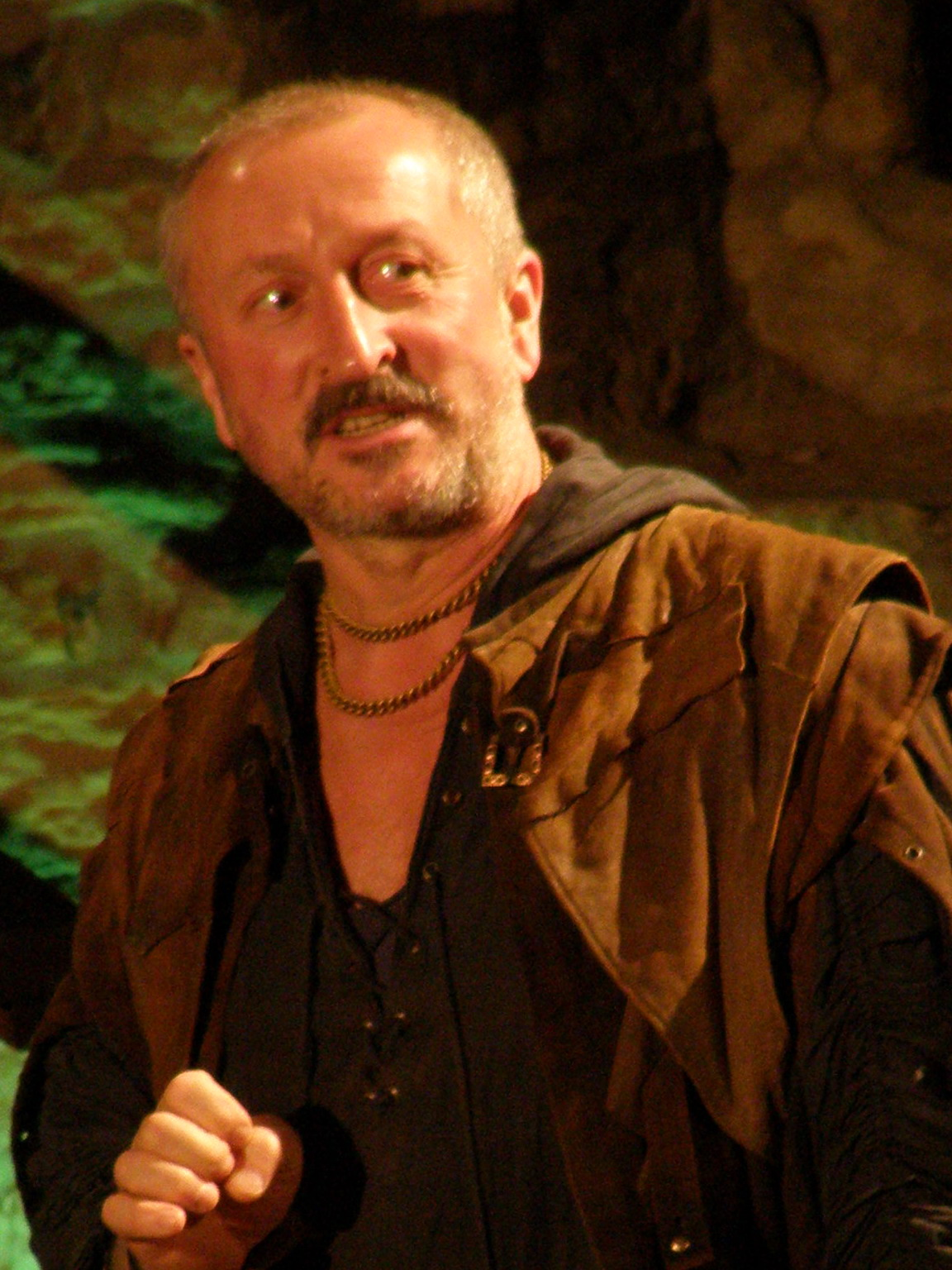
- Born: 21 October 1952 (age 73); Třebíč, Czechoslovakia (now Czech Republic)
- Occupation: Actor
- Years active: 1976–present

Oldřich Navrátil (born 21 October 1952) is a Czech stage, film and television actor. He has appeared in 75 films and television shows since 1976 and starred in the 1982 film Incomplete Eclipse, which was entered into the 33rd Berlin International Film Festival, but was not accepted as a nominee.

In recent years Navrátil has become a well-known, albeit reclusive, soap opera star. On 6 February 2018, Navrátil announced his candidacy for Senate at Třebíč district, his birthplace. He is a candidate of TOP 09.

== Selected filmography ==
- Incomplete Eclipse (1982)
- How the World Is Losing Poets (1982)
- Povídka s dobrým koncem (1986)
- Dobří holubi se vracejí (1987)
- Lotrando a Zubejda (1997)
- Jak básníci neztrácejí naději (2004)
- The City of the Sun (2005)
- Rafťáci (2006)
- Ďáblova lest (2009)
