= Pavel Zedníček =

Czech actor

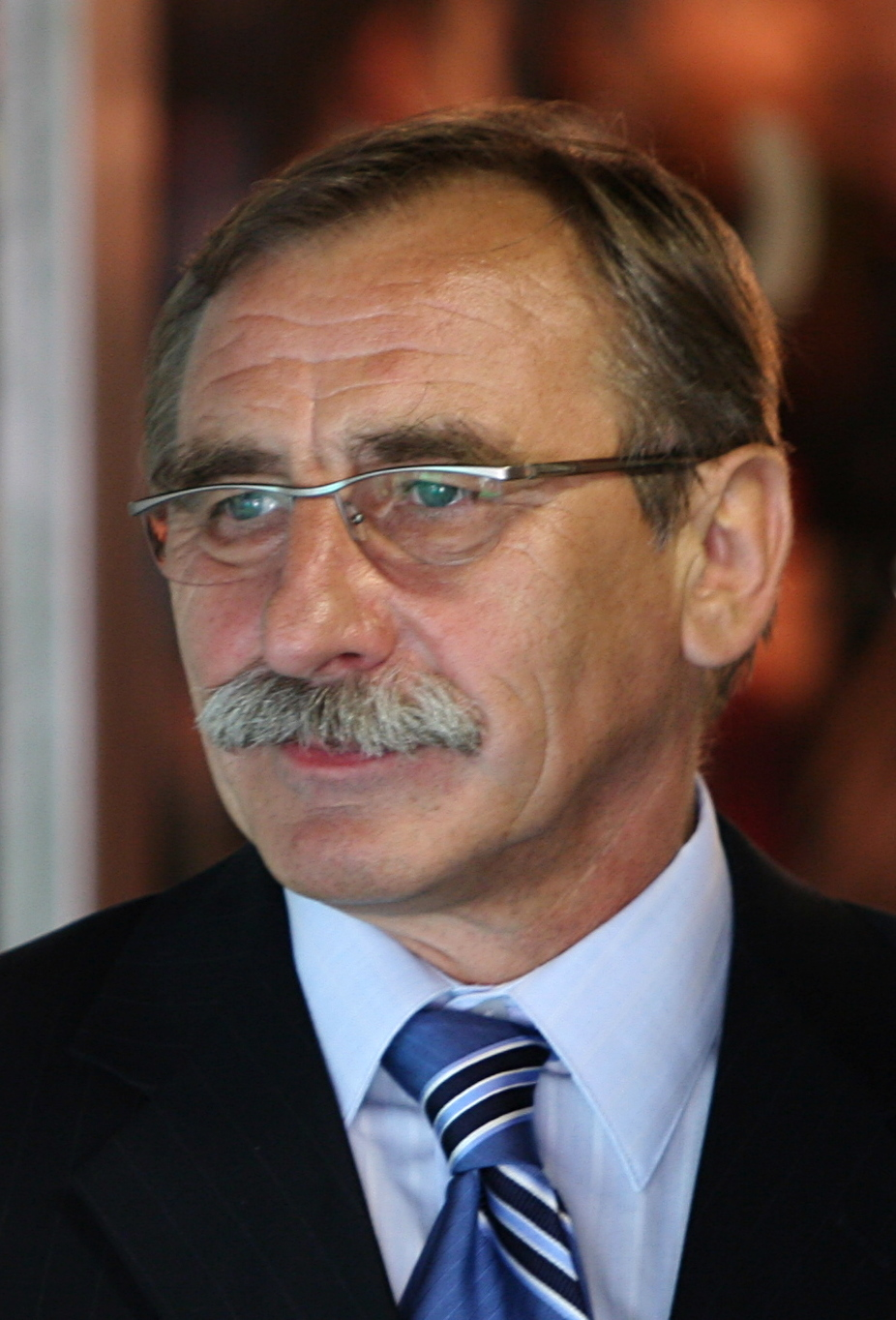
- Pavel Zedníček
- Born: 1 November 1949 (age 76); Hoštice-Heroltice, Czechoslovakia
- Occupation: Actor
- Years active: 1976–present

Pavel Zedníček (born 1 November 1949 in Hoštice-Heroltice) is a Czech actor. He appeared in more than sixty films between 1976 and 2011.

== Filmography ==
Film
Year	Title	Role	Notes
1984	Fešák Hubert		
1987	Dobří holubi se vracejí		
1988	How Poets Are Enjoying Their Lives		
2004	Jak básníci neztrácejí naději		
2005	Kousek nebe		
2009	Men in Rut		

TV
Year	Title	Role	Notes
1991	The Territory of White Deer		
1996	Nováci		
