= Pavel Kříž =

Czech actor and psychotherapist

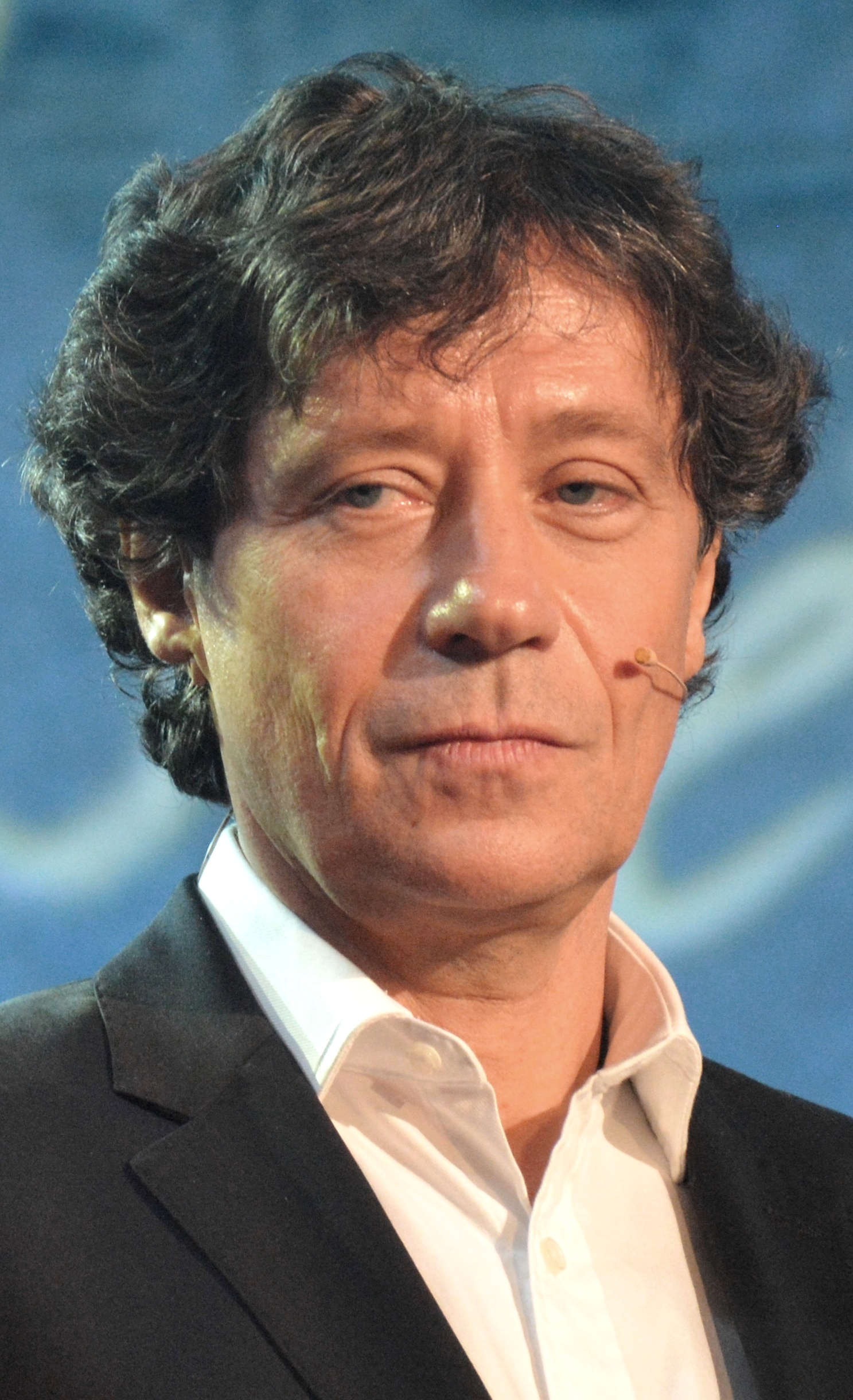
- Kříž in 2016
- Born: 18 April 1961 (age 64); Brno, Czechoslovakia
- Occupations: Actor, psychotherapist
- Years active: 1981–present
- Spouse: Bonnie Glover

Pavel Kříž (born 18 April 1961 in Brno) is a Czech actor and psychotherapist.

In December 2010 Kříž won the fourth season of StarDance with his professional partner Alice Stodůlková.

== Selected filmography ==
=== Film ===
- Jak svět přichází o básníky (1982)
- Jak básníci přicházejí o iluze (1984)
- The Night of the Emerald Moon (1985)
- Sleeping Dogs (1997)
- Doktor Živago (2002, TV)
- Deník Anne Frankové (2001, TV)
- Vůně vanilky (2001, TV)
- In nomine patris (2004, TV)
- Portraits in Dramatic Time (2011)
- Mission: Impossible – Ghost Protocol (2011) - Marek Stefanski
- How Poets Wait for a Miracle (2016)
- Nabarvené ptáče (2019)
- Klec (2019, TV)

=== Television ===
- První krok (2009) - Max Reznícek
- Obchoďák (2009-2010) - Pplk. Ales Bílek
- První republika (2014) - Richard Benoni
- Přístav (2016-2017) - Viktor Drtina
- Krejzovi (2018)
