= Jana Hlaváčová =

Czech actress (1938–2024)

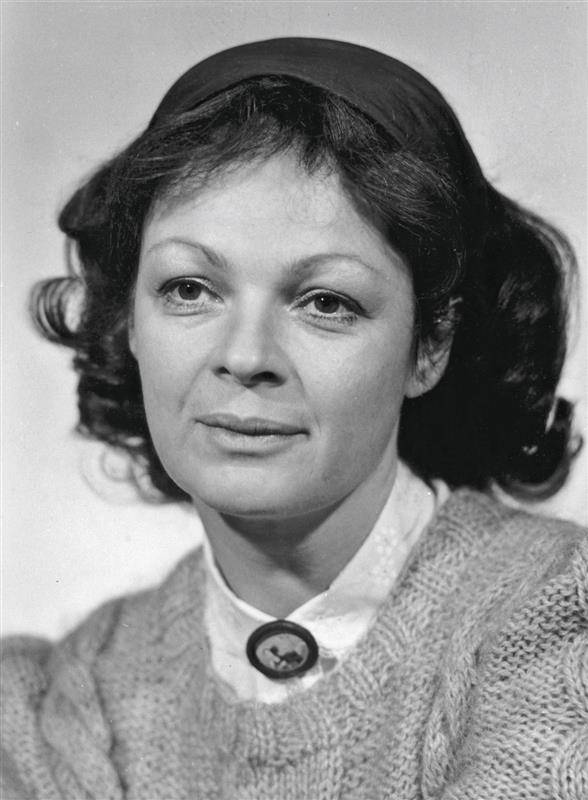
- Born: 26 March 1938; Prague, Czechoslovakia
- Died: 13 January 2024 (aged 85); Praha-Modřany, Czechia
- Occupation: Actress
- Years active: 1959–2011
- Spouse(s): Luděk Munzar (m. 1965) Jiří Michný
- Children: 2, Barbora Munzarová

Jana Hlaváčová (26 March 1938 – 13 January 2024) was a Czech actress. She starred in the film Operace Silver A under director Jiří Strach in 2007. Hlaváčová died on 13 January 2024, at the age of 85.

== Decorations ==
Awarded by Czech Republic

- Medal of Merit (2024)
