= Josef Somr =

Czech actor (1934–2022)

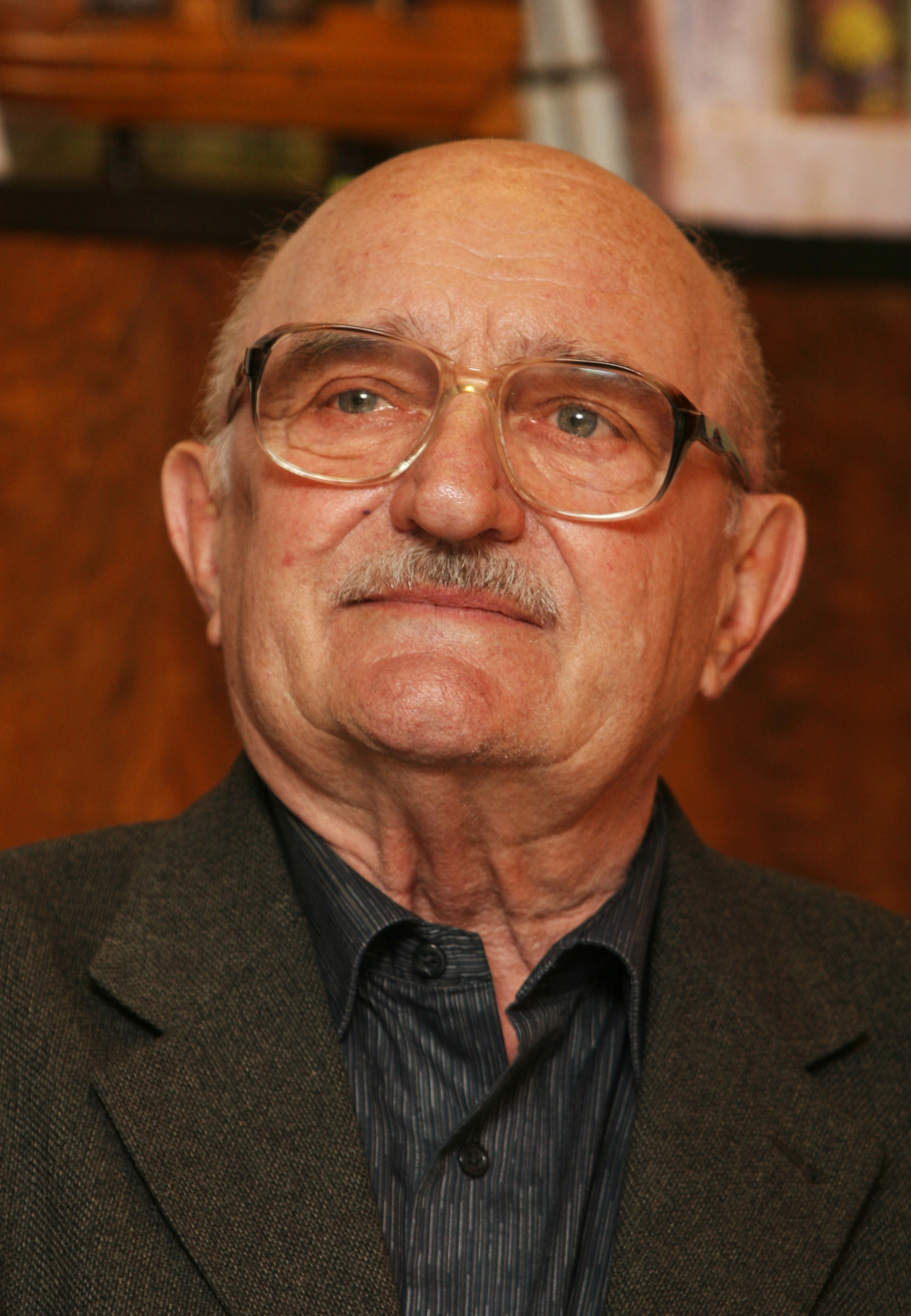
- Somr in 2008
- Born: 14 April 1934; Vracov, Czechoslovakia
- Died: 16 October 2022 (aged 88); Nová Ves pod Pleší, Czech Republic
- Occupation: Actor
- Years active: 1966–2022

Josef Somr (14 April 1934 – 16 October 2022) was a Czech actor. He was noted for starring in the Oscar-winning 1966 film Closely Watched Trains, as well as in The Joke.

== Early life ==
Somr was born in Vracov, Czechoslovakia, on 14 April 1934. He studied at the Janáček Academy of Music and Performing Arts, graduating in 1956.

== Career ==
Somr started his acting career at various regional theatres, before becoming a part of The Drama Club in Prague. There, he received roles in productions directed by Ladislav Smocek, Jan Kačer, and Jiří Menzel. He began acting in films starting in the mid-1960s, making his film debut in Accused (1964). His following role saw him play the libidinous train dispatcher Hubička in Closely Watched Trains by Menzel. Film critic John Simon described Somr's performance as "so spontaneous, unconcerned, and complete ... that it affects our entire sensorium – finger tips, nostrils, and palate no less than eyes and ears". The film won the Academy Award for Best Foreign Language Film in April 1968. Somr subsequently played scientist Ludvík Jahn in the lead role of The Joke (1969) by Jaromil Jireš. He went on to feature in Poslední propadne peklu under director Ludvík Ráža in 1982.

According to Michal Bregant – who headed the Czech Film Archive – Somr preferred acting in theatre, despite having roles in over 170 films. This was because he disliked revealing his face in profile, which was captured more easily on camera. He joined the National Theatre drama ensemble in 1978, on the invitation of Miroslav Macháček. He played the marshal in The White Disease by Karel Čapek, as well as the town councillor Jakub Busek in Naši furianti. Somr's portrayal of Mister Frantisek in Romance pro křídlovku garnered him a Thalia Award in 1998. He also did voice acting for radio, audiobooks, and poetry readings, and featured in film adaptations of Czech fairy tales.

== Personal life ==
Somr was married to Alena Somrová until his death. He died on 16 October 2022 at Na Pleši hospital in Nová Ves pod Pleší. He was 88 years old.

== Awards and honours ==
Somr was conferred the Medal of Merit by Václav Havel in 2005. Seven years later, he received the Czech Lion Award for Unique Contribution to Czech Film. He was subsequently bestowed a lifetime achievement award at the 2014 Thalia Awards for his theatre work.

== Selected filmography ==
- Closely Watched Trains (or Closely Observed Trains) (1966)
- Valley of the Bees (1967)
- The Joke (1969)
- Funeral Ceremonies (1969)
- Fruit of Paradise (1970)
- Což takhle dát si špenát (1977)
- Those Wonderful Movie Cranks (1978)
- Poslední propadne peklu (1982)
- How the World Is Losing Poets (1982)
- Fešák Hubert (1984)
- Jak básníci neztrácejí naději (2004)
- I am all good (2008)
