= Vejvoda =

Vejvoda (feminine: Vejvodová) is a Czech surname, an archaic form of vévoda (meaning 'voivode'). Notable people with the surname include:

- Goran Vejvoda (born 1956), Serbian record producer
- Hana Vejvodová (1963–1994), Czech pianist and composer
- Jaromír Vejvoda (1902–1988), Czech composer
- Jaroslav Vejvoda (1920–1996), Czech footballer and manager
- Josef Vejvoda (born 1945), Czech musician
- Miroslav Vejvoda (1932–1994), Czech sailor
- Otakar Vejvoda (born 1972), Czech ice hockey player
- Pavlína Vejvodová (born 1989), Czech para-cyclist
- Zuzana Vejvodová (born 1980), Czech actor

== See also ==
- 28614 Vejvoda, main-belt asteroid
