= Ztracená brána =

- Genre: Crime; Mystery
- Written by: Arnošt Vašíček; Jiří Strach
- Directed by: Jiří Strach
- Starring: Ivan Trojan; Jiří Dvořák; Anna Geislerová
- Country of origin: Czech Republic
- Original language: Czech
- No. of seasons: 1
- No. of episodes: 3

Production
- Running time: 60 Minutes

Original release
- Network: Czech Television
- Release: September 9 – September 23, 2012

Related
- Ďáblova lest

Lost Gate (Czech: Ztracená brána) is a Czech mystery series that premiered on Czech Television in September 2012. It is a sequel to the three-part series Ďáblova lest (2009). It was written by Arnošt Vašíček and directed by Jiří Strach.

The pair of police investigators Petr Sumara and Lenka Šímová investigate a case of a serial killer in the environment of the Prague lodge of freemasons with the help of religionist Michal Runa (Ivan Trojan).

== Cast ==
- Ivan Trojan as religionist Michal Runa
- Jiří Dvořák as commissioner Petr Sumara
- Anna Geislerová as Lenka Šímová
- Pavel Rímský as Bervida
- Viktor Preiss as Rohan
- Jana Pidrmanová as Tereza
- Matěj Hádek as Jandák
- Pavel Kříž as Samuel Goldstein
- Josef Abrhám as Kruml
- Tomáš Töpfer as Taussig
- Petr Pelzer as Haluzka
- Táňa Medvecká as botanist
- Zuzana Stivínová as Ormová
- Martin Myšička as pathologist
- František Němec as Abbott
- Jiří Langmajer as Zábranský
- Martin Preiss as lawyer
- Anna Kulovaná as bartender
- Martin Stropnický as dean

== Episodes ==
Episode	Directed by	Written by	Original air date	Czech viewers (millions)
Episode 1	Jiří Strach	Arnošt Vašíček, Jiří Strach	9 September 2012	0.964
Episode 2	Jiří Strach	Arnošt Vašíček, Jiří Strach	16 September 2012	1
Episode 3	Jiří Strach	Arnošt Vašíček, Jiří Strach	23 September 2012	1.06

== Production ==
The series was shot in various locations of Prague and Znojmo. most of the footage from the underground comes from the Znojmo underground. Filming was also done, for example, in the Prague subway, under the Čech bridge, by Motolské potok, in the Prague sewage treatment plant or in the Vyšehrad casemates. There were over 50 filming days. The director of the second crew was Vojtěch Moravec.
