= Miřetice =

Miřetice may refer to places in the Czech Republic:

- Miřetice (Benešov District), a municipality and village in the Central Bohemian Region
- Miřetice (Chrudim District), a municipality and village in the Pardubice Region
- Miřetice, a village and part of Vacov in the South Bohemian Region
- Miřetice u Klášterce nad Ohří, a village and part of Klášterec nad Ohří in the Ústí nad Labem Region
- Miřetice u Vintířova, a village and part of Radonice (Chomutov District) in the Ústí nad Labem Region
