= Angel of the Lord (disambiguation) =

The (or an) Angel of the Lord is an entity appearing repeatedly in the Old and New Testaments.

Angel of the Lord may also refer to:

- Angel of the Lord (film), a 2005 Czech film
- Angel of the Lord 2, a 2016 Czech film
