= Operace Silver A =

2007 Czech drama film

- Written by: Josef Konáš; Lucie Konášová
- Directed by: Jiří Strach
- Starring: Klára Issová; Tatiana Vilhelmová; Jiří Dvořák; Ivan Trojan; David Švehlík
- Country of origin: Czech Republic
- Original language: Czech

Production
- Cinematography: Martin Šec
- Running time: 149 minutes

Original release
- Release: 15 April 2007

Operace Silver A is a Czech drama film directed by Jiří Strach, based on the military operation of the same name. It was released in 2007, winning various awards from the Czech Film and Television Academy that year.

== Cast ==
- Klára Issová as Hana Kroupová
- Tatiana Vilhelmová as Táňa Hladíková
- Jiří Dvořák as Alfréd Bartoš
- Ivan Trojan as František Hladík
- David Švehlík as Václav Kroupa
- Miroslav Táborský as Arnošt Košťál
- Aleš Háma as Josef Valčík
- Matěj Hádek as Jiří Potůček
- Marek Taclík as Hubert Freylach
- Viktor Preiss as Wilhelm Schultze
- Jan Vondráček as Gerhard Clages
- Jana Hlaváčová as Nohýnková
- Taťjana Medvecká as Anděla
- Alois Švehlík as Kroupa
- Dana Syslová as Kroupová
