= Ďáblova lest =

- Genre: Crime; Mystery
- Written by: Arnošt Vašíček
- Directed by: Jiří Strach
- Starring: Ivan Trojan; Jiří Dvořák; Anna Geislerová
- Country of origin: Czech Republic
- Original language: Czech
- No. of seasons: 1
- No. of episodes: 3

Production
- Running time: 60 Minutes

Original release
- Network: Czech Television
- Release: February 15 – March 1, 2009

Related
- Ztracená brána

Satan's Stratagem (Czech: Ďáblova lest) is a Czech crime mystery miniseries that premiered on Czech Television in February and March 2009. It was written by Arnošt Vašíček and directed by Jiří Strach.

Commissioner Sumara and his new colleague Šímová investigate an attempted ritual murder that has some connection to archaeological excavations at the Podlažice Monastery. They ask religionist Dr. Runa for help. Members of Schola Gregoriana Pragensis appear in a small roles of Benedictine monks singing Gregorian chant.

The series is sometimes compared to The Da Vinci Code, and Dr. Runa to Robert Langdon.

== Plot ==
A student who worked with her classmates and teachers on an archaeological excavation in the Podlažice Monastery is found frightened and covered in blood (but unharmed) and with number 666 written by blood on her forehead. Chief Commissioner Sumara, who is known for his alcohol problems, and his new colleague are taking over the investigation. They enlist the help of the religionist Dr. Runa. A murdered young man is soon found, again with the number 666 on his forehead, and a pentagram with the number inside is drawn near him. A friend of Dr. Runa's daughter Iveta is arrested because he was near the crime scene during both crimes. But then another murder happens. Dr. Runa comes up with a code by which the killer searches for victims (related to the numbers in the pentagram), and it turns out that his daughter, who has just disappeared, is in danger. Together with her friend, he then tries to save Iveta. The solution to the mystery is mystical and related to the Codex Gigas book, the magic square 6×6, the Porta coeli Convent and the murder of Wenceslas III in 1306.

== Cast ==
- Ivan Trojan as PhDr. Michal Runa, Ph.D.
- Jiří Dvořák as commissioner Petr Sumara
- Anna Geislerová as Lenka Šímová
- Tereza Voříšková as Iveta Runová, Runa's daughter
- Vojtěch Dyk as Daniel Ferinčák, Iveta's boyfriend

== Episodes ==
| Episode | | Directed by | Written by | Original air date | Czech viewers (millions) |
|---|---|---|---|---|---|
| 1 | Noc hadů | Jiří Strach | Arnošt Vašíček | 15 February 2009 | 1.455 |
| 2 | Vražedný kód | Jiří Strach | Arnošt Vašíček | 22 February 2009 | |
| 3 | Brána nebes | Jiří Strach | Arnošt Vašíček | 1 March 2024 | 1.453 |
