= Dana Syslová =

Czech actress (born 1945)

- Born: 11 November 1945 (age 79); Prague, Czechoslovakia
- Occupation: Actress
- Years active: 1963–present
- Spouse: Vlastimil Hašek
- Children: 2

Dana Syslová (born November 11, 1945) is a Czech actress. She starred in the film Operace Silver A under director Jiří Strach in 2007.
