= Jan Vondráček =

Czech actor

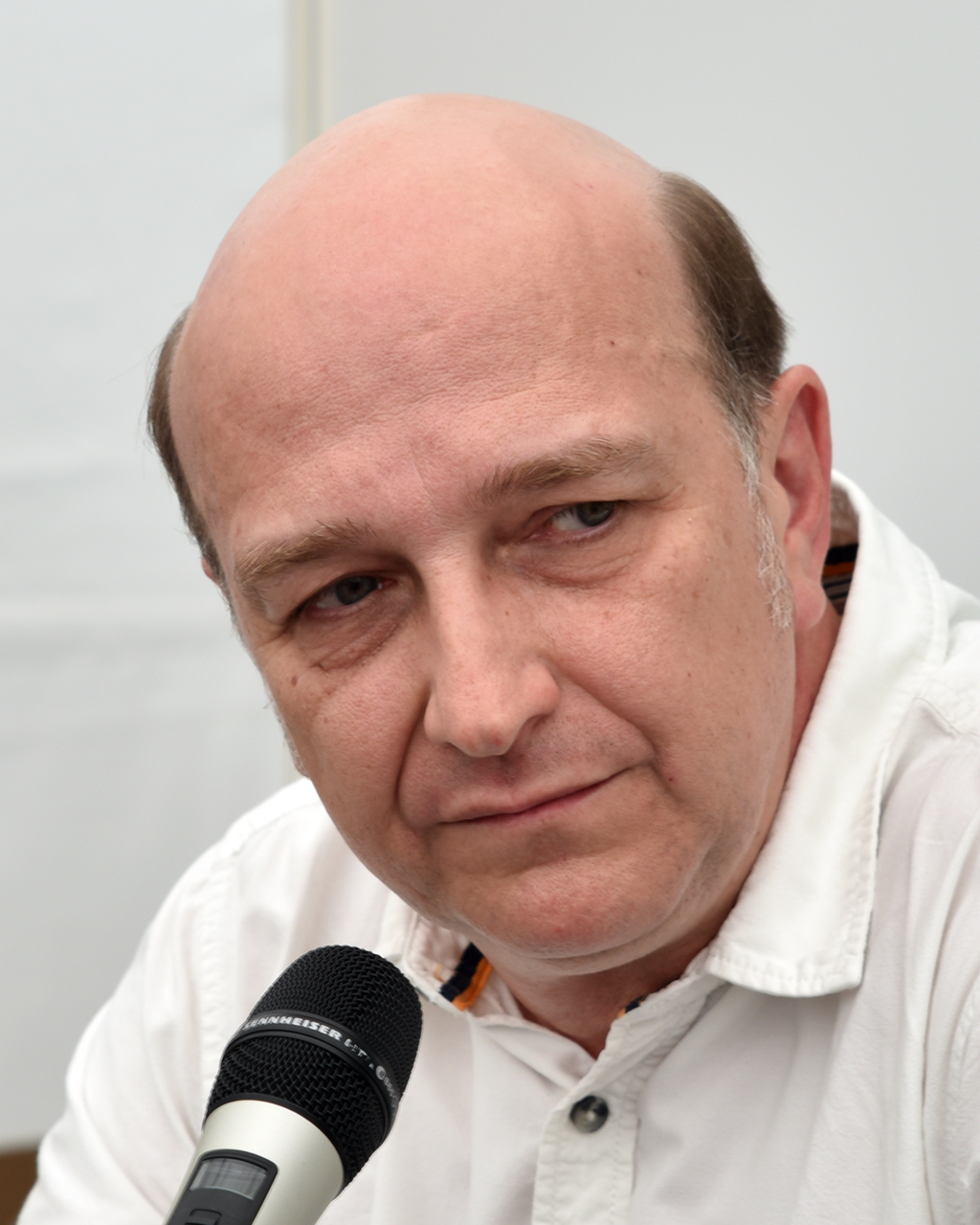
- Jan Vondráček (2022)
- Born: 16 August 1966 (age 59); Prague, Czechoslovakia
- Occupations: Actor, dubber
- Years active: 1984–present

Jan Vondráček (born 16 August 1966 in Prague) is a Czech actor and dubber. He starred in the film Operace Silver A under director Jiří Strach in 2007. Since 9 January 2023, he has been the voice announcer for Trams in Prague, as part of the Prague Integrated Transport system. He is the successor to Dagmar Hazdrová who had spoken the announcements on the Trams in Prague from 1996 until 2022.
