= Krahulik =

Krahulik is a surname. Notable people with the surname include:

- Jon Krahulik (1944–2005), Justice of the Indiana Supreme Court
- Mike Krahulik (born 1977), American webcomic artist
- Václav Krahulík (born 1966), Czech pianist, composer, musicologist, and teacher
