= Ležáky =

Czechoslovak village razed by Nazis in 1942

Coordinates: 49°49′57″N 15°54′01″E

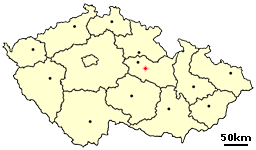
Location of Ležáky in the Czech Republic

Ležáky (Czech pronunciation: [ˈlɛʒaːkɪ], German: Ležak, from 1939: Lezaky), in the Miřetice municipality, was a village in Czechoslovakia. During the German occupation of Czechoslovakia, it was razed by Nazi forces as reprisal for Reich Protector Reinhard Heydrich's assassination in late spring 1942.

== History ==
Ležáky was inhabited by poor stonecutters and cottagers living in eight houses near the mill. The village was named after the Ležák rivulet.

Beginning 24 September 1941, SS-Obergruppenführer and General of Police Reinhard Heydrich was Acting Reichsprotektor for the Nazi Protectorate of Bohemia and Moravia. The area had been occupied by Nazi Germany since 5 April 1939.

In December 1941, several Allied paratroopers were dropped into the region. Some were sent to assassinate Reinhard Heydrich in an action known as Operation Anthropoid. Another group was part of Operation Silver A. Several Ležáky residents helped the latter group by providing a hiding place for their radio set.

On the morning of 27 May 1942, Heydrich's car was attacked by Jozef Gabčík and Jan Kubiš, Czech and Slovak soldiers acting for the Czechoslovak government-in-exile. Heydrich died of his injuries on 4 June 1942.

=== Massacre ===
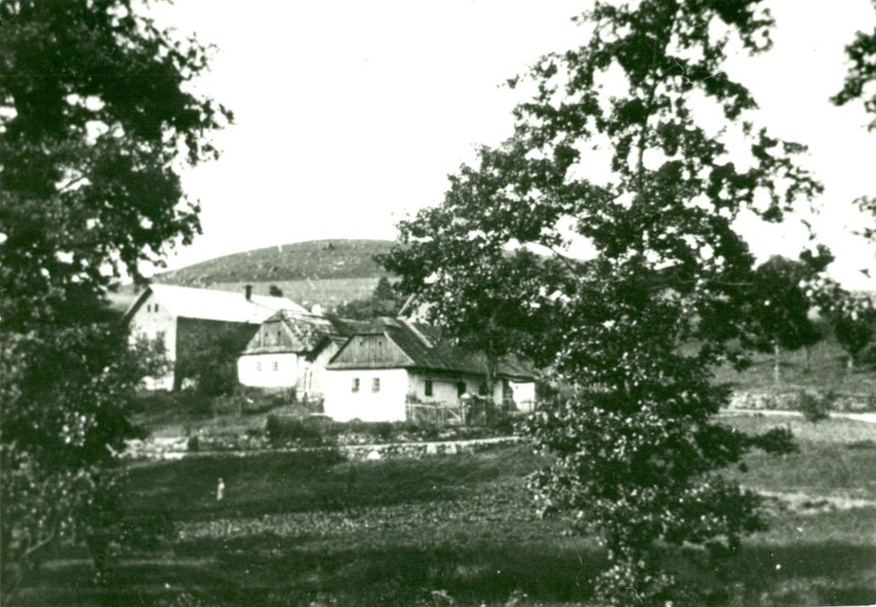
Ležáky before 1942

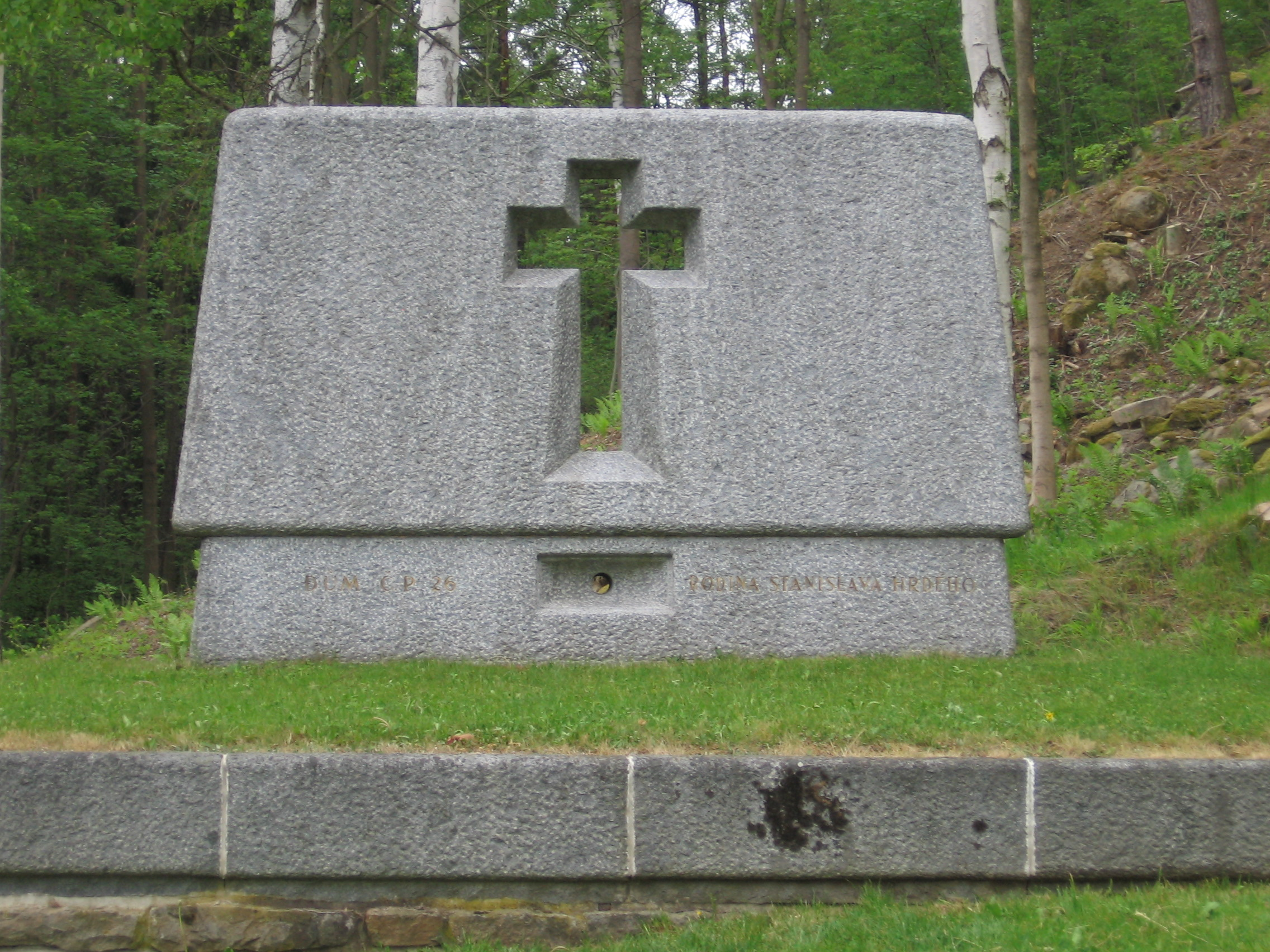
After the war the village was not rebuilt; memorials to the murdered families were built on the locations of former houses (as shown here for house No. 26 belonging to the Hrdý family)

After the assassination, the Nazis imposed martial law. On 10 June, the village of Lidice was razed and all male inhabitants aged 14 to 84 were shot. Lidice was selected because its residents were falsely accused of harbouring local resistance partisans and aiding Operation Anthropoid team members.

Gestapo agents found a radio transmitter in Ležáky, which belonged to Operation Silver A. Alfréd Bartoš, the leader of resistance group Silver A, killed himself shortly thereafter. While not everyone in Lidice had been killed, Gerhard Clages, the commander of the Gestapo in Pardubice, urged the SS to be merciless in Ležáky. He organized a massacre.

In the early afternoon of 24 June, Ležáky was surrounded by 150 Gestapo men under the command of Clages, 30 Czech collaborators, and over 300 other SS men. They removed all inhabitants, and the village was destroyed. All 33 adults (both men and women) were shot. Only 13 children were spared. A 26 June press release announced the outcome. In mid-December 1943, the Ležáky ruins were removed by 65 men from Nazi work camps.

Of the 13 children, sisters Jarmila and Marie Šťulík were selected for "Germanization". After the war, the girls were located and returned from Germany to surviving extended families in Czechoslovakia. The remaining 11 children were sent to the Chełmno extermination camp, where they were gassed in summer 1942, together with one girl from Lidice.

Unlike Lidice, Ležáky was not rebuilt after the war. Only memorials mark the sites of former houses.

On 1 September 1942, Clages was promoted to Hauptsturmführer for organizing the massacres. He was promoted to Sturmbannführer on 9 November 1944. However, that promotion was posthumous; Clages had been killed in action in Hungary on 15 October 1944.

== See also ==
- Lidice
- Javoříčko
- German war crimes
- Collective punishment

== Literature ==
- Jarmila Doležalová (one of the two children that survived the war), František Vašek: Křižovatky času – Ležáky v datech (Crossroads of time - Ležáky in dates), 2007. History of the village since first written mention until today.
- Gerwarth, Robert (2011). Hitler's Hangman: The Life of Heydrich. New Haven, CT: Yale University Press. ISBN 978-0-300-11575-8.
- Kaplan, Jan and Nosarzewska, Krystyna (1997). Prague: The Turbulent Century, Koenemann Verlagsgesellschaft mbH, Koeln. ISBN 3-89508-528-6
- Vojtěch Kyncl: Ležáky - Obyčejná vesnice, SILVER A a pardubické gestapo v zrcadle heydrichiády, 2009, (cz PDF), ISBN 978-80-7415-009-8
