= Angel of the Lord (film) =

2005 Czech fantasy comedy film

- Czech: Anděl Páně
- Directed by: Jiří Strach
- Screenplay by: Lucie Konášová
- Based on: Fairy tales by Božena Němcová
- Produced by: Magdalena Sedláková
- Starring: Ivan Trojan; Jiří Dvořák; Zuzana Kajnarová; David Švehlík
- Cinematography: Petr Polák
- Edited by: Zdeněk Patočka
- Music by: Miloš Bok
- Production company: Czech Television
- Distributed by: Warner Bros. Pictures
- Release date: 3 November 2005
- Running time: 90 minutes
- Country: Czech Republic
- Language: Czech
- Budget: 25 Million CZK

Angel of the Lord (Czech: Anděl Páně) is a 2005 Czech fantasy comedy film directed by Jiří Strach. Based on folk tales by Božena Němcová, it tells the story of a ne'er-do-well angel who descends to Earth to prove himself and in the process, saves his own soul.

In 2016, Strach directed a sequel, Angel of the Lord 2.

== Plot ==
Up in Heaven, the bumbling angel Petronel feels misunderstood and unfairly treated. He complains to God and asks for an opportunity to prove himself. God grants him this request by asking him to replace Saint Peter at the pearly gates while the latter is away.

At the gates, Petronel meets the devil Uriáš, who is there to collect sinners once they have been judged. Petronel sentences three souls to Hell, then begins to play cards with the devil, neglecting his duties. A lineup develops, and God shows up to investigate. He rebukes Petronel, who takes it upon himself to castigate the Lord instead of taking responsibility for his negligence. God then decides to punish the impudent angel by sending him down to Earth in the form of a mendicant monk. He is tasked with saving the soul of one sinner within the span of a day. If he fails, he will be condemned to Hell. Uriáš is sent down to accompany Petronel.

Meanwhile, another story is taking place on Earth. Count Maxmilián spends his time in revelry, while his administrators and servants rob him behind his back. Petronel arrives at the castle as a beggar and mistakenly fulfills the wishes of the miscreants taking advantage of Maxmilián, instantly turning him into a beggar and enriching the knaves. The Virgin Mary, who witnesses these events from Heaven, reproaches Petronel. The angel promises to make up for his errors and proceeds to fix the consequences of his misguided actions.

As the angel's time on Earth expires, he is surprised not to find himself in Hell but back in Heaven. He queries God about this, wondering why he was forgiven, since he failed in his original task, to save a sinner. The Lord reveals to Petronel that he managed to save himself by righting his wrongs. The story ends with a Christmas celebration.

== Cast and characters ==
- Ivan Trojan as angel Petronel
- Jiří Dvořák as devil Uriáš
- Zuzana Kajnarová as maid Dorotka
- David Švehlík as count Maxmilián
- Oldřich Navrátil as estate administrator Metoděj
- Zuzana Stivínová Jr. as keyholder Francka
- Jiří Bartoška as God
- Klára Issová as the Virgin Mary
- Jiří Pecha as Saint Nicholas
- Veronika Žilková as Saint Veronica
- Anna Geislerová as Saint Anne
- Gabriela Osvaldová as Archangel Gabriel
- Josef Somr as the reeve
- Jana Štěpánková as Chef Róza
- Jana Hlaváčová as the soul of widow Vomáčková
- Jiřina Jirásková as the soul of abbess Magdalena
- Stanislav Zindulka as the soul of beadle Lorenc
- Oldřich Vlach as the servant Josef
- Boni Pueri as angels

== See also ==
- List of films about angels
