= Fidlovačka =

The name Fidlovačka may refer to:

- Fidlovačka aneb Žádný hněv a žádná rvačka – a play by Czech writer Josef Kajetán Tyl
- Fidlovačka aneb Žádný hněv a žádná rvačka (film) – a Czech movie from 1930 based on the play
- Divadlo Na Fidlovačce – a theater in Prague
