= Miloš Bok =

Czech composer and musician

Miloš Bok (born 16 January 1968) is a Czech composer, conductor, pianist, organist, choirmaster and music educator.

== Life and career ==
Miloš Bok was born on 16 January 1968 in Prague. He graduated in piano playing in 1988 at the Prague Conservatory under Jaromír Kříž and, shortly after, became pianist and composer Josef Páleníček’s last student at the Prague Academy of Music, where he studied until the latter's death (1991). During his youth, he has won six prizes in various national and international piano competitions. Under the communist regime, he was prevented from studying conducting and composition. After the fall of the totalitarian regime, he has studied conducting under Mario Klemens, again at the Prague Conservatoire (1991–1993). Numerous important Czech orchestras and choirs have performed under Bok's baton (the Prague Symphony Orchestra, the Prague Radio Symphony Orchestra, the Prague National Theatre Orchestra...). His work is documented on a whole series of recordings (over 25 CDs as of 2018), and he has been the subject and appeared in many programmes for the Czech Radio and the Czech Television.

In 1998, together with several other musicians and artists, he founded the Elgar Art Society. He is an active organist in the dioceses of Plzeň and Litoměřice. Since 1987, he has been teaching in various music schools. As part of his pedagogic activities, since 1999, he is leading the Western Bohemia St Cecilia Sinfonietta, an ensemble formed of students of Karlovy Vary’s elementary and music schools in which he had been teaching during the years 1999–2016. In 2002–2011, he has also been leading the Karlovy Vary Mixed Choir.

In 2017, the Czech copyright protection Association OSA has awarded him with the awards of Most Successful Classical Music Composer and of Classical Composition of the Year.

Miloš Bok lives with his wife and seven children on a presbytery in the village of Močidlec, in Western Bohemia.

== Compositions ==
He is composing since his childhood. After his first unfinished attempts (a piano concerto and a symphony), his gradual conversion to Catholicism led him to realise that his role in life would be to lift church music up. Thus confined, his creation and activities have touched upon all music forms, and his work has given birth to a very distinctive original musical world. His first finished work, the Missa Solemnis (1986), ranks among the most performed contemporary vocal-instrumental pieces (more than fifty performances, including one in Carnegie Hall, in 1999, and on Prague's St Vitus and Adalbert Cathedral, in 2015). It was followed by several smaller pieces: the Missa Brevis in E♭ major (1987) and Missa Brevis in F♯ major (1988, rev. 2003), as well as many smaller works intended to accompany the liturgy, from festive mass songs (Lord, Have Mercy, 1996; Alleluia, Be Alive, 2007; I Believe in One Church, 2008...), through original adaptations of psalms and hymns (Hymn to the Holy Spirit, 2005; De Profundis, 2009; Psalm 131, 2010; Magnificat, 2011), cycles of Christmas carols (Symphonic Carols, 1998; Dreamy Carols, 2006), up to Choir songs for the Nový Dvůr Trappist monastery (2001). His monumental Credo in F♯ minor (2006) also has to be pointed out, whose length exceeds the regular framework of the mass rites and constitutes the composer's personal confession. In a personal letter from 2006, Pope Benedict XVI has highlighted the quality and the conversional effect of Bok's music. In 2015, the Czech Bishops’ Conference has awarded Bok for his church music and his activities for the Catholic Church.

The apex of his work is his trilogy of oratorios for soli, children's and mixed choirs, organ and symphonic orchestra. The first of these oratorios is The Gnomes of the Valley of Křinice (1993) which was greeted by success at the author's graduating concert for the end of his conducting studies in Prague's Rudolfinum Hall. It was followed by Saint Zdislava (2001). The last oratorio is The Apocalypse on the Slopes of Kamenice, whose first part Bok has been performed with success in 2016 by world renowned conductor Manfred Honeck with the Czech Philharmonic in Prague's Rudolfinum Hall. The whole trilogy of oratorios constitutes a completely new and modern kind of spiritual composition. Formally, they combine a grandiose sonata layout with a principle of individual attacca sections whose titles and abstract text by the composer himself guide the listener's imagination. Bok's unique trilogy of oratorios, permeated with autobiographic elements, is a great meditation on death, the sensation of the upcoming apocalypse, as well as a celebration of the Roman Catholic Church.

One of the important aspects of Bok's work is its link to the spiritual and cultural geography of Northern and Western Bohemia, regions that have been drastically scarred by historic events damaging their social and cultural relationships. Bok has thus composed many original church pieces for chamber brass ensembles with organ (Symphonic Fanfares, 1999; Vakovian Litany, 2002; Funeral Music, 2008...), each of which is dedicated to a precise place. This is also the case for his piano fugues on postal codes of several parishes, for instance. He is active in these regions as conductor and prolific organiser of the local musical life, as witnessed by the fact that he has been performing the classic Czech Christmas Mass by Jan Jakub Ryba there for more than thirty years, as well as many other spiritual works (Mozart, Beethoven, Liszt, Dvořák etc.).

Another distinctive characteristic of Bok's work is the fact that most of his compositions exist in various versions: for orchestra, for chamber ensembles, for organ, for piano etc. This has come to be to facilitate performances, but often also on demand of many an interpreter, for whom Bok has elaborated various arrangements of parts of his spiritual works (Small Suite for five trombones, tuba and timpani, 2006; Chamber Carols for flute, trumpet, timpani, organ and string quartet with double bass, 2007; Křinice Suite for horn and string quartet, 2008 etc.). For some of his friends, he has also elaborated many arrangements and orchestrations either of their own works (Jaroslav Novák, Jaroslav Pelikán, Václav Krahulík, Jean-Gaspard Páleníček) or of works by great composers of the past (orchestration of J. Brahms’ Trio in E♭ major Op. 40 or of A. Bruckner’s Motets and movements of symphonies, arrangements for wind ensemble of L. van Beethoven’s and J. Haydn’s string quartets, most of which commissioned by world renowned hornist and conductor Radek Baborák). Most notably, In 2017, the Czech Olympic Committee commissioned a new arrangement of the Czech national anthem from Bok and, in 2018, world renowned conductor and pianist Daniel Barenboim commissioned an arrangement of Bach’s Chaconne for an ensemble of brass instruments from him.

Bok’s original film scores for director Jiří Strach is a whole different chapter and has often served as a preparatory laboratory for more personal compositions.

== Works ==
=== Oratorios ===
- The Gnomes from the Valley of Křinice (1993)
- Saint Zdislava (2001)
- The Apocalypse on the Slopes of Kamenice (2018)

=== Masses ===
- Missa Solemnis (1986)
- Missa Brevis in E♭ major (1987)
- Missa Brevis in F♯ major (1988)

=== Choral-orchestral works ===
- Lord Have Mercy on us (1996)
- Symphonic Carols (1998)
- Christ Our Lord is Born (1999)
- Hymn to the Holy Spirit (2005)
- Dreamy Carols (2005)
- Valse Allegro e Tranquillo (2005)
- Credo in F♯ minor (2006)
- Alleluia Be Alive (2007)
- I Believe in One Church (2008)
- Canticum Ex Apocalypsa (2008)
- De Profundis (2010)
- Psalm 131 (2010)
- Christ Our Lord is Born (2010)
- Magnificat (2011)
- Beata Viscera (2019)

=== Orchestral ===
- Vokovician Symphony (1984, fragment)
- Tisian Piano Concerto (1985, fragment)
- An Angel of the Lord – symphonic suite (2005)
- The Girl Who Stepped on Bread – symphonic suite (2007)
- Prelude and Fugue in F♯ major (2007)
- Three Lives – symphonic suite (2007)
- Funeral Music (2008)
- Symphony in E major "The Apocalypse on the Slopes of Kamenice" (2018)

=== Choral ===
- Choral Chants for Trappist Monastery (2001)
- Hymn to the Holy Spirit (2005)
- De Profundis (2008)
- Psalm 22 (2009)
- Psalm 131 (2010)
- Magnificat (2011)

=== Songs ===
- Ave Maria (2000)
- Evening Marian Song (2010)
- Beata Viscera (2010)

=== Instrumental ensembles ===
- Chamber Carols for flute, trumpet, timpani, organ and string quartet with double bass (2007)

=== Brass ensembles ===
- Symphonic Carols (1998)
- Symphonic Fanfares (1999)
- Litany of the Saints (2002)
- Small Suite (2006)
- Saint Wenceslas Intrada (2007)
- Pentecostal Intrada (2008)
- Funeral Music (2008)
- Advent Intrada (2012)
- Church Suite (2015)
- Intrada in Honour of Blessed Hroznata (2019)

=== Chamber ===
- Křinice Suite for horn and string quartet (2008)
- String Quartet in E major "The Apocalypse on the Slopes of Kamenice" (2014)

=== Instrumental ===
- Dreamy Carols for trumpet and organ (2005)

=== Piano ===
- Saint Zdislava Sonata (2001)
- Žlutice Fugue on 364 52 (2002)
- Dobřany Fugue on 334 41 (2003)
- Pohled Fugue on 582 21 (2003)
- Stará Role Fugue on 360 17 (2005)
- Credo Sonata in F♯ minor (2006)
- Prelude and Fugue in F♯ major (2007)
- Prelude in B♭ major (2019)

=== Stage music ===
- Biblic Stories (1991)

=== Film Scores ===
- An Angel of the Lord (2005)
- The Girl Who Trod on the Loaf (2007)
- Three Lives (2007)
- The Devil's Trap 1, 2 & 3 (2008)
- The Lost Portal 1, 2 & 3 (2011)
- The Midsummer Wreath (2015)

=== Arrangements ===
- Jaroslav Pelikán, Oboe Concerto, tr. for oboe and piano (1997)
- Jaroslav Novák, Arianna, tr. for symphonic orchestra (1997)
- Jean-Gaspard Páleníček, Notturno, tr. for symphonic orchestra (1997)
- Jiří Strejc, Missa Lux et Origo, rev. (1998)
- Jaroslav Pelikán, Bassoon Concerto, tr. for bassoon and piano (2001)
- Joseph Haydn, String Quartet in C major Op. 76, tr. for wind quartet (2003)
- Ludwig van Beethoven, String Quartet in F major Op. 18, tr. for wind quartet (2003)
- Theodor Hoch, Phantasia Concertante, tr. for trumpet and symphonic orchestra (2003)
- Ludwig van Beethoven, Rondino Op. post., tr. for string quintet and 2 horns (2003)
- Johannes Brahms, Horn Trio in E♭ major Op. 40, tr. for horn (or viola, or cello), violin and symphonic orchestra (2004)
- Anton Bruckner, Motets, tr. for brass ensemble and organ (2007)
- Anton Bruckner, Andante from the 7th Symphony, tr. for horn and organ (2008)
- Toots Thielemans, Bedarande Sommarvals, tr. for mixed choir and orchestra (2008)
- Carl Nielsen, Canto Serioso, tr. for instrumental ensemble (2008)
- Jakub Jan Ryba, Czech Christmas Mass, rev. (2008)
- Edmund Pascha, Kyrie, rev. (2008)
- Jean-Gaspard Páleníček, Piano sonata, tr. for symphonic orchestra (2010)
- Salem al Fakir, Good Song, tr. for mixed choir and symphonic orchestra (2010)
- Adeste Fideles, tr. for mixed choir and symphonic orchestra (2010)
- Anton Bruckner, 1st movement of the 9th Symphony, tr. for brass ensemble and organ (2011)
- Anton Bruckner, Adagio of the 8th Symphony, tr. for brass ensemble and organ (2011)
- L. van Beethoven, Scherzo of the 3rd Symphony, tr. for instrumental ensemble (2014)
- I. Stravinsky: Infernal Dance from the Firebird, tr. for instrumental ensemble (2015)
- Václav Krahulík, Etude – Toccata, tr. for instrumental ensemble (2016)
- František Škroup: Kde domov můj?, tr. for soli, mixed choir and symphonic orchestra (2017)
- Johann Sebastian Bach, Chaconne BWV 1004, tr. for brass ensemble (2018)
- Johann Sebastian Bach, Pièce d'Orgue in G major BWV 572, tr. for piano (2019)
- Hymn to Blessed Hroznata, arr. for voice and organ (2019)
- Josef Leopold Zvonař, On our Foreheads We Fall, tr. for brass ensemble and organ (2019)
