= StarDance (Czech TV series) season 9 =

Season of television series

StarDance
- Season 9
- Celebrity winner: Jiří Dvořák
- Professional winner: Lenka Nora Návorková
- No. of episodes: 10

Release
- Original network: Česká televize
- Original release: October 13 – December 15, 2018

Season chronology
- ← Previous; Season 8 Next → Season 10

The 9th StarDance series was premiered on October 13, 2018, and ended on December 15, 2018. Hosts in this series are again Marek Eben and Tereza Kostková. Jury Jan Révai was replaced by Václav Kuneš.

== Couples ==
The ten professionals and celebrities that competed were:

Celebrity	Occupation / Known for	Professional partner	Status	Ref.
Monika Bagárová	Singer	Robin Ondráček	Eliminated 1st on October 20, 2018	
Daniela Šinkorová	Actress, singer	Michal Padevět	Eliminated 2nd on October 27, 2018	
Adam Mišík	Singer	Kateřina Krakowková	Eliminated 3rd on November 3, 2018	
Richard Genzer	Actor, comedian	Jana Zelenková	Eliminated 4th on November 10, 2018	
Dalibor Gondík	Presenter	Alice Stodůlková	Eliminated 5th on November 17, 2018	
Daniela Písařovicová	News presenter	Michal Mládek	Eliminated 6th on December 1, 2018	
Veronika Arichteva	Actress	Michal Necpál	Eliminated 7th on December 8, 2018	
David Svoboda	Modern pentathlon	Veronika Lálová	Third place on December 15, 2018	
Pavla Tomicová	Actress	Marek Dědík	Runner-up on December 15, 2018	
Jiří Dvořák	Actor	Lenka Nora Návorková	Winner on December 15, 2018	

== Scoring Chart ==
Couples	Place	1	2	3	4	5	6	7	8	9	10
Jiří & Lenka	1	23	32	38	29+1=30	36	40	34	33+37=70	32+38=70	39+39+37=115
Pavla & Marek	2	23	25	37	25+1=26	25	24	40	25+39=64	28+29=57	36+37+40=113
David & Veronika L.	3	25	33	28	37+1=38	36	34	37	28+33=61	35+38=73	35+35+33=103
Veronika A. & Michal N.	4	16	27	27	27+0=27	39	34	39	29+33=62	38+34=72	
Daniela P. & Michal M.	5	19	27	26	26+0=26	31	30	34	29+30=59		
Dalibor & Alice	6	20	36	28	24+0=24	28	27				
Richard & Jana	7	25	26	38	30+0=30	33					
Adam & Kateřina	8	19	22	28	25+1=26						
Daniela Š. & Michal P.	9	28	34	34							
Monika & Robin	10	23	22								

Red numbers indicate the lowest score for each week.
Green numbers indicate the highest score for each week.
indicates the couple eliminated that week.
indicates the winning couple.
indicates the runner-up couple.
indicates the third place couple.

== Dance chart ==
The celebrities and dance partners danced one of these routines for each corresponding week:

Couple	Week 1	Week 2	Week 3	Week 4	Week 5	Week 6	Week 7	Week 8		Week 9		Week 10		
Jiří & Lenka	Cha-cha-cha	Viennese Waltz	Jive	Slowfox	Rumba	Waltz	Freestyle	Paso Doble	Quickstep	Samba	Tango	Jive	Quickstep	Freestyle
Pavla & Marek	Cha-cha-cha	Viennese Waltz	Jive	Slowfox	Rumba	Waltz	Freestyle	Quickstep	Paso Doble	Samba	Tango	Paso Doble	Viennese Waltz	Freestyle
David & Veronika L.	Waltz	Samba	Tango	Paso Doble	Quickstep	Cha-cha-cha	Freestyle	Rumba	Viennese Waltz	Jive	Slowfox	Jive	Slowfox	Freestyle
Veronika A. & Michal N.	Cha-cha-cha	Viennese Waltz	Jive	Slowfox	Rumba	Waltz	Freestyle	Quickstep	Paso Doble	Tango	Samba			
Daniela P. & Michal M.	Cha-cha-cha	Viennese Waltz	Jive	Slowfox	Rumba	Waltz	Freestyle	Paso Doble	Quickstep					
Dalibor & Alice	Waltz	Samba	Tango	Paso Doble	Quickstep	Cha-cha-cha								
Richard & Jana	Cha-cha-cha	Viennese Waltz	Jive	Slowfox	Rumba									
Adam & Kateřina	Waltz	Samba	Tango	Paso Doble										
Daniela Š. & Michal P.	Waltz	Samba	Tango											
Monika & Robin	Waltz	Samba												

Highest scoring dance
Lowest scoring dance
