= Vrané nad Vltavou =

- Municipality
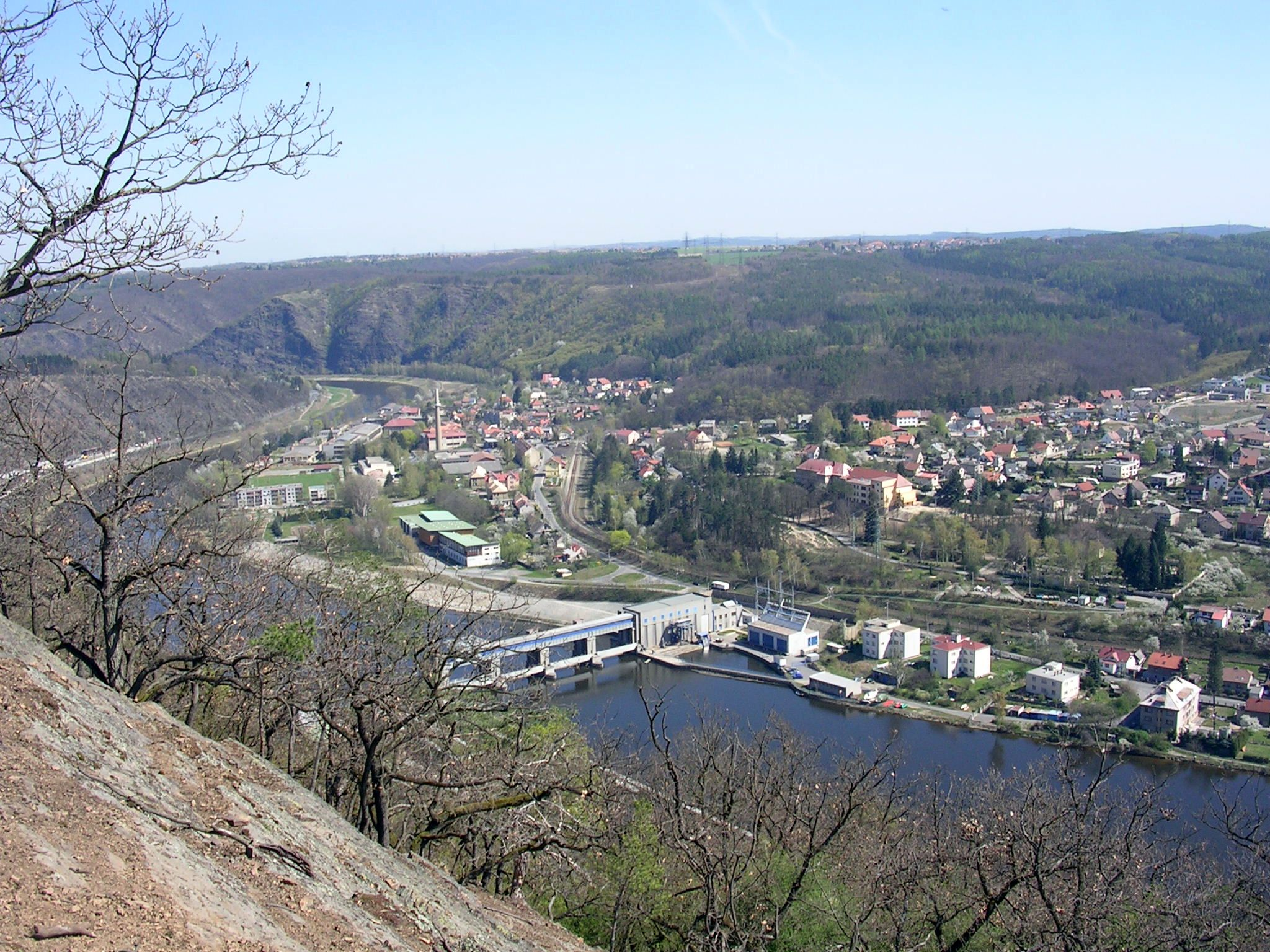
- Northeastern part of the municipality

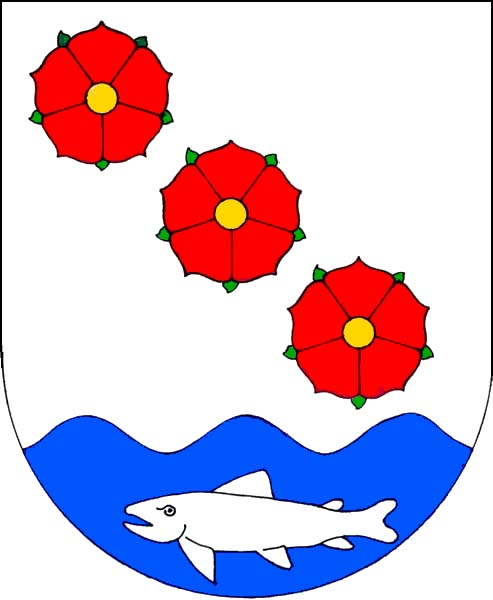
- Flag Coat of arms

- Location in the Czech Republic
- Coordinates: 49°56′9″N 14°22′38″E
- Country: Czech Republic
- Region: Central Bohemian
- District: Prague-West
- First mentioned: 993

Area
  - Total: 4.26 km^{2} (1.64 sq mi)
- Elevation: 196 m (643 ft)

Population (2026-01-01)
  - Total: 2,688
  - Density: 631/km^{2} (1,630/sq mi)
- Time zone: UTC+1 (CET)
  - Summer (DST): UTC+2 (CEST)
- Postal code: 252 46
- Website: www.vranenadvltavou.cz

Vrané nad Vltavou is a municipality and village in Prague-West District in the Central Bohemian Region of the Czech Republic. It has about 2,700 inhabitants.

== Etymology ==
The initial name of the village was Vraný (i.e. 'black' in old Czech). The name was derived either from the personal name Vraný or from a name of a forest that was called Vraný les ('black forest').

== Geography ==
Vrané nad Vltavou is located about 8 kilometres (5 mi) south of Prague. It lies in the Prague Plateau. The highest point is the hill Chlumík with an elevation of 348 m (1,142 ft). The municipality is situated on the right bank of the Vltava River.

== History ==
The first written mention of Vrané nad Vltavou (until the 19th century known as Vraný) and Skochovice (originally a separate village, today an integral part of Vrané nad Vltavou) is in the founding deed of the Břevnov Monastery from 993. Both villages were purchased by the Zbraslav Monastery in 1407. The Veitmile family bought the villages in the second half of the 15th century, but their properties were confiscated after the Battle of White Mountain, and Zbraslav Monastery acquired the two villages again. In 1785, the monastery was abolished and the villages were managed by a religious fund until the establishment of an independent municipality.

== Demographics ==
Historical population

Year	Pop.	±%
1869	889	—
1880	713	−19.8%
1890	819	+14.9%
1900	890	+8.7%
1910	897	+0.8%

Year	Pop.	±%
1921	967	+7.8%
1930	1,320	+36.5%
1950	1,598	+21.1%
1961	1,734	+8.5%
1970	1,732	−0.1%

Year	Pop.	±%
1980	1,689	−2.5%
1991	1,577	−6.6%
2001	1,794	+13.8%
2011	2,462	+37.2%
2021	2,754	+11.9%

Source: Censuses

== Transport ==
Vrané nad Vltavou is located on the railway lines Prague–Dobříš and Prague–Čerčany.

== Sights ==
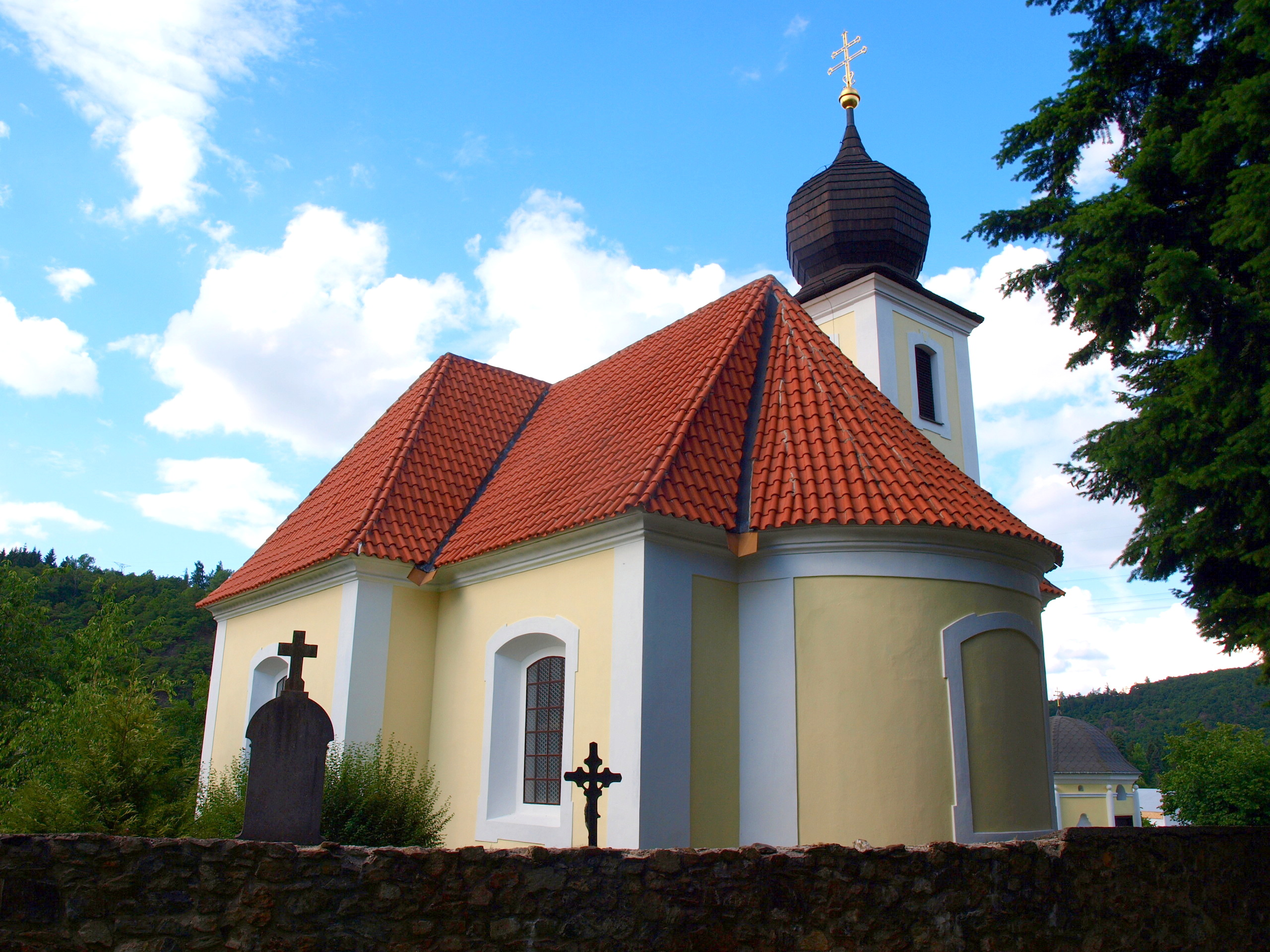
Church of Saint George

The main landmark of Vrané nad Vltavou is the Church of Saint George. It was first mentioned in 1352. In the mid-17th century, it was rebuilt in the Baroque style and significantly expanded. The main altar is Baroque and is decorated with an image of St. George slaying a dragon.

== Notable people ==
- Jaromír Vejvoda (1902–1988), composer; lived here in 1936–1960
