= The Territory of White Deer =

Czechoslovak television series

- Written by: Jiří Melíšek, Josef Skácel
- Directed by: Ludvík Ráža
- Starring: Lukáš Jenčík; Zuzana Vejvodová; Petr Čech; Robert Ježek
- Music by: Petr Hapka
- Original language: Czech

Production
- Producers: Československá televize, Ravensburger Film
- Cinematography: Ervín Sanders
- Running time: 7 x 51 min.

Original release
- Release: 1991

The Territory of White Deer (Czech: Území bílých králů, German: Das Geheimnis der weißen Hirsche) is a Czechoslovak TV series.

The series was screened on Czechoslovak Television, on German ZDF, Super RTL and Kinderkanal and several times on Czech Television as well.

== Plot ==
The story centers around a group of children, led by Leontinka (Zuzana Vejvodová) and Olda (Lukáš Jenčík). Father of Leontinka (Jan Kanyza) manages the local Deer Park with an invaluable breed of white deer. A series of mysterious events unfolds, threatening the deer. Leontinka and Olda, who is in turn a son of a local police officer (Pavel Zedníček), search for the villain. The list of suspects includes young fugitive (Michal Suchánek), former head of the deer park (Martin Růžek), former poacher (Jiří Sovák), manager of local restaurant (Oldřich Vlach), designer planning a motorway (Miroslav Etzler) and a couple of others. Stella Zázvorková performed a local widow, as well as Jana Hlaváčová, who works hard to repay financial debt the manager of restaurant. Ondřej Vetchý performed a lover of local teacher. Some parts of the story were narrated by Viktor Preiss (voiceover).

== Episodes ==
1. The Fugitive (Uprchlík)
2. The Wildfire (Požár)
3. The Secret Tunnel (Tajná chodba)
4. The Poisoned Water (Otrávená voda)
5. The Trip (Výlet)
6. The New Forest (Nový les)
7. The Capture (Dopadení)

== Cast ==
- Leontina Bajerová .... Zuzana Vejvodová
- Olda .... Lukáš Jenčík
- Honza .... Petr Čech
- Pepa .... Robert Ježek
- Mr. Bajer .... Jan Kanyza
- Mr. Klepetka .... Pavel Zedníček
- ??? .... Michal Suchánek
- Mr. Louš .... Martin Růžek
- Mr. Roušar .... Jiří Sovák
- Mrs. Kabátová .... Jana Hlaváčová
- Teacher Arnošt .... Ondřej Vetchý
- Narrator .... Viktor Preiss
- Jaromír .... ???
- Tractor Driver .... Vlastmil Bedrna
- Waiter Kabát .... Oldřich Vlach
- Mrs. Klepetková .... Dagmar Veškrnová-Havlová
- Mr. Vašut .... Miroslav Etzler
- Mrs. Javorská .... Simona Postlerová
- Franta .... Blažej Svoboda
- Eliška .... Adéla Stodolová
- Helena .... Nora Kurzová
- Mrs. Hlavíková .... Stella Zázvorková
- Mr. Horáček .... Tomáš Valík
- Mr. Verner .... Martin Zounar
- Eva .... Miroslava Součková
- Imre .... Miroslav Heyduk

== Filming locations ==
Filming location included South Bohemian town Třeboň and Deer Park Žehušice near Kutná Hora.
