= In Search of Janáček =

2003 television film

- Written by: Petr Kaňka
- Directed by: Petr Kaňka
- Starring: Hanuš Bor; Ilona Svobodová; Zuzana Vejvodová; Jan Hartl
- Theme music composer: Leoš Janáček
- Original language: Czech

Production
- Producer: Petr Nezval (Czech Television)
- Cinematography: Antonín Chundela
- Editor: Vasil Skalenakis
- Running time: 57 minutes

Original release
- Release: March 2003

In Search of Janáček (Czech: Hledání Janáčka) is a film about the life of composer Leoš Janáček.

The film, written and directed by Petr Kaňka, received Special Mention at the International Television Festival Golden Prague in 2003. It was released in 2004 to celebrate the 150th anniversary of the composer. The director combined archive footage and contemporary stagings.

== Content ==
The film reflects the complicated character of Janáček (performed by Hanuš Bor), his work and his relationship with his wife (Ilona Svobodová) and his mistress Kamila Stösslová (Zuzana Vejvodová). It presents Janáček developed as a visionary of musical realism through the use of a specific musical language. The director tried to avoid any stereotypes of the composer. The film reveals his rather tough childhood, an early parting with parents and various conflicts, as well as hard work, self-education, and a desire for creation.
