= String Quartet No. 2 (Janáček) =

1928 composition

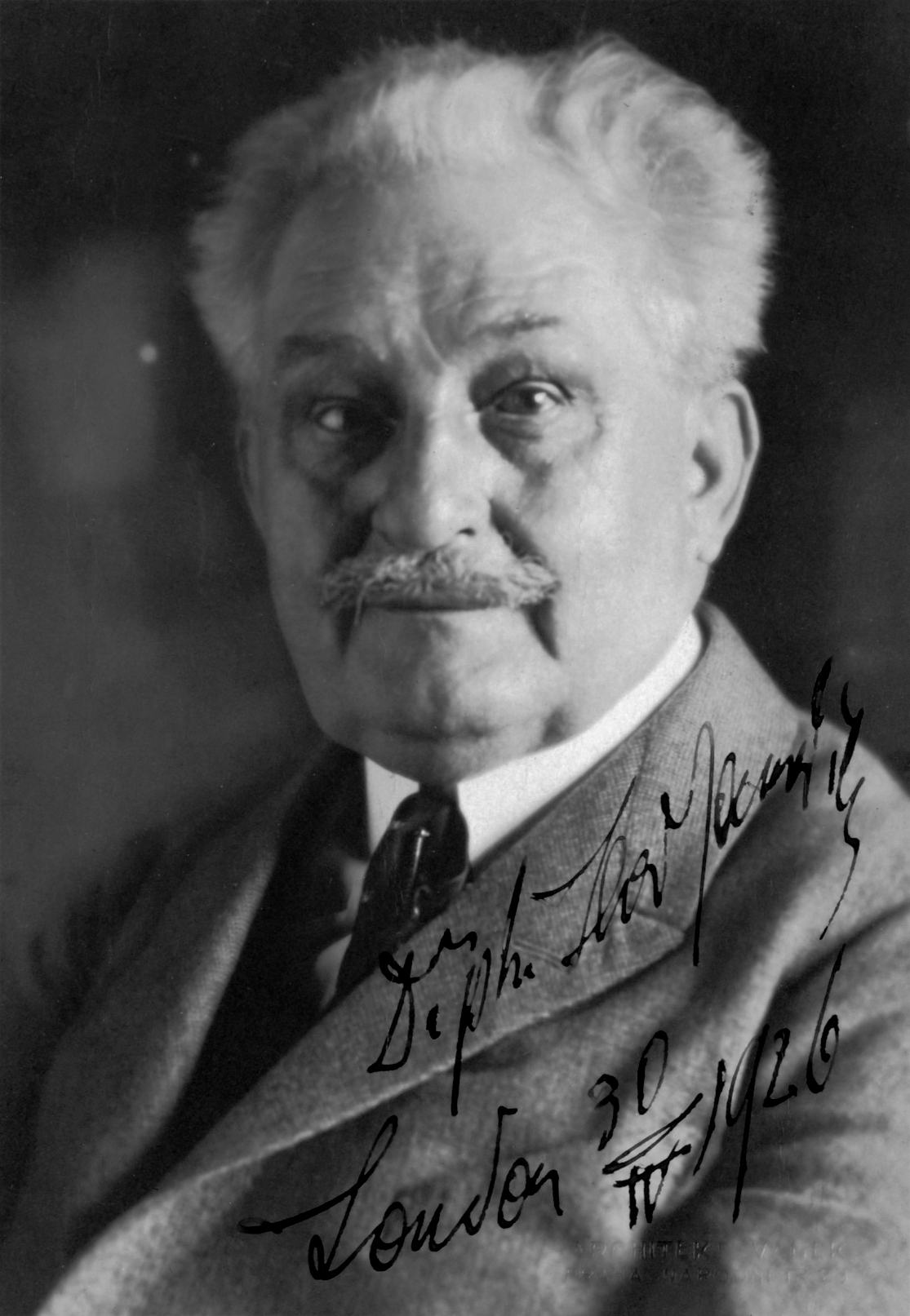
Leoš Janáček in 1926

Leoš Janáček's String Quartet No. 2 "Intimate Letters" was written in 1928. It was inspired by his long and spiritual friendship with Kamila Stösslová, a married woman 38 years his junior. It has been referred to as Janáček's "manifesto on love".

== Background ==
The "Intimate Letters" quartet was the second quartet to be composed on a commission from the Bohemian Quartet who, in 1923, had asked Janáček to compose two string quartets for them. The first of these was his "Kreutzer Sonata" quartet.

The title "Intimate Letters" ("Listy důvěrné" in Czech) was given by the composer himself. The composition was intended to reflect the character of his relationship with Kamila Stösslová, who was forty years younger than the composer, and with whom he exchanged more than 700 letters during the course of their relationship. He wrote to her in one of these letters:

"I'm curious how my 'Intimate Letters' will work. It's my first composition whose notes glow with all the dear things that we've experienced together. You stand behind every note, you, living, forceful, loving. The fragrance of your body, the glow of your kisses – no, really of mine. Those notes of mine kiss all of you. They call for you passionately."

The inspiration for the quartet, which was originally entitled Listy milostné, or Love Letters, was their first kiss at Luhacovice on August 19, 1927. Not only is the work dedicated to Stösslová, but the composer added a codicil to his will stipulating that she receive all of the royalties. Another important influence on the quartet is Zdeněk Fibich's monumental piano cycle Nálady, dojmy a upominky (Moods, Impressions and Reminiscences). This ambitious work of 376 pieces chronicles the romance between Fibich and his beloved muse Anezka Schulzová. Janáček, in a letter quoted by Josephson, compared his relationship with Stösslová to Fibich's, and vowed to embody her in the music of his quartet.

The première of the work took place on 11 September 1928, a month after Janáček died. The composition was performed by the Moravian Quartet.

== Structure ==
It consists of four movements:

1. Andante – Con moto – Allegro
2. Adagio – Vivace
3. Moderato –Andante – Adagio
4. Allegro – Andante –Adagio

The viola assumes a prominent role throughout the composition, as this instrument is intended to personify Kamila. The viola part was originally written for a viola d'amore, however the conventional viola was substituted when Janáček found the viola d'amore did not match the texture. Milan Škampa of the Smetana Quartet has interpreted the third "letter", or movement, as a lullaby for the son that Janáček and Kamila Stösslová never had together.

The work is essentially tonal albeit not in the traditional sense. For example, the work closes with six D♭ major chords (Janáček's favourite chord), but with the added dissonance of an E♭.
