= Kamila Stösslová =

Czech housewife

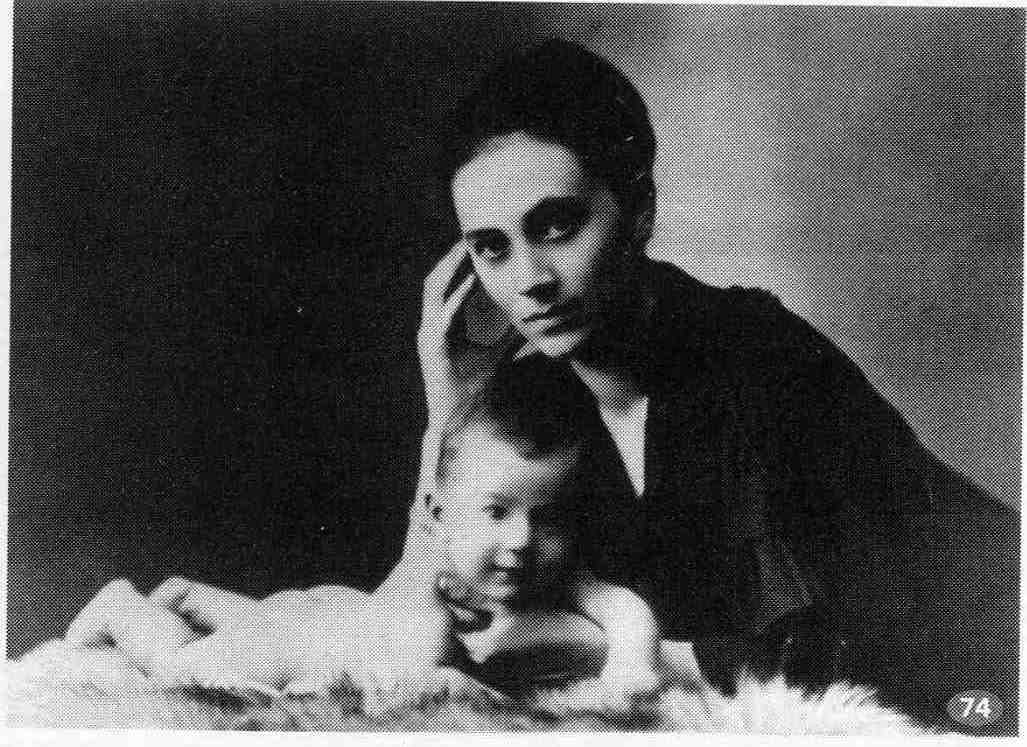
Kamila Stösslová with her son Otto in 1917

Kamila Stösslová (née Neumannová; 1891–1935) was a Czech woman. The composer Leoš Janáček, upon meeting her in 1917 in the Moravian resort town of Luhačovice, fell deeply in love with her, despite the fact that both of them were married, and that he was almost forty years older than she was. She had a profound influence on the composer in his last decade.

Kamila was at the time living in Luhačovice with her husband, David Stössel, and their two sons, Rudolf (born 1913) and Otto (born 1916). David was in the army, and assisted Janáček in obtaining vital food supplies in wartime. David Stössel's army service may have meant he could be at Luhačovice only on some days, thus giving Janáček opportunities to converse with Kamila. Janáček arrived in the resort on 3 July 1917 (he preferred Luhačovice over other spas due to its proximity to his house in Brno). By 8 July he had jotted down a fragment of her speech in his diary. His correspondence with Kamila had begun with a brief note by 24 July 1917.

Despite her ambivalence about his feelings for her, Janáček was inspired by her to create the lead characters of two of his operas: Káťa in Katya Kabanová and Emilia Marty in The Makropulos Affair. He acknowledged her as the inspiration for the former opera, telling her in a letter that "I saw for the first time how a woman can love her husband… that was the reason why I took up Kát’a Kabanová and composed it". Likewise, during rehearsals for The Makropulos Affair, Janáček wrote to her that "Mrs. Kerová, who is taking [the role of Emilia Marty], has movements like you… that lady seems just like you in her gait and her whole appearance".

Another work inspired by Stösslová was The Diary of One Who Disappeared about which the composer wrote to her: "That black Gypsy girl in my Diary was especially you… That's why there's so much emotional heat". Other works she inspired include the Glagolitic Mass, the Sinfonietta, and in particular the String Quartet No. 2 (subtitled Intimate Letters). Not only is this last work dedicated to Stösslová, but the composer added a codicil to his will stipulating that she receive all of the royalties.

While many of these works reveal a realization by the composer that his love for her was unrequited, she was nonetheless the subject of intense correspondence. There are over 700 letters that bear witness to his intense obsession with Kamila. During the final year of his life, he wrote to Kamila almost every day. Although she always remained emotionally aloof, she was with him when he died in 1928.

In the award-winning TV film In Search of Janáček, written and directed by Petr Kaňka, her character was performed by Zuzana Vejvodová.
