= Deer Park Žehušice =

Protected area in the Czech Republic

Coordinates: 49°57′43.304″N 15°25′34.696″E

Deer Park Žehušice (Czech: Žehušická obora) is a nature monument in the municipal territory of Žehušice in the Central Bohemian Region of the Czech Republic.

== Location ==
The deer park is located about 15 kilometres (9 mi) east of Kutná Hora.

== History ==
Deer Park Žehušice was founded by the Thun-Hohenstein family in 1867.

In 1826, Count Matthias Thun-Hohenstein decided to drain the fish pond Kravinec located behind Žehušice Castle and to build a fence around the area. A park consisting of meadows and groves, covering about 2.5 km², was created. Four years later, Matthias obtained several white deer from Count Kinsky from Chlumec nad Cidlinou. The origin of the deer is disputed but the species were likely either from India or Persia. The particular breed was short-lived and the herds held at the same time by Counts Kinsky, Czernin and Schwarzenberg were on the verge of dying out. However, the herd in Žehušice has been bred continually.

The owners failed to obtain new white deer to introduce fresh blood into the Žehušice line. Therefore a red deer from a nearby park was selected and let in the reserve. This method of renewing the blood line worked but the result of mixing genes for colour remained quite unpredictable. As expected, some of the fawns were rust-colored but even a pair of rust-colored deer sometimes gave birth to a white fawn. Currently there are approximately 130 animals, including those with standard and transient colouring.

Today the deer park is privately owned and not accessible to visitors.

== In popular culture ==
In 1990, a TV series The Territory of White Deer was filmed there.
