= Žehušice =

- Market town
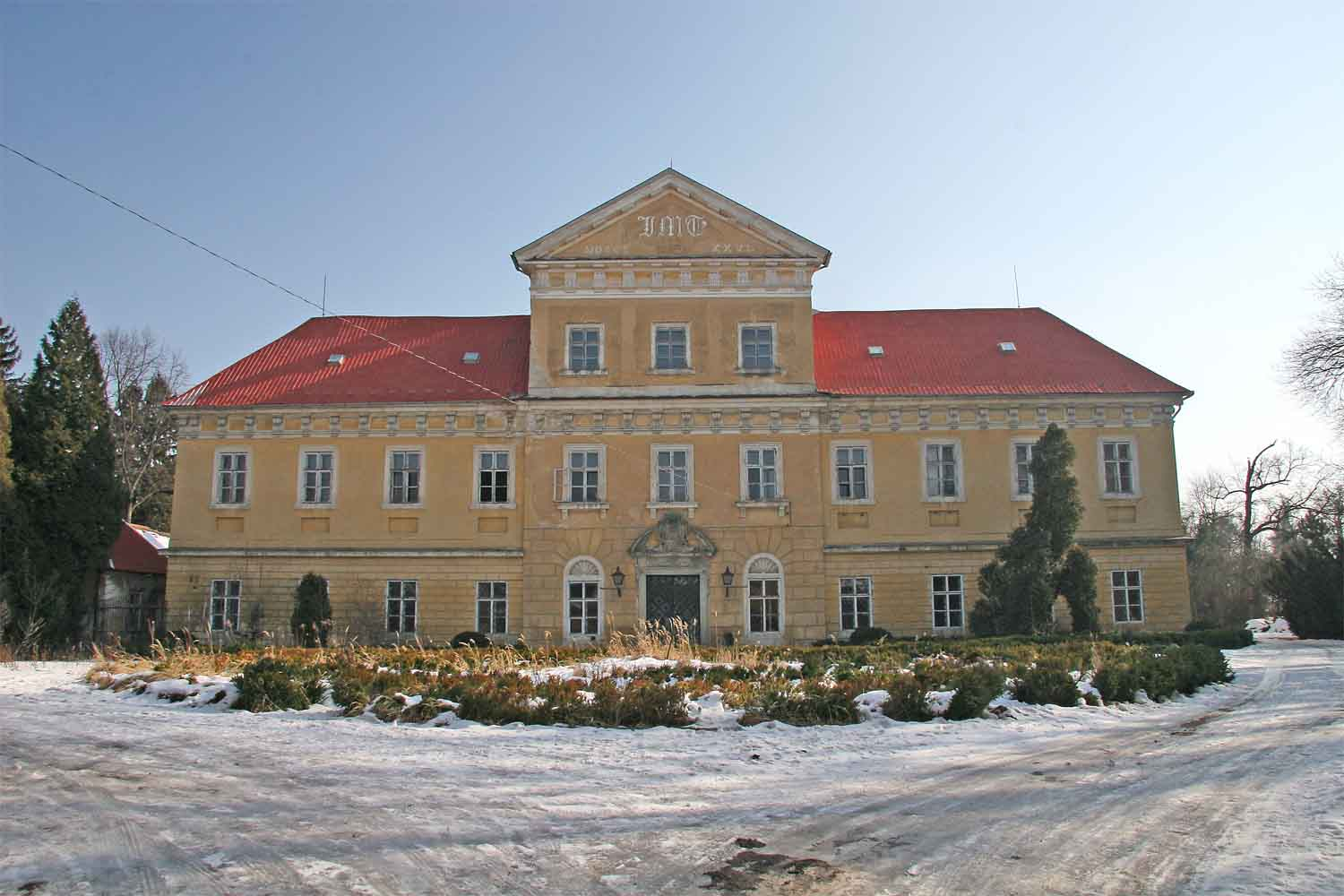
- Žehušice Castle

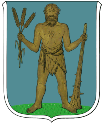
- Coat of arms

- Location in the Czech Republic
- Coordinates: 49°58′10″N 15°24′27″E
- Country: Czech Republic
- Region: Central Bohemian
- District: Kutná Hora
- First mentioned: 1350

Area
  - Total: 8.95 km^{2} (3.46 sq mi)
- Elevation: 220 m (720 ft)

Population (2026-01-01)
  - Total: 905
  - Density: 101/km^{2} (262/sq mi)
- Time zone: UTC+1 (CET)
  - Summer (DST): UTC+2 (CEST)
- Postal code: 285 75
- Website: www.mestyszehusice.cz

Žehušice (Czech pronunciation: [ˈʒɛɦuʃɪtsɛ]) is a market town in Kutná Hora District in the Central Bohemian Region of the Czech Republic. It has about 900 inhabitants.

== Administrative division ==
Žehušice consists of two municipal parts (in brackets population according to the 2021 census):

- Žehušice (755)
- Bojmany (83)

== Etymology ==
The name is derived from the personal name Žehuš, meaning "the village of Žehuš's people".

== Geography ==
Žehušice is located about 8 kilometres (5 mi) east of Kutná Hora and 26 km (16 mi) west of Pardubice. It lies in a flat agricultural landscape in the Central Elbe Table. The market town is situated on the left bank of the Doubrava River, at the confluence of the Doubrava with the Brslenka Stream.

== History ==
The first written mention of Žehušice is from 1350. The village was promoted to a market town in 1540 by Emperor Ferdinand I, but it lost this title in 1601. From 1661 to 1918, Žehušice was owned by the Thun und Hohenstein family. In 1865, Žehušice was once again promoted to a market town.

== Demographics ==
Historical population

Year	Pop.	±%
1869	1,332	—
1880	1,243	−6.7%
1890	1,252	+0.7%
1900	1,174	−6.2%
1910	1,066	−9.2%

Year	Pop.	±%
1921	1,061	−0.5%
1930	953	−10.2%
1950	765	−19.7%
1961	767	+0.3%
1970	698	−9.0%

Year	Pop.	±%
1980	609	−12.8%
1991	582	−4.4%
2001	578	−0.7%
2011	669	+15.7%
2021	838	+25.3%

Source: Censuses

== Transport ==
There are no railways or major roads passing through the municipality.

== Sights ==
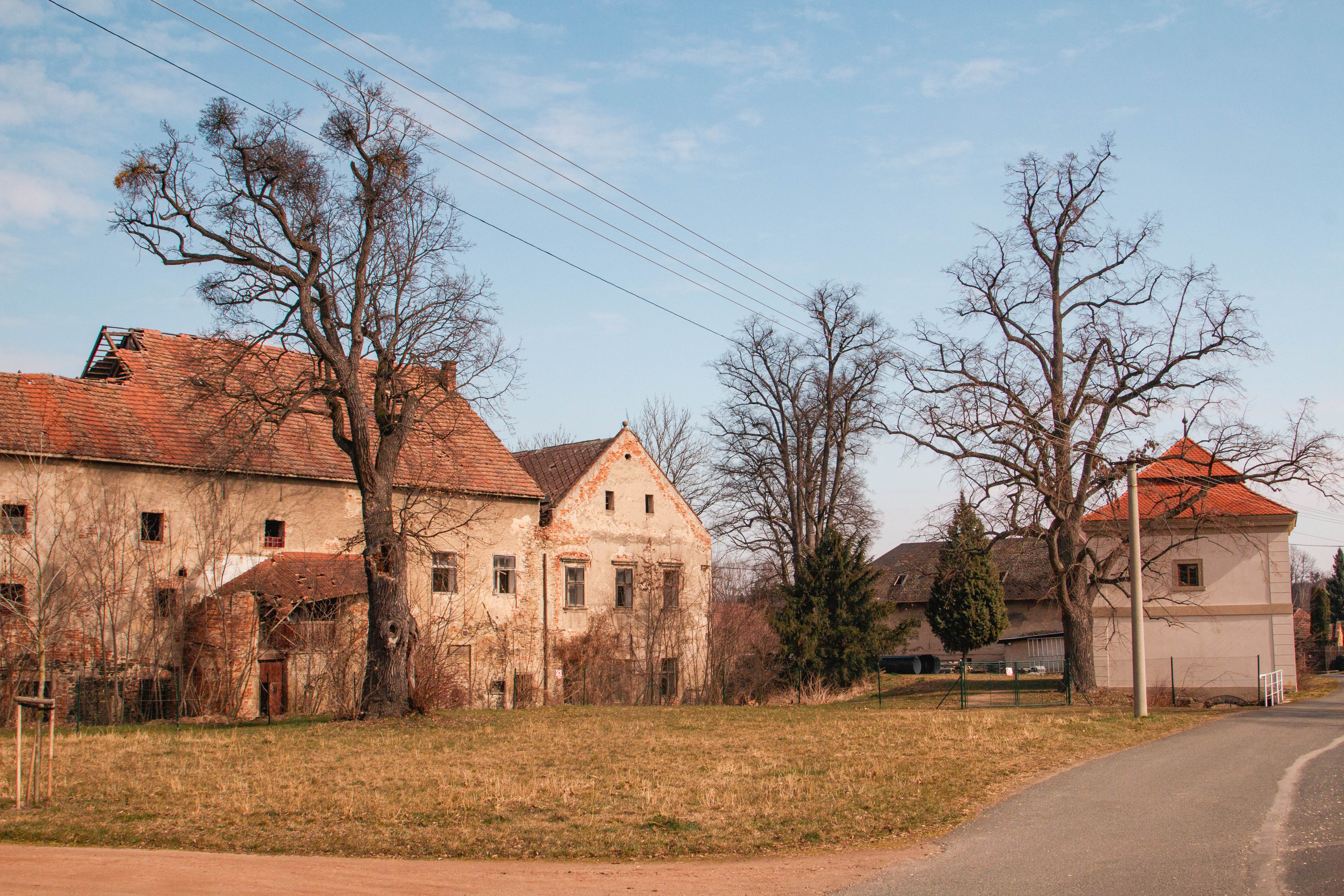
Starý zámek

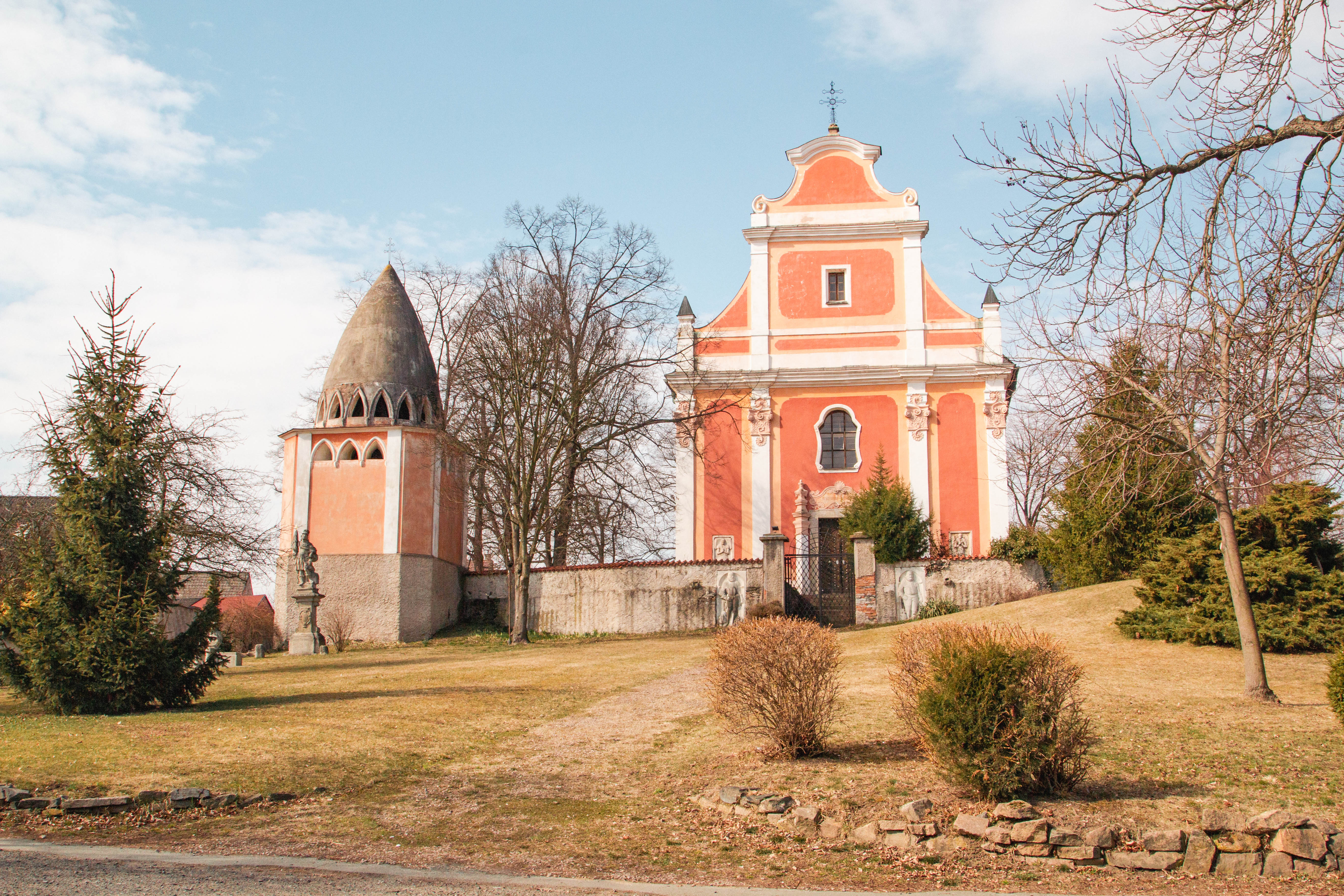
Church of Saint Mark and bell tower

Žehušice is known for the Deer Park Žehušice. It is a 270 hectares (670 acres) large deer park, founded by the Thun und Hohenstein family in 1867. Among other animals, a rare herd of white stags is kept in it. Today it is protected as a nature monument. The deer park is privately owned and is closed to the public. The landscape around Žehušice, including the deer park and the castle park of the nearby Kačina Castle, is protected as a landscape monument zone, because it is a uniquely preserved document of Baroque urbanism and a Baroque composed landscape.

The Žehušice Castle is located next to the deer park. It is an early Baroque castle whose construction was completed in 1679. In 1826, it was rebuilt in the Empire style. A castle park is adjacent to the castle.

A notable building is the former Renaissance fortress, also called Starý zámek ('old castle'). In addition to its historical value, it is known as the birthplace of Giovanni Punto. Today the building is dilapidated and unused.

The Church of Saint Mark belongs to the main landmarks of Žehušice. It was built in the Baroque style in 1760. Next to the church is an atypical separate bell tower, built in the Moorish style.

== Notable people ==
- Giovanni Punto (1746–1803), horn player
