= Divadlo na Fidlovačce =

Theatre company in the Czech Republic

Fidlovačka Theatre
- Divadlo na Fidlovačce

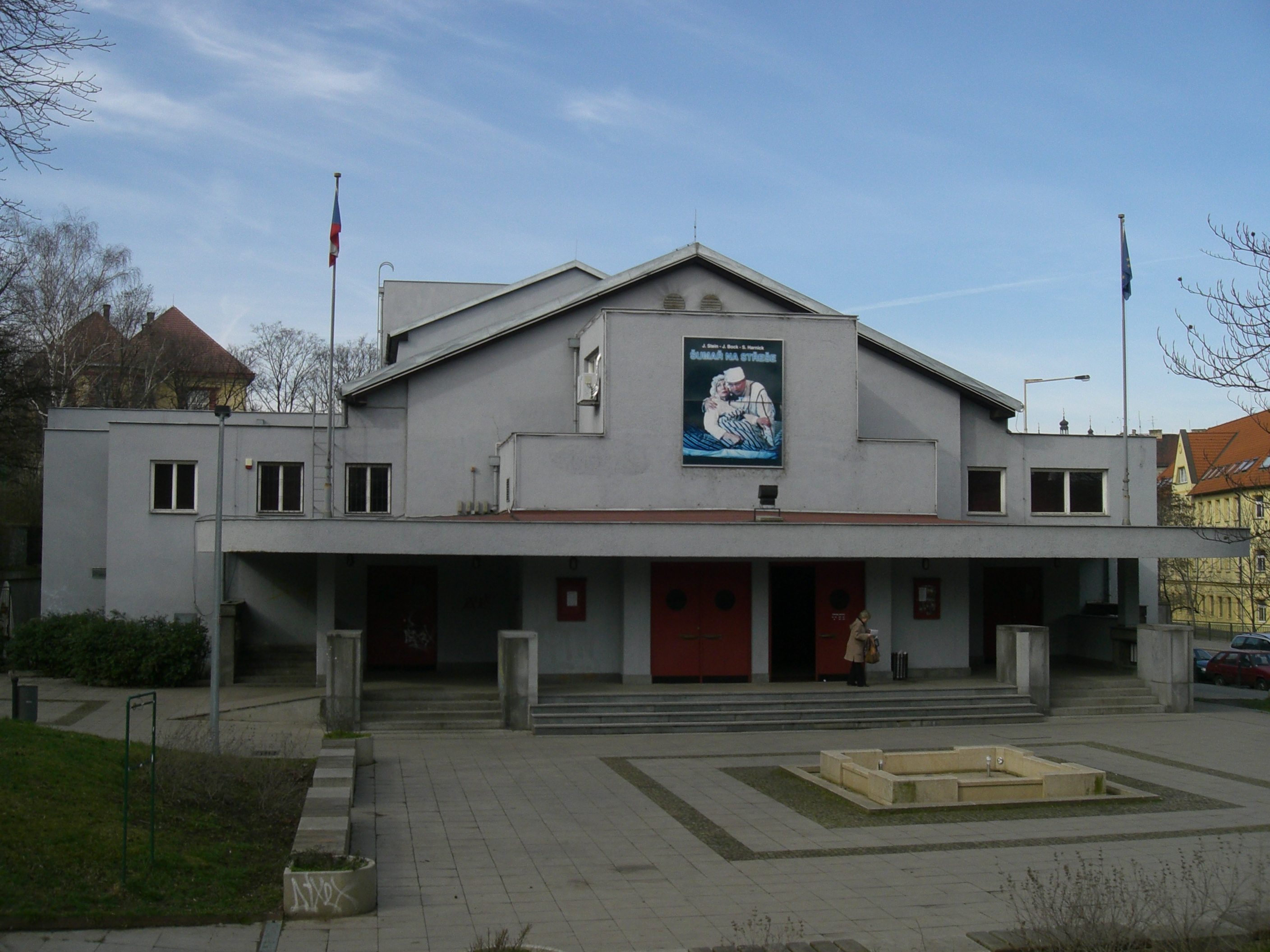
- Main entrance to the theatre.
- Interactive map of Fidlovačka Theatre
- Address: Křesomyslova 625/4; Prague 4 Czech Republic
- Coordinates: 50°3′52.42″N 14°26′8.72″E

Construction
- Opened: 1921, 1998

Website
- Official website

Divadlo na Fidlovačce (Fidlovačka Theatre) is a private theatre based in Prague.

The theatre is in a building located in Nusle, that was built as Thyl Theatre in 1921. Several ensembles performed in the theatre, that had itself several names. In 1978 the building was closed and started to deteriorate. In January 1995 the Nadace Fidlovačka foundation was established. The foundation, headed by actors Tomáš Töpfer and Eliška Balzerová, with the support of municipal government of the Prague 4 district managed to re-establish the theatre.

The theatre opened with musical Fiddler on the Roof in October 1998. The performance, with Tomáš Töpfer as Tovye, was very successful, when the run of the musical ended in 2014. Other musicals included Man of La Mancha with Viktor Preiss as Don Quixote, Painted on Glass, translated by Jaromír Nohavica, Cabaret with Tereza Bebarová as Sally Bowles and Czech premiere of Thoroughly Modern Millie with Michaela Badinková / Zuzana Vejvodová as Millie Dillmount. Large part of the repertoire, as in other Czech private theatres with limited amount of state subsidies, consist of comedies for broad audience. Among others, comedies by Shakespeare, Goldoni, Pirandello, Orton, Feydau, Patrick, Maugham or Kishon were staged. Most performances were directed by either Tomáš Töpfer or Juraj Deák, who held the position of art director. In 2006 the theatre opened as second scene in a former cinema nearby, so-called Komorní Fidlovačka, where chamber dramas for smaller audiences are held.
