= Angel of the Lord 2 =

2016 Czech fantasy comedy film

- Czech: Anděl Páně 2
- Directed by: Jiří Strach
- Written by: Marek Epstein
- Screenplay by: Jiří Strach; Marek Epstein
- Based on: Fairy tales by Božena Němcová
- Produced by: Šárka Cimbalová; Svatka Peschková
- Starring: Ivan Trojan; Jiří Dvořák
- Cinematography: Martin Šec
- Edited by: Jan Matlach
- Music by: Ondřej Brzobohatý
- Production company: Marlene Film Production
- Distributed by: Falcon
- Release date: 1 December 2016
- Running time: 99 minutes
- Country: Czech Republic
- Language: Czech
- Budget: 30 Million CZK
- Box office: US$4.9 million

Angel of the Lord 2 (Czech: Anděl Páně 2) is a 2016 Czech fantasy comedy film directed by Jiří Strach. The movie is available on Voyo.cz with Czech audio. It is a sequel to Strach's 2005 film, Angel of the Lord.

== Plot ==
It is Saint Nicholas Day, and angel Petronel still works at the gates of Heaven. He believes he is entitled to a better post, however. His old accomplice, the devil Uriáš, tempts him to pick an apple from the tree of knowledge. As the two argue, the precious fruit falls to Earth, and God sends the inept duo down to retrieve it. On Earth, they meet little Anežka and her beautiful mother, a crew of deceitful carolers, the greedy Košťál, and a likeable sausage seller. Before they can find the apple and bring it back to Heaven, the two are subjected to an adventure that involves a number of perils.

== Cast and characters ==
- Ivan Trojan as angel Petronel
- Jiří Dvořák as devil Uriáš
- Vica Kerekes as the widow Magdalena
- Anna Čtvrtníčková as Anežka
- Viktor Preiss as judge
- Pavel Liška as fake devil
- Stanislav Majer as fake Saint Nicholas
- Marek Taclík as fake angel
- Vojtěch Dyk as sausage seller
- Marián Labuda as confectioner
- Jiří Bartoška as God
- Klára Issová as the Virgin Mary
- Bolek Polívka as tailor Košťál
- Viktor Antonio as Jesus
- Josef Abrhám as Saint Joseph
- Jiří Pecha as Saint Nicholas
- Veronika Žilková as Saint Veronica
- Martin Huba as Saint Martin
- Petr Čtvrtníček as Saint Peter
- Gabriela Osvaldová as Archangel Gabriel
- Michal Horáček as Archangel Michael
- Matěj Hádek as Saint Matthias
- Lucie Bílá as Saint Lucy
- Boni Pueri as angels
- Jiřina Bohdalová as the soul of Mrs. Voříšková
- Roman Luknár as the soul of King Herodes

== Reception ==
Angel of the Lord 2 reached number one on its opening weekend in the Czech Republic, with US$0.99 million. The film broke the box office record for a Czech film at US$4.9 million as of 6 February 2017.

== See also ==
- List of films about angels
