= Miřetice (Chrudim District) =

- Municipality
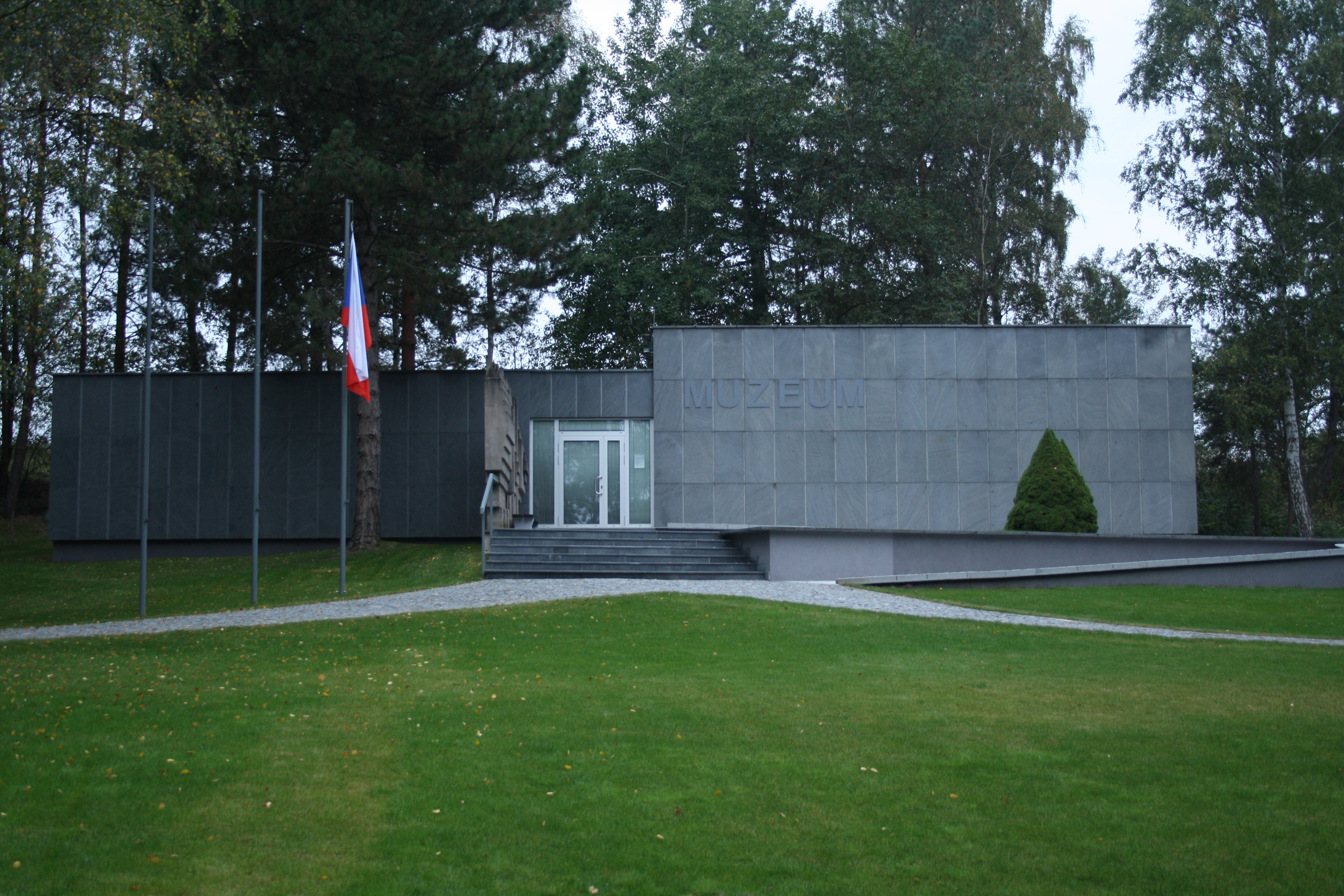
- Museum of Ležáky

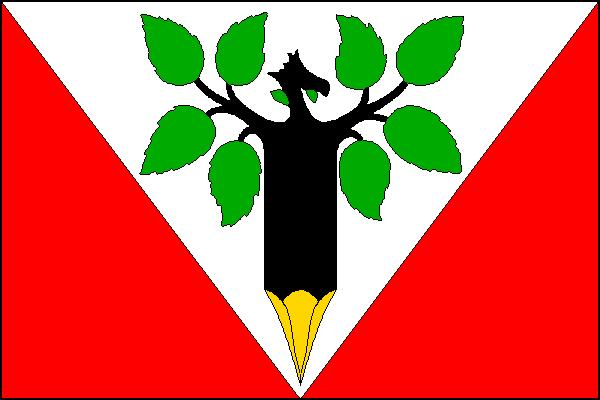
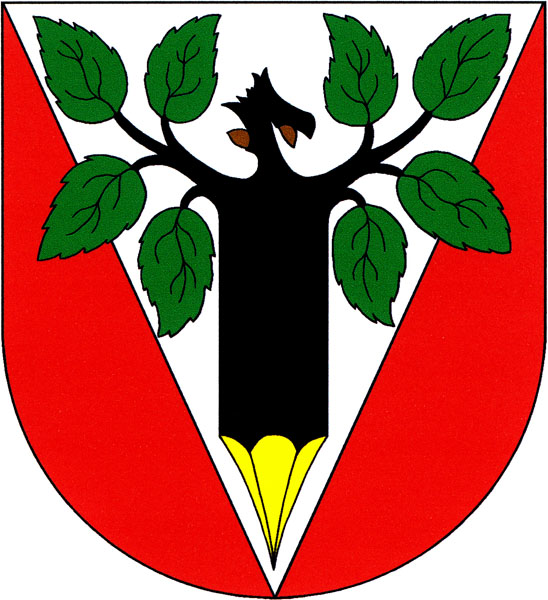
- Flag Coat of arms

- Location in the Czech Republic
- Coordinates: 49°50′30″N 15°53′8″E
- Country: Czech Republic
- Region: Pardubice
- District: Chrudim
- First mentioned: 1325

Area
  - Total: 17.14 km^{2} (6.62 sq mi)
- Elevation: 456 m (1,496 ft)

Population (2026-01-01)
  - Total: 1,286
  - Density: 75.03/km^{2} (194.3/sq mi)
- Time zone: UTC+1 (CET)
  - Summer (DST): UTC+2 (CEST)
- Postal code: 538 04
- Website: www.miretice.cz

Miřetice is a municipality and village in Chrudim District in the Pardubice Region of the Czech Republic. It has about 1,300 inhabitants.

== Administrative division ==
Miřetice consists of eight municipal parts (in brackets population according to the 2021 census):

- Miřetice (578)
- Bošov (131)
- Čekov (94)
- Dachov (199)
- Dubová (70)
- Havlovice (35)
- Krupín (71)
- Švihov (90)

== Demographics ==
Historical population
Year	Pop.	±%
1869	1,774	—
1880	1,745	−1.6%
1890	1,732	−0.7%
1900	1,893	+9.3%
1910	1,934	+2.2%
1921	1,891	−2.2%
1930	1,975	+4.4%
1950	1,460	−26.1%
1961	1,460	+0.0%
1970	1,343	−8.0%
1980	1,252	−6.8%
1991	1,211	−3.3%
2001	1,220	+0.7%
2011	1,185	−2.9%
2021	1,268	+7.0%
Source: Censuses

== Sights ==
The area of the former village of Ležáky, destroyed during World War II, is part of Miřetice-Dachov. The events are commemorated in the Museum of Ležáky.
