= Viktor Preiss =

Czech actor (born 1947)

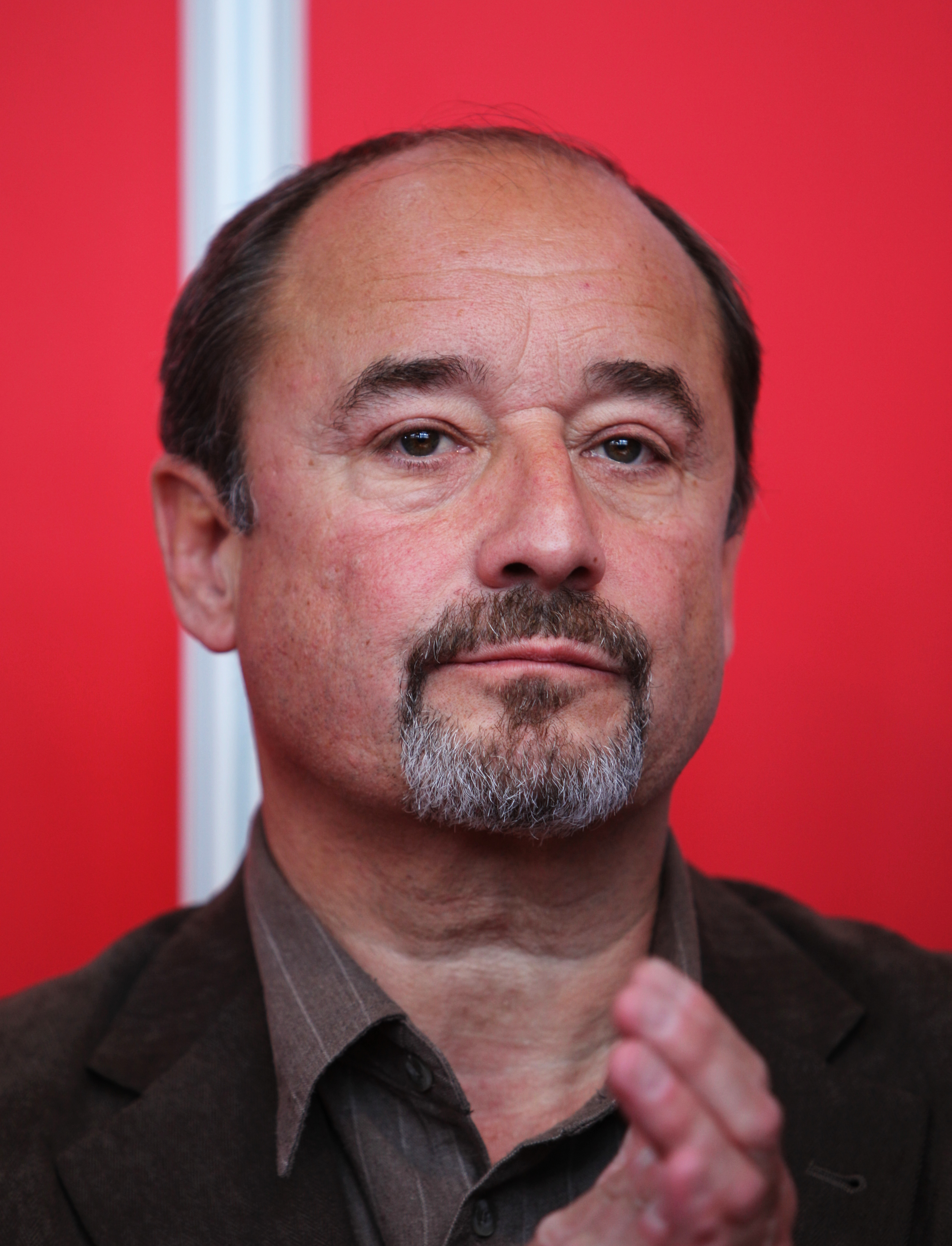
- Viktor Preiss in 2009
- Born: 13 March 1947 (age 78); Prague, Czechoslovakia
- Occupation: Actor
- Years active: 1967–present
- Spouse: Jana Preissová (m. 1969)

Viktor Preiss (born 13 March 1947 in Prague) is a Czech actor. He popularly known for his roles in Hospital at the End of the City or Give the Devil His Due. He starred in dozens of Czech films and television programs, including the film Operace Silver A under director Jiří Strach in 2007.

== Selected filmography ==
- Lovers in the Year One (1973)
- Hospital at the End of the City (1978, TV)
- Proč moskyt bzučí do lidských uší (1984)
- Give the Devil His Due (1985)
- The Territory of White Deer (1991, TV)
- Dark Blue World (2001)
- Operace Silver A (2007)
- Duch nad zlato (2013)
- Případ pro malíře (2016)
- Každý milion dobrý (2016)
- Angel of the Lord 2 (2016)
