= Alfréd Bartoš =

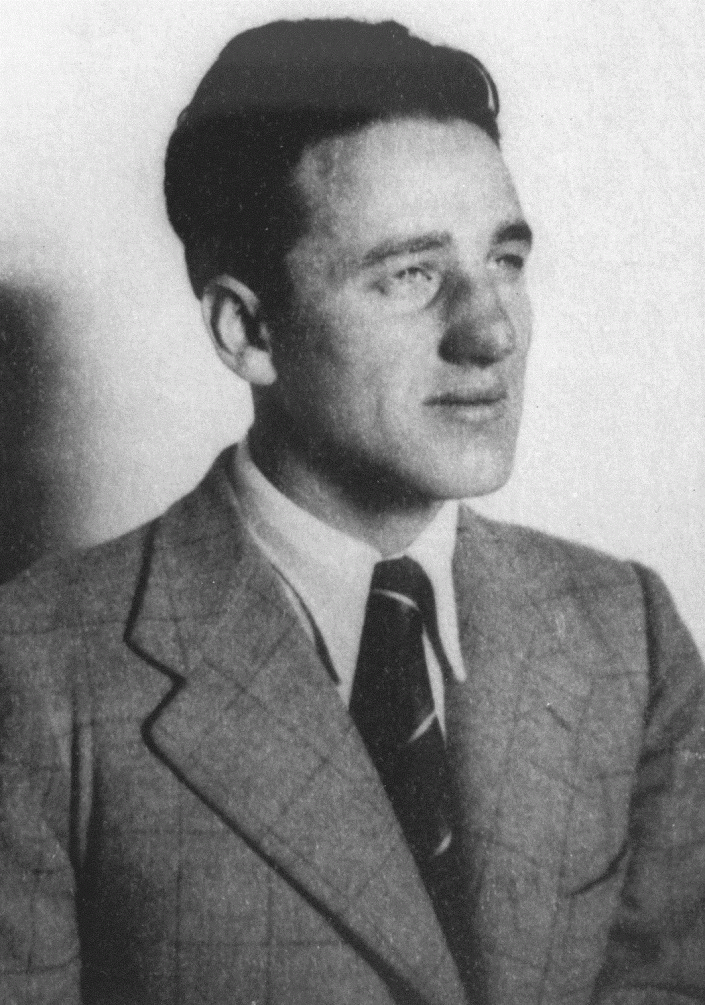
- Born: 23 September 1916; Vienna, Austria-Hungary
- Died: 22 June 1942 (aged 25); Pardubice, Protectorate of Bohemia and Moravia
- Military career
- Allegiance: Czechoslovakia; France
- Branch: Czechoslovak Army; Czechoslovak Army in-exile
- Service years: 1935–1942
- Rank: Kapitán (Captain; 1942)
- Unit: Special Operations Executive
- Conflicts: Second World War; Operation Silver A

Alfréd Bartoš (23 September 1916 – 22 June 1942) was a Czech army officer and member of the Czechoslovak anti-Nazi resistance during World War II.

== Early life ==
On 23 September 1916 Bartoš was born in Vienna to Adolf Bartoš and Antonia Bartoš. After World War I ended, they moved to Sezemice (6km from the city of Pardubice). In 1930 Bartoš graduated from middle school and continued his studies at a local high school, where he was one of the best students. He graduated in 1935, with honours.

== Military career ==
Bartoš joined the Czech military in Pardubice on 1 October 1935. He was promoted to private on 23 December and to Corporal on 25 July 1936. On 5 September 1936 he enrolled at a Military Academy in Hranice. On 29 August 1937 he graduated from the Military Academy with the rank of lieutenant cavalry. He worked at the cavalry regiment until the German occupation on 15 March 1939.

=== After occupation ===
Following the German occupation of Czechoslovakia Bartoš travelled to France, where he assisted at the Czechoslovak consulate in Paris. On 8 June, Bartoš joined the French Foreign Legion. He was serving in Tunisia, until the beginning of World War II when he returned to France. On 16 November he joined the second Czechoslovak Regiment as the Second Assistant Commander and took part in fighting on the French front. After the defeat of France he travelled to Rod el Farag, England arriving on 13 July 1940. There he became the commander of the 1st Infantry 1st Company of the 2nd Infantry Battalion. In 1941, Bartoš was nominated to be the commander of the Silver A.

== Operation Silver A ==
Operation Silver A was a military operation organized by the intelligence division of the Czechoslovak government-in-exile with the assistance of the British SOE and RAF.

The main objective of Operation Silver A was to maintain contact with England and to transmit important news about what was happening in the protectorate through a radio station.

After failed attempts on 29 October, 7 November and 30 November 1941, the three-man team (Alfréd Bartoš, Josef Valčík, Jiří Potůček) successfully landed in Czechoslovakia on 29 December. Bartoš was able to make contact with the resistance and by 15 January 1942 Potůček had established a radio link with London. In fear of the German authorities, the radio station was relocated a couple of times.

In the middle of June there began a series of arrests in the Pardubice region. The Gestapo had obtained the address of the safe house used by Bartoš. On 21 June, as Bartoš was returning to the safe house, he found out that he was being watched and attempted to leave the scene. He committed suicide by shooting himself as a result of the situation. He did not die immediately, he was taken to a hospital where he died the following day. He is buried at the Ďáblice Cemetery in Prague.

== After his death ==
On 17 July 1948, Bartoš was promoted in memoriam to the rank of major. In 2002, Bartoš was promoted to the rank of colonel.

A monument to him was unveiled in Sezemice in 2007.

In Pardubice, on the corner of Smilova and Sladkovského streets, is a memorial plaque on the spot where Bartoš turned his weapon against himself.
