= Zuzana Vejvodová =

Czech actress (born 1980)

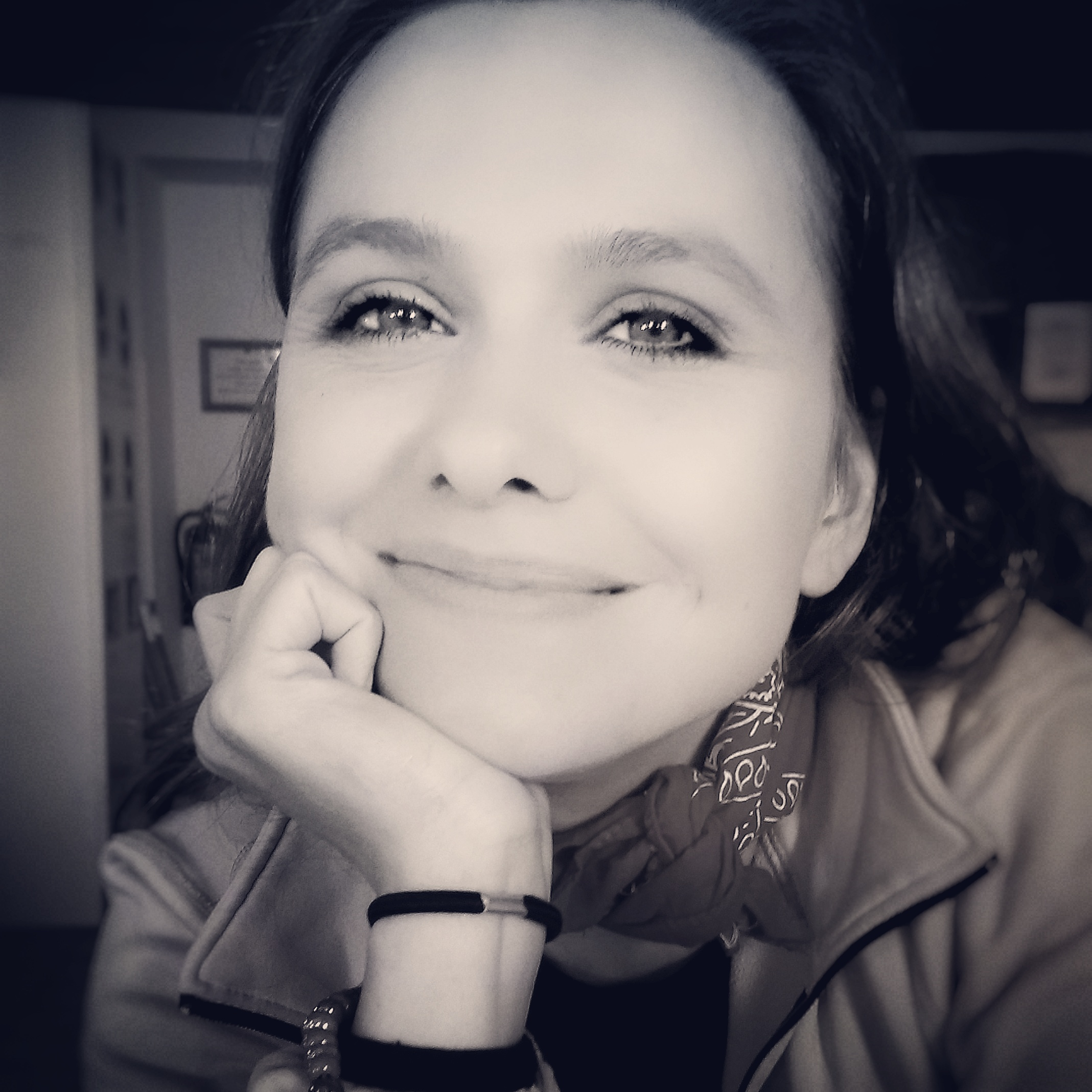
- Zuzana Vejvodová in 2016
- Born: 19 September 1980 (age 44); Prague, Czechoslovakia
- Occupation: Actress
- Years active: 1990–present
- Children: 1

Zuzana Vejvodová (born 19 September 1980, Prague, Czechoslovakia) is a Czech actress.

In 2000 she graduated from Prague Conservatory. Afterwards, she joined Divadlo Na Fidlovačce (DNF). She regularly performs in TV films and series. In April 2008 she was shortlisted for TýTý Award, an annual Czech television award, in one of the categories. She is daughter of composer and bandleader Josef Vejvoda and granddaughter of Jaromír Vejvoda.

== Selected performances ==
- 2009 – Irina in Three sisters
- 2006 – Desdemona in Othello, Summer Shakespeare Festival at the Prague Castle (SSF)
- 2006 – Millie Dillmount in Thoroughly Modern Millie, DNF
- 2005 – Jacie Triplethree in Comic Potential, DNF
- 2005 – Viola in Twelfth Night, or What You Will, SSF
- 2004 – Juliet in Romeo and Juliet, SSF
- 2003 – Rosalind in As You Like It, DNF
- 2003 – Tereza in Rebelové, Divadlo Broadway Praha
- 2002 – Agatha in The Marriage, DNF
- 2001 – Nele - Betkina - Anna in Thyl Ulenspiegel by Grigory Gorin and Gennady Gladkov, DNF
- 2001 – Denise in Mam'zelle Nitouche, DNF
- 2000 – Bandit's Sweetheart in Painted on Glass by Ernest Bryll and Katarzyna Gärtner, DNF (10 years on repertoire)
- 1998 – Annabella in 'Tis Pity She's a Whore, Divadlo na Vinohradech
- 1998 – Chava in Fiddler on the Roof, DNF (in 2011 still on repertoire)

== Selected filmography ==
- 2007 – Alžběta in The Countesses (Hraběnky)
- 2004 – Kamila Stösslová in In Search of Janacek (Hledání Janáčka)
- 1991 – Leontýnka in The Territory of White Deer (Území bílých králů)
