= Jaromír Vejvoda =

Czech composer (1902–1988)

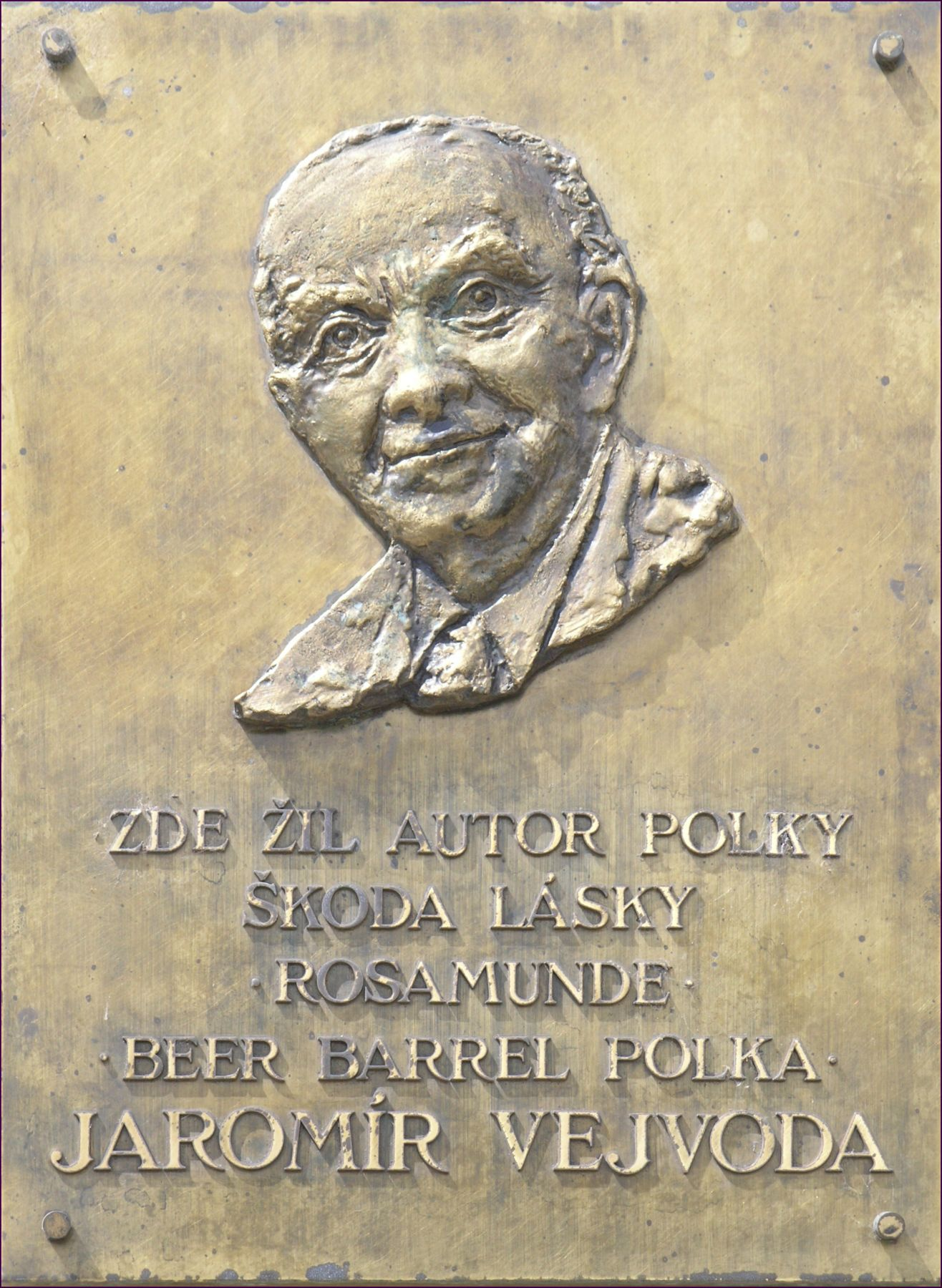
Memorial plaque of Jaromír Vejvoda with "Beer Barrel Polka"

Jaromír Vejvoda (28 March 1902 – 13 November 1988) was a Czech composer. He is best known as the author of the "Beer Barrel Polka".

== Life and work ==
Vejvoda was born and died in Prague-Zbraslav. From 1936 to 1960, he lived in Vrané nad Vltavou, after he married the local native Božena Zamrazilová.

He learned to play the fiddle and flugelhorn in a band led by his father. Later he played these instruments in a military band. He started to compose in the 1920s while he worked as a bartender in a pub owned by his father-in-law. In 1929 he wrote the Modřanská polka named after Modřany, a suburb of Prague where it was played the first time. This catchy tune became a hit and allowed Vejvoda to pursue music as a full-time professional. It was published in 1934 with lyrics Škoda lásky, kterou jsem tobě dala... Publishing house Shapiro Bernstein acquired the rights shortly before World War II and the polka, now the "Beer Barrel Polka" with the English lyrics "Roll out the barrel...", became the most popular song of the Allies in the West, although the original Czech lyrics have a very different meaning and do not speak about beer. After the war this polka became popular around the world, in German-speaking countries as "Rosamunde".

Vejvoda wrote many other hits, such as Kdyby ty muziky nebyly ("If those bands did not exist") and Já ráda tancuju ("I love to dance") but none of them became popular outside of the Czech and German speaking countries.

Vejvoda had three sons: Jaromír, Jiří and Josef. Josef continues the family tradition of being musician, composer and bandleader. His granddaughter Zuzana is a musical actress.

== Vejvoda's Beer Barrel Polka in film ==
- At the Circus (1939, USA)
- La Paloma – Große Freiheit Nr. 7 (1943, Germany)
- The Human Comedy (1943, USA)
- A Night in Casablanca (1946, USA)
- The Best Years of Our Lives (1946, USA)
- The Captive Heart (1946, UK)
- The Cruel Sea (1953, UK)
- From Here to Eternity (1953, USA)
- Ročník 21 ("Born in '21", 1957, Czech)
- Sudba cheloveka ("Destiny of a Man" in the UK or "Fate of a Man" in the US, 1959, USSR)
- The Longest Day (1962, USA)
- Atentát ("The Assassination", 1964, Czech)
- La communale ("Public School", 1965, France)
- Nebeští jezdci ("Riders in the Sky", 1968, Czech)
- Место встречи изменить нельзя (The Meeting Place Cannot Be Changed 1979, USSR)
- The Pokrovsky Gate (1982, USSR)
- M*A*S*H (1972 to 1983, USA)
- Bitva za Moskvu (1985, USSR)
- Brewster's Millions (1985, USA)
- Born in East L.A. (sang as Rosamunde-Polka)(1987, USA)
- The Unbearable Lightness of Being (1988, USA)
- The Elementary School (1991, Czechoslovakia)
- Roommates (1995, USA)
- A Walk in the Clouds (1995, USA)
- In Love and War (1996, USA)
- Jakob the Liar (1999, USA)
- Weird: The Al Yankovic Story (2022, USA)
- Puss in Boots: The Last Wish (2022, USA)

== Beer Barrel Polka audio recordings ==
1954: John Serry Sr. performed for accordion & ensemble for RCA Victor (See RCA Thesaurus)

1955: Larry Hooper with Lawrence Welk and ensemble (video link)
