= Miřetice (Benešov District) =

- Municipality
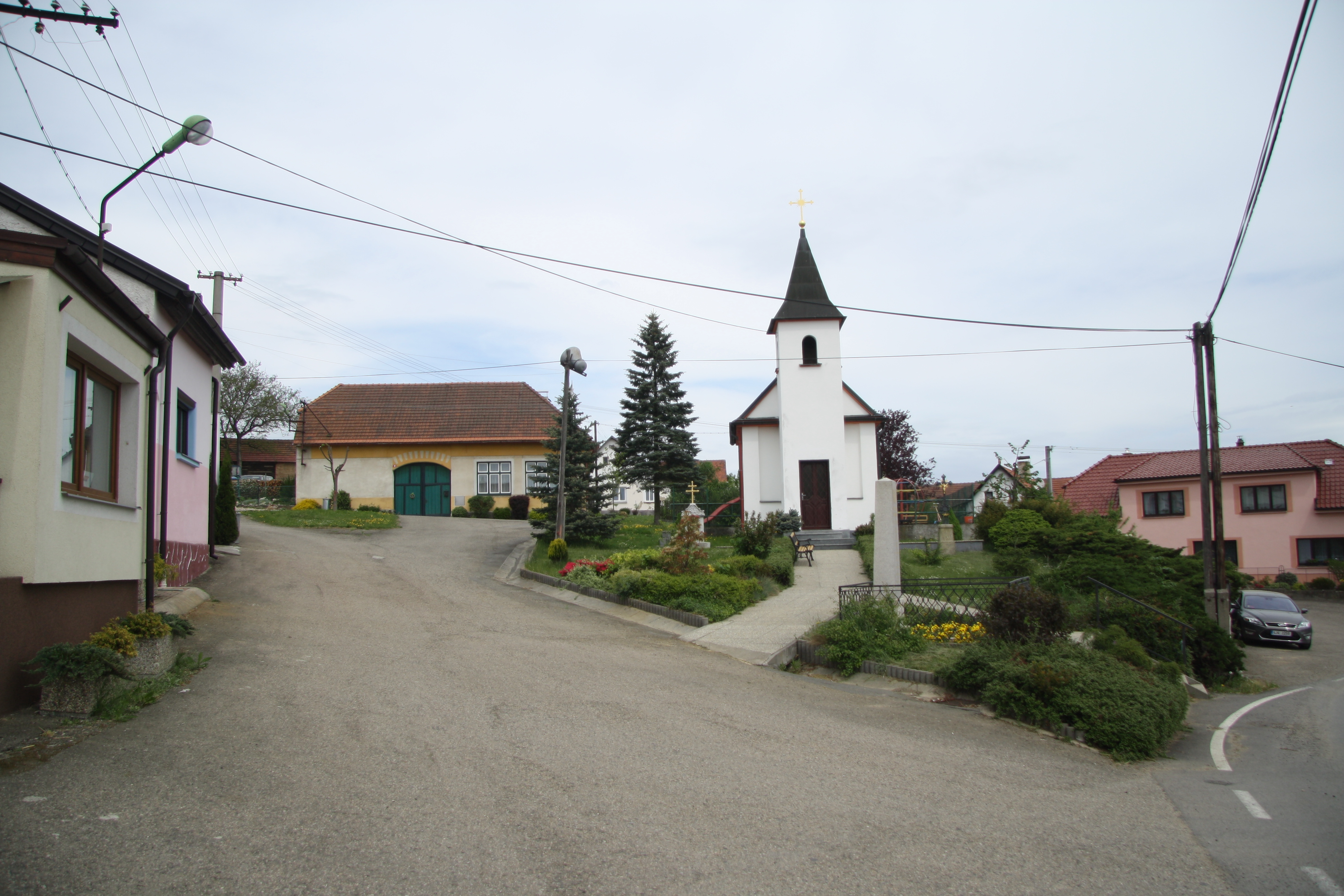
- Centre of Miřetice

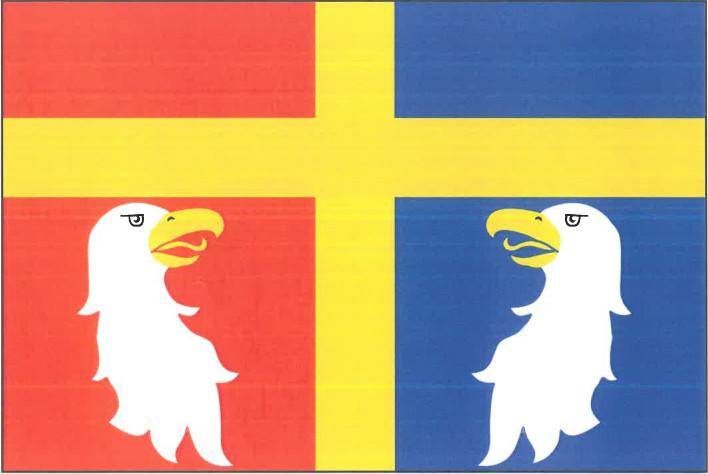
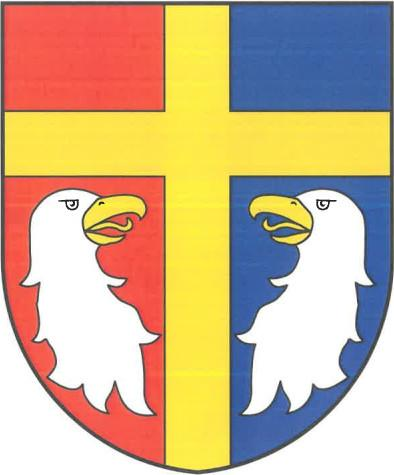
- Flag Coat of arms

- Location in the Czech Republic
- Coordinates: 49°39′32″N 14°58′36″E
- Country: Czech Republic
- Region: Central Bohemian
- District: Benešov
- First mentioned: 1274

Area
  - Total: 2.45 km^{2} (0.95 sq mi)
- Elevation: 505 m (1,657 ft)

Population (2026-01-01)
  - Total: 261
  - Density: 107/km^{2} (276/sq mi)
- Time zone: UTC+1 (CET)
  - Summer (DST): UTC+2 (CEST)
- Postal code: 257 65
- Website: www.miretice.eu

Miřetice is a municipality and village in Benešov District in the Central Bohemian Region of the Czech Republic. It has about 300 inhabitants.

== Demographics ==
Historical population
| Year | Pop. | ±% |
|---|---|---|
| 1869 | 261 | — |
| 1880 | 240 | −8.0% |
| 1890 | 227 | −5.4% |
| 1900 | 228 | +0.4% |
| 1910 | 232 | +1.8% |
| 1921 | 234 | +0.9% |
| 1930 | 227 | −3.0% |
| 1950 | 167 | −26.4% |
| 1961 | 194 | +16.2% |
| 1970 | 165 | −14.9% |
| 1980 | 128 | −22.4% |
| 1991 | 125 | −2.3% |
| 2001 | 155 | +24.0% |
| 2011 | 153 | −1.3% |
| 2021 | 202 | +32.0% |
Source: Censuses
