= Josef Vejvoda =

Czech composer

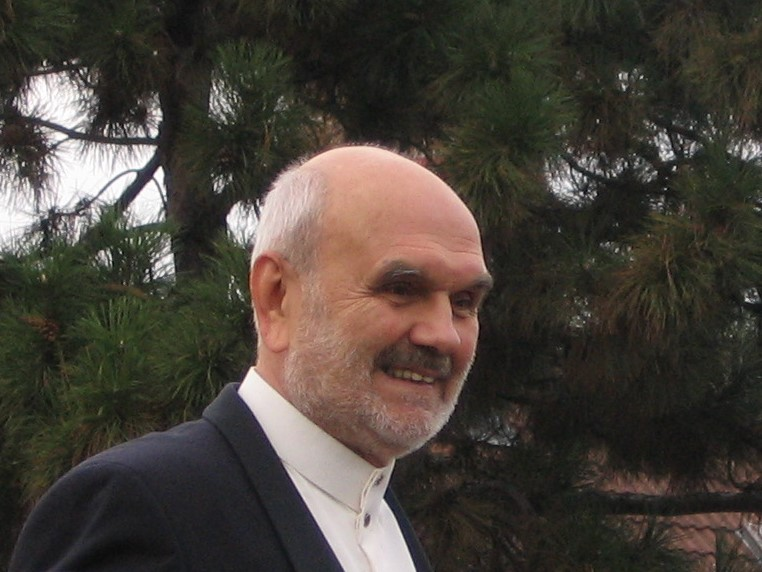
Josef Vejvoda (2017)

Josef Vejvoda (born 13 July 1945, Prague, Czechoslovakia) is a Czech composer, percussionist, conductor and bandleader.

His first notable appearance took place in 1963, when he performed with Jiří Stivín's Jazztet at the Theatre on the Balustrade. In 1967, he was awarded Laureate of the Prague Jazz International Contest of Young Soloists. He graduated from Prague Conservatory in 1970.

He recorded albums with Karel Velebný's SHQ, with the Big Band of the Český rozhlas (Czech Radio), with Laco Déczi, with Emil Viklický, as well as with several musicians from abroad. A Meeting To Build A Dream On, an album with recording of a performance with Benny Bailey at the Přerov Jazz Festival, was awarded The Best Jazz Album of 2001 by the Český rozhlas.

In 2002, on the centenary of Jaromír Vejvoda, he conducted his father's Beer Barrel Polka at Carnegie Hall.

Vejvoda is married and has two daughters. One of them, Monika Šterbáková-Vejvodová, is a conductor; the other daughter, Zuzana Vejvodová, became an actress.
