= Václav Krahulík =

Music Composer

- Born: 31 December 1966; Ústí nad Labem, Czech Republic
- Education: Teplice Conservatory; Prague Academy of Music
- Occupations: Pianist; Musicologist; Academic teacher
- Organizations: Teplice Conservatory; Jan Evangelista Purkyně University in Ústí nad Labem

Václav Krahulík (born 31 December 1966) is a Czech pianist, composer, musicologist and academic teacher.

== Life ==
Krahulík was born in Ústí nad Labem. He studied piano at the Teplice Conservatory with Jaroslav Čermák and at the Prague Academy of Music with Pavel Štěpán. He won the Marienbad Frédéric Chopin competition in 1983, the Hradec Králové Bedřich Smetana competition in 1986, and the Hradec nad Moravicí Ludwig van Beethoven competition in 1989, for the best interpretation of a contemporary piece, his own Piano Sonata in F Sharp. From 1990 to 2003, he taught at the Teplice Conservatory; in 1995, he was appointed professor at the Jan Evangelista Purkyně University in Ústí nad Labem. He has recorded several CDs, with music by Miloš Bok, Franz Liszt, Jean-Gaspard Páleníček and his own compositions, and also recorded and performed with horn player Radek Baborák.

== Work ==
=== Compositions ===
- Titan (etude, 1983)
- World of Silence (sonata, 1984)
- Fantasy and Fugue on the theme BACH (1985)
- Sonata in F Sharp (1986)
- Jazz Etudes (1986–2010)

=== Writings ===
- Connections between philosophy, art and culture (in: Sborník UJEP, Ústí nad Labem 2000).
- Searching for the turning point in the broader context of European musical thought in the period between late Romantism and Modernism (in: Sborník Univerzity Mateja Bela, Banská Bystrica 2004).
- Impressionist tendencies in Franz Liszt's music (in: Sborník UJEP, Ústí nad Labem 2009).
- The whole tone scale as an important factor of suppressing the functional cadenza system in Franz Liszt's music (in: Sborník UJEP, Ústí nad Labem 2010).
- Impressionist and atonal tendencies in Franz Liszt's music – an anticipation of the harmonic phenomenons of the 20th century (Ústí nad Labem 2010).
