= Operation Silver A =

Operation Silver A was a World War II military operation against the Nazi occupation of Czechoslovakia. It was organized by the intelligence division of the Czechoslovak government-in-exile with the assistance of the British SOE and RAF.

It was to parachute a three-man team into the Kolin area to establish liaison with the resistance forces in German-occupied Czechoslovakia (28 December 1941/2 July 1942).

The three-man team consisted of Alfréd Bartoš, team leader; Josef Valčík, his deputy—who would later play a part in Operation Anthropoid—and Jiří Potůček, their cryptographer and radio operator.
