= Jiří Dvořák =

Czech actor

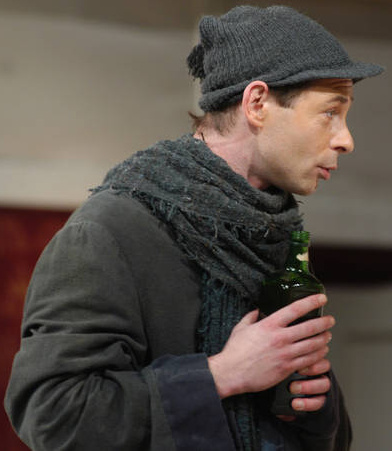
- Dvořák in A Flea in Her Ear
- Born: 4 February 1967 (age 59); Brno, Czechoslovakia
- Education: Janáček Academy
- Occupation: Actor
- Years active: 1989–present
- Spouse: Barbora Munzarová (2002–2009)
- Children: Anna (daughter)

Jiří Dvořák (born 4 February 1967 in Brno) is a Czech actor. He starred in the film Operace Silver A under director Jiří Strach in 2007.

In December 2018, Dvořák won the ninth season of StarDance with his professional partner Lenka Nora Návorková.

== Dubbing Works ==
=== Films ===
- (2010) Red Dragon (Francis Dolarhyde) (Ralph Fiennes)
- (2010) Clash of the Titans (Hádes) (Ralph Fiennes)
- (2010) Sunshine (Ignatz Sonnenschein / Adam Sors / Ivan Sors) (Ralph Fiennes)
- (2006) Hamlet (Hamlet) (Mel Gibson)

=== TV shows ===
- Game of Thrones (Tyrion Lannister)
- Rome (Titus Pollo)
- ER (Luka Kovač)
- CSI: Crime Scene Investigation (Nick Stokes)
- Dead Zone (Johnny Smith)
- Sliders (Quinn Mallory)
- Star Trek: Enterprise - (Johnatan Archer) (Series 1 and 2
