= Jiří Strach =

Czech director and actor (born 1973)

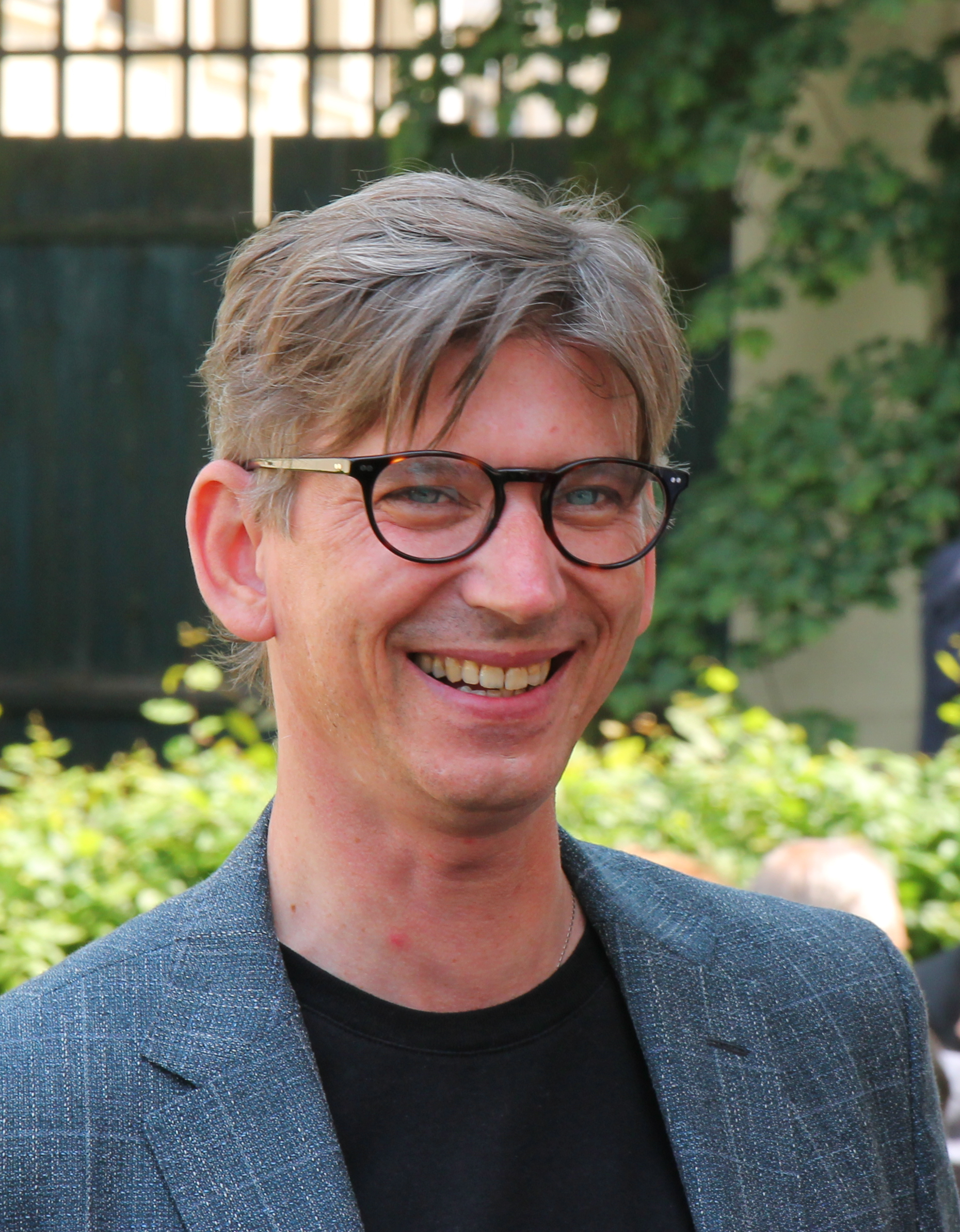
- Jiří Strach in 2018
- Born: 29 October 1973 (age 52); Prague, Czechoslovakia
- Occupations: Film director, actor
- Years active: 1984–present

Jiří Strach (born 29 September 1973) is a Czech film director and actor. He is considered one of the most talented and kindest Czech film directors of the 21st century. Among his most successful films are the fairy tales Angel of the Lord (as film director) and Lotrando a Zubejda (as actor).

== Life ==
Jiří Strach was born on 29 September 1973 in Prague. He has an older brother. As a child, Strach got several roles in films. After graduating from high school, he decided to study acting direction at Film and TV School of the Academy of Performing Arts in Prague (FAMU). In 2006, he got married.

Strach is a practising Catholic and a member of the Order of Saint Dominic.

== Acting ==
Strach started out as an actor. He acted in more than twenty films and TV series as a child, but his most famous role and the only lead role (in the fairy tale film Lotrando a Zubejda) came as an adult, at a time when he no longer planned to return to acting. After that, he only occasionally appeared in minor roles. Notable films and TV series in which he appeared include:

- Forbidden Dreams (1987)
- Křeček v noční košili (TV series; 1987)
- The Dance Teacher (1994)
- Bylo nás pět (TV series; 1995)
- Lotrando a Zubejda (1997)
- Strážce duší (TV series; 2005)
- Little Knights Tale (2009)
- How Poets Wait for a Miracle (2016)

== Film directing ==
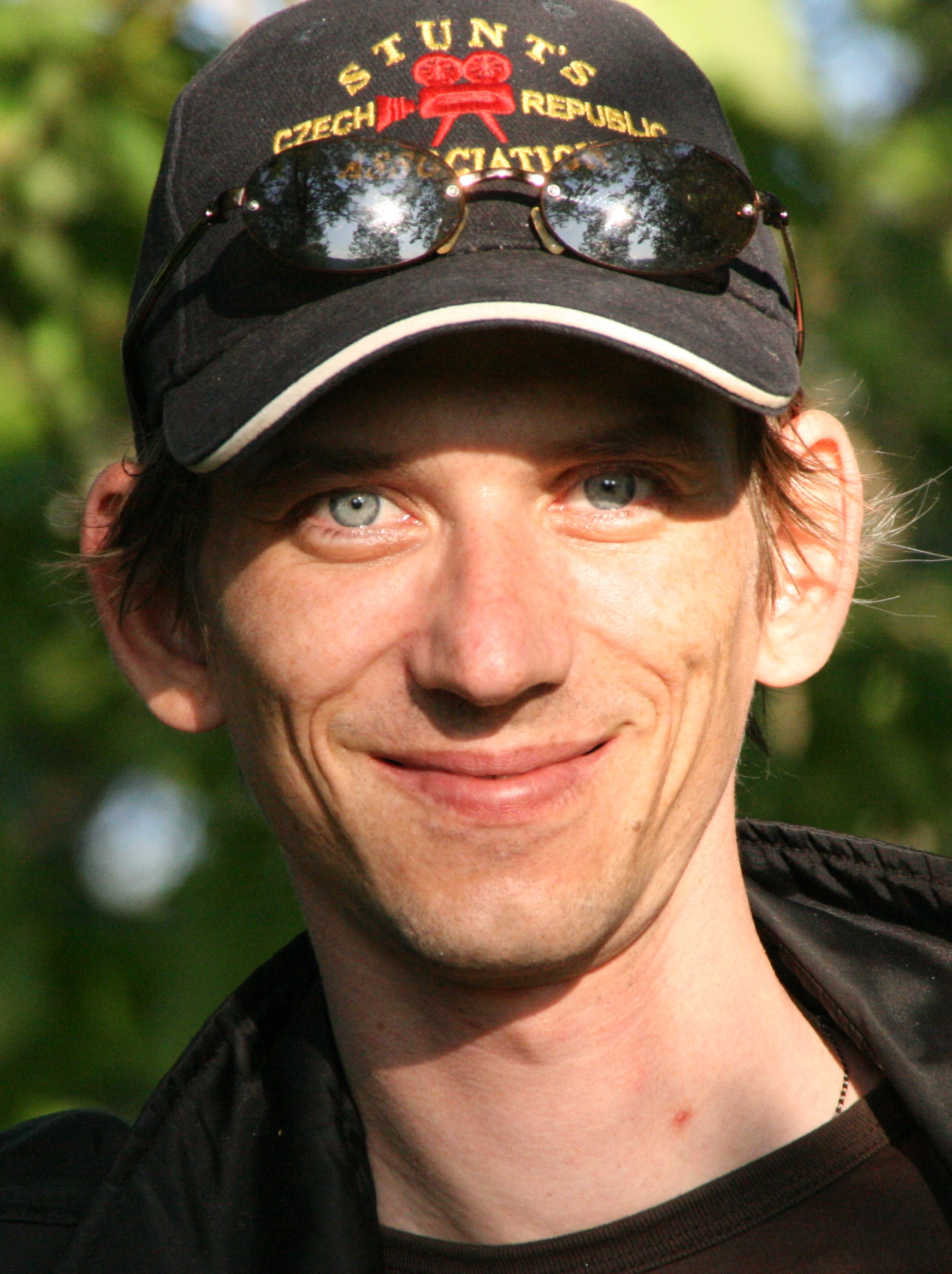
Strach in 2007

Jiří Strach is considered one of the most talented Czech directors of the 21st century and one of the kindest filmmakers. His film fairy tale Angel of the Lord has become a cult film in the Czech Republic and is regularly reprised every Christmas. He likes to make films of different genres. Among the actors most frequently cast in his films are Ivan Trojan and Jiří Dvořák, who also played the lead roles in Angel of the Lord.

Films directed by Strach include:

- Angel of the Lord (2005)
- Operace Silver A (2007)
- Ďáblova lest (2009)
- Ztracená brána (2012)
- Labyrint (TV series; 2015–2018)
- Angel of the Lord 2 (2016; also as screenwriter)
- Docent (TV series; 2023–2026)

In the early days of his directing career, Strach also worked as a voice acting director, primarily for animated films. He directed Czech dubbing for films such as Finding Nemo (2003) and The Incredibles (2004).

In 2025, he first got into theatre directing when he accepted an offer to direct the musical version of Lotrando a Zubejda.
