= Hana (given name) =

- Gender: Female

Origin
- Meaning: the grace of God (Hebrew); moon (Albanian); happiness (Arabic); flower (Japanese); one (Korean); to glow (Maori); hope (Kurdish)

Other names
- Related names: Hannah; Mana

Hana as a given name may have any of several origins. It is also a version of a Hebrew name from the root ḥ-n-n meaning "favour" or "grace", a Kurdish name meaning hope (هانا), a Persian name meaning flower (حَنا) and an Arabic name meaning "bliss" (هَناء). As a Japanese name, it is usually translated as flower (花). In Korean, it means the number one (하나). In Hawaiian, "Hana" means "craft" or "work". In Māori, "Hana" means to shine, glow, give out love or radiance, and can also be a transliteration of the name Hannah. In Albanian, "Hana" means the moon.

== People ==
=== Czech and Slovak ===
- Hana Andronikova (1967–2011), Czech writer
- Hana Bajtošová (born 1984), Slovak mountain biker
- Hana Benešová (born 1975), Czech sprinter
- Hana Birnerová (born 1989), Czech tennis player
- Hana Blažíková (born 1980), Czech soprano and harpist
- Hana Bobková (1929–2017), Czech gymnast
- Hana Bořkovcová (1927–2009), Czech writer
- Hana Brady (1931–1944), Czech Holocaust victim
- Hana Brejchová (1946–2024), Czech actress
- Hana Burzalová (born 2000), Slovak racewalker
- Hana Černá (born 1974), Czech freestyle and medley swimmer
- Hana Dariusová (born 1973), Czech rower
- Hana Dostalová (1890–1981), Czech painter
- Hana Doušová (1949–2023), Czech basketball player
- Hana Fukárková (born 1964), Czech tennis player
- Hana Greenfield (1926–2014), Czech concentration camp survivor
- Hana Gregorová (1885–1958), Slovak writer and editor
- Hana Haasová (born 2003), Czech ice hockey player
- Hana Hegerová (1931–2021), Slovak singer
- Hana Holišová (born 1980), Czech actress and singer
- Hana Horáková (born 1979), Czech basketball player
- Hana Janků (1940–1995), Czech opera singer
- Hana Jonášová (born 1966), Czech opera singer
- Hana Kafková (born 1965), Czech rower
- Hana Kavková (born 1952), Czech rower
- Hana Knapová (born 1956), Czechoslovak figure skater
- Hana Knížová, Czech photographer
- Hana Kolářová (born 1988), Czech triathlete
- Hana Kolníková (born 1989), Slovak athlete
- Hana Koudelová, Czechoslovak slalom canoeist
- Hana Krampolová (1961–2020), Czech actress
- Hana Krupková (1921–1997), Czech resistance member
- Hana Kvapilová (1866–1907), Czech actress
- Hana Kvášová (born 1989), Czech handball player
- Hana Librová (born 1943), Czech biologist
- Hana Lišková (born 1952), Czech gymnast
- Hana Machatová-Bogušovská (born 1938), Czech rhythmic gymnast
- Hana Maciuchová (1945–2021), Czech actress
- Hana Mandlíková (born 1962), Czech professional tennis player
- Hana Martínková (born 1985), Czech handball player
- Hana Marvanová (born 1962), Czech lawyer and politician
- Hana Mašková (1949–1972), Czech figure skater
- Hana Matelová (born 1990), Czech table tennis player
- Hana Meličková (1900–1978), Slovak actress
- Hana Mičechová (1946–2020), Czech gymnast
- Hana Mučková (born 1998), Czech handball player
- Hana Orgoníková (1945–2014), Czech politician
- Hana Peterková (born 1987), Czech canoeist
- Hana Pleskačová (born 1966), Czechoslovak sprint canoer
- Hana Ponická (1922–2007), Slovak writer and dissident
- Hana Maria Pravda (1916–2008), Czech actress
- Hana Preinhaelterová (1938–2018), Czech indologist (1938-2018)
- Hana Purkrábková (1936–2019), Czech ceramist and sculptor
- Hana Říčná (born 1968), Czechoslovak gymnast
- Hana Růžičková (1941–1981), Czech gymnast
- Hana Skalníková (born 1982), Czech beach volleyball player
- Hana Sládková-Koželuhová (born 1928), Czech former tennis player
- Hana Sloupová (born 1991), Czech football player
- Hana Soukupová (born 1985), Czech model
- Hana Šromová (born 1978), Czech tennis player
- Hana Storchová (1936–2024), Czech painter and printmaker
- Hana Strachoňová (born 1961), Czech tennis player
- Hana Svobodová (born 1988), Czech model
- Hana Truncová (1924–2022), Czech political prisoner
- Hana Vagnerová (born 1983), Czech actress
- Hana Vejvodová (1963–1994), Czech pianist
- Hana Veselá (born 1953), Czechoslovak figure skater
- Hana Vlasáková (1948–2023), Czech volleyball player
- Hana Voglová (1913–2005), Czech translator and interpreter
- Hana Vymazalová (born 1978), Czech Egyptologist
- Hana Vítová (1914–1987), Czech actress
- Hana Zagorová (1946–2022), Czech singer
- Hana Zelinová (1914–2004), Slovak writer
- Hana Žáková (born 1974), Czech rower
- Hana Zarevúcká (born 1961), Czech basketball player

=== Japanese ===
The proper name Hana (花) is pronounced [haꜜ.na] (accented on the first syllable), as opposed to the common noun hana (花; transl. flower) which is pronounced [ha.naꜜ] (accented on the second syllable).

- Hana Hishikawa (born 2003), Japanese voice actress
- Hana Kimura (1997–2020), Japanese professional wrestler
- Hana Kobayashi (born 1982), Venezuelan-Japanese singer
- Hana Koike (born 2005), Japanese competition climber
- Hana Nagata (born 2000), Japanese rugby sevens player
- Hana Noake (born 2004), Japanese speed skater
- Hana Shimano, Japanese voice actress
- Hana Sugisaki (born 1997), Japanese actress
- Hana Takahashi (born 2000), Japanese footballer
- Hana Tamegai (born 1997), Japanese voice actress and singer
- Hana Toyoshima (born 2007), Japanese actress
- Hana Usui (born 1974), Japanese artist
- Hana Wada (born 2002), Japanese shogi player
- Hana Wakimoto (born 1997), Japanese professional golfer
- Hana Yoshida (born 2005), Japanese figure skater

=== Korean ===
- Baek Ha-na (born 2000), South Korean badminton player
- Im Ha-na (born 2000), South Korean sport shooter
- Jang Ha-na (born 1992), South Korean golfer
- Jung Ha-na (born 1990), South Korean singer and television personality
- Kim Ha-na (born 1989), South Korean badminton player
- Lee Ha-na (born 1982), South Korean actress
- Hana Mae Lee (born 1988), Korean-American actress
- Oh Ha-na (born 1985), South Korean fencer
- Park Ha-na (born 1985), South Korean actress
- Park Ha-na (basketball) (born 1990), South Korean basketball player
- Seo Ha-na (born 1987), South Korean Paralympic judoka
- Yoo Ha-na (born 1986), South Korean actress

=== Arab ===
- Hana Alomair, Saudi director
- Hana El-Samad, Lebanese-American scientist
- Hana Elhebshi (born c. 1985), Libyan activist
- Hana Gaddafi (born 1985), Daughter of former Libyan leader Muammar Gaddafi
- Hana Goda (born 2007), Egyptian table tennis player
- Hana Hajjar, Saudi cartoonist
- Hana Khatib (born 1973), Israeli Arab lawyer
- Hana Laszlo (born 1953), Israeli actress and comedian
- Hana Majaj (born 1982), Jordanian swimmer
- Hana Malhas (born 2000), Jordanian singer-songwriter
- Hana Mareghni (born 1989), Tunisian judo practitioner
- Hana Moataz (born 2000), Egyptian squash player
- Hana Hussien Naghawi (born 1971), Jordanian civil engineering professor
- Hana Nasser (born 1991), Israeli footballer
- Hana Ramadan (born 1997), Egyptian professional squash player
- Yehoshua Hana Rawnitzki (1859–1944), Hebrew publisher and editor
- Hana Sadiq (born 2000), Iraqi fashion designer
- Hana Ali Saleh (born 1968), Yemeni sprinter
- Hana Shalabi (born 1982), Palestinian prisoner in Israel
- Hana Sheha (born 1985), Egyptian actress
- Hana Shiha (born 1985), Egyptian actress
- Hana Sweid (born 1955), Israeli Arab politician
- Hana Tarazi, Palestinian technocrat
- Hana Yousry (born 2000), Egyptian singer and actor
- Hana El Zahed (born 1994), Egyptian actress-singer

=== Other ===
- Hana Maria Aboian (born 2010), American ice dancer
- Hana Antunovic, Swedish karateka
- Hana Pera Aoake, New Zealand artist, poet and writer
- Hana Basic (born 1996), Australian sprinter
- Hana Bath (born 2010), Australian figure skater
- Hana Beaman, American snowboarder
- Hana Beshie, Filipino drag performer
- Hana Burton (born 1997), American racing driver
- Hana Gartner (born 1948), Canadian investigative journalist
- Hana Ghassan (born 1968), Brazilian politician
- Hana Guy (born 1969), New Zealand tennis player
- Hana (American musician) (born 1989), American singer
- Hana Hayes (born 1999), American actress
- Hana Hegedušić (born 1976), Croatian actress
- Hana Huljić (born 1990), Dalmatian singer, composer and songwriter
- Hana Jalloul (born 1978), Spanish politician
- Hana Mazi Jamnik (2002–2022), Slovenian cross-country skier
- Hana Jušić (born 1983), Croatian film director and screenwriter
- Hana Kerner (born 1997), American soccer player
- Hana Kuk (born 1986), Hong Kong singer-songwriter
- Hana Lili (born 2000), Welsh singer-songwriter
- Hana Sofia Lopes (born 1990), Luxembourgish-Portuguese actress
- Hana Lowry (born 2003), Australian soccer player
- Hana-Rawhiti Maipi-Clarke (born 2002), New Zealand politician
- Hana Makhmalbaf (born 1988), Iranian filmmaker
- Hana Malasan (born 1991), Indonesian actress
- Hana Meisel (1883–1972), Russian agronomist
- Hana Moll (born 2005), American athlete
- Hana Catherine Mullens (1826–1861), Swiss writer
- Hana O'Regan (born 1973), Māori language advocate and academic
- Hana Pestle (born 1989), American musician
- Hana Sachsová (1907–1987), Czechoslovak politician
- Hana Schank, American writer and public interest technologist
- Hana Hasanah Shahab (born 1969), Indonesian politician
- Hana Shezifi (born 1943), Iraqi-born Israeli runner
- Hana Shimozumi (1893–1978), American singer
- Hana Starkman (born 2004), American rhythmic gymnast
- Hana Tajima (born 1986), British fashion designer
- Hana Te Hemara (1940–1999), Māori activist and leader
- Hana Vu (born 2000), American singer-songwriter
- Hana Vučko (born 1998), Slovenian handball player
- Hana Wirth-Nesher (born 1948), German-born American-Israeli literary scholar

== Fictional characters ==
Works from Japan

- Hana Asakura, in the manga series Shaman King
- Hana Inuzuka, in the manga and anime series Naruto, and anime series Naruto Shippuden
- Hana Isuzu, in the anime series Girls und Panzer
- Saki Hanajima (Hana-chan), in the manga and anime series Fruits Basket
- Hana Yamaguchi, in the Japanese manga series Guru Guru Pon-chan

Works from elsewhere

- Hana Gitelman, a character in 2006–2010 American graphic novel series Heroes
- Hana Stoppable, in the 2002–2007 Disney Channel animated series Kim Possible
- D.Va, real name Hana Song, in the video games Overwatch and Heroes of the Storm
- Hana Tsu-Vachel, in the American video game series Fear Effect

== See also ==
- Hana (disambiguation)
