= Yousry =

Yousry or Yousri (Arabic: يسري) is a masculine given name and surname of Arabic origin. Notable people with this name include:

== Given name ==
=== Yousri ===
- Yousri Belgaroui (born 1992), Dutch-Tunisian kickboxer
- Yousri Bouzok (born 1996), Algerian footballer

=== Yousry ===
- Yousry Saber Hussein El-Gamal (born 1947), Egyptian politician and government minister
- Yousry Hafez (born 1993), Egyptian boxer
- Yousry Nasrallah (born 1952), Egyptian film director
- Yousry Zagloul (born 1954), Egyptian judoka

== Middle name ==
=== Yousri ===
- Mohamed Yousri Salama (1974–2013), Egyptian politician

== Surname ==
=== Yousri ===
- Madiha Yousri (1921–2018), Egyptian actress
- Nahed Yousri (born 1949), Egyptian actress

=== Yousry ===
- Amina Yousry (born 2000), Egyptian squash player
- Hana Yousry (born 2000), Egyptian singer and actor
- Mohamed Yousry, Egyptian interpreter

== See also ==
- Yousra, feminine of Yousri/Yousry
