= Mana (given name) =

- Pronunciation: Mah-nah (Japanese, feminine), mah-NAH (Persian, masculine)
- Gender: Female (Japanese), gender-neutral (Persian)

Origin
- Origin: Japanese, Persian, Indian
- Meaning: In Japanese; different meanings depending on the kanji used. In Persian; "everlasting." In Hindi; "respect, assumption, consideration, or conception."

Other names
- Alternative spelling: Mahna, Maana, Mañá, Maná, Manna, Mahnah, Manah
- Variant forms: Mahna, Maana
- Related names: Hana; Mina

Mana is a given name that is typically feminine in Japan and gender-neutral in Iran.

== People ==
=== Men ===
- Mana, Japanese musician
- Mana of Bet-Parsaje, a 4th-century Christian martyr
- Mana of Seleucia-Ctesiphon, a 5th-century bishop
- Mana of Rew Ardashir, a 6th-century East Syriac metropolitan bishop.
- Mana Abdulla Sulaiman, Emirati paralympic athlete
- Mana Al Otaiba (born 1946), Emirati politician, businessman and writer
- Mana Dembélé (born 1988), Malian footballer
- Mana Hira Davis, New Zealand stuntman
- Mana Mamuwene (born 1947), Congolese football player
- Mana Neyestani (born 1973), Iranian cartoonist
- Mana Nopnech (born 1981), Thai footballer
- Mana Otai (born 1968), Tongan rugby union player and coach
- Mana Silva (born 1988), American football player
- Mana Strickland (1918–1996), Cook Island educator and politician

=== Women ===
- Mana Abdi, Somali-American politician
- Mana Aghaee (born 1973), Iranian poet, translator, podcast producer, and scholar of Iranian Studies
- Mana Ashida (born 2004), Japanese actress and singer
- Mana Atsumi (born 1989), Japanese softball player
- Mana Endo (born 1971), Japanese tennis player
- Mana Furuta (born 1997), Japanese rugby union and sevens player
- Mana Hirata (born 1985), Japanese actress and voice actress
- Mana Horikawa (born 1994), Japanese handball player
- Mana Ishikawa (born 2009), Japanese swimmer
- Mana Iwabuchi (born 1993), Japanese football player
- Mana Kawabe (born 2004), Japanese figure skater
- Mana Kinjo (1996–2020), Japanese actress, model and tarento
- Mana Mihashi (born 1994), Japanese footballer
- Mana Mollayeva (born 1998), Azerbaijani footballer
- Mana Nishiura (1971–2005), Japanese drummer for Shonen Knife and DMBQ
- Mana Ogawa (born 1993), Japanese actress, voice actress and singer
- Mana Ohyama (born 1992), Japanese handball player
- Mana Sakura (born 1993), Japanese model
- Mana Sasaki (born 1997), Japanese para-athlete
- Mana Shim (born 1991), American soccer player
- Mana Watanabe (born 1993), Japanese women's professional shogi player
- Mana Yamamoto (born 1997), Japanese handball player
- Mana Yoshinaga (born 1979), Japanese singer in Rin'
- Mana-Zucca (1885–1981), American actress
- Mana (c. 9th century BC), Lapita woman whose skeleton was discovered in 2002

== Fictional characters ==
- Mana, a character in Mermaid Saga
- Mana Aida (a.k.a. Cure Heart), protagonist of DokiDoki! PreCure
- Mana Itosu, a character in Accel World
- Mana Kirishima, a Neon Genesis Evangelion character
- Mana Kuzunoha, a character in Tenjho Tenge
- Mana Nagase, a character in Idoly Pride
- Mana Ryougi, an a character in Kara no Kyoukai
- Mana Takamiya, an a character in Date A Live
- Mana Tatsumiya, a character in Mahou Sensei Negima
- Mana Walker, a character in D.Gray-man
