= Yousra (given name) =

Yousra, Yosra, or Yusra is a feminine given name of Arabic origin. It is the feminine equivalent of Yousri. Notable people with the name include:

== Yousra ==
- Yousra (Civene Nessim, born 1955), an Egyptian actress and singer
- Yousra Abdel Razek or Yousra Helmy (born 1995), Egyptian table tennis player
- Yousra Elbagir (born 1982) is a Sudanese-British journalist and writer
- Yousra Ben Jemaa (born 1986), Tunisian Paralympian athlete
- Yousra Matine (born 1996), Moroccan snooker player
- Yousra Saouf (born 1992), Moroccan singer

== Yosra ==
- Yosra Dhieb (born 1995), Tunisian weightlifter
- Yosra Alaa El Din (born 1986), Egyptian chess player
- Yosra Frawes, a Tunisian lawyer and human rights activist
- Yosra El Lozy (born 1985), Egyptian actress

== Yusra ==
- Yusra (archaeologist), a Palestinian archaeologist at Mount Carmel (1929–1935)
- Yusra Al Barbari (1923–2009), Palestinian teacher and activist
- Yusra Mardini (born 1998), Syrian swimmer based in Germany
- Yusra Warsama (born 1987), British-Somali playwright
