= Jana Nechutová =

Czech philologist, professor, and translator

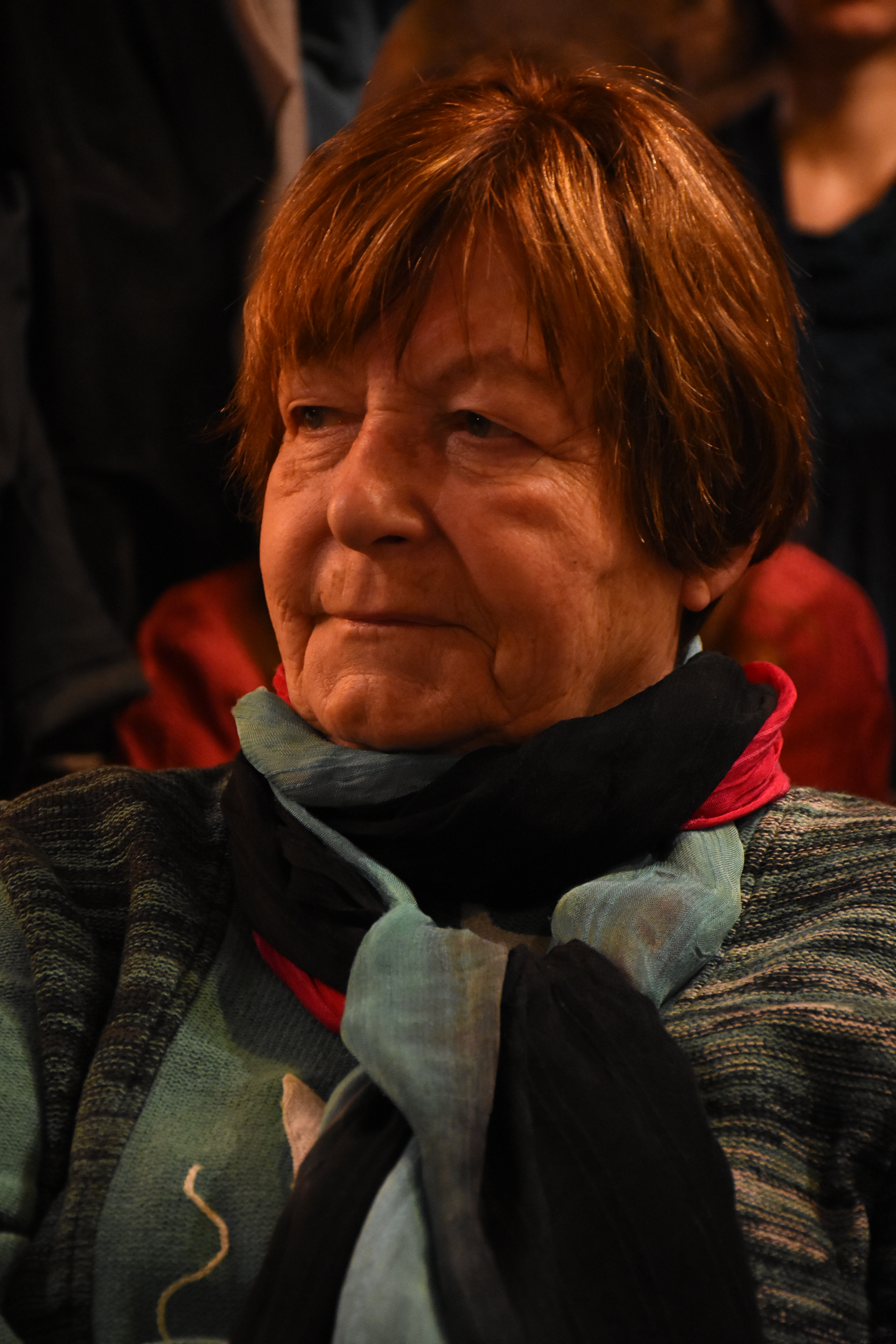
- Born: 28 November 1936; Olomouc, Czechoslovakia

Academic background
- Education: Masaryk University

Academic work
- Discipline: Medieval Studies; Latin
- Institutions: Masaryk University

Jana Nechutová (born 28 November 1936) is a Czech philologist, translator and medievalist. She is professor emerita in the Faculty of Arts at Masaryk University.

== Career ==
Nechutová studied Latin and Greek at the Faculty of Arts, Masaryk University. Subsequently she worked in the State Archives in Třeboň. She returned to Masaryk University in 1961, where she wrote a thesis "Místo Mikuláše z Drážďan v raném reformačním myšlení" ('The place of Nicholas of Dresden in early Reformation thought') in 1965, and a habilitation "Učení Matěje z Janova a jeho působení" ('The teachings of Matthias of Janov and his work') in 1991. In 1992, Nechutová became the first woman to hold the position of head of the department of Classics at Masaryk University. During this time, she was influential in expanding the depeartment's research into Medieval Latin, and in particular Latin Literature produced in Czech lands. In 1995, she became the first female dean of the Faculty of Arts. Nechutová is Professor Emerita.

== Personal life ==
Nechutová's sister, Hana Librová, is a biologist and environmentalist at Masaryk University.

== Publications ==
- Stručné dějiny latinské literatury středověku. Prague: Arista - Baset, 2013
- Caesarius z Heisterbachu, Vyprávění o zázracích. Středověký život v zrcadle exempel. Prague: Vyšehrad, 2009
- Die lateinische Literatur des Mittelalters in Böhmen. Aus dem Tschechischen übersetzt von Hildegard Boková und Václav Bok. 1. vyd. Köln: Böhlau Verlag, 2007
- Aurelius Augustinus, Křesťanská vzdělanost - De doctrina christiana. Prague: Vyšehrad, 2004
- Latinská literatura českého středověku do roku 1400. Prague: Vyšehrad, 2000
- Česká latinsky psaná literatura do roku 1300. Brno: Vydavatelství MU, 1997
- Texty ke cvičením ze středověké latiny. Dotisk. Brno: Vydavatelství Masarykovy univerzity, 1996
- Úděl a útěcha. Konsolační literatura antiky, patristiky a středověku. Heršpice: Eman, 1995
