= Hana Khatib =

Israeli Arab lawyer

- هناء خطيب

Qadi
- Incumbent
- Assumed office 25 April 2017
- Appointed by: Ministry of Justice's Committee to Elect Sharia Judges

Personal details
- Spouse: Fouad Khatib

Hana Khatib (also Hana Mansour-Khatib) (Arabic: هناء خطيب, Hebrew: הנא ח'טיב) is an Israeli Arab lawyer and the first woman appointed to the post of Qadi for a sharia court in Israel.

== Early life and education ==
Khatib was born in Tira. She holds a bachelor's degree in law from Staffordshire University in England as well as a master's degree in mediation from Bar-Ilan University. She specialized in the fields of family law and sharia.

== Appointment and criticism ==
On 25 April 2017, the Ministry of Justice's Committee to Elect Sharia Judges nominated three women and ultimately appointed Khatib unanimously to serve as one of the nine qadis in Shari'a courts in Israel.

Khatib's election came despite governmental opposition to a private bill for the representation of women in judicial positions in Shari'a courts. Members of Knesset from the United Torah Judaism party threatened to use their veto power (which applies to matters of religion and state) in order to thwart the proposal. They feared that such legislation would lead to a precedent that would require the appointment of women to rabbinic courts. In the end, Khatib's appointment was made without legislation.

Other female qadis already serve in the Palestinian Authority, Egypt, Indonesia, Malaysia, Pakistan, and in other Muslim countries.

== Personal life ==
Khatib is a resident of Tamra. She is married and a mother of four children.
