= Hana Tajima =

English–Japanese fashion designer (born 1986)

- ハナ タジマ
- Born: 1986 (age 39–40); South West England, United Kingdom
- Known for: Visual artist; blogger; model; fashion designer

Hana Tajima-Simpson (born 1986) is an English–Japanese visual artist, blogger, model, and fashion designer. She is best known for her frequent collaborations with the Japanese clothing store Uniqlo.

== Early life ==
Hana Tajima was born in southwestern England in 1986 to an English mother and a Japanese father. She was raised as an atheist. As a teenager, Tajima read the Quran and converted to Islam at age 18, and adopted wearing the hijab. She began selling clothing online in 2010.

She later moved to upstate New York in the United States.

== Career ==
Tajima has designed clothing for the Japanese casual wear chain Uniqlo, and is known for her modest clothing designs.

In 2015, Tajima designed a line of hijabs and modest clothing for Uniqlo in Singapore. These were the first hijabs sold by Uniqlo. The line debuted in Malaysia, Singapore, and Indonesia, modelled by the Malaysian popstar, Yuna. The line debuted in the United States and the United Kingdom in February 2016.

A hijab designed by Tajima was featured in MoMa's 2017-2018 exhibition Items: Is Fashion Modern?. Her work has been featured in Vogue Arabia, Refinery 29, Elle, and Nylon.
