= Hana Bořkovcová =

Czech writer

- Born: 4 June 1927; Prague, Czechoslovakia
- Died: 25 February 2009 (aged 81)
- Citizenship: Czech Republic
- Occupation: Author
- Writing career
- Language: Czech
- Genres: Young Adult, Children's Literature
- Subjects: Coming of Age, World War II, The Holocaust, Short Stories,
- Literary movement: Czech Literature

Hana Bořkovcová (4 June 1927 – 25 February 2009), née Knappová, was a Czech novelist and Holocaust survivor. Born in Prague, she was deported to Terezín in 1943, and later to Auschwitz, which she and her mother survived. After the war, she got married and worked with children. Eventually, she began writing stories and novels.

== Biography ==
=== Early life ===
Hana Bořkovcová was born in Prague in 1927 to an assimilated Jewish family. Her father worked as a businessman selling dental supplies. When the Nazis occupied Czechoslovakia, she was expelled from school because she was Jewish.

=== During World War II ===
In 1943, she and her family were deported to Terezín from Prague. In Terezín, Hana worked as an assistant teacher. In the fall of 1944, she and her family were deported to Auschwitz. In Auschwitz, she and her mother survived the selection and were transported to the Gross-Rosen camp, a subcamp of Sachsenhausen. Her father and brother were killed in Auschwitz. In January 1945, Hana and her mother were sent on a death march until the end of the war.

=== After World War II ===
When she returned to Prague after the war, she married and converted to Catholicism. She had five children, and began writing. In 1964, some of Bořkovcová's works began to be published in literary journals, and she also published a fair amount of Young Adult literature. In 2008, Hana was interviewed by Post Bellum, an oral history organisation, as part of their Stories of the 20th Century project. She died on 25 February 2009.

== Works ==
=== Books ===
- Světýlka (1971)
- Vzteklouni (1975)
- My tři cvoci (1973)
- Cesta kolem světa za osmdesát let (1982)
- Stan, do kterého prší (1986)
- Tři cvoci a cizí holka (1987)
- Jdi pryč (1994) (ISBN 80-85282-81-X)
- Zakázané holky (1995) (ISBN 80-00-00216-7)
- Cizí holka (1999) (ISBN 80-00-00667-7)
- Soukromý rozhovor (2004) (ISBN 80-7192-796-1)
- Píšu a sešit mi leží na kolenou (1940 to 1946, published 2011) (ISBN 978-80-259-0055-0)
