= Hana Krupková =

Czech resistance member ((1921–1997)

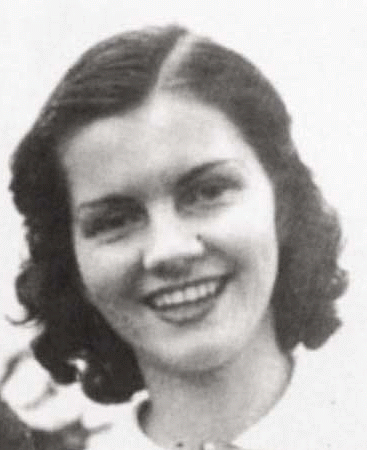
- Krupková in 1941
- Born: Hana Zýková; 31 May 1921; Chotěboř, Czechoslovakia
- Died: 16 April 1997 (aged 75); Puchheim, Germany
- Known for: Czech resistance member in World War II
- Spouse: Václav Krupka

Hana Krupková (née Zýková; 31 May 1921 – 16 April 1997) was a Czech resistance member in World War II.

== Life ==
Hana Zýková was born on 31 May 1921 in Chotěboř. In 1940, at the age of nineteen, she met Václav Krupka in Pardubice. Krupka was initially a professional soldier and cavalry lieutenant in the army of the First Czechoslovak Republic.

After the occupation of the Republic, the establishment of the Protectorate of Bohemia and Moravia, and the dissolution of the Czechoslovak Army, he was assigned to the East Bohemian Electric Union. After a short acquaintance, they married and lived together in Pardubice. Through her friend Taťána Hladěnová, Hana contacted the commander of the Operation Silver A, Alfréd Bartoš, and together with her husband Václav, began to help members of the unit. Václav Krupka and his wife Hana later fell into the hands of the Gestapo through the fault of Karel Čurda a member of the ''Out Distance'' parachute group. He betrayed his friends and revealed to the Gestapo the names of those who were helping the paratroopers.

At that time, Krupková used her charm to win the favor of the investigator criminal advisor of the Prague Gestapo, Wilhelm Schulze. By doing so, she saved her own life and that of her husband, who only learned about this after the end of World War II.

== After World War II ==
After World War II, Krupková was interrogated several times, imprisoned, and finally sentenced to three years in prison for collaborating with the Gestapo (she worked as a Gestapo informant at the Walter Aircraft Engines in Jinonice during the war). In May 1947, Václav Krupka divorced his pregnant wife and continued to work as a professional soldier. During an unsuccessful attempt to emigrate to Germany, Krupková came under the surveillance of the StB (State Security Service) and through a calculated "intelligence game," was finally forced, in February 1949, to sign a cooperation contract with the StB. She then worked for the StB for approximately six years (1955–1961) under the changed identity of Jana Králová in the Prague public transport company.

== Death ==
After August 1968, she legally moved to West Germany, where she remarried, taking the surname Schusterová. Her ex-husband Václav Krupka died in Prague in 1994. Hana Krupková-Schusterová died three years later, on 16 April 1997, in Puchheim (a suburb of Munich), Germany.
