= Hana Sadiq =

Iraqi fashion designer

Hana Sadiq (Arabic: هنا صادق) is an Iraqi fashion designer who has held fashion shows in Amman, Naples, Beirut and Dubai. Her customers include Queen Noor and Queen Rania of Jordan and members of the House of Saud.

Sadiq had a degree in French Literature from the University of Baghdad. Sadiq studied fashion in Paris, France and has split her time between Amman, Jordon and Paris since 1982.
