= Hana Mučková =

Czech handball player

Personal information
- Nationality: Czech
- Born: 4 September 1998 (age 28) Ostrava, Czech Republic
- Height: 1.74 m (5 ft 9 in)

Sport
- Sport: Handball
- Position: Goalkeeper
- Current club: DHC Sokol Poruba

Senior clubs
- Years: Team
- 2015–: DHC Sokol Poruba
National team
- Years: Team
- 2018–: Czech Republic

Hana Mučková (born 4 September 1998) is a Czech handball player who plays for DHC Sokol Poruba and the Czech Republic national team.

== Achievements ==
- Czech First Division:
  - Bronze Medalist: 2016
