= Hana Kolářová =

Czech triathlete

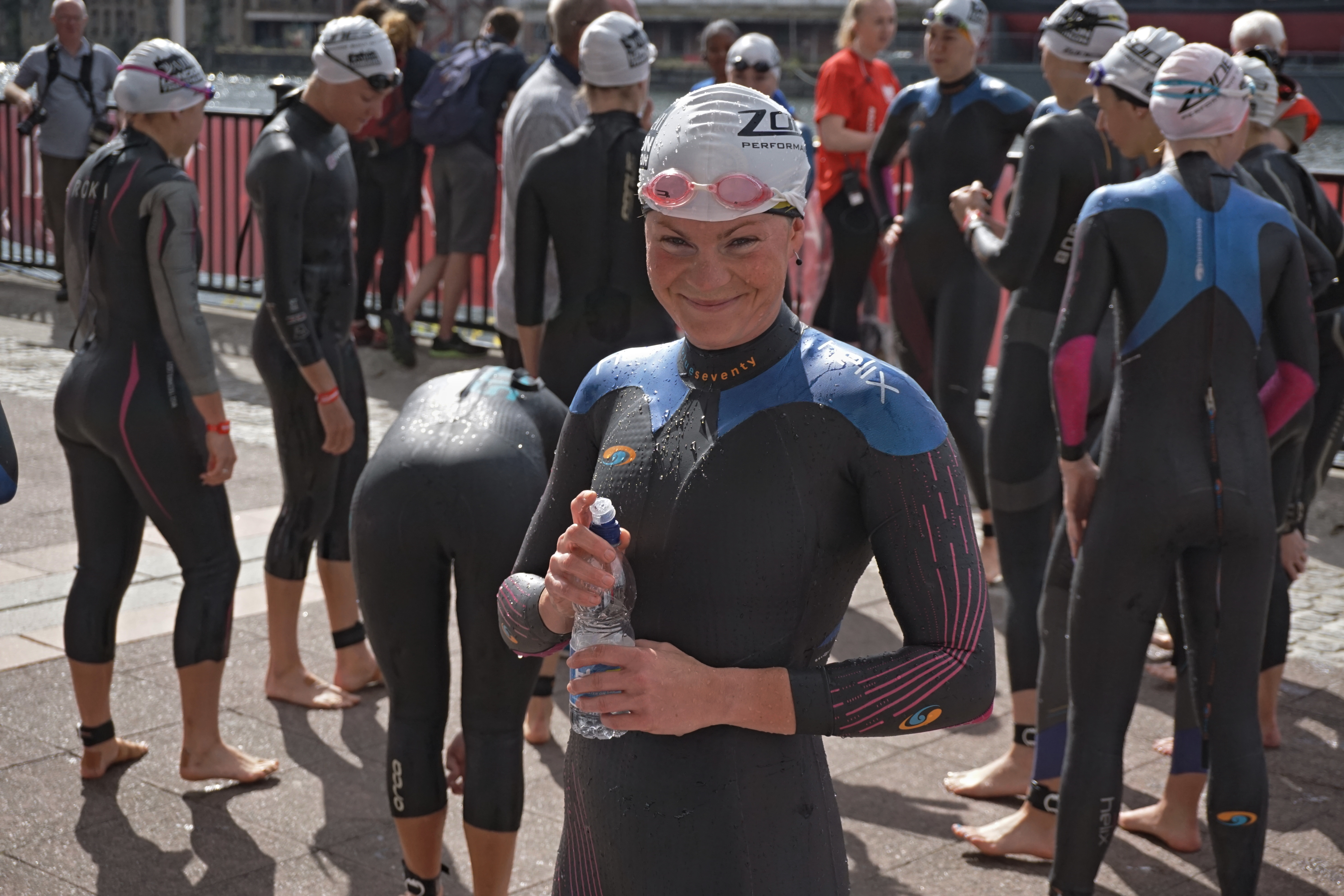
London Triathlon 2016

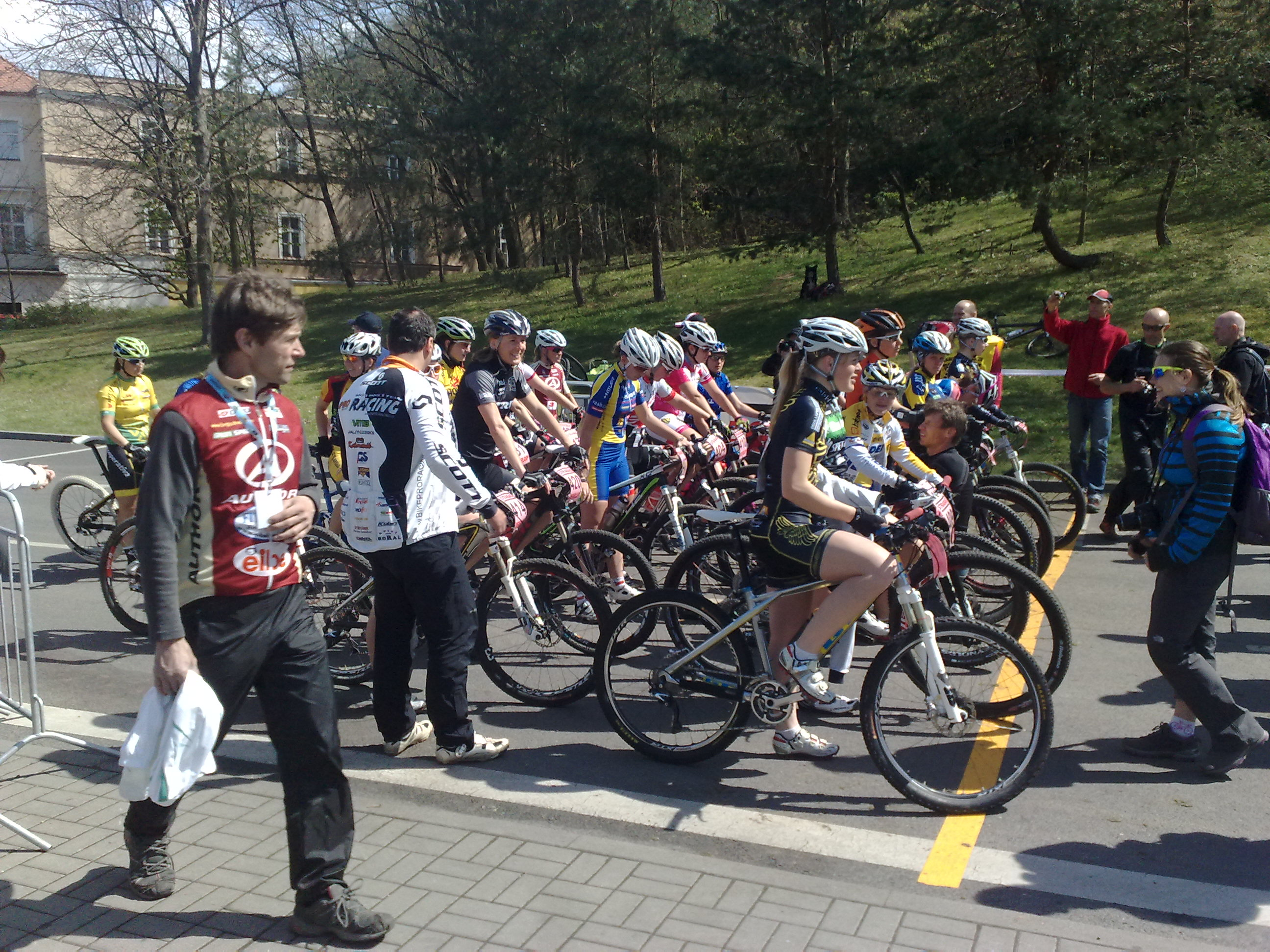
Kolářová in Teplice in 2012

Hana Kolářová (born 11 February 1988) is a Czech professional triathlete. She is awarded as a junior national champion in 2007 and the Czech Triathlon Series winner in 2012. She lives in the United Kingdom.

== Ironman competitions ==
Kolarova started as a challenger in the professional long distance triathlete division. She finished her first Ironman race in 2017 at Hever Castle Triathlon and came as 2nd. She took part on Challenge Family World Championships in 2019. Apart from that, she finished 10th. In Challenge Mallorca 2018 and Challenge Heilbronn 2019, 8th. In Challenge Davos 2019 and Challenge Mallorca 2019, 13th.

== UK Elite competitions ==
She was 11th at the British Elite National Championship 2017, and 9th at the London Triathlon 2018

== ITU Competitions ==
Kolářová started competing internationally in 2005 at ETU Triathlon Junior European Championships (Alexandropolis, Greece). She took 30th place at Junior Women race and 11th at Junior Women relay. 2 years later, she came 7th when she competed at the ETU Triathlon Junior European Cup (Vienna, Austria) as Junior Women. Later that year, she also joined the Triathlon World Championships (Hamburg, Germany) and came 46th. In 2008-2011, she fought under the U23 category and came 23rd at ETU Triathlon U23 European Championships (Tarzo, Italy) and 35th at ITU Triathlon World Championship Grand Final (Budapest, Hungary).

Kolářová has 17 ITU race starts. In 2012, she came 9th at ETU Cross Triathlon European Championships (Den Haag, Netherlands). Her best international triathlon result is 10th place at ITU Triathlon European Cup 2008 in Karlovy Vary (CZE).

== Cycling competitions ==
Kolářová is also a successful road cyclist and mountain biker. She won University National Championships in 2012 in road cycling. She took part at the UCI road cycling World cup Gracia–Orlová and Tour de Feminin in 2013. She bagged the 3rd place at marathon MTB National Championships in 2013.

== Personal life ==
Kolářová is a mechanical engineer by profession. She graduated in 2015 at the University of West Bohemia, Faculty of Mechanical Engineering in Plzeň, Czech Republic with a Masters of Engineering. She lives in London, United Kingdom. She is member of German professional triathlon bundesliga team .
