= Hana Purkrábková =

Czech ceramist and sculptor

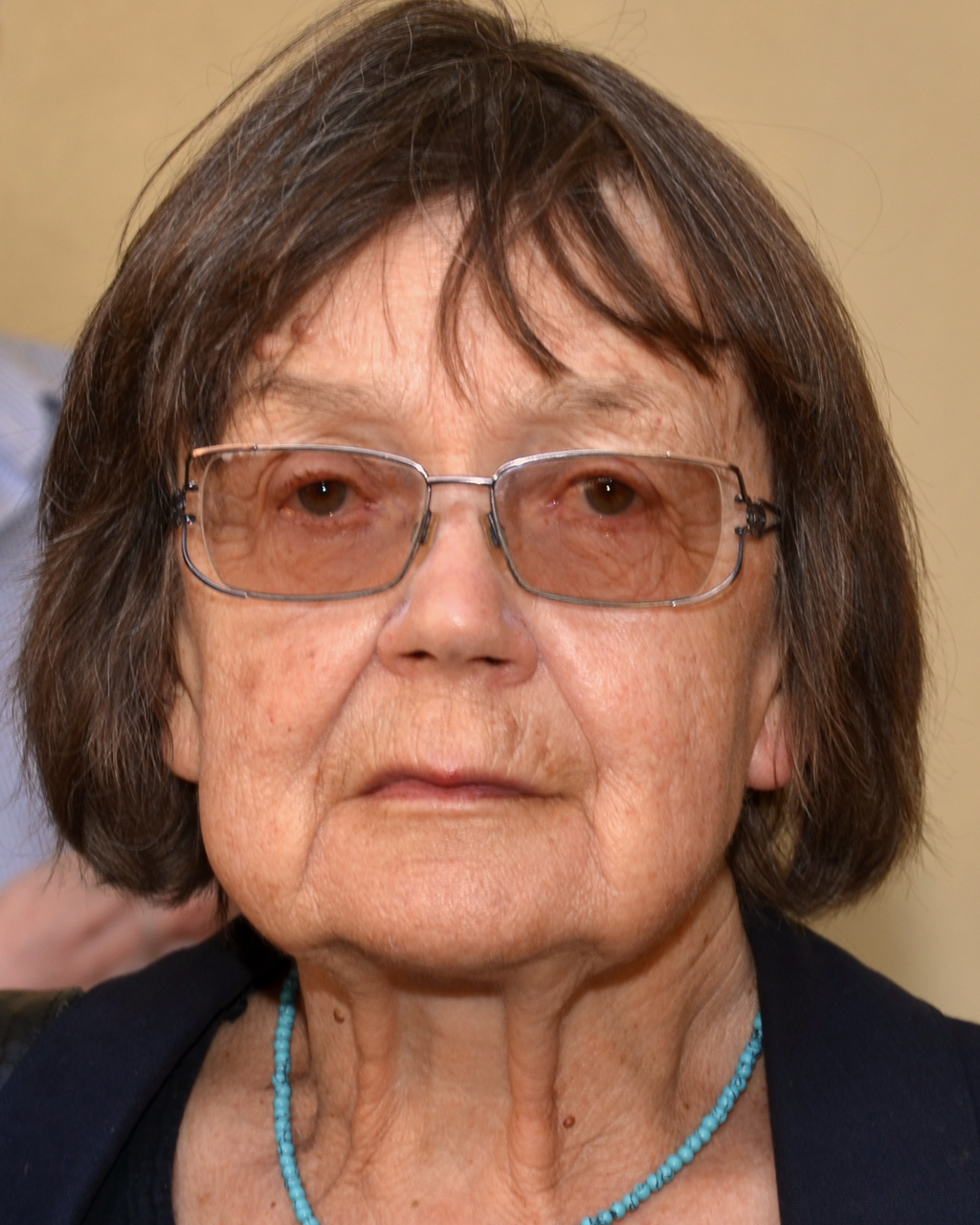
- Hana Purkrábková (2017
- Born: 19 August 1936; Tábor
- Died: 14 January 2019 (aged 82); Prague
- Education: Academy of Arts, Architecture and Design in Prague
- Known for: sculpture, ceramics
- Awards: Gold medal, International Ceramics Exhibition in Gualdo Tadino, Italy (1986)
- Website: example.com

Hana Purkrábková (19 August 1936, Tábor – 14 January 2019, Prague) was a Czech ceramist and sculptor.

== Biography ==
After finishing primary school in Tábor, she studied at the Secondary Industrial Ceramic School in Bechyně from 1951 to 1955. The school under the guidance of chemist Ing. Petrů had an excellent teaching staff at that time (the head of the art department was academic sculptor Prof. Bohumil Dobiáš) and was characterized by a liberal atmosphere. From there she was accepted to the Academy of Arts, Architecture and Design in Prague to the studio of professor Jan Kavan, where she met Karel Pauzer.

After graduating in 1961, she was employed in the ceramics workshop of the Central Office of Arts and Crafts in Štěchovice (formerly the David family's business), and until 1969 she also carried out her free work there.

In 1962–1969 she took part in several exhibitions of young artists in Prague, the International Ceramic Symposium at the Václav Špála Gallery, an exhibition in Amsterdam and the important New Figuration exhibition at Mánes Gallery in Prague.

From 1969 onwards, she worked only freely in the studio she and Karel Pauzer built together in Brunšov. After the Warsaw Pact invasion of Czechoslovakia, and the following period of "normalization", she exhibited mostly ceramics and occasionally sculptures at joint exhibitions. Her first solo exhibition (together with V. Boudníková) took place in 1977 in Týn nad Vltavou, while a solo exhibition with Karel Pauzer took place in 1988, in Atrium Gallery in Prague. She participated in unofficial exhibitions in the 1980s and contributed to the anthology "Grey Brick" published by the Jazz Section in 1985. In 1986 she received a gold medal at the International Ceramics Exhibition in Gualdo Tadino, Italy. Since 1992 she has been a member of the renewed Umělecká beseda arts association and of the Association of Ceramic Artists. She lived and worked in Brunšov.

=== Awards ===
- 1962 Honorable mention at the International Ceramics Exhibition in Prague
- 1986 Gold medal, International Ceramics Exhibition in Gualdo Tadino, Italy

== Work ==
She creates her works almost exclusively in ceramic and fire clay, keeping the colour of the material and the raw surface or finishing them with patina and fine polychromy.

Her lifelong theme is the figure, the psychology of human expressions and situations. At the beginning, when she created chamber sculptures in parallel with utilitarian ceramics spun on the potter's wheel, she loosely followed the legacy of the previous generation of sculptors in terms of modelling, colour and civil matter-of-factness, but in terms of expression, stylisation and conception she already co-created the aesthetics of the New figuration.

The artist does not depict faces, but human types; she is not interested in specific features, but in generalizing parables of human smallness, imperfection and minor vices. She catches people in banal or embarrassing situations, sometimes with sympathy and understanding (a group of seated ladies), sometimes with irony and exaggeration (eaters, sloths and dreamers).

However, the author is completely merciless in her expressive or grotesque portrayal of various heads, loudmouths and observers, whose human smallness is evident despite their horrible gesticulation. Their counterparts are the passive-looking half-figures of citizens or sleepers.

The world of humans and animals, at the beginning of the work depicted in general situations and relationships (Friendly Dog, Master and Dog), eventually merges and fuses into the chimera of an animal with a human face – an unkind symbol of the Candidate of our time.

=== Gallery ===
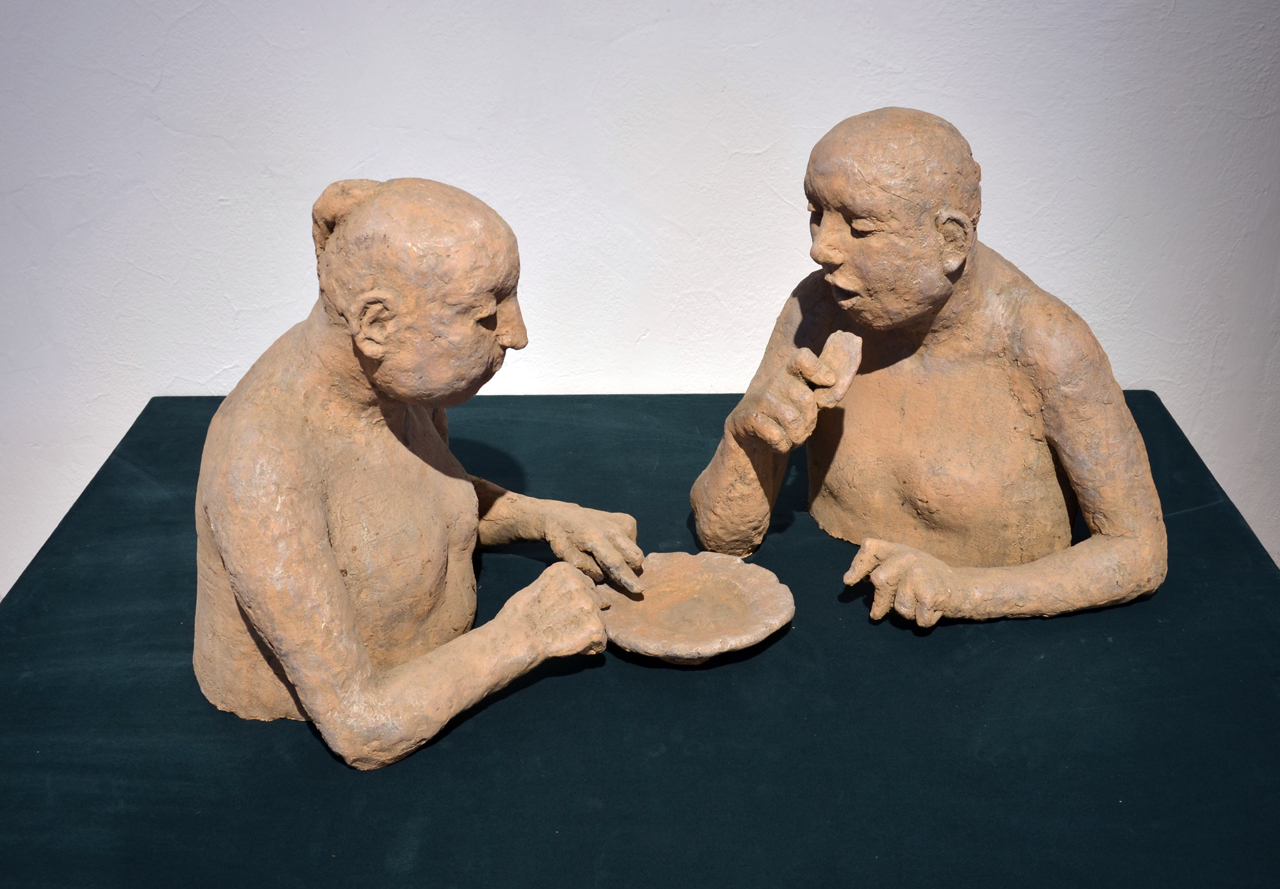
Hana Purkrábková, Tasting in silence, 1997

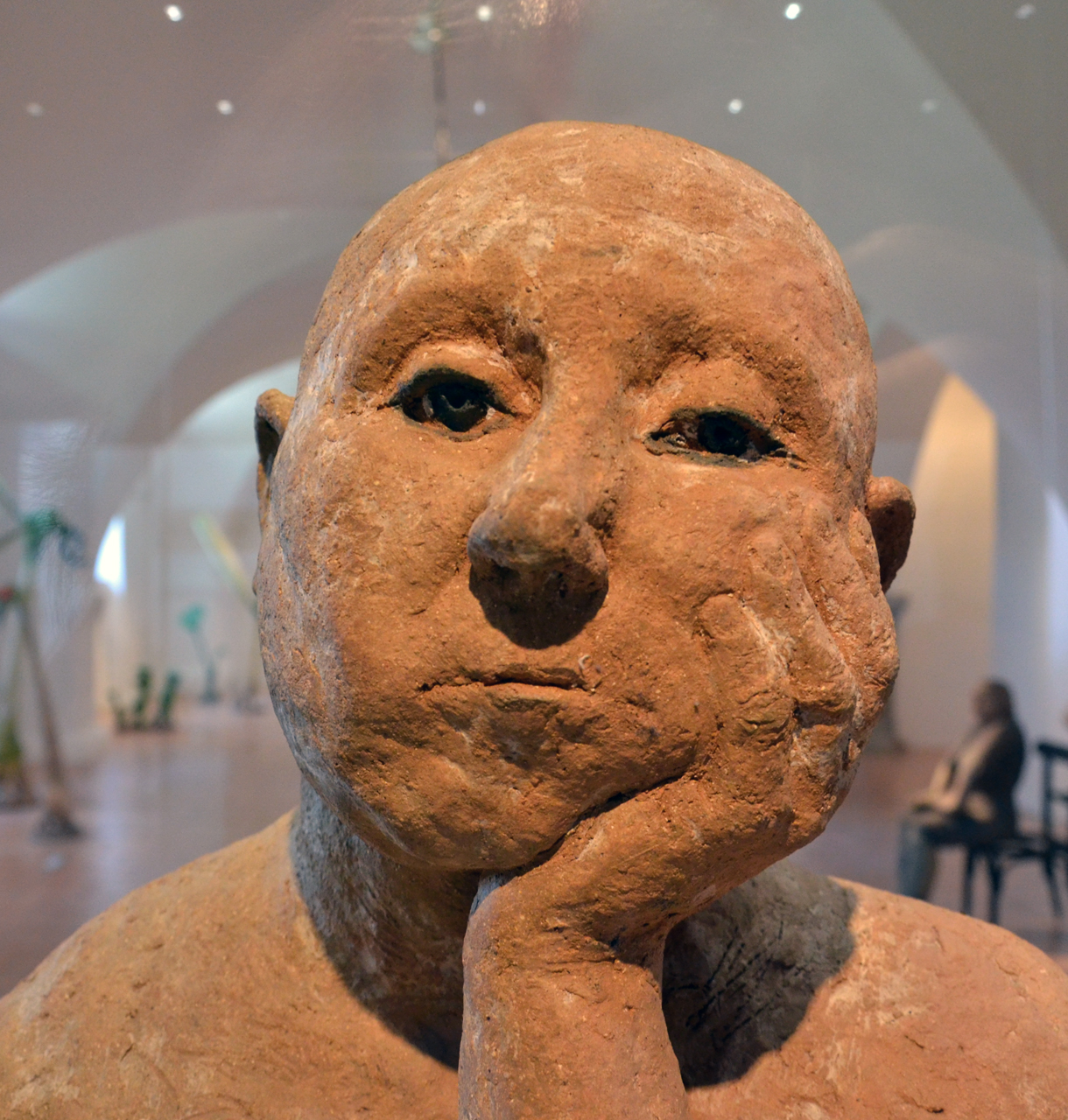
Hana Purkrábková, Pensive (detail), 2009

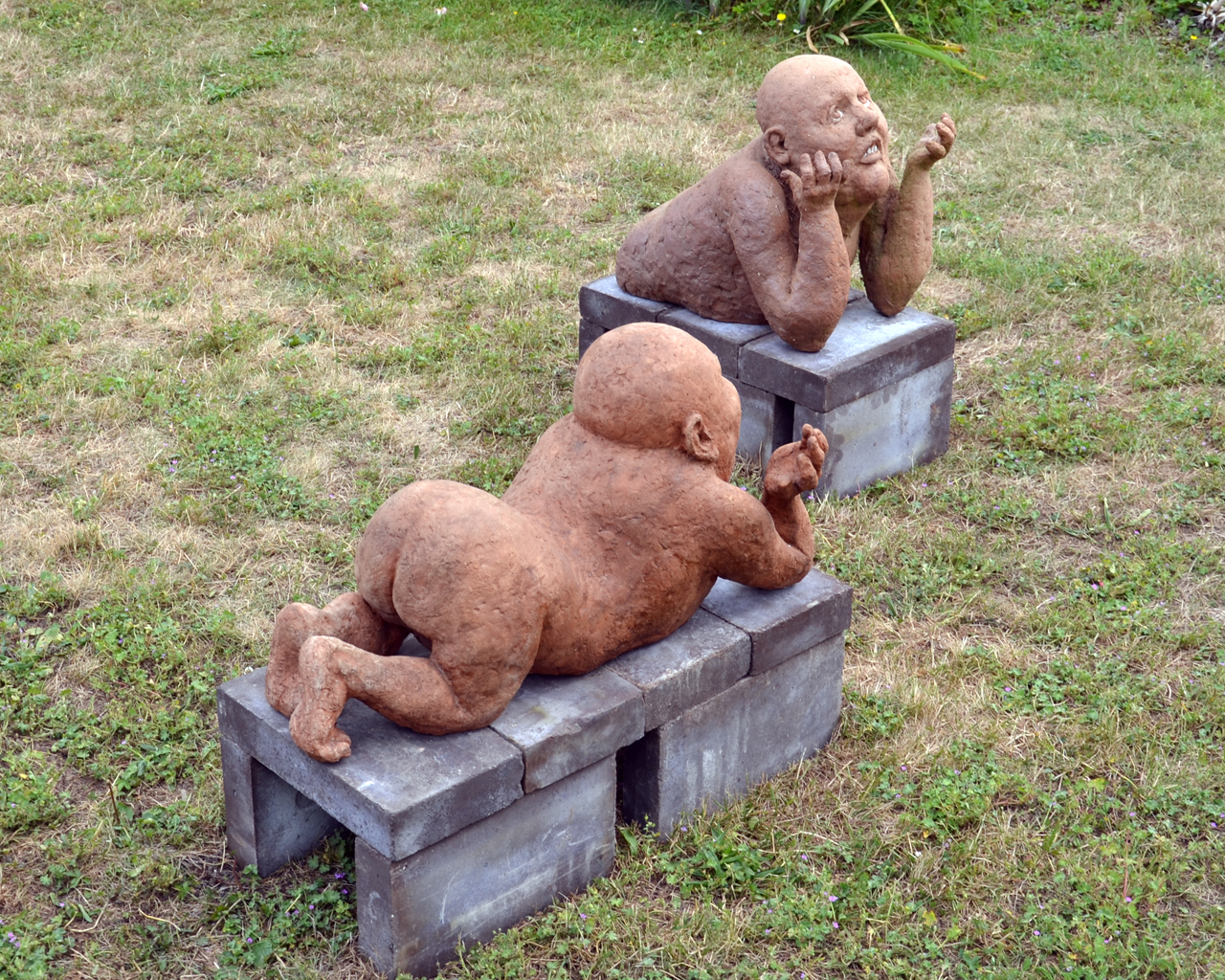
Hana Purkrábková, Lamenting Inchworm-men 2013

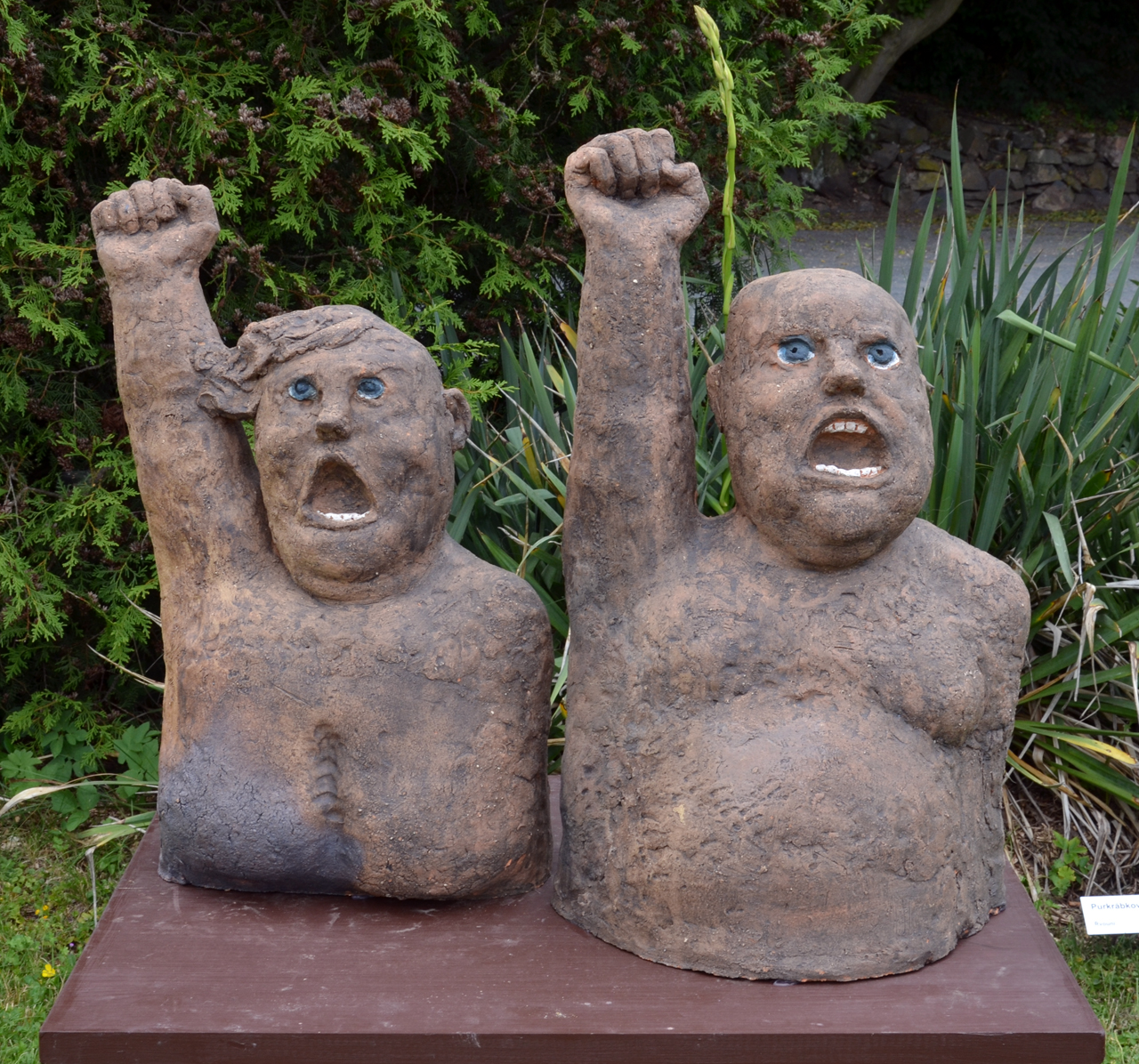
Hana Purkrábková, Roaring, 2014

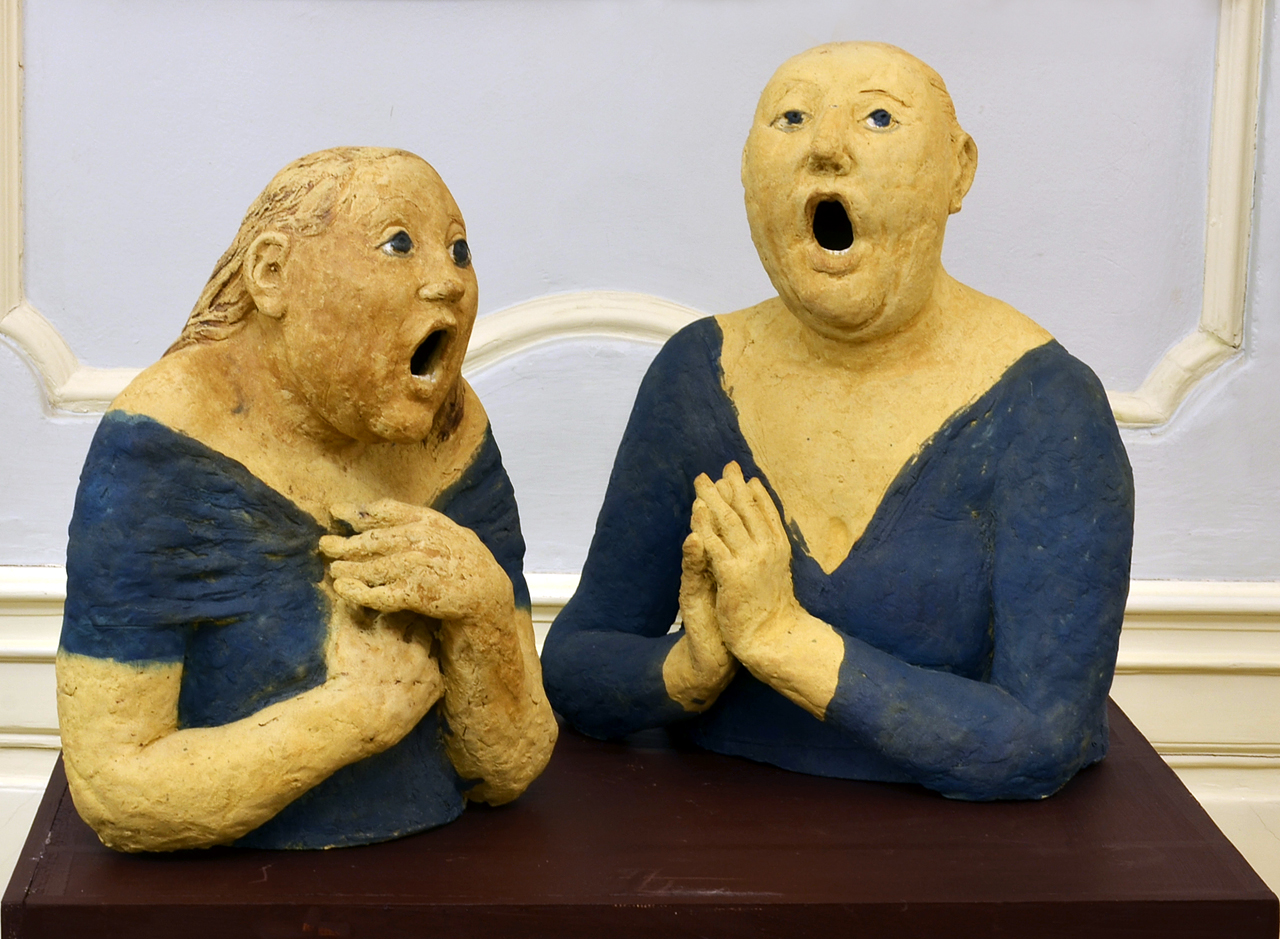
Hana Purkrábková, Singer I and II, 2015

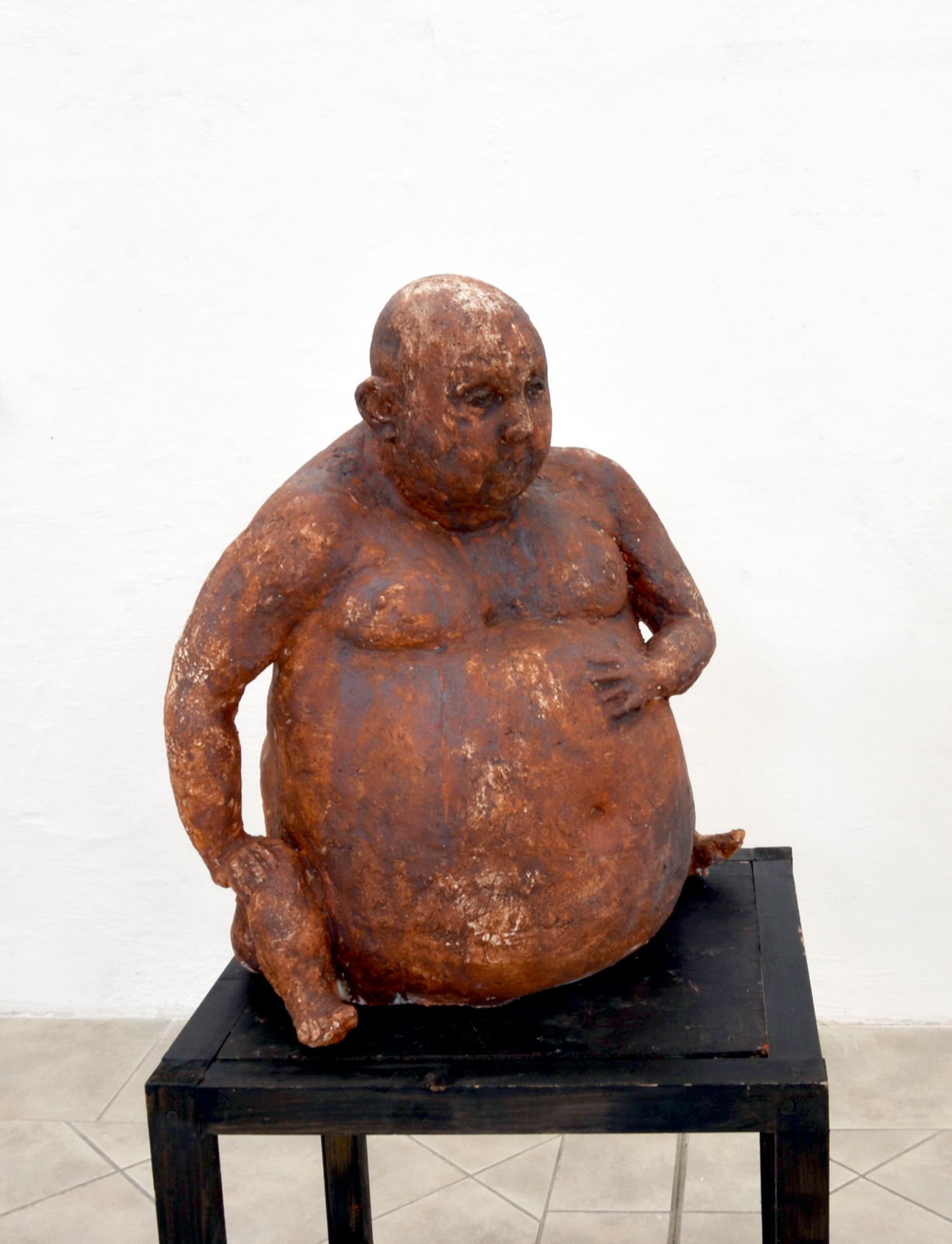
Hana Purkrábková, Fatty (2015-2017)

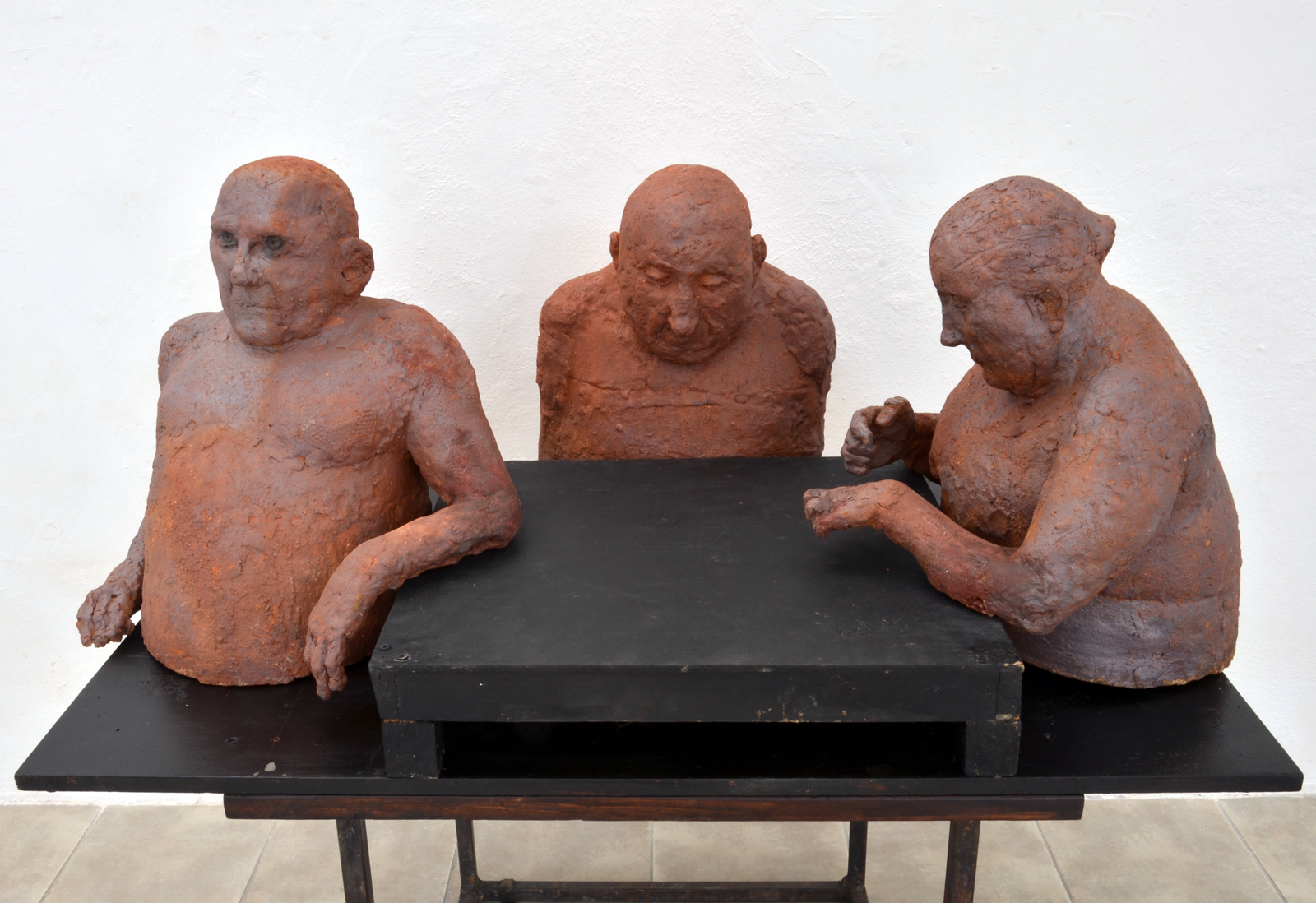
Hana Purkrábková, Three at the Table (2016-2017)

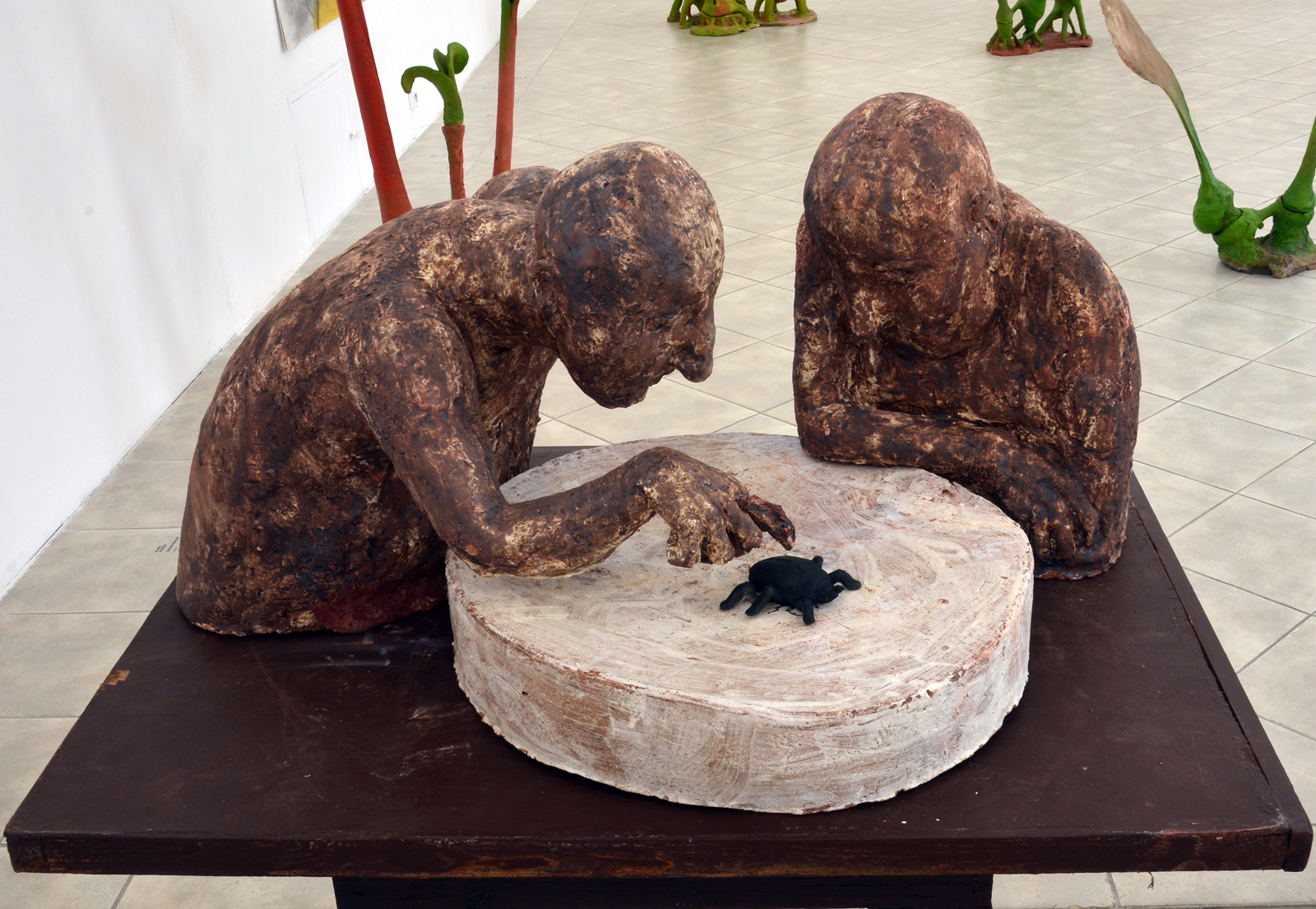
Hana Purkrábková, The Entomologist (2016-2017)
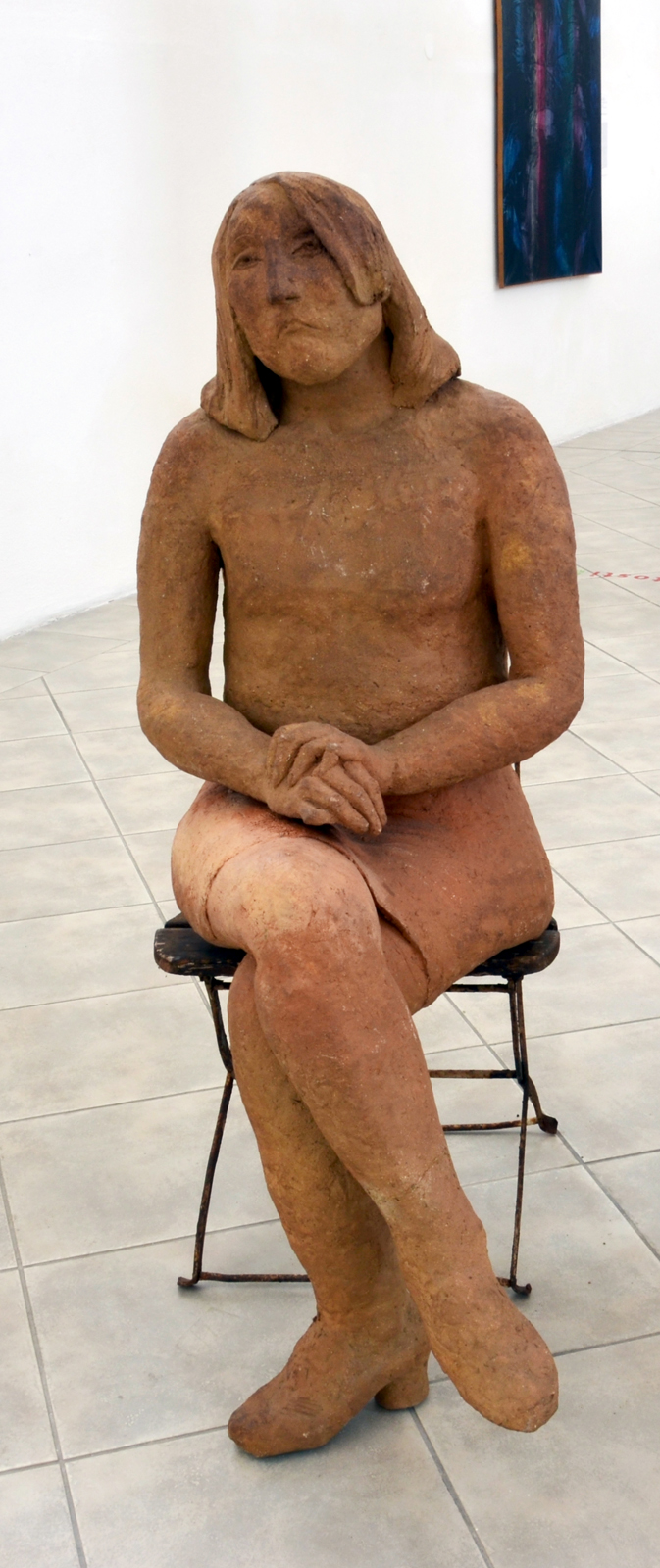
In the waiting room (1995-2012) a

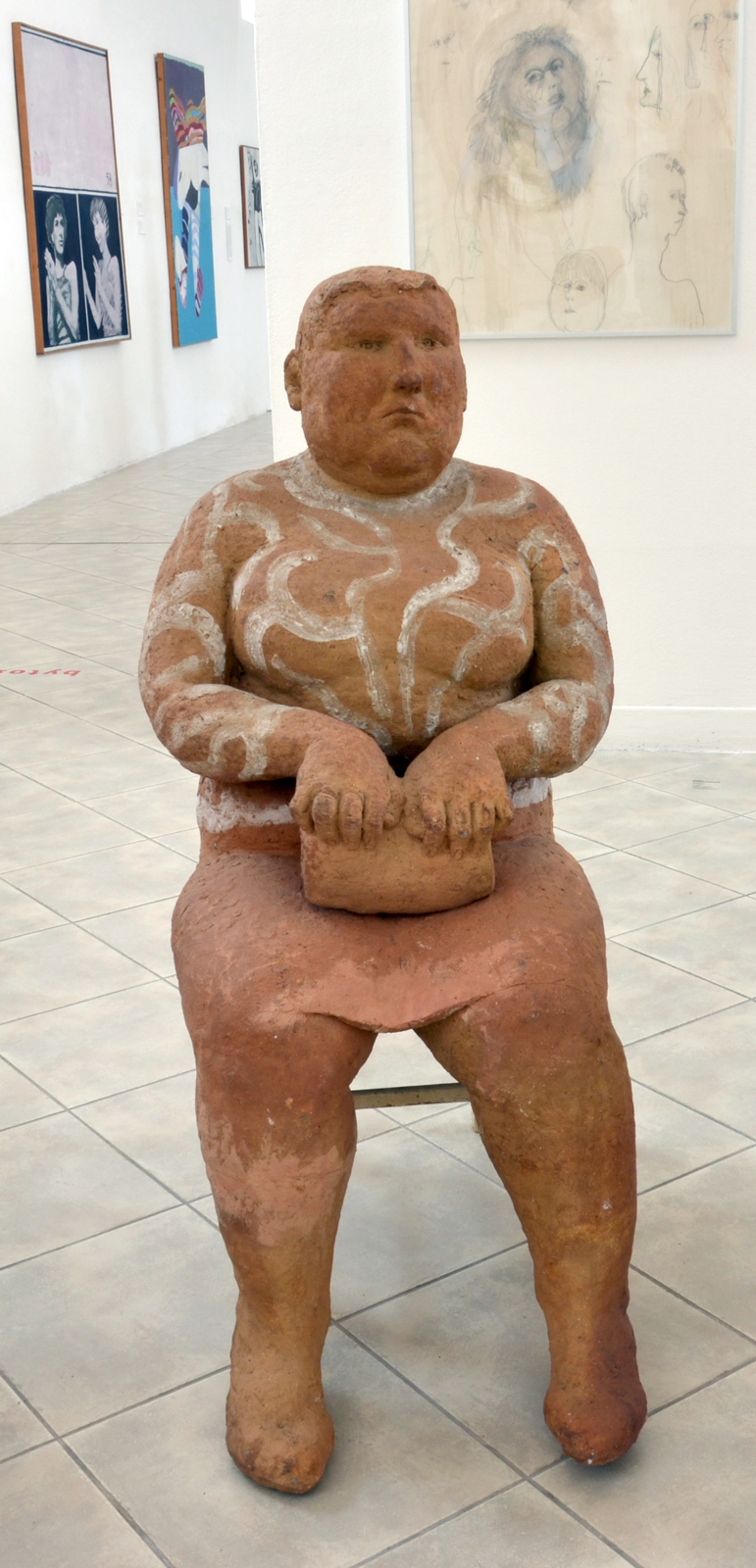
In the waiting room (1995-2012) b

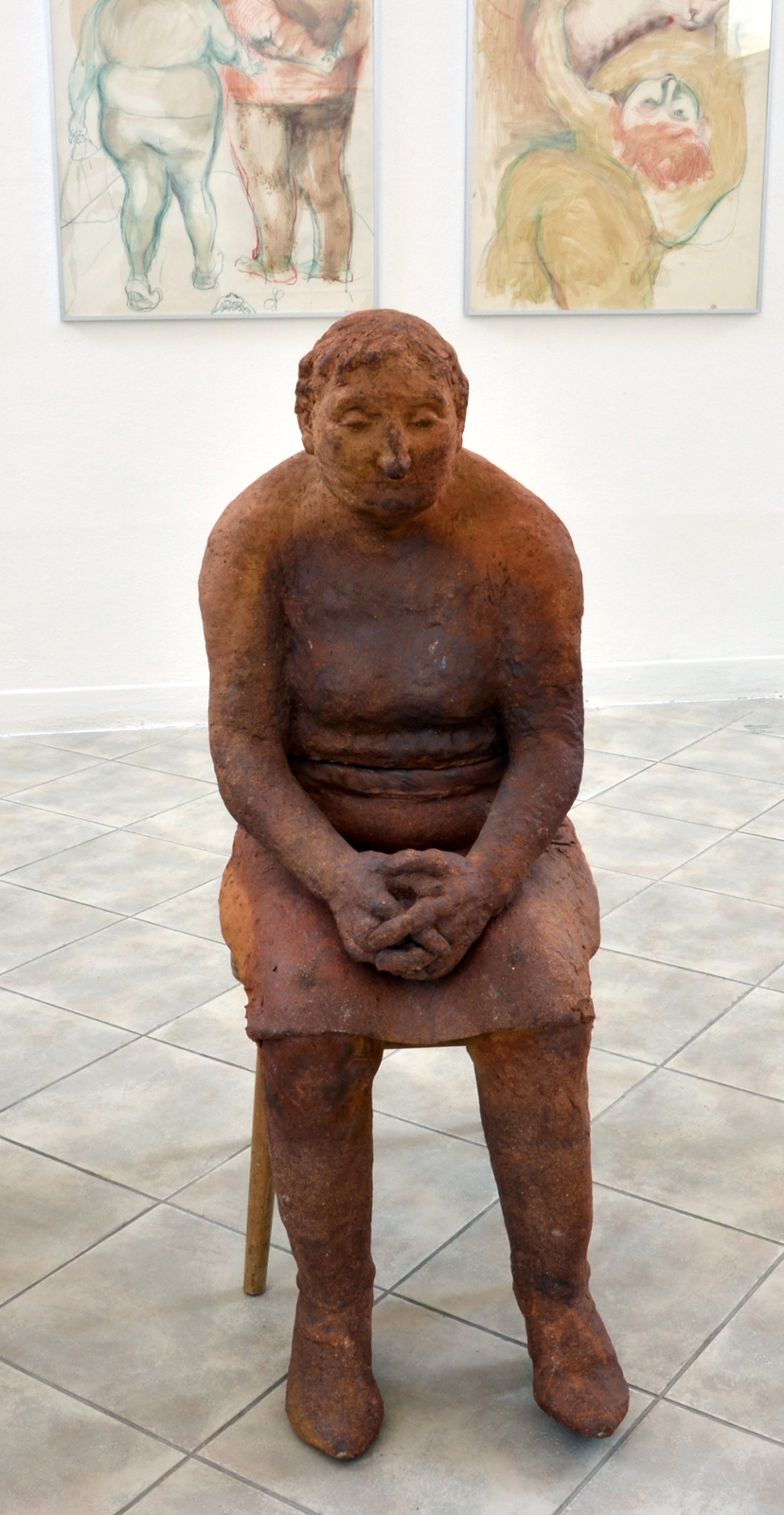
In the waiting room (1995-2012) c

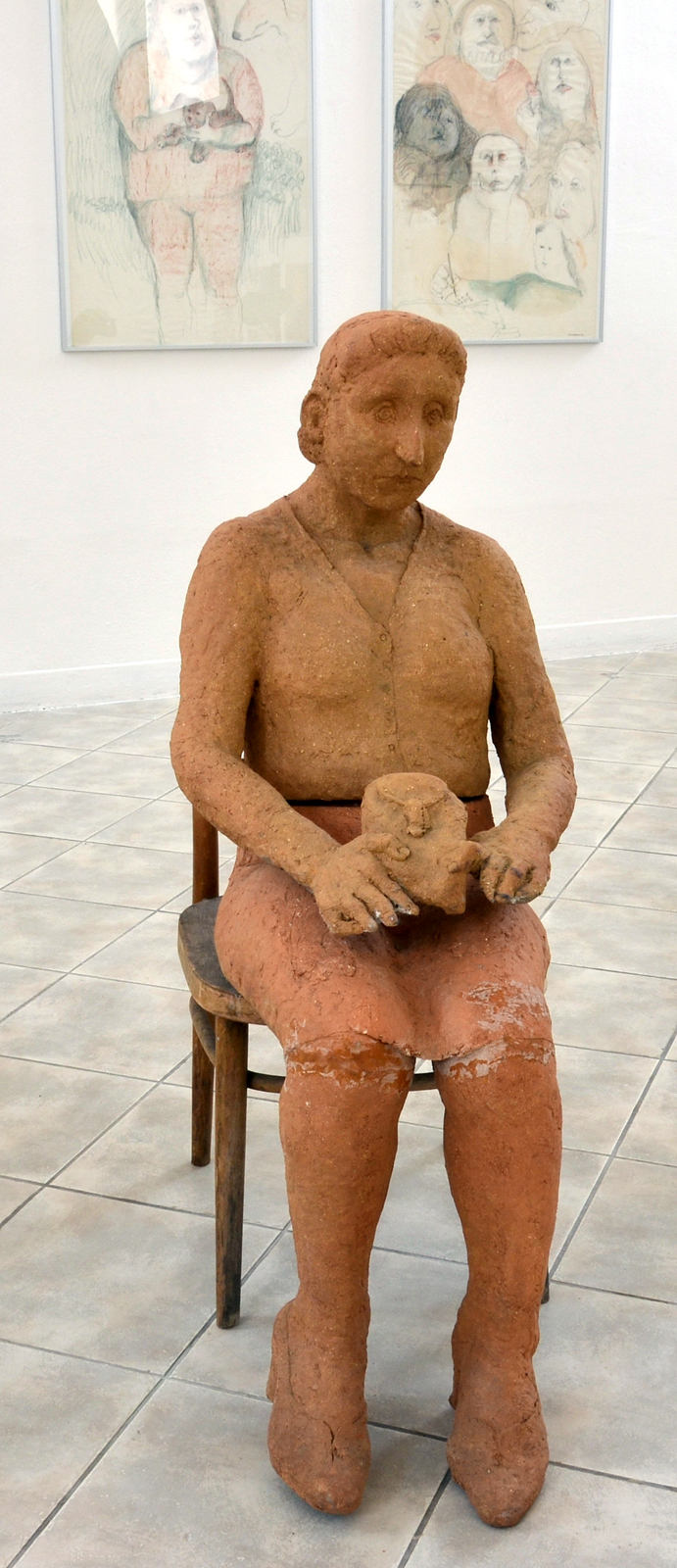
In the waiting room (1995-2012) d

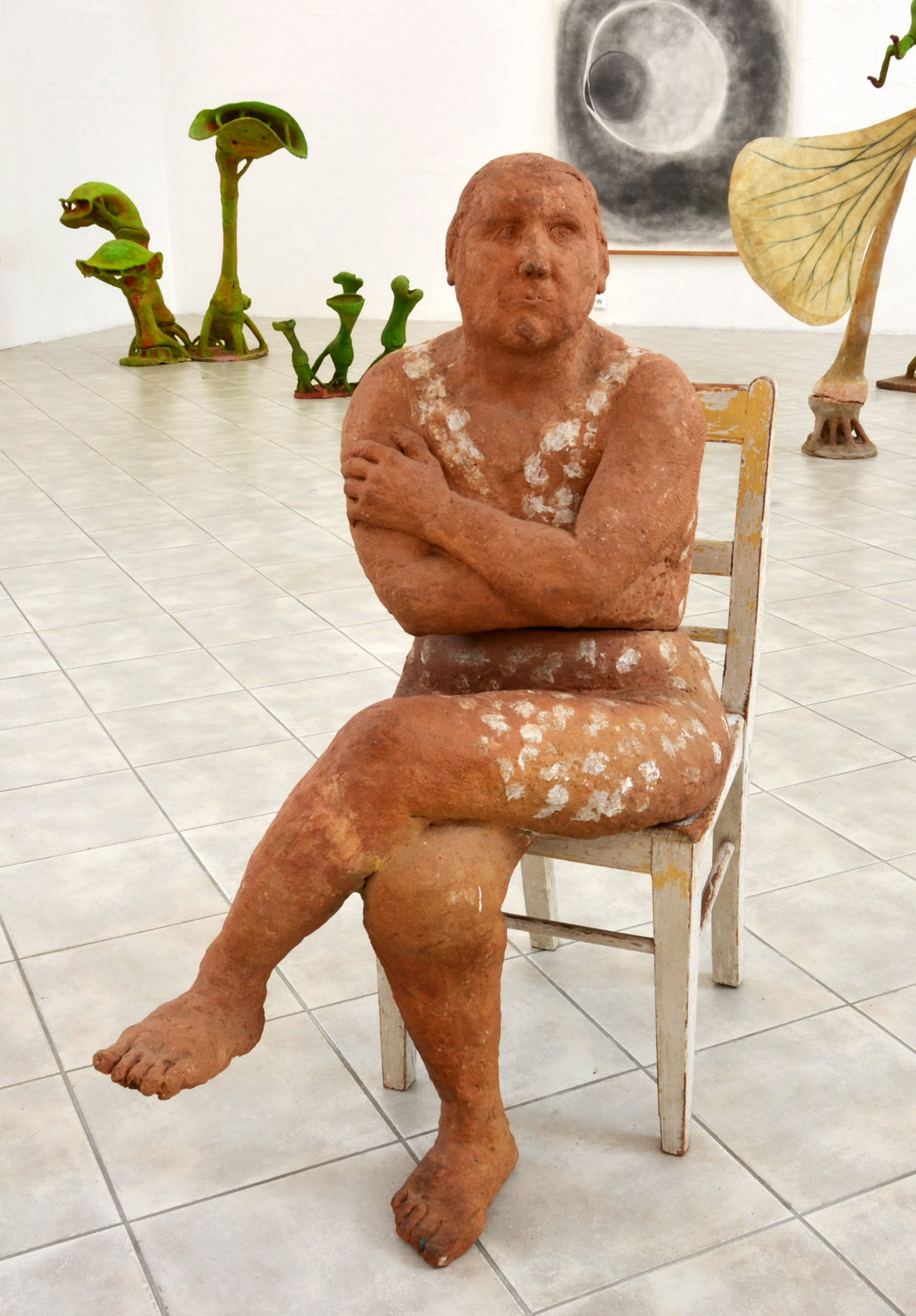
In the waiting room (1995-2012) e

=== Representation in collections ===
- Clay Studio, Philadelphia
- Gualdo Tadino Gallery
- National Gallery in Prague
- Moravian Gallery in Brno
- Museum of Decorative Arts in Prague
- Municipal Gallery in Brno
- Alš South Bohemian Gallery in Hluboká nad Vltavou
- Gallery of Fine Arts in Cheb
- North Bohemian Gallery of Fine Arts in Litoměřice
- Ceramic Collection in Bechyně
- Gallery of Modern Art in Roudnice nad Labem
- City Museum and Gallery in Hranice
- Horácké Museum in Nové Město na Moravě

=== Selected exhibitions ===
==== Author´s exhibitions ====
- 1977 Hana Purkrábková, Týn nad Vltavou Museum (with Vera Boudníková)
- 1983 Hana Purkrábková: Ceramic sculpture, Museum Bechyně
- 1988 Hana Purkrábková: Sculptures, Karel Pauzer: Drawings, Sculptures, Atrium Gallery, Prague
- 1992 Hana Purkrábková: Sculptures, Litera Gallery, Prague
- 1993 Hana Purkrábková: Sculptures, Aleš South Bohemian Gallery in Bechyně
- 1998 Hana Purkrábková: Sleepers and Others, Rich Art Gallery, Chrudim
- 2002 Hana Purkrábková: Sculture e disegni, Art...on paper, Lugano, Italy
- 2004 Karel Pauzer: A little bit of natural history, Hana Purkrábková: Selected Society, North Bohemian Gallery of Fine Arts in Litoměřice
- 2005 Hana Purkrábková: Selected Society, Art Gallery Karlovy Vary, Aleš South Bohemian Gallery in Bechyně
- 2005 Hana Purkrábková: Small Society, Art Gallery, Chrudim
- 2006 Hana Purkrábková: It Doesn't Get Any Better, Navrátil Gallery, Prague
- 2011 Hana Purkrábková: Half-Losses, Art Gallery, Chrudim
- 2011/12 Hana Purkrábková: Temporary stay, Navrátil Gallery, Prague
- 2012 Hana Purkrábková: Selected Society, Gallery of Fine Arts in Havlíčkův Brod
- 2016 Hana Purkrábková, Karel Pauzer / Seeing Life, Gallery at the White Unicorn, Klatovy
- 2017 Karel Pauzer / Hana Purkrábková: Creatures, Gallery of Modern Art, Roudnice nad Labem

==== Joint exhibitions ====
- 1962 World Ceramics Exhibition, Prague
- 1966 Exhibition of the Young / Exposition des jeunes, House of the Lords of Kunštát, Brno
- 1967 Exhibition of the Young ´67, Exhibition Hall of the Institute of Arts, Prague
- 1968 Youth Exhibition ´68, Exhibition Hall of the Institute of Art and Design, Prague
- 1968 Intersymposium Czechoslovakia – Ceramics Bechyně 68, Václav Špála Gallery, Prague
- 1969 New Figuration, Mánes Gallery, Prague
- 1969 Zestien Tsjechische kunstenaars. Dertien grafici en drie keramisten, Galerie de Tor, Amsterdam
- 1970 Contemporary Czechoslovak Art, Piran, Zagreb, Ljubljana
- 1976 The Image of Man in Ceramics, Moravian Gallery in Brno
- 1984 Moderne Keramik Tschechoslowakischer Künstler, Keramion, Museum für zeitgenössische keramische Kunst, Frechen
- 1987 Ceramic Sculpture from Czechoslovakia, Lee Sclar Gallery, Morristown
- 1988 International Ceramics Exhibition in Gualdo Tadino, Italy
- 1988 Ceramics 88, Palace of Culture, Prague
- 1989 Smile, Joke and Grin, Palace of Culture, Prague
- 1991 Tschechische Keramik, Hetjens-Museum/Deutsches Keramikmuseum, Düsseldorf
- 1992 Contemporary East European Ceramics, The Clay Studio, Philadelphia
- 1992 Acquisitions of 20th Century Czech Art 1989–1992, Prague Castle Riding Hall, Prague
- 1992 Kunstmarkt '92, Galerie Brigitte Knyrim, Regensburg
- 1993/94 New Figuration, North Bohemian Gallery of Fine Arts in Litoměřice, East Bohemian Gallery in Pardubice, Moravian Gallery in Brno, House of Art in Opava, Regional Gallery of Highlands in Jihlava
- 1994 Fünf tschechische Keramiker, Galerie L, Hamburg
- 1995/96 Tschechische Keramik, Ehemalige Synagoge, Sandhausen, Galerie für Englische Keramik Sandhausen
- 1996/97 Umění zastaveného čas / Art when time stood still, Czech Art Scene 1969–1985, Prague, Brno, Cheb
- 1998 Die Menschliche Figur / The Human Figure – Eine Ausstellung in Zwei Teilen / An Exhibition in Two Parts, Kunstforum Kirchberg
- 1999 The Art of Accelerated Time. Czech Art Scene 1958 – 1968, Prague, Cheb
- 2000 Material: Erde, Grösse: Klein (Keramische Plastik)/Material: Earth, Size: Small (Ceramic Sculpture), Kunstforum Kirchberg
- 2001 ...about people..., Czech Museum of Fine Arts, Bayer & Bayer Gallery, Prague
- 2001 Coloured Sculpture, North Bohemian Gallery of Fine Arts in Litoměřice
- 2005 Osteuropäische Keramik – Geforme Erde, Oberpfälzer Künstlerhaus, Schwandorf
- 2006 Czech Art of the 20th Century 1940 – 1970, Aleš South Bohemian Gallery in Hluboká nad Vltavou
- 2010 Crazy Colorful World, Millennium Gallery, Prague
- 2012 Summer Ceramic Sculpture, Klenová
- 2014 Phenomenon B, International Museum of Ceramics AJG, Bechyně
- 2015 Summer Ceramic Sculpture, Roztoky Museum
- 2016 Summer Ceramic Sculpture, Roztoky Museum
- 2017 Summer Ceramic Sculpture, Roztoky Museum
- 2018 Summer ceramic sculpture, Roztoky Museum
- 2019 Contact: International Symposium of Ceramics Bechyně 1966–2018, Kvalitář Gallery, Prague

== Sources ==
=== Books ===
- Contemporary Ceramics, Růžička M, Vlček T, 1979, Odeon (71 p.)
- Durdisová S et al., translation Steven Conway, Art in Investment and Postal Bank, 305 p., Prague 1998
- New Encyclopaedia of Czech Fine Arts, Horová A et al., 1995, Academia, ISBN 80-200-0522-6
- Dictionary of Czech and Slovak visual artists 1950 – 2003, Chagall Art Centre, Ostrava 2003, ISBN 80-86171-17-5

=== Catalogues ===
- Hana Purkrábková, Jan Kříž, cat. 20 p., Gallery of Fine Arts in Cheb 1985
- Hana Purkrábková, 1991, cat. 4 p., ČFVU Prague
- Hana Purkrábková: Ceramic Sculpture, 1992, Růžička Milouš, cat. 8 p., Aleš South Bohemian Gallery in Hluboká nad Vltavou
- Hana Purkrábková: Sculptures, 1992, Neumannová Švaňková Eva, cat. 4+1 p., Litera Gallery, Prague
- Hana Purkrábková. Karel Pauzer, Moravian Gallery in Brno 1993
- Hana Purkrábková: Sleepers and Others, 1998, Novotná Jarmila, cat. 4 p., Rich Art Gallery, Chrudim
- Hana Purkrábková – Selected Company, Karel Pauzer – A Little bit of Natural History, 2004, Milena Klasová, Eva Petrová and Kristián Suda, North Bohemian Gallery of Fine Arts in Litoměřice
- Hana Purkrábková, 2005, Galerie Magna Ostrava
- Hana Purkrábková, Karel Pauzer: Beings, A. Potůčková, cat. 54 p., Gallery of Modern Art in Roudnice nad Labem 2017
