= Hana Malhas =

Jordanian singer-songwriter

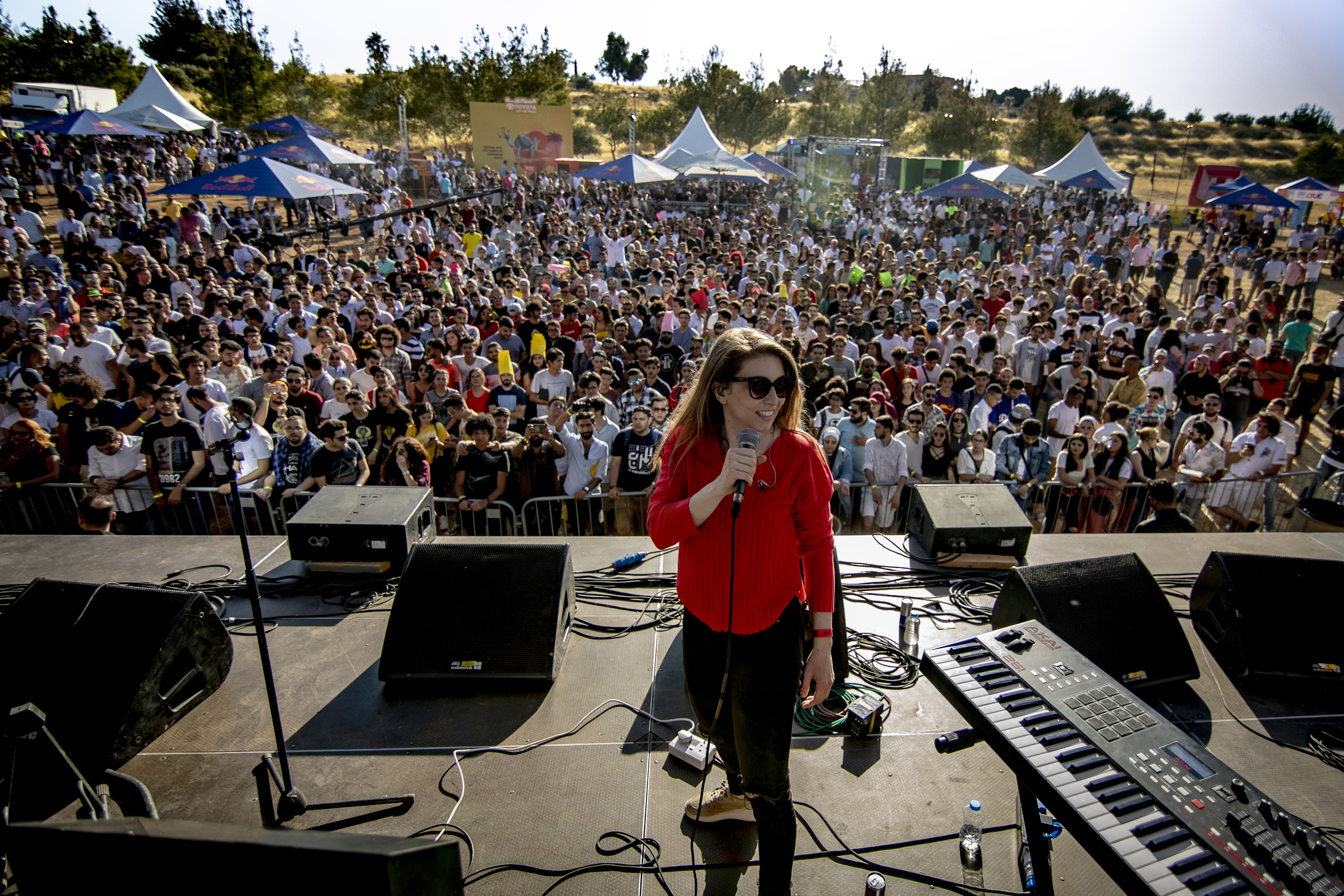
- Hana Malhas in concert, 2019
- Born: Hana Malhas; Jordan
- Occupations: Singer-songwriter; Musician
- Years active: 2010–present
- Musical career
- Origin: Amman, Jordan
- Genres: Pop; electronic
- Website: www.hanamalhas.com

Hana Malhas is a Jordanian singer-songwriter and musician. In 2013, Malhas launched a monthly concert series called "Bala Feesh" (Arabic for "unplugged") inviting alternative Arab musicians to perform. Malhas released her first EP Shapeshift in 2010, and her second EP 'Hana Malhas & the Overthinkers' in 2012, both consisting of songs in the English language. Her track "Nasi", an Arabic single she released as part of her first full-length album of the same name in 2018, was featured in Universal Records' Mena compilation Now: Best of Indie Arabia Volume II.
