= Hana Vejvodová =

Hana Vejvodová (11. July 1963, Prague–1. August 1994, Prague) was a Czech pianist and composer. She studied piano with Jaromir Kriz and composition with Ilja Hurnik, Svatopluk Havelka and Franco Donatoni.

== Works ==
Vejvodova composed 40 works for orchestra, voice and solo instruments. Selected works include:

Orchestral compositions:

- Serenade for Strings
- Passacaglia for Symphony Orchestra (1986)
- Deliranda – symphonic movement (1988–89)
- Arkanum – symphonic movement (1991–92)
- Concerto for Piano and Chamber Orchestra (1992–93)

Chamber compositions:

- Suite for Three Clarinets in B-flat (1985)
- Duets for flute and violin
- Wind Quartet
- Elegy for violin and organ
- Trio for Two flutes and Piano
- Brass Quintet (1988)
- Suite for oboe and piano
- Sonata for oboe and piano (1991)

Piano compositions:

- Five Piano Sketches
- Etude
- Sonatinas No. 1, 2, 3
- Sonata in C (1984)
- Sonata for four hands (1985)
- Partita Bizzara

'Sonata No. 2 "Confession" (1988–90),

- Ten Miniatures
- Eight Bagatelles (1993)
- Sonata No. 3 "Tribute to Nature" (1993–94)
- Sonata No. 4 "Fate" (1994)

Vocal music:

- Song of the Slain Lover
- Chants about the Death of an Empire, for mixed choir (1988)
- Fairy-tale for mixed choir
- Cycle of Three Love Song
- Pathways of Love for higher voice and piano

Music for children:

- Bouquet of Flowers (cycle of five songs for the youngest children)
- Watercolour Paintings (seven miniatures for piano, 1988)
- Animals' Ball (piano suite)
