= Hana Librová =

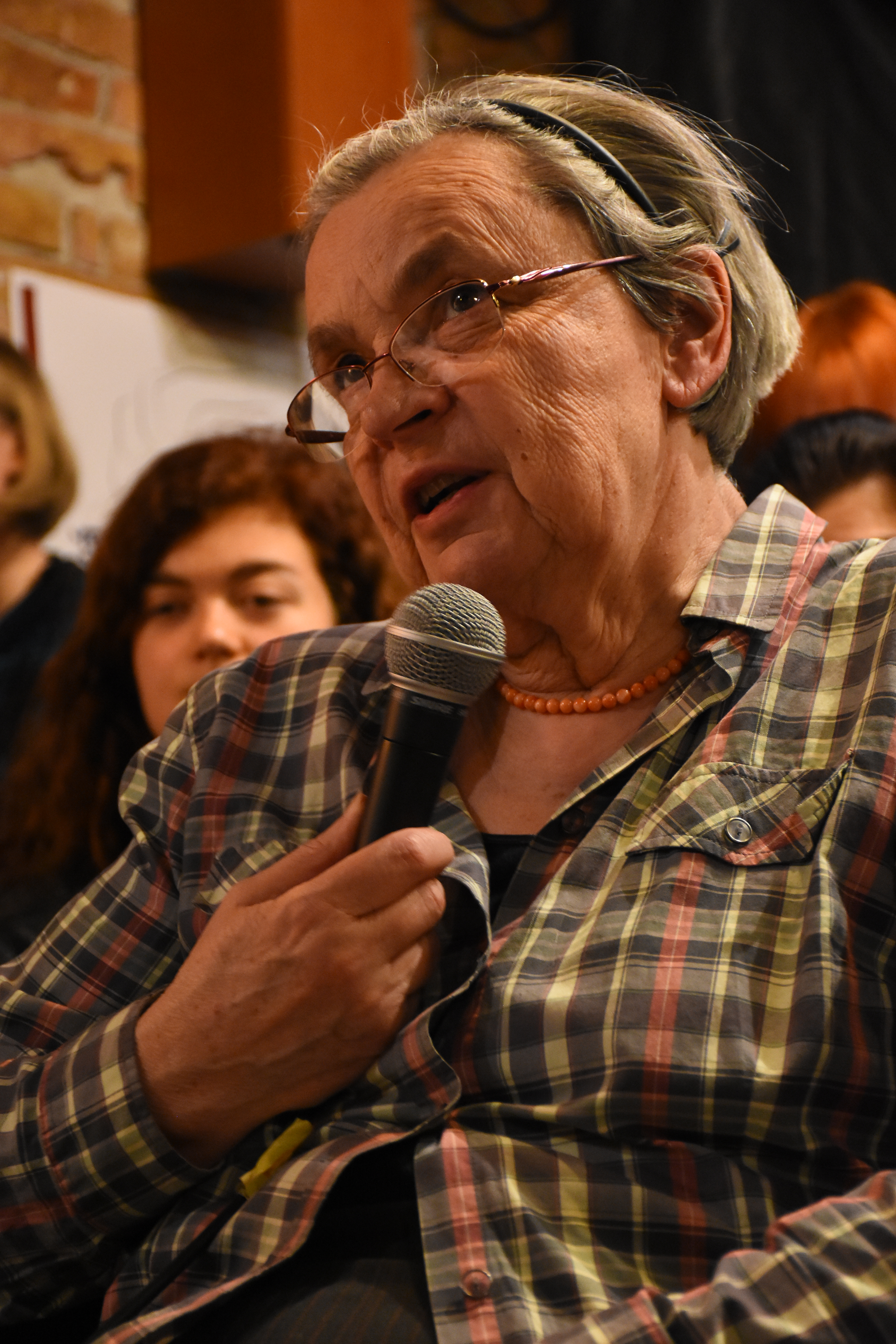
Hana Librová (2018)

Hana Librová (born 26 November 1943 in Brno, Protectorate of Bohemia and Moravia) is a Czech biologist and later sociologist and environmentalist. She contributed to the establishment of the Department of Environmental Studies at Masaryk University. She has carried out research on environmental lifestyle and environmental values.

== Biography ==
She studied biology at the Jan Evangelista Purkyně University (former name of Masaryk University). In 1968, she started working in the sociology department of Philosophical faculty of the Masaryk University, where she later established the subject of humanistic environmental studies. In 1997, she was appointed as a professor of sociology. In 1999 Hana Librová became the first head of the Department of Environmental Studies [3].

Hana Librová was awarded the Prize of Josef Vondruška which she was given by the Foundation of Charta 77 in 1998. She was nominated to the Prize of a chairman of the Grant Agency of the Czech republic in 2004

== Personal life ==
Hana Librová is a sister of prof. Jana Nechutová, classical philologist. She is married and has a daughter.

== Selected works ==
- Sociální potřeba a hodnota krajiny. Brno: Spisy FF UJEP, 1987, 135 s.
- Láska ke krajině?, Brno: Blok, 1988, 168 s.
- Pestří a zelení. Kapitoly o dobrovolné skromnosti, Brno: Hnutí Duha a Veronica, 1994, 218 s. ISBN 80-85368-18-8
- The Disparate Roots of Voluntary Modesty. Environmental values, 1999, No. 3, pp. 369–379. ISSN 0963-2719
- Vlažní a váhaví: Kapitoly o ekologickém luxusu. Brno: Doplněk, 2003, 320 s. ISBN 80-7239-149-6
- Proč chráníme přírodu?: Dvakrát na obhajobu ochránců přírody. Vesmír, 2005, č. 3, s. 171-177. ISSN 1214-4029
