= Hana Yousry =

Egyptian singer (born 1993)

- هنا يسري
- Born: Hana Ibrahim Yousry هنا إبراهيم يسري; 10 March 1993 (age 33); Cairo, Egypt
- Occupations: Singer; television judge; businesswoman
- Years active: 2017–present
- Musical career
- Genres: Arabic pop; romance; world
- Instrument: Vocals
- Label: Sony Music (distributor)

Hana Yousry (born 10 March 1993) is an Egyptian singer and actor.

== Her life and upbringing ==
Hana Ibrahim Yousry was born in Cairo on 10 March 1993. She is the daughter of the actor Ibrahim Yusri and the sister of the actor Mohamed Yousry. She studied in the field of marketing at a private university.

== Her career ==
She began her artistic activity after her father died when she was sixteen years old. Because of her father's urge for her to work outside the artistic community, she was apprenticed to the singer Samira Said. She began artistic activity here in 2017. She participated in acting in a number of artistic works, including The Family series in 2022, and the series The Eight in 2022. She gained fame here after singing "My Father’s Daughter" in the series "Family Topic," and participating in a rich duet with Medhat Saleh in front of Egyptian President Abdel Fattah El-Sisi during his attendance at the Egyptian Women's Celebration.

== Her works ==
As of 2024 she has 125,775 monthly listeners on Spotify. She has released four singles, with Fi 7eta Tanya gaining the highest streams of 2,949,016. Her latest song is هنا يسري – لو سامحنا, which was released on 9 February 2024.

=== Singing ===
She presented more than thirty solo songs here, in addition to duets with several singers. Her first album was presented at the beginning of the year 2024, with Sony Music Entertainment contracting to produce a full album that includes ten diverse songs, entitled (If We Forgive Us). The first songs of this album were released. Titled (If We Forgive Us), on 17 February 2024, written by Muhammad Al-Shafi’i, composed by Islam Refaat, arranged by Maher Al-Malakh, and filmed by the video clip, directed by Nidal Hani.

== Awards ==
She received the Excellence and Creativity Award from the Arab Satellite TV Festival, for the song Bint Abuya.
