= Černí baroni =

Černí baroni may refer to:

- Černí baroni (novel), a 1969 satirical novel written by Miloslav Švandrlík
- Černí baroni (film), a 1992 Czechoslovak comedy film
- Černí baroni (TV series), a Czech television series that aired in 2004
