= Karel Pauzer =

Czech graphic, sculptor and artist

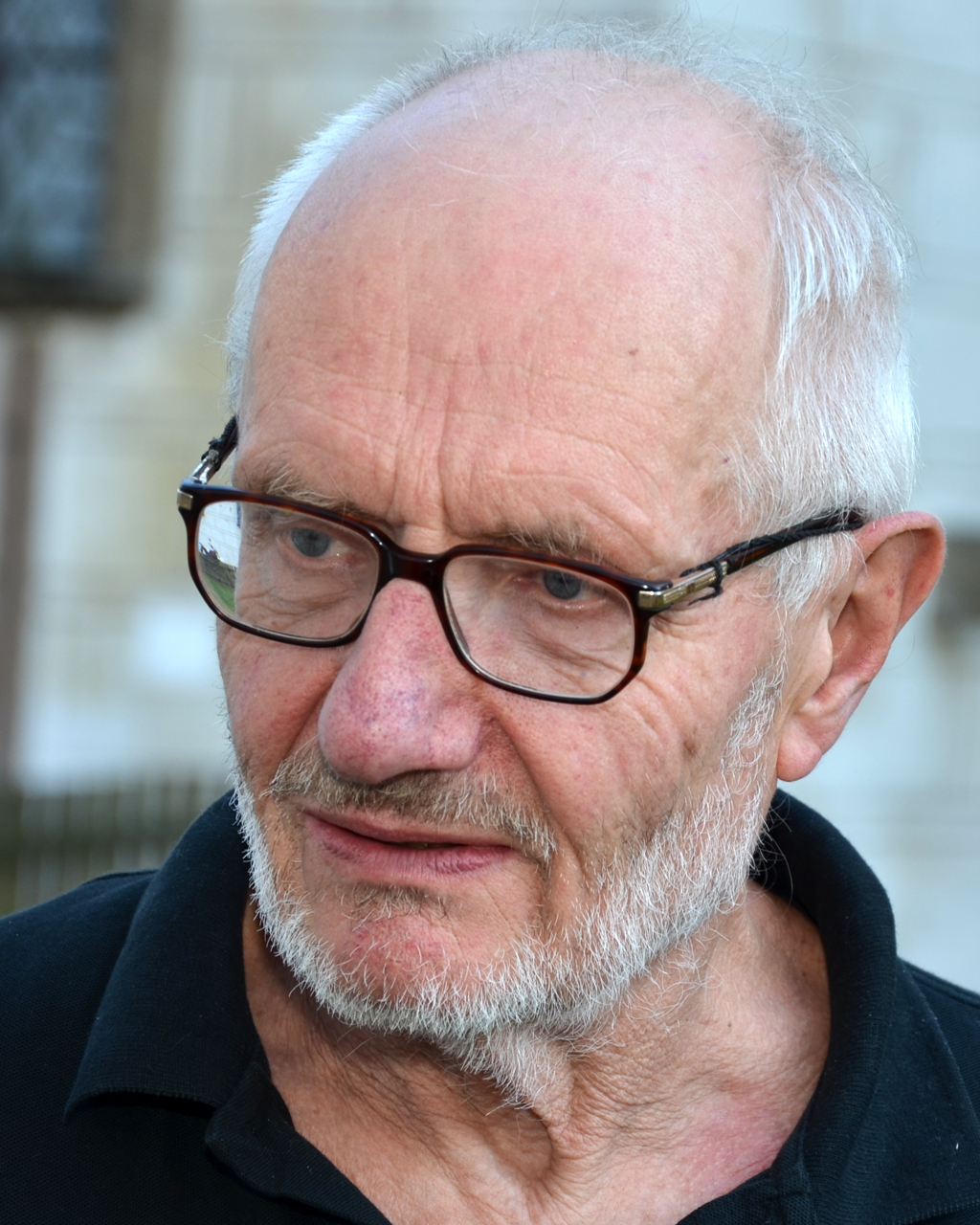
- Karel Pauzer (2015)
- Born: 4 December 1936 (age 89); Prague, Czechoslovakia
- Education: Academy of Arts, Architecture and Design in Prague
- Known for: sculptures, ceramics, painting, prints
- Partner: Hana Purkrábková

Karel Pauzer (born 4 December 1936) is a Czech sculptor, ceramist, painter, printmaker and restorer.

== Life ==
Pauzer was born in Prague in 1936. From his early youth he was interested in nature, and during holidays in the countryside he drew and modelled in clay. In the ceramic workshop of the David family in Štěchovice, he began working with basic techniques at the age of 12, and later built his own ceramic kiln.

Between 1951 and 1955 he studied at the Higher School of Art Industry in Vinohrady and at the Industrial School of Housing Design in Žižkov, Prague. In 1955, he was admitted to the sculpture studio of Profesoor Jan Kavan at the Academy of Arts, Architecture and Design in Prague (VŠUP), majoring in building ceramics, and he met his wife Hana Purkrábková there. He graduated from the school in 1961, and after completing military service from 1961 to 1963 participated in group exhibitions of young artists at home and abroad (Sweden, West Berlin, Amsterdam) from 1966 to 1968. In 1969 he took part in the New Figuration exhibition at the Mánes Gallery in Prague and the House of Arts in Brno, and in the art event Sculpture and the City in Liberec. He presented a solo exhibition at the Václav Špála Gallery in Prague in 1969, featuring a representative set of themes which he then developed in his subsequent work.

After the Warsaw Pact invasion of Czechoslovakia, he was unable to exhibit without registration in the normalization Union of Visual Artists, and worked in isolation as a restorer from 1971 to 1989, salvaging sculptures in the area of the north Bohemian brown coal basin. At the end of the 1980s he participated in a number of unofficial exhibitions (Gallery H, Vojan Park, Forum ’88) and contributed to the anthology Grey Brick, published with the support of the Jazz Section.

In 1987 he became a member of the New Group of Artists (members’ exhibition 1990, Prague), in 1990 the renewed Umělecká beseda arts association, which had its first exhibition in 1992 at the Mánes Gallery, and in 1991 the Lipany association of artists (Galerie Fronta, Prague 1991). He is a member of the Association of Ceramic Artists.

Pauzer lives and works in Brunšov.

== Work ==
=== Sculptures ===
From the beginning of his work, Karel Pauzer has preferred modelling in ceramic clay, leaving the sculptures in the natural colour of the material or enhancing them with polychromy. For larger sculptures he later used the lightness and strength of synthetic resins (often in conjunction with ceramic materials), less often working with cement and metal.

According to Jiří Šetlík, Pauzer came to the school with a preconceived, not very optimistic view of the world and people. His work stems from an inner restlessness and the artist becomes a kind of modern mystic of natural events. Among the artists of his generation, he appears as a solitaire who does not succumb to the pressures or artistic currents of the time. He belongs to the artists who are so familiar with nature that they can compete with it.

His early sculptural work includes a series of relief sculptures responding to contemporary tendencies of structural abstraction and existential skepticism. In a kind of mystical idealism, he also reimagined and reinterpreted the aesthetics of Czech Informel in his own way. In the mid-1960s he returned to figuration, exhibiting his first expressive parables inspired by the fierce struggle for existence, aggression and gluttony. In the second half of the 1960s, in addition to animal and plant sculptures, he created polychrome sculptures composed of multiple complementary elements, which more or less freely quote some natural structures (egg, berry, shell, etc.). He thus drew on the constructivist tendencies of the time and the distinctive, almost grotesque colouring of the individual elements also reflects a certain change in the life experience during a short period of relative freedom.

=== 1960s ===
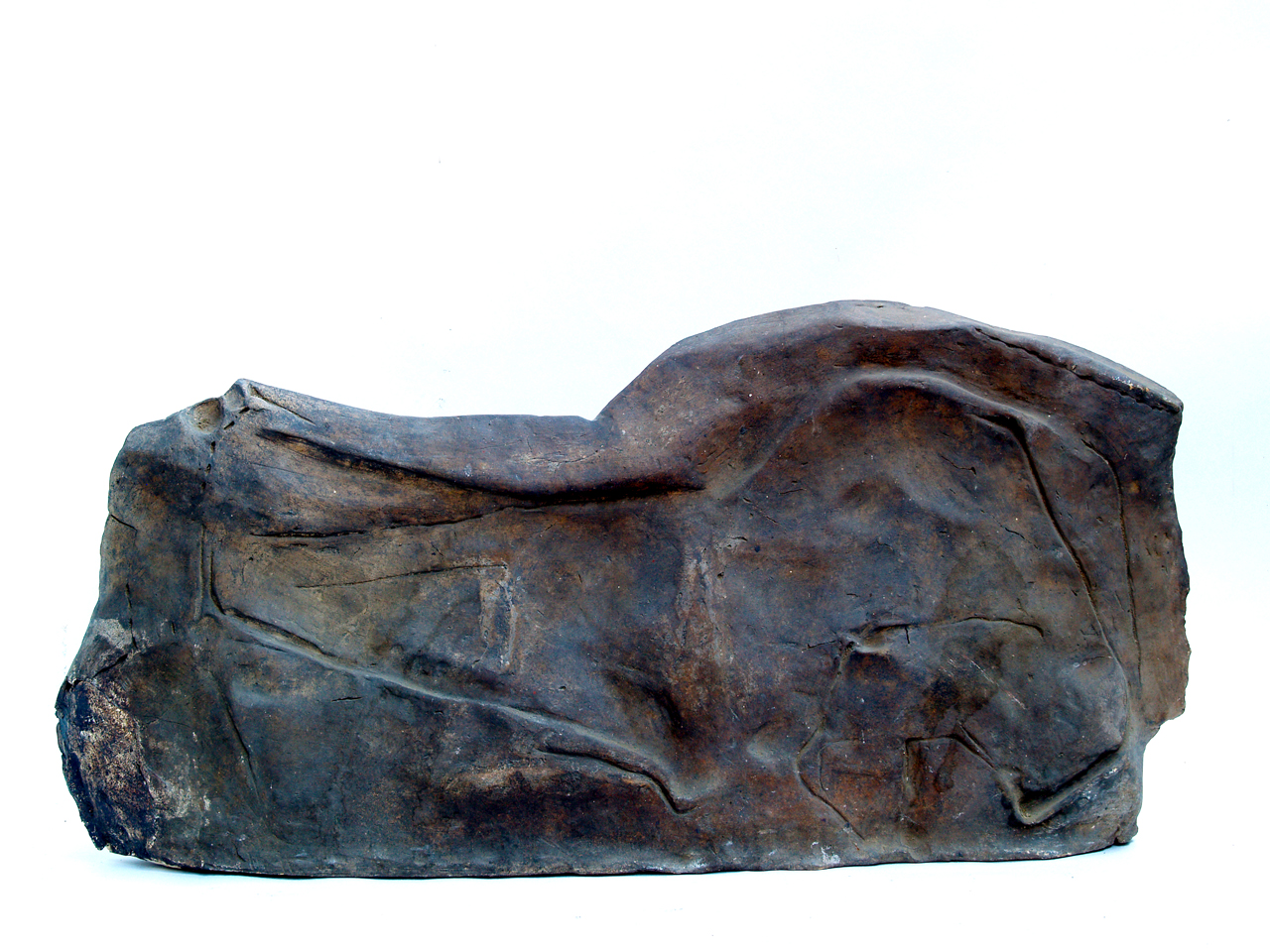
Ridge of the Back, 1964

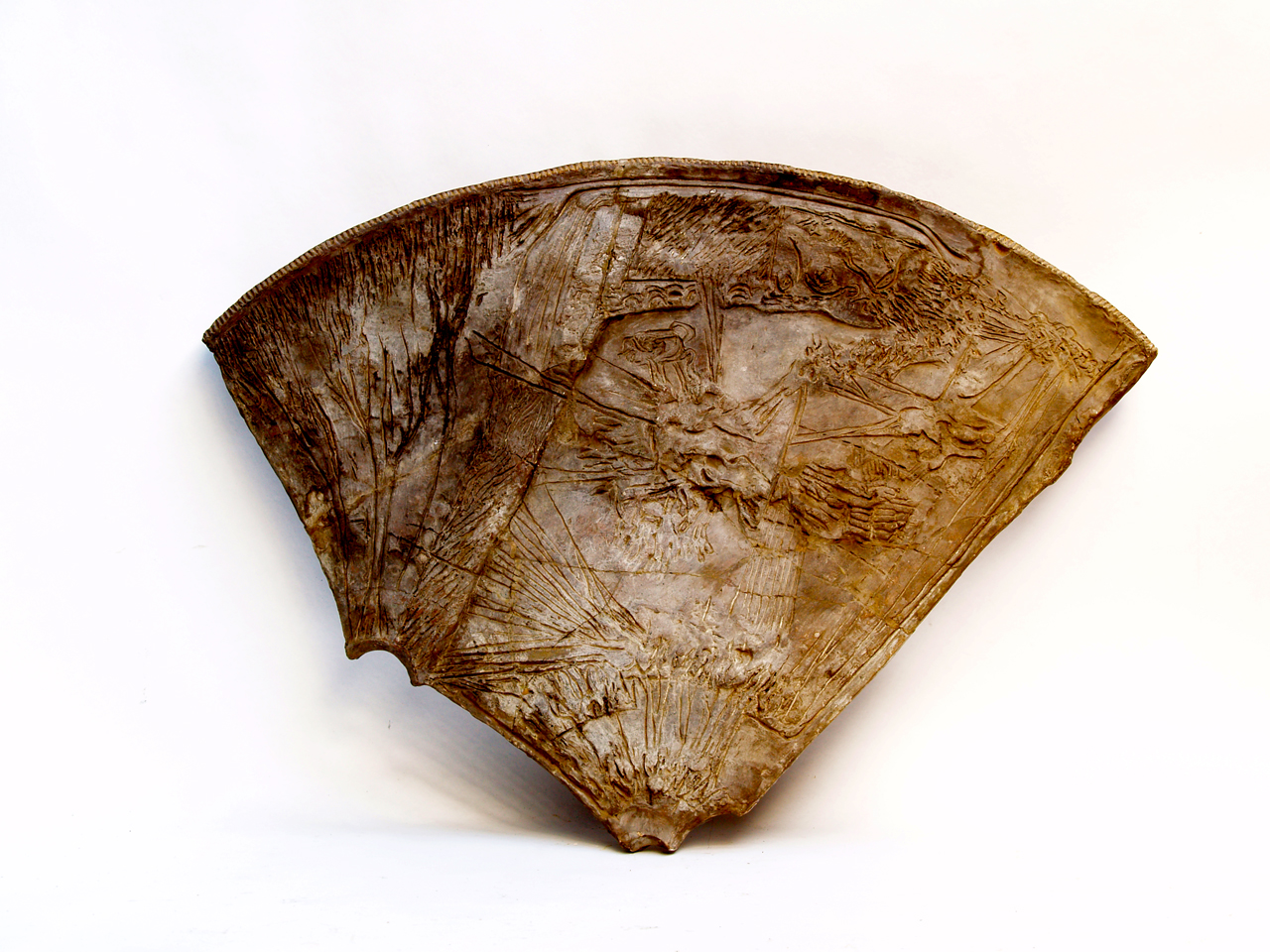
Segment, 1965

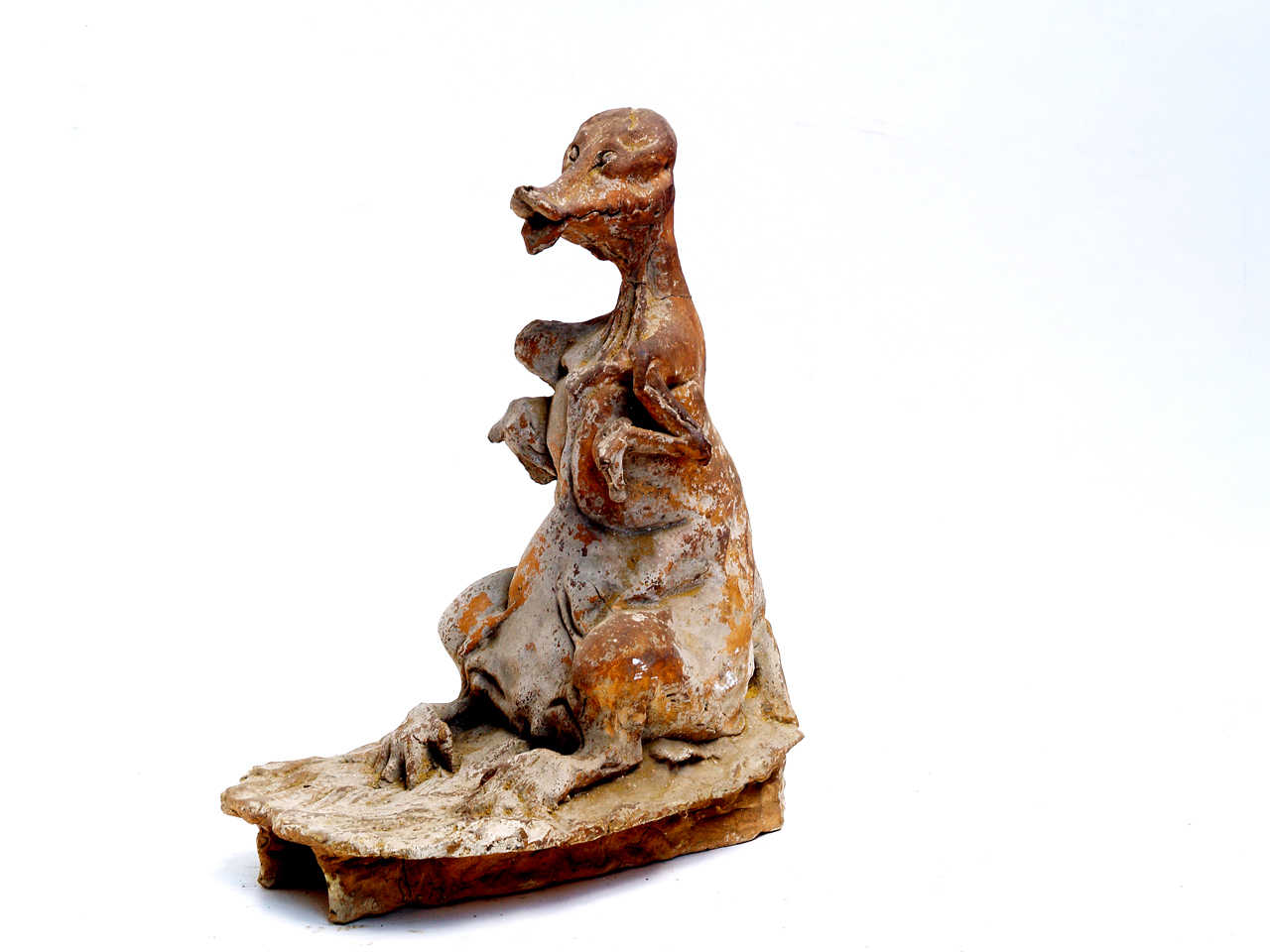
Little Whistler, 1967

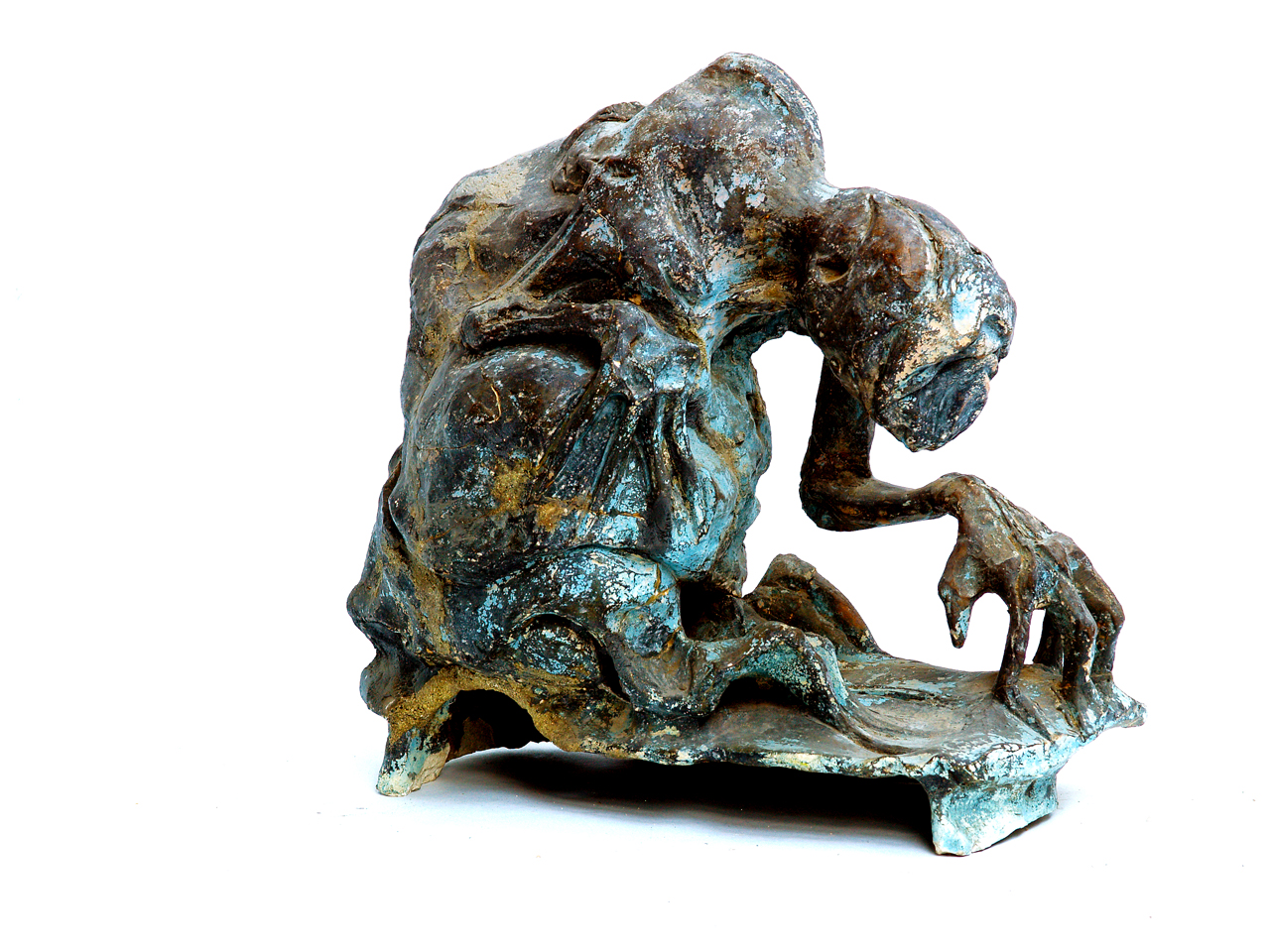
Burrowing Animal, 1967

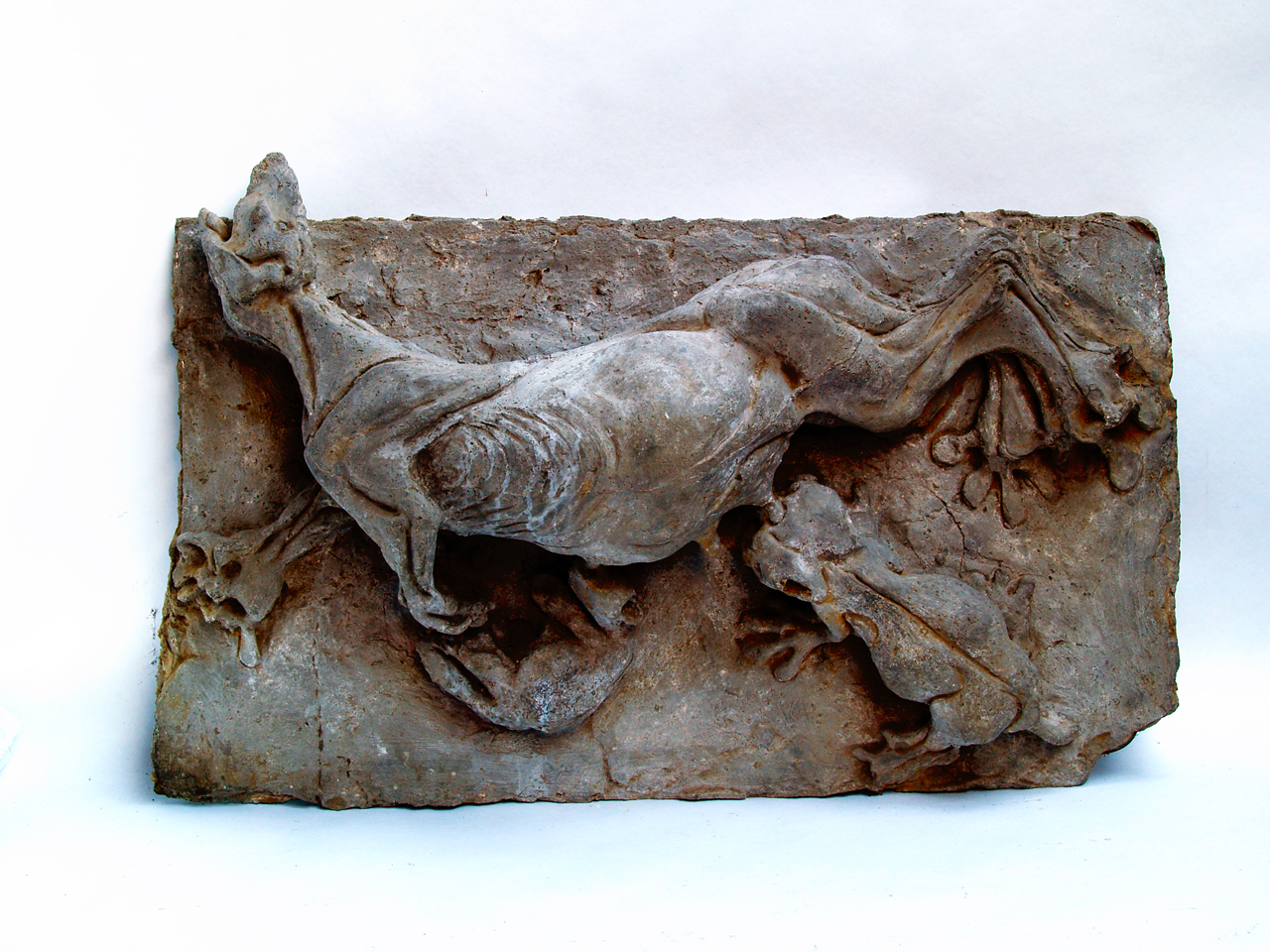
Family, 1968

The occupation of Czechoslovakia in 1968 returned Karel Pauzer's work to the raw realism and brutal conception of his fantasy bestiary. In his metaphorical depictions of animals, the sculptor often uses drastically expressive scenes of seemingly animal, but in reality human situations. The nudity of his animal figures, the taut muscles, exposed nipples and genitalia, the facial expressions, the positions depicted and the distorted proportions are intended to disturb, unnerve and lead to deeper reflection. With his realistic modelling, Pauzer gives the impression of a sensually concrete form of a living organism. He does not seek superficial descriptions of banal situations, and although his depictions of animals may resemble gothic gargoyles, mannerist animal monsters or are classified for their external similarity with the so-called "czech grotesque", they are always a purely private reflection of the world, turned more inward than outward. His sculptural works are directed towards the human soul, its terrors and pent-up instincts, eternal restlessness, feelings of threat and alienation.

Pauzer's sculptures have made him one of the most important authors of the animal genre in world sculpture. He continues the tradition of Baroque expressionism, which he revalues in a new way.

=== Figures (turn of the 1960s - 2014) ===
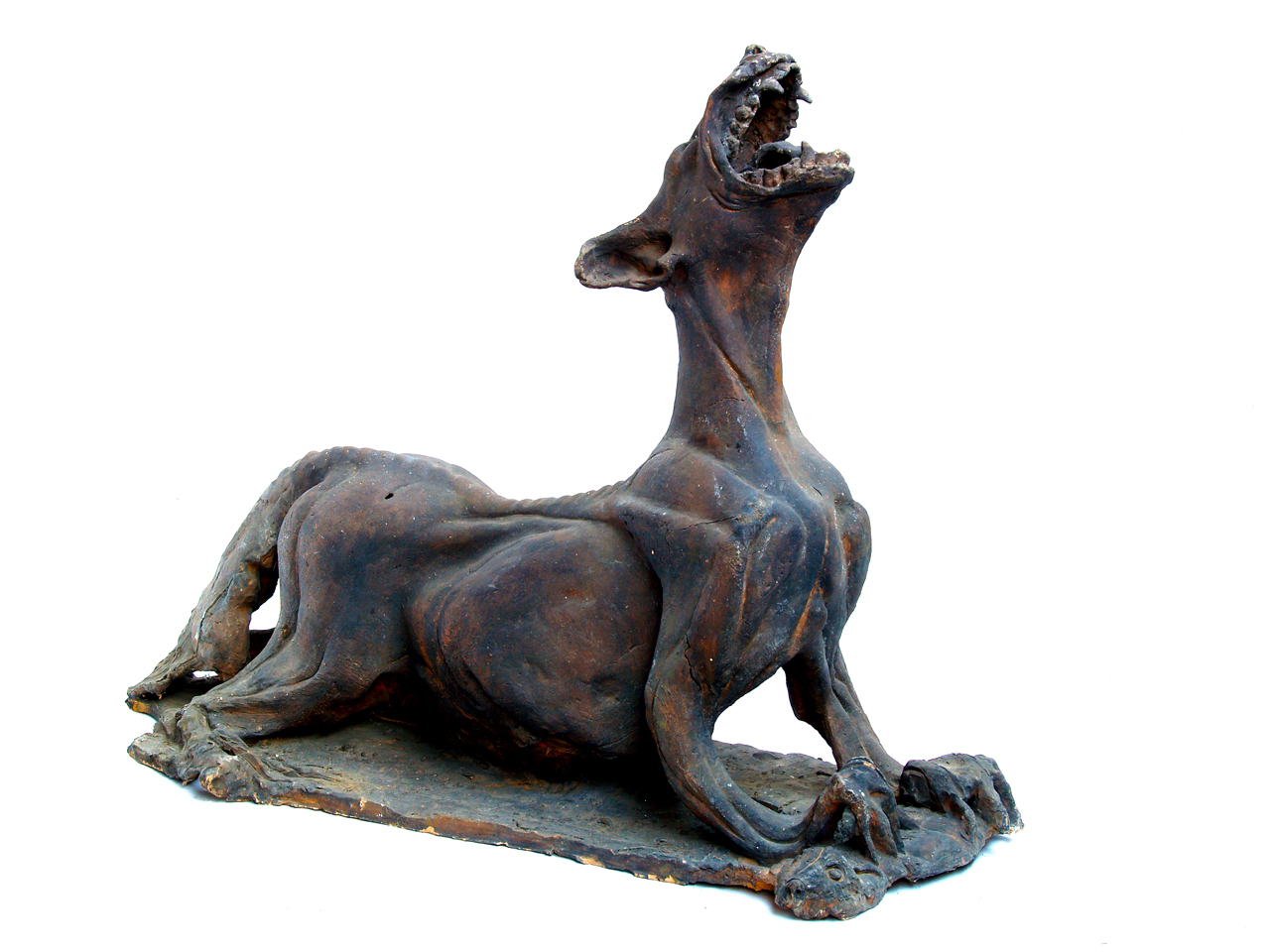
Black dog, 1968-1969

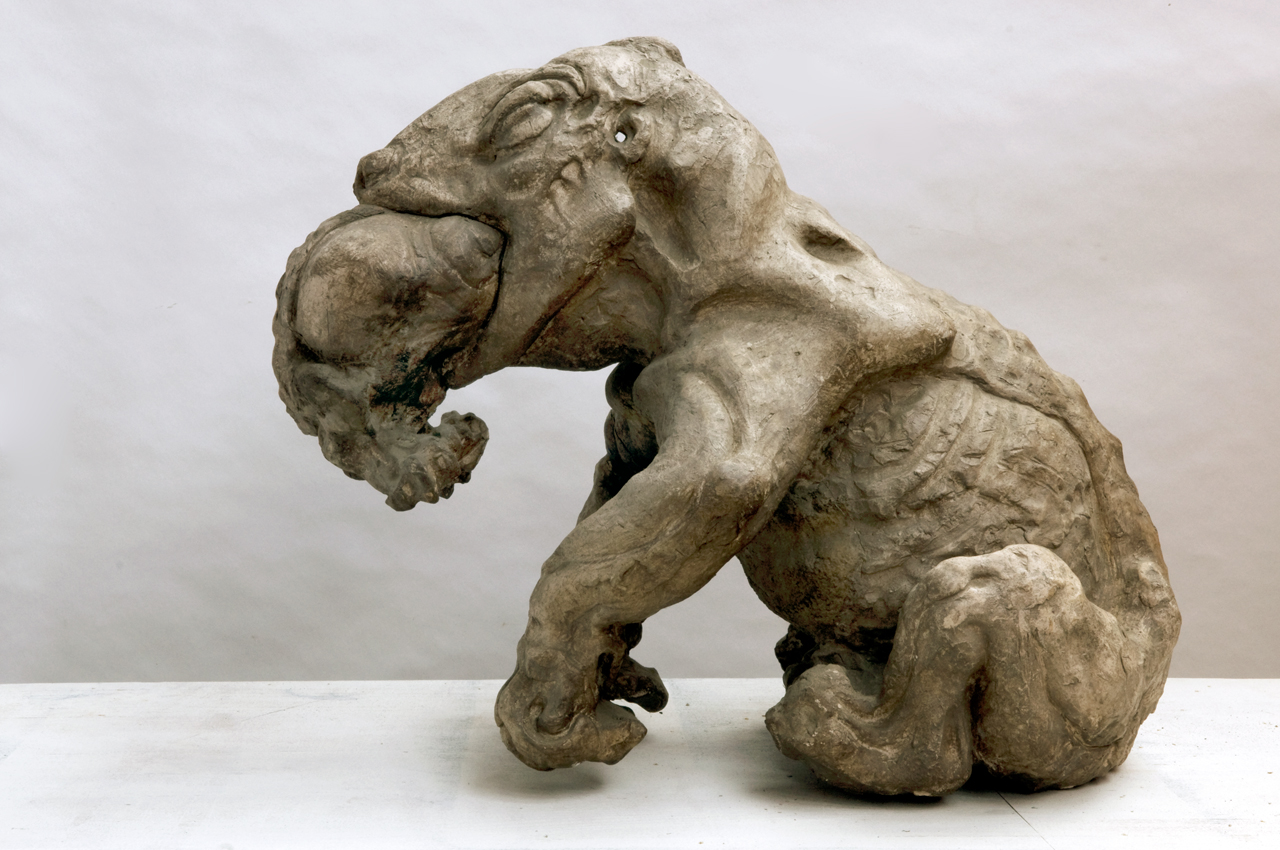
Eater, 1978

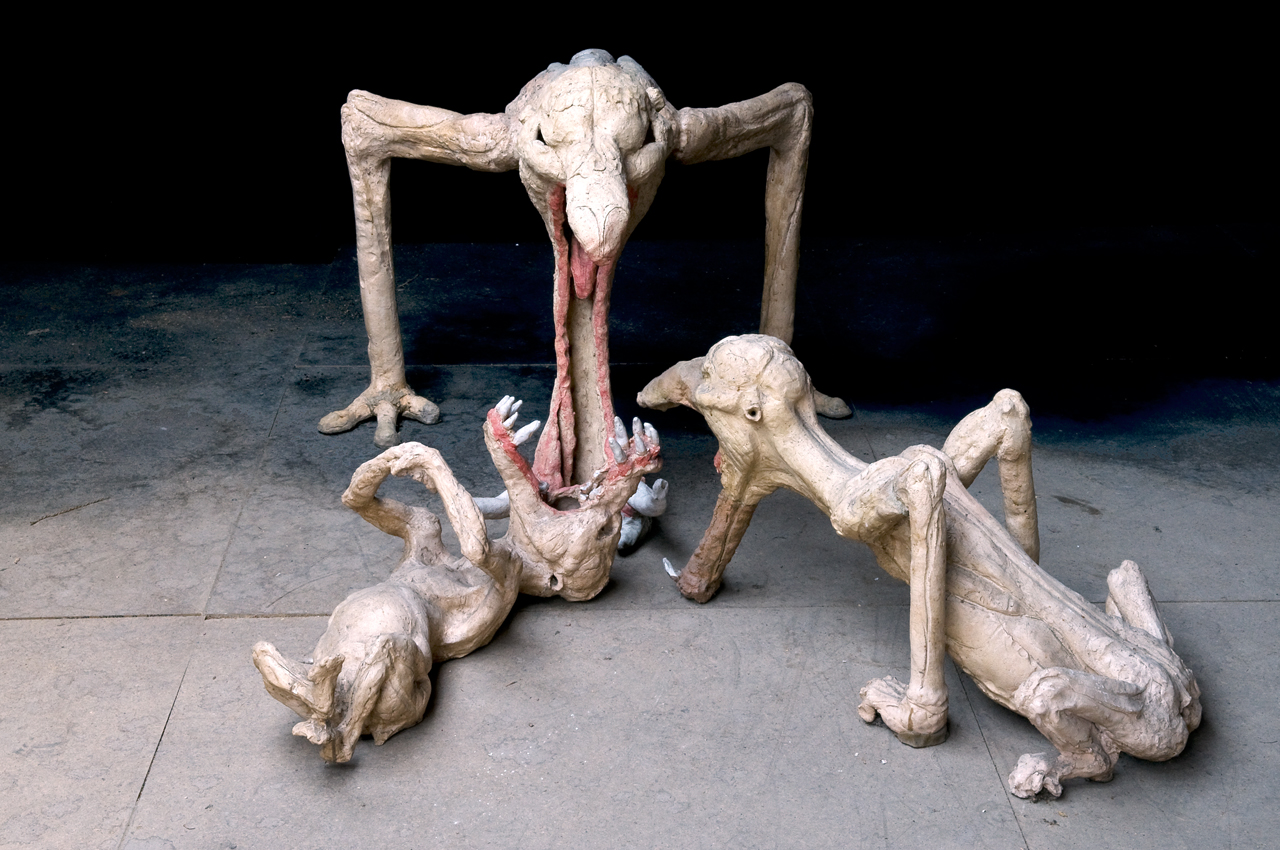
Two on one 2, 1992

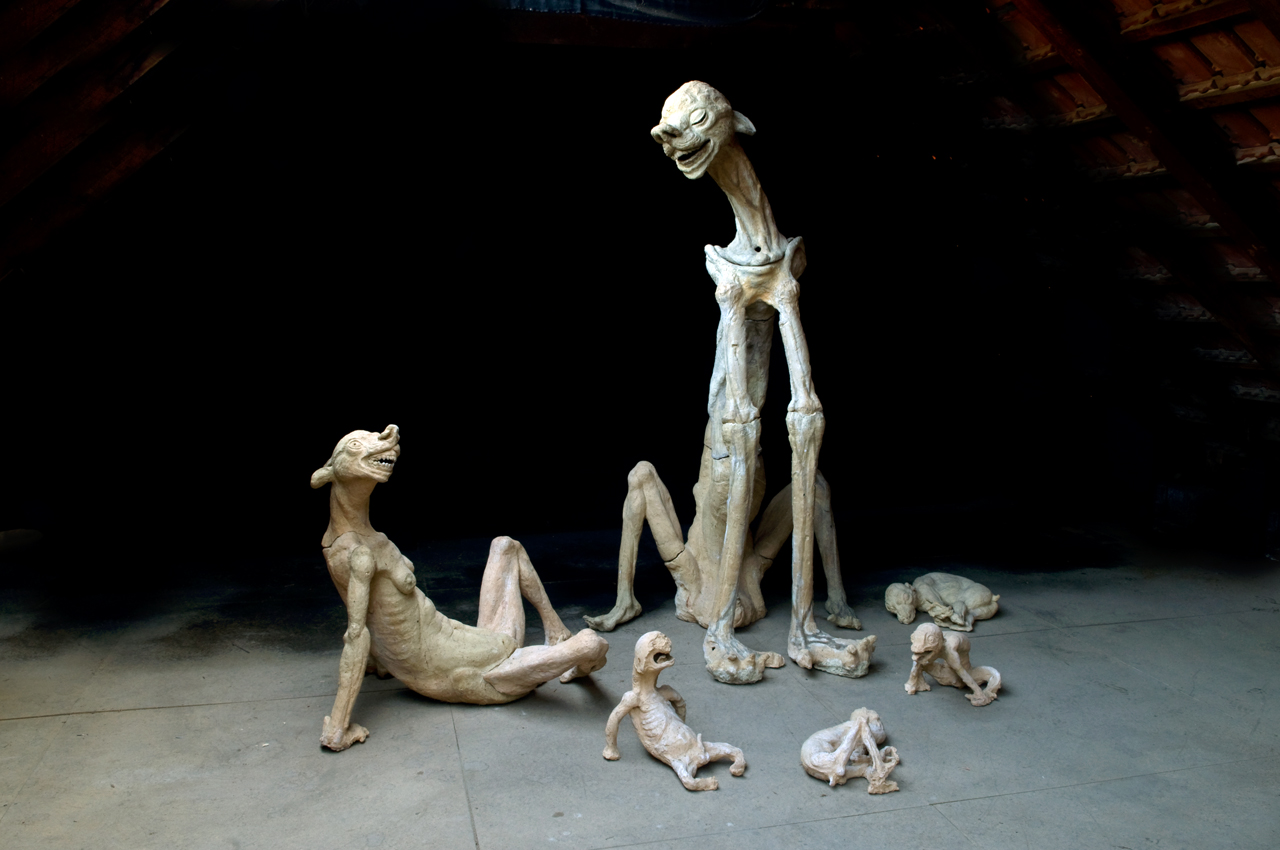
Family 2000, 1999-2000

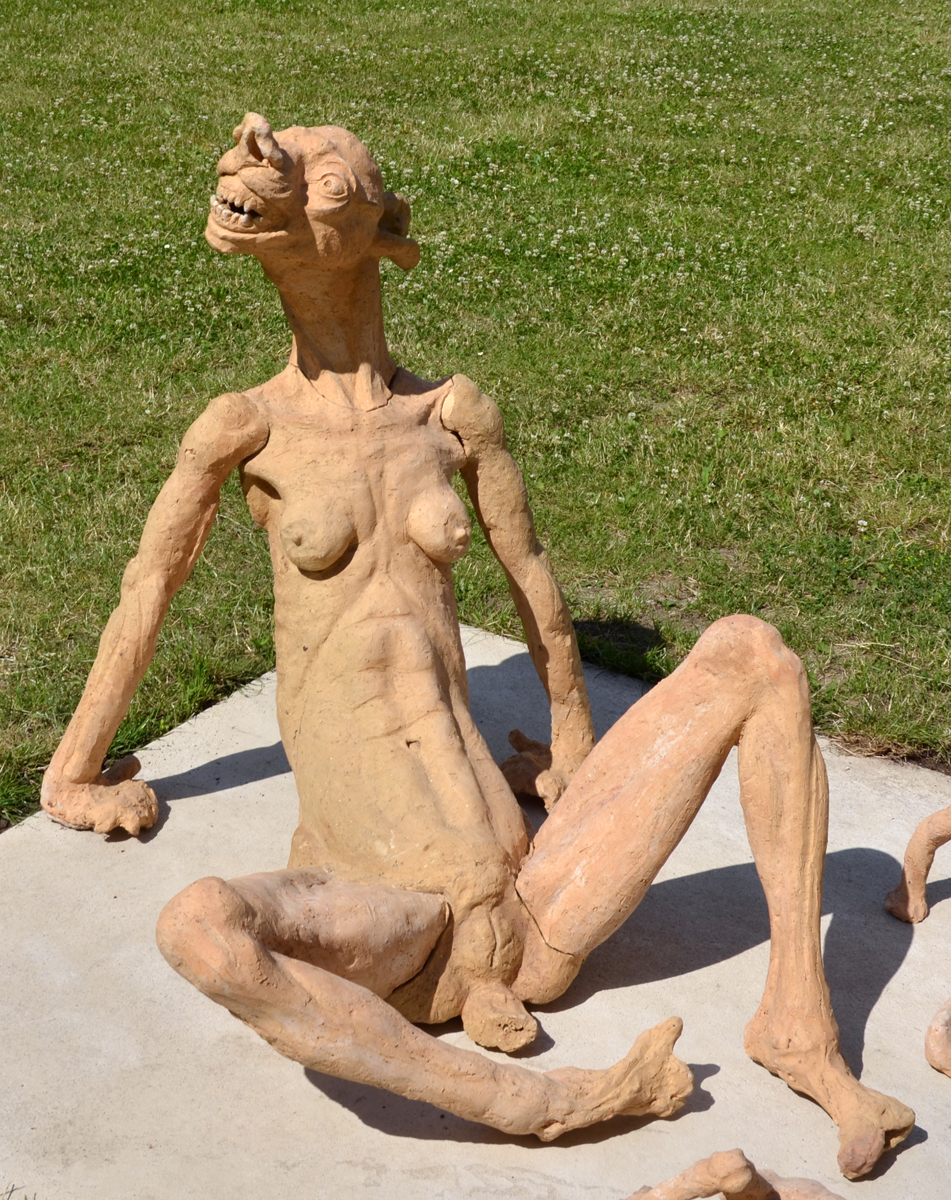
Family, detail, 2000

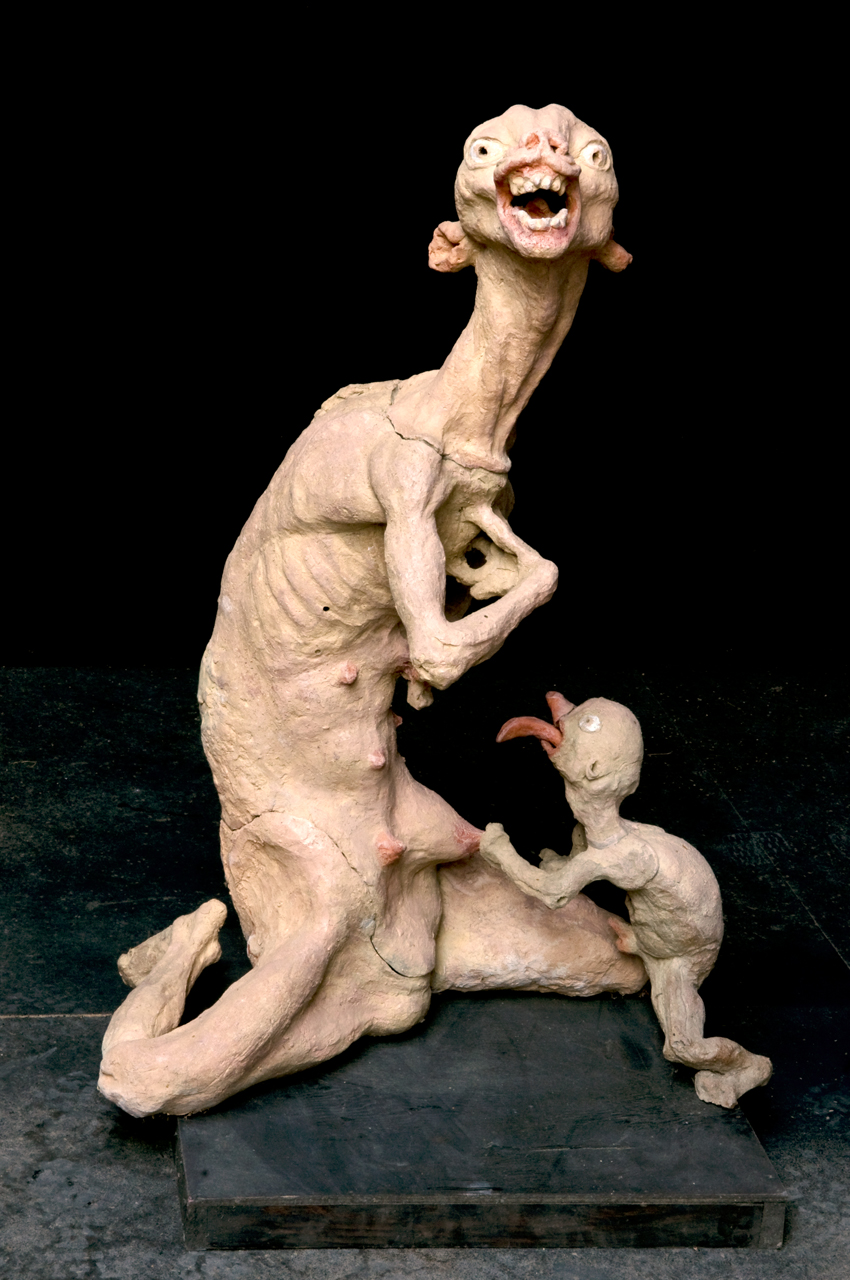
Mum + Boy, 2006

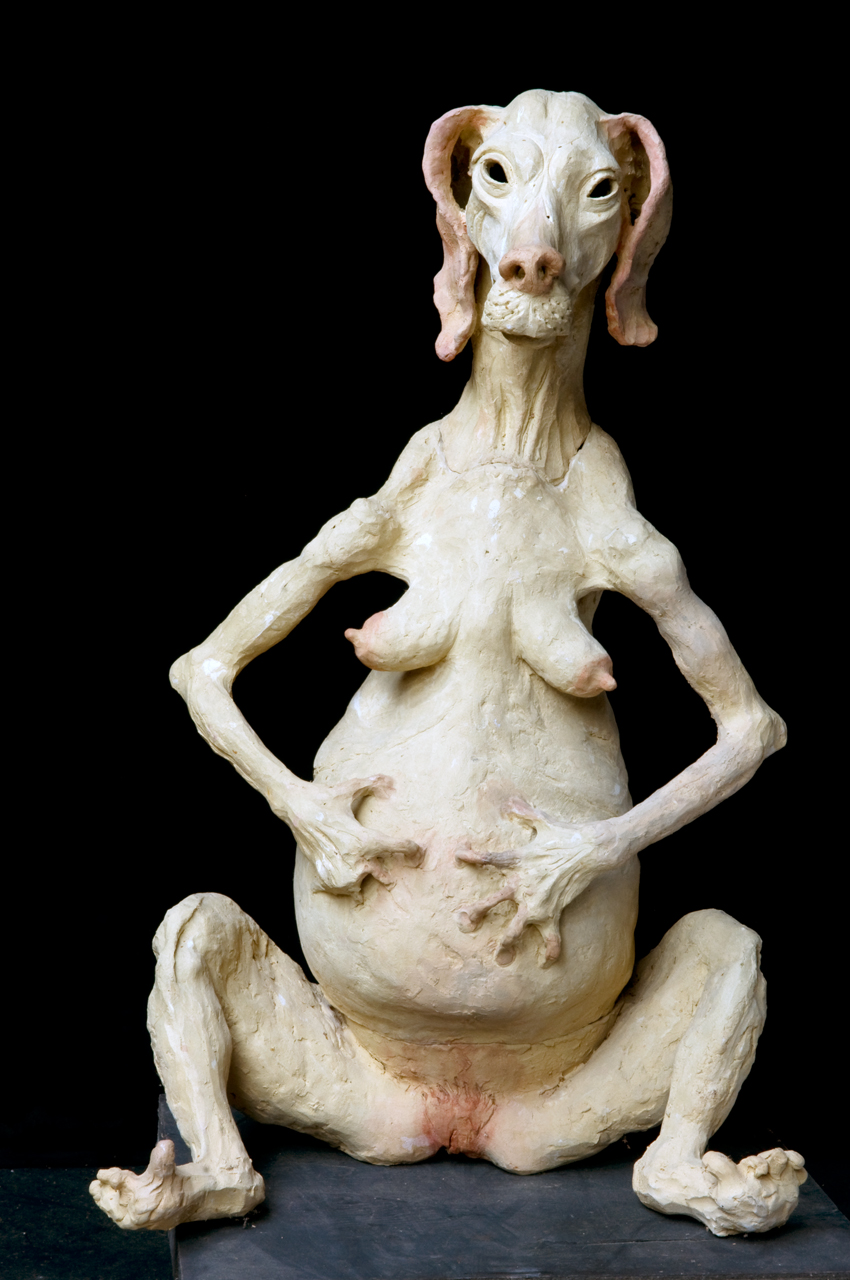
Doll, 2008

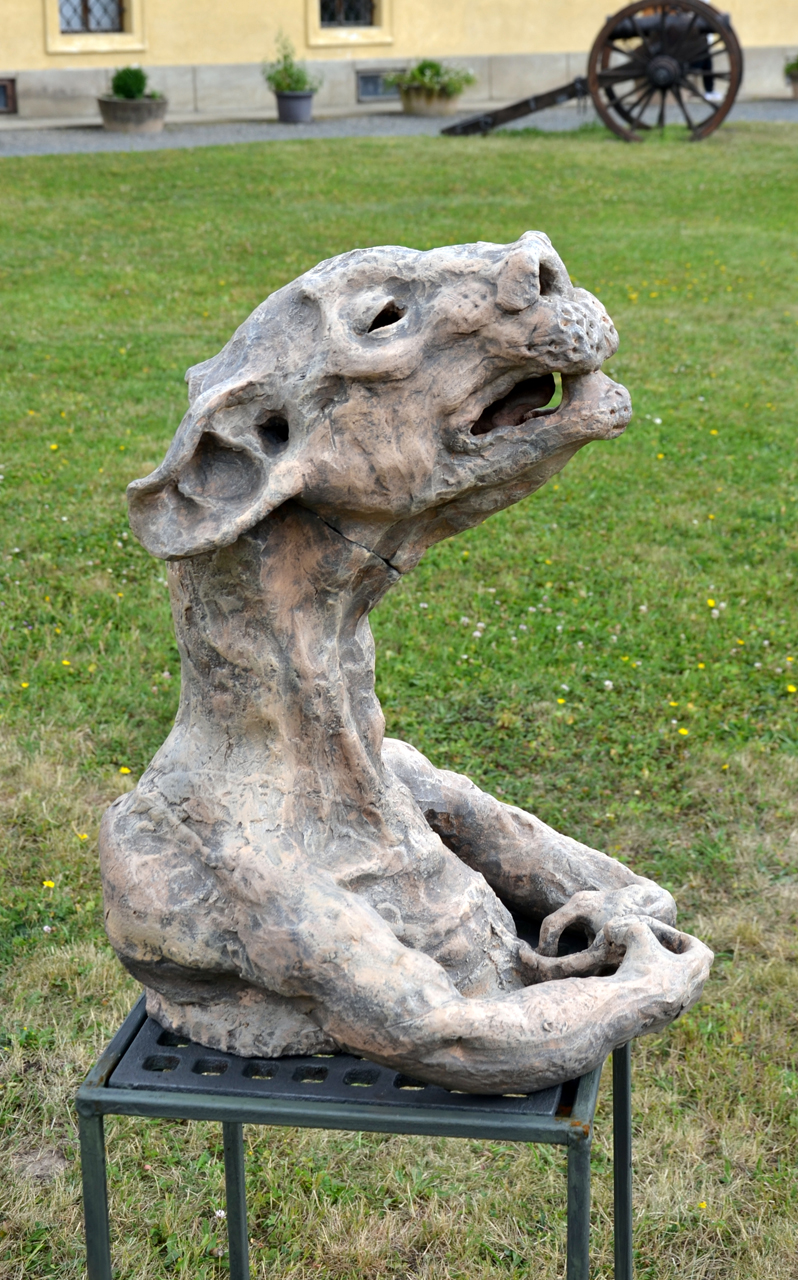
Untitled, 2014

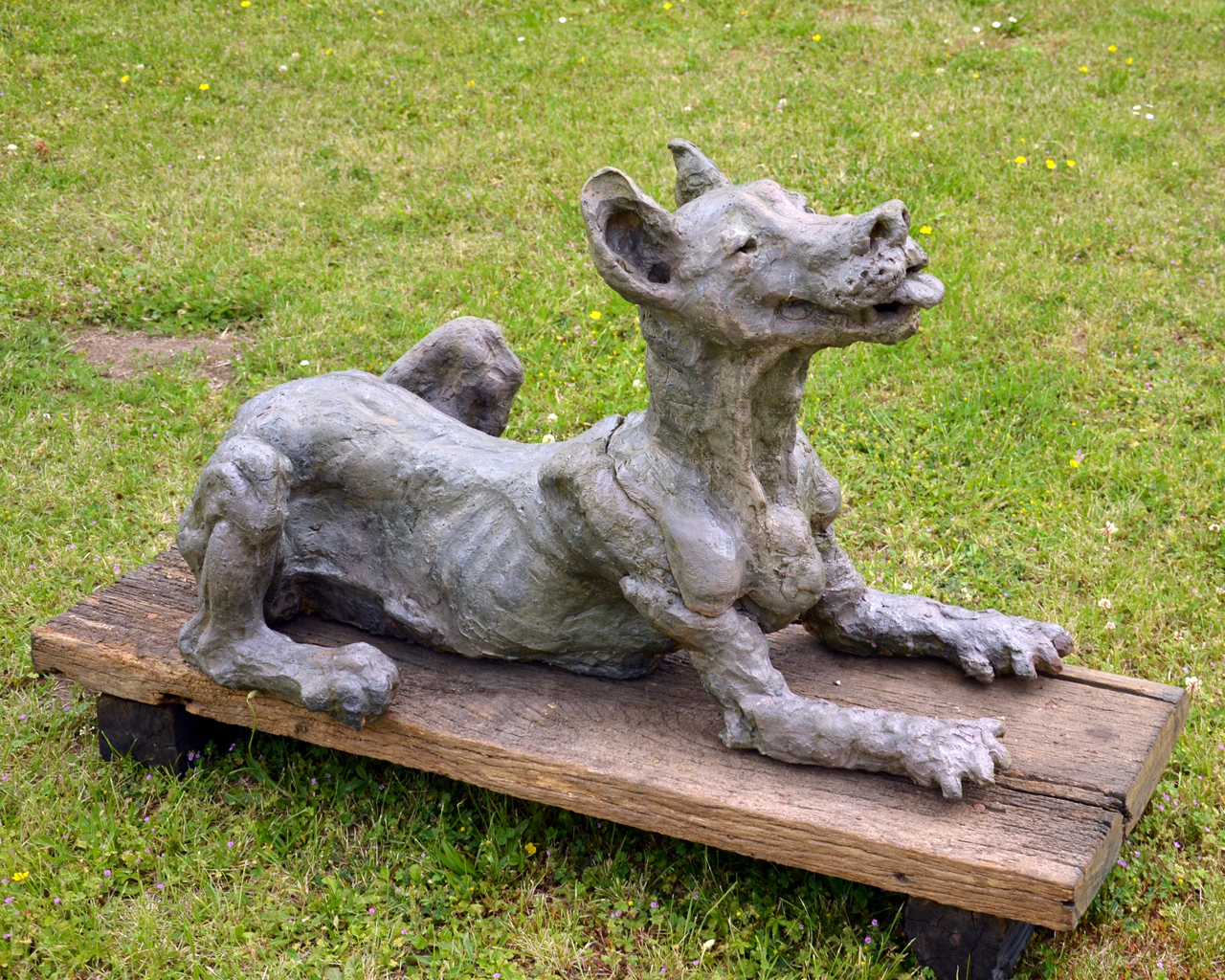
Dog, 2014

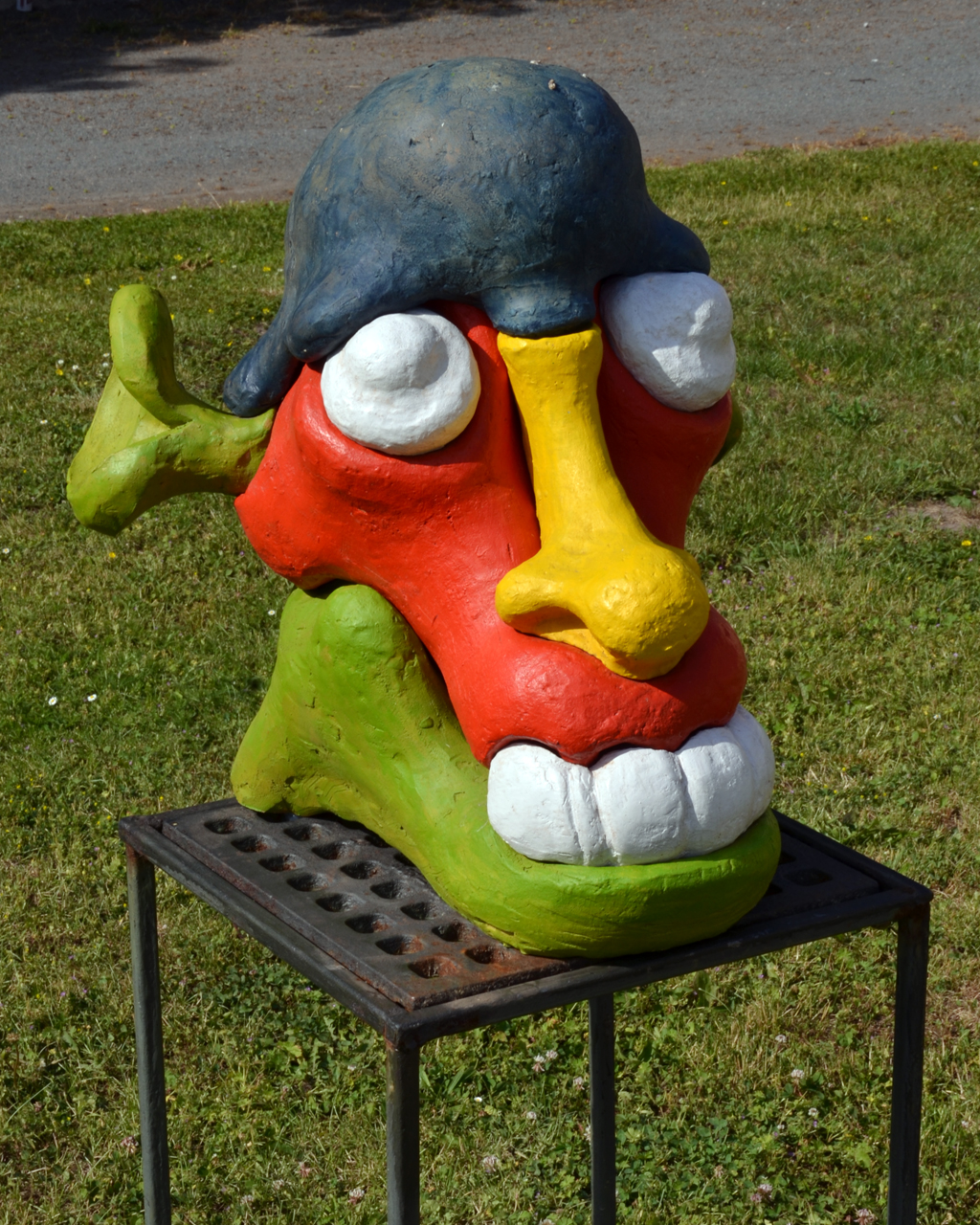
Coloured Head, 2014

Also in his large-scale biomorphic sculptures from the post-1989 period, the sculptor freely uses only structures, constructions or mechanics derived from nature, but by assembling the individual elements with distinctive colours, he emphasises that the construction of the sculptures is purely his own human intention. With the ease of a creator and in exaggeration, he composes surrealistic giant clawed feet, attaches insect wings to stems, provides the targets of liverworts with manes, freely combines joints, antennae, claws, carnivorous leaves, tongues, eyes. The names of these artificial resin formations reflect a subtly tinted lyricism (Big broadleave, Sixfingered, Snakefly, Little Mouths).

=== Zoobotanical sculptures ===
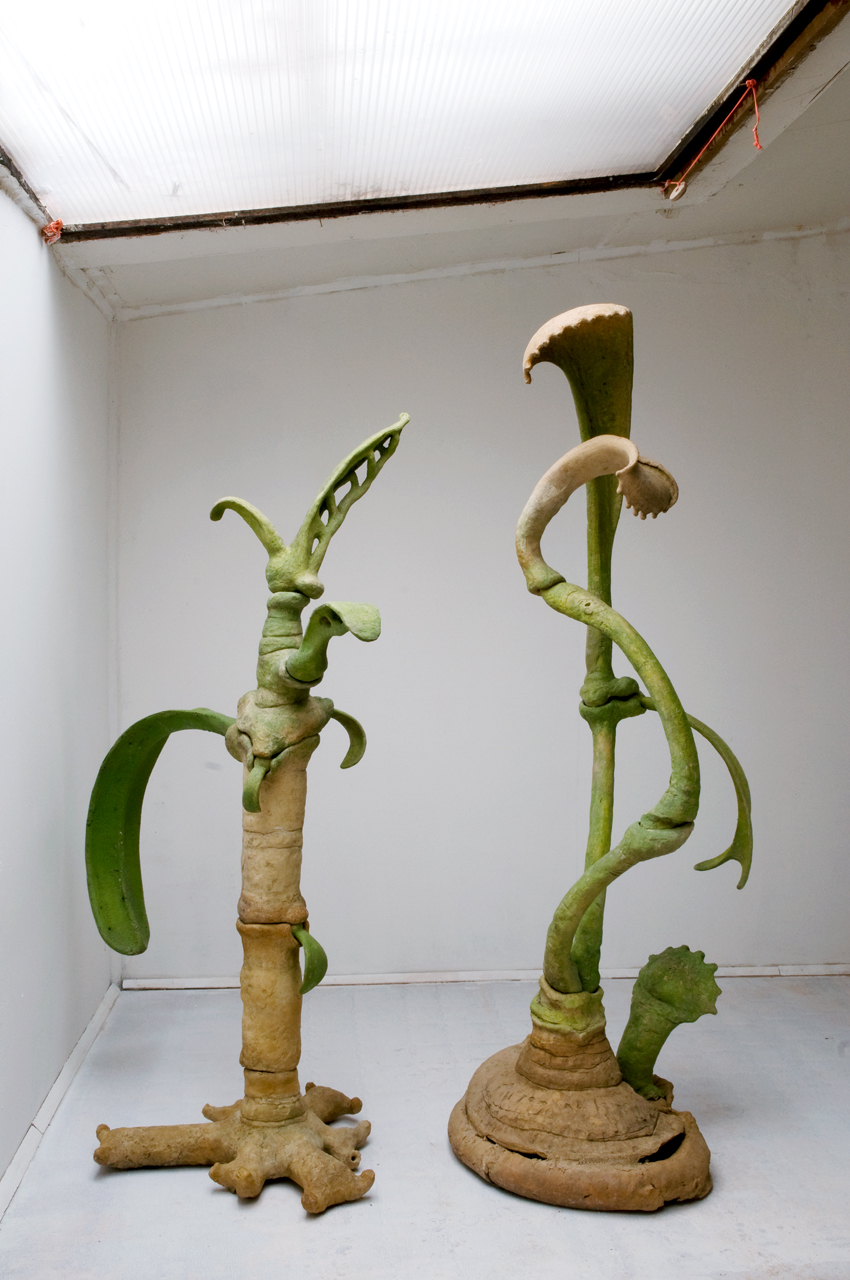
Botanical Zoological I, 1996-1997

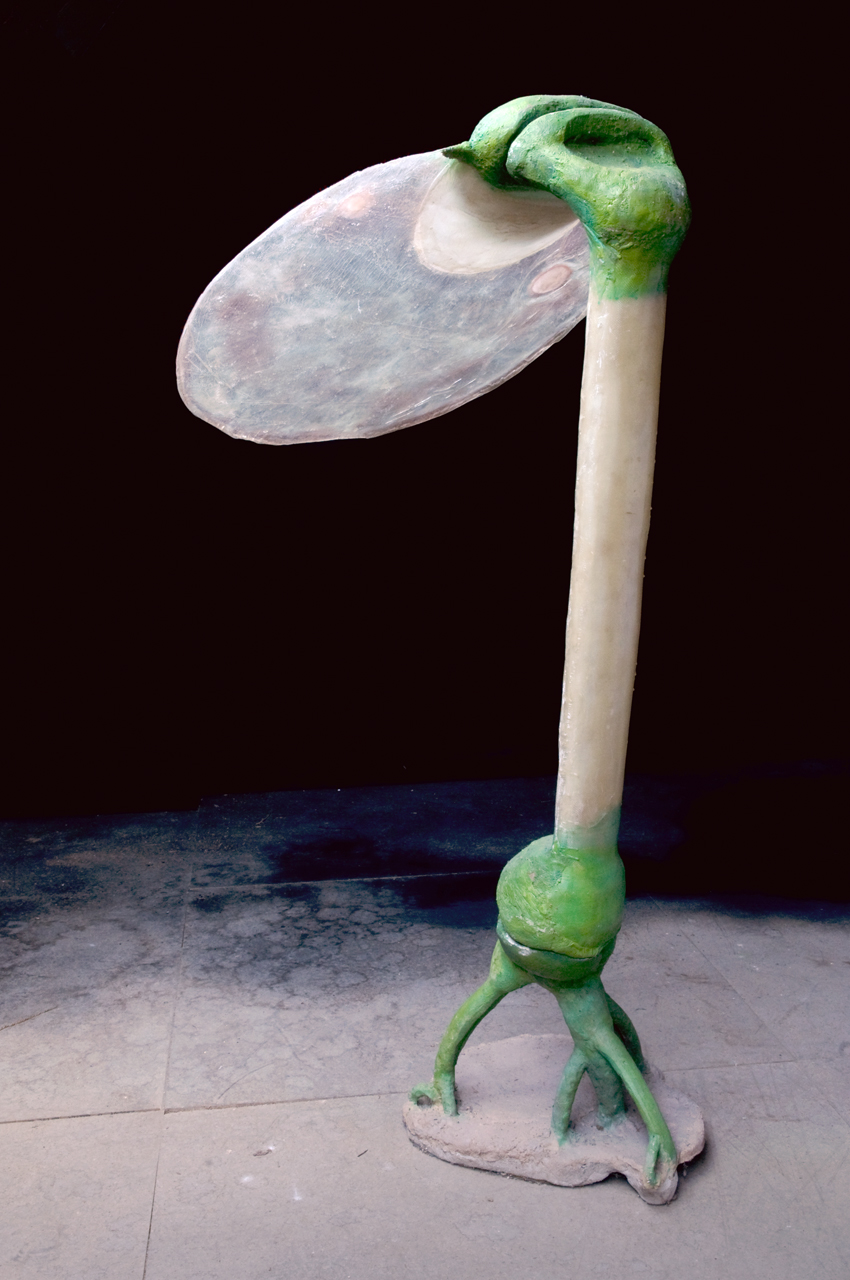
Leaf Creature, 2003

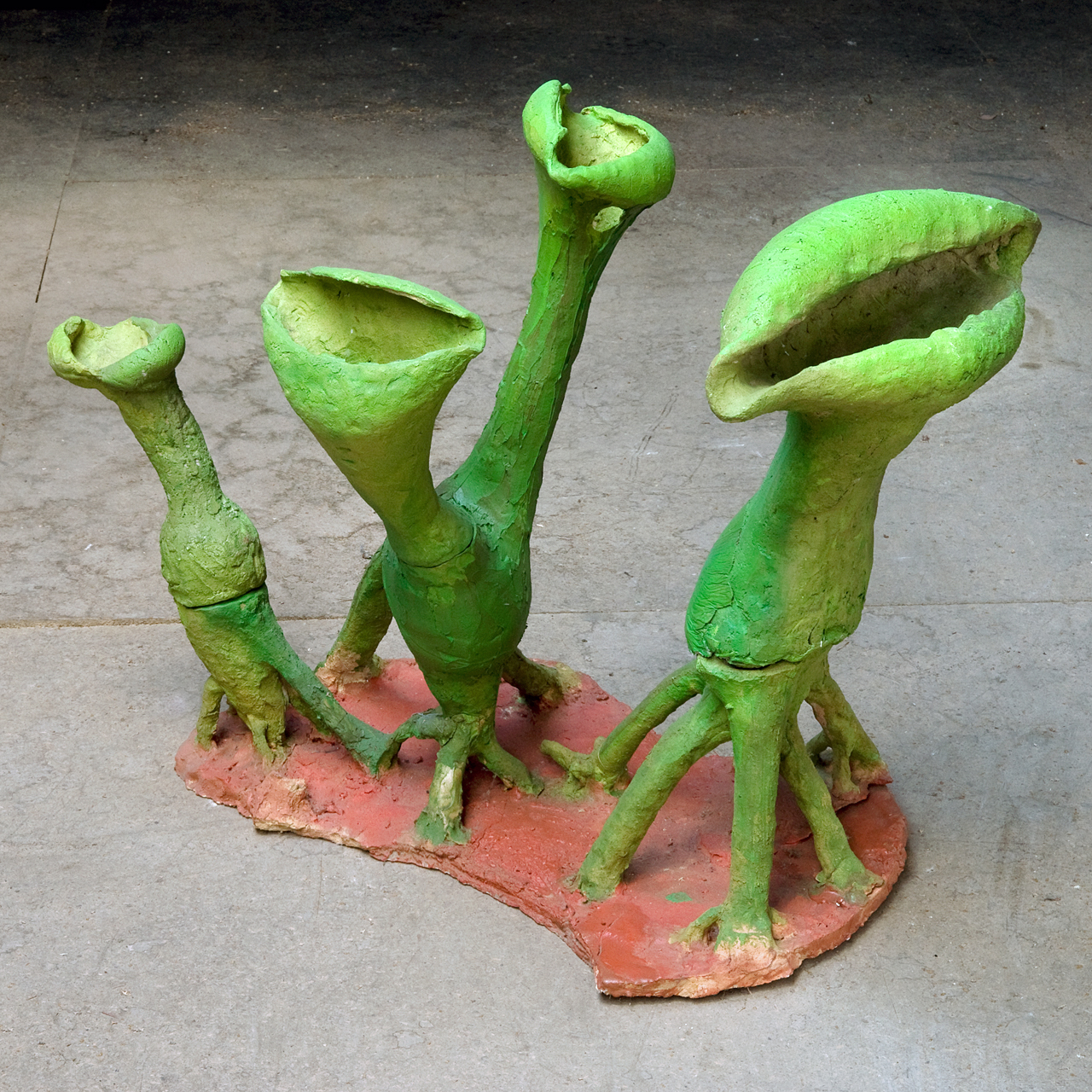
Little Mouths, 2008

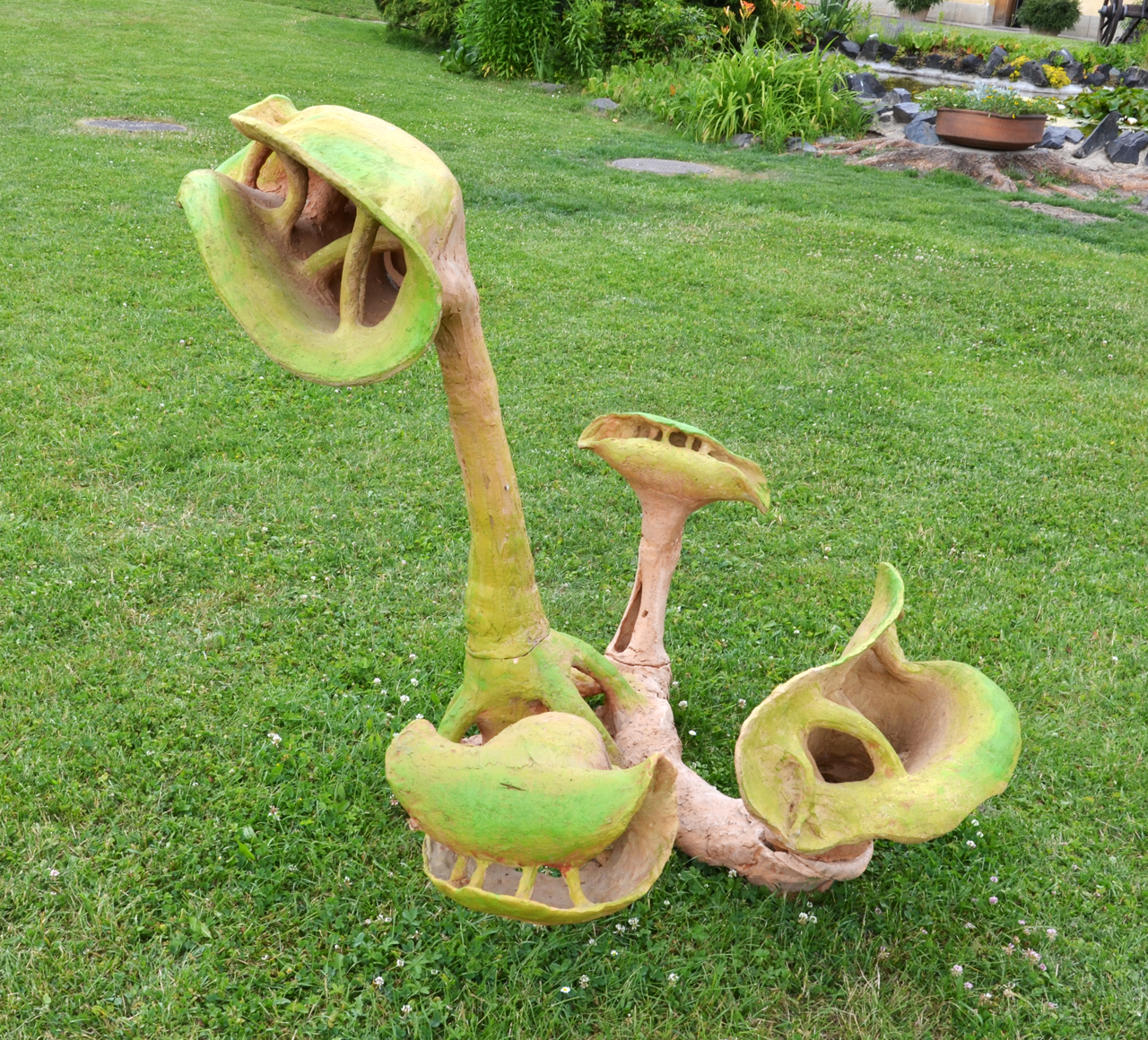
Bigger Mouths, 2009

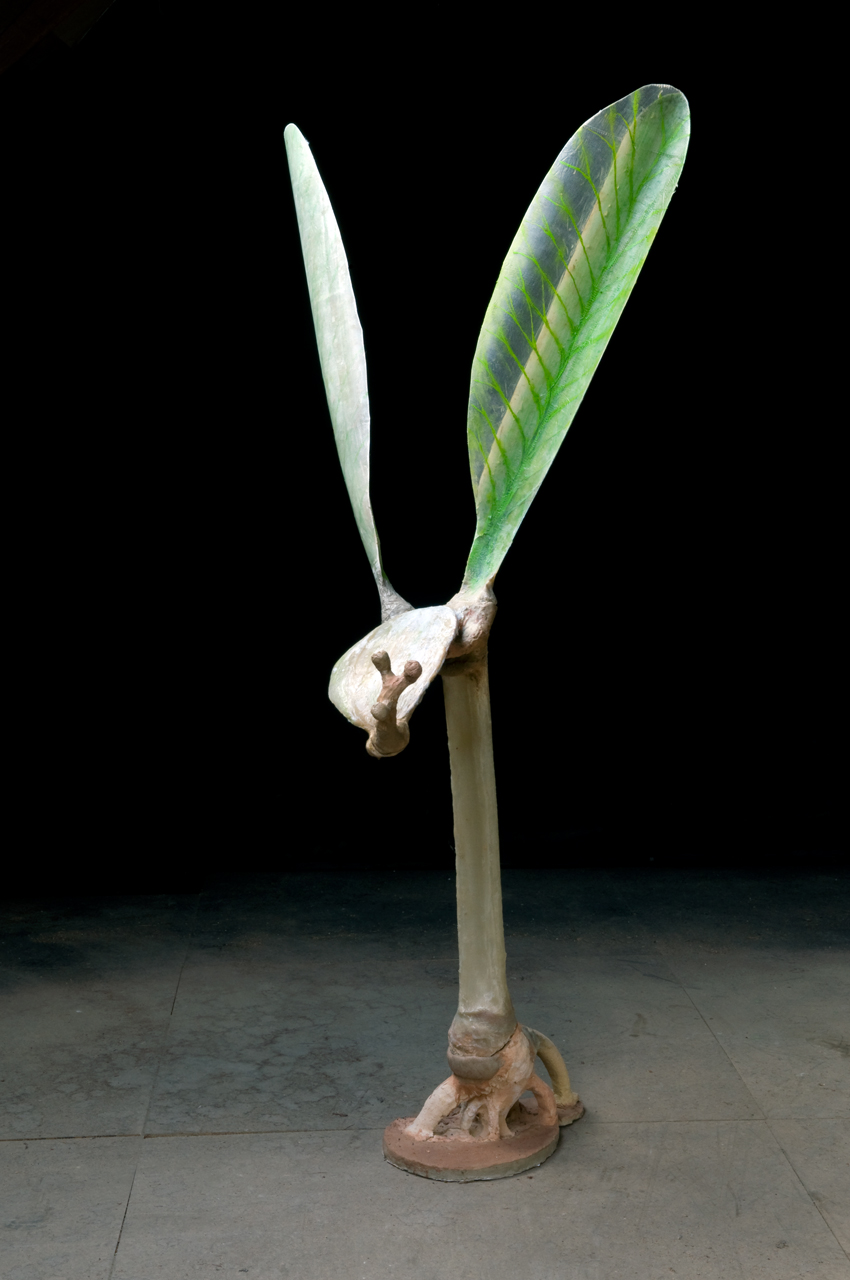
Double Leaf, 2009-2010

=== Prints and drawings ===
From the 1970s onwards, his graphic sheets, usually a combination of etching and aquatint, develop the same theme. They are characterised by an emphasis on volume, but also by a looser representation of figures and an expressiveness that modelling in clay does not allow. The depicted stories reflect the normalization era with all its treachery, betrayal, violence and cynicism. They are fundamental works of Czech grotesque and their committed content ranks among the best of Czech graphic art of the time. Pauzer's graphic cycle of animal allegories can be considered one of the culminating expressions of intellectual resistance to aggression and the newly established totalitarianism of the decadent power in Czech art. Pauzer's graphic art is parallel to his sculpture and has been presented in solo exhibitions.

Large-scale drawings combined with watercolour tend towards abstraction, but original natural elements can be traced in them, reminiscent of embryonic tissues, cell cultures, emerging life and its demise.

==== Drawings and paintings ====
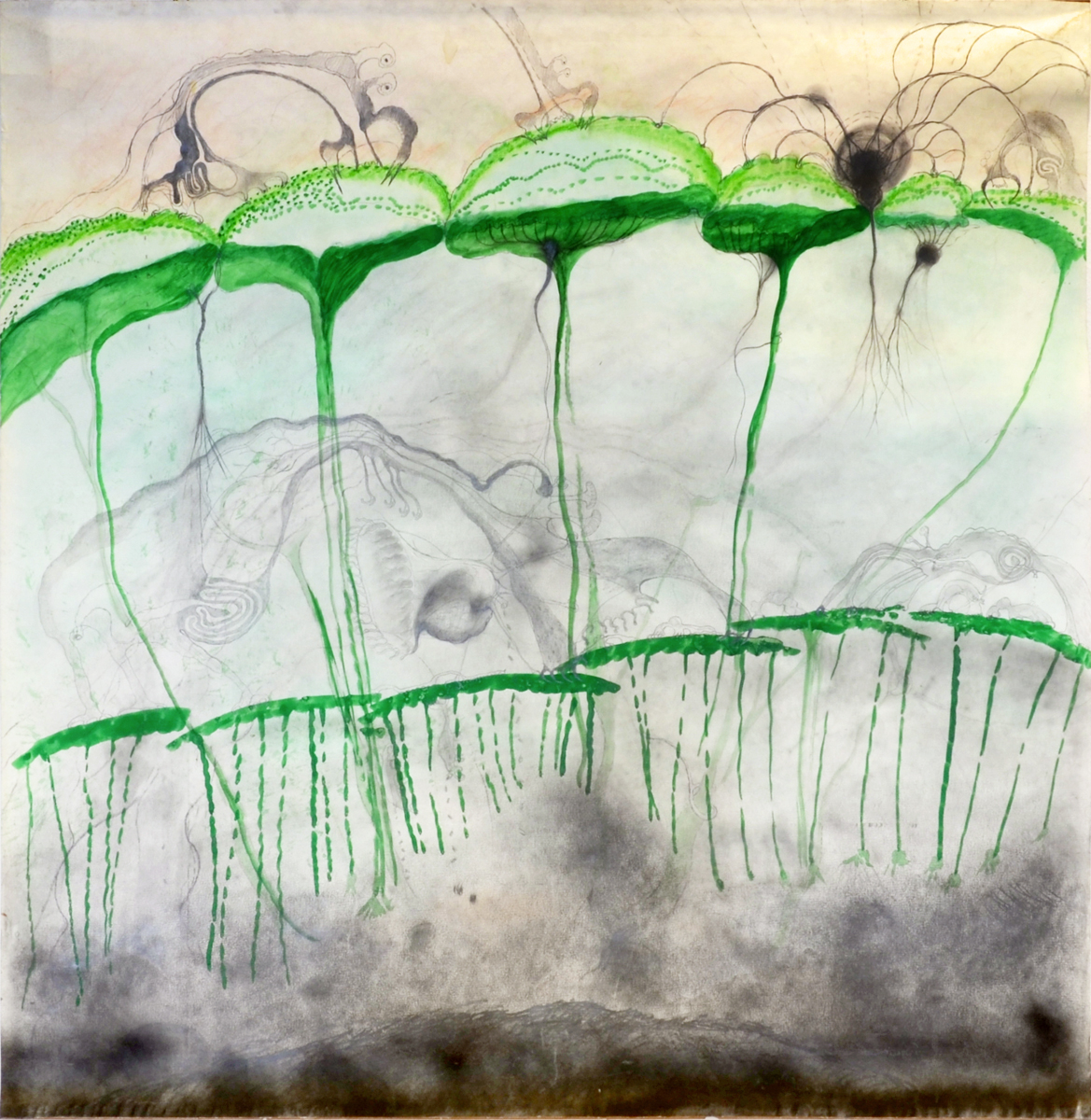
Something Alive, 1994

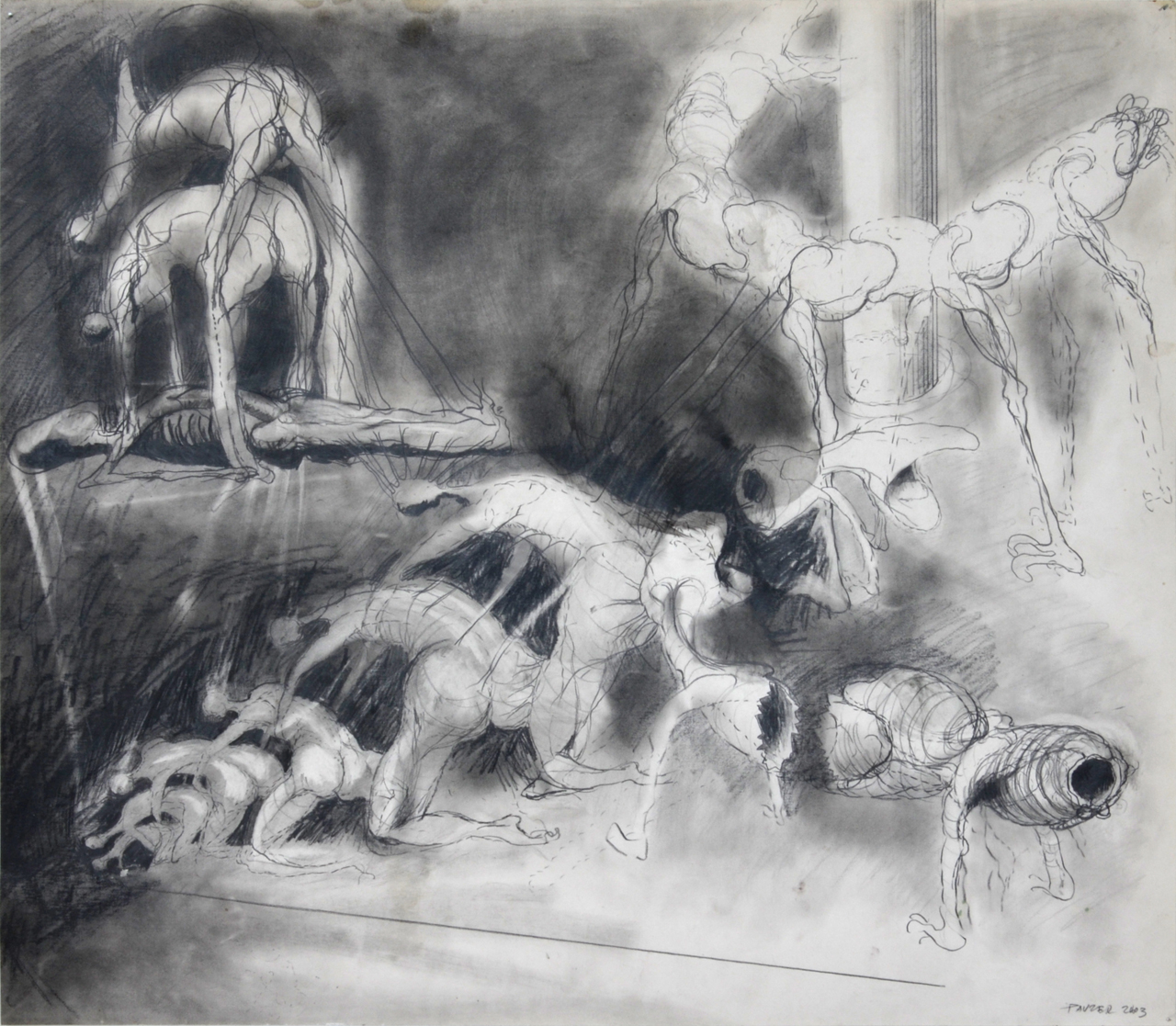
Round and Round, graphite, paper, 2003

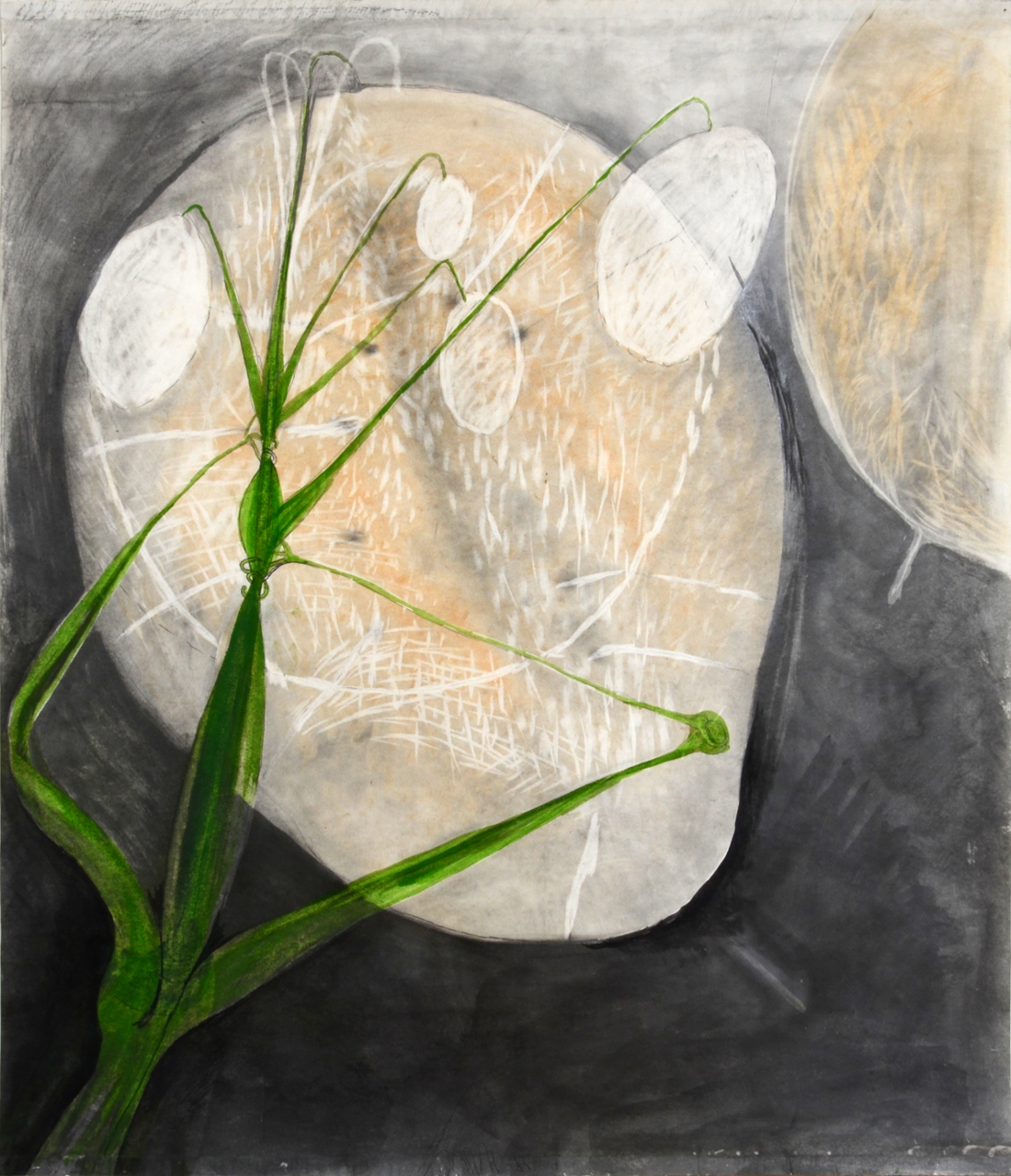
Pale Faces, graphite, copperplate ink, chalk, paper, 2005

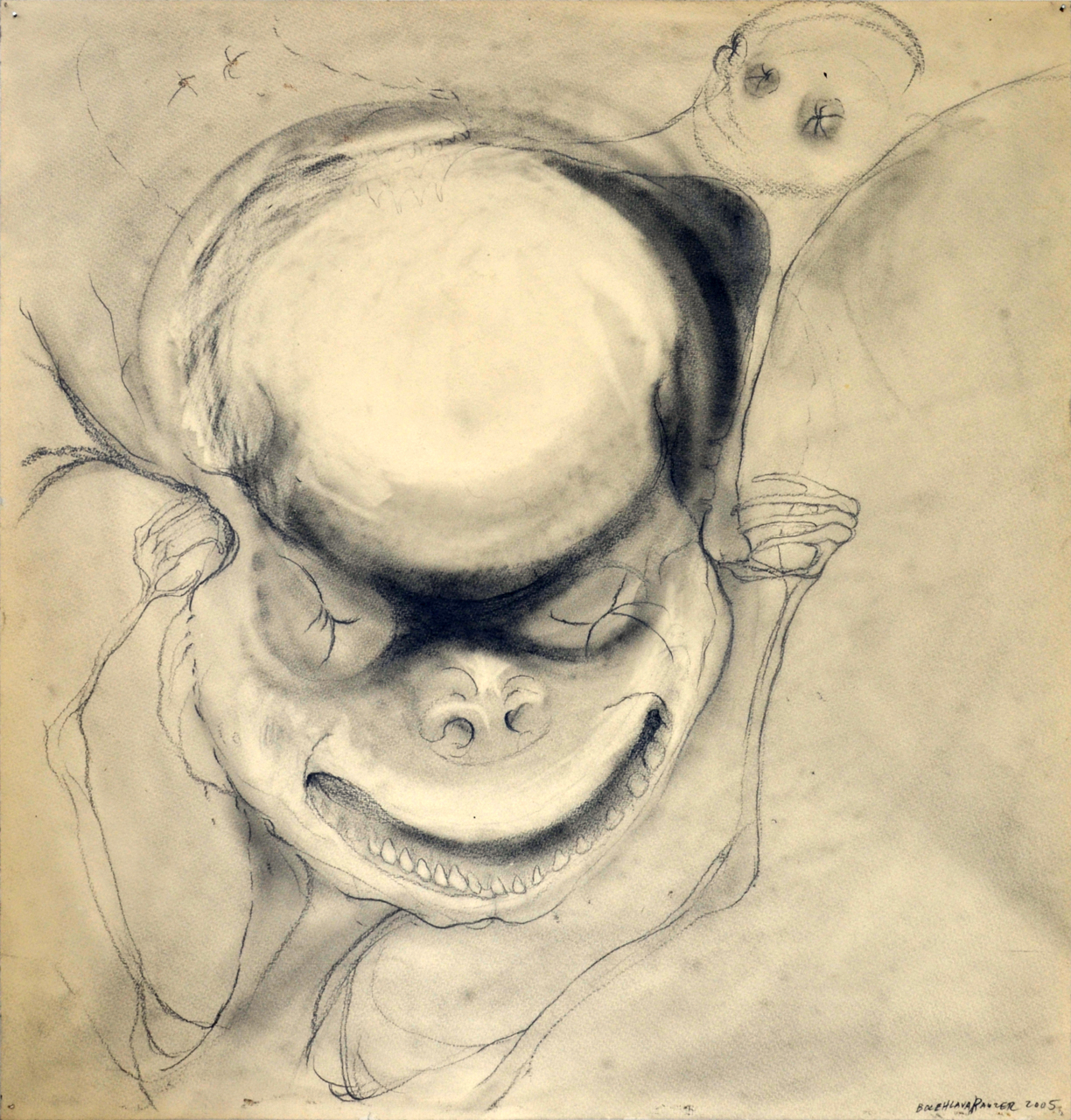
Headacher, graphite, paper, 2005

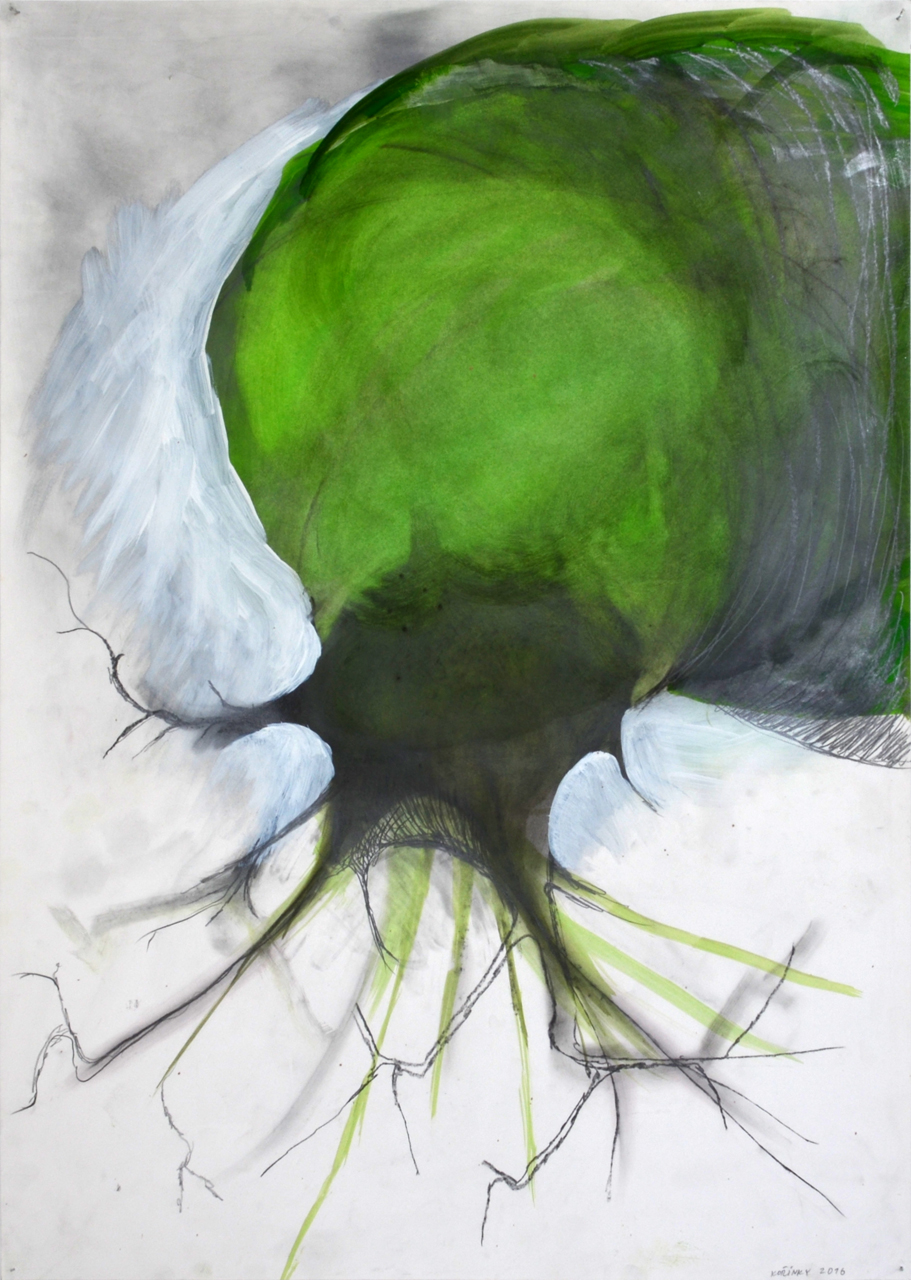
Little Roots II, watercolour, graphite, acrylic, 2016

=== Representation in collections ===
- National Gallery in Prague
- Moravian Gallery in Brno
- Aleš South Bohemia Gallery in Hluboká nad Vltavou
- Klatovy / Klenová Gallery
- Gallery of Fine Art in Ostrava
- Czech Museum of Fine Arts
- North Bohemian Gallery of Fine Art in Litoměřice
- Gallery of Modern Art in Roudnice nad Labem
- Regional Gallery in Liberec
- Benedikt Rejt Gallery in Louny
- Private collections at home and abroad

=== Selected exhibitions ===
- 1966 Exhibition of the Young / Exposition des jeunes, House of the Lords of Kunštát, Brno
- 1968 Sex Från Prag, Konstforum, Norrköping, Stenhusgården, Linköping, Sweden
- 1968 300 painters, sculptors, printmakers of 5 generations for 50 years of the Republic, Prague
- 1969 Zestien Tsjechische kunstenaars. Dertien grafici en drie keramisten, Galerie de Tor, Amsterdam
- 1969 Junge Künstler aus der ČSSR, Haus am Kleistpark, Berlin
- 1970 Sodobna češkoslovaška umetnost, Mestna galerija Ljubljana, Mestna galerija Piran, Salon ULUH, Zagreb
- 1970 Confrontation II, Nova Gallery, Prague
- 1983 3. Biennale der Europäischen Grafik, Baden-Baden
- 1989 L´Europe des Graveurs, Bibliothèque municipale, Grenoble
- 1989 Restoration Art 1948–1988, Mánes Gallery, Prague
- 1990/91 New group: member exhibition, Prague, Opava, Sýpka Gallery, Vlkov
- 1991 Counter the Wall, Fronta Gallery, Prague
- 1992 Contemporary East European Ceramics, The Clay Studio, Philadelphia
- 1992 Czech Fine Art 1960–1990, Central Bohemian Gallery, Prague
- 1992/2003 Minisalon, Prague, Mons, Cincinnati, New York, Hollywood, Albuquerque, Indianapolis, Chicago, Rapids, North Dartmouth, St. Petersburg, Florida, Columbia, Prague Castle, Brussels, Ubud, Surabaya, Jakarta, Paris
- 1993/94 New Figuration, North Bohemian Gallery of Fine Arts in Litoměřice, East Bohemia Gallery, Pardubice, Moravian Gallery in Brno, House of Art, Opava, Regional Gallery of the Highlands in Jihlava
- 1996 Neuburg An Der Donau - Rathausplatz, Regensburg - Salzstadel
- 1996/97 Umění zastaveného času / Art when time stood still, Czech Art Scene 1969–1985, Prague, Brno, Cheb
- 1999 The Art of Accelerated Time. Czech Art Scene 1958 - 1968, Prague, Cheb
- 2000 Two Ends of the Century 1900, 2000, House of the Black Mother of God, Prague
- 2005 Osteuropäische Keramik - Geforme Erde, Oberpfälzer Künstlerhaus, Schwandorf
- 2008/09 Czech and Slovak Art of the 1960s, Zlín, Ostrava
- 2009 Sculpture and the City of Liberec 1969. Exhibition about the exhibition, Regional Gallery in Liberec
- 2010 New Sensitivity, National Art Museum of China, Beijing
- 2015 Karel Pauzer, Hana Purkrábková, Gallery of the State Castle and Chateau in Jindřichův Hradec
- 2017 Karel Pauzer / Hana Purkrábková: Bytosti / Creatures, Gallery of modern art, Roudnice nad Labem
- 2022 Karel Pauzer: Sochy a kresby / Sculptures and Drawings, Millennium Gallery, Prague
- 2025/2026 Karel Pauzer, Biosphera, Museum Kampa

== Sources ==
- Růžička Milouš, Vlček Tomáš: Contemporary Ceramics, 71 p., Odeon, Prague 1979 (cs)
- Chalupecký Jindřich: New Art in Bohemia, 173 pp, H&H, Jinočany, 1994, ISBN 80-85787-81-4 (cs)
- Šetlík Jiří: Cesty po ateliérech / Journeys through studios, 300 pp., Torst, Prague, ISBN 80-85639-89-0 (cs)

=== Author's catalogues ===
- Petrová Eva: Karel Pauzer, 12 s., Galerie Václava Špály, Praha 1969
- Neumannová Eva: Karel Pauzer: Grafika, 4 s., 1991
- Karel Pauzer: Grafika, 4 s., Galerie Ol, 1992
- Novotná Jarmila: Karel Pauzer, Moravská galerie v Brně 1993
- Kříž Jan: Karel Pauzer: Plastika kresba grafika z let 1964 – 1994, 16 s., České muzeum výtvarných umění v Praze 1994
- Jůza Jan: Karel Pauzer: Kresby, plastiky, 6 s., 2005
- Drury Richard: Karel Pauzer, 2 s., G. Magna, Ostrava 2007
- Lazorčík M: Hana Purkrábková, Karel Pauzer / Vidět život, kat. 41 s., Galerie U bílého jednorožce, Klatovy 2017

=== Articles in journals ===
- Stará E.: Un exposition de ceramique..., Revue du Verre 1990, 2, 45 p. 31-36
- Klasová M.: Skulptur und Ton, Keramik Magazin 1995, 1, 17, p. 13-15
- Knyrim Hawe: Osteuropäische Keramik - Geforme Erde, Neue Keramik 2005, 6, p. 36-37
