= Černí baroni (film) =

1992 Czechoslovak comedy film

- Directed by: Zdenek Sirový
- Screenplay by: Miloslav Švandrlík; Zdenek Sirový
- Story by: Miloslav Švandrlík
- Based on: Black Barons by Miloslav Švandrlík
- Starring: Pavel Landovský; Bronislav Poloczek; Alois Švehlík; Jiří Schmitzer; Miroslav Donutil; Josef Dvořák
- Cinematography: Jiří Macháně
- Edited by: Ivana Kačírková
- Music by: Luboš Fišer
- Production company: Space films
- Distributed by: Barrandov Studios
- Release date: 4 June 1992
- Running time: 110 minutes
- Country: Czechoslovakia
- Languages: Czech; Slovak

Černí baroni is a Czechoslovak comedy film released in 1992. The movie is directed by Zdenek Sirový and stars Václav Vydra, Jan Kraus, Miroslav Donutil, Jiří Schmitzer, and Ondřej Vetchý. It is based on the 1969 novel Černí baroni by Miloslav Švandrlík.

== Synopsis ==
The film presents "Pétepáky"—members of the Technical auxiliary battalion—an army battalion formed by people known as class enemies of communism in Czechoslovakia in the 1950s. The group includes intellectuals, people of bourgeois origins, peasants, religious adherents, etc. This group is offset by their commanders, who are uneducated but politically active. From the clashes between the two groups, absurd situations arise, parodying the conditions of the period in Czechoslovak history.

== Cast ==
- Pavel Landovský as Major Haluška "Terazky"
- Bronislav Poloczek as Captain Ořech
- Alois Švehlík as Captain Honec
- Jiří Schmitzer as Lieutenant Hamáček
- Miroslav Donutil as Lieutenant Troník
- Josef Dvořák as Lieutenant Mazurek
- Rudolf Hrušínský Jr. as Dr. Hořec
- Václav Postránecký as General
- Daniel Landa as Private Halík
- Ondřej Vetchý as Private Kefalín
- Vladimír Javorský as Private Jasánek
- Milan Šimáček as Private Vata
- Boris Rösner as Private Macháček
- Zdeněk Podhůrský as soldier Vločka
- Michal Dosedla as Private Nalezenec
- Jan Kraus as Private Voňavka
- Jaromír Dulava as Private Štětka
- Václav Vydra as Private Šternberk
- Milan Gunár as Private Kotlár
- Jiří Fero Burda as Private Ciml
- Michal Dlouhý as Corporal Fišer
- Miroslav Táborský as Corporal Voháňka
- Milan Sandhaus as Master Francl
- Štěpánka Lisá as Andula
- Josef Somr as Innkeeper
- Hana Čížková as Magda
