= Černí baroni (novel) =

1969 novel by Miloslav Švandrlík

- Author: Miloslav Švandrlík
- Original title: Černí baroni aneb Válčili jsme za Čepičky
- Language: Czech
- Genre: Satire
- Set in: 1950–54 Czechoslovakia
- Published: 1969
- Publisher: Vysočina (Havlíčkův Brod)
- Publication place: Czechoslovakia
- Media type: Print

Černí baroni (Black barons) is a satirical novel written by Miloslav Švandrlík during the period of the Prague Spring and published in 1969. Subsequent publication of the book in Czechoslovakia was only made possible after the Velvet Revolution, in 1990. The work takes as its background one of the "technical auxiliary battalions" of the Czechoslovak People's Army. The subtitle Válčili jsme za Čepičky (We fought for Čepička) is a reference to then-Minister of Defense, Alexej Čepička. The story was made into a film of the same name in 1992 and a television series in 2003.

== Background ==
The first part of the book was published in 1969 by Vysočina (Havlíčkův Brod) and consists of seventeen chapters, ending with one of the main characters, Kefalín, desperate to extend his service for another year, getting drunk on cider. Švandrlík continued writing the second part, though due to the post-Prague Spring normalization, it could not be published in Czechoslovakia. The author went into exile and in 1975, published the second part of the book in Zurich, under the pseudonym Rudolf Kefalín. It was also published in 1988 by Alexander Tomský's publishing house Rozmluvy, in London. At the same time, the work spread via samizdat in Czechoslovakia. Both parts, consisting of 29 chapters, were published as a whole in the 1990 edition, after the Velvet Revolution.

== Plot ==
The novel presents a satirical depiction of the Czechoslovak People's Army not long after the end of World War II. The author focuses on the day-to-day joys and sorrows of soldiers in a technical auxiliary battalion, a forced labour military camp for the internment and re-education of persons considered disloyal to the Communist regime. These units were active between 1950 and 1954. The story takes place at Zelená Hora Castle, in the town of Nepomuk.

== Associated publications ==
After the Velvet Revolution of 1989, Švandrlík wrote a number of sequels and spin-off novels to Černí baroni:

- Říkali mu Terazky aneb šest půllitrů u Jelínků
- Pět sekyr poručíka Hamáčka
- Lásky Černého barona
- Kam to kráčíš, Kefalíne?
- Růžové sny pilného hňupa aneb Poručíme větru, dešti
- Černí baroni po čtyřiceti letech
- Černí baroni těsně před kremací
- Stoletý major Terazky
- Černý baron od Botiče
- Terazky na hrad
- Terazkyho poslední džob
- Terazky v tunelu doktora Moodyho
- Nesmiřitelný Terazky
- Černí baroni útočí na obrazovku

== Legacy ==
The book was adapted as a 1992 film and a 2004 television series.
