= Jiří Šetlík =

Czech art historian and academic (1940–2023)

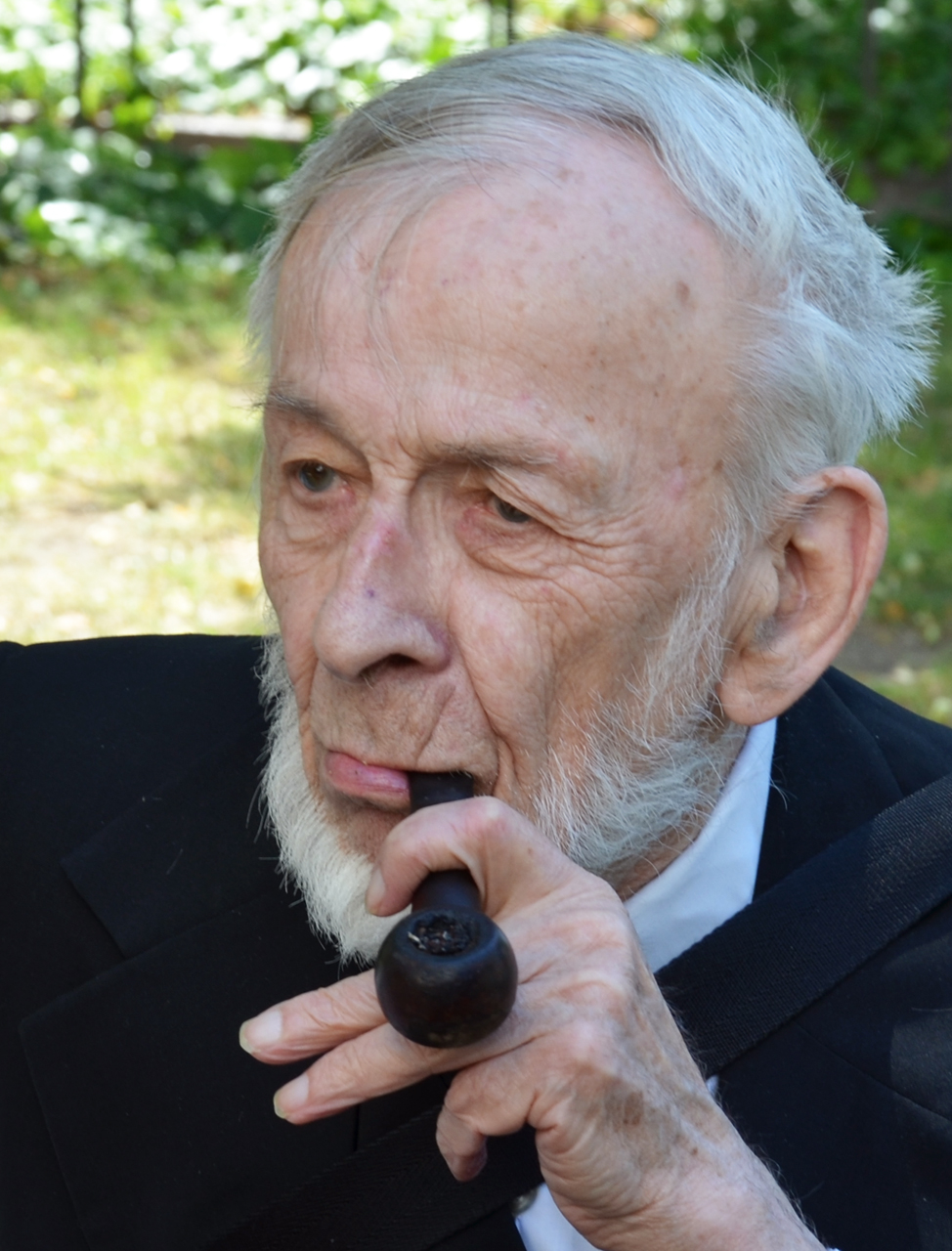
- Šetlík in 2017
- Born: 2 April 1929; Prague, Czechoslovakia
- Died: 28 January 2023 (aged 93); Prague, Czech Republic

Jiří Šetlík (2 April 1929 – 28 January 2023) was a Czech art historian, art critic and academic.

== Life and career ==
Born in Prague, Šetlík was the son of the founder of the pharmaceutical company Spojené farmaceutické závody Ivan Šetlík, a political dissident who was condemned to two and a half years in prison for espionage in a show trial. The mother was an employee in the administration of the Czech Philharmonic.

Šetlík studied Art History and Aesthetics at Charles University, graduating in 1953. After serving three years of military service in the army auxiliary battalions (PTP) as an "enlightenment officer", he got a doctorate in History and Theory of Art at the Czechoslovak Academy of Sciences. He then worked at the National Gallery Prague until 1964, when he became editor-in-chief of the art magazine Výtvarná práca, which he characterized as a liberal and pluralistic magazine also covering the western art scene. In 1968 he was nominated director of the Museum of Decorative Arts, a role he lost in 1971, when because of the normalization he was declassed as a low-rank museum employee, being also forbidden to publish anything.

Following the Velvet Revolution, Šetlík held several important positions, notably as a lecturer and vice-rector of the Academy of Arts, Architecture and Design (1993–1996) and head of the Department of Art History at the Faculty of Architecture of the Technical University of Liberec (1996–2000), and reprised an intense writing activity. He was also a member of the Czech PEN Club, and the chairman of the Jindřich Chalupecký Society between 1994 and 2005.

Married to actress Zuzana Talpová until her death in 2005, Šetlík died on 28 January 2023, at the age of 93. He was the cousin of artist Adriena Šimotová.
