= Černí baroni (TV series) =

Czech television series

- Genre: Comedy
- Based on: Black Barons by Miloslav Švandrlík
- Screenplay by: Martin Bezouška
- Directed by: Juraj Herz
- Starring: Andrej Hryc; Radek Holub; Vítězslav Jandák; Tomáš Töpfer; Karel Heřmánek; Oldřich Kaiser; Bolek Polívka; Petr Rychlý; Petr Nárožný; Pavel Liška; Martin Myšička
- Composer: Míta Dencev
- Country of origin: Czechia
- Original language: Czech
- No. of seasons: 1
- No. of episodes: 11

Production
- Cinematography: Jiří Macháně
- Editor: Jan Svoboda
- Running time: 53 minutes
- Production company: Czech Television

Original release
- Release: 19 January – 29 March 2004

Černí baroni is a Czech television series that aired in 2004. It is based on a series of books by Miloslav Švandrlík, including Černí baroni (1990), Říkali mu Terazky (1991), and Pět sekyr poručíka Hamáčka (1993). The show takes as its background one of the "technical auxiliary battalions" of the Czechoslovak People's Army during the socialist era in Czechoslovakia.

== Cast and characters ==
- Andrej Hryc as Major Haluška
- Radek Holub as Private Kefalín
- Vítězslav Jandák as Captain Ořech
- Tomáš Töpfer as Captain Reich
- Karel Heřmánek as Captain Honec
- Oldřich Kaiser as Lieutenant Troník
- Bolek Polívka as Lieutenant Hamáček
- Petr Rychlý as Lieutenant Pecháček
- Petr Nárožný as General Mandel
- Pavel Liška as Private Ciml
- Martin Myšička as Private Šternberk
