= Miloslav Švandrlík =

Czech writer and humourist (1932–2009)

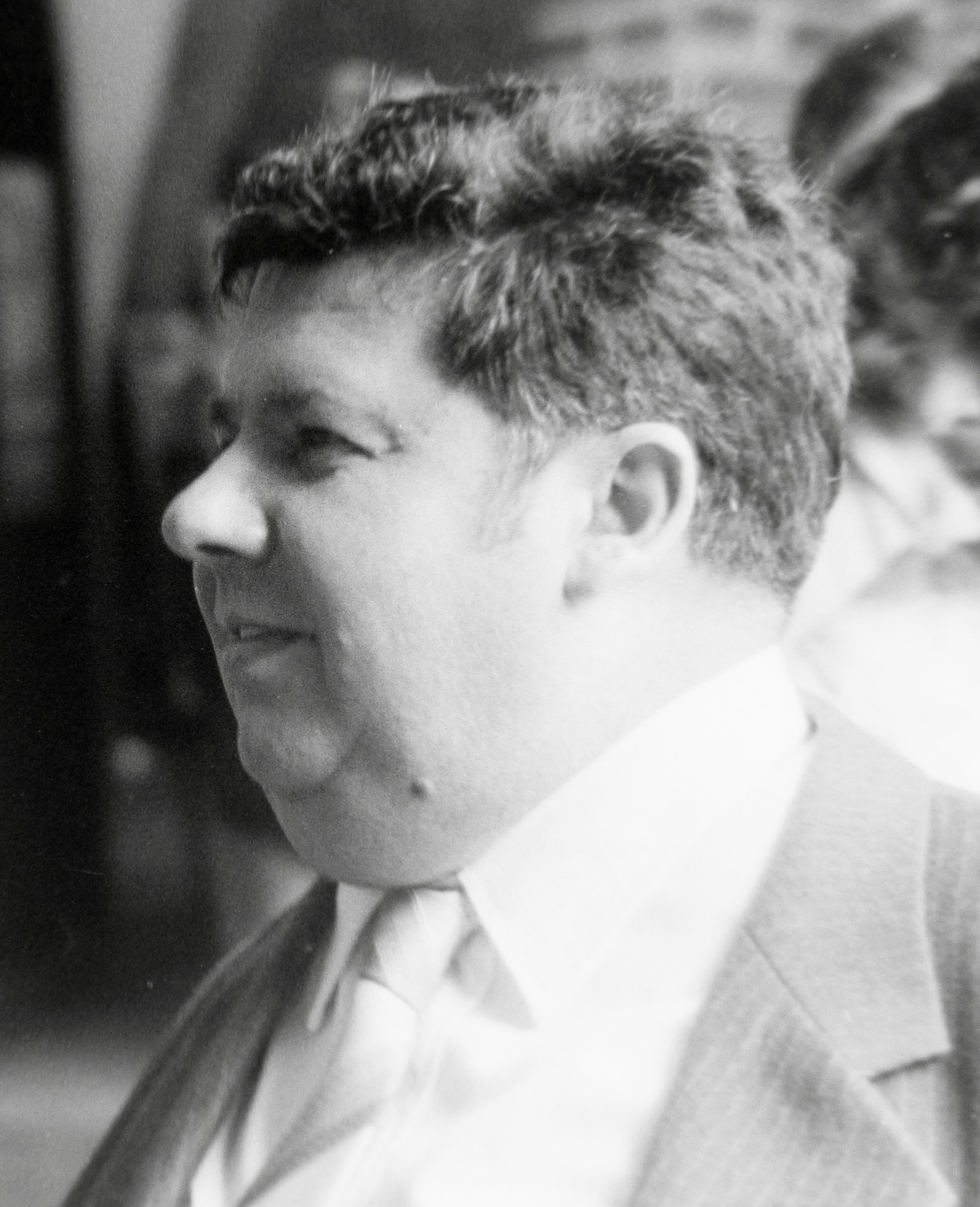
- Švandrlík in the 1980s
- Born: 10 August 1932; Prague, Czechoslovakia
- Died: 26 October 2009 (aged 77); Prague, Czech Republic
- Resting place: Kutná Hora, Czech Republic
- Occupations: Writer; humourist
- Writing career
- Pen name: Roman Kefalín
- Language: Czech
- Genres: Satire; humour; sci-fi; children's fiction
- Notable work: Black Barons

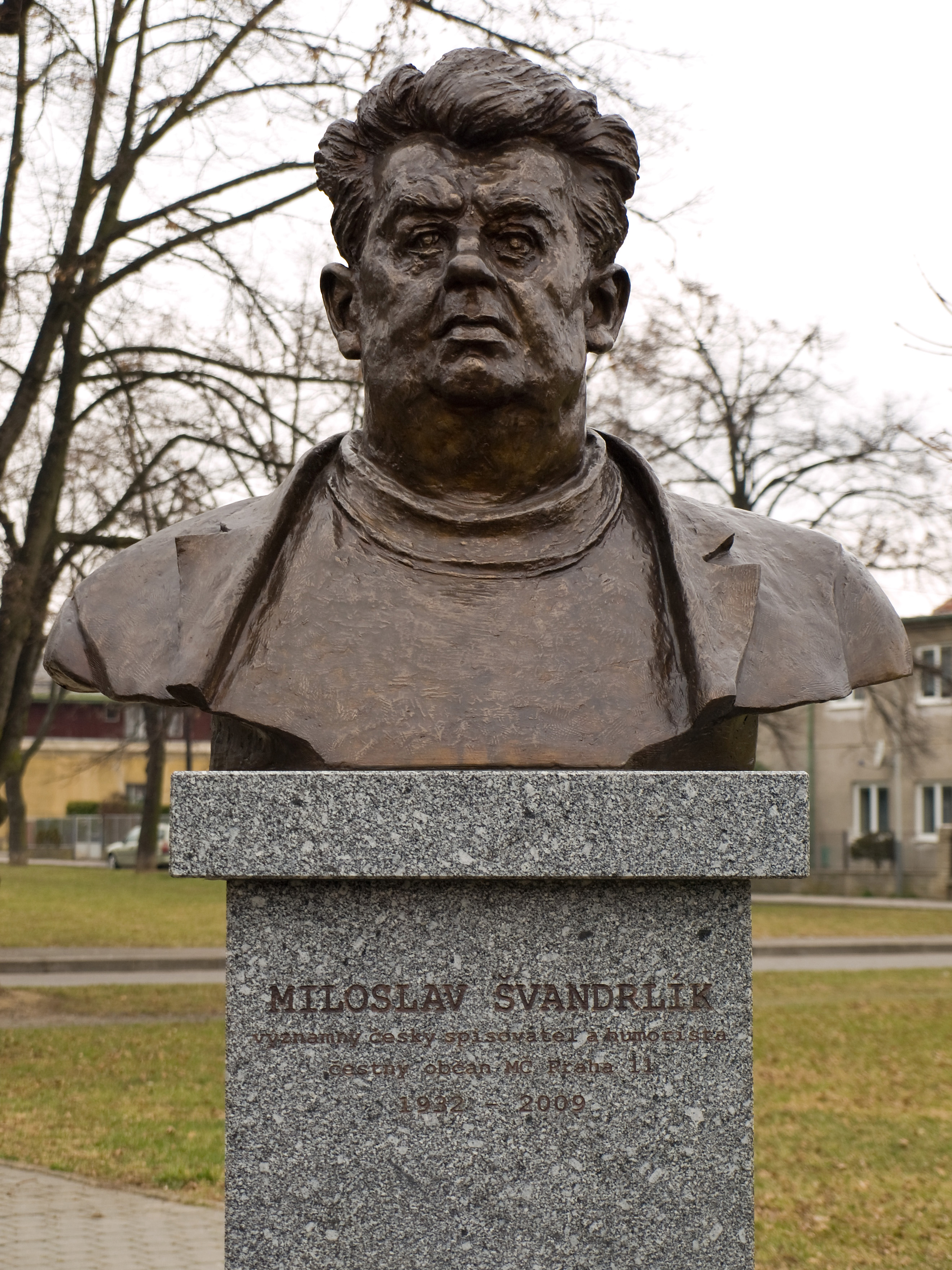
Bust of Švandrlík in Chodov, Prague

Miloslav Švandrlík (10 August 1932 – 26 October 2009) was a Czech writer and humorist. He also used the pseudonym Roman Kefalín.

== Life and work ==
Miloslav Švandrlík was born in Prague, Czechoslovakia, in 1932. After finishing secondary school, Švandrlík took a number of jobs and also completed a two-year teaching course at a music college in Prague. Subsequently in 1950, he obtained his matura diploma. Between 1951 and 1953, he studied at the Faculty of Theatre in Prague, but left after two years.

After completing his studies, Švandrlík became an assistant director at the Vesnické Theatre in Prague. He joined the Auxiliary Technical Unit of the Czechoslovak Army (compulsory at the time) in October 1953. He left in the winter of 1955, and worked as a teaching assistant for Korean children in Liběšice before becoming a professional writer. Most of his work was humorous and satirical, but he is also known for his science fiction and children's books.

One of his most famous books, titled Černí baroni (Černí Baroni aneb Válčili jsme za Čepičky), is based on stories from the time he served in the military. It portrays the irony and absurdity of life under Communism. The novel was adapted to film in 1992 under the title Černí baroni.

Švandrlík contributed regularly to a number of magazines and newspapers, such as Dikobraz and also to theatre. In his written work, he often cooperated with Jiří Winter Neprakta, mostly coming up with texts for Winter's drafted jokes. He also wrote a number of screenplays and radio plays.

Švandrlík died in Prague on 26 October 2009 and was buried at the Church of the Holy Trinity in Kutná Hora.

== Selected publications ==
- Z chlévů i bulvárů (1960)
- Krvavý Bill viola (1961)
- Od Šumavy k Popokatepetlu (1962)
- Kovbojská romance (1964)
- Hrdinové a jiní podivíni (1969)
- Drakulův švagr (1970)
- Mořský vlk a veselá vdova aneb Proti všem (1970)
- Neuvěřitelné příhody žáků Kopyta a Mňouka (1973)
  - Žáci Kopyto a Mňouk a mimozemšťané
  - Žáci Kopyto a Mňouk opět zasahují
  - Žáci Kopyto a Mňouk a lesní netvor
  - Žáci Kopyto a Mňouk a stříbrňáci
  - Žáci Kopyto a Mňouk v jihlavských katakombách
  - Žáci Kopyto a Mňouk a černá magie
  - Žáci Kopyto a Mňouk, postrach Posázaví
  - Žáci Kopyto a Mňouk na stopě
  - Žáci Kopyto a Mňouk a náměsíčníci
  - Žáci Kopyto a Mňouk a maharadžova pomsta
  - Žáci Kopyto a Mňouk a akta X
  - Žáci Kopyto a Mňouk a ryšavý upír
- Doktor od jezera Hrochů (1980)
- Dívka na vdávání (1983)
- Muž, který se topil (1985)
- Šance jako hrom (1989)
- Vražda mlsného humoristy (1990)
- Černí baroni aneb Válčili jsme za Čepičky (1990)
- Ještě máme co jsme chtěli (1991)
- Starosti korunovaných hlav (1992)
- Na nebožtíka vypadáte skvěle (1992)
- Sexbomba na doplňkovou půjčku (1994)
- Blanka oběť sexuálního harašení (2004)

After 1990, Švandrlík wrote a number of books that continued the story begun in Černí baroni:

- Říkali mu Terazky aneb šest půllitrů u Jelínků (1991)
- Lásky Černého barona (1991)
- Kam to kráčíš, Kefalíne?
- Pět sekyr poručíka Hamáčka (1993)
- Černý baron od Botiče (1993)
- Černí baroni po čtyřiceti letech (1998)
- Růžové sny pilného hňupa aneb Poručíme větru, dešti (1999)
- Černí baroni těsně před kremací (1999)
- Stoletý major Terazky (2000)
- Terazky na hrad (2002)
- Terazkyho poslední džob (2002)
- Terazky v tunelu doktora Moodyho (2003)
- Nesmiřitelný Terazky (2003)
- Černí baroni útočí na obrazovku (2003)

== Honours and awards ==
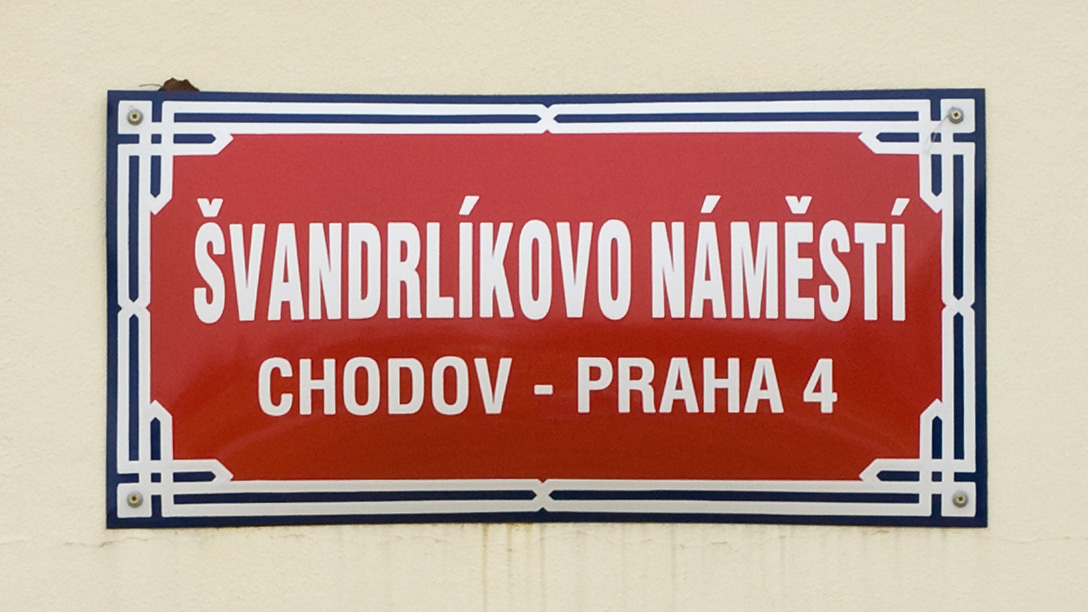
Švandrlíkovo square in Chodov, Prague

A few days before his death in 2009, Švandrlík became an honorary citizen of Prague 11.

On 21 April 2010, a field bordered by Skřivanova, Lažanského, Švabinského, and 7. května streets in Chodov was named after the writer. A bust of Švandrlík by Czech artist Miroslav Pangrác was unveiled there on 14 October 2010.

=== Bibliography ===
- Kdo je kdo : 91/92 : Česká republika, federální orgány ČSFR (in Czech). Vol. Part 2, N–Ž. Prague: Kdo je kdo. 1991. p. 987. ISBN 80-901103-0-4.
- Michael Třeštík, ed. (2005). Kdo je kdo = Who is who : osobnosti české současnosti : 5000 životopisů (in Czech) (5th ed.). Prague: Agentura Kdo je kdo. p. 666. ISBN 80-902586-9-7.
