= Technical auxiliary battalion =

Unit of the Czechoslovak People's Army active from 1950 to 1954

Technical auxiliary battalions (Czech: Pomocné technické prapory, PTP, Slovak: Pomocné technické prápory) or forced labor military camps (Czech: Vojenské tábory nucených prací, VTNP) were units of the Czechoslovak People's Army active from 1950 to 1954 in Czechoslovakia for the internment and re-education of persons considered disloyal. These were essentially forced labour camps.

== Background ==
An important reason for its creation was also securing cheap labour for selected industries, mainly mining and construction. They were also a tool of persecution and work exploitation of politically uncomfortable persons and class enemies. These included intellectuals ("intelligence"), members of the bourgeoisie ("buržoazní původ"), former nobility ("šlechta") and members of the clergy. The functioning of the Technical Auxiliary Battalions was not legally covered by the Czechoslovak laws in force and by international law. Uniforms of members of these camps had black shoulder boards, so they were colloquially called and known as the “Black Barons”. Although formally assigned to the military, they were not allowed to carry weapons. Instead, they had to do dangerous work in mines or factories. They received no significant remuneration, were treated more like slaves and ruined their health. A number of Czech and Slovak sportsmen, who were labelled as the „unreliable“, also worked, as the “Black Barons”, at constructions projects.

Approximately 60,000 Czechoslovak citizens were conscripted to the Technical Auxiliary Battalions, of which "some 400" lost their lives. They worked in the coal mines (in Ostrava and Kladno in the Czech lands, and also in Slovakia), in the construction industry (e. g. Prague settlement of Petriny), on military constructions (airports, barracks, residential buildings and other objects, e. g. military hospital in Prague), in military forests, quarries and agriculture.

== Dissolution ==
The last four of the more than 20 camps were dissolved in 1954. The facilities were also supervised by foreign intelligence services. For example, the CIA describes how the 57th Technical Auxiliary Battalion in Smečno was converted into a Technical Battalion in 1954. As a result, the situation of the former coercive members changed significantly: they received new clothes, were armed as regular members of the army and henceforth had a two-year military service instead of an indefinite duration. Those who had already completed two or more years were immediately demobilized.

== Commemoration ==
Miloslav Švandrlík's novel "Černí baroni" ("Black Barons"), published in 1969 and made into a film of the same name in 1992 and into a TV series in 2004, provided a lasting memory on a broad scale. Švandrlík's novel describes the situation in the Technical Battalions, not in the Technical Auxiliary Battalions, where the regime was completely different. In addition, there are also occasional memorial stones. This also applies to the town of Libavá, which was a military settlement in the Libavá military training area until the end of 2015. On the square in the center of the village, a memorial stone commemorates the members of the Technical Auxiliary Battalions.

== Literature ==
- Kaplan, Karel: Tábory nucené práce v Československu v letech 1948–1954 [Zwangsarbeitslager in der Tschechoslowakei in den Jahren 1948–1954]. In: Sešity ÚSD AV ČR 3. Praha 1992, 78-195, ISBN 80-85270-06-4
- Bílek, Jiří: Pomocné technické prapory v letech 1950–1954 [Die technischen Hilfsbatallione in den Jahren 1950–1954], 7-75.
