= Firiplaka =

Beach on Milos island, Greece

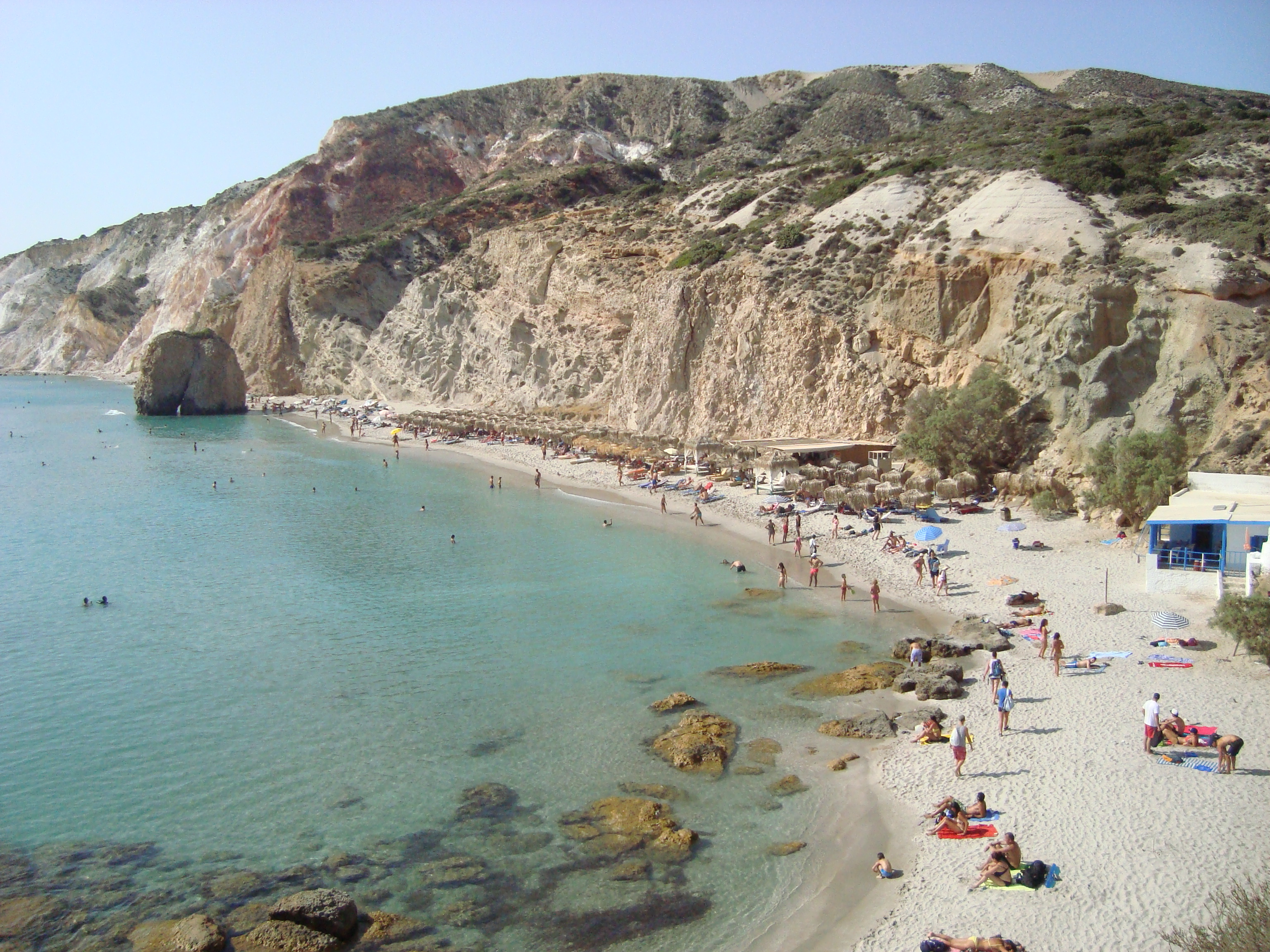
Firiplaka Beach

Firiplaka or Firiplaka Beach is a beach situated at the southern side in Milos Island, Greece between the other beaches of Provatas (West) and Tsigrado (East). It is one of the most popular beach on the island. The beach is extensive with majestic towering volcanic cliffs, snow-grey fine sand and white pebbles and shallow turquoise waters. There are umbrellas and sunbeds and a bar hut. There is also a huge rock with a cave under it in the water near the shore and it was sculptured out from a volcanic a long time ago. The access to the beach is possible by your own vehicle, taxi, bus or even boat which goes around the island from the port of Adamas. The largest part of the road is asphalt, however the last part of it, is a gravel paved driveway.

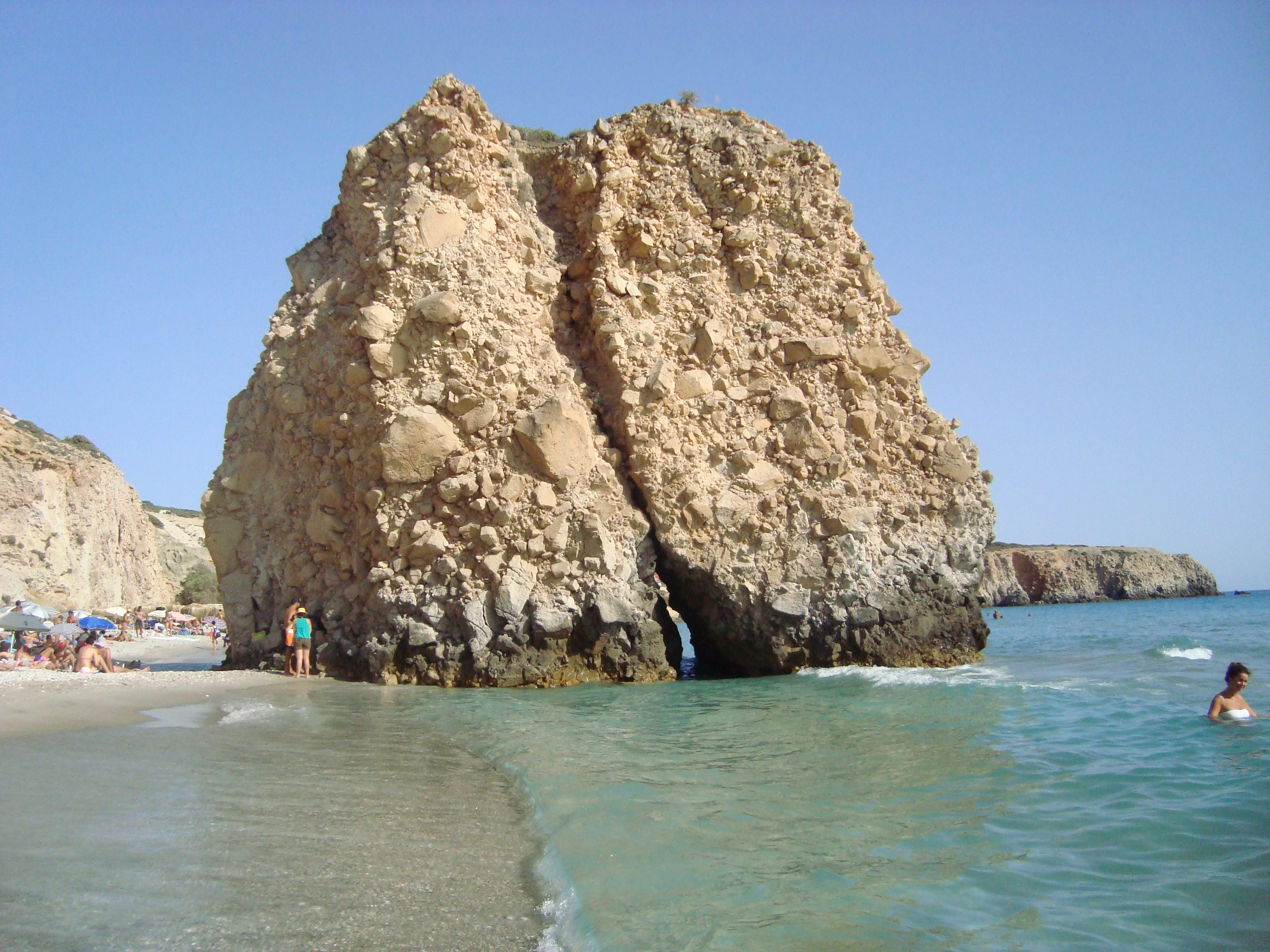
The Cave Rock

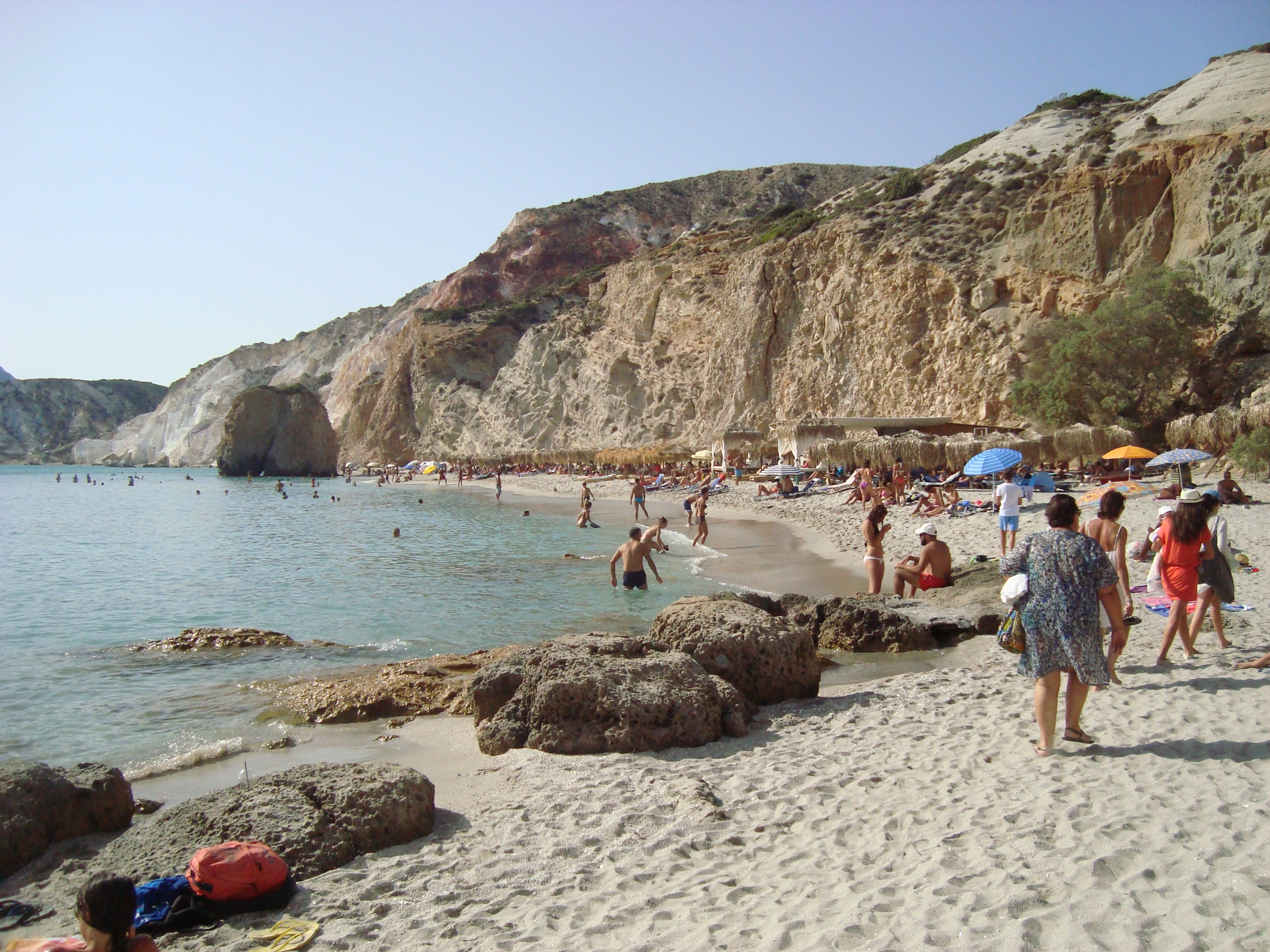
The Beach

== See also ==
- Sarakiniko Beach
- Arkoudes
- The Catacombs of Milos
- Plaka, Milos
