= Milos =

Island in Greece

Milos Μήλος
- Municipality
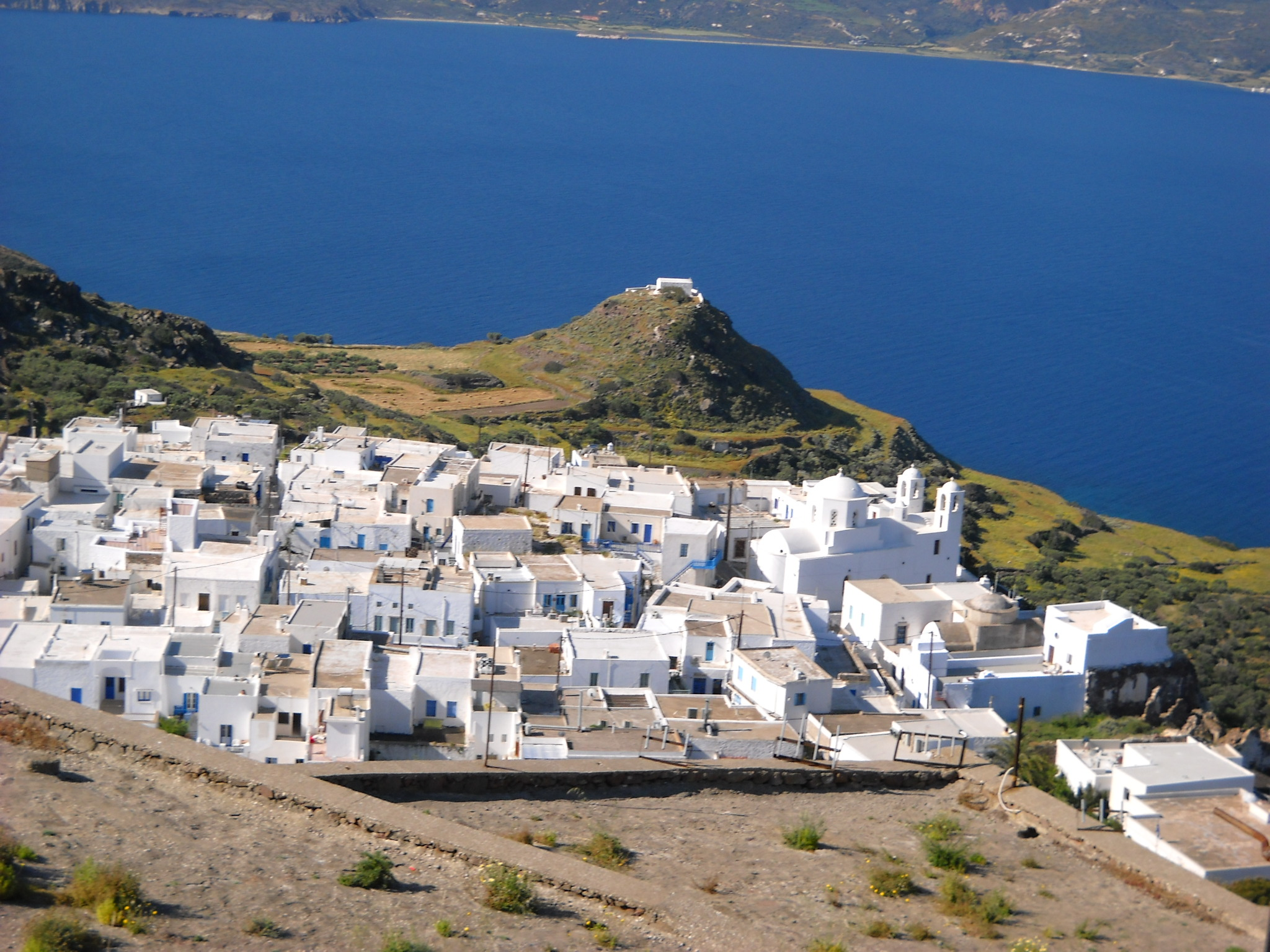
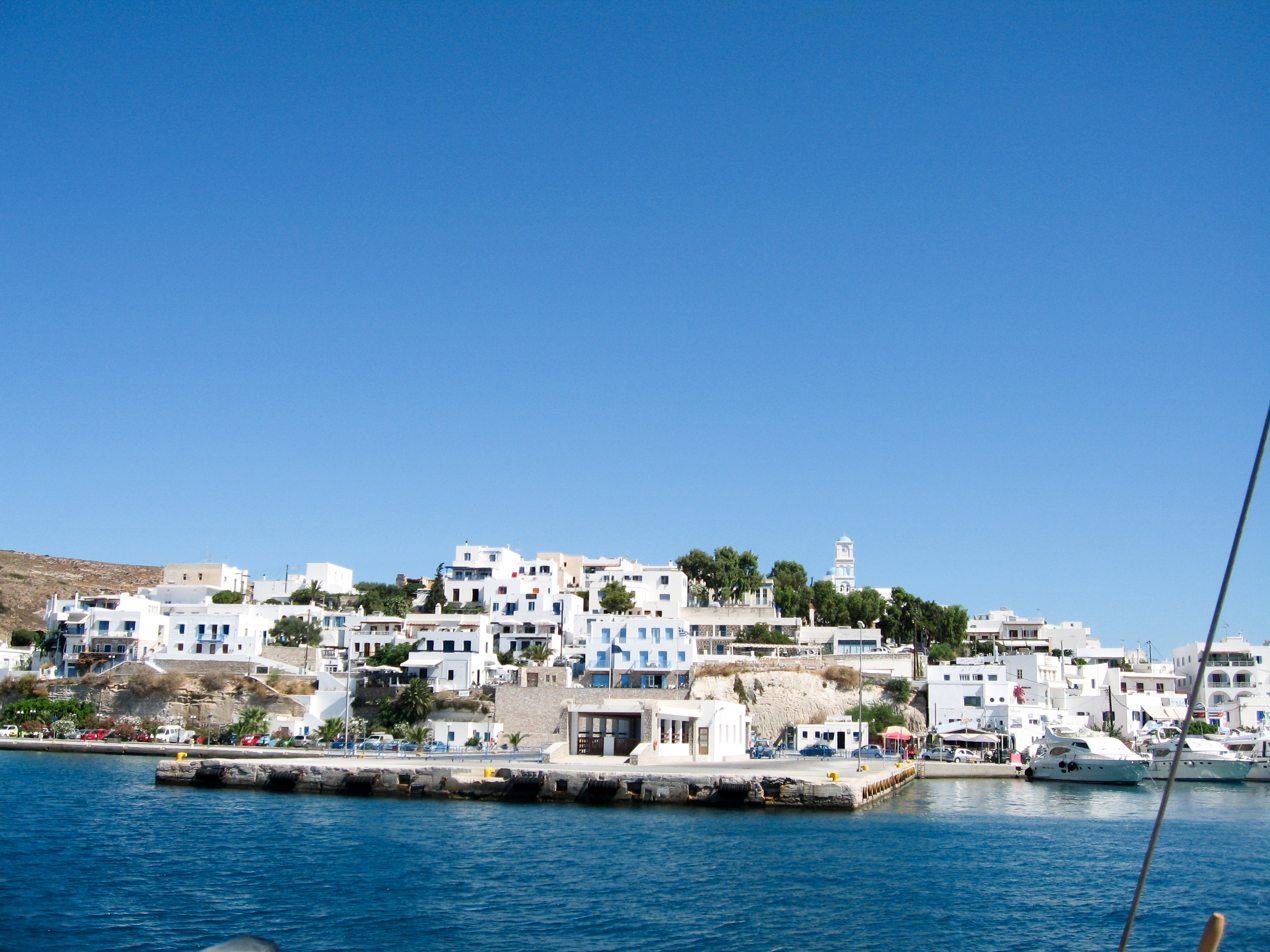
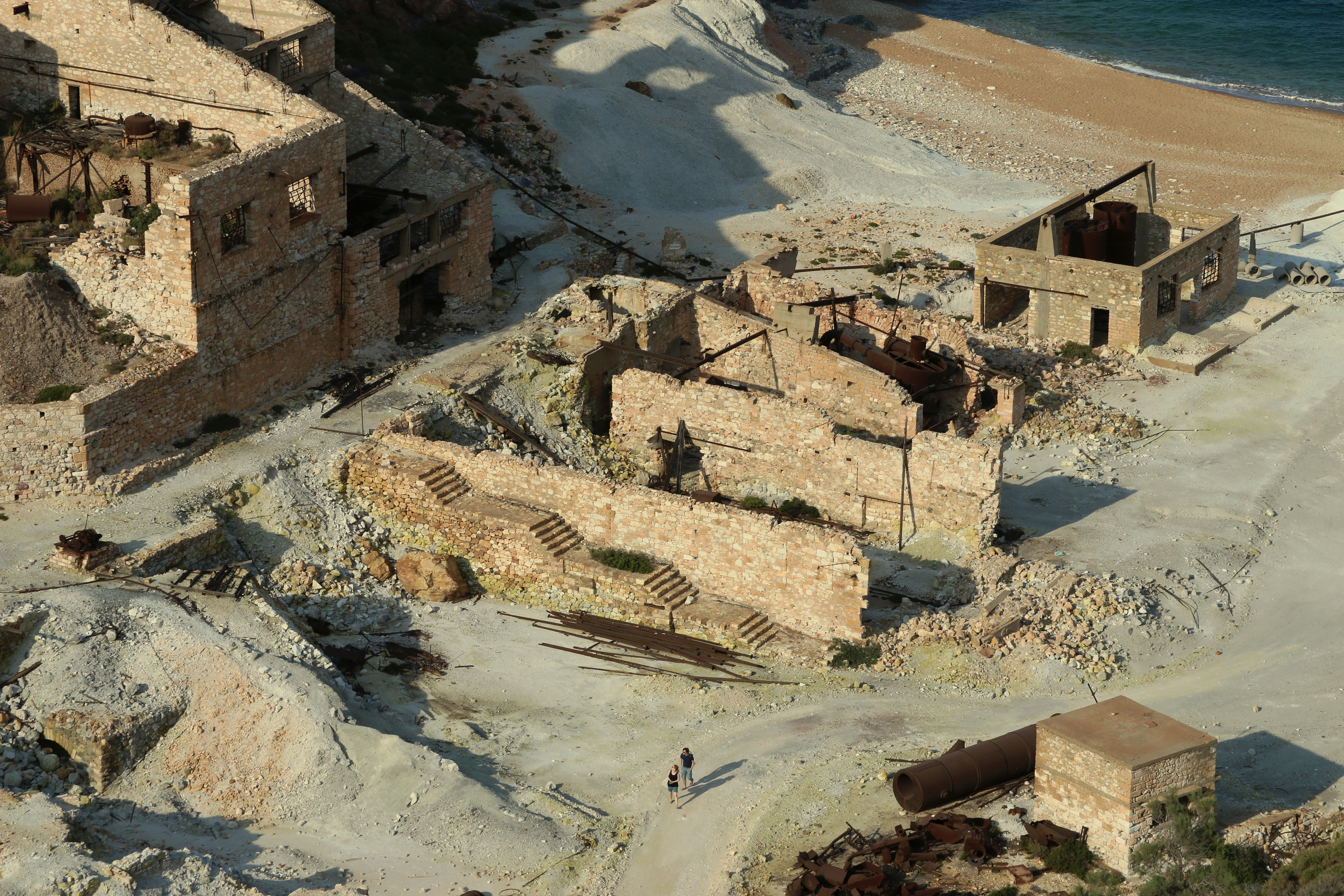
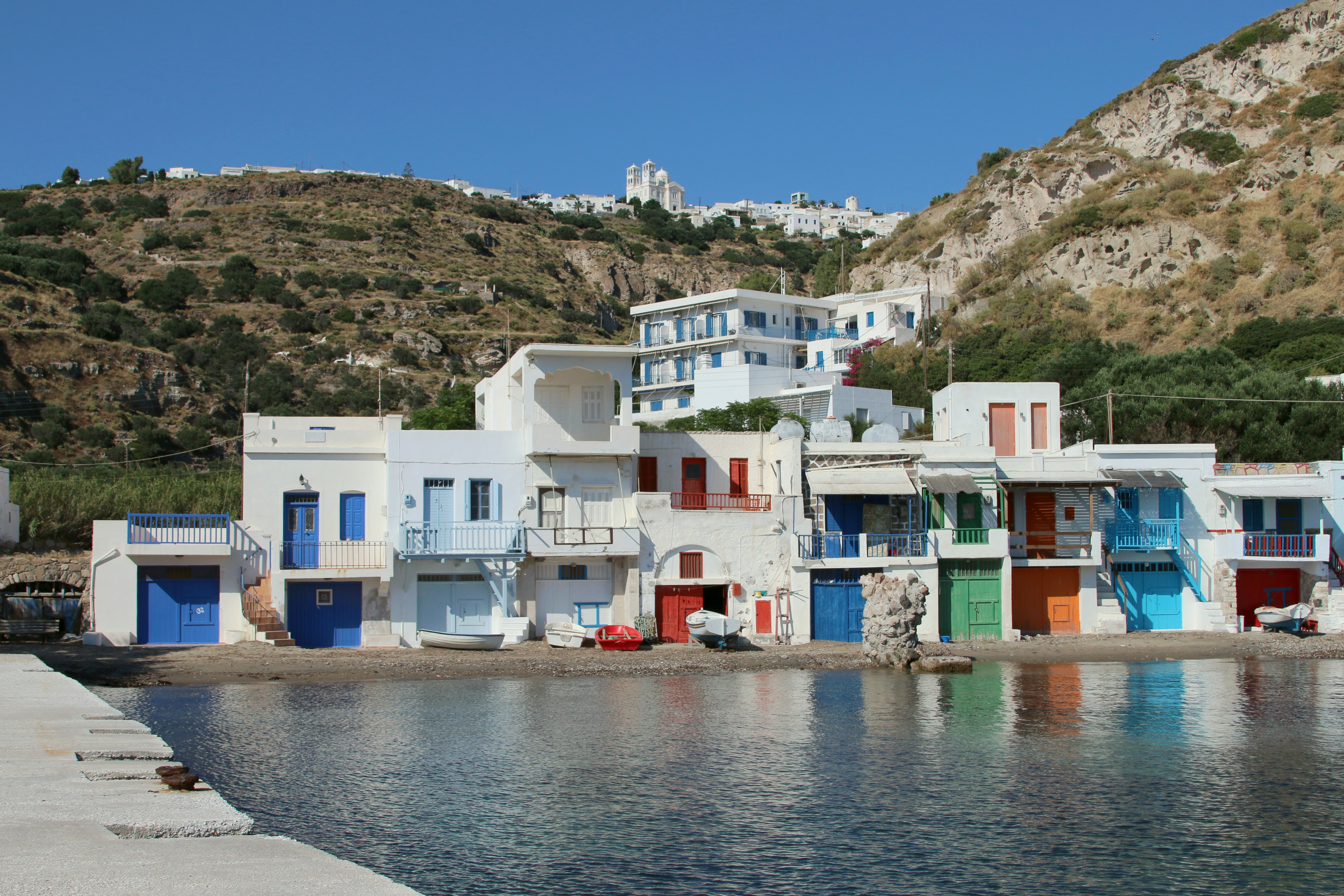
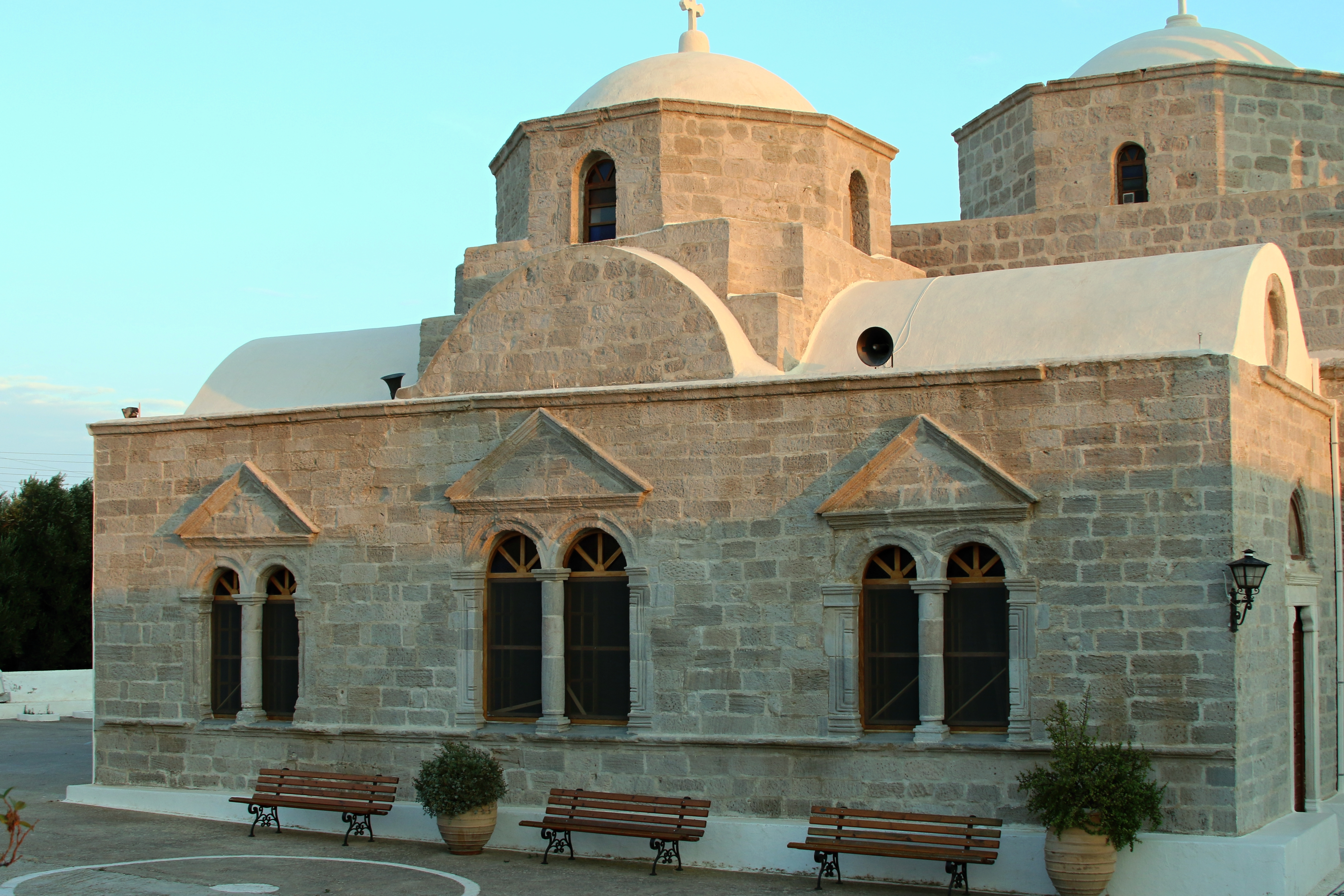
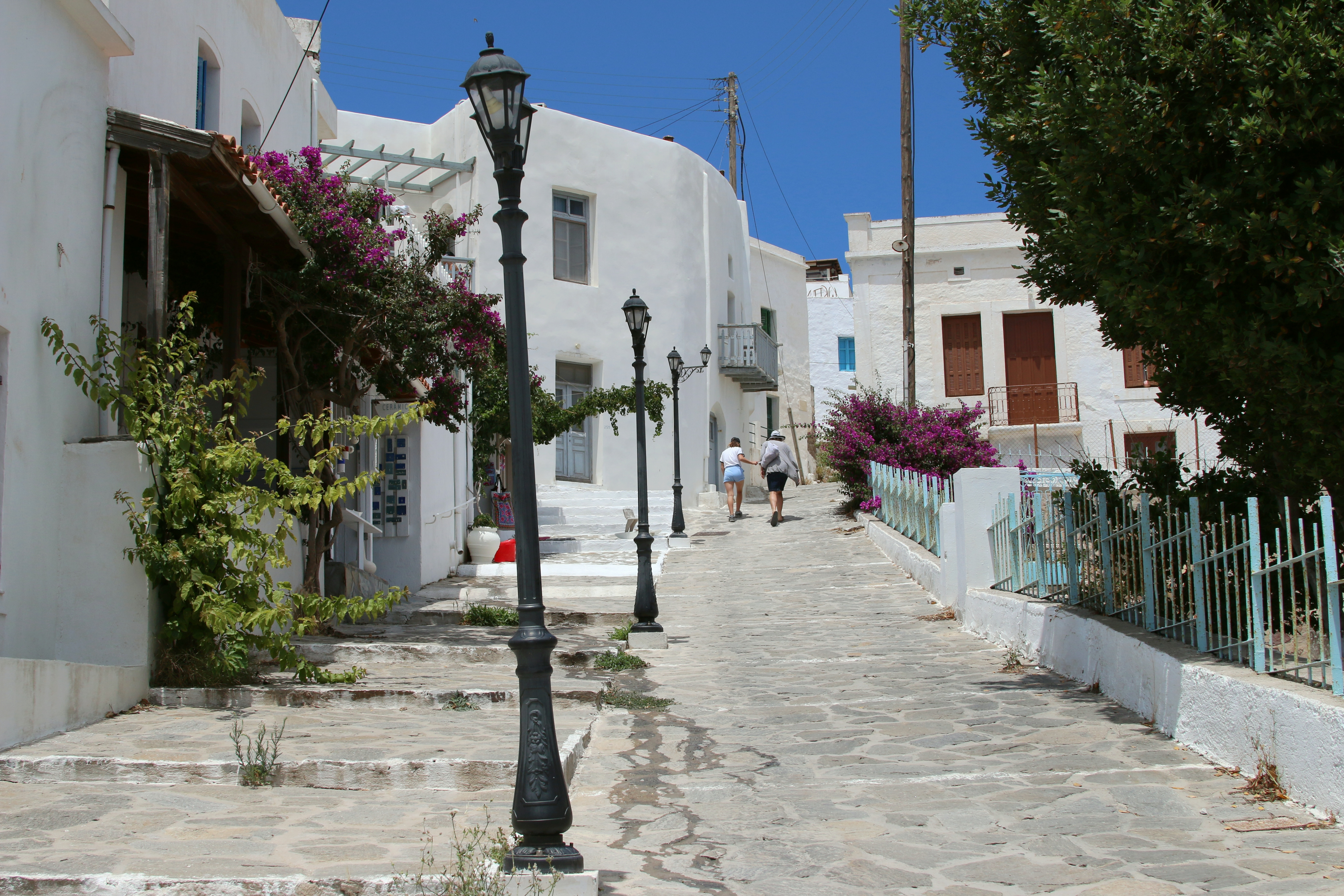
- From the top to the left: Plaka; view of the island; abandoned sulfur mines; Klima; Church of the Dormination of the Theotokos; street above the Archaeological Museum

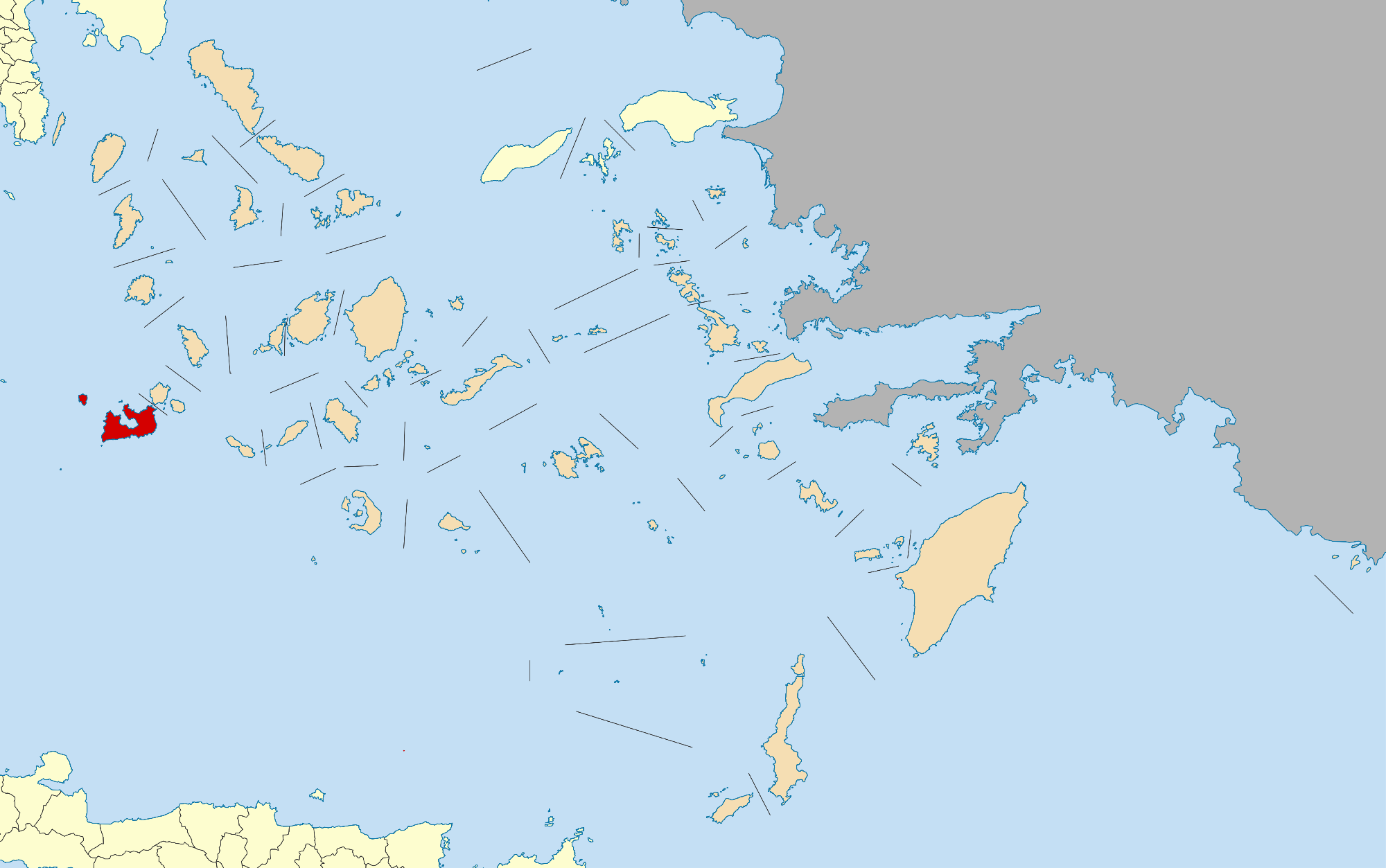

- Location within Greece
- Coordinates: 36.6875°N 24.4325°E
- Country: Greece
- Administrative region: South Aegean
- Regional unit: Milos
- Seat: Plaka

Area
  - Municipality: 150.6 km^{2} (58.1 sq mi)
- Highest elevation: 751 m (2,464 ft)
- Lowest elevation: 0 m (0 ft)

Population (2021)
  - Municipality: 5,302
  - Density: 35.21/km^{2} (91.18/sq mi)
- Time zone: UTC+2 (EET)
  - Summer (DST): UTC+3 (EEST)
- Postal code: 848 00, 848 01
- Area code: 2287
- Vehicle registration: EM
- Website: www.milos.gr

Milos or Melos (/ˈmiːlɒs, -loʊs/; Modern Greek: Μήλος, romanized: Mílos, IPA: [ˈmilos]; Ancient Greek: Μῆλος, romanized: Mêlos) is a volcanic Greek island in the Aegean Sea, just north of the Sea of Crete. It is the southwestern-most of the Cyclades islands.

Sculptures from Milos include the Venus de Milo (now in the Louvre), the Poseidon of Melos (now in the NAMA), the Asclepius of Milos (now in the British Museum), and an archaic Apollo now in Athens. Milos is a popular tourist destination during the summer. The municipality of Milos also includes the uninhabited offshore islands of Antimilos and Akradies. The combined land area is 160.147 square kilometres (61.833 sq mi) and at the 2021 census the population was 5,193 inhabitants.

== History ==
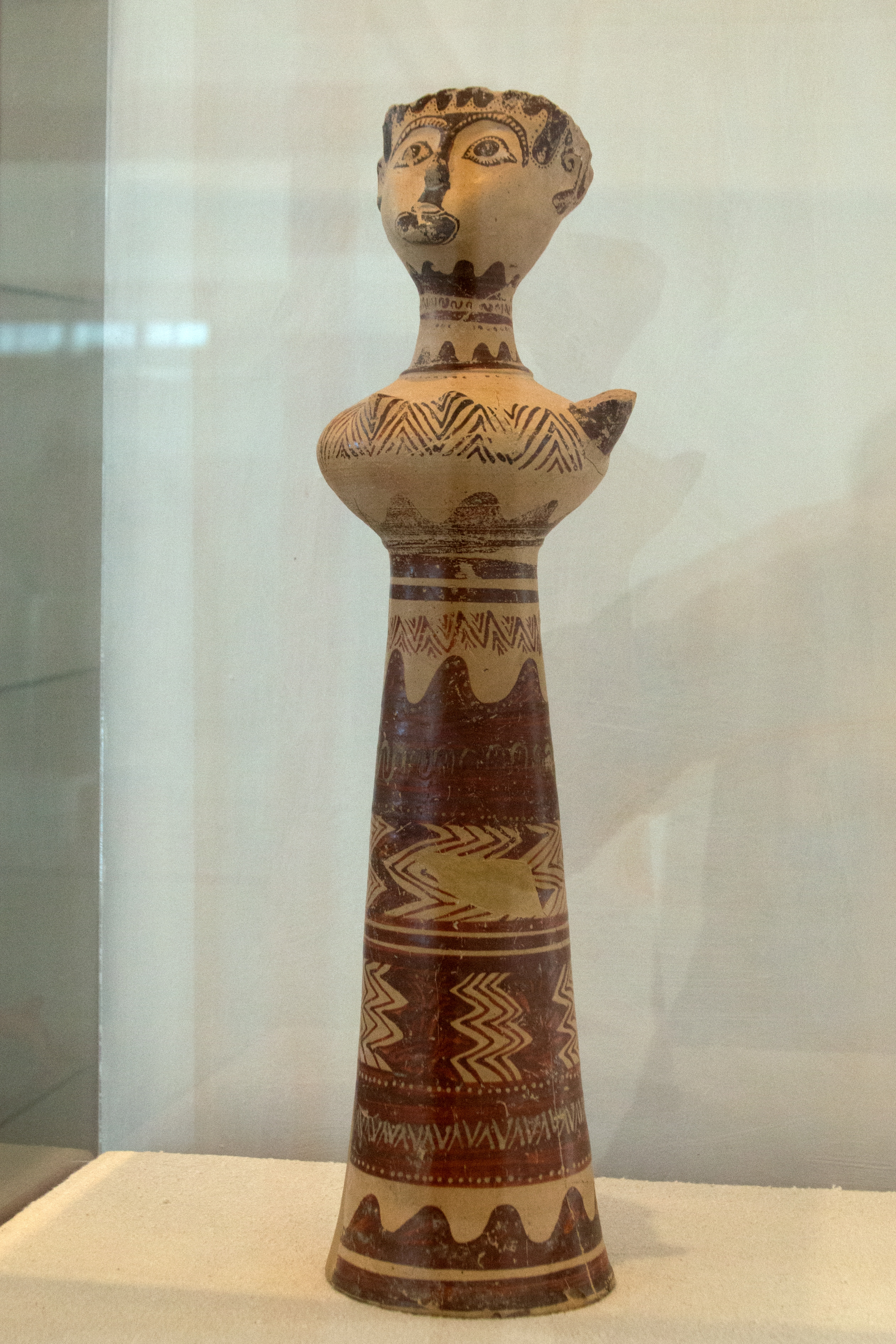
The Lady of Phylakopi (14th century BC) in the Archaeological Museum of Milos

Obsidian (a glass-like volcanic rock) from Milos was a commodity as early as 15,000 years ago. Obsidian from Milos was traded over long distances and fashioned into extremely sharp stone tools well before farming began and later: "There is no early farming village in the Near East that doesn't get obsidian". The mining of obsidian did not lead to the development of permanent habitation or manufacturing on the island. Instead, those in search of obsidian arrived by boat, beaching it in a suitable cove and cutting pieces of the volcanic glass from the quarries.

The position of Milos, between mainland Greece and Crete, and its possession of obsidian, made it an important centre of early Aegean civilisation. Milos lost its arms-making importance when bronze became the preferred material for the manufacture of weapons.

=== The Bronze Age ===
The first settlement at Phylakopi (Greek Φυλακωπή) arose in the Bronze Age, flourishing as the extraction of obsidian was in the decline. The first settlers were tuna fishermen. Lying on the north-east coast, 1896 excavations by the British School at Athens and later in 1973 by the British archaeologist Colin Renfrew, revealed a town wall and a Minoan-inspired structure, dubbed the Pillar room, which contained fragments of vivid wall paintings. The famous fresco of the flying fish was found in the ruins of the Pillar room and was executed with delicate colouring and graphic observation of nature in the graceful movement of a fish. Stylistic similarities to Minoan frescoes are suggested, and it could perhaps have been the work of a Cretan artist. Part of the site has been washed away by the sea.

The antiquities found at the site covered three major periods, from the Early Cycladic period to the Mycenaean period. At the site much pottery was excavated, with several changing styles and influences over the site's long occupation. In the early occupation of the site, there are many similarities and imports from other Cycladic islands and the settlement was very small. During the Middle Bronze Age however, the site expanded significantly and the expansion of Minoan Crete saw an influx of Minoan pottery into the Cyclades, particularly at Akrotiri on Thera, though much found its way to Phylakopi. The quantities found at the Cycladic sites have been taken to suggest a Minoan control over the region, though it could also be the consumptive nature of the islanders adopting Cretan fashions. There is more than just pottery at Phylakopi however, the eruption of the Thera volcano saw a reduction in Minoan presence in the Cyclades and it is at this time that Mycenaean involvement on the islands increases. At Phylakopi (and unknown in the rest of the Cyclades) a megaron structure, which is typically associated with the Mycenaean palaces, such as those at Tiryns, Pylos and Mycenae has been discovered. This has been taken to suggest that the Mycenaeans conquered the settlement and installed a seat of power for a governor. The evidence is not clear, though again it could be a legacy of the islanders adopting foreign elements into their culture. Particularly unexpected was the discovery in the 1970s of a shrine at the site, which contained many examples of Aegean figurines, including the famous "Lady of Phylakopi". The shrine is unprecedented in the Bronze Age Cyclades and has provided a valuable insight into the beliefs and rituals of the inhabitants of Phylakopi. The site was eventually abandoned and was never reoccupied.

=== Dorian settlement ===
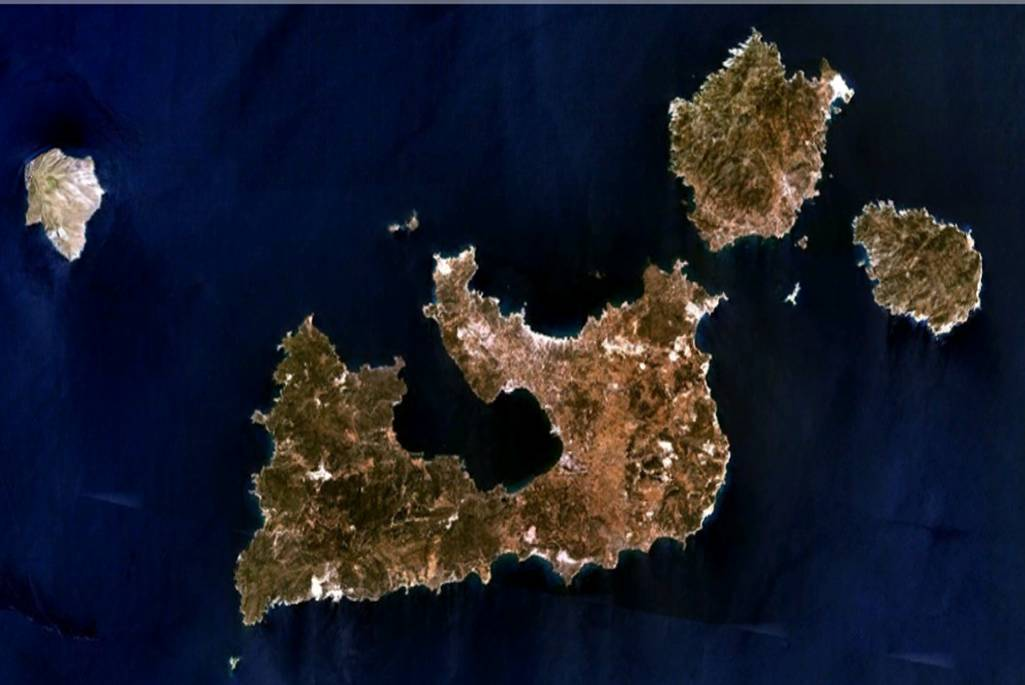
The approximate location of the ancient Dorian city, prior to the siege of 416 BC

The first Dorian settlement on Melos was established no earlier than the 1st millennium BC. Dorians are the ethnic group to which the Spartans belonged, but the Dorian settlers of Melos made themselves independent. They eventually established a city whose site lies on the eastern shore of the bay, just south-west of the present-day community of Trypiti.

From the 6th century BC up to the siege of 416 BC, Melos issued its own coinage, struck according to the Milesian weight standard: the base coin was the stater which weighed just over 14 grams. Melos was the only island in the Aegean Sea to use this standard. Most coins bore the image of an apple, which is a pun because the ancient Greek word for "apple" (mêlon) sounded similar to the name of the island. The coins also often bore the name of its people: ΜΑΛΙΟΝ (Malion - "of the Melians") or some abbreviation thereof.

By the 6th century BC, the Melians had also learned to write, and they used an archaic variant of the ancient Greek script that exhibited Cretan and Theraic influences. It was discarded after the siege of 416 BC.

	Α	Β	Γ	Δ	Ε	Ϝ	Ζ	Η	Η	Θ	Ι	Κ	Λ	Μ	Ν	Ξ	Ο	Π	Ϻ	Ϙ	Ρ	Σ	Τ	Υ	Φ	Χ	Ψ	Ω
Laconia (Sparta)								–											–								(φσ)	–
Attica (Athens)								–								(χσ)			–								(φσ)	–
Melos						–										(κϻ)						–			(πh)	(κh)	(πϻ)	

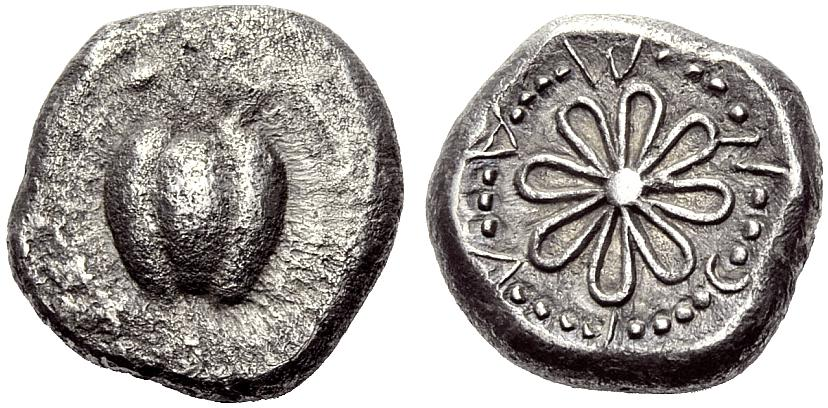
A Melian stater from the 5th century

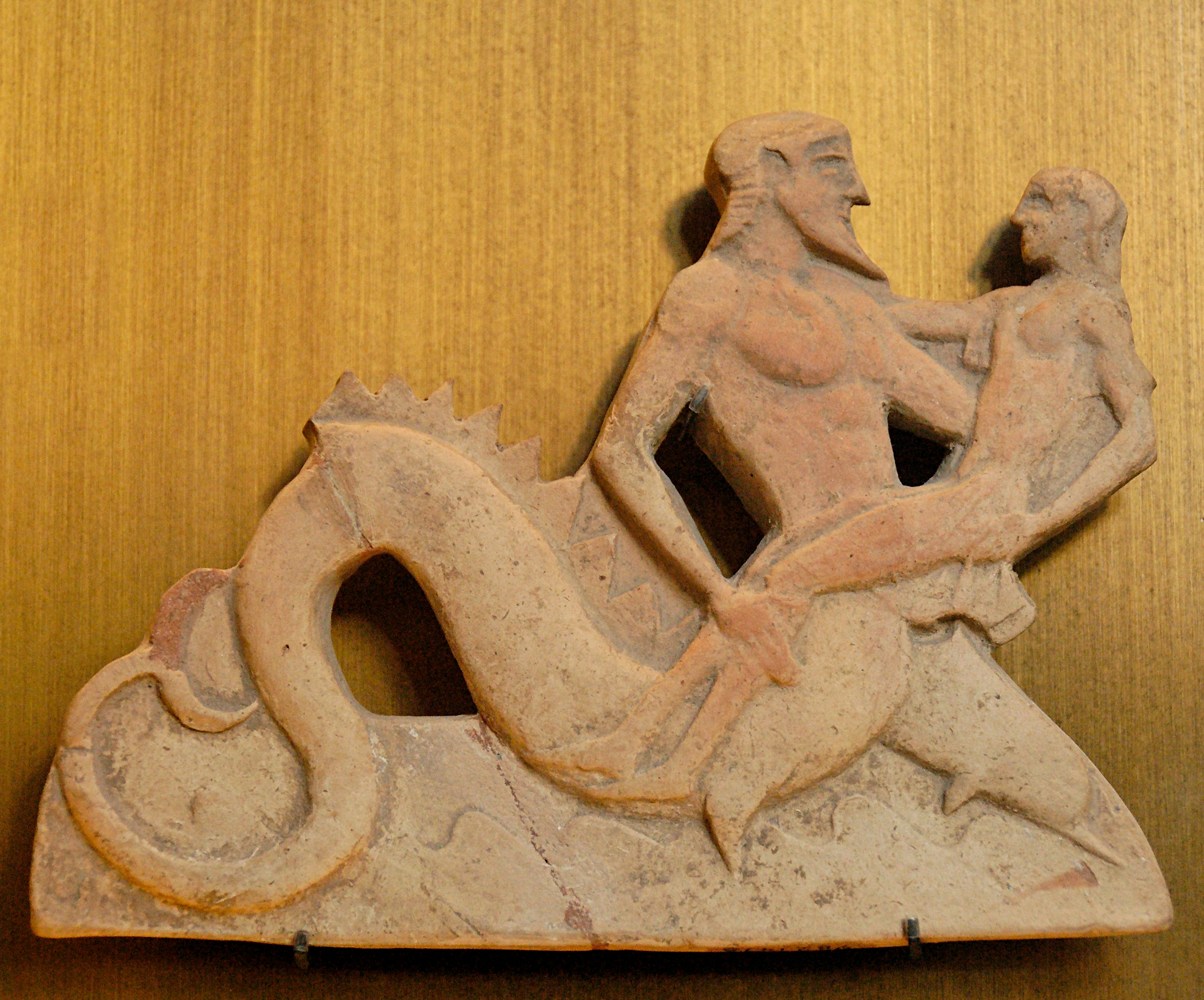
Melian terracotta relief depicting Triton and Theseus

From at least as early as 470 BC and ending with the siege of 416 BC, the Melians exported terracotta reliefs, which were typically used as door or chest ornaments and depicted scenes from mythology.

During the second Persian invasion of Greece in 480 BC, the Melians refused to submit to Persia and contributed two warships to the Greek war effort, which were used at the Battle of Salamis. After the battle, the Melians returned to their traditional isolationism.

=== Siege of 416 BC ===
During the Peloponnesian War (431–404 BC) between Athens and Sparta, the Melians made some small donations to the Spartan war effort, but remained largely neutral despite sharing the Spartans' Dorian ethnicity. In 426 BC, the Athenians raided the Melian countryside, and the following year demanded tribute, but Melos refused. In the summer of 416 BC, Athens invaded again with 3,400 men, and demanded that Melos ally with them against Sparta, or be destroyed. The Melians rejected this, so the Athenian army laid siege to the city and eventually captured it in the winter. After the city's fall, the Athenians executed all the adult men, and sold the women and children into slavery. They then settled 500 of their own colonists on the island.

In 405 BC, with Athens losing the war, the Spartan general Lysander expelled the Athenian settlers from Melos and repatriated the survivors of the siege. Sparta annexed Melos, which would mean that like other liberated islands, it received a military governor (a harmost). The cultural distinctiveness of Melos faded away as it was absorbed into mainstream Greek culture. Their coinage switched to the Rhodian standard (tetradrachms weighing 15.3 g) and ceased bearing the word ΜΑΛΙΟΝ. The production of its terracotta reliefs also ceased.

=== The Hellenistic period ===
In 338 BC, Philip II of Macedon defeated the Greeks at the Battle of Chaeroneia and became the overlord of Greece and the Cyclades. During this time, Melos and the nearby island Kimolos disputed each other over the ownership of the islands of Polyaigos, Heterea, and Libea (the last two are probably today's uninhabited islands of Agios Efstathios and Agios Georgios). In the past, this dispute would have been settled by war, but the two communities took their dispute to Argos on the Greek mainland. The Argives decided the islands belonged to Kimolos.

=== The Roman and Byzantine period ===
In 197 BC, the Romans forced Philip V to withdraw from Greece, and Melos subsequently came under Roman influence.

During the early 9th century CE the Cyclades were harassed by Arab raiders, though how Milos fared at this time is unclear. Milos was mentioned in a Byzantine chrysobull of 1198, which shows it was still important to the Byzantines.

=== Medieval period ===
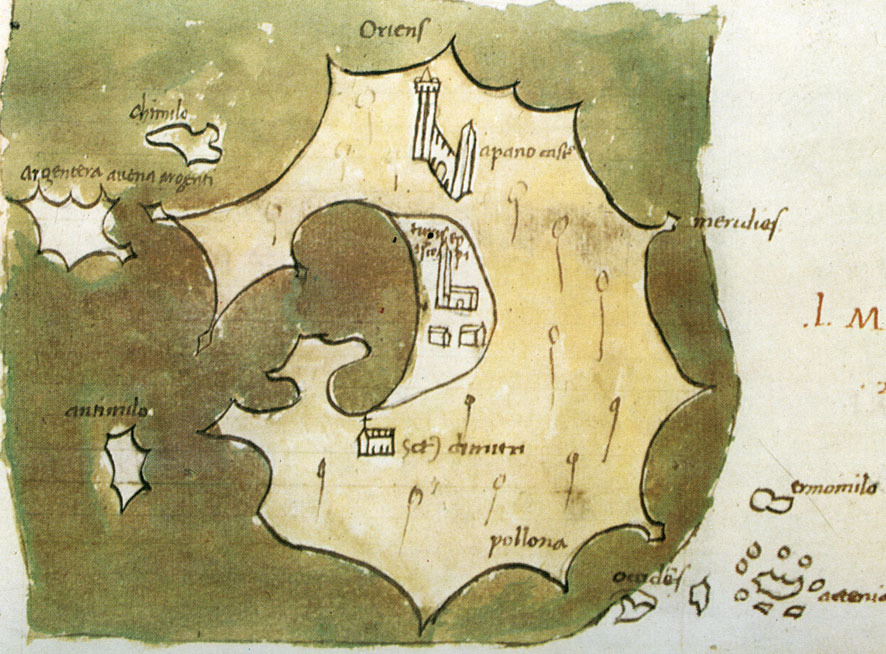
Fifteenth century map by Cristoforo Buondelmonti

In the aftermath of the Fourth Crusade (1204), the Venetian Marco Sanudo seized control of Milos and a number of other islands in the Cyclades. Sanudo declared himself the Duke of Naxos, after the island where he established his capital. Sanudo did not make his duchy a vassal of Venice, but instead declared loyalty to the Latin Emperor. Sanudo's dynasty lasted nine generations, then was succeeded by the Crispos. Both families were Catholic. The majority of the population was (and still is) Greek Orthodox.

Up to this point, the population of Melos was overwhelmingly Greek Orthodox Christian, just like the rest of the archipelago. When the Venetians conquered the archipelago, they brought Catholicism with them. The first Catholic bishop of Milos was appointed in 1253.

=== Ottoman period ===
In 1566 the Venetians handed over the Duchy of Naxos to the Ottoman Empire, and its last Catholic duke fled to Venice. The Ottoman sultan Selim II appointed a Portuguese Jew named Joseph Nasi as its duke. Upon Nasi's death in 1579, the Ottomans formally annexed the territory.

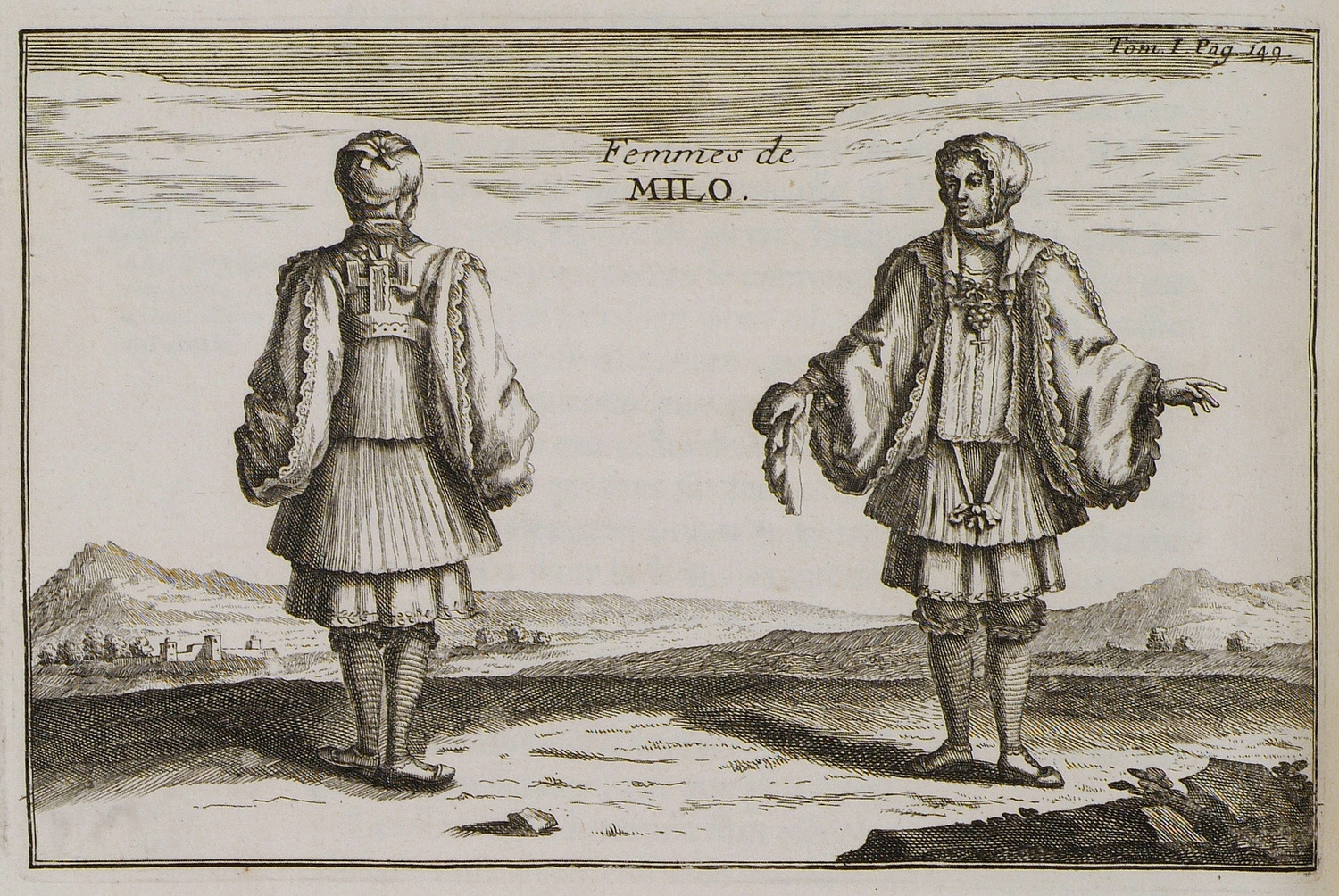
Women's dress in the early 18th century

In the early 18th century, the population surpassed 6,000 and was almost entirely Greek and Christian. It was ruled by a Turkish judge or kadi, and a Turkish governor or voivode. The voivode was responsible for collecting taxes and enforcing the decisions of the kadi. The day-to-day affairs of the island were managed by three elected magistrates (epitropi), although any of their decisions could be appealed to the kadi. The island had two bishops: one Greek Orthodox and one Latin Catholic. The Greek bishop was wealthier than his Latin counterpart, as he had a larger revenue base. Although the islanders enjoyed a great degree of autonomy, they chafed under the heavy taxation of their Ottoman overlords.

In 1771 the island was occupied by the Russian Empire for three years, then retaken by the Ottomans.

In the late 18th century, the population declined considerably for uncertain reasons. By 1798, it had fallen below 500 people. Visitors reported that up to two thirds of the buildings had fallen into ruin. It began growing again in the early 19th century, reaching 5,000 people by 1821. Reliable figures are hard to find as the Ottoman Empire never performed a census before 1881.

=== Modern period ===
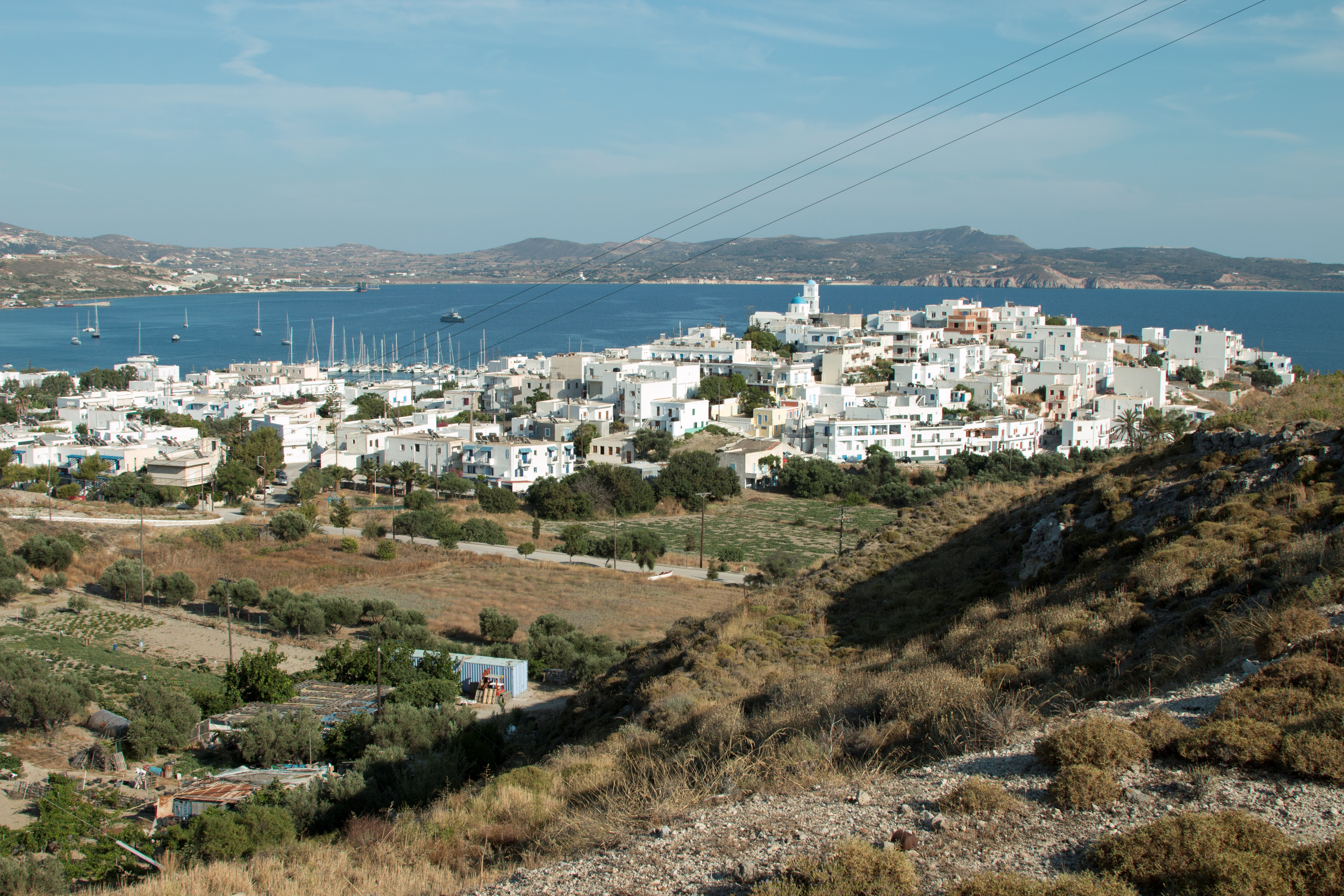
The port of Adamas

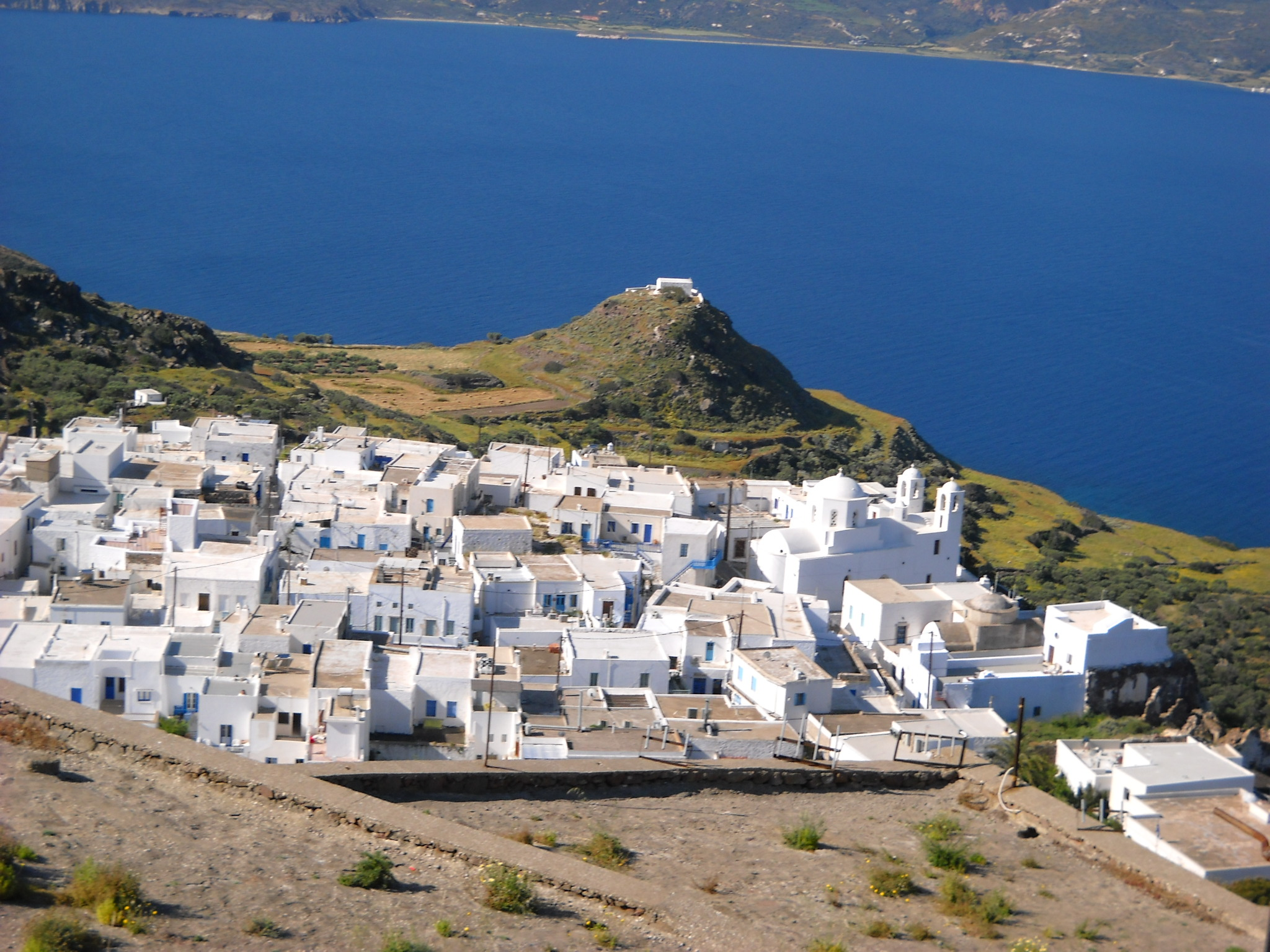
Chora (Plaka) of Milos

Milos was one of the first islands to join the Greek War of Independence of 1821. The first naval battle of the war took place off the coast of Milos on 11 April 1821. Milos became a refuge for refugees from numerous islands, particularly Crete. The port town of Adamantas was founded by Cretan refugees from the Cretan Revolt in 1841.

When Theodore Bent toured the island in December 1883, note-taking for his guide to the Cyclades, he found that "There is a lack of energy nowadays in Melos, for Syra monopolises all the trade that once came here, and the Cretan exiles refuse to cultivate as they ought the fertile centre of the island, for they are only awaiting a favourable turn in events to return to their own island…"

During the 19th century, Milos was a major rendezvous point for American and British ships fighting Muslim pirates in the Mediterranean.

In February 1943, 14 male civilians were executed for collecting material owned by the German occupation forces that was washed up after the sinking of a cargo ship by Allied aircraft.

The population peaked in 1928 at 6,562 people. In 2011 it was 4,977.

== Geography ==
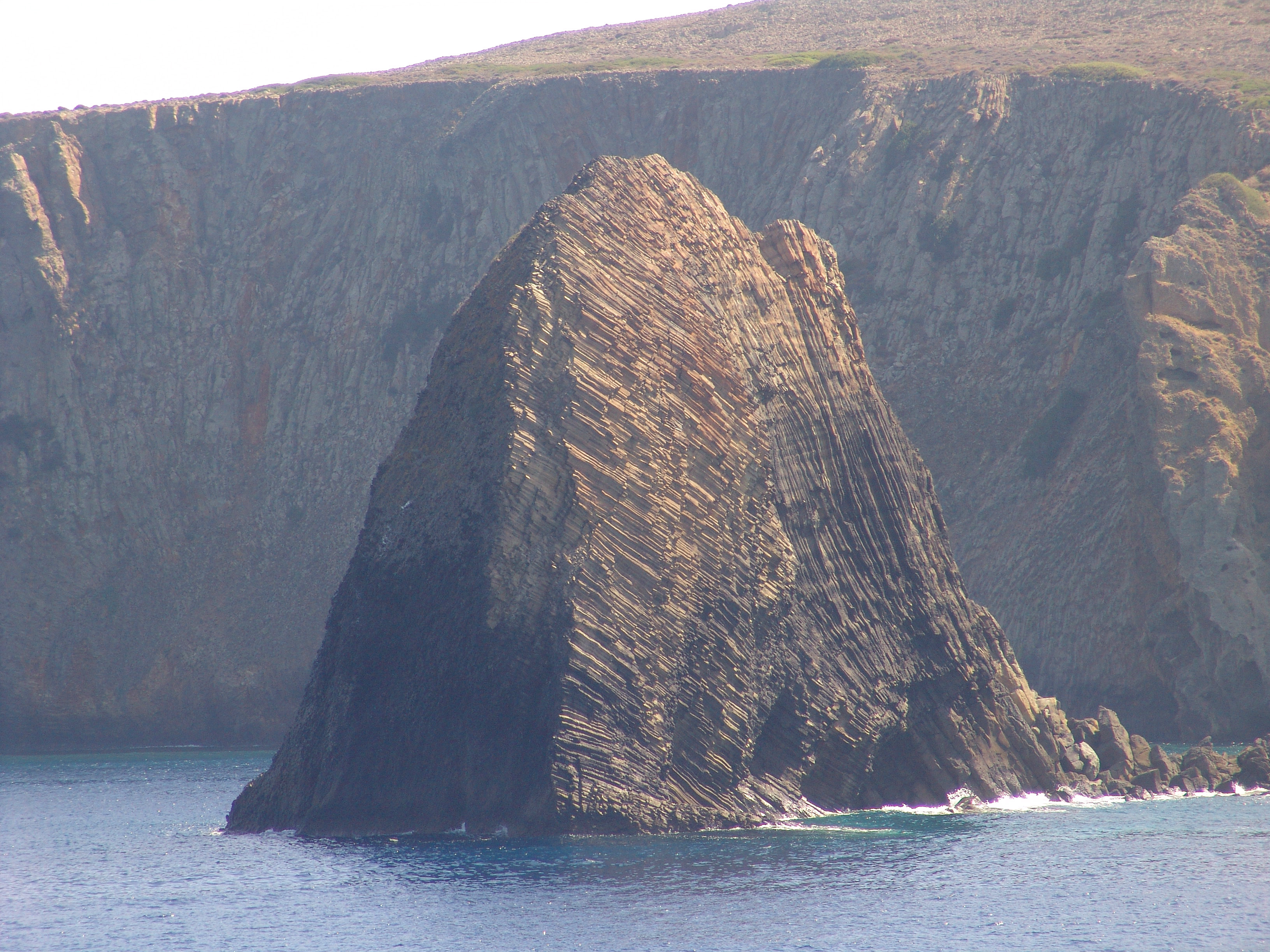
Columns of dacite lava at Glaronisia islet, north of Milos. The lava is of late Pliocene age.

Milos is the southwestern-most island in the Cyclades, 120 kilometres (75 miles) due east from the coast of Laconia. From east to west it measures about 23 km (14 mi), from north to south 13 km (8.1 mi), and its area is estimated at 151 square kilometres (58 sq mi). The greater portion is rugged and hilly, culminating in Mount Profitis Elias 748 metres (2,454 feet) in the west. Like the rest of the cluster, the island is of volcanic origin, with tuff, trachyte and obsidian among its ordinary rocks. Volcanic activity began 2 to 3 million years ago during the Pliocene, and last erupted 90,000 years ago during the Pleistocene, and is considered to still be a dormant volcano that could erupt again. Milos's volcanic landscape includes Sarakiniko, a coastal area known for its white rock formations shaped by wind and water erosion. The natural harbour is the hollow of the principal crater, which, with a depth diminishing from 70 to 30 fathoms (130–55 m), strikes in from the northwest so as to separate the island into two fairly equal portions (see photo), with an isthmus not more than 2.2 km (1.4 mi) broad. In one of the caves on the south coast, the heat from the volcano is still great, and on the eastern shore of the harbour, there are hot sulfurous springs.

Antimelos or Antimilos, 13 miles (21 km) north-west of Milos, is an uninhabited mass of trachyte, often called Erimomilos (Desert Milos). Kimolos, or Argentiera, 1.6 km (0.99 mi) to the north-east, was famous in antiquity for its figs and fuller's earth, and contained a considerable city, the remains of which cover the cliff of St. Andrew's. Polyaigos (also called Polinos, Polybos or Polivo — alternative spelling Polyaegos) lies 2 km (1 mi) south-east of Kimolos. It was the subject of dispute between the Milians and Kimolians. It is now uninhabited.

The harbour town is Adamantas; from this there is an ascent to the plateau above the harbour, on which are situated Plaka, the chief town, and Kastro, rising on a hill above it, and other villages. The ancient town of Milos was nearer to the entrance of the harbour than Adamas, and occupied the slope between the village of Trypiti and the landing-place at Klima. Here is a theatre of Roman date and some remains of town walls and other buildings, one with a fine mosaic excavated by the British school at Athens in 1896. Numerous fine works of art have been found on this site, notably the Aphrodite in Paris, the Asclepius in London, and the Poseidon and the archaic Apollo in Athens. Other villages include Triovasalos, Peran Triovasalos, Pollonia and Zefyria (Kampos).

=== Climate ===
Milos has a Mediterranean climate (Köppen climate classification: Csa) with mild, rainy winters and warm to hot dry summers.

Climate data for Milos
Month	Jan	Feb	Mar	Apr	May	Jun	Jul	Aug	Sep	Oct	Nov	Dec	Year
Record high °C (°F)	21.6 (70.9)	26.2 (79.2)	25.6 (78.1)	28.4 (83.1)	35.4 (95.7)	44.0 (111.2)	41.0 (105.8)	39.8 (103.6)	36.3 (97.3)	32.0 (89.6)	27.8 (82.0)	23.4 (74.1)	44.0 (111.2)
Mean daily maximum °C (°F)	12.9 (55.2)	13.2 (55.8)	14.8 (58.6)	18.4 (65.1)	22.8 (73.0)	27.1 (80.8)	28.1 (82.6)	27.6 (81.7)	25.2 (77.4)	21.3 (70.3)	18.0 (64.4)	14.6 (58.3)	20.3 (68.5)
Daily mean °C (°F)	10.5 (50.9)	10.7 (51.3)	12.1 (53.8)	15.2 (59.4)	19.3 (66.7)	23.5 (74.3)	25.0 (77.0)	24.6 (76.3)	22.3 (72.1)	18.5 (65.3)	15.3 (59.5)	12.3 (54.1)	17.4 (63.3)
Mean daily minimum °C (°F)	8.5 (47.3)	8.5 (47.3)	9.6 (49.3)	12.4 (54.3)	15.9 (60.6)	19.8 (67.6)	21.8 (71.2)	21.6 (70.9)	19.6 (67.3)	16.1 (61.0)	13.1 (55.6)	10.3 (50.5)	14.8 (58.6)
Record low °C (°F)	−2.0 (28.4)	−2.0 (28.4)	0.0 (32.0)	5.4 (41.7)	8.0 (46.4)	10.0 (50.0)	14.0 (57.2)	14.2 (57.6)	11.6 (52.9)	8.0 (46.4)	2.8 (37.0)	0.0 (32.0)	−2.0 (28.4)
Average precipitation mm (inches)	74.7 (2.94)	50.6 (1.99)	47.2 (1.86)	20.5 (0.81)	13.1 (0.52)	3.3 (0.13)	0.3 (0.01)	1.4 (0.06)	5.8 (0.23)	42.9 (1.69)	60.7 (2.39)	90.3 (3.56)	410.8 (16.17)
Average precipitation days (≥ 1.0 mm)	8.8	7.3	5.7	2.9	1.4	0.3	0.1	0.1	0.9	3.9	5.8	9.0	46.2
Average relative humidity (%)	73.3	72.5	72.0	67.0	63.5	58.8	60.1	63.4	66.8	71.3	73.9	73.7	68.0
Source: NOAA

== Natural resources ==
=== Volcanic minerals ===
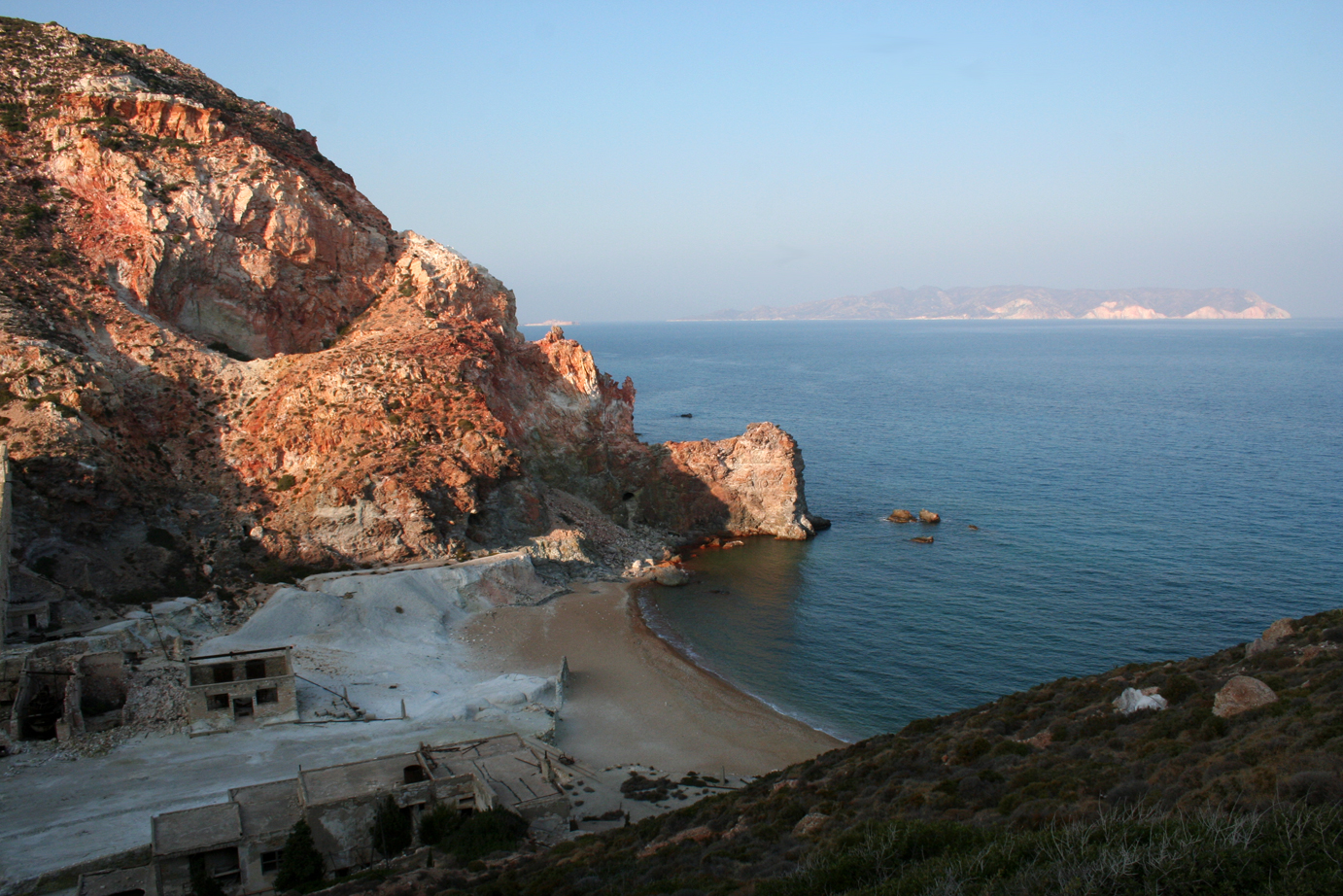
View of an old sulfur mine at Thiorichia beach.

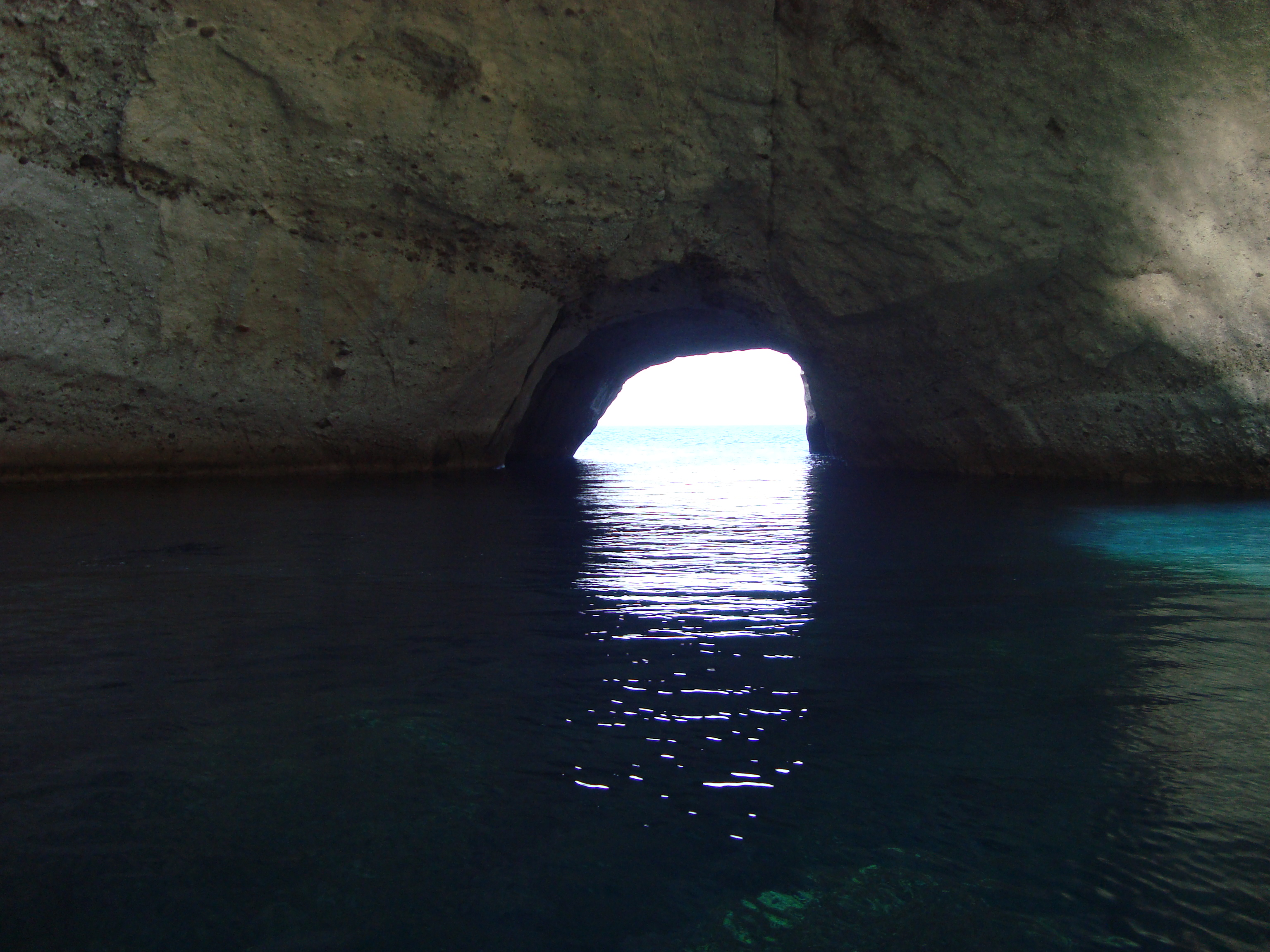
The Cave of Sikia from interior.

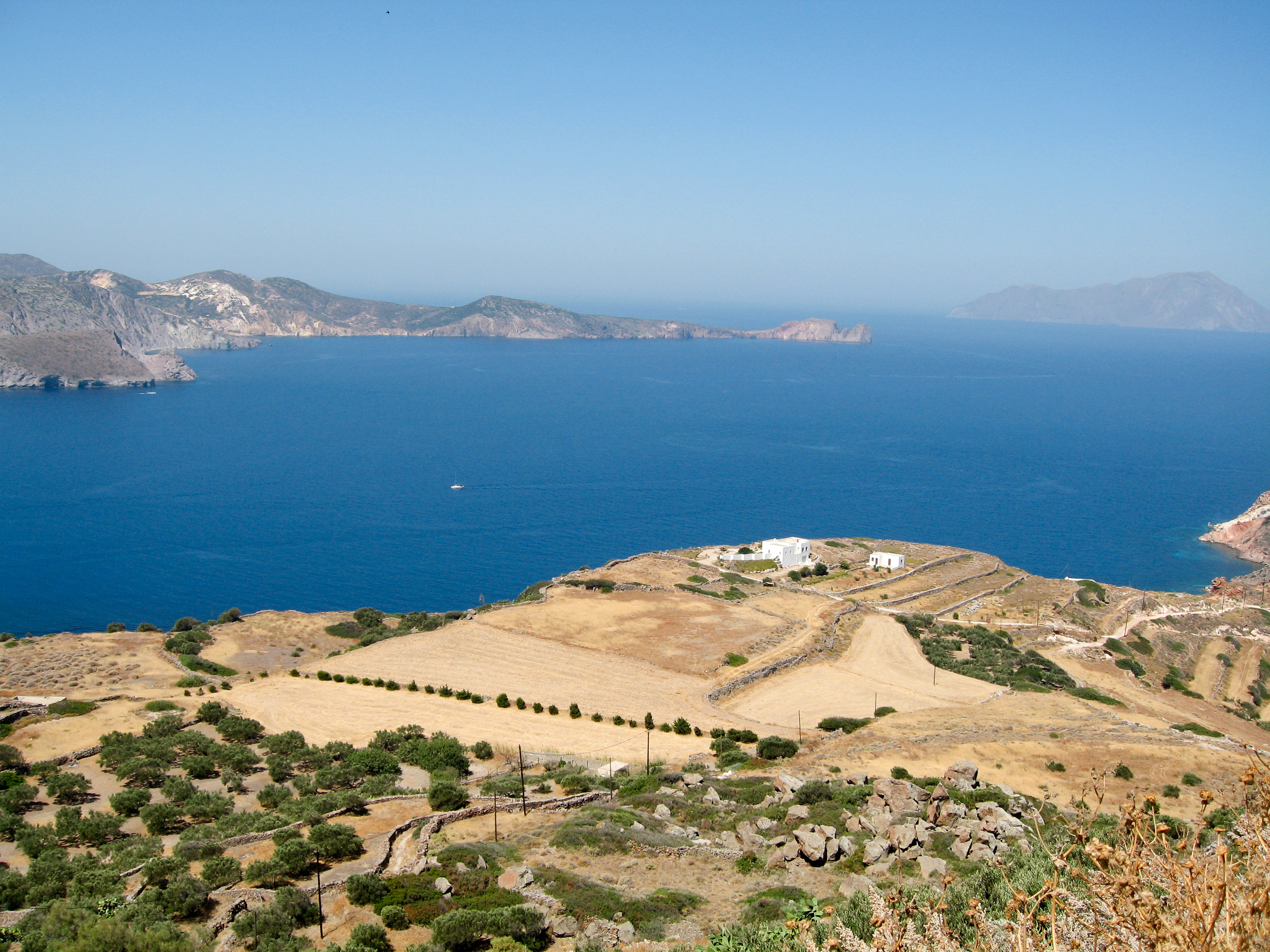
The bay of Milos

Bentonite, perlite, pozzolana and small quantities of kaolin are actively collected via strip mine or open-pit mine techniques in Milos and sold all over the world. In the past, baryte, sulfur, millstones and gypsum were also mined; Pliny the Elder notes that Milos was the most abundant source of sulfur in the ancient world. In ancient times the alum of Milos was reckoned next to that of Egypt (Pliny xxxv. 15 [52]). The Melian earth was employed as a pigment by ancient artists. Milos was a source of obsidian during the Neolithic ages for the Aegean and Mediterranean.

=== Agricultural crops ===
Orange, olive, cypress, tamarisk, juniper (Juniperus oxycedrus) and arbutus trees grow throughout the island, which, however, is too dry to have any profusion of vegetation. Grapes, cotton, and barley are the main crops.

=== Medicinal plants ===
Almost all of the uninhabited western region of Milos is a Natura 2000 site and is home to over 800 different taxa, including 35 which are endemic to Greece. In an ethnobotanical survey of Milos, numerous native and cultivated species were described as being used to treat a variety of conditions and for other purposes such as insect repellents, disinfectants, and to protect against the evil eye. The most frequently reported species was Greek sage. Local historical records of medicinal plant use date back to the 16th century.

== Sister island ==
- Shōdoshima, Kagawa, Japan (1989)

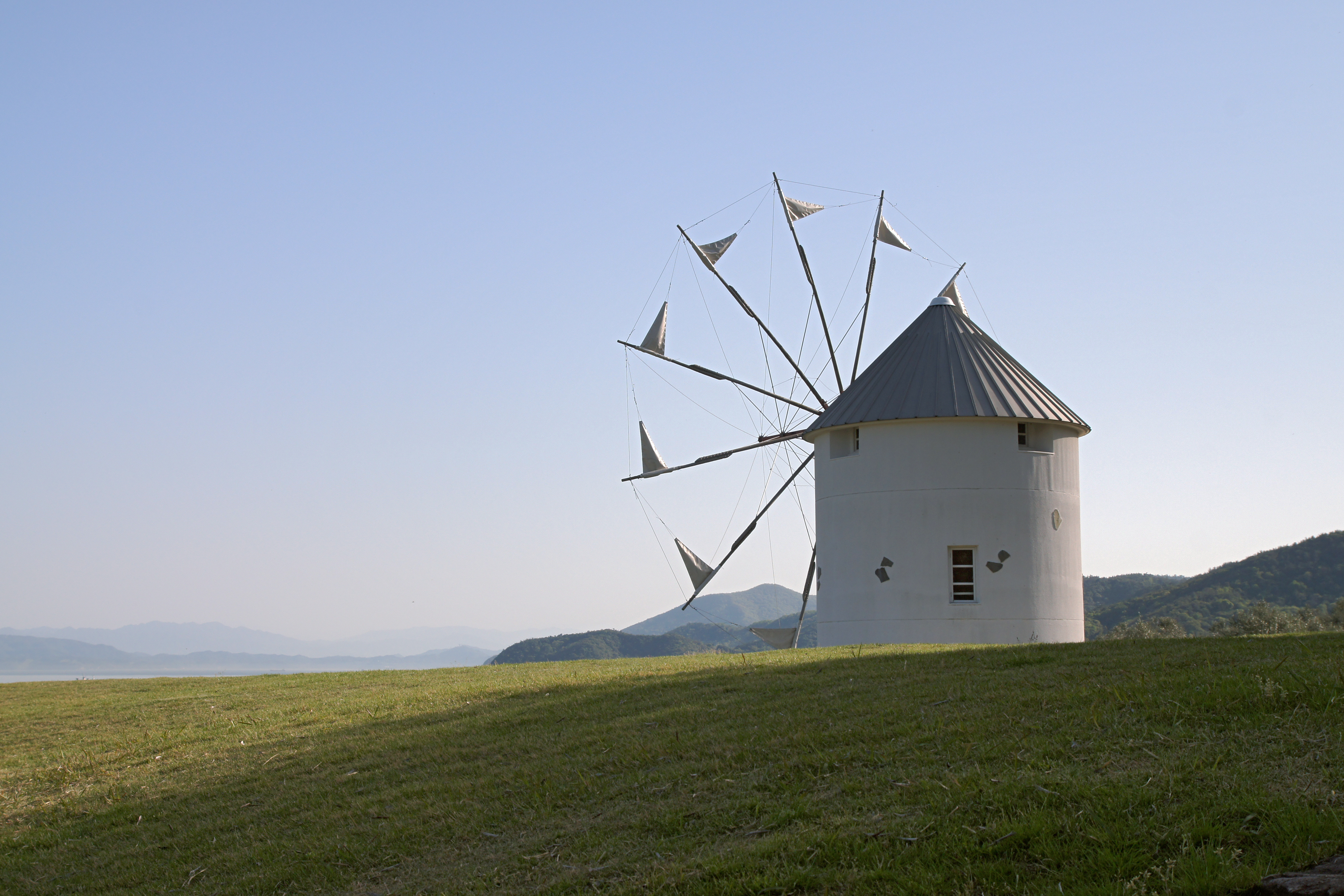
The windmill in Shodoshima Olive Park was presented to Shōdo Island by the Greek island of Milos.

== Demographics ==
=== Historical population ===
Year	Island population
1798	500
1812	2,300
1821	5,000
1907	5,393
1928	6,562
1991	4,380
2001	4,771
2011	4,978

== Modern popularity, tourism ==
Although it receives fewer visitors than some other islands in the Cyclades, Milos has become an increasingly popular tourist destination in recent decades. Visitors are drawn by its traditional Greek architecture, its varied coastline and beaches and a less crowded setting than the more visited islands of Santorini and Mykonos.

In 2016, the music video for "This Girl" was filmed on Milos. It tells the story of two teenagers who meet on a ferry and spend carefree summer days on Milos, flirting, dancing, and swimming. The backdrop is Sarakiniko, an exotic landscape of snow-white cliffs, turquoise waters, and bizarre rock formations. The success of the music video (571 million views on YouTube as of October 2026) turned Milos into a world-famous visual icon.

== Popular culture ==
- The 2007 film To Fili Tis Zois was shot in Milos and specifically in Plaka and the port of Adamas. The name of the island is also referred to during the movie.
- A Canadian Commercial Greek Oikos Yogurt Mermaid was shot at Fyriplaka Beach in Milos.
- The ending scenes of the 2025 science fiction comedy Bugonia were shot in Sarakiniko Beach in Milos.

== People ==
- Antonio Millo (active 1557–1590), captain and cartographer
- Antonio Vassilacchi (1556–1629), painter
- Diagoras (5th century BC), philosopher
- Melanippides (5th century BC), poet

== See also ==
- Aegean Islands
- Antimilos
- Arkoudes
- Catacombs of Milos
- Firiplaka
- Kimolos
- List of Aegean Islands
- Milos Island National Airport (MLO)
- Sarakiniko Beach

== Sources ==
- I.F. Stone, 1988, The trial of Socrates, Anthos.
- Cambridge Ancient History, Vol.II, 1924, New York, MacMillan
- Colin Renfrew and Malcolm Wagstaff (editors), 1982, An Island Polity, the Archaeology of Exploitation in Melos, Cambridge, Cambridge University Press.
- Colin Renfrew (editor), 1985, The Archaeology of Cult, the Sanctuary at Phylakopi, London, British School at Athens and Thames & Hudson.
- Leycester, "The Volcanic Group of Milo, Anti-Milo, &c.," in Jour. Roy. Geog. Soc. (1852).
- Tournefort, Voyage.
- William Martin Leake, Northern Greece, iii.
- Anton von Prokesch-Osten, Denkwürdigkeiten, &c.
- Bursian, Geog. von Griechenland, ii.; Journ. Hell. Stud, xvi, xvii, xviii, Excavations at Phylakopi; Inscr. grace, xii. iii. 197 sqq.;
- on coins found in 1909, see Jameson in Rev. Num. 1909; 188 sqq.
- "Mílos". Global Volcanism Program. Smithsonian Institution.
- Seaman, Michael G., "The Athenian Expedition to Melos in 416 B.C.," Historia 46 (1997) pp. 385–418.
- Hill, G. F. (1899). A Handbook of Greek and Roman Coins. Macmillan and Co., Limited.
- Loomis, William T. (1992). The Spartan War Fund: IG V 1, 1 and a New Fragment. Franz Steiner Verlag. ISBN 978-3-515-06147-6.
- Renfrew, Colin; Wagstaff, Malcolm, eds. (1982). An Island Polity: The Archaeology of Exploitation in Melos. Cambridge University Press. ISBN 0-521-23785-8.
- Thucydides (c. 400 BC). History of the Peloponnesian War. Translated by Richard Crawley (1914).
- Tournefort, Joseph Pitton de (1717). Relation d'un Voyage du Levant [An Account of a Voyage into the Levant] (in French).
- Thompson, Charles (1752). The Travels of the Late Charles Thompson, Esq. Vol. 1. Reading, Newberry.
- Turner, William (1820). Journal of a Tour in the Levant, Vol. 1. John Murray, Albemarle-Street.
- Olivier, Guillaume Antoine (1801). Travels in the Ottoman Empire, Egypt, and Persia. Paris H. Agasse.
- Gardner, Percy (1918). A History of Ancient Coinage. Oxford at the Clarendon Press.
- Low, P. (2008). Athenian Empire. Edinburgh Readings on the Ancient World. Edinburgh University Press. ISBN 978-0-7486-3124-7.
