= Zefyria, Milos =

Village in Milos, Greece

Zefyria Ζεφυρία
- Settlement
- Location within Greece
- Coordinates: 36°42′3″N 24°29′26″E
- Country: Greece
- Administrative region: South Aegean
- Regional unit: Milos
- Municipality: Milos
- Community: Trypiti

Population (2021)
  - Total: 190
- Time zone: UTC+2 (EET)
  - Summer (DST): UTC+3 (EEST)

Zefyria is a village in the inner part of the island of Milos. It had been the chief-town of the island before this title was moved to Plaka. It belongs to the community of Trypiti of the municipality of Milos. Its population according to the 2021 census was 190 inhabitants. It is a mostly agricultural settlement.
