= Sarakiniko Beach =

Beach on Milos, Greece

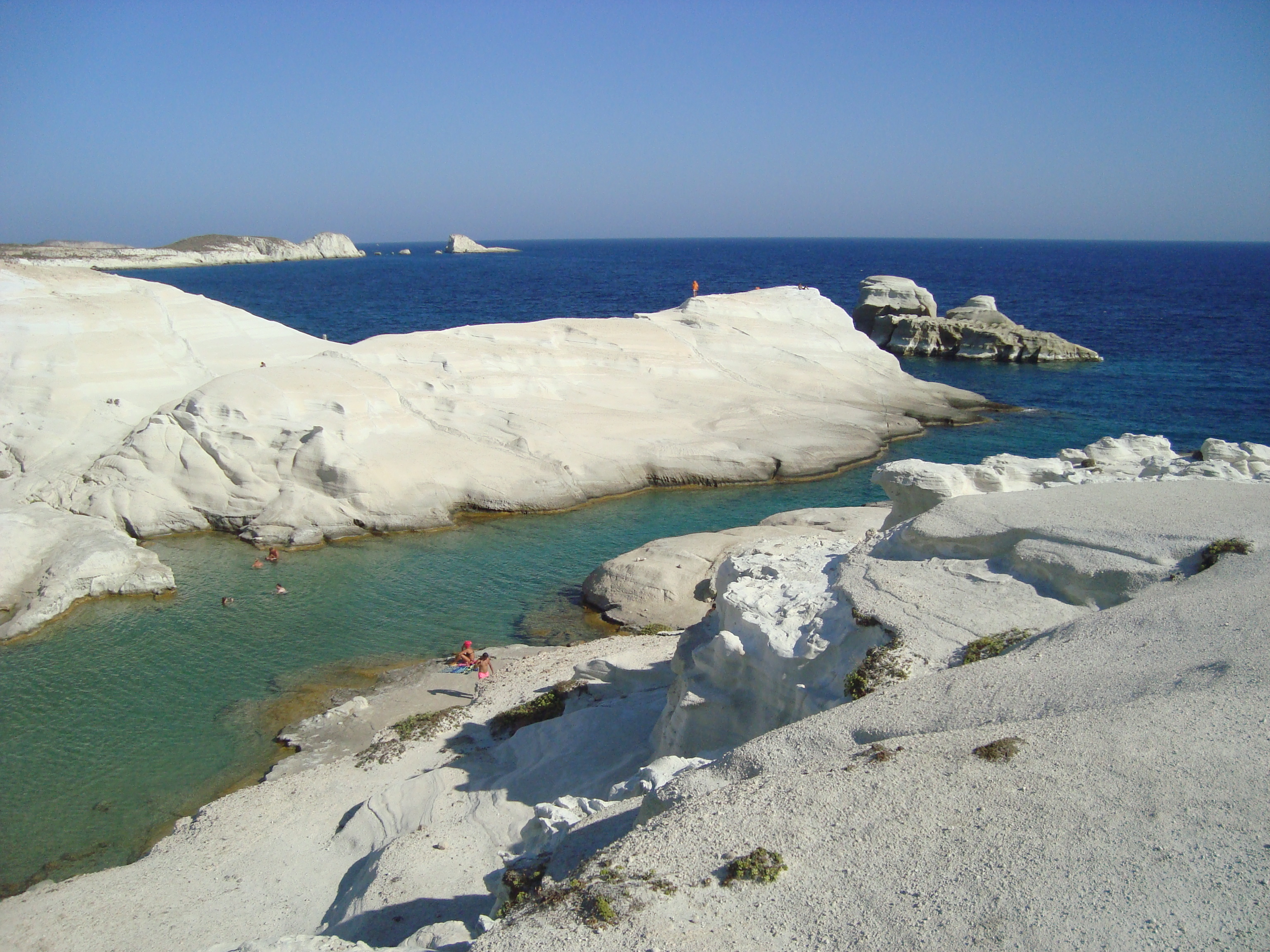
Sarakiniko

Sarakiniko (Greek: Σαρακήνικο) is a beach on Milos Island, Greece, situated on the north shore of the island in the Aegean Sea. Waves driven by north winds shape the greyish-white volcanic rock into amazing shapes, and the area is often compared to a moonscape. The local people often refer to the scenic landscape of Sarakiniko as Lunar. The bone-white beach derives its unusual characteristics from the erosion of the volcanic rock by the wind and waves. Sarakiniko is one of the most photographed landscapes in the Aegean.

== Sarakiniko beach ==
The beach at Sarakiniko only covers a small portion of the whole site. The beach is niched in between the white rock formations. It is made of thin white sand. A couple of trees provide small areas of shade in the back of the beach.

== Sarakiniko desert ==
While the west side of Sarakiniko provides a lunar like landscape, the east side of Sarakiniko is a desert. With dry plants and rocky grounds, this side of Sarakiniko is also home to a wrecked ship which visitors can see when the waves retrieve. The ship called "Africa" crashed on Sarakiniko in 2003.

== Gallery ==
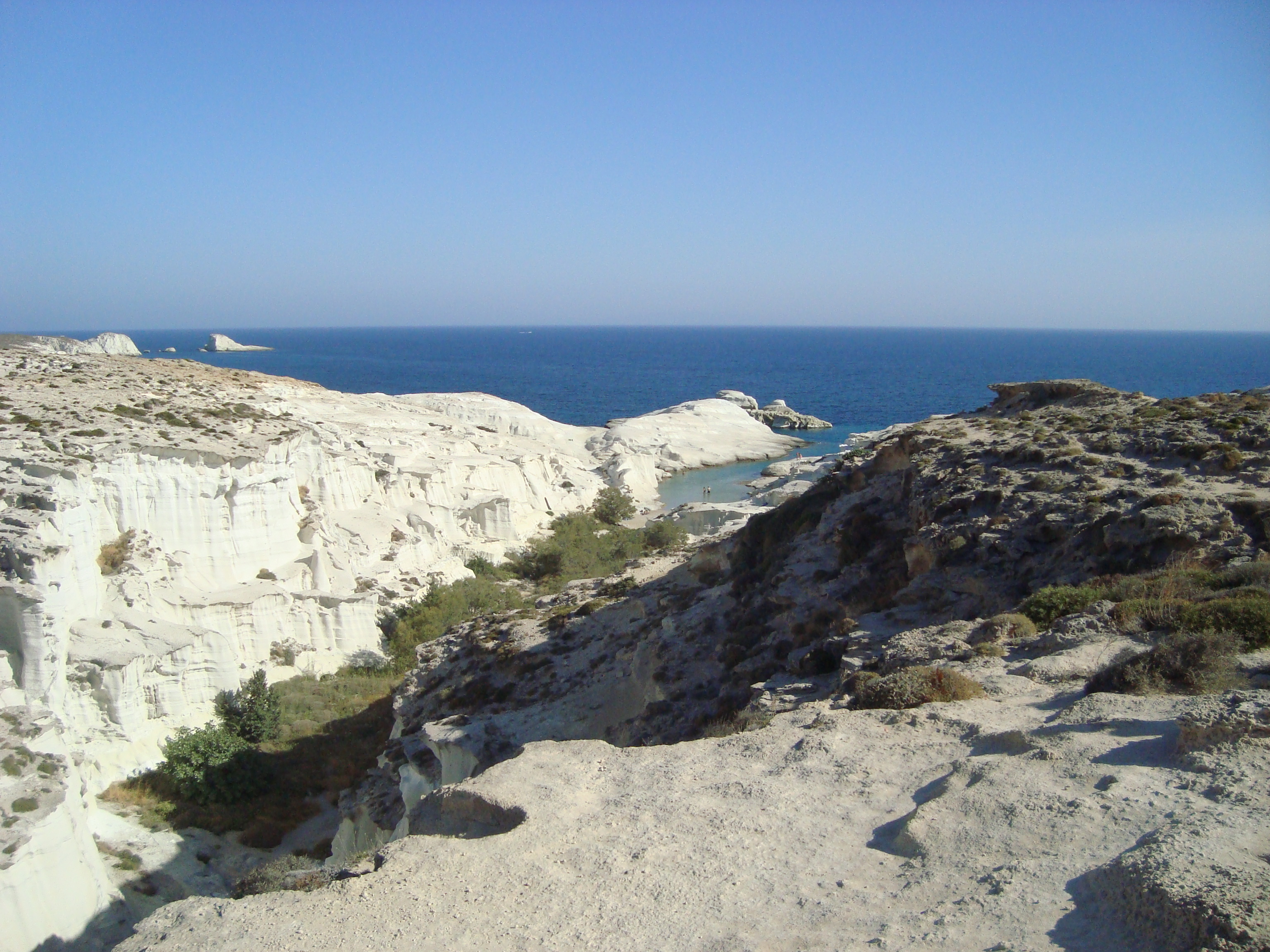
The View of Sarakiniko

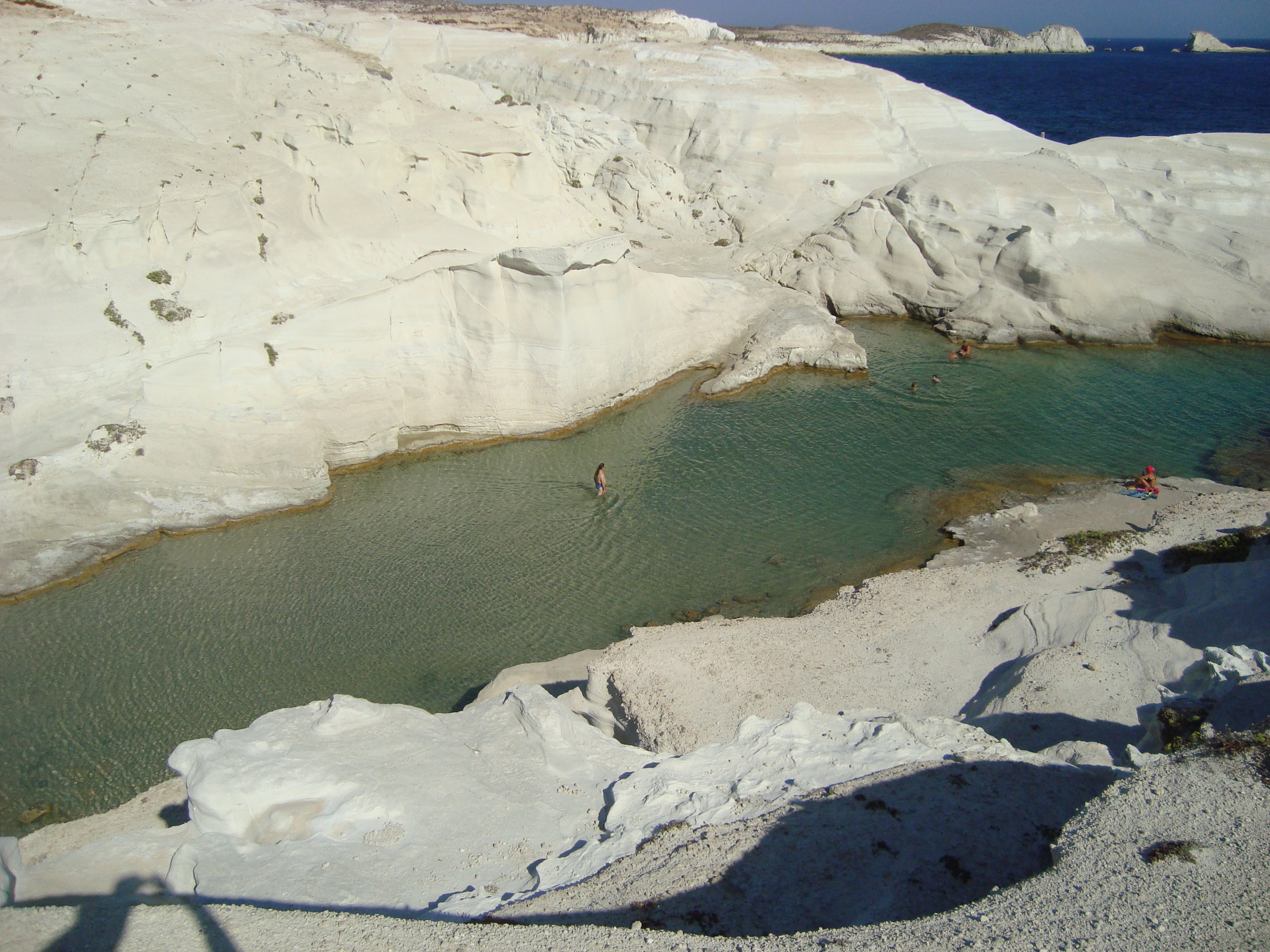
The White Beach of Sarakiniko

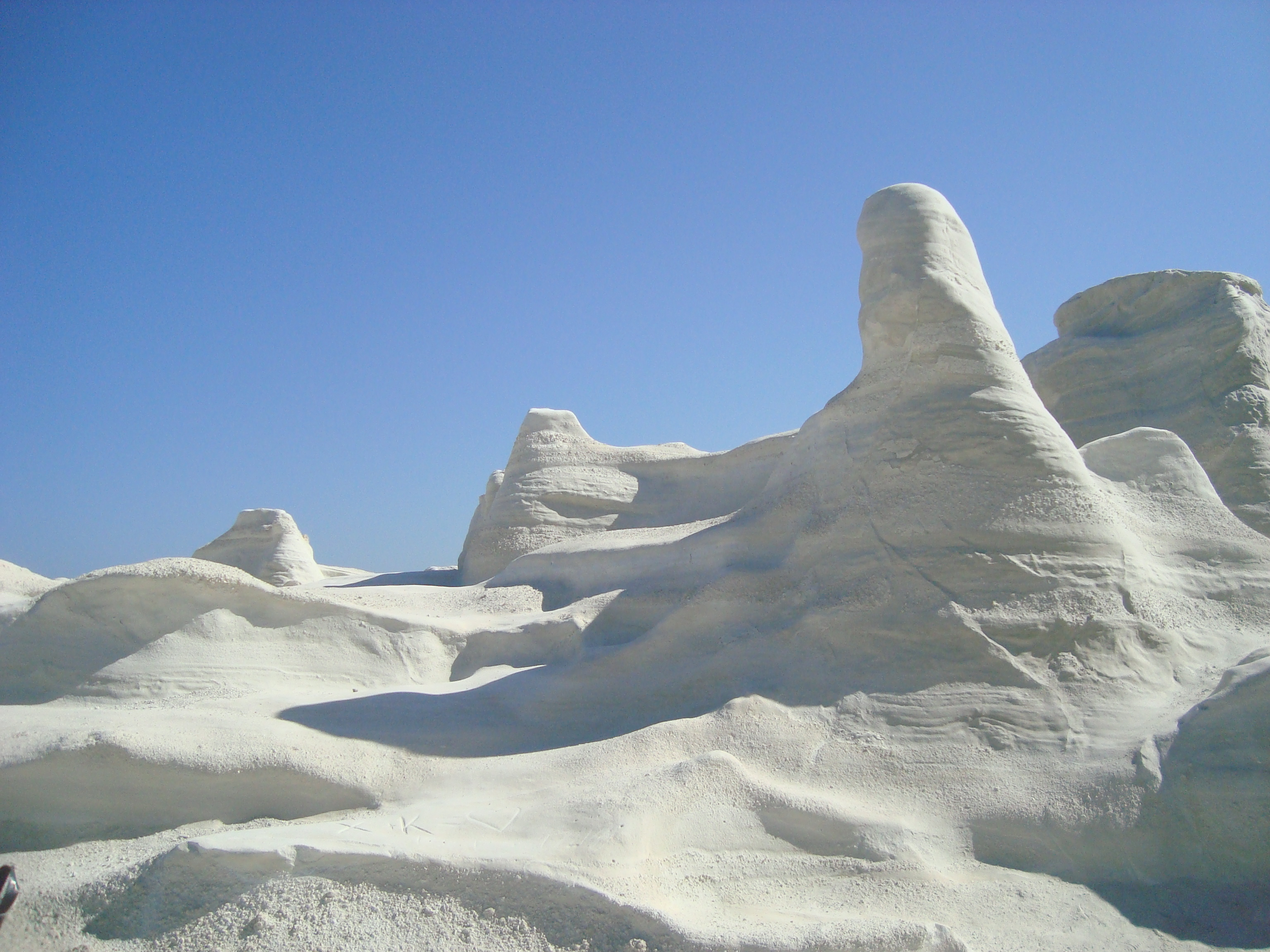
Nature Shaping

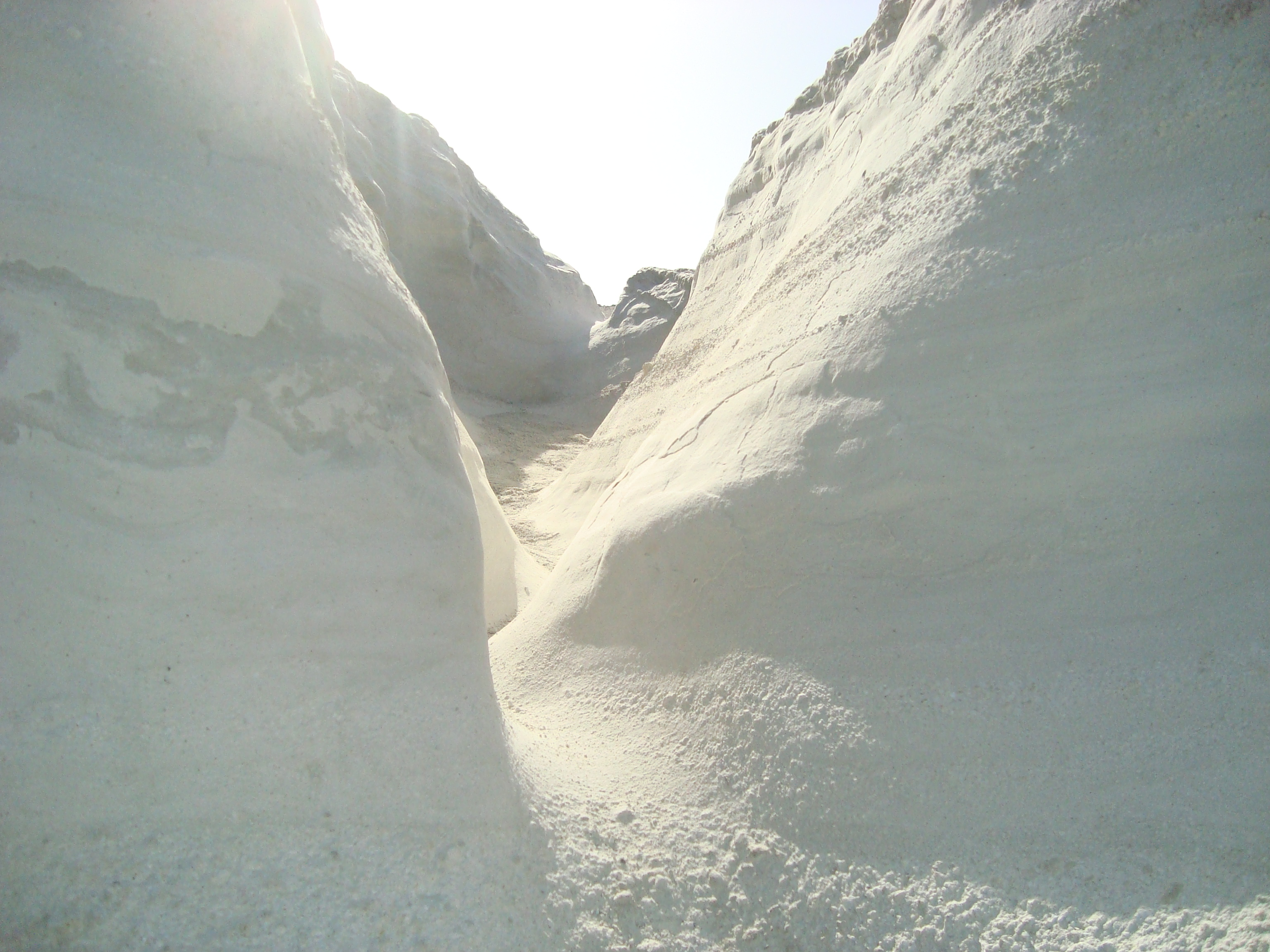
White Rocks 1

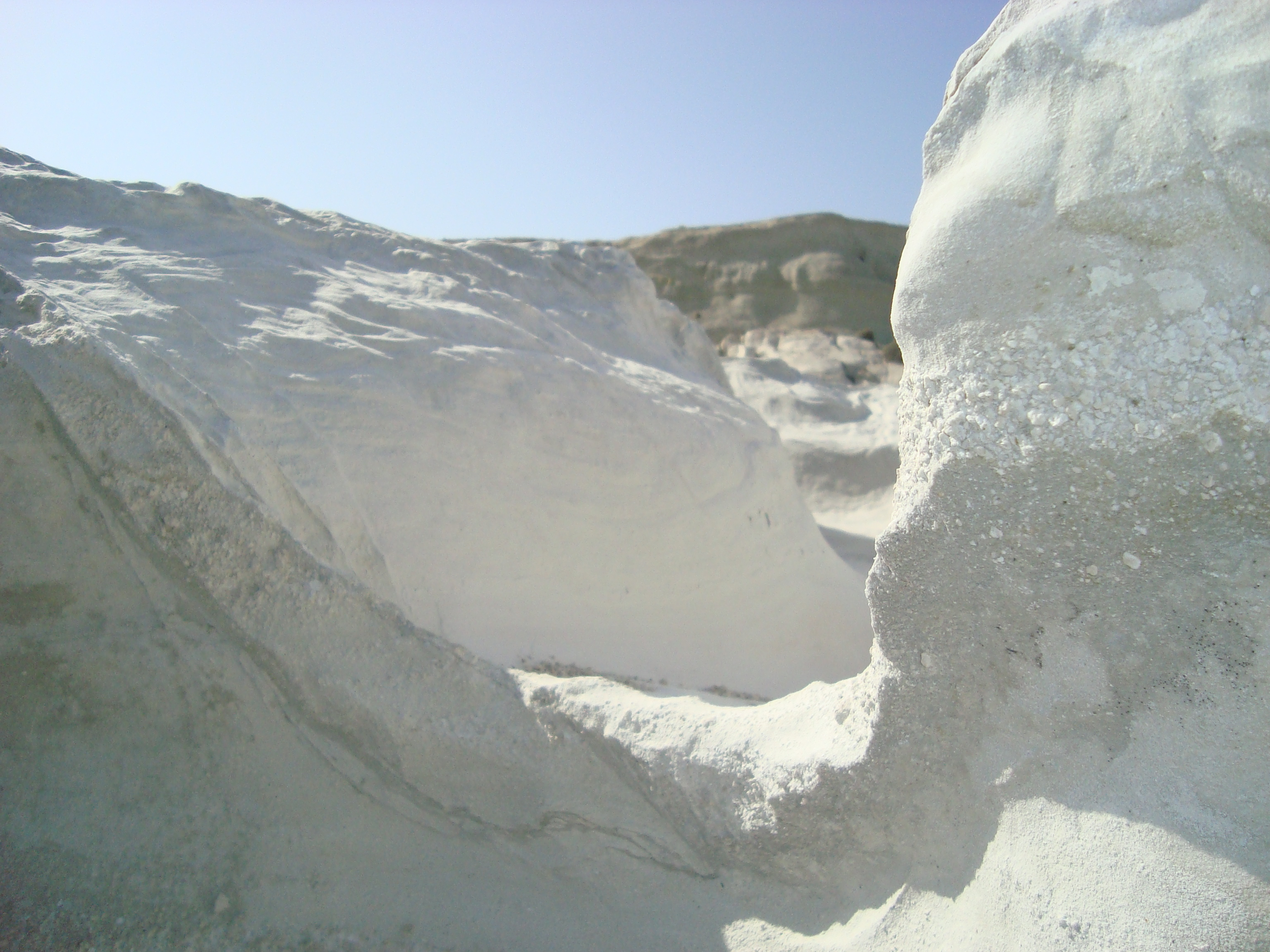
White Rocks 2

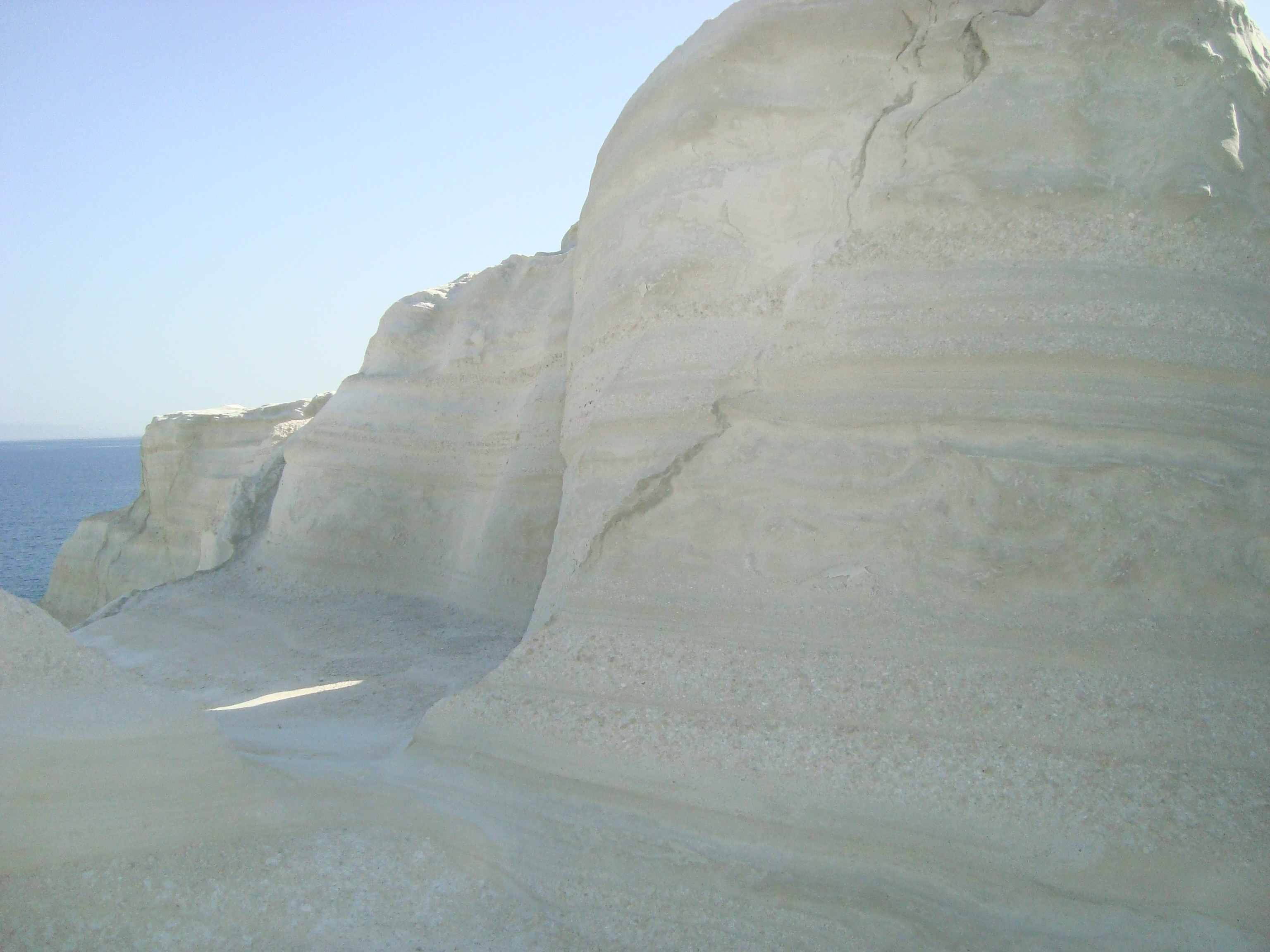
White Rocks 3

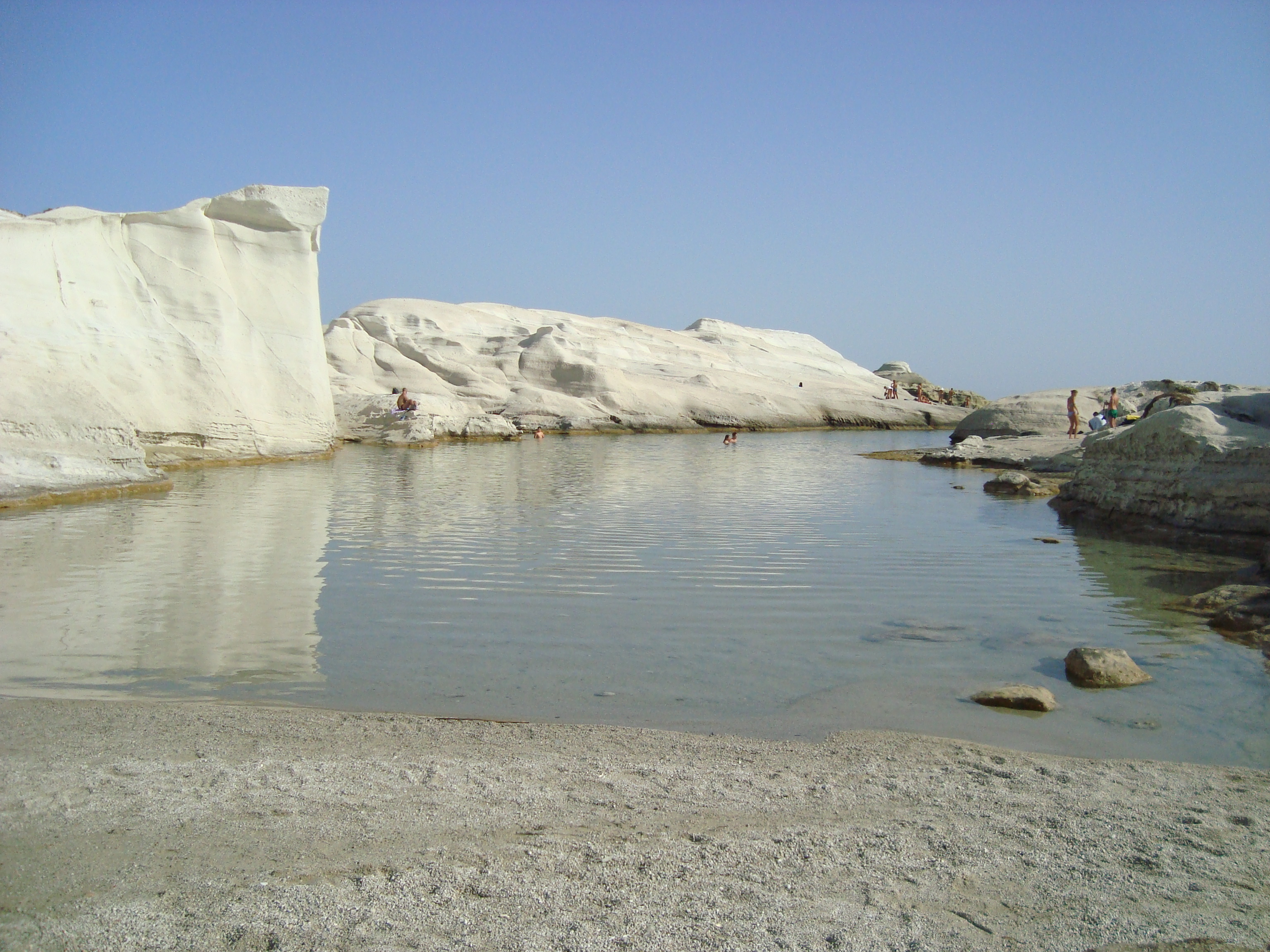
The Beach 1

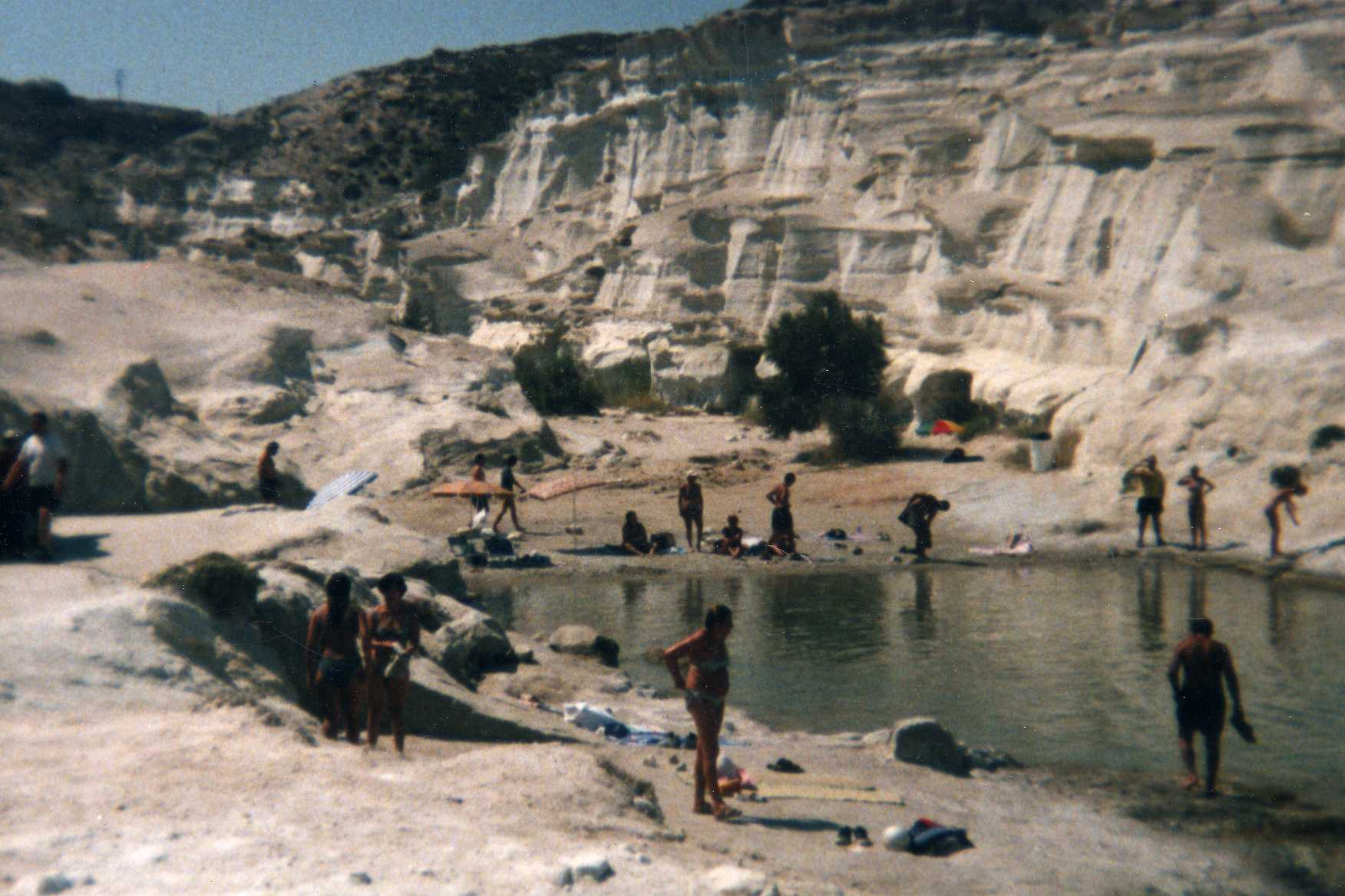
The Beach 2

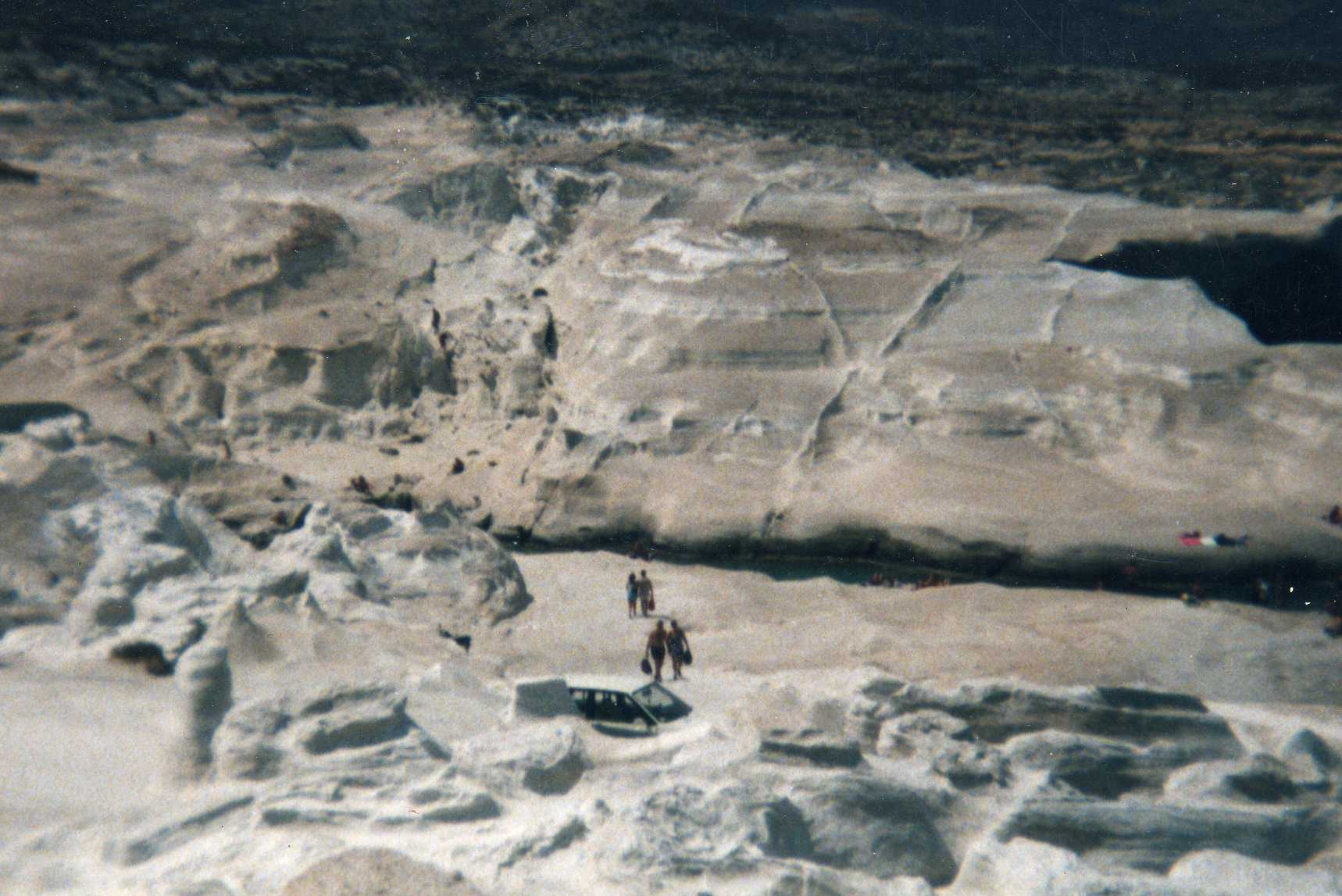
Sarakiniko in shapes

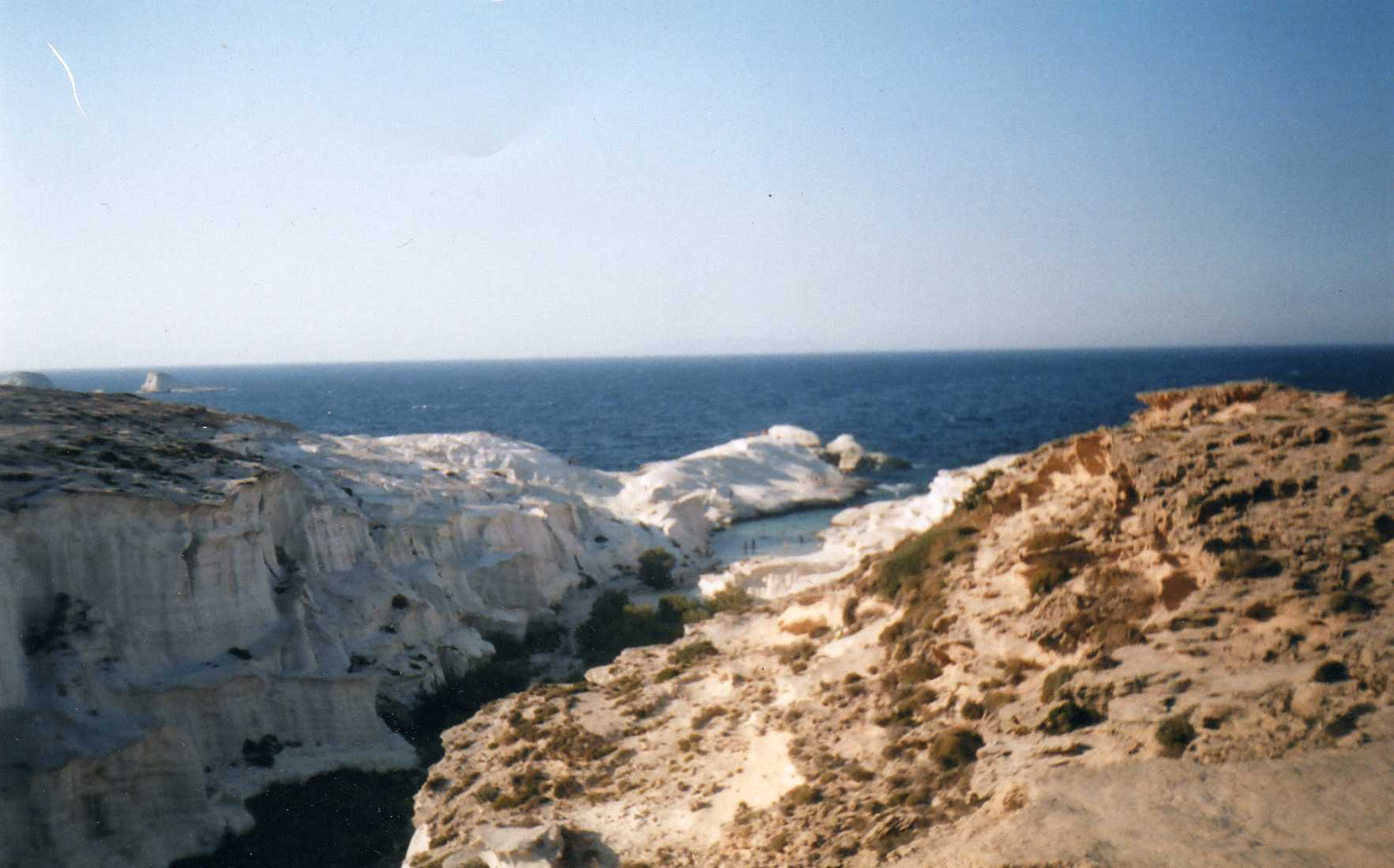
Sarakiniko view

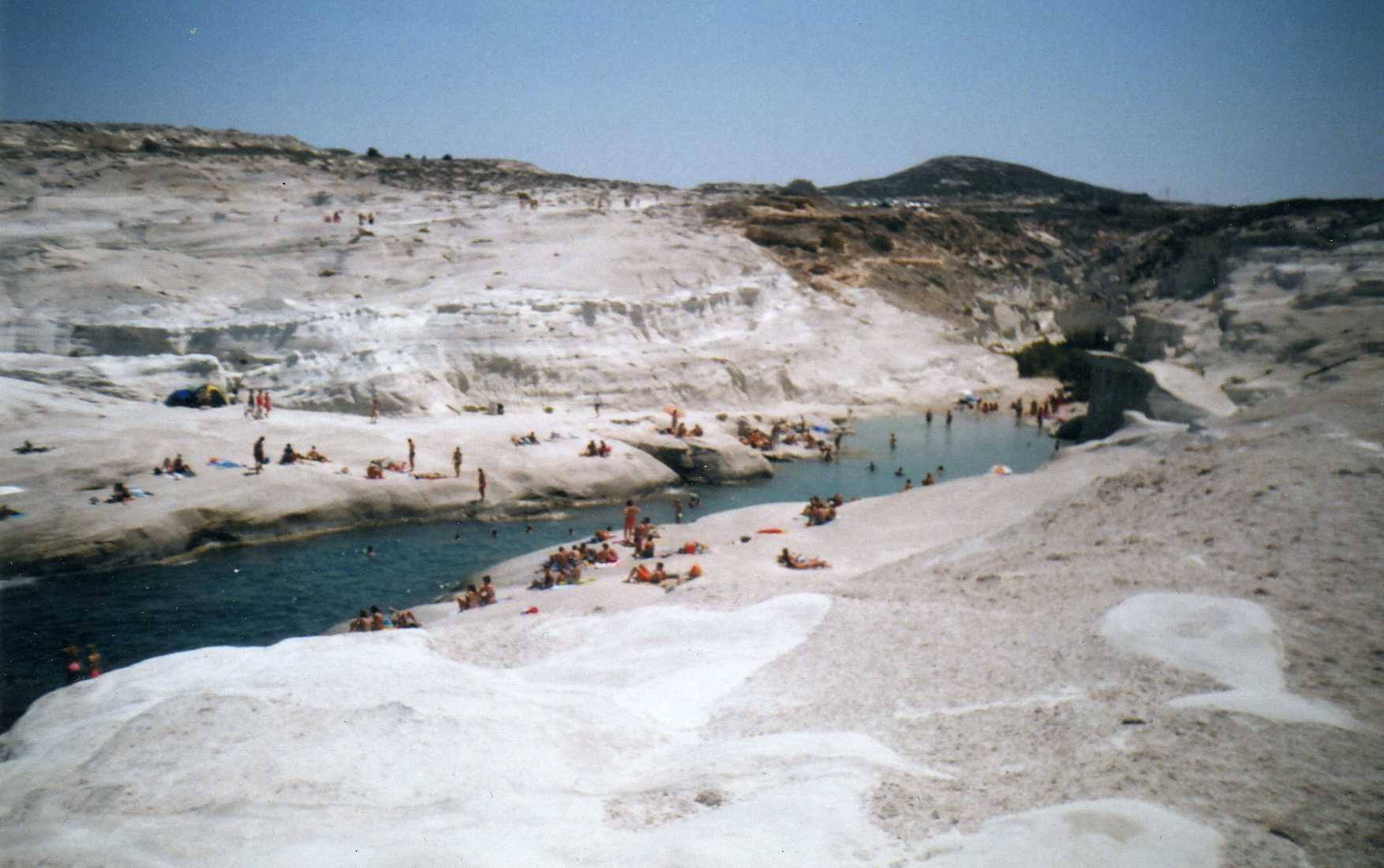
central Sarakiniko

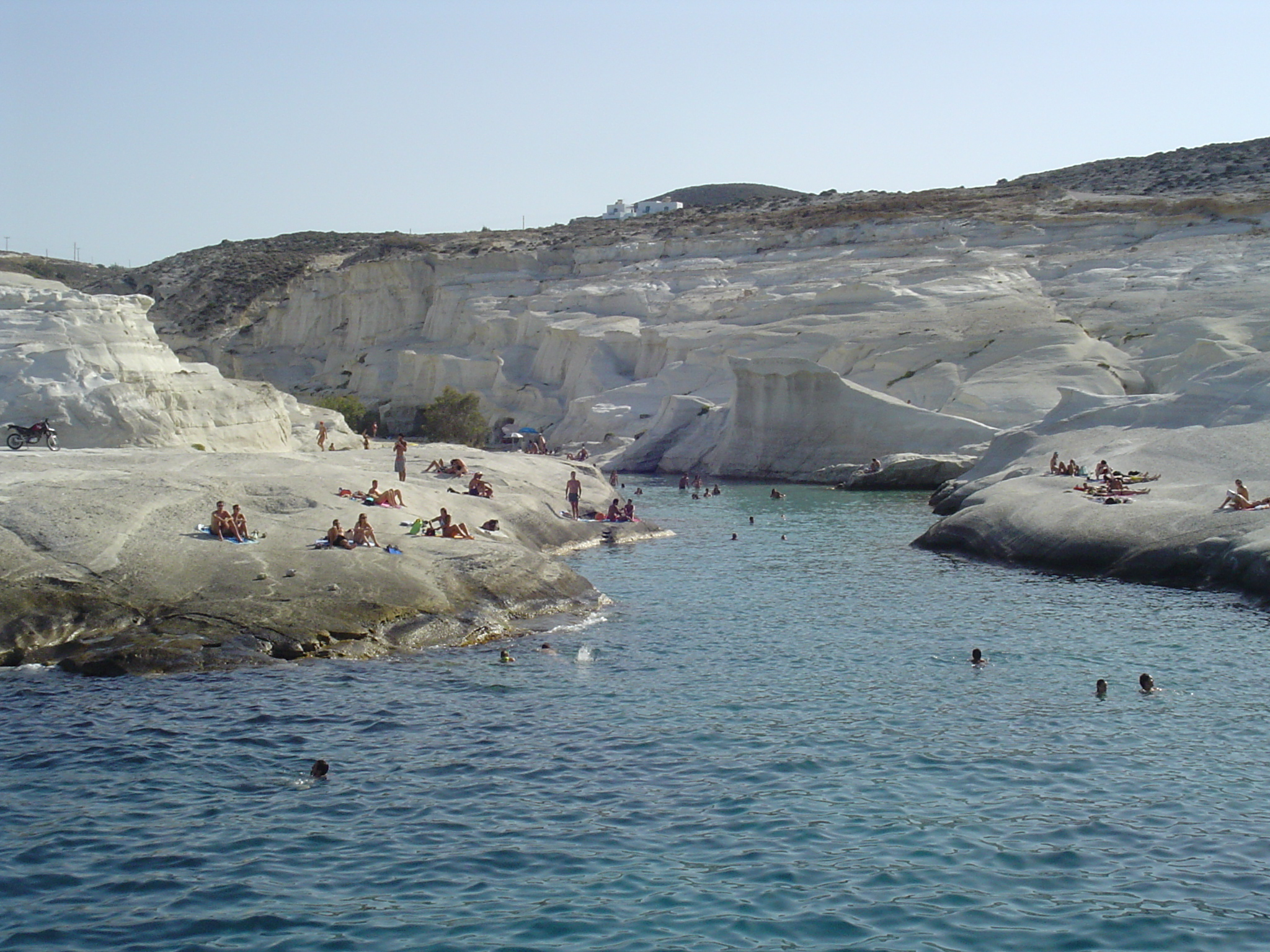
Bathers at Sarakiniko beach

== Popular Culture ==
Scenes of the 2025 dark comedy film Bugonia by Yorgos Lanthimos were shot in Sarakiniko Beach.

== See also ==
- Antimilos
- Kimolos
- Santorini
