= Klíma =

Klíma (feminine: Klímová) is a Czech surname. It originated as a pet name of the given names Klement and Kliment, but there is also a theory that some bearers of the surname got it from the verb klímat, which used to mean 'to hesitate', 'to laze around'. An Anglicized and Germanised form of the surname is Klima. Notable people with the surname include:

- Arnošt Klíma (1916–2000), Czech historian
- Daniel Klíma (born 2002), Czech speedway rider
- Ivan Klíma (1931–2025), Czech novelist and playwright
- Jakub Klíma (born 1998), Czech footballer
- Jiří Klíma (born 1997), Czech footballer
- Josef Klíma (1911–2007), Czech basketball player
- Ladislav Klíma (1878–1928), Czech philosopher and novelist
- Linda Klímová (born 1988), Czech curler
- Ludvík Klíma (1912–1973), Czech sprint canoeist
- Lukáš Klíma (curler) (born 1991), Czech curler
- Lukáš Klíma (ice hockey) (born 1990), Slovak ice hockey player
- Matěj Klíma (born 1999), Czech handball player
- Petr Klíma (1964–2023), Czech ice hockey player
- Rita Klímová (1931–1993), Czech economist and politician
- Tomáš Klíma (born 1990), Slovak ice hockey player
- Vilém Klíma (1906–1985), Czech electrical engineer
- Vlastimil Klíma (born 1957), Czech cryptographer
