= In the Penal Colony =

- Short story by Franz Kafka
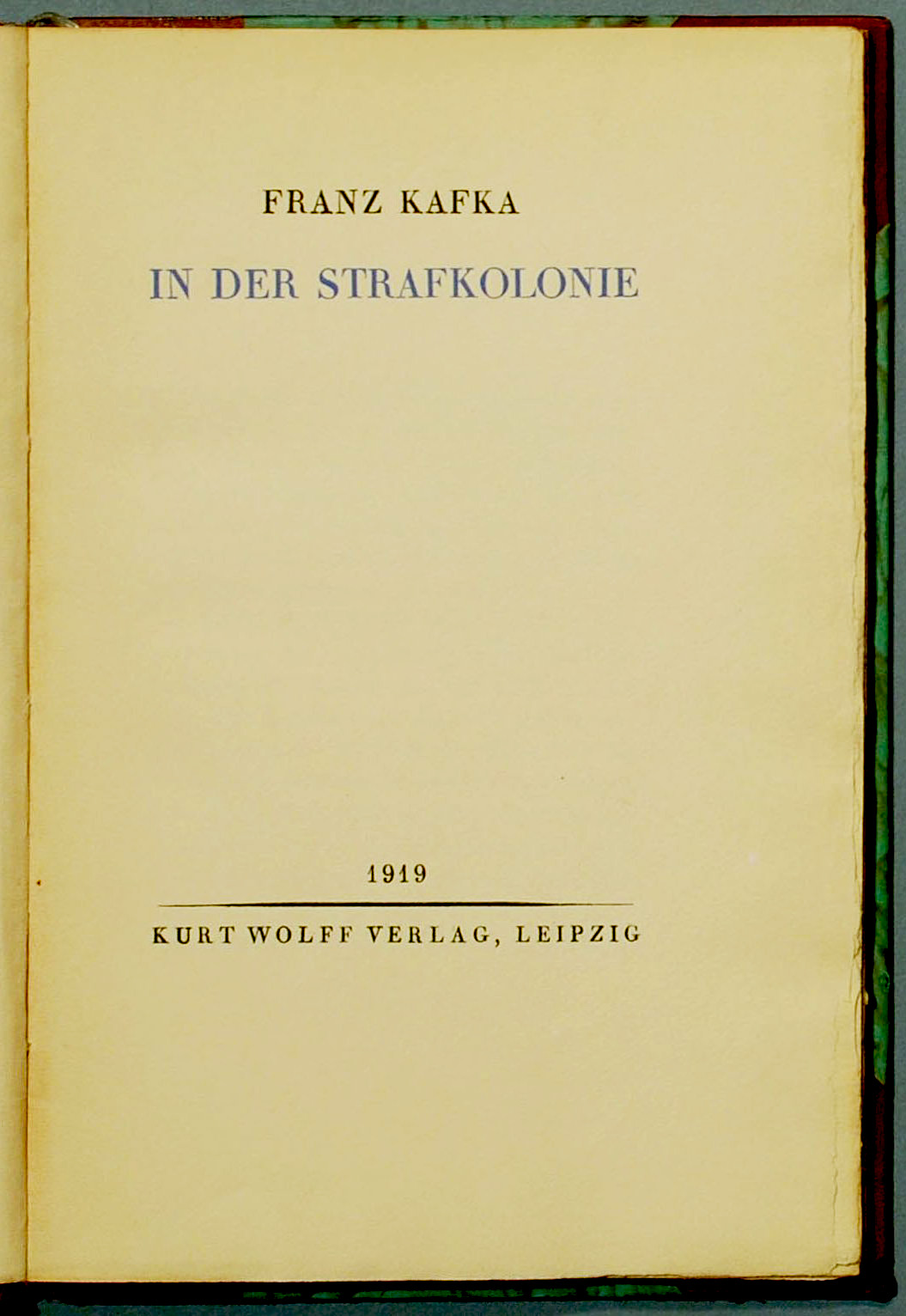
- In the Penal Colony
- Original title: In der Strafkolonie
- Translator: Eugene Jolas (1941)
- Country: Weimar Germany
- Language: German
- Genre: Short story

Publication
- Publisher: Kurt Wolff Verlag
- Media type: book (hardcover)
- Publication date: October 1919
- Published in English: 1941

"In the Penal Colony" ("In der Strafkolonie"; also translated as "In the Penal Settlement") is a short story by Franz Kafka written in German in October 1914, revised in November 1918, and first published in October 1919.

The story is set in an unnamed penal colony and describes the last use of an elaborate torture and execution device that carves the name of the offense that the condemned prisoner committed on his skin as he slowly dies over the course of twelve hours. As the plot unfolds, the reader learns more and more about the machine, including its origin and original justification.

== Plot outline ==
=== Characters ===
There are only four characters, each named according to his role in the story. The Condemned is a man scheduled for execution, the Soldier is responsible for guarding him, the Officer is in charge of the machine that will execute the Condemned, and the Traveller is a European dignitary and visitor.

=== Synopsis ===
The story focuses on the Traveller, who has just arrived in an island penal colony and is encountering its brutal execution machine for the first time. Everything about the functioning of the intricate machine and its purpose and history is told to him by the Officer. The Soldier and the Condemned, who is unaware that he has been sentenced to die for failing to get up and salute outside his captain's door each hour during his night watch, and for resisting when the captain whipped him across the face, placidly watch from nearby.

Under the judicial process associated with the machine, the accused is always assumed to be guilty and is not given a chance to defend himself. As punishment, the law the man has broken is inscribed progressively deeper on his body over a period of 12 hours as he slowly dies from his wounds. During their final six hours in the machine, the accused supposedly experiences a religious epiphany. The machine was designed by the colony's previous Commandant, of whom the Officer is a devoted supporter. He carries its blueprints with him and is the only person who can decipher them, not allowing anyone else to handle them.

Eventually, it becomes clear that the machine has fallen out of favor since the death of the previous Commandant and the appointment of a successor. The Officer is nostalgic regarding the torture device and the values that were initially associated with it, recalling the crowds that used to attend each execution. Now, he is the last outspoken proponent of the machine, but he strongly believes in its form of justice and the infallibility of the previous Commandant.

The Officer begs the Traveller to speak to the current Commandant on behalf of the machine's continued use. The Traveler refuses to do so; he says he will not speak against the machine publicly and will instead give his opinion to the Commandant privately and then leave before he can be called to give an official account. Crestfallen that the Traveller has not been persuaded by his explanations and entreaty, the Officer frees the Condemned and sets up the machine for himself, with the words "Be Just" to be written on him. However, the machine malfunctions because of its advanced state of disrepair; instead of its usual elegant operation, it quickly stabs the Officer to death, denying him the mystical experience of the prisoners he had executed.

Accompanied by the Soldier and the Condemned, the Traveller makes his way to a tea house, in which he is shown the grave of the previous Commandant, who was not allowed to be buried in the cemetery. The gravestone, which is set so low that a table can easily be placed over it, bears an inscription stating the belief of his nameless followers that he will rise from the dead someday and retake control of the colony. The Traveller immediately goes to the harbour and finds someone to take him out to the steamer on which he is travelling. He repels the efforts of the Soldier and Condemned to follow him.

== Reception ==
Kurt Tucholsky reviewed the story in 1920 and found it "masterly" in how it "seemingly suppresses all inner feeling with such conscious energy and yet is thoroughly marked by the stamp of the author." He also wrote that it leaves a "faint taste of blood" in the reader's mouth.

== Style and themes ==
As in some of Kafka's other writings, the narrator in this story seems detached from, or perhaps numbed by, events that one would normally expect to be registered with horror. Internal clues and the setting on an island suggest Octave Mirbeau's The Torture Garden as an influence.

Kurt Tucholsky considered and rejected several "interpretations" including an allegory, a critique of military law systems, and a story about unlimited power. Mark Harman believes the story resists interpretation yet raises "ever pertinent questions" about punishment and justice, the relation of power and violence, colonialism, the lure of atavistic cults, and the troubles of well-intended interventions.

Scholar Beth Benedix wrote that the story is eerily prophetic of the graphic violence of the Holocaust and totalitarianism. Similarly Didier Pollefeyt wrote that the story is a prophetic announcement of the twentieth century’s moral catastrophes.

=== Religious readings ===
If all parallels with the Bible are considered, the reading can be "an unorthodox ... vision of traditional theology". The old way of running the colony is reminiscent of the views presented in the Old Testament, with the old Commandant – creator of the torture machine, as well as the colony itself – resembling God. The old Commandant focused on human guilt, which "is never to be doubted". The comparison between the machine used in the penal colony and the world in general could mean that the purpose of life is to deserve salvation from the guilt by means of suffering. According to Jennifer Geddes, however, interpreting the usage of the contraption in such a way could result in glossing over the story's lesson – dangers of viewing events as a form of a theodicy, secular or sacred.

More parallels include the new, more liberal rules established in the colony after the death of the original Commandant, which might represent the New Testament. Similarly to the way in which Christianity evolved from "old law of the Hebraic tradition" to the merciful rules of the New Testament, we can see such progression in Kafka's story. The officer could represent Christ, but in "Kafka's inversion of traditional Christian theology", he sacrifices himself to showcase his support for the former Commandant, as opposed to the new rules. The inscription on the grave of the old Commandant may also imply that the "second coming" refers to the comeback of old rules.

Other critics, such as Heinz Politzer, Anthony Thorlby, and Peter Neumeyer, recognize the parallels and symbolism, but do not want to associate them with any specific biblical reading. Neumeyer added that the English translation of the short story created by Willa Muir and Edwin Muir contains inaccuracies, including those that support the religious interpretation, giving the reader a "misshapen image" of the story.

== Adaptations ==
- In 1969, the story was adapted as a play by Steven Berkoff, who also played The Officer.
- In 1970, Chilean filmmaker Raúl Ruiz made a film called The Penal Colony, based on the story.
- In 1999, Charlie Deaux wrote and directed the short avant-garde film "Zoetrope", which is loosely based upon the story. The score of the film was written and performed by Lustmord.
- In 2000, composer Philip Glass wrote a chamber opera, In the Penal Colony, based on the story.
- In 2004, the story was adapted by Robert Crumb, in R. Crumb's Kafka, ISBN 0743493443.
- In 2006, a 24-minute film adaptation by Turkish-born Canadian filmmaker Sibel Guvenc was released.
- In 2009, Iranian filmmaker Narges Kalhor showed her short film adaptation Dharkhish (Persian: دارخیش), or The Rake, at the Nuremberg International Human Rights Film Festival.
- In July 2011, the ShiberHur Theatre Company of Palestine presented a new version of In the Penal Colony, adapted by Amir Nizar Zuabi, at London's Young Vic.
- In 2012, Egyptian independent theatrical group Warsha performed an Arabic language adaption in Cairo directed by Hassan El Geretly.
- In 2014, a 40-minute film adaptation created by filmmakers in Las Vegas, Nevada, was released on Vimeo.
- In 2018, a new theatrical adaptation, Franz Kafka – Apparatus, written and directed by Welsh playwright Ross Dinwiddy, premiered at The Rialto Theatre Brighton as part of the Brighton Fringe. In a departure from the source text, Dinwiddy explores the sexual attraction that develops between The Soldier and The Condemned Man and changes the gender of The Officer from male to female.
- In 2025, the story was adapted as a part of Agnieszka Holland's film Franz.

== In popular culture ==
Frank Zappa, in the liner notes of the Mothers of Invention album We're Only in It for the Money (1968), recommends reading the short story before listening to the track "The Chrome Plated Megaphone of Destiny."

Ian Curtis of the band Joy Division was inspired by "In the Penal Colony" to write the song "Colony" from the album Closer (1980).

The novel The Shadow of the Torturer (1980) by Gene Wolfe follows the exploits of a member of a guild of torturers. At one point, when giving a tour of the facilities to a condemned prisoner, the head of the guild describes a device identical to the one presented in this short story.

Ivan Klíma mentions in his novel Love and Garbage (1986) that the first story by Kafka that he had ever read was about "a traveller to whom an officer on some island wants to demonstrate, with love and dedication, his own bizarre execution machine."

In Haruki Murakami's novel Kafka on the Shore (2002), the protagonist, a boy who calls himself Kafka, says that "In the Penal Colony" is his favorite of Franz Kafka's short stories. He adds, "I think that Kafka does is give a purely mechanical explanation of that complex machine in the story, as a sort of substitute for explaining the situation we're in."

The album Public Strain (2010) by Canadian rock band Women features the song "Penal Colony", which references Kafka's story.

The 2015 video game Resident Evil: Revelations 2 contains many references to Kafka's works. Along with being set within an island colony, the first episode is named "The Penal Colony" after the story, a file found within the game contains an excerpt from In the Penal Colony, and one of the locations features a torture device similar to the one described by Kafka.

== English translations ==
- (1941) Translated by Eugene Jolas, Partisan Review, March–April 1941, pp. 98–107, 146–158.
- (1948) Translated by Willa and Edwin Muir, in The Penal Colony, New York: Schocken Books, 1948.
- (1981) Translated by J. A. Underwood, in Franz Kafka: Stories, 1904–1924. Great Britain: Macdonald & Co. Reprinted in 1995 by UK: Abacus. ISBN 0 349 10659 2.
- (1992) Translated by Malcolm Pasley, in The Transformation and Other Stories: Works Published During Kafka's Lifetime, Penguin Books.
- (1995) Translated by Willa and Edwin Muir, in The Complete Stories. Nahum N. Glatzer, ed. New York: Schocken Books, 1995, pp. 140–167. ISBN 0-8052-1055-5.
- (1996) Translated by Donna Freed, in The Metamorphosis and Other Stories, New York: Barnes & Noble, 1996. ISBN 978-1-56619-969-8.
- (2007) Translated by Stanley Corngold, in Kafka's Selected Stories, Norton Critical Edition, New York: Norton, 2007, pp. 35–59. ISBN 978-0-393-92479-4.
- (2013) Translated by Peter Wortsman, in Tales of the German Imagination, from Brothers Grimm to Ingeborg Bachmann, London: Penguin Classics, 2013. This translation later collected in Konundrum: Selected Prose of Franz Kafka, Brooklyn: Archipelago Books, 2016.
- (2024) Translated by Mark Harman, in Selected Stories: Franz Kafka, Cambridge, Massachusetts, and London, England: The Belknap Press of Harvard University Press. ISBN 9780674737983
