= The Cremator =

- Czech theatrical release poster
- Directed by: Juraj Herz
- Written by: Ladislav Fuks; Juraj Herz
- Produced by: Ladislav Hanuš
- Starring: Rudolf Hrušínský; Vlasta Chramostová
- Cinematography: Stanislav Milota
- Edited by: Jaromír Janáček
- Music by: Zdeněk Liška
- Production company: Barrandov Studios
- Distributed by: Central Office of Film Distribution
- Release date: March 14, 1969
- Running time: 100 minutes
- Country: Czechoslovakia
- Languages: Czech; Hebrew

The Cremator (Czech: Spalovač mrtvol) is a 1969 Czechoslovak dark comedy horror film directed by Juraj Herz, based on a novel by Ladislav Fuks. The screenplay was written by Herz and Fuks. The film was selected as the Czechoslovak entry for the Best Foreign Language Film at the 42nd Academy Awards, but was not nominated. In 1972, it won the Festival de Cine de Sitges Best Film award, where it also received awards for its star Rudolf Hrušínský and cinematographer Stanislav Milota.

Set in 1930s Prague, Karel Kopfrkingl slowly devolves from an odd but relatively well-meaning cremator of the dead into a murderer of his family and mass murderer who proposes to run the ovens at extermination camps due to the influence of the Nazi party and Tibetan Buddhism, as he believes his murders are "liberating" the souls of the deceased into a better life. The film consists mostly of monologues from Kopfrkingl that follow his descent into madness. Influenced by German Expressionist film, it is often cited as an example of the Czechoslovak New Wave. The film was withdrawn from circulation in 1973 and not seen again until 1990, after the collapse of the communist system in Czechoslovakia in 1989.

With a 90.2% score on the Czech and Slovak Movie Database as well as praise from film critics, The Cremator is often considered to be one of the best films ever made in Czechoslovakia. It has also gathered a prominent cult following.

== Plot ==
The film takes place against the backdrop of the political radicalization of Europe during the 1930s, specifically the demise of the First Czechoslovak Republic and the installation of the Protectorate of Bohemia and Moravia under Nazi Germany in 1939. It is also set in the aftermath of the death of the 13th Dalai Lama, in 1933.

Karel "Roman" Kopfrkingl works at a crematorium (which he refers to as "Temple of Death") in Prague. While taking his wife and children to visit the zoo to visit the leopard's cage where he first met his wife seventeen years previously, he mentions that he wishes to invite his new assistant Mr. Strauss to a gathering.

The gathering has many elderly people and those interested in funeral preparations. An "abstinent", Kopfrkingl wants no alcohol on the premises; only tea and "weak coffee" are to be served. He also puts out the cigar of a smoker. Kopfrkingl meets Strauss and tells him that he wants to take him on as an agent. Karel's wife Marie (whom he calls Lakmé) compliments Strauss as being a good businessman and a Jew. Kopfrkingl retorts that Strauss is a German surname but Lakme says names are not always what they appear. Kopfrkingl delivers a speech to them about the importance of cremation and the reincarnation that awaits them. He states he believes that he is not merely cremating the dead, but liberating the souls of the departed. He also reads excerpts from a book about Tibetan mysticism by Alexandra David-Néel.

While browsing paintings Kopfrikingl settles on a painting of Emiliano Chamorro Vargas that he brings home to his wife, claiming it is actually of Louis Marin. Reinke, a former soldier who fought with Kopfrikingl in the Austro-Hungarian army during WWI, comes over to Kopfrkingl's house and describes in great detail his support of Adolf Hitler and the good things the Nazis have done in Austria. He gives Kopfrkingl a flyer about joining the party, but Kopfrkingl remains uncertain due to his Czech heritage. Reinke suggests that he could have some German ancestry as well.

Kopfrkingl shows the new assistant Mr. Dvořák the ropes at the crematorium. While discussing the crisis in Sudetenland Kopfrkingl says he is not worried because of his German ancestry. He asks Mrs. Lisková, a coworker he is smitten with, to go on the tour of the facility with them but she refuses. Kopfrkingl shows Dvorak the catafalque and the coffin room. Dvorak bumps into a metal rod standing against the wall and Kopfrkingl snaps at him not to put it back where it was. He also expresses dismay at Mr. Dvořák's smoking, but allows him to continue. Later, Kopfrkingl makes an unwanted sexual advance on Mrs. Lisková. When unsuccessful, he visits a brothel to see a prostitute who looks exactly like his wife named Dagmar.

Kopfrkingl takes his wife and children on visits to a carnival (in particular a wax museum displaying gruesome murders, severed heads, and body parts) and to a boxing match, but it remains clear that he is aloof and cut off from them. At a Christmas Eve dinner, Kopfrkingl openly mentions his new-found respect for the Nazi party, which begins to worry his wife. On Reinke's orders, Kopfrkingl spies on a Jewish ceremony and makes a false report at the Nazi-owned casino that they scheme against the Reich, as well as condemning his coworkers, who are later arrested, leading Kopfrkingl to becoming the head of the crematorium. Reinke thanks him for his work but warns him that his wife is possibly Jewish due to her having prepared a Jewish-style carp dinner for them on Christmas Eve and having hid Reinke’s invitation to the boxing match. He tells Kopfrkingl that it will be impossible for him to get better positions within the party if he remains married to her.

Kopfrkingl hangs his wife from a noose. After the murder, he sees visions of himself as a Tibetan Buddhist monk assuring himself that he is doing the right thing by "liberating" his victims and that he will be rewarded by becoming the next Dalai Lama. The monk says he must prepare to journey to the eternal Fatherland in the Himalayas. Kopfrkingl later delivers a eulogy for his wife, but it quickly descends into a Hitler-influenced mania about the importance of death in the new world order that the Führer is creating. Most of his former friends leave, but Reinke and his Nazi comrades are overjoyed and give him the Nazi salute.

Kopfrkingl visits a brothel with Reinke where they talk about Mili. Kopfrkingl says he is worried by how effeminate and weak he has become and that his mother's coddling is responsible. Reinke tells Kopfrkingl that quarter-Jews will not be allowed to go to German schools or pursue careers in the Third Reich. Kopfrkingl then takes Mili on a trip to see the crematorium. In the basement, Koprikingl encounter Mr. Dvořák hanged corpse, but hides it before Mili can see. Kopfrkingl then kills his son with the metal rod Mr. Dvořák knocked over earlier. He puts his son in a coffin with a dead German and cremates the coffin. The monk reappears and tells him that he is the reincarnated Buddha. He tells the vision that he will ascend the Tibetan throne in Lhasa but only after he liberates his part-Jewish daughter.

A Nazi leader tells Kopfrkingl about the use of gas chambers, which he very much approves of. He sees it as a faster way to liberate more people than his crematorium. Overjoyed, he experiences mania but the Nazi minister tells him to calm down and remember to keep the plan secret. He takes his daughter to the basement of his crematorium and attempts to murder her with the iron rod, but she gets away when he is distracted by another vision of the monk. The monk tells him the time has come for him to rule the throne as the next Dalai Lama and that the people of the world beckon for his wise guidance. Kopfrkingl exits the crematorium and sees Nazi commanders parked outside. He tells them that his daughter unfortunately got away, and they state that they will eliminate his daughter for him. In the final scene, Kopfrkingl is driven away to oversee death camps with a woman in black chasing after the car in the rain. He states "I shall save them all. The whole world". The closing shot is of the Potala Palace in Tibet.

== Cast ==
- Rudolf Hrušínský as Karel Kopfrkingl
- Vlasta Chramostová as Lakmé; Dagmar
- Jana Stehnová as Zina
- Miloš Vognič as Mili
- Zora Božinová as Erna Reinkeová
- Ilja Prachař as Walter Reinke
- Eduard Kohout as Bettleheim
- Míla Myslíková as woman in hat
- Vladimír Menšík as husband of woman in hat
- Jiří Menzel as Dvořák
- Jiří Lír as Strauss
- Helena Anýzová as Death/ woman at cremation speech/ wax figure/ prostitute/ boxing match spectator
- Jindřich Narenta as Nazi friend of Reinke
- Marie Rosůlková as elderly woman who demands a Rakvička dessert
- Dimitri Rafalsky as Mr. Fenek (dubbed in Czech by Josef Kemr)
- Růžena Vlčková as Anežka
- Oldřich Vízner as Kája
- Václav Štekl as musician/ boxing referee/ wax museum showman
- Nataša Gollová as Mrs. Iris
- Jiří Hálek as Mr. Holý
- Jiří Kaftan as murderer in the wax museum
- Jan Kraus as Vojtech Prachar

== Production ==
The Cremator was Herz's second feature film. The film is based on a novel by Ladislav Fuks Spalovač mrtvol (lit. 'Burner of the dead (dead people/dead bodies'). The main character is played by Rudolf Hrušínský, an actor previously known for his comedic main role as the soldier Josef Švejk in Dobrý voják Švejk and Poslušně hlásím.

Herz wrote the script first and then filmed exactly by the script. He was very pleased with the original script and mentioned that he had left extra space for empty pages in the back of the book for anything else that might come to mind, but those pages were never used.

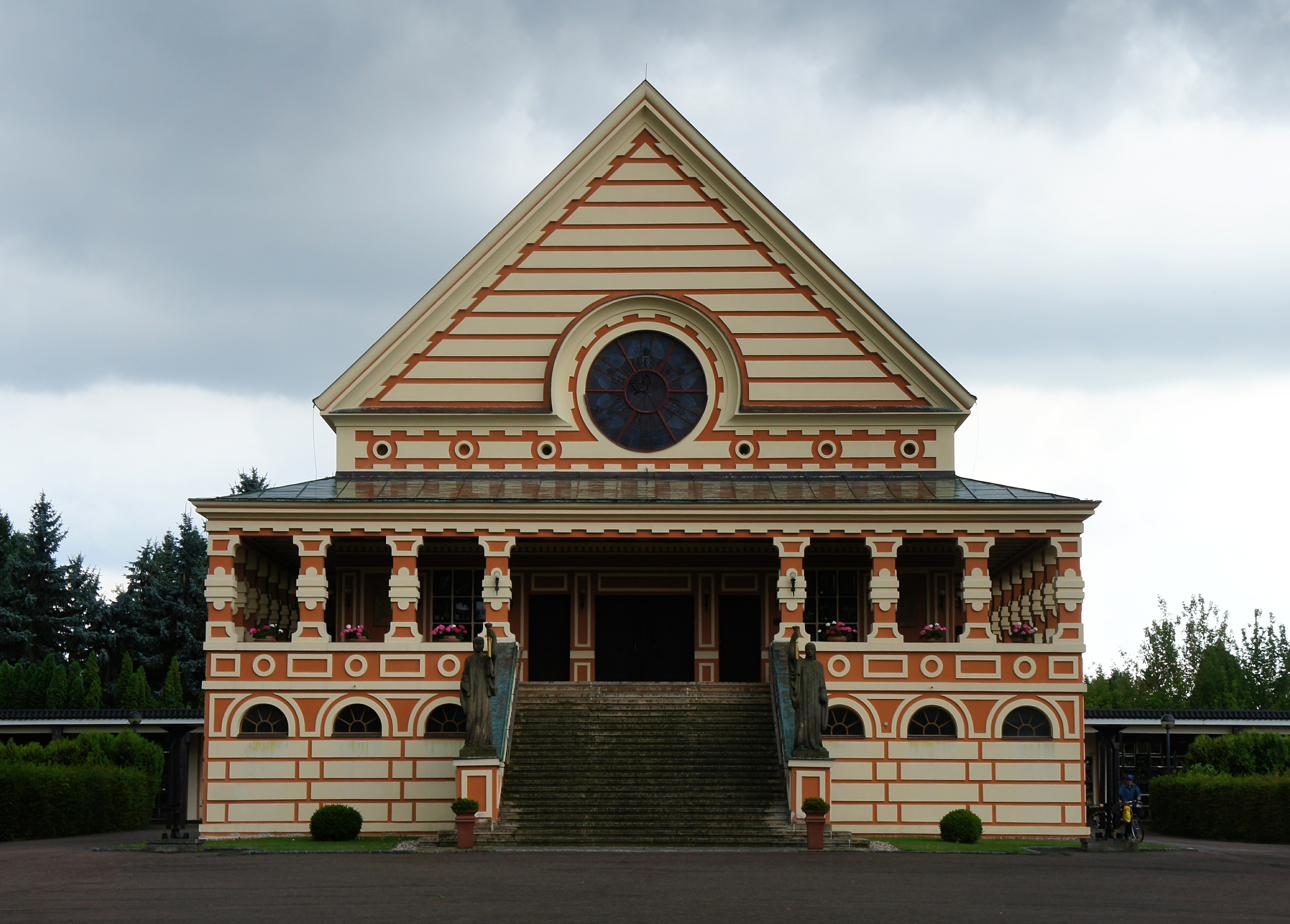
Crematorium in Pardubice, Czech Republic

There were multiple shooting locations: Kopfrkingl's "Temple of Death" was shot at three different crematoria. The first one was a crematorium in Prague in which Mr. Dvorak's suicide, the murder of Mili and the attempted murder of Zina were shot. The actors were well-prepared for these scenes and always ended on time at 3 PM because they did not want to be around the coffins with dead bodies inside. Filming took place during July and August in the middle of the summer heat and the bodies were starting to smell. The second shooting location was an urn grave in Plzeň. The third shooting location was a crematorium in Pardubice that was chosen by the film's set designer. This building was built in a Cubist style and makes up all of the exterior shots of the crematorium. The eulogy for Lakme and the subsequent Hitler-style rant delivered by Kopfrkingl on the importance of death were also filmed here. The tour of the ovens Kopfrkingl gives to Mr. Dvořák was shot near the ovens in the back of this crematorium. Herz set up two torches outside the main entrance that were used in the film (referred to as "Spartan torches" in the film by Kopfrkingl). The building retains these torches to this day even though they were set up for the film. The crematorium in Pardubice was declared a National Cultural Monument by the Czech government due to its appearance in this film and impact on Czech culture. These shooting locations and description of the actor's feelings while behind the scenes can be heard described by Herz himself in the documentary This Way to the Cooling Chambers which he made for the German release of The Cremator.

None of the actors had much trouble shooting in the crematoria besides Menzel. Vlasta Chramostová would rehearse each scene to herself to prepare while Hrušínský just wanted the first shot. Hrušínský did not like to prepare at all for his roles; he preferred to do all the acting on the stage and screen. This acting method probably originated from his stage origins.

Olga Dimitrovová was responsible for the costume design while Frantisek Straka designed the sets and chose the crematoria to use.

Herz and the story's author Ladislav Fuks shared a love of the macabre and gallows humor but Herz did not like how dialogue heavy The Cremator was and initially thought it was uncinematic. Herz thought the title alone was interesting enough for its own movie but didn't like the long monologues.

Music composer Zdenek Liska bet a box of champagne to the cameraman Stanislav Milota that the film would not be successful or stick to the script. Liska was forced to buy Milota the wine after it was completed.

This is the only film on which actress Vlasta Chramostová collaborated with her husband Stanislav Milota. She recalls that when the film began to be shot in the relaxed pre-August atmosphere of 1968, no one would have guessed that it would become an award-winning cult film. After the shoot and the premiere, the film was banned by the Socialist government. She recalled a humorous story where her husband Stanislav Milota (film cinematographer) prophetically answered her question about how they want to shoot the scene with Kopfrkingl hanging her from the noose in the bathroom. Stanislav Milota replied with sarcasm worthy of Kopfrkingl: "Like it's your last shot." He had no idea what truth he had just prophesied as Vlasta Chramostová was not allowed to act after August 1968 and Stanislav Milota also ended his career in Czech film.

=== Cinematography ===
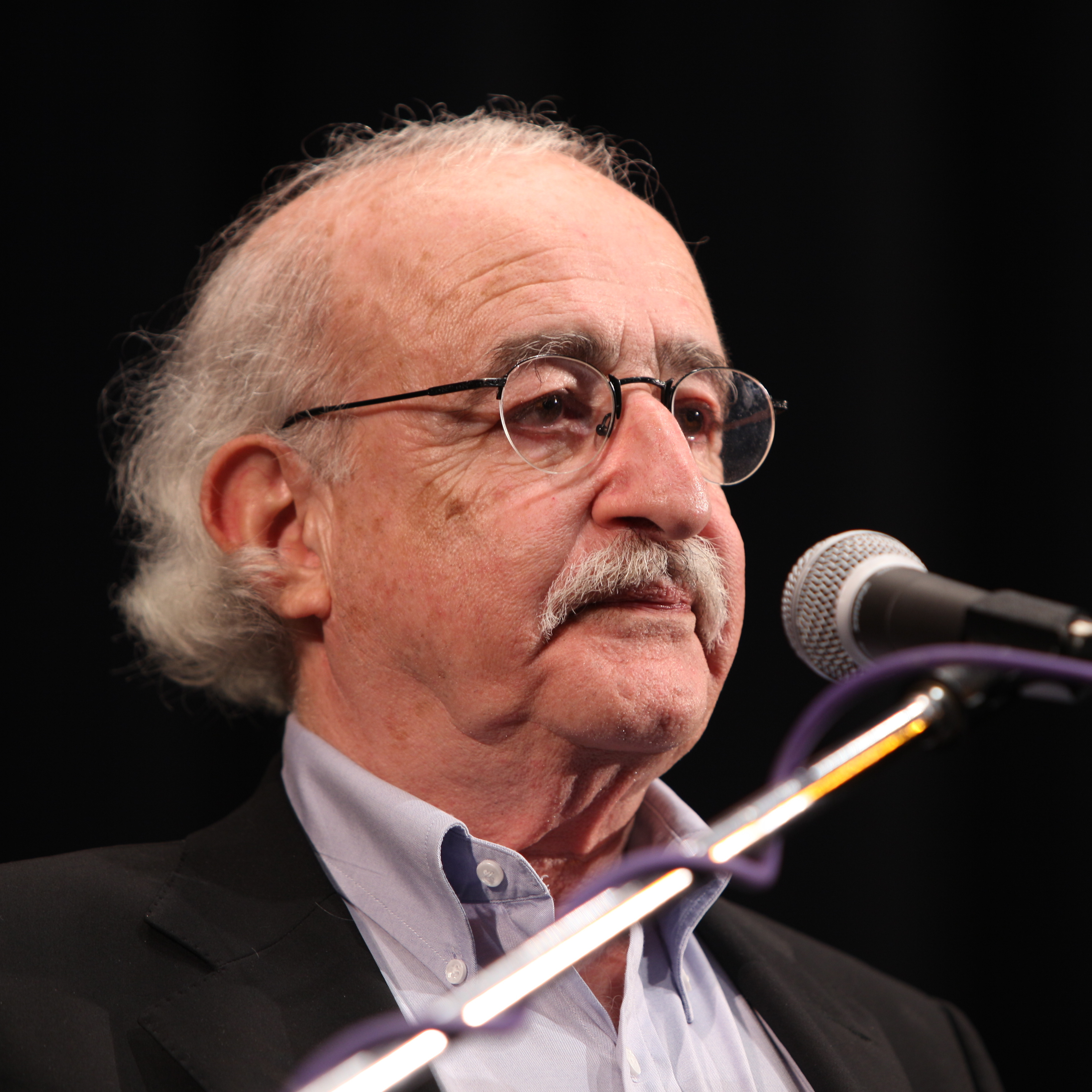
Juraj Herz in 2009

The film was shot in black and white even though the director Juraj Herz wanted it to be in color. Herz initially planned the film to be in color but with all the clothing and sets in very dark, macabre colors such as black and grey. The only bright colors would have been the skin tone of the cast and the red of the blood in the murder scenes. This plan fell through though because Stanislav Milota thought it was a bad idea that would not work. He would not work with Herz if the film were in color so Herz chose black and white. The film was shot without sound and all the dialogue and music was added with post-synchronization in post-production. Stanislav Milota shot the film with wide lenses so that small rooms filled with coffins would seem much larger. Stanislav Milota used unusual camera tricks and lenses that were not common before while making this film. He used the fisheye lens to distort Rudolf Hrušínský and make his appearance seem more grotesque (the credits to this film feature a literal "fish eye"). The fisheye lens wasn't widely available in Czechoslovakia so Milota had to go to France to acquire one. The fisheye lens combined with closeups to Kopfrkingl make his face very elongated and creepy at points like when Kopfrkingl makes sexual advances on a female coworker at the morgue before another employee stops him. Herz thought the fisheye lens was overused in this film though many film critics are pleased with the final product.

Jaromír Janáček's editing is also fast and erratic paralleling Kopfrkingl's delicate mental state. Grotesque shots of dead bodies with syphilis and paintings of nude women are spliced into the middle of conversations at odd points to disorient the viewer and make them feel uncomfortable. Sartre's novel The Reprieve also served as an inspiration for the editing, particularly the scene where Reinke has Kopfrkingl spy on the Jewish ceremony. In Sartre's book, two characters talk to one another though only later do you find out they are miles apart in different countries. This effect is used in the film where the Jewish singing at the ceremony and Kopfrkingl's expression is halted by Reinke whispering evil things about the Jews in his ear and prodding him to confess that they are agitating against the Germans. This effect is also used when Kopfrkingl gives a present to his favorite prostitute and then stands on a chair which then leads to him hanging a picture on his wife's bedroom wall, when he is looking at pictures of prostitutes and then turns around to serve Christmas Eve dinner and several other times throughout the film. Several times you also are led to believe Kopfrkingl is talking to someone and then the camera pans back to reveal it is actually someone else.

This editing style is used to very humorous effect in one morbid scene, in which Kopfrkingl asks Mr. Dvorak his opinion about suicide (the character commits the act later in the film). Mr. Dvorak meekly turns around and responds "I want out." The camera then pans to reveal he means he wants to work in the furnace room and "out" of the job in the coffin room at the other end of the building.

Kopfrkingl himself seems to have a bit of an obsession with photography and paintings. He says "a photograph eternally preserves the present moment" after having a picture taken of his family and his children's friends. In a very early scene, he is at a painting shop looking for a painting for his wife. His home is decorated with dozens of photos and paintings (some of which appear as naked women in his imagination, both in his home and at the painting store). At one point, he is given pictures by Reinke of blonde prostitutes the Nazis hire and he is sure to thoroughly examine each one. Before attempting to kill his daughter Zina he meets her boyfriend Kaja in the street and asks him to take a photo to preserve the present moment as it is though he doesn't have a camera on him and is unable to.

The monologue that Kopfrkingl delivers toward the end of the film on the death camps and the process of reincarnation is visually punctuated with frantic closeups of the paintings of Hieronymus Bosch. He is standing of the Right panel of Hieronymus Bosch's The Garden of Earthly Delights. As the speech becomes more frantic, what follows next is a montage of other Bosch paintings including; Christ Carrying the Cross, Ascent of the Blessed and The Seven Deadly Sins and the Four Last Things. These paintings depict the grotesque processes of death and ascension into the afterlife. These paintings visually accentuate Kopfrkingl's deteriorating mind and his obsession with death and the afterlife as he descends into madness.

=== Differences from the novel ===
The film keeps most of the novel's dialogue word for word but some of the context is changed and scenes are in different order. Some notable differences are also apparent. In the movie, Kopfrkingl is invited to the Jewish celebration by Dr. Bettelheim while in the novel he goes disguised as a beggar. The scene at the observatory where Kopfrkingl points out all the new buildings in Prague and their uses to the new regime, is also absent. In the book, the showman at the wax museum is a Greek woman but in the film, it is a slightly pudgy man with a bowtie. This was likely done to give Václav Stekl another role as Herz wanted some actors to play multiple roles. Most importantly, the novel ends with Kopfrkingl being taken away to a lunatic asylum by "angels in white" (security guards) while in the movie, the ending is much bleaker with Kopfrkingl being driven away to run the death camps.

=== Lost ending ===
The original ending was deleted in post-production and is assumed lost. In the scene, two of the former crematorium employees are chatting at a coffee shop while Soviet tanks roll by. Two female employees are discussing Kopfrkingl and how he was a nice man and always practiced abstinence. They wonder what happened to him. The next shot is then of a building blowing up and depressed faces reflected in the shards of glass among the rubble. Then Kopfrkingl's face is seen again in the middle of a crowd, gleefully smiling. This scene was removed by the studio director possibly due to being too critical of the post-68 Soviet backed government. The director Juraj Herz believes the negatives of this scene were burned and are now lost forever. The intention of this scene was to show that conformists exist all the time, no matter the ideology.

== Influences ==
Herz had access to many western films prior to production, especially those by Alfred Hitchcock, Victor Sjöström, Ingmar Bergman and also Luis Buñuel. It is possible to see the influence of these directors in the film but Herz firmly denied he copied them but only enjoyed watching them. Herz enjoyed watching genre and horror films himself even though at that time it was looked down upon. He liked genre films because he saw them as easier opportunities to include macabre imagery and eroticism which he liked. These would be hard to incorporate into drama films.

Jan Švankmajer's influence is also seen in the first scene at the zoo. Some of the shots are also influenced by Sartre. Herz shared many similarities with Švankmajer including the use of a surrealist style. They both influenced each other. The film makes good use of surrealist techniques and acting methods. Herz cast actors in different, contradictory roles within the film in order to confuse. For example, the actress who plays Kopfrkingl's pure wife Maria/ Lakme also plays the prostitute Dagmar in the scene in Mrs. Iris's brothel. The intention of this device was to confuse and make the film off-putting. Juraj Herz uses it in other films too.

== Themes ==
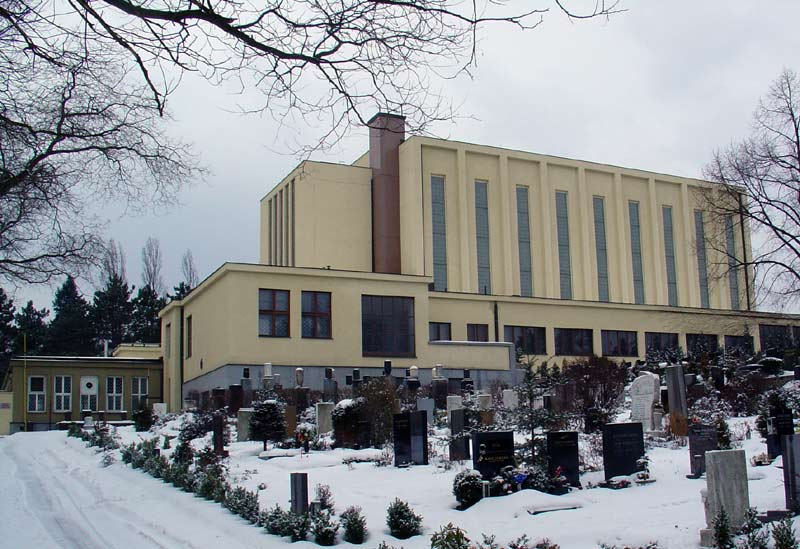
Strašnice Crematorium in Prague

The story depicts the rise of Nazism and collaboration among Czechs during World War II. The Nazi ideology caused many German-descended Czech citizens to side with the Nazis during occupation. Kopfrkingl's hair is cut and parted in a similar fashion to Hitler's. His partly Jewish children Mili and Zina are introduced playing around in cages at the zoo. Kopfrkingl responds by telling his children to get out and that "cages are for dumb creatures". At the funeral for his wife, Kopfrkingl delivers a Hitler-style oration from a podium that resembles Hitler's in Triumph of the Will. The speech gradually descends into mania with many of his wife's friends and relatives leaving while Kopfrkingl states the importance of death in "the Führer's happy new Europe". This gets him a Roman salute and "Heil" from his Nazi compatriots. Even the visions he receives while Buddhist in nature use Nazi style rhetoric. The monk says Kopfrkingl must ascend the throne of "the beloved Fatherland Tibet" and rule it with his noble guidance and that the world is waiting to be "liberated". Kopfrkingl kills his own family, the ones who should be dearest to him, in the name of the Nazi ideology and his deluded visions of what constitutes a "paradise on Earth".

In keeping with the ideological expectations of the Socialist era, Kopfrkingl is middle class while the innocent victims are his working-class employees. They are named mostly after small, harmless animals to denote this, Beran (Lamb), Liska (fox), Vrana (Crow), Zajic (hare), Pelikan (Pelican), Danek (deer), Fenek (desert fox), Veverka (squirrel), Vlk (wolf), Piskor (weather loach), sykora (great tit), Srnec (Roebuck).

Interestingly, though the Nazis and the Third Reich government feature so heavily and are the main focus, they are never referred to by their actual name, the National Socialist German Workers' Party, just as "the party". The leaflets the Nazis use in this film are also modelled after the ones the Communist party in Czechoslovakia used at the time.

Though she never speaks, Death is portrayed by Helena Anýzová. She appears in the background in scenes that relate to death in some way or where Kopfrkingl is grappling with his conscience. His reactions to her are always negative. She is a spectator at Kopfrkingl's speech about the importance of cremation, in the background in the painting store, a figure in the wax museum, a prostitute at Mrs. Iris', and in the crowd at the boxing match that turns violent. She is also seen when the Gestapo come to arrest Mr. Strauss, Mr. Fenek and others at the Crematorium, immediately before and after Kopfrkingl murders his family and chasing after his car at the very end of the film while he is on his way to the extermination camps. Whenever Kopfrkingl sees Anýzová's character he gets angry as if he realizes his actions are cruel and will result in pain and torment but he must suppress it.

The propaganda of the Nazis and the reality of their horrors are seen by Kopfrkingl's "abstinence". Throughout, Kopfrkingl loudly professes his abstinence to alcohol and devotion to his wife when in reality, he visits prostitutes at a brothel, sexually harasses a female coworker at the morgue and drinks quite a bit. He downplays his drinking by stating they are only "ceremonial glasses". He also gripes constantly about Mr. Dvorak's smoking when this character is only seen smoking briefly a couple times. His opening monologue at the zoo also mentions how much he loves his family and will do anything for them when the entire film is about him murdering them. Kopfrkingl's inner ferocious and bloodthirsty nature is portrayed from this very first scene at the zoo. He discusses how he met his wife at the leopard's cage and closeups of his Hitler style hair are intercut with shots of the leopard moving around in its cage. His wife and children are shown in a more sympathetic manner with the children goofing around with smiles on their face in the cages.

The film relies heavily on black comedy revolving around death and cremation. Herz noted that he tried to distill the frightening scenes with humor, because it lightens the horror. Humor was also a way to keep it from being censored by the Czechoslovak government. The director intentionally combined horror with humor.

Míla Myslíková and Vladimír Menšík add a humorous touch through their comedic side characters. Myslikova plays a ditzy, airheaded woman who cluelessly stumbles around into the actions of the main cast while Mensik plays her hair-trigger husband with a ferocious temper who is constantly berating her for being so clueless. These characters serve as a sort of Greek chorus to comment on the main cast's actions. In Mensik's very last appearance he is looking for his wife who was last with him at the cemetery. He off-handedly mentions he saw Kopfrkingl with Mili before Mili disappeared. This makes Zina a bit suspicious but she continues with Karel anyhow, while in the next scene Karel attempts to murder her.

== Music ==
The score was composed by Zdenek Liska. Before production, Liska asked Herz what type of film it would be, would it be scary or pretty? Herz replied, "There's already enough in this film that's scary. Go for melodious and lovely." Kopfrkingl is a dilettante that is obsessed with classical composers such as Strauss, Dvorak, Saint-Saens and Mahler. The score reflects this by being a beautiful waltz. Kopfrkingl plays it on the radio several times throughout the film, both at family gatherings but also before committing his murders. His daughter Zina also practices the tune on the piano in an early scene. The score also uses many traditional Asian instruments and music such as gongs, bells and chanting whenever the vision of the Tibetan monk appears to Kopfrkingl and also when he is describing in detail the process of reincarnation for the Nazi leader. In the final scene at the coffin room where Kopfrkingl attempts to murder his daughter, the European waltz is playing but Asian motifs such as the gongs and bells are added when the vision appears to him. The gongs and bells blend with the waltz. This makes the film truly unique as nothing like it had ever been done before at the time. Mixing European waltzes with traditional Asian motifs was unheard of in film scores.

Besides using traditional Asian instruments, the score is unique in other ways. Everyday tools are part of the music. When Kopfrkingl kills his son and puts him in the coffin the waltz plays. He hammers the nails into the coffin and this hammering rhythmically becomes part of the waltz and leads into the Tibetan bell motif and chanting in the next scene (the hammering and the bells are the exact same rhythm and tempo).

== Release ==
=== Home media ===
The film was released on DVD by Second Run on April 10, 2006. It was later re-released on DVD by Dark Sky Films on March 31, 2009. A new 4K transfer was released by the Criterion Collection on April 21, 2020. It is spine #1023.

=== Critical reception ===
Jason Pirodsky of The Prague Reporter praised the film, writing, "Spalovač mrtvol is a masterpiece of atmosphere, conveying the horror of the Holocaust through style rather than story; stark black & white cinematography by Stanislav Milota is a real standout, while unusual rapid-fire editing by Jaromír Janáček helps to keeps the viewer off balance." Adam Schofield, writing in A Black Pearl of the Deep: Juraj Herz's The Cremator stated that audiences unfamiliar with Eastern Europe's political past could "surely enjoy it as a work of black comedy or psychological horror" as it was an "ingeniously orchestrated film, full of complexities, and capable of giving the horror genre a better name." Herz commented that the film's reaction were different in every country, noting that "In Prague, people were depressed; in Slovakia, they laughed; in the Netherlands, it was a comedy from the beginning to the end." TV Guide awarded the film 3/5 stars, stating that "Hrusinsky's scary performance highlights this morbid, darkly funny work."

The Cremator was screened at the Sorrento Film Festival in 1969 and the Sitges Film Festival in 1972. It continues to be screened at film festivals around the globe even today, most recently at the Zagreb Film Festival in 2015, the Washington Jewish Film Festival in 2016, and the Athens International Film Festival, the Mumbai Film Festival, and the Karlovy Vary Film Festival in 2019.

On the review aggregator website Rotten Tomatoes, 89% of 9 critics' reviews are positive.

== See also ==
- List of submissions to the 42nd Academy Awards for Best Foreign Language Film
- List of Czechoslovak submissions for the Academy Award for Best Foreign Language Film

== Sources ==
- Paszylk, Bartłomiej (2009). The Pleasure and Pain of Cult Horror Films: An Historical Survey. McFarland. ISBN 978-0786453276.
