= Domokos Elekes =

Hungarian lawyer and Unitarian church leader in Transylvania (1889–1962)

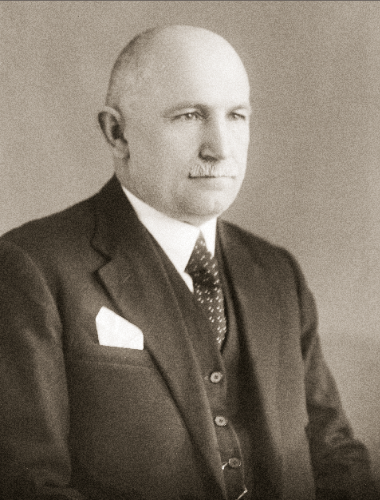
- Elekes in about 1935
- Born: 8 October 1889; Siménfalva, Kingdom of Hungary, Austria-Hungary (now Șimonești, Romania)
- Died: 25 August 1962 (aged 72)
- Education: Franz Joseph University, Kolozsvár (Cluj-Napoca)
- Occupations: Lawyer, politician, landowner
- Known for: Chief warden of the Transylvanian Unitarian Church (1938–1941)

Domokos Elekes of Derzs (Hungarian: derzsi Elekes Domokos; 8 October 1889 – 25 August 1962) was a Hungarian lawyer, minority politician and landowner in Transylvania, now Romania, and one of the leading lay figures of the Transylvanian Unitarian Church in the first half of the 20th century.

Elected chief warden (főgondnok) of the Transylvanian Unitarian Church on 2 October 1938, he was the 33rd holder of the office since its creation in 1708, and was later made perpetual chief warden. As chairman of the school-maintenance committee formed in 1931 he secured, from public donations alone, seven years of funding for the upper school of the Unitarian gymnasium at Cristuru Secuiesc (Székelykeresztúr) after the church had resolved to close it.

== Early life and education ==
Elekes was born on 8 October 1889 in Siménfalva, Austria-Hungary (today Șimonești, Romania). His father, Dénes Elekes, was a landowner and chairman of a credit cooperative; his mother was Eszter Nagy. He followed the career choice of his elder brother, also named Dénes Elekes, who was a lawyer.

After elementary school in his native village he attended the Unitarian gymnasium at Székelykeresztúr (now Cristuru Secuiesc), and in 1905 was a member of the first cohort able to complete six grades there; he spent the final two years of secondary school at the Unitarian college in Kolozsvár (now Cluj-Napoca). As a schoolboy he excelled above all at athletics, and also placed well in weightlifting, vaulting, the shot and fencing. He passed his school-leaving examination on 16 June 1907.

He then enrolled at the law faculty of the Franz Joseph University in Kolozsvár, sat his first legal examination in 1910 and his second in 1911, and was made a doctor of laws on 25 November 1911.

== Legal career ==
He was entered on the roll of trainee lawyers of the Marosvásárhely Bar with effect from 23 December 1910, working in his brother's practice at Székelykeresztúr. In October 1913 he applied to the Kolozsvár Bar and worked in the office of the advocate Balázs Bíró, returning to his brother's practice in February 1914.

He passed the bar examination at Marosvásárhely (now Târgu Mureș) during World War I, having prepared for it while convalescing in the Székelykeresztúr hospital from his second serious wound. His admission as an advocate followed only on 8 August 1918, with his seat at Székelykeresztúr. His practice was hampered when the district court was moved away from the town after 1919, and he took on the standing legal representation of several cooperatives to secure his livelihood.

When the Marosvásárhely Bar was re-established in 1941 following the Second Vienna Award, he became a full member of its board and of its disciplinary court.

== World War I ==
Elekes was called up at the mobilisation of 29 July 1914 and was wounded three times in front-line service, which he ended as a reserve first lieutenant of Jäger.

On 21 April 1915 on the Russian front he carried reserve ammunition to the front line under the heaviest fire, enabling Russian troops who had broken into the trench to be driven out and 250 prisoners taken; for this he received the Small Silver Medal for Bravery. He was awarded the Silver Medal for Bravery, 2nd class, for his conduct in the attack of 26 May 1915, and was lightly wounded in the fighting near Verkhni Hayi. On 6 June 1916, fighting independently with his platoon near Krasne on the Bug, his machine-gun fire inflicted heavy losses on the enemy, for which he received the Bronze Medal for Bravery (Signum Laudis); wounded by a shell burst, he nonetheless led his platoon in a further attack.

On the Italian front, in the fighting between Medeazza and Flondar on 4–5 June 1917, his machine-gun platoon stormed two heights and held the position for four hours against Italian counter-attacks; he was wounded in the head but remained conscious and fought on, and was awarded the Military Merit Cross, 3rd class, with war decoration. Having spent more than twelve uninterrupted weeks in front-line service he also received the Charles Troop Cross.

== Internment ==
Romanian troops entered Székelykeresztúr in December 1918. In September 1919, on the order of prefect Neamțiu and, as Hungarian notary and researcher Gábor Rokolya described it, with the aim of intimidating the population, five leading figures of local society were taken to an internment camp: Elekes, his brother Dénes, the lawyers János Gombos and Gábor Ferentzy, and the Roman Catholic parish priest János Orbán. They were held first at Odorheiu Secuiesc (Székelyudvarhely) and then for six weeks in the fortress at Făgăraș (Fogaras).

== Public life ==
=== Sport and culture ===
On 19 May 1921, on his initiative, the Cristuru Secuiesc Athletic Club (KAC) was founded — the first sports club in the territory of the former Udvarhely County — and he was elected its first president. The club had football, skittles, athletics and tennis sections. He stood down from the presidency in the 1930s and was made honorary president.

He was also the first president of the town's artisans' choral society, formed after World War I, and its honorary president from the early 1940s.

In 1935 he was elected president of the Cristuru Secuiesc casino, a social club founded in 1867 that then had 140 members. Under his presidency, at the club's 70th anniversary, a painting of his brother Dénes — who had died young — was unveiled. He also instituted the annual commemorative dinner in honour of Balázs Orbán, held on the writer's birthday, 3 February. He handed the presidency to Miklós Szakács in 1941 and was made honorary president.

=== Economic advocacy ===
Elekes supplemented his income from the law by farming an estate of 60 cadastral holds, which made him one of the larger landowners locally. He belonged to the Transylvanian Hungarian Agricultural Society (EMGE), at whose meetings he repeatedly spoke in support of the Cristuru Secuiesc flax mill.

In 1943 he appealed against the county authority's decision on the route of the Székely Land railway, wanting the branch line taken to Székelykeresztúr rather than Csíkszereda (now Miercurea Ciuc). He also proposed developing the spas at Szejke (now Seiche) and Fiatfalva (now Filiaș). Neither initiative was carried out.

=== Minority politics ===
Elekes led the Cristuru Secuiesc branch of the National Hungarian Party (OMP), founded in Cluj on 28 December 1922. In April 1925 he was elected to the supervisory board of the Hungarian press company in Romania. He was re-elected branch president on 15 December 1929 and again in 1933.

In December 1933 the gendarmerie removed the election posters of the OMP candidate Ede Abrudbányai and forbade Elekes and the executive vice-president Lajos Ütő to speak at the election rally. He resigned the presidency, and took no office either in the Hungarian People's Community under the royal dictatorship or in the Transylvanian Party between 1940 and 1944.

His last political role came in 1946, when he was elected president of the 1,990-member Cristuru Secuiesc branch of the Hungarian People's Union (MNSZ). In his programme speech he declared: "It is my conviction that the Hungarian People's Alliance must be a framework in which every person, without distinction of class, finds protection."

== Church activity ==
=== Saving the Cristuru Secuiesc gymnasium ===
A Romanian ministerial decree of 1924 closed 2,285 secondary schools in Transylvania; of the Unitarian Church's gymnasiums, the one at Turda (Torda) was closed. Facing a worsening financial position, in 1930 the church's representative council proposed closing the Cristuru Secuiesc gymnasium as well. In a leading article in the paper Unitárius Egyház, Elekes demanded that the parishes and church districts be consulted first, arguing that the three districts supporting the school represented 60–70 per cent of Unitarian believers.

At its meeting of 14–15 December 1930 the church's supreme council decided that the upper school could survive if its costs were met from outside the church budget. Elekes was elected chairman of the school-maintenance committee formed in January 1931. Donations from fifty Unitarian parishes and 1,290 individuals brought in 230,000 lei a year; smaller contributions were collected through the so-called "egg campaign", under which every Unitarian family in the town gave the school two eggs a week. Over the years of public maintenance ten million lei were raised, of which Elekes gave four million himself.

Recognising the seven years of self-financing, the supreme council resumed funding the upper school from 1938. In February 1939 Elekes was elected warden of the school.

=== Chief warden ===
On 2 October 1938 Elekes was elected chief warden of the Transylvanian Unitarian Church, the 33rd holder of the office since its creation in 1708. On his election he said that, "following in the footsteps of Elek Káli Nagy", he would not shrink from material sacrifices if they were needed.

His tenure coincided with the episcopate of Béla Varga and lasted only three years: he submitted his resignation on 7 November 1940 but remained in office until the synod. At the extraordinary session of the supreme council in Kolozsvár on 12 January 1941, which readmitted the Hungarian Unitarian church district, he called for internal disputes to be set aside. At the Marosvásárhely synod of 1941, which elected Miklós Józan bishop of the united church, Elekes was appointed perpetual chief warden in recognition of his work.

== Later life and death ==
In early 1950 identically worded "exposures" of "anti-people figures" sheltering in the church leadership appeared in Hungarian-language newspapers in Transylvania following the communist party line; Elekes was named among them. His land was expropriated by the state, depriving him of his livelihood as well as his work. He died in poverty and largely forgotten on 25 August 1962, in his 73rd year. His death notice recorded that "his life was filled with tireless work for his people and his church". His grave is in the cemetery at Șimonești.

== Honours ==
- Small Silver Medal for Bravery (1915)
- Silver Medal for Bravery, 2nd class (1915)
- Bronze Medal for Bravery, Signum Laudis (1916)
- Military Merit Cross, 3rd class, with war decoration (1917)
- Charles Troop Cross
