= Electromagnetically induced acoustic noise =

Type of audible sound

Electromagnetically induced acoustic noise, electromagnetically excited acoustic noise, or more commonly known as coil whine, is audible sound directly produced by materials vibrating under the excitation of electromagnetic forces. Some examples of this noise include the mains hum, hum of transformers, the whine of some rotating electric machines, or the buzz of fluorescent lamps.

Acoustic noise and vibrations due to electromagnetic forces can be seen as the reciprocal of microphonics, which describes how a mechanical vibration or acoustic noise can induce an undesired electrical perturbation.

== Related terms ==
The phenomenon is also called audible magnetic noise, electromagnetic acoustic noise, lamination vibration or electromagnetically induced acoustic noise, or more rarely, "coil noise" or "electrical noise".

The term "electromagnetic noise" is generally avoided as it is used in the field of electromagnetic compatibility and electromagnetic interference, dealing with radio frequencies. Electrical noise describes electrical perturbations occurring in electronic circuits, not sound.

The terms electromagnetic vibrations or magnetic vibrations, focusing on the structural phenomenon are less ambiguous.

The hissing of high voltage transmission lines is due to corona discharge, not magnetism.

== General explanation ==
Electromagnetic forces can be defined as forces arising from the presence of an electromagnetic field.

Electromagnetic forces in the presence of a magnetic field include equivalent forces due to Maxwell stress tensor, magnetostriction and Lorentz force (also called Laplace force). Maxwell forces, also called reluctances forces, are concentrated at the interface of high magnetic reluctivity changes, e.g. between air and a ferromagnetic material in electric machines; they are also responsible of the attraction or repulsion of two magnets facing each other. Magnetostriction forces are concentrated inside the ferromagnetic material itself. Lorentz or Laplace forces act on conductors plunged in an external magnetic field.

Equivalent electromagnetic forces due to the presence of an electrical field can involve electrostatic, electrostrictive and reverse piezoelectric effects.

These phenomena can potentially generate vibrations of the ferromagnetic, conductive parts, coils and permanent magnets of electrical, magnetic and electromechanical device, resulting in an audible sound if the frequency of vibrations lies between 20 Hz and 20 kHz, and if the sound level is high enough to be heard (e.g. large surface of radiation and large vibration levels). Vibration level is increased in case of a mechanical resonance, when electromagnetic forces match with a structural mode natural frequency of the active component (magnetic circuit, electromagnetic coil or electrical circuit) or of its enclosure.

The frequency of the noise depends on the nature of electromagnetic forces (quadratic or linear function of electrical field or magnetic field) and on the frequency content of the electromagnetic field (in particular if a DC component is present or not).

== Occurrence ==
=== In electric machines ===
Electromagnetic torque, which can be calculated as the average value of the Maxwell stress tensor along the airgap, is one consequence of electromagnetic forces in electric machines. As a static force, it does not create vibrations nor acoustic noise. However torque ripple (also called cogging torque for permanent magnet synchronous machines in open circuit), which represents the harmonic variations of electromagnetic torque, is a dynamic force creating torsional vibrations of both rotor and stator. The torsional deflection of a simple cylinder cannot radiate efficiently acoustic noise, but with particular boundary conditions the stator can radiate acoustic noise under torque ripple excitation. Structure-borne noise can also be generated by torque ripple when rotor shaft line vibrations propagate to the frame and shaft line.

Some tangential magnetic force harmonics can directly create magnetic vibrations and acoustic noise when applied to the stator teeth: tangential forces create a bending moment of the stator teeth, resulting in radial vibrations of the yoke.

Besides tangential force harmonics, Maxwell stress also includes radial force harmonics responsible for radial vibrations of the yoke, which in turn can radiate acoustic noise.

=== In passive components ===
==== Inductors ====
In inductors, also called reactors or chokes, magnetic energy is stored in the airgap of the magnetic circuit, where large Maxwell forces apply. Resulting noise and vibrations depend on airgap material and magnetic circuit geometry.

==== Transformers ====
In transformers magnetic noise and vibrations are generated by several phenomena depending on the load case which include Lorentz force on the windings, Maxwell forces in the joints of the laminations, and magnetostriction inside the laminated core.

==== Capacitors ====
Capacitors are also subject to large electrostatic forces. When the capacitor voltage/current waveform is not constant and contains time harmonics, some harmonic electric forces appear and acoustic noise can be generated. Ferroelectric capacitors also exhibit a piezoelectric effect that can be source of audible noise. This phenomenon is known as the "singing capacitor" effect.

=== Resonance effect in electrical machines ===
In radial flux rotating electric machines, resonance due to electromagnetic forces is particular as it occurs at two conditions: there must be a match between the exciting Maxwell force and the stator or rotor natural frequency, and between the stator or rotor modal shape and the exciting Maxwell harmonic wavenumber (periodicity of the force along the airgap).

Example of modal shape number 2 of a stator; movements have been exaggerated for presentation purposes

As an example a resonance with the elliptical modal shape of the stator can occur if the force wavenumber is 2. Under resonance conditions, the maxima of the electromagnetic excitation along the airgap and the maxima of the modal shape displacement are in phase.

== Modeling ==
=== Analytical approach ===
Based on rotating magnet field theory, the air-gap flux density of multiphase electrical machines can be expressed by a series over all spatial harmonics, assuming only the fundamental time harmonic of phase currents as well as the winding distribution and connection in slots. Considering the periodic characteristic of winding factors, the type of winding and rotor (reaction), as well as the number of slots and pole pairs, provide the main characteristics required for this analysis.

Considering the time harmonics of phase currents of synchronous and induction machines due to the pulse width modulation, the radial and tangential forces in the air gap can be characterized for individual pairs of time and spatial harmonics. Based on the Maxwell stress tensor, the force density can be related to the air-gap flux density with the respective series over time and spatial harmoncis. Accordingly, the main sidebands in a Campbell diagram of vibration and acoustic noise over frequency-speed axes can be rooted back to individual pairs of air-gap spatial and time harmonics, whereby the dominant components can be related to the considerable winding factors.

=== Numerical simulation ===
The simulation of electromagnetically induced noise and vibrations is a multiphysic modeling process carried in three steps:

- calculation of the electromagnetic forces
- calculation of the resulting magnetic vibrations
- calculation of the resulting magnetic noise

It is generally considered as a weakly coupled problem: the deformation of the structure under electromagnetic forces is assumed not to change significantly the electromagnetic field distribution and the resulting electromagnetic stress.

The assessment of audible magnetic noise in electrical machines can be done using three methods:

- using dedicated electromagnetic and vibro-acoustic simulation software (e.g. MANATEE)
- using electromagnetic (e.g. Flux, Jmag, Maxwell, Opera), structural (e.g. Ansys Mechanical, Nastran, Optistruct) and acoustic (e.g. Actran, LMS, Sysnoise) numerical software together with dedicated coupling methods
- using multiphysics numerical simulation software environment (e.g. Comsol Multiphysics, Ansys Workbench)

== Examples of affected devices ==
=== Static devices ===
Static devices include electrical systems and components used in electric power storage or power conversion such as

- inductors
- transformers
- power inverters
- capacitors
- resistors: the braking resistors of electric trains, used to dissipate electrical power when the catenary is not receptive during braking, can make electromagnetically induced acoustic noise
- coils: in magnetic resonance imaging, "coil noise" is that part of total system noise attributed to the receiving coil, due to its non-zero temperature.

=== Rotating devices ===
Rotating devices include radial and axial flux rotating electric machines used for electrical to mechanical power conversion such as

- induction motors
- synchronous motors with permanent magnets or DC wound rotor
- switched reluctance motors

In such device, dynamic electromagnetic forces come from variations of magnetic field, which either comes from a steady AC winding or a rotating DC field source (permanent magnet or DC winding).

== Sources ==
The harmonic electromagnetic forces responsible for magnetic noise and vibrations in a healthy machine can come from

- Pulse-width modulation supply of the machine
- slotting effects
- magnetic saturation

In a faulty machine, additional noise and vibrations due to electromagnetic forces can come from

- mechanical static and dynamic eccentricities
- uneven air-gap
- demagnetization
- short circuits
- missing magnetic wedges

Unbalanced Magnetic Pull (UMP) describes the electromagnetic equivalence of mechanical rotating unbalance: if electromagnetic forces are not balanced, a non-zero net magnetic force appears on stator and rotor. This force can excite the bending mode of the rotor and create additional vibration and noise.

== Reduction ==
=== Reduction of magnetic noise and vibrations in electric machines ===
NVH mitigation techniques in electrical machines include

- reducing the magnitude of electromagnetic excitations, independently of the structural response of the electrical machine
- reducing the magnitude of the structural response, independently of the electromagnetic excitations
- reducing the resonances occurring between electromagnetic excitations and structural modes

Electromagnetic noise and vibration mitigation techniques in electrical machines include:

- choosing the right slot/pole combination and winding design
- avoiding resonances match between stator and electromagnetic excitations
- skewing the stator or the rotor
- implementing pole shaping / pole shifting / pole pairing techniques
- implementing harmonic current injection or spread spectrum PWM strategies
- using notches / flux barriers on the stator or the rotor
- increasing damping
- increasing the frequency outside the audible frequency range

=== Reduction of "coil noise" ===
Coil noise mitigation actions include:

- add some glue (e.g. a layer of glue is often added on the top of television coils; over the years, this glue degrades and the sound level increases)
- change the shape of the coil (e.g. change coil shape to a figure eight rather than a traditional coil shape)
- isolate the coil from the rest of the device to minimize structure-borne noise
- increase damping

== Gallery ==
Deflection of a ferromagnetic cylinder due to a rotating permanent magnet excitation field

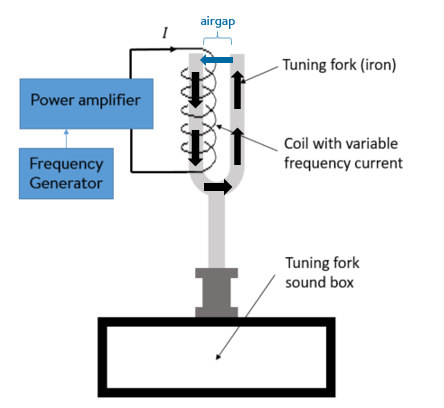
Set-up of the electromagnetically excited tuning fork

A varying electromagnetic force can be produced either by a moving source of DC magnetic field (e.g. rotating permanent magnet or rotating coil supplied with DC current), or by a steady source of AC magnetic field (e.g. a coil fed by a variable current).

=== Forced vibration by a rotating permanent magnet ===
This animation illustrates how a ferromagnetic sheet can be deformed due to the magnetic field of a rotating magnet. It corresponds to an ideal one pole pair permanent magnet synchronous machine with a slotless stator.

=== Acoustic resonance by a variable frequency coil ===
The resonance effect of magnetic vibration with a structural mode can be illustrated using a tuning fork made of iron. A prong of the tuning fork is wound with a coil fed by a variable frequency power supply. A variable flux density circulates between the two prongs and some dynamic magnetic forces appear between the two prongs at twice the supply frequency. When the exciting force frequency matches the fundamental mode of the tuning fork close to 400 Hz, a strong acoustic resonance occurs.

=== Audio of PMSM motor (traction application) ===
Example of magnetic noise coming from a subway electric motor
