= Wsród nocnej ciszy (film) =

Wśród nocnej ciszy
- Directed by: Tadeusz Chmielewski
- Written by: Tadeusz Chmielewski based on the novel Příběh kriminálního rady by Ladislav Fuks
- Produced by: Andrzej Wajda
- Starring: Tomasz Zaliwski; Piotr Lysak; Henryk Bista
- Cinematography: Jerzy Stawicki
- Edited by: Maria Orlowska
- Music by: Jerzy Matuszkiewicz
- Production company: Zespól Filmowy "X"
- Release date: 17 November 1978
- Running time: 128 minutes
- Country: Poland
- Language: Polish

Wśród nocnej ciszy is a Polish motion picture directed by Tadeusz Chmielewski and released in 1978. The screenplay, by Chmielewski, is based on the 1971 novel Příběh kriminálního rady by Ladislav Fuks.
