= Slaff =

Slaff is a surname. Notable people with the surname include:

- Craig Slaff (born 1983), American artist
- Jonathan Slaff (born 1950), American theater publicist
