= Pan Theodor Mundstock =

1963 novel by Ladislav Fuks

Pan Theodor Mundstock (Mr. Theodore Mundstock) is the debut novel by Czech author Ladislav Fuks, first published in 1963. The English translation by Iris Urwin was published by Orion Press, New York, in 1968.

It tells the story of a Jew in Prague in 1942, during the German occupation of Czechoslovakia, who is waiting to be deported to the concentration camps but trying to maintain as normal an existence as possible. When the occupying Nazis force him to leave the rope shop he owns, Mundstock's psyche starts to crack. Seeing the camps as inevitable, he starts practising for life in them.

== Publication ==
Fuks completed the novel in summer 1961 but it was not published until 1963 because early readers of the manuscript were critical of it. It was described variously as verbose, depressing and overly given to mysticism. It was published on the recommendation of Ivan Klíma.

== Reception ==
On its publication in 1963, Pan Theodor Mundstock was met with "universal critical acclaim". It was also well received in translation.

In a review for The New York Times, Richard M. Elman described the book as "brilliant" and said of it that "Ladislav Fuks's novel is not just another pious Holocaust book; it is acute, unsentimental, and unsparing, a work of intricate but compassionate narrative art, as if Kafka's K had literally confronted the crematoria." He highlighted how Mundstock's attempts to keep up a normal life "makes the trap he is in all the more absolute and terrifying" and praised the book both for the quality of its translation and the way "its artfulness, though always functional, is never permitted to victimize the humanity of Mundstock".

Webster Schott in Life magazine called it "one of literature's near miracles" and "excruciatingly poignant, clear and hard as diamonds in its English translation by Iris Urwin", saying that it "catapults Ladislav Fuks, Mundstock's 44-year-old Czech creator, into the first rank of contemporary literary moralists."

== Adaptations ==
Pan Theodor Mundstock was adapted for the stage as Mr. M in 2011 by Vít Hořejš. It was performed by The Czechoslovak-American Marionette Theatre at Theater for the New City and JCC Manhattan. The name is an allusion to K in Franz Kafka's unfinished novel The Castle.

In 2016, a Czech language stage adaptation written by Miloš Horanský and starring Vojtěch Dyk as Mundstock was performed at the Veletržní Palác, part of the National Gallery in Prague. The adaptation was praised for its performances but criticised by some critics for straying from the novel in its characterisation.

== Translations ==
- Mundstock úr: regény (Budapest, 1965)
- Señor Theodor Mundstock (1965)
- Pan Teodor Mundstock (Warsaw, 1966)
- Herr Theodor Mundstock (Berlin: Rütten und Loenig, 1966)
- Herra Theodor Mundstock (Helsinki, 1970)
- Meneer Theodor Mundstock ('s Gravenhage, 1986)
- Gospodin Theodor Mundstock (Zagreb, 1988)
- Il signor Theodor Mundstock (Torino: Einaudi, 1997)
- Monsieur Mundstock: le porteur d'étoile (Éditions Cascade, 2004)
