= Klima =

Klíma is a surname, an Anglicised and Germanised form of the Czech surname Klíma. Notable people with the surname include:

- Edward Klima (1931–2008), American linguist
- Johann Klima (1900–1945), Austrian footballer
- John Klima (artist) (born 1965), American new media artist
- John Klima (editor) (born 1971), American science fiction magazine editor
- Martha Scanlan Klima (1938–2025), American politician
- Mita Klima (1893–1945), Austrian tennis player
- Viktor Klima (born 1947), Austrian politician and businessman

== See also ==
- Klima, Milos, a village in Greece
