= Lukáš Klíma =

Lukáš Klíma can mean:

- Lukáš Klíma (ice hockey) (born 1990), Czech ice hockey player
- Lukáš Klíma (curler) (born 1991), Czech curler
