= Mundstock =

Mundstock is a surname and may refer to:

- Marcos Mundstock (1942–2020), Argentinian comedian
- Pan Theodor Mundstock, title character in a novel by Ladislav Fuks
