= Pasáček z doliny =

- Movie poster
- Directed by: František Vláčil
- Written by: Jiří Křižan
- Starring: Vlastimil Drbal; Josef Kemr
- Cinematography: František Uldrich
- Edited by: Miroslav Hájek
- Music by: Milan Dvořák
- Distributed by: Ústřední půjčovna filmů
- Release date: 1 March 1984
- Running time: 90 min
- Country: Czechoslovakia
- Language: Czech

Pasáček z doliny (English: The Little Shepherd Boy from the Valley) is a 1984 Czechoslovak film. The film starred Vlastimil Drbal and Josef Kemr. It was based on a novel by Ladislav Fuks.

== Cast ==
- Vlastimil Drbal as The Little Shepherd
- Josef Kemr as the grandfather
- Libuše Geprtová as the mother
- Radka Fidlerová as publican's wife
- Bronislav Poloczek as Gamekeeper
- Jiří Schmitzer as Králík
- Vlastimil Zavřel as Lojzek
- Jiří Štěpnička as Blondýn
- Ilja Prachař as Mayor
- Václav Sloup as Publican

== Plot ==
The film is set in 1947 Beskydy. It follows a 10-year-old boy who regularly shepherds cows next to a destroyed German tank. His grandfather usually looks after him because the boy doesn't have a father and mother has to work. One evening, he meets two mysterious persons. He thinks it is a king of slapsticks with his scribe. They are in fact members of Ukrainian Insurgent Army who plan to plunder the village.

== Reception ==
The film has won an award in Bánská Bystrica for artistic execution.
