= Klima, Milos =

Klima Κλήμα
- Settlement
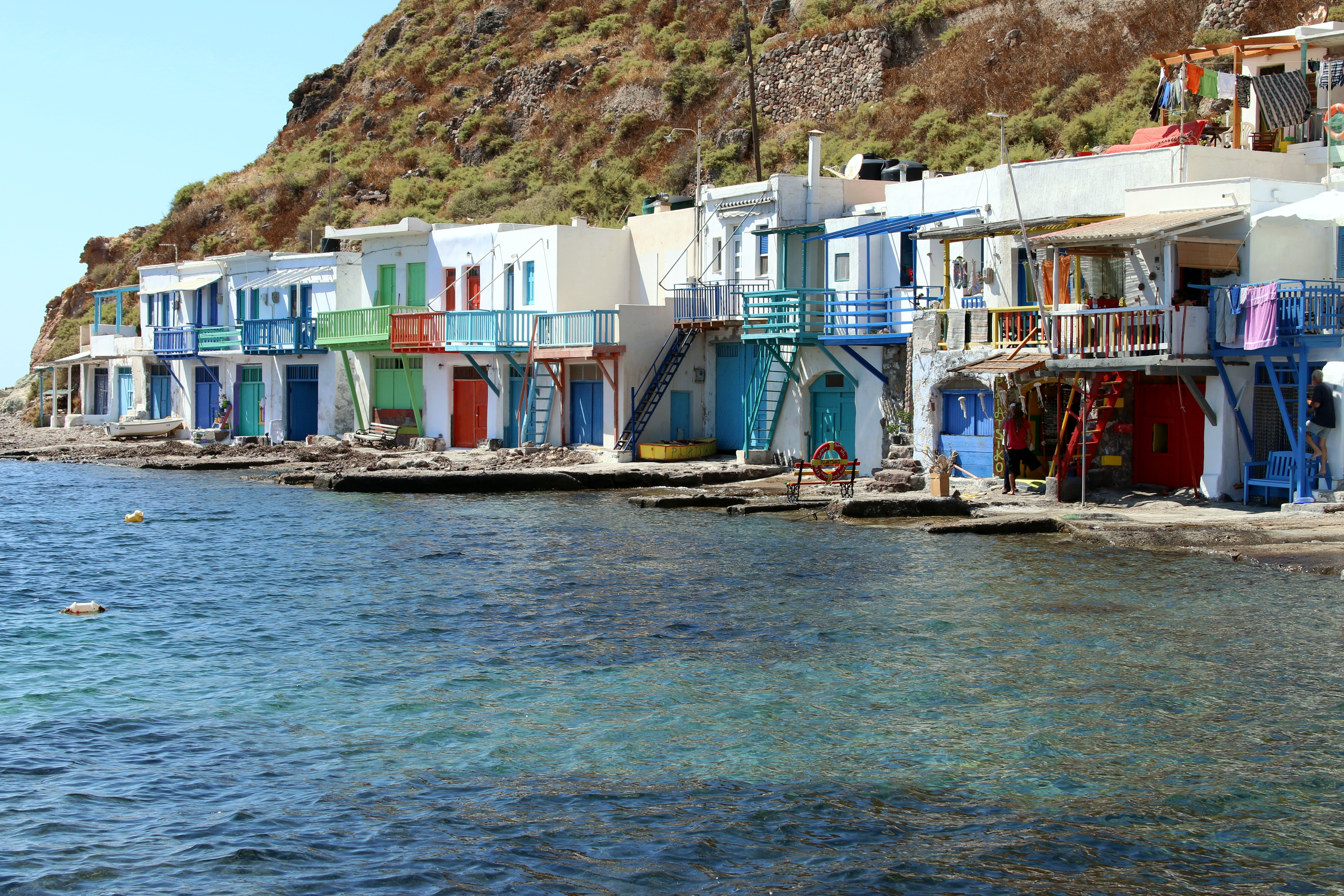
- Country: Greece
- Administrative region: South Aegean
- Regional unit: Milos
- Municipality: Milos
- Community: Trypiti

Population (2021)
  - Total: 8
- Time zone: UTC+2 (EET)
  - Summer (DST): UTC+3 (EEST)

Klima is a seaside village of Milos, Cyclades, Greece. According to the 2021 Greek census it had 8 residents.

The village is known for its traditional fishermen houses called syrmata (wires). They are two-store houses with the first floor being used by the fisherman's family to live and the ground floor being used to store the boat during winter. These houses usually have colorfully painted doors and windows. Nowadays some are used as tourist accommodations.

Klima is near the location of ancient Milos and its theater[el], and near the location where Venus de Milo was found.
