= Příběh kriminálního rady =

1971 novel by Ladislav Fuks

- Author: Ladislav Fuks
- Language: Czech
- Publisher: Československý spisovatel
- Publication date: 1971

Příběh kriminálního rady (“The Story of a Police Commissioner”) is a Czech crime novel by Ladislav Fuks. The protagonist, Viki, is a teenage boy raised by his despotic father, Police Commissioner Heumann. The novel takes place in the capitol of an unnamed Western European state. It was first published in 1971. It has been translated into Hungarian, Polish and Romanian.

The 1978 Polish film Wśród nocnej ciszy, written and directed by Tadeusz Chmielewski, was adapted from the novel. In 1994, it was adapted into a Czech television film of the same name, directed by Dušan Klein and with a screenplay by Bohumila Zelenkovál. Czech Radio released an abridged audiobook version in 2013.

== Plot ==
Teenage boy Viki Heumann felt isolated and abandoned at home. His mother died when he was a child, and he has been raised solely by his father, the Chief Police Commissioner, a cold, demanding man and an advocate against the abolition of the death penalty.

Commissioner Heumann is investigating the unsolved murders of two young children, both occurring in villages just outside of the city. Viki, observing his father's efforts, believes his father is struggling to solve the case, and, in an effort to prove his worth to his father, decides to investigate the homicides himself.

During this time, Viki and his boyfriend, Barry, are planning for an adventurous trip to Turkey next summer. One day, Viki comes home late, and his father forbids him from going on the trip. The Heumann family butler, a man Viki respects, advises Viki against trying to solve the murders alone. Later, a third child is murdered, and public pressure mounts. If the Commissioner fails to solve the cases quickly, he will be forced to resign from his position.

Suddenly, the Commissioner rescinds his decision, allowing Viki go to Turkey. He offers to give his son a ride. On the drive, the Commissioner explains that the murderer is to be caught in the fields on the outskirts of the city, telling Vicki that he will at least see the closure to the case he was so interested in. Once in the deserted countryside, the Commissioner shoots his son in the back of the head, shedding a mournful tear for the first time since he was a child.

At the end of the story, the Commissioner catches the perpetrator, a man named Brikcius, who is killed during questioning, thus closing the case. Only Commissioner Heumann and one of his colleagues know the truth: that while Brikcius did murder the first two children, and would therefore have received the death penalty had he not been killed during questioning, the third murder was committed by Viki as an intentional red herring. In an act of revenge against his father, he hoped to make the murders unsolvable so that the Commissioner would lose his position, breaking his spirit. When the Commissioner executed his son, he was punishing him for his crime, doing so extrajudicially to protect the memory and reputation of his son.

== Genre ==
The novel is often described as detective fiction, and while there is a crime at the beginning of the novel and a reveal of the perpetrator at the end, the investigative work by which Brikcius and Viki were discovered is not revealed to the reader and is not essential to the story. The primary emphasis of the novel is on the fractured relationship between father and son, and the power the Commissioner wields in his near-absolute authority, particularly the death penalty.
