= Winding factor =

In power engineering, winding factor $k_w$ provides a way to compare of the effectiveness of different designs of stators for alternators. "The winding factor is an operand in order to consider the effect of winding distribution and chording on the spatial distribution of the magnetic field in the air gap of synchronous and induction machines". Accordingly, the behaviour of synchronous and induction machines can be estimated. "The main torque production or electrical power generation can easily be related to the fundamental spatial and time harmonics, whereby the effect of other spatial and time harmonics is usually negligible. Indeed, the other spatial and time harmonics may contribute to the torque pulsation, noise, and vibration excitations" besides additional losses.

For most alternators, the stator acts as the armature.

Practical alternators have a short-pitched and distributed windings to reduce harmonics and maintain constant torque. Also, either the stator or rotor may be slightly skewed from the rotor's axis to reduce torque ripple. The armature winding of each phase may be distributed in a number of slots for certain number of pole pairs. Since the EMF induced in different slots are not in phase, their phasor sum is less than their numerical sum. This reduction factor is called distribution factor $k_d$. The other factors that can reduce the winding factor are pitch factor $k_p$ and skew factor $k_s$.

== Pitch ==
In alternator design, pitch means angle. The shaft makes a complete rotation in 360 degrees, and is called mechanical degrees. However, the current in a conductors makes a complete cycle in 360 electrical degrees. Electrical degrees and mechanical degrees are related as follows:

$$\text{electrical degrees} = \frac{P }{2}\cdot \text{mechanical degrees}$$

where $P$ is the number of poles. Note that in many considerations such as the closed-form distribution factor, $p$ refers to the number of pole pairs, i.e., $p=\frac{1}{2}\cdot P$.

No matter how many poles, each pole always spans exactly 180 electrical degrees, and it is called pole pitch. Coil pitch is the number of electrical degrees spanned by the coil.

=== Short pitch factor ===
A full-pitched coil is 180 electrical degrees, meaning it spans the entire pole. A short-pitched coil is less than 180 electrical degrees, meaning it does not spans the entire pole. The amount the coil is short-pitched is given by the variable $a$ in electrical degrees:

$a = \text{pole pitch} - \text{coil pitch}$, and the pitch factor is:

$k_p = \cos(\frac{a}{2})$.

A short pitched coil is also called chorded, in reference to the chord of a circle.

== Calculating winding factor ==
The winding factor is defined by the product of the distribution and pitch factors
$k_w = k_d k_p$

while the coupling factor can be calculated as
$k_w = k_d k_p k_s$

where
$k_d$ is the distribution factor.
$k_p$ is the pitch factor.
$k_s$ is the skew factor resulting from skewing between the stator and rotor.

== Example ==
For a 3-phase 6 slot 4 pole non-overlapping winding alternator:
$\text{coil pitch} = \frac{2 \pi}{6} = \frac{\pi}{3} (\text{mech}) = \frac{2 \pi}{3} (\text{elec})$
$\text{pole pitch} = \frac{2 \pi}{4} = \frac{\pi}{2} (\text{mech}) = \pi (\text{elec})$

Most of 3-phase motors have winding factor values between 0.85 and 0.95.

The winding factor (along with some other factors like winding skew) can help to improve the harmonic content in the generated EMF of the machine.
