= Jiří Křižan =

Czech scriptwriter, writer and university educator (1941–2010)

- Born: 26 October 1941; Valašské Meziříčí, Protectorate of Bohemia and Moravia
- Died: 13 October 2010 (aged 68); Branky, Czech Republic
- Occupations: Screenwriter and writer
- Years active: 1965–2010

Jiří Křižan (26 October 1941 – 13 October 2010) was a Czech screenwriter, writer and politician.

== Life ==
Křižan grew up in Moravian Wallachia. His father – a lumber mill company owner before 1948 nationalization – was arrested and executed by the Communists in a show trial in 1951. Křižan was expelled from high school for mocking the death of Czechoslovak Communist president Antonín Zápotocký. He had to work as a manual labourer until he was hired as a technical writer in a daily newspaper. His first produced screenplay was Horký vzduch in 1965. He was allowed to study at FAMU from 1965 to 1970. In 1971 he wrote an autobiographical novel Exercicia which he later adapted into the screenplay for the movie Tichá bolest. In 1981 Křižan refused the Klement Gottwald National Prize for his screenplay to the movie Signum Laudis.

== Politics ==
Křižan was active in Charter 77 since 1986. In 1989 he co-wrote the petition Několik vět with Václav Havel, Stanislav Devátý and Alexander Vondra. He was a founding member of Civic Forum and after the Velvet Revolution he worked as an adviser to President Havel. From 1992 to 1995 he was a Deputy Minister of the Interior.

== Selected filmography ==
- Shadows of a Hot Summer (1977)
- Signum Laudis (1980)
- Pasáček z doliny (1983)
- Tichá bolest (1990)
- Sekal Has to Die (1988)
- Of Parents and Children (2007)
