= Branky =

- Municipality
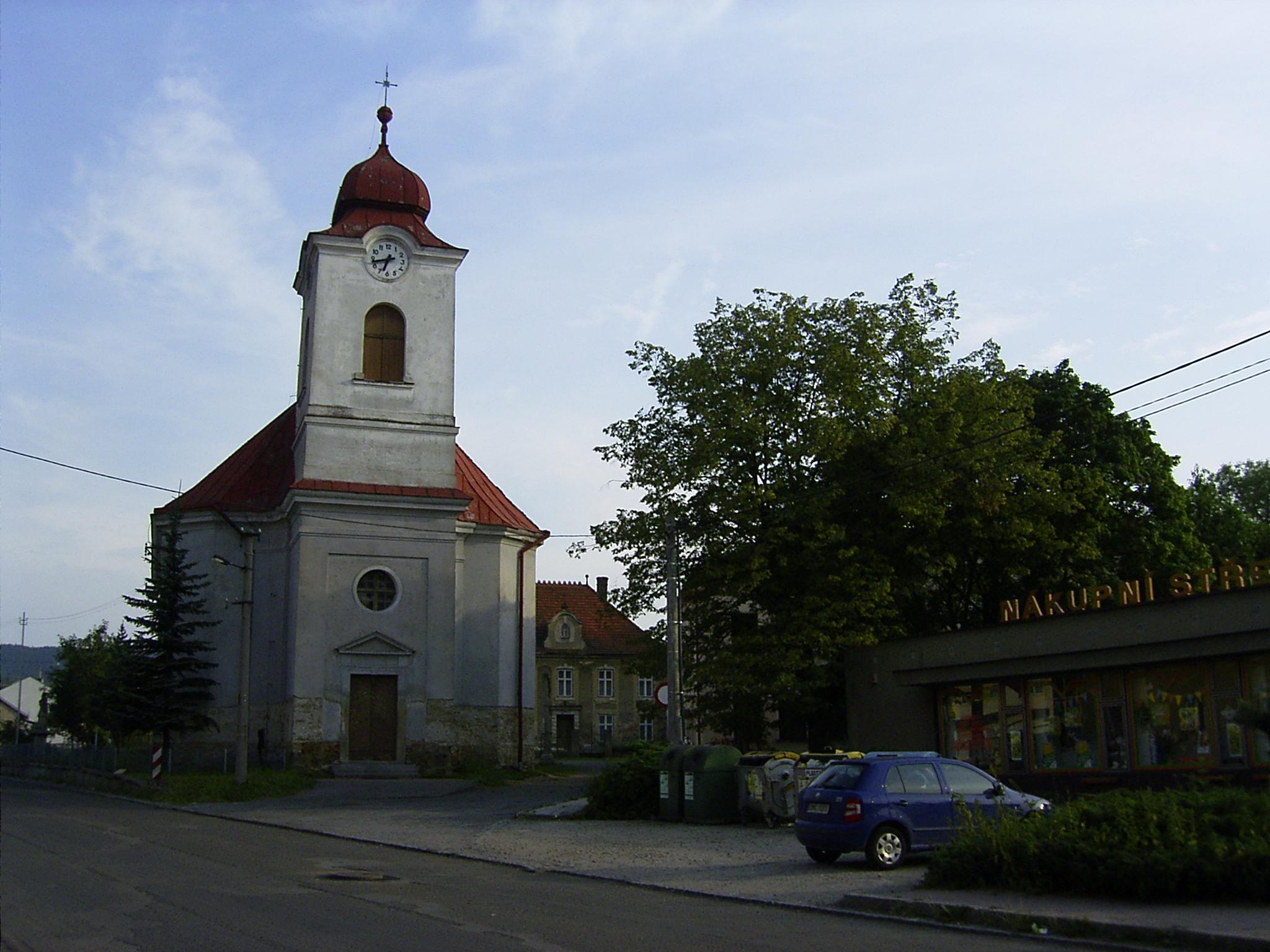
- Church of the Immaculate Conception of the Virgin Mary

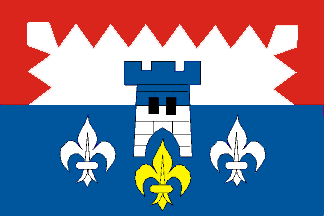
- Flag Coat of arms

- Location in the Czech Republic
- Coordinates: 49°27′39″N 17°53′35″E
- Country: Czech Republic
- Region: Zlín
- District: Vsetín
- First mentioned: 1270

Area
  - Total: 10.77 km^{2} (4.16 sq mi)
- Elevation: 327 m (1,073 ft)

Population (2026-01-01)
  - Total: 1,029
  - Density: 95.54/km^{2} (247.5/sq mi)
- Time zone: UTC+1 (CET)
  - Summer (DST): UTC+2 (CEST)
- Postal code: 756 45
- Website: www.obecbranky.cz

Branky is a municipality and village in Vsetín District in the Zlín Region of the Czech Republic. It has about 1,000 inhabitants.

Branky lies approximately 16 kilometres (10 mi) north-west of Vsetín, 30 km (19 mi) north-east of Zlín, and 260 km (160 mi) east of Prague.

== Demographics ==
Historical population
| Year | Pop. | ±% |
|---|---|---|
| 1869 | 875 | — |
| 1880 | 848 | −3.1% |
| 1890 | 955 | +12.6% |
| 1900 | 918 | −3.9% |
| 1910 | 859 | −6.4% |
| 1921 | 850 | −1.0% |
| 1930 | 877 | +3.2% |
| 1950 | 895 | +2.1% |
| 1961 | 1,013 | +13.2% |
| 1970 | 951 | −6.1% |
| 1980 | 882 | −7.3% |
| 1991 | 803 | −9.0% |
| 2001 | 857 | +6.7% |
| 2011 | 903 | +5.4% |
| 2021 | 972 | +7.6% |
Source: Censuses

== Notable people ==
- Jiří Křižan (1941–2010), screenwriter, writer and politician
