= Catacombs of Milos =

Ancient Greece: Christian catacombs on Milos, Greece

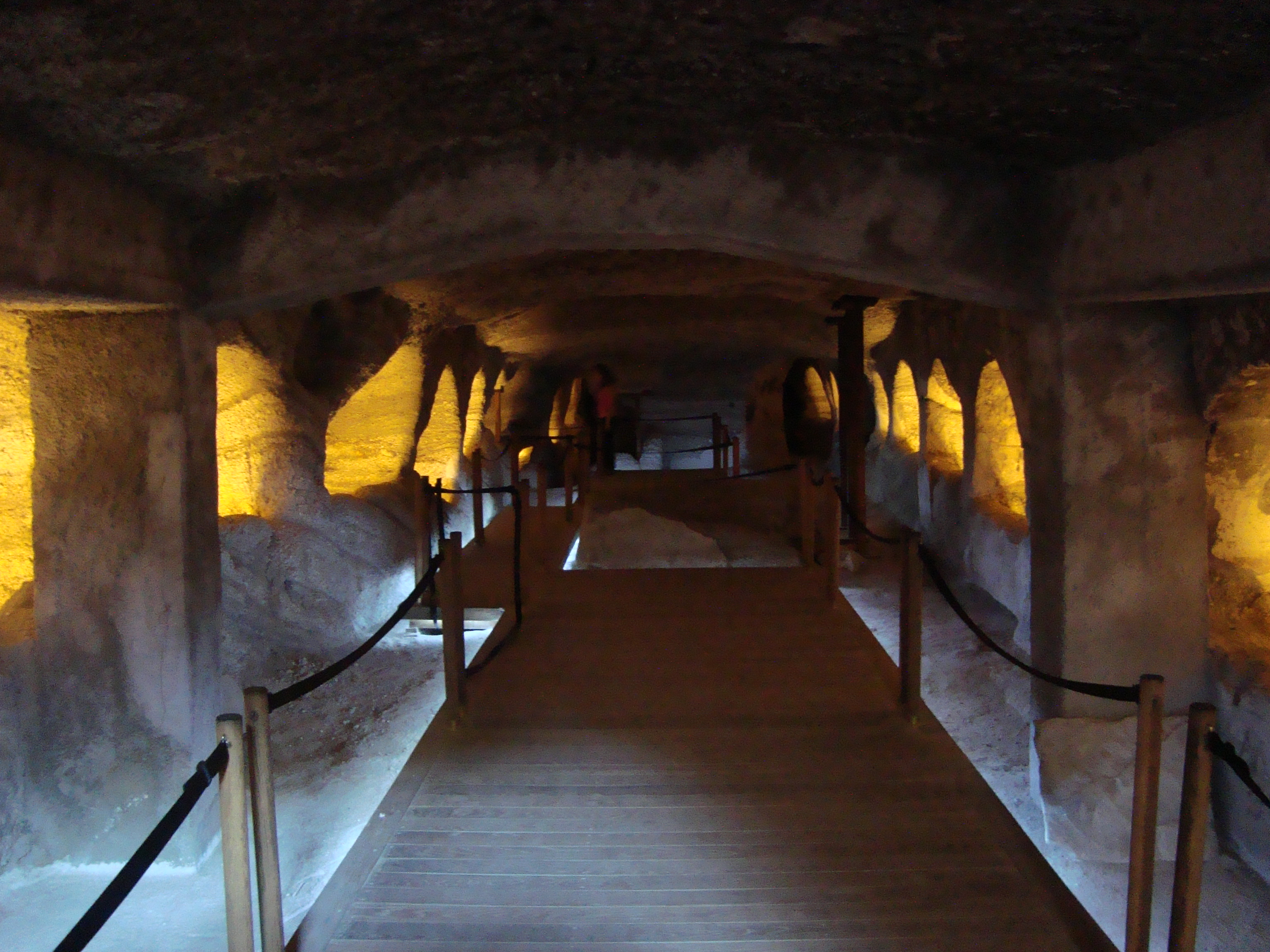
The Main Hall of the catacombs.

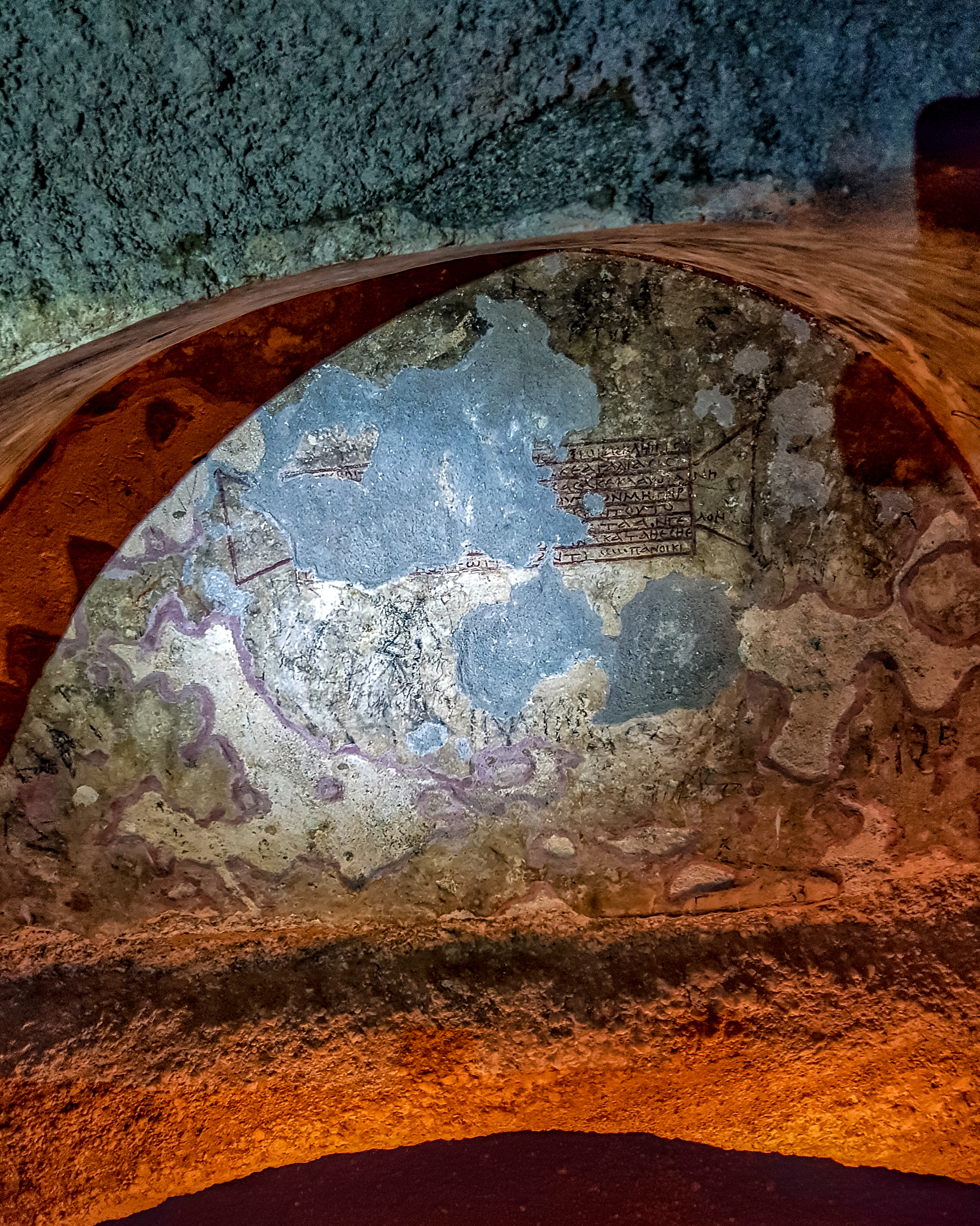
An inscription on a tomb

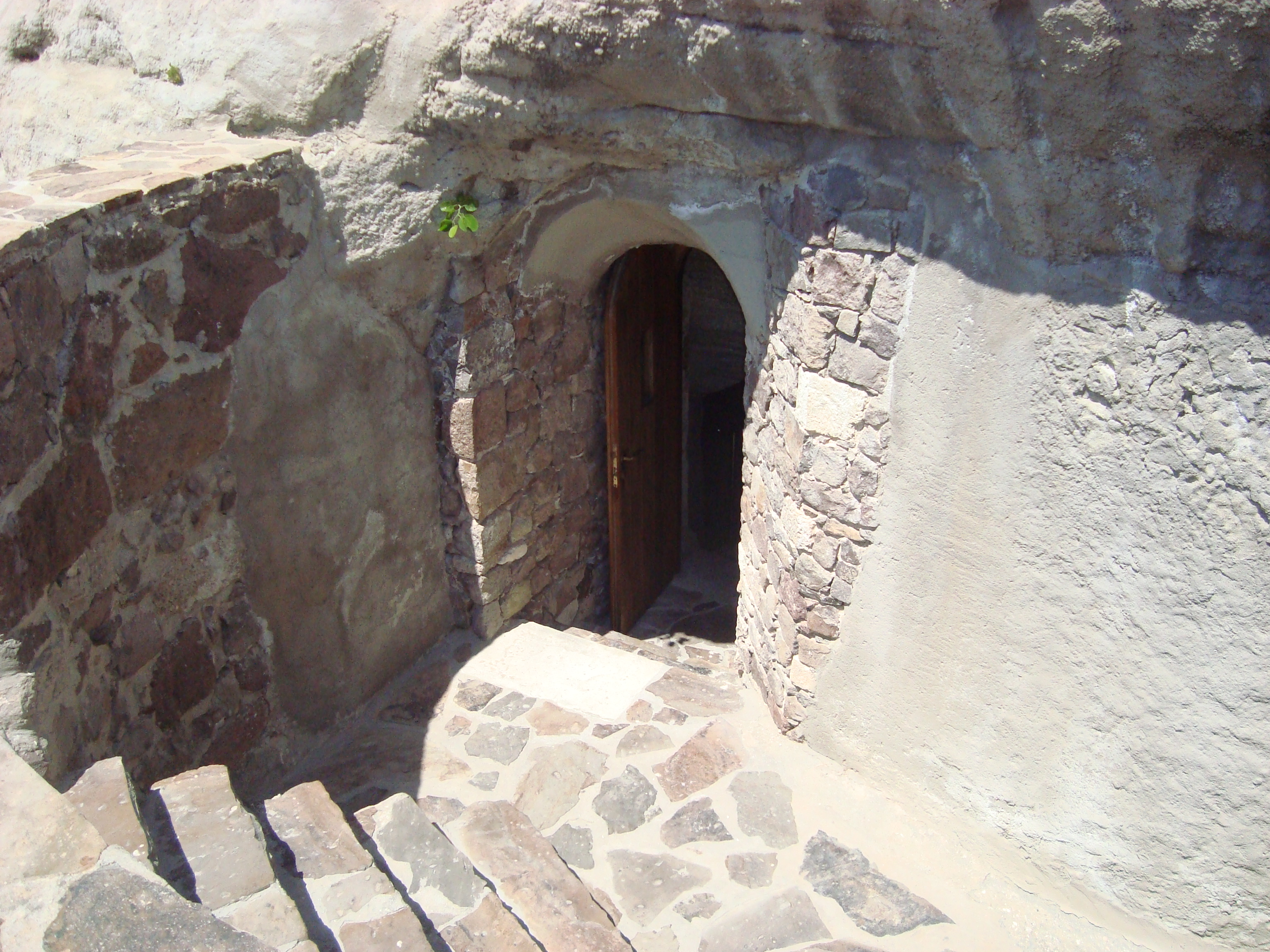
The entrance.

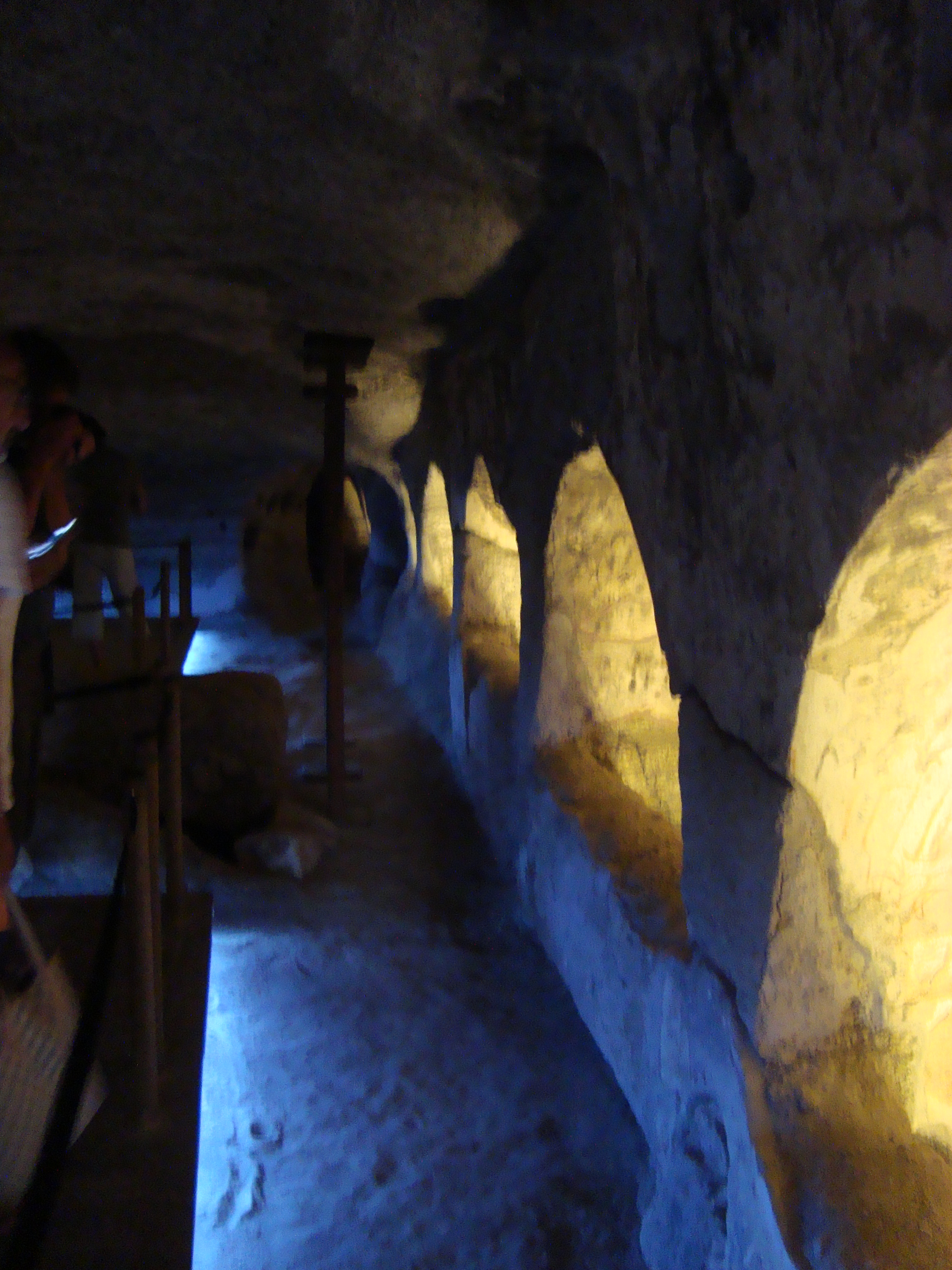
Catacombs.

The Catacombs of Milos are an ancient underground Christian cemetery located on the island of Milos in the Cyclades, Greece, dating to the 1st-5th century AD.

The catacombs are found near the modern settlement of Trypiti, next to the site of the agora of the ancient city of Melos and 200 m to the east of the ancient theatre. The name Trypiti (Τρυπητή, "made with holes [τρύπες]") derives from the fact that the surrounding area is full of caves cut into the porous volcanic rock, which are still used by the inhabitants as storerooms and stables. In ancient times, these caves were used as family burial chambers. The galleries are of differing widths, ranging from 1 to 5 metres in width and from 1.6 to 2.5 metres in height. In addition to the tombs cut into the walls, there are also many graves cut into the ground and covered with unworked stones of irregular sizes. It is underground.
