= Jonathan Slaff =

American theater publicist

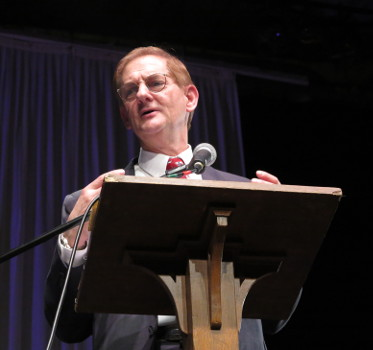
Jonathan Slaff

Jonathan Slaff (born 1950) is an American theater publicist specializing in new work and actor best known for comedic parts and appearances in television commercials.

He is also known for his surveys on the economic impact of the September 11 attacks for artists in New York City, conducted between 2002 and 2004.

== Life and career ==
Slaff was born and raised in Wilkes-Barre, Pennsylvania. He was exposed to theater throughout his life and made his professional acting debut as a child actor in South Pacific with the Kenley Players in Columbus, Ohio in 1962.

He graduated from Yale University with a bachelor's in American studies, then from Columbia Business School with an MBA in media management. He made his New York theatrical debut in 1976, appearing in a production of Calder Willingham's End as a Man directed by Garland Wright at the Lion Theatre Company.

Slaff began acting in television commercials in the late 1970s and early 1980s, appearing in Clio Award-winning campaigns for Federal Express and Wendy's directed by Joe Sedelmaier. Slaff appeared with Wendy's owner Dave Thomas in several commercials for the restaurant.

He began working as a theatrical press agent in 1988, specializing in new and international work. He was first a press agent for Theater for the New City, representing new works by playwrights including Romulus Linney, Maria Irene Fornes, Eduardo Machado, Rosalyn Drexler, Nilo Cruz, Bloolips, Spiderwoman Theater, and Crystal Field (artistic director of the theater). Slaff also provides photography services for his clients.

He then worked as a press agent for La MaMa Experimental Theatre Club from 1989 to 2005, representing works by artists including Tadeusz Kantor, Split Britches, John Kelly, Douglas Dunn, Dario D'Ambrosi, and David Sedaris. While at La MaMa, he represented revivals of Fragments of a Greek Trilogy directed by Andrei Serban with music by Elizabeth Swados and many new works by La MaMa's founder and artistic director, Ellen Stewart. He also introduced Blue Man Group in the La MaMa production of Blue Man Group's "Tubes" in 1991. The production transferred to off-Broadway at the Astor Place Theatre, and is now one of New York's longest-running and successful productions.

Slaff has also represented The American Place Theatre, Bread and Puppet Theater, Jean Cocteau Repertory, The Czechoslovak-American Marionette Theatre, Klezmer Conservatory Band, Klezmer Mountain Boys, New Federal Theatre, The Negro Ensemble Company, Inc., Shakespeare in the Parking Lot, and Ubu Repertory Theater.

Beside theater, he has also done publicity for dance, classical music, and visual art. He has acted in television and film, and has appeared as a print model on the cover of National Lampoon.

== September 11 recovery surveys ==
Between 2002 and 2004, Slaff conducted and authored two research studies documenting the impact of the September 11 attacks on the arts sector and the livelihoods of individual artists, those both self-employed and employed by others. The surveys were distributed primarily through professional organizations and labor unions.

The first survey was conducted by the Government Outreach Committee of DowntownNYC! on behalf of the New York Foundation for the Arts, in conjunction with the Consortium For Worker Education. The second survey was conducted solely by DowntownNYC!

The surveys were the first attempt to assess the economic impact of September 11 on artists. This impact had been masked by other events until the survey results were released. The surveys revealed that the cultural sector was as severely affected as the travel and airline industries. Nevertheless, governmental and institutional recovery efforts had not contributed to the arts sector, and weaknesses in the cultural economy had caused some artists to start doing other work, and caused others to move elsewhere. The surveys inspired a series of later investigations into weaknesses in the arts and cultural economy in New York City.

== Personal life ==
Slaff lives in Greenwich Village with his family. He is married to actress Shirley Curtin and has a daughter named Julia.

== Selected credits ==
=== As an actor ===
- 1991: Futz by Rochelle Owens and directed by Tom O'Horgan, La MaMa Experimental Theatre Club
- 1990: Casa with Denise Stoklos, La MaMa Experimental Theatre Club
- 2010: Duet for Solo Voice by David Scott Milton and directed by Stanley Allan Sherman, Theater for the New City

=== As a print model ===
- National Lampoon, May 1982
