= Trypiti =

Town in Greece

Trypiti Τρυπητή
- Community
- Location within Greece
- Coordinates: 36°44′13″N 24°25′48″E
- Country: Greece
- Administrative region: South Aegean
- Regional unit: Milos
- Municipality: Milos

Population (2021)
  - Community: 766
- Time zone: UTC+2 (EET)
  - Summer (DST): UTC+3 (EEST)

Trypiti (Greek: Τρυπητή) is a small town in the island of Milos, Greece. Population 766 (2021). It is famous for being located next to the Milos Catacombs and the Roman theatre.
