= Signum Laudis =

- Film Poster
- Directed by: Martin Hollý
- Written by: Jiří Křižan
- Starring: Vlado Müller
- Cinematography: Vladimír Kalina
- Music by: Zdeněk Liška
- Production companies: Barrandov Studios; Slovenská filmová tvorba Bratislava
- Distributed by: Central Office of Film Distribution
- Release date: October 1, 1980
- Running time: 85 minutes
- Country: Czechoslovakia
- Languages: Czech; German

Signum Laudis is a 1980 Czechoslovak war drama film directed by Martin Hollý. It is set during World War I.

== Plot ==
The film is set on the Eastern Front of World War I. Corporal Hoferik becomes a commander of his unit after the commanding officers are killed. He leads his men to an attack that leads to high casualties. Hoferik and his men are then pulled out to the rear. Hoferik's unit is part of Ziegler's regiment. The regiment is visited by General Berger and his staff. Berger and his staff doesn't know much about life on the front. Berger awards Hoferik the Signum Laudis. Hoferik is happy and wants to celebrate with his men but they hate him for his eagerness and fanaticism. They decline. Next day the estate where Hoferik's unit reside surrounded by enemies. Berger orders the regiment to attack but it is decimated. Hoferik's unit and Berger's staff escapes the estate but old General Gross is killed in a fight with enemy. Soldiers are in a hopeless situation and officers want to surrender. Hoferik wants to fight to the last men which leads other officers to hold a court during which is Hoferik accused of Gross' murder and sentenced to death. Hoferik is executed. Officers then order the remaining soldiers to strike the enemy and they (the soldiers) are all killed. Officers meanwhile surrender to enemy.

== Cast ==
- Vlado Müller as Corporal Adalbert Hoferik
- Josef Bláha as Captain Bruno König
- Ilja Prachař as General Friedrich Berger
- Radovan Lukavský as General Friedrich Gross
- Jiří Kodet as First Lieutenant Kostolány
- Oldřich Velen as Colonel Reznitzek
- Ladislav Frej as Lieutenant Colonel Rudolf Ziegler
- Pavel Zedníček as Feldwebel J. A. Wimmer
- Miroslav Zounar as Lieutenant Hans von Pallawski
- Jan Skopeček as Reisch known as Father

== Reception ==
=== Accolades ===
Date of ceremony	Event	Award	Recipient(s)	Result	Ref(s)
1980	Karlovy Vary International Film Festival	Special Jury Award		Won	
1981	Czech and Slovak Film Festival Kladno	Award for music	Zdeněk Liška	Won	
1982	Klement Gottwald State Awards		State Award	Won	
1982	Film and Theatre Survey	The most popular actor	Vlado Müller	Won	
1990	Finále Plzeň Film Festival	Kingfisher ex aequo		Won	
