= Ladislav Fuks =

Czech writer (1923–1994)

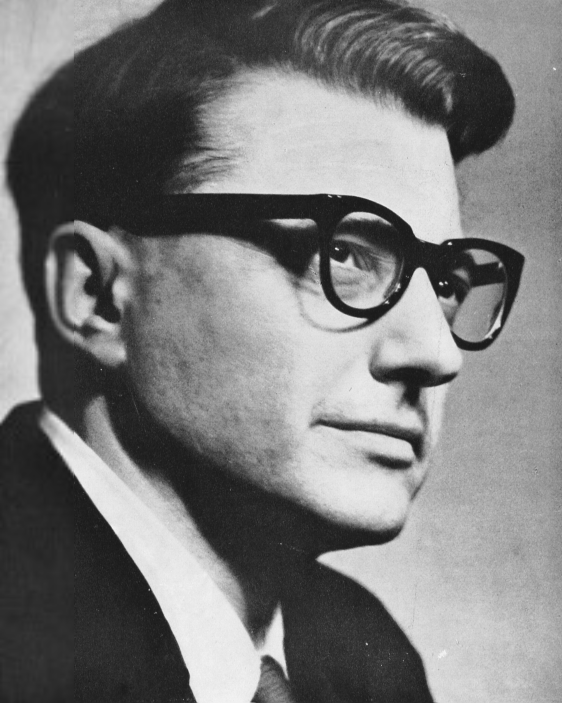
Fuks in 1966

Ladislav Fuks (24 September 1923 – 19 August 1994) was a Czech novelist. He focused mainly on psychological novels, portraying the despair and suffering of people under Nazi German occupation of Czechoslovakia. He was considered one of the most significant and inventive Czech fiction writers of his time.

== Life and career ==
Fuks was born in Prague on 24 September 1923, the son of Vaclav Fuks (a police officer) and Marie Frycková Fuksová. He studied the Gymnasium in Truhlářšká ulice, where he also first witnessed Nazi persecution of his Jewish friends. In 1942 he was forced to be a caretaker in Hodonín, as a part of the Arbeitseinsatz.

Later he studied philosophy, psychology and art history at the Philosophical faculty of Charles University in Prague, where, in 1949, he received a doctorate. After his studies, he was a member of the National heritage administration and after 1959 he worked in the national gallery. He became a professional writer in the 1960s. He attracted much attention with his debut work, Pan Theodor Mundstock (Mr. Theodore Mundstock), published in 1963, and a year later with his short story collection Mí černovlasí bratři (My dark-haired brothers).

During the communist period, Fuks said he "preferred to choose conciliatoriness and toleration over reckless defiance and courage to fall in the resistance" (raději volil smířlivost a toleranci před bezhlavým vzdorem a odvahou padnout v odporu). Some of his work from the 1970s is strongly linked to the era in which it was created; for example, Návrat z žitného pole (The Return from the Rye Field) is a novel targeted against emigration after the 1948 communist coup. He was also a member of the socialist Union of Czech Writers (Svaz českých spisovatelů). Although he obtained some international recognition, in the last years of his life he was left alone and friendless. He died on 19 August 1994 in his Prague apartment in the Dejvice neighborhood, at Národní obrany Street No. 15.

== List of works ==
- Zámek Kynžvart (Castle Kynžvart) – 1958: A professional study
- Pan Theodor Mundstock (Mr. Theodore Mundstock) – 1963: The story of a Prague Jew who is in constant fear of deportation to the concentration camp. He tries to prepare himself—he sleeps on a wooden plank, tortures himself with hunger, and carries heavy things. He also lives through frequent hallucinations and conversations with his own shadow.
- Mí černovlasí bratři (My dark-haired brothers) – 1964: The story of a boy who loses all his Jewish friends through the occupation—a collection of short stories, marking their individual fates.
- Variace pro temnou strunu (Variations for a dark string) – 1966: The story of the life before the occupation of Czechoslovakia by the Germans through the eyes of a small boy. Reality mixes into a blend with ideas from fairy tales, stories and rumors the young boy hears from their family servant.
- Spalovač mrtvol (Literally "The incinerator of corpses" or "The Cremator") – 1967: A psychological horror story about a worker in a crematorium, who, through the influence of Nazi propaganda and oriental philosophy, becomes a maniac, and murders his entire family to "cleanse them" by death. It was made into the 1969 film The Cremator with Rudolf Hrušínský as the main actor, co-written by Fuks and director Juraj Herz.
- Smrt morčete (The Death of a hamster) – 1969: A collection of 10 balladic short stories with Jewish motifs.
- Myši Natálie Mooshabrové (The mice of Natalia Mooshabr) – 1970
- Příběh kriminálního rady (The tale of a criminal counsel) – 1971
- Oslovení ze tmy (Addressing from the darkness) – 1972
- Nebožtíci na bále (The Deceased at a ball) – 1972
- Návrat z žitného pole (The return from the rye field) – 1974
- Mrtvý v podchodu (March of the dead) – 1976
- Pasáček z doliny (The (little) herdsman from the lowland) – 1977
- Křišťálový pantoflíček (The Crystal slipper) – 1978
- Obraz Martina Blaskowitze (The Picture of Martin Blaskowitz) – 1980
- Vévodkyně a kuchařka (The Duchess and the (female) cook) – 1983
- Cesta do zaslíbené země (Journey to the promised land) – 1991
- Moje zrcadlo (My mirror) – 1995: Memoirs, published posthumously
