= Love and Garbage =

Czech novel

Love and Garbage (Czech: Láska a smetí) is a 1986 novel by Czech writer Ivan Klíma.

== Publication ==
Banned from publishing in the Czechoslovakia while the country was under Soviet influence, but after the end of the cold war in 1989, the novel was rushed into print in his home country, selling over 100,000 copies.

== Synopsis ==
The novel uses a first person narrative to explore the suffering and challenges of a dissident artist forced to be a trash collector in Communist Prague. In particular, the novel explores how different people are connected to each other through human experience. To prepare for writing the novel, Klima actually spent a few days in a street sweeper role.

== Reception ==
The novel was the most successful of Klíma's books. Though the review by Eva Hoffman in the New York Times was mixed, she concludes that the novel "affords the experience, rare in today's fiction, of being in the presence of a seasoned, measured perspective, and a mind that strives honestly to arrive at a wisdom sufficient to our common condition."

== Further sources ==
- A Reflection on the Novel by Philip Roth
- An Interview in French with Klíma about the novel in 1992
