= Rakvička =

Traditional Czech desert

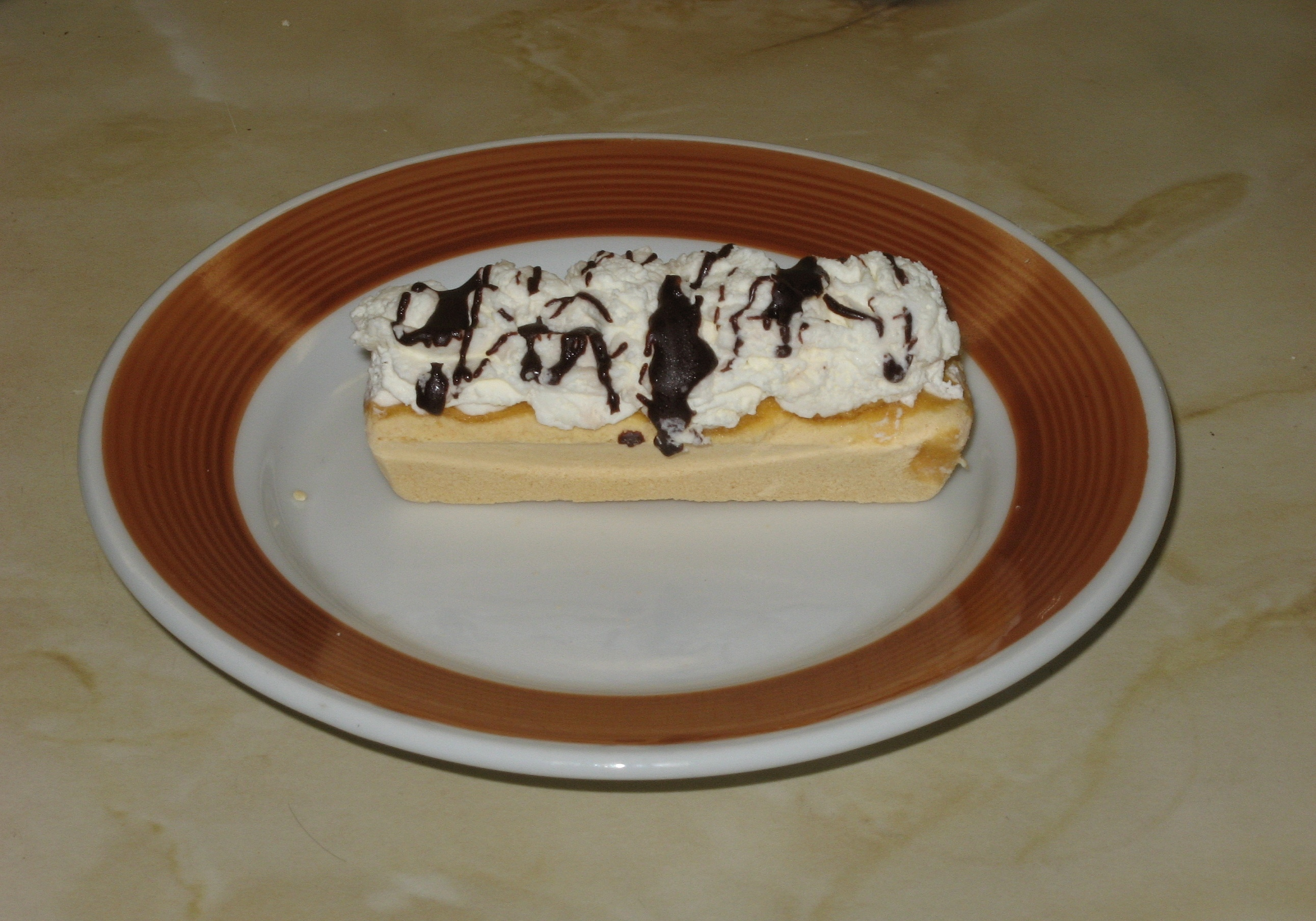
- Rakvička
- Type: Cookie
- Place of origin: Czech Republic

Rakvička (literally "little coffin") is a traditional Czech pastry made of a trough-shaped biscotti-style cookie "filled with whipped cream or chocolate-flavored whipped cream."

Rakvička might be purchased at a common type of Czech bakery called a cukrárna. One recipe states that the rakvička is made by whipping an egg, several additional egg yolks, and two types of sugar. This mixture is then poured into molds, which provide the dessert's distinctive form, and then baked in a low oven. Another recipe states "for many housewives" the hardest part is getting the "little caskets" out of the molds without breaking the cake. The molded base is then filled with whipped cream and decorated to suit.

The origin of the dessert is unknown, but it is widespread mainly in the Czech Republic, it is called a Czech classic, or typically Czech. In the Czech environment, the rakvička was probably known as early as the first half of the 20th century, the name is probably derived from the confectionery form used.
