= Vilém Klíma =

Czech electrical engineer and Holocaust survivor (1906–1985)

Vilém Klíma (10 April 1906 – 6 October 1985), originally Wilhelm Kauders, was a Czech electrical engineer and Holocaust survivor who developed a closed-form expression for the distribution factor of a symmetrical three-phase stator winding.

Following his death, an obituary in German was written by Frohne and in Czech by Čeřovský. Frohne's obituary mentions that Klíma's equation for the distribution factor (Note: Also known as the breadth factor.) of fractional slot windings is not found in textbooks. The obituary also notes that some references state that it is not possible to find a closed-form expression for the winding factor of fractional slot windings.

He was the father of Czech novelist and playwright Ivan Klíma.

== Early life ==
Vilém Klíma was born on 10 April 1906 as Wilhelm Kauders in Sládkovičovo. He completed studies with distinction in 1928 at the German Technical University in Prague (today named "České vysoké učení technické v Praze" or Czech Technical University in Prague). He then started to work for the company ČKD (Českomoravská Kolben-Daněk) in Prague. In 1932 he received his Dr.-Ing. for his dissertation entitled Systematik der Drehstromwicklungen.

After the Munich Agreement in September 1938, Germany annexed the Czech boundary territory, and later (in March 1939) occupied the whole of Bohemia.

Because of the hated German occupation of Czechoslovakia during the Second World War, Klíma changed his name from Wilhelm Kauders to Vilém Klíma. (At the time Czech families with German names frequently changed their names to Czech-sounding names.) In the references listed in the last paper by Klíma, there is an entry entitled Systematik der Drehstromwicklungen and the author is given as V. Klíma (Kauders). To supply a name between brackets is not typical, and the only paper with this title was written by Wilhelm Kauders.

=== In the Theresienstadt ghetto ===
In November 1941, the Germans ordered Klíma to leave for the concentration camp at Terezín, which was a holding camp for Jews from central and southern Europe, and was regularly cleared of its overcrowded population by transports to death camps such as Auschwitz.

Klíma's name appears in a list of lecturers (Note: The list can be found at http://makarovainit.com/list.htm) in the ghetto of Terezín. (Note: Theresienstadt is often referred to using its Czech name: Terezín.) The entry details for Kauders record the following:

Klíma's entry in the list of lecturers in the Theresienstadt ghetto
Name and Title	Kauders (Klima) (Vilem) Dr.
Birth Date	10.04.1906
Deported to Terezin	04.12.41
Deported from	Prague
Deported from Terezin	01.11.44
Survived in	Grossrosen (Note: The correct spelling is Gross-Rosen)

Klíma is also mentioned in the book (Note: A summary of the book is given at http://makarovainit.com/first.htm) University Over The Abyss: The story behind 520 lecturers and 2,430 lectures in KZ Theresienstadt 1942–1944 by Elena Makarova. The book relates how Dr. Goldschmied and Dr. Kauders were secretly taken to Germany to improve the performance of German radar. (Note: According to Klíma's son Ivan, Vilém Klíma was sent together with two other specialists: Mr. Goldschmied and Mr. Kohn to the concentration camp in Grossrosen. Mr. Goldschmied and Klíma stayed only for a few weeks in Gross-Rosen concentration camp. As a result of the evacuation of the camp both of them were sent to KZ Sachsenhausen.) A witness, Gerda Haas, (Note: This might be the same Gerda Haas mentioned at http://abacus.bates.edu/muskie-archives/EADFindingAids/MC083.html) remembered the following:

One day, the two were ordered to prepare themselves to leave Terezin. Their suitcases must have been cleaned of any signs and numbers, yellow stars were torn off. They were told that they would be employed for a large industrial concern in Germany. Their dependents stayed in Terezin. Soon, Kauders sent a postcard saying that he was in the [concentration camp] Rosenberg (or -burg), where he was freezing terribly and where he worked on his books all day.

During April 1945 Vilém Klíma survived the so-called death march (a miracle at that time).

== Scientific work ==
In the first of his two remarkable papers Klíma explains the systematics of stator windings and the calculation of the winding factors. This work aimed to determine the parameters that characterise the air gap of the winding. Also in this paper the induced voltage in the coil sides is already mentioned and represented as a vector. The resultant vector diagram was called the star of coil groups (German: Spulengruppenstern). The adjacent vectors on such a diagram that belong to the same phase is called a phase belt (German: Zone).

Two years later, in the second paper by Klíma, the algebraic methods developed in the first paper were visualised by means of Tingley's diagram. The latter could be referred to as a linear representation of what became known as the star of slots (German: Nutenstern). The star of slots is constructed using the electrical angle between two adjacent slots. Computer technology as we know it today was not available at the time and the use of graph paper certainly was common. Furthermore, such graphical methods definitely contributed to the subject of stator windings.

Klíma's first book, Trojfázové komutátorové derivační motory : jejich teorie a praxe, (Note: The book can be found in the online catalogue http://katalog.svkul.cz/eng/baze.htm) was published in 1962. Then in 1975, together with H. Jordan and K.P. Kovács, Vilém Klíma published a book on induction machines entitled Asynchronmaschinen.

After the war Klíma started a research centre, Centre for Electric Machines, in Brno where he served as the first director until 1951. In 1958 Klíma was awarded the title of Dr.Scientium technicarum for his thesis entitled Theorie der Selbstserregung von Drehstromnebenschluß-kommutatormotoren mit Kondensatoren im Läuferkreis und ihre Verhütung. Until his retirement in 1973 he was part of the research centre in Běchovice near Prague. Vilém Klíma died on 6 October 1985 in Prague.

== Klíma's closed-form expression ==
=== Introductory remarks ===
Until now, the literature that refers to Klíma's closed-form expression is very limited. Authors that refer to the closed-form expression are Kremser, Brune and Germishuizen. Additionally, Kremser and Brune are all related to the university of Hanover where Vilém Klíma regularly held lectures since 1964 as reported by Frohne. Accordingly, the distribution factor calcualtion equation proposed by Klíma is cited in textbooks mostly in German language by the professors who succeeded Jordan at the university of Hanover (later Leibniz University Hannover).

== Distribution factor ==
The distribution factor derived by Klíma for each spatial harmonic $\nu$ of all types of m-phase symmetrical fractional-slot windings, except for single-layer symmetrical fractional-slot distributed windings, as summarised by Brune, is given as

$$\xi_{p}=
\begin{cases}
\cfrac
{
\sin\left(\frac{\pi}{Q_s}Y_kq_1\nu \right)-
e^{j\frac{\pi}{t}Y_k \nu}
\sin\left(\frac{\pi}{Q_s} Y_kq_2\nu\right)
}
{
\left(q_1+q_2\right)
\sin\left(\frac{\pi}{Q_s} Y_k\nu\right)
}
\left|
e^{j\frac{\pi}{Q_s}Y_k \left(q_1-1\right)\nu}
\right|
&
q_1\neq q_2\\
\cfrac
{
\sin\left(\frac{\pi}{Q_s}Y_kq_1\nu \right)
}
{
q_1 \sin\left(\frac{\pi}{Q_s} Y_k\nu\right)
}
&
q_1= q_2\\
\end{cases}$$

where the fictive commutator pitch (for AC rotating electrical machines without a commutator) is determined by

$Y_k=\frac{gQ_b + 1}{p_b}=\frac{gQ_s}{p}+\frac{Q_s}{Q_bp}$

where

$$\quad
\begin{cases}
t = \mbox{gcd}(Q_s,p)\\
Q_b = \cfrac{Q_s}{t}\\
p_b = \cfrac{p}{t}\\
g=\mbox{smallest integer for which}\ Y_k \in \mathbb{N}\\
\end{cases}$$

and

$e^{j\frac{\pi}{t}Y_k \nu} = \cos\left({\frac{\pi}{t}Y_k \nu}\right)$ .

The numbers q_{1} and q_{2} depend on whether Q_{b} is even or odd and are calculated as follows:

$$q_1=
\begin{cases}
q_2 = \cfrac{Q_b}{2m} & Q_b\ \mbox{even} \\
q_2+1 = \cfrac{Q_b+m}{2m} & Q_b\ \mbox{odd}\\
\end{cases}$$

and other parameters are as follows:

- $\nu$: spatial harmonic.
- $m$: number of phases.
- $Q_s$: number of stator slots.
- $p$: number of pole pairs.
- $q$: number of slots per phase and per poles.
- $t$: number of fundamental (basic) windings as the regularly repetitive part of the winding layout.
- $Q_b$: number of stator slots per fundamental winding.
- $p_b$: number of pole pairs per fundamental winding.
- $Y_k$: fictive commutator pitch
