= The Czechoslovak-American Marionette Theatre =

The Czechoslovak-American Marionette Theatre was launched in 1990 with the first solo performance by puppeteer, Vít Hořejš, at Jan Hus Church on East 74th Street in New York City, the old Czech neighborhood. A senior member of the audience remarked that a puppet theater had once existed at Jan Hus when she was a child, but she was not sure what had happened to the marionettes. Curiosity led Hořejš to the church office, and an administrator showed him to the attic, where in an old chest there was a huge set of puppets, some possibly as much as 180 years old. The company's first New York season, in 1990 showcased "Johannes Dokchtor Faust, a Petrifying Puppet Comedye" from a traditional Czechoslovak puppet script. Since the debut of "Faust", many productions have been presented in New York City venues including La MaMa Experimental Theatre Club, and also, in the U.S., in venues more than 30 states. The company has also performed around the world in Poland, the Czech Republic, Turkey and Pakistan.

== Productions ==
- The Twelfth Night
- Once There Was a Village
- The Life and Times of Lee Harvey Oswald
- Don Juan, or The Wages of Debauchery
- The Prose of the Transsiberian and of the Little Joan of France
- Johannes Dokchtor Faust
- Rusalka, the Little Rivermaid
- Golem
- Peter Pan
- The Very Sad Story of Ethel & Julius, Lovers and Spyes, and about Their Untymelie End while Sitting in a Small Room at the Correctional Facility in Ossining, N.Y.
- The Bass Saxophone
- Hamlet
- The Historye of Queen Ester, King Ahasverus, and the Haughty Haman
- Czech Tales with Strings
- The White Doe, Or, The Piteous Trybulations of the Sufferyng Countess Jenovéfa
- A Christmas Carol, OY! Hanukkah, Merry Kwanzaa
- Snehurka, The Snow Maiden
- Twelve Iron Sandals
- Mr. M.
- Revolution?!
