= Lukáš Klíma (ice hockey) =

Slovak ice hockey player

- Born: 13 June 1990 (age 35) Ilava, Czechoslovakia
- Height: 5 ft 11 in (180 cm)
- Weight: 176 lb (80 kg; 12 st 8 lb)
- Position: Forward
- Shoots: Left
- Played for: HK Dukla Trenčín; HC Karlovy Vary; HK Nitra; MHC Martin; HK 36 Skalica; Piráti Chomutov; Briançon
- Playing career: 2010–present

Lukáš Klíma (born 13 June 1990) is a Slovak professional ice hockey forward.

== Career ==
Klíma played six games for HC Karlovy Vary in the Czech Extraliga during the 2010–11 Czech Extraliga season. He also played in the Tipsport Liga for HK Dukla Trenčín, HK Nitra, MHC Martin and HK 36 Skalica.

== Personal life ==
Klíma is the nephew of former NHL player Petr Klíma.
