= Ivan Klíma =

Czech novelist and playwright (1931–2025)

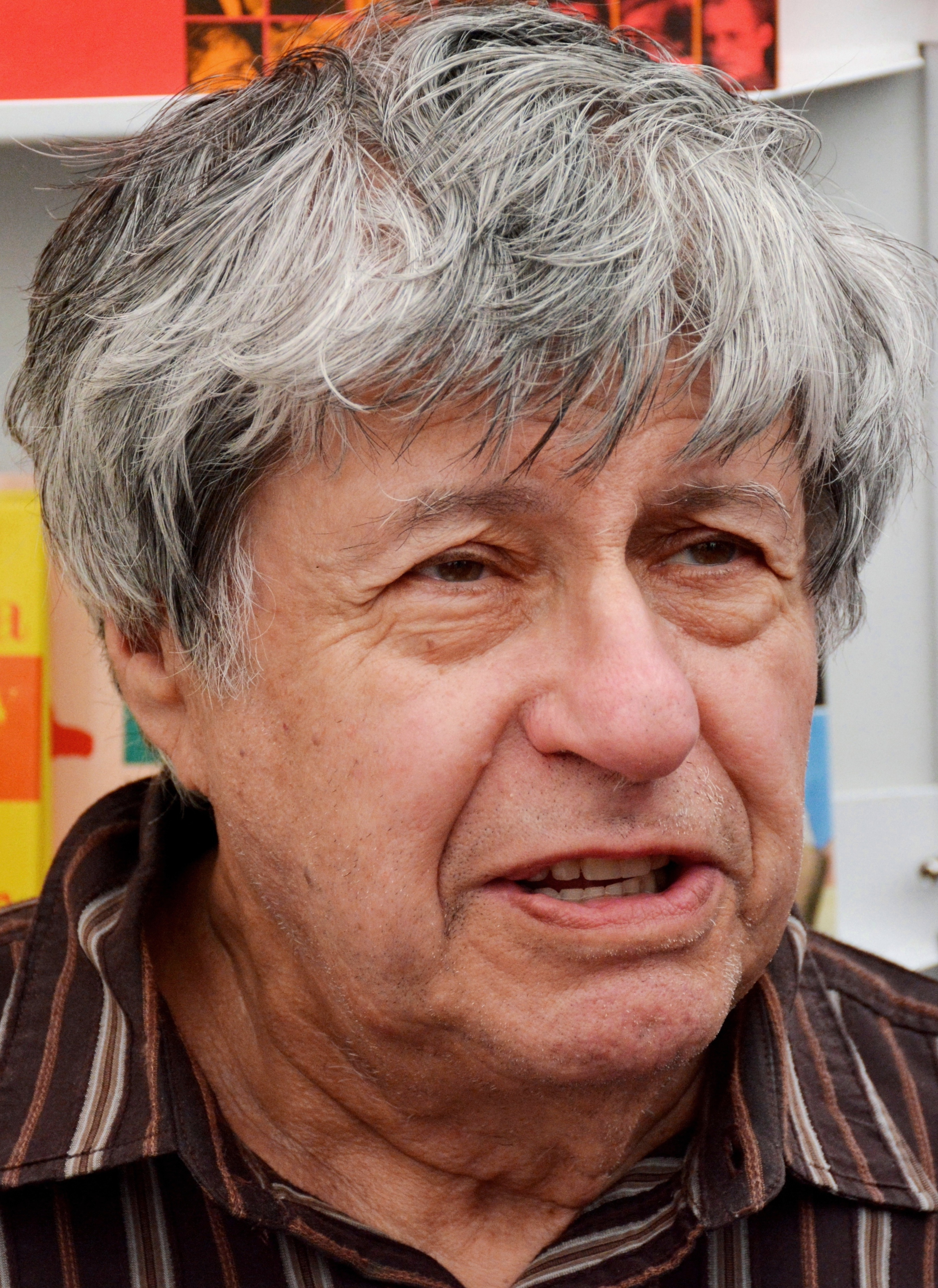
- Klíma in 2015
- Born: Ivan Kauders; 9 September 1931; Prague, Czechoslovakia
- Died: 4 October 2025 (aged 94); Prague, Czech Republic
- Education: Charles University in Prague
- Occupations: Writer, playwright, professor at University of Michigan
- Spouse: Helena Mala (m. 1958)
- Children: 2
- Relatives: Vilém Klíma (father)
- Website: www.ivanklima.cz

Signature
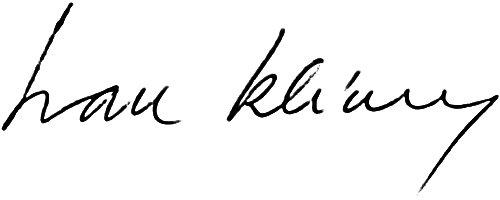

Ivan Klíma (born Ivan Kauders, 9 September 1931 – 4 October 2025) was a Czech novelist and playwright. He received the Magnesia Litera award and the Franz Kafka Prize, among other honours.

== Early life and career ==
Klíma was born Ivan Kauders in Prague on 9 September 1931. His early childhood in Prague was happy and uneventful, but this all changed with the German invasion of Czechoslovakia in 1938, after the Munich Agreement. He only learned of his Jewish heritage once the invasion had occurred.

In November 1941, first his father Vilém Klíma and then, in December, he and his mother and brother were ordered to leave for the concentration camp at Theriesenstadt (Terezín), where he was to remain until its liberation by the Red Army in May 1945. He and both his parents survived incarceration, even though Terezín, a holding camp for Jews from central and southern Europe, was regularly cleared of its overcrowded population by transports to "the East," that is, to death camps such as Auschwitz. The family adopted the less German-sounding surname of Klíma after the war.

Klíma wrote graphically about this period in articles in the British literary magazine Granta, particularly A Childhood in Terezin. He wrote that "anyone who has been through a concentration camp as a child, who has been completely dependent on an external power which can at any moment come in and beat or kill him and everyone around him, probably moves through life at least a bit differently from people who have been spared such an education. That life can be snapped like a piece of string - that was my daily lesson as a child."

With the post-war rise of the Czech Communist regime and proxy Soviet control, Klima became a member of the Communist Party of Czechoslovakia. Eventually, his childhood hopes for the triumph of good over evil became an adult awareness that it was often "not the forces of good and evil that do battle with each other, but merely two different evils, in competition for the control of the world". The show trials and murders of those who opposed the new regime began, and Klíma's father was again imprisoned, this time by fellow countrymen.

During the Prague Spring of 1968, Klíma was a leading dissident. At the time of the Soviet invasion of Czechoslovakia in August 1968, Klíma was in London, on his way to a teaching engagement in Michigan. However, he returned to Prague in March 1970. Although he was then deprived of his passport and forced to work in menial jobs, he remained a member of the literary 'underground', smuggling books and getting involved in samizdat. After the overthrow of communism in 1989, Klíma became a prominent supporter of Václav Havel.

== Personal life and death ==
In 1958, Klíma married psychologist Helena Mala, with whom he had two children.

Klíma died at his residence in Prague, on the morning of 4 October 2025, at the age of 94.

== Writing ==
Klíma was awarded the Franz Kafka Prize in 2002. His two-volume memoir Moje šílené století (My Crazy Century) won the Magnesia Litera, a Czech literary prize, in the non-fiction category in 2010. My Crazy Century was published in English in 2013 by Grove Press.

== Bibliography ==
- Bezvadný den (1960; English: A Wonderful Day)
- Hodina ticha (1963; English: A Peaceful Hour)
- Milenci na jednu noc (1964)
- Loď, jménem Naděje (1969)
- A Ship Named Hope: Two Novels (1970)
- Milostné léto (1972; English: A Summer Affair (1987))
- Ma veselá jitra (1979; English: My Merry Mornings: Stories from Prague (1985))
- Moje první lásky (1985; English: My First Loves (1986))
- Láska a smetí (1986; English: Love and Garbage (1990))
- Soudce z milosti (1986; English: Judge on Trial (1991))
- Už se blíží meče: Eseje, Fejetony, Rozhovory (1990)
- Ministr a anděl (1990)
- Rozhovor v Praze (1990)
- Moje zlatá řemesla (1990; English: My Golden Trades)
- Hry: Hra o dvou dějstvích (1991)
- Ostrov mrtvých králů (1992)
- Čekání na tmu, čekání na světlo (1993; English: Waiting for the Dark, Waiting for the Light)
- The Spirit of Prague and Other Essays (1994)
- Milostné rozhovory (1995)
- Jak daleko je slunce (1995)
- Poslední stupeň důvěrnosti (1996; English: Ultimate Intimacy)
- Kruh nepřátel českého jazyka: Fejetony (1998)
- O chlapci, který se nestal číslem (1998)
- Fictions and Histories (1998)
- Lovers for a Day: New and Collected Stories on Love (1999)
- Ani svatí, ani andělé (1999; English: No Saints or Angels)
- Between Security and Insecurity (1999)
- Velký věk chce mít též velké mordy: život a dílo Karla Čapka (2001; English: A Great Age Needs Great Murders: Life and Works of Karel Čapek)
- Karel Čapek: Life and Work (English translation of above; 2002)
- Premiér a anděl (2003)
- Moje nebezpečné výlety (2004; English: My Golden Trips)
- Moje šílené století (2009; English: My Crazy Century (2013))
