= Mycenaean religion =

Ancient Greek religion

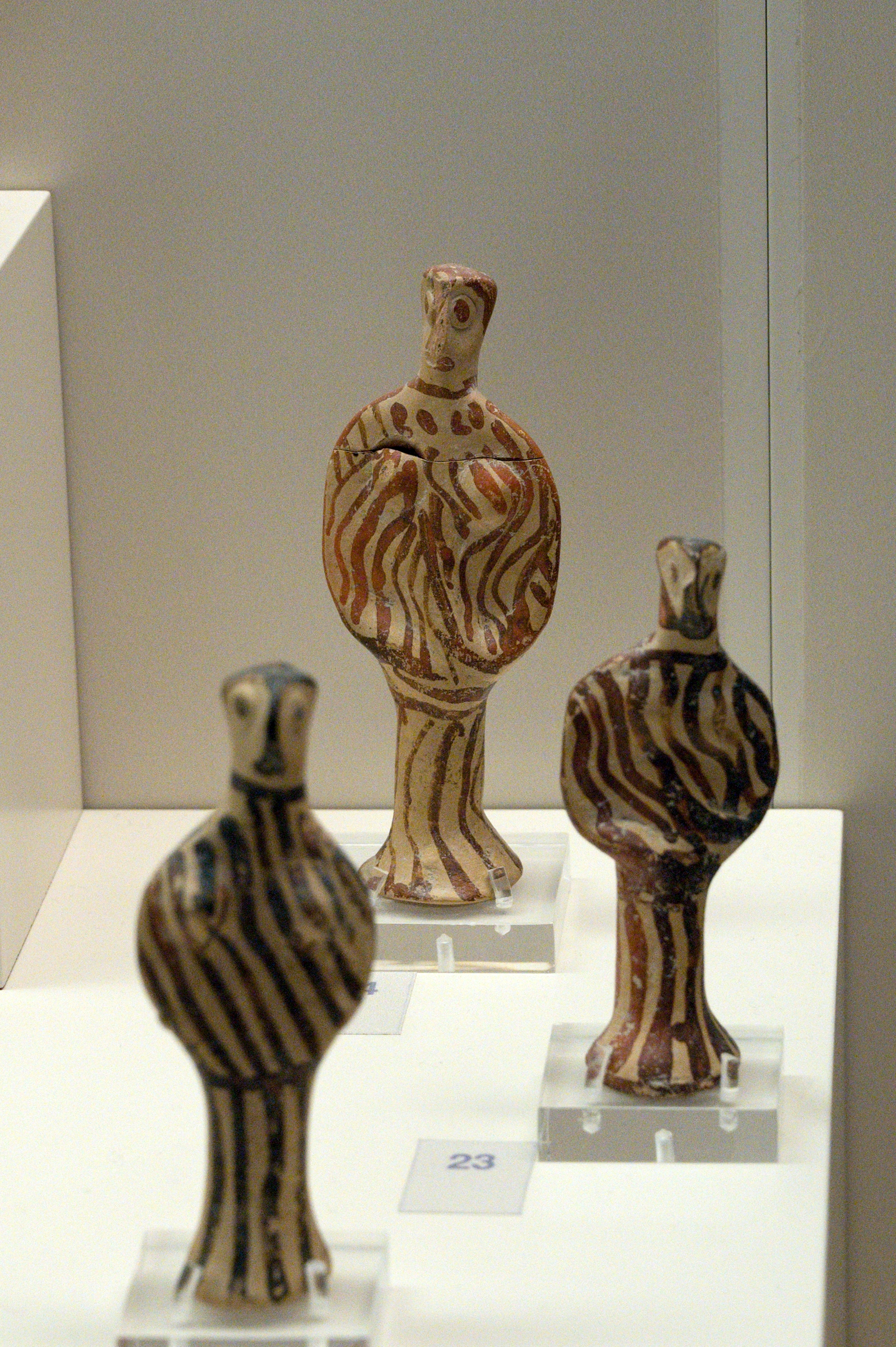
Phi type Mycenaean figurines of the so-called 'Bird Goddesses', 14th century BC, Archaeological Museum of Nafplion

The religious beliefs and practices of Mycenaean Greece (c. 1600–1100 BC) are difficult to discern due to limited archeological, iconographical, and material records. Existing evidence suggests that the Mycenaean religion was the mother of the Greek religion, sharing many divinities later found in classical Greece (510–323 BC), including Zeus, Poseidon, and Dionysus. Several Mycenaean religious customs, such as animal sacrifices and votive offerings, survived into the Greek period, as did terms and concepts such as theos (deity), hieros (holy man), nawos (temple), and temenos (land cut off and assigned for communal purposes).

John Chadwick noted that at least six centuries lie between the earliest presence of Proto-Greek speakers in Hellas and the earliest inscriptions in the Mycenaean script known as Linear B, during which concepts and practices will have fused with indigenous pre-Greek beliefs, and—if cultural influences in material culture reflect influences in religious beliefs—with Minoan religion. As for these texts, the few lists of offerings that give names of gods as recipients of goods reveal little about religious practices, and there is no other surviving literature.

Chadwick also rejected a confusion of Minoan and Mycenaean religion derived from archaeological correlations and cautioned against "the attempt to uncover the prehistory of classical Greek religion by conjecturing its origins and guessing the meaning of its myths" above all through treacherous etymologies. Moses I. Finley detected very few authentic Mycenaean reflections in the eighth-century Homeric world, in spite of its "Mycenaean" setting. Martin Nilsson asserted—based not on uncertain etymologies but on religious elements and on the representations and general function of the gods—that many Minoan gods and religious conceptions were fused in the Mycenaean religion.

More recent scholarship by Thomas G. Palaima (2008) has determined that while the Mycenaean religion had common origins and aspects of other pre-Greek peoples, including the Minoans, "key elements" of the latter's religious traditions and beliefs are either wholly absent or negligible among the Mycenaeans.

== Divinities ==
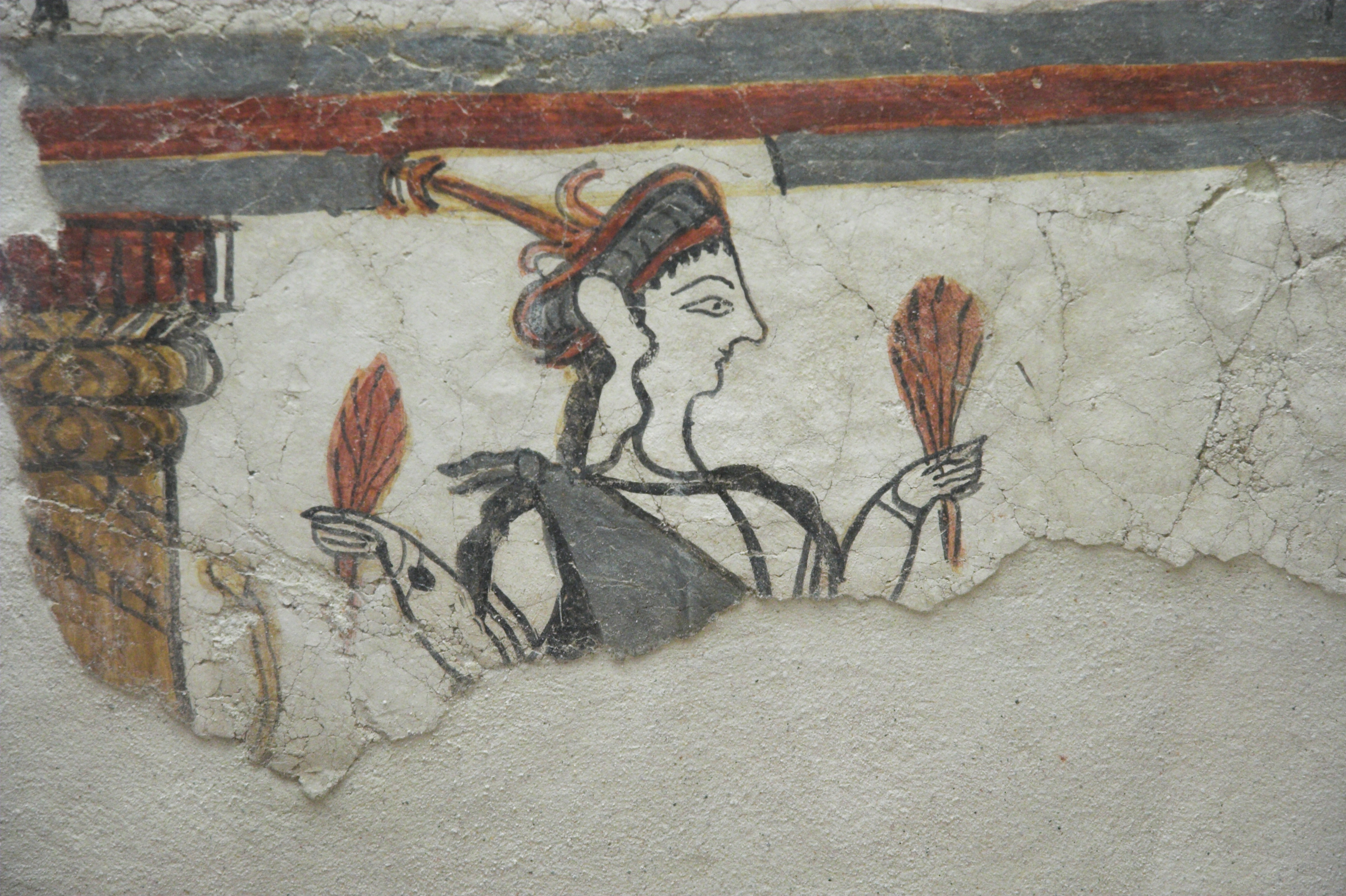
Fresco depicting a goddess or priestess in Mycenae, 1250–1180 BC.

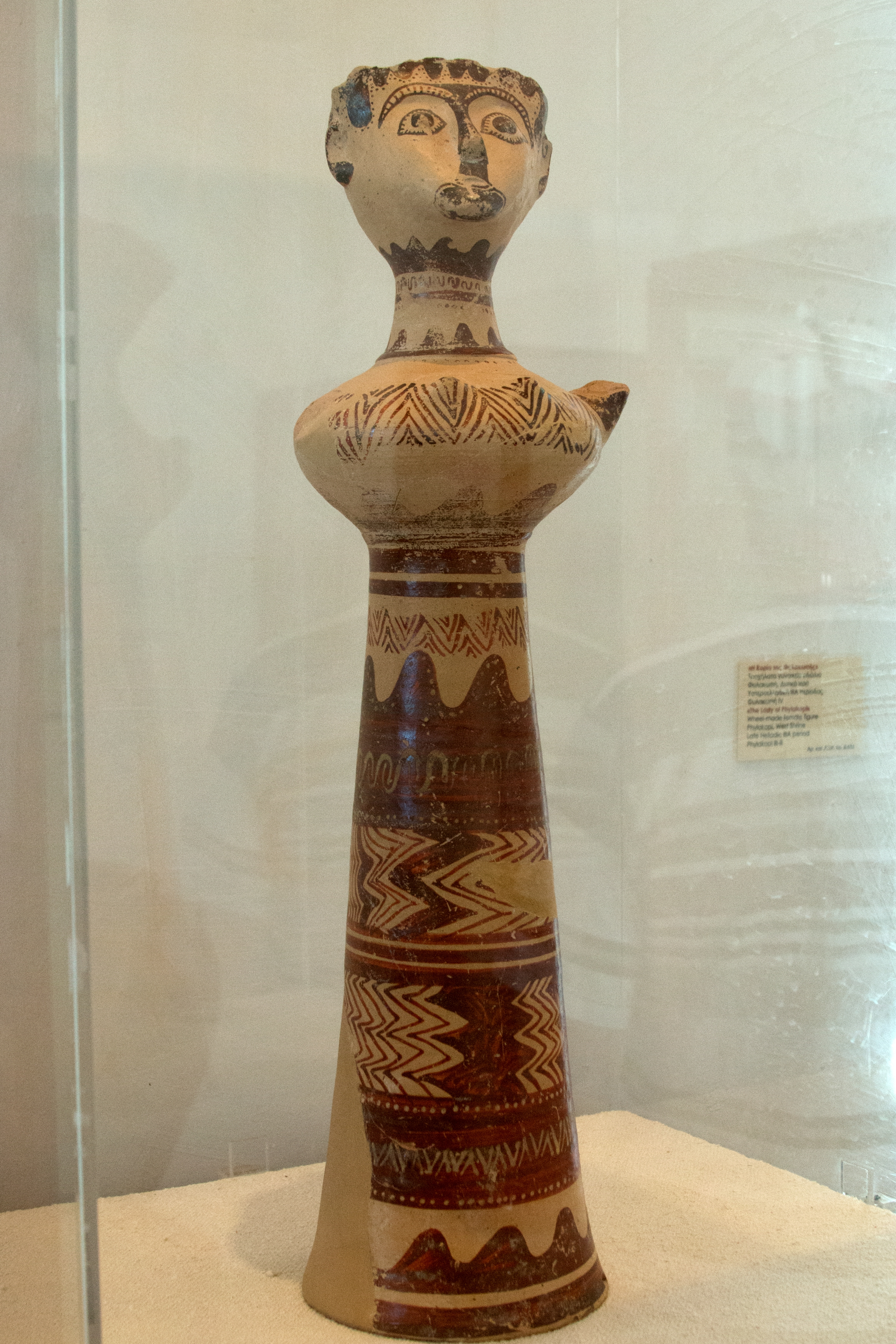
The Lady of Phylakopi; wheel-made pottery figurine of a goddess or priestess from the West Shrine of Phylakopi; late Helladic III A period, 14th century BC, Archaeological Museum of Milos

Poseidon (Po-se-da-o) seems to have occupied a place of privilege. He was a chthonic deity, connected with the earthquakes (E-ne-si-da-o-ne: "earth shaker"), but it seems that he also represented the river spirit of the underworld as it often happens in Northern European folklore. Also to be found are a collection of "Ladies". A number of tablets from Pylos list Po-ti-ni-ja (Potnia, "lady" or "mistress") without any accompanying word. It seems that she had an important shrine at the site Pakijanes near Pylos. One inscription at Knossos in Crete names the "mistress of the Labyrinth" (da-pu-ri-to-jo po-ti-ni-ja), who calls to mind the myth of the Minoan labyrinth. The title was applied to many goddesses. In a Linear B tablet found at Pylos, the "two queens and the king" (wa-na-ssoi, wa-na-ka-te) are mentioned, and John Chadwick relates these with the precursor goddesses of Demeter, Persephone and Poseidon.

Demeter and her daughter Persephone, the goddesses of the Eleusinian Mysteries, were usually referred to as "the two goddesses" or "the mistresses" in historical times. Inscriptions in Linear B found at Pylos, mention the goddesses Pe-re-swa, who may be related with Persephone, and Si-to po-ti-ni-ja, who is an agricultural goddess. A cult title of Demeter is "Sito" (σίτος: wheat). The mysteries were established during the Mycenean period (1500 BC) at the city of Eleusis and it seems that they were based on a pre-Greek vegetation cult with Minoan elements. The cult was originally private and there is no information about it, but certain elements suggest that it could have similarities with the cult of Despoina ("the mistress")—the precursor goddess of Persephone—in isolated Arcadia that survived up to classical times. In the primitive Arcadian myth, Poseidon, the river spirit of the underworld, appears as a horse (Poseidon Hippios). He pursues Demeter who becomes a mare and from the union she bears the fabulous horse Arion and a daughter, "Despoina", who obviously originally had the shape or the head of a mare. Pausanias mentions animal-headed statues of Demeter and of other gods in Arcadia. At Lycosura on a marble relief, appear figures of women with the heads of different animals, obviously in a ritual dance. This could explain a Mycenaean fresco from 1400 BC that represents a procession with animal masks and the procession of "daemons" in front of a goddess on a golden ring from Tiryns. The Greek myth of the Minotaur probably originated from a similar "daemon". In the cult of Despoina at Lycosura, the two goddesses are closely connected with the springs and the animals, and especially with Poseidon and Artemis, the "mistress of the animals" who was the first nymph. The existence of the nymphs was bound to the trees or the waters which they haunted.

Artemis appears as a daughter of Demeter in the Arcadian cults and she became the most popular goddess in Greece. The earliest attested forms of the name Artemis are the Mycenaean Greek a-te-mi-to and a-ti-mi-te, written in Linear B at Pylos. Her precursor goddess (probably the Minoan Britomartis) is represented between two lions on a Minoan seal and also on some goldrings from Mycenae. The representations are quite similar to those of "Artemis Orthia" at Sparta. In her temple at Sparta, wooden masks representing human faces have been found that were used by dancers in the vegetation-cult. Artemis was also connected with the Minoan "cult of the tree," an ecstatic and orgiastic cult, which is represented on Minoan seals and Mycenaean gold rings.

Paean (Pa-ja-wo) is probably the precursor of the Greek physician of the gods in Homer's Iliad. He was the personification of the magic-song which was supposed to "heal" the patient. Later it became also a song of victory (παιάν). The magicians was also called "seer- doctors" (ιατρομάντεις), a function which was also applied later to Apollo.

Athena (A-ta-na) appears in a Linear B inscription at Knossos from the Late Minoan II-era. The form A-ta-na po-ti-ni-ja (mistress Athena) is similar to the later Homeric form. She was probably the goddess of the palace who is represented in the famous "Procession-fresco" at Knossos. In a Mycenaean fresco, there is a composition of two women extending their hands towards a central figure who is covered by an enormous figure-eight shield. The central figure is the war-goddess with her palladium, or her palladium in an aniconic representation.

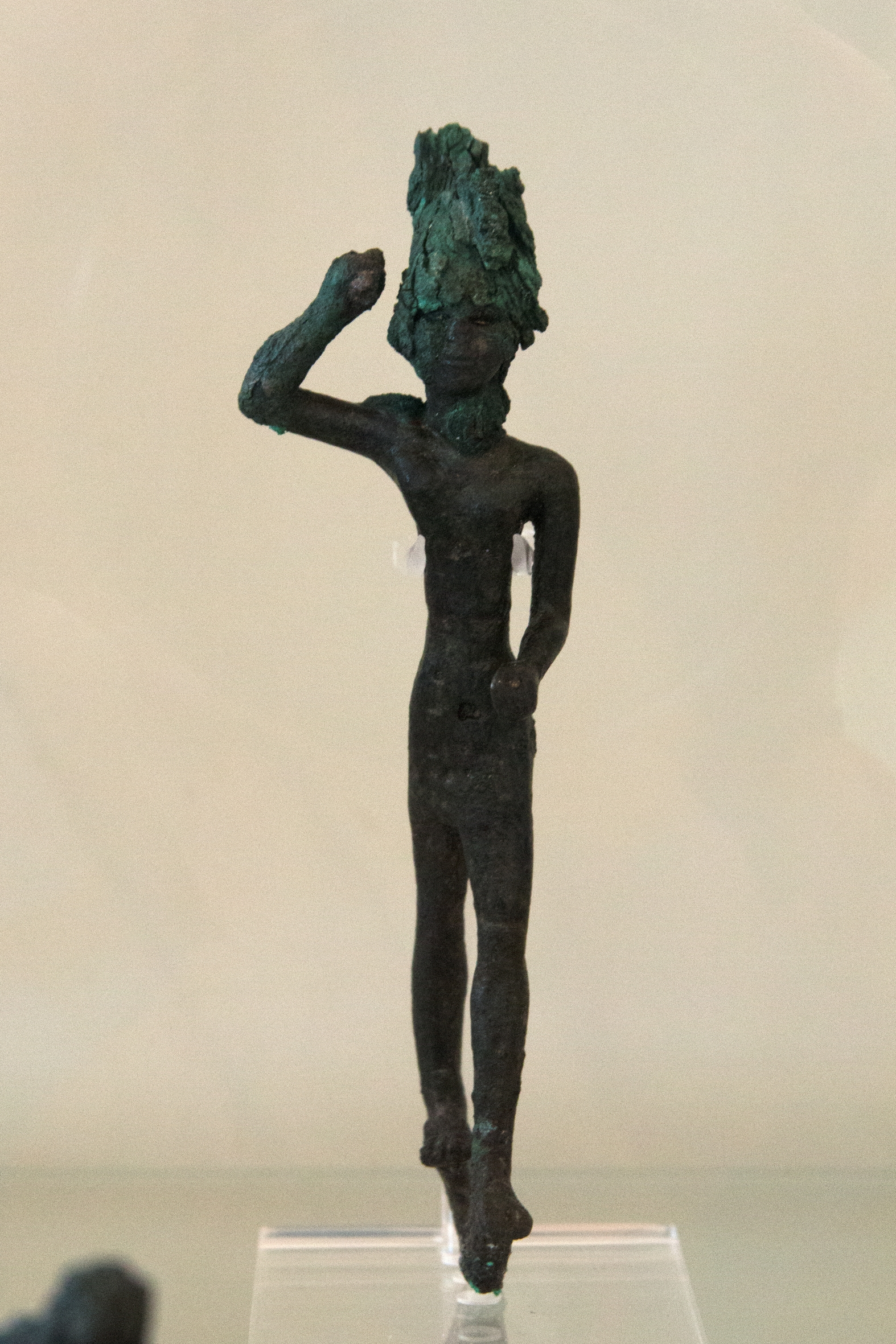
Bronze figurine of man from the Sanctuary in Phylakopi, Late Helladic III C period, Mycenaean culture, Archaeological Museum of Milos

Dionysos (Di-wo-nu-so) also appears in some inscriptions. His name is interpreted as "son of Zeus" and probably has a Thraco-Phrygian origin. Later his cult is related with Boeotia and Phocis, where it seems that was introduced before the end of the Mycenean age. This may explain why his myths and cult were centered in Thebes, and why the mountain Parnassos in Phocis was the place of his orgies. However, in the Homeric poems he is the consort of the Minoan vegetation goddess Ariadne. He is the only Greek god other than Attis who dies in order to be reborn, as it often appears in the religions of the Orient. His myth is related with the Minoan myth of the "divine child" who was abandoned by his mother and then brought up by the powers of nature. Similar myths appear in the cults of Hyakinthos (Amyklai), Erichthonios (Athens), and Ploutos (Eleusis).

A similar divine child myth was widespread throughout various periods of Mycanean Greece proper, and there, the child was thought to have been Bacchus, Zeus, or another figure of mythical importance.

Other divinities who can be found in later periods have been identified, such as the couple Zeus–Hera, Hephaestus, Ares, Hermes, Eileithyia, and Erinya. Hephaestus, for example, is likely associated with A-pa-i-ti-jo at Knossos whereas Apollo is mentioned only if he is identified with Paiāwōn; Aphrodite, however, is entirely absent. Qo-wi-ja ("cow-eyed") is a standard Homeric epithet of Hera. Ares has appeared under the name Enyalios (assuming that Enyalios is not a separate god) and though the importance of Areias is unknown, it does resemble the name of the god of war. Eleuthia is associated with Eileithuia, the Homeric goddess of child-birth.

Representations of the "Minoan Genius" are widely found in the continental parts of Mycenaean Greece.

== Shrines and sanctuaries ==
There were some sites of importance for cults, such as Lerna, typically in the form of house sanctuaries since the free-standing temple containing a cult image in its cella with an open-air altar before it was a later development. Certain buildings found in citadels having a central room, the megaron, of oblong shape surrounded by small rooms may have served as places of worship. Aside from that, the existence of a domestic cult may be supposed. Some shrines have been located, as at Phylakopi on Milos, where a considerable number of statuettes discovered there were undoubtedly fashioned to serve as offerings, and it can be supposed from archaeological strata that sites such as Delphi, Dodona, Delos, Eleusis, Lerna, and Abae were already important shrines, and in Crete several Minoan shrines show continuity into LMIII (1400-1150 BCE), a period of Minoan-Mycenaean culture.
