= Archaeological Museum of Milos =

Coordinates: 36.74384°N 24.42361°E

- Αρχαιολογικό Μουσείο Μήλου
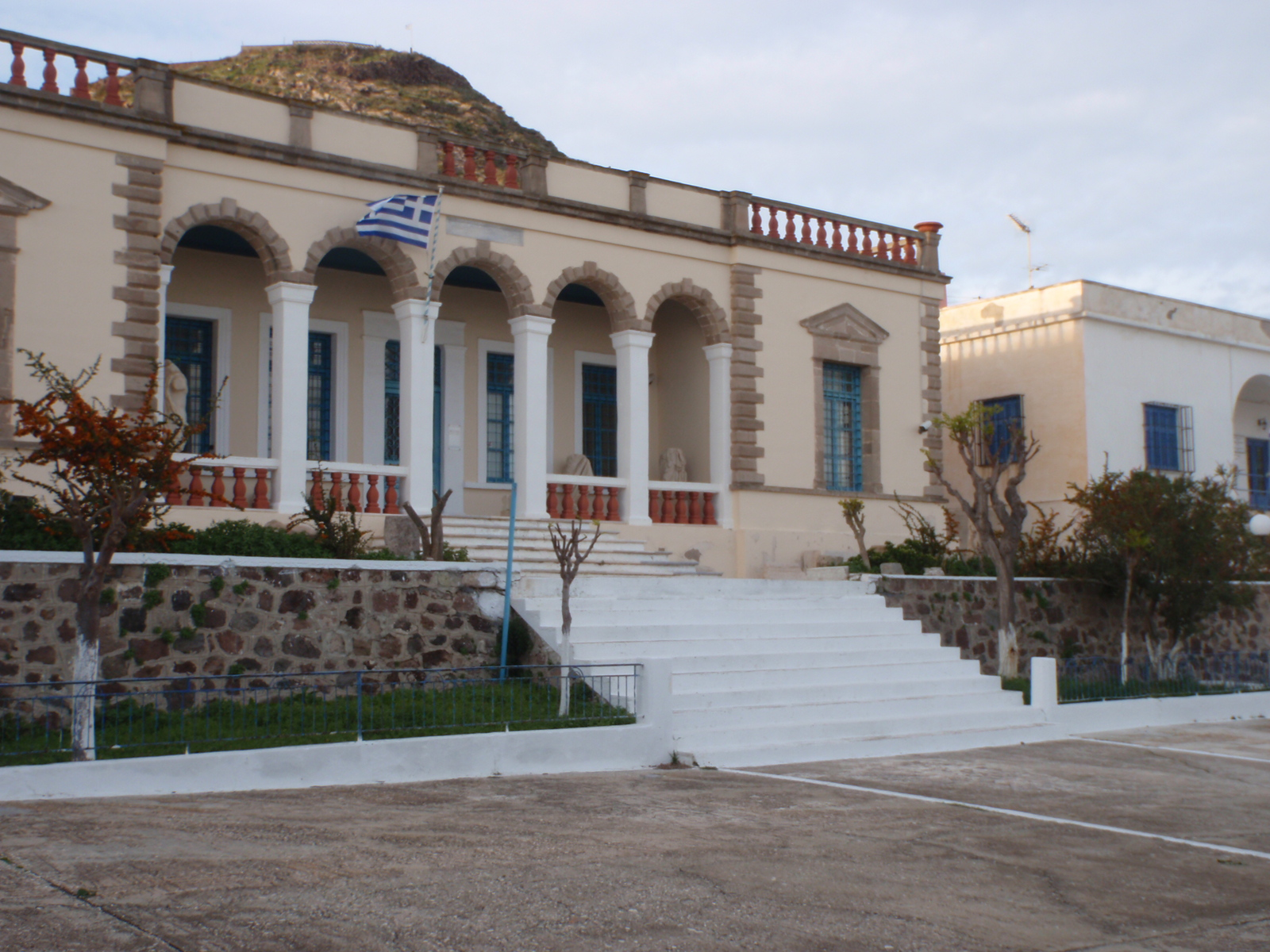
- Location: Milos, Greece
- Type: Archaeological museum

The Archaeological Museum of Milos is a museum in Plaka on the island of Milos, in Greece. Its collections include exhibits dating from the late Neolithic to the Byzantine period. The unique is collection of ancient Cycladic art, especially numerous findings from Phylakopi on Milos, from early Bronze Age to the late Bronze Age. The best pieces from Phylakopi are in the Ashmolean Museum (Oxford), British Museum, National Museum of Athens, and elsewhere around the world.

The museum is housed since 1985 in a neo-classical building dating from 1870 on the main square in Plaka. In the porch of the building and on the courtyard is lapidary with torsos from the late antiquity.

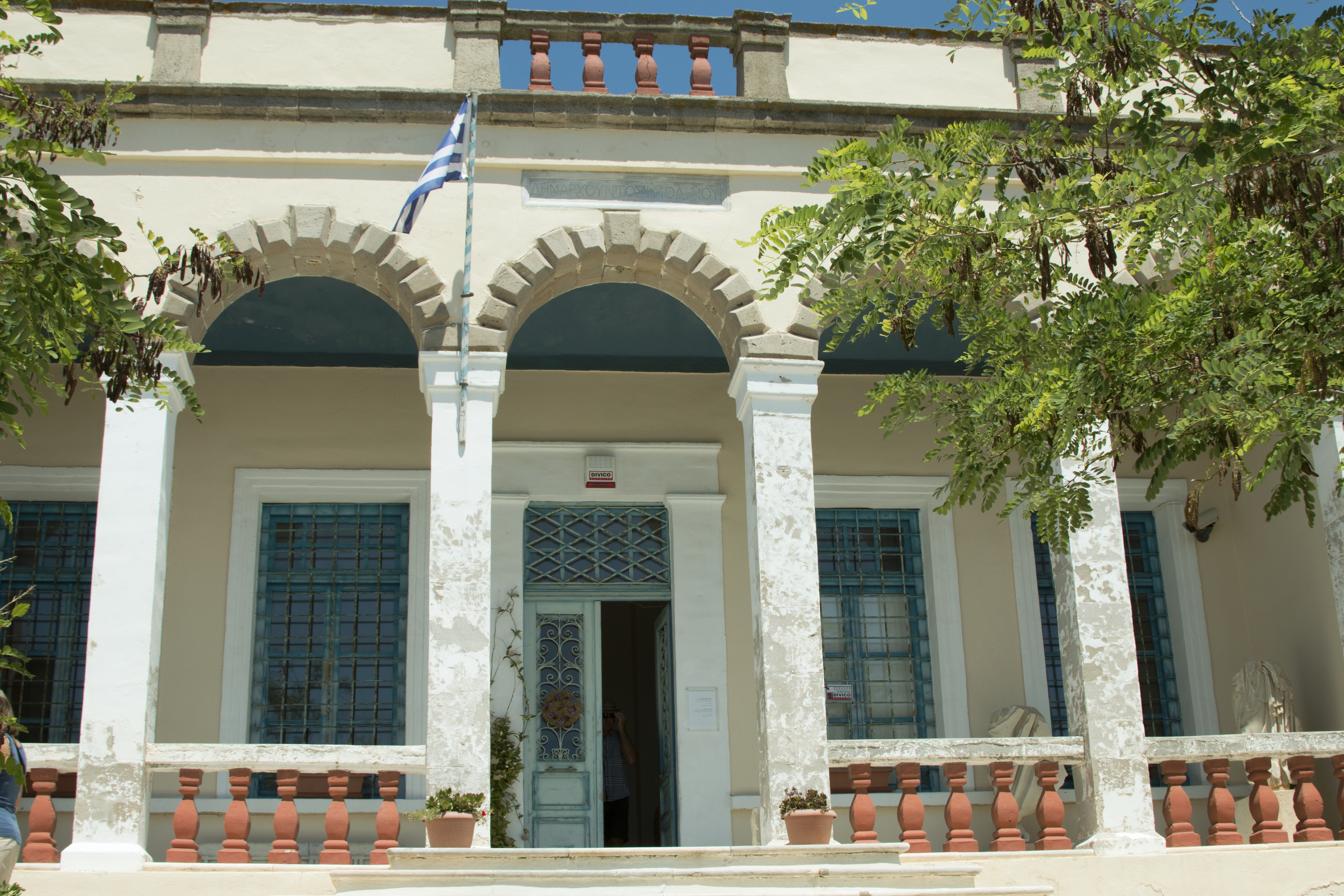

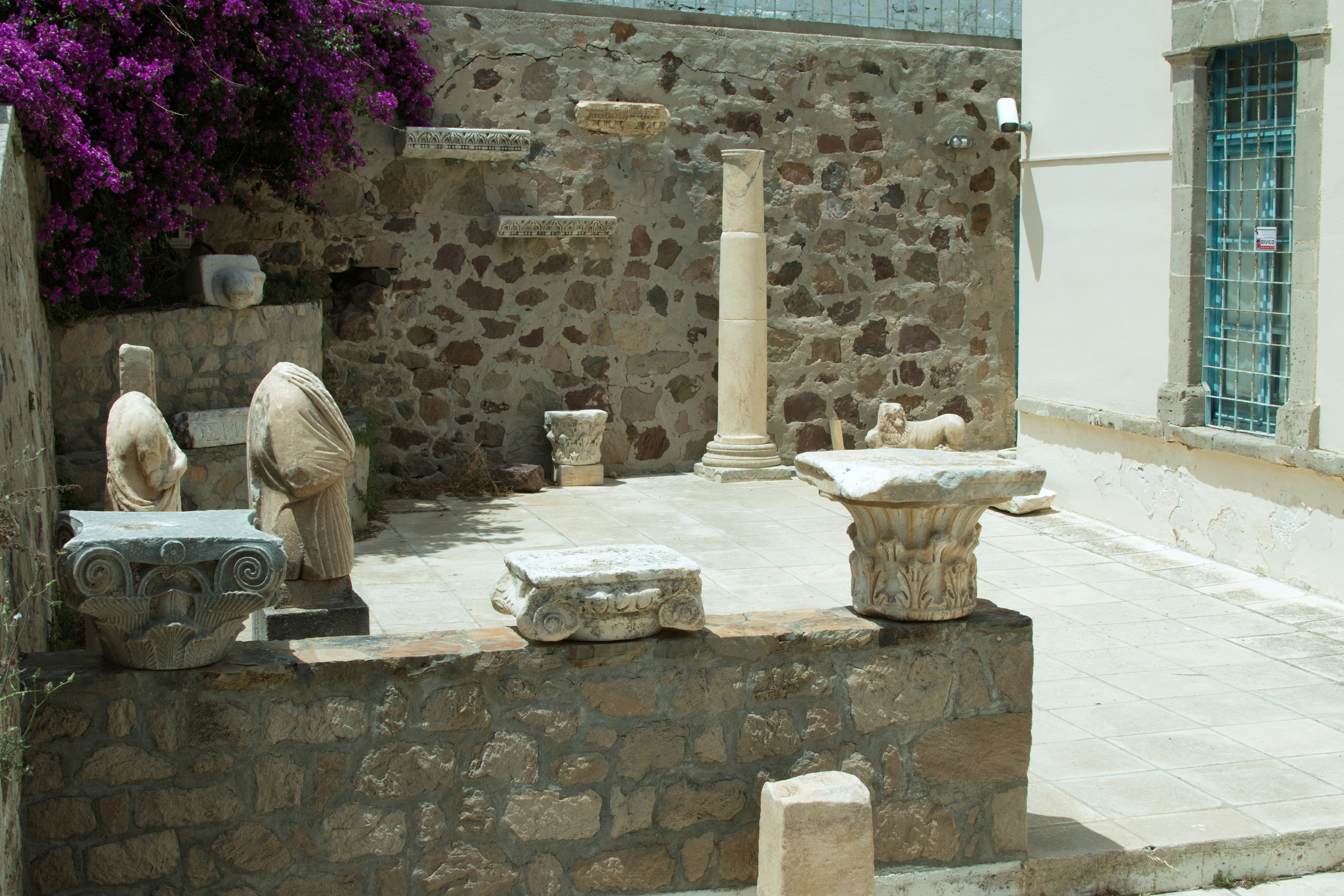

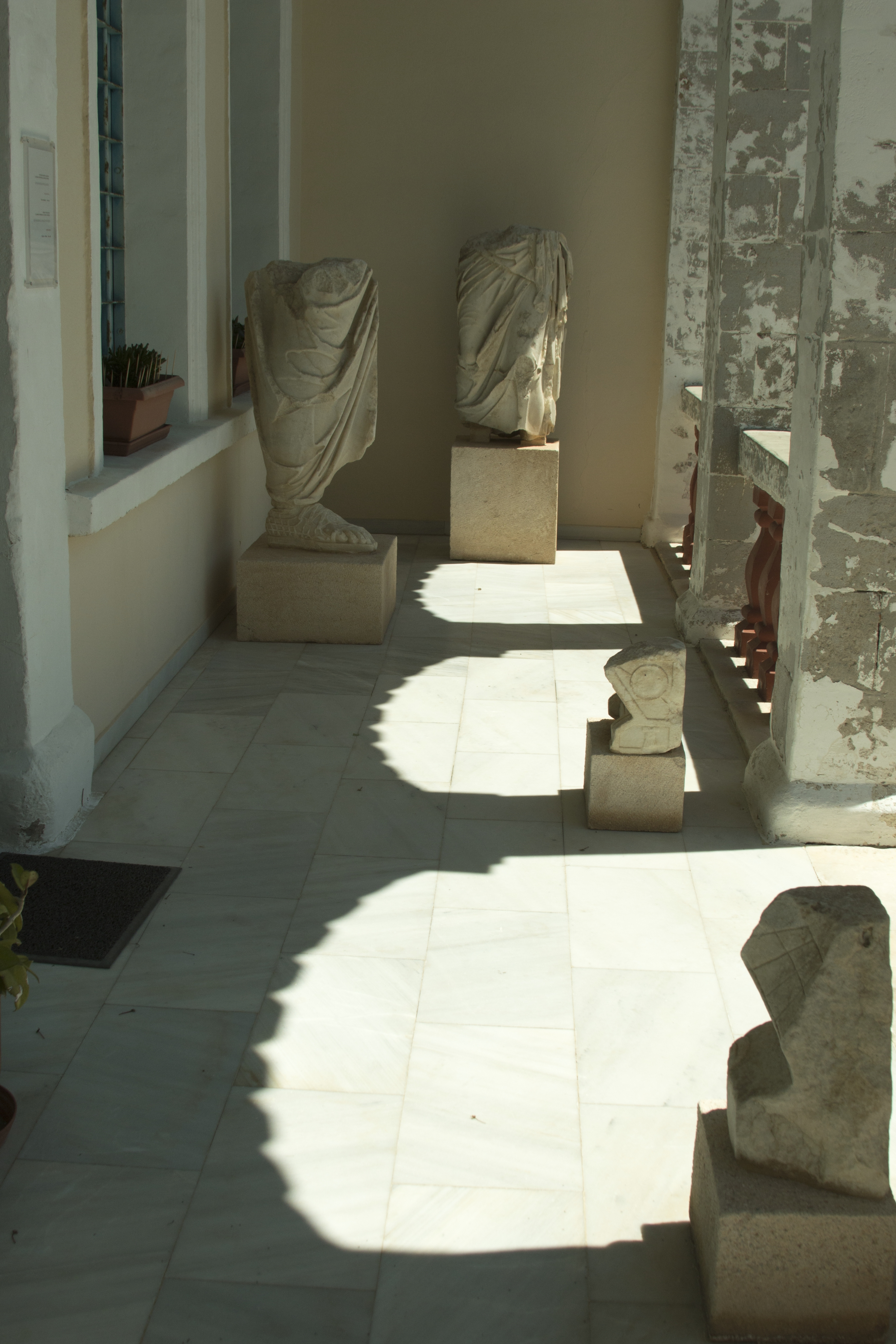

== Room 1 ==
The first room hosts large pottery vessels since the late Bronze Age to the Greek archaic period, a modern copy of the statue of Venus de Milo and a collection of obsidian tools from Neolithic to early Bronze Age.

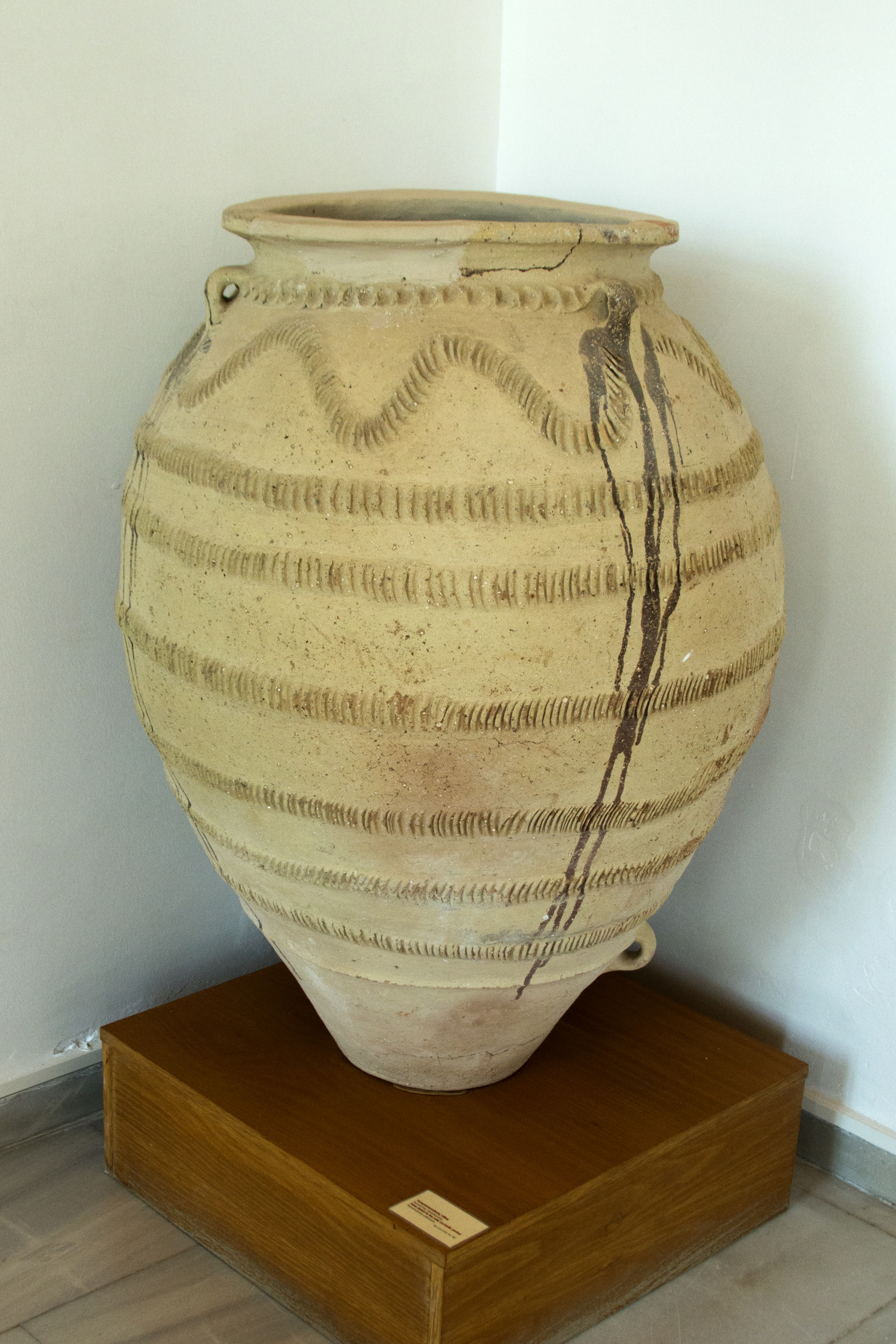
Pithos, late Bronze Age

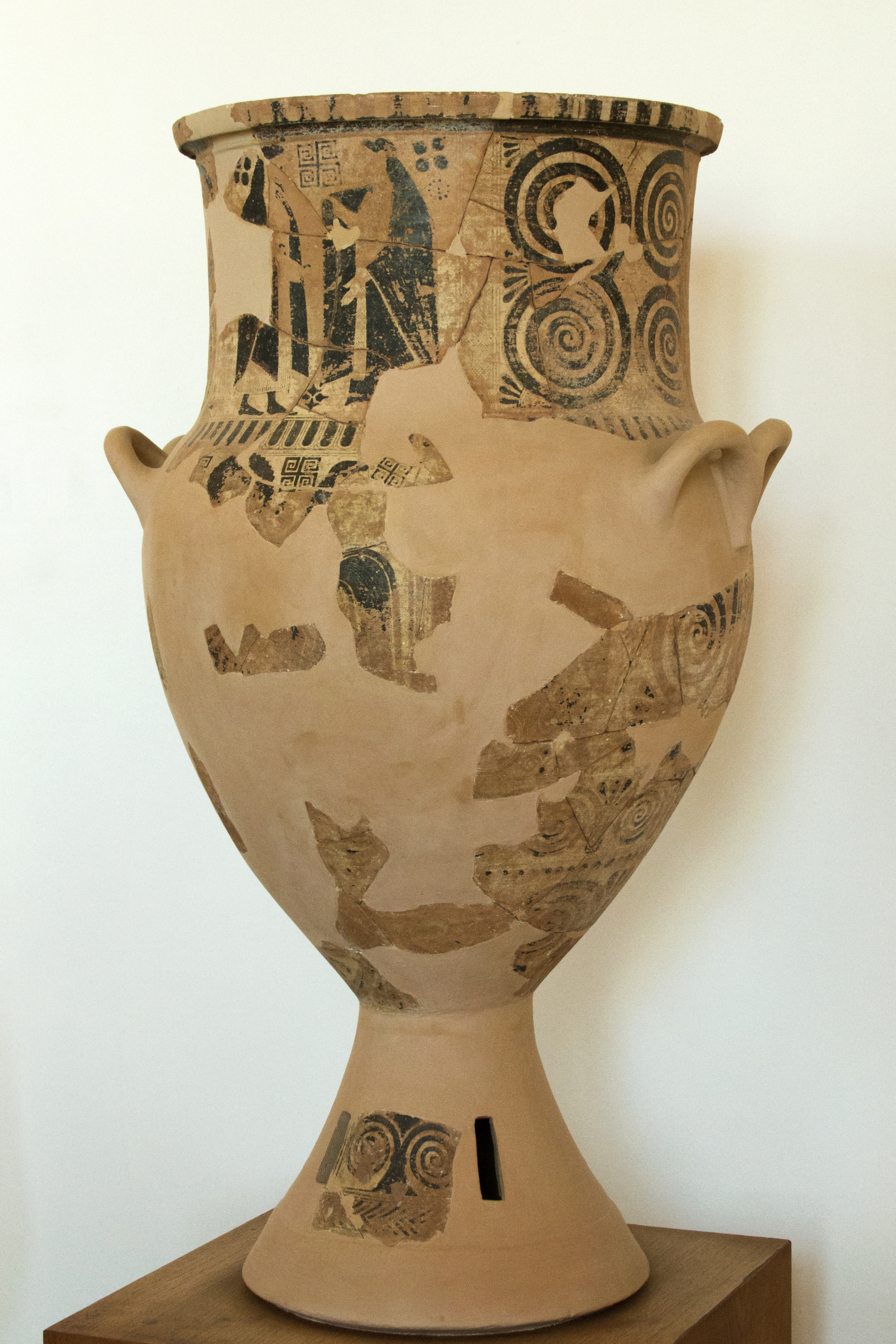
Fragments of a Melian pithamphora, 650-600 BC

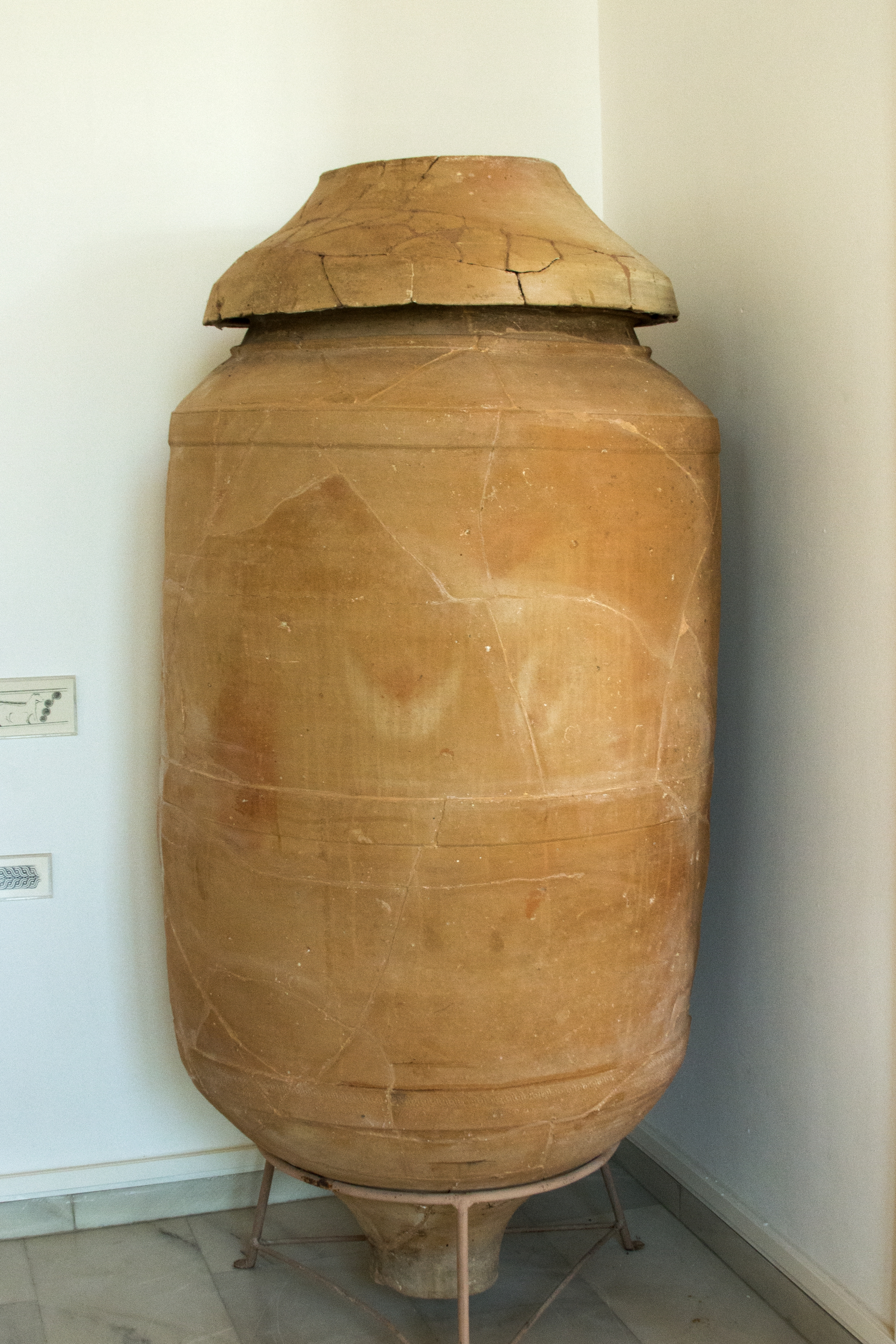
Large pithos, 6th century BC

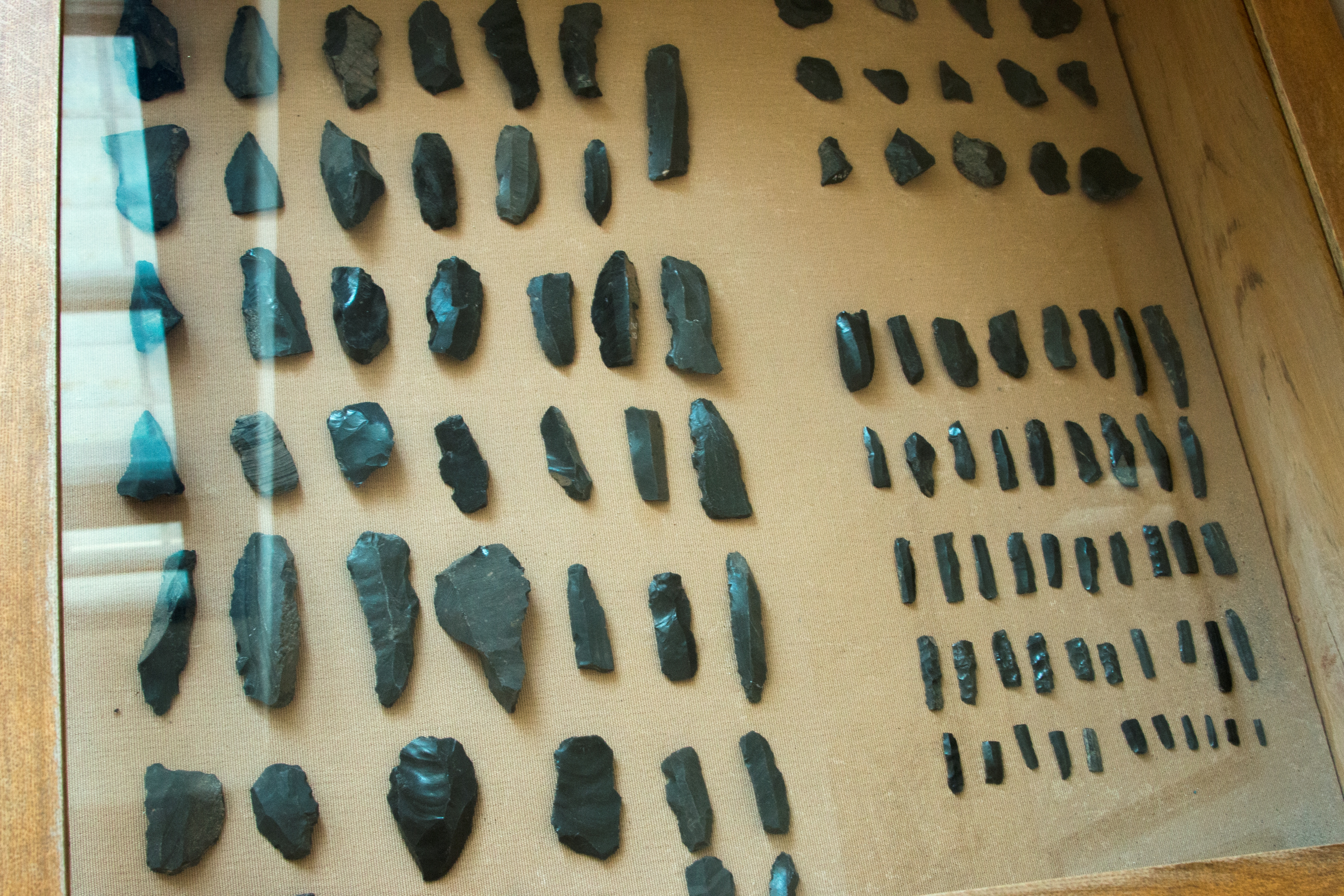
Obsidian tools

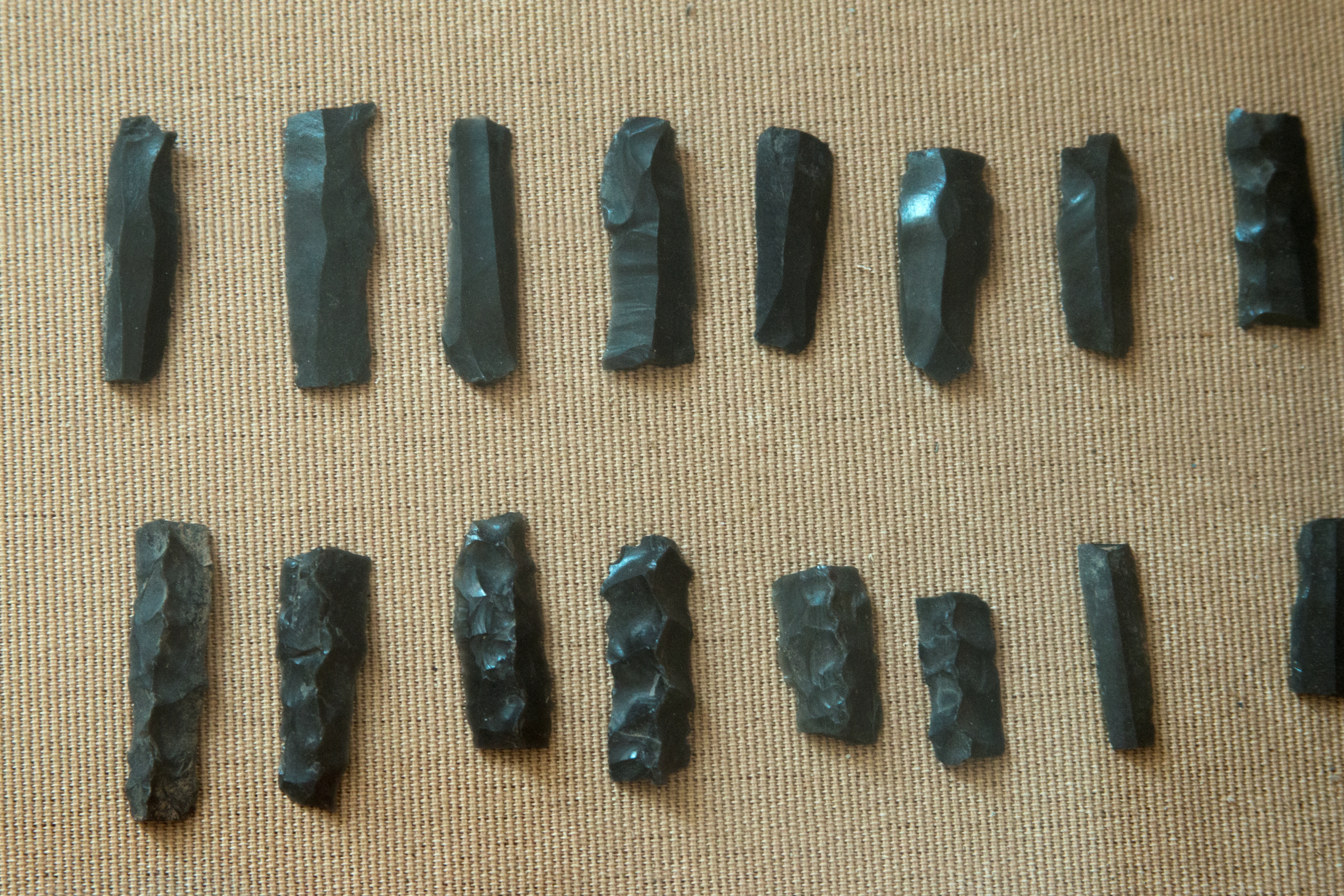
Obsidian blades

== Room 2 ==
The main museum treasures: The Bronze Age on Milos: Early Cycladic, Minoan and Mycenaean artefacts from Phylakopi and from other places of the island.

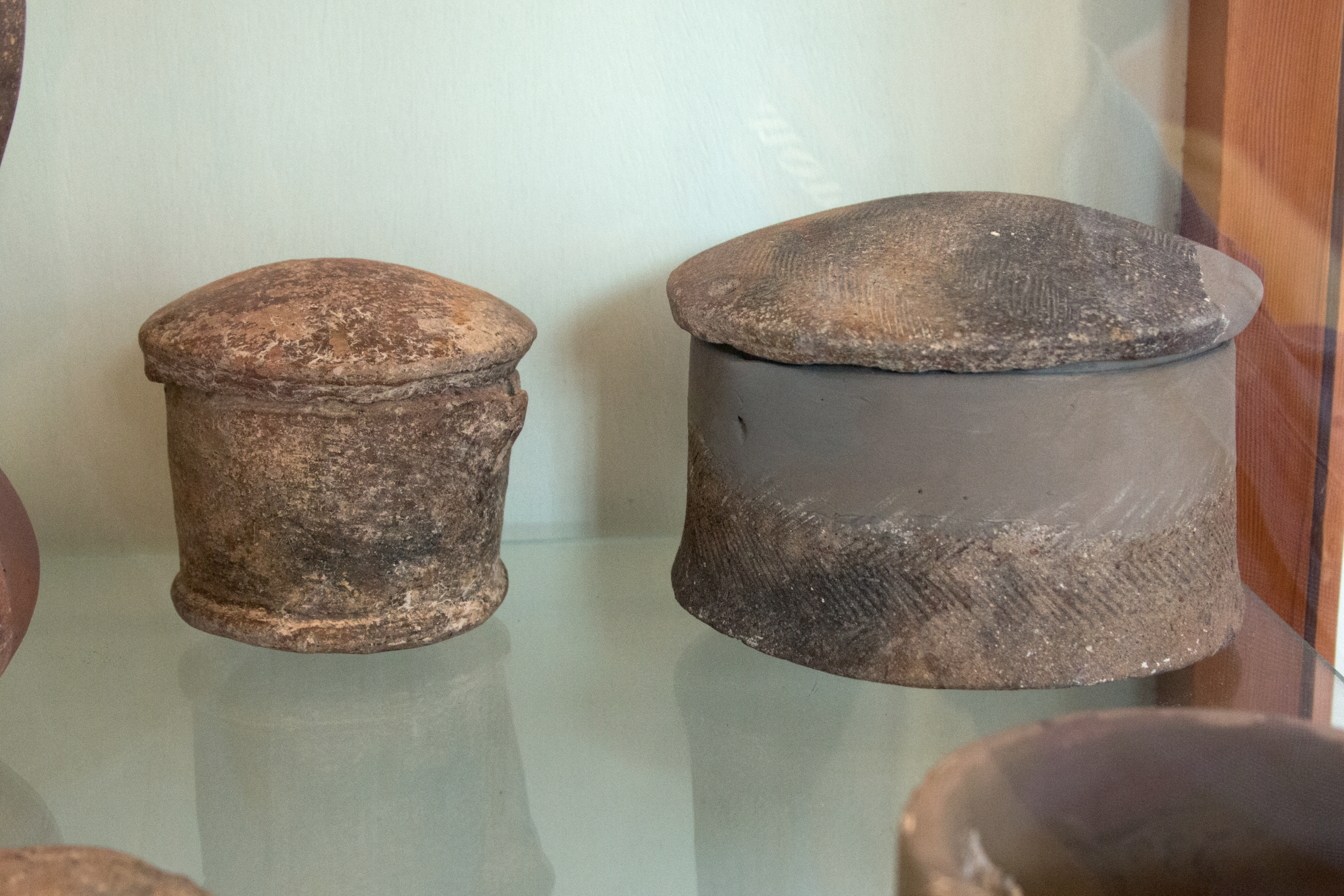
Early Cyclydic pottery pyxides, ca 3200-2500 BC

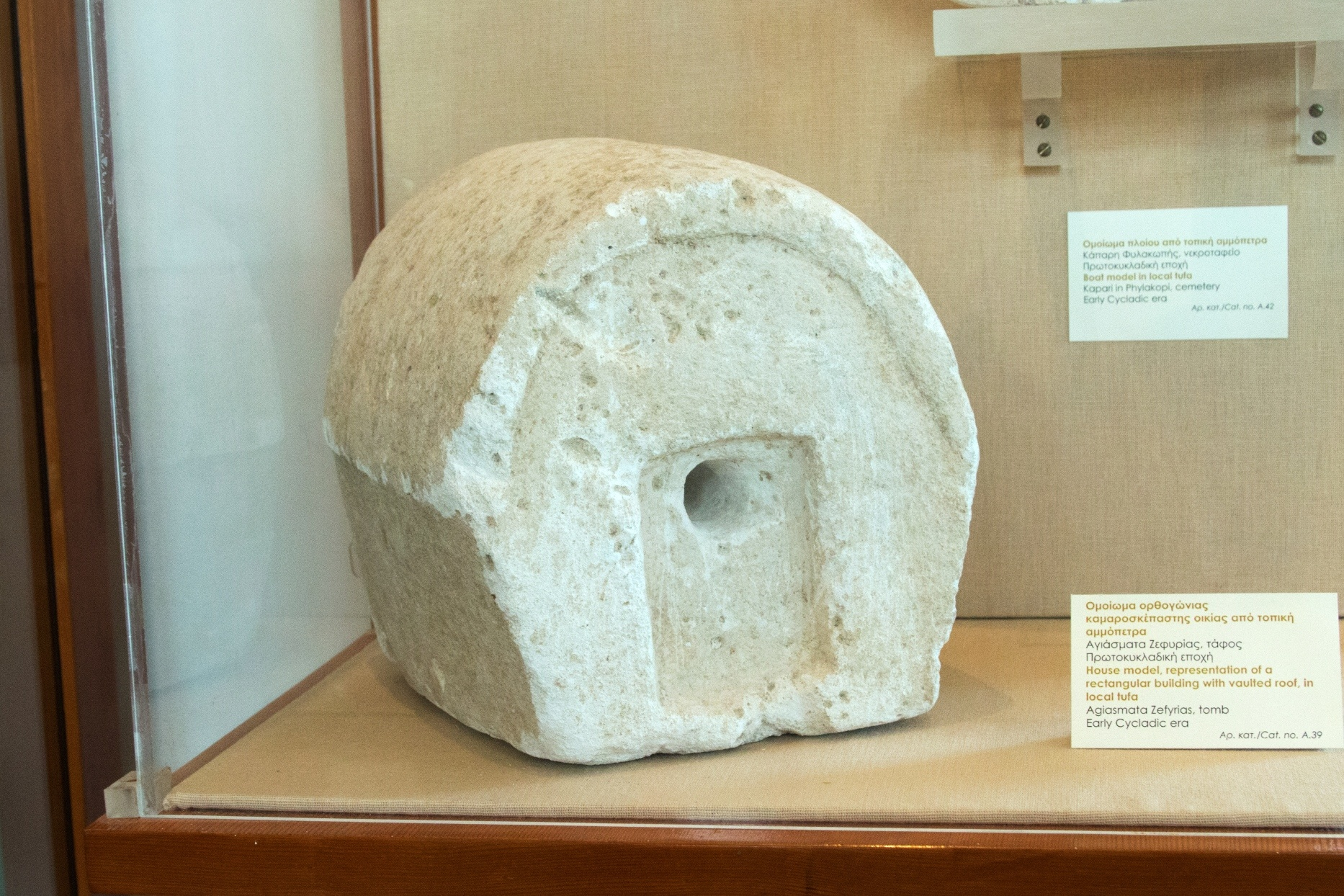
House model, tufa. Early Cycladic era, 3rd millennium BC

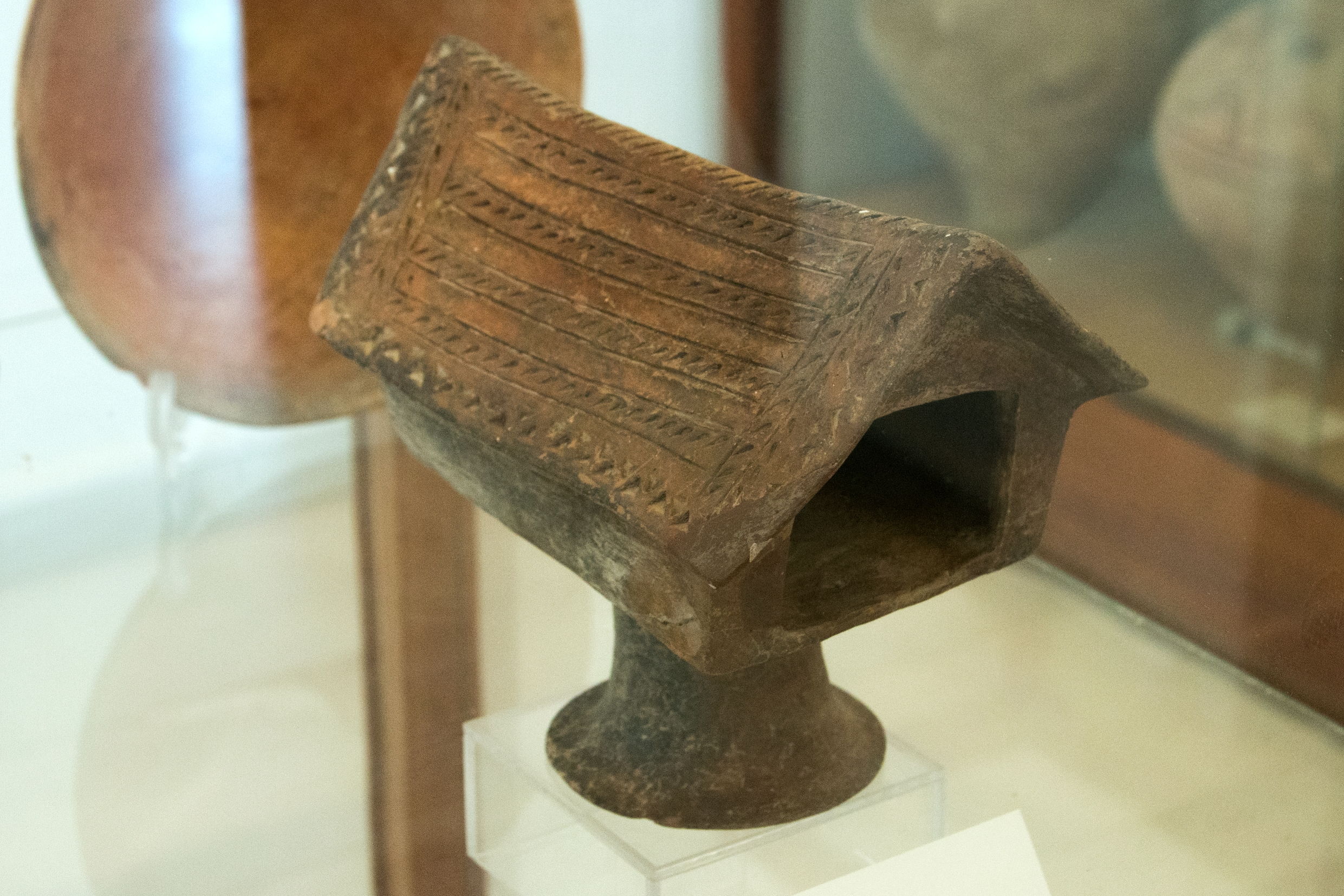
House model, pottery, from Rivari, 2500-2000 BC

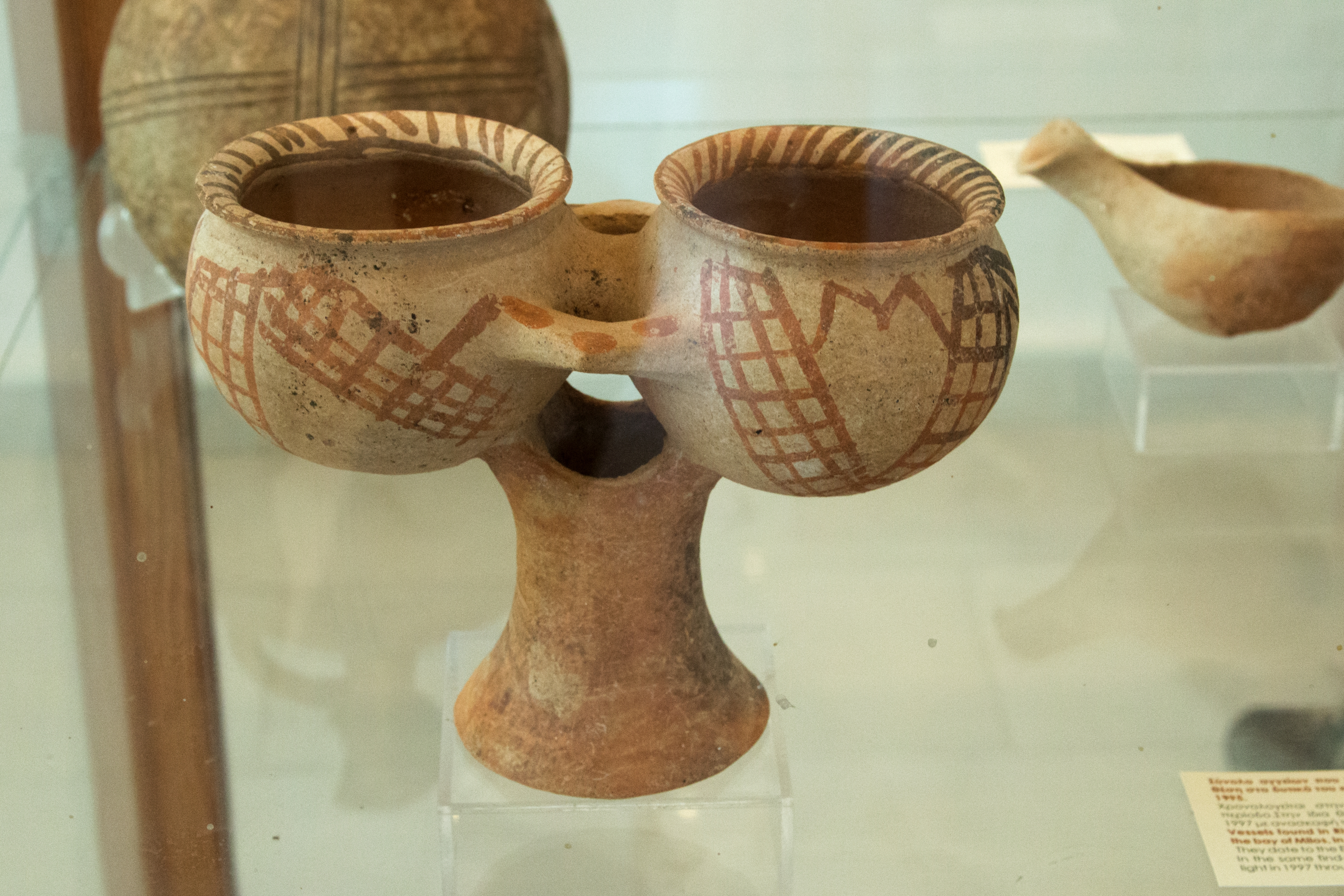
Pottery kernos, Rivari, 2500 to 2000 BC

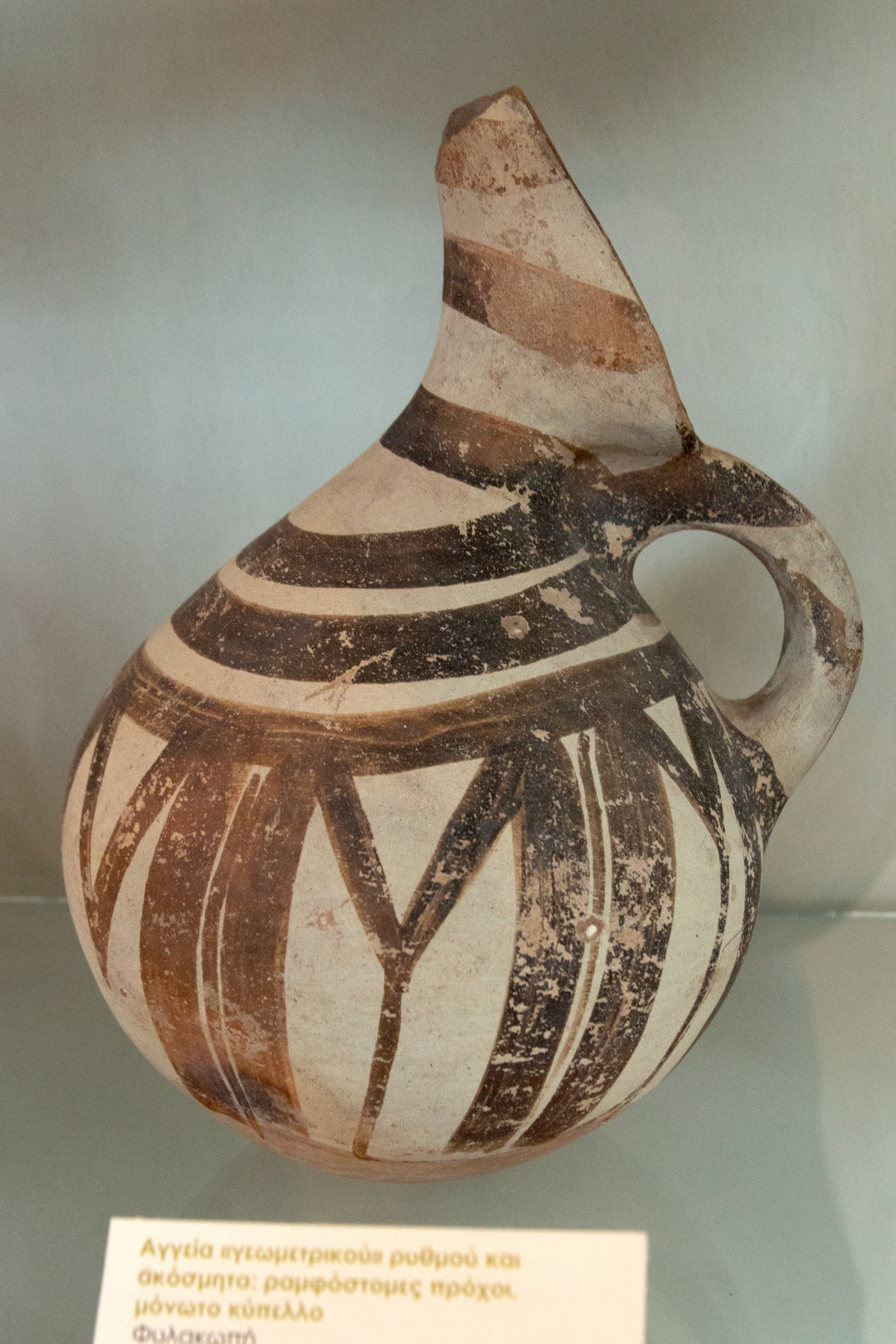
Pottery from Phylakopi, Phylakopi I culture, ca 2200-2000 BC

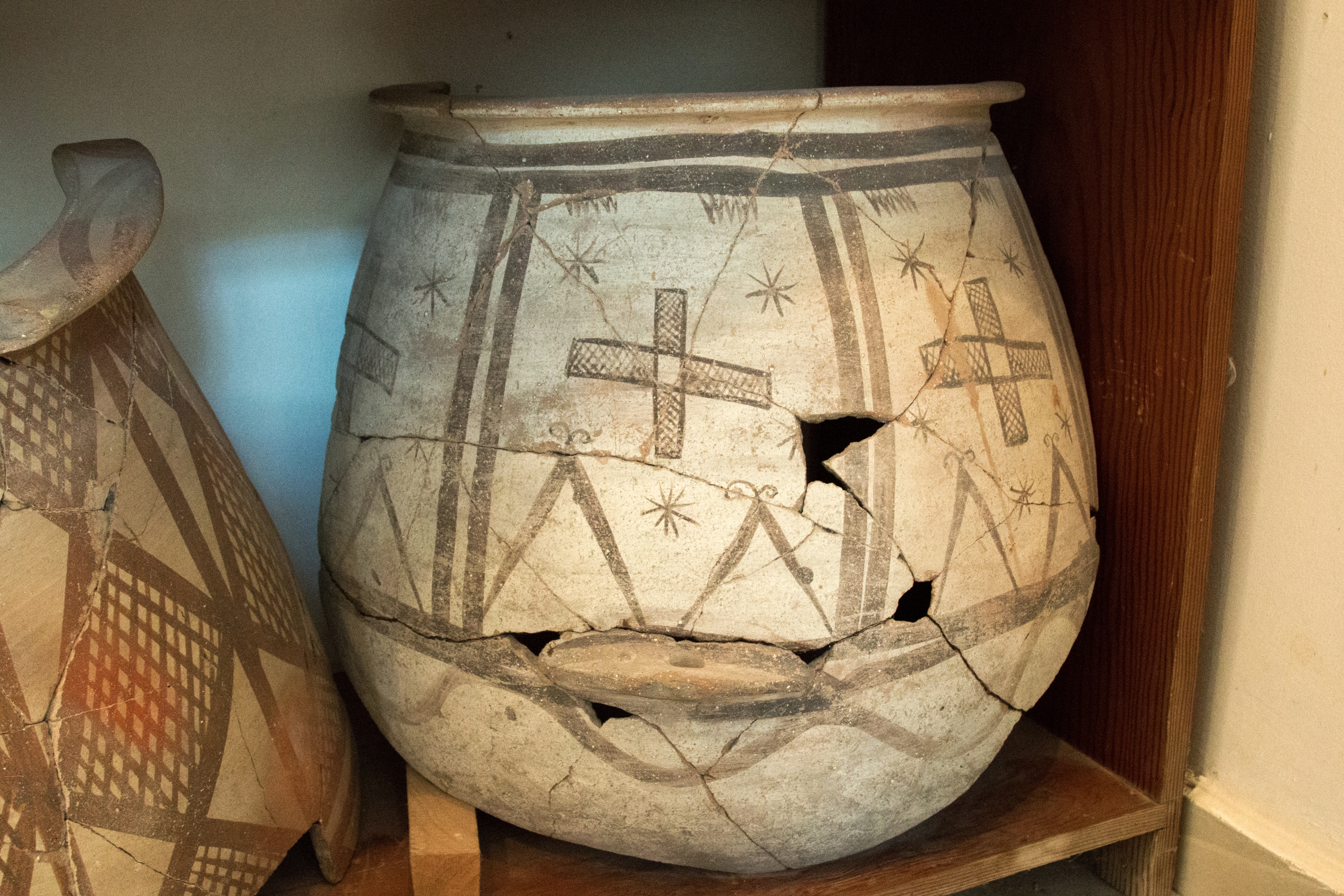
Pottery from Phylakopi, Phylakopi I-II culture, 20th century BC

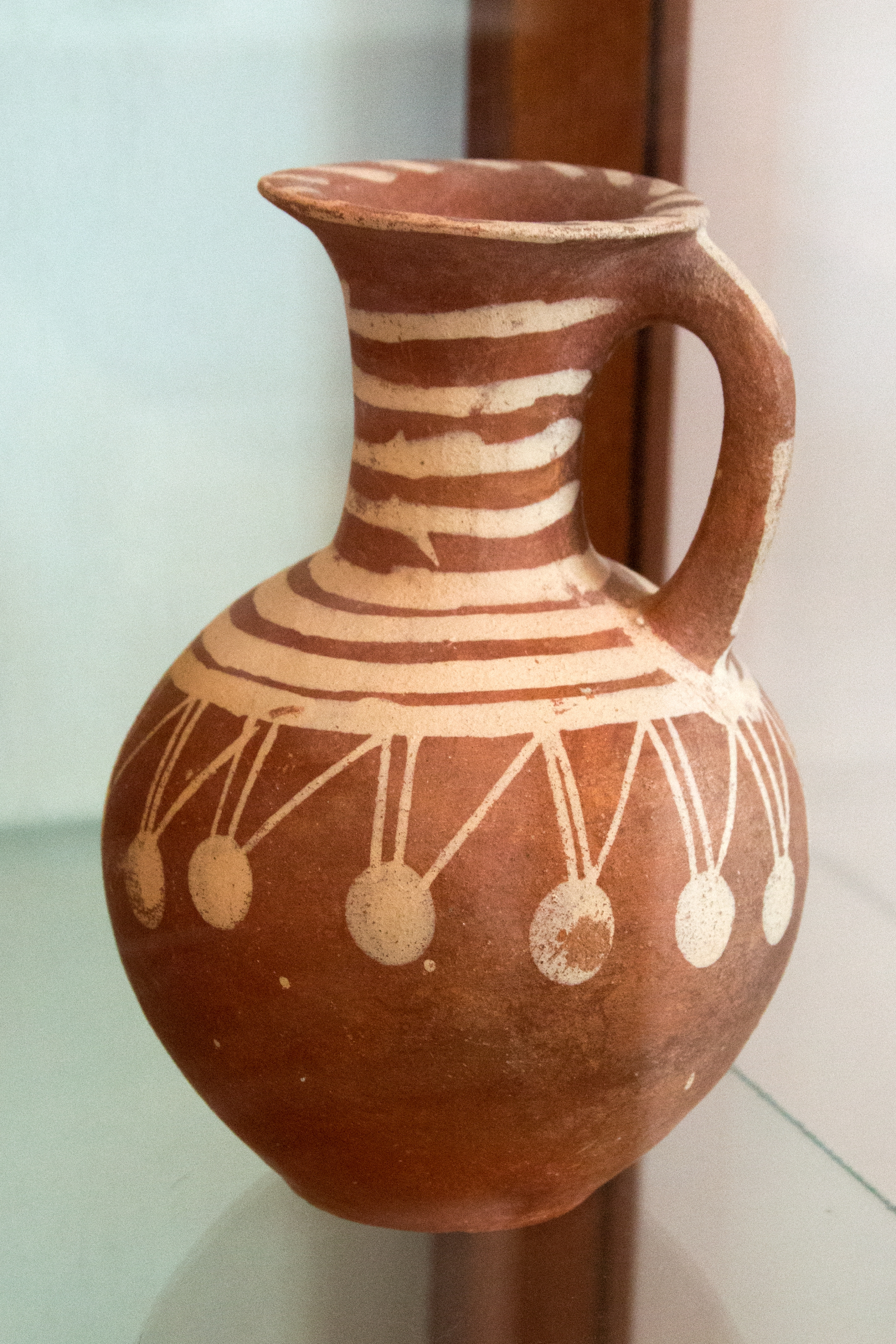
Pottery from Phylakopi, Phylakopi I-II culture, 20th century BC

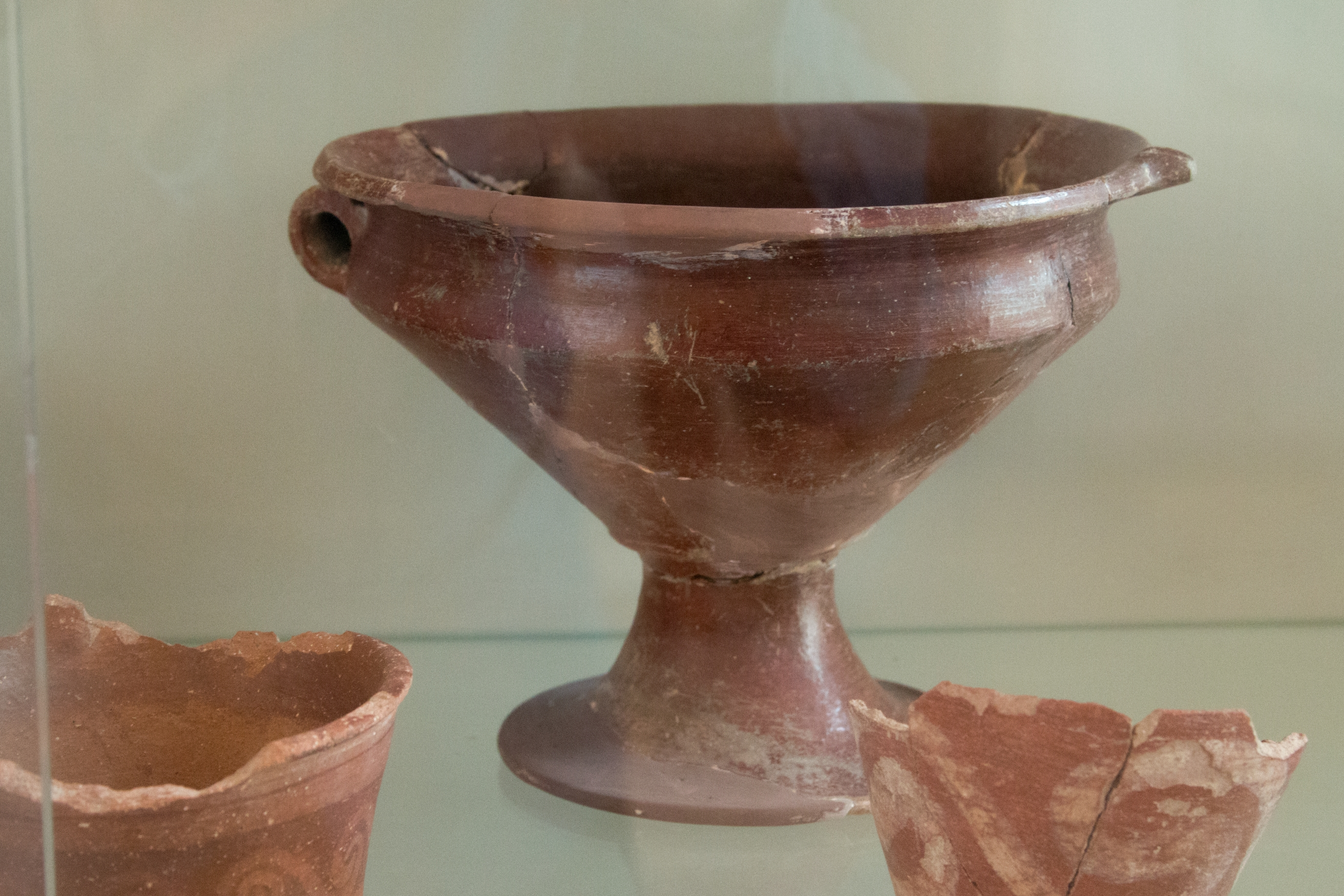
Red-painted goblet from Phylakopi, Phylakopi II culture, middle Bronze Age

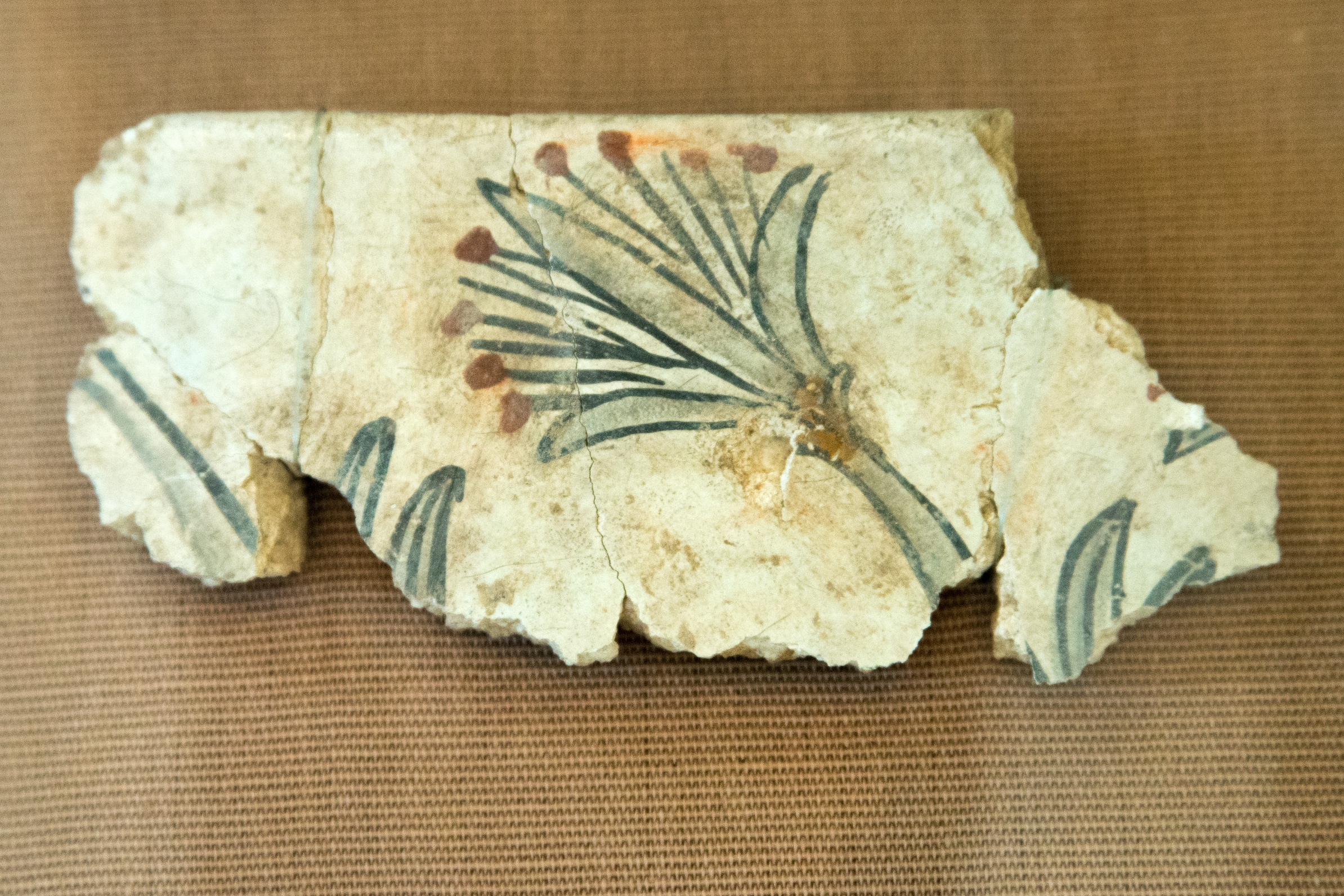
Offering table fragment, Phylakopi III, Late Cycladic I, Minoan influence

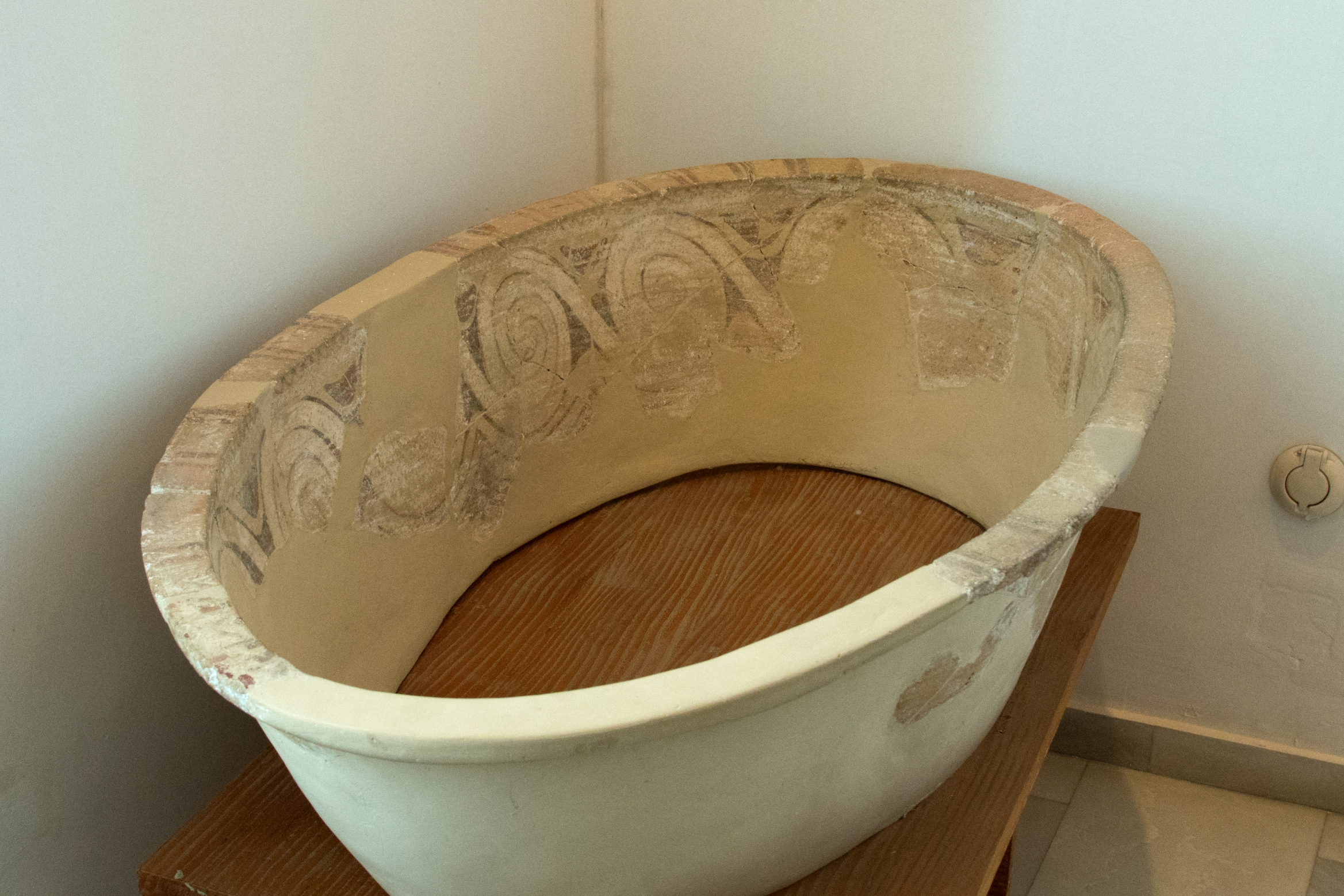
Bath-tub (asaminthos), Phylakopi III, Late Cycladic I, Minoan influence

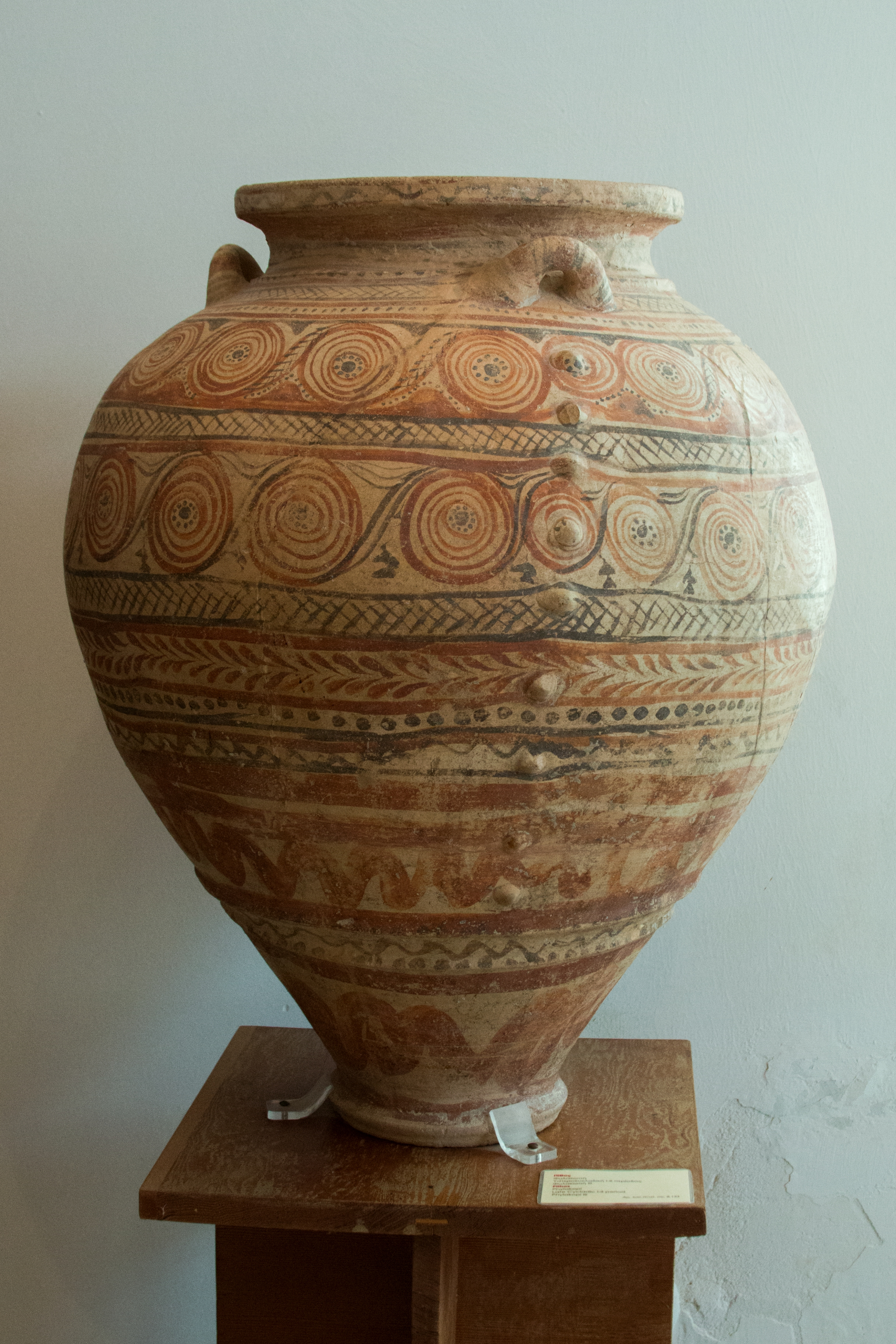
Pithos, Phylakopi III, Minoan influence

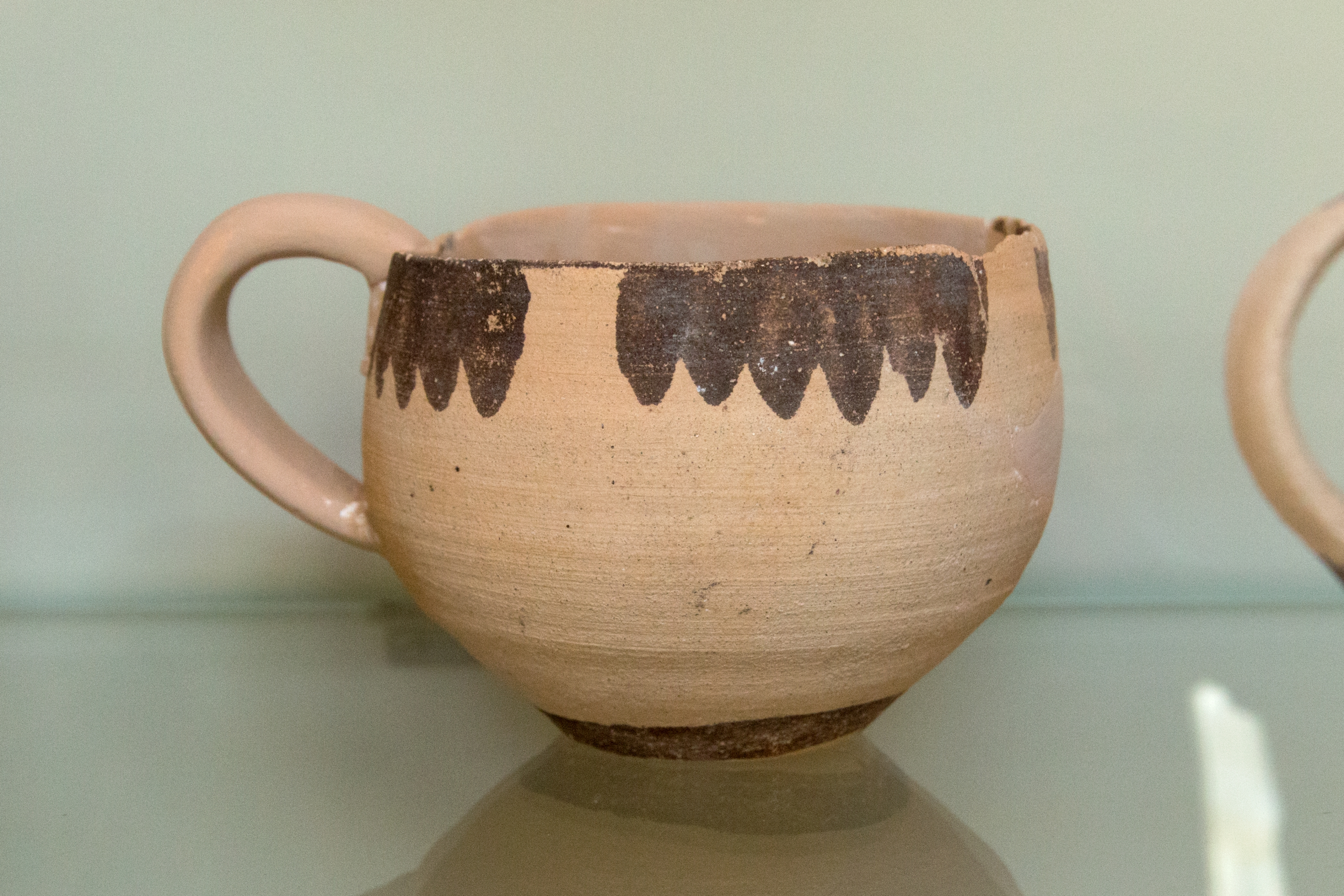
Late Bronze Age Melian pottery, Phylakopi III

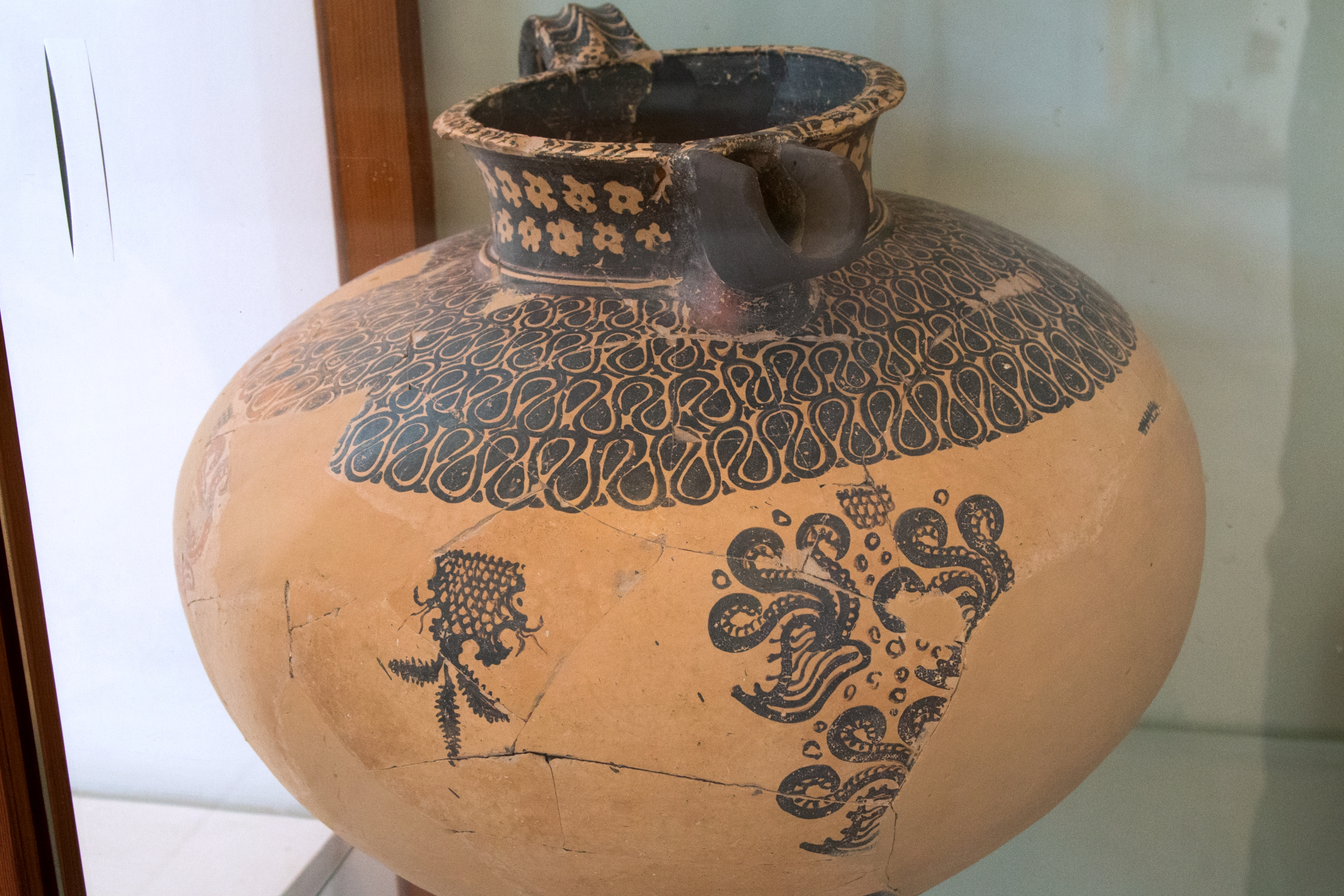
Minoan pottery made in Crete, Phylakopi III

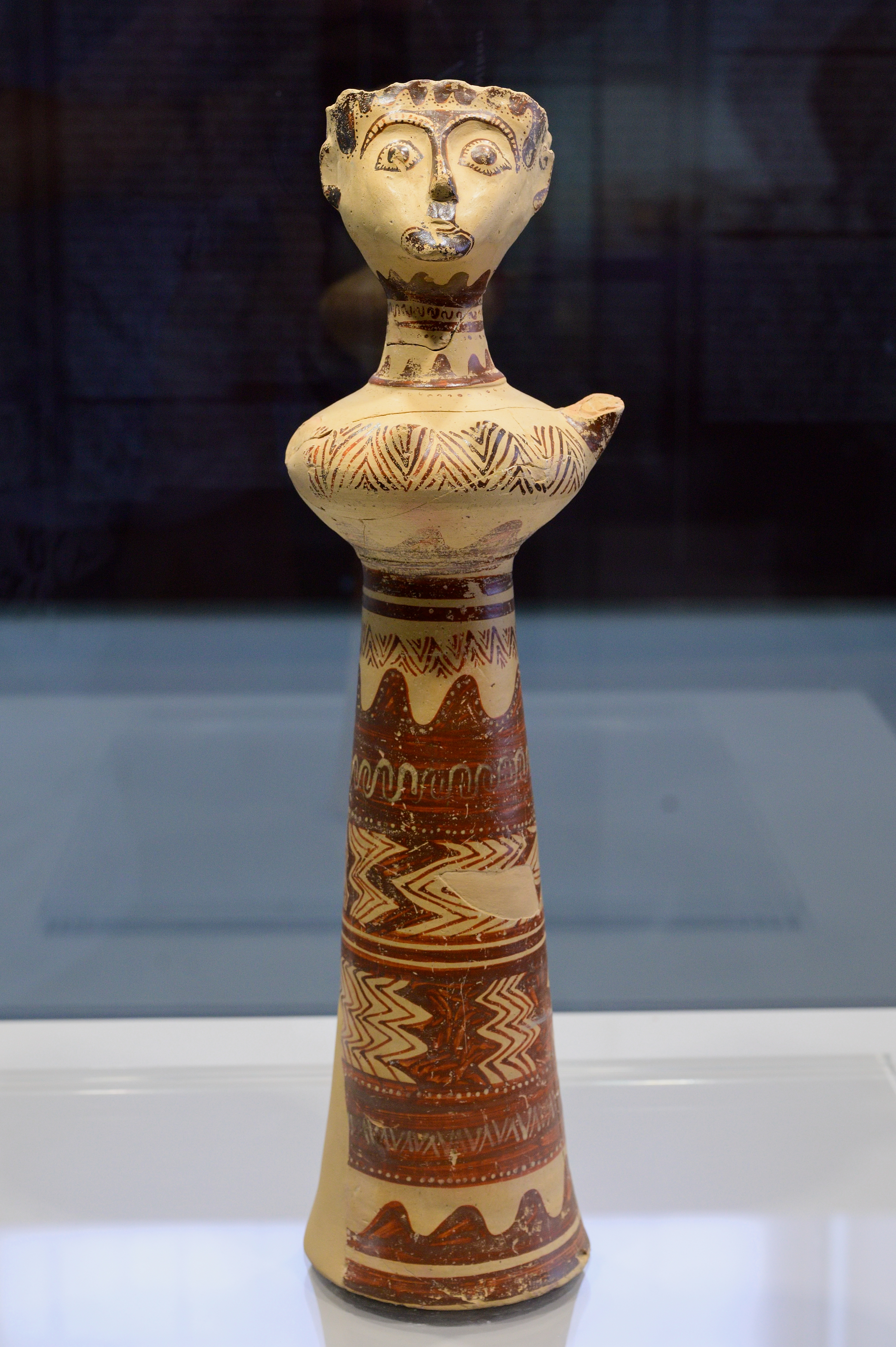
Lady of Phylakopi, from shrine in Phylakopi, Phylakopi III (IV ?), 14th century BC or later

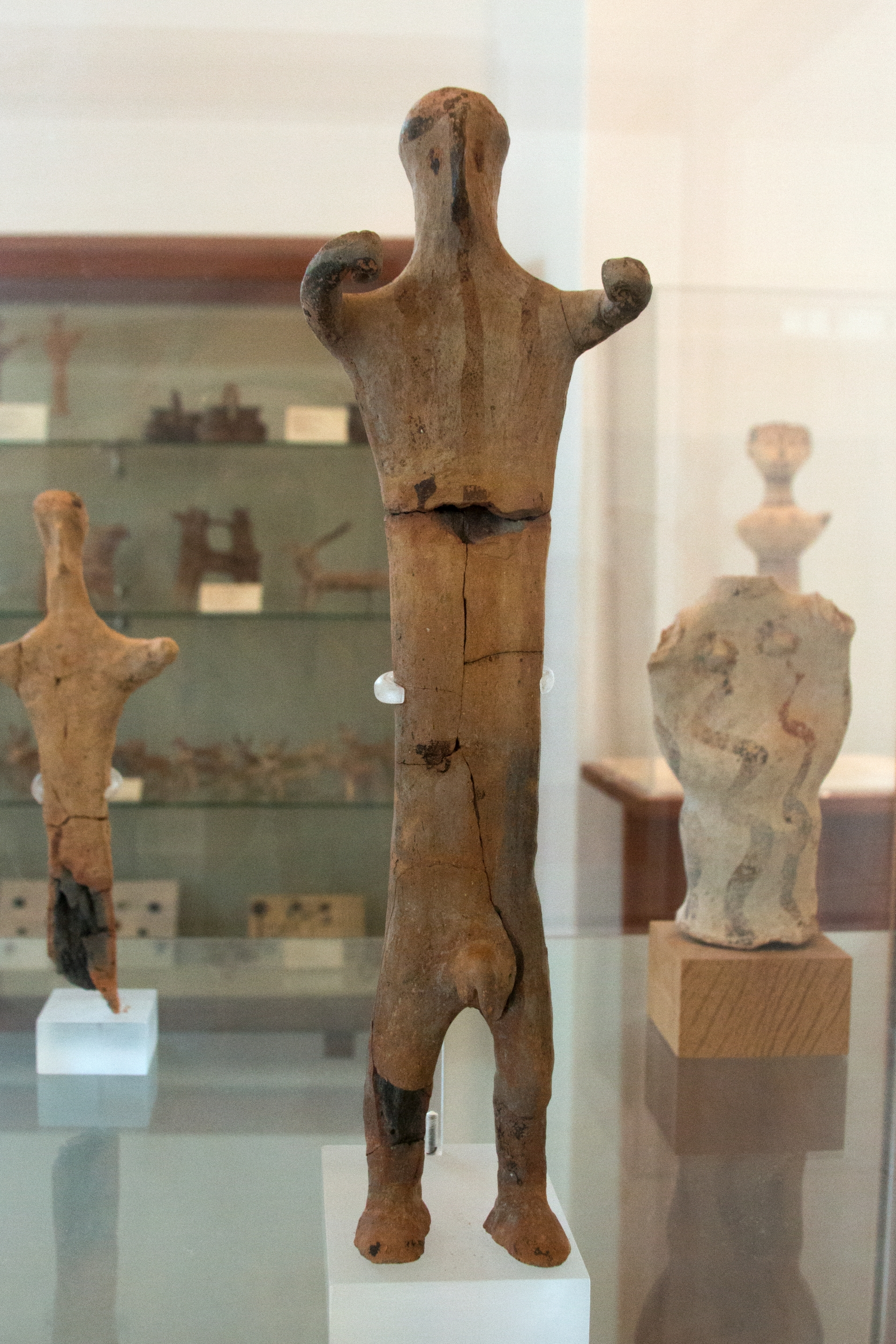
Male figurine from West Shrine in Phylakopi, Phylakopi IV culture, 12th century BC

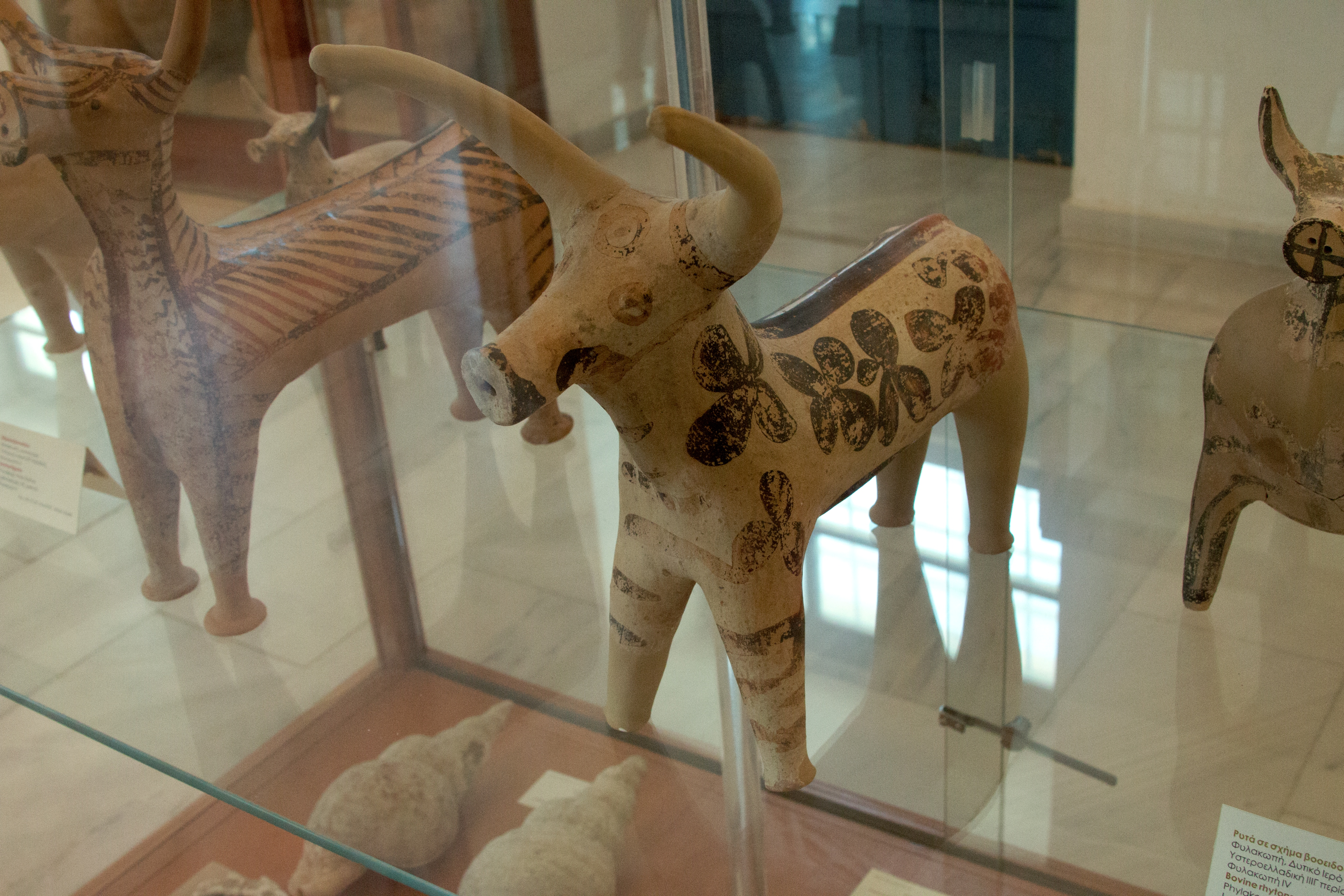
Bull, rom West Shrine in Phylakopi, Fylakopi IV culture, Mycenaean

== Room 3 ==
Ancient Greek pottery.

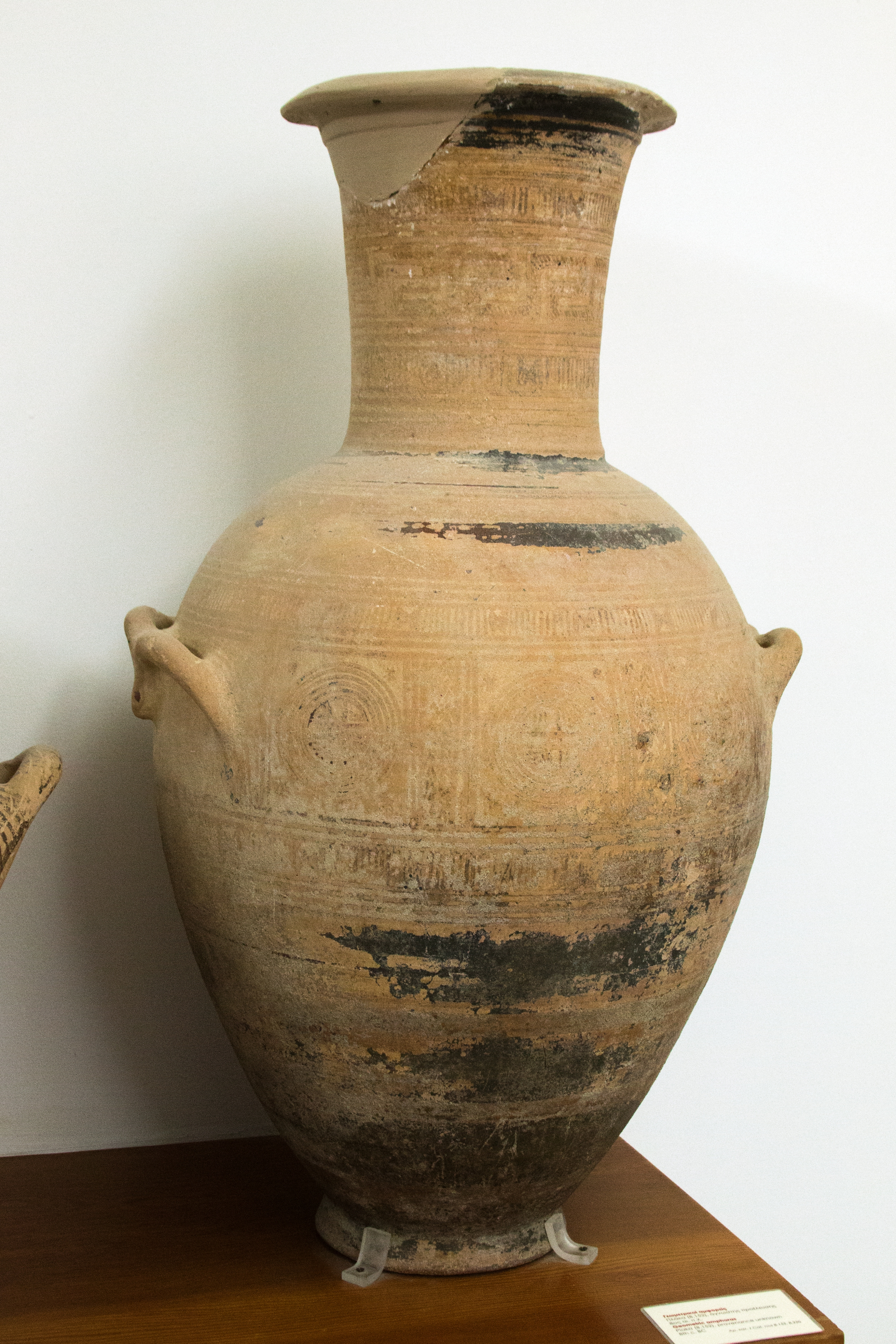
Geometric amphora, 8th century BC

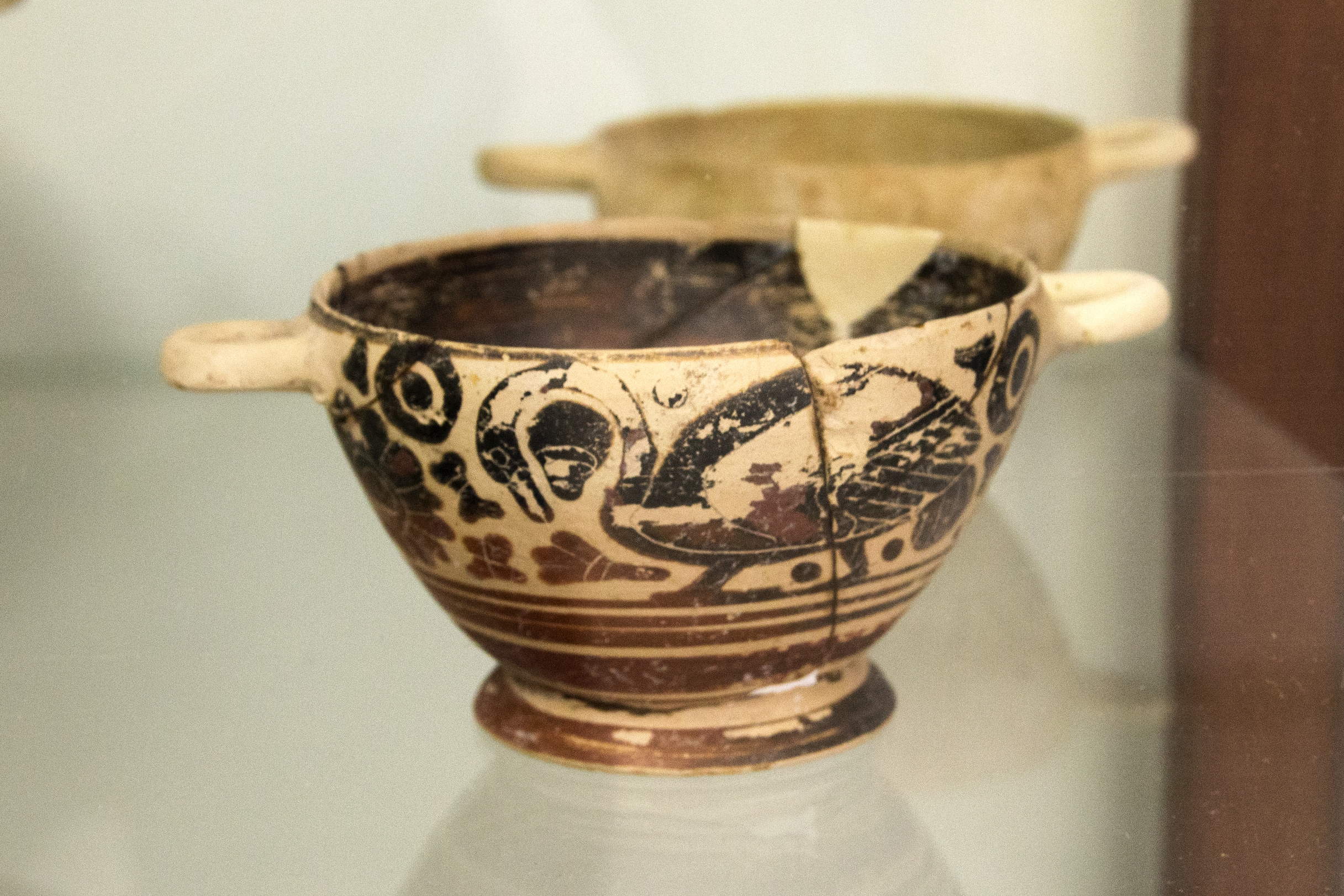
Corinthian pottery

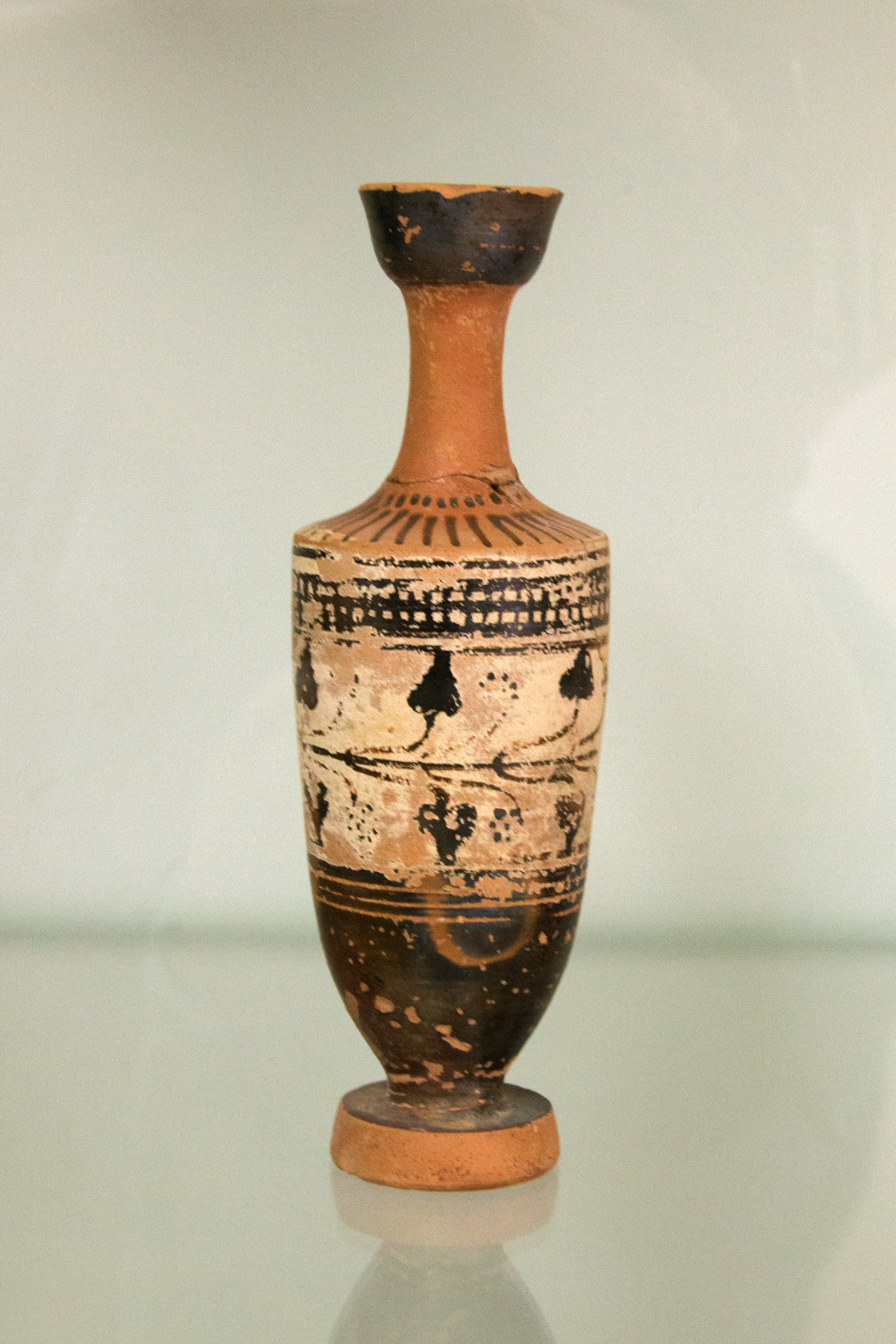
Black-figure lekythos, 6th century BC

== Room 4 ==
Ancient Greek and Roman sculptures. Ancient Greek inscriptions in the local version of the alphabet.

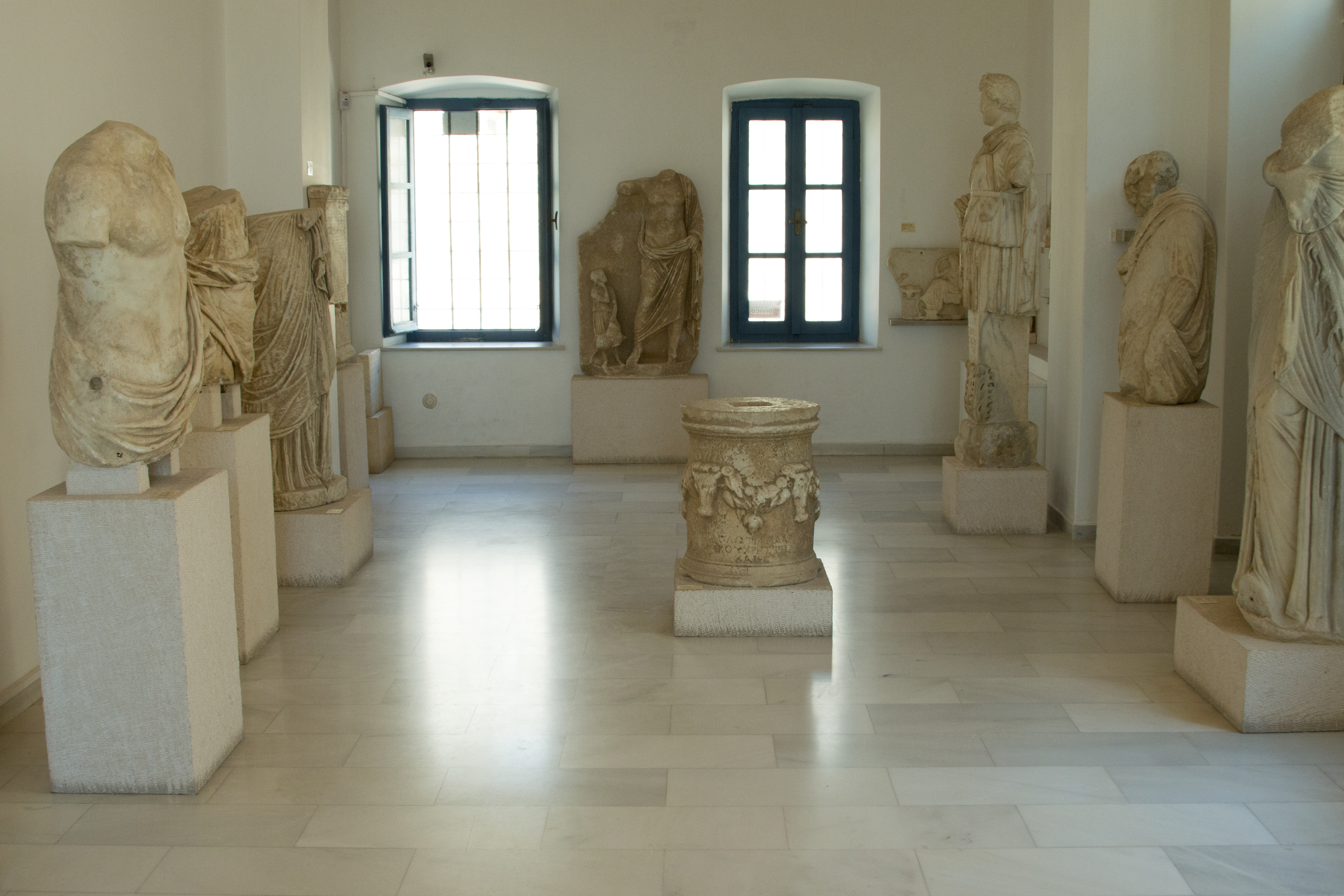

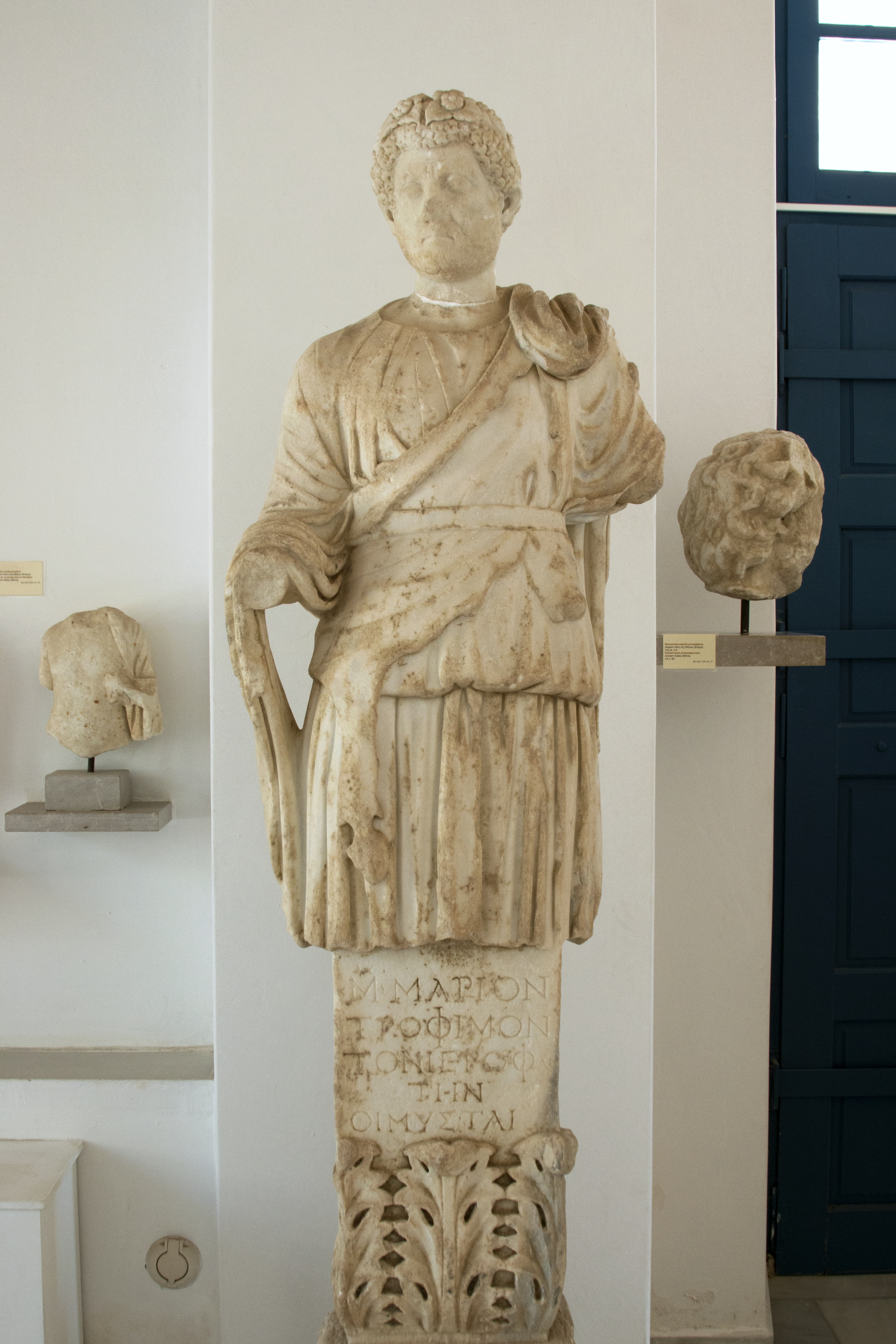
Portrait herm of Marios Trofimos, priest of Dionysos, 2nd century AD

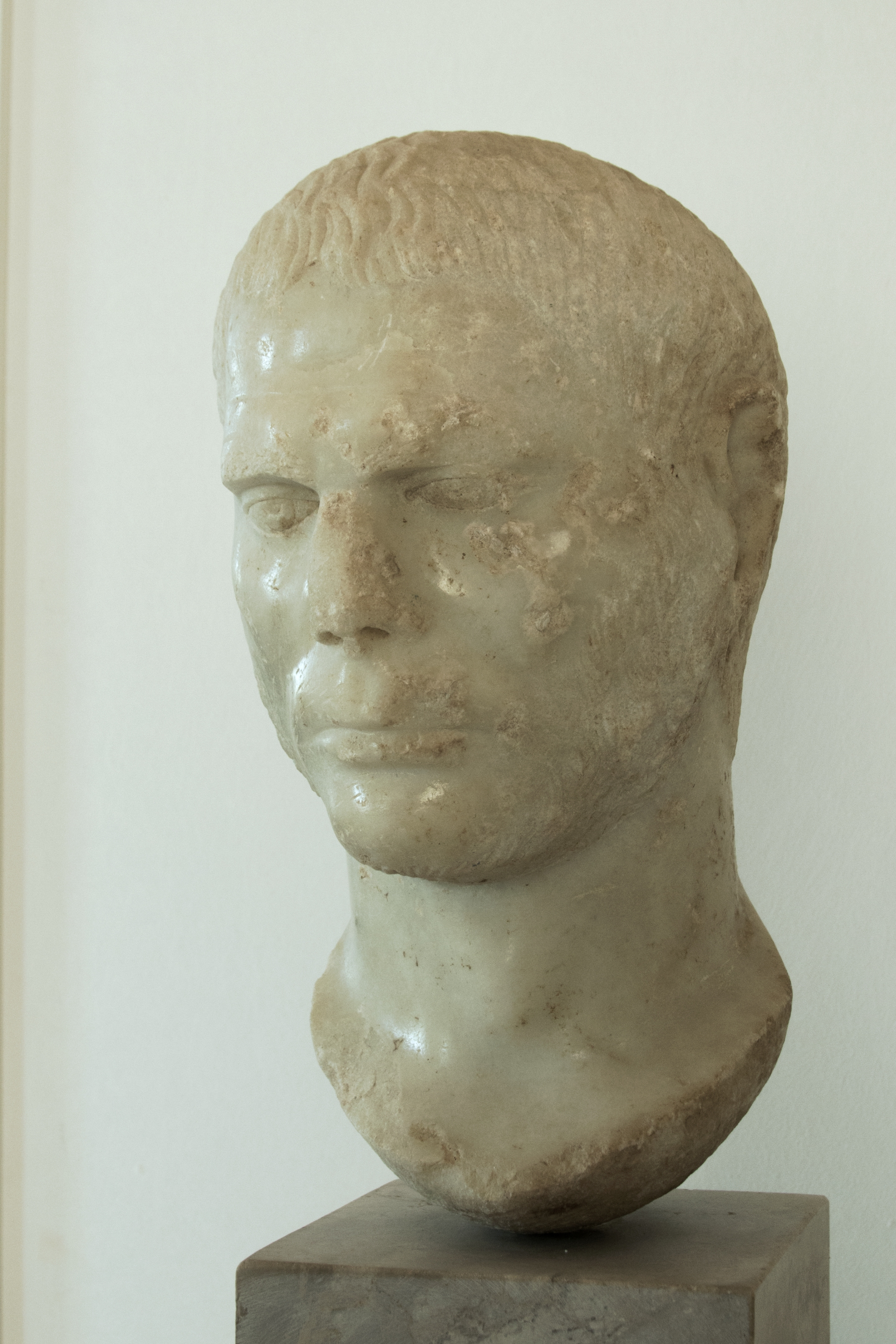
Roman portrait of a man, 3rd century AD
