= Plaka, Milos =

Village in Greece, capital of Milos municipality

Plaka, Milos Πλάκα, Μήλος
- Community
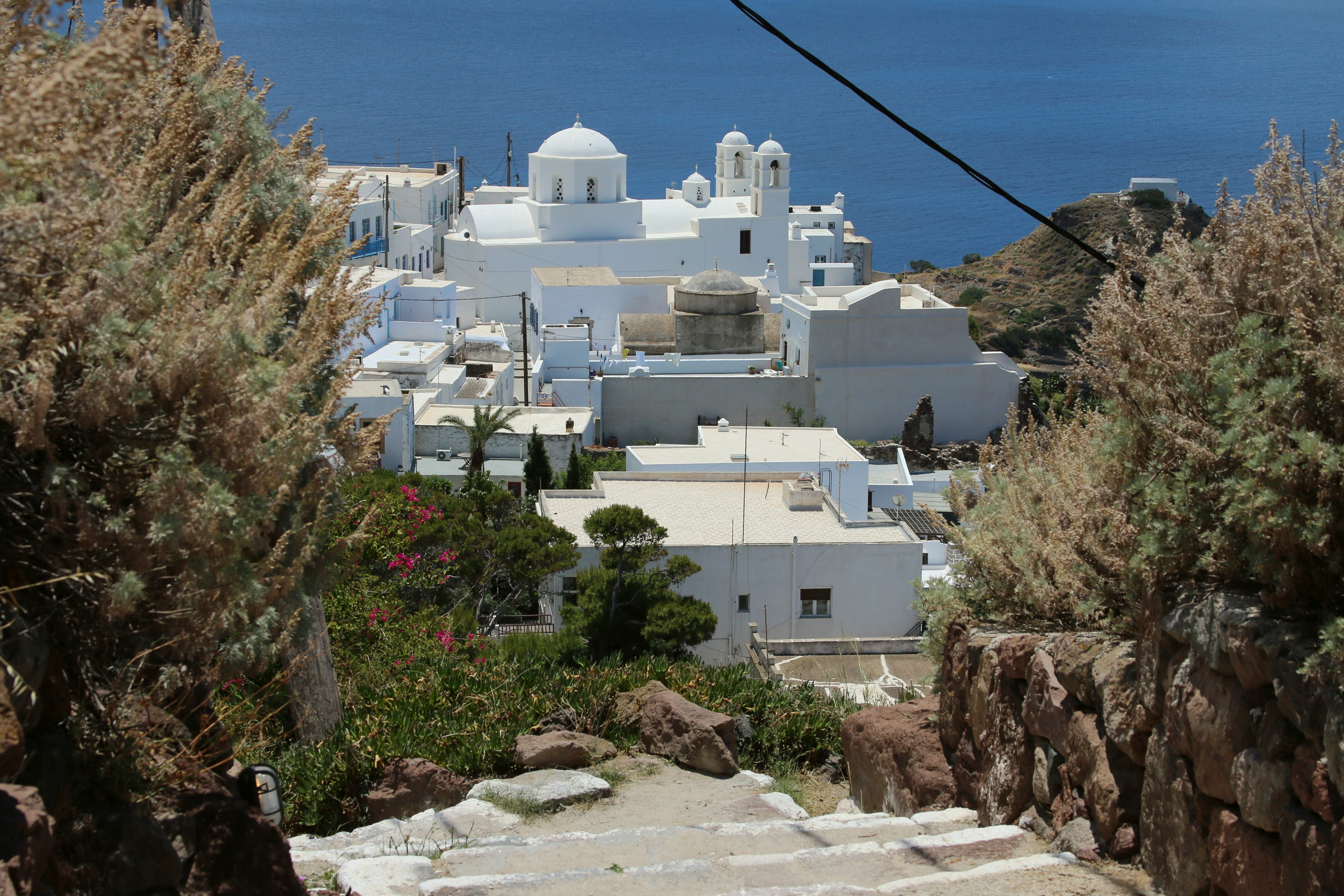

- Location within Greece
- Coordinates: 36°44′30″N 24°25′45″E
- Country: Greece
- Administrative region: South Aegean
- Regional unit: Milos
- Municipality: Milos

Population (2021)
  - Community: 902
- Time zone: UTC+2 (EET)
  - Summer (DST): UTC+3 (EEST)

Plaka (official name: Milos) is the chief town in Milos, a Greek island in the Cyclades group. It is perched on the top of large rock, overlooking the gulf of Milos. No cars can enter the village because of the narrow spaces between walls and buildings. Motorbikes, mopeds and the like are the only usable vehicles. Population 902 (2021).
