= Coil winding technology =

Manufacture of electromagnetic coils

In electrical engineering, coil winding is the manufacture of electromagnetic coils. Coils are used as components of circuits, and to provide the magnetic field of motors, transformers, and generators, and in the manufacture of loudspeakers and microphones. The shape and dimensions of a winding are designed to fulfill the particular purpose. Parameters such as inductance, Q factor, insulation strength, and strength of the desired magnetic field greatly influence the design of coil windings. Coil winding can be structured into several groups regarding the type and geometry of the wound coil. Mass production of electromagnetic coils relies on automated machinery.

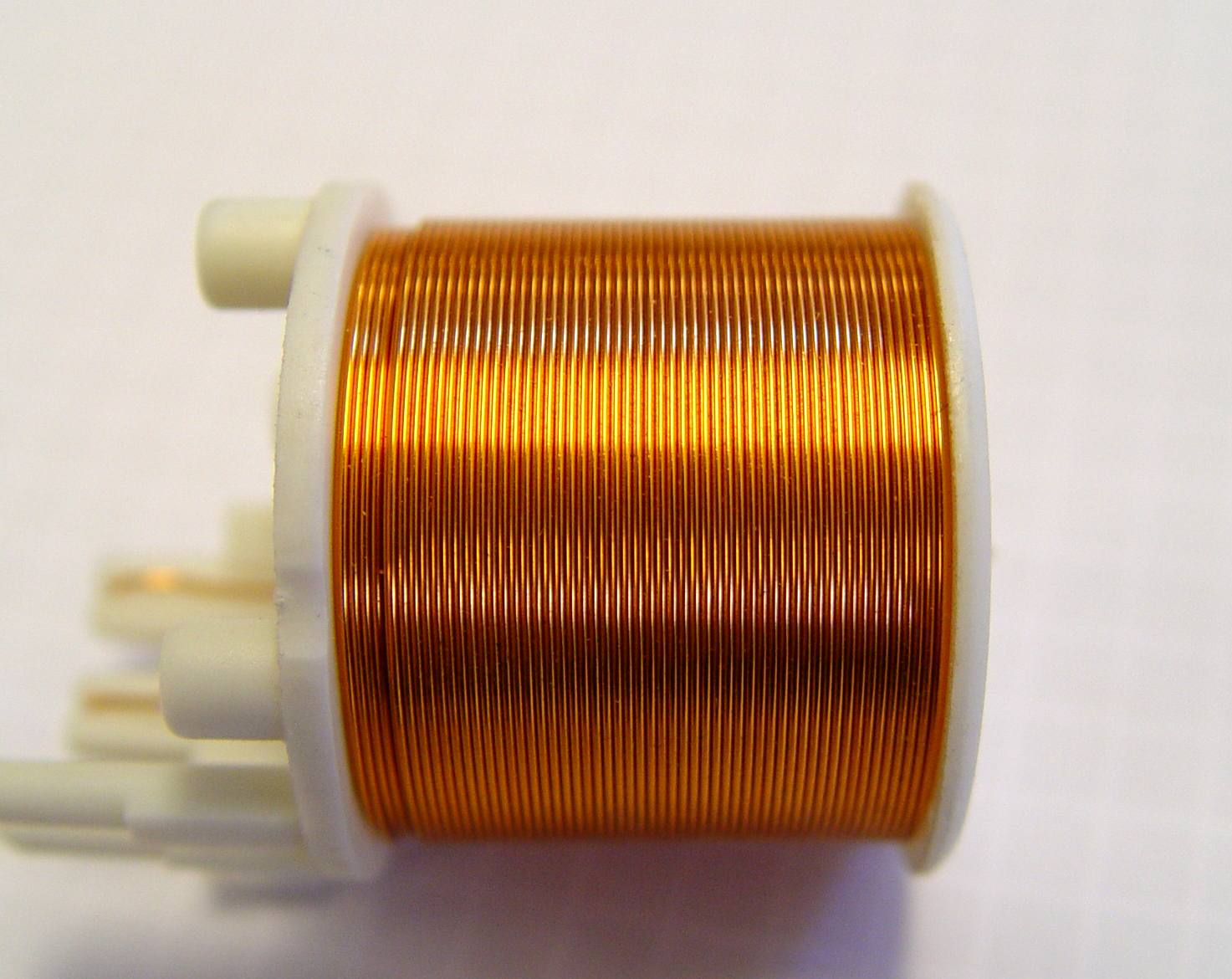
Coil

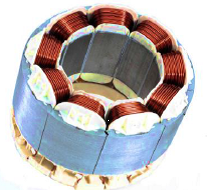
Stator

== Terminology related to electric machines ==
This article is about coil winding technology and much of the article is specific to electric machines. This section provides definitions of terms used later in the article.

=== Rotor and stator ===
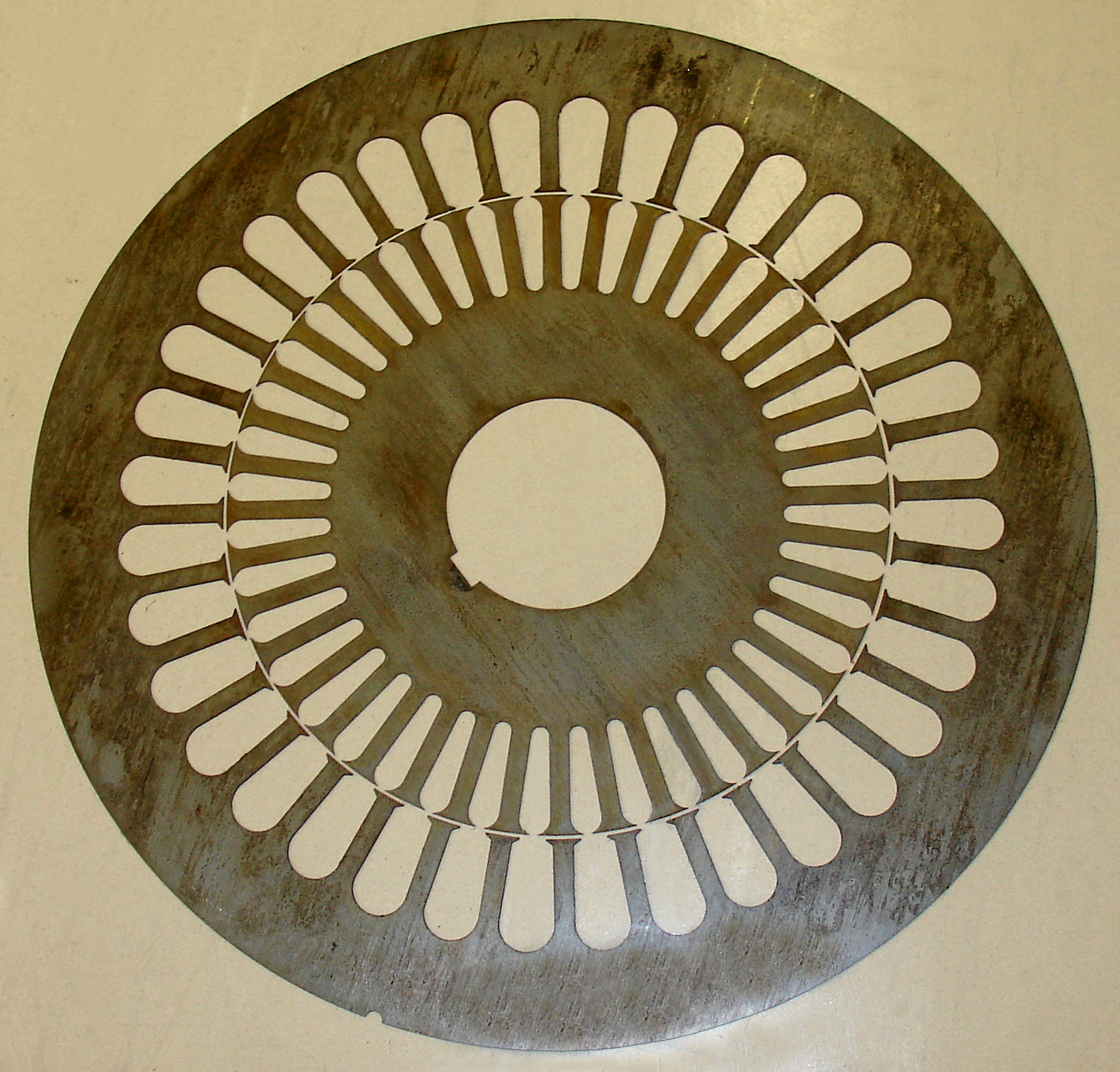
Corresponding laminations for the rotor and the stator are stamped from the same sheet of electrical steel. The rotor has 40 slots and teeth. The stator has 36 slots and teeth. A very narrow gap separates the rotor and stator. The teeth widen and the slots narrow at the gap. The wide part is called a tooth shoe.

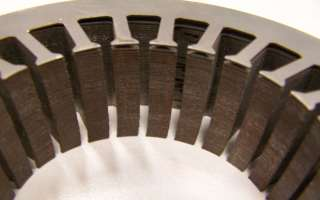
Laminations after assembly into a stator

An electric motor or generator consists of a cylinderical rotating part called the rotor and a stationary part called the stator. For maximum efficiency, a gap between the rotor and stator is kept as small as possible, typically 1–2 mm.

For most AC generators, the stator acts as the armature, and the rotor acts as the field magnet.

=== Laminations ===
The rotor and stator are both assembled from a stack of laminations stamped from sheets of electrical steel, typically 1 mm thick. The laminations are designed to minimize eddy currents, which would otherwise waste energy and create heat.

=== Slots and teeth ===
Windings consist of insulated conductors, which pass through slots cut along the axis of the stator. The spaces between the slots are called teeth. The shape of the slots and teeth depends upon the design of the electric machine. Slots may be rectangular, they may taper, they may be circular, etc.

The wider part at the end of the tooth is called a tooth shoe.

Some authors use the term "groove" to mean the same thing as slot. In this article, the term groove refers to the indentations between parallel conductors in a layer of a winding.

=== Poles ===
Pole means magnetic pole, and poles always come in pairs, usually referred to as "North" and "south." Poles may be physical objects in fixed places, or poles may be virtual objects moving as the machine operates. A pole may be a single piece of magnetic material, or a pole may be distributed over multiple teeth.

=== Electrical degrees ===
A rotor makes a complete rotation in 360 degrees. That amounts to 180 degrees to pass by each pole of a two pole machine. The current in conductors also goes through a complete cycle in 360 degrees.

For a four pole machine, each pole spans only 90 degrees. During the 90 degrees the current in a conductor goes through a half cycle, or 180 degrees. Because there are four poles, and 4 × 180 = 720, the conductors go through two complete cycles for each complete turn of the rotor.

To distinguish between the mechanical movement of the rotor, and electrical activity in conductors, the terms mechanical degrees and electrical degrees are used.

- mechanical degrees indicate the amount the rotor has turned about its shaft.
- electrical degrees indicate the amount the currents in conductors has changed.

In general, electrical degrees equals mechanical degrees times 1/2 the number of poles.

No matter how many poles, each pole always spans exactly 180 electrical degrees, and it is called pole pitch.

Electrical degrees and mechanical degrees are related as follows:

$$\text{electrical degrees} = \frac{P }{2}\cdot \text{mechanical degrees}$$

where P is the number of poles.

== Principles ==
Efficient coils minimise the materials and volume required for a given purpose. The ratio of the area of electrical conductors, to the provided winding space is called "fill factor". Since round wires will always have some gap, and wires also have some space required for insulation between turns and between layers, the fill factor is always smaller than one. To achieve higher fill factors, rectangular or flat wire can be used.

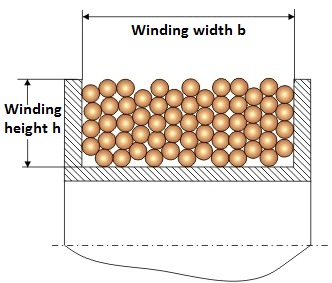
fill factor

The fill factor can be calculated from:

$$F = \frac{d^2 \cdot \frac{\pi}{4}\cdot n }{b\cdot h}$$

$d$ - Wire gauge including the varnish insulation
$n$ - Number of windings
$b \cdot h$ - Cross section of the coil body

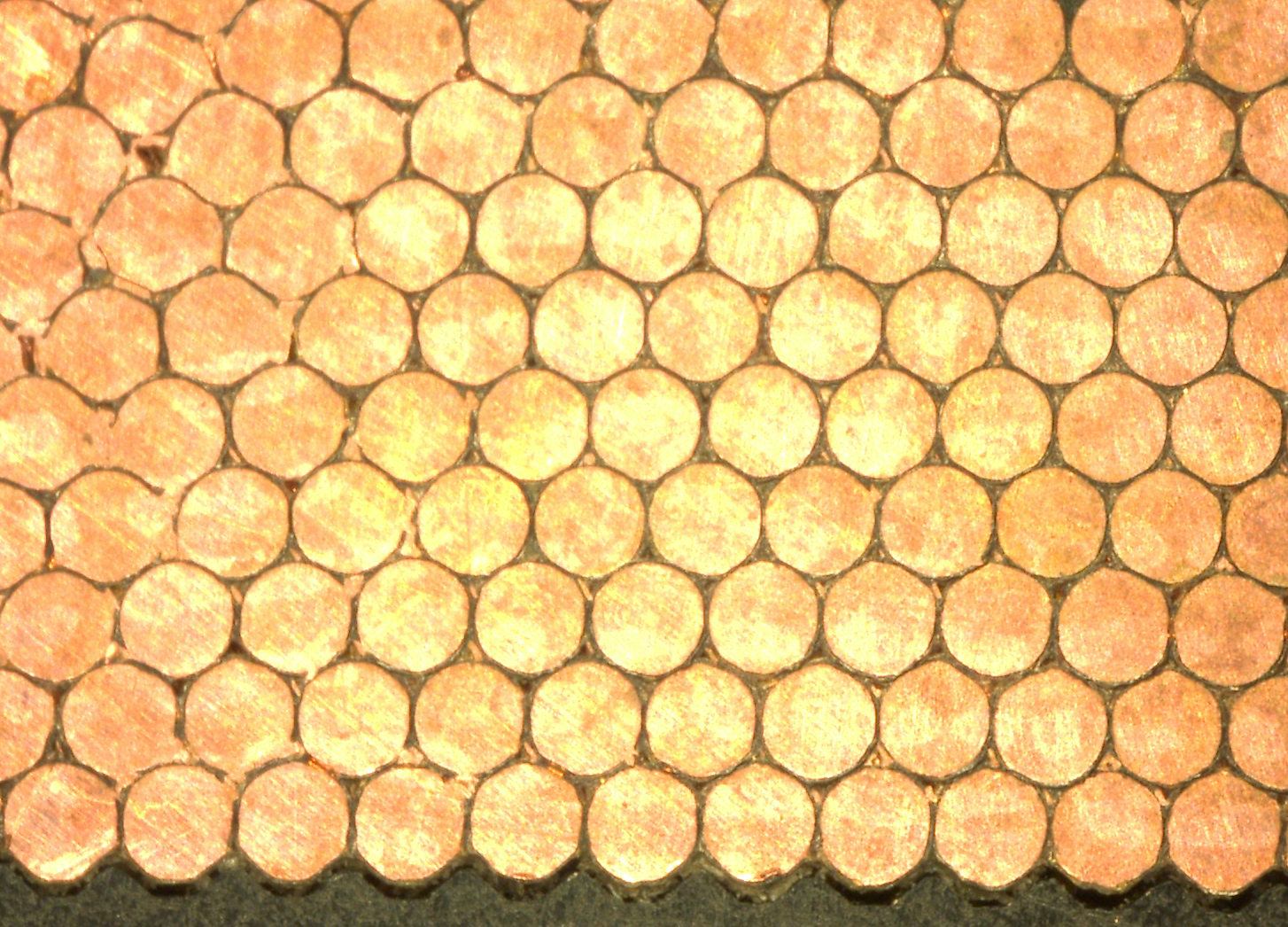
Polished cut image of orthocyclic winding

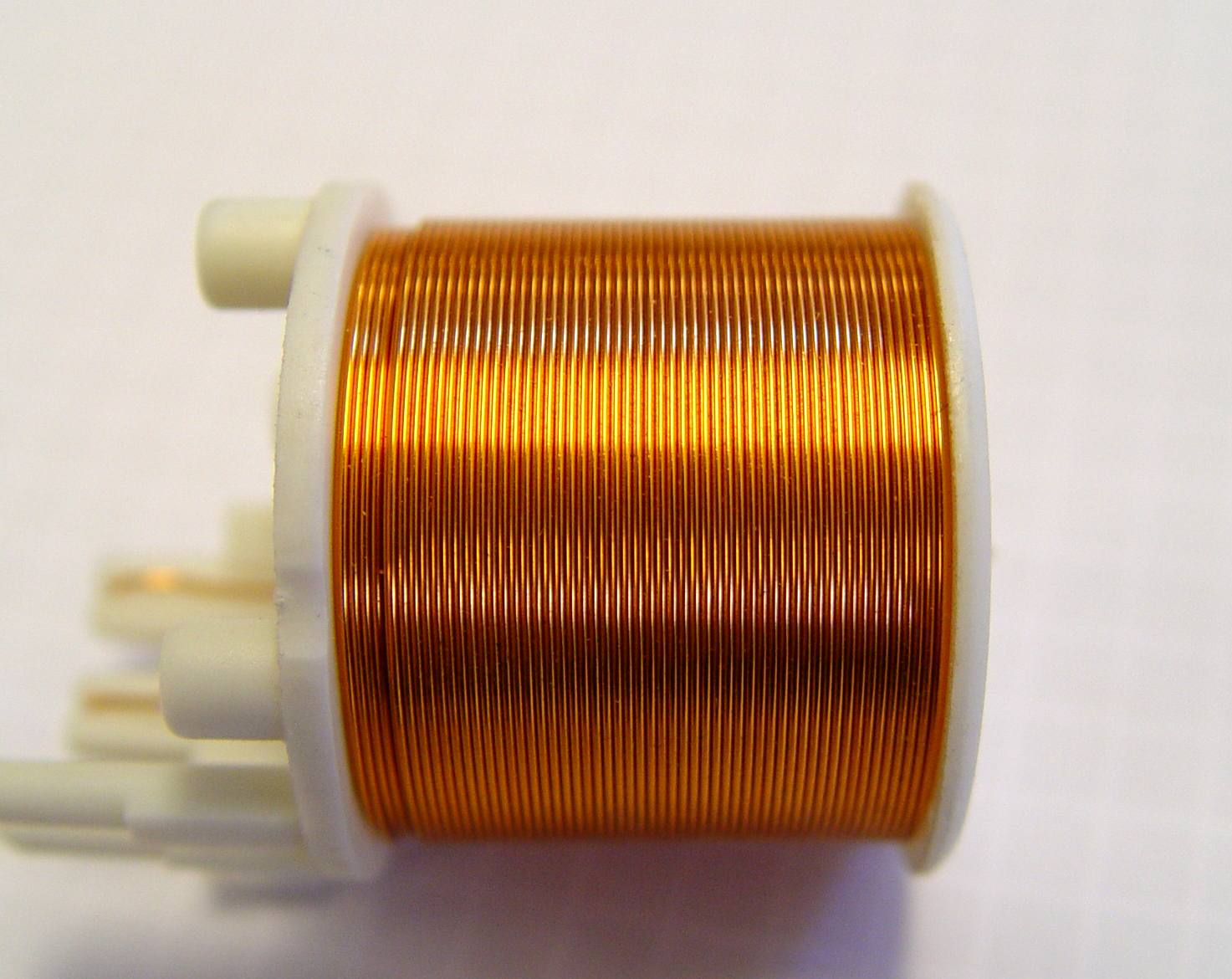
orthocyclic wound round coil

Dense packing of wires reduces air space, and is said to have a high fill factor. This increases the efficiency of the electrical device and an improved heat conductivity of the winding. For best packing of round wires on a multi-layer winding, the wires in the upper layer are in the grooves of the lower layer for at least 300 degrees of the coil circumference. The wires occupy a dense package which is called “orthocyclic winding”. The opposite of this would be a random wire structure within the winding space, which is called “wild winding.”

=== Wild winding ===
Also known as jumble winding, with this type of winding structure only poor fill factors can be achieved. The random wire placement leads to a wider distribution of resulting wire length on the coil body and consequently a wider range of electric coil resistances. Despite its disadvantages, it is common in mass production. It is characterized by low demands for machinery and operator and can be wound with very high speeds. Wild windings are mostly applied in contactor- and relay coils, small transformers, Ignition coils, small electrical motors, and generally devices with relatively small wire gauges up to 0.05 mm. Achieved fill factors with the use of round wires are about 73% to 80% and are lower compared to orthocyclic windings with 90%.

The winding height can be estimated using the formula:

$$h = d^2 \cdot \frac {n}{b}$$

$d$ - Wire gauge including the insulation
$n$ - Number of windings
$b$ - Width of winding

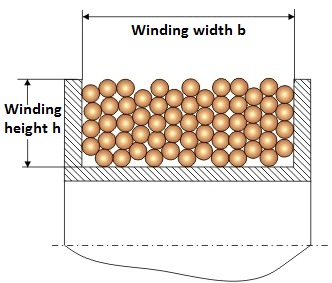
Wild Winding

=== Helical winding ===
Helical winding

The wires are placed helically in every layer. Owing to the direction of movement from layer to layer changing between right-hand and left-hand, the wires cross and locate themselves within the gap of the layer underneath. A wire guiding of the lower layer is not existent. If the number of layers exceeds a certain limit the structuredness cannot be maintained and a wild winding is created. This can be prevented with the use of a separate layer insulation, which is needed anyway when the voltage difference between the layers exceeds the breakdown voltage of the wire insulation.

=== Orthocyclic winding ===
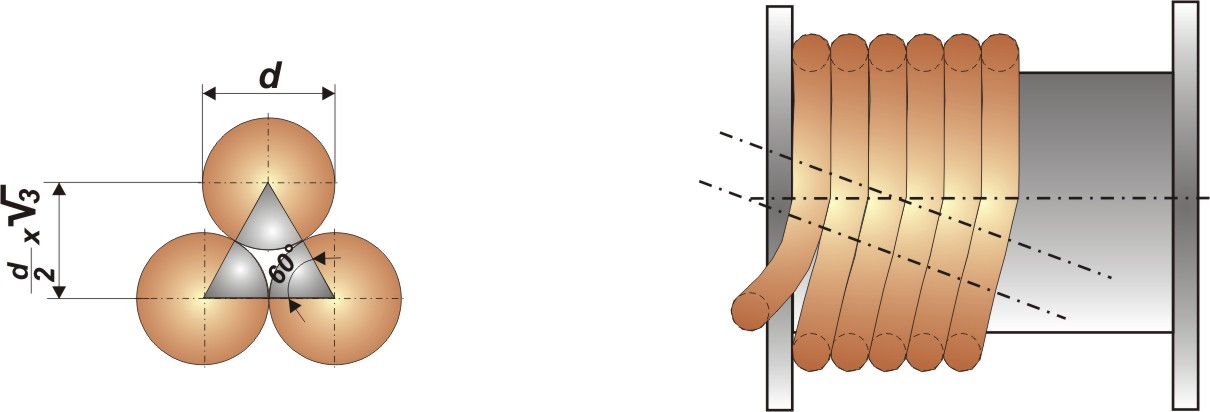
Orthocyclic winding

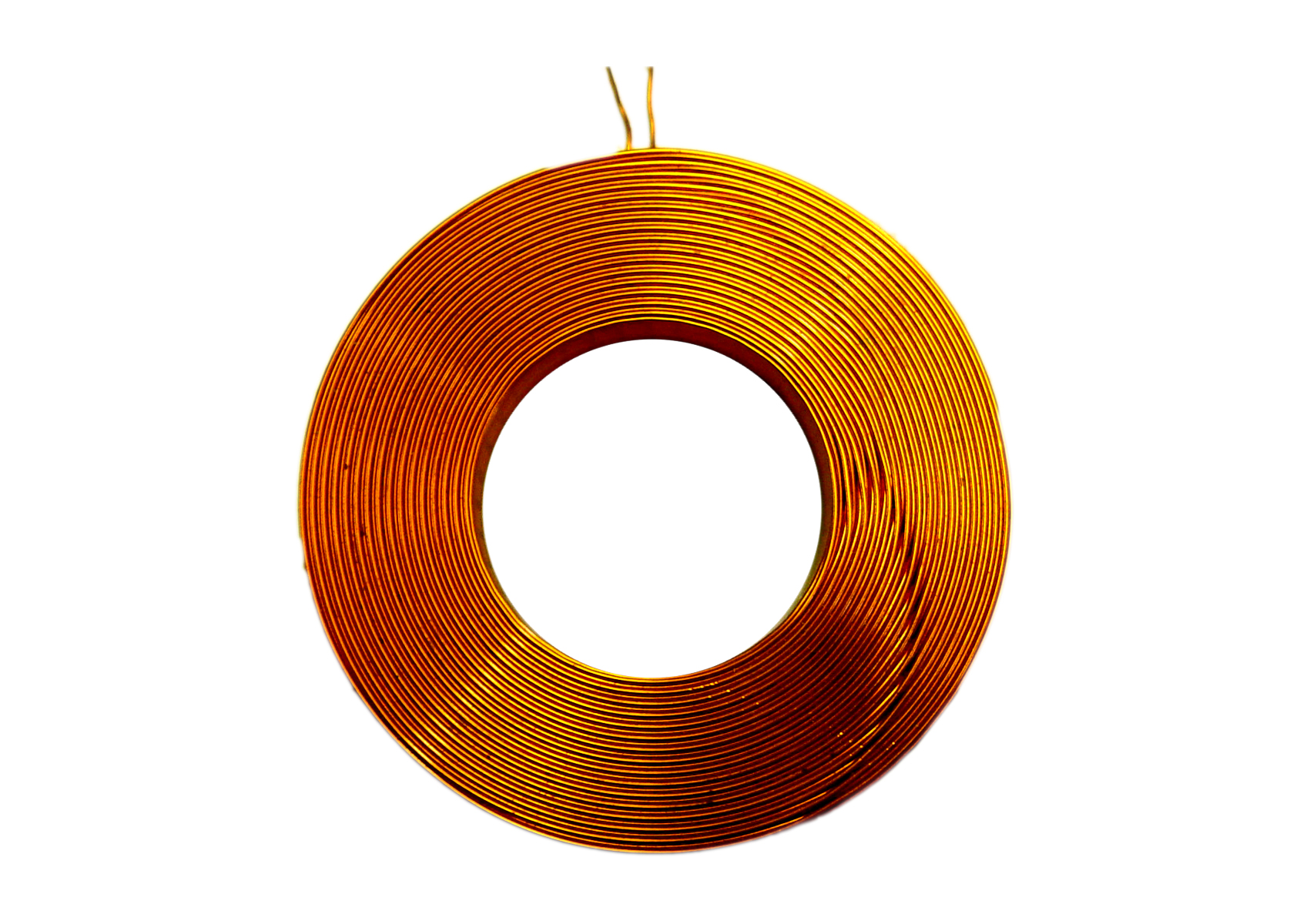
Orthocyclic wound coil

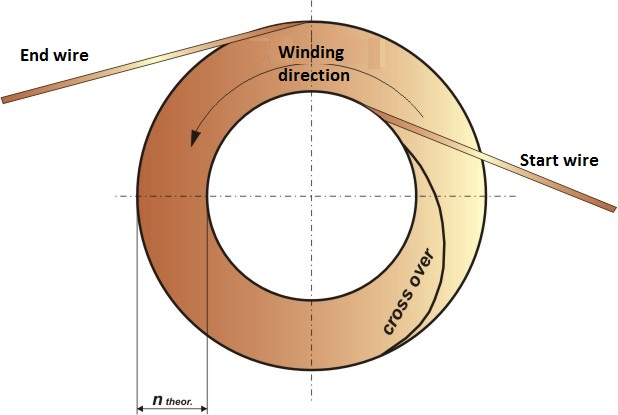
Orthocyclic winding of a round coil

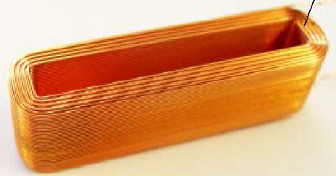
Orthocyclic winding of a rectangular motor coil

This type of winding structure creates an optimal fill factor (90.7%) for round wires. The windings of the upper layer need to be placed into the grooves provided by the lower layer.

The best volume use is found when the winding is parallel to the coil flange for most of its circumference. When the winding has been placed around the coil body it will meet with the previous positioned wire and needs to make a step with the size of the wire gauge. This movement is called winding step. The winding step can occupy an area of up to 60 degree of the coil circumference for round coil bobbins and takes one side of rectangular coil bobbins. The area of the winding step is dependent on the wire gauge and coil bobbin geometry.

If the winding step cannot be executed properly then the self-guiding ability of the wire is lost and a wild winding is produced. Overall, the first intruding wire mainly determines the location and quality of the winding step. It should be recognized that the wire needs to enter in a possibly flat angle into the winding space. That way an unnecessary bending of the wire is being avoided and the needs space for the second winding step is minimised. For orthocyclic wound coils, the winding step areas is always located at the area of wire entering the winding space and is being continued in helical form against the winding direction. As a consequence a bigger winding width of the coil, leads to a bigger winding step area along the circumference of the coil. The created offset leads to a different position of the layer step, from the first to the second layer, in comparison to the wire entry. This behavior repeats itself with every layer which leads to a spiral shaped crossover section at the side of the winding. As wires are crossing within the crossover section the resulting winding height is increased. As a result, orthocyclic wound coils with a round coil ground are never circular in the cross over section, but the radial moving winding and layer step creates a hump shape. Experience has shown that, depending on the winding width, coil and wire diameter, the crossover section is about 5 to 10 percent higher than the regular winding height.

==== Location and size of the crossover section ====
Because the winding should be mostly positioned parallel to the winding flange, meeting an orthogonality condition, it is necessary to adjust the winding width to the number of turns per layer of the winding. In particular for non-circular shaped coil cross-sectional areas, it is desired to locate the crossover area to the small side of the coil body, also called winding head. This is due to the fact, that non-circular coils are being mounted on a sheet metal package or in a circular arrangement. The coils should be rather small, in order to avoid a contact with the neighboring coil or the sheet metal package. For orthocyclic round coils three winding geometries can be defined:

a) Equal number of turns per layer

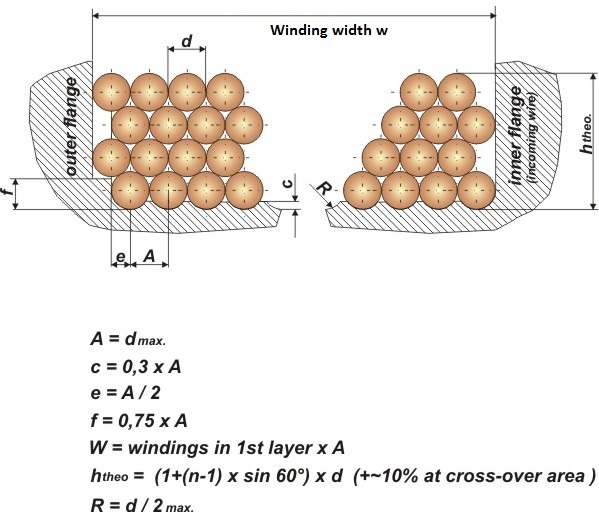

b) Unequal number of turns per layer, starting with shortened layer

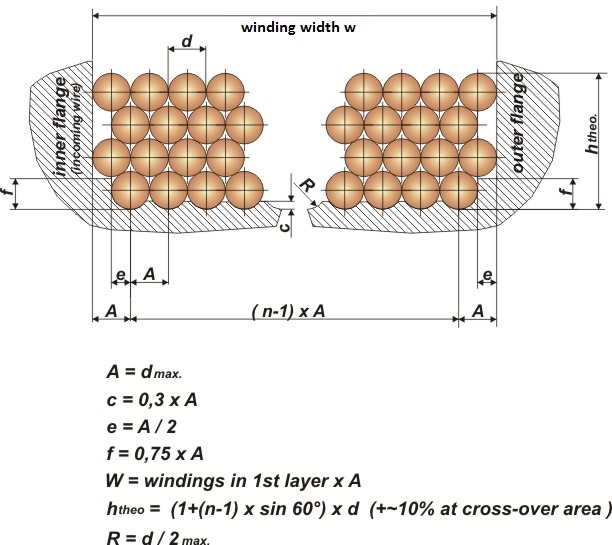

c) Unequal number of turns per layer, starting with longer layer

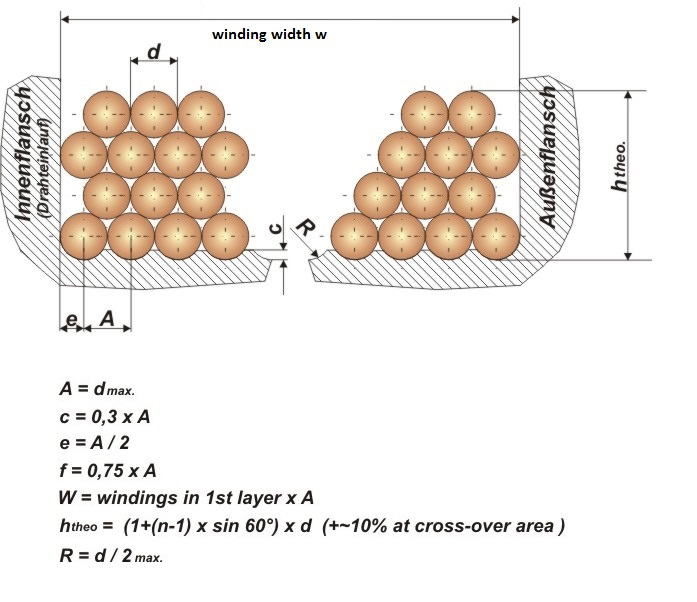

The choice of the winding structure to be used basically depends on the design of the coil or the coil body. Among others, the available space conditions for winding width and winding height must be considered. Moreover, it is possible to influence the location and the end of the last winding by selecting a clever winding pattern. The winding height of an orthocyclic coil winding results from the following equation:

$$h = [1+(n-1)\cdot \sin 60^\circ]\cdot d$$

$h$ -Winding height
$n$ - Number of layers
$d$ - max. wire gauge above the varnish (CuL)

Since an orthocyclically wound coil with at least 300° of the circumference of winding layers has the tightest circle package of the wire cross-sections. This winding method reaches the highest fill factor and is the best way to fill the available winding cross-section with round wires. Square coils are seen as orthocyclically wound when the winding and layer jump occur only on one of the sides of the winding cross-section. In theory, a geometric fill factor of 0.91 will be reached. In practice, however, the value cannot be reached because there exists a winding jump and layer jump area and the wire insulation is not taken into account.

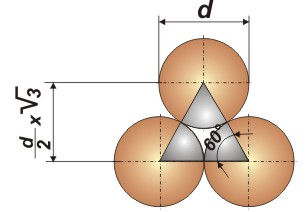
Orthocyclic winding

$$A\Delta = \frac {d^2}{4} \cdot \sqrt{3}$$

$$\Sigma A\Delta = \frac {d^2 \cdot \pi} {4} \cdot \frac {60}{360} \cdot 3 =\frac {d^2 \cdot \pi} {8}$$

fill factor = $\frac {\Sigma A\Delta}{A\Delta}$ = $\frac {\frac {d^2 \cdot \pi}{8}} {\frac {d^2}{4} \cdot \sqrt{3}}$ = $\frac {d^2 \cdot \pi}{8} \ \frac {1}{\frac {d^2}{4}\cdot \sqrt {3}}$

$= \frac {\pi}{2 \cdot \sqrt {3}}$ = 0,907

In general, it can be stated that the requirements that need to be fulfilled for orthocyclic windings are very high. The summation of all tolerances has to be kept at a very low value. Consequently, the following values can be named as indicatory values: a) Tolerance of the winding space width

$$\Delta b= 0,2 \cdot d$$

$\Delta b$ - tolerance of winding space
$d$ - max. wire gauge including the varnish coat (CuL)

b) Tolerance of the wire Max. wire diameter tolerance should not be larger than

$$\Delta d = 0,4 \cdot \frac {d}{n}$$

$\Delta d$ - gauge – wire tolerance
$n$ - number of turns per layer
$d$ - nominal wire gauge including the varnish coat (CuL)

This corresponds to about half the wire tolerance according to the specification of the German standard DIN46435.

==== Manufacturing orthocyclic windings ====
Even if the demands for low tolerances of the wire and the winding space had to be observed with correspondingly high technical effort, there would still remain the problem that the wire guiding on the machine side has to follow the previously described winding design also at high winding speeds. In practice, this is hardly possible at high winding speeds since, e.g., at 18.000 windings per minute, the wire guide for a wire with a thickness of 0.3 mm would need to perform a winding pitch in only 0.7 ms. The problem is amplified by the fact that in practice the ideal wire is never absolutely straight. These unevennesses and bends resulting from the winding of the wire on delivery rolls have the effect that the wires are never completely close together according to their actual diameter but at a distance according to their unevenness.

This gap formation is additionally influenced during the winding-up of the wire by the surface quality of its coating, e.g. the sliding behavior as well as by the expansion behavior or stiffness of the copper. The wire elongation may be between 6% and 3% depending on the wire diameter and the supplier. Practice has shown that an orthocyclic winding can only be manufactured in an acceptable way when choosing a very high wire elongation level (stretching leads to a straight or even wire) at the beginning. For the reasons described above, it is therefore in practice impossible for the wire guide to determine a precise gradient according to the wire diameter.

These unpredictable circumstances may be prevented or counteracted at the beginning of the winding by forcing the wire, meaning, every single winding of the first layer on the inner coil diameter, into a predefined position. The wire places itself into a prefabricated groove geometry of the coil body and the wire guide does not need to follow it exactly but only approximately. Since the wire always loses in cross-sectional area due to the wire drawing to be used and the necessary deflections (mechanical stresses under tensile load) during winding, the distance between the grooves is designed only for the max. possible wire diameter. Effects of bends and tolerances of the wire and the coil body as well as changing surface qualities can be avoided that way. Especially wire bends that develop due to wire deflections caused by, e.g., pulleys, wire eyelets or even the wire guiding nozzle itself within the wire feeder of a winding machine can lead to deformations that remain on the winding of a coil. Applying grooves to the winding basis supports the layer-accurate position of the wire during the winding process. This behavior is particularly beneficial for the winding processes where a plastic deformation of the wire is unavoidable immediately before the depositing of the wire onto the winding basis. This behavior can be observed especially in the needle winding technology. Owing to physical reasons, it is unavoidable that the wire leaves the wire guiding nozzle at an angle of approx. 90°. Therefore, mechanical tensions remain inside the wire that are visible in the form of a bent winding on the winding basis. As a result, the following windings, or also the following layers, can change in their desired position.

Starting from the second layer, the relocation is facilitated, since the wire is guided through the inter-spaces of the preceding layer. In case of deflections that are not too excessive as far as the process is concerned, the wire leads itself and with a constant number of windings per layer. It means for the wire guiding movement that the smaller the distance of the wire guiding nozzle towards the coil, the more precise the tracking must be. In certain circumstances it can be completely performed without a relocating movement, if the distance from the nozzle to the coil is that long that the force component against the guiding behavior of the wire itself has no longer an effect. Owing to the self-guiding behavior of the wire, it is therefore possible that also during orthocyclic winding the wire guide can run continually and does not need to follow gradually.

==== Design of an orthocyclic winding ====
The design or interpretation of the required space of an orthocyclic winding is usually realized by applying an iterative approach. At first, the specified parameters of the required number of windings, the required wire cross section and the maximum space available for an insulated coil are used for the calculation basis.

==== Calculation example ====
An orthocyclic winding design for a round coil with 150 windings, a wire diameter of 0.3 mm and a maximum winding width of 9 mm shall be calculated. The winding diameter at the winding base measures 8 mm.

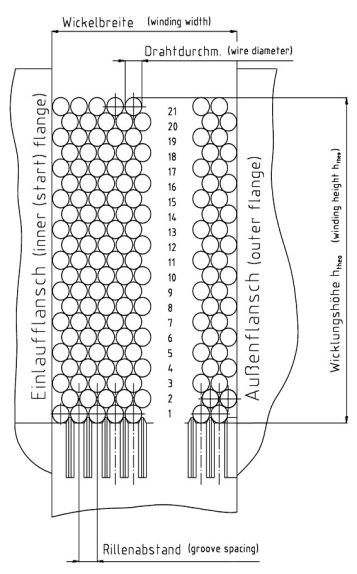
Structure of a coil with an even number of turns per

Given:

Wire-Ø Cu 0,3 mm → CU1L=0,334 mm (According to the table)

Coil width: should be 9 mm // 150 turns, coil inner diameter 8mm.

a) Calculation of the winding width In the first iteration step, a winding with the same number of windings per layer is assumed or taken as a basis.

9/0,334 → 26,9 turns/layer → chosen 26 turns per layer

$$Winding width = 26 \cdot 0.334 + 0.5 \cdot 0.334 = 8.85mm$$

b) Calculation of the number of layers

Number of layers = 150/26 = 5,76 → 6 layers

c) Calculation of the winding height

$$\text{Winding height h}= [1+(h-1) \cdot \sin 60^\circ] \cdot d$$
$$\text{ Winding height h}= [1+(6-1) \cdot \sin 60^\circ] \cdot 0.334=1.78mm$$

d) Calculation of the winding height in the layer cross section area

$$h_\text{Lagensprung} = 1.78 + 5\% = 1.86mm$$

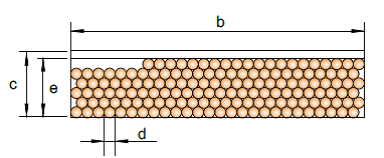
b=8,85 mm; e=1,78 mm; c=1,86 mm; d=0,334 mm; winding structure calculation example for an orthocyclic area. 150 turns in 6 layers with 26 turns per layer and an equal number of turns per layer

e) Calculation of the outer diameter of the coil

$$\text{Outer diameter }: D=2 \cdot h + inner diameter of winding$$
$$D = 1.78\cdot 2 + 8 = 11.56mm$$

f) Calculation of the outer dimensions of the coil in the cross section area

$$\text{ Outer diameter }: D_\text{max}=2 \cdot h_\text{layer step} + inner diameter of winding</$$
$$D_\text{max}=1.86 \cdot 2+8=11.72mm$$

Summary of results: The calculation showed that the space needed for the purely orthocyclic winding with enameled wire fills a rectangular area that measures 1.86 mm x 8.85 mm. Taking into account the assumption that it is a round coil with an inner diameter of 8 mm, then, the outer diameter is 11.72 mm. The winding space constraints (flanges of a coil body) of a winding support must have a diameter of at least D_{min}=11,72mm considering the layer jump area.

===== Calculation of the fill factor =====
The fill factor measures the ratio between the volume of a winding package and the volume needed to house the winding pack. For this purpose, it is necessary to take the required space for the rotation diameter of the coil in the "cross over section" into consideration.

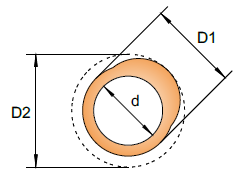
Scheme for the needed volume of a winding; D1=1,78mm D=8mm D2=1,86mm

a) Calculation of the mechanical fill factor

The imaginary space with the dimensions of 8,85 mm x 1,86 mm contains an area of 16.461 mm^{2}. The sum of all partial spaces of the insulated turns equals

$$A=\frac{\pi \cdot D^2}{4} \cdot n$$

A = Amount of partial spaces of the insulated wires D_{L}= wire gauge above the varnish n= number of turns

$$A=\frac{\pi \cdot 0.334^2}{4} \cdot 150 = 13.14mm^2$$
$$F_\text{mech}= A_\text{wire}/A_\text{Winding space} \cdot 100\%$$
$$F_\text{mech}= 13.14mm^2 / 16.461 mm^2 \cdot 100\%$$
$$F_\text{mech}= 79.8\%$$

b) Calculation of the electrical fill factor

The imaginary space with the dimensions of 8,85 mm x 1,86 mm contains an area of 16.461 mm^{2}. The sum of all partial spaces of the not insulated turns equals

$$A=\frac{\pi \cdot D^2}{4} \cdot n$$

A= Amount of partial spaces of the not insulated wires

D_{Cu}= pure copper wire gauge

n= number of turns

$$A=\frac{\pi \cdot 0.3^2}{4} \cdot 150 = 10.59mm^2$$
$$F_\text{electr}= A_\text{ wire }/A_\text{ Winding space } \cdot 100\%$$
$$F_\text{electr}= 10.59mm^2 / 16.461 mm^2 \cdot 100\%$$
$$F_\text{electr}= 64.3\%$$

== Winding processes ==
=== Linear winding ===
In the linear winding method, a winding is produced by winding the wire onto a rotating coil body, component or coil carrying or coil forming device. The wire is pulled from a supply roll that contains 400 kg of enamelled copper wire. The wire is fed through a guiding tube. Before starting the actual winding process, the wire is mounted to a post or a clamping device of the coil body or winding device.

By the linear laying movement of the wire guiding tube, the component to be wound is turned in a way that the wire is distributed throughout the winding space of the coil body. The rotary motion as well as the laying movement is achieved by using computer controlled motors. In relation to one rotation of the rotation axis and depending on the wire diameter, the traversing axis of the wire guiding tube is moved accordingly (traverse pitch).

In doing so, rotational speeds of up to 30,000 turns/minute can be reached, especially when processing thin wires. Depending on the winding diameter, wire speeds of up to 30 m/s are achieved during the winding process. The components to be wound are mounted on winding devices. The winding devices are coupled with driven spindles that generate the turning motion. Since bringing the wire into the winding area should be done as evenly as possible, the rotational axis and the traversing axis operate synchronously during the winding process.

In order to be able to control the positions of the wire guiding nozzle in relation to the component to be wound, even with different component geometries, normally three CNC axes are used for the method with a wire guiding nozzle.

This enables the terminating to coil body posts (the posts are also intended to make contacts by soldering or welding): By letting the three axes run in a way that a spiral movement of the wire guiding nozzle around the initial winding post results, it is possible to fix the start or end wire of a coil by the termination. To keep the wire taut when changing the product, it is fixed to a wire parking pin of the machine.

This wire parking pin can either be a clamp or a copy of a post that is wrapped at the coil similar to the termination process. Before the winding starts and after terminating the start wire post, the wire to the parking pin needs to be cut. This takes place according to the wire thickness by tearing or cutting.

Enamelled copper wires up to a diameter of approx. 0.3 mm can be torn normally by a tearing pen that passes close to the post of the coil or the wire guiding nozzle itself. The separating point should be very close to the post of the coil in order not to impede a subsequent contacting process (soldering, welding etc.).

Since all the movements during winding are directed via CNC axes, it is possible to achieve wild windings, orthocyclic windings or other winding geometries (e.g. cross-coils). The wire guiding control can often be switched between continuous and gradual movement.

Owing to the separation between wire guiding and rotation of the component to be wound, the configuration of product and wire guiding can be duplicated in the linear winding technology. Therefore, it is possible, e.g., to wind onto 20 spindles simultaneously. This makes the linear winding method a very efficient process since the cycle time for producing a component results from the quotient of the winding process cycle time and the number of used spindles. The linear winding technology is often applied efficiently where low-mass coil bodies have to be wound.

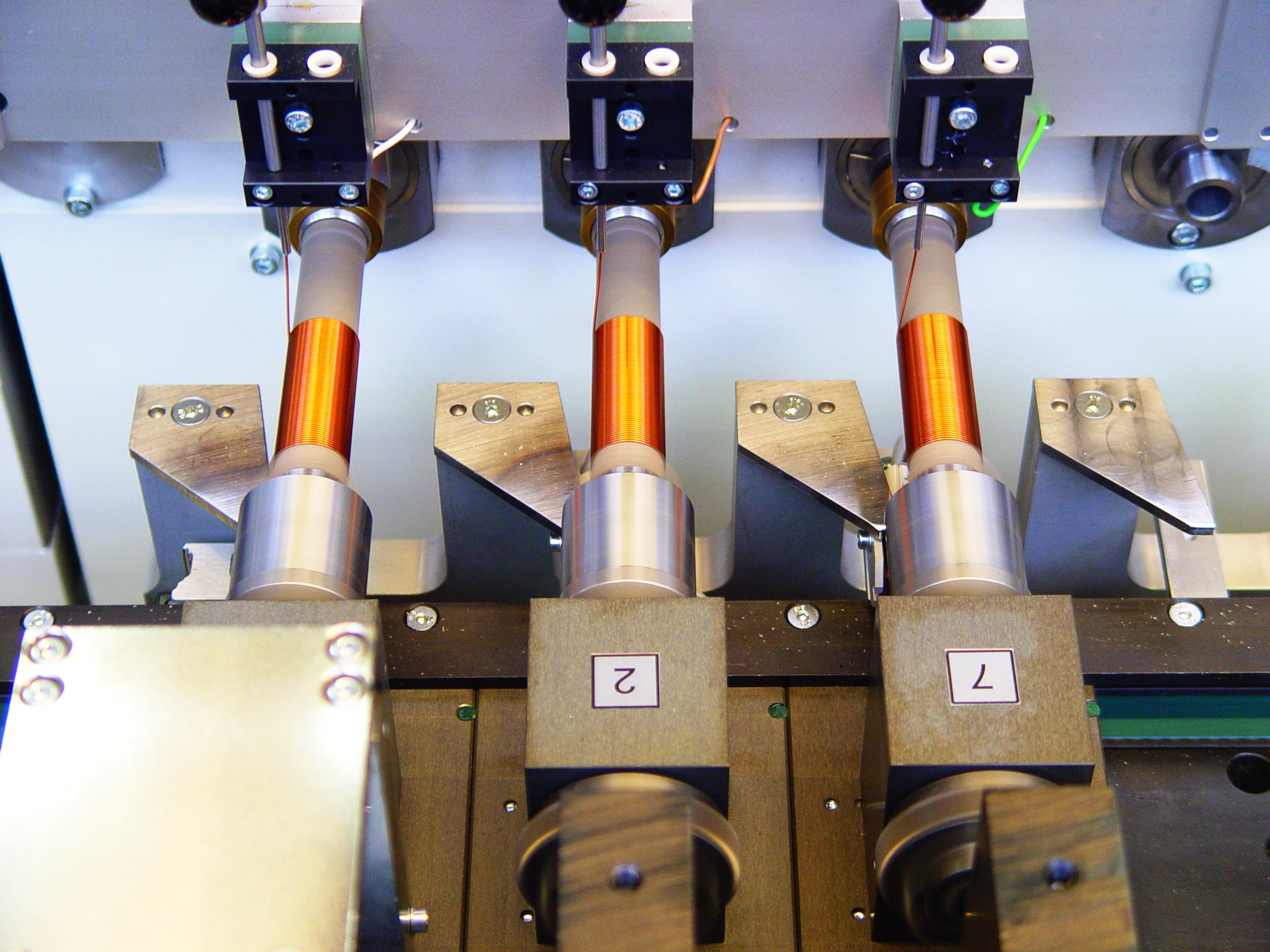
Linear Winding

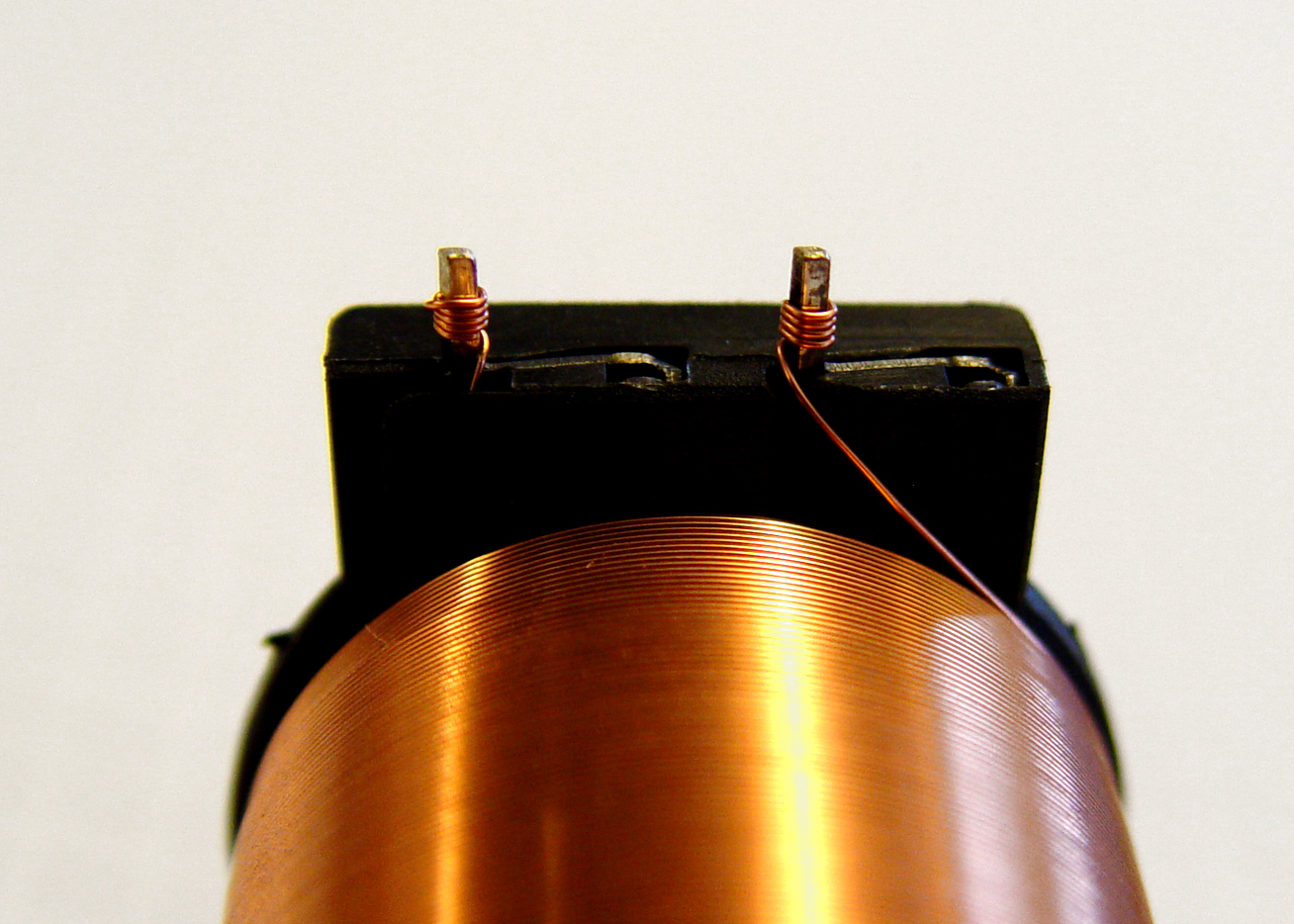
Termination pillar for a coil

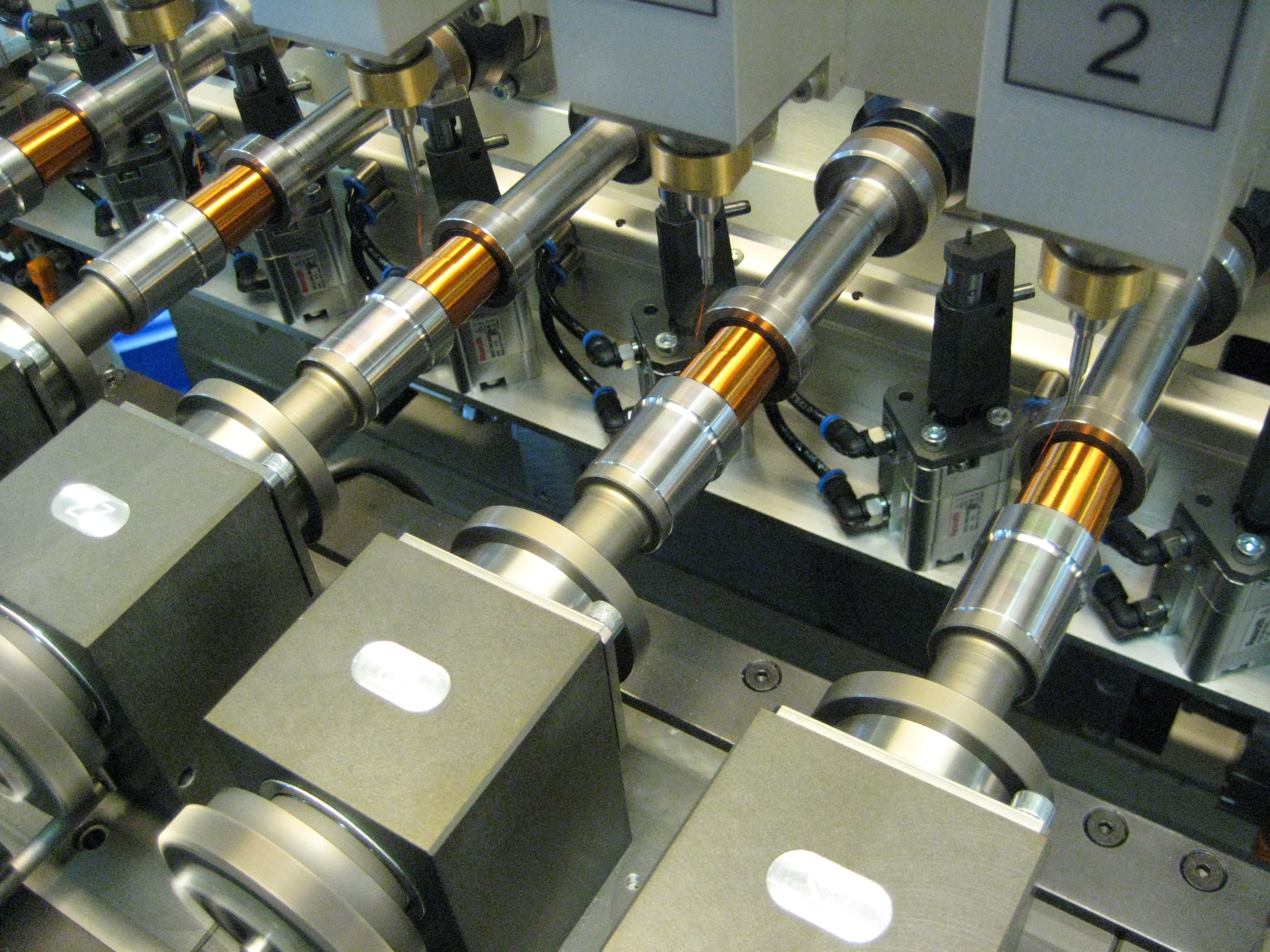
Wire parking pillar for a winding machine

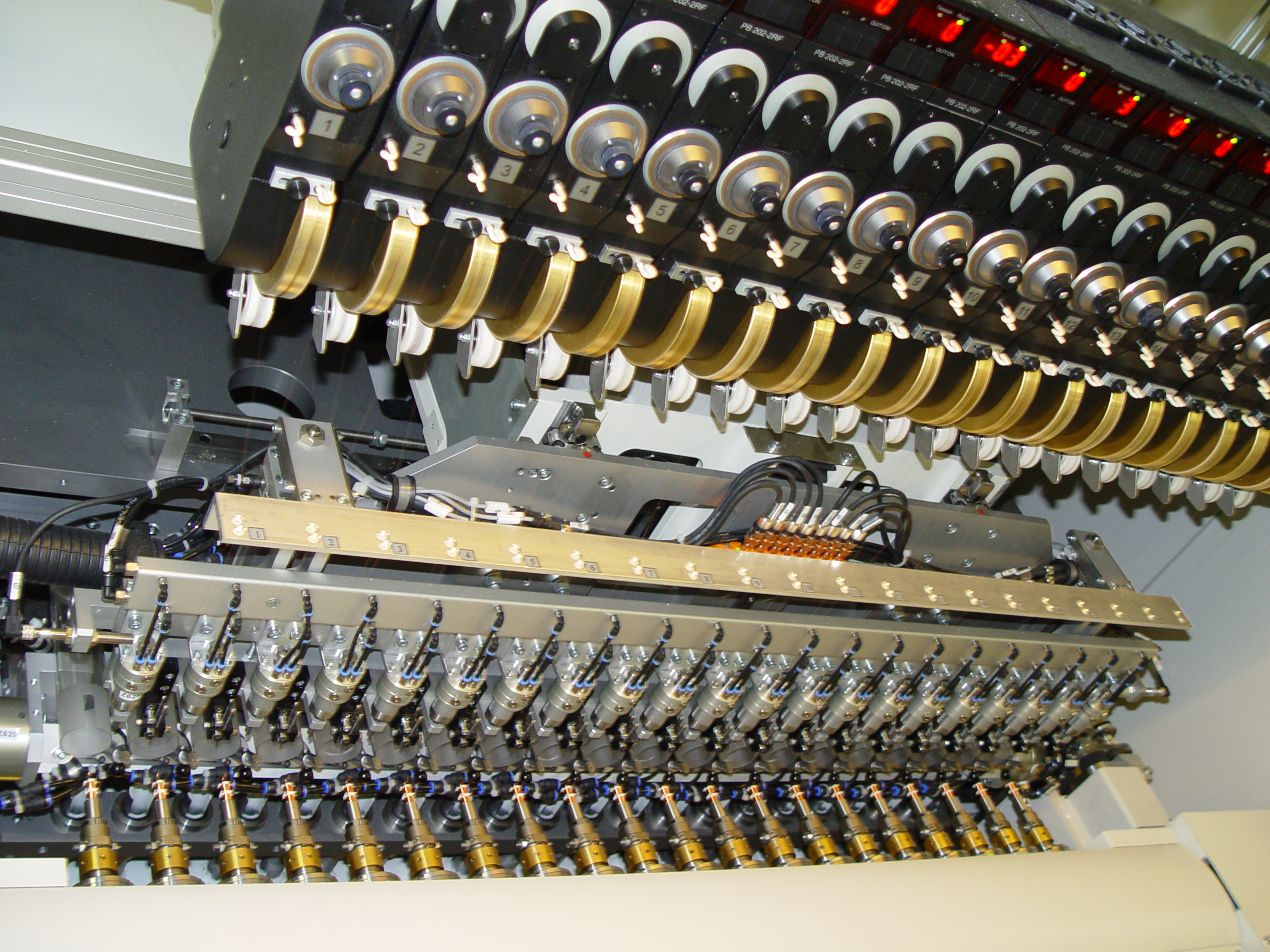
Linear winding machine from the company Fa. Aumann GmbH

=== Flyer winding ===
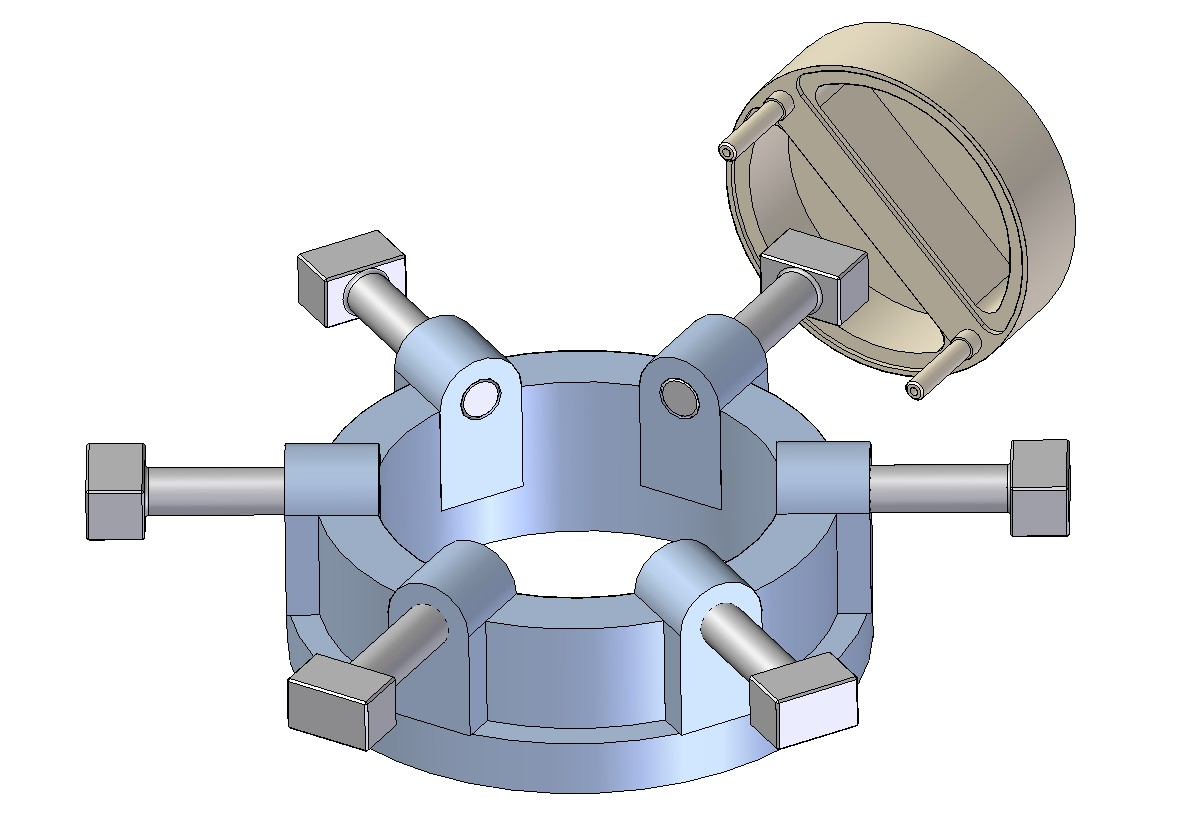
"Flyer"-winding with a sequential winding process

In the flyer winding method, a winding is produced by feeding the wire via a roll or through a nozzle that is attached to a flyer that is rotating at a certain distance from the coil. The wire is fed by the flyer shaft. For winding the component to be wound, it needs to be fixed inside the winding area of the flyer. It is necessary that the wire is fixed outside of the flyer at any time of the winding procedure. The fixation of the wire is made possible normally by the successive winding method (often used at rotary indexing tables): At the circumference of the table are wire clips or wire deflections that enable a pulling along and with it a fixation of the wire. This will allow a very quick component change, given that no separate depositing of the wire in a wire clip on the machine is required.

Because the last guided point of the wire is located at a nozzle or roll of a flyer arm which is moving on a fixed circular path that can only be shifted in laying direction, a precise laying close to the coil surface is impossible. As a result, it is not easily possible to clearly lay down or even to terminate the start and end wires onto the component to be wound. But it is certainly possible to produce also orthocyclic coils with the flyer winding process. Here, a self-guiding behavior of the wire on the coil surface is an advantage.

As the component to be wound has to be presented only in the winding position and otherwise does not need to perform any movement during the winding process, also very bulky and massive products can be manufactured. One example is the rotors of electric motors (rotor winding technology, special form of the successive winding method): The wire is held by a clip fixed to the machine during the component change. Since the rotors often consist of heavy, punch-packed metal sheets, the flyer winding technology is of particular advantage in this regard. Since the flyer cannot be directly guided in case of the rotor winding technology, the wire is guided across polished guiding blocks into the corresponding groove or slot. Special wiring sleeves ensure the correct wire position at the terminals of the Commutators.

=== Needle winding ===
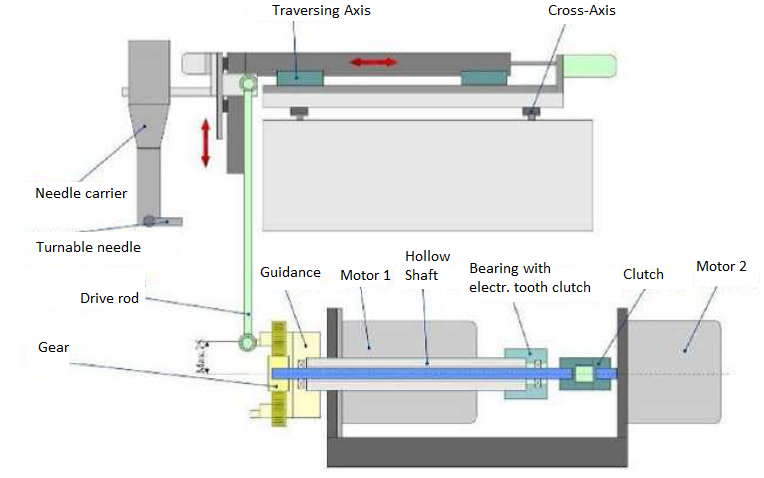
Winding machine

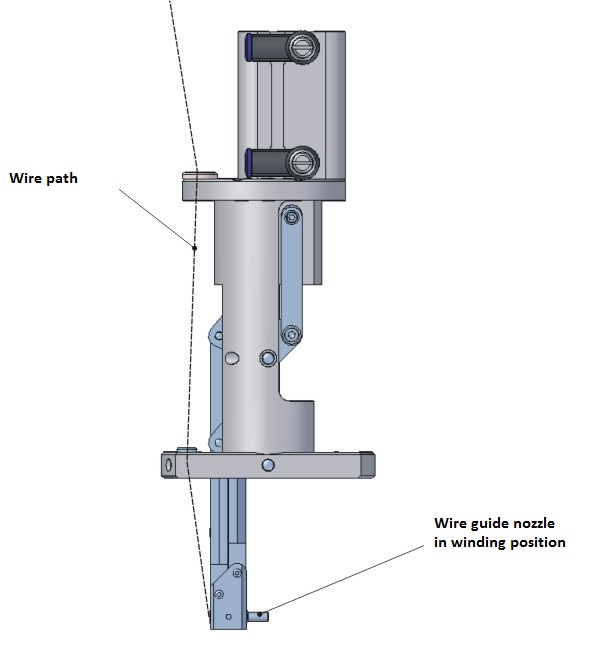
Winding nozzle in winding position

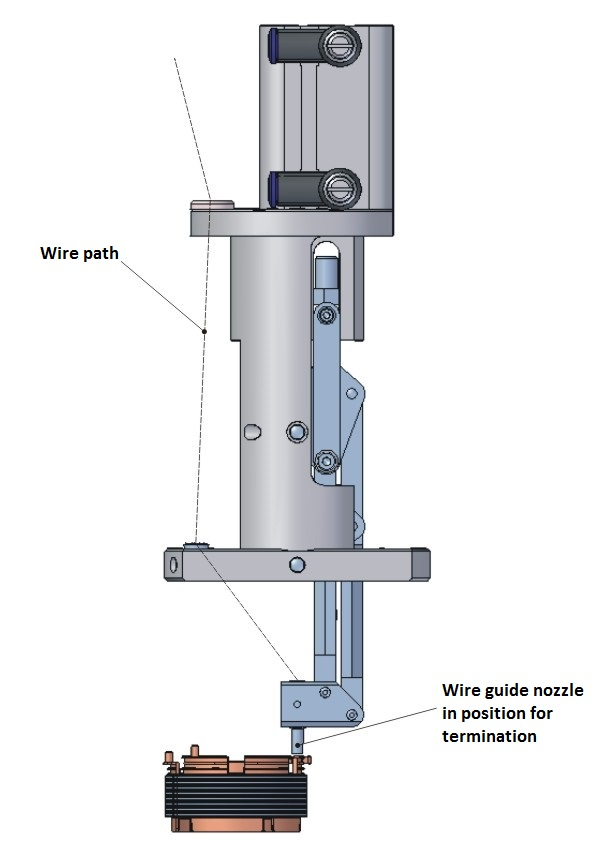
Winding nozzle in position for termination

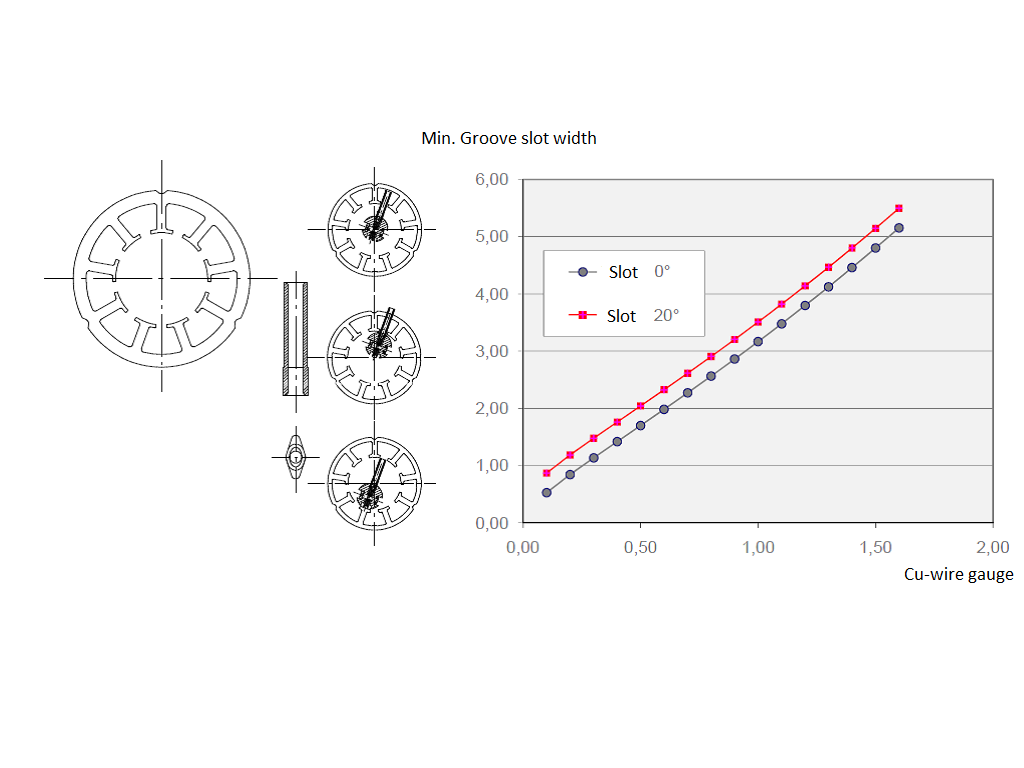
Determination of the necessary space between teeth depending on the wire gauge (Source: Aumann GmbH)

To efficiently wind narrow slots of electronically commutated multipole three-phase motors, the teeth are coated with insulation and directly wound with the needle winding method. A needle with a nozzle that is placed at a right angle to the direction of movement travels in a lifting motion passing the stator packs through the slot channel between the two neighboring teeth of the motor to drop the wire in the desired place. The stator is then turned at the reversal point on the winding head by one tooth pitch so that the previous process can run again in reverse order. With this winding technology a specific layer structure can be realized.

A disadvantage is that there must be a clearance between two adjacent teeth with a size of at least the nozzle diameter. The nozzle diameter is about three times the diameter of the winding wire. The space between two adjacent teeth can therefore not be filled completely.

An advantage is that the needle support carrying the wire guiding nozzle is normally coupled to a CNC coordinate system. This allows moving the nozzle through space towards the stator. This way, it is possible to also perform a laying movement apart from the normal lifting motion and the rotation of the stator. A targeted placing of the wire is nevertheless only possible to a limited extend since the wire is pulled at an angle of 90° from the wire guiding nozzle resulting in an undefined bulging.

The 90° redirection of the wire when exiting the hollow needle stresses the wire a lot and makes it difficult to wind copper wires with a diameter of more than 1 mm in a reasonable way. Orthocyclic winding with a needle winder is therefore only partly possible for these winding tasks.

Since the wire guiding nozzle can be moved freely throughout the room, it is possible for the nozzle to terminate the wire at the contact points if equipped with an additional swivel device. As in the case of the conventional linear winding technology, a contact pin or a hook contact can be terminated for the electrical connection and for interconnecting the single poles in a star connection or delta connection.

A precise synchronization of the rotary motion with the stroke movement is required so that the needle does not touch the slot channel during the up and down movement. Influencing variables for the maximum winding speed are the needle stroke, the rotation angle of the stator (number of poles), the wire diameter and the slot channel width and the helix angle of the angularly slotted stators. The mass of the wire guide and the needle support experience a high acceleration. This can lead to unwanted vibrations that have an effect on the winding quality. The lifting motion is normally generated by ball screws. During this movement, the servo drives must constantly reverse in order to reverse the direction of the needle movement.

Another way of initiating the stroke movement is to apply a crank disk that can also have a stroke adjustment and that uses the advantage of the sinusoidal movement pattern without needing a drive motor to reverse. Strokes (windings) up to 2500 per minute can be achieved.

With the needle winding technology, it is possible to produce a finished assembly such as stator coils or a connection and contacting onto a machine. Apart from the not fully utilized space between the poles, it is possible – in contrast to the conventional pull-in technique – to wind also motor coils with a good fill factor onto low stator sheet stack heights (coiler head heights).

=== Toroidal core winding technology ===
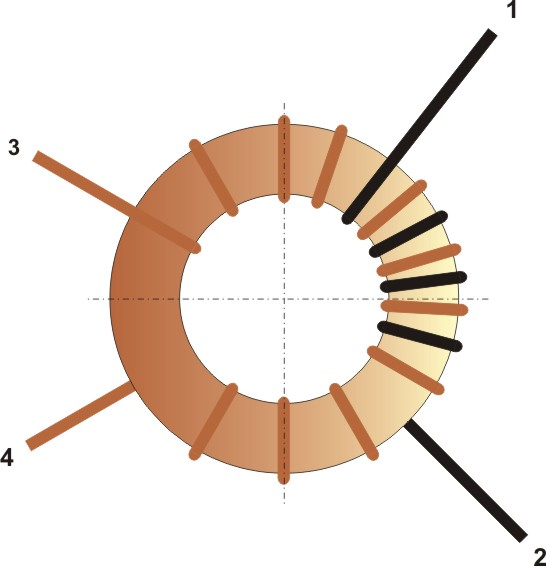
Toroidal coil

With the toroidal core winding technology an electric coil or winding is created by winding an electrical conductor (e.g. copper wire) through the circular ring and evenly distributing it over the circumference (Toroidal inductors and transformers, toroidal chokes).

Before the winding starts, the Toroidal / Magnetic core is mounted into a holding fixture that can initiate a slow rotary movement of the core with mostly three rubberized points of contact. A wire storage ring (orbital wheel) arranged 90° to the toroidal core will now be opened at the circumference and introduced into the center of the toroidal core. The wire is then coiled around the wire storage ring that was closed again. When the required amount is present on the wire accumulator, the end of the wire from the wire accumulator is fixed to the toroidal core that needs to be wound. By simultaneous rotation of the toroidal core and the wire accumulator ring, a winding develops that is distributed along the circumference of the toroidal core. Upon completion, the wire accumulator has to be opened again in order to be able to remove the ready wound toroidal core. Since the start and end wire are often not fixable to the toroidal core, toroidal winding machines can only be partly automated.

Toroidal cores are used despite the high manufacturing costs (a great deal of manual work) due to the low magnetic flux leakage (MFL – Leakage inductance), low core losses and the good power density. One possible quality feature of transformers is a uniform distribution of the windings along the circumference (low stray field). The insulation between the various windings can be solved quite differently. In case of covering windings, a film is applied after the first winding to achieve good stray field characteristics. This film needs to be wound to cover the whole circumference. For this, also toroidal winding machines with special magazines can be used.

== Winding technology for motor coils ==
=== Trends in motor winding technology ===
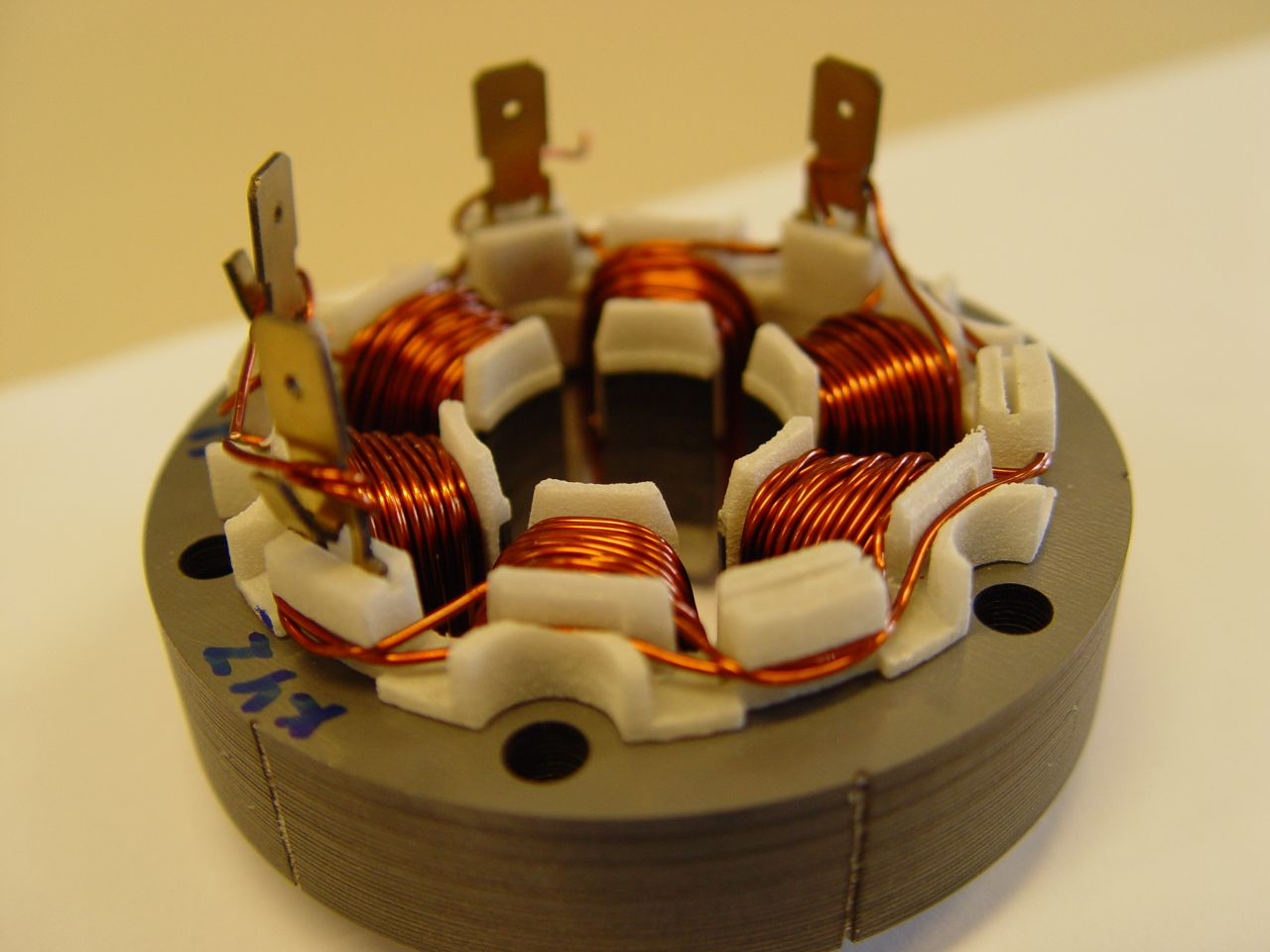
Inner-slotted stator with six poles

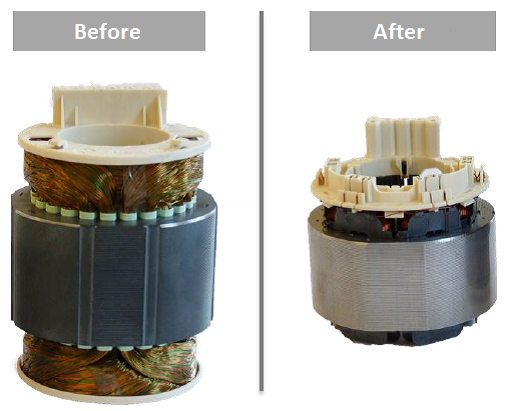
Stators with different winding topologies

Because of the higher performance density, brushless EC drives (electronically commutated motors) with permanent magnet rotors are increasingly used instead of the asynchronous technology. Owing to the compact design, the copper content can be cut in half in the best-case scenario. The manufacturers of electric motors also demand more flexibility of the production technology. For producing asynchronous motors, drawing-in systems are usually used that are initially winding air-core coils only to draw them later into the stator with a tool. In contrast, the concentrated winding of EC stators is more flexible in the manufacturing process, energy saving when implemented, better adjustable during operation and it requires less space.

=== Hairpin winding ===
A hairpin winding replaces many thin flexible round conductors with single thick flat rigid rectangular conductors to improve fill-rate. The thick conductors have sharp bends, resembling hairpin turn. Each hairpin occupies only two slots. The hairpins are welded together to form a continuous circuit through many slots. Hairpin winding has been widely used in electric motors in the automotive sector. This winding method offers the advantage of automated winding process.

Because of skin effect the large size of the conductors are prone to proximity losses resulting in high winding AC loss but because of the lower DC resistance, the copper losses are lower. The result when compared to random winding is higher efficiency at high load and low speed and lower efficiency at low load and high speed. Similar method, plug-in winding, has been proposed where the coils are pre-made with plug-in features (male-female). Compared to hairpin, the plug-in method offers the advantages of automated winding process and small conductors size, however, the disadvantage of high contact resistivity in the plug-in connectors could result in a thermal hot spots.

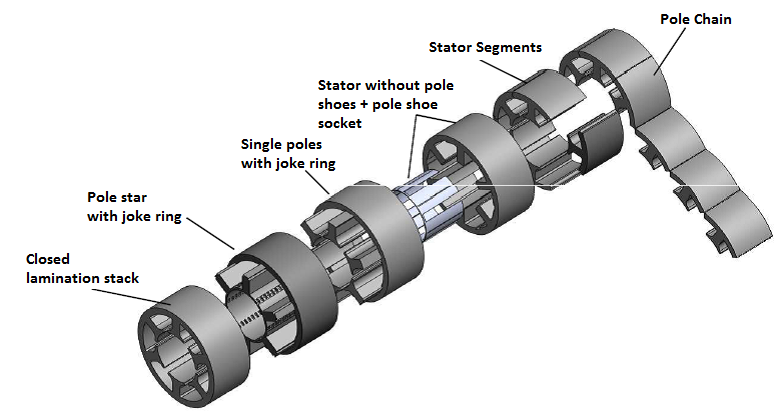
Examples for different Designs of EC-Stators (Source: Technoexpert Dresden)

=== Manufacturing process of distributed winding ===
Asynchronous motors with distributed winding account for the major share of electric motors. Unlike the concentrated winding, not every tooth pole is wound in a distributed winding; instead, coils are in slots and span multiple pole teeth. Since the winding may block slots from further insertion of wire, it may be necessary to wind a complete phase winding at one time.

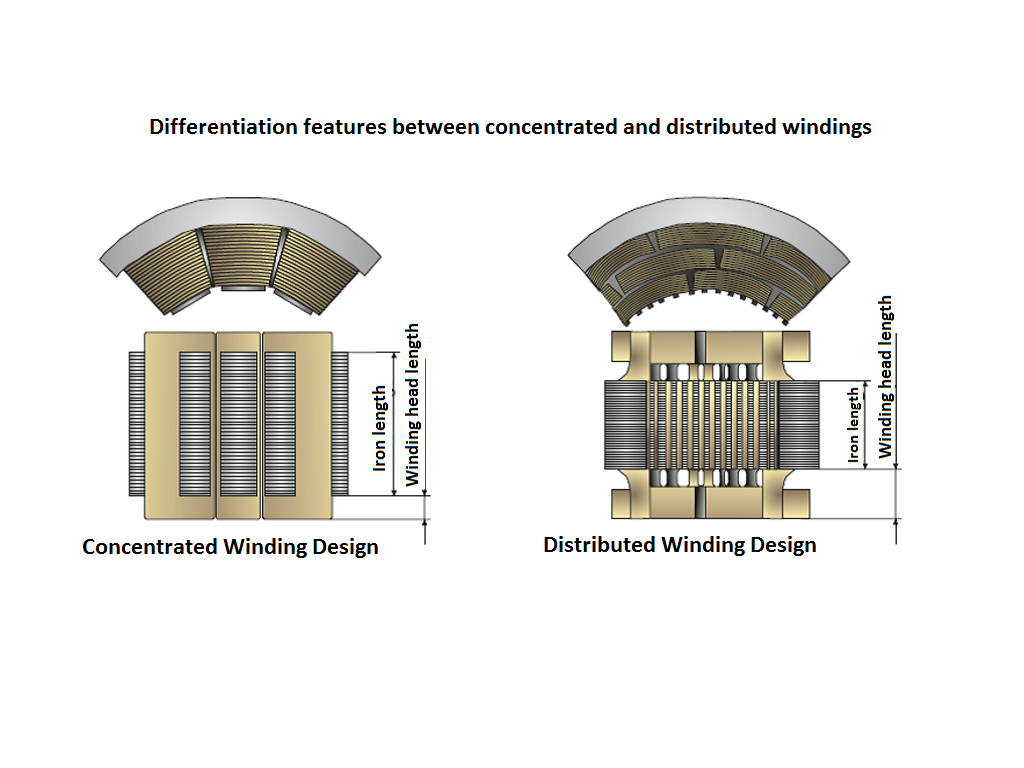
Comparison of concentrated and distributed windings

Coil insertion machines insert prefabricated groups of coils into the stators of electric motors. The coil groups are frequently manufactured with flyer winding machines and put onto the insertion tool with a transfer instrument. In small-batch manufacturing, the coil groups are relocated manually from the winding masks to the insertion tool using transfer instruments. Subsequently, an insertion tool places the preformed winding into the stator slots. The slots are sometimes insulated with paper. When diagonally winding the coil into the slot of the stator, the coil's internal width must be larger than the stator's height which leads to the formation of the large winding head that is characteristic for the insertion technique.

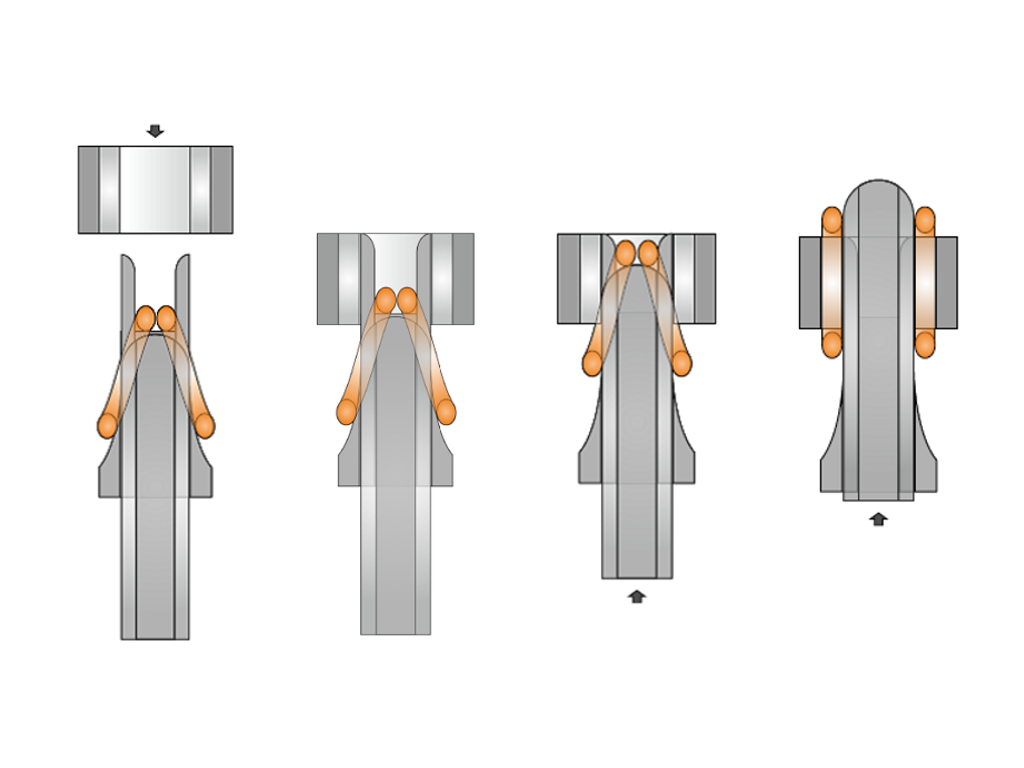
Process steps for insert technique: 1) Non equipped insert tool; 2) Insert tool fitted with coils; 3) Insert tool with coils and mounted stator; 4) Stator with inserted coils

This in turn results in a relatively loose winding in the stator slots. Consequently, it is necessary to close the slot openings towards the middle of the stator with a sliding cover. In many cases, this may be conducted concurrently with the insertion of the coils. Since the coil's conductors have to pass through an oftentimes tight slot, the coils consist of a certain number of small spare cross-sections which are later connected in parallel. It is with this measure, that large conductor cross-sections may also be produced.

Another reason for using many thin conductors connected in parallel lies in avoiding the Skin effect. In order to keep the impact of this effect as small as possible, wires with the largest possible surface are used in high-frequency technology, e.g. in the form of thin spare cross-sections or Litz wires. The low losses of Litz wires partly stem from the fact that a large area of the inner surface is taking part in the current flow. In particular in electric mobility, the motor is often powered by high-frequency voltage. When using large conductor cross-sections, this may possibly lead to high losses and an undesired heat development in the stator winding.

After inserting the winding, rework on the stator or the winding ends needs to be performed. Usually, the multitude of connecting lines is separated manually and bundled according to the different phases. Both winding ends are tied up with an adhesive tape or strap in the further course of the finishing. When using a high operating voltage, the partial winding of each phase must be insulated against the respective adjacent phase with foil or insulation paper. To ensure that the winding heads are positioned exclusively at the back of the stator, both of them must be moulded. This is either executed by using an enameled wire receiving a bonding electric current during moulding or by cold forming which is followed by impregnation. The creation of a certain winding head shape allows a rotor to be installed or a stator to be inserted into the housing afterwards.

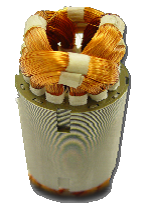
Wound winding head after the insertion process

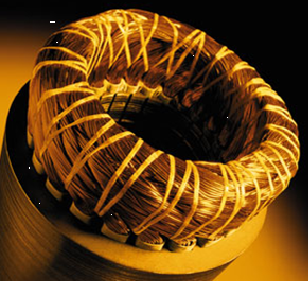
Wound and formed winding head of distributed winding

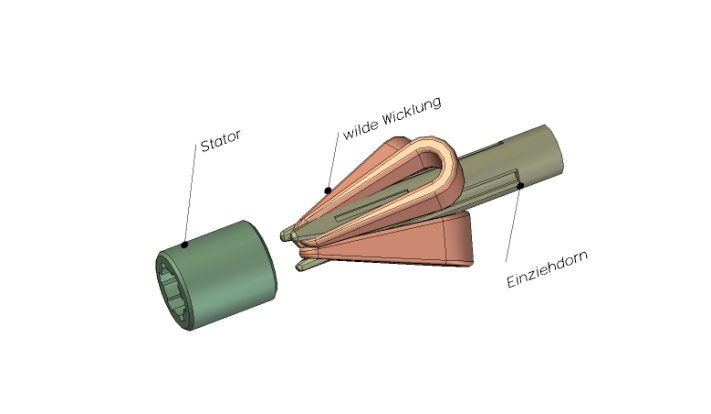
Schematics of the insert technique

==== Characterization of distributed winding ====
In case of stator windings that are electrically commutated or supplied by an m-phase net, these phase windings are often banked (distributed windings). The number of holes q constitutes a characteristic dimension of the winding setup. It states how many slots q per phase m and pole (provided by pole number 2p) are available.

$$q=\frac{N}{2p\cdot m}$$,

where:
$q$ = Number of holes
$N$ = Number of slots
$2p$ = Number of poles
$m$ = Number of phases

In the case of distributed windings, q ≥ 1, and if q is integer, it is an integral slot winding. If q = zq/nq is a fractional rational number, it is referred to as fractional slot winding. When it comes to single tooth winding, q < 1 and thus always a fractional rational number.

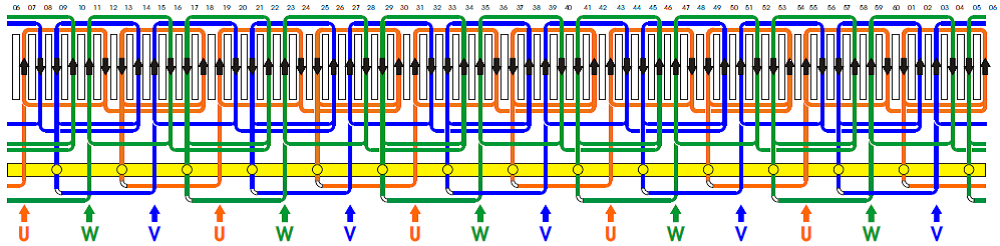
Example for a distributed winding topology

The winding scheme shows the execution of three-phase winding with 30 groups of coils at a winding pitch of 1:6 with the same width at a star connection. The combination of the star connections is depicted in form of a circle on the yellow contact bar. Each coil needs two slots. Consequently, 30 slots (coil groups) x 2 slots / group = 60 slots are required in order to achieve a consistent occupancy of the slots. The number of poles amounts to 10. The respective number of holes is:

$$q=\frac{60}{2 \cdot 5 \cdot 3} = 2$$

=== Manufacturing process of concentrated windings for stator coils ===
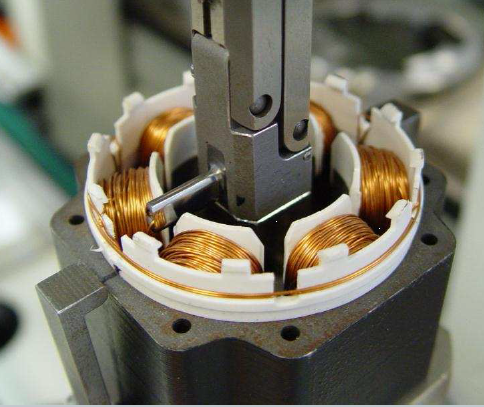
Needle winding displayed with end wires on the lead frame

Manufacturing stator windings in a concentrated manner can be performed in various ways. The choice of the respective winding process is primarily based on the design and setup of the stator as well as the commercial aspects. Most stators are designed in a way that allows the application of different winding processes. The stator construction of the full-metal cut which is internally slotted constitutes the only exception. This construction can solely be manufactured by applying the needle-winding technique and in some rare cases the insertion technique for concentrated windings. Most concentrated windings are executed as double-layer windings, i.e. each tooth entails a concentrated winding and two coil phases in each slot. In the case of single-layer winding, the reference tooth of two adjacent tooth coils is not wound. There is always only one phase of one coil found in the slots.

==== Inside slotted stator laminations ====
The needle-winding technique basically represents the only feasible winding process for inside slotted stator laminations. The stator mainly consists of a steel package, two end plates and slot insulation. The particular benefit of this process technology lies in the fact that the winding machine produces a completely wound assembly group when adequate electrical slot fill factors are employed. If, however, the use of single teeth requires joining and interconnecting operations, all interconnecting measures of the coil sections of one phase may be executed by the winding machine for the stator laminations. In this case, the electric slot fill factor may amount up to 45%. Since manufacturing a functioning stator merely requires a small effort, the negative impact on the electric fill factor is gladly accepted. In order to be able to use various additional functions of the winding machine, the end plates are often designed in a way which allows e.g. the taking on of cutting terminal contacts. In addition, winding space restrictions and laying ducts for the connecting wires of a phase may be integrated.

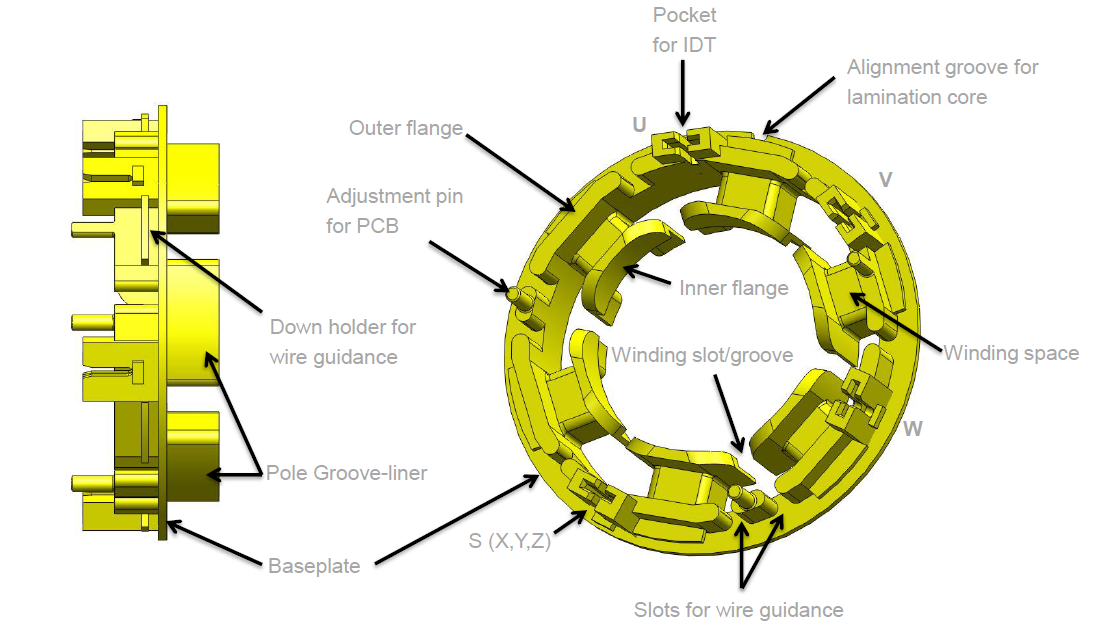
Example for a lead from for a full sheet metal package stator displaying several design characteristics

The material costs are also low due to the small number of individual components. In combination with the modest costs of the means of production, stator laminations constitute a practical solution. Three essential basic concepts frequently come to the fore when dealing with the design of stator laminations. Stator laminations for concentrated winding are divided into the following main groups.

===== Paper-insulated stator laminations =====
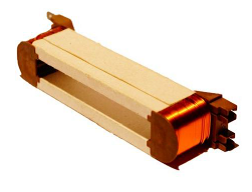
Paper-insulated stator

Insulation paper or insulation foil is usually attached to the slots of the stator package before the insulated end plates are installed. The insulation material, e.g. Nomex or Mylar or Kapton, is taken from the endless strip. It is pre-hemmed, cut to the length of the stator and inserted. The insulation strip must be slightly longer than the stator package to ensure complete insulation of the winding. Thin insulation takes up little of the slot area, which improves the fill factor of the winding.

===== Insulated stator laminations at end plates =====
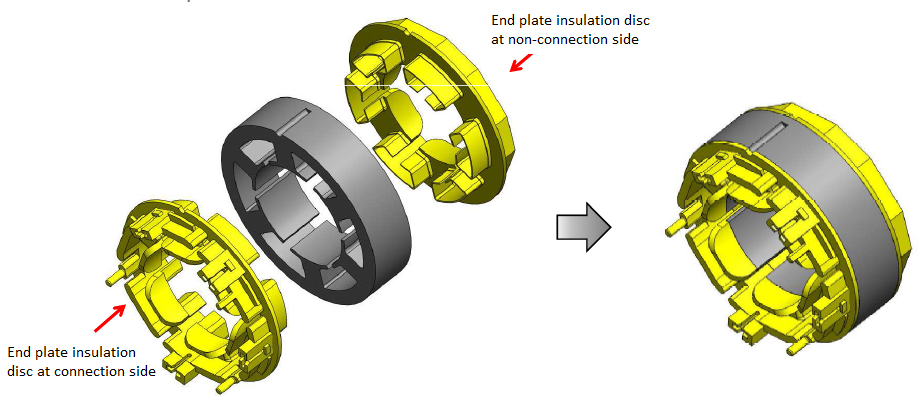
Concept of an end plated insulated stator

When using this type of stator design, lining the slot with insulation paper is not required. The plastic end plates are designed in a way that the sides of the injected shafts insulate half of the stator slot. It is also beneficial, that costs for paper as well as costs for the production process for the mounting of the paper do not arise. Under consideration of a certain wall thickness of these injected shafts, z-shaped overlapping of the shafts in the area of the stator nut center may be achieved in order to increase the creepage distance and clearance to avoid dielectric breakdowns. However, a disadvantage constitutes in the fact that the depth of the shot of the injection process is limited depending on the stator lengths and the plastic material used. When e.g. using PA with a solid material content (e.g. glass fibers) of approx. 25% and a shot of approx. 25 mm depth, a wall thickness of at least 0.5 mm may be achieved. However, it has negative repercussions on the fill factor compared to the use of insulation paper which e.g. is only 0.1 mm thick.

==== Molded stator laminations ====
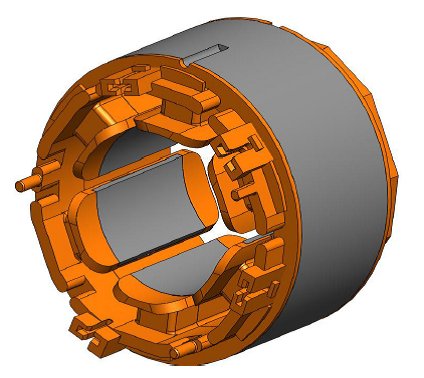
Concept for a coated stator

An extended form of the stator's end insulation with injected slot shafts constitutes in the moulded stator. In the last few years, injection moulding has progressively been developed. It now allows to place the stator package into the injection mould and to facilitate the moulding process. In doing so, the wall thickness reached is similar to that of the end plates with injected slot shafts. A particular benefit of this process lies in the fact that a pre-assembly of the end bells and the insulation paper can be avoided which prevents the danger of insulation gaps that could lead to short circuits. However, due to the very costly complex injection mould, costs are only covered at a batch size of approx. 50.000 stators per year, compared to single component insulation. In addition, the diversity in types is only conditionally lucrative since a new injection mould needs to be produced whenever the length of the package or the laminations changes.

==== Outside slotted stator laminations ====
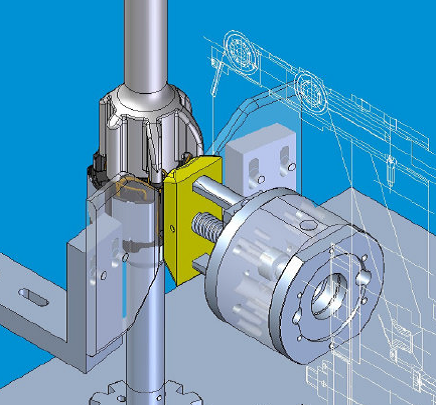
Schematics for flyer winding of an outer-grooved stator

Outside slotted stator laminations may be processed with the needle-winding technique, the flyer-winding technique and the linear-winding technique. The selection of the process depends on the desired number of turns in the winding and the intended fill factors. Consequently, flyer-winding is particularly used if a thin wire and thus high numbers of windings are expected in combination with a medium and high voltage application. Therefore, it is typically used with “white goods”, such as e.g. household applications, or in general domestic engineering with an operating voltage of 230 V. In the case of stators with less windings and a lower mass, it is common to process outside slotted stator laminations using the needle-winding technique or the linear winding technique.

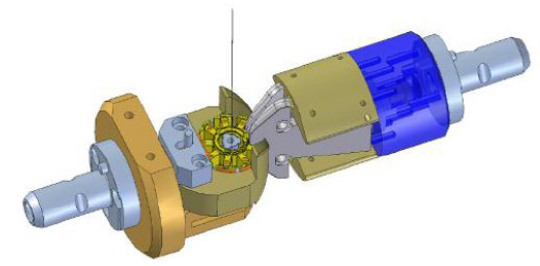
Linearwinding application used for an outer grooved stator

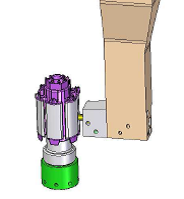
Needle winding application for an outer grooved stator

Basically, there is also a variety of different ways of insulation for outside slotted stator laminations as it is for inside slotted stator laminations:

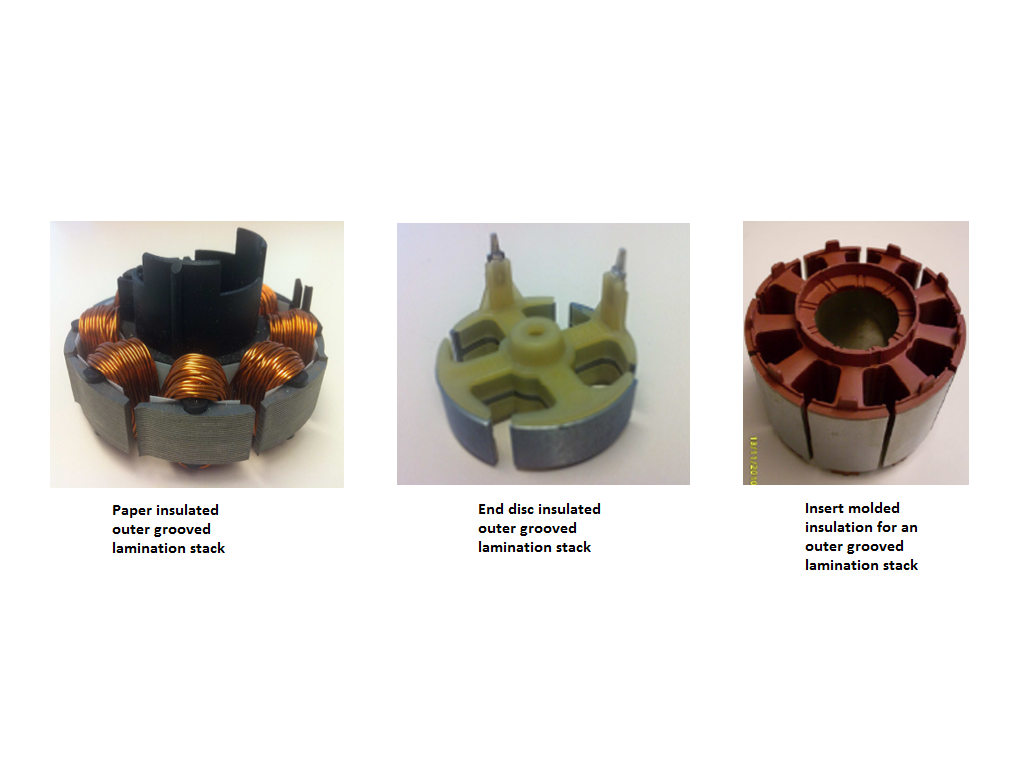
Verschieden isolierte Vollblechschnitte

==== Segmented stator coils ====
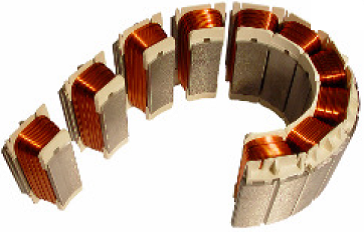
Polechain consisting of segments

Segmented stator coils are used, for example, if a high winding number is required in addition to the demanded high fill factor and the corresponding orthocyclic winding. They are preferably processed with the flyer-winding technique as well as with the linear-winding technique. For this type of stator construction, it is particularly beneficial to produce accurately layered windings with extremely high fill factors because of the freely accessible winding space. However, the design of the segmented stator coils has negative repercussions on the material and production costs. Often, complex processes need to be applied in order to form the single teeth to a round stator. Another disadvantage constitutes in the large number of contact points, except when the pole-chain winding technique is used.

For segmented stator coils, a distinction is made between T-segments and plugged engine coils. The latter may be bodiless or wound onto a coil body and subsequently be transferred to a T-segment or directly to the stator laminations, depending on the application. Contingent on the expected contact points, there are three different options for the production of T-segments. For one, there is the classic single T-segment with the disadvantage of having a high number of contact points. In addition, there is the phase wound T-segment with a reduced number of contact points. Finally, there is also the winding of pole chains with a drastically reduced number of contact points.

===== T-segments =====
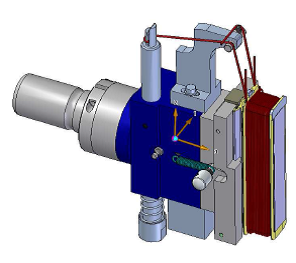
Winding tool for the fixation of a T-segment in a linear winding process

T-segments are preferably processed with the linear winding technique or the flyer-winding technique. For this, the winding supports are designed in a way that a mounting at the tooth back can be carried out. It is in particular the outer geometry that will serve as the contact surface of the adjacent tooth later on, which is used for securing the tooth in the winding device. It is also quite common to place a dovetail slot in the outer part of the back of the tooth which is axially arranged to the tooth and serves the purpose of securing the tooth in the winding device. Insulation of the winding of the T-segment may be performed the same way as for inside and outside stator laminations which is either by paper insulation, end bell insulation or as a moulded tooth.

===== Phase-wise wound T-segments =====
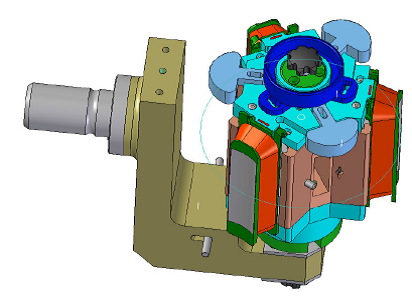
Winding tool for the fixation of a T-segment chain in a linear winding process

In combination with a series connection, T-segments are often produced as a phase compound in the form of a toothed chain. As is the case of single T-segments, the linear-winding technique as well as the flyer-winding technique are also applied in this context. When it comes to the winding of the teeth, the final wire of the first tooth is guided to the next tooth and then serves as the starting wire for the second tooth. This process continues, depending on the number of a phase's sub-segments. The design of the components does not show any substantial difference compared to the one of classic single teeth. The main reason for the processing of T-segments into one tooth chain lies in the reduced of number of contact points. Six contact points are required for three wound single tooth poles. However, only two contact points are needed if the just mentioned arrangement inside the winding machine is adopted. When using high current with low operating power, this type of manufacture is especially beneficial since it reduces contact resistances and potential errors. However, it is a very complex endeavor to form the tooth chains to a complete stator which is of disadvantage. It must be ensured, for example, that the end wires of each tooth are equipped with tension relief to ensure that the winding does not open during handling. Usually, it is taken care of with adhesive tape or pole or bag-type forming of the tooth's frontal insulation where the wire may be attached after the winding process. Single teeth are easy to handle, whereas tooth chains must be built in carefully, taking into account the risk of damaging the connecting wires.

===== Plugged tooth coils =====
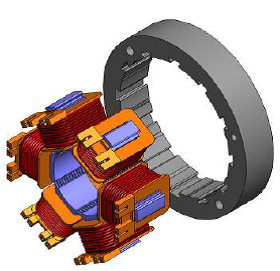
Stator design with plugged tooth coils

Plugged tooth coils are frequently used in a star-shaped stator design where a final ring or yoke is mounted after the assembly of the coils. Inside slotted stator laminations can also be fitted with plugged tooth coils. But in that case, fill factor losses can be registered due to the plug-in direction from the inside to the outside. Conical windings are only possible and beneficial, if the plug-in direction is from the outside to the inside. As for the type of insulation, it is possible – as with the classical single teeth – to work with paper insulations or insulating end plates. If insert moulding is applied with a star-shaped package, it is not referred to as plugged tooth coils anymore because of the necessary direct winding with a needle winding system, flyer winding technique or linear winding technique. Plugged tooth coils eventually require at least two contact points per coil, just as the single teeth. Toothed chains of a phase connected in series are rarely produced since, compared with the already difficult assembly of phase-wise wound T-segments, they will be followed by further assembly movements (pushing onto the stator pack) and the changing length ratios of the connecting wires between the coil sections of a phase. Therefore, two cut-and-clamp contacts per coil are frequently used for plugged tooth coils which finally reach into a control card or a lead frame via pin-like forms of the contacts.

===== Chains on poles (chained poles) =====
With this kind of stator design they try to combine the benefits of the needle-wound laminations. A minimum number of contact points – with the advantages of the linear wound single tooth creates a maximum fill factor.

For this, the chained poles winding technique is used that provides a very high fill factor due to the fact that the structure of the stator is opened up into a linear arrangement of the single teeth and besides, in contrast to the otherwise common single teeth, generates only a few contact points. The connecting wires of the coil sections of a phase connected in series do not need to be separated.

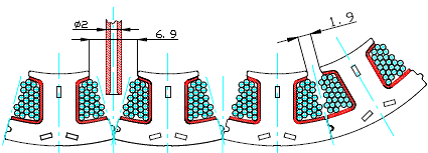
Schematics of an open winding space using a needle winding process for chained pools

When winding toothed chains, the flyer winding technique, also a type of needle winding and chain winding can be used.

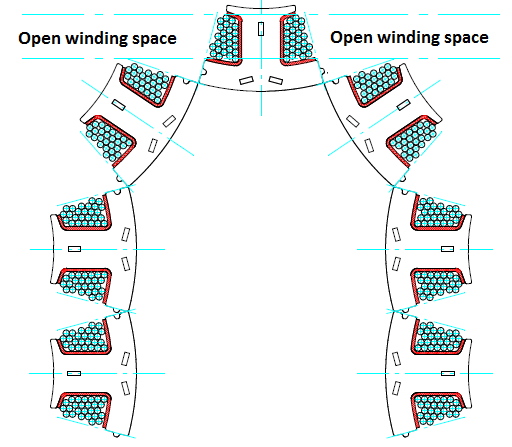
Schematics of an open winding space using a flyer winding process for chained pools

A disadvantage when using the flyer winding technique is the fact that only one tooth at a time can be wound. So, toothed chains are developing as a result but due to the wiring topology most of the stators have to be undone again. A simultaneous winding of multiple stator phases usually is not possible. If, however, the flyer winding technique for toothed chains requires auxiliary tools for placing the wire into the winding space or the linear arrangement needs to be given up when the winding of a single tooth takes place, the wire can be directly deposited with the needle winding technique. A special benefit when using the needle winding technique is provided by the possibility to wind all three phases at the same time depending on the type of stator circuitry. Especially advantageous is the behavior of the connecting wires between the coils of the individual phases at the rounding of the teeth if the linear arrangement of the teeth for the winding does not need to be given up. Therefore, it is opportune to make sure that the connecting wires pass through the center of the rounding radius.

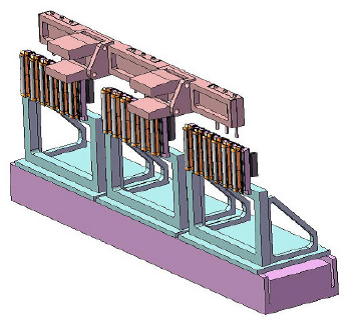
Three workpiece carrier with each one pole chain and a wire guide for a parallel winding of the phases U, V and W

Owing to this smart arrangement of the wires, it is possible to avoid changes in the wire length during rounding. When using the needle winding technique, it is quite common to wind multiple toothed chains simultaneously. This happens mainly on carrier tools or workpiece carriers that are positioned inside the needle winding machine. As the phases U, V and W as well as multiple stators can be wound at the same time, the needle winding technique has a high performance density in connection with the use of toothed chains.

=== Definition of the fill factors for motor coils ===
Electric motors must be compact and lightweight. They should also deliver a higher output with less copper usage. A prerequisite for this is an appropriate design of the coil body and suitable wire dimensions. One parameter of importance for the developer of motors is the electrical fill factor. The fill factor measures the ratio between the volume of a winding package and the volume needed to house the winding package. In case of stators, it can be said that the electrical fill factor is the ratio of the content of non-ferrous metals of the stator including the stator slot to the sum of the uninsulated copper cross sections. But in contrast to round coils, only the stator slot is considered. The reason for this is that merely the conductor strands in the stator slot contribute to the torque of the motor. The winding overhangs on the narrow sides of the winding cross section of a tooth only result in unwanted losses in the form of increasing electric resistance and undesired heat development.

=== Winding space examination of concentrated windings for stators ===
The required space for stator winding is designed by an iterative approach just as with the round coils. First, the parameter of the required number of windings, the required wire cross section and the maximum space provided by an insulated stator slot are considered for the calculation basis.

==== Example for calculating the fill factor of a stator lamination ====
An orthocyclic winding design for a stator with 40 windings per tooth at a wire diameter of 0.5 mm shall be calculated. The available insulated winding space is geometrically defined and has a surface of 35 mm^{2}. An insulation paper with a thickness of 0.25 mm is used.

• Determination of the mechanical fill factor

Given: Wire-Ø Cu 0,5mm → CU1L=0,548mm (Value according to norm) 40 turns, insulated winding space = 35mm^2, insulation paper 0,25mm

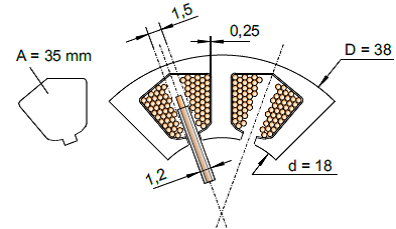
Geometry aspects for determining the mechanical fill factor; A= insulated winding space

When looking at the insulated winding space graphically and the required number of windings at a given wire diameter, it can be said that considering the space requirements for the winding nozzle (required groove width: about 3*0.548=1.6 mm) only 38 windings can be introduced into the winding space of the stator slot.

$$A= \frac{\pi \cdot D^2}{4} \cdot n \cdot 2$$
$$A= \frac{\pi \cdot 0.548^2}{4} \cdot 38 \cdot 2 = 17.9mm^2$$

A= Accumulated partial spaces of the insulated wires

D_{L}= wire gauge including the varnish coat

n= Number of turns per tooth

$$F_\text{mech}= A_\text{wire}/A_\text{winding space} \cdot 100\%$$
$$F_\text{mech}= 17.9mm^2 / 35mm^2 \cdot 100\%$$
$$F_\text{mech}= 51.1\%$$

• Determination of the electrical fill factor The theoretical consideration takes place by assuming that the uninsulated wire is to be found in the uninsulated groove.

Given: Wire-Ø Cu 0,5mm 38 turns, non-insulated winding space = 41mm^2

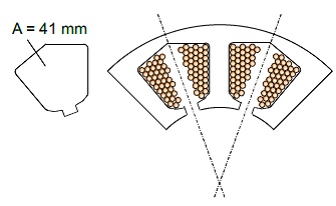
Geometry aspects for determining the electrical fill factor; A= non insulated winding space

$$A=\frac{\pi \cdot D^2}{4} \cdot n \cdot 2$$

A= Accumulated partial spaces of the non insulated wires

D_{Cu}= wire gauge excluding the varnish coat

n= Number of turns per tooth

$$A=\frac{\pi \cdot 0.5^2}{4} \cdot 38 \cdot 2 = 14.9mm^2$$
$$F_\text{electr}= A_\text{ wire }/A_\text{winding space} \cdot 100\%$$
$$F_\text{electr}= 14.9mm^2 / 41 mm^2 \cdot 100\%$$
$$F_\text{electr}= 36.3\%$$

== Bibliography ==
- Querfurth, William (1954). Coil Winding: A Description of Coil Winding Procedures, Winding Machines and Associated Equipment. University of Michigan: G. Stevens Mfg. Company.
- Gingery, David (1991). Build a Universal Coil Winding Machine. David J Gingery Publishing. ISBN 978-1878087102.
