= Jumble winding =

A jumble winding or scramble winding is a type of winding in which a wire is wound following a random and overlapping pattern on a spool. This winding type has no insulation between winding layers. The only insulation throughout is the insulation on the wire and that of the spool. Special sectioned spools are used for this type of winding. Devices that use jumble-wound coils include small electric motors, and some types of choke inductors.

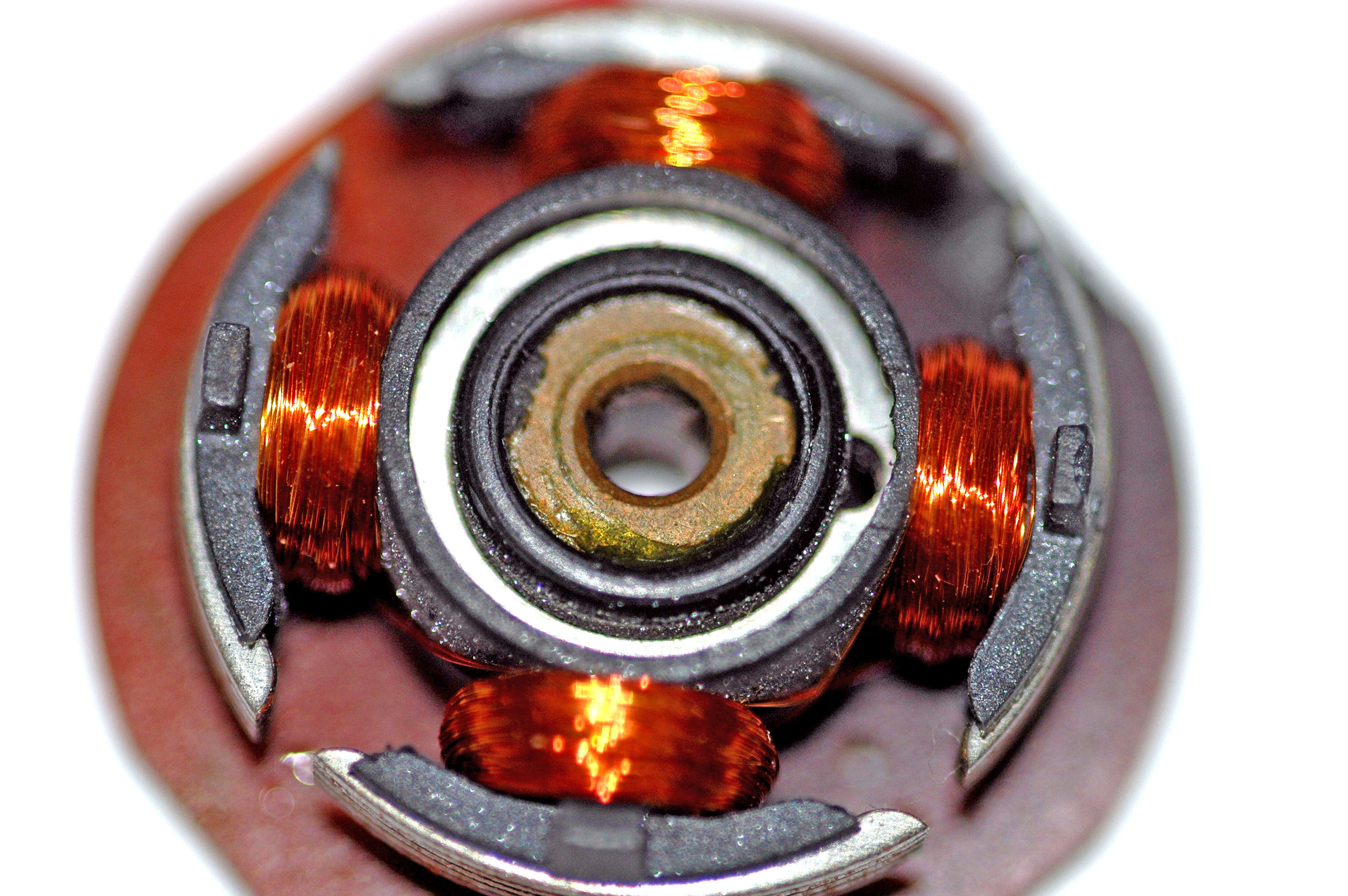
Miniature electric motor with jumble-wound coils (light copper color) on the four poles of the rotating armature.

== See also ==
- Coil winding technology#Wild winding
