= Slot insulation =

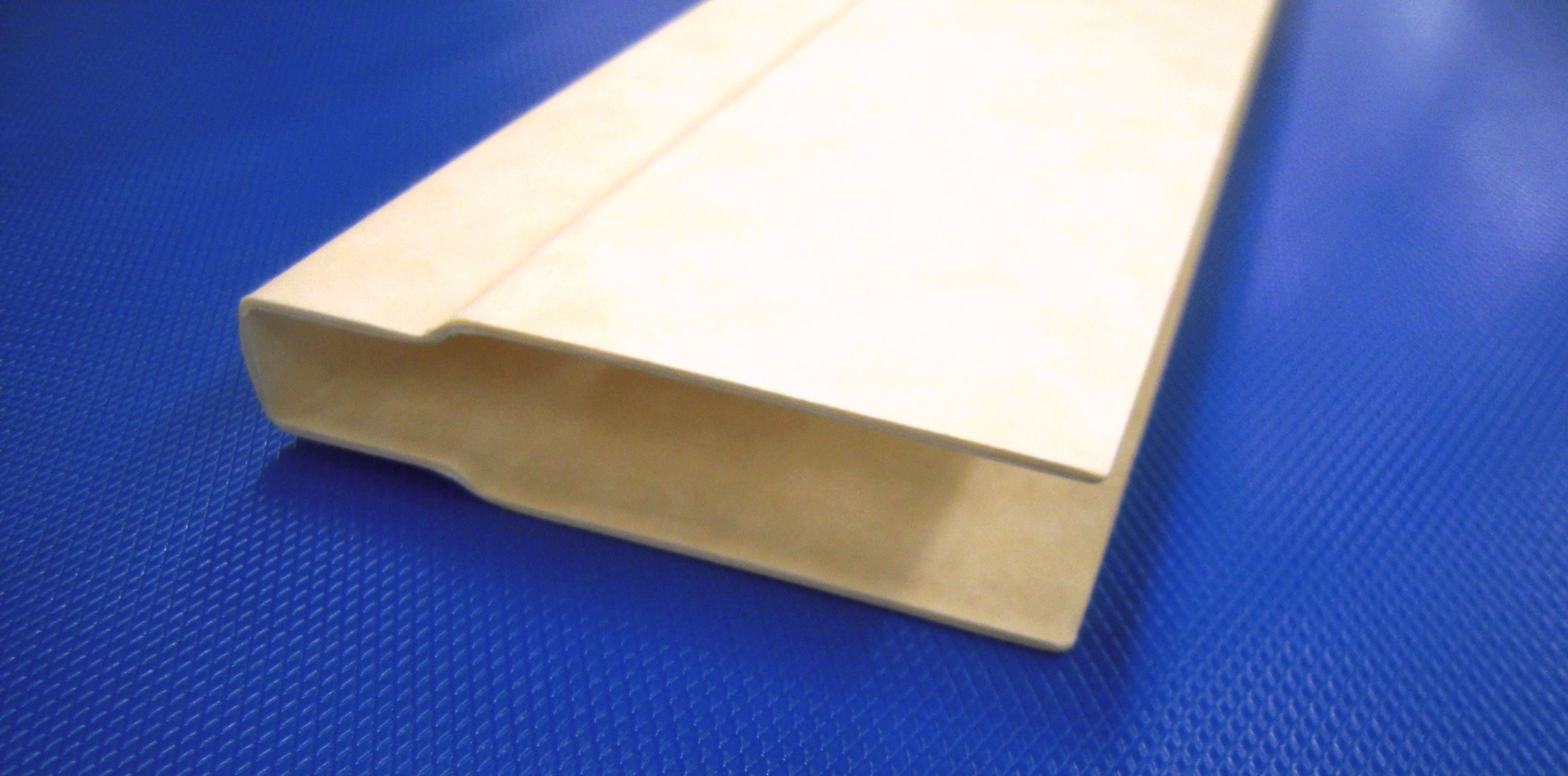
Custom "U" Slot Insulation with sidewall step

Slot insulation is the common name for shielding material used for the rotor inside a power generator. The slot insulation process for electric motors provides a barrier between the copper wirings and the steel lamination for all stator, armature and rotor products. This shielding material separates the rotor's electrically conductive winding from its body.

== Temperature ratings ==
Due to their operating environment, slot insulation must be capable of withstanding high temperatures. In the 1970s, slot insulation materials often had a Class F temperature rating (an operational range up to 155 °C). Today, there are commercially available slot insulation materials with a Class H temperature rating (an operational range up to 180 °C) Its composite of laminate materials, consisting of epoxy, aramid, and dielectric film, create its insulating properties.
