= Daisies (film) =

1966 Czechoslovak film by Věra Chytilová

- Theatrical release poster
- Directed by: Věra Chytilová
- Screenplay by: Ester Krumbachová; Věra Chytilová
- Story by: Věra Chytilová; Pavel Juráček
- Produced by: Rudolf Hájek
- Starring: Ivana Karbanová; Jitka Cerhová
- Cinematography: Jaroslav Kučera
- Edited by: Miroslav Hájek
- Music by: Jiří Šust; Jiří Šlitr
- Production company: Filmové studio Barrandov
- Distributed by: Ústřední Půjčovna Filmů; Kouzlo Films Společnost
- Release date: 30 December 1966 (Czechoslovakia)
- Running time: 76 minutes
- Country: Czechoslovakia
- Language: Czech

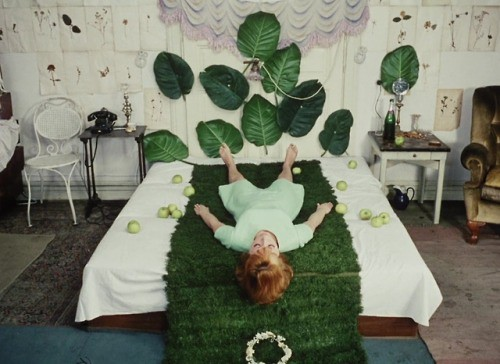
Marie II on the bed, showcasing the fragmented mise-en-scène of the film.

Daisies (Czech: Sedmikrásky) is a 1966 Czechoslovak satirical comedy film, co-written and directed by Věra Chytilová. Widely regarded as a milestone of the Czechoslovak New Wave, the film follows two young women, both named Marie (played by Jitka Cerhová and Ivana Karbanová), as they engage in a series of bizarre, rebellious and anarchic pranks. Originally conceived as a satire of bourgeois decadence, the film critiques societal norms and those who rigidly adhere to rules. Chytilová described the film as "a necrologue about a negative way of life." Daisies also subverts traditional gender stereotypes, redefining its heroines on their own terms. The film is noted for its critique of Communism, censorship, and patriarchy, and it was banned from theaters and export in the Czechoslovak Socialist Republic.

== Plot ==
The film opens with a title sequence alternating between shots of a spinning flywheel and wartime footage of airplanes strafing and bombing the ground. (Note: The shots of the airplanes are US Navy footage filmed in the Pacific Theater during World War II.)

The story begins with Marie I and Marie II sitting in bathing suits. Their movements are accompanied by creaking sounds, and their dialogue is delivered robotically. They conclude that since the world is "spoiled," they will also become spoiled. (Note: The DVD translates this as "bad" rather than "spoiled".)

The two Maries are later seen dancing in front of a tree bearing various types of fruit. (Note: Resembling the tree of the knowledge of good and evil.) After Marie II eats a peach, they return to their apartment. Marie I goes on a date with an older man, but Marie II interrupts, claiming to be Marie I's sister. She mocks the man, consumes large amounts of food, and disrupts his romantic advances. The trio eventually goes to a train station, where Marie I briefly boards the train with the man before sneaking off to return home with Marie II.

The Maries then visit a Prague nightclub, where they disrupt a 1920s-style dance performance and irritate the patrons with their drunken behavior. Later, Marie II attempts suicide by filling their apartment with gas but fails because she leaves a window open. Marie I scolds her for wasting gas.

In subsequent scenes, the Maries manipulate men for food and entertainment. They flirt with a man to secure a free meal, cry when he leaves, and then burst into laughter. Marie II visits a butterfly collector who professes his love for her, but she remains indifferent and only asks for food. The two also rob a friendly female bathroom attendant.

Back in their apartment, the Maries cut up phallic-shaped foods while the butterfly collector continues to declare his love for Marie II over the phone. They later attempt to send an older man off on a train, but he disembarks, leaving them to board the moving train without him.

Afterward, the Maries examine the names and phone numbers scribbled on their apartment walls. When a man arrives for Marie II, Marie I teases her and refuses to let him in. At a pool, the two confess that they no longer like each other.

Later, the Maries soak in a bathtub filled with milk and an egg, discussing existential themes such as life, death, and existence. Subsequently, in the countryside, they are ignored by a farmer and a group of cyclists, leading Marie II to question whether they still exist. They reaffirm their existence after encountering a mess they had previously made with stolen corn.

Back in their apartment, they cut each other apart with scissors. Then, the Maries sneak into a building's basement, take a mechanical dumbwaiter to an upper floor, and discover an elaborate feast. They devour the food, destroy the room, and swing from a chandelier, which eventually collapses, plunging them into water. They call for help from a nearby boat, but the sailors repeatedly dunk them into the water until they lose their grip. The Maries declare that they no longer wish to be spoiled.

In the final scene, (Note: An onscreen text says this is the best attempt by the Maries to undo their destruction.) the Maries return to the dining room, clean up the mess, and set the table with broken dishes and glasses. They whisper about becoming good and hardworking to achieve happiness. As they lie on the table, claiming to be happy, the chandelier falls on them. The film concludes with wartime footage (Note: Similar to the footage used in the title sequence.) and a dedication: "to those who get upset only over a stomped-upon bed of lettuce."

== Cast ==
- Ivana Karbanová as Marie II (the blonde) (Note: Her hair actually appears red or strawberry blonde)
- Jitka Cerhová as Marie I (the brunette)
- Marie Češková as woman in the bathroom
- Jiřina Myšková as toilet assistant
- Marcela Březinová as toilet assistant
- Julius Albert as older playboy
- Oldřich Hora as playboy
- Jan Klusák as younger playboy
- Josef Koníček as dancer
- Jaromír Vomáčka as happy gentleman

At the time of production, neither Karbanová nor Cerhová were professional actresses, the former being a salesclerk and the latter a student. Co-writer Ester Krumbachová described the protagonists as "a pair of silly young girls but they could just as well have been two generals." As of 2026, materials relating to the film's development are available online via the Ester Krumbachova Archive 2022–2026 project.

== Themes and style ==
Throughout the film, the two main characters serve as hyperbolical pawns for Chytilová's satirical approach to female stereotypes. There is a tangible anti-patriarchy sentiment in the film, observed through the two Maries' interactions with the men in their lives. Chytilová's extensive use of the "doll" metaphor is a means to show a male-dominated society's absurd expectations of women by overplaying their stereotypical attributions. In the beginning of the film, we see Marie 1 and Marie 2 sitting down and as they move, we hear creaking sounds as if coming from an un-oiled hinge. The opening establishes the metaphor of the women behaving as marionettes. The two female protagonists are also presented as being unruly, infantile, and lacking any purpose. A further use of the metaphor is depicting the protagonists as shallow and empty creatures, devoid of any human quality. Usually observed in sexist narratives, women are portrayed as lesser beings and by blowing these assumptions out of proportion, Chytilová aims to show the absurdity of the "patriarchal idea of femininity". Film writer Ela Bittencourt notes that Chytilová uses "the stereotype of how women are often infantilized and as a weapon right here in this film". Feminist criticism regarding the film often highlights the corporeality of the two Maries in understanding their bodies and how women's bodies have been portrayed. Throughout such scenes involving the overconsumption of food, which depicts the desire for indulgence and abundance, the fragmentation of their bodies, and their raucous laughter, the Maries have been examined as participating in the bodies they are often denied in cheerful defiance. Scholars like Anca Parvulescu have noted the film's emphasis as "an attack on manners" and "an attack on well-mannered spectatorship." The heroines as "infantilized women" with high-tone voices and their childish mannerisms is what is "expected of them" by the men in their lives as they do not realize the deliberate act both women put on.

The film was state-approved but had limitations in its production. Many conservative supporters of the communist-led government in Czechoslovakia criticized the film for its appropriation of gluttony and the alleged support it shows for the heroines. In an era of the socialist Czechoslovakia, Chytilová was "accused of nihilism” at the time of the release of Daisies. The film was condemned to be unfit for the communist ideas of the time, especially in regard to art, when socialist realism was ubiquitous. A visiting professor at Staffordshire University and author of The Czechoslovak New Wave, Peter Hames commented that the officials "objected primarily to its avant-garde form, the fact that the girls didn't provide a moral example, and they no doubt correctly saw it as an attack on establishment values". The food-fights and immense consumerism that Marie 1 and Marie 2 instigate were believed to be unrepresentative of the political agenda of the state, stemming rather from bourgeois ideals.

The film has little plot structure, scenes proceed from one to the next chaotically, frequently switching between black and white, color, and filtered or tinted footage. These stylistic choices in Daisies tie back to some of its themes. Both women are seen to generate destruction anywhere they go and this is reflected in the editing and montaging of the film. This kind of editing and collage-work may also indicate the multi-faceted nature of the marionettes, not as the simple creatures that patriarchal societies may make them out to be. Academic criticism has ranged from describing the film as ultimately anti-capitalist, anti-socialist, feminist, or with a variety of genre-confounding implications outside of the typical philosophical strains.

== Reception ==
=== Domestic ===
The film was positively received by Czech audiences and critics. Film critic Antonín J. Liehm wrote that Daisies was "a remarkable film not only for the viewers that appreciate its artistic significance, but also for those who just want to be entertained and might miss its magnitude on the first viewing". Author Milan Kundera called the film "masterly made" and wrote that the "monstrosity of the main characters was depicted elegantly, poetically, dreamlike and beautifully, but without becoming any less monstrous".

The Czech Film and Television Union awarded it the Trilobit Award for Best Czechoslovak movie of 1966. However, after being criticized by the communist MP Jaroslav Pružinec during interpellations in May 1967, the film was pulled from all major cinemas for "depicting the wanton" and was subsequently only screened in smaller venues.

=== International ===
The film was very well received in Europe. French journalist Pierre Billard, writing for L'Express, compared Daisies to Mack Sennett and Marx Brothers movies and called it "a grand celebration of absurdities with technical finesse and marvellous art direction so rarely achieved".

In the American press, the reception was mostly negative. Bosley Crowther described it in The New York Times as a "Pretentiously kookie and laboriously overblown mod farce about two playgirls who are thoroughly emptyheaded. Its stabs at humor and satire simply don't cut." New Zealander freelance film critic Carmen Gray directly addressed Crowther's assessment 55 years later by writing, "What he failed to recognize was that, under patriarchal and totalitarian oppression, clearing one's own mind can be a radical act of deprogramming." Gray also explained that the end title "takes aim at the hypocrisy of censuring such a spectacle while turning a blind eye to much graver abuses of power," the referenced spectacle being the scene involving both Maries trashing a feast.

It was also ranked the sixth greatest film directed by a woman in a 2019 BBC poll. On the review aggregator website Rotten Tomatoes, 88% of 34 critics' reviews are positive, with an average rating of 7.8/10. The website's consensus reads: "Stylistically anarchic and spiritedly played, Daisies is a liberating rebuke of polite society that will bring the rebel out of viewers who are up for the freewheeling ride."

== Awards ==
- Trilobit Award for the Best Czechoslovak movie of 1966.
- Grand Prix of the Belgian Film Critics Association for the best movie of 1968
