= The Miracle Game =

1972 novel by Josef Škvorecký

The Miracle Game (originally Mirákl) is a Czech novel by Josef Škvorecký published in 1972 by Sixty Eight Publishers in Toronto, Canada. It was translated into English in 1990 by Paul Wilson, and according to The Times is Skvorecky's masterpiece. It was his response to Prague Spring events of 1968 Czechoslovakia. and contains unflattering references to real people, Future Czech President Václav Havel becomes "the world-famous playwright Hejl", the writer Vladimír Páral appears as the "gifted non-party novelist Nabal".

== Plot introduction ==
In a Bohemian church in 1948 an apparent miracle is denounced as a hoax by the Communist party. Danny Smiricky (the hero of Škvorecký's 1977 novel The Engineer of Human Souls who also appeared in the previous novel "The Cowards") was present at the church but slept through the event. Twenty years later the case is re-examined during the Prague Spring.
