= Skoro na mizině =

- Genre: Comedy
- Directed by: Vladimír Skórka
- Starring: Albert Čuba; Štěpán Kozub; Robin Ferro; Vladimír Polák
- Country of origin: Czech Republic
- No. of series: 1
- No. of episodes: 8

Original release
- Network: YouTube
- Release: 22 April 2020 – 6 July 2021

Skoro na mizině (Almost broke), stylised as sKORO NA mizině to emphasize the word "corona", is a web comedy series by Mír Theater from 2020. Main roles featured members of the comedy group Three Tigers (Albert Čuba, Štěpán Kozub, Robin Ferro and Vladimír Polák). The series is a humorous reflection of critical situation for culture within the framework of protective measures against the spread of the coronavirus. Actors in the series play fictional versions of themselves in absurd and extreme situations. In addition to Ostrava actors, Jiří Langmajer, Michal Suchánek, Petr Kolečko or Marek Vašut appeared in the series. The series was also shown at the Serial Killer International Festival.

The director of the series is Vladimír Skórka, who also participated in the script together with Martin Šimíček, Michal Suchánek and Petr Koleček. In the spring of 2020, three parts of the series were broadcast. In autumn, however, thanks to the fan response, the creators decided to shoot two more parts. And in the summer of 2021, three more parts were broadcast.

== Cast ==
- Albert Čuba as himself (episodes 1–8)
- Štěpán Kozub as himself (episodes 1–8)
- Robin Ferro as himself (episodes 1–8)
- Vladimír Polák as himself (episodes 1–8)
- Jiří Langmajer as himself (episodes 1–3, 5–8)
- Michal Suchánek as himself (episodes 1, 3, 8)
- Petr Kolečko as himself (episodes 3, 5, 7–8)
- Jana Bernášková as herself (episodes 1–2)
- Rudolf Merkner as himself (episodes 1–2, 4)
- Honza Dědek as himself (episode 4)
- Barbora Jánová as Honza Dědek's assistant (episode 4)
- Milan Cimerák as himself (episode 4)
- Roman Mrázik as miner 1 (episodes 4–5)
- Robert Mikluš as miner 2 (episodes 4–5)
- Marek Vašut as himself (episode 5)
- Adéla Gondíková as herself (episodes 1, 6–8)
- Josef Kaluža as himself (episodes 1, 6–8)
- Václav Neužil as himself (episodes 7–8)
- Petr Rychlý as himself (episodes 7–8)
- Robert Rosenberg as himself (episodes 7–8)
- Paweł Deląg as himself (episode 8)
- Jakub Prachař as himself (episode 8)
- Kristýna Lipinová as Veronika, Čuba's assistant (episodes 1–3)
- Ondřej Malý as himself (episodes 1–2)
- Alena Sasínová-Polarczyk as Prudká (episodes 2–3)
- Přemysl Bureš as himself (episode 1)
- Michal Sedláček as himself (episode 1)
- Lada Bělašková as himself (episode 1)
- Beáta Hrnčiříková as herself (episode 1)
- Fredy & Krasty as himself (episodes 1–4)
- Eva Čubová as himself (episode 2)
- Lukáš Oramus as himself (episode 1)
- Jan Lefner as himself (episode 2)
- Dimitrij Dostál as himself (episode 1)
- Jana Juříčková as himself (episodes 1, 4)
- Petr Sedláček as himself (episode 1)
- Jaroslav Rusnák as himself (episode 1)
- Jiří Nekvasil as himself (episode 4)

== Episodes ==
Episode	Title	Release date
1	Došly prachy	22 April 2020
2	Profík	25 May 2020
3	Tresť	8 June 2020
4	Druhá vlna	20 November 2020
5	Zával	17 January 2021
6	Rododendron	20 June 2021
7	Terapie	27 June 2021
8	Noemova archa	6 July 2021

== Reception ==
In 2021, the series was nominated for the Czech Film Critics' Awards in the non-cinema category. The series was also shortlisted for the Trilobit Audiovisual Award nominations.
