= The Very Late Afternoon of a Faun =

- Directed by: Věra Chytilová
- Written by: Věra Chytilová; Ester Krumbachová
- Starring: Leos Sucharípa
- Cinematography: Jan Malír
- Edited by: Alois Fisárek
- Release date: 1983
- Running time: 99 minutes
- Country: Czechoslovakia
- Language: Czech

The Very Late Afternoon of a Faun (Czech: Faunovo velmi pozdní odpoledne) is a 1983 Czechoslovak comedy film adapted from the Jiří Brdečka 1966 novel of the same name; directed by Věra Chytilová. This was Chytilová's only post Soviet invasion collaboration with screenwriter Ester Krumbachová.

== Cast ==
- Leoš Suchařípa as Faun
- Libuše Pospíšilová as Boss
- Vlasta Špicnerová as Vlasta
- Jirí Hálek as Josef, Faun's friend
- Ivan Vyskočil as Tonda, colleague
- František Kovářík as Starik
- Alena Ambrová as Alenka
- Tereza Kučerová as Tereza
- Ivana Chýlková as Katerina
- Stanislava Coufalová as Zdenička
- Marie Vápeníková as Petra
- Jana Špaňurová as Young lady on the bridge
- Ella Šárková as Anita
