= Valerie and Her Week of Wonders (film) =

1970 film by Jaromil Jireš

- Original Czech theatrical release poster
- Czech: Valerie a týden divů
- Directed by: Jaromil Jireš
- Screenplay by: Ester Krumbachová; Jaromil Jireš; Jiří Musil (dialogue)
- Based on: Valerie and Her Week of Wonders by Vítězslav Nezval
- Produced by: Jirí Becka
- Starring: Jaroslava Schallerová; Helena Anýžová; Petr Kopřiva; Jiří Prýmek
- Cinematography: Jan Čuřík
- Edited by: Josef Valušiak
- Music by: Luboš Fišer
- Production company: Filmové studio Barrandov
- Distributed by: Ústřední půjčovna filmů
- Release dates: 3 September 1970 (Gran Premio Bergamo); 16 October 1970 (Czechoslovakia)
- Running time: 77 minutes
- Country: Czechoslovakia
- Language: Czech

Valerie and Her Week of Wonders (Czech: Valerie a týden divů) is a 1970 Czechoslovak Gothic coming-of-age surrealist dark fantasy-horror film co-written and directed by Jaromil Jireš, based on the 1935 novel by Vítězslav Nezval. It is considered one of the last films of the Czechoslovak New Wave movement. The film portrays the heroine as living in a disorienting dream, cajoled by priests, vampires, and men and women alike. The film blends dark fantasy, eroticism and Gothic horror genres.

== Plot ==
Valerie, a 13-year-old girl, is asleep when a thief steals her earrings; as she tries to investigate, she is startled by a horrific man, the Constable, who wears a mask. The thief returns her earrings the next day, angering the Constable. Back at her house, Valerie's grandmother, Elsa, tells her that the earrings were left behind by Valerie's mother upon joining a convent. Previously, the earrings belonged to the Constable, who also owned their house. Valerie also learns that a group of missionaries and a company of actors are coming to town. During her neighbor Hedvika's wedding, Valerie sees the Constable watching her in the crowd and her grandmother also seems to recognize him. Valerie receives a letter from the thief, Orlík ("Eaglet"), warning her that the Constable, his uncle, killed Orlík's parents and now wants Valerie's earrings back. Orlík asks Valerie to meet him at the church that evening; when they meet, he does not hide his attraction to her.

Later, Valerie meets the Constable in the street, in disguise; he leads Valerie to a spyhole into a chamber where her grandmother threatens to whip herself in an attempt to win back the love of a past lover, a priest named Gracián. Orlík takes Valerie away and tells her that his uncle is in love with her. The Constable meets Elsa, who calls him Richard and says she has loved no-one since he seduced and abandoned her when she was 17. He promises to make her young again if she sells him the house that Valerie will inherit. Meanwhile, Orlík gives Valerie a pearl for protection, then hides her from Richard again. At a picnic, Gracián tells Valerie that Orlík is her brother. That night, Gracián comes into her bedroom and attempts to rape her, but she swallows the pearl to protect herself. Meanwhile, Richard and Elsa sneak into Hedvika's; while Hedvika and her husband consummate their marriage, Elsa bites her on the neck, stealing the blood necessary to become young again.

Valerie finds Orlík bound to a waterfall by Richard. Valerie frees Orlík and takes him to her house, avoiding his romantic intentions by blindfolding him, since she now thinks they are siblings. They discover Gracián hanging dead from Valerie's window and take the body to a crypt under Valerie's house; Elsa is there, now a vampire. Disguised as a young woman, Elsa introduces herself as a distant cousin and tells Valerie that her grandmother left suddenly. She tries to bite Valerie, then restrains her while she is asleep and steals the earrings. Elsa imprisons Valerie, who then observes Elsa having sex with a man and then killing him, then attempting to seduce Orlík, who instead steals the earrings again.

Orlík frees Valerie, returns her earrings, and confesses his love for her. He tries to explain that he is not her father's son, but Richard's, but Valerie runs away. She has guessed Elsa is actually her grandmother, and started to feel something for Richard, who is dying. Valerie steals a chicken from the market and takes it to Richard, who has just told Elsa that he is Valerie's father, and that Valerie's blood is the key to their survival. When Valerie heals Richard, he reverts to being a monster and attacks her. He plans to transplant Orlík's heart into Valerie to make her immortal, but Elsa wants it for herself. Valerie, pretending to be unconscious, overhears everything. She revives Gracián, who was not actually dead, and finds a goodbye letter from Orlík.

Valerie meets Hedvika, sick from Elsa's bite and depressed about her marriage. They retreat into Hedvika's bedroom and spend the night together, after which Hedvika is healed. Outside, Gracián tells a crowd that Valerie is a witch who tempted him into sin. He orders her captured and burned at the stake, but Valerie swallows the magic earrings and escapes unharmed. In the crypt, now a brothel, Valerie tricks Richard into drinking one of the earrings, turning him into a polecat. In a progressively more dreamlike sequence, Valerie reunites with Orlík, revealed to be one of the actors; then Elsa, who does not recall anything that has happened; then her long-lost parents. Everyone dances around Valerie in the forest, while the virgins sing for her. Eventually, she falls asleep in a bed in the forest, alone.

== Cast ==
- Jaroslava Schallerová as Valerie
- Helena Anýžová as Grandmother Elsa/Mother/Redhead
- Petr Kopřiva as Orlík
- Jiří Prýmek as Constable/Richard
- Jan Klusák as Gracián
- Karel Engel as Coachman Ondřej
- Alena Stojáková as Hedvika
- Otto Hradecký as Farmer
- Eva Olmerová as Maid (uncredited)

== Production ==
The original screenplay was written by Ester Krumbachová, who is also credited with production design on the movie. The screenplay was approved in late April 1968. The film was supposed to be directed by Krumbachová's husband Jan Němec. However, after the Warsaw Pact invasion of Czechoslovakia in August 1968, Němec was fired from Barrandov film studio and was not allowed to direct. The project then went to Jireš, and despite Jireš's 1969 feature The Joke being banned by communist authorities, production proceeded on Valerie. Jaroslava Schallerová was chosen from 1,500 girls who auditioned for the role. She was 13 years old at the time of filming.

Filming took place between June 28 and November 6, 1969. The Czech town of Slavonice was chosen as the main filming location, because of its preserved renaissance-era town centre. The local people played extras. Some scenes were shot in nearby Kostelní Vydří monastery. Robert Nezval, son of the author of the novel Vítězslav Nezval, appears in the film as a boy with a drum.

== Release ==
=== Home media ===
In January 2004, the film was released on DVD in the United States and Canada by Facets Video. In June of that same year, the film was released on DVD in the UK by Redemption Films Ltd. In June 2015, the film was released on DVD and Blu-ray by The Criterion Collection, featuring a 4K digital restoration; three early short films by director Jireš, Uncle (1959), Footprints (1960), and The Hall of Lost Steps (1960); interviews from 2006 with Jaroslava Schallerová and Jan Klusák; and an alternate psychedelic folk soundtrack by the Valerie Project.

=== Soundtrack ===
The film soundtrack, featuring music composed by Luboš Fišer, was released for the first time in December 2006 by Finders Keepers Records. Available both on CD and LP, the booklet reveals previously unseen archive images, international poster designs, as well as notes by the label founder Andy Votel, a film professor Peter Hames and Trish Keenan from the band Broadcast. In 2006, members of New Weird America acts Espers, Fern Knight, Fursaxa and other musicians formed The Valerie Project. The group performed original compositions in unison with the film from 2006 to 2008. An alternative soundtrack was made by The Valerie Project in 2006.

== Critical reception ==
On the review aggregator website Rotten Tomatoes, the film holds an approval rating of 81% based on 21 reviews, with an average rating of 7.4/10. The New York Times called the film "Consistently and humorously anticlerical", writing that it "may be the most exotic flower to bloom on the grave of the Prague Spring, but it's one with deep roots in 20th-century Czech culture". Kevin Thomas of the Los Angeles Times, praised the film calling it "dazzlingly surreal", comparing the film to the work of Ingmar Bergman's The Seventh Seal.

Jordan Cronk of Slant Magazine wrote that the film "may be a willfully enigmatic, even obtuse viewing experience, but every frame continues to vibrate with energy and thrum with life", and gave the film a rating of three-and-a-half out of five stars.

University of Nebraska–Lincoln film studies professor Wheeler Winston Dixon wrote in his book Visions of Paradise: Images of Eden in the Cinema "The film's brevity and its seductive mise-en-scène, sumptuously photographed by Jan Cuřík, make the film seem almost an outlaw project, or an act of social criticism designed to enforce atheism by embracing an anti-Catholic stance, particularly in relation to sexual morality."

In the book 101 Horror Films You Must See Before You Die, author and professor at Brunel University Tanya Krzywinska called the film "an exquisitely crafted fairy tale woven around the sexual awakening of a young woman". Krzywinska also noted that, although the film shared many similarities with softcore pornographic films of the period, "it seeks a broader canvas in a blend of attributes drawn from both high and low culture." Krzywinska also noted the film's elements of gothic horror and fairy tales, as well as its use of symbolic imagery.

The film is sometimes referred to as an example of folk horror films.

=== Influence ===
Many writers have cited similarities between the film and the work of English writer Angela Carter, who saw the film during its release in England. Her screenplay for The Company of Wolves (1984) adapted from Carter's short stories, in collaboration with director Neil Jordan, bears a direct or indirect influence.

The title and aesthetics of Molly Santana's second album Molly and Her Week of Wonders (2025) are based on the film.

== See also ==
- Vampire film
