= Tainted Horseplay =

1989 Czechoslovak drama film

- Directed by: Věra Chytilová
- Written by: Věra Chytilová; Pavel Skapík
- Starring: Tomáš Hanák, Milan Steindler; David Vávra
- Cinematography: Jaroslav Brabec
- Release date: 1 March 1989
- Running time: 129 minutes
- Country: Czechoslovakia
- Language: Czech

Tainted Horseplay (Czech: Kopytem sem, kopytem tam, literally: A Hoof Here, a Hoof There) is a Czechoslovak drama film directed by Věra Chytilová and released in 1989. The film was entered into the 16th Moscow International Film Festival. The film was selected as the Czechoslovak entry for the Best Foreign Language Film at the 62nd Academy Awards, but was not accepted as a nominee.

== Cast and characters ==
- Tomáš Hanák as Pepe
- Milan Steindler as Grandpa
- David Vávra as Frantisek
- Tereza Kučerová as Jirina
- Bára Dlouhá as Jana
- Chantal Poullain as Foreign woman (as Chantal Poullain-Polívková)
- Jiří Bartoška
- Josef Kobr

== See also ==
- List of submissions to the 62nd Academy Awards for Best Foreign Language Film
- List of Czechoslovak submissions for the Academy Award for Best Foreign Language Film
