= Věra Chytilová =

Czech film director (1929–2014)

- Born: 2 February 1929; Ostrava, Czechoslovakia
- Died: 12 March 2014 (aged 85); Prague, Czech Republic
- Occupation: Film director
- Years active: 1962–2011
- Spouse: Jaroslav Kučera
- Children: 2, including Tereza

Věra Chytilová (Czech: [ˈvjɛra ˈxɪcɪlovaː]; 2 February 1929 – 12 March 2014) was a Czech avant-garde filmmaker. Banned by the Czechoslovak government in the 1960s, she is best known for her 1966 Czech New Wave film Daisies. Among her subsequent films are Wolf's Hole (1987), A Hoof Here, a Hoof There (1989) and The Inheritance or Fuckoffguysgoodday (1992). For her work, she received the French Ordre des Arts et des Lettres, the Czech Medal of Merit and the Czech Lion award.

== Early life and education ==
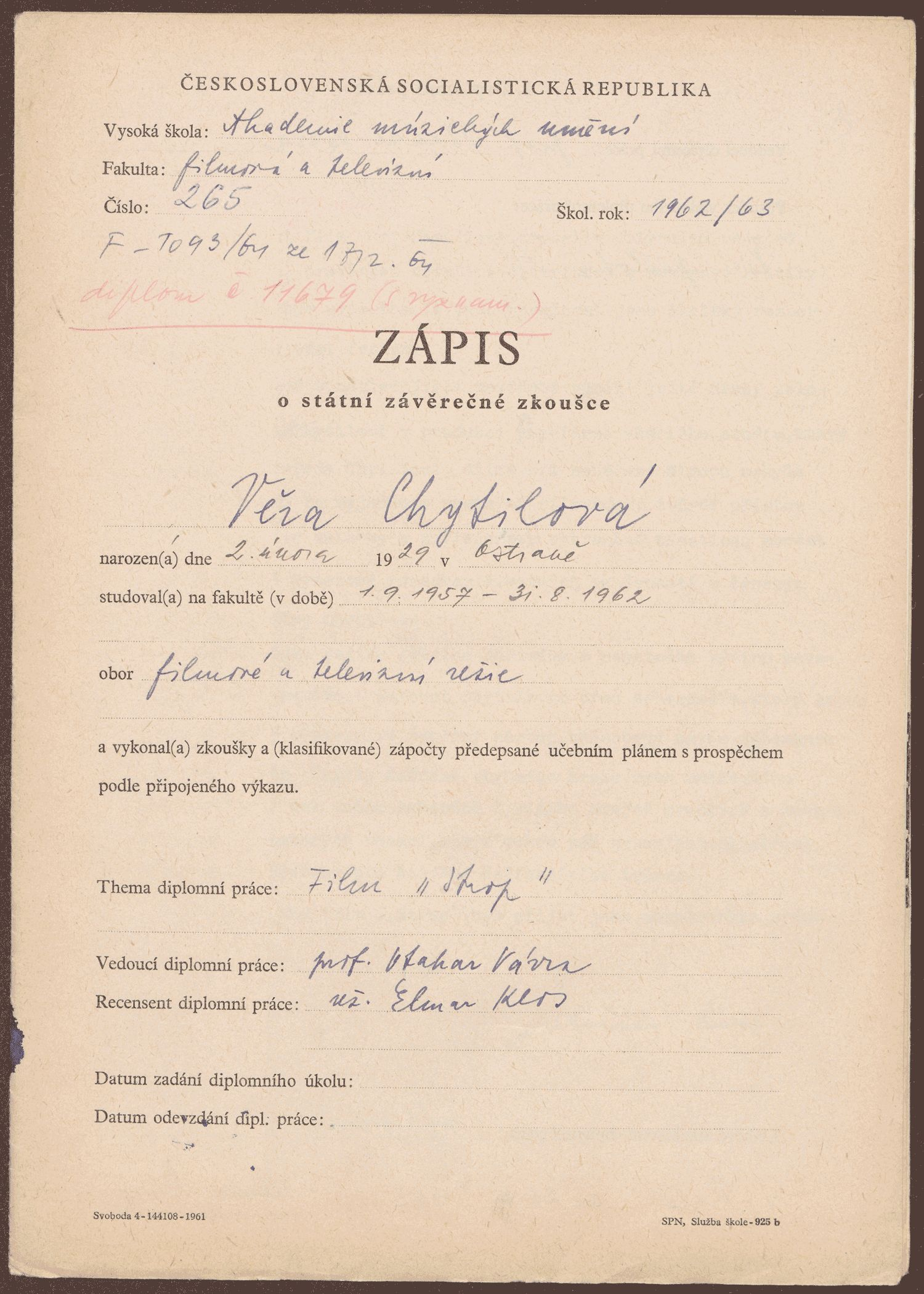
Record of the final state exam and report on the diploma thesis of Věra Chytilová (1963)

Chytilová was born in Ostrava, Czechoslovakia, on 2 February 1929. She had a strict Catholic upbringing, which would later come to influence many of the moral questions presented in her films.

While attending college in Brno, Chytilová initially studied philosophy and architecture, but abandoned these fields. She then worked as a draftswoman, a fashion model and as a photo re-toucher before working as a clapper girl for the Barrandov Film Studios in Prague. She then sought a recommendation from Barrandov Film Studios to study film production, but was denied. Undeterred by the rejection, she would later be accepted into the Film and TV School of the Academy of Performing Arts in Prague (FAMU) at the age of 28, the first woman to study directing at the school. While attending FAMU, she studied underneath renowned film director Otakar Vavra, before graduating in 1962. Chytilová's dedication to her artistic vision manifested early in her studies, with her graduation film's screenplay, Strop/Ceiling, being rejected by her professor for its kitschy nature. After getting her classmate Pavel Juráček to rewrite the script for their professor's approval, she defiantly shot the original script.

== Career ==
Upon her graduation from FAMU, both of Chytilová's short films saw theatrical release throughout Czechoslovakia. In 1963, Chytilová released her first feature film entitled Something Different.

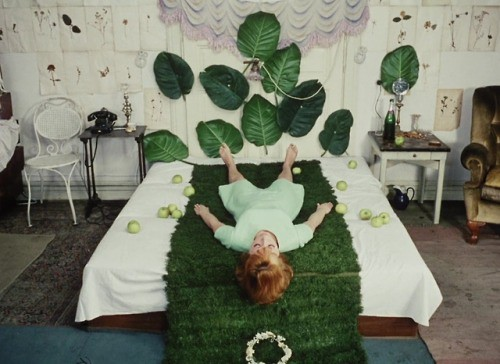
Still frame of Daisies (1966)

Chytilová is best known for her once highly controversial film Sedmikrásky (Daisies; 1966). Daisies is known for its unsympathetic characters, lack of a continuous narrative, and abrupt visual style. Chytilová states that she structured Daisies to "restrict [the spectator's] feeling of involvement and lead him to an understanding of the underlying idea or philosophy".

In 1966, Vera Chytilová’s Daisies was banned from screening in her home country of Czechoslovakia for over a year, due to the depictions of gross food waste at a time in which food shortages were plaguing the area. In the film, the two main characters, Marie I and Marie II, not only present the folly of bored, spoiled middle-class women, but also their own helplessness as young women devoured by a society that values them only as sexual objects and is, as they say, spoiled anyway. The characters justify their cathartic behavior to themselves saying ‘If the world is rotten, let us also be rotten’. Chytilová battled censorship of this film for her biting anti-corruption and consumption critiques, still managing to win the Grand Prix at the Bergamo Film Festival in Italy. The film would cement Chytilová’s film career, gaining public notoriety not just in her home country but around the world.

After the Czechoslovak liberalization of 1968 led by Alexander Dubček, widespread reforms decentralized the government and lessened restrictions on the press, granting artists like Chytilová creative freedoms they previously did not possess.

It was in this climate that Chytilová would begin working on her next film, Ovoce stromů rajských jíme (Fruit of Paradise; 1969), an experimental and psychedelic retelling of the story of Creationism, from an avant-garde, liberal perspective. After months of tense negotiation, the Soviet Union responded to the reformations by invading the CSR with the armies of the other Warsaw Pact nations and swiftly taking control of their government. The removal of Dubček marks the end of the Czech New Wave, as the Soviet Union not only rolled back the social reforms, but imposed even harsher restrictions on the press and centralized the government as a part of the Soviet Union. Chytilová and many others like her were forced to choose between filmmaking and their home country.

Vera Chytilová was banned from filmmaking for seven years, still working under her husband's name until she was approached by the government, this time imploring her to make films for their state-run studio, Short Film Studios in 1976. Around the same time, she was invited to attend a newly assembled Year of Women film festival in the US that her government would not let her attend. The festival had asked to screen Daisies and Chytilová revealed that she had no uncensored prints of the film and that she was no longer allowed to make films. She was aware of two uncensored prints in Paris and Brussels, but neither were in her possession.

As a result, the festival began applying international pressure on the Czechoslovak government by petitioning on Chytilová's behalf. With this pressure, Chytilová wrote a letter directly to President Gustáv Husák detailing her career and personal belief in socialism.

Due to the success of the pressure campaign and Chytilová's appeal to President Husak, Chytilová began production of Hra o jablko (The Apple Game, 1976). The Apple Game was completed and subsequently screened at the Karlovy Vary International Film Festival and the Chicago International Film Festival, where it won the Silver Hugo.

After the release of The Apple Game, Chytilová was allowed to continue making films but was continually met with controversy and heavy censorship by the Czechoslovak government. Věra Chytilová's last film was released in 2006, and she taught directing at FAMU.

In 2026, materials relating to Chytilová's collaborations with Ester Krumbachová were made avalible online through the Ester Krumbachová Archive, including a 1990s unrealised project using the Maries characters of Daisies.

== Themes ==
Like many Czech New Wave filmmakers, Chytilová was influenced by post-Stalin Czechoslovakia in the 1950s. Chytilová sought to display the hypocrisy of the government by presenting the complete opposite. Chytilová was anti-consumerist and called herself an individualist, rather than a feminist.

Women star in almost all of Chytilová's films and ideas of gender, sex, and power are at the central idea of her films.

Czech society was the primary focus of Chytilová's work, although the style of Czech New Wave filmmakers was to have international relevancy.

Chytilová's films before the Soviet invasion of Czechoslovakia were highly experimental, known for psychedelic colors and nonlinear editing. Daisies and Fruits of Paradise can be characterized by absurdism and surrealism. The color filters and other experimental tactics Chytilová used were exclusive to her films of the 1960s.

== Legacy ==
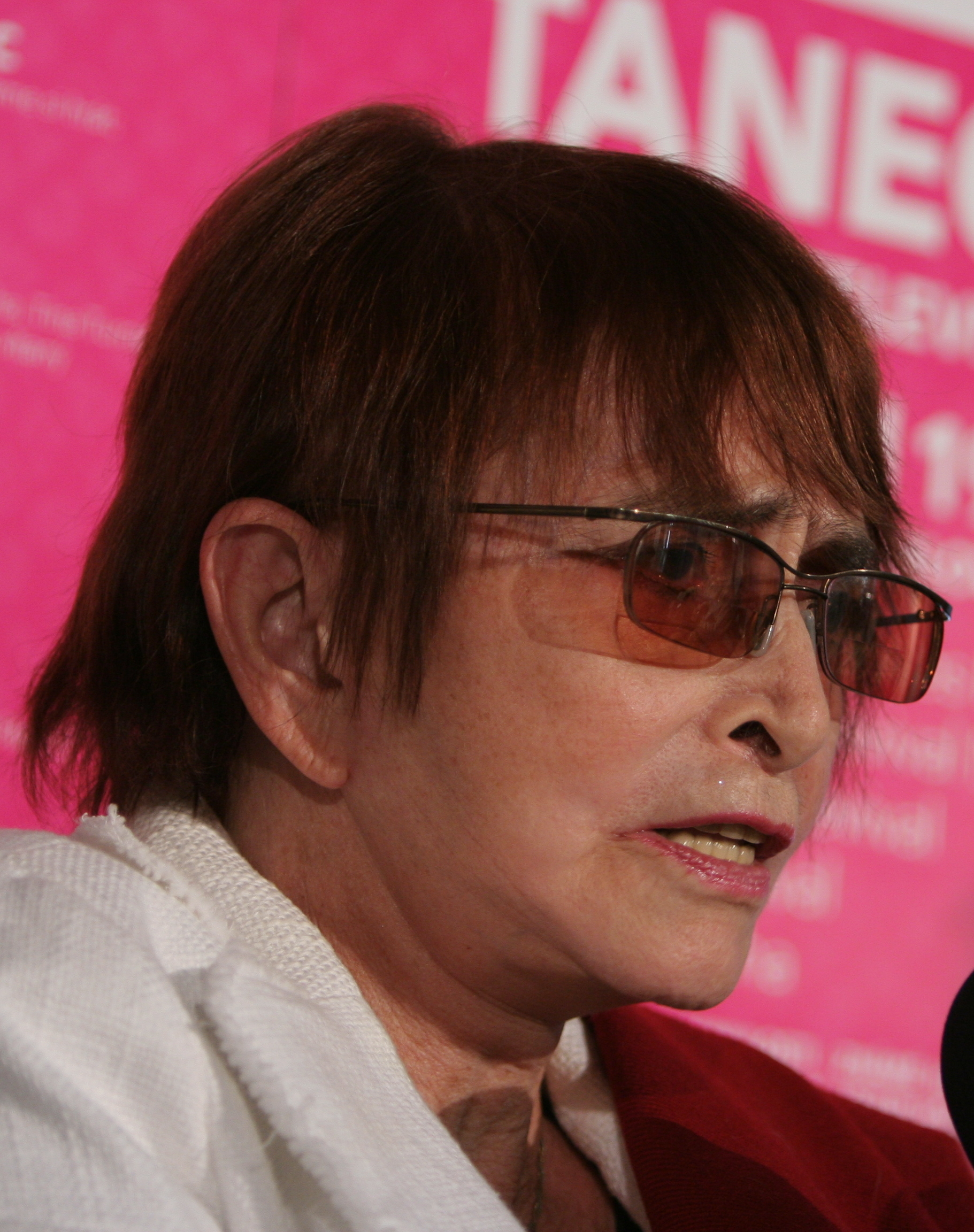
Chytilová at the 2007 Karlovy Vary International Film Festival

Chytilová described herself as a control freak and, "An overheated kettle that you can't turn down". Chytilová's "overheated" attitude made it difficult for her to gain work within the Soviet Union controlled film industry. She was known as being actively critical of the Soviet Union, stating that "My critique is in the context of the moral principles you preach, isn't it? A critical reflection is necessary". She would routinely cause havoc and "hysterical scenes" to attempt to make films that were loyal to her vision regardless of the heavy censorship that was routinely imposed.

Chytilová embodied a unique cinematographic language and style that does not rely on any literary or verbal conventions, but rather utilizes various forms of visual manipulations to create meaning within her films. Chytilová used observations of everyday life in accordance with allegories and surreal contexts to create a personalized film style that is greatly influenced by the French New Wave, and Italian neorealism.

Chytilová actively used a filmic style similar to cinéma vérité in order to allow the audience to gain an outside perspective of the film. Her use of cinéma vérité is best illustrated in her 1966 film, Daisies, in which these techniques create a "philosophical documentary, of diverting the spectator from the involvement, destroying psychology and accentuates the humor". Through these manipulations Chytilová created a disjunctive viewing experience for her audience forcing them to question the meaning of her films.

Chytilová is cited as a militant feminist filmmaker. Josef Škvorecký states that, "In a true feminist tradition Vera combined intensive intellectual effort with a feminine feeling for beauty and form". Daisies is seen as a feminist film due to its attitude and active critique of male attitudes towards sex. However, Chytilová did not see herself as a feminist filmmaker, but rather believed in individualism, stating that if a person does not believe in a particular set of conventions or rules then it is up to that individual to break them.

== Personal life and death ==
Chytilová was born in Ostrava, Czechoslovakia, on 2 February 1929. She refused to leave Czechoslovakia after the Soviet Union Invasion of 1968 stating that "Making films then became a mission". She married cinematographer Jaroslav Kučera whom she met while attending FAMU. During the Soviet Union occupation, when Chytilová could not find work as a director, she and her husband built their family home and raised their children – an artist Tereza Kučerová (born 1964) and cinematographer Štěpán Kučera (born 1968).

Chytilová died on 12 March 2014 in Prague, surrounded by her family, after long-term health issues.

== Selected filmography ==
Year	Title	Director	Screenplay	Story	Music	Notes
1961	The Ceiling	X mark	X mark			
1962	A Bagful of Fleas	X mark	X mark	X mark		
1963	Something Different	X mark	X mark	X mark		
1966	"At the World Cafeteria" in Pearls of the Deep	X mark				
1966	Daisies	X mark	X mark	X mark		
1970	Fruit of Paradise	X mark	X mark			
1976	The Apple Game	X mark	X mark	X mark		
1978	Inexorable Time	X mark				
1979	Prefab Story	X mark	X mark	X mark		
1981	Calamity	X mark	X mark			
1981	Chytilová Versus Forman − Consciousness of Continuity	X mark				
1983	The Very Late Afternoon of a Faun	X mark	X mark			
1984	Prague: The Restless Heart of Europe	X mark	X mark	X mark		
1987	Wolf's Hole	X mark	X mark			
1987	The Jester and the Queen	X mark	X mark			
1988	A Hoof Here, a Hoof There	X mark	X mark			
1990	Tomáš Garrigue Masaryk, a Liberator	X mark				
1991	My Citizens of Prague Understand Me	X mark		X mark		
1992	The Inheritance or Fuckoffguysgoodday	X mark	X mark			
1998	Traps	X mark		X mark		
2000	Flights and Falls	X mark	X mark	X mark		
2001	Exile from Paradise	X mark	X mark	X mark	X mark	
2005	Searching for Ester	X mark				
2006	Pleasant Moments	X mark	X mark			
