= Case for a Rookie Hangman =

1970 Czechoslovak drama film

- Title screen from the opening credits
- Directed by: Pavel Juráček
- Written by: Pavel Juráček
- Based on: Gulliver's Travels by Jonathan Swift
- Starring: Lubomír Kostelka
- Cinematography: Jan Kališ
- Edited by: Miroslav Hájek
- Music by: Luboš Fišer
- Production company: Filmové studio Barrandov
- Distributed by: Ústřední půjčovna filmů
- Release date: 3 August 1970
- Running time: 102 minutes
- Country: Czechoslovakia
- Language: Czech

Case for a Rookie Hangman (Czech: Případ pro začínajícího kata) is a Czechoslovak drama film directed by Pavel Juráček. It was released in 1970. The movie belongs to the Czech New Wave.

The movie can be classified as a surrealist or absurdist satire, and it is based loosely on the third book of Gulliver's Travels by Jonathan Swift, but the story is transferred to an early 20th-century world in decay. The movie shows also the influence of Franz Kafka and Lewis Carroll (Alice's Adventures in Wonderland).

The satire is aimed at the Czechoslovak society, and the movie was soon banned after its release in 1970. That meant also the end of Juráček's career.

== Cast ==
- Lubomír Kostelka – Lemuel Gulliver
- Klára Jerneková – Markéta
- Milena Zahrynowská – Dominika
- Radovan Lukavský – Professor Beiel
- Jiří Janda – Patrik
- Luděk Kopřiva – Vilém Seid
- Miloš Vávra – Emil
- Miroslav Macháček – Munodi

== Release and home media ==
Asociace Ceských Filmových Klubu re-released the film to Czech theaters in 2002.

Second Run released the film to UK Blu-ray in 2019.
