= A Report on the Party and the Guests =

1966 film

A Report on the Party and Guests
- Film poster
- Directed by: Jan Němec
- Written by: Ester Krumbachová; Jan Němec
- Produced by: Jan Procházka
- Starring: Ivan Vyskočil; Jan Klusák; Jiří Němec; Pavel Bošek; Karel Mareš; Evald Schorm; Jana Prachařová; Zdena Škvorecká; Helena Pejsková
- Cinematography: Jaromír Sofr
- Edited by: Miroslav Hájek
- Music by: Karel Mares
- Production company: Filmové Studio Barrandov
- Distributed by: Sigma III
- Release date: 30 December 1966
- Running time: 71 minutes
- Country: Czechoslovakia
- Language: Czech

A Report on the Party and Guests (Czech: O slavnosti a hostech, also known in English as The Party and the Guests) is a 1966 Czechoslovak political satire film directed by Jan Němec. It was banned in Czechoslovakia from 1966 to 1968 for being an allegory of socialist regimes. After a short release during the Prague Spring, it was banned again, this time for twenty years. In 1974, director Jan Němec was forced to leave the country.

The film was entered in the 1968 Cannes Film Festival, but the festival was aborted owing to the events of May 1968 in France.

== Plot ==
A group of four men and three women are having a picnic in a field. One of the women says they should get going so they will make it to a celebration on time, and the group cleans up and walks into the woods. A man emerges from the trees and, smiling, links arms with Karel, one of the picnickers. Several other men appear and forcibly direct the picnickers to a clearing.

The group of men bring a table and chair out of the woods and place it in the clearing. Their leader sits down and asks the picnickers if they are enjoying their trip to the country. Karel demands to be told what is going on, but the leader's second-in-command just tells the picnickers to spread out. A male picnicker wearing glasses separates the women from the men and arranges each group alphabetically before stepping forward. The second-in-command draws a circle around the six other picnickers, and the leader says they cannot cross the line. Karel tells the leader to leave them alone, but the other picnickers ask him to stop being defiant. The picnicker wearing glasses diplomatically tries to discover why he and his friends have been stopped, and the leader eventually says this has all been a joke. One of the female picnickers says she needs to go to the bathroom and is let out of the circle and led into the woods. Karel says he is leaving and crosses the line without permission. The leader goes after Karel, who knocks him down, so he sics his followers on Karel. They push Karel around and are throwing him in the air when the woman returns from the woods with a man. He tells the leader, who is named Rudolf, to apologize to the picnickers, saying he had sent Rudolf to show them a shortcut to his birthday celebration. The host tells the picnickers he adopted Rudolf the day before and apologizes himself. The picnickers respond by putting the blame for the interaction in the clearing on Karel as much as on Rudolf. Some other guests come out of the trees and exchange greetings with the picnickers before everyone walks down a steep slope through the woods to reach a lake. There are numerous tables and chairs on the shore, complete with white tablecloths and fancy table settings.

When dinner is about to start, one of the picnickers starts to cry. She reveals her husband, who had not said anything in the clearing, has left. Everyone begins to eat before she notices she has sat at the wrong place, which prompts her and almost everyone else to switch to their assigned seats. The host, annoyed by the commotion, asks Rudolf why there is not an empty chair if one of his guests is not there. Rudolf begins to look for a missing chair and the host tries to find out why the husband left. None of the picnickers can understand why he responded differently to what happened in the clearing than they did, and one of them suggests they forget about it. The host agrees, saying it is necessary to forget some things, and calls for the next course. Rudolf finds the missing seat next to the missing picnicker's wife; it had been pushed under the table.

Rudolf is unable to forget about the missing guest and asks the host if he can go looking for the man. He asks the host to order his men to go with him, but the host refuses to ask guests to leave in the middle of dinner. The host says it would be alright if the picnicker wearing glasses encourages people to go with Rudolf, however, so the picnicker gives a speech. He says everyone should go to bring back the man who left because the man left them all, not just the host.

While everyone is getting ready to leave, Rudolf thinks of using a dog to track the missing picnicker, an idea which excites the host, and the picnicker wearing glasses convinces the host that he and the other picnickers should stay behind in case their friend comes back. When they are alone, he asks the wife of the missing man why she did not leave with her husband. She replies that she just did not want to leave the celebration. The picnickers blow out the candles on the tables while the dog barks savagely in the background.

== Cast ==
- Ivan Vyskočil as Host
- Jan Klusák as Rudolf, the leader of the men who accost the picnickers and the host's newly adopted, adult son
- Jiří Němec as Josef, the picnicker wearing glasses
- Pavel Bošek as František, a picnicker
- Karel Mareš as Karel, the picnicker who most outspokenly questions Josef's antics
- Evald Schorm as Husband, the picnicker who leaves the party
- Jana Prachařová as Wife, the wife of the picnicker who leaves the party
- Zdena Škvorecká as Eva, the picnicker who suggests everyone forget about the interaction in the clearing
- Miloň Novotný as Groom
- Helena Pejsková as Marta, the picnicker who needs to go to the bathroom and finds the host
- Dana Němcová as Olinka, the bride
- Antonín Pražák as Antonín
- Josef Škvorecký as Guest
