= Škvorecký =

Škvorecký may refer to:

- Josef Škvorecký, (1924–2012), Czech writer
- 26314 Škvorecký, an asteroid
