= Ester Krumbachová =

Czech stage designer, author and screenwriter (1923–1996)

- Born: 12 November 1923; Brno, Czechoslovakia
- Died: 13 January 1996 (aged 72); Prague, Czech Republic
- Occupations: Screenwriter, Costume Designer
- Years active: 1961–1996
- Spouse(s): Slavíček Písařík Jan Němec (m. 1963–1968)

Ester Krumbachová (12 November 1923 – 13 January 1996) was a Czech screenwriter, costume designer, stage designer, author and director. She is known for her contributions to Czech New Wave cinema in the 1960s, including collaborations with directors Věra Chytilová and Jan Němec. Krumbachová would often act as both writer and art director on the films she worked on, such as Daisies and Fruit of Paradise. She directed one film in her lifetime, being The Murder of Mr. Devil, released in 1971. Krumbachová was largely banned from working in film during the 1980s by the communist party due to her involvement in A Report on the Party and the Guests.

In 2017, a private archive of Krumbachová's artwork, photography, documents, and clothes was made public by curators Edith Jeřábková and Zuzana Blochová. Krumbachová has since been the subject of retrospective exhibitions at TRANZITDISPLAY in Prague (2017), and the Centre for Contemporary Arts in Glasgow (2018).

== Early life ==
Ester Krumbachová was born in Brno, Czechoslovakia in 1923. In her youth, she lived through the Stalinist period of the Communist era which she avoided becoming politically involved in by working at farms and doing manual labor. Krumbachová went to school at the University of the Arts, where she studied in the arts and graphics branch. She went to college and, beginning in 1954, worked on local theater productions in České Budějovice, where she became both a costume designer and set designer, before moving to Prague in the early 1960s. She began to work in the film industry in 1961.

== Career ==
She began working in the film industry after a commission to work on the film, The Man from the First Century (1962).

She worked as a costume designer on the film Diamonds of the Night (1964), directed by her husband Jan Němec; this was her first collaboration with Němec. Her first addition to a script was on Zbyněk Brynych's Holocaust film The Fifth Horseman is Fear (1965). However, this credit is masked by her only being listed the film's costume designer. Her major script contribution was on the screenplay for Němec's A Report on the Party and the Guests (1966). Krumbachová would go on to be the script writer for Němec's following film, Martyrs of Love (1967). The film is based on a novella by Krumbachová. Eventually, she would be banned from film making because of her involvement with A Report on the Party and the Guests.

In 1966, she worked on Daisies as a costume designer and writer; this was her first screenplay with Věra Chytilová, a long time collaborator. She would work on two more films with Chytilová, Fruit of Paradise (1970) and Faunovo velmi pozdní odpoledne (1983).

Krumbachová's next collaboration with Němec was on the film Martyrs of Love (1967) which was described as being "less political in nature" than A Report on the Party and the Guests and more "arbitrary and obscure in its details." In 1968, after the Prague Spring she worked on Fruit of Paradise, an avant garde adaptation of the Adam and Eve story, with Chytilová. in 1969, Krumbachová began to write The Murder of Mr. Devil with Němec; this would be the only film she would direct. Finished in 1970, Krumbachová's sole directorial work had her in the role of script writer, art designer and costume designer. Veteran Czech filmmaker Otakar Vávra consulted Krumbachová on his 1970 film Witchhammer. She adapted Valerie and Her Week of Wonders from the novel of the same name with Czech director Jaromil Jireš in the same year.

During the 1980s, Krumbachová was banned by the communist regime. This arose due to her involvement in the film, A Report on the Party and the Guests. The film was controversial because of its depiction of authoritarian regimes, which the communist party were strongly against, leading to the film's banning and Krumbachová's blacklisting. She would occasionally find ways to work on films by working under a friend's name to avoid repercussions. This left Krumbachová to make and sell plastic jewelry and amulets for a living. She continued her artistic output through painting and writing. Her writing during this period ended up becoming a part of her book, The First Book of Ester (1994).

In 1983 she worked on two films, Faunovo velmi pozdní odpoledne which was her last colabortation with Chytilová, and Strata, a New Zealand film. Krumbachová published a book První knížka Ester (The First Book of Ester) in 1994.

After the communist party was dismantled due to Czechoslovakia's Velvet Revolution, Krumbachová was allowed back into the film industry and returned to work on features. At this point, she continued her career by working on a variety of projects, including a music video for Ivan Král, television documentaries, and her 1994 book. The final film she worked on was as the costume designer on Marian, by Petr Václav, which released in 1996, the same year Krumbachová passed.

== Legacy ==
Much of Krumbachová's work has been overlooked, despite her influence on the Czech New Wave.

In Jan Němec's film Late Talks with My Mother (2001), she appears as one of the people Němec talks to.

In 2005, Věra Chytilová directed the documentary In Search of Ester about Krumbachová's life and involvement in the Czech New Wave.

Krumbachová was the subject of the retrospective exhibition A Weakness for Raisins: Films and Archives of Ester Krumbachovà at the CCA: Centre for Contemporary Arts in Glasgow. The exhibition presented elements of Krumbachovà's personal archives to explore themes of "agency, magic, materialism, gender, feminism, the interconnected nature of reality, and sensory forms of knowledge." The exhibition also featured contemporary artists whose work has been influenced by Krumbachová, including ACID PRAWN (Sian Dorrer), Marek Meduna, Sally Hackett and France-Lise McGurn.

Peter Hames describes Krumbachová as one of the three big female directors produced from the Czech New Wave, alongside collaborators Věra Chytilová and Drahomíra Vihanová. Both Vihanová and Krumbachová had their filmmaking careers cut short due to the release of their debut features after the Russian invasion in 1968.

Krumbachová's impact on the Czech New Wave and Czechoslovak cinema has been described by Jan Žalman, saying, "she (Krumbachová) is the first to bring her gift of philosophical abstraction and Kafkaesque understanding of symbolism, which Max Brod called "the illumination of eternity by earthly means," to bear upon the somewhat limited world of Czech cinematic reality, making a spiritual breakthrough and bringing the new wave to the level of modern literature and drama.".

In 2026, an online archive of her work, Ester Krumbachová Archive, fully opened. The archive harbours scripts, notes, diaries, photos and unrealised projects relating to Krumbachová's career.

== Personal life and death ==
She was briefly married to architect Slavíček Písařík) before marrying Czech director Jan Němec in 1963; they divorced in 1968. Němec described her as his "muse".

Krumbachová died in 1996 in Prague.

== Filmography ==
As writer

- The Fifth Horseman is Fear (1965)
- Daisies (1966)
- A Report on the Party and the Guests (1966)
- Martyrs of Love (1967)
- Mother and Son (1967)
- Witchhammer (1970)
- Fruit of Paradise (1970)
- Killing the Devil (1970)
- Valerie and Her Week of Wonders (1970)
- Faunovo velmi pozdní odpoledne (1983)
- Strata (1983)

As costume designer

- Diamonds of the Night (1964)
- The Dear Departed (1964)
- If a Thousand Clarinets (1965)
- The Fifth Horseman is Fear (1965)
- Long Live the Republic (1965)
- Daisies (1966)
- A Report on the Party and the Guests (1966)
- Romance for Bugle (1967)
- Martyrs of Love (1967)
- Ta naše písnička česká (1967)
- The Nun's Night (1967)
- Pensión pro svobodné pány (1968)
- All My Compatriots (1969)
- Muž, ktery stoupl v ceně (1969)
- Ezop (1970)
- Fruit of Paradise (1970)
- Nevěsta (1970)
- Byli jednou dva písaři (1972)
- Straw Hat (1972)
- Tajemství velikeho vypravěče (1972)
- Poslední motýl (1991)

As director

- The Murder of Mr. Devil (1971)

== Bibliography ==
- První knížka Ester (The First Book of Ester) (1994) ISBN 9788085625363
