= Joseph Kilian =

- Directed by: Pavel Juráček; Jan Schmidt
- Written by: Pavel Juráček; Jan Schmidt
- Starring: Karel Vašíček
- Cinematography: Jan Čuřík
- Music by: Viliam Bukový
- Production company: Filmové studio Barrandov
- Distributed by: Ústřední půjčovna filmů
- Release date: 4 September 1964
- Running time: 38 minutes
- Country: Czechoslovakia
- Language: Czech

Joseph Kilian (Czech: Postava k podpírání), also known as Josef Kilián, is a 1963 short Czech drama film directed by Pavel Juráček and Jan Schmidt. It was released in 1964. The movie belongs to the Czech New Wave.

== Plot ==
Jan Herold is trying to find comrade Kilian, but no one ever heard of him. He wanders the streets of Prague when he suddenly sees a "Cat rental company". He decides to rent a cat and goes home. When he comes back the next day to return the cat, the company is gone and there's no evidence it ever existed. He then continues to search for the mysterious Killian. When he finally finds his office, it is empty. He goes to a pub and sees a man who looks a lot like Killian, but when he asks him, the man denies it and leaves in a hurry. Before losing him Jan can see the man is carrying a cat.

== Cast ==
- Karel Vašíček as Jan Herold
- Consuela Morávková as Saleswoman
- Ivan Růžička as Official
- Pavel Bártl as Kilian
- Jiří Stivín as Musician
- Pavel Šilhánek as Man with cresset

== Reception ==
The film was well received by international film critics. Many reviewers favourably compared the film to Kafka's work. Czechoslovak communist critics attacked the film on ideological basis.

== Release ==
The film premiered on 4 September 1964 in Czechoslovakia. First DVD release was by Second Run in 2013 on a disc with František Vláčil's The White Dove. The film was digitally restored in 4K by Czech Film Archive and re-released in cinemas on 3 March 2016. The restored version was released together with Case for a Rookie Hangman on DVD and Blu-ray on 26 April 2017.

== Awards ==
- Grand Prix at 1964 International Short Film Festival Oberhausen
- FIPRESCI Prize at 1964 Mannheim International Film Festival

== Bibliography ==
- Andrea Schnapková; Zdeněk Hudec (2017). Postava k podpírání. Praha: Casablanca.
- Hames, Peter (2010). Czech and Slovak Cinema. Edinburgh University Press. ISBN 978-0748620821.
- Škvorecký, Josef (1975). All the Bright Young Men and Women: A Personal History of the Czech Cinema. Toronto: Peter Martin Assoc. ISBN 9780887781100.
- Hames, Peter (2013). Introduction to Jonathan L. Owen's Avant-garde to New Wave (PDF). Berghahn Books.
