= Miroslav Macháček =

Czech theatre director and actor (1922–1991)

- Miroslav Macháček
- Born: 8 May 1922; Nymburk, Czechoslovakia
- Died: 17 February 1991 (aged 68); Prague, Czechoslovakia
- Occupation: Actor
- Years active: 1958–1990

Miroslav Macháček (May 8, 1922 – February 17, 1991) was a Czech theatre director and actor.

== Life and career ==
Macháček was born in Nymburk. His father was a car painter and a custodian of (and sometimes actor and director in) the theater in Nymburk, where young Miroslav met many famous Czech actors who were guests of the theater. His father enrolled Miroslav in high school, but he was expelled after a few years and had to return to elementary school. After graduation, he went to a trade school where he learned to become a hammerman in the Aero factory. During his studies he took part in evening theater rehearsals in Prague, and met famous actors such as Jiří Sovák, Martin Růžek, and Václav Voska.

He decided to enroll in a theatrical college. He passed the admission exam, but at that time, institutions of higher education in the Protectorate of Bohemia and Moravia were being closing down. He entered the school after the war (Miloš Nedbal was his teacher) and graduated in 1948. At the time of his studies he was so poor that he had to sleep in the college building (Rudolfinum) but later he lived with his colleagues (e.g. Stanislav Remunda).

After graduation, he worked in the Pardubice Theater. In 1950 he moved to Prague and started working for Realist Theater and DAMU (Theater Conservatory). A year later he was accused of revolting and having spy contacts and was fired from the theater as well as from the college. He had to write an obligatory public confession. As a consequence he suffered from depression, and even tried to commit suicide, but eventually left Prague for České Budějovice to work in the local theater. In 1956 (at the time of the 20th Congress of the Communist Party of the Soviet Union) he returned to Prague, and in 1959 he started his career in the most prestigious theater in the country – the National Theater. He was a constituent member of the Činoherní klub (1965).

In April 1969 he left the Communist Party of Czechoslovakia. The secret police constantly harassed him and interrupted his professional work as a theater director and an actor. With others in the National Theater he successfully staged Shakespeare's Henry V; his success was remarkable because the audience rightfully understood this play was making fun of communists. He directed what the authorities claimed to be an anti-communist play/translation by Břetislav Hodek and was accused of disrespect for the Communist Party and the government of Czechoslovakia. As punishment he had to stop working for Czech Television and was no longer allowed to work on movies. Nonetheless he managed to successfully stage 29 plays by different authors. He also acted in over thirty roles, often in dramas he directed. In 1975 he made a speech in the National Theater that was critical of the government (after the opening night of the Optimistic Tragedy by Vsevolod Vishnevskiy) and as a result he was forced by the authorities to begin treatment in the psychiatric asylum in Bohnice, where he spent 117 days.

After his dismissal from the asylum he came back to the National Theater and directed most of his masterpieces, among them Naši Furianti by Ladislav Stroupežnický. The play, which opened on 13 May 1979, is often considered one of the best stagings of a play in post-war Czechoslovak history. He retired on 1 January 1989 but he took active part in the Velvet Revolution.

Macháček was married to Věra Štiborová in 1949. Their daughter is the actress Kateřina Macháčková. They divorced after he met Ester Krumbachová, an actress, in České Budějovice. Macháček and Krumbachová parted in the early 1960s and Macháček started a relationship with Jana Břežková. His daughter Kateřina Macháčková edited her father's notes from the hospital under the title Notes from a Madhouse (Zápisky z blázince, 1995). Her own 300-page biographical book about her father will come out in 2009.

== Film ==
Macháček appeared in several Czech films:

- Ďáblova past (František Vláčil 1961)
- Valley of the Bees (1967)
- Love Between the Raindrops (1979)
- Stín kapradiny (František Vláčil, 1984)
- Skalpel, prosím (Jiří Svoboda, 1985).
- Wolf's Hole (1987)
