= Pavel Juráček =

Czech film director (1935–1989)

- Born: 2 August 1935; Příbram, Czechoslovakia
- Died: 20 May 1989 (aged 53); Prague, Czechoslovakia
- Occupations: Screenwriter and director
- Years active: 1961–1970
- Spouse: Daňa Horáková (m. 1979)

Pavel Juráček (Czech: [ˈpavɛl ˈjuraːtʃɛk]; 2 August 1935 – 20 May 1989) was a Czech screenwriter and film director who studied at FAMU. Juráček started as a screenwriter for many Czech New Wave movies until he became a director. He worked in Prague at the Barrandov film studios; however after his satirical movie Case for a Rookie Hangman (1970) was shelved, he was fired from Barrandov and wasn't allowed to make movies anymore.

== Education ==
Juráček studied alongside filmmakers like Věra Chytilová, director of Sedmikrásky (Daisies), while studying at FAMU. He assisted in revising Chytilová's script in order to gain approval from their professor, although she inevitably filmed her original script in defiance.

== Filmography ==
=== Director ===
- Joseph Kilian (1963) – co-directed with Jan Schmidt; Grand Prize at ISFF Oberhausen, FIPRESCI Prize at IFF Mannheim
- Every Young Man (1965)
- Case for a Rookie Hangman (1970)

=== Screenwriter only ===
- Black and White Sylva (1961) – directed by Jan Schmidt
- Ceiling (1962) – directed by Věra Chytilová
- Keeper of Dynamite (1963) – directed by Zdeněk Sirový
- Voyage to the End of the Universe (1963) – directed by Jindřich Polák
- A Jester's Tale (Bláznova kronika) (1964) – directed by Karel Zeman
- Nobody Will Laugh (1966) – directed by Hynek Bočan
- Daisies (1966) – directed by Věra Chytilová
- Late August at the Hotel Ozone (1967) – directed by Jan Schmidt
- Kinoautomat (1967) – directed by Radúz Činčera
