= Valerie and Her Week of Wonders =

1945 novel by Czech writer Vítězslav Nezval

- First edition (Czech)
- Author: Vítězslav Nezval
- Original title: Valerie A Týden Divů
- Illustrator: Kamil Lhotak
- Language: Czech
- Genre: Surrealist Fiction; Gothic Horror; Dark Fantasy
- Published: 1945 (original); 2005 (English translation)
- Publisher: F. J. Müller
- Publication place: Czechoslovakia
- Media type: Print (Paperback)
- Pages: 168
- ISBN: 978-80-86264-19-6

Valerie and Her Week of Wonders (Czech: Valerie A Týden Divů) is a novel by Vítězslav Nezval, written in 1935 and first published in 1945. The novel was written before Nezval's dramatic shift to Socialist Realism. It was made into a 1970 Czech film directed by Jaromil Jireš, a prominent example of Czech New Wave cinema.

With this novel, Nezval explored the gothic themes and settings of such novels as Mary Shelley's Frankenstein (1818) and M. G. Lewis' The Monk (1796), as well as F. W. Murnau's film Nosferatu (1922; based on 1897 novel Dracula by Bram Stoker).

The 2005 English edition features the illustrations by Kamil Lhoták that appeared in the original edition.

== Adaptation ==
The 1970 film adaptation Valerie and Her Week of Wonders, directed by Jaromil Jireš, with Jaroslava Schallerová as Valerie.
