= Fruit of Paradise =

1970 film

- DVD cover
- Directed by: Věra Chytilová
- Written by: Věra Chytilová; Ester Krumbachová
- Produced by: Bronka Ricquier
- Starring: Karel Novák
- Cinematography: Jaroslav Kučera
- Edited by: Miroslav Hájek
- Music by: Zdeněk Liška
- Release date: 31 July 1970
- Running time: 99 minutes
- Country: Czechoslovakia
- Language: Czech

Fruit of Paradise (Czech: Ovoce stromů rajských jíme) is a 1970 Czechoslovak avant-garde drama film directed by Věra Chytilová. It was entered into the 1970 Cannes Film Festival. The film is an adaptation of the Adam and Eve story. This was Chytilová's last film before she was placed on an eight-year ban by the Czechoslovak Government. Fellow Czech screenwriter and costume designer Ester Krumbachová collaborated with Chytilová on the screenplay, costumes, and decor.

== Plot ==
Eva (Jitka Nováková) spends the holidays with her husband, Josef (Karel Novák), in a luxurious mansion. Picking berries, playing with balloons and running through the woods. When Robert (Jan Schmid) crosses his path and drops a key.

She follows him to return the object, finding a bag in his quarters. This one contains a stamp with the number 6, which she uses on her own skin. It turns out that Robert is a serial killer and Eva is in love with him.

After chasing him, demanding that he kill her, Eva is covered in red cloths and when Robert removes these, her clothes are also red. Upon returning to "Paradise", where she lived with Josef, Eva is unable to climb over the walls, even though they are low, and tells her husband that she "doesn't want to know the truth".

== Cast ==
- Karel Novák as Josef
- Jitka Nováková as Eva
- Jan Schmid as Robert
- Julius Albert as Starý pán (uncredited)
- Alice Auspergerová as Teta (uncredited)
- Jan Klusák as Robert (voice) (uncredited)
- Luděk Sobota as Muž s kyticí (uncredited)
- Josef Somr as Josef (voice) (uncredited)
- Jaromír Vomáčka as Strýc (uncredited)
