= Talíře nad Velkým Malíkovem =

Talíře nad Velkým Malíkovem is a 1977 Czechoslovak science fiction comedy film directed by Jaromil Jireš. The film starred Josef Kemr.

== Cast ==
- Vlastimil Brodský as Road-mender Frantisek Huba
- Jan Tríska as Mine carpenter Salánek
- Iva Janzurová as Viola Zlatnícková
- Míla Myslíková as Zmatlíková
- Josef Vetrovec as Lojza Hrubec
- Jirí Hálek as Innholder Tonda Cink
