= Miss Silver's Past =

1969 novel by Josef Škvorecký

- Cover of the first Czech edition, with illustration by Karel Laštovka
- Author: Josef Škvorecký
- Original title: Lvíče
- Translator: Peter Kussi
- Cover artist: Karel Laštovka
- Language: Czech
- Genre: Satire, Detective fiction
- Set in: Prague, early/mid 1960s
- Publisher: Československý spisovatel
- Publication date: 1969
- Publication place: Czechoslovak Socialist Republic
- English publication date: 1974
- Media type: Print: hardback
- Pages: 268
- Dewey Decimal: 891.86
- LC Class: PG5038 .S527

Miss Silver's Past (Czech: Lvíče, "Lion Cub") is a 1969 novel by Czech author Josef Škvorecký.

Written between 1963 and 1967 (prior to the Prague Spring), it was published after it.

== Plot ==
Karel Leden works at a publisher's in Communist Czechoslovakia. He meets Lenka Silver, a Jewish woman with a mysterious past.

== Reception ==
Gleb Žekulin wrote that Lvíče "confirmed [Škvorecký] as the leading Czech prose writer of the post-Stalin era." Mavis Gallant also admired Miss Silver's Past.

Kirkus Reviews was scathing, saying "even the apparatchiks' wrangles over how and whether to publish a blockbuster novel are only mechanically amusing. And, in Czech fashion, the byplay of seduction is used to underline the camaraderie of the seducers while the women remain objects, and nothing human ever takes place. Škvorecký's style is trite and trivial."

== Adaptation ==
The film was adapted for Czechoslovak television in 1969, under the title Flirt se slečnou Stříbrnou ("Flirting with Miss Stříbrná").
