= Late August at the Hotel Ozone =

- Theatrical release poster
- Directed by: Jan Schmidt
- Screenplay by: Pavel Juráček; Jan Schmidt
- Story by: Pavel Juráček
- Starring: Ondrej Jariabek; Beta Poničanová
- Cinematography: Jiří Macák
- Edited by: Miroslav Hájek
- Music by: Jan Klusák
- Production company: Československý armádní film
- Distributed by: Ústřední půjčovna filmů
- Release date: April 28, 1967
- Running time: 77 minutes
- Country: Czechoslovakia
- Language: Czech

Late August at the Hotel Ozone (Czech: Konec srpna v Hotelu Ozon) is a 1967 Czechoslovak postapocalyptic science fiction film by director Jan Schmidt based on a screenplay by Pavel Juráček.

== Plot ==
The film follows the journey of a group of young women, children of the survivors in a post-apocalyptic world after a nuclear war, led by an old woman, Dagmar Hubertusová, in a search of survived men, for women to bear children and repopulate the planet. They find only one man, Hubert, who is too old to have children. Dagmar dies, of exhaustion and lost hopes, the women kill Hubert (because he is useless and refuses to give them his old grammophone) and hit the road again.

== Cast ==
- Ondrej Jariabek as Hubert
- Beta Poničanová as Dagmar Hubertusová
- Magda Seidlerová as Barbora
- Hana Vítková as Tereza
- Jana Novaková as Klára
- Vanda Kalinová as Judita
- Natalie Maslovová as Magdaléna
- Irena Lžičařová as Eva
- Jitka Hořejšías Marta

== Production ==
Dana Medřická was originally considered for a role of Dagmar Hubertusová. The film was shot in an abandoned village near Mohelno.

== Reception ==
Late August at the Hotel Ozone was released in 1967. The New York Times wrote in 2014 "Gorgeously shot and devastatingly well told, the film echoes the hopelessness of certain World War II narratives of the era".

== See also ==
- List of apocalyptic films
- List of nuclear holocaust fiction
