= Křeček v noční košili =

- Starring: Július Satinský, Ondřej Regazzo, Jiří Racek, Marek Brodský
- Countries of origin: Czechoslovakia; West Germany
- Original language: Czech
- No. of episodes: 6

Production
- Running time: 45 minutes

Original release
- Network: Czechoslovak Television
- Release: 24 December 1988 – 1 January 1989

Křeček v noční košili (Hamster in a Nightshirt) is a six-part television series for children, which was co-produced by Czechoslovakia and West Germany in 1987 by director Václav Vorlíček. It was first broadcast during the Christmas holidays of 1988. In Germany it is known under title Hamster im Nachthemd. The hamster in the title refers to a character whose surname translates as hamster.

== Plot ==
The main character is young Kája Berka, who visits his grandparents in the town of Ružbach. There he sleeps in a borrowed nightgown from his great-grandfather - and thanks to it, he is transported in his dream to the time when his great-grandfather taught at the local school and shocked the neighborhood with his ingenious inventions. However, in an attempt to transfer his inventions to modern times, engineer Křeček appropriates these inventions (among other things because he was competing with Kája's father for the position of chief designer of the automobile company). The Kreček family basks in the media's favor, while the Berks are embarrassed - so Kája and his friend Aleš Chvojka, using another of his great-grandfather's inventions, get into the thief's head and begin to influence and control him in an attempt to seek justice.

== Cast ==
- Ondřej Regazzo as student Kája Berka
- Jiří Racek as student Aleš Chvojka
- Marek Brodský as designer Radim Berka, Kája's older brother
- Jiří Zahajský as engineer Berka, Kája's and Radim's father
- Božidara Turzonovová as Magda Berková, Kája's a Radim's mother
- Miroslav Vladyka as great-grandfather Berka, Lyceum professor and inventor
- Marie Rosůlková as great-grandmother Berková
- Jarmila Smejkalová as grandmother Berková
- Jiří Sovák as grandfather Berka
- Július Satinský as engineer Karel Křeček
- Jana Švandová as Mrs. Křečková
- Monika Effenbergerová as Alice Křečková, daughter of Karel Křeček and Radim's love interest
- Martin Mejzlík as Tomáš Křeček, Radim's rival
- Ondřej Vetchý as Michal, Radim's friend
- Zdena Hadrbolcová as Mrs. Chvojková, Aleš' mother
- Luděk Kopřiva as headmaster of Lyceum
- Karel Effa as janitor of lyceum
- Václav Sloup as repairman Zedral
- Alena Procházková as Kája's and Aleš' teacher
- Jaroslava Schallerová as Klára

== Episodes ==
1. Ukradený vynález (Stolen invention)
2. Sehnat noční košili (Quest for a nightshirt)
3. Velká akce začíná (The big action begins)
4. V pasti (The trap)
5. Zloděj v noční košili (Thief in a nightshirt)
6. Vlaštovko, leť! (Fly, paper plane!)
