= Dimensions of Dialogue =

- Directed by: Jan Švankmajer
- Written by: Jan Švankmajer
- Cinematography: Vladimír Malík
- Edited by: Helena Lebdušková
- Music by: Jan Klusák
- Distributed by: Krátký Film Praha
- Release date: January 25, 1983
- Running time: 12 minutes
- Country: Czechoslovakia

Dimensions of Dialogue (Czech: Možnosti dialogu, lit.: Possibilities of Dialogue) is a 1983 Czechoslovak animated short film directed by Jan Švankmajer. It is 12 minutes long and created with stop motion.

== Plot ==
The animation is divided into three sections. Objective Dialogue (Dialog věcný) shows Arcimboldo-like heads gradually reducing each other to bland copies; Passionate Dialogue (Dialog vášnivý) shows a clay man and woman who dissolve into one another sexually, then quarrel and reduce themselves to a frenzied, boiling pulp; and Exhaustive Dialogue (Dialog vyčerpávající) consists of two elderly clay heads who extrude various objects on their tongues (toothbrush and toothpaste; shoe and shoelaces, etc.) and intertwine them in various combinations.

== Reception ==
Terry Gilliam selected the film as one of the ten best animated films of all time.

== Awards ==
- Annecy International Animated Film Festival 1983 – Won Grand Prix
- Berlin International Film Festival 1983 – Won Golden Bear for Best Short Film, C.I.D.A.L.C. Award (Honorable Mention)
