= Opera ve vinici =

Opera ve vinici is a 1981 Czechoslovak drama film directed by Jaromil Jireš. The film starred actor Josef Kemr.
