= Fern Knight =

American psychedelic folk band

- Origin: Providence, Rhode Island, United States
- Genres: folk, psychedelic, rock
- Years active: 1999–present
- Labels: Normal, VHF Records
- Members: Margaret Ayre, Jim Ayre, Jesse Sparhawk, James Wolf

Fern Knight is an American psychedelic folk band currently based in Washington, D.C. Formed in 1999 by Margaret Ayre (née Wienk), the group performs music inspired by the spooky, pastoral sounds of classic British acts like Pentangle and Steeleye Span. Their music has been referred to as "a delightfully creepy homage to the Celtic-Appalachian tradition."

== History ==
Ayre formed Fern Knight in Providence, Rhode Island, releasing the band's first album, Seven Years of Severed Limbs, on the Normal label in 2003. After relocating to Philadelphia, Fern Knight fell in with the city's burgeoning psychedelic folk scene, playing alongside bands like Espers. In 2006 - 2008, Fern Knight collaborated with members of Espers on The Valerie Project, an alternate soundtrack to the Czechoslovak cult film Valerie and Her Week of Wonders.

Fern Knight's most recent album, Solstice, was released in 2019.

== Discography ==
=== Albums ===
- Seven Years of Severed Limbs (2003)
- Blithewold EP (2005)
- Music for Witches and Alchemists (2006)
- Fern Knight (2008)
- Castings (2010)
- Solstice (2019)
