= Wolf's Hole =

1987 film

- Directed by: Věra Chytilová
- Written by: Věra Chytilová; Daniela Fischerová
- Starring: Miroslav Machácek
- Cinematography: Jaromír Sofr
- Edited by: Jiří Brožek
- Release date: 2 June 1986
- Running time: 92 minutes
- Country: Czechoslovakia
- Language: Czech

Wolf's Hole (Czech: Vlčí bouda) is a 1986 Czechoslovak science fiction horror film directed by Věra Chytilová. It was entered into the 37th Berlin International Film Festival. The film can be characterized as moralizing horror, but may also be interpreted as an allegory for the atmosphere surrounding the normalization period.

== Plot ==
A group of teenagers are invited to a skiing workshop in the mountains, without being told how or why they were picked as participants. There are eleven of them, but the camp supervisors insist that there should be only ten, and that one of them is an intruder. As the group find themselves cut off from the outside world, strange things begin to happen; the supervisors seem intent to create an atmosphere of hostility, turning the participants against each other, even urging them to kill each other. The supervisors eventually reveal themselves as extraterrestrials who demand that the group pick one among them to be sacrificed. They refuse, however, and in a panic set the cottage on fire and make a narrow escape on a lift used for timber transport, leaving no man behind.

== Cast ==
- Miroslav Macháček as Daddy
- Tomás Palatý as Dingo
- Stepánka Cervenková as Babeta
- Jan Bidlas as Honza
- Rita Dudusová as Gitka
- Irena Mrozková as Linda
- Hana Mrozkovy as Lenka
- Norbert Pycha as Marcipan
- Simona Racková as Gaba
- Roman Fiser as Jozka
- Frantisek Stanek as Petr
- Radka Slavíková as Emilka
- Jitka Zelenková as Brona
- Petr Horacek as Alan

== Awards and nominations ==
The film was nominated for the Golden Bear for Best Film at the 1987 Berlin Film Festival.
