= Zdena Salivarová =

Czech translator and writer (1933–2025)

Zdena Salivarová (October 21, 1933 – August 25, 2025) was a Czech-born writer and translator who lived in Toronto, Canada. She founded a publishing house which published Czech works that had been banned in the Czechoslovak Socialist Republic.

== Early life ==
Salivarová was born in Prague on October 21, 1933. Her father was a book-seller and publisher who was arrested by the Czech government. He and her brother both were given jail sentences.

She attended the Eliska Krasnohorska Girls' Real Gymnasium in Prague and graduated in 1952. She wished to enter the conservatory as a violinist but was unable to apply because her father and brother had been termed political prisoners.

She studied script-writing at the Academy of Performing Arts in Prague. During the 1960s, Salivarová worked as a singer and actress. In 1968, she published a collection of short stories Pánská jízda.

== Life in exile ==
Following the Soviet invasion of Czechoslovakia in August 1968, Salivarová emigrated with her husband Josef Škvorecký, firstly to the United States and then to Canada. They settled in Toronto in 1969.

Salivarová founded a Czech émigré publishing house in Toronto, 68 Publishers, which published Czech books that were banned in the Czechoslovak Socialist Republic for over 20 years. This included works by Václav Havel, Milan Kundera, and Ludvík Vaculík and others. Salivarová and her husband wrote Samožerbuch (1977) about the history of the publishing house. The publishing house closed in 1993; with the Velvet Revolution in Czechoslovakia a publisher of banned books in Czech was no longer needed. At its closure, 68 Publishers had published 227 books.

She received the Egon Hostovský Award in 1976. With her husband, she was named to the Order of the White Lion in 1990 for their work in promoting Czech literature.

Salivarová died on August 25, 2025, in Toronto, at the age of 91.

== Selected works ==
- Honzlová. Toronto: Nakl. 68. 1972. OCLC 15772487. OL 25200362M. (in Czech)
  - Translation: Summer in Prague. New York: Harper & Row. 1973. OL 18533758M.
- Nebe, peklo, ráj. Toronto: Sixty-Eight Publishers. 1976. LCCN 77505107. OCLC 234176971. OL 4654582M. (in Czech)
  - Translation: Ashes, ashes, all fall down. Toronto, On: Larkwood Books. 1987. ISBN 0-88781-188-4. LCCN 88101736. OCLC 18559906. OL 2072223M.

== Filmography ==
- 1969: End of a Priest – Anna
- 1967: Mučedníci lásky
- 1966: A Report on the Party and the Guests
