= The Young Man and Moby Dick =

1979 Czechoslovak drama film

- Directed by: Jaromil Jireš
- Written by: Mária Dufková-Rudlovcáková; Jaromil Jireš
- Starring: Ivan Vyskocil
- Cinematography: Emil Sirotek
- Release date: August 1979
- Running time: 89 minutes
- Country: Czechoslovakia
- Language: Czech

The Young Man and Moby Dick (Czech: Mladý muž a bílá velryba) is a 1979 Czechoslovak drama film directed by Jaromil Jireš. It was entered into the 11th Moscow International Film Festival.

== Cast ==
- Ivan Vyskočil as Bretislav Laboutka
- Eduard Cupák as Viktor Panc
- Jana Brejchová as Edita Beningerová
- Zlata Adamovská as Nada
- Jana Andresíková as Worker
- Zdeněk Blažek as Ferryman Gauss
- Bohuslav Čáp as Worker
- Karel Heřmánek as Udo Vízner
