= Scalpel, Please =

1985 film

- Directed by: Jiří Svoboda
- Written by: Valja Stýblová; Jiří Svoboda
- Starring: Miroslav Macháček
- Cinematography: Vladimír Smutný
- Release date: July 1985
- Running time: 114 minutes
- Country: Czechoslovakia
- Language: Czech

Scalpel, Please (Czech: Skalpel, prosím) is a 1985 Czech psychological drama film directed by Jiří Svoboda. It was entered into the 14th Moscow International Film Festival. The film was selected as the Czechoslovakia entry for the Best Foreign Language Film at the 58th Academy Awards, but was not accepted as a nominee.

== Cast ==
- Miroslav Macháček as Professor
- Jana Brejchová as Jitka
- Radoslav Brzobohatý as Krtek
- Barbara Brylska as Med. assistant
- Marie Durnová as Zita
- Jana Krausová as Helena
- Jakub Zdenek as Uzlik

== See also ==
- List of submissions to the 58th Academy Awards for Best Foreign Language Film
- List of Czechoslovak submissions for the Academy Award for Best Foreign Language Film
