= The Cowards =

Novel by Josef Škvorecký

- First edition cover
- Author: Josef Škvorecký
- Original title: Zbabělci
- Translator: Victor Gollancz
- Language: Czech
- Set in: Czechoslovak Socialist Republic
- Publisher: Grove Press, 68 Publishers
- Publication date: 1958
- Publication place: Czechoslovak Socialist Republic, Canada
- Media type: Print
- Pages: 418 pp
- OCLC: 45347424

The Cowards (originally Zbabělci) is a Czech novel by Josef Škvorecký. Written in 1948–49 but not published until 1958, it is a story from the very end of the Second World War in Europe. Narrated in the first person by a Czech at the end of his teens, Danny Smiřický, it takes place in the week 4–11 May 1945 in his home town, a fictional town called Kostelec in northeast Bohemia, close to the frontier with then-German Middle Silesia (now part of Poland).

Škvorecký's prose is mostly narrative and immediate. This is interspersed with introspective passages in which Danny thinks in long sentences of many clauses representing the movement of his mind from one related thought to another.

== Plot ==
Škvorecký modelled Kostelec on his own home town of Náchod, and Smiřický is a semi-autobiographical character based on the author. Like Náchod, Kostelec is a border town on a river and overlooked by a castle. Like Škvorecký, Smiřický is the educated, middle-class son of a bank clerk, loves jazz music and has spent two years as a forced labourer in a Messerschmitt aircraft factory. Danny belongs to a jazz and swing band of middle-class young men that plays in a local café and tries to impress the local girls. But everyone knows that Danny's love for the beautiful Irena is unrequited, and instead she loves Zdeněk who shares her enthusiasm for mountaineering.

The novel opens with Kostelec still under German occupation, and ends a week later after the Red Army has liberated the town. The town's German garrison plans to retreat west in the hope of surrendering to the US Army rather than the Soviets. Kostelec's Czech civic authorities, who had cooperated (and in some cases possibly collaborated) with the German Protectorate of Bohemia and Moravia authorities, want to keep the town calm and avoid bloodshed. They fear that local Czechoslovak Communist (KSČ) partisans are planning a revolution not only against the retreating Germans but also to prevent restoration of the pre-war capitalist order. The local elite thus organize "revolutionary troops" only to disarm Czech population and keep the young men under control. Groups of disarmed youngsters are sent to patrol and to prevent the communist resistance from raiding the German ammunition train. Danny and his friends have lost the illusions and deserted.

In the following days the liberated POWs and prisoners from concentration camps are streaming through the town. Danny helps them to find the food and shelter and he finally feels useful.

On 9 May, troops of Waffen-SS refuse to respect the Unconditional surrender. Their tank and infantry units are fighting a rearguard action against a Soviet forces and are approaching the town. The communist resistance takes over the command of "revolutionary troops" gives them guns and sends them against Germans. In the ensuing fight Danny kills one SS-man and incapacitates one German tank but he gives a false name to the Soviet commander as he doesn't want to be misused by propaganda as the "hero".

== Anti-hero Danny ==
Local young men including Danny and his fellow-musicians have a wry and cynical view of the older generation who run the town and try to organise an orderly and peaceful transition throughout the departure of the German garrison and arrival of the Soviets. Danny is motivated not by patriotism or politics but to impress Irena and win her from Zdeněk. As the turmoil of the final days of the war in Europe envelop Kostelec, events cause Danny to confront existential questions of his life, its purpose, and his future if he survives the dangerous final phase of the war.

== Publication and reactions ==
Škvorecký started the novel a few months after the 1948 Czechoslovak coup d'état created the Czechoslovak Socialist Republic (ČSSR) and completed it in September 1949. It portrayed KSČ partisans favourably and was unfavourable to the democrats they had deposed, but as a result of continuing Stalinism in the ČSSR the novel went unpublished until 1958, when it appeared both in Prague and in an English translation by Victor Gollancz in London. Even then, ČSSR President Antonín Novotný and the KSČ Central Committee accused Škvorecký of "defamation of anti-fascist resistance and denigration of the Red Army", copies were withdrawn from sale and destroyed, and the author was dismissed from his post as editor of the magazine Světová literatura ("World Literature").

The novel survived and was republished in Czechoslovakia in 1964, 1966 and in the Prague Spring of 1968. When this ended in the Warsaw Pact invasion of Czechoslovakia, Škvorecký and his wife fled to Canada. The Cowards was published in English by in the USA by Grove Press in 1970 and in Canada by Škvorecký's own 68 Publishers in 1972.

== Attempts at adaptation ==
In the spring and summer of 1968 Škvorecký and the Czech film director Miloš Forman jointly wrote a script synopsis to make a film version of The Cowards. After Škvorecký fled the Warsaw Pact invasion the synopsis was translated into English, but no film was made. The original Czech synopsis was lost, but in the 21st century the English translation was translated back into Czech and has been published.

In the 1990s the screenwriter Petr Jarchovský wrote a screenplay, and the directors Jiří Menzel and Vladimír Michálek considered filming it. The director Bohdan Sláma also had an unrealised project to turn the novel into a film.
