= The Valerie Project =

Former psychedelic folk band

- Origin: Philadelphia
- Genres: Psychedelic folk
- Years active: 2006-present
- Label: Drag City
- Members: Greg Weeks, Brooke Sietinsons, Helena Espvall, Margaret Wienk, Jesse Sparhawk, Jim Ayre, Tara Burke, Mary Lattimore, Jessica Weeks, Charles Cohen
- Website: http://www.myspace.com/thevalerieproject

The Valerie Project was a Philadelphia-based psychedelic folk band. Their first (self-titled) album, released in 2007, is intended to serve as an alternate soundtrack to the cult Czech New Wave film Valerie and Her Week of Wonders. They have performed live at screenings of the film. The band is led by Espers member Greg Weeks and also includes Brooke Sietinsons and Helena Espvall of Espers, Margaret Wienk, Jesse Sparhawk, and Jim Ayre of Fern Knight, Tara Burke (aka Fursaxa), Mary Lattimore, Jessica Weeks (wife of Greg), and Charles Cohen.

The band performed live from 2006-2008, accompanying screenings of the film at the Museum of Modern Art in New York, at London's Meltdown festival, and elsewhere. Their debut album, recorded in eight days and released on Drag City, received positive reviews in The Independent, Pitchfork, Foxy Digitalis, and XLR8R, as well as a more mixed review in The Guardian.
