= Jan Hus (2015 film) =

Czech historical television film

- Film cover
- Written by: Eva Kantůrková, Jiří Svoboda
- Directed by: Jiří Svoboda
- Starring: Matěj Hádek, Milan Kňažko, Jan Dolanský
- Music by: Michael Kocáb
- Country of origin: Czech Republic
- Original language: Czech

Production
- Running time: 240 minutes 144 minutes (DC)
- Production company: Czech Television
- Budget: 45 Million CZK

Original release
- Release: 2015

Jan Hus is a 2015 Czech historical television film directed by Jiří Svoboda. It is based on the life of Jan Hus. It consists of three parts. Jan Hus is one of the most expensive projects of Czech Television.

== Plot ==
The film starts when Czech king Wenceslaus IV is imprisoned by his brother Sigismund. Sigismund's troops pillage Bohemian territory. Jan Hus criticises the new order during his sermons. He also starts to criticise conditions in the Church which earns him hatred from other priests. Pope imposes Prague to an Interdict and Hus has to leave Prague. He is not safe in his hometown Husinec but Jidnřich Lefl offers him hideout. Hus is invited to Kostnice to defend his teachings. He agrees but is arrested on his way. He is executed on 6 June 1415.

== Cast ==
- Matěj Hádek as Jan Hus
- Milan Kňažko as Dominikán
- Jan Dolanský as Štěpán Paleč
- Vladimír Javorský as Wenceslaus IV of Bohemia
- Michal Dlouhý as Sigismund of Luxemburg
- Jan Plouhar as Jeroným Pražský
- Marika Šoposká as Sophia of Bavaria

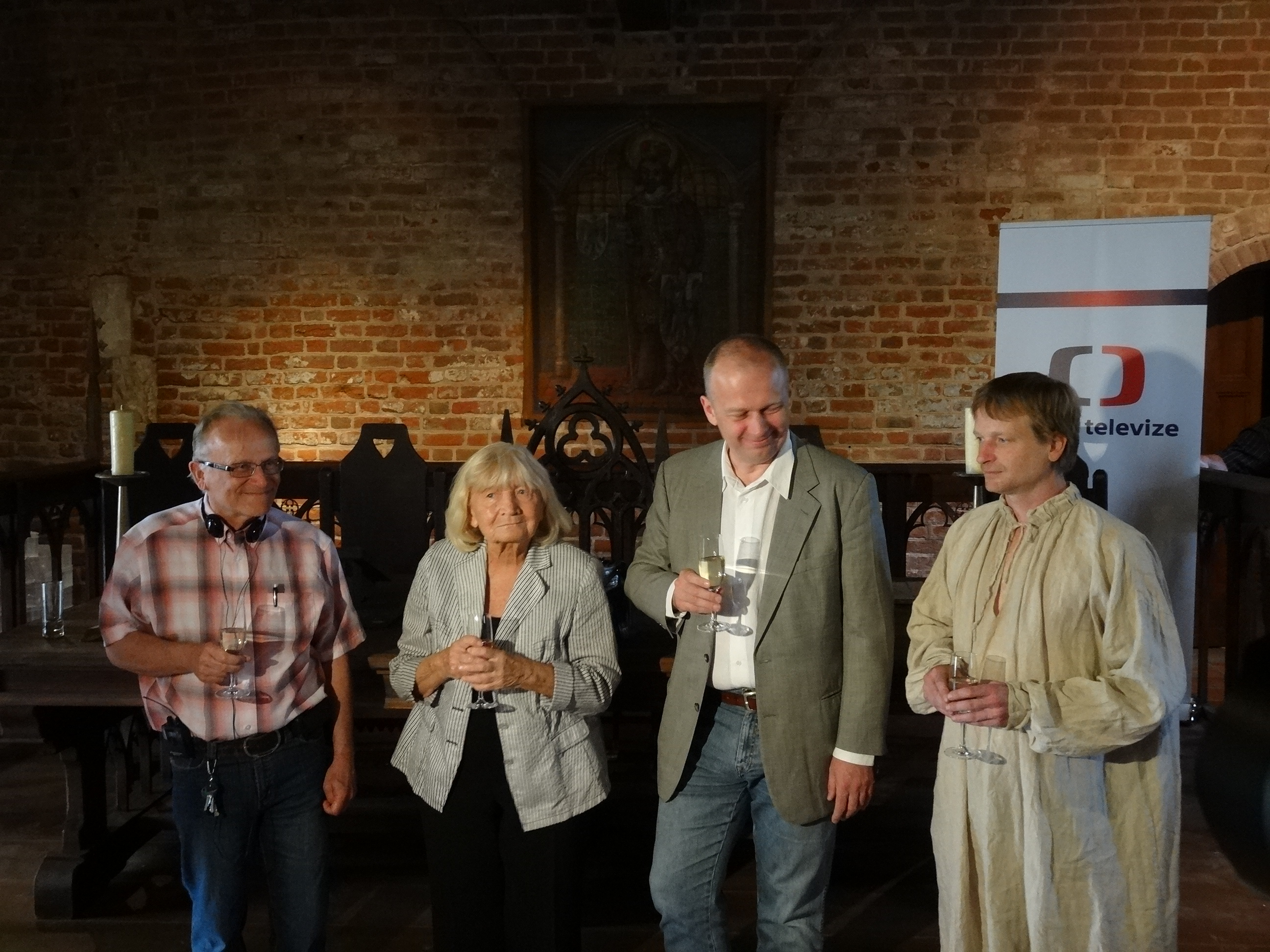
Main creators along with Matěj Hádek

== Shooting ==
Shooting started in June 2014. It took place on 20 locations in the Czech Republic using approximately 2,000 extras. Shooting finished on 24 February 2015.

== Reception ==
The film received mixed reviews.

Historian Martin Vaňáč criticised the film for numerous historical inaccuracies.
