= Vracenky =

Vracenky is a Czech comedy film directed by Jan Schmidt. It was released in 1990.
