= The Jester and the Queen =

- Directed by: Věra Chytilová
- Starring: Bolek Polívka, Chantal Poullain, Jiří Kodet, Jiří Pecha, Vlastimil Brodský
- Edited by: Jiří Brožek
- Release date: 1987
- Running time: 112 mins
- Country: Czechoslovakia
- Language: Czech

The Jester and the Queen (Czech: Šašek a královna) is a 1987 Czechoslovak comedy film directed by Věra Chytilová.
