= 68 Publishers =

Canadian publisher

- Founded: 1971; 54 years ago
- Founders: Josef Škvorecký; Zdena Salivarová
- Country of origin: Canada
- Headquarters location: Toronto, Ontario

68 Publishers, also called Sixty-Eight Publishers, Sixtyeight Publishers, in Czech Nakladatelství 68 ('nakladatelství' is Czech for 'publishing house'), was a publishing house formed in Toronto, Ontario, Canada, in 1971 by Czech expatriate Josef Škvorecký and his wife Zdena Salivarová. The purpose of 68 Publishers was to publish books by Czech and Slovak writers whose works were banned in communist Czechoslovakia. The name '68 Publishers' is in commemoration of the Prague Spring of 1968.

Škvorecký and Salivarová began by publishing both Czech originals, and English translations, of Škvorecký's books. The first book, Tankový prapor (The Republic of Whores) was published in 1971 and was followed by others such as Prima sezóna (The Swell Season), Zbabělci (The Cowards), Konec nylonového věku (End of the Nylon Age). These were followed by the books of Czech and Slovak authors that were banned in Czechoslovakia, and therefore accessible only to the Czech and Slovak community in the United States, Canada, and elsewhere outside the communist bloc. From here the books traveled secretly to the communist homeland.

Many Czech and Slovak writers had their books published by 68 Publishers in the following two decades. Apart from Škvorecký and Salivarová themselves, they were: Bohumil Hrabal, Jan Křesadlo, Alan Levy, and Erazim Kohák. In 1981, 68 Publishers issued a book by Jaroslav Seifert (the only Czech writer to win a Nobel Prize in Literature), Všecky krásy světa (All the Beauties of the World). Expatriate Czech musician Karel Kryl had some albums released by 68 Publishers as well. Prior to 1989, 68 Publishers had published over 220 works of mostly original prose, poetry and memoir literature. Milan Kundera's novel The Unbearable Lightness of Being was first published in Czech through 68 Publishers in 1985, though it had already been published in France in 1984.
