= Kostelní Vydří =

- Municipality
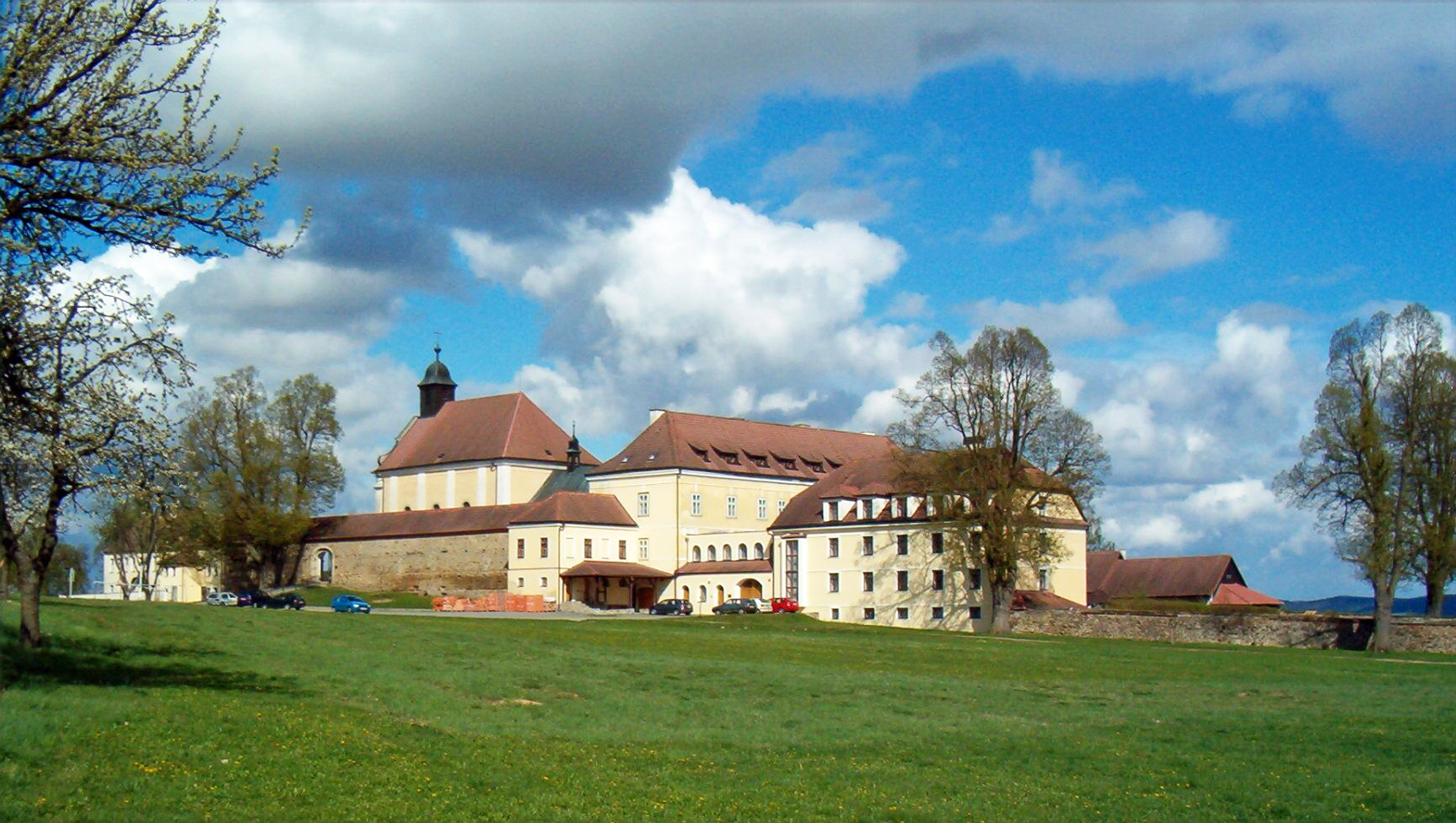
- Church of Our Lady of Mount Carmel and the Carmelitan monastery

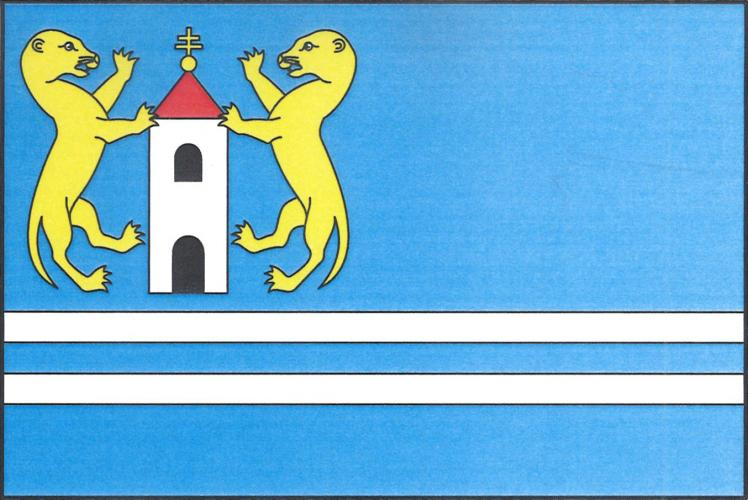
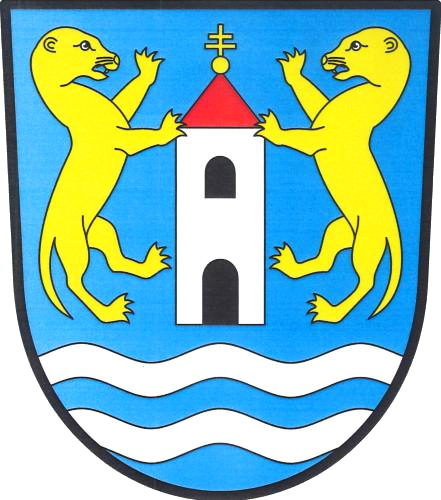
- Flag Coat of arms

- Location in the Czech Republic
- Coordinates: 49°6′22″N 15°25′18″E
- Country: Czech Republic
- Region: South Bohemian
- District: Jindřichův Hradec
- First mentioned: 1305

Area
  - Total: 6.51 km^{2} (2.51 sq mi)
- Elevation: 474 m (1,555 ft)

Population (2026-01-01)
  - Total: 164
  - Density: 25.2/km^{2} (65.2/sq mi)
- Time zone: UTC+1 (CET)
  - Summer (DST): UTC+2 (CEST)
- Postal code: 380 01
- Website: www.kostelni-vydri.cz

Kostelní Vydří (German: Kirchwiedern) is a municipality and village in Jindřichův Hradec District in the South Bohemian Region of the Czech Republic. It has about 200 inhabitants.

Kostelní Vydří lies approximately 32 kilometres (20 mi) east of Jindřichův Hradec, 71 km (44 mi) east of České Budějovice, and 131 km (81 mi) south-east of Prague.

== Demographics ==
Historical population
| Year | Pop. | ±% |
|---|---|---|
| 1869 | 348 | — |
| 1880 | 376 | +8.0% |
| 1890 | 419 | +11.4% |
| 1900 | 438 | +4.5% |
| 1910 | 424 | −3.2% |
| 1921 | 399 | −5.9% |
| 1930 | 346 | −13.3% |
| 1950 | 273 | −21.1% |
| 1961 | 264 | −3.3% |
| 1970 | 223 | −15.5% |
| 1980 | 192 | −13.9% |
| 1991 | 172 | −10.4% |
| 2001 | 158 | −8.1% |
| 2011 | 171 | +8.2% |
| 2021 | 164 | −4.1% |
Source: Censuses
