= Jaroslava Schallerová =

Czech actress

Jaroslava Schallerová (Czech pronunciation; born 25 April 1956), sometimes credited as Jarka Shallerová, is a Czech former actress who emerged during the 1970s. Her acting debut was at the age of 13 in the Czech New Wave film Valerie and Her Week of Wonders. Her film career spanned the 1970s and continued intermittently into the 1990s.

== Filmography ==
- Valerie a týden divů (1970) .... Valerie
- Szép lányok, ne sírjatok! (1970) .... Juli
- Égi bárány (1970) .... A fiatal anya
- Hangyaboly (1971) .... Gruber Helénke
- Végre, hétfö! (1971) (as Jarka Schallerova) .... Pincérlány
- Homolka a Tobolka (1972)
- My, ztracený holky (1972)
- Zlá noc (1973)
- Láska (1973) .... Andrea Vasáková
- Die Elixiere des Teufels (1973)
- Malá mořská víla (1975)
- Zaklęte rewiry (1975) .... Zośka
- Der Hasenhüter (1976) (TV) .... Prinzessin Adelheid/Anne
- Do posledného dychu (1976)
- 30 panen a Pythagoras (1977) .... Helena Trojanová
- Píseň o stromu a růži (1978) .... Vera Havlová
- Kočičí princ (1978)
- Die Gänsehirtin am Brunnen (1979)
- Útěky domů (1980)
- Křeček v noční košili (1987) TV Series
- Uf-oni jsou tady (1990) .... Jirka's mother
