= Luboš Fišer =

Czech composer (1935–1999)

Luboš Fišer (30 September 1935 – 22 June 1999) was a Czech composer, born in Prague. He was known both for his soundtracks and chamber music. From 1952 to 1956 he studied composition at the Prague Conservatory as a pupil of Emil Hlobil. From 1956 he studied at the AMU in Prague. His first publicly performed compositions were Four Pieces for Violin and Piano (1954).

== Selected compositions ==
Orchestra & Wind Ensemble

- Patnáct listů podle Dürerovy Apokalypsy (Fifteen Prints after Dürer's Apocalypse) (1965)
- Double (1969)
- Lament for chamber orchestra (1971)
- Report for wind ensemble (1971)
- Labyrinth (1977)
- Serenády pro Salzburg (Serenades for Salzburg) for chamber orchestra (1979)
- Meridián (1980)
- Sonata for orchestra (1998)

Concertante

- Concerto da camera for piano and orchestra (two versions, 1964 with full orchestra, 1970 with wind)
- Concerto for piano and orchestra (1979)
- Romance for violin and orchestra (1980)
- Concerto for two pianos and orchestra (1983)
- Concerto for violin and orchestra (1998)
- Sonata per Leonardo for guitar and orchestra
- Pastorale per Giuseppe Tartini for guitar and orchestra

Chamber

- Dialogue for trumpet and organ (1996)
- Impromptu for clarinet and piano (1986)
- Piano Trio (1978)
- Romance for violin and piano (1980)
- Ruce (Hands), Sonata for violin and piano (1961)
- Sonata for cello and piano (1975)
- Sonata for solo viola and string quartet (1991)
- Sonata for two cellos and piano (1979)
- Sonata "In Memoriam Terezin" for violin solo (1981)
- String Quartet (1983–1984)
- Sonata for cello solo (1986)
- Testis for string quartet (1980)
- Variace na neznámé téma (Variations on an Unknown Theme), for string quartet (1976)

Piano

- Sny a valčíky (Dreams and Waltzes) (1993)
- Sonata No.1 (1955)
- Sonata No.3 (1960)
- Sonata No.4 (1962–1964)
- Sonata No.5 (1974)
- Sonata No.6 "Fras" (1978)
- Sonata No.7 (1987)
- Sonata No.8 (1996)

Organ

- Reliéf (The Relief) for organ solo (1964)

Choral

- Requiem (1968)
- Vánoční koledy (Christmas Carols) for soloists, mixed choir, and orchestra (1969)

Vocal

- Istanu, Melodrama for reciter, alto flute, and four percussionists (1980)
- Zapomenuté písně (Forgotten Songs) on Texts of Gypsy Poetry for mezzo-soprano, alto flute, viola, and piano (1985)

Soundtrack

- On the Comet (1970)
- Valerie and Her Week of Wonders (Finders Keepers Records 2006)
- Morgiana (Finders Keepers Records 2013)
