= Anca Parvulescu =

Professor of Literature

Anca Pârvulescu is a scholar of comparative literature specializing in global modernism, literary and critical theory, literary comparatist, migration studies, and East Europe. She is the Liselotte Dieckmann Professor of Comparative Literature in the Department of English at the Washington University in St. Louis.

== Education ==
Parvulescu earned a B.A. in English Literature from the West University of Timișoara in Romania and a Ph.D. in English Literature from the University of Minnesota in the United States.

== Career ==
After an assistant and associate professorship at the Washington University in St. Louis, Parvulescu became a full professor in its Department of English. In 2022, she took up the post of Liselotte Dieckmann Professor of Comparative Literature.

In 2024, Parvulescu obtained a $1.2 million European Union Next Generation grant to investigate the history of comparatism and the origins of the comparative method.

== Research ==
Parvulescu is an expert in international modernism, affect theory, Eastern Europe, and the history of comparatism. Her first book, Laughter: Notes on a Passion, was published in 2010 by MIT Press.

== Books ==
- Face and Form: Physiognomy in Literary Modernism. Cambridge University Press, 2025.
- Creolizing the Modern: Transylvania across Empires. Cornell University Press, 2022 - with Manuela Boatcă.
- The Traffic in Women's Work: East European Migration and the Making of Europe. University of Chicago Press, 2014.
- Laughter: Notes on a Passion. MIT Press, 2010.

== Awards ==
- Barrington Moore Book Award, American Sociological Association (ASA)
- René Wellek Prize for Best Book in Comparative Literature, American Comparative Literature Association (ACLA)
