= Jan Schmidt (director) =

Czech film director (1934–2019)

- Born: 3 January 1934; Prague, Czechoslovakia
- Died: 27 September 2019 (aged 85)
- Occupation: Film director
- Years active: 1960–1995

Jan Schmidt (3 January 1934 – 27 September 2019) was a Czech film director. He directed sixteen films between 1960 and 1995. His 1969 film The Lanfier Colony was entered into the 6th Moscow International Film Festival.

== Selected filmography ==
- Joseph Kilian (1963)
- Late August at the Hotel Ozone (1967)
- The Lanfier Colony (1969)
- The Bride with the Most Beautiful Eyes (1976)
- Settlement of Crows (1978)
- The Death of a Talented Cobbler (1983)
- Lenin, Lord and Mother (1990)
- Vracenky (1990)
