= Jiří Svoboda (director) =

Czech filmmaker and politician (born 1945)

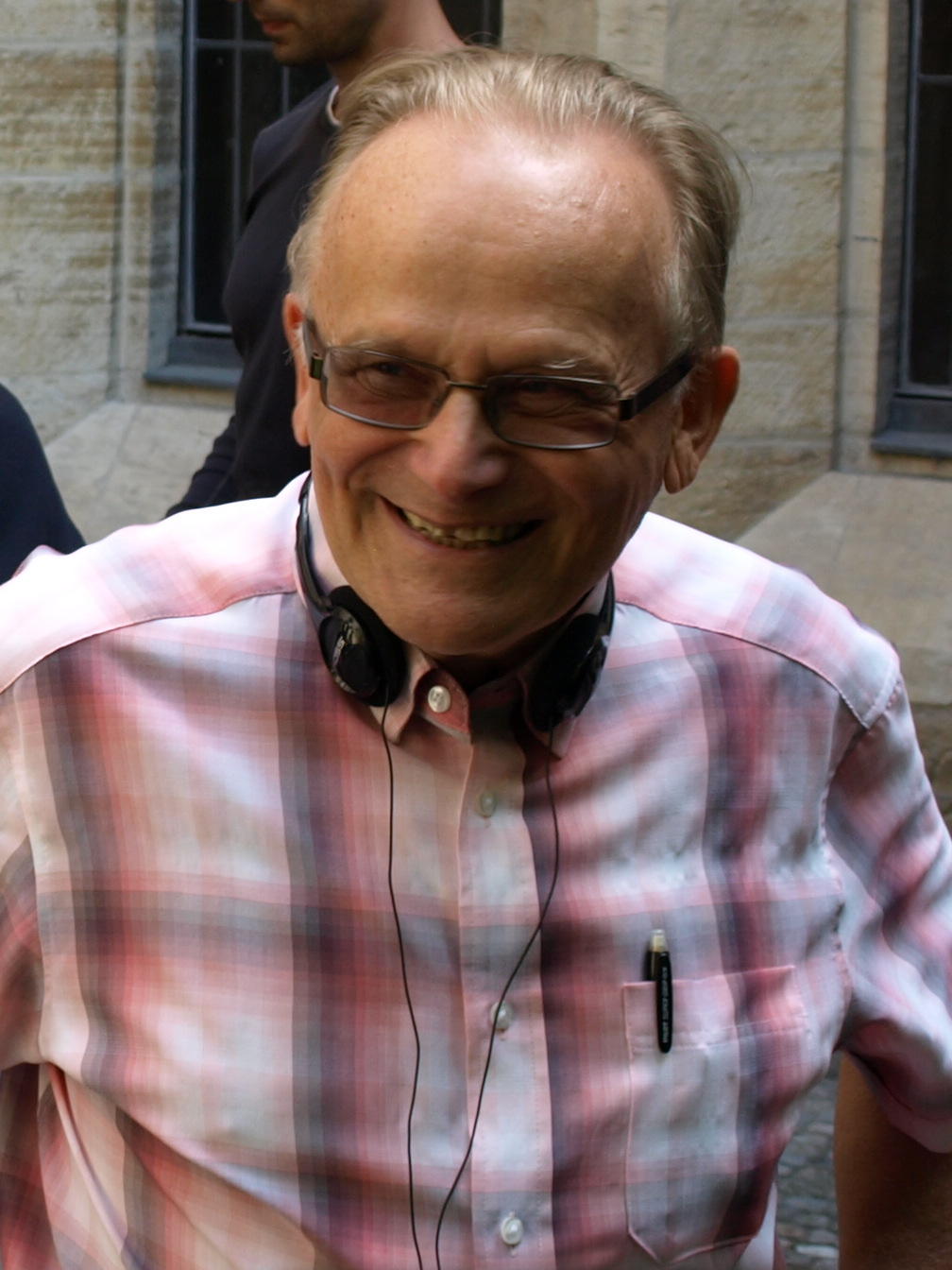

Leader of the Communist Party of Bohemia and Moravia
- In office 13 October 1990 – 25 June 1993
- Preceded by: Jiří Machalík
- Succeeded by: Miroslav Grebeníček

Personal details
- Born: 5 May 1945 (age 80) Kladen, Protectorate of Bohemia and Moravia
- Party: KSČ (1975–1990); KSČM (1990–1993)

Jiří Svoboda (born 5 May 1945 in Kladno) is a Czech film and TV director, screenwriter and retired politician. He was leader of the Communist Party of Bohemia and Moravia (KSČM) from 1990 to 1993. In 2017 he received the World Prize for Humanism from the Macedonian-based Ohrid Academy of Humanism.

== Career ==
In 1996 Svoboda unsuccessfully ran for the Senate as an independent candidate for the Party of the Democratic Left. From 1999 to 2004 he was a professor of film art at Film and TV School of the Academy of Performing Arts in Prague (FAMU). As a journalist he also occasionally participates in historical debates about Czech history up until the Middle Ages. He holds atheist viewpoints.

== Filmography ==
=== Director ===
- 1974 – Motiv pro vraždu
- 1975 – Zrcadlo pro Kristýnu
- 1977 – The Blue Planet (Modrá planeta)
- 1980 – Dívka s mušlí
- 1981 – Řetěz
- 1982 – Schůzka se stíny
- 1983 – Oblouk světla – TV film
- 1983 – Zánik samoty Berhof
- 1985 – Scalpel, Please (Skalpel, prosím)
- 1986 – Papilio
- 1987 – Svět nic neví
- 1988 – Prokletí domu Hajnů
- 1990 – Jen o rodinných záležitostech
- 1995 – Co Hedvika neřekla – TV film
- 2002 – Udělení milosti se zamítá – TV film
- 2005 – Sametoví vrazi
- 2005 – Rána z milosti – TV film
- 2005 – Jasnovidec – TV film
- 2007 – Boží duha – TV film
- 2010 – Domina TV film
- 2014 – Poslední cyklista
- 2015 – Jan Hus
- 2017 – Zádušní oběť TV film
