= Jaromil Jireš =

Czech film director and screenwriter (1935–2001)

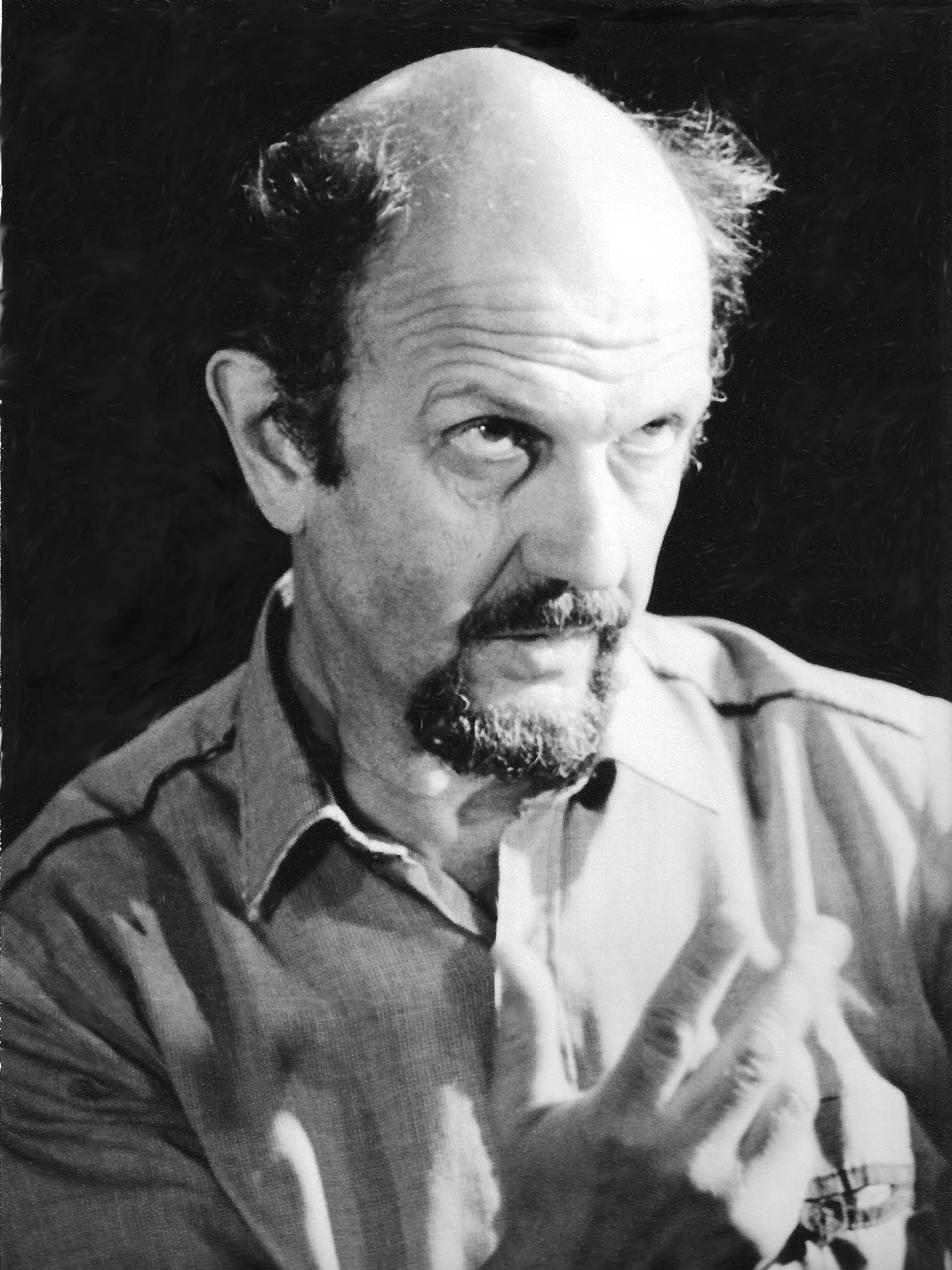
- Jireš in 1986
- Born: 10 December 1935; Bratislava, Czechoslovakia
- Died: 24 October 2001 (aged 65); Prague, Czech Republic
- Occupations: Film director, screenwriter
- Years active: 1958–1999

Jaromil Jireš (10 December 1935 – 24 October 2001) was a Czech film director and screenwriter. He was associated with the Czechoslovak New Wave movement.

== Work ==
His 1963 film The Cry was entered into the 1964 Cannes Film Festival. It is often described as the first film of the Czechoslovak New Wave, a movement known for its dark humor, use of non-professional actors, and "art-cinema realism".

Another of Jireš's prominent works is The Joke (1969), adapted from a novel by Milan Kundera. It tells the story of Ludvik Jahn, a man expelled from the Czechoslovak Communist Party for an idle joke to his girlfriend, and the revenge he later seeks through adultery. The film was produced during the political liberalization of the 1968 Prague Spring and contains many scenes which satirize and criticize the country's communist leadership. Released after the Warsaw Pact invasion of Czechoslovakia, the film had initial success in theaters but was then banned by authorities for the next twenty years. Amos Vogel wrote that the film was "possibly the most shattering indictment of totalitarianism to come out of a Communist country".

Valerie and Her Week of Wonders (1970), set in the early 19th century, was based on a novel by Vítězslav Nezval. It is a film in a Gothic style concerning the onset of menstruation and the sexual awakening of a thirteen-year-old girl.

His 1979 film The Young Man and Moby Dick was entered into the 11th Moscow International Film Festival.

Following the Soviet takeover of Czechoslovakia, Jireš continued to work in the country, making less controversial material. In 1971, he directed My Love to the Swallows, a World War II film about a Czech resistance fighter. His 1982 film Incomplete Eclipse was entered into the 33rd Berlin International Film Festival. He continued making films through the '80s and '90s, including ballet and opera documentaries for television.

== Filmography ==
=== Films ===
- Uncle (Short, 1959)
- Footprints (Short, 1960)
- The Cry (1964)
- The Log Cabin (Short, 1965)
- Pearls of the Deep (segment "Romance", 1966)
- Don Juan 68 (Short, 1968)
- The Joke (1969)
- Valerie and Her Week of Wonders (1970)
- And Give My Love to the Swallows (1972)
- People from the Subway (1974)
- Talíře nad Velkým Malíkovem (1977)
- The Young Man and Moby Dick (1979)
- Payment in Kind (1980)
- Útěky domů (1980)
- Opera ve vinici (1981)
- Incomplete Eclipse (1983)
- Katapult (1984)
- Prodloužený čas (1984)
- Lev s bílou hřívou (1986)
- Labyrinth (1991)
- Helimadoe (1994)
- The Dance Teacher (1995)
- Double Role (1999)

=== Television films ===
- Island of the Silver Herons (TV Movie, 1976)
- The Diary of One Who Disappeared (TV Movie, 1979)
- O Háderunovi a víle Elóře (TV Movie, 1987)
- Naděje má hluboké dno (TV Movie, 1988)
- And If There Are Angels Here (TV Movie, 1992)

=== Documentaries ===
- Fever (Documentary short, 1958)
- The Hall of Lost Steps (Short, 1960)
- Don Špagát (Short, 1962)
- Citizen Karel Havlíček (Short, 1966)
- The King Game (Short, 1967)
- The Journey of Vincence Mostek and Simon Pesl of Vlcnov to Prague A.D. 1969 (short, 1969)
- Grandpa (Documentary short, 1969)
- Court of Justice (Short documentary, 1969)
- Leoš Janáček (TV Movie, 1973)
- The Safe Cracker (Short, 1974)
- Il divino Boemo (Short, 1974)
- Svět Alfonse muchy (1980)
- Bohuslav Martinů (TV Movie, 1980)
- Kouzelná Praha Rudolfa II (TV Movie, 1982)
- Milos Forman - Das Kuckucksei (TV Movie documentary, 1985)
- Sidney Lumet: I Love New York (TV Movie documentary, 1987)
- Po zarostlem chodnícku (Documentary, 1987)
- Antonín Dvorák (TV Mini-Series, 1990)
- F. Murray Abraham (TV Movie documentary, 1991)
- Beschreibung eines Kampfes (1991)
- Rekviem za ty, kteři přežili (Documentary, 1992)
- Hudba a víra (TV Movie documentary, 1992)
- Hudba a bolest (TV Movie documentary, 1992)
