= Jan Klusák =

Czech composer

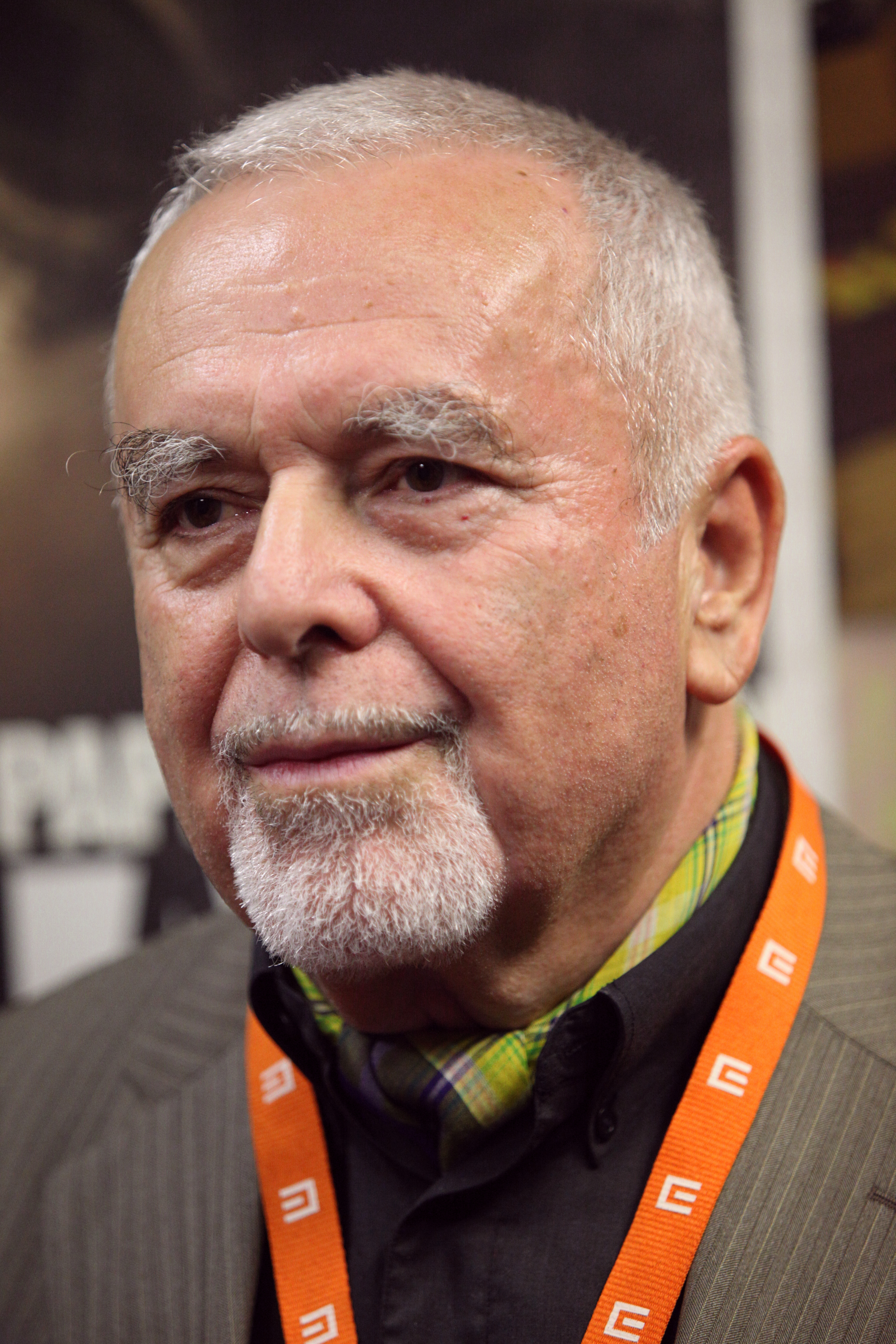
- Jan Klusák at Karlovy Vary Film Festival in 2009
- Born: Jan Porges; April 18, 1934; Prague, Czechoslovakia
- Occupations: Composer, Actor
- Spouse: Jana Klusáková
- Children: Pavel Klusák; Vít Klusák

Jan Klusák (born 18 April 1934 in Prague as Jan Porges) is a contemporary Czech composer, author of film, television and incidental music.

== Life ==
Klusák was born to a Czech Jewish family, who owned a farm in Prosek, Prague. After he graduated from the gymnasium, he pursued his studies at the Prague Music Academy as a pupil of Jaroslav Řídký and Pavel Bořkovec (in 1953-57). Later he concentrated solely on composing.

He has never worked directly with music groups or schools, although his style was temporarily influenced by the music of Sergei Prokofiev and Igor Stravinsky, and later by the Second Viennese School, especially by Alban Berg and Serialism. Since 1959 he cooperated closely with Czech conductor Libor Pešek and with Chamber Philharmony. However, after the Warsaw Pact invasion of Czechoslovakia in August 1968, Klusák was condemned as a "politically undesirable" person (he composed music for prohibited films). During the normalization Klusák was engaged in the Jára Cimrman Theatre, but he was forced to leave in 1975. In the 1980s Klusák focused more on vocal compositions. He began to compose song cycles, cantatas, and wrote an opera.

Following the Velvet Revolution in 1989, he began to participate in public life again, and worked as a member and director of various cultural institutions in the Czech Republic. He was awarded a "Classic 1995" Award for his compositions and for his String Quartet No. 5 in particular.

Since the 1960s he occasionally acted in films, such as A Report on the Party and the Guests (1966) or Valerie and Her Week of Wonder (1970).

== Selected works ==
=== Compositions ===
- Partita for viola solo (1954)
- Concertino for flute, violin, viola and cello (1955)
- Contrappunto fiorito for flute, English horn, clarinet, bassoon, violin, viola, cello and piano (1955–1956)
- Eight Inventions for Various Instrumental Arrangement (1961–73) - his key work
- Four Little Voice Exercises to the Words of Franz Kafka (1960)
- Images for 12 Wind Instruments (1962)
- Variations on the Theme of Gustav Mahler (1962)
- String Quartet No. 2. (1962)
- Rejdovák for bass clarinet, viola and double bass (1965)
- Sonata for String and Wind Instruments (1965)
- Le forgeron harmonieux: variations on George Frideric Handel's The Harmonious Blacksmith per grande orchestra (1966)
- Rondeau for Piano (1967)
- Radix nativitatis I.S. for voice, flute, clarinet, viola and piano (1972)
- Duet for Flute and Piano (1977)
- Zenith Moon - 4 Poems of Anna Achmatová for mezzo-soprano, clarinet, viola and klavier (1981)
- Monolog „Ubi vult“ (Monologue "Ubi vult") for viola solo (1987)
- String Quartet No. 4 (1994)
- String Quartet No. 5 (1970)
- String Quartet No. 6 (1970)
- Whatever you want (1986) - opera

=== Film music ===
- The Cry (1963)
- Courage for Every Day (1963)
- Perličky na dně (1964)
- Návrat ztraceného syna (1965)
- Martyrs of Love (1966)
- Late August at the Hotel Ozone (1966)
- Farářův konec (1968)
- Hospital at the End of the City (1977) TV series
- Dimensions of Dialogue (1982) short film
