= Trilobit Award =

Czech award in filmmaking and television

- Awarded for: Excellence in cinematic (and, at least historically, televisual) achievements
- Country: Czech Republic
- Presented by: Czech Film and Television Union
- Website: Official website

The Trilobit Award (Czech: Ceny Trilobit) is an annual award that recognize accomplishments in filmmaking and television. It is one of highest awards of achievement in film awarded in the Czech Republic and it is awarded by Czech Film and Television Union. The award was first awarded in the 1960s but banned in the 1970s. It was however, re-established in 1991.

== History ==
- TRILOBIT 2018
- TRILOBIT 2017
- TRILOBIT 2016
- TRILOBIT 2014
- TRILOBIT 2013
- TRILOBIT 2012
- TRILOBIT 2011
- TRILOBIT 2010
