= Tereza Kučerová =

Czech artist (born 1964)

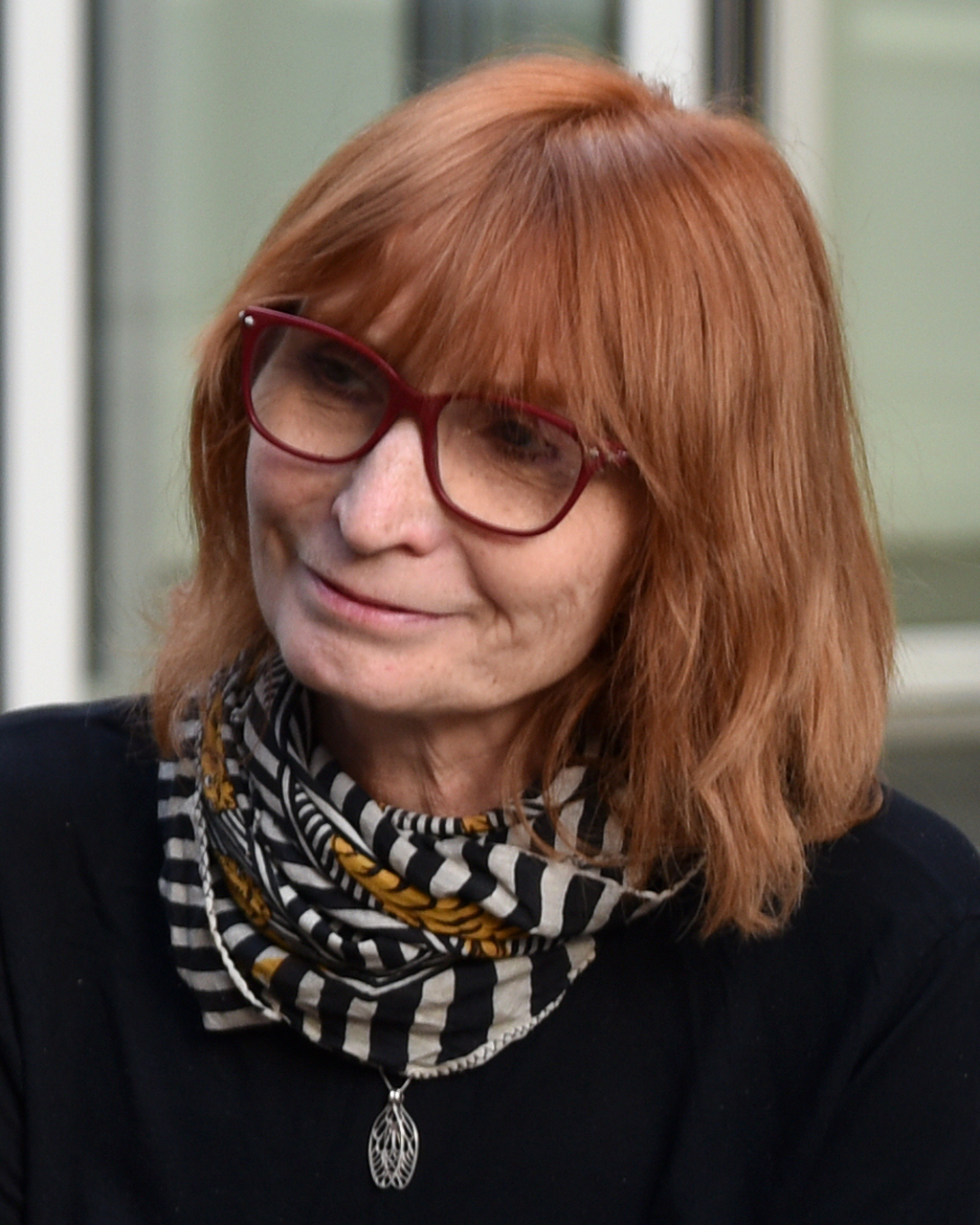
Tereza Kučerová in 2021

Tereza Kučerová (born 5 May 1964) is a Czech artist. Her parents are Věra Chytilová and Jaroslav Kučera.

A native of Prague, Kučerová is a graduate of the Academy of Arts, Architecture and Design in Prague, where she studied from 1982 until 1988 and worked with Miloslav Jágr. During her career she has worked in a variety of fields, including graphic art, painting, and design. As a costume designer she has been associated with a number of films, and she has created several cartoons, which have been seen at numerous animation festivals. She has exhibited her work in the Czech Republic. Kučerová joined the Hollar Association of Czech Graphic Artists in 2016. Two 1993 lithographs in color, Pani B/Mrs. B and Rust/Growth, are owned by the National Gallery of Art.
