= Josef Škvorecký =

Czech-Canadian writer and publisher (1924–2012)

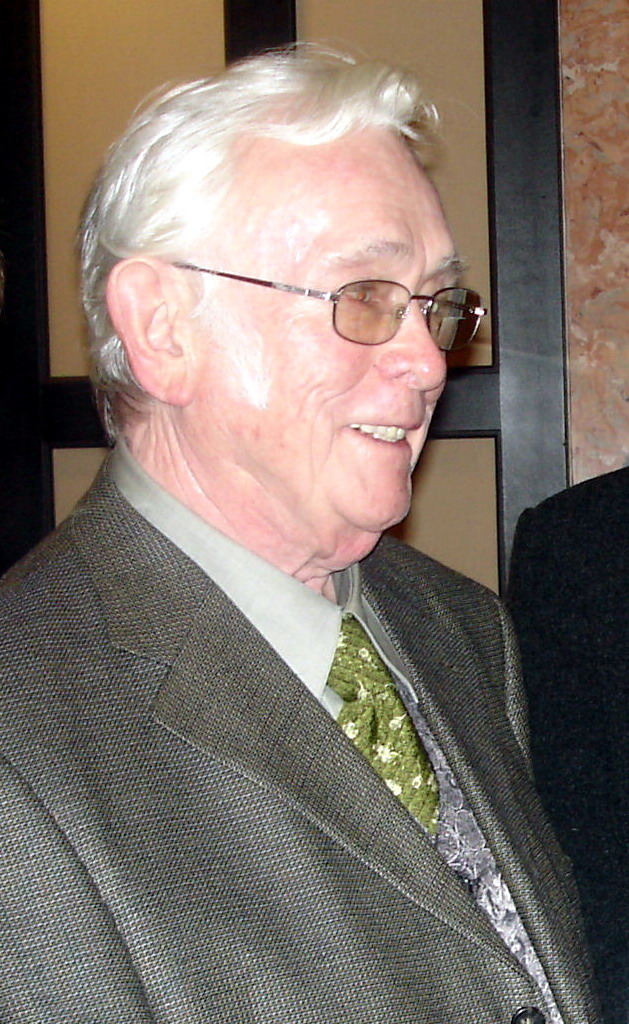
- Škvorecký in 2004
- Born: September 27, 1924; Náchod, Czechoslovakia
- Died: January 3, 2012 (aged 87); Toronto, Ontario, Canada
- Occupations: Writer, publisher
- Spouse: Zdena Salivarová
- Writing career
- Language: Czech, English
- Period: 1948–2004
- Notable works: Zbabělci; Tankový prapor Miss Silver's Past

Josef Škvorecký CM (Czech pronunciation: [ˈjozɛf ˈʃkvorɛtskiː]; September 27, 1924 – January 3, 2012) was a Czech-Canadian writer and publisher. He spent half of his life in Canada, publishing and supporting banned Czech literature during the communist era. Škvorecký was awarded the Neustadt International Prize for Literature in 1980. He and his wife were long-time supporters of Czech dissident writers before the fall of communism in that country. Škvorecký's fiction deals with several themes: the horrors of totalitarianism and repression, the expatriate experience, and the miracle of jazz.

== Life ==
Born the son of a bank clerk in Náchod, Czechoslovakia, Škvorecký graduated in 1943 from the Reálné gymnasium in his native Náchod. He had a youthful love-affair with jazz and was an amateur tenor saxophone player in the period just prior to the Second World War, an experience he drew upon for his novella The Bass Saxophone (1967). For two years during the war he was a slave labourer in a Messerschmitt aircraft factory in Náchod.

After the war, he began to study at the Faculty of Medicine of Charles University in Prague, but after his first term he moved to the Faculty of Arts, where he studied philosophy and graduated in 1949. In 1951 he gained a PhD in philosophy. He then taught for two years at the Social School for Girls in Hořice. Between 1952 and 1954 he performed his military service in the Czechoslovak Army.

He worked briefly as a teacher, editor and translator in the 1950s. In this period he completed several novels including his first novel The Cowards (written in 1948–1949, published in 1958) and The End of the Nylon Age (1956). They were condemned and banned by the Communist authorities after their publication. His prose style, open-ended and improvisational, was an innovation, but this and his democratic ideals were a challenge to the Communist regime. As a result, he lost his job as editor of the magazine Světová literatura ("World Literature"). Škvorecký kept writing, and helped nurture the democratic movement that culminated in the Prague Spring in 1968.

After the Warsaw Pact invasion of Czechoslovakia that year, Škvorecký and his wife, writer and actress Zdena Salivarová, fled to Canada.

In 1971, he and his wife founded 68 Publishers which, over the next 20 years, published banned Czech and Slovak books. The imprint became an important mouthpiece for dissident writers, such as Václav Havel, Milan Kundera, and Ludvík Vaculík, among many others. For providing this critical literary outlet, the president of post-Communist Czechoslovakia, Václav Havel, later awarded the couple the Order of the White Lion in 1990.

He taught at the Department of English at the University of Toronto where he was eventually appointed Professor Emeritus of English and Film. He retired in 1990. In Canada, he is considered to be a Canadian author despite the fact that he is mostly published in Czech.

== Literary works ==
Most of Škvorecký's novels are available in English: the novels The Cowards, Miss Silver's Past, The Republic of Whores, The Miracle Game, The Swell Season, The Engineer of Human Souls which won a Canadian Governor General's Award, The Bride of Texas, Dvořák in Love, The Tenor Saxophonist's Story, Two Murders in My Double Life, An Inexplicable Story or The Narrative of Questus Firmus Siculus, his selected short stories When Eve Was Naked and the two short novels The Bass Saxophone and Emöke. A recurring character in several of his novels is Danny Smiricky, who is a partial self-portrait of the author.

He wrote four books of detective stories featuring Lieutenant Borůvka of the Prague Homicide Bureau: The Mournful Demeanor of Lieutenant Borůvka, Sins for Father Knox, The End of Lieutenant Borůvka and The Return of Lieutenant Borůvka.

His poetry was published as a collection in 1999 as ...there's no remedy for this pain (...na tuhle bolest nejsou prášky).

His non-fiction works include Talkin' Moscow Blues, a book of essays on jazz, literature and politics, an autobiography Headed for the Blues, and two books on the Czech cinema including All the Bright Young Men and Women.

In Middle Europe, he was also a well-known Cthulhu Mythos expert, who wrote many prefaces to H. P. Lovecraft's works.

Škvorecký wrote for films and television. The feature film The Tank Battalion was adapted from his novel The Republic of Whores. Other features, written for Prague TV, include Eine kleine Jazzmusik, adapted from his story of the same name, The Emöke Legend from a novella of the same name, and a two-hour TV drama Poe and the Murder of a Beautiful Girl, based on Edgar Allan Poe's story The Mystery of Marie Roget. Three very successful TV serials were made from his stories: Sins for Father Knox, The Swell Season and Murders for Luck.

A film version of the novel Pastor's End was produced in 1968, but was never shown and went straight into locked Communist archives due to the fact that its author "illegally" fled the country. In the spring and summer of 1968 Škvorecký and the Czech film director Miloš Forman jointly wrote a script synopsis to make a film version of The Cowards. After Škvorecký fled the Warsaw Pact invasion the synopsis was translated into English, but no film was made. In the 21st century the English translation was translated back into Czech and has been published.

Prominent in his writing for radio was a long-running monthly series on literature for Voice of America. From 1973 to 1990 he wrote more than 200 of these shows covering notable literary works and discussing literary themes.

He died on January 3, 2012, in Toronto, Ontario, from cancer; he was 87 years old.

== Awards ==
Among his numerous literary awards are the Neustadt International Prize for Literature (1980), the Canadian Governor General's Award for English-language fiction (1984), the Czech Republic State Prize for Literature (1999), the Prize of the Comenius Pangea Foundation "For Improvement of Human Affairs" (2001) which he received with the Polish film director Andrzej Wajda as well as the Angelus Award (2009).

Nominated for the Nobel Prize in 1982.

Awarded the Order of the White Lion by the President of Czechoslovakia, Václav Havel, 1990.

In 1992 he was made a Member of the Order of Canada.

Škvorecký was a Guggenheim Fellow, and a Fellow of the Royal Society of Canada.

Chevalier de l'Ordre des Arts et des Lettres, République Française, 1996.

== Selected bibliography ==
Novels

- Konec nylonového věku (End of the Nylon Age), 1956 (banned by censors)
- Zbabělci (The Cowards), 1958
- Lvíče (The Lion Cub, translated into English as Miss Silver's Past), 1969
- Tankový prapor (The Tank Battalion, translated into English as The Republic of Whores), 1969
- Mirákl (The Miracle Game), 1972
- Prima sezóna (The Swell Season), 1975
- Konec poručíka Borůvky (The End of Lieutenant Borůvka), 1975
- Příběh inženýra lidských duší (The Engineer of Human Souls), 1977
- Návrat poručíka Borůvky (The Return of Lieutenant Borůvka), 1980
- Scherzo capriccioso (translated into English as Dvořák in Love), 1984 - story about Antonín Dvořák's time in America as director of the National Conservatory for Music.
- Nevěsta z Texasu (The Bride from Texas), 1992
- Dvě vraždy v mém dvojím životě (Two Murders in My Double Life), 1999
- Nevysvětlitelný příběh aneb Vyprávění Questa Firma Sicula (An Inexplicable Story, or, The Narrative of Questus Firmus Siculus), 1998
- Krátké setkání, s vraždou (Brief Encounter, with Murder), 1999, co-written with Zdena Salivarová
- Setkání po letech, s vraždou (Encounter After Many Years, with Murder), 2001, co-written with Zdena Salivarová
- Setkání na konci éry, s vraždou (Encounter at the End of an Era, with Murder), 2001, co-written with Zdena Salivarová
- Obyčejné źivoty (Ordinary Lives), 2004

Novellas

- Legenda Emöke (The Legend of Emöke), 1963
- Bassaxofon (The Bass Saxophone), 1967

Collections of short stories

- Sedmiramenný svícen (The Menorah), 1964
- Ze života lepší společnosti (The Life of High Society), 1965
- Smutek poručíka Borůvky (The Mournful Demeanour of Lieutenant Borůvka), 1966
- Babylónský příběh a jiné povídky ('A Babylonian Story and Other Stories), 1967
- Hořkej svět (The Bitter World), 1969
- Hříchy pro pátera Knoxe (Sins for Father Knox), 1973
- Ze života české společnosti (The Life of Czech Society), 1985
- Povídky tenorsaxofonisty (The Tenor Saxophonist's Story), 1993
- Povídky z Rajského údolí (The Edenvale Stories), 1996
- When Eve Was Naked, 2000

Collections of essays

- Nápady čtenáře detektivek (Reading Detective Stories), 1965
- O nich – o nás (They – That Is: Us), 1968
- Samožerbuch (The Book of Self-Praise), 1977
- All the Bright Young Men and Women (English translation of Všichni ti bystří mladí muži a ženy), 1972
- Na brigádě (Working Overtime), 1979
- Jirí Menzel and the History of the Closely Watched Trains, 1982
- Talkin' Moscow Blues, 1988
- Franz Kafka, jazz a jiné marginálie (Franz Kafka, Jazz and other Marginal Matters), 1988
- ... In the lonesome October, 1994
- Le Camarade Joueur de jazz, 1996
