= List of Czech film directors =

This article provides a list of Czech film directors.

== B ==
- Jaroslav Balík
- Jiří Barta
- Jiří Brdečka
- Zbyněk Brynych
- Jan Budař
- Václav Bedřich
- Vlasta Burian

== C ==
- Jiří Chlumský
- Věra Chytilová
- Radúz Činčera

== D ==
- Oldřich Daněk

== F ==
- Miloš Forman
- Martin Frič

== G ==
- Saša Gedeon

== H ==
- Hugo Haas
- Ondřej Havelka
- Karel Hašler
- Hermína Týrlová
- Juraj Herz
- Jan Hřebejk

== I ==
- Svatopluk Innemann

== J ==
- Juraj Jakubisko
- Karel Janák
- Vojtěch Jasný
- Jaromil Jireš
- Pavel Juráček

== K ==
- Antonín Kachlík
- Karel Kachyňa
- Ján Kadár
- Jan Kačer
- Ondřej Kepka
- Elmar Klos
- Pavel Koutecký
- Jan Kratochvíl
- Jiří Krejčík
- Ester Krumbachová
- Václav Krška
- Jan Kříženecký

== L ==
- Karel Lamač
- Oldřich Lipský

== M ==
- Josef Mach
- Gustav Machatý
- Václav Matějka
- Jiří Menzel
- Vladimír Merta
- Vladimír Michálek
- Zdeněk Miler
- Vladimír Morávek
- Josef František Munclinger
- Antonín Máša
- Josef Šváb-Malostranský

== N ==
- Alice Nellis
- Jan Němec
- Diana Cam Van Nguyen

== P ==
- Ivan Passer
- Jan Pinkava
- Karel Plicka
- Zdeněk Podskalský
- Břetislav Pojar
- Marie Poledňáková
- Jindřich Polák

== R ==
- Karel Reisz
- Filip Renč
- Josef Rovenský
- Břetislav Rychlík
- Ladislav Rychman
- Ludvík Ráža
- Čestmír Řanda

== S ==
- Jan Schmidt
- Evald Schorm
- Jiří Sequens
- Bohdan Sláma
- Ladislav Smoljak
- Karel Smyczek
- Jaroslav Soukup
- Karel Steklý
- Jiří Strach
- Martin Suchánek
- Jan Svěrák
- Radim Špaček
- Milan Šteindler
- Jan Švankmajer

== T ==
- Jan Tománek
- Jiří Trnka
- Ondřej Trojan
- Zdeněk Troška
- Helena Třeštíková

== V ==
- Vladislav Vančura
- Drahomíra Vihanová
- František Vláčil
- Tomáš Vorel
- Václav Vorlíček
- Otakar Vávra
- Dana Vávrová

== W ==
- Jiří Weiss

== Z ==
- Petr Zelenka
- Karel Zeman
