= 2003 Czech Lion Awards =

Czech film award ceremony

11th Czech Lion Awards
- Date: March 8, 2004
- Site: Prague
- Hosted by: Martin Zbrožek

Highlights
- Best Picture: Boredom in Brno
- Most awards: Boredom in Brno (5)
- Most nominations: Želary (11)

Television coverage
- Network: Česká televize

2002 Czech Lion Awards ceremony was held on 8 March 2004.

== Winners and nominees ==
Best Film	Best Director
Boredom in Brno; Pupendo; Želary	Václav Morávek — Boredom in Brno; Jan Hřebejk — Pupendo; Ondřej Trojan — Želary
Best Actor in a Leading Role	Best Actress in a Leading Role
Boredom in Brno – Jan Budař; Pupendo – Bolek Polívka; Želary – György Cserhalmi	Želary – Anna Geislerová; Faithless Games – Zuzana Stivínová; Boredom in Brno – Kateřina Holánová
Best Actor in a Supporting Role	Best Actress in a Supporting Role
One Hand Can't Clap – Ivan Trojan; Boredom in Brno – Miroslav Donutil; Pupendo – Jaroslav Dušek	Pupendo – Vilma Cibulková; Cruel Joys – Anna Šišková; Želary – Jaroslava Adamová
Best Screenplay	Best Editing
Boredom in Brno – Jan Budař, Vladimír Morávek; Pupendo – Petr Jarchovský; Želary – Petr Jarchovský	Boredom in Brno – Jiří Brožek; Cruel Joys – Alois Fišárek; Želary– Vladimír Barák
Design	Best Cinematography
Smart Philip – Jan Vlasák; The Devil Knows Why – František Lipták a Kateřina Kopicová; Želary – Milan Býček	Smart Philip – Vladimír Smutný; Cruel Joys – Martin Štrba; Želary – Asen Šopov
Music	Sound
One Hand Can't Clap – Jan P. Muchow; Smart Philip – Milan Kymlička; Želary – Petr Ostrouchov	Želary – Jiří Klenka; One Hand Can't Clap – Jakub Čech a Pavel Rejholec; Faithless Games – Daniel Němec
Unique Contribution to Czech Film
Theodor Pištěk

=== Non-statutory Awards ===
Best Foreign Film	Most Popular Film
The Pianist	Pupendo
Worst Film	Cinema Readers' Award
Kameňák	Pupendo
Film Critics' Award	Best Film Poster
Boredom in Brno; Pupendo; Želary	Sentiment – Tomáš Machek; One Hand Can't Clap – Zuzana Lednická a Aleš Najbrt; Pupendo – Aleš Najbrt
