= Marov =

Marov is a Slavic masculine surname, its feminine counterpart is Marova or Márová. Notable people with the surname include:

- Libuše Márová (born 1943), Czech operatic mezzo-soprano
- Netsai Marova, Zimbabwean activist
- Nikola Márová, Czech ballerina
- Valery Marov (born 1993), Belarusian football player
