= Suchánek =

Suchánek (Czech feminine Suchánková) is a Slavic surname. Notable people with the surname include:

- Andreas Suchanek (born 1961), German economist
- Claus Suchanek (born 1979), German slalom canoeist
- Daniel Suchánek (born 1993), Czech canoeist
- Ingrida Suchánková (born 1993), Slovak karateka
- Jakub Suchánek (born 1984), Czech ice hockey player
- Jiří Suchánek (born 1982), Czech para table tennis player
- Les Suchanek, Australian soccer player
- Martin Suchánek (born 1958), Czech film director, photographer and screenwriter
- Michal Suchánek (born 1987), Canadian actor
- Michal Suchánek (Czech actor) (born 1965), Czech actor and comedian
- Rudolf Suchánek (born 1962), Czech ice hockey player
- Tomáš Suchánek (born 1984), Czech motorcycle speedway rider
- Věra Suchánková (1932–2004), Czech ice skater
- Vladimír Suchánek (1933–2021), Czech artist
