= List of accolades received by The Pianist =

The Pianist accolades
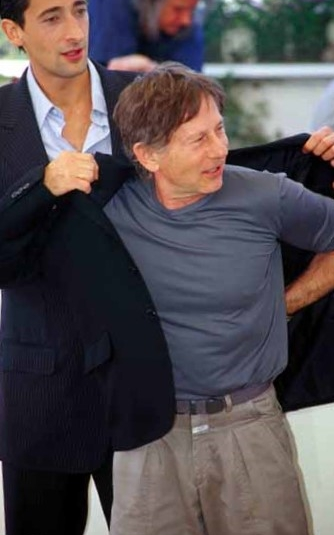
- Adrien Brody (left) and Roman Polanski (right) received several accolades for their respective performance and direction in the film.
Awards and nominations
Award	Wins	Nominations
Academy Awards	3	7
British Academy Film Awards	2	7
Cannes Film Festival Awards	1	1
César Awards	7	10
Critics' Choice Movie Awards	0	2
Czech Lion Awards	1	1
David di Donatello Awards	1	1
Directors Guild of America Awards	0	1
European Film Awards	1	4
Golden Eagle Awards	1	1
Golden Globe Awards	0	2
Goya Awards	1	1
Grande Prêmio do Cinema Brasileiro	0	1
Japan Academy Film Prize	1	1
Polish Film Awards	8	13
Screen Actors Guild Awards	0	1

Totals (Note: Certain award groups do not simply award one winner. They acknowledge several different recipients, have runners-up, and have third place. Since this is a specific recognition and is different from losing an award, runner-up mentions are considered wins in this award tally. For simplification and to avoid errors, each award in this list has been presumed to have had a prior nomination.)
- Wins: 47
- Nominations: 101

The Pianist is a 2002 epic biographical Holocaust war drama film directed by Roman Polanski and co-produced by France, the United Kingdom, Germany, and Poland. Starring Adrien Brody and written by Ronald Harwood, it is based on the 1946 autobiographical book of the same name, a Holocaust memoir by the Polish-Jewish pianist and composer Władysław Szpilman.

The Pianist premiered at the 2002 Cannes Film Festival on 24 May 2002, where it won the Palme d'Or, and received a wide release during September of the same year. The film was successful at the box office, earning over $120 million against its $35 million budget. Rotten Tomatoes, a review aggregator, surveyed 189 reviews and judged 95% to be positive. The film has been nominated for 100 awards, winning 47; Polanski's direction, Harwood's screenplay, and Brody's performance have received the most attention from award groups.

The Pianist received seven nominations at the 75th Academy Awards, including Best Picture, and it won three: Best Director (Polanski), Best Actor (Brody), and Best Adapted Screenplay (Harwood). Its other nominations were for Best Cinematography (Paweł Edelman), Best Costume Design (Anna B. Sheppard), and Best Film Editing (Hervé de Luze). At age 29, Brody became the youngest person to ever win Best Actor. The film also received seven nominations at the 56th British Academy Film Awards, where it won for Best Film and Best Direction.

The Pianist became the most awarded film at the 28th César Awards with seven wins out of 10 nominations, receiving Best Film, Best Director, Best Actor, Best Cinematography, Best Music (Wojciech Kilar), Best Production Design (Allan Starski), and Best Sound (Jean-Marie Blondel, Gerard Hardy, and Dean Humphreys). The Pianist was also recognized by several other major organizations around the world, including the Czech Lion Awards (Czech Republic), the David di Donatello Awards (Italy), the Golden Eagle Awards (Russia), the Goya Awards (Spain), the Japan Academy Film Prize (Japan), and the Polish Film Awards (Poland).

== Accolades ==
Accolades received by The Pianist
Award	Date of ceremony	Category	Recipient(s)	Result	Ref.
Academy Awards	23 March 2003	Best Picture	Robert Benmussa, Roman Polanski and Alain Sarde	Nominated	
Academy Awards	23 March 2003	Best Director	Roman Polanski	Won	
Academy Awards	23 March 2003	Best Actor	Adrien Brody	Won	
Academy Awards	23 March 2003	Best Adapted Screenplay	Ronald Harwood	Won	
Academy Awards	23 March 2003	Best Cinematography	Paweł Edelman	Nominated	
Academy Awards	23 March 2003	Best Costume Design	Anna B. Sheppard	Nominated	
Academy Awards	23 March 2003	Best Film Editing	Hervé de Luze	Nominated	
AARP Movies for Grownups Awards	11 March 2003	Best Director	Roman Polanski	Won	
AARP Movies for Grownups Awards	11 March 2003	Best Screenwriter	Ronald Harwood	Nominated	
American Screenwriters Association Awards	2003	Discover Screenwriting Award	Ronald Harwood	Nominated	
American Society of Cinematographers Awards	16 February 2003	Best Cinematography	Paweł Edelman	Nominated	
Argentine Film Critics Association Awards	5 May 2004	Silver Condor Award for Best Foreign Film	Roman Polanski	Nominated	
Boston Society of Film Critics Awards	15 December 2002	Best Film	The Pianist	Won	
Boston Society of Film Critics Awards	15 December 2002	Best Director	Roman Polanski	Won	
Boston Society of Film Critics Awards	15 December 2002	Best Actor	Adrien Brody	Won	
British Academy Film Awards	23 February 2003	Best Film	Robert Benmussa, Roman Polanski and Alain Sarde	Won	
British Academy Film Awards	23 February 2003	Best Direction	Roman Polanski	Won	
British Academy Film Awards	23 February 2003	Best Actor in a Leading Role	Adrien Brody	Nominated	
British Academy Film Awards	23 February 2003	Best Adapted Screenplay	Ronald Harwood	Nominated	
British Academy Film Awards	23 February 2003	Best Cinematography	Paweł Edelman	Nominated	
British Academy Film Awards	23 February 2003	Best Original Music	Wojciech Kilar	Nominated	
British Academy Film Awards	23 February 2003	Best Sound	Jean-Marie Blondel, Gerard Hardy and Dean Humphreys	Nominated	
British Society of Cinematographers Awards	2002	Best Cinematography	Paweł Edelman	Nominated	
Cannes Film Festival Awards	26 May 2002	Palme d'Or	Roman Polanski	Won	
César Awards	22 February 2003	Best Film	Roman Polanski	Won	
César Awards	22 February 2003	Best Director	Roman Polanski	Won	
César Awards	22 February 2003	Best Actor	Adrien Brody	Won	
César Awards	22 February 2003	Best Original Screenplay or Adaptation	Ronald Harwood	Nominated	
César Awards	22 February 2003	Best Cinematography	Paweł Edelman	Won	
César Awards	22 February 2003	Best Costume Design	Anna B. Sheppard	Nominated	
César Awards	22 February 2003	Best Editing	Hervé de Luze	Nominated	
César Awards	22 February 2003	Best Music	Wojciech Kilar	Won	
César Awards	22 February 2003	Best Production Design	Allan Starski	Won	
César Awards	22 February 2003	Best Sound	Jean-Marie Blondel, Gerard Hardy and Dean Humphreys	Won	
Chicago Film Critics Association Awards	8 January 2003	Best Film	The Pianist	Nominated	
Chicago Film Critics Association Awards	8 January 2003	Best Director	Roman Polanski	Nominated	
Chicago Film Critics Association Awards	8 January 2003	Best Actor	Adrien Brody	Nominated	
CEC Awards	27 January 2003	Best Foreign Film	Roman Polanski	Won	
Critics' Choice Movie Awards	17 January 2003	Best Picture	The Pianist	Nominated	
Critics' Choice Movie Awards	17 January 2003	Best Director	Roman Polanski	Nominated	
Czech Lion Awards	8 March 2004	Best Foreign Film	Roman Polanski	Won	
Dallas–Fort Worth Film Critics Association Awards	6 January 2003	Best Film	The Pianist	Nominated	
Dallas–Fort Worth Film Critics Association Awards	6 January 2003	Best Director	Roman Polanski	Nominated	
Dallas–Fort Worth Film Critics Association Awards	6 January 2003	Best Actor	Adrien Brody	Nominated	
David di Donatello Awards	9 April 2003	Best Foreign Film	Roman Polanski	Won	
Directors Guild of America Awards	1 March 2003	Outstanding Directing in a Feature Film	Roman Polanski	Nominated	
European Film Awards	7 December 2002	Best Film	Roman Polanski	Nominated	
European Film Awards	7 December 2002	Best Director	Roman Polanski	Nominated	
European Film Awards	7 December 2002	Best Cinematographer	Paweł Edelman	Won	
European Film Awards	7 December 2002	Jameson People's Choice Award for Best Actor	Adrien Brody	Nominated	
Fotogramas de Plata Awards	3 March 2003	Best Foreign Film	Roman Polanski	Won	
Fryderyk	1 April 2003	Album of the Year – Solo Music	Janusz Olejniczak	Nominated	
Golden Eagle Awards	31 January 2004	Best Foreign Language Film	Roman Polanski	Won	
Golden Globe Awards	19 January 2003	Best Motion Picture – Drama	The Pianist	Nominated	
Golden Globe Awards	19 January 2003	Best Actor in a Motion Picture – Drama	Adrien Brody	Nominated	
Golden Reel Awards	22 March 2003	Best Sound Editing in a Feature Film – Musical	Suzana Peric	Nominated	
Golden Reel Awards	22 March 2003	Best Sound Editing in Foreign Features	Katia Boutin, Paul Conway and Gerard Hardy	Nominated	
Golden Trailer Awards	13 March 2003	Best Drama Trailer	The Pianist	Nominated	
Golden Trailer Awards	13 March 2003	Best Foreign Trailer	The Pianist	Nominated	
Golden Trailer Awards	13 March 2003	Best of Show	The Pianist	Nominated	
Goya Awards	1 February 2003	Best European Film	Roman Polanski	Won	
Globo d'Oro Awards	2 July 2003	Best European Film	Roman Polanski	Won	
Grande Prêmio do Cinema Brasileiro	8 September 2004	Best Foreign Film	The Pianist	Nominated	
Humanitas Prize	10 July 2003	Feature Film	Ronald Harwood	Nominated	
Japan Academy Film Prize	20 February 2004	Outstanding Foreign Language Film	The Pianist	Won	
Kinema Junpo Awards	2004	Best Foreign Language Film	The Pianist	Won	
Kinema Junpo Awards	2004	Best Foreign Director – Readers' Choice	Roman Polanski	Won	
Mainichi Film Awards	2004	Best Foreign Film	The Pianist	Won	
Mainichi Film Awards	2004	Best Foreign Film – Readers' Choice	The Pianist	Won	
Nastro d'Argento Awards	14 June 2003	Best Foreign Director	Roman Polanski	Won	
National Board of Review Awards	4 December 2002	Top Ten Films	The Pianist	Placed	
National Society of Film Critics Awards	4 January 2003	Best Film	The Pianist	Won	
National Society of Film Critics Awards	4 January 2003	Best Director	Roman Polanski	Won	
National Society of Film Critics Awards	4 January 2003	Best Actor	Adrien Brody	Won	
National Society of Film Critics Awards	4 January 2003	Best Screenplay	Ronald Harwood	Won	
National Society of Film Critics Awards	4 January 2003	Best Cinematography	Paweł Edelman	Nominated	
Nikkan Sports Film Awards	2003	Best Foreign Film	The Pianist	Won	
Online Film Critics Society Awards	6 January 2003	Best Actor	Adrien Brody	Nominated	
Polish Film Awards	15 March 2003	Best Film	Roman Polanski	Won	
Polish Film Awards	15 March 2003	Best Director	Roman Polanski	Won	
Polish Film Awards	15 March 2003	Best Actor	Adrien Brody	Nominated	
Polish Film Awards	15 March 2003	Best Actress	Emilia Fox	Nominated	
Polish Film Awards	15 March 2003	Best Supporting Actor	Ed Stoppard	Nominated	
Polish Film Awards	15 March 2003	Best Supporting Actress	Maureen Lipman	Nominated	
Polish Film Awards	15 March 2003	Best Screenplay	Ronald Harwood	Nominated	
Polish Film Awards	15 March 2003	Best Cinematography	Paweł Edelman	Won	
Polish Film Awards	15 March 2003	Best Costume Design	Anna B. Sheppard	Won	
Polish Film Awards	15 March 2003	Best Editing	Hervé de Luze	Won	
Polish Film Awards	15 March 2003	Best Film Score	Wojciech Kilar	Won	
Polish Film Awards	15 March 2003	Best Production Design	Allan Starski	Won	
Polish Film Awards	15 March 2003	Best Sound	Jean-Marie Blondel	Won	
Russian Guild of Film Critics Awards	2003	Best Foreign Film	Roman Polanski	Nominated	
Russian Guild of Film Critics Awards	2003	Best Foreign Actor	Adrien Brody	Nominated	
San Francisco Bay Area Film Critics Circle Awards	17 December 2002	Best Film	The Pianist	Won	
Sant Jordi Awards	22 April 2003	Audience Award for Best Foreign Film	Roman Polanski	Won	
Satellite Awards	12 January 2003	Best Adapted Screenplay	Ronald Harwood	Nominated	
Screen Actors Guild Awards	9 March 2003	Outstanding Performance by a Male Actor in a Leading Role	Adrien Brody	Nominated	
USC Scripter Awards	22 January 2003	Best Realization of a Book Adapted to Film	Ronald Harwood	Nominated	
Vancouver Film Critics Circle Awards	30 January 2003	Best Director	Roman Polanski	Nominated	
Vancouver Film Critics Circle Awards	30 January 2003	Best Actor	Adrien Brody	Nominated	
