= Asya Voloshina =

Russian playwright

Esther Bol, an alias of Asya Voloshina (Ася Волошина), is a Russian playwright. She took the name Esther Bol in 2022, after leaving Russia in a protest against the Russian invasion of Ukraine.

== Selected works ==
- 2022: Crime, play

Finished in 6 months after the start of the Russian invasion of Ukraine

- 2019, the first staging in 2020: Дания тюрьма [Denmark's a Prison]

The title is a line of Hamlet from Hamlet
The play is a dialog of "He" and "She" in a prison visiting area. She came to visit her father and He was let out to see his mother.

- 2016: Mama, play

For this play, Czech actress Tereza Dočkalová won her third Thalia Award

- 2012: Agrippina, a Russian staging as opera-drama of the opera Agrippina by Handel

== Awards ==
- 2022: Golden Mask nomination of Denmark's a Prison in five categories, but the play was cancelled in an act of censorship.
