= Jaroslav Čejka =

Czech dancer, mime and actor (1936–2022)

- Born: 22 July 1936; Ostrava, Czechoslovakia
- Died: 11 October 2022 (aged 86); Prague, Czech Republic

Jaroslav Čejka (22 July 1936 – 11 October 2022) was a Czech dancer, mime, comedian and actor.

== Life and career ==
Born in Ostrava, Čejka began his career as a dancer at 17 years old, and starting from the 1960s he was a member of the National Theatre Ballet. He later became popular thanks to television, performing as a mime in comical sketches; his best known performance was the imitation of the hen, that he performed for the first time in a 1977 New Year's Eve TV special. He was also active as a comedy film actor, starring in about two dozen films.

In 2007 Čejka received a Thalia Award for his career. In his later years he lived in a retirement home. Affected by Parkinson's and Alzheimer's diseases, he died on 11 October 2022, at the age of 86.
