= Četníci z Luhačovic =

- Starring: Pavel Zedníček; Robert Hájek; Martin Donutil
- Country of origin: Czech Republic
- Original language: Czech
- No. of seasons: 1
- No. of episodes: 12

Production
- Running time: 85 minutes

Original release
- Network: Czech Television
- Release: 2017 – 2017

Related
- Četnické humoresky

Četníci z Luhačovic (Policemen of Luhačovice) is a Czech crime television series. Its creative producer was Jan Maxa, the author of the project and main scriptwriter Petr Bok, Tomáš Feřtek also participated in the scripts. Directed by Biser A. Arichtev, Peter Bebjak and Dan Wlodarczyk. The plot of the series takes place in 1919. The central pair of young First Republic policemen were portrayed by Robert Hájek and Martin Donutil. The premiere of the first part took place on 6 January 2017.

The series loosely followed on from the successful series Četnické humoresky. However creative producer of the Czech Television, David Ziegelbauer stated it is a separate project, which is related to the humorous series only by its setting.

Czech Television originally planned second season called Četníci ze Znojma (Policemen of Znojmo) to release in 2021 which would see protagonists to relocate to Znojmo but it was cancelled due to lack of finances. Situation changed in 2023 when Jan Souček (director of Brno studio which is responsible for the series) was elected new Director-General of Czech Television stated that he wants to revive the series.

== Cast ==
- Pavel Zedníček as Hans Gebert, Sergeant who becomes fourth commander of the police station in Luhačovice
- Robert Hájek as corporal Martin Láska, a probationary policeman, grew up in the village
- Martin Donutil as corporal Zdeněk Cmíral, probationary gendarmerie and son of a regional judge
- Ondřej Malý as municipal constable Josef Hejkal, Stána's father
- Pavla Tomicová as housekeeper Růžena Hejkalová, Josef's wife and Stána's mother
- Dana Batulková as Hortenzie Cmíralová, Zdenek's mother and wife of the regional judge Cmíral
- Igor Bareš as district judge Oldřich Janota
- Robert Jašków as 1st class warden Václav Stavinoha, the first post-war commander of the police station in Luhačovice
- Karel Dobry as 1st Class Guardsman Radomír "Radek" Vlach, war veteran and member of the Italian legions, second commander of the police station in Luhačovice
- Jiří Langmajer as chief constable Arnošt Sova, third commander of the police station in Luhačovice
- Marek Holý as 1st class constable Hynek Polívka, police constable to help in Luhačovice
