= Štěpánka Ranošová =

Czech actress (1926–2026)

- Born: 14 October 1926; Ostrava, Czechoslovakia
- Died: 1 October 2026 (aged 99); Ostrava, Czech Republic
- Occupation: Actress
- Years active: 1945–1997

Štěpánka Ranošová (14 October 1926 – 1 October 2026) was a Czech actress. She was one of the founding members of the Petr Bezruč Theatre in Ostrava.

== Life and career ==
Ranošová was born in Mariánské Hory part of Ostrava on 14 October 1926, and studied acting privately with Anna Kratochvílová. Together with director and playwright Oldřich Daněk, artist Otakar Schindler and others, she formed the student ensemble Kytice in 1945, which presented a recitation of Czech poetry, Bread with Steel, in the former hall of the puppet theatre on the square Masarykovo náměstí. Subsequently, on 1 December 1945, they founded the Youth Theatre, of which she was a member. In 1947, she moved to the Beskydy Theatre in Nový Jičín for one year, from where she returned to the Youth Theatre, which was renamed the Petr Bezruč Theatre (after Petr Bezruč) in 1955.

She played a number of roles, such as Stella in A Streetcar Named Desire, Doctor von Zahnd in Physics, Lady Torrance in The Descent of Orpheus, the widow Gurmyžská in Ostrovského Les, Mrs. Dulská in The Morality of Mrs. Dulska or the title role in Mother Courage. She appeared most often in the roles of village women, such as Hanička in Lucerna, Kačenka in Jiřík's Vision, Dorotka and Rosava in Strakonický dudákov, Jahelková in Tvrdohlává žena, Lízalka in Maryše, Marijána Plajznerová in Dalskabáty, or Kostelnička in Jenůfa. She was a permanent member of the Petr Bezruč Theatre until 1987. She later guest-starred in the drama of the National Moravian-Silesian Theatre. She first played the role of the miller's grandmother in Lucerna in 1998, followed by the production of Love and Magic in Mom's Kitchen, and her last role was the nanny Anfisa in Three Sisters in 2001.

In addition to theatre, Ranošová acted in series and films. Her first debut was in the television film Apolo z Belacu from 1964. In series, she often portrayed the roles of strong and uncompromising women, such as in Dispatcher , Stone Order , Without Women and Without Tobacco, or Stavy rachotí. She also collaborated with Ostrava Radio.

Ranošová died on 1 October 2026, aged 99.

== Awards ==
Ranošová was the recipient of numerous awards. She received the honorary title of Meritorious Artist and in 1985 the President awarded her the Order of Labour. For her work, she received the Senior Prix award from the Život umělce Foundation in 1996, and in 2024 she received the Ostrava City Award from the Mayor Jan Dohnal. For her lifetime of work, she received the Thalia Award for Lifetime Mastery in the Field of Drama in 2024.
