= Nikola Márová =

Czech ballerina

Nikola Márová (born June 24, 1980) is a Czech ballerina. Since 2006, she has been a principal dancer at the National Theatre in Prague.

Her role as Odette/Odile in Swan Lake earned her a Thalia Award in 2008. She is married to Alexander Katsapov, also a principal dancer at the National Theatre, and has a son.
