= David Drábek =

Czech playwright and theatre director

David Drábek (born 18 July 1970) is a Czech playwright and theatre director. He repeatedly received the Alfred Radok Award for his works.

== Biography ==
He studied at the film faculty of the Palacký University in Olomouc. While studying at the university he founded the theatre company "Giraffes on Fire" along with his friend, composer Darek Král. David Drábek wrote and directed plays himself. From 1996 to 2001, he worked as a playwright in an Olomouc theatre. From 2001 to 2003 he led a new alternative scene called "House on Fire". He worked as an author and director in Prague's theatre Minor and cooperated with other Czech theatres.

Since January 2009 he has been the artistic director of the Klicpera's Theater in Hradec Králové. David Drábek became famous after 1989. In his plays he criticises society and condemns the so-called "Czech mentality", especially materialism and consumerism. His work is full of satire and it describes contemporary Czech society. Main characters are anti-heroes, they have their issues and try to deal with them and with society. They usually suffer from phobias and deviation. Elements of surrealism could be found in his work. Almost every character is a victim of rotten society. Drábek tries to capture people's lives as such. Episodic storytelling is mainly used in his plays.

== Plays ==
- Malá žranice, 1992 [Small Grub] (in cooperation with Darek Král)
- Hořící žirafy, 1993 [Giraffes on Fire]
- Jana z parku, 1994 [Jana from Park]
- Švédský stůl, 1998 [Buffet]
- Kostlivec v silonkách, 1999 [Skeleton in Nylons]
- Kuřáci opia, 2000 [Opium Smokers]
- Kostlivec: Vzkříšení, 2002 [Skeleton: Resurrection]
- Akvabely, 2003 [Aquabelles]
- Sněhurka - Nová generace, 2004 [Snow White: New Generation]
- Čtyřlístek!, 2004 (in cooperation with Petra Zámečníková) [Cloverleaf]
- Děvčátko s mozkem, 2005 [Little Girl with Brain]
- Ještěři, 2006 [Lizards]
- Náměstí bratří Mašínů, 2007
- Berta (From Dusk till Dawn), 2008
- Unisex, 2009
- Noc oživlých mrtvol, 2010 [The night of living dead]
- Tvrdě / Měkce, 2010 (in cooperation with Martin Františák) [Roughly/Softly]
- Jedlíci čokolády, 2011 [Chocolate Houses]

== Radio plays ==
- Vykřičené domy, 2007 [Disreputable houses]
- Koule, 2011 [The Shot]

== Awards ==
- Jana z parku - 1. place in dramatic competition Alfréd Radok’s award 1994
- Akvabely - 2005 Alfréd Radok Award for the best Czech play
- Náměstí bratří Mašínů - 2. place in dramatic competition Alfréd Radok’s award 2007 and later was awarded Czech play 2009
- Noc oživlých mrtvol – Czech play 2010 award
- Jedlíci čokolády – Czech play 2011 award
- Vykřičené domy - Prix Bohemia Radio award 2008
