= Vlasta Pavelcová =

Czech ballerina (1931–2026)

- Born: 14 August 1931; Ostrava, Czechoslovakia
- Died: 26 July 2026 (aged 94); Ostrava, Czech Republic
- Occupations: Ballet dancer, ballet master
- Years active: 1946–1976
- Organization: National Moravian-Silesian Theatre
- Known for: Leading soloist in Ostrava ballet
- Awards: Vyznamenání Za vynikající práci (1959); Zasloužilý umělec (1972); Thalia Award for Lifetime Achievement (2002)

Vlasta Pavelcová (14 August 1931 – 26 July 2026) was a Czech ballet dancer and master. During her career, she worked with the State Theatre in Ostrava, she was regarded as one of the greatest Czech ballet soloists of her time. She portrayed major classical and dramatic roles including Odette in Swan Lake, Juliet in Romeo and Juliet, and the title role in Giselle and was honoured with the Thalia Award for lifetime achievement in 2002.

== Life and career ==
Vlasta Pavelcová was born in Vítkovice district of Ostrava, Czechoslovakia, on 14 August 1931. At the age of fifteen, she began studying ballet with Emerich Gabzdyl and joined the National Moravian-Silesian Theatre as an apprentice in 1946. She got her first role as Odette in Swan Lake in 1950 at the age of nineteen. She also acted as Svanilda in Coppélia, Desdemona in Othello, and the title roles in Romeo and Juliet, Giselle, Viktorka, and Maryčka Magdónova. Her acting in Richard Strauss's The Legend of Joseph earned her an award at the World Festival of Youth and Students in Vienna in 1959. Pavelcová retired in 1976, but continued to work as a ballet dancer and master. She received Thalia Awards for Lifetime Achievement in 2002.

Pavelcová died in Ostrava on 26 July 2026, at the age of 94.
