= Klaudia Dernerová =

Slovak singer

- Born: 21 June 1971 (age 54); Prešov, Czechoslovakia
- Occupation: Opera singer
- Years active: 1995-present

Klaudia Dernerová (born 21 June 1971) is a Slovak opera soprano and Alfréd Radok Award winner.

She received the Alfréd Radok Award for Best Actress in 2000 for her portrayal of the title role in a Czech production of the Dmitri Shostakovich play Lady Macbeth of the Mtsensk District at the National Theatre in Prague. At the 2000 Thalia Awards she won the category of Best Female Performance in an Opera for the same work.

She took part in the BBC Cardiff Singer of the World competition in 2001, becoming the first contestant from her native Slovakia to compete.
