= Tereza Dočkalová =

Czech actress (born 1988)

- Tereza Dočkalová, 2018
- Born: 21 April 1988 (age 38); Nový Jičín, Czechoslovakia
- Occupation: Actress

Tereza Dočkalová (born 1988) is a Czech film and stage actress.

== Awards ==
- Thalia Awards - she was the first actor to win three Thalia awards.
  - For 2011: in the category of actors under 33
  - For 2017: for her role of Nora in the production of Nora (A Doll's House)
  - For 2025: for her role of Olja in the play Máma (by Esther Bol, a Russian playwright) staged at the Divadlo pod Palmovkou theatre
