= Alfréd Radok Awards =

Former Czech theatre awards

- Awarded for: Achievement in Czech theatre
- Sponsored by: Aura–Pont; Svět a Divadlo
- Country: Czech Republic
- Presented by: Nadace Alfréda Radoka
- First award: 1992
- Final award: 2013
- Website: http://www.cenyradoka.cz/

The Alfréd Radok Awards (Ceny Alfréda Radoka) were presented annually by the Endowment for the Alfréd Radok Awards in collaboration with the theatre and literary agency Aura-Pont and the magazine Svět a Divadlo (The World and Theatre) for achievements in Czech theatre, starting in 1992. The category of Best Performance was the first created. In 1995, the categories Best Play, Best Stage Design, Talent of the Year, Theatre of the Year, Best Actor, and Best Actress were created. The winners were selected by vote by theatre critics. 2013 was the last year the award ceremony was held. It was followed in 2014 by the Ceny divadelní kritiky (Theater Critics Awards), awarded by Svět a Divadlo for staging categories, and Anonymní dramatická soutěž agentury Aura-Pont (Anonymous drama competition of Aura-Pont agency).

Winners in the principal categories were as follows:

== Best Actor ==
- 1995 – Tomáš Töpfer for Jacobowski in Jacobowski and the Colonel
- 1996 – Jiří Ornest for Ludwig in Ritter, Dene, Voss
- 1997 – Miroslav Táborský for Jindřich in Konec masopustu
- 1998 – Karel Roden for Bruno in Le Cocu Magnifique
- 1999 – Martin Huba for Bruscon in Der Theatermacher
- 2000 – Jan Potměšil for Richard III in Richard III
- 2001 – David Prachař for Faust in Tragická historie o doktoru Faustovi
- 2002 – Jan Tříska for Lear in King Lear
- 2003 – Michal Čapka for Šaryk in Heart of a Dog
- 2004 – Boris Rösner for Harpagon in The Miser
- 2005 – Jan Vondráček for Lelio in The Liar
- 2006 – Martin Finger for Světanápravce in Světanápravce (Der Weltvebesserer)
- 2007 – Erik Pardus for Pavel I. in Smrt Pavla I.
- 2007 – Jaroslav Plesl for Christy Mahon in The Playboy of the Western World
- 2007 – Martin Finger for Josef K. in Proces
- 2008 – Jaromír Dulava for Předseda in Ptákovina
- 2009 – Martin Pechlát for Goebbels in Goebbels/Baarová
- 2010 – David Novotný for Muž in Muž bez minulosti
- 2011 – Martin Pechlát for Andreas Karták in Legenda o svatém pijanovi
- 2012 – Ivan Trojan for Bůh in Ucpanej systém
- 2013 – Karel Dobrý for Opričník Andrej Danilovič in Den opričníka

== Best Actress ==
- 1994 – Barbora Hrzánová in The Seagull
- 1995 – Ivana Hloužková for Maryša in Maryša
- 1996 – Emília Vášáryová for The Younger Sister in Ritter, Dene, Voss
- 1997 – Lucie Trmíková for Terezka in Terezka
- 1998 – Iva Janžurová for Winnie in Happy Days
- 1999 – Pavla Tomicová for Maryša in Maryša - po pravdě však Mařka
- 2000 – Klaudia Dernerová for Katěrina Izmajlova in Lady Macbeth Mcenského újezdu
- 2001 – Marie Málková for Madelaine in La Terrasse
- 2002 – Marie Málková for Ms. Stavrogin in The Devils
- 2003 – Marie Málková for Ms. Zittel in Heldenplatz
- 2004 – Daniela Kolářová for The Mother in Am Ziel
- 2005 – Jaroslava Pokorná for Hedvik in The Wild Duck
- 2006 – Kate Aldrich for Sesto in La clemenza di Tito
- 2007 – Helena Dvořáková for Faidra in Faidra
- 2008 – Soňa Červená in Zítra se bude...
- 2009 – Kateřina Burianová for Violet Westonová in Srpen v zemi indiánů
- 2010 – Ivana Uhlířová for Alžběta in Víra, láska, naděje
- 2011 – Helena Dvořáková for Ysé in Polední úděl
- 2012 – Ivana Hloužková for Miroslav Tichý in Tichý Tarzan
- 2013 – Tereza Vilišová for Amy in Můj romantický příběh

== Best Play ==
- 1995 – Sestra Úzkost by Pitínský, Čep and Deml
- 1996 – Ritter, Dene, Voss by Thomas Bernhard
- 1997 – Terezka by Lenka Lagronová
- 1998 – Arcadia by Tom Stoppard
- 1999 – Jeminkote, psohlavci by Iva Peřinová
- 2000 – Faust Is Dead by Mark Ravenhill
- 2001 – Tales of Common Insanity by Petr Zelenka
- 2002 – The Lonesome West by Martin McDonagh
- 2003 – The Lieutenant of Inishmore by Martin McDonagh
- 2004 – Nagano by Martin Smolka and Jaroslav Dušek
- 2005 – Akvabely by David Drábek
- 2006 – Má vlast by Iva Klestilová
- 2007 – Zázrak v černém domě by Milan Uhde
- 2008 – Odcházení by Václav Havel
- 2009 – Náměstí bratří Mašínů by David Drábek
- 2010 – Očištění by Petr Zelenka
- 2011 – Jedlíci čokolády by David Drábek
- 2012 – Brian by Miroslav Krobot
- 2013 – Plejtvák by Milan Šotek

== New Artist ==
- 1995 – Zuzana Stivínová (actress)
- 1996 – Martin Dohnal (composer)
- 1997 – Petra Špalková (actress)
- 1998 – Petr Krušelnický (mime artist)
- 1999 – Martin Čičvák (director)
- 2000 – Richard Krajčo (actor)
- 2001 – Miroslav Krobot (actor) /though he is a director/
- 2002 – Ondřej Sokol (actor and director)
- 2003 – Lucie Žáčková (actress)
- 2004 – Magdaléna Borová (actress)
- 2005 – Gabriela Vermelho
- 2006 – Ivana Uhlířová (actress)
- 2007 – Jiří Havelka (director)
- 2008 – Štěpán Pácl (director)
- 2009 – Vojtěch Dyk (actor)
- 2010 – Štěpán Pácl (director)
- 2011 – Michal Isteník (actor)
- 2012 – Braňo Holiček (director, actor)
- 2013 – Patrik Děrgel (actor)
