= Ivana Hloužková =

Czech actress (1960–2023)

- Born: 6 June 1960; Valtice, Czechoslovakia
- Died: 6 March 2023 (aged 62)
- Occupation: Actress
- Years active: 1981–2023

Ivana Hloužková (Czech pronunciation: [ˈɪvana ˈɦlou̯ʃkovaː]; 6 June 1960 – 6 March 2023) was a Czech actress and two-time Alfréd Radok Award winner. She was a member of the Goose on a String Theatre in Brno from 1981.

Hloužková won her first Alfréd Radok Award for Best Actress in 1995 for her portrayal of the title role in the play Maryša at the Goose on a String Theatre in Brno. In 2012 she was again named Best Actress at the same award ceremony for her role of Miroslav Tichý in the play Tichý Tarzan, again at the Goose on a String Theatre. Although she was principally a stage actress, she acted in films including The Fortress (1994) and Boredom in Brno (2003).

Hloužková died on 6 March 2023, at the age of 62.
