= Četnické humoresky =

Czech crime television series

- DVD box art
- Also known as: Cops and Robbers
- Genre: Crime, Comedy
- Written by: Antonín Moskalyk, Pavlína Moskalyková, Petr Zikmund, Drahoslav Makovička, Miloš Fedaš, Jan Otčenášek, Hana Slavíková, Josef Souchop
- Directed by: Antonín Moskalyk, Pavlína Moskalyková
- Starring: Tomáš Töpfer, Ivan Trojan, Petr Kostka
- Country of origin: Czech Republic
- Original language: Czech
- No. of seasons: 3
- No. of episodes: 39

Production
- Running time: 90 minutes

Original release
- Network: Czech Television
- Release: 2001 – 2007

Related
- Četníci z Luhačovic

Četnické humoresky is a Czech crime television series about a gendarmerie investigative unit, stationed in the city of Brno. The story is set in the period of interbellic First Czechoslovak Republic and combines elements of crime drama and comedy. The stories are based on real case files from that era.

The series was directed by Antonín Moskalyk and later by his daughter Pavlína Moskalyková Solo. One of the goals of the series producers and showrunners was to show the life of Czechoslovak gendarmes. The series is not entirely focused on law enforcement and criminal investigations; it also shows private lives of the gendarmerie officers. The series ran for 3 seasons, totaling 39 episodes.

== Plot ==
The series deals with fates of gendarmes of Brno gendarmerie station in 1930s as they solve serious and comical cases. The series follows Senior Sergeant and later Chief constable Karel Arazím who gets a newbie Jarý under his wing who becomes his right-hand man and eventually marries his daughter Klaudie.

The plot of the series ends before the start of World War II, when Arazím's wife Ludmila with her children, Arazím's daughter Klaudie with her baby, Kamila Kliková, Elly Vienna and McGregor fly to England. Originally, Jarý was also supposed to fly, but he decided not to leave the members of the search party alone and jumped out of the plane before it even left the ground. All gendarmes, including Arazim, remain on duty in Brno despite incoming occupation and war.

== Cast ==
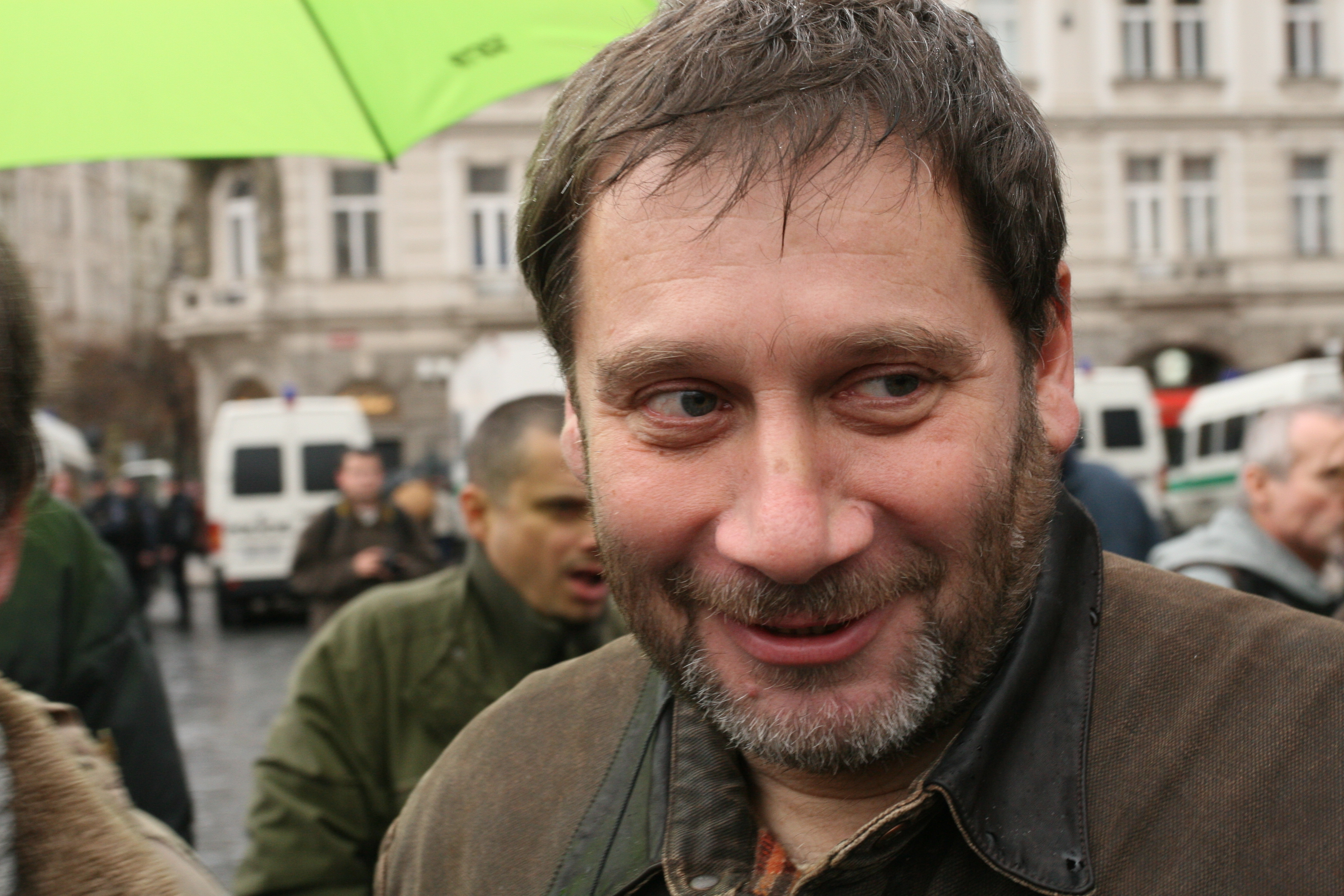
The actor Tomáš Töpfer played the character of Karel Arazím, the Senior Sergeant of the station.

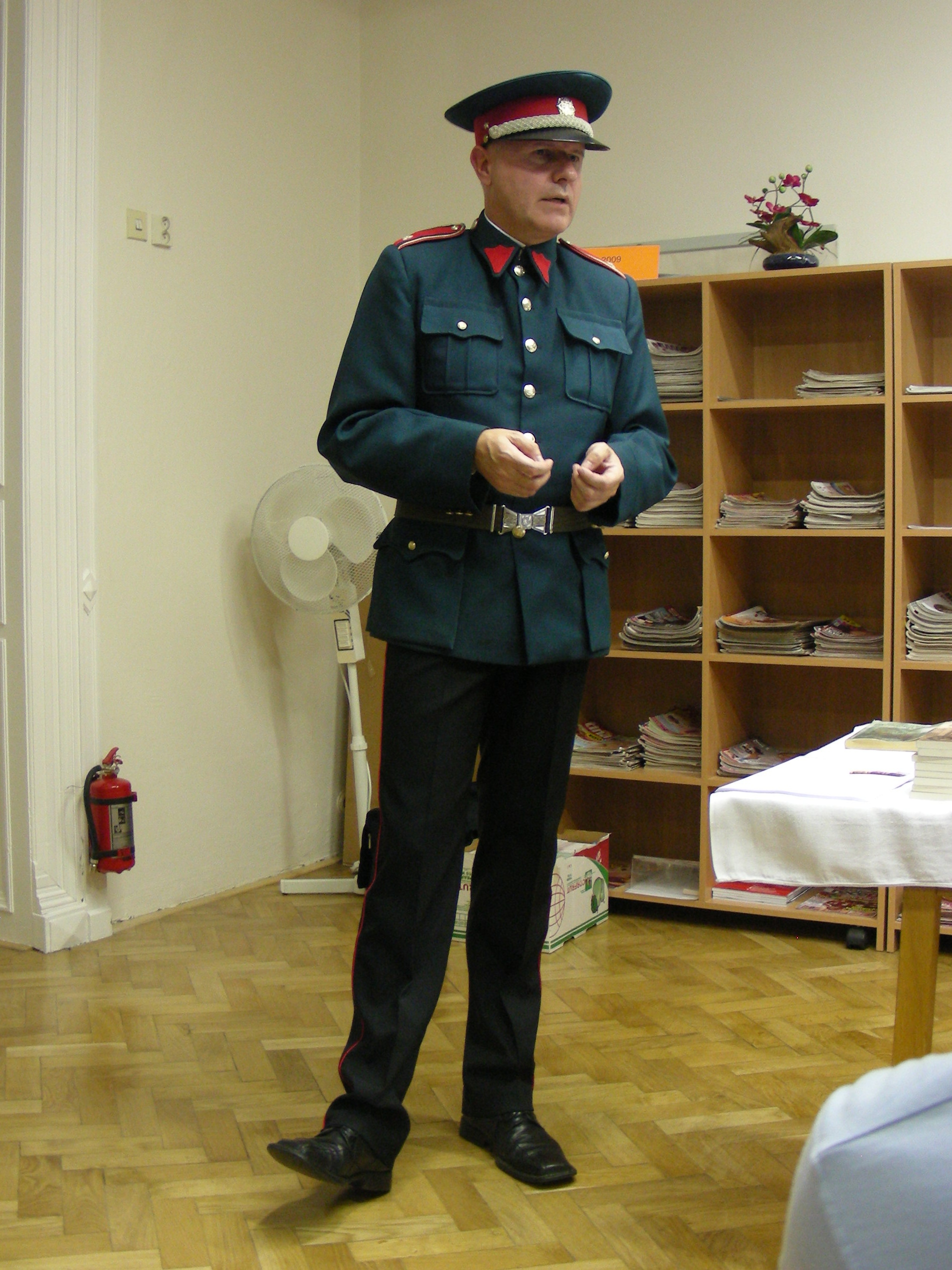
Czech military and police historian Michal Dlouhý. He co-wrote the script and gave historical advice.

- Tomáš Töpfer as Karel Arazím, the Senior Sergeant of the station, later Chief constable
- Ivan Trojan as Bedřich Jarý, Arazím's loyal right-hand man
- Zdeněk Junák as Josef Ambrož, Chief Warrant Officer
- Jan Apolenář as Václav Ryba, K-9 handler
- Oldřich Mikulášek as František Řepa, sergeant, porter
- Erik Pardus as František Zahálka, sergeant
- František Švihlík as Čeněk Němec, staff Sergeant later Warrant
- Aleš Jarý as Sláva Jiroušek, staff Sergeant, driver, later shot dead
- Stanislav Zindulka as Jan Turko, Warrant, later in retirement
- Viktor Preiss as Leopold Skrčílek, Warrant
- Petr Kostka as Jaroslav Šiktanc, Chief constable, later in retirement
- Zdena Herfortová as Vladěnka Šiktancová, wife of Chief constable Šiktanc
- Alena Antalová as Ludmila Horká, Arazím's girlfriend, later his wife
- Libuše Šafránková as Karlička Formánková, Nurse, Arazím's girlfriend
- Olga Krasko as Klaudie, Arazím's daughter, Bedřich Jarý's wife
- Tatiana Vilhelmová as Kamila Kliková, pushy and ambitious journalist
- Miroslav Donutil as Hugo Líbal, photographer and owner of photo studio
- Dana Batulková as Jindřiška Patová, seamstress and owner of fashion store, lover of Sláva Jiroušek
- Ivana Vaňková as Elly Vienna, opera singer
- Andrea Elsnerová as Anděla Rybová, Cook
- Vlasta Peterková as Božena, Cook, later wife of Čeněk Němec
- František Černín as Ondřej Formánek, Karlička's Son
- Luděk Munzar as Judr. Peřina, Karlička's Father
- Věra Galatíková as Anna Peřinová, Karlička's Mother
- Marek Vašut as Kylián Pádlo, Ministry of the Interior (Czechoslovakia)
- Carmen Mayerová as Vendula Chromáková, Housewife at Karel and Ludmila's
- Ivan G'Vera as Joseph McGregor, Ludmila's brother
- and more

== Production ==
Filming of season 1 began on 17 August 1998. Three seasons followed. Season 4 wasn't planned, as the series barracks was demolished.

== Episodes ==
Season	Episodes	Originally aired	
Season	Episodes	First aired	Last aired
1	13	24 January 2001	29 March 2001
2	13	4 April 2003	26 June 2003
3	13	31 August 2007	23 November 2007
