= Kateřina Burianová =

Czech actress (born 1946)

- Born: 30 March 1946 (age 79); Prague, Czechoslovakia
- Occupation: Actress
- Years active: 1965-present

Kateřina Burianová (born 30 March 1946) is a Czech actress. She won the Alfréd Radok Award for Best Actress in 2009 for her role of Violet Weston in the play August: Osage County at the Estates Theatre in Prague. At the 2009 Thalia Awards she won the category of Best Actress in a Play for the same work.
