= Iva Klestilová =

Czech writer and actress (born 1964)

Iva Klestilová (born 4 October 1964) is a Czech writer and actress.

== Life ==
She was born Iva Volánková in Brno and attended grammar school in Moravský Krumlov. She performed in the children's theatre at the Na Provázku Theater and was a member of the amateur ensemble Nepojízdná housenka. From 1989 to 2004, she performed at the HaDivadle. From the late 1990s, she focused more on writing than on acting.

Klestilová lectures on dramaturgy at the National Theatre in Prague.

She has written scripts for a number of Czech television series, including Ošklivka Katka, as well as screenplays for television and radio plays.

She has received the Alfréd Radok Award for Všichni svatí (1997) and for her minach trilogy of plays (2000). In 2006, she received the same award for her play Má vlast.

Her dramatic work is known for its social commentary on issues such as consumerism and the decline of social values.

She contributes to the newspapers Mladá fronta DNES, Lidové noviny and Právo.
