= Zora Šemberová =

Czech dancer, educator and choreographer

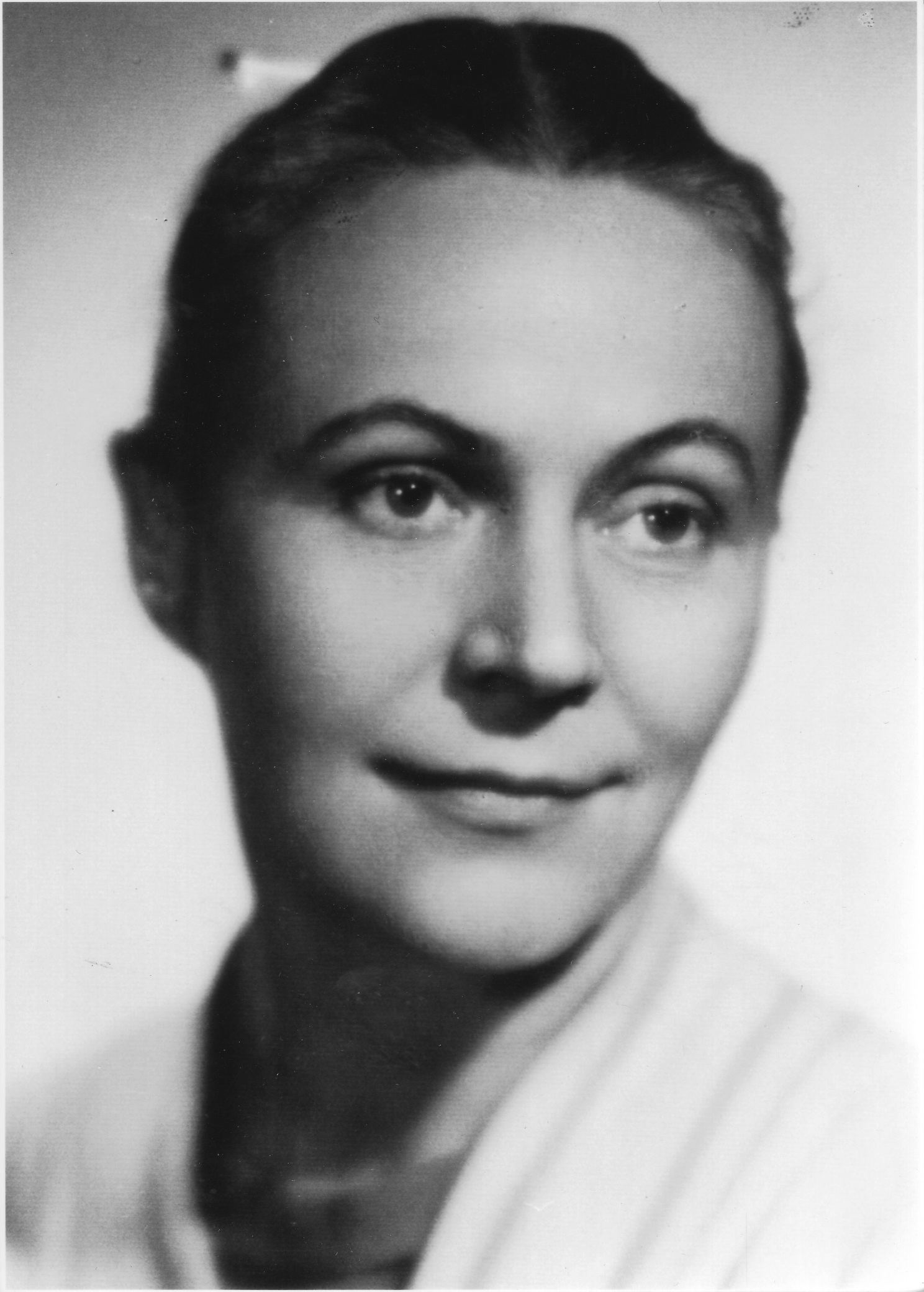
- Born: March 13, 1913; Vyškov, Austria-Hungary
- Died: October 9, 2012 (aged 99); Adelaide, Australia

Zora Šemberová (March 13, 1913 – October 9, 2012) was a Czech dancer, educator and choreographer. She was the first person to dance the role of Juliet in Sergei Prokofiev's Romeo and Juliet. She is considered one of the most important interpreters in Czech dance.

== Life ==
Šemberová was born in Vyškov, grew up in Brno and began her study of dance at the age of nine with Mme Gugenmoz and later Jaroslav Hladík. Šemberová went on to study at the schools of Olga Preobrajenska in Paris, Tatiana Gzovska in Berlin and Rosalia Chladek in Austria. She studied mime in Paris with Marcel Marceau and E. Jaroszewicz. She was also influenced by modernist Jarmila Kröschlová. Šemberová performed with the ballet group of the National Theatre in Prague from 1928 to 1930 and from 1943 to 1959. She performed at the Gaumont-Palace in Paris and was a soloist in Brno from 1932 to 1941 and at the New German Theater in Prague for the 1942/43 season.

She taught at the Prague Conservatory and at the Academy of Performing Arts in Prague. In 1968, she moved to Australia to teach at Flinders University. After the Warsaw Pact invasion of Czechoslovakia, she decided to remain in Australia. She taught at the University of Adelaide and founded a mime company, the Australian Mime Theatre. She returned to the Czech Republic several times after 1989. Šemberová received a Thalia Award in 1999 and a Gratias Agit Award in 2005.

She married Dr. Vaclav Holub, a surgeon; the marriage later ended in divorce.

She helped develop and inspire Czech dancers such as Pavel Šmok, Ladislav Fialka, Jiří Kylián and Vlastimil Harapes. She also taught Australian entertainers such as Scott Hicks and his wife Kerry Heysen, Greig Pickhaver, Christian Manon and Gale Edwards.

She died in Adelaide at the age of 99.
