= Blanka Bohdanová =

Czech painter and artist (1930–2021)

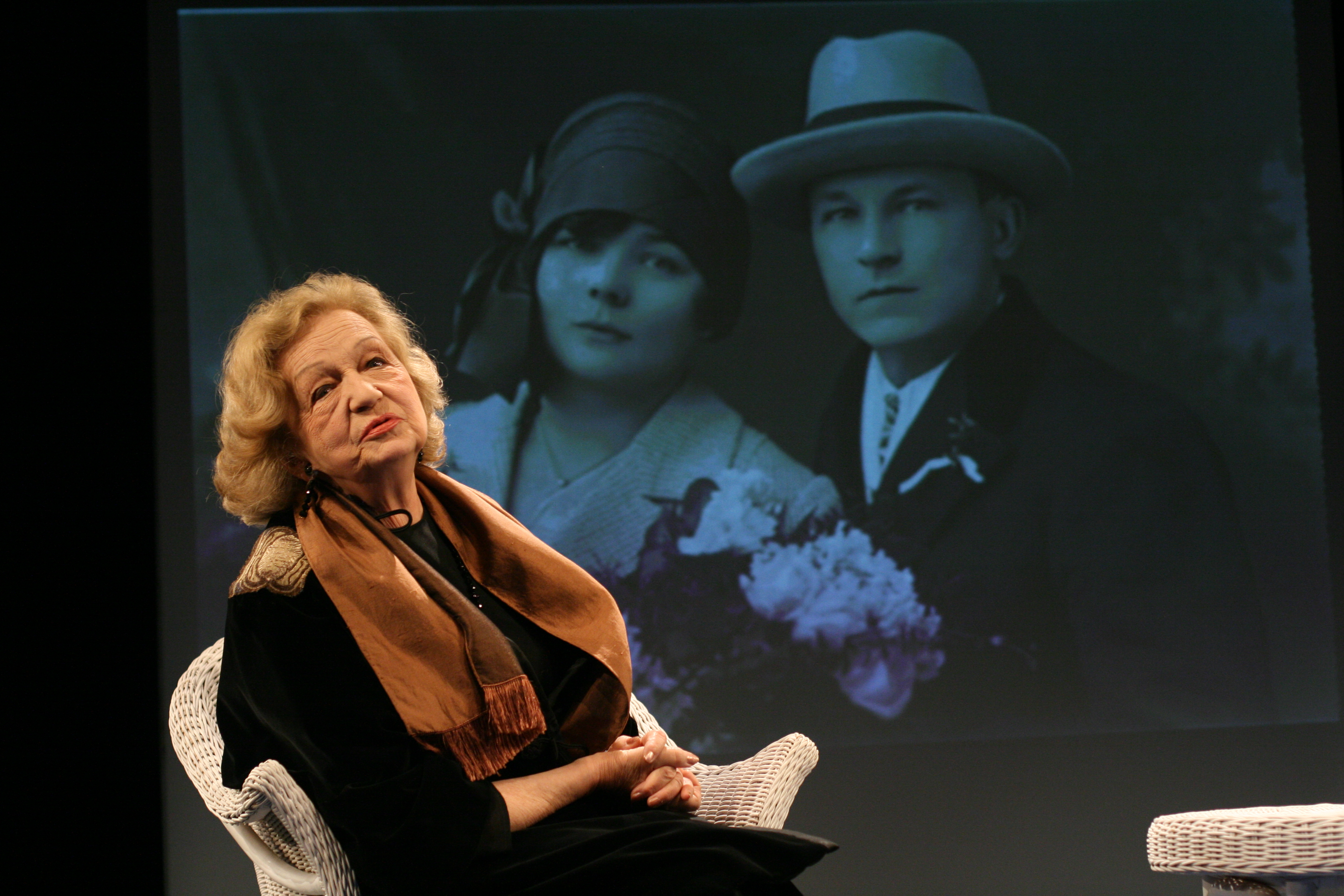
- Bohdanová in 2008
- Born: 4 March 1930; Plzeň, Czechoslovakia
- Died: 3 October 2021 (aged 91); Prague, Czech Republic
- Occupation: Actress
- Years active: 1958–2021

Signature
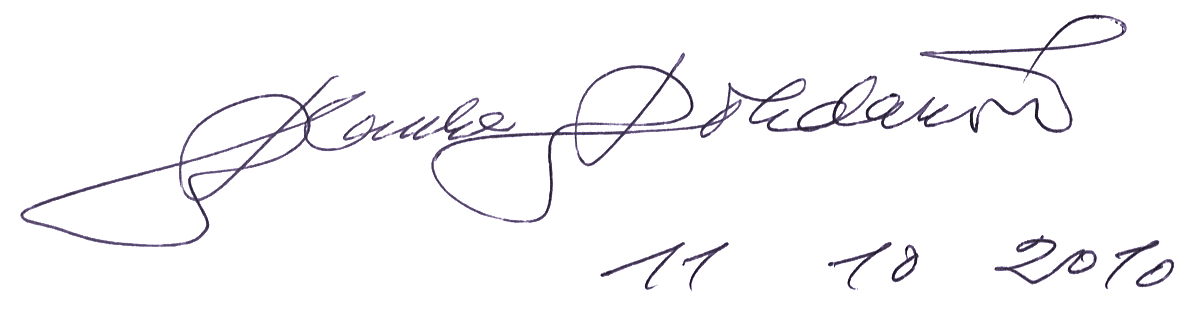

Blanka Bohdanová (4 March 1930 – 3 October 2021) was a Czech film, stage and television actress, who performed over 80 roles at the National Theatre in Prague over a period of more than 50 years. Her best known movie roles were in Romeo, Juliet and Darkness, Když rozvod, tak rozvod and Thirty Cases of Major Zeman. At the 2001 Thalia Awards she won the category of Best Actress in a Play, for her performance in a Czech rendition of Donald L. Coburn's play The Gin Game at Viola Theatre. She received a lifetime achievement award at the Thalia Awards' 2015 ceremony.
