= Alina Nanu =

Moldavian ballet dancer (born 1990)

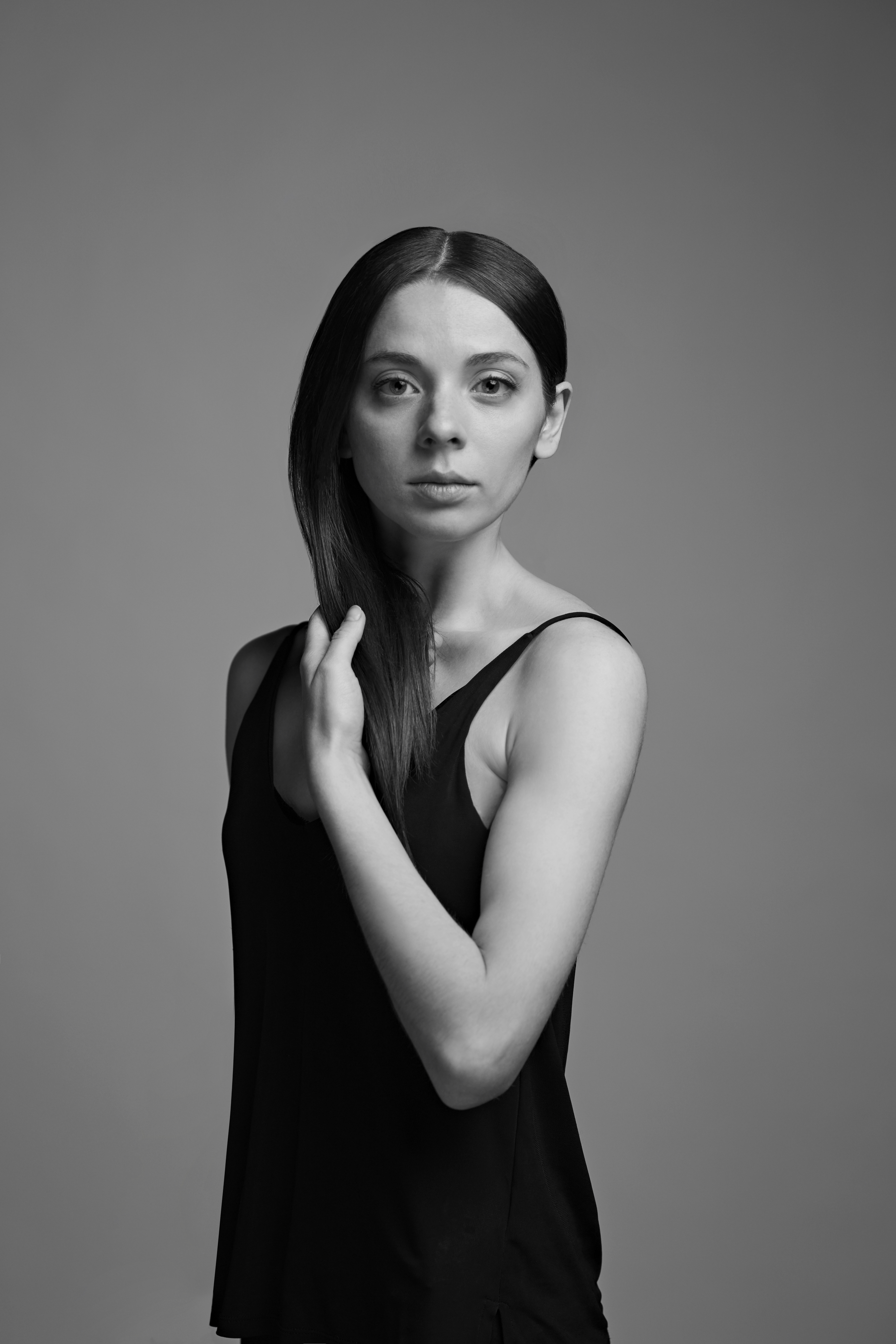
- Born: 23 August 1990 (age 35); Chișinău, Moldovan SSR, Soviet Union
- Education: Choreographic School of Chisinau, Prague Conservatory
- Occupation: Ballet dancer
- Career
- Current group: National Theatre (Prague), Czech Republic
- Website: www.alinananu.com

Alina Nanu (Russian: Алина Нану, born 23 August 1990) is a professional ballet dancer. She is a principal dancer with the National Theatre in Prague and became the youngest principal dancer in the history of the theatre.

== Biography ==
Alina Nanu was born in Chișinău, Moldovan SSR in a family with Moldovan and Russian roots by father and having Ossetian roots on her maternal side. At the age of nine years, she started to attend Choreographic School of Chisinau. At the age of nineteen, Nanu moved to Prague, Czech Republic to continue studies in Prague Conservatory. Nanu started her career at State Opera Prague and joined the ballet of National Theatre in 2012.

== Awards and honours ==
	Award	Year	Ballet	Role	Choreographer
Nominated	Thalia Awards	2012	Don Quixote	Kitri	Jaroslav Slavický
Won	Thalia Awards	2019	La fille mal gardée	Lisa	Frederick Ashton
Won	Thalia Awards	2020	Onegin	Tatiana	John Cranko
