= Kateřina Holánová =

Czech actress

- Born: 13 October 1977 (age 47); Boskovice, Czechoslovakia
- Occupation: Actress
- Years active: 2003-present

Kateřina Holánová (born 13 October 1977) is a Czech film and stage actress. At the 2005 Thalia Awards she won the category of Best Actress in a Play, for the role of Rebecca West in the production of Rosmersholm. She studied at the Brno Conservatory before starting to perform at the Klicperovo divadlo in Hradec Králové, then moving on to the National Theatre Brno in 2004. Holánová's role in the 2003 film Boredom in Brno earned her a nomination for Best Leading Actress at the 2003 Czech Lion Awards.

== Selected filmography ==
- Boredom in Brno (2003)
- Hrubeš a Mareš jsou kamarádi do deště (2005)
