= Alena Antalová =

Slovak actress (born 1972)

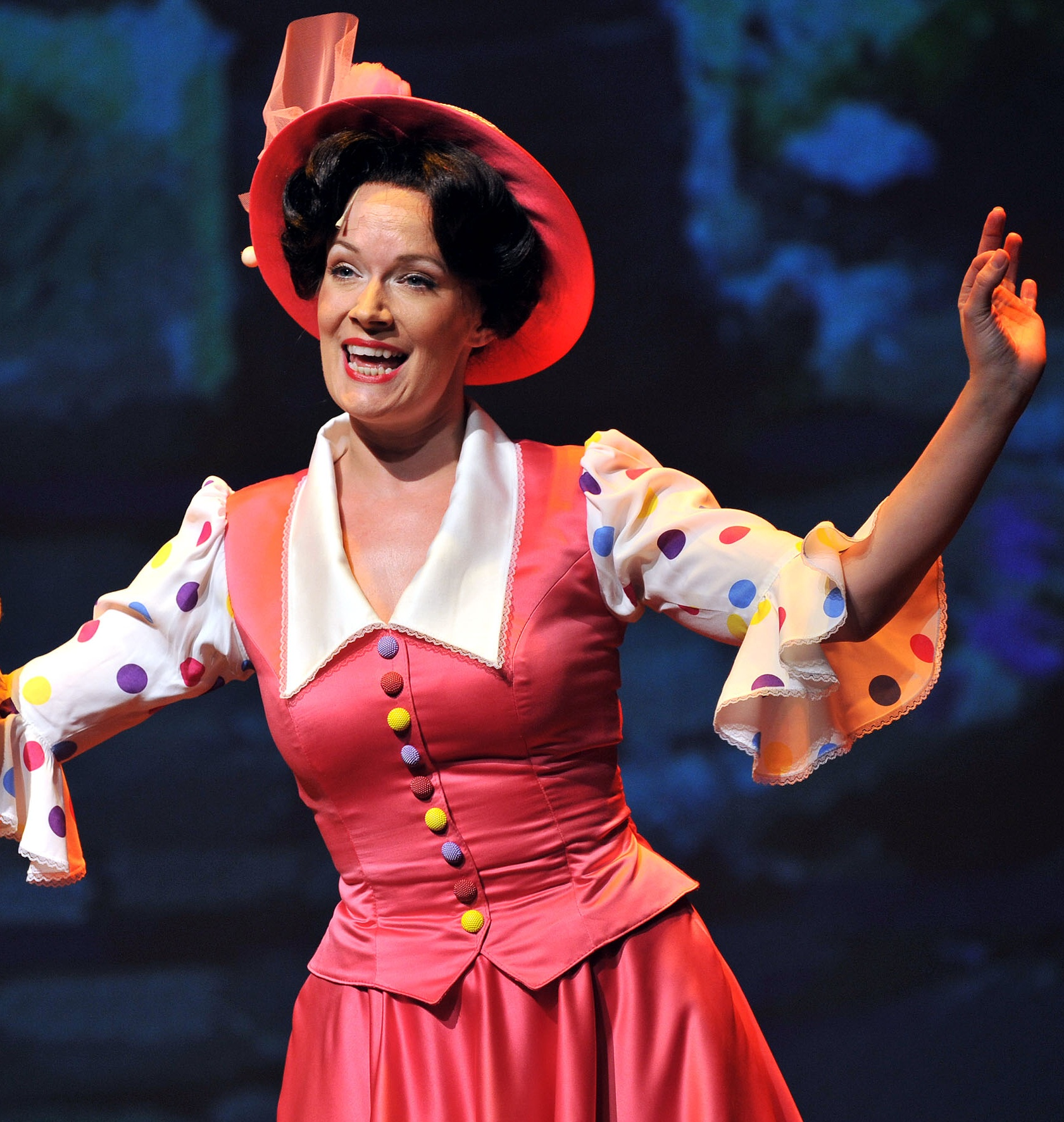
- Antalová in 2010
- Born: 28 July 1972 (age 54); Bratislava, Czechoslovakia
- Education: Janáček Academy of Music and Performing Arts
- Occupations: Stage and television Actress
- Spouse: Josef Juráček
- Children: 4

Alena Antalová (born 28 July 1972) is a Slovak actress.

== Biography ==
Alena Antalová was born on 28 July 1972 in Bratislava. Her grandfather was the Slovak National Theatre scenographer Ladislav Vychodil. She studied musical acting at Janáček Academy of Music and Performing Arts.

She has been a member of the Brno City Theatre since 1994. In 1999 she won the Thalia Award for Young Actors. Beyond theatre, she is known for appearing in popular TV Series Četnické humoresky and Pojišťovna štěstí.

== Personal life ==
Alena Antalová is married to the businessman Josef Juráček. They have four children.
