= Ivana Uhlířová =

Czech actress

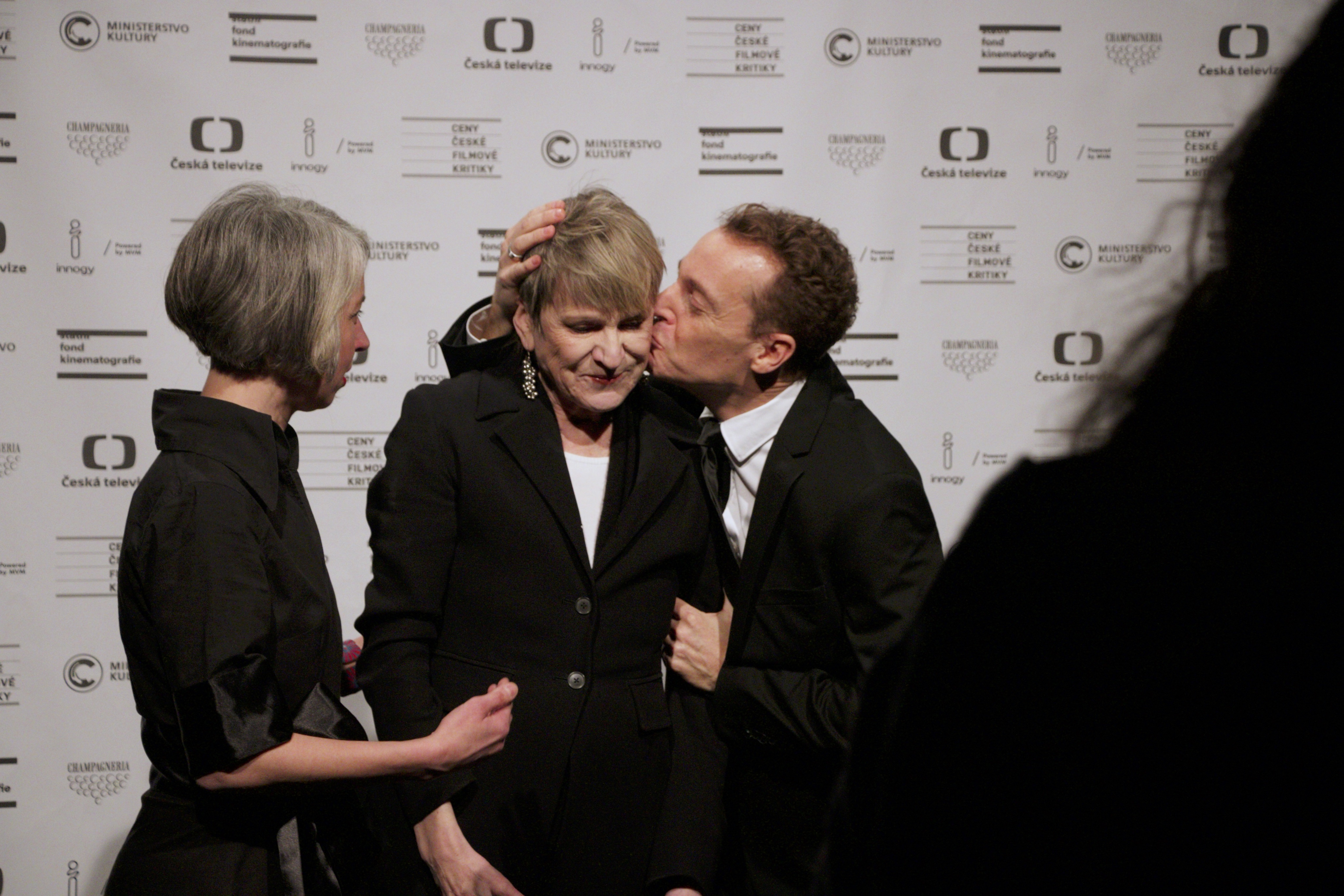
- Uhlířová (left) in 2024
- Born: 23 July 1980 (age 44); Rýmařov, Czechoslovakia
- Occupation: Actress
- Years active: 2001–present

Ivana Uhlířová (born 23 July 1980) is a Czech actress. After being named Talent of the Year at the 2006 Alfréd Radok Awards, she won the Alfréd Radok Award for Best Actress in 2010 for her role of Alžběta in the Ödön von Horváth play Víra, láska, naděje (German: Glaube, Liebe, Hoffnung) at the Divadlo Komedie in Prague. She made her film debut in the 2003 movie Boredom in Brno.
