= Thalia Awards =

Annual Czech acting award

Thalia Awards Ceny Thálie
- Awarded for: Excellence in theatrical achievements
- Country: Czech Republic
- Presented by: Actors' Association
- First award: 1993
- Website: cenythalie.cz

The Czech Actors' Association has presented its annual Thalia Awards (Czech: Ceny Thálie) since 1993. The award is named after Thalia, the muse of comedy. The 2016 ceremony was broadcast by Czech Television and radio station ČRo Dvojka.

Thalia Awards are presented for the following categories:

- Play
- Opera
- Musical
- Ballet

== Recipients ==
| Year | Play | | Ballet, pantomime | | Opera, operetta, musical | | | |
|---|---|---|---|---|---|---|---|---|
| 1993 | Pavel Pavlovský | | Petr Zuska | | Drahomíra Drobková | | | |
| 1994 | Věra Galatíková | Václav Postránecký | Zuzana Parmová | Jan Kadlec | Helena Kaupová | | Ivan Kusnjer | |
| 1995 | Zdena Herfortová | Jaroslav Dufek | Markéta Plzáková | Petr Kolář | Yvetta Blanarovičová | | Luděk Vele | |
| Year | Play | | Ballet, pantomime | | Opera | | Operetta, musical | |
| 1996 | Jana Hlaváčová | Jiří Lábus | Taťána Juřicová | Karel Littera | Eva Dřízgová-Jirušová | Luděk Vele (2)* | Jitka Molavcová | |
| 1997 | Alena Vránová | Josef Somr | Tereza Podařilová | Petr Zuska (2) | Eva Urbanová | Ivan Kusnjer (2) | Ludmila Machytková | Lubomír Lipský |
| 1998 | Iva Janžurová | František Němec | Nelly Danko | Jiří Pokorný | Eva Dřízgová-Jirušová (2) | Vladimír Chmelo | Petra Jungmanová | Ladislav Županič |
| 1999 | Helena Čermáková | Viktor Preiss | Jana Kosíková-Přibylová | Ivan Příkaský | Dagmar Pecková | Roman Janál | Markéta Sedláčková | Jan Ježek |
| 2000 | Taťjana Medvecká | Ivan Trojan | Kateřina Benešová- Rejmanová | Jiří Pokorný (2) | Klaudia Dernerová | Valentin Prolat | Lucie Bílá | Tomáš Černý |
| 2001 | Blanka Bohdanová | Josef Somr (2) | Taťána Juřicová (2) | Lubor Kvaček | Simona Houda-Šaturová | Ivan Kusnjer (3) | Marta Kubišová | Lumír Olšovský |
| 2002 | Taťjana Medvecká (2) | Martin Stropnický | Hana Litterová | Alexandr Katsapov | Regina Renzowa-Jürgens | Pavel Kamas | Daniela Šinkorová | Jiří Horký |
| 2003 | Barbora Hrzánová | Petr Kostka | Tereza Podařilová (2) | Filip Veverka | Yvona Škvárová | Jan Vacík | Stanislava Topinková- Fořtová | Jiří Korn |
| 2004 | Vanda Hybnerová | Boris Rösner | Zuzana Susová | Michal Štípa | Katarina Jorda Kramolišová | Peter Straka | Daniela Šinkorová (2) | Dušan Vitázek |
| 2005 | Kateřina Holánová | Ivan Řezáč | Tereza Podařilová (3) | Jiří Kodym | Eva Urbanová (2) | Jurij Gorbunov | Tereza Bebarová | Tomáš Šulaj |
| 2006 | Vilma Cibulková | David Prachař | Adéla Pollertová | Jan Fousek | Kate Aldrich | Johannes Chum | Radka Coufalová Vidláková | Tomáš Töpfer |
| 2007 | Simona Stašová | Erik Pardus | Nikola Márová | Michal Štípa (2) | Anda-Louise Bogza | Gianluca Zampieri | Pavla Břínková | Petr Štěpán |
| 2008 | Petra Hřebíčková | Norbert Lichý | Nataša Novotná | Vladimír Gončarov | Dana Burešová | Wej Lung-tchao | Zuzana Kolářová | Vlastimil Zavřel |
| 2009 | Kateřina Burianová | Martin Pechlát | Ivona Jeličová | Zdeněk Mládek | Csilla Boross | Pavel Vančura | Markéta Tallerová | Petr Gazdík |
| 2010 | Květa Fialová | Jiří Štěpnička | Zuzana Pokorná | Richard Kročil | Christina Vasileva | Richard Haan | Dagmar Sobková-Dasha | Marian Vojtko |
| 2011 | Helena Dvořáková | Václav Neužil | Miho Ogimoto | Jan Fousek (2) | Anna Klamo | Jacek Strauch | Monika Absolonová | Dušan Vitázek (2) |
| 2012 | Gabriela Míčová | Richard Krajčo | Lucie Skálová | Roberts Skujenieks | Jana Šrejma Kačírková | Aleš Briscein | Hana Holišová | Jan Kříž |
| 2013 | Tereza Vilišová | Petr Mikeska | Marta Drastíková | Ondřej Vinklát | Jana Šrejma Kačírková (2) | Jiří Přibyl | Lucie Bergerová | Marek Holý |
| 2014 | Vilma Cibulková (2) | Michal Isteník | Tereza Podařilová (4) | Richard Ševčík | Ivana Veberová | Aleš Briscein (2) | Hana Fialová | Tomáš Savka |
| 2015 | Zora Valchařová-Poulová | Radim Madeja | Kristýna Němečková | Viktor Konvalinka | Iordanka Derilova | Jaroslav Březina | Karolina Gudasová | Jan Kříž (2) |
| 2016 | Hana Tomáš Briešťanská | Milan Kňažko | Jui Kjotaniová | Radim Vizváry | Pavla Vykopalová | Thomas Weinhappel | Lenka Pavlovič | Josef Vojtek |
| 2017 | Tereza Dočkalová | Daniel Bambas | Nikola Márová (2) | Ondřej Vinklát | Maida Hundeling | Svatopluk Sem | Katarína Hasprová | Peter Pecha |
| 2018 | Lucie Trmíková | Viktor Dvořák | not awarded | not awarded | Kateřina Kněžíková | Ondřej Koplík | Martina Šnytová | Vojtěch Dyk |
| 2020 | Tereza Groszmannová | Petr Štěpán | not awarded | not awarded | Jana Šrejma Kačírková | Lukáš Zeman | Erika Stárková | Pavel Režný |
| 2021 | not awarded | not awarded | not awarded | not awarded | not awarded | not awarded | not awarded | not awarded |
| 2022 | Veronika Korytářová | Saša Rašilov | not awarded | not awarded | Jana Sibera | Martin Bárta | Hana Fialová (2) | Lumír Olšovský (2) |
| 2023 | Karolína Baranová | Martin Pechlát (2) | not awarded | not awarded | Arnheiður Eiríksdóttir | Jaroslav Březina (2) | Hana Holišová (2) | Tomáš Savka (2) |
| 2024 | Kateřina Císařová | Miloslav König | not awarded | not awarded | Soňa Godarská | Peter Berger | Markéta Schimmerová Procházková | Lukáš Vlček |
| 2025 | Tereza Dočkalová (2) | Petr Panzenberger | not awarded | not awarded | Petra Alvarez Šimková | Marcel Beekman | Monika Absolonová (2) | Lukáš Adam |
| 2026 | Lucie Žáčková | Stanislav Majer | not awarded | not awarded | Magdalena Kožená | Štefan Margita | Natálie Tichánková | Marco Salvadori |

| Year | Distribution of theatre art in Television | Alternative and Puppet Theatre | Dance, movement theatre | | Puppet Theatre | Ballet, Dance, movement theatre | | Alternative theatre |
|---|---|---|---|---|---|---|---|---|
| 2017 | František Filip | | | | | | | |
| 2018 | Ondřej Šrámek | Milan Hajn | Alina Nanu | Dominik Vodička | | | | |
| 2020 | Josef Špelda | not awarded | not awarded | | Ondřej Nosálek | Alina Nanu (2) | Ondřej Vinklát (3) | Jakub Gottwald |
| 2021 | Jaroslav Someš | not awarded | not awarded | | not awarded | not awarded | not awarded | not awarded |
| 2022 | Viktor Polesný | not awarded | not awarded | | Gustav Hašek | Natalia Adamská | Sergio Méndez Romero | Nela H. Kornetová |
| 2023 | Marie Loucká | not awarded | not awarded | | Jiří Kniha | Helena Arenbergerová | Matěj Šust | Becka McFadden |
| 2024 | Alfred Strejček | not awarded | not awarded | | Marek Bečka, Radek Beran and Vít Brukner | Klára Jelínková | Patrik Holeček | Martina Hajdyla Lacová |
| 2025 | Jakub Špalek | not awarded | not awarded | | Kristýna Franková | Romina Contreras | Federico Ievoli | Martin Talaga |
| 2026 | Milan Hein | not awarded | not awarded | | Diana Čičmanová | Anna Yeh | Giovanni Rotolo | Miřenka Čechová |

* ( ) A number in parentheses following a performer's name indicates the number of awards received by that performer.

== Thalia Awards for Lifetime Achievement ==
Nelly Gajerová received a lifetime achievement award at the 1993 ceremony for her achievements in the field of Operetta. An award relating to that specific field has not been conferred since.

| Year | Play | Ballet, pantomime | Opera | Musical | Dance, movement theatre | Ballet, Dance, movement theatre | Alternative theatre | Foreign artist |
|---|---|---|---|---|---|---|---|---|
| 1993 | Josef Kemr | not awarded | Karel Berman | | | | | |
| 1994 | Zora Rozsypalová | Miroslav Kůra | Maria Tauberová | | | | | |
| 1995 | Radovan Lukavský | Olga Skálová | Karel Kalaš | | | | | |
| 1996 | Jaroslava Adamová | Miroslava Figarová | Libuše Domanínská | | | | | |
| 1997 | Vlastimil Brodský | Viktor Malcev | Ivo Žídek | | | | | |
| 1998 | Jiřina Jirásková | Zora Šemberová | Milada Šubrtová | | | | | |
| 1999 | Jiří Sovák | Jaromír Petřík | Jiří Zahradníček | | | | | |
| 2000 | Stella Zázvorková | Marta Drottnerová | Ivana Mixová | | | | | |
| 2001 | Lubor Tokoš | Jiří Blažek | Richard Novák | | | | | |
| 2002 | Věra Tichánková | Vlasta Pavelcová | Ludmila Dvořáková | | | | | |
| 2003 | Otakar Brousek, Sr. | Jiří Žalud | Antonín Švorc | | | | | |
| 2004 | Antonie Hegerlíková | Věra Vágnerová | Marie Steinerová | | | | | |
| 2005 | Lubomír Lipský | Jiří Nermut | Jaroslav Horáček | | | | | |
| 2006 | Věra Kubánková | Jiřina Šlezingrová-Škodová | Miloslava Fidlerová | | | | | |
| 2007 | Ilja Racek | Jaroslav Čejka | Václav Zítek | | | | | |
| 2008 | Marie Tomášová | Růžena Mazalová | Alena Míková | | | | | |
| 2009 | Josef Karlík (in memoriam) | Boris Hybner | Vladimír Krejčík | | | | | |
| 2010 | Jiřina Bohdalová | Věra Ždichyncová | Naděžda Kniplová (refused) | | | | | |
| 2011 | Luděk Munzar | Vlastimil Harapes | René Tuček | | | | | |
| 2012 | Jana Hlaváčová | Jiřina Knížková | Helena Tattermuschová | Karel Fiala | | | | |
| 2013 | Josef Somr | Petr Koželuh | Zdeněk Švehla | Dagmar Rosíková | | | | |
| 2014 | Blanka Bohdanová | Dagmar Ledecká-Šebková | Zdena Kareninová | Josef Zíma | | | | |
| 2015 | Stanislav Zindulka | Pavel Ždichynec | Dalibor Jedlička | Ladislav Županič | | | | |
| 2016 | Alena Vránová | Marcela Martiníková | Marcela Machotková | Pavla Břínková | | | | |
| 2017 | Petr Kostka | Richard Böhm | Miroslav Švejda | Jiří Korn | | | | |
| 2018 | Helena Kružíková, Ladislav Mrkvička | not awarded | Gabriela Beňačková | Věra Vlková | Zdenka Kratochvílová | | | |
| 2020 | Hana Bauerová, Josef Abrhám | not awarded | Jan Malík | Hana Talpová | not awarded | Aneta Voleská | | |
| 2021 | Iva Janžurová, Zdenka Procházková, Libuše Švormová-Paterová, Jaroslav Satoranský, Alois Švehlík, Karel Urbánek | not awarded | Eva Randová | Jitka Molavcová | not awarded | Jaroslav Slavický | Ján Sedal | |
| 2022 | Veronika Forejtová, František Němec | not awarded | Libuše Márová | Galla Macků | not awarded | Libuše Králová | Bolek Polívka | |
| 2023 | Daniela Kolářová, Stanislav Šárský | not awarded | Jan Hladík | Jiří Suchý, František Zacharník | not awarded | Miroslava Pešíková | not awarded | |
| 2024 | Štěpánka Ranošová, Viktor Preiss | not awarded | Naďa Šormová | Helena Vondráčková | not awarded | Josef Kotěšovský | Jan Číhal | |
| 2025 | Dana Syslová, Ladislav Frej | not awarded | Natalia Achaladze Romanová | Jan Ježek | not awarded | Alice Kvasnicová | Lenka Machoninová | Zdena Studenková |
| 2025 | Zdena Herfortová, Petr Nárožný | not awarded | Luděk Vele | Jaroslava Kretschmerová | not awarded | Nelly Danko | not awarded | Emil Horváth |

== Awards for young actors, special awards ==
| Year | Young actors | Kolegium Award | Czech Theatre Academy Award |
|---|---|---|---|
| 1995 | awarded | Eduard Haken (in memoriam) | |
| 1996 | Jan Potměšil | Miroslav Horníček | |
| 1997 | Petra Špalková | Svatopluk Beneš | |
| 1998 | Jiří Langmajer | Divadlo na Fidlovačce Praha | |
| 1999 | Alena Antalová | Ctibor Turba | |
| 2000 | Radek Holub | Otomar Krejča | |
| 2001 | Petra Výtvarová | Jiří Suchý | |
| 2002 | Ondřej Sokol | Jaromír Pleskot | |
| 2003 | Lucie Žáčková | Václav Havel | |
| 2004 | Filip Čapka | Soňa Červená | |
| 2005 | Evellyn Pacoláková | Pavel Šmok | |
| 2006 | Jan Hájek | Jiří Kylián | |
| 2007 | Michal Čapka | Vlasta Chramostová | |
| 2008 | Zbigniew Kalina | Josef Topol | |
| 2009 | Lucie Štěpánková | Ivan Vyskočil | |
| 2010 | Ladislav Špiner | Jiří Kout | |
| 2011 | Tereza Dočkalová | Josef Jelínek | |
| 2012 | Matouš Ruml | Arnošt Moulík | |
| 2013 | Martin Siničák | Ladislav Smoček | |
| 2014 | Lukáš Melník | Eva Kröschlová | |
| 2015 | Pavla Janiššová | Petr Weigl | |
| 2016 | Veronika Lazorčáková | Jan Schmid | |
| 2017 | Ivan Dejmal | Jiří Srnec | |
| 2018 | Zuzana Truplová | not awarded | Zdeněk Svěrák |
| 2020 | Josef Láska | not awarded | Jaroslav Vostrý |
| 2021 | Denisa Barešová | not awarded | Jan Kačer |
| 2022 | Dalibor Buš | not awarded | Martin Hilský |
| 2023 | Viktor Kuzník | not awarded | Milan Uhde |
| 2024 | Kamila Janovičová | not awarded | Lída Engelová |
| 2025 | Viktor Zavadil | not awarded | Jan Dušek |
| 2026 | Simona Lewandowska | not awarded | Miroslav Kořínek |
