= Lucie Trmíková =

Czech actress

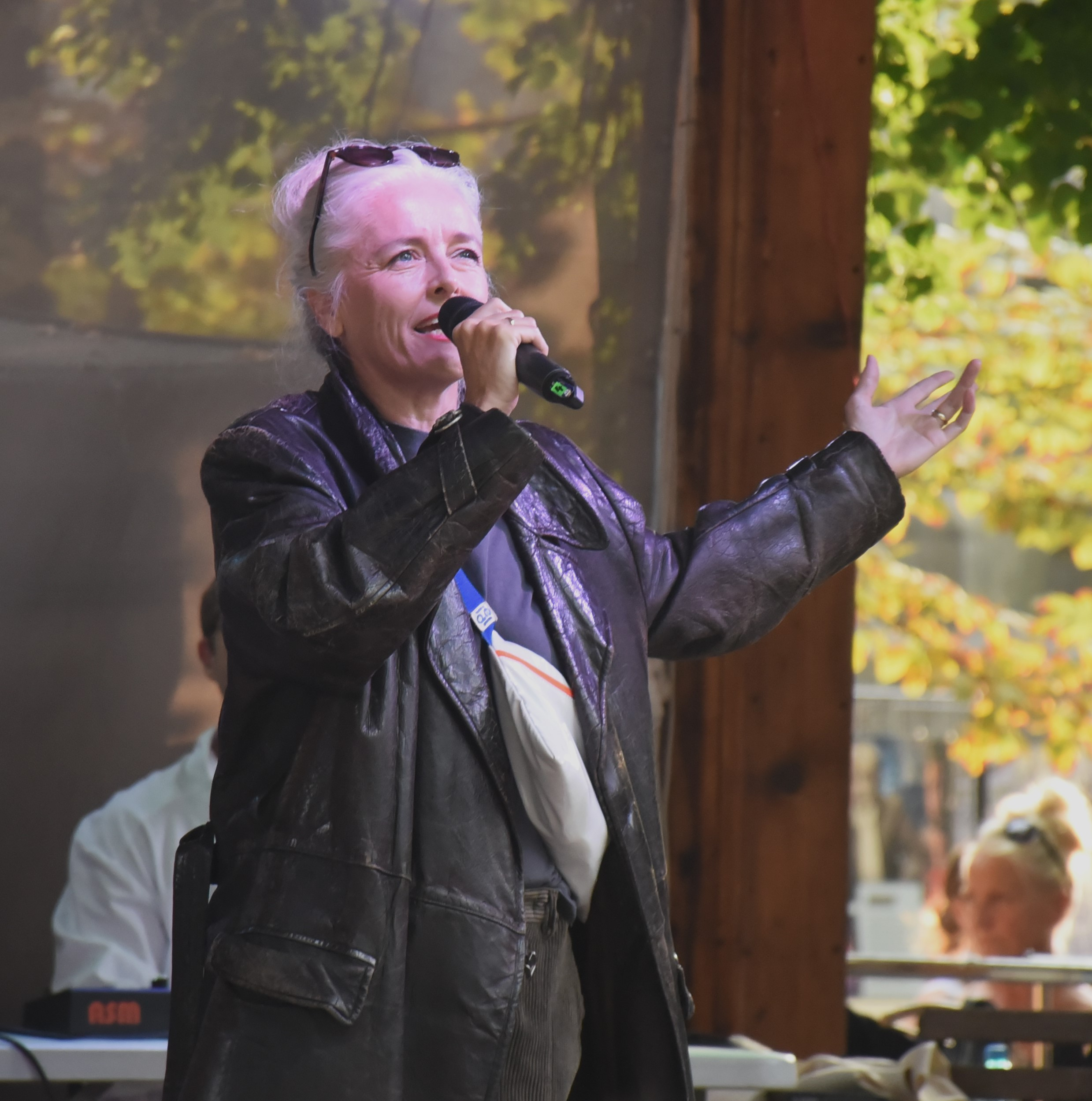
- Trmíková in 2024
- Born: 17 July 1969 (age 56); Kolín, Czechoslovakia
- Occupation: Actress
- Years active: 1988–present

Lucie Trmíková (born 17 July 1969) is a Czech actress. She won the Alfréd Radok Award for Best Actress in 1997 for performing the title role in a production of the play Terezka at the Divadlo Komedie in Prague. She was nominated in the same category at the 2013 awards, but finally lost out to Tereza Vilišová.
