= Alexander Katsapov =

Russian dancer

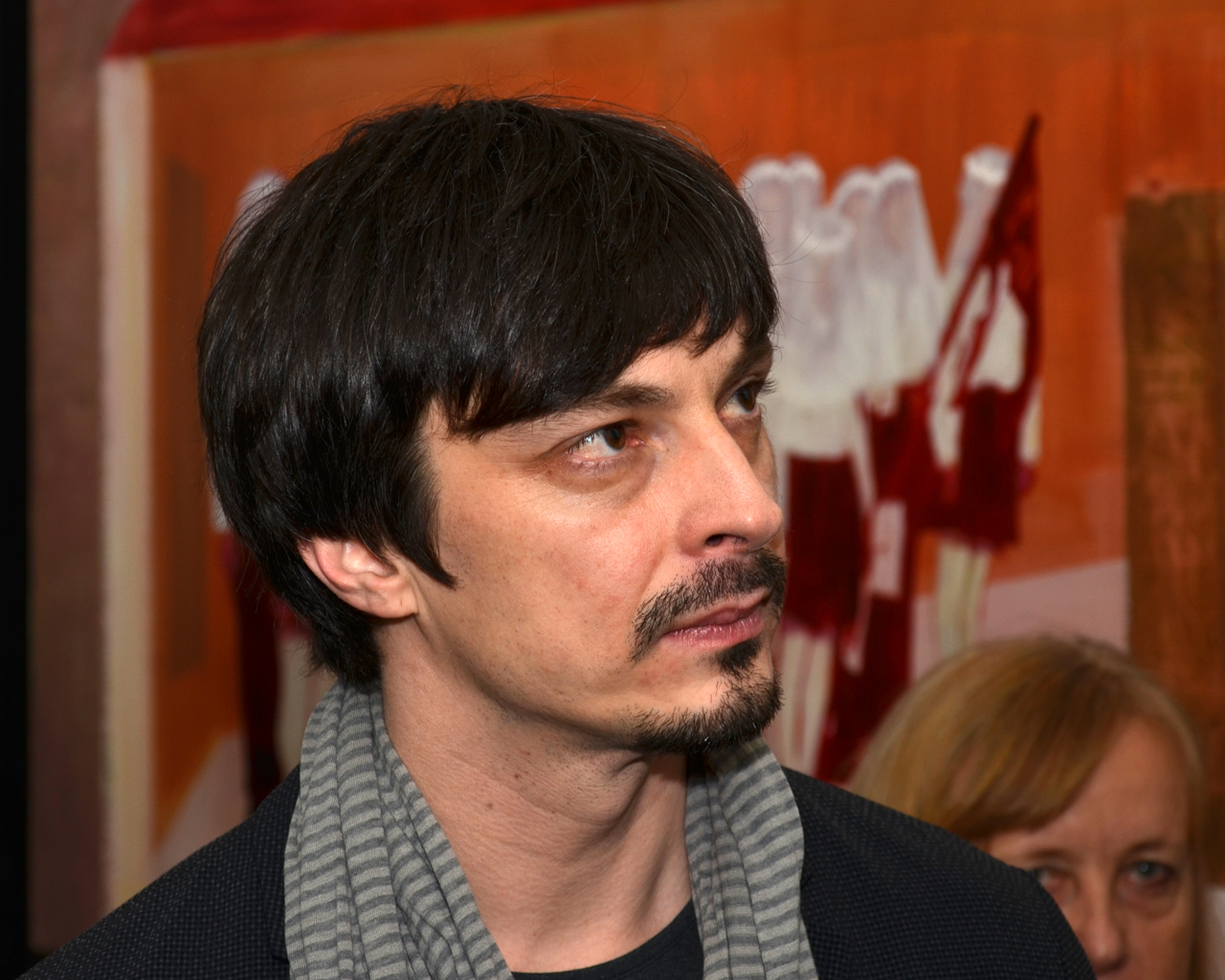
- Born: 23 April 1975 (age 51); Leningrad (St. Petersburg) Russia
- Occupation: Principal dancer
- Years active: 1993–present
- Career
- Former groups: National Theatre Ballet of Prague
- Website: www.alexanderkatsapov.estranky.cz

Alexander Katsapov (born 27 April 1975; Leningrad) is a Russian award–winning principal dancer of the National Theatre Ballet of Prague, Czech Republic.

== Biography ==
Katsapov grew up in Leningrad (St. Petersburg, Russia) until he was 20 years old. He studied at the Vaganova Academy of Russian Ballet and from 1993 worked at the Mikhailovsky Theatre. In 1996 he was invited to the National Theatre in Prague by artistic director Vlastimil Harapes. In 1997 Katsapov became a soloist of the National Theatre and since 2003 he is a principal dancer.
