= Zdena Herfortová =

Czech actress

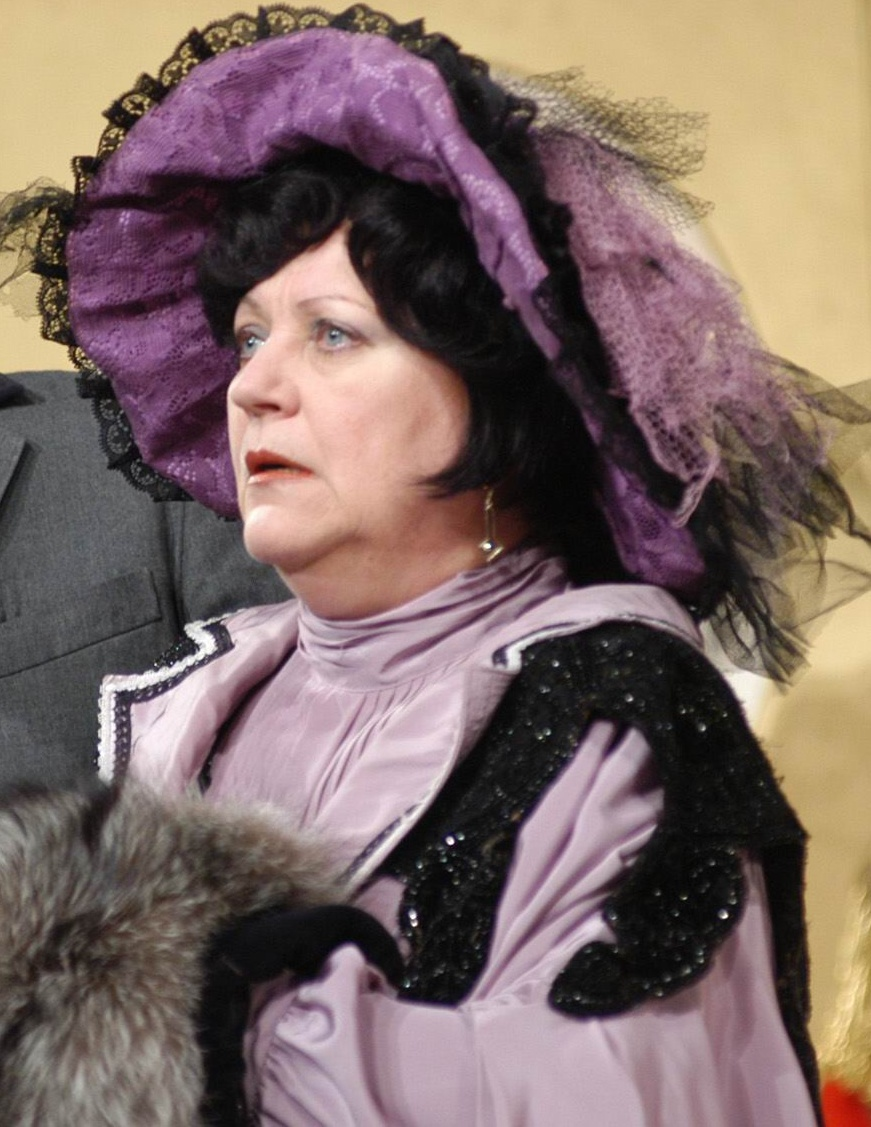
- Herfortová in 2002
- Born: 8 October 1945 (age 79); Brno, Czechoslovakia
- Occupation: Actress
- Years active: 1968-present

Zdena Herfortová (born 8 October 1945) is a Czech film and stage actress. She has performed over 90 theatre roles and 150 television roles. At the 1995 Thalia Awards she won the category of Best Actress in a Play, for the title role in the production of Alžběta Anglická. She performed at the Mahen Theatre in Brno between 1968 and 1992, subsequently transferring to the Brno City Theatre. Since 1976, she has taught at the Janáček Academy of Music and Performing Arts in Brno.

== Selected filmography ==
- Cops and Robbers (television, 1997–2007)
- Doktoři z Počátků (television, 2013–2016)
