= Helena Dvořáková =

Czech actress (born 1979)

- Born: 30 January 1979 (age 46); Brno, Czechoslovakia
- Occupation: Actress

Helena Dvořáková (born 30 January 1979) is a Czech actress.

== Biography ==
She was born in Brno, Czechoslovakia. She studied at an academic gymnasium and later continued her studies of dramatic arts at the Janáček Academy of Musical Arts (JAMU) in Brno. She graduated from JAMU in 2002. Following her studies, she spent five seasons at the stage of the City Theatre in Brno. She is a member of the ensemble of Prague's Theatre in Dlouhá Street. She gave birth in 2016, and the father's name was Ondřej.

== Theatre ==
=== Theatre in Dlouhá Street ===
- Lékař své cti .... Doňa Mencía de Acuňa
- Vějíř s broskvovými květy .... Siang
- Experiment .... Eglé
- Onegin was Russian .... Ms. Klepáčová/Gábina
- Phaedra .... Phaedra
- Maskerade .... Agnes Nitt
- The Liar .... Rosaura de Bisognosi
- Demons .... Lisavet Nikolaievna

=== Městské divadlo, Brno ===
- The Seagull .... Masha
- Mourning Becomes Electra .... Lavinia
- Cabaret .... Sally Bowles
- Hair .... Ronny
- Kamenný most .... Corallina
- Znamení kříže .... Julia Calderón

== Other stage works ==
- Life is a Dream, Divadlo U stolu
- Macbeth, Divadlo U stolu
- 1+1=3, Studio G
- Variace na chlast
- Niekur, Ungelt Theatre, Prague
- Ivanov, Činoherní klub, Prague
- Man of La Mancha, theatre in Germany

== Filmography ==
- Colette (2013) .... Kordula
- Stínu neutečeš (Vnučka) (2009) .... Granddaughter
- "Kriminálka Anděl" (2008) TV series .... Jana Chládková (2008–2011)

== Awards ==
- Nejlepší ženský herecký výkon (Best Female) - Role: Anežka Nulíčková in Maškaráda (Grand Festival of Smiling in Pardubice (Won)
- Nejlepší ženský herecký výkon (Best Lead Female) - Role: Phaedra in Pahedra (Alfréd Radok Awards (won) and Thalia Awards (nominated))
- Nejlepší ženský herecký výkon (Best Female) - Role: Julia Calderón in Znamení kříže (Alfréd Radok Awards) (nominated)
- Nejlepší ženský herecký výkon (Best Female) - Role: Lady Macbeth in Macbeth (Thalia Awards and Alfréd Radok Awards) (nominated)

== Personal life ==
Dvořáková plays flute and singing in the choir and with folk band.
