= Csilla Boross =

Hungarian operatic soprano

Csilla Boross is a Hungarian operatic soprano who has had an active international career since her professional debut in 2003. She is particularly well known for her portrayal of Abigaille in Giuseppe Verdi's Nabucco. In 2009 she was the recipient of the Thalia Award and in 2016 she was awarded the Knight's Cross of the Hungarian Order of Merit.

== Career ==
Born in Budapest, Boross was educated at the Franz Liszt Academy of Music. She made her professional debut in 2003 at the Hungarian State Opera as Konstanze in Mozart's Die Entführung aus dem Serail. She was a resident artist at that opera house from 2003 to 2008, and since the 2008–2009 season she has been a resident artist at the National Theatre Brno, Janáček Theatre. In her early career, she performed roles from the lighter coloratura soprano repertoire, including Cleopatra in Handel's Giulio Cesare, Gilda in Verdi's Rigoletto, and Violetta in Verdi's La traviata. Later in her career she added roles from heavier more dramatic repertoire, including Donna Anna in Don Giovanni, Cio-Cio-San in Madama Butterfly, Tatiana in Eugene Onegin, Venus in Tannhäuser, and the title roles in Adriana Lecouvreur, Aida, Jenůfa, Káťa Kabanová, and Tosca.

In 2010 Boross made her United States debut at the Palm Beach Opera as Abigaille in Giuseppe Verdi's Nabucco; a role she has performed with numerous companies, including a performance at the Teatro dell'Opera di Roma under the baton of Riccardo Muti that was filmed for national broadcast on television in Italy in 2011. She has also performed the role of Abigaille at the Washington National Opera (2012), Opera Philadelphia (2013), Grand Théâtre de Genève (2014), Pittsburgh Opera (2015), the Baths of Caracalla (2017, again with the Rome Opera), the Teatro Regio Torino (2020), and the Opéra de Marseille (2023).

In 2013 Boross performed the role of Amelia in Verdi's Un ballo in maschera with Opera Australia. In 2014 she portrayed Lady Macbeth in Verdi's Macbeth at the Palm Beach Opera, and the title role in Bellini's Norma at the Teatro Massimo in Palermo. In 2015 she was the soprano soloist in Verdi's Requiem at Victoria Hall (Geneva) with conductor Edo de Waart leading the musical forces. In 2022 she performed the title role in Amilcare Ponchielli's La Gioconda at the Chorégies d'Orange; a work she had previously sung for the opera's first staging in the Czech Republic at the National Theatre Brno in 2017.
