= Valery Marov =

Belarusian footballer

Personal information
- Date of birth: 17 November 1993 (age 32)
- Place of birth: Borisov, Belarus
- Height: 1.69 m (5 ft 6 1/2 in)
- Position: Midfielder

Youth career
- 2011–2013: Torpedo-BelAZ Zhodino

Senior career*
Years	Team	Apps	(Gls)
2014–2015	Torpedo-BelAZ Zhodino	1	(0)
2014	→ Smolevichi-STI (loan)	25	(0)
2016–2017	Orsha	50	(2)
2018	Luch Minsk	11	(0)
2018	UAS Zhitkovichi	12	(0)
- * Club domestic league appearances and goals as of 31 December 2018

Valery Marov (Belarusian: Валерый Мараў; Russian: Валерий Маров; born 17 November 1993) is a Belarusian professional football player .
