= Pavla Tomicová =

Czech actress

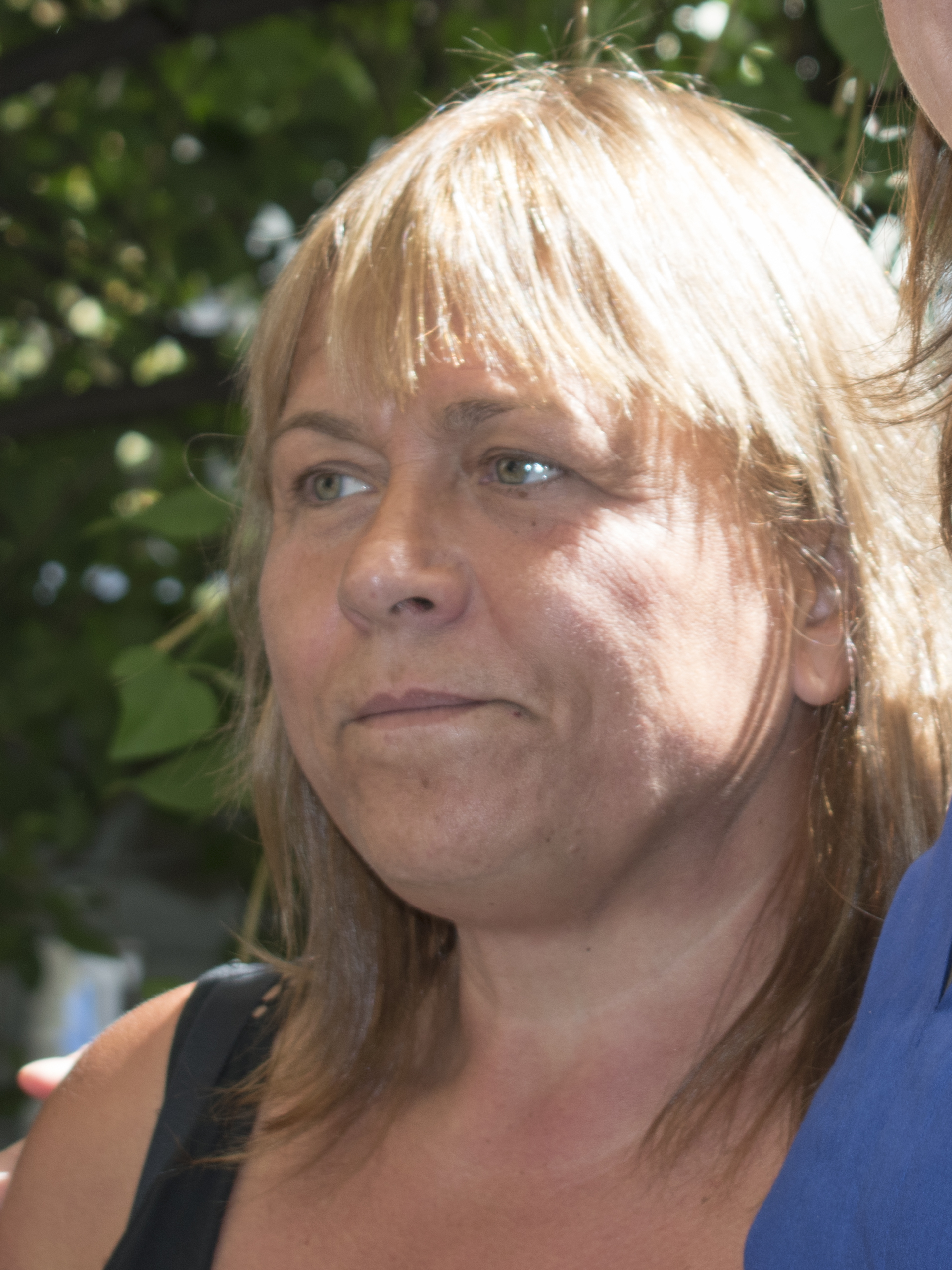
- Tomicová in 2017
- Born: 25 June 1962 (age 64); Karviná, Czechoslovakia
- Occupation: Actress
- Years active: 1991-present
- Spouse: Ondřej Malý (2003–2022)

Pavla Tomicová (born 25 June 1962, married surname Malá) is a Czech actress. She won the Alfréd Radok Award for Best Actress in 1999 for her role of Maryša in the play Maryša - po pravdě však "Mařka" at the Klicpera Theatre in Hradec Králové. Tomicová has acted in various films, including Boredom in Brno, Rafťáci and Hrubeš a Mareš jsou kamarádi do deště.

In 2026 she appeared in Chica Checa, a comedy drama directed by Šimon Holý as Zdena.
