= Hrubeš a Mareš jsou kamarádi do deště =

- Directed by: Vladimír Morávek
- Written by: Vladimír Morávek; Jan Budař
- Produced by: Čestmír Kopecky
- Starring: Jan Budař
- Cinematography: Divis Marek
- Edited by: Jiří Brožek
- Release date: 13 October 2005
- Country: Czech Republic
- Language: Czech

Hrubeš a Mareš jsou kamarádi do deště is a Czech comedy film directed by Vladimír Morávek. It was released in 2005.

== Cast ==
- Jan Budař - Václav Hrubeš
- Richard Krajčo - Josef Mareš
- Miroslav Donutil - Václav Hrubeš senior
- Iva Janžurová - Lída Hrubešová
- Magdaléna Borová - Irena Hajíčková
- Robert Roth - Robert Karpatti
- Simona Peková - Simona Špeková
- Stella Zázvorková - Miriam Marešová
- Radovan Lukavský - Josef Mareš
- Ester Kočičková - Ester Kotrlá
- Filip Rajmont - Kamil
- Pavla Tomicová - Carmen Bohunská
