= Boredom in Brno =

2003 Czech comedy film

- Film poster
- Directed by: Vladimír Morávek
- Written by: Vladimír Morávek; Jan Budař
- Produced by: Čestmír Kopecký
- Starring: Jan Budař; Kateřina Holánová; Martin Pechlát; Miroslav Donutil; Pavla Tomicová
- Edited by: Jiří Brožek
- Music by: Jan Budař
- Distributed by: Bontonfilm
- Release date: April 22, 2003
- Running time: 103 minutes
- Country: Czech Republic
- Language: Czech

Boredom in Brno (Czech: Nuda v Brně) is a Czech comedy film directed by Vladimír Morávek, based on the story "Standa's Debut" by Pavel Bedura. It was released in 2003, and won five Czech Lion awards, including Best Film, Best Director (Morávek), Best Script (Morávek and Jan Budař), Best Male Actor in a Leading Role (Budař) and Best Editing (Jiří Brožek).

== Cast ==
- Kateřina Holánová as Olga Simáková
- Jan Budař as Stanislav Pichlík
- Miroslav Donutil as Miroslav Norbacher
- Martin Pechlát as Jaroslav Pichlík
- Jaroslava Pokorná as Miriam Simáková
- Pavla Tomicová as PhDr. Vlasta Kulková - Jará
- Ivana Hloužková as Marie Norbacherová
- Marek Daniel as Richard Klech
- Ivana Uhlířová as Jaroslava Pleváková
- Pavel Liška as Jan Bedura
- Filip Rajmont as Pavel Velicka
- Simona Peková as Jitka Spácilová
- Zuzana Valchárová-Poulová as Zorka V.
- Nadezda Chroboková as Simona P.
- Martina Nováková-Hamadáková as Martina N.

== Plot ==
The film follows several couples over one night in Brno. The focus is on a 20-something couple with unspecified learning difficulties, Olinka (Kateřina Holánová) and Standa (Jan Budař), who are preparing to have sex for the first time. Standa has been receiving advice from his brother Jarda (Martin Pechlát), while Olinka has been given tips and guidance by her friends, the women who live in her apartment block. Standa and Jarda travel to Brno from Brundal for the occasion.

Meanwhile, in a nearby pub, depressed actor Mirek (Miroslav Donutil) is with psychologist Vlasta (Pavla Tomicová), complaining about his life, and the two presently return to Vlasta's flat together where they have sex, and Vlasta counsels Mirek about the state of his marriage. In the same pub are Jaroslava (Ivana Uhlířová), a young woman who habitually attracts unpleasant men, and her current partner Richard (Marek Daniel), a pretentious and self-absorbed man who is tempted by sexual experimentation and submission. This couple return to Richard's flat in the same apartment block where Richard persuades an unwilling Jaroslava to spank him, alongside other requests. Also in the pub are life-long friends Honza (Pavel Liška) and Pavel (Filip Rajmont). While Honza rambles drunkenly about his desire for various women, Pavel has an undeclared love for Honza.

At the house, Olinka is horrified to see her controlling mother return unexpectedly to the flat. Panicking, she administers rohypnol into her mother's coffee, and locks her unconscious in a storage cupboard. Standa arrives and they visit Olinka's friends so Standa can be vetted for their approval. Back down in Olinka's flat, Standa and Olinka share an awkward meal, and then proceed to the bedroom and are extremely nervous, but eventually Olinka manages to initiate sex. Despite Jarda's training, Standa is unable to put on the condom, so they do not use one. Meanwhile Jarda arrives at Olinka's friends' party upstairs to drink with them.

Meanwhile, Mirek leaves Vlasta's house to go home, but on the way has a drunken argument with his wife on the phone, and ends up walking home to Líšeň in a drunken depression. Honza and Pavel also head home to Pavel's house, and Pavel is perturbed when Honza kisses his cheek while he sleeps. After having sex, Olinka excitedly tells her friends what happened, but at the same time her mother wakes up and sees Standa dancing in his underwear through the keyhole. When Olinka returns to the flat, the two women argue, and Standa flees the flat in panic.

Pavel and Honza leave Pavel's place very early to deliver rohlík to Líšeň, but on the way Pavel takes his eyes off the road and hits Mirek, killing him. Comforting Pavel, Honza confides that his love is returned. Meanwhile, Olinka releases her mother from the pantry, but then locks her in again when Standa returns to her. A voice over confirms that Olinka is pregnant.
