= Jan Budař =

Czech actor, scriptwriter and director

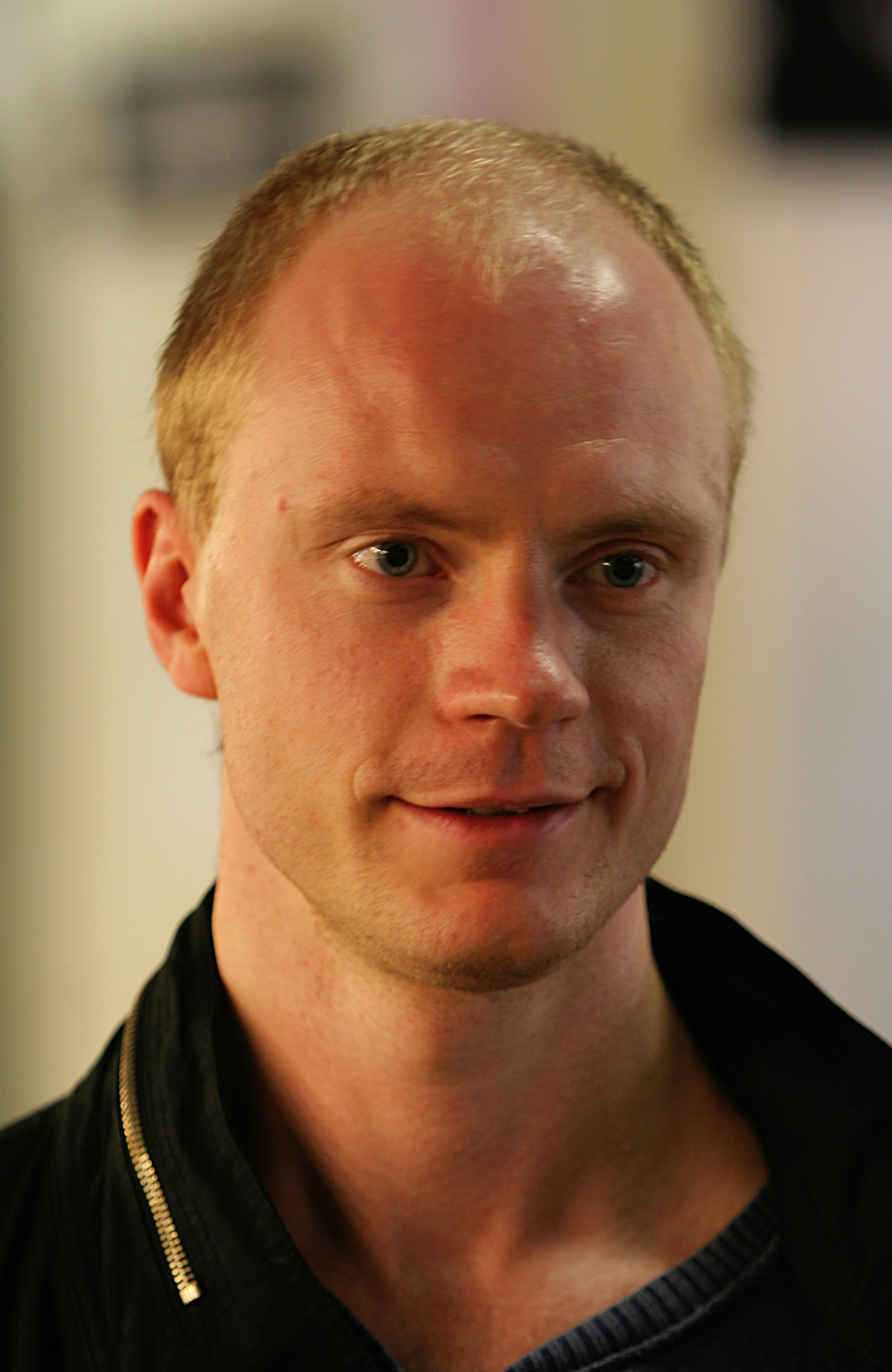
- Jan Budař in 2007
- Born: 31 July 1977 (age 48); Frýdlant, Czechoslovakia
- Occupations: Czech impostor, actor, scriptwriter and director

Jan Budař (born 31 July 1977) is a Czech actor, director, singer, composer and script writer.

== Biography ==
Budař was born in Frýdlant near Liberec. He graduated from the Janáček Academy of Music and Performing Arts (JAMU) in Brno in 2000. He started his career in Brno's theatres under the tutelage of theatre director Vladimír Morávek. This creative partnership led to their first film, Boredom in Brno. Budař also co-authored the script and composed the music. The comedy was awarded five Czech Lions in 2003, including Best Male Actor for Jan Budař's performance. Budař went on to roles in Marek Najbrt's debut Champions and Jan Hřebejk's Up and down, the Czech entry for the Academy Awards, which won several awards at the Czech Lion Awards 2005. Morávek and Budař created their second film, Hrubeš and Mareš best friends: come rain or shine.

Budař also sings with a band called the Eliščin Band, and makes short films, documentaries and videos. In March 2005, Budař won the Czech Lion award for "Best Supporting Actor" in Champions. In February 2005, Budař went to Berlin to represent Czech cinematography at the Berlinale 2005 Film Festival.

== Selected filmography ==
- 1997: Četnické humoresky (TV series)
- 1998: Stůj, nebo se netrefím! – Soldier
- 1998: Winter '89 – Thomas
- 1999: Urlaub auf Leben und Tod – Eine Familie hält zusammen (TV series)
- 2000: Rasistické historky (TV series)
- 2000: Český Robinson (TV Series)
- 2001: Otec neznámý aneb Cesta do hlubin duše výstrojního náčelníka (TV movie) – Soldier
- 2001: Muž, který vycházel z hrobu (TV movie)
- 2002: Ta třetí (TV Movie) – Emil
- 2003: Čert ví proč – Man-at-arms No. 1
- 2003: Boredom in Brno – Stanislav Pichlík
- 2004: Mistři (Champions) – Bohouš
- 2004: Horem pádem (Up and down) – Milan
- 2004: Duše jako kaviár (Dirty soul) – Vladimír
- 2005: Voníš jako tenkrát – Adam
- 2005: Hrubeš a Mareš jsou kamarádi do deště – Václav Hrubeš
- 2005: Toyen – Jindřich Hejzlar
- 2005: Svatyně (Short)
- 2005: Ráno Ruth to vidí jinak (TV movie) – Adam
- 2005: Stavrogin je ďábel (theatre)
- 2006: Marta a Berta 26 (Short)
- 2006: Pravidla lži (Rules of lies) – Filip
- 2007: Vratné lahve (Empties) – Úlisný
- 2007: Hodina klavíru (TV Movie) – Ing. Erhadt
- 2007: Václav – František
- 2007: Trapasy (TV Series)
- 2008: Svatba na bitevním poli – Jumper
- 2008: Muzika (Slovakia, Germany) – Hruškovič
- 2008: Soukromé pasti (TV Series) – Tonda / Viktor Hojdar
- 2008: Nebe a Vincek (TV Movie) – Žáček
- 2008: Dark Spirits Natěrač (USA) – David
- 2008: Bez dechu (Short) (student film)
- 2008: Bratři Karamazovi: Vzkříšení (theatre)
- 2009: Holka Ferrari Dino
- 2009: Operace Dunaj (Operation Dunaj) (Czech Republic, Poland) – Ota
- 2009: Love Life of a Gentle Coward (Ljubavni život domobrana) (Croatia) – Honza
- 2009: La mujer sin piano – Rdek
- 2009: Protector (Czech Republic, Germany) – Colleague
- 2009: Žena bez piana (Mujer sin piano) (Spain)
- 2010: Dešťová víla – Vladimír
- 2010: Pravidelný odlet
- 2010: Román pro muže – René
- 2010: Heart Beat 3D
- 2010: Osudové peníze (TV Movie)
- 2010–2013: Vyprávěj (TV Series) – Milan Kohoutek
- 2011: Odcházení – Albín
- 2011: Czech Made Man – Jakub Vrána
- 2011: Lidice (Czech Republic, Poland) – Safebreaker Petiška
- 2011: Rodina je základ státu
- 2011: Setkání s hvězdou: Vilma Cibulková (TV movie)
- 2011: Vesnice roku (student film)
- 2011: Vetřelci a lovci: Užij si se psem (TV movie)
- 2012: eŠTeBák (Konfident) (Slovakia, Czech Republic, Poland) – Commander Rybarik
- 2012: Polski film (Czech Republic, Poland) – Jan Budař
- 2012: Praho, má lásko (students' film) – (segment "Právnička")
- 2012: O pokladech (TV Movie) – Treasure Guardian No. 2
- 2012: Výstava (Slovakia)
- 2012: Akvabely
- 2012: Duše na talíři
- 2013: Hořící keř (TV Mini-Series, directed by Agnieszka Holland) – Radim Bures
- 2013: Martin a Venuše – Ales
- 2013: Mieletön elokuu – Andrusenko
- 2013: České století (TV Series) – Václav Kopecký
- 2013: Sanitka II (TV Series) – Gordon Mádr
- 2013: Rozkoš
- 2013: Něžné vlny – postman Dusan Beznoska
- 2016: Smrtelné historky – Grandson
- 2016: Anthropoid – Josef Chalupský
- 2016: Instalatér z Tuchlovic – Radek
- 2016: Tenkrát v ráji
- 2017: Všechno nebo nic – Milan
- 2017: Svět pod hlavou (TV Series) – Klement Kratena
- 2017: Lajka – (voice)
- 2017: Princ Mamánek (fairy tale)
- 2018: Insects – Václav / Lumek / Jan Budar
- 2018: Hovory s TGM – Karel Čapek
- 2018: Čertí brko – Mr. Slime
- 2022: Medieval – Matthew

=== Documentary films ===
- 2006: Přestávka
- 2007: Film o filmu: Václav (TV film)
- 2008: Peníze Jiřího Krejčíka
- 2008: Film o filmu: Protektor (TV film)
- 2008: Anatomie gagu
- 2011: Film o filmu: Czech Made Man

=== Film direction ===
He directed several short films and videoclips mostly for his new album.

- 2004: Ráno
- 2006: Strážce plamene v obrazech (Video film)
- 2012: Polski film

=== Television programs ===
- 2000: Krásný ztráty
- 2004: Uvolněte se, prosím
- 2004: Na stojáka
- 2005: Všechnopárty
- 2007: Dobročinná akademie aneb Paraple 2007
- 2007: Český lev
- 2008: Český lev 2007
- 2009: Fakta Barbory Tachecí
- 2010: Rozmarná léta českého filmu
- 2010: E.ON Energy Globe Award ČR
- 2011: Český lev 2010

== Awards ==
- 2003: Trilobit Award by FITES (Film and Television Association), Prague, Czech Republic
- 2003: Boredom in Brno – Best Male Actor
- 2003: Boredom in Brno – Best script (co-authored with Vladimír Morávek)
- 2004: The Alfréd Radok Award (Ceny Alfréda Radoka) Best Actor for Mr. Stavrogin in The Devils (The Alfréd Radok Award in collaboration with the Aura–Pont agency and the magazine Svět a Divadlo (The World and Theatre) for achievements in Czech theatre
- 2004: Mistři (Champions) – Czech Lion – Best Supporting Actor
- 2005: Studio Hamburg Shooting Stars Award
- 2007: Václav – Czech Lion – Best Supporting Actor
- 2011: Novoměstský hrnec smíchu Festival (Nové Město nad Metují) – Best Male Actor – Czech Made Man

== Discography ==
Budař has composed over 50 songs in Czech, English and Spanish. He has also composed music for the films Boredom in Brno and Hrubeš and Mareš and for over 20 theatre performances. With his band Eliščin Band, Budař released four albums.

=== CDs ===
- Písně pro Hrubeše a Mareše, 2005
- Uletěl orlovi, 2006
- Proměna, 2008
- Lehce probuzený, 2012

=== DVDs ===
- Uletěl orlovi, 2006

=== Film music ===
- Rasistické historky, 2000
- Boredom in Brno, 2003
- Hrubeš a Mareš jsou kamarádi do deště, 2005
- Nebe a Vincek [TV film], 2008
- Hrubeš a Mareš Reloaded, 2009
- Protector, 2009
- Lidice, 2011

==== Books ====
2013 The fairy tales 'Největší Tajemství Leoplda Bumbáce'. The book is published with a fairy tale of Antonín Dočekal in Mladá fronta . 2017 Princ Mamánek
