= Tereza Vilišová =

Czech actress

Tereza Jarčevská Tereza Vilišová
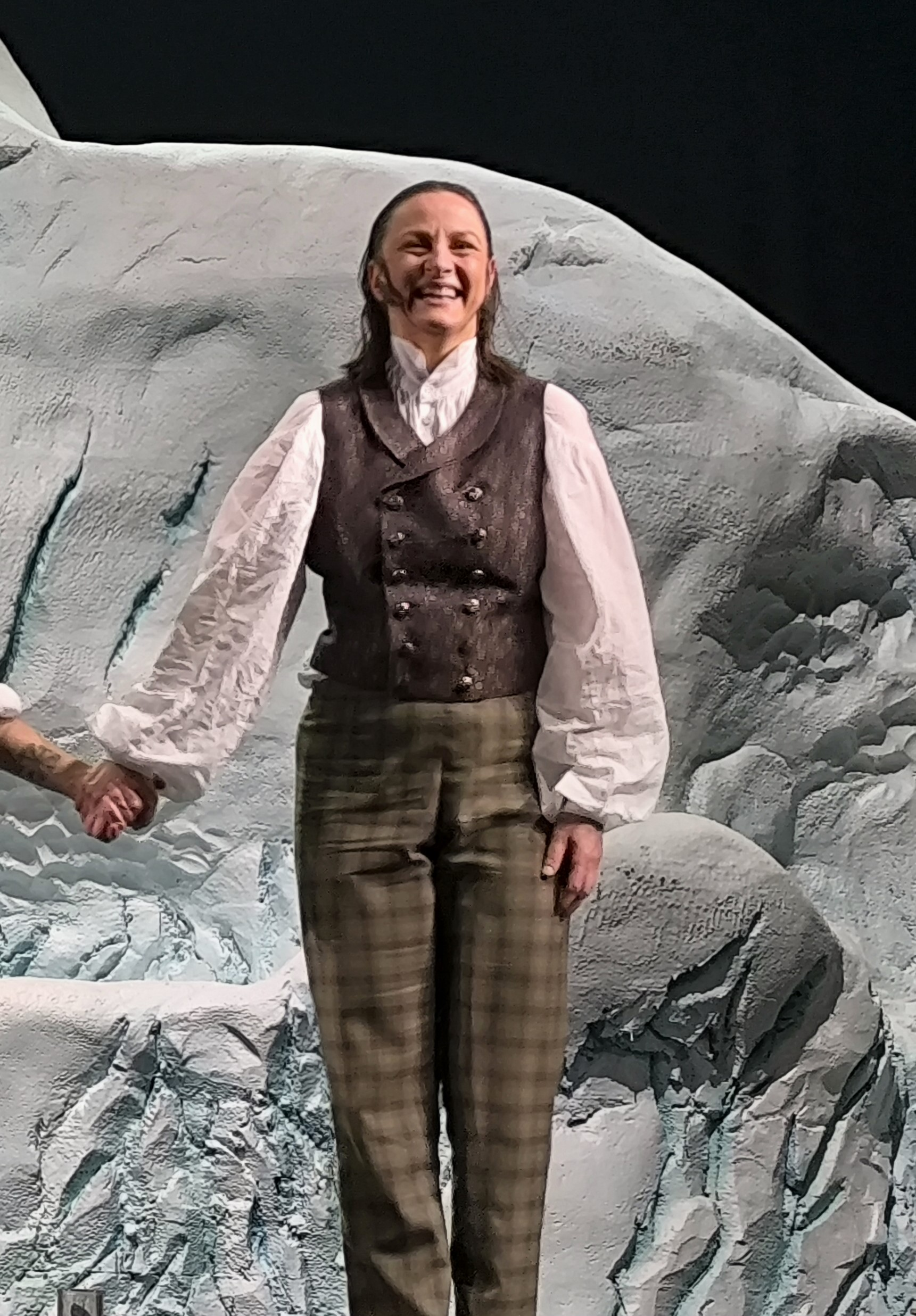
- Born: Tereza Vilišová; 30 January 1981 (age 45); Ostrava, Czechoslovakia
- Education: JAMU
- Occupation: Actress
- Years active: 2004–present
- Spouse: Petr Jarčevský

Tereza Vilišová, since 2016 Tereza Jarčevská (born 30 January 1981) is a Czech actress. She won the Alfréd Radok Award for Best Actress in 2013 for her role of Amy in the D C Jackson play My Romantic History at the Divadlo Petra Bezruče in Ostrava. At the 2013 Thalia Awards she won the category of Best Actress in a Play for the same work. Vilišová joined Prague's National Theatre in 2015.
