= Oldřich Daněk =

Oldřich Daněk (January 16, 1927 – September 3, 2000) was a Czech dramatist, writer, director and screenwriter.

== Education and Career ==
After graduating from high school in Ostrava, he studied at the Theatre Faculty of the Academy of Performing Arts in Prague (DAMU). From 1945, while still studying, he acted at the Divadlo Petra Bezruce in Ostrava. After completing his studies he became director of the Klicperovo Divadlo in Hradec Králové. From 1954 he was the artistic director/conductor of the F. X. Šaldy theatre in Liberec. From 1957 he worked at the Filmové Studio Barrandov, first as a film script author, and then later as a director. From 1973 onwards he devoted his life full-time to writing.

His dramas are predominantly moralistic; besides film and TV serials, he also wrote radio plays for broadcast.

== Works ==
=== Drama ===
- Umění odejít, 1955
- Čtyřicátý osmý, 1956
- Pohled do očí, 1959
- Svatba sňatkového podvodníka, 1961
- Máte rádi blázny?, 1962
- Čtyřicet omylů Herodesových, sometimes titled Čtyřicet zlosynů a jedno neviňátko, 1966
- Vrátím se do Prahy, 1969
- Dva na koni, jeden na oslu, 1971
- Hvězda jménem Praha, 1973
- Válka vypukne po přestávce, 1976
- Střelec, 1978
- Bitva na Moravském poli, 1979
- Vévodkyně valdštejnských vojsk, 1980
- Zpráva o chirurgii města N., 1981
- Životopis mého strýce, 1983
- Zdaleka ne tak ošklivá, jak se původně zdálo, 1983
- Vy jste Jan, 1987

=== Prose ===
- Král utíká z boje, 1967
- Únosce: Podivný den herce Krapka, 1967
- Král bez přilby, 1971
- Vražda v Olomouci, 1972, a novel
- Žhářky a požárnice, 1980
- Nedávno...: Útržky z běhu času, 1985, short stories

=== Film ===
- Zde jsou lvi, 1958, screenplay and direction
- Ošklivá slečna, 1959, screenplay
- Prosím nebudit, 1962, screenplay and direction
- Spanilá jízda, 1963
- Konec agenta W4C prostřednictvím psa pana Foustky, 1967
- Královský omyl, 1968, on the theme of his novel Král utíká z boje
- Byl jednou jeden dům, 1974, television series
- Dnes v jednom domě, 1978, television series

=== Directed for television ===
- Tři tuny prachu, 1960
- Lov na mamuta, 1963
- Muž v pralese, 1971, for television
- Raněný lučištník, 1974, for television
- Dva útržky ze života muže, 1976, for television
- Druhá první dáma, 1980, for television
- Žena z Korinta 1986, for television
- Španělé v Praze1988, for television
- Opouštět Petrohrad, 1990, for television
- Pilát Pontský, onoho dne, 1991
- Záskok pro Sissi, 1995

=== Screenplays for television ===
- Prometheus, 1958
- Pařížský kat, 1968
- Kardinál Zabarella, 1968,
- Břetislav a Jitka, 1974
- Cesta na Borneo, 1983
- Záviš a Kunhuta, 1985
- Bankovní dům Daubner, 1989

=== Radio plays ===
- Dialog v předvečer soudu, 1967
- Dialog s doprovodem děl,1967
- Jak se máte Vondrovi?, more parts
- Rozhovor v Delfách
- Blbý had
- Přepadení Národní banky
- Rudolfinská noc
- Vzpomínka na Hamleta
