= Martin Suchánek =

Martin Suchánek is a film director, photographer and screenwriter. He was born in 1958 in Mariánské Lázně, Czech Republic and studied at the Evening University of Photography, with Prof. Ján Šmok, in Prague from 1976-1977 and at the Film and TV School of the Academy of Performing Arts in Prague Section of Documentary Film from 1978–1983.
