= Vladimír Morávek =

Czech theatre director and scriptwriter (born 1965)

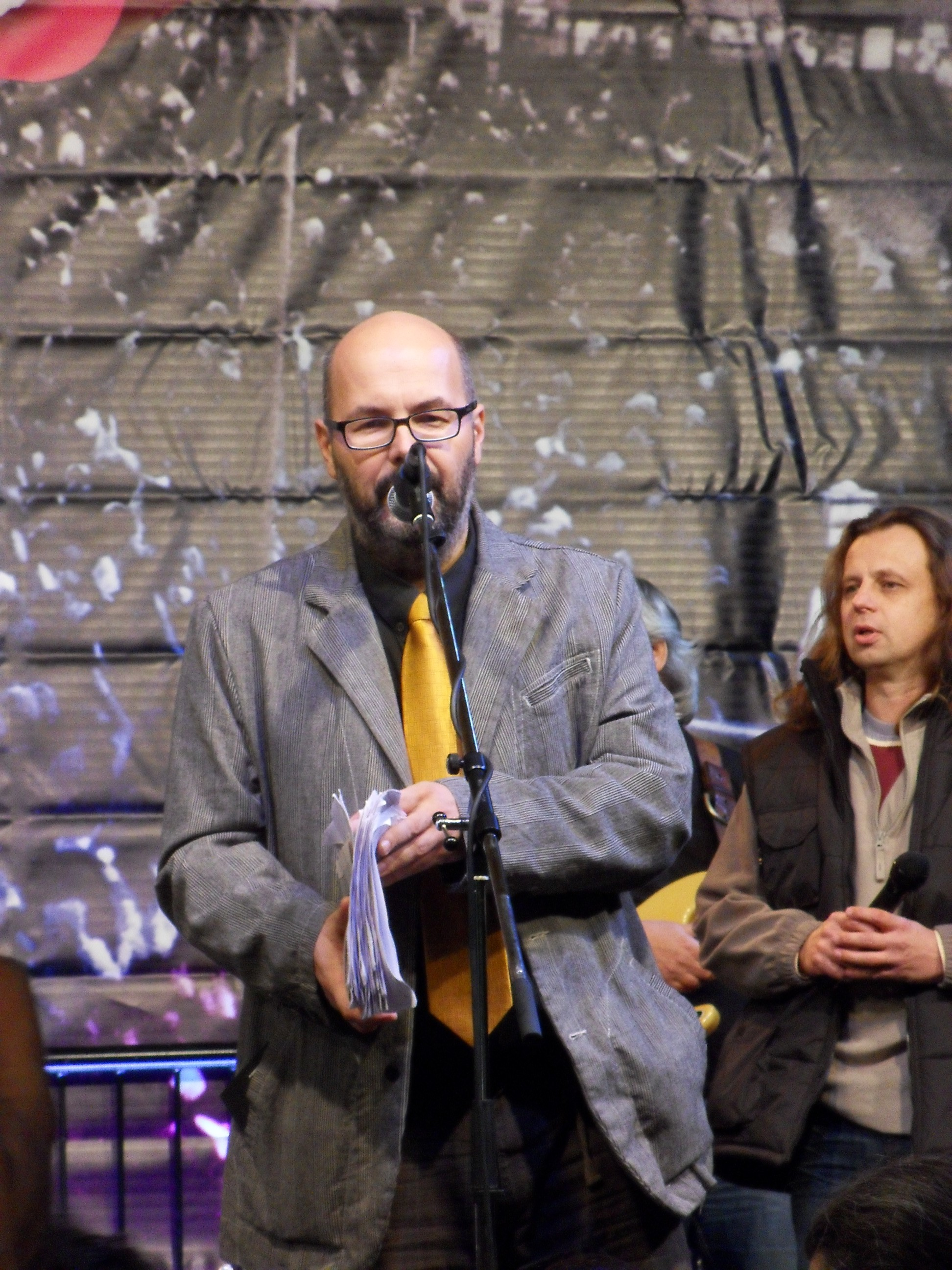
- Born: 9 April 1965; Moravský Krumlov
- Alma mater: Faculty of Theatre, Janáček Performing Arts Academy; Janáček Academy of Performing Arts
- Occupation: Film director; screenwriter; theatre director
- Employer: Divadlo Husa na provázku; Klicpera's Theater
- Awards: Czech Lion Award for Best Director (Boredom in Brno, 2003); Czech Lion Award for Best Screenplay (Boredom in Brno, 2003)

Vladimír Morávek (born 9 April 1965 in Moravský Krumlov) is a Czech theatre, film and television director, screenwriter and actor. His 2003 film Boredom in Brno won five Czech Lions. Between 1996 and 2005 he was art director of Klicperovo divadlo in Hradec Králové. Since 2005 he is the art director of Divadlo Husa na provázku.

== Selected filmography ==
Film
Year	Title	Role
2005	Hrubeš a Mareš jsou kamarádi do deště	director, screenwriter
2003	Nuda v Brně	director, screenwriter
