= National Theatre Ballet (Prague) =

General information
- Name: National Theatre Ballet (Prague)
- Year founded: 1883
- Principal venue: National Theatre (Prague)
- Website: Official Website

Senior staff
- Chief Executive: Martin Rypan

Artistic staff
- Artistic Director: Filip Barankiewicz

Other
- Orchestra: Prague National Theatre Orchestra
- Official school: National Theatre Ballet Preparatory School
- Formation: Principal; Soloist; Corps de Ballet

The National Theatre Ballet in Prague, Czech Republic was founded in 1883. It is based in Prague's National Theatre, which is also home to a drama company and an opera company. The company has a long history of performing Czech works in addition to international classics. In recent decades, more Western works have also been added to the repertoire.

== History ==
The National Theatre's first ballet master was Václav Reisinger. He worked with a group of more than 20 dancers, and staged a new ballet production in 1884, Hashish. Reisinger was succeeded by Augustin Berger, who held the post twice, from 1884 to 1900, and 1912 to 1923. Berger's contribution was to expand the company, adding a chorus of figurants (auxiliary dancers) and giving the company a more professional standard. The ballet company was successful in staging popular classics of the era, such as Swan Lake (Act II), Giselle, Coppélia and Excelsior. The National Theatre Ballet was the first company to stage Swan Lake outside of Russia, and Tchaikovsky himself was at the premiere of the Prague production.

During its first decades, the company was also a significant performer of local creations, such as Štědrovečerní sen (A Christmas Eve Dream, 1886), Kovařovic’s Pohádka o nalezeném štěstí (A Fairy Tale About Happiness Found) (1889), Janáček's Rákos Rákoczy (1891), Bajaja (1897), Jindřich Kàan z Albestů), and many works of children's entertainment.

Achille Viscusi was ballet master from 1902 to 1912, bringing an Italian influence to the company's training and performance style. Polish dancer and choreographer Remislav Remislavsky became ballet master in 1922, introducing a Russian influence, which became dominant for the company throughout the 20th century. Czech works staged in this period include Istar (1924), Doctor Faust (1926) and Who Is the Most Powerful in the World? (1927). Avant garde influences, even American Jazz music, added to the creative mixture at the National Theatre Ballet during this period. Bohuslav Martinů wrote a jazz score for Checkmating the King (1930), and Jaroslav Ježek added jazz influences to the score for Nerves (1928).

During the post-World War II era, the company grew in technical achievement. Saša Machov (1946–1951) and Jiří Němeček (1952–1969) were the artistic directors of this period. A new departure for the repertoire began in the 1960s, with the addition of modern, shorter pieces. Emerich Gabzdyl and Miroslav Kůra were artistic directors during the 1970s. Kůra's choreography for Romeo and Juliet proved to be immensely popular, and the ballet was filmed for cinema release.

Vlastimil Harapes became artistic director in 1990, and since that time, the company has expanded its repertoire to include "a modern type of full-length epic ballet", for example, Little Mr. Friedeman and Psycho (1993, 2000), Tchaikovsky (1994), Coppélia (1995), Isadora Duncan (1998), Some Like It… (1994, 2001) and Mowgli for Children (1996). The company's choreographer, Vladimir Lípor, has been key to these new productions.

During the early 20th century, the company has staged works choreographed by Jiří Kylián, John Cranko and Glen Tetley.

== National Theatre Ballet Preparatory School ==
Formal ballet education for children in Prague began in 1835, when a school was established at the Estates Theatre. A school was established at the National Theatre in 1883, and existed sporadically until the 1950s. The school was re-established in 1953, with a curriculum developed by Olga Ilyina Alexandrovna, which is still in use. Many professional dancers have trained at the school. Pupils often progress to the Prague Dance Conservatory.

== See also ==
- Ballet company
- Czech culture
- Glossary of ballet
