= List of Czech films of the 1950s =

A List of Czech films of the 1950s.

== Films by year ==
=== 1950 ===
Title	Director	Cast	Genre	Notes
The Great Opportunity	Karel Michael Wallo	Vlasta Chramostová, Vladimír Smeral, Jirí Vrstála	Drama	
Steam Above a Pot	Miroslav Cikán			
Temno				
The Trap	Martin Frič	Vladimír Ráž, Vlasta Chramostová	War/drama	Entered into the 1951 Cannes Film Festival

=== 1951 ===
Title	Director	Cast	Genre	Notes
DS-70 nevyjíždí				
The Struggle Will End Tomorrow	Miroslav Cikán	Elo Romančík, Vladimír Petruška	Drama	

=== 1952 ===
Title	Director	Cast	Genre	Notes
Dovolená s Andělem	Bořivoj Zeman	Jaroslav Marvan, Josef Kemr, Vladimír Ráž, Jana Dítětová	Comedy	
Operation B	Josef Mach	Antonie Hegerlíková, Vlasta Chramostová, Josef Bek	War drama	
The Proud Princess	Bořivoj Zeman	Vladimír Ráž, Alena Vránová, Stanislav Neumann	Fairytale	Based on a novel by Božena Němcová.
We Love	Václav Kubásek	František Peterka, Jaroslav Průcha, Frantisek Hanuš	Drama	

=== 1953 ===
Title	Director	Cast	Genre	Notes
Anna proletářka	Karel Steklý	Marie Tomášová, Josef Bek, Jana Dítětová	Drama	
Měsíc nad řekou	Václav Krška	Dana Medřická, Alena Vránová		
Olověný chléb				
A Warning	Miroslav Cikán			

=== 1954 ===
Title	Director	Cast	Genre	Notes
Byl jednou jeden král	Bořivoj Zeman	Jan Werich, 37.Vlasta Burian, Milena Dvorská	Fairy-tale	Based on the novel Sůl nad zlato by Božena Němcová
Cirkus bude				
Dva mrazíci	Jiří Trnka	Jan Werich-voice, 38.Vlasta Burian-voice	Animated	
Komedianti	Vladimír Vlcek			Entered into the 1954 Cannes Film Festival

=== 1955 ===
Title	Director	Cast	Genre	Notes
Muž v povětří	Miroslav Cikán	Vlasta Burian, Alena Vránová	Comedy	
Na konci mesta	Miroslav Cikán			
Cesta do pravěku (Journey to primeval times)	Karel Zeman	Vladimír Bejval, Petr Herrmann, Josef Lukáš, Zdeněk Husták	Sci-fi	
Anděl na horách	Bořivoj Zeman	Jaroslav Marvan, Josef Kemr, Vladimír Ráž, Jana Dítětová	Comedy	
Psohlavci	Martin Frič	Vladimír Ráž, Miloš Nedbal, Miloš Kopecký	Historical/drama	Entered into the 1955 Cannes Film Festival
Nejlepší člověk	Václav Wasserman, Ivo Novák	Vlasta Burian	Comedy	

=== 1956 ===
Title	Director	Cast	Genre	Notes
Dalibor	Václav Krška			Entered into the 1956 Cannes Film Festival
Ztracenci (Lost Children)	Miloš Makovec	Stanislav Fišer, Radovan Lukavský, Alena Vránová	War/drama	Entered into the 1957 Cannes Film Festival
Muž v povětří	Miroslav Cikán			
Robinsonka				

=== 1957 ===
Title	Director	Cast	Genre	Notes
Florenc 13:30	Josef Mach	Josef Bek, Dana Medřická		
Jurásek	Miroslav Cikán			
Škola otců				

=== 1958 ===
Title	Director	Cast	Genre	Notes
The Fabulous World of Jules Verne (Vynález zkázy)	Karel Zeman	Lubor Tokoš, Arnošt Navrátil	Sci-fi	Combined feature and animated film. Winner of numerous international prizes including the French Academy Crystal Award, Grand Prix du EXPO 58, 1962 Hugo Award nominee
Suburban Romance	Zbyněk Brynych	Jana Brejchová, Eduard Cupák, František Kreuzmann		Entered into the 1958 Cannes Film Festival
Páté kolo u vozu	Bořivoj Zeman			
Desire	Vojtěch Jasný	Jana Brejchová, Vlastimil Brodský		1959 Golden Palm nominee & "best selection" winner
St. Peter's Umbrella	Frigyes Bán	Mari Törőcsik, Sándor Pécsi	Drama	Co-production with Hungary

=== 1959 ===
Title	Director	Cast	Genre	Notes
Král Šumavy				
A Midsummer Night's Dream	Jiří Trnka	Animated, English language (Richard Burton - Narrator)		1959 Golden Palm nominee & "best selection - short film" winner
Kam čert nemůže	Zdeněk Podskalský	Miroslav Horníček, Jana Hlaváčová, Vlastimil Brodský		Entered into the 1960 Cannes Film Festival
Útek ze stínu	Jiří Sequens			Entered into the 1st Moscow International Film Festival
