= Cinema of the Czech Republic =

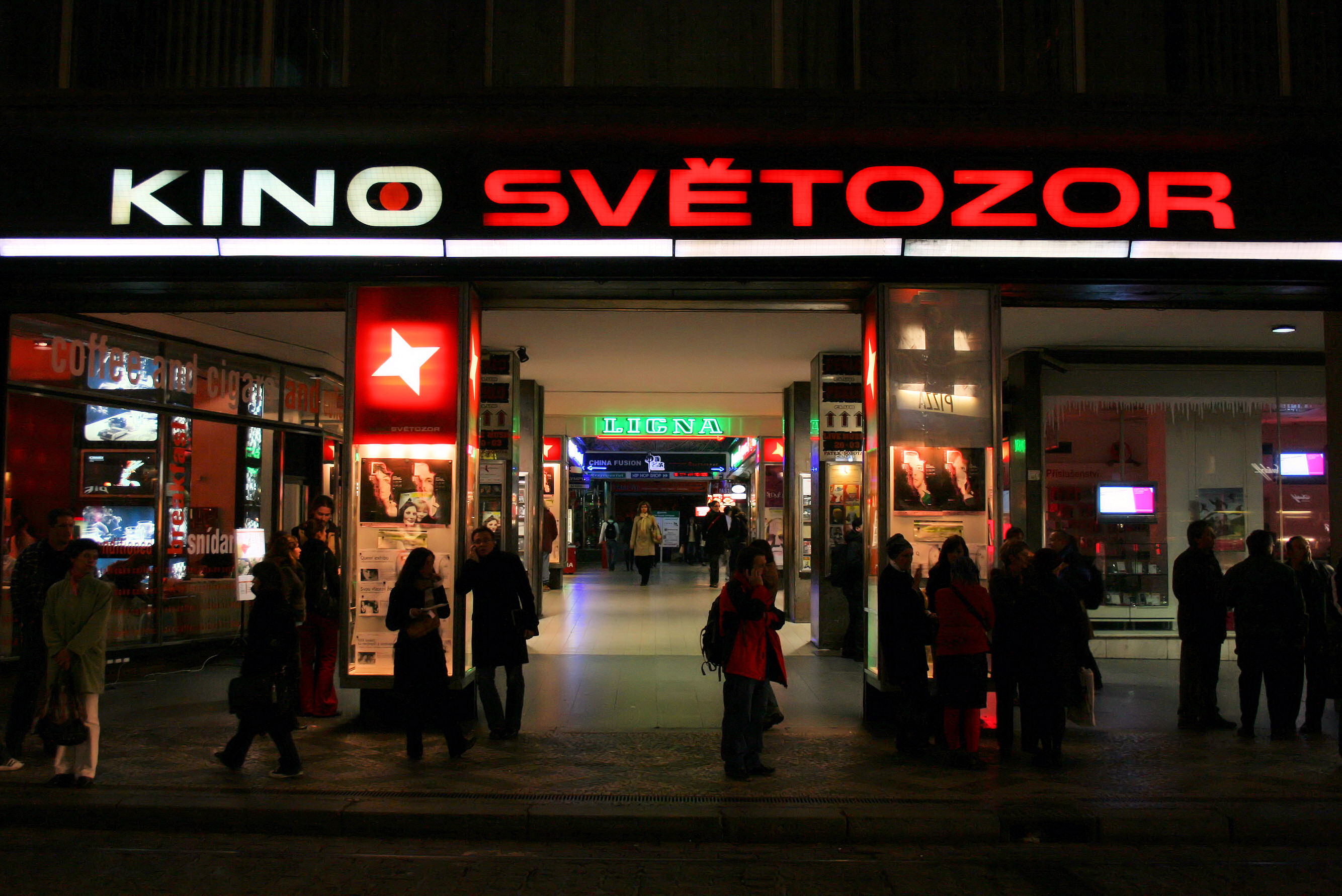
- Kino Světozor in Prague
- No. of screens: 606 (2022)
  - Per capita: 5.8 per 100,000 (2022)
- Main distributors: Falcon 27.8% CinemArt 21.2% Vertical 19.7% Bontonfilm 9.0%

Produced feature films (2025)
- Total: 49

Number of admissions (2025)
- Total: 12,605,093
  - Per capita: 1.19
- National films: 2,762,097 (27,3%)

Gross box office (2025)
- Total: CZK 2.27 billion
- National films: CZK 493 million (21.7%)

Czech cinema comprises the cinema of the Czech Republic as well as contributions to cinema by Czech people during the Austrian-Hungarian Empire period.

The earliest Czech cinema began in 1898 with Jan Kříženecký, later major contributions were made by interwar directors such as Karel Lamač and Martin Frič, with Barrandov Studios founded in 1933. During WWII, filmmakers like Otakar Vávra continued working despite Nazi occupation.

In the Post-war period, the industry was nationalized, with The Proud Princess (1952) becoming a record hit. Domestically, the most viewed Czech film ever, it was seen by 8 million people. The 1958 film The Fabulous World of Jules Verne by Karel Zeman is considered the most internationally successful Czech film ever made; soon after its release it was distributed to 72 countries and received widespread attention.

The 1960s saw the Czechoslovak New Wave emerge, featuring directors Miloš Forman and Jiří Menzel. The 1970s–80s focused on comedies and family films. In the 1990s, Marketa Lazarová was voted the all-time best Czech movie in a poll of Czech film critics and publicists.

== History ==
The first Czech film director and cinematographer was Jan Kříženecký, who started filming short documentaries in Prague in the second half of 1898. The first permanent cinema house was founded by Viktor Ponrepo in 1907 in Prague.

Some early findings enabling the birth of cinematography were made by Czech scientists in the 19th century such as by Jan Evangelista Purkyně.

=== Interwar period ===
Among the prominent directors were Karel Lamač, Karl Anton, Svatopluk Innemann, Přemysl Pražský, Martin Frič and Gustav Machatý. The first Czechoslovak film fully made with synchronized sound is considered to be Když struny lkají, released in September 1930. Tonka of the Gallows, released in February 1930, was shot as a silent film and the sound was added in France. Barrandov Studios was launched by Miloš Havel in 1933, which started a Czech film industry film boom. It is the largest film studio in the country and one of the larger in Europe.

=== World War II ===
During World War II, many major pre-war film directors continued to make films, including Otakar Vávra, Martin Frič, Miroslav Cikán, Jan Sviták (who was killed at the end of the war by an anti-fascist mob), Vladimír Slavínský, František Čáp, Zdeněk Gina Hašler (who emigrated to the USA after the war) and Václav Binovec.

Vladimír Čech and Václav Krška started their careers during World War II. Scenario writer Karel Steklý turned to film directing at the end of the war and maintained both careers until his death.

Well-known actor Rudolf Hrušínský (born 1920) also directed films during this period.

=== After World War II ===
Many prominent people of Czech cinema left the country before World War II including directors Karel Lamač and Gustav Machatý, cinematographer Otto Heller, actors Hugo Haas and Jiří Voskovec and producer Josef Auerbach. Director Vladislav Vančura was murdered by Nazis as were popular actor and signer Karel Hašler, actress Anna Letenská and writer Karel Poláček. Studio owner Miloš Havel and actresses Lída Baarová and Adina Mandlová went into exile in Germany or Austria after they were accused of collaborating with Nazis during the war. In 1943, Czech Film Archive (NFA) was established in Prague.

In 1945, the Czechoslovak film industry was nationalized. The Proud Princess, the most viewed Czech film ever, was released in 1952. It was seen by 8,222,695 people. The film also won a prize for a child film at Karlovy Vary International Film Festival.

Famous movies of the 1950s include Journey to the Beginning of Time, The Good Soldier Švejk, The Emperor and the Golem, The Princess with the Golden Star, The Fabulous World of Jules Verne, The Proud Princess (the most viewed Czech film ever) and Once Upon a Time, There Was a King....

=== New Wave ===
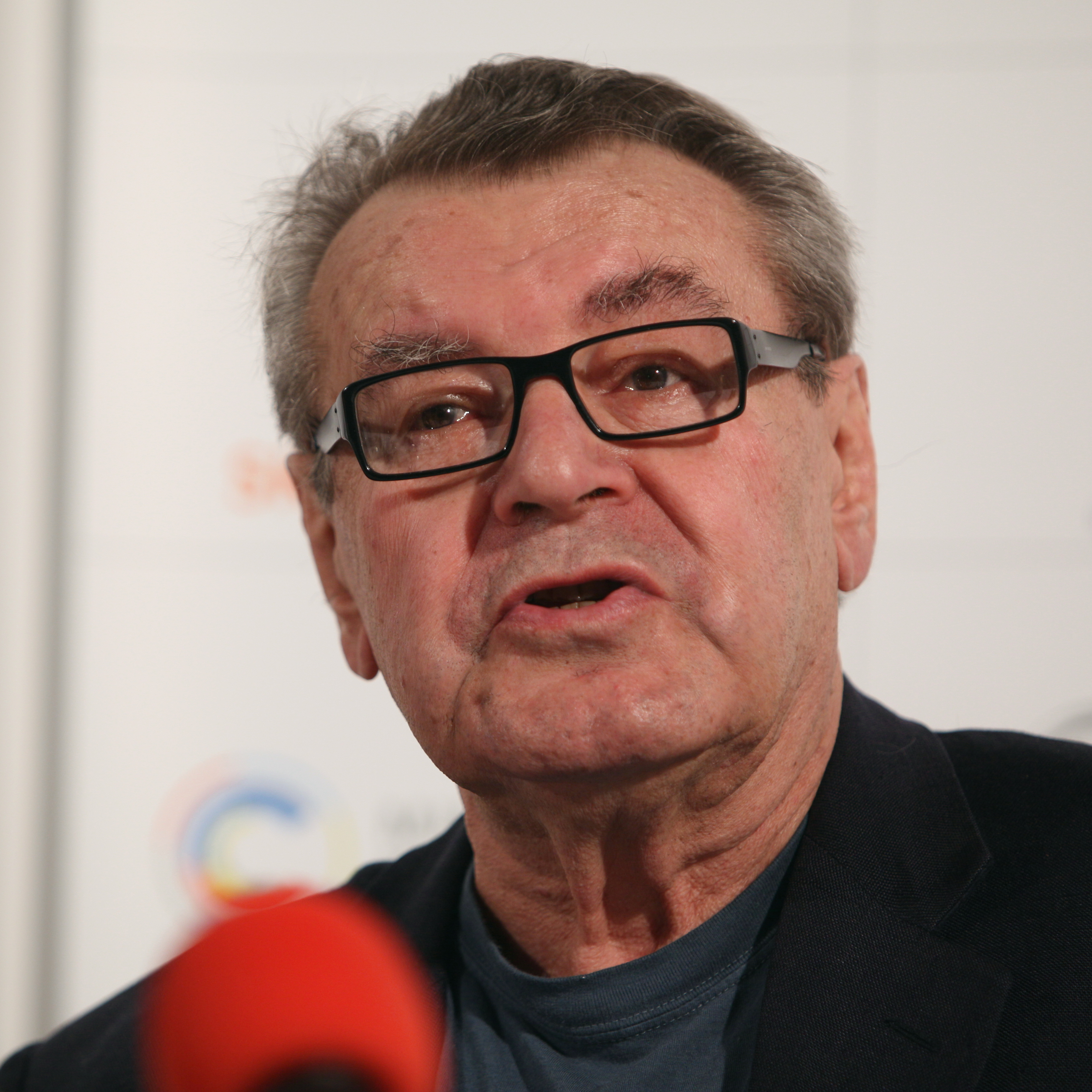
Miloš Forman

The Czechoslovak New Wave frequently is associated with the early works of directors such as Miloš Forman, Věra Chytilová, Jiří Menzel and others, but works by older, established Czechoslovak directors such as Karel Kachyňa and Vojtěch Jasný are placed in this category. Encompassing a broad range of works in the early to mid-1960s, the Czechoslovak New Wave cannot be categorized to any one style or approach to filmmaking. Examples range from highly stylised, even avant-garde, literary adaptions using historical themes (e.g. Jan Němec's Diamonds of the Night (Démanty noci)) to semi-improvised comedies with contemporary subjects and amateur actors (e.g., Miloš Forman's The Firemen's Ball (Hoří, má panenko)). However, a frequent feature of films from this period was absurd, black humour and an interest in the concerns of ordinary people, particularly when faced with larger historical or political changes. The acid western comedy film Lemonade Joe was a famous parody of old-time westerns. Cinematic influences included Italian neorealism and the French New Wave, but the Czechoslovak New Wave also builds organically on developments in Czechoslovak cinema in the late 1950s when the influence of Stalinism in the film industry declined.

=== 1970s to 1989 ===
After August 21st, 1968 and the invasion of Russian troops, many films were banned and ended-up in vault, many filmmakers left Czechoslovakia (Miloš Forman, Pavel Juráček, Vojtěch Jasný, Jan Němec, Karel Vachek) or were not able to continue in their creative work (Věra Chytilová, Evald Schorm). Many of the directors active in the previous periods continued to work in this period, including Otakar Vávra and Jiří Menzel. During the period of normalization, only the movies that Czech authorities considered harmless were made. Therefore the most successful movies from this era are comedies, sci-fi and family movies, like in the previous periods. Three Wishes for Cinderella, a fairy-tale film from 1973, became a holiday classic in Czechoslovakia and several European countries, including Germany, Switzerland, Spain, Sweden and Norway.

=== 1990s and beyond ===
Successful Czech films made after the Velvet Revolution include Kolya, Divided We Fall, Cosy Dens and Walking Too Fast. In the 1990s, Marketa Lazarová was voted the all-time best Czech movie in a 1998 poll of Czech film critics and publicists.

== List of Czech films ==
- List of Czechoslovak films 1898–1990
- List of Czech films (List of Czech Republic films) 1990–today
- List of Czech animated films
- List of Czech films considered the best
- List of most expensive Czech films
- List of highest-grossing Czech films

== List of notable Czech directors ==
- Karl Anton
- Jiří Barta a stop-motion animation director
- Hynek Bočan
- František Čáp
- Věra Chytilová
- Miroslav Cikán
- František Čáp
- Vladimír Čech
- Frank Daniel
- Miloš Forman, twice won the Academy Award
- Martin Frič
- Saša Gedeon
- Hugo Haas
- Ladislav Helge
- Juraj Herz
- Jan Hřebejk
- Svatopluk Innemann
- Vojtěch Jasný
- Jaromil Jireš
- Pavel Juráček
- Karel Kachyňa
- Jan S. Kolár
- Jiří Krejčík
- Václav Krška
- Karel Lamač
- Oldřich Lipský
- Gustav Machatý
- Jiří Menzel, won the Academy Award
- Jan Němec
- Ivan Passer
- Břetislav Pojar
- Jindřich Polák
- Přemysl Pražský
- Alfred Radok
- Karel Reisz, Czech-born British director
- Josef Rovenský
- Evald Schorm
- Bohdan Sláma
- Karel Steklý
- Jan Sviták
- Jan Švankmajer
- Jan Svěrák, twice won the Academy Award
- Jiří Trnka, puppet motion-picture animator
- Hermína Týrlová
- Otakar Vávra
- František Vláčil, his film Marketa Lazarová was voted the all-time best Czech movie
- Václav Vorlíček
- Jiří Weiss
- Petr Zelenka
- Karel Zeman

== Nominations and awards ==
=== Nominations for Academy Award for Best Foreign Language film ===
- 1965 - The Shop on Main Street by Ján Kadár and Elmar Klos - Won Academy Award for Best Foreign Language film
- 1966 - Loves of a Blonde by Miloš Forman
- 1967 - Closely Watched Trains by Jiří Menzel - Won Academy Award for Best Foreign Language film
- 1968 - The Firemen's Ball by Miloš Forman
- 1986 - My Sweet Little Village by Jiří Menzel
- 1991 - The Elementary School by Jan Svěrák
- 1996 - Kolya by Jan Svěrák - Won Academy Award for Best Foreign Language film
- 2000 - Divided We Fall by Jan Hřebejk
- 2003 - Želary by Ondřej Trojan

=== Contenders at Cannes Film Festival ===
- 1946 - Men Without Wings by František Čáp - Won Palm d'Or
- 1946 - Vánoční sen by Karel Zeman - Won Grand Prix International for best short fiction film
- 1946 - Springman and the SS by Jiří Trnka
- 1951 - The Trap by Martin Frič
- 1954 - A Drop Too Much by Břetislav Pojar - Won Best Puppet Film
- 1955 - Dog's Heads by Martin Frič
- 1955 - The Good Soldier Schweik by Jiří Trnka
- 1956 - Dalibor by Václav Krška
- 1956 - The Dolls of Jiří Trnka by Bruno Šefranka - Won Special Mention - Short Film
- 1957 - Lost Children by Miloš Makovec
- 1958 - Suburban Romance by Zbyněk Brynych
- 1958 - Než nám narostla křídla by Jiří Brdečka - Won Special Prize for Short Film
- 1959 - Desire by Vojtěch Jasný
- 1959 - Butterflies Don't Live Here by Miro Bernat - Won Palme d'Or for Best Short Film
- 1960 - When the Woman Butts In by Zdeněk Podskalský
- 1960 - Pozor by Jiří Brdečka
- 1961 - Fantazie pro levou ruku a lidské svědomí by Pavel Hobl
- 1962 - Man in Outer Space by Oldřich Lipský
- 1962 - Člověk pod vodou by Jiří Brdečka
- 1963 - The Cassandra Cat by Vojtěch Jasný - Won Special Jury Prize
- 1963 - Železničáři by Evald Schorm
- 1964 - The Cry by Jaromil Jireš
- 1964 - Flora nese smrt by Jiří Papoušek
- 1965 - The Shop on Main Street by Ján Kadár and Elmar Klos - Won Special Mention for actors
- 1965 - Johann Sebastian Bach: Fantasy in G minor by Jan Švankmajer - Won Prix du Jury for Short Film
- 1966 - The Pipes by Vojtěch Jasný
- 1966 - Číslice by Pavel Procházka
- 1967 - Hotel for Strangers by Antonín Máša
- 1968 - A Report on the Party and the Guests by Jan Němec
- 1968 - The Firemen's Ball by Miloš Forman
- 1969 - End of a Priest by Evald Schorm
- 1969 - All My Compatriots by Vojtěch Jasný - Won Best Director
- 1969 - Moc osudu by Jiří Brdečka
- 1970 - Fruit of Paradise by Věra Chytilová
- 1972 - Hvězda Betlémská by Hermína Týrlová
- 1974 - Leonarduv deník by Jan Švankmajer
- 1980 - Krychle by Zdeněk Smetana - Won Jury Prize for Short Film
- 1981 - Diskžokej by Jiří Barta
- 1981 - Král a skřítek by Lubomír Beneš
- 1989 - Manly Games by Jan Švankmajer
- 1990 - The Ear by Karel Kachyňa
- 1990 - Portrét by Pavel Koutský
- 1990 - Time of the Servants by Irena Pavlásková - Caméra d'Or - Special Mention

=== Contenders at Venice Film Festival ===
- 1934 - Ecstasy by Gustav Machatý - Won Best Director
- 1934 - The River by Josef Rovenský - Won Best Director
- 1934 - Bouře nad Tatrami by Tomáš Trnka - Won Best Director
- 1934 - Maryša by Josef Rovenský - Won Special Recommendation
- 1937 - Batalion by Miroslav Cikán - Won Special Recommendation
- 1939 - Humoreska by Otakar Vávra
- 1939 - Macoun the Tramp by Ladislav Brom
- 1939 - Sklenice i chléb by Jaroslav Tuzar
- 1940 - Muž z neznáma by Martin Frič
- 1941 - Nocturnal Butterfly by František Čáp - Won Targa di segnalazione
- 1947 - Capek's Tales by Martin Frič
- 1947 - The Czech Year by Jiří Trnka
- 1947 - The Strike by Karel Steklý - Won Golden Lion
- 1955 - From My Life by Václav Krška
- 1958 - The Wolf Trap by Jiří Weiss - Won New Cinema Award and FIPRESCI Prize
- 1963 - The Golden Fern by Jiří Weiss
- 1963 - Mud Covered City by Václav Táborský - Won Lion of San Marco for Best Documentary
- 1965 - Loves of a Blonde by Miloš Forman
- 1965 - Útěk do větru by Václav Táborský - Won Lion of San Marco
- 1966 - Ptáci koháci by Jiří Torman - Won Plate
- 1966 - Krtek a raketa by Zdeněk Miler - Won Recreative Children's Film
- 1969 - Čest a sláva by Hynek Bočan - Won Best Foreign Film
- 1981 - Cutting It Short by Jiří Menzel
- 1990 - Martha and I by Jiří Weiss
- 2019 - The Painted Bird by Václav Marhoul

=== Contenders at Moscow Film Festival ===
- 1935 - Workers, Let's Go by Martin Frič - Special jury prize for actors Jiří Voskovec and Jan Werich
- 1959 - Escape from the Shadows by Jiří Sequens - Golden Medal
- 1961 - Fetters by Karel Kachyňa
- 1963 - Death Is Called Engelchen by Ján Kadár and Elmar Klos - Golden Prize
- 1965 - Atentát by Jiří Sequens - Golden Prize
- 1967 - Romance for Bugle by Otakar Vávra - Special Silver Prize

== See also ==
- Czech Lion - Annual awards of Czech Film and Television Academy
- Barrandov Studios - Prague's film studios
- Karlovy Vary International Film Festival
- Finále Plzeň Film Festival - Film Festival of Czech and Slovak films
- Film Festival Zlín - International Film Festival for Children and Youth
- Czechoslovak New Wave
- List of films Czech films considered the best
- List of Czech Academy Award winners and nominees
- Cinema of the world
