= Bořivoj Zeman =

Czech Filmmaker

- Born: 6 March 1912; Prague, Bohemia, Austria-Hungary
- Died: 23 December 1991 (aged 79); Prague, Czechoslovakia
- Occupation: Film director

Bořivoj Zeman (6 March 1912 – 23 December 1991) was a Czech film director and screenwriter.

== Biography ==
Originally a clerk by profession, he started by writing short film scripts just for himself. His real film work began in 1940's in Hostivař Studios in Prague, as well as in film studios in Zlín, where he worked briefly with Karel Zeman, whom he assisted in directing a 1945 short film A Christmas Dream. However, he is mainly known for his two comedies Dovolená s Andělem and Anděl na horách, both starring Jaroslav Marvan in a role of an auditor of Prague public transport companies.

In addition to his film comedies, he is also known for his work for children. He made the first movie fairy tale in Czechoslovakia, The Proud Princess, starring Vladimír Ráž and Alena Vránová. His next work was Byl jednou jeden král… based on the fairy tale by Božena Němcová, Sůl nad zlato, starring Jan Werich, Vlasta Burian and Milena Dvorská. In 1968, he made another film fairy tale The Incredibly Sad Princess, starring popular singers Helena Vondráčková and Václav Neckář. The movie was later televised in the United Kingdom as The Madly Sad Princess by BBC. He also made the film parody The Phantom of Morrisville, starring Oldřich Nový and singer Waldemar Matuška.

His first wife was Alena Santarová, an author of books for children. She was a daughter of Vladislav Vančura.

== Selected works ==
- Dovolená s Andělem (1952)
- The Proud Princess (1952)
- Byl jednou jeden král… (1954)
- Anděl na horách (1955)
- Páté kolo u vozu (1958)
- The Phantom of Morrisville (1966)
- The Incredibly Sad Princess (1968)
- Ženy v ofsajdu (1971)
- Honza málem králem (1976)
