= List of Czech films considered the best =

This article shows notable survey—either by critics or by the public of best Czech films. Some surveys focus on all Czech films, while others focus on a particular genre. It can be the highest ranked Czech exponent of an international poll.

== Best film overall ==
This section shows results of Best Czech film polls.

=== Film critics ===
1994 Karlovy Vary International Film Festival survey

Num	Film	Director	Genre
1	Marketa Lazarová (1967)	František Vláčil	Historical

1998 poll of 55 Czech and Slovak film critics and publicists

Num	Film	Director	Genre	Points
1	Marketa Lazarová (1967)	František Vláčil	Historical	325
2	The Shop on Main Street (1965)	Ján Kadár and Elmar Klos	War drama	252
3	All My Compatriots (1968)	Vojtěch Jasný	Drama	222
4	The Firemen's Ball (1967)	Miloš Forman	Comedy, Drama	163
5	Intimate Lighting (1965)	Ivan Passer	Comedy, Drama	134
6	Distant Journey (1949)	Alfréd Radok	War, drama	122
7	Diamonds of the Night (1964)	Jan Němec	War, Drama	121
7	Closely Watched Trains (1966)	Jiří Menzel	War, drama	121
8	The Cremator (1968)	Juraj Herz	Horror	79
9	Case for a Rookie Hangman (1969)	Pavel Juráček	Mystery	71
10	The Ear (1970)	Karel Kachyňa	Thriller	68

Filmové dědictví 2007

Num	Film	Director	Genre	Points
1	The Firemen's Ball (1967)	Miloš Forman	Comedy, Drama	33
2	Marketa Lazarová (1967)	František Vláčil	Historical	32
2	The Shop on Main Street (1965)	Ján Kadár and Elmar Klos	War drama	32
3	Closely Watched Trains (1966)	Jiří Menzel	War, drama	31
3	The Cremator (1968)	Juraj Herz	Horror	31
4	Intimate Lighting (1965)	Ivan Passer	Comedy, Drama	30
5	Lemonade Joe (1964)	Oldřich Lipský	Western, Comedy	29
5	Case for a Rookie Hangman (1969)	Pavel Juráček	Mystery	29
5	All My Compatriots (1968)	Vojtěch Jasný	Drama	29
6	Ecstasy (1932)	Gustav Machatý	Romantic, Drama	28
6	The Valley of the Bees (1967)	František Vláčil	Historical	28
7	Diamonds of the Night (1964)	Jan Němec	War, Drama	27
7	Loves of a Blonde (1965)	Miloš Forman	Comedy, Romance, Drama	27
8	Daisies (1966)	Věra Chytilová	Comedy, Drama	26
9	Distant Journey (1949)	Alfréd Radok	War, drama	25
9	Coach to Vienna (1966)	Karel Kachyňa	Psychological, War, drama	25
9	A Report on the Party and the Guests (1966)	Jan Němec	Political satire	25
9	Romance for Bugle (1967)	Otakar Vávra	Romantic, Drama	25
10	Adelheid (1969)	František Vláčil	Psychological, drama	24
10	Black Peter (1963)	Miloš Forman	Comedy, Drama	24
10	~~Pictures of the Old World (1972)~~	~~Dušan Hanák~~	~~Documentary~~	~~24~~
10	~~The Sun in a Net (1963)~~	~~Štefan Uher~~	~~Drama~~	~~24~~
10	Hop Pickers (1964)	Ladislav Rychman	Romantic Musical	24
10	The Ear (1970)	Karel Kachyňa	Thriller	24
10	The Joke (1968)	Jaromil Jireš	Drama	24

Reflex Poll 2011

Num	Film	Director	Genre
1	Marketa Lazarová (1967)	František Vláčil	Historical
2	The Cremator (1968)	Juraj Herz	Horror
3	Diamonds of the Night (1964)	Jan Němec	War, Drama
4	All My Compatriots (1968)	Vojtěch Jasný	Drama
5	Black Peter (1963)	Miloš Forman	Comedy, Drama
6	Case for a Rookie Hangman (1969)	Pavel Juráček	Mystery
7	Ball Lightning (1978)	Ladislav Smoljak, Zdeněk Podskalský	Comedy
8	The Poacher's Foster Daughter or Noble Millionaire (1949)	Martin Frič	Comedy
9	The Elementary School (1991)	Jan Svěrák	Comedy
10	Closely Watched Trains (1966)	Jiří Menzel	War, drama

Sight & Sound Poll 2012

Num	Film	Director	Genre	points	Source
1	Marketa Lazarová (1967)	František Vláčil	Historical	11	
2	Daisies (1966)	Věra Chytilová	Comedy, Drama	8	
3	Closely Watched Trains (1966)	Jiří Menzel	War, drama	5	
4	Alice (1988)	Jan Švankmajer	Animation, Fantasy	3	
5	Dimensions of Dialogue (1982)	Jan Švankmajer	Animation	2	
5	Intimate Lighting (1965)	Ivan Passer	Comedy, Drama	2	

Kánon 100 - voting by 20 Czech film critics and historians in 2018

Num	Film	Director	Genre
1	The Firemen's Ball (1967)	Miloš Forman	Comedy, Drama
2	Daisies (1966)	Věra Chytilová	Comedy, Drama
3	Distant Journey (1949)	Alfréd Radok	War, drama
4	Marketa Lazarová (1967)	František Vláčil	Historical
5	Diamonds of the Night (1964)	Jan Němec	War, Drama
6	The Cremator (1968)	Juraj Herz	Horror
7	The Shop on Main Street (1965)	Ján Kadár and Elmar Klos	War drama
8	All My Compatriots (1968)	Vojtěch Jasný	Drama
9	From Saturday to Sunday (1931)	Gustav Machatý	Comedy
10	Kouř (1991)	Tomáš Vorel	Musical, Comedy

=== Public polls ===
Filmové dědictví 2007

Num	Film	Director	Genre	Points
1	The Elementary School (1991)	Jan Svěrák	Comedy	192
2	My Sweet Little Village (1985)	Jiří Menzel	Comedy	182
3	Journey to the Beginning of Time (1955)	Karel Zeman	Adventure, Science Fiction	179
4	The Cremator (1968)	Juraj Herz	Horror	177
5	Kolya (1996)	Jan Svěrák	Comedy	164
6	Cosy Dens (1999)	Jan Hřebejk	Comedy	156
7	Closely Watched Trains (1966)	Jiří Menzel	War, drama	153
8	Witchhammer (1969)	Otakar Vávra	Historical	146
9	The Firemen's Ball (1967)	Miloš Forman	Comedy, Drama	140
9	Lemonade Joe (1964)	Oldřich Lipský	Western, Comedy	140
10	The Inheritance or Fuckoffguysgoodday (1992)	Věra Chytilová	Comedy	131

Media Desk Poll 2010

Num	Film	Director	Genre
1	Christian (1939)	Martin Frič	Comedy
2	Cesta do hlubin študákovy duše (1939)	Martin Frič	Comedy
3	Eva Fools Around (1939)	Martin Frič	Comedy
4	U pokladny stál (1939)	Karel Lamač	Comedy
5	Marketa Lazarová (1967)	František Vláčil	Historical
6	The Cremator (1968)	Juraj Herz	Horror
7	Lemonade Joe (1964)	Oldřich Lipský	Western, Comedy
8	My Sweet Little Village (1985)	Jiří Menzel	Comedy
9	Waiter, Scarper! (1981)	Ladislav Smoljak	Crime, Comedy
10	Skeleton on Horseback (1937)	Hugo Haas	Science Fiction, Drama

Reflex Poll 2011

Num	Film	Director	Genre	Points
1	Cosy Dens (1999)	Jan Hřebejk	Comedy	622
2	The Cremator (1968)	Juraj Herz	Horror	495
3	My Sweet Little Village (1985)	Jiří Menzel	Comedy	491
4	Men about Town (1969)	Zdeněk Podskalský	Comedy	286
5	Seclusion Near a Forest (1976)	Jiří Menzel	Comedy	226
6	All My Compatriots (1968)	Vojtěch Jasný	Drama	217
7	Marecek, Pass Me the Pen! (1976)	Oldřich Lipský	Comedy	201
8	Give the Devil His Due (1984)	Hynek Bočan	Adventure, Fantasy, Comedy	184
9	The Elementary School (1991)	Jan Svěrák	Comedy	159
10	Journey to the Beginning of Time (1955)	Karel Zeman	Adventure, Science Fiction	131

Kánon 100 Poll 2018

Num	Film	Director	Genre
1	The Cremator (1969)	Juraj Herz	Horror
2	The Firemen's Ball (1967)	Miloš Forman	Comedy
3	Marketa Lazarová (1967)	František Vláčil	Historical

== By genre ==
=== Comedy ===
1998 public survey "Comedy of the Century"

Num	Film	Director
1	I Enjoy the World with You (1982)	Marie Poledňáková
2	Kolya (1996)	Jan Svěrák
3	Tři oříšky pro Popelku (1973)	Václav Vorlíček

Public Survey by Novinky.cz 2007

Num	Film	Director	Points
1	My Sweet Little Village (1985)	Jiří Menzel	22.4%
2	The Inheritance or Fuckoffguysgoodday (1992)	Věra Chytilová	17.3%
3	Cosy Dens (1999)	Jan Hřebejk	11.5%

=== Experimental ===
Kinobox rating 2017

Num	Film	Director	%
1	Happy End (1967)	Oldřich Lipský	80%
2	Pražská 5 (1988)	Tomáš Vorel	76%
3	Wild Flowers (2000)	F. A. Brabec	76%
4	Daisies (1966)	Věra Chytilová	73%
5	The White Dove (1960)	František Vláčil	72%
6	Miraculous Virgin (1967)	Štefan Uher	71%
7	A Report on the Party and the Guests (1966)	Jan Němec	71%
8	Fruit of Paradise (1970)	Věra Chytilová	68%
9	Kinoautomat (1967)	Radúz Činčera, Ján Roháč, Vladimír Svitáček	65%
10	The Magpie in the Wisp (1983)	Juraj Herz	63%

=== Fairy tale films ===
Dáma rating 2012

Num	Film	Director
1	Give the Devil His Due (1985)	Hynek Bočan
2	Once Upon a Time, There Was a King... (1954)	Bořivoj Zeman
3	The Emperor and the Golem (1951)	Martin Frič
4	The Proud Princess (1952)	Bořivoj Zeman
5	Krabat – The Sorcerer's Apprentice (1977)	Karel Zeman
6	Three Wishes for Cinderella (1973)	Václav Vorlíček
7	The Tale of John and Mary (1980)	Karel Zeman
8	Three Veterans (1983)	Oldřich Lipský
9	Šíleně smutná princezna (1968)	Bořivoj Zeman

Kinobox rating 2017

Num	Film	Director	%
1	Give the Devil His Due (1985)	Hynek Bočan	87%
2	Three Wishes for Cinderella (1973)	Václav Vorlíček	86%
3	Once Upon a Time, There Was a King... (1954)	Bořivoj Zeman	84%
4	Šíleně smutná princezna (1968)	Bořivoj Zeman	83%
5	Long Live Ghosts! (1977)	Oldřich Lipský	83%
6	Three Veterans (1983)	Oldřich Lipský	83%
7	The Proud Princess (1952)	Bořivoj Zeman	82%
8	Dívka na koštěti (1972)	Václav Vorlíček	82%
9	Panna a netvor (1978)	Juraj Herz	80%
10	Dařbuján a Pandrhola (1960)	Martin Frič	80%

=== Horror ===
Kinobox rating 2017

Num	Film	Director	%
1	The Cremator (1968)	Juraj Herz	85%
2	Panna a netvor (1978)	Juraj Herz	81%
3	Krabat – The Sorcerer's Apprentice (1977)	Karel Zeman	80%
4	Hrabě Drakula (1970)	Anna Procházková	78%
5	Wolf's Hole (1987)	Věra Chytilová	75%
6	Deváté srdce (1979)	Juraj Herz	75%
7	Valerie and Her Week of Wonders (1970)	Jaromil Jireš	75%
8	Lunacy (2005)	Jan Švankmajer	75%
9	~~Freckled Max and the Spooks (1987)~~	Juraj Jakubisko	74%~~/~~
10	Little Otik (2000)	Jan Švankmajer	74%

=== Musical ===
Public Survey by Novinky.cz 2007

Num	Film	Director	Points
1	A Night at Karlstein (1974)	Zdeněk Podskalský	34%
2	Long Live Ghosts! (1977)	Oldřich Lipský	18%
3	Hop Pickers (1964)	Ladislav Rychman	8%
4	Rebels (2001)	Filip Renč	5%
5	Lemonade Joe (1964)	Oldřich Lipský	5%
6	Big Beat (1993)	Jan Hřebejk	3%
7	A Ballad for a Bandit (1978)	Vladimír Sís	3%
8	Year of the Devil (2002)	Petr Zelenka	3%
9	The Incredibly Sad Princess	Bořivoj Zeman	3%

=== Science fiction ===
Public Survey by Novinky.cz 2007

Num	Film	Director	Points
1	Journey to the Beginning of Time (1955)	Karel Zeman	37%

Kinobox Public Survey 2010

Num	Film	Director	Points
1	Journey to the Beginning of Time (1955)	Karel Zeman	15.56%
2	Ikarie XB-1 (1963)	Jindřich Polák	5.46%
3	The Fabulous World of Jules Verne (1954)	Karel Zeman	5.30%
4	The Fabulous Baron Munchausen (1961)	Karel Zeman	4.91%
5	Tomorrow I'll Wake Up and Scald Myself with Tea (1977)	Jindřich Polák	4.12%
6	Accumulator 1 (1993)	Jan Svěrák	4.02%
7	Což takhle dát si špenát (1977)	Václav Vorlíček	3.90%
8	If a Thousand Clarinets (1965)	Ján Roháč and Vladimír Svitáček	3.45%
9	Krakatit (1948)	Otakar Vávra	3.40%
10	I Killed Einstein, Gentlemen (1969)	Oldřich Lipský	3.01%

Kinobox rating 2017

Num	Film	Director	%
1	Journey to the Beginning of Time (1955)	Karel Zeman	84%
2	You Are a Widow, Sir (1971)	Václav Vorlíček	84%
3	Což takhle dát si špenát (1977)	Václav Vorlíček	83%
4	The Fabulous World of Jules Verne (1954)	Karel Zeman	83%
5	Tomorrow I'll Wake Up and Scald Myself with Tea (1977)	Jindřich Polák	82%
6	I Killed Einstein, Gentlemen (1969)	Oldřich Lipský	82%
7	The Fabulous Baron Munchausen (1961)	Karel Zeman	82%
8	Krakatit (1948)	Otakar Vávra	80%
9	Ikarie XB-1 (1963)	Jindřich Polák	75%
10	Wolf's Hole (1987)	Věra Chytilová	75%

=== Silent ===
2010 public survey by Týden.cz

Num	Film	Director	Genre
1	Erotikon (1929)	Gustav Machatý	Romantic
2	The Good Soldier Schweik (1926)	Karel Lamač	War, Comedy
3	Gypsies (1922)	Karl Anton	Drama
4	The May Fairy (1926)	Karl Anton	Romantic
5	Redivivus (1921)	Jan Stanislav Kolár	Fantasy, Horror

== By period ==
=== 1918-1939 ===
2010 public survey by Týden.cz

Num	Film	Director	Genre
1	Christian (1939)	Martin Frič	Comedy
2	Cesta do hlubin študákovy duše (1939)	Martin Frič	Comedy
3	Eva Fools Around (1939)	Martin Frič	Comedy
4	U pokladny stál (1939)	Karel Lamač	Comedy
5	Skeleton on Horseback (1937)	Hugo Haas	Science Fiction, Drama
6	Imperial and Royal Field Marshal (1930)	Karel Lamač	Comedy
7	Workers, Let's Go (1934)	Martin Frič	Adventure
8	Muži v offsidu (1931)	Svatopluk Innemann	Comedy
9	The Merry Wives (1938)	Otakar Vávra	Historical, Comedy
10	Ecstasy (1932)	Gustav Machatý	Romantic, Drama

=== 1940s ===
2010 public survey by Týden.cz

Num	Film	Director	Genre
1	Babička (1940)	František Čáp	Drama
2	The Poacher's Foster Daughter or Noble Millionaire (1949)	Martin Frič	Comedy
3	Hostinec „U kamenného stolu“	Josef Gruss (actor)	Comedy
4	Krakatit (1948)	Otakar Vávra	Adventure, Science Fiction
5	Silent Barricade (1949)	Otakar Vávra	War
6	Čapek's Tales (1947)	Martin Frič	Crime, Comedy
7	Divá Bára (1949)	Vladimír Čech	Comedy
8	Řeka čaruje (1945)	Václav Krška	Comedy
9	Warriors of Faith	Vladimír Borský	Historical
10	Distant Journey (1949)	Alfréd Radok	War, drama

=== 1950s ===
2010 public survey by Týden.cz

Num	Film	Director	Genre	Points
1	Journey to the Beginning of Time (1955)	Karel Zeman	Adventure, Science Fiction	23%
2	The Proud Princess (1952)	Bořivoj Zeman	Comedy	18%
3	The Emperor and the Golem (1951)	Martin Frič	Historical, Fantasy, Comedy	13%
4	The Fabulous World of Jules Verne (1958)	Karel Zeman	Adventure, Science Fiction	12%
5	The Good Soldier Schweik (1956)	Karel Steklý	War, Comedy	6%
6	Vlčí jáma (1957)	Jiří Weiss	Drama	5%
7	Smugglers of Death (1959)	Karel Kachyňa	Adventure, Crime	5%
8	The Good Soldier Schweik (1955)	Jiří Trnka	Animated, War, Comedy	3%
9	I Dutifully Report (1957)	Karel Steklý	War, Comedy	2.5%
10	Silvery Wind (1954)	Václav Krška	Drama	2%

=== 1960s ===
2010 public survey by Týden.cz
1960-1965

Num	Film	Director	Genre	Points
1	Lemonade Joe (1964)	Oldřich Lipský	Western, Comedy	30%
2	Hop Pickers (1964)	Ladislav Rychman	Romantic Musical	16%
3	Higher Principle (1960)	Jiří Krejčík	War, Drama	13%
4	Black Peter (1963)	Miloš Forman	Comedy, Drama	10%
5	The Cassandra Cat (1963)	Vojtěch Jasný	Fantasy	4%
6	The Fabulous Baron Munchausen (1961)	Karel Zeman	Adventure, Science Fiction	3.8%
7	If a Thousand Clarinets (1965)	Ján Roháč and Vladimír Svitáček	Musical, Fantasy, Comedy	3.8%
8	Atentát (1964)	Jiří Sequens	War	3%
9	Death Is Called Engelchen (1963)	Ján Kadár, Elmar Klos	War	2.3%
10	Diamonds of the Night (1964)	Jan Němec	War, drama	2.3%

1965-1967

Num	Film	Director	Genre	Points
1	Marketa Lazarová (1967)	František Vláčil	Historical	28%
2	Firemen's Ball (1967)	Miloš Forman	Comedy, Drama	15%
3	Capricious Summer (1968)	Jiří Menzel	Comedy	10.4%
4	Closely Watched Trains (1966)	Jiří Menzel	War, drama	8%
5	The Shop on Main Street (1965)	Ján Kadár and Elmar Klos	War drama	6.7%
6	Svatba jako řemen (1967)	Jiří Krejčík	Comedy	4.9%
7	The Valley of the Bees (1967)	František Vláčil	Historical	4.3%
8	Loves of a Blonde (1965)	Miloš Forman	Comedy, Romance, Drama	3.6%
9	The Stolen Airship (1966)	Karel Zeman	Adventure, Fantasy	3.3%
10	The White Lady (1965)	Zdeněk Podskalský	Comedy	2.7%

1968-1969

Num	Film	Director	Genre	Points
1	The Cremator (1968)	Juraj Herz	Horror	31%
2	All My Compatriots (1968)	Vojtěch Jasný	Drama	14.6%
3	Men about Town (1969)	Zdeněk Podskalský	Comedy	13.9%
4	Behold Homolka (1970)	Jaroslav Papoušek	Comedy	10%
5	Larks on a String (1969)	Jiří Menzel	Drama	7.5%
6	Witchhammer (1969)	Otakar Vávra	Historical	6.4%
7	Sky Riders (1968)	Jindřich Polák	War	4.6%
8	Adelheid (1969)	František Vláčil	Drama	2.8%
9	Case for a Rookie Hangman (1969)	Pavel Juráček	Mystery	2.5%
10	The Joke (1968)	Jaromil Jireš	Drama	1%

=== 1970s ===
2010 public survey by Týden.cz

Num	Film	Director	Genre	Points
1	Marecek, Pass Me the Pen! (1976)	Oldřich Lipský	Comedy	18.9%
2	Ball Lightning (1978)	Ladislav Smoljak, Zdeněk Podskalský	Comedy	16.7%
3	The Ear (1970)	Karel Kachyňa	Thriller	12.8%
4	Three Wishes for Cinderella (1973)	Václav Vorlíček	Fairy-Tale film	9.4%
5	Oil Lamps (1971)	Juraj Herz	Drama	7.2%
6	Dinner for Adele (1977)	Oldřich Lipský	Fantasy, Comedy	6.7%
7	Love Between the Raindrops (1979)	Karel Kachyňa	Romantic, Comedy	5%
8	Prefab Story (1979)	Věra Chytilová	Comedy	3.3%
8	The Divine Emma (1979)	Jiří Krejčík	Historical, Drama	2.2%
10	Krabat – The Sorcerer's Apprentice (1978)	Karel Zeman	Animated, Horror	2.1%

=== 1980s ===
2010 public survey by Týden.cz

Num	Film	Director	Genre	Points
1	My Sweet Little Village (1985)	Jiří Menzel	Comedy	20.5%
2	Waiter, Scarper! (1981)	Ladislav Smoljak	Crime, Comedy	16.1%
3	Kouř (1991)	Tomáš Vorel	Musical, Comedy	10.5%
4	The Elementary School (1991)	Jan Svěrák	Comedy	10.2%
5	Cutting It Short (1980)	Jiří Menzel	Comedy	9.6%
6	Sněženky a machři (1983)	Karel Smyczek	Comedy	8.7%
7	I Enjoy the World with You (1982)	Marie Poledňáková	Family, Comedy	5.6%
8	Krakonoš a lyžníci (1981)	Vera Plívová-Simková	Family, Comedy	2.8%
9	Three Veterans (1983)	Oldřich Lipský	Fantasy, Comedy	2.1%
10	Bony a klid (1988)	Vít Olmer	Crime, Drama	1.8%

=== Since 1990 ===
2011 survey by Hospodářské noviny

Num	Film	Director	Genre	Votes
1	Cosy Dens (1999)	Jan Hřebejk	Comedy	31%
2	The Karamazovs (2008)	Petr Zelenka	Drama	20%
3	Loners (2000)	David Ondříček	Comedy	10%
4	Sekal Has to Die (1998)	Vladimír Michálek	War, Drama	9%
5	The Elementary School (1991)	Jan Svěrák	Comedy	7%
6	Walking Too Fast (2010)	Radim Špaček	Thriller	6%
6	The Inheritance or Fuckoffguysgoodday (1992)	Věra Chytilová	Comedy	6%
7	Empties (2002)	Zdeněk Svěrák	Comedy	3%
7	Divided We Fall (2002)	Jan Hřebejk	War, Drama	3%
8	Buttoners (1997)	Petr Zelenka	Comedy	2%
8	Černí baroni (1992)	Zdeněk Sirový	Comedy	2%
8	Dark Blue World (2001)	Jan Svěrák	War	2%

2007-2017 period by Kinobox rating 2017 (critics)

Num	Film	Director	Genre	Rating
1	Walking Too Fast (2010)	Radim Špaček	Thriller	87%
2	The Karamazovs (2008)	Petr Zelenka	Drama	85%
3	Lost in Munich (2015)	Petr Zelenka	Drama	83%
4	Protector (2009)	Marek Najbrt	War, Drama	82%
5	The Seven Ravens (2015)	Alice Nellis	Fantasy	80%
6	Long Live the Family! (2011)	Robert Sedláček	Crime, Drama	79%
7	Kooky (2010)	Jan Svěrák	Action, Comedy	78%
8	The Way Out (2014)	Petr Vaclav	Drama	78%
9	3 Seasons in Hell (2009)	Tomáš Mašín	Romantic Drama	77%
10	To See the Sea (2014)	Jiří Mádl	Drama	77%

2008-2018 period by Kinobox rating 2018 (audience)

Num	Film	Director	Genre	Rating
1	Dukla 61 (2018)	David Ondříček	Disaster	84%
2	Anthropoid (2016)	Sean Ellis	War	77%
3	Lidice (2011)	Petr Nikolaev	War, Drama	77%
4	Anděl Páně 2 (2016)	Jiří Strach	Fantasy	77%
5	The Seven Ravens (2015)	Alice Nellis	Fantasy	76%
6	Theory of Tiger (2016)	Radek Bajgar	Comedy	76%
7	Trabantem napříč Afrikou (2010)	Dan Přibáň, Dana Zlatohlávková	Documentary	75%
8	Identity Card (2010)	Ondřej Trojan	Comedy	75%
9	In the Shadow (2012)	David Ondříček	Thriller	74%
10	Under the Sun (2015)	Vitaly Mansky	Documentary	74%

2020 survey by Association of Czech Film Critics

Num	Film	Director	Genre
1	Kolya (1996)	Jan Svěrák	Drama
2	Kouř (1991)	Tomáš Vorel	Comedy
3	The Inheritance or Fuckoffguysgoodday (1992)	Věra Chytilová	Comedy
4	The Idiot Returns (1999)	Saša Gedeon	Comedy
5	The Elementary School (1991)	Jan Svěrák	Comedy
6	Walking Too Fast (2010)	Radim Špaček	Thriller
7	Cosy Dens (1999)	Jan Hřebejk	Comedy
8	Faust (1993)	Jan Švankmajer.	Drama
9	Protector (2009)	Marek Najbrt	War, Drama
10	Sekal Has to Die (1998)	Vladimír Michálek	War, Drama

== See also ==
- Czech Lion Awards
- List of Czech submissions for the Academy Award for Best Foreign Language Film
- List of Czechoslovak submissions for the Academy Award for Best Foreign Language Film
- List of films considered the best
