= Chramosta =

Chramosta (feminine: Chramostová) is a Czech surname. Notable people with the surname include:

- Jan Chramosta (born 1990), Czech footballer
- Vlasta Chramostová (1926–2019), Czech actress
