= Zora Rozsypalová =

Czech stage and film actress

- Born: 3 September 1922; Kroměříž, Czechoslovakia
- Died: 23 January 2010 (aged 87); Ďáblice, Prague, Czech Republic
- Occupation: Actress
- Years active: 1945–2006

Zora Rozsypalová (3 September 1922 – 23 January 2010) was a Czech stage and film actress. At the 1994 Thalia Awards she was honoured in the lifetime achievement in theatre category. She acted 230 roles at theatres in the cities of Jihlava, Olomouc and Ostrava, where she moved in 1961, and stayed until 1991. Her first film role was in the 1950 film The Great Opportunity (Czech: Veliká příležitost), although it was more than a decade until she appeared in another film. Rozsypalová's last, minor, film role was in the 2006 Věra Chytilová film, Pleasant Moments.

== Selected filmography ==
- The Great Opportunity (1950)
- Metráček (1972)
- Pleasant Moments (2006)
