= Jana Nováková (actress) =

Czech film actress and model

- Born: 25 September 1948; Prague, Czechoslovakia
- Died: 3 December 1968 (aged 20); Munich, West Germany
- Occupation(s): Actress, model
- Years active: 1965–1968

Jana Nováková (25 September 1948 – 3 December 1968) was a Czech film actress and model. Nováková film career mostly took place in German industry. She was shot by her husband in their luxury villa in Munich, West Germany.

== Filmography ==
- Loves of a Blonde
- Riders of the Sky
- The Phantom of Morrisville
