= The Phantom of Morrisville =

- DVD cover
- Directed by: Bořivoj Zeman
- Written by: Bořivoj Zeman; František Vlček
- Starring: Oldřich Nový
- Cinematography: Jirí Tarantík
- Edited by: Josef Dobrichovský
- Release date: 15 July 1966
- Running time: 89 minutes
- Country: Czechoslovakia
- Language: Czech

The Phantom of Morrisville (Czech: Fantom Morrisvillu) is a Czech comedy film directed by Bořivoj Zeman. It was released in 1966.

== Plot ==
The movie is a parody on Western mystical thrillers and horror films, in particular—1961 film The Pit and the Pendulum. A musician from the symphony orchestra reads an English thriller novel during the concert, while performing his parts of the Georges Bizet's opera Carmen. The book makes so strong an impression on him that he imagines himself to be the novel's protagonist, Sir Hannibal Morris, an owner of a huge Gothic castle. Then come mysterious murders and disappearances, intrigues, kidnappings, and love.

== Cast ==
- Oldřich Nový as Drummer Emil / Sir Hannibal Morris
- Květa Fialová as Lady Clarence Hamilton – Hanibal's fiancée
- Jana Nováková as Mabel – Hanibal's secretary
- Vít Olmer as Allan Pinkerton
- Waldemar Matuška as Manuel Díaz – adventurer
- Jaroslav Marvan as Inspector Brumpby from Scotland Yard
- František Filipovský as Doctor Stolly
- Jan Skopeček as Servant John
- Jaroslav Rozsíval as Dixi
- Jaroslav Heyduk as Drummond – called 'Ruzenka'
- Otto Šimánek as Miky – called 'Kuratko' ('Chicken')
- Vlasta Fabianová as Arabella – the Gray Lady
- Lubomír Kostelka as Ind Abu – guardian tigers
- Rudolf Deyl as Coroner
- Nataša Gollová as Lady White – shelter owner for incorrigible criminal
- Hamm as The Lead Jannie
