= List of Czech films =

The list of Czech films is a list of films made in the Czech lands from 1898 to the present. After 1930 some were with Czech sound, and after 1947 some were in colour. The list is ordered by year of release.

- List of Czech films before 1920
- List of Czech films of the 1920s
- List of Czech films of the 1930s
- List of Czech films of the 1940s
- List of Czech films of the 1950s
- List of Czech films of the 1960s
- List of Czech films of the 1970s
- List of Czech films of the 1980s
- List of Czech films of the 1990s
- List of Czech films of the 2000s
- List of Czech films of the 2010s
- List of Czech films of the 2020s

== See also ==
- List of Slovak films
