= Steam Above a Pot =

- Directed by: Miroslav Cikán
- Starring: Vladimír Ráž, Eva Marie Kavanova, and Robert Vrchota.
- Edited by: Antonín Zelenka
- Production company: Ceskoslovenský Státní Film
- Release date: 1950
- Running time: 84 minutes
- Country: Czechoslovakia

Steam Above a Pot (Czech: Pára nad hrncem) is a 1950 Czechoslovak comedy film, directed by Miroslav Cikán. It stars Vladimír Ráž, Eva Marie Kavanova, and Robert Vrchota.
