= Anděl na horách =

- Directed by: Bořivoj Zeman
- Written by: Josef Neuberg; František Vlček
- Cinematography: Jan Roth
- Edited by: Josef Dobřichovský
- Music by: Dalibor C. Vačkář
- Production company: Studio uměleckého filmu
- Distributed by: Rozdělovna filmů Československého státního filmu
- Release date: 25 November 1955
- Running time: 91 minutes
- Country: Czechoslovakia
- Language: Czech

Anděl na horách is a 1955 Czechoslovak comedy film directed by Bořivoj Zeman. This is the sequel to the 1952 film, Dovolená s Andělem.

== Plot summary ==
The forever-grumpy transportation inspector Gustav Anděl finds himself in the midst of a comedic family drama as his adult son, Mirek, prepares to marry. Being a dutiful father, Gustav makes it his mission to vet his future daughter-in-law, Věra, during a winter trip to the Tatra Mountains. Comedy ensues when he confuses his future daughter-in-law with her friend who shares the same name, who is on vacation with her boyfriend. This leads Gustav to believe that his son’s fiancée is surrounded by other suitors and results in many awkward and embarrassing situations for everyone involved.

== Cast ==
- Jaroslav Marvan as Gustav Anděl
- Milada Želenská as Eliška Andělová
- Jaroslav Mareš as Mirek Anděl
- Milena Dvorská as Věra Matoušková, Mirek's girlfriend
- Vlasta Fabianová as Věra's mother
- Josef Kemr as Bohouš Vyhlídka
- Helena Loubalová as Věra Novotná
- Karol Machata as Zdeněk Soukup
- Stella Zázvorková as Mánička Vyhlídková
- Emil Bolek as Director of Spofana
- Rudolf Deyl jr as Puleček
- František Filipovský as Mejzlík
- Theodor Pištěk as Director of Dopravní podnik hl.m. Prahy
