= A Christmas Dream =

- Directed by: Karel Zeman; Bořivoj Zeman
- Written by: Karel Zeman
- Cinematography: Pavel Hrdlička
- Edited by: Zdenek Stehlík
- Music by: Jiří Šust
- Release dates: 1945 (Czechoslovakia); 1948 (United States)
- Languages: Czech; English

A Christmas Dream (Czech: Vánoční sen) is a 1945 Czechoslovak short film directed by Karel Zeman and Bořivoj Zeman.

== Plot ==
Under the family Christmas tree, a young girl finds that she has been given a collection of new toys. Happily taking them in her arms, she tosses aside her old rag doll. That night, the girl dreams that the rag doll, abandoned on the floor, comes silently to life to entertain her. The rag doll dances across a piano and skates across a table. The new toys, also coming to life, join the antics. The rag doll, turning on an electric fan, is blown about and nearly knocks over a vase as it attempts to avoid falling off the table. The girl, getting out of bed, saves the vase and takes the doll in her arms. The girl wakes up to find her rag doll still on the floor.

== Production ==
The film was Karel Zeman's first experiment in combining stop-motion animation with live-action footage, a process he continued to explore in his later feature films, beginning with Journey to the Beginning of Time (1955) and The Fabulous World of Jules Verne (1958). The pioneering animator Hermína Týrlová also reportedly participated in the production.

== Release ==
In the United States, the film was released by Universal-International in 1948. An abridgement of the American version for home projection was sold by Castle Films from 1949 through 1965. The American version replaces the wordless Czech soundtrack with new audio, including a voice for the rag doll; it also includes new footage in which Santa Claus, appearing by magic, sends the Christmas dream to the girl.

== Reception and legacy ==
In their history of Eastern European films, Mira Liehm and Antonín J. Liehm called A Christmas Dream "a classic of its genre." Scott MacGillivray, in a review of the Castle Films version, wrote that "the Zemans' stop-motion effects are truly extraordinary." Le Parisien called the film "magical" and rated it four stars out of a possible four.

The film was screened at the 1946 Cannes Film Festival, where it won the Grand Prix International for best short fiction film.

The dubbed version was spoofed by RiffTrax on December 21, 2009.

It is also available on HBO Max.

== See also ==
- List of Christmas films
- Arthouse animation
