= Miloš Havel =

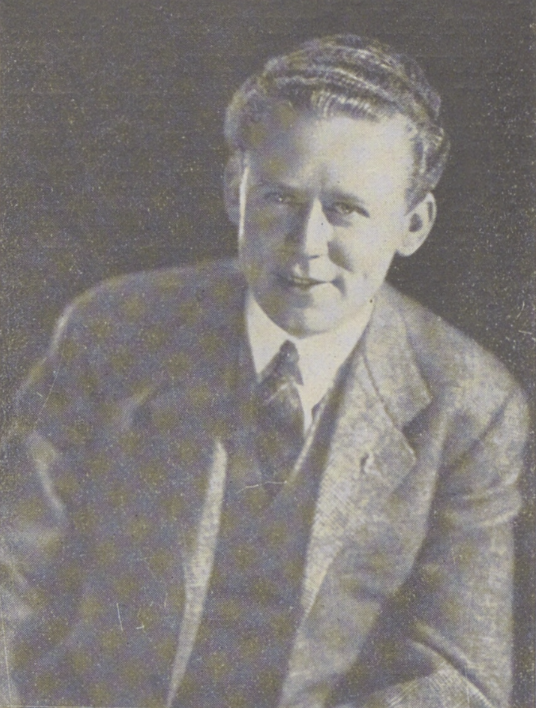
- Havel in 1929
- Born: 3 November 1899; Prague, Austria-Hungary
- Died: 25 February 1968 (aged 68); Munich, West Germany
- Occupations: Film producer; Studio executive
- Organizations: Barrandov Studios

Miloš Havel (3 November 1899 – 25 February 1968) was a Czech film producer and studio executive. Havel was a director of the film production company Lucernafilm, which was founded by his father in 1912. He was also a chairman of the film studio A-B, which built its new studios in Barrandov in 1932. He remained in charge of the studio during German occupation of Czechoslovakia. After World War II his wartime activities were criticized heavily, and he was put on trial for charges relating to collaboration with Nazi Germany. Though acquitted, he was banned from working in the film industry. He left the country and settled in Munich. He was the uncle of Czech president Václav Havel.

== Career ==
Havel ran the movie theater Lucerna Palace in Prague and later established the Barrandov Studios. During the German occupation of Czechoslovakia, Havel was forced to sell his share in Barrandov Studios but he remained in charge, and protected its staff from forced labour in Germany. At that time, Barrandov Studios produced newsreels and propaganda films for the government of the Protectorate of Bohemia and Moravia as well as Czech productions. Havel was later credited with using his influence in the Protectorate to enable Lída Baarová, the former mistress of Joseph Goebbels, to perform in what have become some of her best films.

Following World War II, Havel was denounced from a variety of quarters for his wartime activities; though sometimes the accusations were politically motivated, even Havel family friend Jaromír Kopecký privately confided in Václav Havel his opinion that Havel was a Nazi collaborator.

Havel attempted to emigrate, but his exit visa was denied. In March 1949, he was arrested and put on trial on charges related to collaboration with Nazi Germany. The prosecution also alleged that he had used Lucerna Palace to fulfill his "perverted cravings" for young men. (Note: Havel was gay, a fact that was an "open secret" in Prague. Nevertheless, Havel entered a show marriage with a female friend and would generally make public appearances escorted by one of the actresses he employed for his films.) Ultimately cleared of the charges against him due to lack of evidence, he was nevertheless banned from working in the film industry as "morally unfit", and Barrandov Studios was nationalized. Havel attempted to skip the country in 1949, but was arrested by Austrian police and deported back to Czechoslovakia where he was sentenced to one year of labor. (Note: Ownership of Havel's properties were transferred back to the Havel family after the Velvet Revolution.) Released early due to poor health, he went to stay with the family of Václav Havel, receiving a mixed welcome on his arrival with Václav Havel's mother telling Havel the family had experienced "enough troubles already because of you".

Havel left the country a second time in 1952, ultimately settling in Munich where he filed suit against UFA GmbH for not paying for its wartime use of Barrandov. Havel used the proceeds from his successful lawsuit to go into business in Munich.

== Personal life and legacy ==
Havel was the uncle of Václav Havel. In 1999, Václav Havel organized a hundredth birthday party for his late uncle. A film on the life of Miloš Havel, with a screenplay by Jan Novák, has been in development since 2016.

In a review of Havel's biography, Anna Batistová wrote that

"His short membership in the National Fascist League, his connections to Freemasons, Czech and German intelligence, and the disclosure of one of his friends as a double agent just add to the ambiguity, which, on the one hand, does not allow us to paint his character simply black or white. On the other hand, as the author of his biography argues, this ambiguity probably allowed him to help the domestic film industry, and to ultimately save it from German hands."
