= Helena Vondráčková =

Czech singer (born 1947)

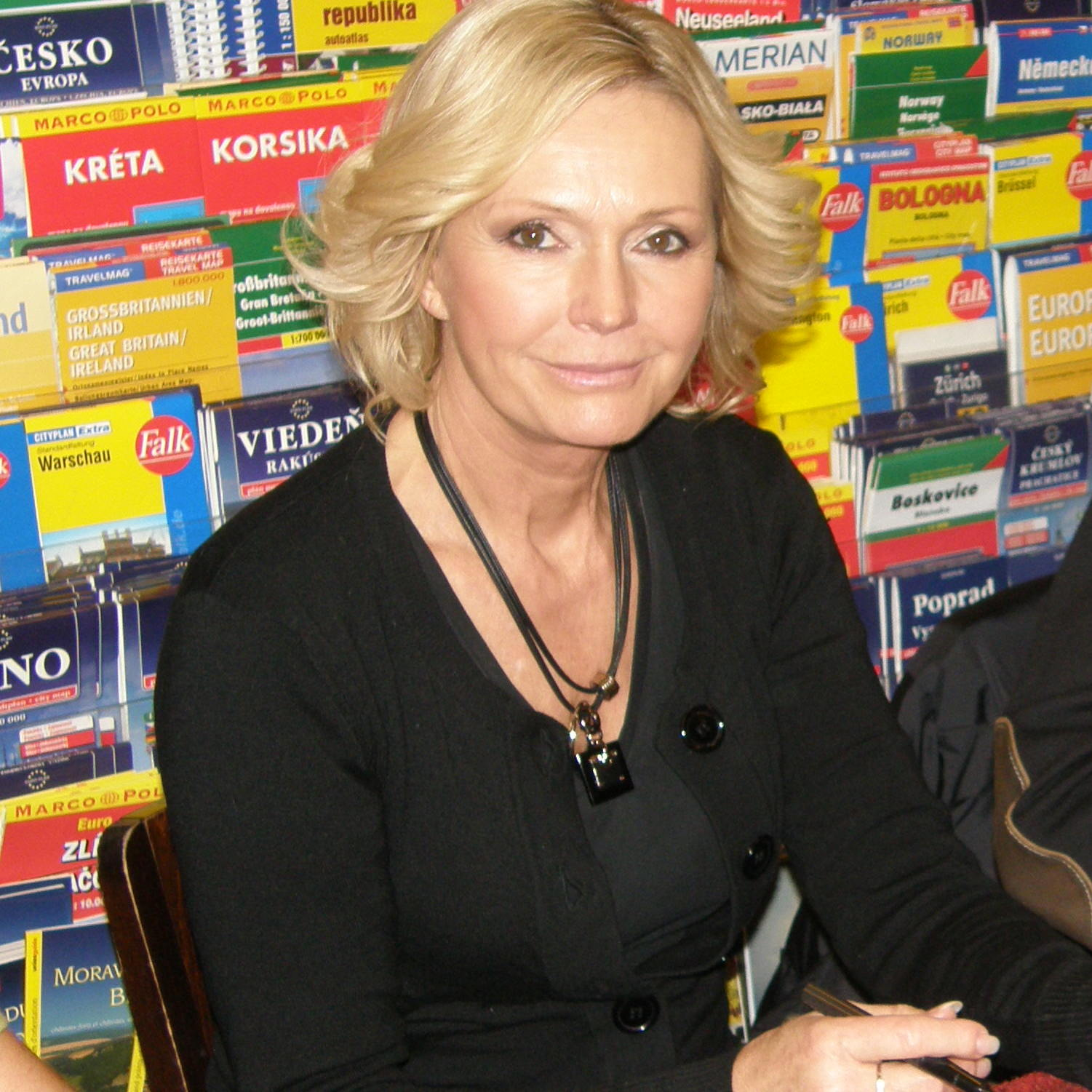

Background information
- Born: 24 June 1947 (age 79); Prague, Czechoslovakia
- Genres: Pop
- Occupation: Singer
- Years active: 1964–present
- Labels: Universal; EMI; Warner; Supraphon
- Website: vondrackova.cz

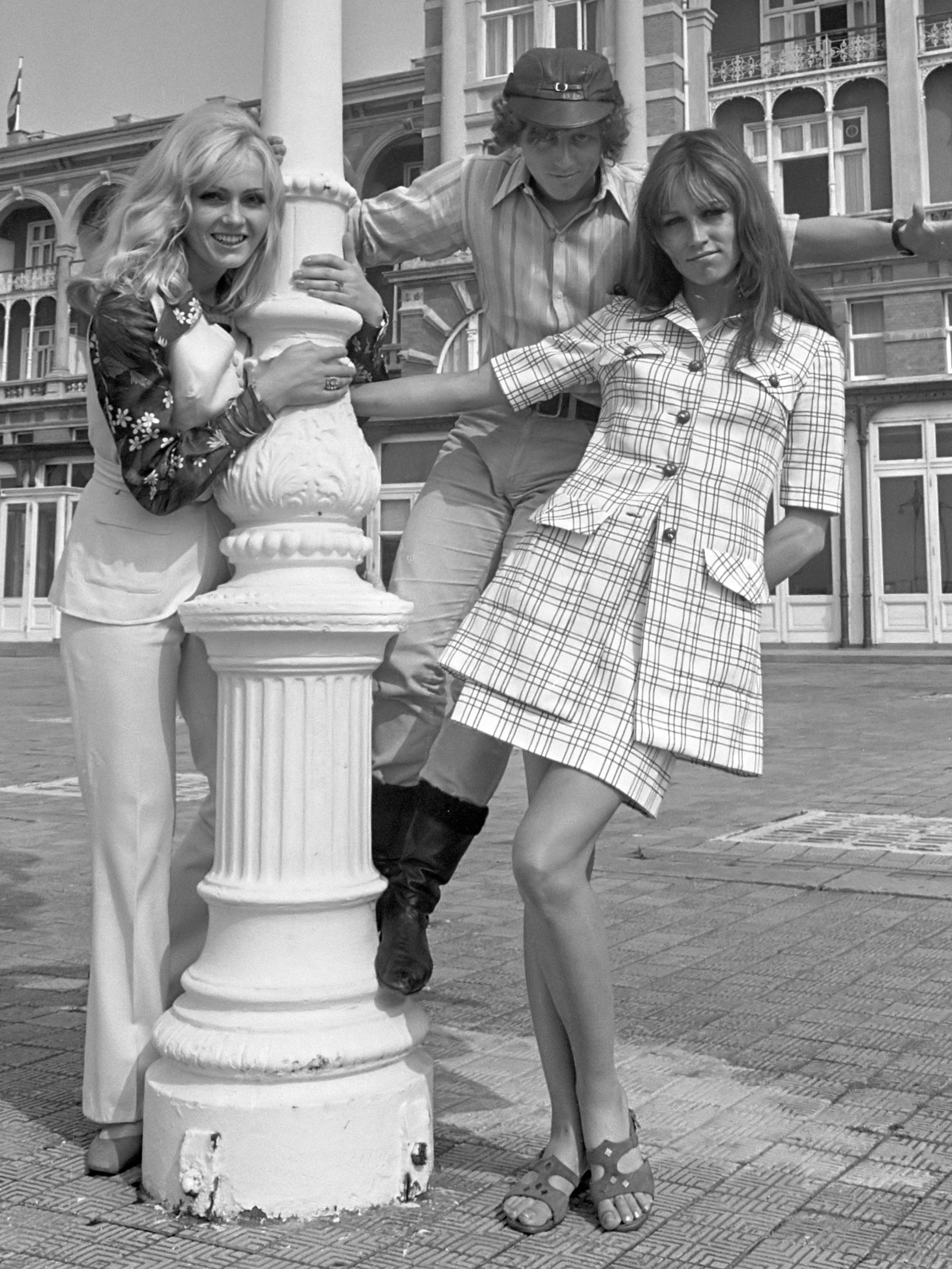
Marta Kubišová, Václav Neckář, Helena Vondráčková (from right to left), as Golden Kids in 1969, shortly before Marta Kubišová was banned

Helena Vondráčková (born 24 June 1947, in Prague) is a Czech singer and actress whose prolific career as a performer has spanned more than six decades, earning her acclaim both domestically and internationally. Recognized for her powerful voice, enduring popularity, and artistic versatility, she first rose to fame after winning a national singing competition in 1964, with her debut recording "Červená řeka" ("Red River Valley") launching her into the public eye.

Her success continued with numerous chart-topping hits such as "Pátá", a Czech adaptation of "Downtown" by Petula Clark, and "Sladké mámení", which became an enduring classic from the beloved Czech comedy S tebou mě baví svět. She also found success with songs like "Lásko má, já stůňu" (from the musical Noc na Karlštejně) and "Dlouhá noc", which became one of her signature comeback hits in the early 2000s.

Throughout the 1960s and 70s, she appeared at major festivals, winning the Golden Lyre (Bratislavská Lyra) and the Intervision Song Contest. As a member of the legendary pop trio Golden Kids, alongside Marta Kubišová and Václav Neckář, she became a staple of Czech pop culture until the group was forced to disband in 1970 due to political suppression.

Beyond pop music, Vondráčková has also enjoyed a vibrant career in musical theater, portraying iconic roles such as Fantine in Les Misérables and Donna in Mamma Mia!. Despite facing a temporary decline in popularity after the Velvet Revolution due to her perceived association with the pre-1989 regime, her career rebounded in the 2000s with Platinum-selling albums, sold-out tours, and frequent television appearances—cementing her status as one of the Czech Republic’s most enduring and best-selling musical artists.

== Early life/career ==
=== Beginnings ===
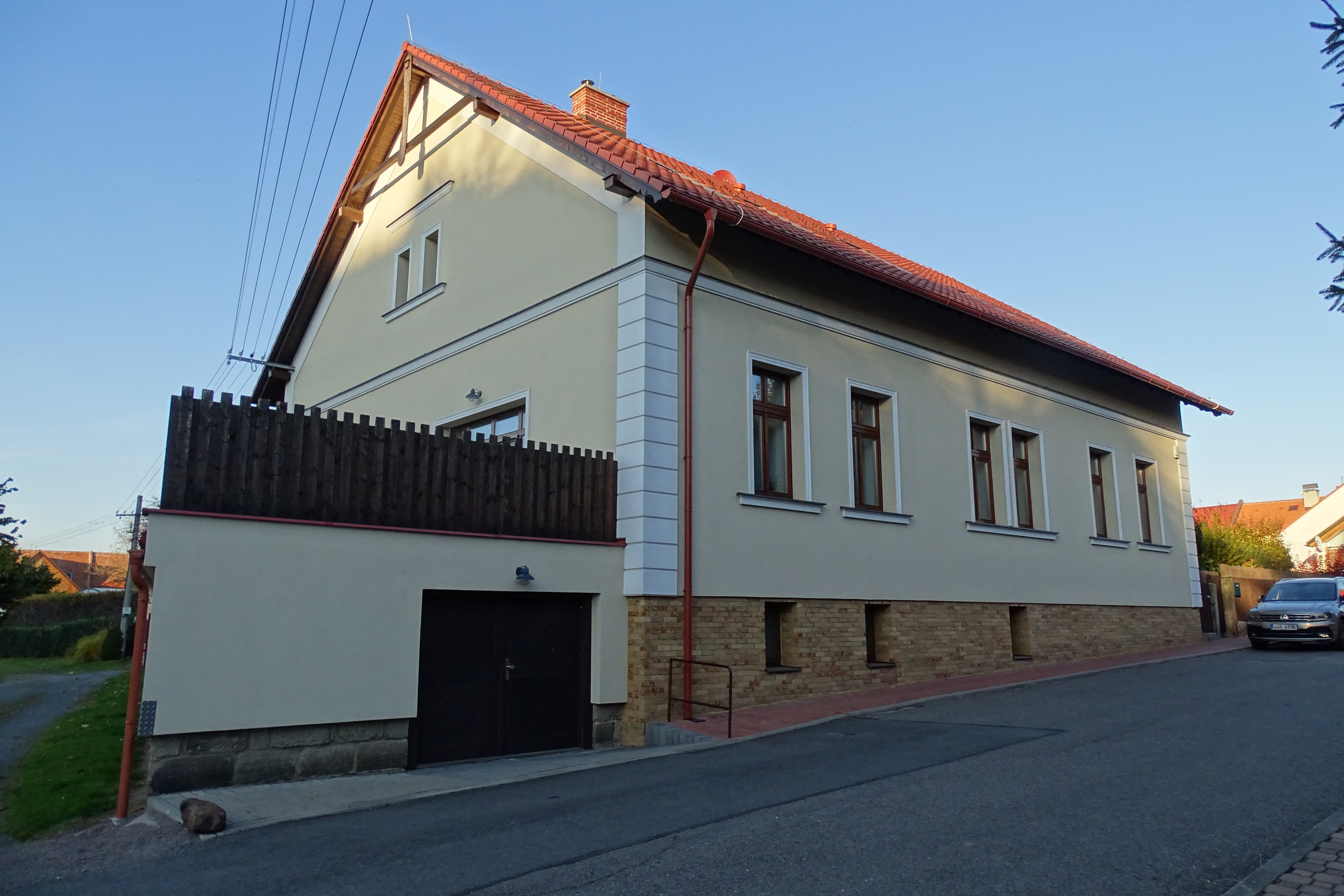
Birthplace of Helena Vondráčková in Slatiňany

Vondráčková spent her childhood years in the town of Slatiňany. She took piano lessons from an early age. In 1964 Vondráčková came to prominence when she won a national talent contest that 27 April then that 3 September she made her first recording: a Czech rendering of "Red River Valley" entitled "Červená řeka" ("Red River Valley"). In 1965, the year she graduated high school, Vondráčková was voted the most popular singer in Czechoslovakia by the readers of the magazine Mladý svět earning the Golden Nightingale award for the only time in her career although Vondráčková would subsequently earn second or third place a total of twenty-seven times with eleven Silver Nightingale awards and sixteen Bronze Nightingale awards. In the summer of 1966 Vondráčková began her music festival career competing in the inaugural Bratislavská Lýra festival as a duo with Marta Kubišová: their entry "Oh Baby Baby" earned the second-place Silver Lyre award. Vondráčková's music festival debut as a solo act was at the Rio de Janeiro International Music Festival in November 1967 where her entry "Vzdálený hlas" received the Golden Rooster award: in June 1968 Vondráčková returned Bratislavska Lyra in a duo with Waldemar Matuška and a resultant Bronze Lyre award for their entrant "To se nikdo nedoví" and in 1969 Vondráčková participated in the 1969 European Cup Festival in Knokke Belgium.

Having reached #2 on the Czechoslovak hit parade with the Kubišova duet "Oh Baby Baby", Vondráčková reached #1 in September 1967 with "Nedoufej" a rendering of the Sonny & Cher hit "Little Man": this was one of a number of Czech language cover versions Vondráčková cut for the Supraphon label, others being ""Pátá"" ("Downtown"), "Chytila jsem na pasece motýlka" ("I Only Want to Be with You") and "Růže kvetou dál", a rendering of the Gilbert Becaud hit "L'Important c'est la Rose" which afforded Vondráčková a second #1 in November 1967 and remaining in the Top Ten until March 1968. Vondráčková returned to the Top Ten in 1968 with "Hej, pane Zajíci!" a duet with Marta Kubišova and also with a Czech-language rendering of "Gli Occhi iei" entitled "Utíkej". Vondráčková's debut album appeared in 1969: entitled "Růže kvetou dál" it was a compilation of her singles released from 1964 on. That same year she starred in a fairy tale movie, The Incredibly Sad Princess.

=== The Golden Kids ===
Vondráčková had met up with singers Václav Neckář and Marta Kubišová through performing at the Rokoko Palace in Prague and had on occasion collaborated with one or both of them since December 1965, Vondráčková and Kubišová having reached #2 on the Czechoslovak hit parade in the summer of 1966 with their recorded duet "Oh Baby Baby". In January 1968 Vondráčková performed as a group with Neckář and Kubišová at a Czech music showcase presented at the MIDEM trade fair in Cannes with a resultant month-long gig for the trio at the Olympia Theatre in Paris. On 1 November 1968 Vondráčková, Neckář and Kubišová officially consolidated as an act known as the 'Golden Kids', the group recording two albums and making extensive live and televised appearances in Czechoslovakia and Germany before being forced to disband in February 1970 as Kubišová was banned from performing due to her outspoken opposition to the Communist regime in Czechoslovakia. On 3 November 1994 the members of the Golden Kids reunited for a concert at the Lucerna Palace in Prague which was filmed for television broadcast with a concert album also being released.

== Later career ==
=== the 1970s and festivals ===
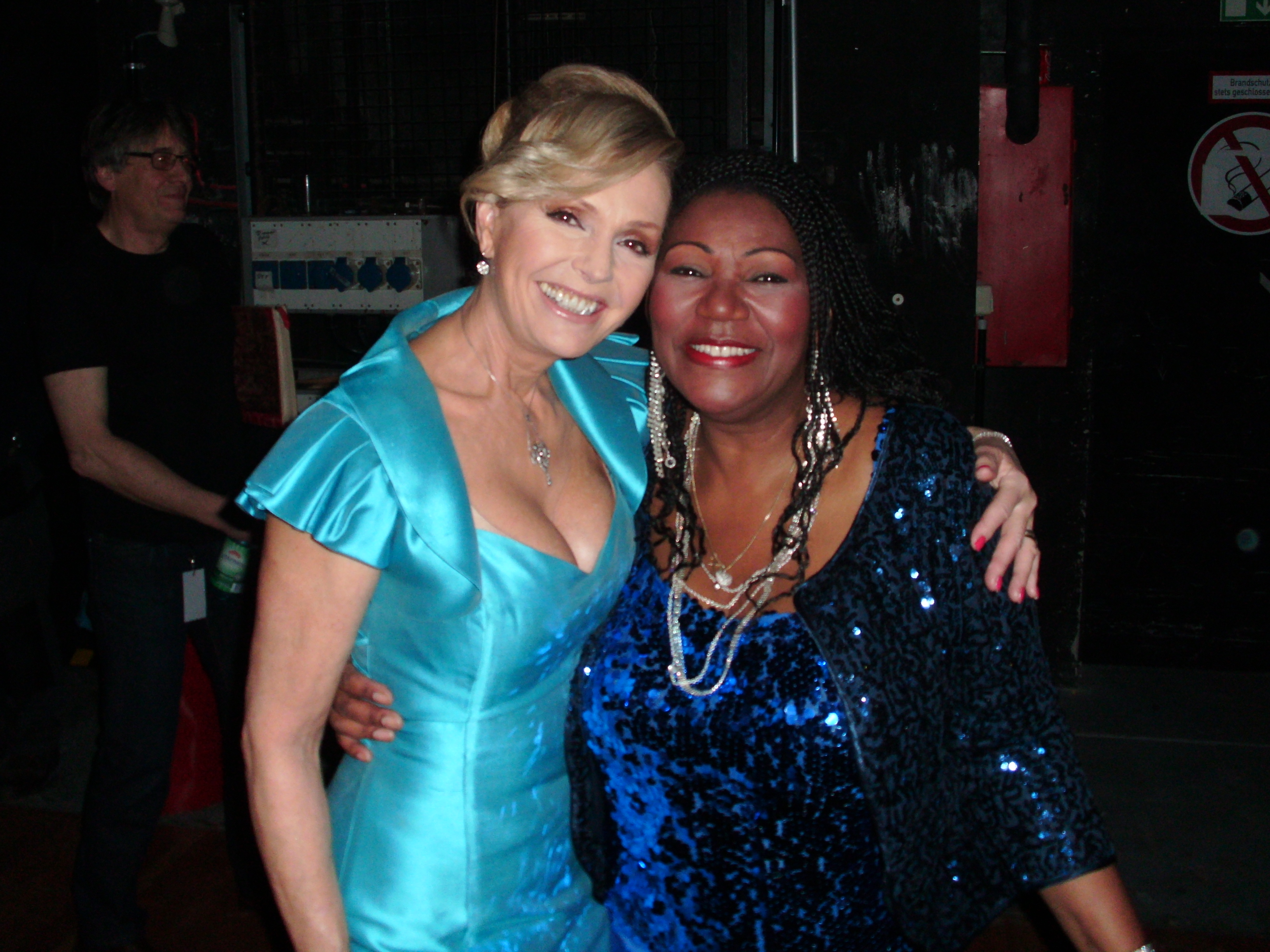
Helena Vondráčková with Liz Mitchell backstage in Chemnitz, 2012

- 1970 - In November 1970 Vondráčková participated in the inaugural World Popular Song Festival (Tokyo) with a resultant signing by the Japanese division of Columbia Records for whom she made her first recording not singing in her native Czech language with the album Isle of Helena a 1971 release sung in English: she has subsequently added French, Polish, Slovak, German, Russian, and Japanese to her repertoire. Vondráčková headlined her first concert: Helena 71 in 1971 and spent the majority of the decade touring the world, visiting countries in Europe, Asia, and North and South America.
- 1971 - (March) the Golden Stag Festival (Brasov) placing second; 1972 - the Festival Coupe d'Europe and the Knokke Festival.
- 1973 - (June) Bratislavský Lýra, the Golden Orpheus Song Festival, and (as a non-competing performer) the Intertalent Contest (Prague)
- 1974 - The zenith of Vondráčková's festival career was afforded by the song "Malovaný džbánku" which Vondráčková introduced at the 1974 Bratislavská Lýra with a resultant Golden Lyre award.
- 1975 - Bratislavská Lýra with a Silver Lyre award for "Láska zůstává dál"
- 1977 - Bratislavská Lýra; in August 1977 Vondráčková utilized "Malovaný džbánku" as her entrant at the Sopot International Song Festival - billed that year as the Intervision Song Contest - where "Malovaný džbánku" took Grand Prize and consolidated Vondráčková's stardom in Poland.
- 1978 - Although Czechoslovakia's Communist status precluded the nation being represented in the Eurovision Song Contest, Vondráčková did make an unsuccessful bid to represent Germany at Eurovision 1978, her song "Männer Wie Du" placing twelfth in a field of fifteen at the German national preliminary for Eurovision 1978.
- 1979 - In November 1979 Vondráčková returned to the Tokyo Pop Festival.
- 1982 - Her 1982 participation at Bratislavská Lýra with the entrant "Sblížení" earned her the Silver Lyre award.
- 1993 and 2000 - Vondráčková also returned - as a non-competing performer - to the Intervision Song Contest in 1978 and to the Sopot International Song Festival in 1993, 2000, 2013 and 2020.

=== 1980–present ===
Vondráčková began the eighties much like she spent the seventies, on tour – this time in Canada. As the eighties gave way to the nineties, and all of Europe was in the throes of change, she reached the milestone of selling a million albums, performed in the Czech concert Helena 90, and took on the role of Fantine in Les Misérables. In 1993, Vondrackova released two Broadway-themed musical albums, one in Czech and one in English, each entitled the Broadway Album.

In the aftermath of the Velvet Revolution of 1989, Vondráčková and other veteran Czech pop stars underwent a career decline due to being closely associated with Czechoslovakia's period of Communist rule. After several years the Czech public was able to view Vondráčková and her contemporaries objectively and with appreciation: from 1997 Vondráčková was frequently showcased on TV Nova and in 2000 she returned to the mainstream recording scene with Vodopád a fifteen track album of Czech original dance tracks which, spearheaded by the single "Dlouhá noc", reached Platinum status selling 35,000 copies.

Over the course of the first decade of the new century, Vondráčková continued to release records to commercial acclaim – she is the best selling ever singer in the Czech Republic (and Czechoslovakia before it) – as well as performing in a number of well-received concerts. Vondráčková's extensive career got the box set treatment in 2005, with the 4-CD set The Golden Collection (Universal Music) seeing release that year, as well as publication of her memoir entitled I Remember and I Don't Regret Anything. On 18 October 2005 Vondráčková headlined a gala in Prague celebrating forty years of performing: the event was filmed for broadcast by TV Nova that 26 December. In 2006, Vondráčková remained active, appearing in the Slovak version of television talent reality show Dancing With the Stars, and a year later appearing in the Polish version. A 2007 compilation 2CD Jsem jaká jsem... Best of ("I am... The Best of"), was then released, and managed a top ten placing in the Czech charts. A 2009 live DVD+CD Helena Live was managed a number 2, after Madonna's Celebration. In 2007 she was awarded the Diamond Record for half million sold records in 2007.

Vondráčková has written several books, mostly autobiographical. She has regularly appeared for over four decades in German television shows as a singer a presenter, like Ein Kessel Buntes or Ein Fest für alle. Her German lyricist and manager is since 2003 Filip Albrecht who wrote and produced several German songs for Vondráčková including Diese Nacht or Wunder gescheh´n.

=== Eurosong 2007 ===
In February 2007 Helena Vondráčková was confirmed as having accepted the invitation of Česká televize (ČT), the Czech Republic's Eurovision (ESC) sponsor, to compete in Eurosong 2007, the national preliminary round for the Czech Republic in Eurovision 2007, the Czech Republic making its ESC debut at Eurovision 2007. Vondráčková was the only name which ČT confirmed as a Eurosong 2007 entrant prior to the official 15 February 2007 announcement of Eurosong 2007 entrants: this announcement stated that Vondráčková would be competing with a track from her 23 October 2006 album release Zastav Se (...A Poslouchej) entitled "Samba". Although the Eurosong 2007 final was not broadcast by ČT until 10 March 2007 the competing songs were made available for listening from the time of their announcement with voting - done by SMS - open from 23 February 2007: around the last-named date ČT announced the disqualification of "Samba" citing the track had been recorded too far in advance to be considered as a possible entrant for Eurovision 2007. Vondráčková, given the prerogative of competing in Eurosong 2007 with a more recent song, did submit the track "Ha ha ha" but soon withdrew from Eurosong 2007 citing her disenchantment with the winner being chosen by SMS voting.

=== Stage career ===
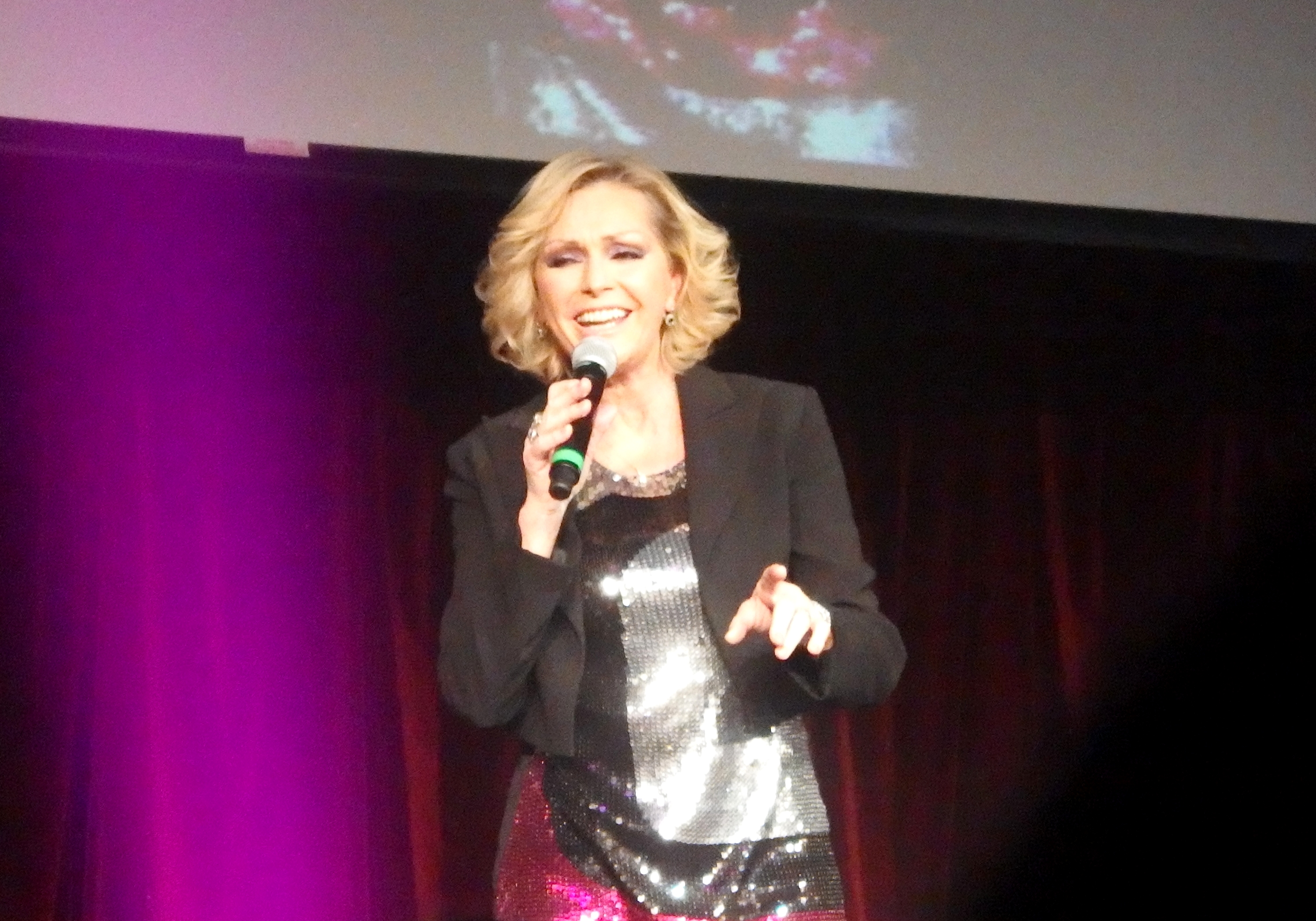
Helena Vondráčková during a concert, ca. 2012

On 25 June 1992 Vondráčková made her stage musical debut as Fantine in a production of Les Misérables mounted at the Vinohrady Theatre in Prague: she reprised the role of Fantine in a revival of Les Misérables which opened at the GoJa Music Hall 16 September 2003.

Vondráčková was attached to the inaugural Czech-language production of Miss Saigon at the GoJa Music Hall alternating in the role of Ellen but she announced her disassociation from the production following its 8 December 2004 premiere (in which Ellen had been played by Tereza Mátlová).

In May 2005 it was announced that Vondráčková had been invited by Milan Lasica to headline a production of Hello, Dolly! which opened at the Nova Scena Theatre in Bratislava on 27 January 2006. Vondráčková described the Hello, Dolly! lead as her "life role" but left the production in June 2006 claiming Nova Scena had overtaxed Vondráčková's earnings in the amount of 83,465 Kč. It was announced that November that Vondráčková and her husband/manager Michael Martin were negotiating with the new management of Nova Scena for Vondráčková to return to Hello, Dolly! but the production ran til February 2008 with Vondráčková's replacement Kateřina Brožová. (Brožová sued Michael Martin for his disparaging remarks in a radio interview in which he likened comparing the performing abilities of Vondráčková with those of Brožová to comparing a Mercedes to a Trabant. Although the Regional and High Court in Prague and the Czech Supreme Court both found in Brožová's favor awarding her an apology and 500,000 Kč, the Czech Constitutional Court ruled in March 2012 that the High Court re-address the case.)

Vondráčková returned to the musical stage in an original musical entitled Mona Lisa written by Josef Bohuslav and Michal David - the latter being the composer of Vondráčková's 2000 hit "Dlouhá noc" - in which Vondráčková played the heroine's mother with Vondráčková's attachment to the project - announced in September 2008 - occasioning the considerable expansion of her assigned role in recognition of her star power. Mona Lisa premiered at the Broadway Theatre in Prague on 4 March 2009 with Vondráčková - who alternated her role with Hana Zagorová - debuting on 5 March 2009.

Although Vondráčková turned down the lead role of Donna in the premiere Czech production of Mamma Mia! which opened 12 December 2014 at Prague Congress Center (cs), it was announced in May 2015 that Vondráčková was preparing to assume the role as of October 2015: Vondráčková would in fact debut as Donna in the Prague Congress Center production of Mamma Mia! 21 November 2015, and has since alternated in the role with Alena Antalová, Leona Machálková and Daniela Šinkorová (cs).

=== Personal life ===
Vondráčková lived with lyricist Zdeněk Rytíř for four years parting in 1969. Her first husband was East German musician Helmut Sickel whom she met at the Intervision Song Contest in 1977 (he was then the bass player for Kreis); married 28 April 1983, the couple divorced in November 2001. On 22 February 2003 Vondráčková married Martin Michal a businessman twelve years younger than her, who she had met in 2000.

Her niece Lucie Vondráčková is also a successful singer and actress.

== Discography ==
Studio albums

- 1969 – Růže kvetou dál (Supraphon)
- 1970 – Ostrov Heleny Vondráčkové (Supraphon)
- 1971 – Isle of Helena (Aritia & Supraphon)
- 1972 – Helena Helena Helena (Supraphon)
- 1972 – Helena '72 (Nippon Columbia)
- 1974 – Helena a Strýci (Supraphon)
- 1975 – Film melodies (Aritia & Supraphon)
- 1977 – S písní vstříc ti běžím (Supraphon)
- 1978 – Paprsky (Supraphon)
- 1978 – Unter der Asche meiner Liebe ist noch Glut (Telefunken in West Germany, Amiga in East Germany)
- 1979 – Doch in der Nacht: Helena Singt Billy Joel (Decca), released in 1981 as Písně Billyho Joela (Supraphon), released the year on Supraphon as Helena Singt Billy Joel
- 1980 – Múzy (Supraphon)
- 1980 – Music (Supraphon)
- 1981 – Sblížení (Supraphon)
- 1982 – Přelety (Supraphon)
- 1982 – Zrychlený dech (Supraphon)
- 1984 – Ode mne k tobě (Supraphon)
- 1985 – Sprint (Supraphon)
- 1985 – I'm Your Song (Supraphon)
- 1986 – Sólo pro tvé oči (Supraphon)
- 1986 – Helena zpívá Ježka (Supraphon)
- 1988 – Skandál (Supraphon)
- 1996 – To je šoubyznys (Bonton)
- 1998 – Nevzdám se hvězdám (Universal)
- 1998 – Paříž, má láska (Multisonic)
- 2000 – Vodopád (Universal)
- 2003 – Hádej ...! (Universal)
- 2006 – Zastav se, ... a poslouchej (Universal)
- 2007 – Ha, ha, ha – Special Limited Edition (Universal)
- 2007 – Jsem jaká jsem – 2CD Best Of (Universal)
- 2009 – Zůstáváš tu se mnou (Universal)

Collaborative albums

- 1969 – Micro Magic Circus – with Golden Kids (Supraphon)
- 1970 – Golden Kids 1 – with Golden Kids (Supraphon)
- 1993 – Golden Kids – with Golden Kids (Supraphon)
- 1995 – Golden Kids Comeback – Live Concert – with Golden Kids (Supraphon)
- 1997 – Music Box No.1 – with Golden Kids (Bonton)
- 2008 – 24 Golden Hits – with Golden Kids (Supraphon)
- 2003 – Helena Vondráčková & Karel Gott – Live (Goja & Universal)
- 2007 – Helena Vondráčková & Jiří Korn – Těch pár dnů (Supraphon)

Live albums

- 1995 – Golden Kids Comeback – Live Concert
- 1997 – Helena v Lucerně Live – Největší hity 1 (Polydor)
- 1997 – Helena v Lucerně Live – Největší hity 2 (Polydor)
- 2009 – Helena Live (DVD+CD) (Universal)
- 2010 – 2CD Live Concert (Universal)

Compilation albums

- 1990 – Přejdi Jordán a další hity (Supraphon)
- 1996 – Ten, koho ráda mám – Collection Vol. 1 (Bonton)
- 1996 – Podívej, kvete růže – Collection Vol. 2 (Bonton)
- 1997 – To se nikdo nedoví – Collection Vol. 3 (Bonton)
- 1998 – Ostrov Heleny Vondráčkové – Collection Vol. 4 (Bonton)
- 1998 – Helena, Helena, Helena – Collection Vol. 5 (Bonton)
- 1999 – Helena a Strýci – Collection Vol. 6 (Bonton)
- 2000 – Miláčku – Collection Vol. 7 (Bonton)
- 2001 – Film melodies – S písní vstříc ti běžím – Collection Vol. 8 (Bonton)
- 2001 – Paprsky, Múzy – Collection Vol. 9 (Bonton)
- 2002 – Sblížení – Collection Vol. 10 (Bonton)
- 2003 – Zrychlený dech – Collection Vol. 11 (Supraphon)
- 2004 – Ode mne k tobě – Collection Vol. 12 (Supraphon)
- 2004 – Sprint – Collection Vol. 13 (Supraphon)
- 2005 – Sólo pro tvé oči – Collection Vol. 14 (Supraphon)
- 2006 – Skandál – Collection Vol. 15 (Supraphon)
- 2006 – Helena zpívá Ježka – Collection Vol. 16 (Supraphon)
- 2000 – Helena Gold (Universal)
- 2003 – Helena Platinum (Universal)
- 2005 – Gold Collection – 4CD Deluxe Edition (Universal & Supraphon)
- 2009 – 4CD Zlatá Kolekce – Gold Collection (Universal & Reader’s Digest)
- 1997 – Movie Classics (West&EastMusic)
- 2002 – The Broadway Album (Universal)
- 2003 – Helena Vondráčková – Čas je proti nám a další hity
- 2003 – Podívej, kvete růže – Portréty českých hvězd

Christmas albums

- 1995 – Christmas with Helena 1 (Polydor)
- 1996 – Vánoce s Helenou 2 (Polydor)
- 2000 – Veselé Vánoce a šťastný nový rok (Universal)
- 2001 – Christmas with Helena 4 (Universal)
- 2014 – Kouzlo Vánoc (Warner Music Czech Republic)

Soundtracks / Musicals

- 1992 – Šíleně smutná princezna (NeaNe Records)
- 1992 – Les Misérables
- 2000 – The Queens of Pop at the Opera
- 2011 – Tangled (Soundtrack) – as Mother Gothel (Walt Disney)

DVDs and video albums

- 2004 – 2DVD Přelety (Supraphon & Czech Television)
- 2005 – Helena Gold (DVD) (Universal)
- 2007 – Těch pár dnů (DVD) – with Jiří Korn (Supraphon)
- 2009 – Helena Live (DVD+CD) (Universal)
- 2011 – Já půjdu dál (DVD) (Universal)
- 2011 – Helena on Broadway – Live Concert in Prague Opera (DVD)
