= The Incredibly Sad Princess =

- Czech Poster
- Directed by: Bořivoj Zeman
- Written by: František Vlček; Bořivoj Zeman
- Starring: Helena Vondráčková, Václav Neckář
- Cinematography: František Valert
- Music by: Jan Hammer
- Production company: Barrandov Studios
- Release date: 7 June 1968
- Running time: 86 minutes
- Country: Czechoslovakia
- Language: Czech

The Incredibly Sad Princess (Czech title: Šíleně smutná princezna) is a 1968 Czechoslovak fairy tale film starring Helena Vondráčková and Václav Neckář. It was directed by Bořivoj Zeman. The film also starred Jaroslav Marvan and Josef Kemr. Songs in the movie were composed by Jan Hammer.

It was televised in the United Kingdom by the BBC as The Madly Sad Princess with Gary Watson voicing a narration over the original Czech dialogue; like many such series it was brought in by Peggy Miller.

== Plot ==
Prince Václav goes with his father on an engagement to a neighbouring "merry" kingdom, but he does not want to get married at all. His father, the king, promised to marry him off to Princess Helena as part of a peace agreement with the neighbouring kingdom. So Prince Václav, on the pretext of going to the bathroom, escapes from the royal carriage and rides a borrowed cow to see the princess on his own. He secretly enters the princess's castle garden, climbs a tree to get a better view of the princess's chambers, falls into a pond, and in the process unwittingly meets Princess Helena. He is then caught by the castle guards and imprisoned. The king lies for the sake of the neighbouring king, making excuses and feeling ashamed of the prince who has escaped. He says his son is ill. Gradually he becomes entangled in his lies. But the princess falls in love with the unknown prisoner, unaware that he is Prince Václav, her future fiancé. In order to cancel her expected engagement to a prince she does not yet know, she feigns sadness and declares that she will only marry a man who makes her laugh. Coincidentally, without his knowing it, Prince Václav succeeds. His incognito is thus revealed, however, and Princess Helena is briefly offended by this and has Václav imprisoned again and formally sentenced to execution - but in fact he is never executed in the "merry" kingdom. Two royal advisors, Y and X, announce that the prince and princess do not want each other. Eventually, the two kings are told that Prince Wenceslas is in prison and that means there will be war. Two generals, namely former advisors X and Y, take command of both armies. The prince and princess immediately reconcile and capture the two generals in the night, ending the war. The film ends with Prince Václav handing over control of both kingdoms and getting married. The treacherous generals and counsellors X and Y are punished as they deserve.

== Cast ==
- Helena Vondráčková as Princess Helena
- Václav Neckář as Prince Václav
- Bohuš Záhorský as King Dobromysl
- Jaroslav Marvan as King Jindřich
- Josef Kemr as X
- Darek Vostřel as Y
- František Dibarbora as Executioner
- Oldřich Dědek as Kokoška
- Stella Zázvorková as Nanny
- Bronislav Koreň as Janek
