= Karel Vachek =

Czech director (1940–2020)

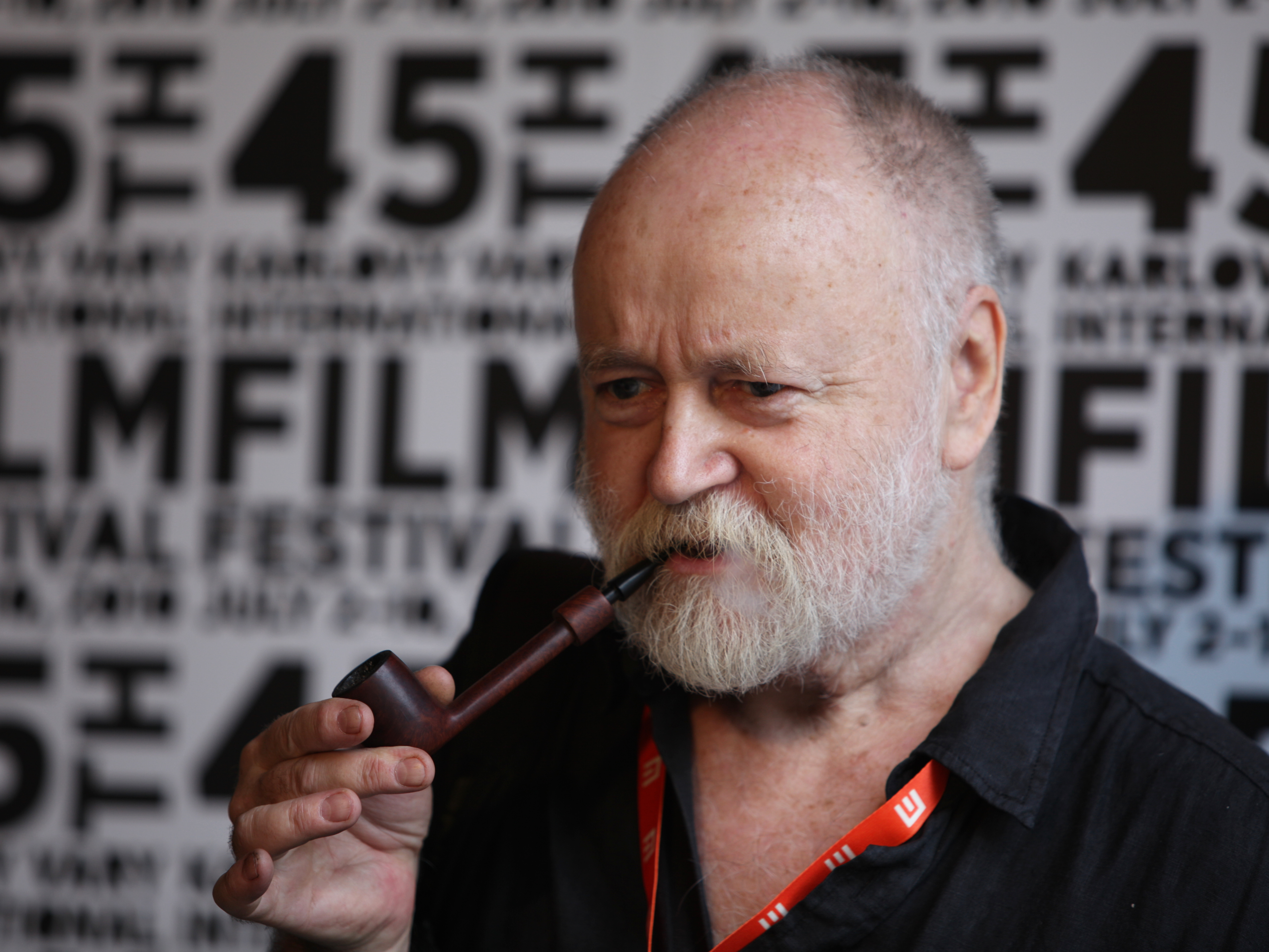
Karel Vachek

Karel Vachek (4 August 1940, Tišnov – 21 December 2020, Prague) was a Czech documentary film director and film pedagogue at FAMU.

== Filmography ==
- Moravian Hellas (1964)
- Elective Affinities (1968)
- New Hyperion or Liberty, Equality, Brotherhood (1992)
- What Is to Be Done? A Journey from Prague to Ceský Krumlov, or How I Formed a New Government (1996)
- Bohemia Docta or the Labyrinth of the World and the Lust-house of the Heart. A Divine Comedy (2000)
- Who Will Watch the Watchman? Dalibor, or the Key to Uncle Tom's Cabin (2002)
- Záviš, the Prince of Pornofolk Under the Influence of Griffith's Intolerance and Tati's Monsieur Hulot's Holiday or the Establition and Doom of Czechoslovakia 1918-1992 (2006)
- Obscurantist and His Lineage or The Pyramids' Tearful Valleys (2011)
- Komunismus a síť aneb Konec zastupitelské demokracie (2020)
