= The Inheritance or Fuckoffguysgoodday =

- Czech DVD cover
- Directed by: Věra Chytilová
- Written by: Věra Chytilová; Bolek Polívka
- Produced by: Pavel Solc
- Cinematography: Ervín Sanders
- Edited by: Jan Mattlach
- Music by: Jiří Bulis; Ivo Spalj (SFX); Jan Kacian (SFX)
- Release date: 1 December 1992
- Running time: 120 minutes
- Country: Czechoslovakia
- Languages: Czech; German

The Inheritance or Fuckoffguysgoodday (Czech: Dědictví aneb Kurvahošigutntag) is a 1992 Czechoslovak comedy film directed by Věra Chytilová. It was entered into the 18th Moscow International Film Festival.

== Synopsis ==
Bohus is a lazy bumpkin and spends his days drinking. One day he is told he has inherited a brickworks, several shops and a five-star hotel, ...

== Cast ==
- Bolek Polívka as Bohus
- Miroslav Donutil as Dr. Ulrich
- Šárka Vojtková as Irena
- Anna as Anna (herself)
- Arbias as Arbias 'the Great Warrior' (himself)
- Jozef Kroner as Kostál
- Dagmar Veškrnová as Vlasta
- Anna Pantůčková as Aunt
- Pavel Zatloukal as co-worker/communist
- Břetislav Rychlík as Francek
- Ján Sedal as Ranger
- Arnošt Goldflam as Arnošt
- Martin Dohnal as Railway worker
- Jiří Pecha as Angel / Dr. Strázný
- Leoš Suchařípa as Dr. Siroký
- Jaromír Dulava as Waiter in Luxus
- Ivana Chýlková as Dr. Ulrichová
- Karel Gott as himself
- Alena Ambrová as Liduna
- Miloš Černoušek as Waiter in Slavia
- Simona Peková as Selling woman
- Miroslav Výlet as Mayor
