= Václav Neckář =

Czech actor and singer (born 1943)

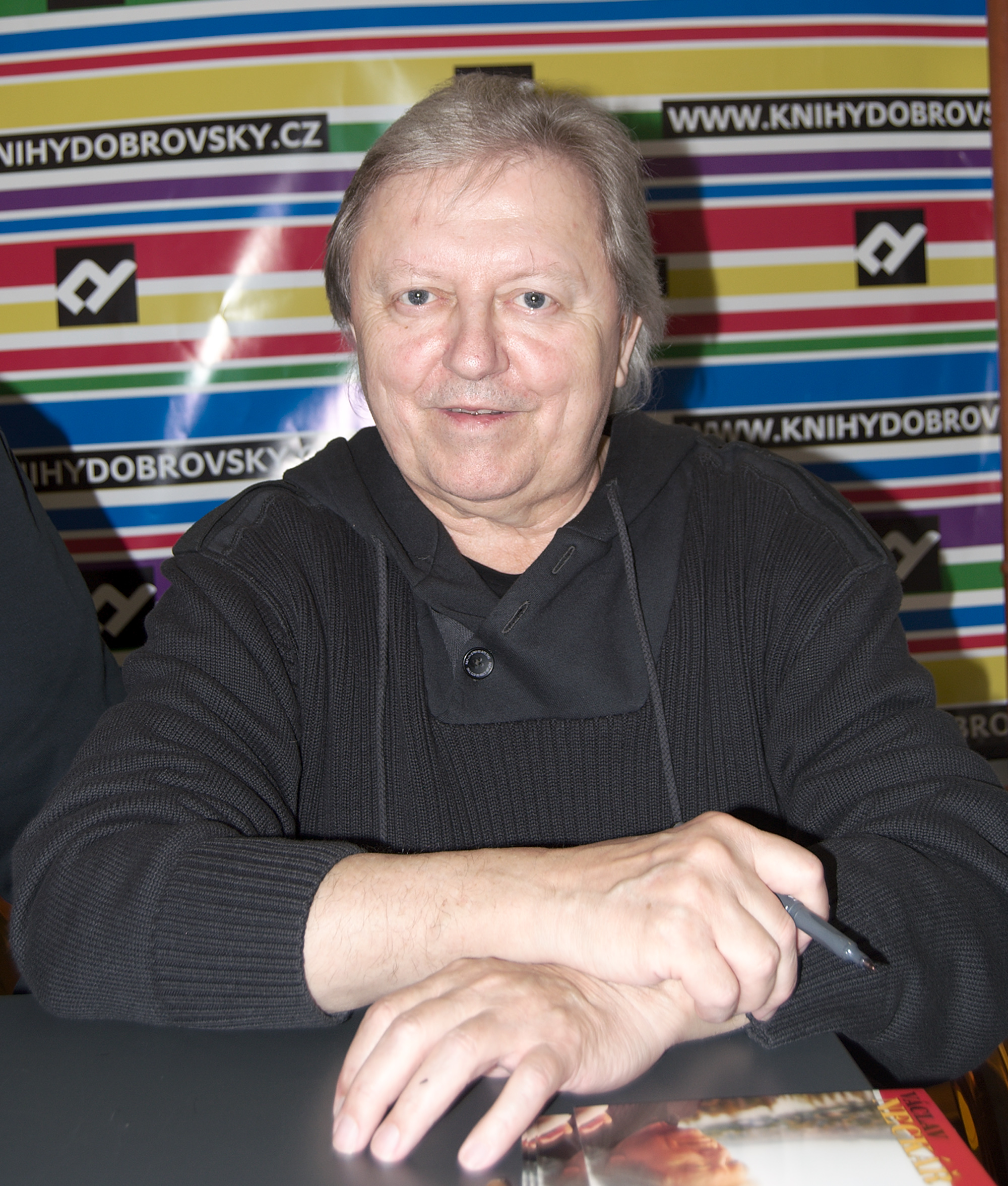
- Václav Neckář

Background information
- Born: 23 October 1943 (age 82); Prague, Protectorate of Bohemia and Moravia (today the Czech Republic)
- Genres: Pop music
- Occupations: Singer, actor
- Years active: 1966–present

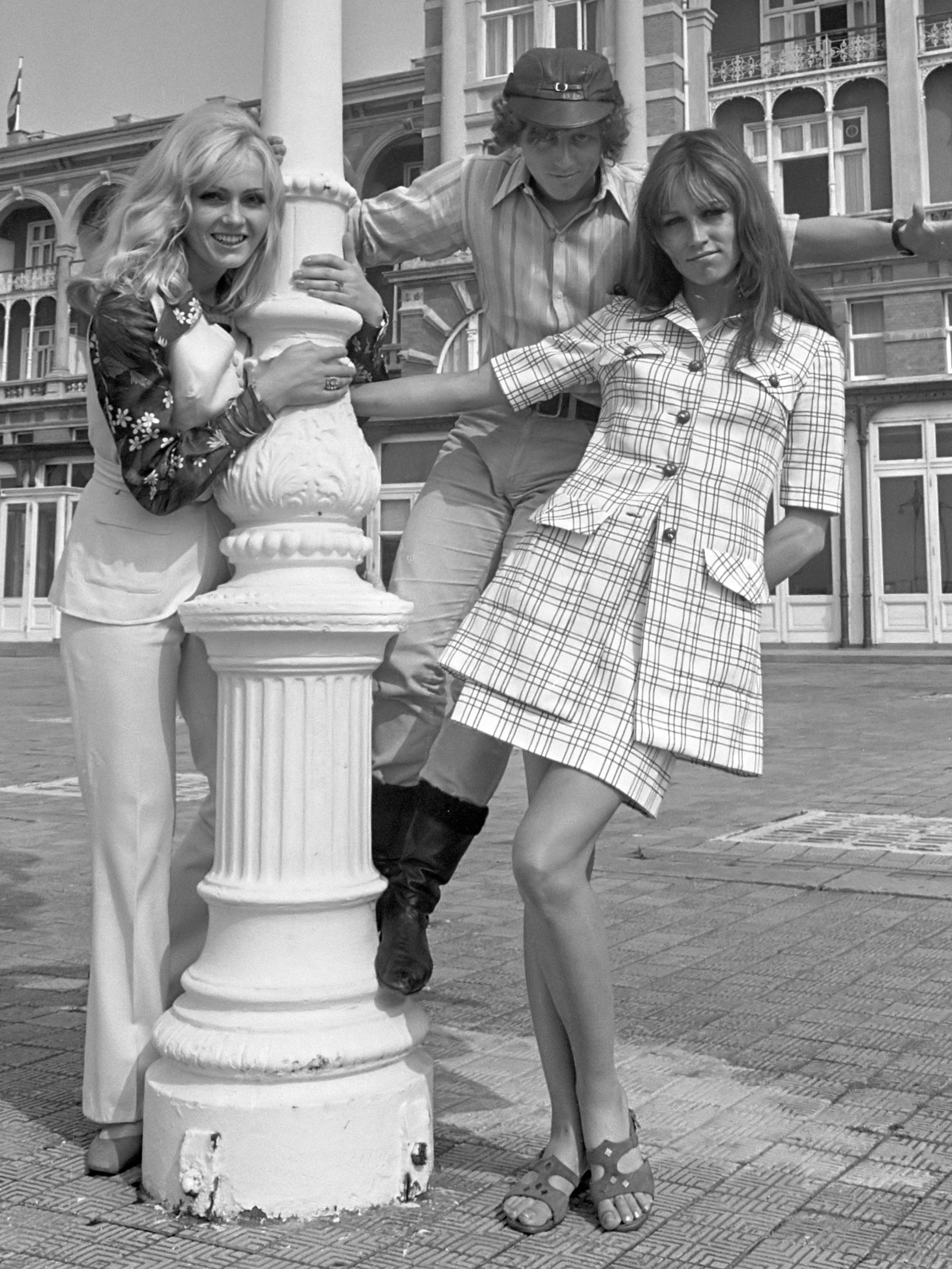
Marta Kubišová, Václav Neckář, Helena Vondráčková (from right to left), as Golden Kids in 1969, shortly before Marta Kubišová was banned

Václav Neckář (born 23 October 1943 in Prague) is a Czech singer and actor. He is best known for his performance as Miloš Hrma in Closely Watched Trains. Between 1978 and 1979 he cooperated with Polish singer Anna Jantar during their performances in Poland and Czechoslovakia (ČSSR). In 2007, he was accused of having been an StB collaborator from 1978.

From 1968 to 1970 he was a singer in Golden Kids with Marta Kubišová and Helena Vondráčková, and from 1970 a singer in the group Bacily.

In 2011, Neckař described himself as a non-practising Hussite. Following the death of Neckař’s wife Jaroslava in 2015, Rev. David Frýda described him and his wife as strong believers and frequent congregants.

== Selected filmography ==
- Closely Watched Trains (1966)
- Private Torment (1967)
- Little Summer Blues (1968)
- Kulhavý dábel (1968)
- The Incredibly Sad Princess (1968)
- The Lanfier Colony (1969)
- Pan Vok odchází (1979)
- Sing, Cowboy, sing (1981)
- Larks on a String (1990)
- Lady Macbeth von Mzensk (1992)
- Czech Woodstock (2004)

== Television ==
- Písen pro Rudolfa III.: Kreslo (#1.1) (1967)
- Písen pro Rudolfa III.: Muz v redingotu (#1.2) (1967)
- Písen pro Rudolfa III.: Albrecht z Valdstejna (#1.4) (1967)
- Siroká cesta spravedlnosti (1968)
- Písen pro Rudolfa III.: Loupez století (#1.5) (1968)
- Písen pro Rudolfa III.: Hrabe Monte Christo (#1.7) (1968)
- Písen pro Rudolfa III.: Betlém (#1.8) (1968)
- Pan Tau: Pan Tau a tisíc kouzel (#2.7) (1972)
- Bigbít: Povolený rock (1973–84) (#1.23) (1998)
- Dobroty: Dobroty 2 (#1.2) (2001)
- Tenkrát na východe (2004)
- Po stopách hvezd: Marta Kubisová (2008)
- VIP zprávy: Episode#1.23 (2010)
- Top star magazín: Top star magazín (#4.6) (2011)
- Top star magazín: Top star magazín (#4.12) (2011)
- VIP zprávy (2011)
- Show Jana Krause (2011)
- Ceský slavík Mattoni 2011 (2011)
- To byl nás hit: 1. semifinále (#1.9) (2011)
- Ceský lev 2011 (2012)
- Ceny Andel 2011 (2012)
- VIP zprávy: Episode dated 9 March 2012 (2012)
- Panelák: Silvester 2012 (#10.73) (2012)

== Selected discography ==
- Sha-La-La-La-Lee (1966)
- Krokodil Theophil (1973)
- Pár dnů prázdnin (I Hear You Knocking)
