= Riders of the Sky =

- Theatrical release poster
- Nebeští jezdci
- Directed by: Jindřich Polák
- Written by: Filip Jánský; Zdeněk Mahler; Jindřich Polák
- Starring: Jiří Bednář; Jiří Hrzán; Svatopluk Matyáš
- Cinematography: Jan Němeček
- Music by: Evžen Illín
- Distributed by: Ústřední půjčovna filmů
- Release date: 20 December 1968 (Czechoslovakia)
- Running time: 91 minutes
- Country: Czechoslovakia
- Languages: Czech; Slovak; English; German

Riders of the Sky (Czech: Nebeští jezdci) is a Czechoslovak movie directed by Jindřich Polák in 1968 about Czechoslovak pilots in No. 311 Squadron RAF service during the Battle of Britain, and the ongoing aerial battle in northern Europe.

== Production ==
The movie is based on the 1964 novel Nebeští jezdci by Czech World War II RAF and Soviet Air Force air gunner Richard Husmann, writing as Filip Jánský. Part of the inspiration for the novel was the story of František "Frankie" Truhlář, No. 311 Squadron RAF gunner and later No. 312 (Czechoslovak) Squadron RAF pilot, and a member of Guinea Pig Club. In 1969 Hodder & Stoughton published an English translation of the book as Riders in the Sky. The name of the book was inspired by a country song Riders in the Sky by American songwriter Stan Jones. The song can be heard in the movie.

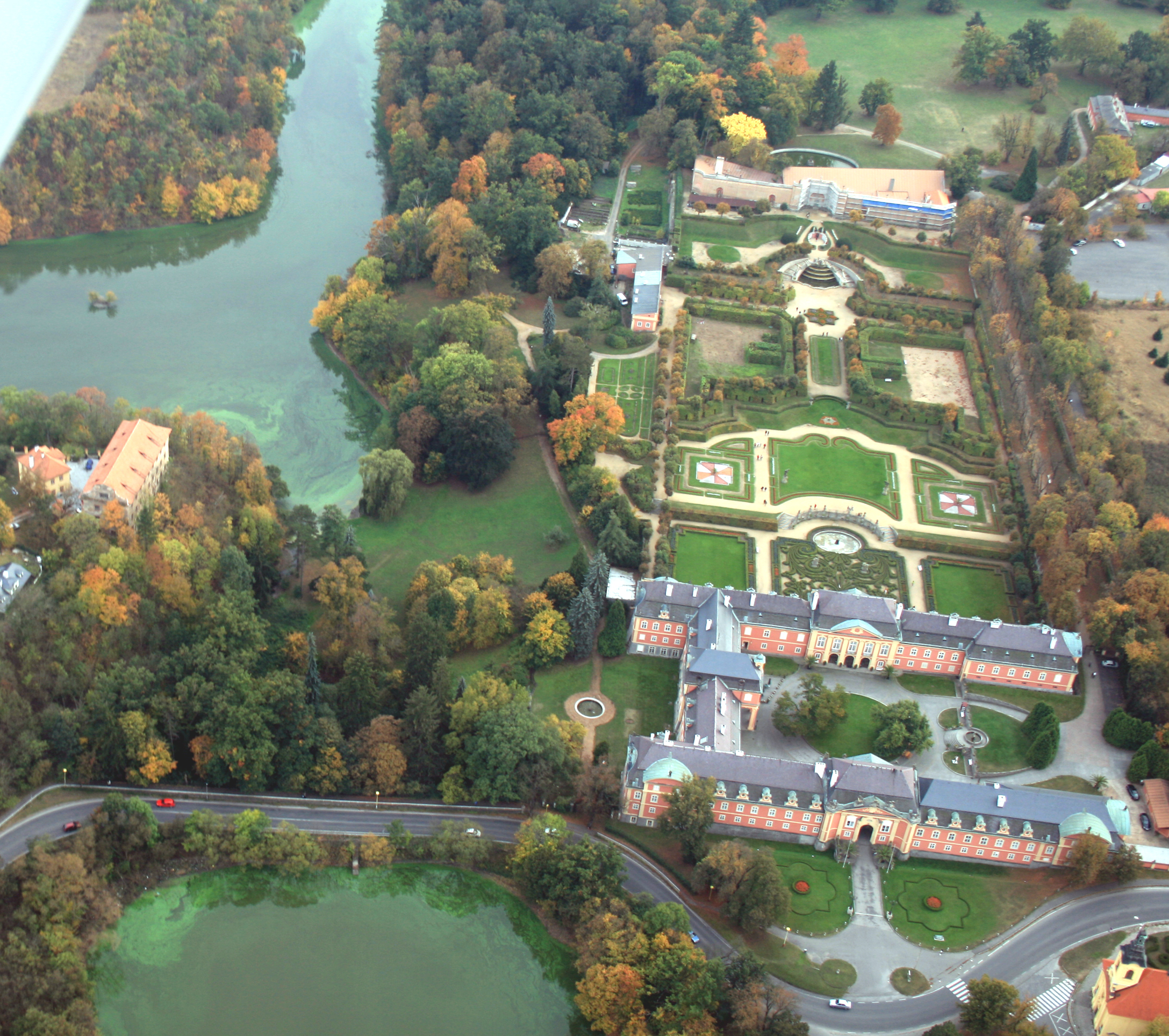
Dobříš Chateau where some of the scenes were filmed

It was filmed at Klecany military airfield north of Prague, English park at Dobříš Chateau, Prague hospital U Apolináře and Rügen island in Germany.

Some of the aerial shots were from a 1941 documentary film Target for Tonight.

== Cast ==
- Jiří Bednář as Sgt. Malý, nicknamed "Študent"
- Jiří Hrzán as Sgt. Novák, nicknamed "Prcek"
- Svatopluk Matyáš as Pilot Pavel Kolár
- Elsie Randolph as Nurse Henderson
- Charles Cameron as Bradley
- Jana Nováková as Patricia Watkinson, WAAF member
- Joan Seton as Watkinson's mother
- Winston Chrislock as Navigator Tommy
- Vojtěch Holý as Navigator George
- Josef Váša as Second pilot Frank

== Release ==
The movie premiere took place in Kolín on 15 November 1968. Several members of Czechoslovak RAF Squadrons were present, including Air Marshal Karel Janoušek, KCB. The film was released to distribution on 20 December 1968, but in February 1969 it was banned.

== Reception ==
Nebeští jezdci is often referred as the best Czech war film.

== See also ==
- Dark Blue World - 2001 Czech movie about Czechoslovak WWII pilots
