= Viktor Ponrepo =

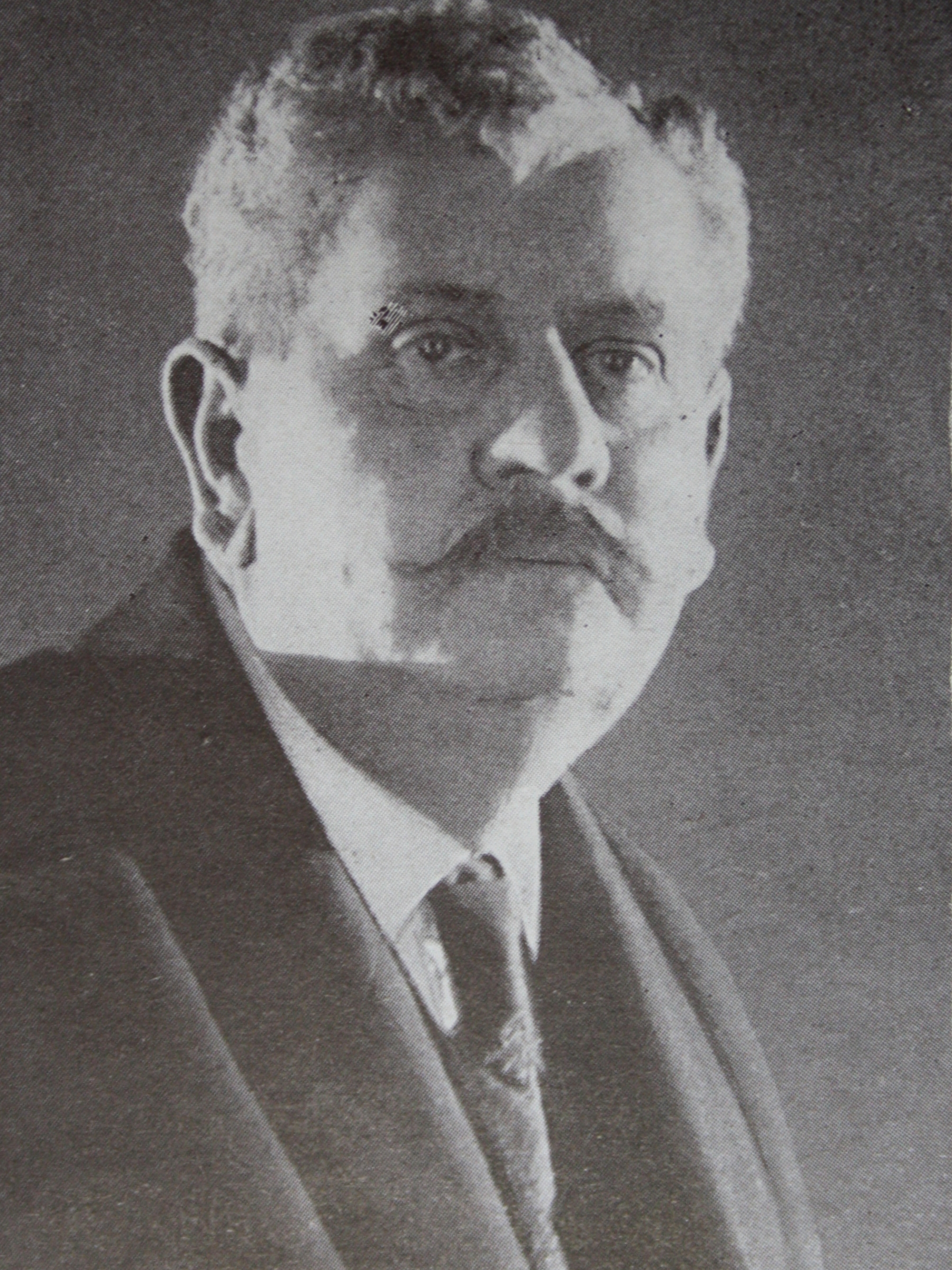
- Born: Dismas Šlambor; 16 June 1858; Prague, Bohemia, Austrian Empire
- Died: 3 December 1926 (aged 68); Prague, Czechoslovakia
- Occupation: Film director

Viktor Ponrepo (born Dismas Šlambor; 16 June 1858 – 3 December 1926) was a Czech magician and a pioneer of cinema. He founded the first permanent cinema in Prague in Karlova ulice (Charles street).

His artist's surname is derived from the castle Bon Repos (French for good rest) near Stará Lysá.

The cinema of the Czech National Film Archive in Prague, Kino Ponrepo, is named after him.

== Bibliography ==
- BARTOŠEK, Luboš. Ponrepo. Od kouzelného divadla ke kinu. Prague: Orbis, 1957. 80 s.
- BARTOŠEK, Luboš. Náš film. Kapitoly z dějin (1896 – 1945). Prague: Mladá fronta, 1985. 424 s.
- KOLEKTIV AUTORŮ. Český hraný film I. 1898 – 1930. Prague: Národní filmový archiv, 1995. 285 s. ISBN 80-7004-082-3.
