= The Great Opportunity (1950 film) =

1950 film

- East German poster
- Directed by: Karel Michael Wallo
- Written by: Karel Michael Wallo
- Produced by: Ladislav Hanus
- Starring: Vlasta Chramostová; Vladimír Smeral; Zdenek Díte
- Cinematography: Julius Vegricht
- Edited by: Jirina Lukesová
- Music by: Miroslav Barvík
- Production company: Ceskoslovenský Státní Film
- Distributed by: Ceskoslovenský Státní Film; Progress Film
- Release date: 14 April 1950
- Running time: 93 minutes
- Country: Czechoslovakia
- Language: Czech

The Great Opportunity (Czech: Veliká prílezitost) is a 1950 Czech drama film directed by Karel Michael Wallo and starring Vlasta Chramostová, Vladimír Smeral and Zdenek Díte. It was shot at the Hostivar Studios in Prague. The film's sets were designed by the art director Karel Skvor. It was distributed in East Germany by Progress Film.

== Cast ==
- Josef Stefl as Toník Burán
- Vlasta Chramostová as Lída Kolárová
- Vladimír Smeral as Zdenek Kruzný
- Jirí Vrstála as Vlastimil Zubatík
- Zdenek Díte as Mirek Horák
- Vítezslav Bocek as Bartos - Director of Bata's Factory
- Jaroslav Vojta as Worker Ocílka
- Frantisek Klika as Cestmír Machán
- Josef Toman as Father Burán
- Otto Cermák as Grandfather Burán
- Bolek Prchal as Superintendent
- Ladislav Bohác as Prosecutor
- Josef Chvalina as Standa
- Otakar Dadák as Frantisek Mokros - worker
- Milos Preininger as Jan Opavský - worker
- Hermína Vojtová as Customer at textile schop
- Zdenek Hodr as Lawyer
- Zdenek Savrda as Judge
- Lubor Tokos as Votýpka
- Josef Marsálek as Milan Hosa - worker
- Stefan Bulejko as Walter Taler - officer SS
- Bohumil Machník as Guard
- Lubomír Cerník as Brigadier
- Kveta Fialová as Blanka - Culture referent
- Jaroslav Seník as Vincenc Mlacek - merchant with textil
- Václav Kyzlink as Engineer
- Václav Svec as Prisoner
- Josef Langmiler as Officer SS
- Frantisek Slégr as Peasant Opíchal
- Frantisek Marek as Commercial Council
- Jan Fischer as Secretary
- Karel Svoboda as Accountant
- Frantisek Peterka as Construction Worker
- Josef Horánek as Vicar
- Stanislav Remunda as Zdenek
- Pavel Smok as Dancer
- Milan Mach as Worker
- Zora Rozsypalová as Doctor Marta
- Hynek Nemec as Bricklayer
- Stanislava Seimlová as Worker
- Jitka Frantová as Worker

== Bibliography ==
- Černík, Jan. Český technický scénář 1945–1962. Palacký University Olomouc, 2021.
- Škvorecký, Josef. Nejdražší umění a jiné eseje o filmu. 2010.
