= The Trap (1950 film) =

1950 film

- Directed by: Martin Frič
- Written by: K. J. Beneš
- Screenplay by: Miloslav Drtílek; Václav Gajer
- Produced by: Vladimír Kabelík
- Starring: Vlasta Chramostová
- Edited by: Jan Kohout
- Music by: Dalibor Cyril Vačkář
- Release date: 1950
- Running time: 94 minute
- Country: Czechoslovakia
- Language: Czech

The Trap (Czech: Past) is a 1950 Czech drama film directed by Martin Frič. It was entered into the 1951 Cannes Film Festival.

== Cast ==
- Vlasta Chramostová – Růžena
- Miloslav Holub – Dönnert
- Věra Kalendová – Kraftová
- Otomar Krejča – Bor
- Jaroslav Mareš – Hans
- Karel Peyer – Cortus
- Vladimír Ráž – Antoš
- Majka Tomášová – Herta
