= Dog's Heads =

1955 film

- Directed by: Martin Frič
- Written by: Alois Jirásek; Martin Frič
- Starring: Vladimír Ráž
- Cinematography: Jan Stallich
- Release date: 1955
- Running time: 97 minutes
- Country: Czechoslovakia
- Language: Czech
- Budget: 7,300,000 KČs

Dog's Heads (Czech: Psohlavci) is a 1955 Czech drama film directed by Martin Frič, based on the novel of the same name by Alois Jirásek. It was entered into the 1955 Cannes Film Festival.

== Cast ==
- Vladimír Ráž - Jan Sladký-Kozina
- Jana Dítětová - Hancí
- Jarmila Kurandová - Mother
- Zdeněk Štěpánek
- František Kovařík - Kryštof Hrubý
- Ladislav Pešek - Rehurek
- Jiřina Steimarová - Dorla
- Jaroslav Průcha - Pribek
- František Smolík - Pribek, senior
- Jana Štepánková - Manka
- Bohumil Švarc - Serlovský
- Jiří Dohnal - Adam Ecl Ctverák
- Jaroslav Vojta - Pajdár
- Miloš Nedbal - Lamminger z Abenreuthu
- Miloš Kopecký - Kos, správce
