= Milena Dvorská =

Czech actress

- Born: 7 September 1938; Prostějov, Czechoslovakia (now Czech Republic)
- Died: 22 December 2009 (aged 71); Prague, Czech Republic
- Occupation: Actress
- Years active: 1955–2009

Milena Dvorská (7 September 1938 – 22 December 2009) was a Czech film actress. She appeared in 70 films and television shows between 1955 and 2009.

== Selected filmography ==
- Anděl na horách (1956)
- Nejlepší ženská mého života (1968)
- The Last Act of Martin Weston (1970)
- The Little Mermaid (1976)
- Marecek, Pass Me the Pen! (1976)
- Do Be Quick (1977)
- Jak se budí princezny (1977)
- Jára Cimrman Lying, Sleeping (1983)
- My Sweet Little Village (1985)
- Noc smaragdového měsíce (1985)
