= Páté kolo u vozu =

- Directed by: Borivoj Zeman
- Written by: Jirí Karásek; Borivoj Zeman
- Edited by: Josef Dobrichovský
- Release date: 1957
- Running time: 91 minute
- Country: Czechoslovakia
- Language: Czech

Páté kolo u vozu is a 1957 Czechoslovak film. The film starred Josef Kemr.

== Cast ==
- Zdenka Baldová
- Vlasta Fabiánová
- Milos Nedbal
- Jaroslava Tvrzníková
- Jirí Kríz
- Jaroslav Vojta
