= Vlasta Chramostová =

Czech actress (1926–2019)

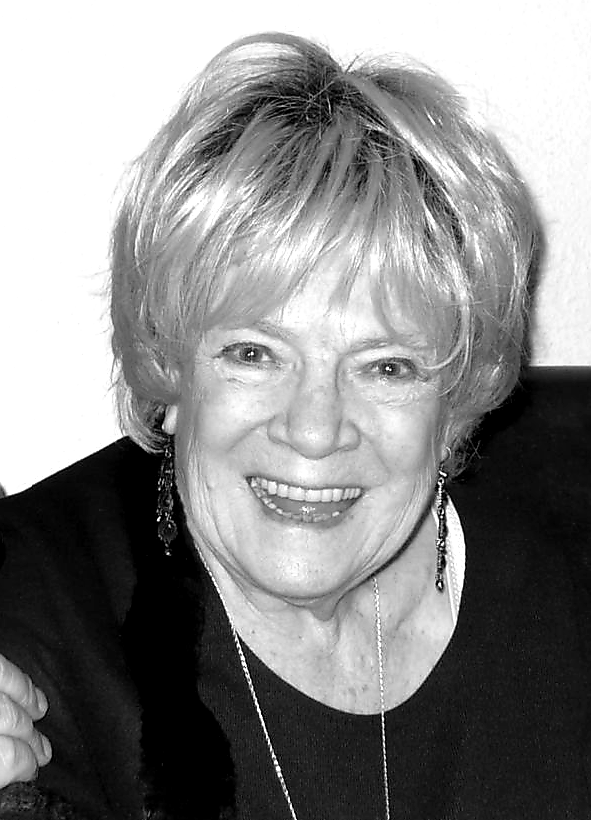
- Born: 17 November 1926; Brno, Czechoslovakia
- Died: 6 October 2019 (aged 92); Brno, Czech Republic
- Occupation: Actress
- Years active: 1950–2019
- Spouse: Stanislav Milota

Vlasta Chramostová (17 November 1926 – 6 October 2019) was a Czech film actress. She appeared in 35 films since 1950. She starred in the 1950 film The Trap which was entered into the 1951 Cannes Film Festival.

A signatory of Charter 77, she was active in the Velvet Revolution, where the Czechoslovak Socialist Republic was overthrown in November 1989. At a rally at the Vinohrady Theatre in Prague, she was quoted as asking the crowd: "If not now, when? If not us, then who?"

== Selected filmography ==
- The Great Opportunity (1950)
- The Trap (1950)
- Operation B (1952)
- The Secret of Blood (1953)
- The Cassandra Cat (1963)
- The Cremator (1969)
- Sekal Has to Die (1998)
- Leaving (2011)
