= Alena Vránová =

Czech actress

- Born: 30 July 1932 (age 92); Prague, Czechoslovakia
- Occupation: Actress
- Years active: 1948-present

Alena Vránová (born 30 July 1932) is a Czech film and theatre actress. At the 1997 Thalia Awards she won the category of Best Actress in a Play. She studied at the Faculty of Theatre (Prague). Vránová was recognised with an award for lifetime achievement in theatre at the 2016 Thalia Awards.

== Selected filmography ==
- Thanks for Every New Morning (1994)
- Konec cesty (1960)
- Lost Children (1956)
- Playing with the Devil (1956)
- Dovolená s Andělem (1952)
- The Proud Princess (1952)
