= The Ear =

Czech film completed in 1969 and released in 1990

- Film poster
- Czech: Ucho
- Directed by: Karel Kachyňa
- Screenplay by: Karel Kachyňa; Jan Procházka
- Story by: Jan Procházka
- Produced by: Karel Vejřík
- Starring: Jiřina Bohdalová; Radoslav Brzobohatý
- Cinematography: Josef Illík
- Edited by: Miroslav Hájek
- Music by: Svatopluk Havelka
- Production company: Filmové studio Barrandov
- Distributed by: Ústřední půjčovna filmů
- Release date: January 1, 1990 (Czechoslovakia)
- Running time: 94 minutes
- Country: Czechoslovakia
- Language: Czech

The Ear (Czech: Ucho) is a Czech language film by Karel Kachyňa, completed in 1969. This film was banned by the nation's ruling Communist party (who were supported by the occupying Soviet forces). It wasn't released until 1990.

== Plot ==
The film is about a bitter married couple that consists of Ludvík, a senior official of Prague's ruling Communist regime, and his alcoholic wife Anna. They return home after attending a political party dinner and notice their home has been broken into. Several strange occurrences, including the disappearance of the keys of their second house and dead phone lines, lead them to believe that they are under surveillance by their own government. As the night progresses, the flaws of their marriage and of each other are exposed.

== Cast ==
- Radoslav Brzobohatý as Ludvík
- Jiřina Bohdalová as Anna
- Jiří Císler as Standa
- Miroslav Holub as Russian general
- Milica Kolofiková as Woman at the party
- Jaroslav Moučka as Vagera

== Awards ==
1990 Cannes Film Festival - Nominated for the Golden Palm for Karel Kachyňa.

== See also ==
- Honey Night (2015)

== Book ==
- Ear, Karolinum Press, 2022. ISBN 978-80-246-5135-4.
