= Dovolená s Andělem =

1952 film

Dovolená s Andělem is a 1952 Czechoslovak film. The film starred Josef Kemr.

== Cast ==
- Jaroslav Marvan as Gustav Andel
- Josef Pehr as Václav Masek
- Josef Kemr as Bohous Vyhlídka
- Vladimír Ráž as Karel Pavlát
- Jana Dítětová as Milada Pavlátová
- František Dibarbora as Stefan Palko
- Stanislava Seimlová as Marienka Vanecková
- Bela Jurdová as Cultural officer
- Vladimír Repa as Vojtech Herzán
- Rudolf Princ as Administrator of convalescence home
- Alena Vránová as Marie Dobesová
- Eva Foustková as Anna Kazdová
- Růžena Šlemrová as Pichlová
- Josef Hlinomaz as Jerábek
- Antonin Vilsky as Stehlík
