= The Proud Princess =

1952 film

- Directed by: Bořivoj Zeman
- Starring: Alena Vránová; Vladimír Ráž
- Edited by: Josef Dobrichovský
- Release date: 26 September 1952
- Running time: 1h 34min
- Country: Czechoslovakia
- Language: Czech

The Proud Princess (Czech: Pyšná princezna) is a 1952 Czech fairytale film directed by Bořivoj Zeman. It is based on the fairy tale "Potrestaná pýcha" by Božena Němcová.

== Cast ==
- Alena Vránová - Princess Krasomila
- Vladimír Ráž - King Miroslav
- Stanislav Neumann - Old King
- Mária Sýkorová - Krasomila's Nanny
- Jaroslav Seník - Jakub, Minister
- Miloš Kopecký - Chancellor
- Oldřich Dědek - Master of Ceremonies
- Karel Effa - Guard of King's Treasure
- Gustav Heverle - Vítek
- Josef Hlinomaz - Tax Collector
