= Vladimír Ráž =

Czech actor (1923–2000)

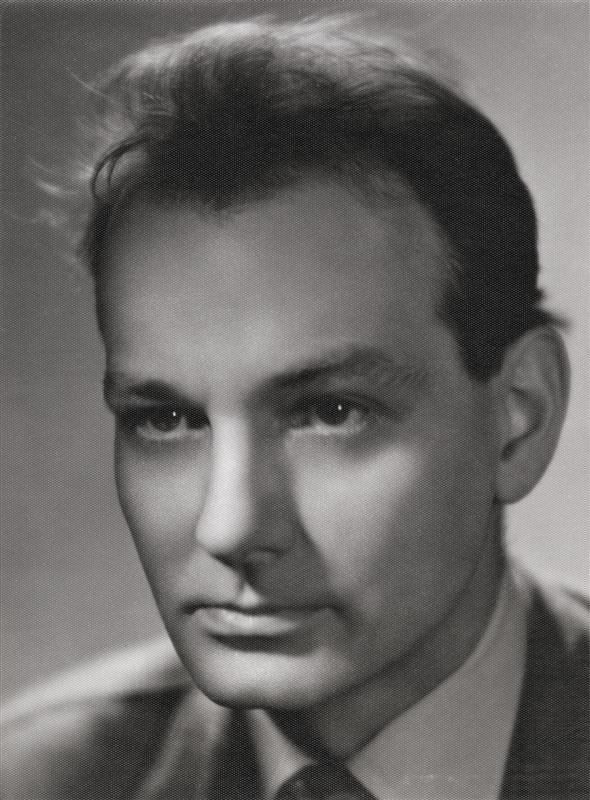
- Born: 1 July 1923; Nejdek, Czechoslovakia
- Died: 4 July 2000 (aged 77); Prague, Czech Republic
- Occupation: Actor
- Years active: 1947–2000

Vladimír Ráž (1 July 1923 – 4 July 2000) was a Czech film actor. He appeared in more than 60 films and television shows between 1947 and 2000. He is buried at the Vyšehrad Cemetery in Prague.

== Selected filmography ==
- A Dead Man Among the Living (1949)
- The Trap (1950)
- The Proud Princess (1952)
- The Secret of Blood (1953)
- Dog's Heads (1955)
- Today for the Last Time (1958)
- První parta (1959)
- Všichni proti všem (1977)
