= List of Academy Award winners and nominees from Czechia =

This is a list of Czech Academy Award winners and nominees. This list details the performances of Czech actors, actresses, and films that have either been submitted or nominated for, or have won, an Academy Award.

== Best International Feature Film ==
This list focuses on essentially Czech films and directors and producers of other non-English language films, including submissions from the Czech Socialist Republic prior to the dissolution of Czechoslovakia.

International Feature Film
| Year | Name | Film | Status | Milestone / Notes |
| 1965 | Ján Kadár & Elmar Klos | The Shop on Main Street | Won | First Czech win for the Category. |
| 1965 | Miloš Forman | Loves of a Blonde | Nominated | |
| 1966 | Jiří Menzel | Closely Watched Trains | Won | |
| 1967 | Miloš Forman | The Firemen's Ball | Nominated | |
| 1985 | Jiří Menzel | My Sweet Little Village | Nominated | |
| 1991 | Jan Svěrák | The Elementary School | Nominated | |
| 1996 | Jan Svěrák | Kolya | Won | |
| 2000 | Jan Hřebejk | Divided We Fall | Nominated | |
| 2003 | Ondřej Trojan | Želary | Nominated | |

== Best Supporting Actress ==
Supporting Actress
| Year | Name | Film | Status | Milestone / Notes |
| 1959 | Susan Kohner | Imitation of Life | Nominated | American actress born to Czech and Mexican parents. |

== Best Director ==
Best Director
| Year | Name | Film | Status | Milestone / Notes |
| 1975 | Miloš Forman | One Flew Over the Cuckoo's Nest | Won | Forman is a Czech director who immigrated to the United States in 1968 and obtained American citizenship. |
| 1984 | Miloš Forman | Amadeus | Won | Forman is a Czech director who immigrated to the United States in 1968 and obtained American citizenship. |
| 1996 | Miloš Forman | The People vs. Larry Flynt | Nominated | Forman is a Czech director who immigrated to the United States in 1968 and obtained American citizenship. |

== Best Juvenile Acting ==
Juvenile Award
| Year | Name | Film | Status | Milestone / Notes |
| 1948 | Ivan Jandl | The Search | Won | First Czech to ever win an Academy Award. |

== Best Screenwriting ==
Original Screenplay
| Year | Name | Film | Status | Milestone / Notes |
| 2007 | Jan Pinkava | Ratatouille | Nominated | Czech with a British citizenship. Shared with Brad Bird and Jim Capobianco. |

== Best Production Design ==
Production Design
| Year | Name | Film | Status | Notes |
| 1984 | Karel Černý | Amadeus | Won | Shared with Patrizia von Brandenstein. |
| 2014 | Maria Djurkovic | The Imitation Game | Nominated | Czech-British. Shared with Tatiana Macdonald. |
| 2019 | Nora Sopková | Jojo Rabbit | Nominated | Shared with Ra Vincent. |
| 2024 | Beatrice Brentnerová | Nosferatu | Nominated | Shared with Craig Lathrop |

== Best Cinematography ==
Cinematography
| Year | Name | Film | Status | Notes |
| 1981 | Miroslav Ondříček | Ragtime | Nominated | |
| 1984 | Miroslav Ondříček | Amadeus | Nominated | |

== Best Costume Design ==
Costume Design
| Year | Name | Film | Status | Notes |
| 1984 | Theodor Pištěk | Amadeus | Won | |
| 1989 | Theodor Pištěk | Valmont | Nominated | |

== Best Makeup and Hairstyling ==
Best Makeup and Hairstyling
| Year | Name | Film | Status | Notes |
| 2022 | Linda Eisenhamerová | All Quiet on the Western Front | Nominated | |

== Best Animated Short Film ==
Animated Short Film
| Year | Name | Film | Status | Notes |
| 1997 | Jan Pinkava | Geri's Game | Won | |
| 2019 | Daria Kashcheeva | Daughter | Nominated | |

== Best Documentary Feature ==
Documentary Feature
| Year | Name | Film | Status | Notes |
| 1999 | Roko Belic | Genghis Blues | Nominated | |
| 2025 | Alžběta Karásková | Mr Nobody Against Putin | Won | |

== Best Original Score ==
Original Score
| Year | Name | Film | Status | Notes |
| 1944 | Jerome Kern | Can't Help Singing | Nominated | |
| 1961 | Irwin Kostal | West Side Story | Won | |
| 1964 | Irwin Kostal | Mary Poppins | Nominated | |
| 1965 | Irwin Kostal | The Sound of Music | Won | |
| 1971 | Irwin Kostal | Bedknobs and Broomsticks | Nominated | |
| 1977 | Irwin Kostal | Pete's Dragon | Nominated | |

== Best Original Song ==
Original Song
| Year | Name | Song | Film | Status | Notes |
| 1935 | Jerome Kern | "Lovely to Look At" | Roberta | Nominated | Shared with Dorothy Fields & Jimmy McHugh |
| 1936 | Jerome Kern | "The Way You Look Tonight" | Swing Time | Won | Shared with Dorothy Fields |
| 1941 | Jerome Kern | "The Last Time I Saw Paris" | Lady Be Good | Won | Shared with Oscar Hammerstein II |
| 1942 | Jerome Kern | "Dearly Beloved" | You Were Never Lovelier | Nominated | Shared with Johnny Mercer |
| 1944 | Jerome Kern | "Long Ago (and Far Away)" | Cover Girl | Nominated | Shared with Ira Gershwin |
| 1945 | Jerome Kern | "More and More" | Can't Help Singing | Nominated | (p.n.) Shared with Yip Harburg |
| 1946 | Jerome Kern | "All Through The Day" | Centennial Summer | Nominated | (p.n.) Shared with Oscar Hammerstein II |
| 2007 | Markéta Irglová | "Falling Slowly" | Once | Won | Shared with Glen Hansard |

== Best Sound ==
Best Sound
| Year | Name | Film | Status | Notes |
| 2008 | Petr Forejt | Wanted | Nominated | |
| 2022 | Viktor Prášil | All Quiet on the Western Front | Nominated | |

== Best Visual Effects ==
Best Visual Effects
| Year | Name | Film | Status | Notes |
| 1963 | Emil Kosa Jr. | Cleopatra | Won | |
| 2022 | Viktor Müller | All Quiet on the Western Front | Nominated | |
| 2022 | Kamil Jafar | All Quiet on the Western Front | Nominated | |

== Nominations and Winners ==
| No. of wins | No. of nominations |
|---|---|
| 16 | 47 |

== See also ==
- Cinema of the Czech Republic
- List of Czech films considered the best
