= Karel Černý (art director) =

Czech art director

- Born: 7 April 1922; Plzeň, Czechoslovakia
- Died: 5 September 2014 (aged 92); Tábor, Czech Republic
- Occupations: Art director, production designer
- Years active: 1938–2001

Karel Černý (7 April 1922 – 5 September 2014) was a Czech art director and production designer. He won an Academy Award in the category Best Art Direction for the film Amadeus. He died aged 92 in 2014.

== Selected filmography ==
- Black Peter (1964)
- Loves of a Blonde (1965)
- Amadeus (1984)

== See also ==
- Cinema of the Czech Republic
- List of Czech Academy Award winners and nominees
