= Vladimír Pucholt =

Czech-Canadian actor and physician

- Born: 30 December 1942 (age 83); Prague, Protectorate of Bohemia and Moravia
- Education: Theatre Faculty of the Academy of Performing Arts in Prague; University of Sheffield Medical School
- Occupation: Actor / physician
- Years active: 1952–1970, 1999 / 1974–present
- Spouse: Rosemary
- Children: Camilla, Lindsay

Vladimír Pucholt (born 30 December 1942) is a Czech-Canadian physician and former actor. His specialization are pediatrics and neonatology.

== Life ==
Vladimír Pucholt was born in Prague in the Protectorate of Bohemia and Moravia (present-day Czech Republic). His father was an attorney, who after the Soviet-backed communist putch in 1948 refused to serve the regime. So his son, Vladimír, was not allowed to study medicine, had to spend a year in a factory and was allowed to the Theatre Faculty of the Academy of Performing Arts in Prague (DAMU) to formally qualify as an actor.

After first roles as a child film actor, beginning at the age of nine and acting in supporting roles in a few films he gained fame as Čenda in Miloš Forman's Black Peter. His next roles as Filip in Rychman's Starci na chmelu and as Milda in Forman's Loves of a Blonde, with quite some success abroad, together with Hana Brejchová as Andula, turned him, and her, to one of the most famous young actors in Czechoslovakia.

After graduating DAMU in 1965, he joined the newly founded The Drama Club / Činoherní klub in Prague. Jan Kačer, who searched for suitable members for the ensemble, said of the selection of actors: "I wanted them to be people who hated totalitarianism, while full with imagination, creativity, and freedom."

In 1967 at the height of his popularity he decided to emigrate to the United Kingdom to study medicine. He was admitted to study at the University of Sheffield, Medical School thanks to a recommendation letter by the film director Lindsay Anderson. The writer John Le Carré lent him money for tuition. He graduated with a degree in medicine, and with the gold medal, from Sheffield in 1974.

In 1981 he, his wife Rosemary and their young daughter Camilla and son Lindsay (six and four back then), moved to Toronto, Canada, where, after a stopover year in North Bay, Pucholt worked as a paediatrician in Toronto hospital and in his own practice, together with his wife, until their retirement.

He returned to acting only in Vojtěch Jasný's film Return of the Paradise Lost / Návrat ztraceného ráje (1999).

"I have no intention of returning to acting. I did this because Vojtěch's story touched my heart. I wanted to explain something with it."

– Vladimír Pucholt, 1999, in an interview with reflex.cz

He sharply observes the situation, totalitarian heritage, in his first homeland:

"We owe a few people a few slaps and those few slaps didn't fall. We owe justice.
... Decent people voluntarily give up governing in favor of crooks.
... the dirty money that Mr. Klaus said he didn't know about is still here. It's imprinted on the bodies of dirty people. It should have been peeled off, because it didn't belong to them, and given to people who would use it for good things.
... There are a lot of people who had to leave their homelands and look for new homes. If you look at the twentieth century, there is nothing crueler and more deadly in history, because we have much better things to fight about.
... The idea of one of those crooks going to ask for forgiveness still haunts my mind. I can't remember anyone doing that. I don't know anyone like that either. The guilty prefer to say that "mistakes were made" or "those were the times" and many other sayings behind which they hide their personal guilt."

– Vladimír Pucholt, 1999, in an interview with reflex.cz

== Filmography ==
Czechoslovakia

- 1952 Konec strašidel
- 1955 Hastrman (student short film)
- 1955 Návštěva z oblak
- 1955 Punťa a čtyřlístek
- 1955 Vzorný kinematograf Haška Jaroslava
- 1956 Dobrodružství Toma Sawyera (TV)
- 1956 Nezlob, Kristino
- 1957 Brankář bydlí v naší ulici
- 1958 Kasaři
- 1958 O věcech nadpřirozených
- 1960 Žalobníci
- 1961 Malý Bobeš
- 1962 Měšťáci (TV)
- 1962 Oranžový měsíc
- 1962 Pozdní láska (TV)
- 1962 Šestý do party (TV)
- 1963 Černý Petr / Black Peter, director Miloš Forman, as Čenda
- 1963 Kdyby ty muziky nebyly (part of Konkurs), director Miloš Forman
- 1964 Démanty noci / Diamonds of the Night, director Jan Němec, voice Druhý (actor Antonín Kumbera)
- 1964 První den mého syna, director Ladislav Helge, as Žluťásek / Jiří Kouba
- 1964 Starci na chmelu / The Hop Pickers, director Ladislav Rychman, as Filip
- 1964 Konkurs / Audition, director Miloš Forman, as Vláďa (segment Kdyby ty muziky nebyly)
- 1965 Souhvězdí Panny / Constellation of the Virgo, director Zbyněk Brynych, as Veleba
- 1965 Lásky jedné plavovlásky / Loves of a Blonde, director Miloš Forman, as Milda
- 1967 Svatba jako řemen, director Jiří Krejčík, as junior policeman

West Germany

- 1970 Malatesta, director Peter Lilienthal, as Gardstein, German Film Award / Best Supporting Actor 1970

Czech Republic

- 1999 Návrat ztraceného ráje, director Vojtěch Jasný
- 2014 V klidu a naplno, director Josef Abrhám (jun)

=== Theater ===
Činoherní klub – actor in the productions

- 1967 Nikolaj Vasiljevič Gogol: Revizor / The Government Inspector, direction Jan Kačer, as Chlestakov, official from Petersburg
- 1966 Ladislav Smoček: Podivné odpoledne dr. Zvonka Burkeho / Dr. Burke's Strange Afternoon (in one evening with Bludiště / The Maze), direction Ladislav Smoček, as Burke
- 1965 Albert Camus: Spravedliví / The Just, direction Jan Kačer, as Alexej Vojnov
- 1965 Sean O'Casey: Pension pro svobodné pány / Pension for Single Gentlemen, direction Jiří Krejčík, as Halibud
