= Ivan Passer =

Czech film director and screenwriter (1933–2020)

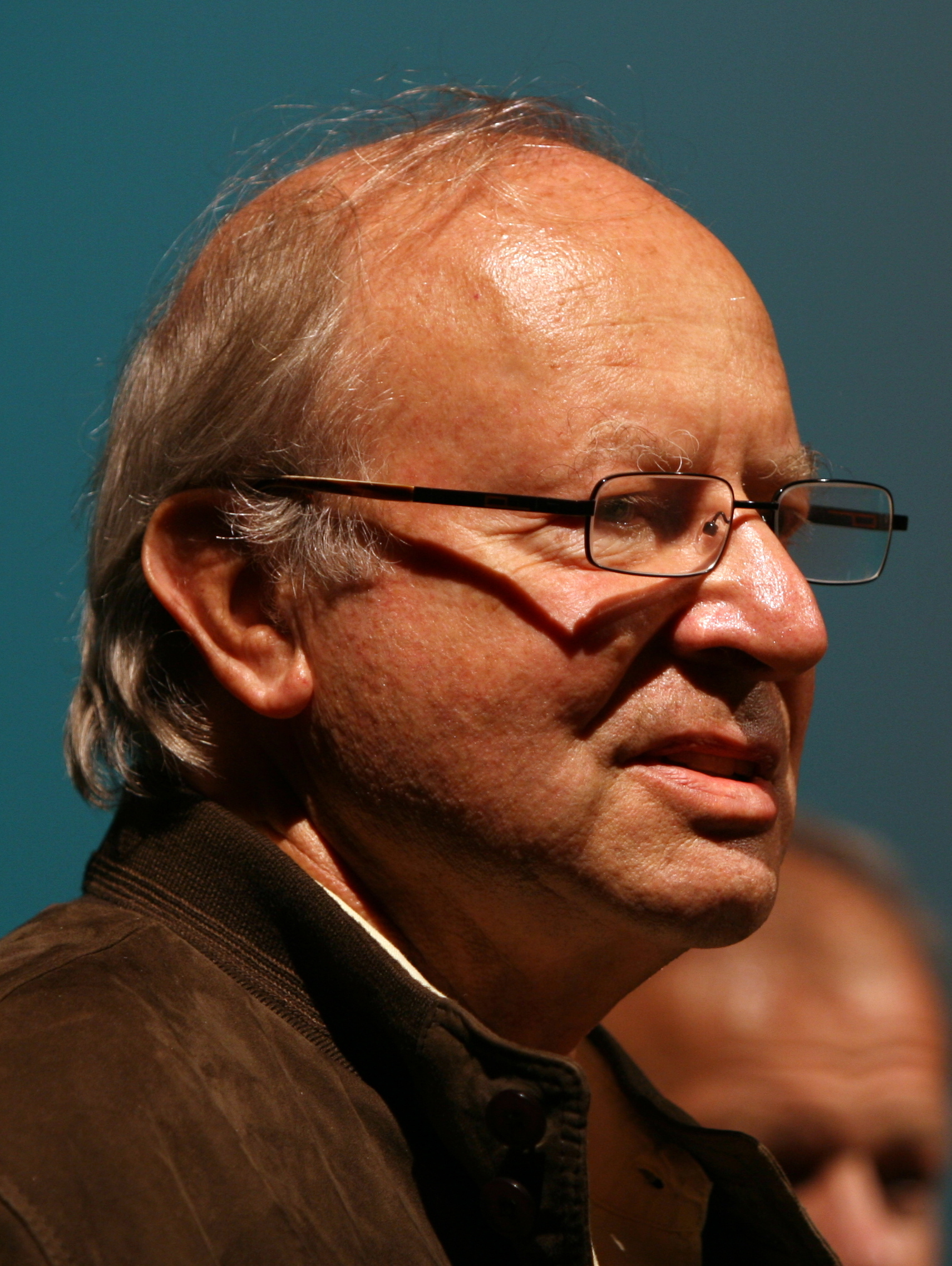
- Ivan Passer at 43rd KVIFF
- Born: July 10, 1933; Prague, Czechoslovakia (now Czech Republic)
- Died: January 9, 2020 (aged 86); Reno, Nevada, U.S.
- Education: Film and TV School of the Academy of Performing Arts in Prague
- Occupations: Film director, screenwriter
- Awards: See below

Ivan Passer (10 July 1933 – 9 January 2020) was a Czech film director and screenwriter. He was best known for his involvement in the Czechoslovak New Wave and for directing American films such as Born to Win (1971), Cutter's Way (1981) and Stalin (1992). He received the Czech Lion Award for Artistic Achievement in 2007.

== Early life and education ==
Passer was born in Prague, the son of Marianna (Mandelick) and Alois Passer. His sister was actress Eva Límanová.

Passer attended King George boarding school in Poděbrady with future filmmakers Miloš Forman, Jerzy Skolimowski and Paul Fierlinger and playwright Václav Havel. He then studied at FAMU in Prague, but did not finish the program.

== Career ==
He began his career as an assistant director on Ladislav Helge's Velká samota. Later he collaborated with his friend Miloš Forman on all of Forman's Czech films, including Loves of a Blonde (1965) and The Firemen's Ball (1967), both of which Passer co-wrote and which were nominated for Academy Awards. He introduced Forman to cinematographer Miroslav Ondříček whom he knew from Velká samota. He then directed his first feature, Intimate Lighting, which was released in 1965 and is considered by some to be Passer's masterpiece.

In 1969, after the Warsaw Pact invasion, Passer and Forman left Czechoslovakia together. Both proceeded to the United States, with Forman becoming an Academy Award-winning filmmaker. Passer went on to make several prominent American films such as Born to Win (1971), a junkie drama starring George Segal and Karen Black, and Cutter's Way (1981), a dramatic thriller starring Jeff Bridges and John Heard.

Though best known for his idiosyncratic, often gritty dramas, he also directed comedies such as Silver Bears (1978) starring Michael Caine and Creator (1985) starring Peter O'Toole. Later in his career, he directed numerous films for television, most notably the award-winning biopic Stalin (1992) starring Robert Duvall for HBO. He was also a film professor at the University of Southern California.

== Personal life ==
Passer was married twice. He married Anne Frances Head in 1992. He had a son, Ivan Jr., from his first marriage.

=== Death ===
Passer died on January 9, 2020, from pulmonary complications in Reno, Nevada. He was 86 years old.

== Filmography ==
=== Film ===
| Year | Title | Functioned as | | Notes |
| Year | Title | Director | Writer | Notes |
|---|---|---|---|---|
| 1966 | A Boring Afternoon | Yes | Yes | Short film; co-writer with Bohumil Hrabal |
| 1965 | Intimate Lighting | Yes | Yes | |
| 1971 | Born to Win | Yes | Yes | |
| 1974 | Law and Disorder | Yes | Yes | Co-writer with Tzvi Fishman and William Richert |
| 1976 | Crime and Passion | Yes | Yes | Co-writer with Alan R. Trustman and David M. Wolf |
| 1977 | Silver Bears | Yes | No | |
| 1981 | Cutter's Way | Yes | No | |
| 1985 | Creator | Yes | No | |
| 1988 | Haunted Summer | Yes | No | |
| 2005 | Nomad: The Warrior | Yes | No | Co-directed with Sergei Bodrov |

==== Writer only ====
| Year | Title | Director | Notes |
|---|---|---|---|
| 1963 | Audition | Miloš Forman | Co-writer with Forman, Jaroslav Papoušek and Václav Šašek |
| 1965 | Loves of a Blonde | Miloš Forman | Co-writer with Forman, Jaroslav Papoušek and Václav Šašek |
| 1967 | The Firemen's Ball | Miloš Forman | Co-writer with Forman, Jaroslav Papoušek and Václav Šašek |

=== Television ===
| Year | Title | Notes |
|---|---|---|
| 1983 | Faerie Tale Theatre | Episode: "The Nightingale" |
| 1990 | Fourth Story | TV movie |
| 1992 | Stalin | TV movie |
| 1994 | While Justice Sleeps | TV movie |
| 1995 | Kidnapped | TV movie |
| 1999 | The Wishing Tree | TV movie |
| 2000 | Picnic | TV movie |

== Awards and nominations ==
| Institution | Year | Category | Work | Result |
|---|---|---|---|---|
| CableACE Awards | 1994 | Movie or Miniseries | Stalin | Nominated |
| CableACE Awards | 1994 | Directing a Movie or Miniseries | Stalin | Nominated |
| Czech Lion Awards | 2007 | Artistic Achievement Award | —N/a | Won |
| Daytime Emmy Awards | 2001 | Outstanding Directing For A Children's Series | The Wishing Tree | Won |
| Karlovy Vary International Film Festival | 2008 | Outstanding Contribution to World Cinema | —N/a | Won |
| Locarno Film Festival | 1966 | Best Short Film | A Boring Afternoon | Won |
| National Society of Film Critics | 1970 | Special Award | Intimate Lighting | Won |
| National Society of Film Critics | 1973 | Richard & Hinda Rosenthal Foundation Award | —N/a | Won |
| Telluride Film Festival | 1978 | Silver Medallion | —N/a | Won |
| Venice Film Festival | 1988 | Golden Lion | Haunted Summer | Nominated |
