= Intimate Lighting =

- Directed by: Ivan Passer
- Written by: Ivan Passer; Jaroslav Papoušek; Václav Šašek
- Starring: Zdeněk Bezušek
- Cinematography: Josef Střecha; Miroslav Ondříček
- Edited by: Jiřina Lukešová
- Production company: Filmové studio Barrandov
- Release date: 8 April 1965
- Running time: 71 minutes
- Country: Czechoslovakia
- Language: Czech

Intimate Lighting (Czech: Intimní osvětlení) is a Czech comedy-drama film directed by Ivan Passer. It was released in 1965. It is widely considered a major film of the Czechoslovak New Wave and to be Passer's most significant film.

== Plot ==
A cello player in an orchestra, Peter, returns to his home village to see a childhood friend, Bambas. Bambas is a local music teacher and performs at funerals. Peter and his fiancee stay with Bambas and his family for the day and get involved in some comic exploits, including a possible symphony concert.

== Cast ==
- Zdeněk Bezušek - Petr
- Karel Blažek - Bambas
- Věra Křesadlová - Štěpa, Petr's girlfriend
- Jaroslava Štědrá - Marie, Karel's wife
- Miroslav Cvrk - Kája, Karel's son
- Dagmar Redinová - Marie, Karel's daughter
- Karel Uhlík - Pharmacist
- Vlastimila Vlková - Grandmother
- Jan Vostrčil - Grandfather

== Production ==
Ivan Passer had previously made a short film, A Boring Afternoon, which took home a prize at the Lorcano International Film Festival, but he had not directed any features when he was approached by his screenwriting friend Jaroslav Papoušek to direct Intimate Lighting. According to Passer, Papoušek needed money but he could not get paid until he found a director who was willing to attach themselves to his script. Papoušek was rejected by everyone he contacted, forcing him to ask Passer for a favor despite his lack of experience. Passer agreed to help his friend, never expecting the film to be actually made. A few months later, he was surprised when he was told to start work on the project even though the studio had openly expressed their reservations about the script.

== Reception ==
Dave Kehr of The Chicago Reader called it "one of the finest works of the short-lived Czech New Wave...Passer has forged something funny and rare: a genuine comedy of melancholy — a gray comedy." Jim Hoberman of The Village Voice wrote that it was "a small masterpiece...less interested in narrative than a state of being, the movie is as subtle in its emotional effects as its title would suggest."
