= Věra Křesadlová =

Czech artist, actress and singer (1944–2025)

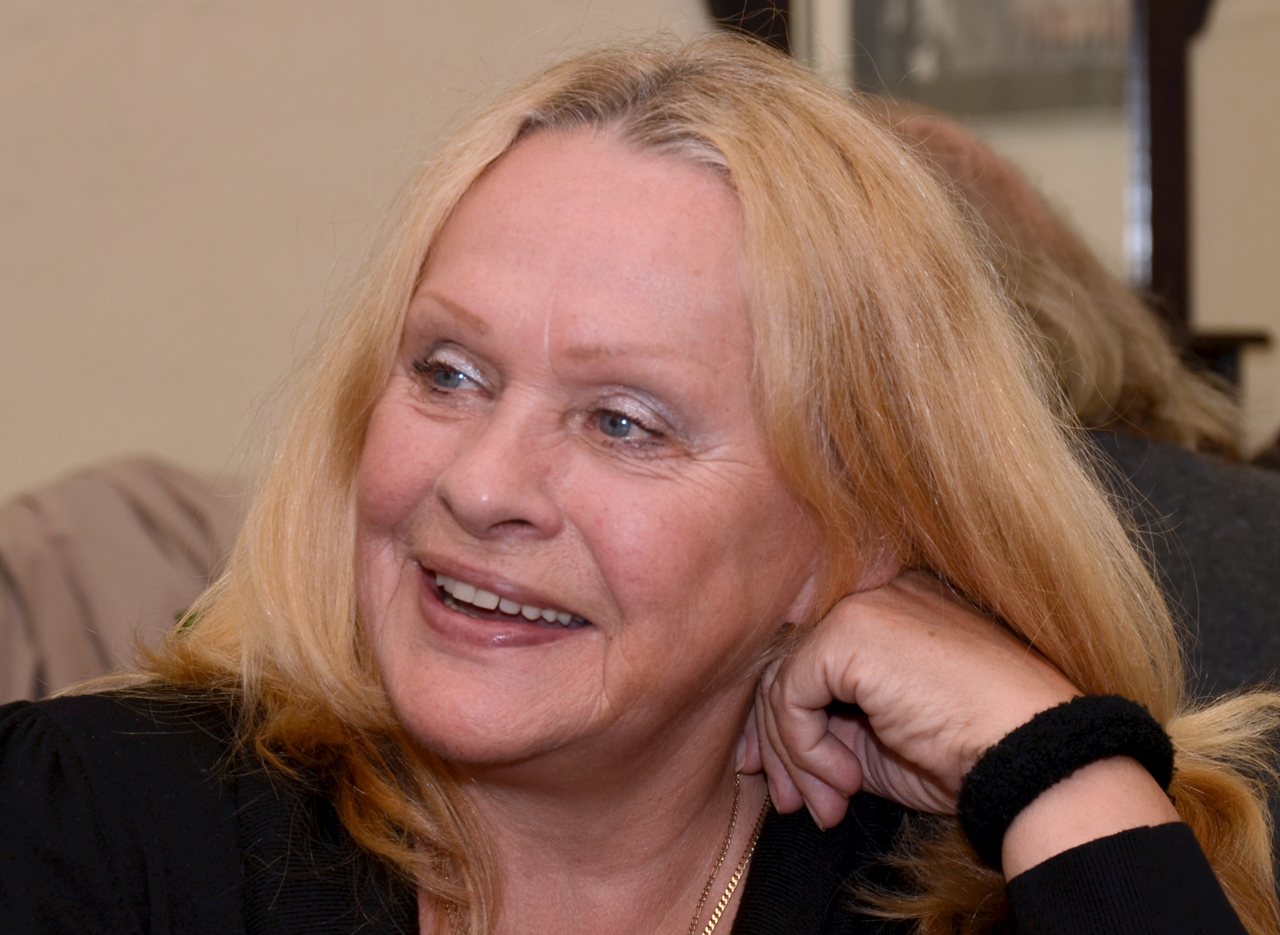
- Křesadlová in 2015
- Born: 28 February 1944; Prague, Protectorate of Bohemia and Moravia
- Died: 5 November 2025 (aged 81); Czech Republic
- Occupations: Artist; actress; singer
- Spouse: Miloš Forman (m. 1964; div. 1999)

Věra Křesadlová (28 February 1944 – 5 November 2025) was a Czech artist, actress and singer.

== Early life and career ==
Křesadlová was born 28 February 1944 in Prague. Throughout her career, she worked on a number of feature films, including Intimate Lighting (1965), Larks on a String (1969), The Joke (1969), and Hrabě Drakula (1971).

== Personal life and death ==
Křesadlová married Miloš Forman, and had twins Petr and Matěj Forman. After Forman relocated to the United States, the pair divorced in 1999 <<-- 1969??. She later lived with screenwriter Jan V. Kratochvíl, with whom she had a son, Radim.

She crafted stained-glass Tiffany-style lamps, a hobby she discovered after visiting Forman in New York in 1969.

Křesadlová died on 5 November 2025, at the age of 81.
