= The Firemen's Ball =

1967 film

- Theatrical release poster
- Hoří, má panenko!
- Directed by: Miloš Forman
- Written by: Miloš Forman; Jaroslav Papoušek; Ivan Passer; Václav Šašek
- Produced by: Rudolf Hájek; Carlo Ponti (uncredited)
- Starring: Jan Vostrčil
- Cinematography: Miroslav Ondříček
- Edited by: Miroslav Hájek
- Music by: Karel Mareš
- Release date: 15 December 1967
- Running time: 73 minutes
- Country: Czechoslovakia
- Language: Czech
- Budget: $65,000

The Firemen's Ball (or Fireman's Ball; Czech: Hoří, Má Panenko: "Fire, My Lady") is a 1967 Czechoslovak New Wave satirical comedy directed by Miloš Forman. It is set at the annual ball of a small town's volunteer fire department, and the plot portrays a series of disasters that occur during the evening. The film uses few professional actors – some characters are played by the firemen of the small town where it was filmed. By portraying the prevailing corruption of the local community and the collapse of even well-intentioned plans, the film satirized the communist system.

The Firemen's Ball was the last film Forman made in his native Czechoslovakia before he relocated to the United States. It is also the first film he shot in color, as well as a milestone of the Czechoslovak New Wave.

== Plot ==
The bumbling volunteer fire department in a small Czechoslovak town organizes a ball in the town hall, including a raffle and a beauty pageant. The firefighters also plan to present a small ceremonial fire axe as a birthday gift to their retired chairman, who has cancer (although they believe he does not know it himself as doctors were forbidden from revealing terminal illnesses to their patients).

During the ball, Josef, one of the firefighters, notices several raffle prizes are missing: a cake, a bottle of cognac, a head cheese, a chocolate ball. He learns that his wife is involved. A bickering committee of firefighters finds eight candidates for the beauty contest, and are bribed by one man to include his homely daughter. The contestants are told the winner will present the gift to the chairman. When the contest begins, the girls flee from the hall and lock themselves in the bathroom. The crowd drags replacement candidates to the stage and a melee ensues until an old woman is crowned the winner.

When an alarm sounds because of a house fire, the guests leave the ball without paying for their drinks. The fire engine gets stuck in the snow, and while the firefighters manage to save some furniture and animals from the burning house of an old man, Mr. Havelka, they're unable to control the fire with shovelsful of snow. One of Havelka's tables is used to sell more alcohol to the crowd watching the fire.

People donate their raffle tickets to help Havelka, who has lost almost everything, but nearly all of the prizes have been stolen, leaving only a few low-value items. At the town hall, the firefighters turn off the lights to give the thieves an opportunity to return the prizes. In the darkness all of the remaining items are also stolen, and when the lights come back on, Josef is caught returning the head cheese his wife stole. The firefighters' committee retreats to discuss how to save the reputation of the department. They return to a now-empty hall, where only their retired chairman remains. The committee presents him a gift box and he gives a heartfelt speech thanking them. The box is opened to reveal the axe has also been stolen.

The next morning, outside in the cold and snow, Havelka lies down in his bed next to the fireman posted to guard the ruins of his home.

== Cast ==
- Jan Vostrčil as Head of Committee
- Josef Šebánek as Committee Member #2
- Josef Valnoha as Committee Member
- František Debelka as Committee Member #1
- Josef Kolb as Josef
- Jan Stöckl as Retired Fire Chief
- Vratislav Čermák as Committee Member
- Josef Řehořek as Committee Member #4
- Václav Novotný as Committee Member
- František Reinstein as Committee Member
- František Paska as Committee Member
- Stanislav Holubec as Karel
- Josef Kutálek as Ludva
- Milada Ježková as Josef's wife

== Background ==
Film poster by Saul Bass

After the success of Loves of a Blonde (1965), Forman, along with fellow screenwriters Ivan Passer and Jaroslav Papoušek, could not concentrate on their follow-up screenplay and so went to the small north Bohemian town of Vrchlabí to hole up in a hotel and write. "One evening, to amuse ourselves, we went to a real firemen's ball," Forman recalled. "What we saw was such a nightmare that we couldn't stop talking about it. So we abandoned what we were writing on to start this script."

The movie was shot in a typical local Palace of Culture, "Na střelnici" in Vrchlabí. Most of the actors were not professional actors (e.g. Josef Šebánek, Milada Ježková). To shoot the natural sound of their voices it was necessary to have silence on-set, so during the actors' dialogue scenes the band merely pretended to play and the dancing couples wore wool socks or slippers. According to Forman, it was Italian film producer Carlo Ponti's $65,000 that enabled the film to be shot in color.

== Controversy ==
Forman has commented on the issue of whether his film should be seen as an allegory of the larger society of the time:

I didn't want to give any special message or allegory. I wanted just to make a comedy knowing that if I'll be real, if I'll be true, the film will automatically reveal an allegorical sense. That's a problem of all governments, of all committees, including firemen's committees. That they try and they pretend and they announce that they are preparing a happy, gay, amusing evening or life for the people. And everybody has the best intentions... But suddenly things turn out in such a catastrophic way that, for me, this is a vision of what's going on today in the world.

The film generated considerable controversy on its release. Among other things, fire companies across Czechoslovakia protested that the film was an attack on their integrity, to the extent that Forman and his team felt obliged to tour the country dispelling this literal reading. The Czechoslovak Communist party members took exception to the film's cynical tone. However, the film became a big hit in Czechoslovak cinemas, selling over 750,000 tickets.

Carlo Ponti, the film's Italian producer, also took umbrage at the film and pulled his financing, leaving Forman to face a possible 10-years' imprisonment for "economic damage to the state". Forman drove from London to Paris to see Claude Lelouch, who had once promised he would buy international rights for any film Forman made, only to find out Lelouch was in Morocco at that time. By chance, Forman met with Claude Berri, who contacted François Truffaut, and after watching the film they both agreed to buy the international rights. Only the intervention of Truffaut saved the film and found it international distribution.

Though the film did have a domestic release, and was shown in Czechoslovak cinemas in the reformist atmosphere of the Prague Spring, the film was subsequently banned after the invasion of Czechoslovakia by Warsaw Pact countries in 1968.

== Reception ==
On the review aggregator website Rotten Tomatoes, 91% of 32 critics' reviews are positive. The website's consensus reads: "The Firemen's Ball is an uproarious comedy of incompetence, mining laughs and sharp satire from an allegory that is amusing and distressing in equal measure."

Roger Ebert wrote, "Telling a seductively mild and humorous story about a retirement fete for an elderly fireman, the movie pokes fun at citizens' committees, the culture of thievery, and solutions that surrender to problems ... Forman is not making fun of his characters, but of the system they inhabit."

== Awards ==
The film was nominated for Best Foreign Language Film at the 41st Academy Awards. It was also listed to compete at the 1968 Cannes Film Festival, but that festival was cancelled due to the events of May 1968 in France.

== Home media ==
Arrow Films released the film on Blu-ray in the UK in 2015.

== See also ==
- List of submissions to the 41st Academy Awards for Best Foreign Language Film
- List of Czechoslovakia submissions for the Academy Award for Best Foreign Language Film
