= Miloš Forman =

Czech and American film director (1932–2018)

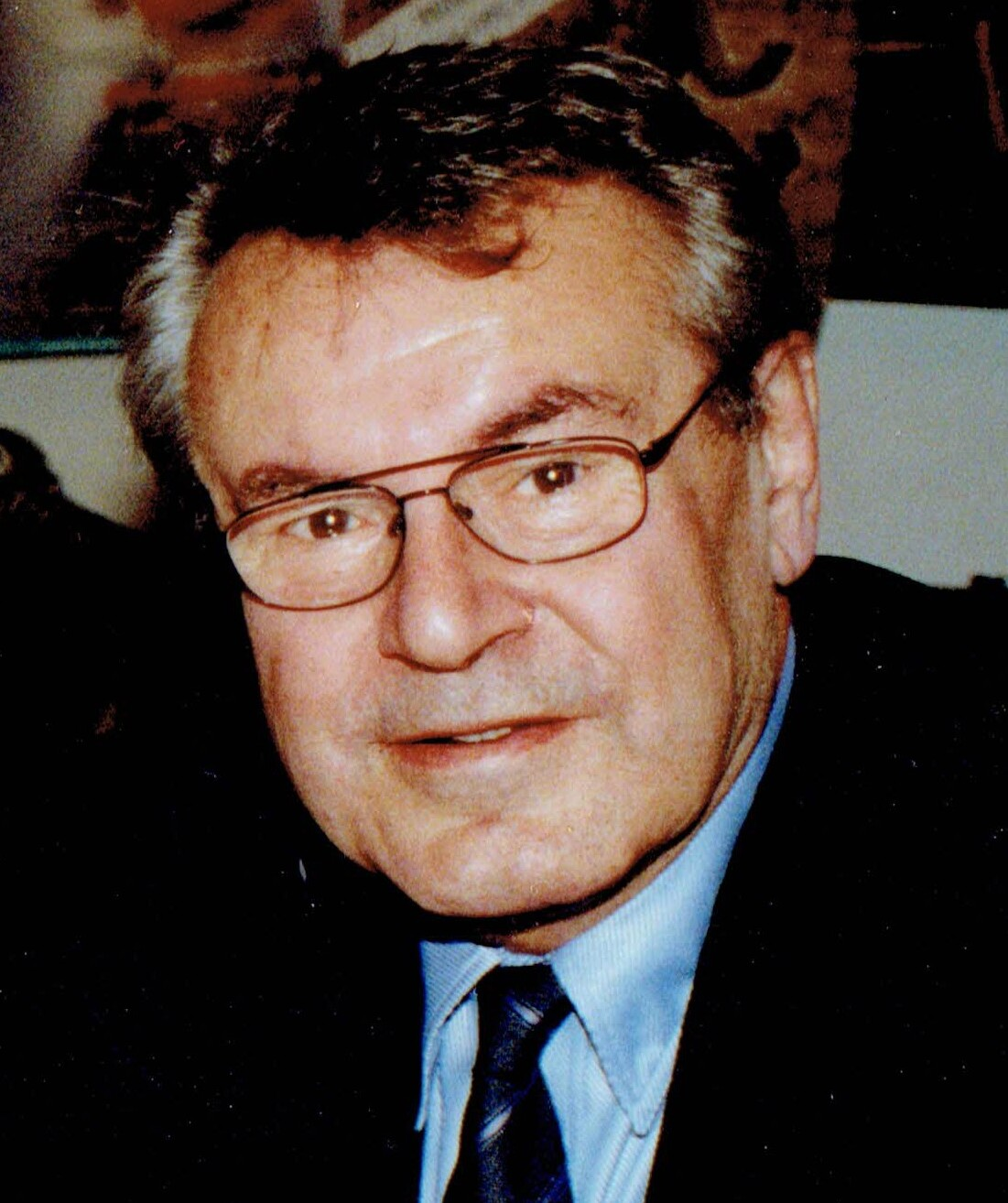
- Forman in 1999
- Born: Jan Tomáš Forman; 18 February 1932; Čáslav, Czechoslovakia
- Died: 13 April 2018 (aged 86); Danbury, Connecticut, US
- Citizenship: Czechoslovakia (until 1993); United States (from 1977); Czech Republic (from 1993)
- Occupations: Actor; director; screenwriter; professor
- Years active: 1953–2011
- Spouses: Jana Brejchová (m. 1958; div. 1962); Věra Křesadlová (m. 1964; div. 1999); Martina Zbořilová (m. 1999)
- Children: 4
- Relatives: Antonie Formanová (granddaughter); Joseph J. Kohn (half-brother)

Jan Tomáš "Miloš" Forman (/ˈmiːloʊʃ/; Czech: [ˈmɪloʃ ˈforman]; 18 February 1932 – 13 April 2018) was a Czech and American film director, screenwriter, actor, and professor. He rose to fame in his native Czechoslovakia before emigrating to the United States in 1968. Over a career spanning six decades, Forman won two Academy Awards, a BAFTA Award, three Golden Globe Awards, a Golden Bear, a César Award, and the Czech Lion.

Forman was an important figure in the Czechoslovak New Wave. Film scholars and Czechoslovak authorities saw his 1967 film The Firemen's Ball as a biting satire on Eastern European Communism. The film was initially shown in theatres in his home country in the more reformist atmosphere of the Prague Spring. However, it was later banned by the Communist government after the invasion by the Warsaw Pact countries in 1968. Forman was subsequently forced to leave Czechoslovakia for the United States, where he continued making films.

He received two Academy Awards for Best Director, one for the psychological drama One Flew Over the Cuckoo's Nest (1975) and one for the biographical drama Amadeus (1984). During this time, he also directed notable and acclaimed films such as Black Peter (1964), Loves of a Blonde (1965), Hair (1979), Ragtime (1981), Valmont (1989), The People vs. Larry Flynt (1996) and Man on the Moon (1999). One Flew Over the Cuckoo's Nest and Amadeus have been inducted into the National Film Registry.

== Early life ==
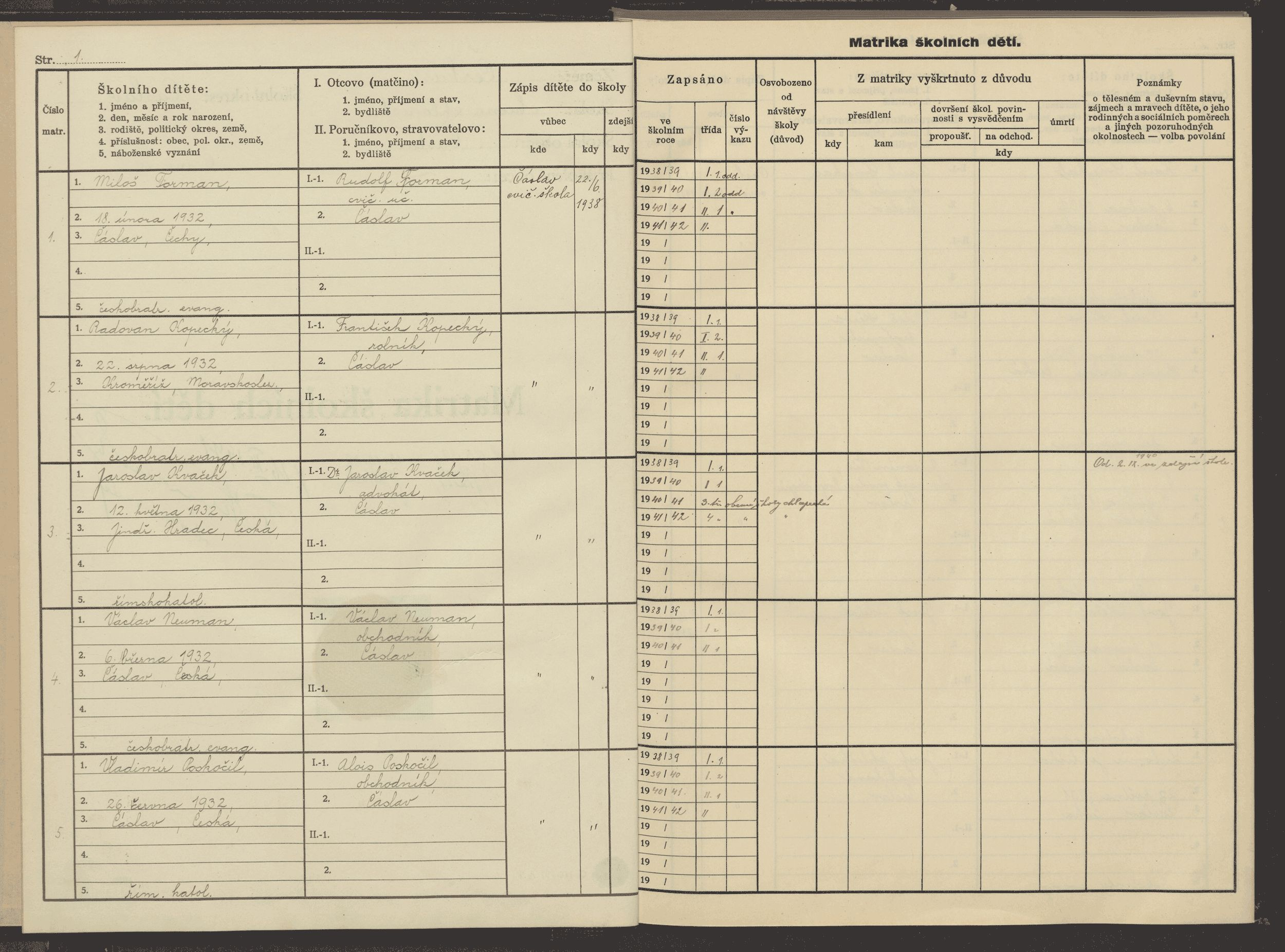
Miloš Forman school register 1941. (SOkA Kutná Hora)

Miloš Forman's childhood was marked by the early loss of his parents. Forman was born in Čáslav, Czechoslovakia (now the Czech Republic) to Anna Švábová Forman, who ran a summer hotel. His parents attended a Protestant church. He believed that his father was Rudolf Forman. During the Nazi occupation, Rudolf, a member of the Czech Resistance, was arrested for distributing banned books, and reportedly died from typhus in Mittelbau-Dora, a subcamp of the Buchenwald concentration camp in May 1944. Another version has it that he died in Mittelbau-Dora during interrogation. Forman's mother had been murdered in Auschwitz in March the previous year. Forman said that he did not fully understand what had happened to them until he saw footage of the concentration camps when he was 16.

Forman was subsequently raised by two uncles and by family friends. His older brother Pavel was a painter twelve years his senior, and he emigrated to Australia after the 1968 invasion of Czechoslovakia. Forman later discovered that his biological father was in fact the Jewish architect Otto Kohn, a survivor of the Holocaust, and Forman was thus a half-brother of mathematician Joseph J. Kohn.

In his youth, Forman wanted to become a theatrical producer. After attending grammar school in Náchod, he went to the King George boarding school in Poděbrady, following the end of the war; fellow students included Václav Havel, the Mašín brothers, and future film-makers Ivan Passer and Jerzy Skolimowski.

He later studied screenwriting at the Academy of Performing Arts in Prague. He was assistant of Alfréd Radok, creator of Laterna Magika. Along with fellow filmmaker and friend Passer, he left Czechoslovakia for the United States during the Warsaw Pact invasion of Czechoslovakia in summer 1968.

== Career ==
Along with cinematographer Miroslav Ondříček and long-time friend from school Ivan Passer, Forman filmed the silent documentary Semafor about the Semafor theater. Forman's first important production was Audition, a documentary about competing singers. He directed several Czech comedies in Czechoslovakia. He was in Paris negotiating the production of his first American film during the Prague Spring in 1968. His employer, a Czech studio, fired him, so he decided to move to the United States. He moved to New York, where he later became a professor of film at Columbia University in 1978 and co-chair (with his former teacher František Daniel) of Columbia's film department. One of his protégés was future director James Mangold, whom he mentored at Columbia. He regularly collaborated with cinematographer Miroslav Ondříček.

=== 1964–1971 ===
Black Peter is one of the first and most representative films of the Czechoslovak New Wave. It won the Golden Leopard award at the Locarno International Film Festival. It covers the first few days in the working life of a Czech teenager. In Czechoslovakia in 1964, the aimless Petr (Ladislav Jakim) starts work as a security guard in a busy self-service supermarket; unfortunately, he is so lacking in confidence that even when he sees shoplifters, he cannot bring himself to confront them. He is similarly tongue-tied with the lovely Asa (Pavla Martínková) and during the lectures about personal responsibility and the dignity of labor that his blustering father (Jan Vostrčil) delivers at home. Loves of a Blonde is one of the best–known movies of the Czechoslovak New Wave, and won awards at the Venice and Locarno film festivals. It was also nominated for the Academy Award for Best Foreign Language Film in 1967.

In 1967, he directed The Firemen's Ball an original Czechoslovak–Italian co-production; this was Forman's first color film. It is one of the best–known movies of the Czechoslovak New Wave. On the face of it a naturalistic representation of an ill-fated social event in a provincial town, the film has been seen by both film scholars and the then-authorities in Czechoslovakia as a biting satire on East European Communism, which resulted in it being banned for many years in Forman's home country. The Czech term zhasnout (to switch lights off), associated with petty theft in the film, was used to describe the large-scale asset stripping that occurred in the country during the 1990s. It was nominated for the Academy Award for Best Foreign Film.

"When Soviet tanks rumbled into Prague in August 1968, Forman was in Paris negotiating for the production of Taking Off (1971), his first American film. Claiming that he was out of the country illegally, his Czech studio fired him, forcing Forman to emigrate to New York"

The first movie Forman made in the United States, Taking Off, shared the Grand Prix (ex aequo)(second prize) with Johnny Got His Gun at the 1971 Cannes Film Festival. The film starred Lynn Carlin and Buck Henry, and also featured, as Jeannie, Linnea Heacock, discovered, with friends, in Washington Square Park. It was critically panned and left Forman struggling to find work. Forman later said that it did so poorly he ended up owing the studio $500.

=== 1975–1989 ===
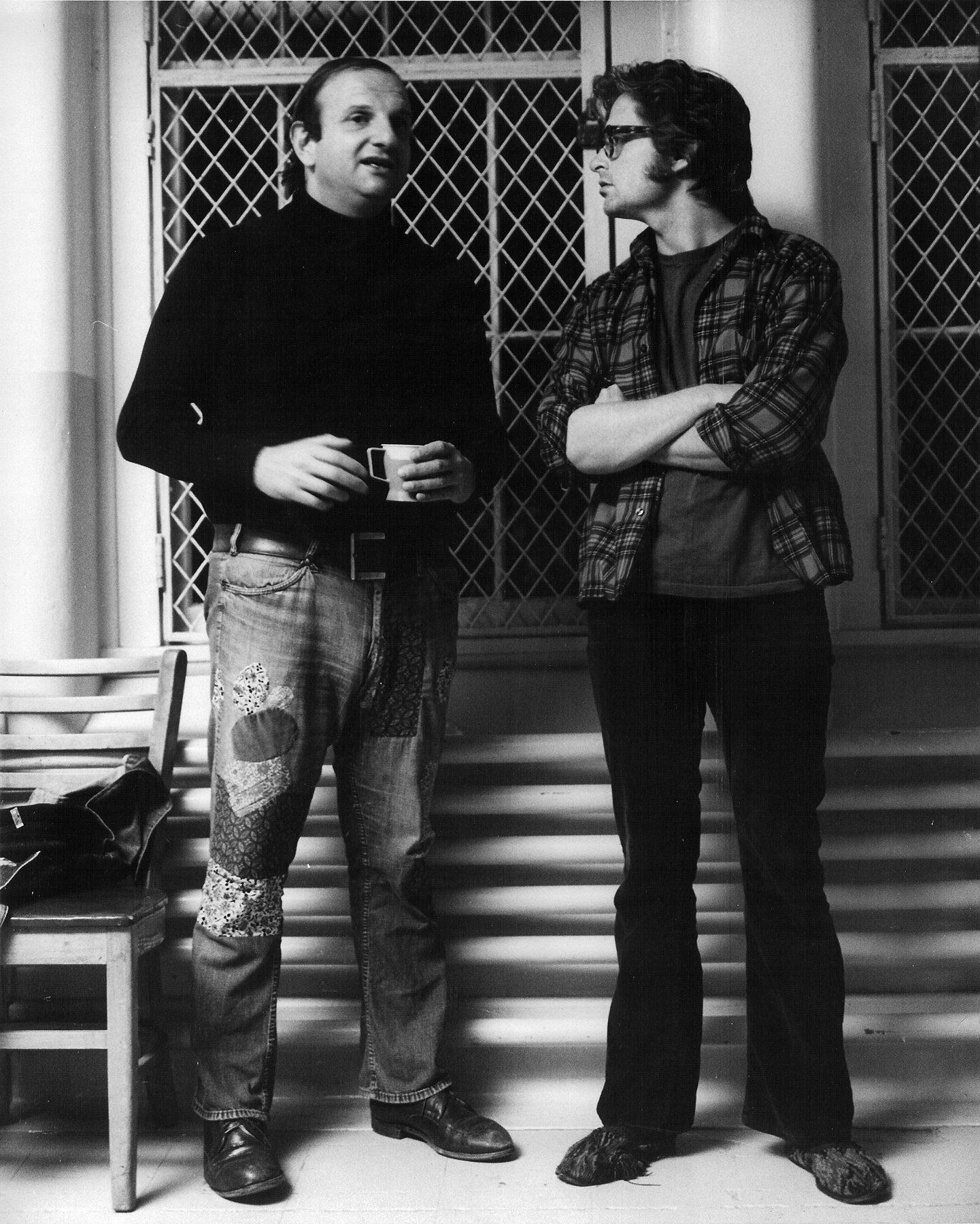
Bo Goldman (left) and Michael Douglas on the set "One Flew Over the Cuckoo's Nest" (1975)

His next film was One Flew Over the Cuckoo's Nest (1975). Despite the failure of Taking Off, producers Michael Douglas and Saul Zaentz hired him to direct the adaptation of Ken Kesey's cult novel One Flew Over the Cuckoo's Nest. Forman later said they hired him because he was in their price range. Starring Jack Nicholson and Louise Fletcher, the adaptation was a critical and commercial success. The film won Oscars in the five most important categories: Best Director, Best Actor, Best Actress, Best Picture and Best Adapted Screenplay. One of only three films in history to do so (alongside It Happened One Night and The Silence of the Lambs), it firmly established Forman's reputation.

Arthur Knight, film critic of The Hollywood Reporter declared in his review, "With One Flew Over the Cuckoo’s Nest, Forman takes his rightful place as one of our most creative young directors. His casting is inspired, his sense of milieu is assured, and he could probably wring Academy Award performances from a stone." The success of One Flew Over the Cuckoo's Nest allowed Forman to direct his long-planned film version of Hair in 1979, a rock musical based on the Broadway musical by James Rado, Gerome Ragni and Galt MacDermot. The film starred Treat Williams, John Savage and Beverly D'Angelo. It was disowned by the writers of the original musical, and, although it received positive reviews, it did not do well financially.

In 1981, he directed Ragtime, the American drama based on the 1975 historical novel Ragtime by E.L. Doctorow. Forman's next important achievement was Amadeus (1984), an adaptation of Peter Shaffer's play of the same name. Retelling the story of Wolfgang Amadeus Mozart and Antonio Salieri, it starred Tom Hulce, Elizabeth Berridge and F. Murray Abraham. The film was internationally acclaimed and won eight Oscars, including Best Picture, Best Director and Best Actor (for Abraham). Chicago Sun-Times film critic Roger Ebert praised the film, writing: "Amadeus is a magnificent film, full and tender and funny and charming -- and, at the end, sad and angry, too, because in the character of Salieri it has given us a way to understand not only greatness, but our own lack of it".

Forman's adaptation, Valmont (1989) of Pierre Choderlos de Laclos's novel Les Liaisons dangereuses had its premiere on 17 November 1989. Another film adaptation by Stephen Frears from the same source material had been released the previous year, and overshadowed Forman's adaptation. The film starred Colin Firth, Meg Tilly and Annette Bening. The film received mixed reviews with critic of the Los Angeles Times Sheila Benson, praising its gorgeous costumes, but noting its inferior quality to Dangerous Liaisons. She wrote: "Valmont is gorgeous, and for a while you can coast on its costumes and production details....But to consider Valmont in the light of Baudelaire’s words on Les Liaisons Dangereuses--”This book, if it burns, must burn like ice”—is to see just how far down this ice has been watered."

=== 1996–2006 ===
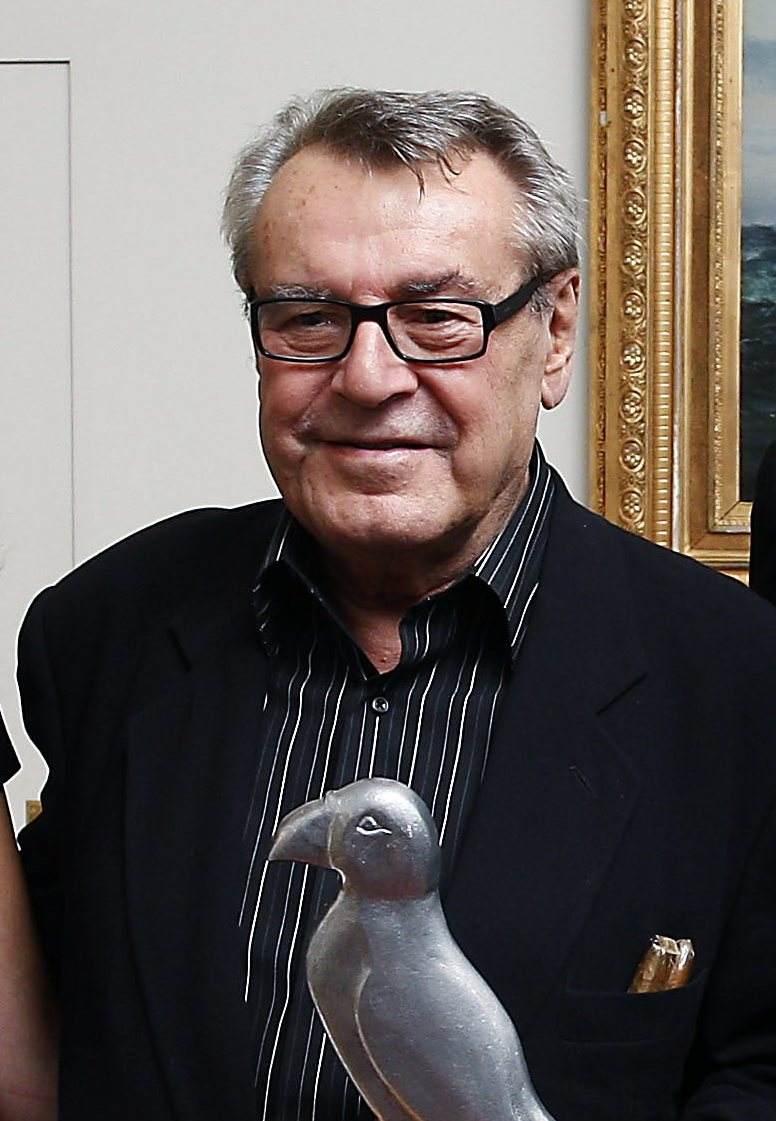
Forman in 2009

The 1996 biographical film The People vs. Larry Flynt was a portrayal of pornography mogul Larry Flynt who brought Forman another directing Oscar nomination. The film starred Woody Harrelson, Courtney Love, and Edward Norton. Though critically acclaimed, it grossed only $20 million at the box office. The biography, Man on the Moon (1999) was of famous actor and avant-garde comic Andy Kaufman (Jim Carrey, who won a Golden Globe for his performance) premiered on 22 December 1999. The film also starred Danny DeVito, Courtney Love, and Paul Giamatti. Several actors from One Flew Over the Cuckoo's Nest appeared in the film, including DeVito. In 2000, Forman performed alongside actor Edward Norton in Norton's directorial debut, Keeping the Faith (2000), as the wise friend to Norton's conflicted priest.

Forman returned to directing with Goya's Ghosts, which premiered on 8 November 2006. It was a biography of the Spanish painter Francisco Goya, and an American-Spanish co-production. This was Forman's last film. It starred Natalie Portman, Javier Bardem, Stellan Skarsgård and Randy Quaid and struggled at the box office. The film received mixed reviews with Phillip French of The Guardian lauding it writing "This is a most engaging, thoughtful, beautifully mounted film". However, Kirk Honeycut from The Hollywood Reporter wrote, "In general, the filmmakers failed to make several basic decisions before shooting...[the] Below-the-line credits are terrific, which only increases an overwhelming sense of disappointment with the film's failed ambitions."

=== Unfinished projects ===
In the late 1950s, Forman and Josef Škvorecký started adapting Škvorecký's short story Eine kleine Jazzmusik for the screen. The script, named Kapela to vyhrála (The Band Won It), tells the story of a student jazz band during the Nazi Occupation of Czechoslovakia. The script was submitted to Barrandov Film Studios. The studio required changes and both artists continued to rewrite the script. Right before the film started shooting, the whole project was completely scrapped, most probably due to intervention from people at the top of the political scene, as Škvorecký had just published his novel The Cowards, which was strongly criticized by communist politicians. The story Eine kleine Jazzmusik was dramatized as a TV film in the 1990s. In the spring and summer of 1968, Škvorecký and Forman cooperated again by jointly writing a script synopsis to make a film version of The Cowards. After Škvorecký fled the Warsaw Pact invasion, the synopsis was translated into English, but no film was made.

In the mid-1960s, Forman, Passer and Papoušek were working on a script about a soldier secretly living in Lucerna Palace in Prague. They got stuck writing the script and went to a village firemen's ball. Inspired by the experience, they decided to cancel the script and write The Firemen's Ball instead.

In early 1970s, Forman worked on a script with Thomas Berger based on his novel Vital Parts.

In 1989, Forman was asked to direct Ghost for Paramount and pitched directing the film to screenwriter Bruce Joel Rubin. However, he was dismissed from the film when both Rubin and Paramount disliked his ideas for the film.

In the early 1990s, Forman co-wrote a screenplay with Adam Davidson. The screenplay, titled Hell Camp, was about an American-Japanese love affair in the world of sumo wrestlers. The picture was to be funded by TriStar Pictures, and was cancelled just four days before shooting because of the disapproval of the Japan Sumo Association, while Forman refused to make the changes requested by the association.

Forman was hand-picked by writer/producer Michael Crichton to direct Disclosure (1994), but subsequently left the project over creative differences with Crichton.

In 1995, it was announced that Forman would direct a remake of Dodsworth (1936) for Warner Bros. starring Harrison Ford, from a script by Alfred Uhry. It was postponed however, following an injury of Forman's.

After completing The People vs. Larry Flynt, Forman was perusing other projects while Man on the Moon was being written and said to be contemplating the screen version of Master Class. Based on the play by Terrence McNally, the project had Faye Dunaway attached. However, Forman's agent told Variety that he wouldn't be taking it on if rumors of a lawsuit emerged, or if he were obligated to use certain stars.

In January 1997, Forman agreed to make Universal's The Little Black Book as his next film, expecting to shoot in the fall. It was an adaptation of the French play by Jean-Claude Carrière. Later that same month, he reportedly was reading the script for, and considering directing, the Arnold Schwarzenegger vehicle With Wings as Eagles. Forman was the star's preferred choice to take on the helm of the project, which was set up at Paramount, under Alan Ladd Jr.

Around 2000, Forman was in talks to direct a film about the early life of Howard Hughes with screenplay by Scott Alexander and Larry Karaszewski, and Edward Norton in the role of the eccentric young billionaire.

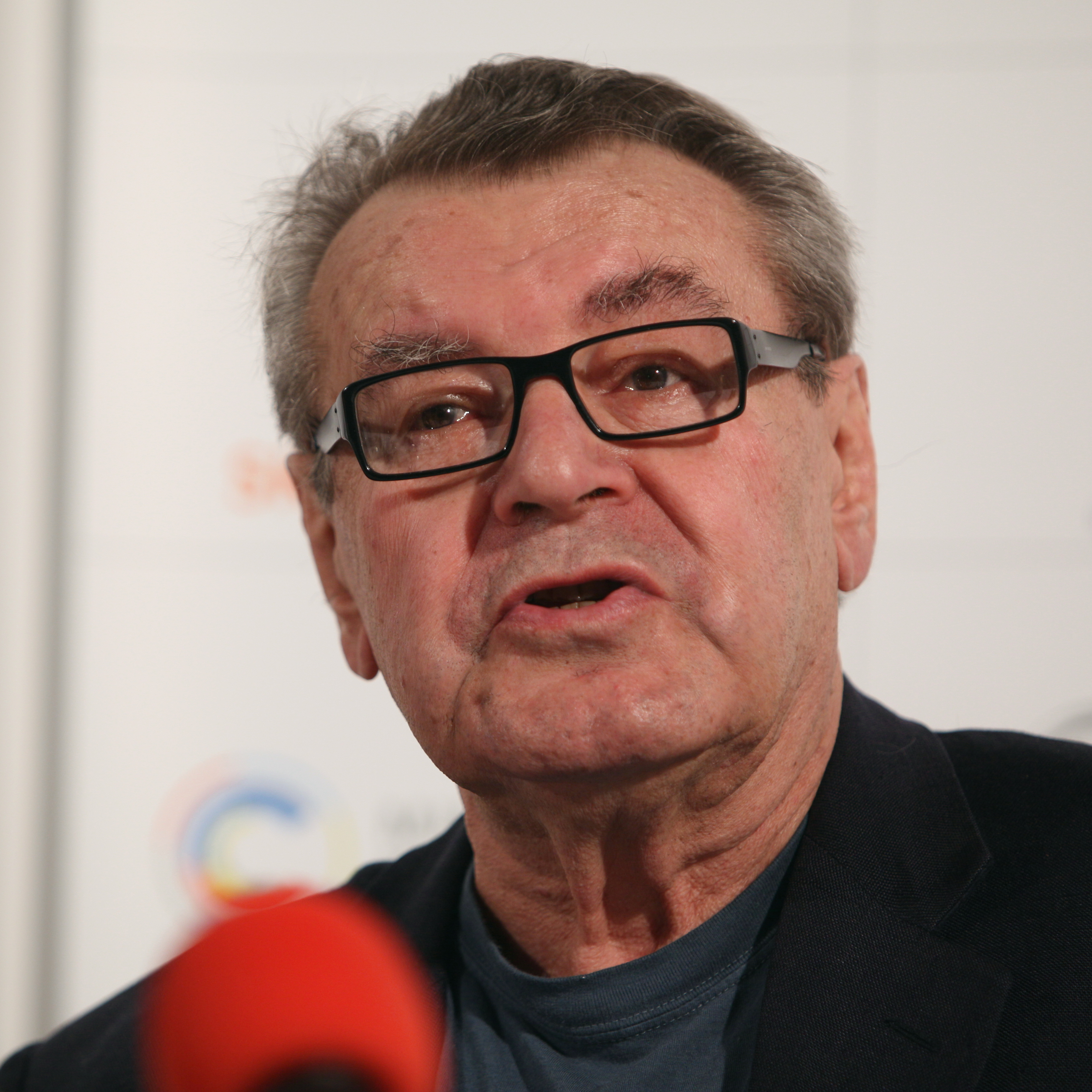
Forman in 2009

Around 2001, Forman was set to direct and co-write the comic crime caper Bad News, adapted from the novel by Donald E. Westlake. Forman was co-writing the script with Doug Wright. The project never came to fruition.

In the early 2000s, Forman developed a film project to be titled Embers, adapted by Jean-Claude Carrière from Hungarian novelist Sándor Márai's novel. The film was about two men in the former Austria-Hungary Empire from different social backgrounds who become friends in military school and meet again 41 years later. Forman cast Sean Connery and Klaus Maria Brandauer as well as Winona Ryder. Several months before shooting, Sean Connery and the Italian producer had a disagreement, and Connery withdrew from the project. Forman was so convinced that Sean Connery fit the role that he didn't want to shoot the film without him and cancelled the project a few days before the shooting was due to start.

In the late 2000s, the screenplay for Ghost of Munich was written by Forman, Jean-Claude Carriere and Václav Havel (the former Czech president and writer, who had studied at school with Forman), inspired by the novel by the French novelist Georges-Marc Benamou. The story takes a closer look at the events that surrounded the Munich Agreement. The role of the French Prime Minister Édouard Daladier was supposed to have been played by the French actor Mathieu Amalric, with his older self played by Gérard Depardieu. However, the production company Pathé was not able to fund the project.

In 2011, Forman was reportedly in negotiations to direct a screen adaptation of Mitchell Zuckoff's acclaimed biography, Ponzi's Scheme: The True Story of a Financial Legend, with Christopher Weekes penning the script.

== Personal life and death ==
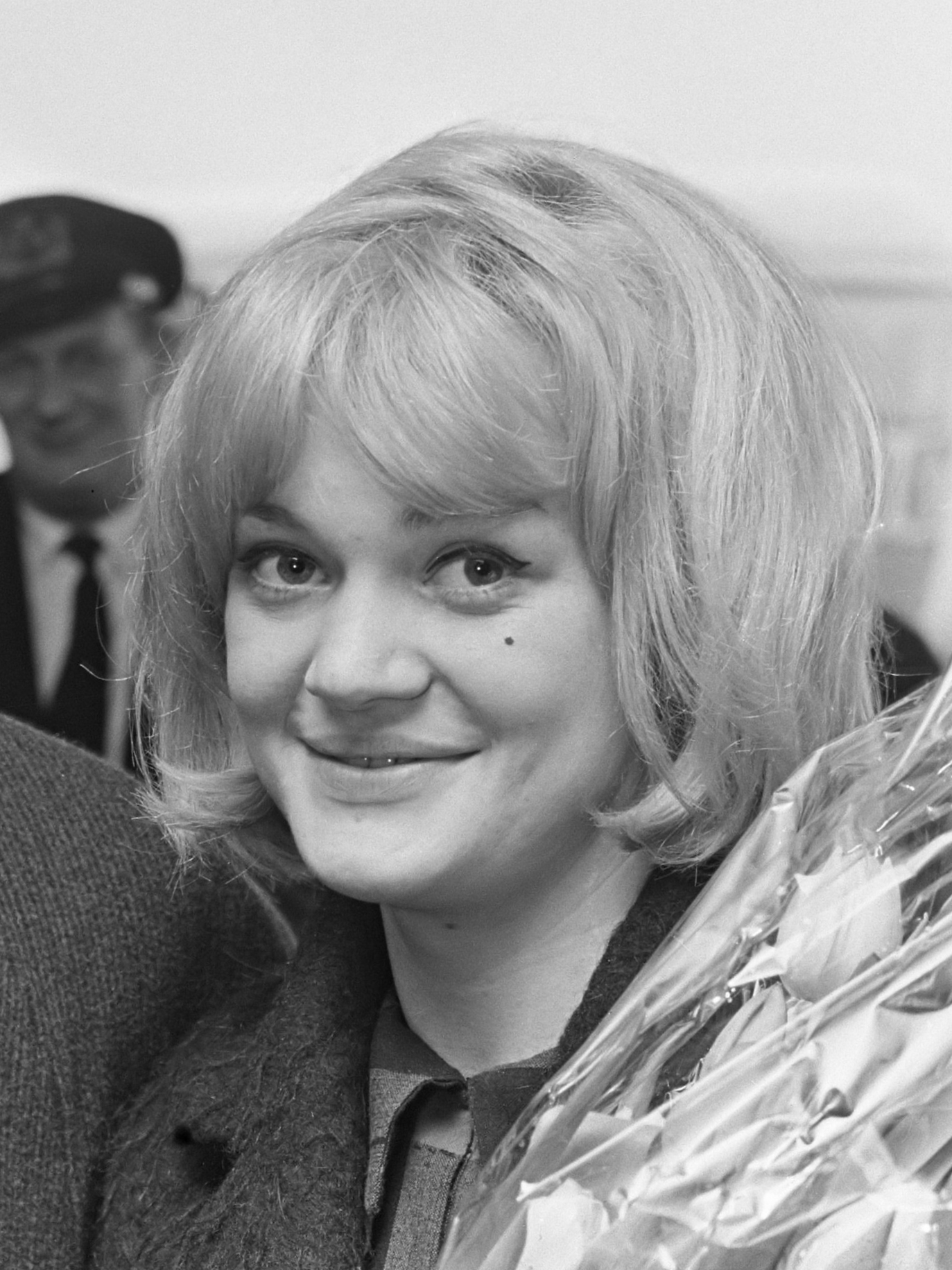
Forman gave his 18-year-old sister-in-law Hana Brejchová her first film role in Loves of a Blonde, which earned her third place in the Best Actress category at the Venice Film Festival.

Forman's first wife was Czech movie star Jana Brejchová. They met while making Štěňata (1957). They divorced in 1962. Forman had twin sons with his second wife Czech actress and singer Věra Křesadlová. They separated in 1969. Their sons Petr and Matěj (b. 1964) are both involved in the theatre. Forman married Martina Zbořilová on 28 November 1999, and they also had twin sons Jim and Andy (born 1999).

Forman was professor emeritus of film at Columbia University. In 1996, asteroid 11333 Forman was named after him. He wrote poems and published the autobiography Turnaround in 1994.

After a short illness, he died at Danbury Hospital near his home in Warren, Connecticut on 13 April 2018 at age 86. He is interred at New Warren Cemetery in Warren, Connecticut.

== Work ==
=== Film ===
Year	English title	Director	Writer	Original title
1964	Black Peter	Yes	Yes	Černý Petr
1965	Loves of a Blonde	Yes	Yes	Lásky jedné plavovlásky
1967	The Firemen's Ball	Yes	Yes	Hoří, má panenko
1971	Taking Off	Yes	Yes	
1975	One Flew Over the Cuckoo's Nest	Yes	No	
1979	Hair	Yes	No	
1981	Ragtime	Yes	No	
1984	Amadeus	Yes	No	
1989	Valmont	Yes	Yes	
1996	The People vs. Larry Flynt	Yes	No	
1999	Man on the Moon	Yes	No	
2006	Goya's Ghosts	Yes	Yes	

Documentary film

Year	English title	Director	Writer	Original title
1960	Magic Lantern II	Yes	Yes	
1964	If Only They Ain't Had Them Bands	Yes	Yes	Kdyby ty muziky nebyly
1964	Audition	Yes	Yes	Konkurs
1973	Visions of Eight	Yes	No	Segment "The Decathlon"

Short film

- I Miss Sonia Henie (1971)

Acting credits

Year	Title	Role
1953	Slovo dělá ženu (A Woman as Good as Her Word)	Young Worker
1954	Stříbrný vítr (Silver wind)	dustojník u Stanku
1986	Heartburn	Dmitri
1989	New Year's Day	Lazlo
2000	Keeping the Faith	Father Havel
2008	Chelsea on the Rocks	Himself
2009	Peklo s princeznou (Hell with a Princess)	Erlebub
2011	Beloved (Les Bien-aimés)	Jaromil

=== Television ===
Year	English title	Original title
1966	A well paid walk	Dobře placená procházka

=== Theatre ===
Year	Title	Director	Writer
1958	Laterna magika	No	Yes
1960	Laterna magika II	No	Yes
1972	The Little Black Book	Yes	No
2007	A Walk Worthwhile	Yes	No

== Honours and legacy ==
In 1977, he became a naturalized citizen of the United States. In 1985, he headed the Cannes Film Festival and in 2000 did the same for the Venice Film Festival. He presided over a César Award ceremony in 1988. In April 2007, he took part in the jazz opera Dobře placená procházka, itself a remake of the TV film he made in 1966. It premiered at the Prague National Theatre, directed by Forman's son, Petr Forman. Named 30th greatest Czech by Největší Čech Forman's films One Flew Over the Cuckoo's Nest and Amadeus were selected for the National Film Registry as being "culturally, historically, or aesthetically significant" in 1993 and 2019 respectively

- 1965: Awarded the state prize of Klement Gottwald for Loves of a Blonde
- 1997: The Crystal Globe award for outstanding artistic contribution to world cinema at the Karlovy Vary International Film Festival.
- 1998: Awarded a lifetime Achievement award by the Czech Lion Awards for his contributions to Czech cinema
- 1995: Awarded Czech Medal of Merit
- 2006: Awarded the Hanno R. Ellenbogen Citizenship Award
- 2009: Forman received an honorary degree from Emerson College in Boston, Massachusetts, US.
- 2015: Awarded honorary Doctor of humane letters degree by Columbia University
- 2026: Awarded Czech Order of the White Lion III. class, in memoriam

=== Awards and nominations ===
Throughout Forman's career he won two Academy Awards, three Golden Globe Awards, Grand Prix at the Cannes Film Festival, Golden Bear at the Berlin Film Festival, a BAFTA Award, a César Award, and the Czech Lion.

Year	Award	Category	Title	Result	Ref.
1967	Academy Awards	Best Foreign Language Film	Loves of a Blonde (representing Czechoslovakia)	Nominated	
1969	Academy Awards	Best Foreign Language Film	The Firemen's Ball (representing Czechoslovakia)	Nominated	
1976	Academy Awards	Best Director	One Flew Over the Cuckoo's Nest	Won	
1985	Academy Awards	Best Director	Amadeus	Won	
1997	Academy Awards	Best Director	The People vs. Larry Flynt	Nominated	
1972	British Academy Film Awards	Best Direction	Taking Off	Nominated	
1972	British Academy Film Awards	Best Film	Taking Off	Nominated	
1972	British Academy Film Awards	Best Screenplay	Taking Off	Nominated	
1977	British Academy Film Awards	Best Direction	One Flew Over the Cuckoo's Nest	Won	
1986	British Academy Film Awards	Best Film	Amadeus	Nominated	
1976	Golden Globe Awards	Best Director	One Flew Over the Cuckoo's Nest	Won	
1982	Golden Globe Awards	Best Director	Ragtime	Nominated	
1985	Golden Globe Awards	Best Director	Amadeus	Won	
1997	Golden Globe Awards	Best Director	The People vs. Larry Flynt	Won	
1971	Cannes Film Festival	Grand Prix	Taking Off	Won	
1971	Cannes Film Festival	Palme d'Or	Taking Off	Nominated	
1997	Berlin International Film Festival	Golden Berlin Bear	The People vs. Larry Flynt	Won	
2000	Berlin International Film Festival	Golden Berlin Bear	Man on the Moon	Nominated	
2000	Berlin International Film Festival	Silver Bear for Best Director	Man on the Moon	Won	
1977	César Awards	Best Foreign Film	One Flew Over the Cuckoo's Nest	Nominated	
1980	César Awards	Best Foreign Film	Hair	Nominated	
1985	César Awards	Best Foreign Film	Amadeus	Won	
1990	César Awards	Best Director	Valmont	Nominated	
1976	David di Donatello Awards	Best Foreign Director	One Flew Over the Cuckoo's Nest	Won	
1980	David di Donatello Awards	Best Foreign Director	Hair	Won	
1985	David di Donatello Awards	Best Foreign Director	Amadeus	Won	
1985	David di Donatello Awards	Best Foreign Film	Amadeus	Won	

Awards and nominations received by Forman's films
Year	Title	Academy Awards		BAFTA Awards		Golden Globe Awards	
Year	Title	Nominations	Wins	Nominations	Wins	Nominations	Wins
1965	Loves of a Blonde	1				1	
1967	The Firemen's Ball	1					
1971	Taking Off			6			
1973	Visions of Eight					1	1
1975	One Flew Over the Cuckoo's Nest	9	5	10	6	6	6
1979	Hair					2	
1981	Ragtime	8		1		7	
1984	Amadeus	11	8	9	4	6	4
1989	Valmont	1		1			
1996	The People vs. Larry Flynt	2				5	2
1999	Man on the Moon					2	1
Total		33	13	27	10	30	14

Directed Academy Award performances
Under Forman's direction, these actors have received Academy Award nominations (and wins) for their performances in their respective roles.

Year	Performer	Film	Result
Academy Award for Best Actor
1975	Jack Nicholson	One Flew Over the Cuckoo's Nest	Won
1984	F. Murray Abraham	Amadeus	Won
1984	Tom Hulce	Amadeus	Nominated
1996	Woody Harrelson	People vs. Larry Flynt	Nominated
Academy Award for Best Supporting Actor
1975	Brad Dourif	One Flew Over the Cuckoo's Nest	Nominated
1981	Howard E. Rollins Jr.	Ragtime	Nominated
Academy Award for Best Actress
1975	Louise Fletcher	One Flew Over the Cuckoo's Nest	Won
Academy Award for Best Supporting Actress
1981	Elizabeth McGovern	Ragtime	Nominated

== See also ==
- List of Big Five Academy Award winners and nominees
- List of Czech Academy Award winners and nominees

== Bibliography ==
- The Milos Forman Stories von Antonin J. Liehm ISBN 9781138658295
