= Loves of a Blonde =

- Directed by: Miloš Forman
- Written by: Miloš Forman; Jaroslav Papoušek; Ivan Passer; Václav Šašek
- Produced by: Doro Vlado Hreljanović; Rudolf Hájek
- Starring: Hana Brejchová; Vladimír Pucholt; Vladimír Menšík
- Cinematography: Miroslav Ondříček
- Edited by: Miroslav Hájek
- Music by: Evžen Illín
- Release dates: August 1965 (Venice Film Festival); November 12, 1965
- Running time: 90 minutes
- Country: Czechoslovakia
- Language: Czech

Loves of a Blonde (Czech: Lásky jedné plavovlásky), also known as A Blonde in Love, is a 1965 Czechoslovak romantic comedy-drama film directed by Miloš Forman that follows a young woman, Andula, who has a routine job in a shoe factory in provincial Czechoslovakia, and her attempts at forging a romantic relationship.

Forman based his story on an incident from his past and the filmmakers created a realistic look and feel by filming on location in a small Czech town with a shoe factory, utilizing a largely non-professional cast, relying on a considerable amount of dialogue improvisation, and employing documentary-style cinematographic techniques.

Upon its release, Loves of a Blonde was popular in its home country and was shown at some major film festivals, where it garnered a number of nominations and awards. Critical response was largely positive, although some reviewers were less enthusiastic than others. The film is now considered one of the most significant examples of the Czech New Wave, a movement which took advantage of a temporary relaxation of totalitarian control over creative artists to use cinema as a means to explore new narrative strategies while making pointed critiques of social and political conditions behind the Iron Curtain. Loves of a Blonde was nominated for the 1966 Academy Award for Best Foreign Language Film.

== Plot ==
Andula, a working-class young woman, lives in a fading Czech factory town where women outnumber men 16–1. One night, she and a fellow shoe-factory-worker friend lie in bed in their dormitory, discussing the ring given to Andula by her boyfriend Tonda and gossiping about her flirtatious encounter with a forest ranger.

Realizing that the gender disparity is impairing morale and productivity, the factory supervisor arranges for an army officer to organize military maneuvers near the town. The factory will sponsor a dance, at which the workers can find male companionship among the soldiery. Anticipation runs high on both sides, with the girls expecting to meet young men, while the recruits, many of whom are actually middle-aged reservists, out-of-shape and already married, look forward to a night of seduction.

The night of the party is a disappointment for some members of both groups; Andula and her friends are repulsed by the soldiers, whom they call "old buffers," and three reservists are so nonplussed by the situation that they commit various faux pas, like sending a bottle of wine to the wrong table and dropping a wedding ring that one of them is trying to hide, only to watch it roll across the floor and land at the feet of the women who had received the bottle. For these people, the mixer is a flop, with the girls retiring to the lavatory to devise a way to escape their pursuers and the reservists arguing with each other over expenses and speculating on the necessity of going to the woods to have sex. For others, however, the dance is a success.

Andula strikes up a flirtation with Milda, the pianist of the band providing the music. He reads her palm and instructs her in how to rebuff unwanted advances with a kick in the shins. After the party, she has sex with Milda.

Although Andula hears nothing from Milda after their night together, she still expects to reunite with him shortly, so she breaks off with Tonda, who storms the dormitory demanding his ring back. After listening to a speech by the housemother on the virtues of fidelity and commitment, she packs up her suitcase and arrives on Milda's doorstep in the big city, ready to resume their romance. Milda is not home, and she meets his parents, who have never heard of Andula and do not know what to do with her. Milda comes home late, and after an evening of tension and uncertainty, it is decided to put her up for the night on the sofa, requiring Milda to climb into bed with his parents to avoid any appearance of impropriety. Andula, kneeling outside the door of their bedroom, overhears the family squabbling. When it becomes clear to her that she is not valued in the least, Andula starts crying and, the next morning, returns to her home. She tells her friends about her "wonderful" trip to the capital and how nice Milda's parents were to her, especially his father, and later returns to work at the factory.

== Cast ==
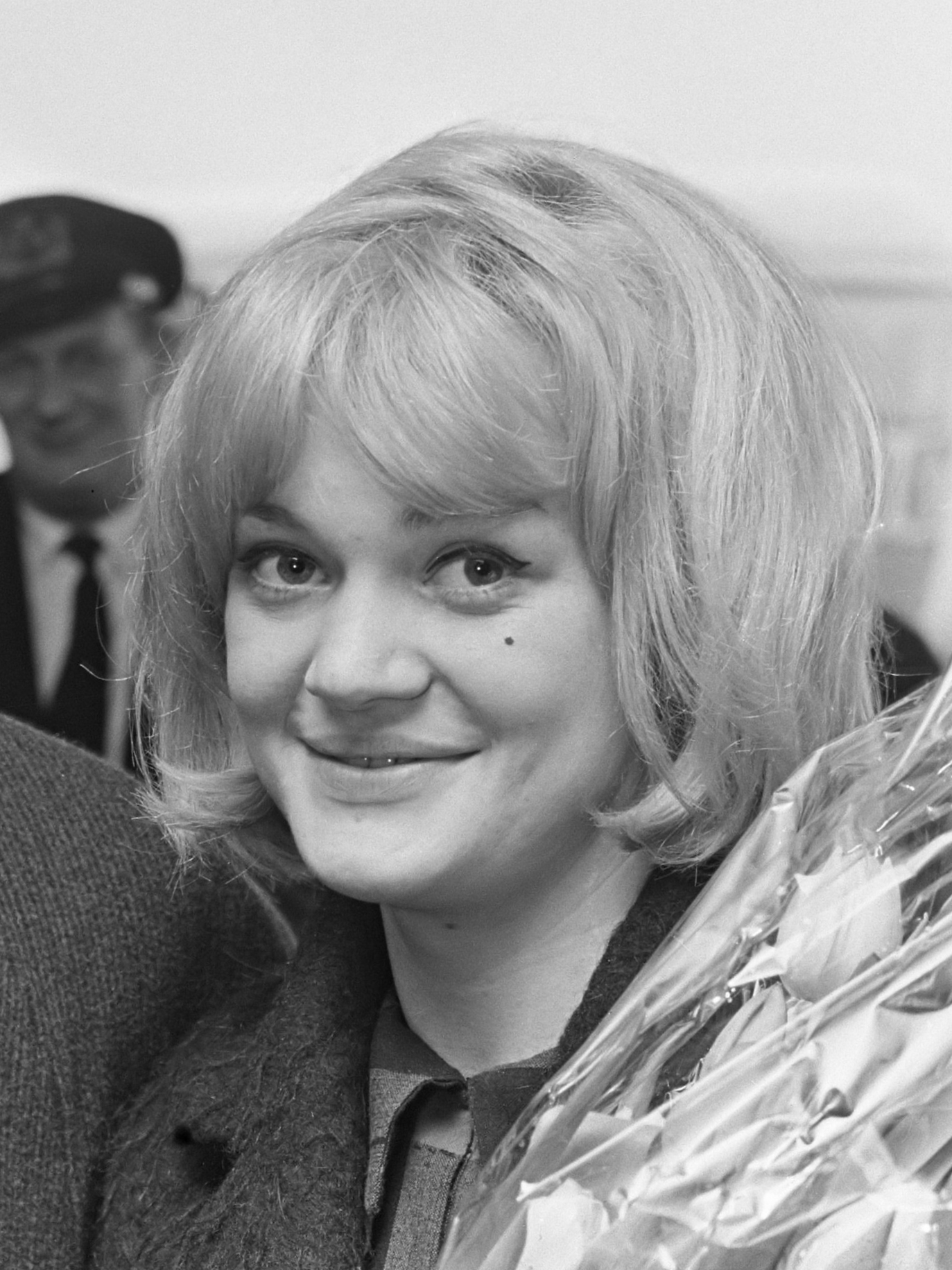
At age 18, Loves of a Blonde was Hana Brejchová's first film role and earned her 3rd place in the Best Actress category at the Venice Film Festival.

- Hana Brejchová as Andula
- Vladimír Pucholt as Milda
- Vladimír Menšík as Vacovský
- Ivan Kheil as Maňas
- Jiří Hrubý as Burda
- Milada Ježková as Milda's Mother
- Josef Šebánek as Milda's Father
- Josef Kolb as Pokorný
- Marie Salačová as Marie
- Jana Nováková as Jana
- Táňa Zelinková as Girl
- Zdena Lorencová as Zdena
- Jan Vostrčil as Colonel
- Antonín Blažejovský as Tonda

== Production ==
=== Background ===
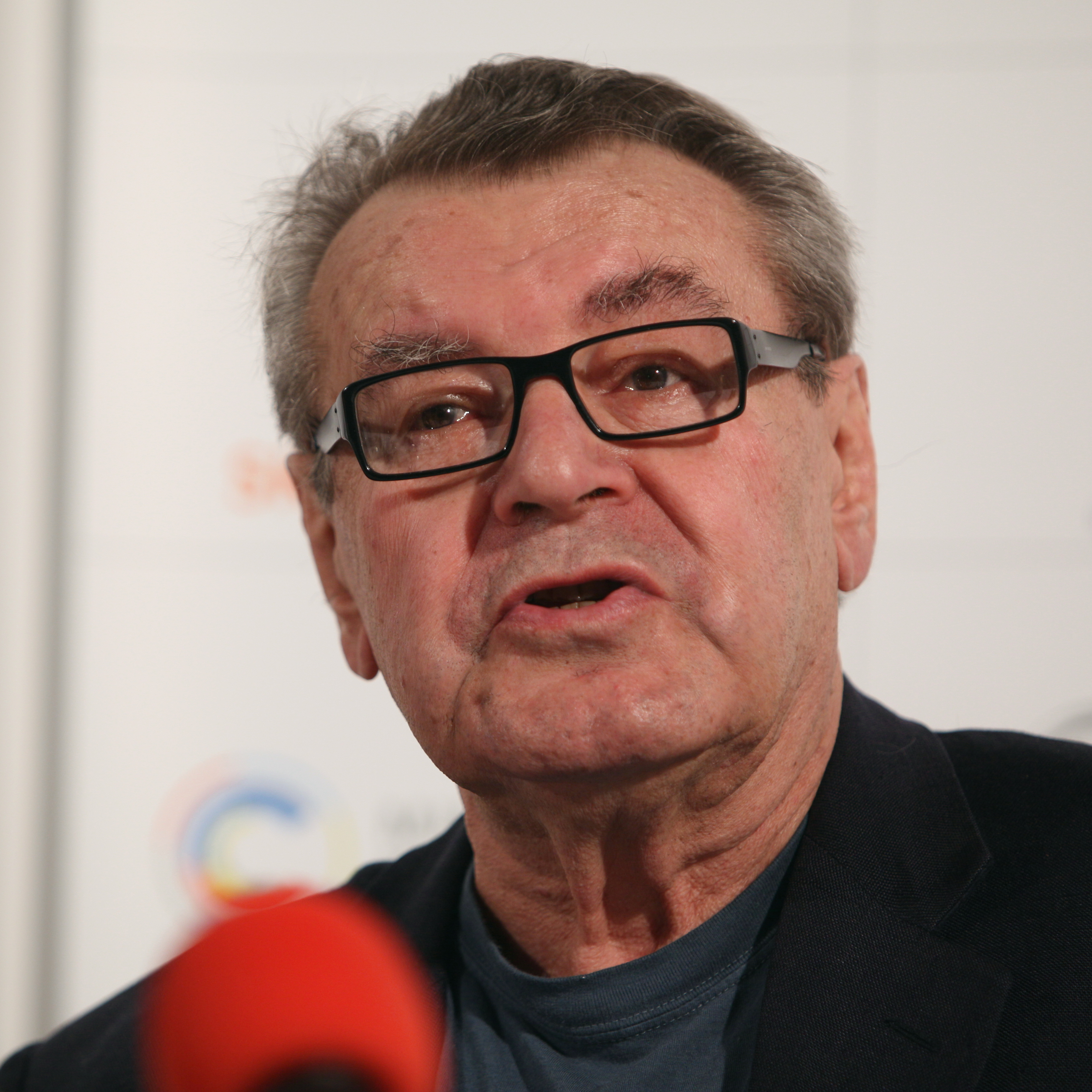
Miloš Forman

Miloš Forman's first feature film Černý Petr (Black Peter) was released in 1964 and was not viewed favorably by Czech governmental authorities until it was selected for competition at that year's Locarno Film Festival, where it won the top prize, thereby gaining the approval of Czechoslovakia's communist bureaucracy and making it possible for Forman to pursue further projects with relative freedom. Unsure of what the next project should be, Forman recalled an experience he had had driving around Prague late one evening when he had encountered a young woman struggling to cross a bridge while carrying a heavy suitcase. He gave her a lift and learned her story: she had come to the big city from Varnsdorf, where she had been seduced by a young engineer, who had given her a phony address in Žižkov and promised to take her away from her dreary life. After confirming that she had been duped, Forman interviewed the girl for much of the rest of the night, before putting her on a train back to her home town. Commentators have noted that Forman was particularly sensitized to such situations because when he was 10, his mother had been taken away by the Gestapo, never to be seen again, which led to years of Forman traveling around searching for security with nothing but a suitcase. In Forman's words: "I guess I'll always be moved by the sight of a young person with a suitcase seeking a connection in a strange city."

Forman recounted this memory to fellow film enthusiasts and colleagues Ivan Passer and Jaroslav Papoušek and asked them if it might be the basis for a good film. "Maybe", replied Passer, "but it still needs one more thing – a billiards table." The trio had a passion for billiards and felt that they could make a success of even the weakest idea if they had ready access to a table. Having found a good one at Dobříš Castle, the three, along with Václav Šašek, wrote a screenplay that fleshed out Forman's encounter with the young woman from Varnsdorf.

When the finished script was submitted to the Šebor-Bor production team, it was approved at first, only to have the chief of the script department pronounce it the dullest thing he'd read in years and urge Forman not to proceed with the project, since it would spoil the good reputation the director had established with Black Peter. In Forman's words: "It wasn't arty enough, but, on the other hand, it didn't have enough commercial appeal either. It would offend and irritate the public, he told me, because it made fun of the common man, who would be disgusted by it." Despite this objection, Vlastimil Harnach, the head of the studio, approved proceeding with the film in part because, due to the political and cultural thaw in Czechoslovakia at the time, decision makers were anxious to avoid the appearance of overt administrative interference in the creative process.

=== Casting ===
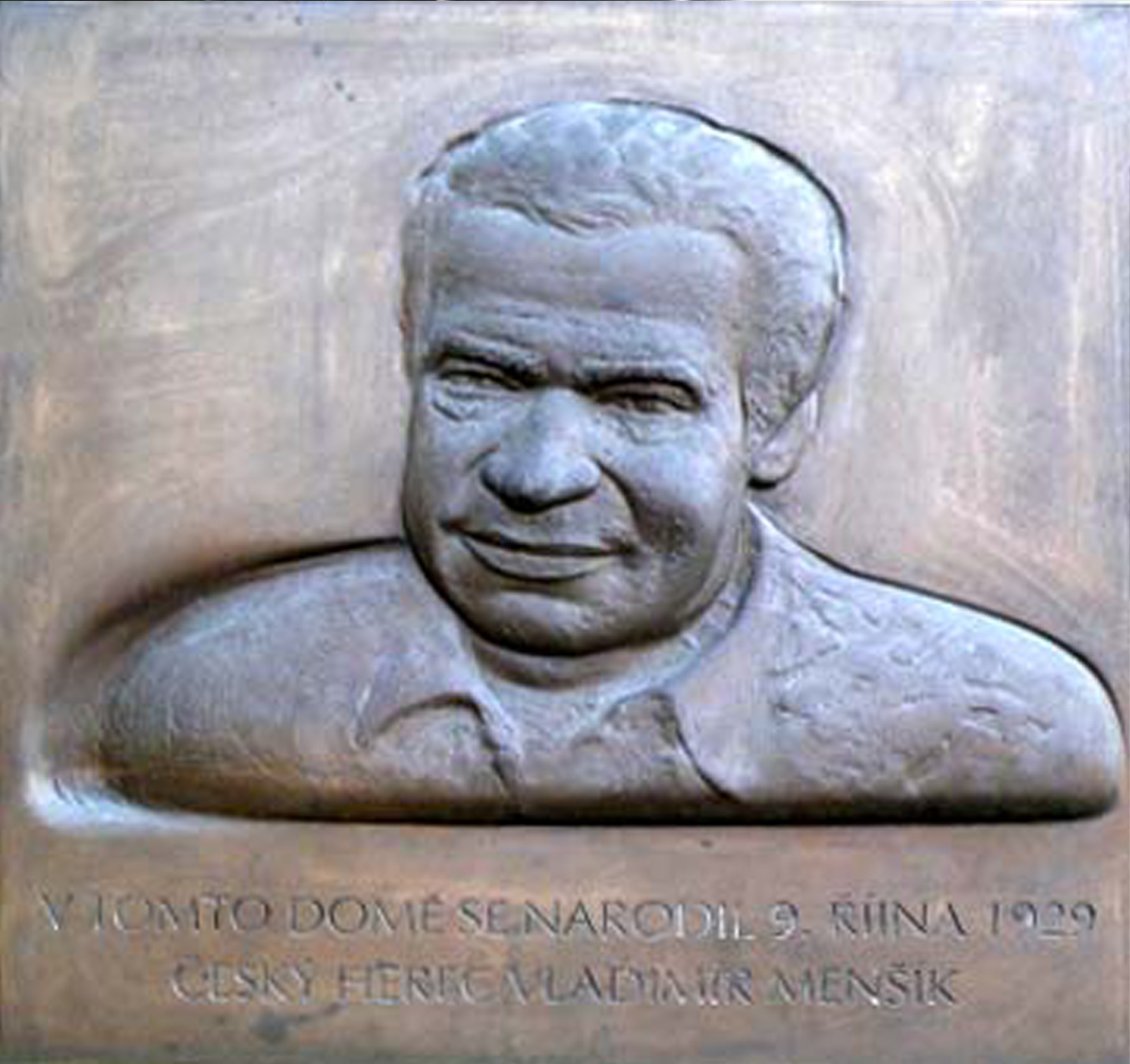
Memorial plaque for Vladimir Mensik, one of the few professional actors to appear in Loves of a Blonde

Forman and his colleagues were committed to the strategy of casting non-professionals and using dialogue improvisation whenever possible. Most of the actors were chosen from among relatives, friends and acquaintances of Forman and his crew, to the point where Forman was later to liken the atmosphere to making a "home movie". For the title role, Forman selected his 18-year-old ex-sister-in-law, Hana Brejchová, because he had known her a long time, trusted her, and had great respect for her natural talents: "She had an amazing ability of free expression, but with the risk that she didn’t recognize the extent. However, Vláďa Pucholt [who played Milda] held her firmly in the rhythm of the scene, in a professional position." The character of Milda's father was played by the uncle of Miroslav Ondříček's wife, and Milda's mother was played by a factory lathe operator whom Passer and Papoušek had met on a streetcar, and who struck them as someone who "seemed so interested in things around her, no matter how silly". The factory supervisor was played by the actual public relations manager of the factory at Zruč nad Sázavou, where location shooting took place. For the main trio of reservists, Forman wanted to use non-professionals, including the writer Josef Škvorecký, but found that, while the three men did well improvising together whenever they appeared in pairs, they lost their rhythm when all three were included in the same shot. So Forman went to Škvorecký and told the writer that he looked too intelligent to play his role and replaced him with the professional actor Vladimír Menšík. In Škvorecký's words: "To tell someone that he is too intelligent to be an actor is a very nice way of letting him know that he should stay with screen-play writing. Milos is a very considerate person. The fact that he so gently threw me out made possible the greatest scene of Loves of a Blonde". Forman was later to justify his decision to add a professional: "While nonactors keep the actors honest and real, the actors give the scene the rhythm and shape that the nonactors don't feel. A nonactor inhabits the situation so completely that he or she isn't able to view it from the outside, to perceive it as a rhythmic whole with its punctuation and its larger dramatic purpose. Nonactors are perfectly content to repeat themselves and ramble on, so an actor can pull them through the dramatic arch of the scene and draw out the emotional contours of the situation."

Ironically, the least self-confident performer in the film was one of the few professional actors: Vladimír Pucholt, who played the pianist. According to Forman: "This great actor, who had tremendous artistic intuition, completely mistrusted his talent. I think this was because he had a very rationalist disposition and could never see, much less measure, the result of his acting. 'Was it good, Mr. Forman?' he asked me after every perfect shot. 'It was excellent!' 'Really?' 'Really.' He never believed me and all of us loved him."

=== Filming ===
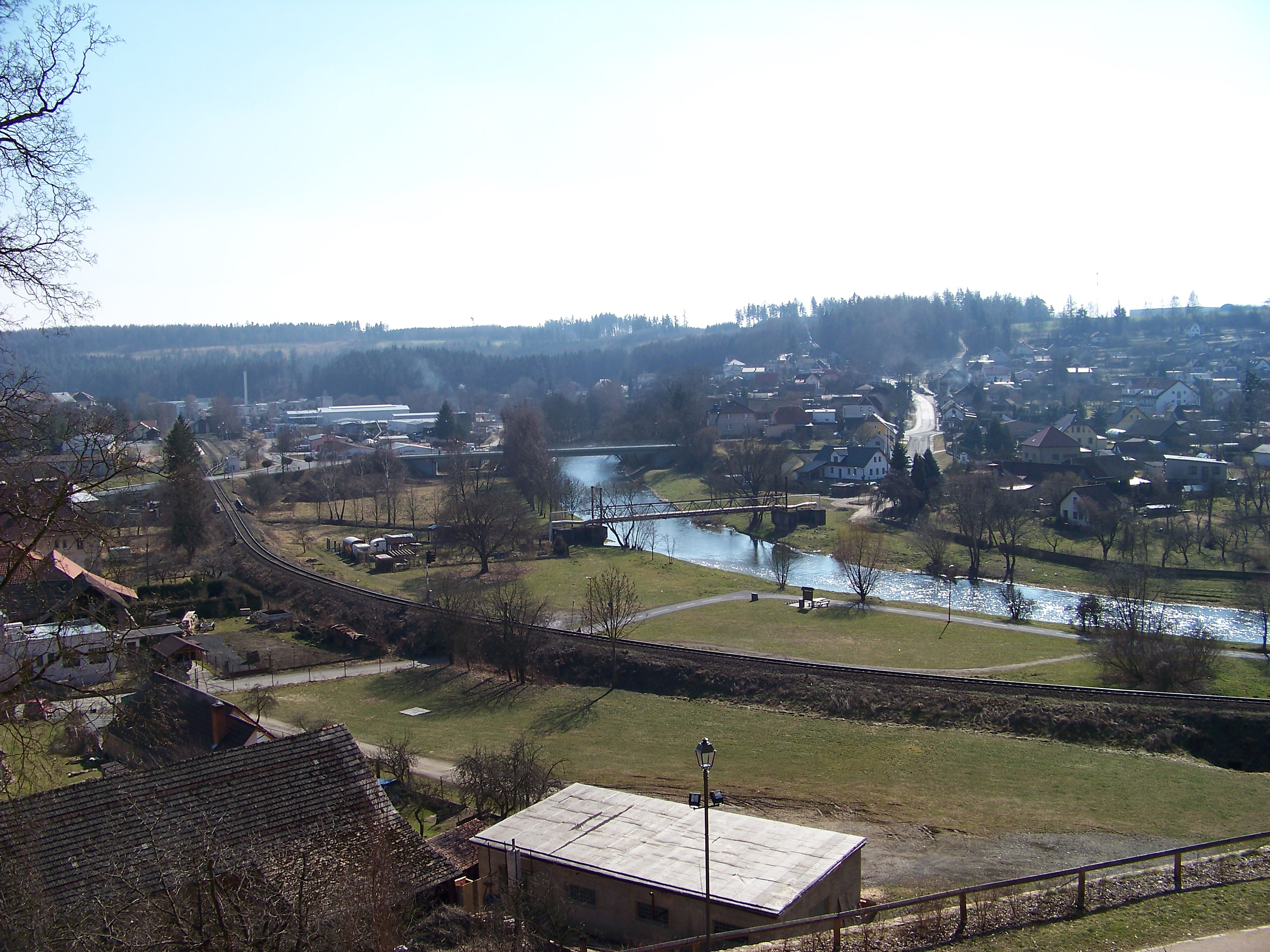
Zruč nad Sázavou was the location for much of the filming of Loves of a Blonde. According to Forman: “I remember those few months in Zruc-upon-Sazava as some of my sunniest days in the movie business. We had all the time we needed. We played billiards. We choked on laughter watching Pucholt fight his parents in the narrow double bed.”

Since he was working with a largely non-professional cast, Forman's operating procedure was never to share the script with any of the performers, because if he had given them the screenplay, "they’ll take it home to read, and their wives will end up directing your movie". Instead, he chose to explain each scene in great detail just before starting to shoot takes, reciting the dialog from memory only one time, so that when the camera was rolling the actors had to try to remember as much as they could of what he had told them and then improvise to the best of their ability what they had forgotten or only half-understood. His cameraman was later to say that, as a result, all the performers were playing Miloš Forman playing their roles.

The cinematographer for Loves of a Blonde was Miroslav Ondříček, like Forman a graduate of the FAMU. Ondříček and Forman had met at Czechoslovakia's Barrandov Studios in the early 1960s when Ondříček was just learning to shoot feature films and Forman was struggling to create his own early projects. Ondříček was in full accord with Forman's reliance on non-professional actors, adopting a cinéma-vérité style compatible with orthodox socialist realism. Ondříček was schooled in documentary filmmaking and, as a result, he insisted on performing all photographic tasks, like focus, lighting and composing, personally, while refusing access to the set by all film editors, saying: "The editor can only edit what I am filming. He can't use a master shot if he doesn't have it. He can't make a close-up if he doesn't have it. This is our [his and Forman's] job." Critics have often admired Ondříček's success in sustaining low-contrast lighting throughout the film, rendering "a sweetly mysterious softness, as if a principle of compassion existed in the world alongside its cruelty".

The big dance was the film's most sustained and elaborate sequence, so two cameras were used, with frequent recourse to hand-holding and telephoto zooming in order both to sustain the documentary-style look and feel and to take pressure off the performers, who were not always sure whether they were being included in the shots.

During filming, the set was visited by British director Lindsay Anderson, whose film This Sporting Life was greatly admired by Forman. Anderson was so impressed by Ondříček's work, that he brought the cameraman to England to film The White Bus and if...., announcing that he had found a person with a new sensibility, “a new pair of eyes”.

Ironically, the storyline of the film was replayed in real life. One of the nonprofessional actresses, a blonde factory worker, had a torrid affair with a technician who was part of the film crew. Although the man neglected to tell her that he was married with a child, he promised to send for her when he got back to Prague and set her up in an apartment in the capital city. After waiting for a long time to hear from him, and telling all her friends that she would shortly be summoned to her love nest, she packed up her belongings and traveled to Prague, only to be spurned in no uncertain terms. The consequence of this situation was grimmer than the denouement of the film; the girl was embarrassed to return home, became a prostitute, went to jail, attempted suicide and finally emigrated to Australia, where there was a shortage of women, especially among Czech emigrants.

=== Editing ===
Once principal photography was finished, Forman found himself with miles of raw material, so he and his editor, Miroslav Hájek, spent many long hours organizing the footage into a series of situations, like the "big dance" situation and the "meeting the parents" situation. In turn, each of these situations are constructed out of sequences of gags in which the characters improvise, in the words of commentator Constantin Parvulescu, "like various instruments of a band": "Many of these situations can be broken down into gags. There are several such gags reminiscent of early comedy in Loves of a Blonde: the soldiers-getting-off-the-train gag; the wine-bottle gag; the wedding-ring gag; the palm-reading gag; the roll-up-blinds gag; and the three-guys-in-two-beds gag." Interspersed with these gags are extended character improvisations, such as Milda's discussion of Picasso, his mother's rants at the dining table, and the factory supervisor's appeal for the army's support.

=== Additional scenes ===
Once the film had been released in Czechoslovakia, Forman sought an international distributor, who informed him that the film was too short for American audiences and that it did not have enough nudity in it; so Forman was coerced into shooting some additional scenes that were never shown for domestic consumption. One of these scenes, which was included in the US version, involved a slapstick sequence in which Milda, the pianist, tries to pick up a buxom girl on the streets of Prague, only to have her trick him into entering the wrong bedroom of the four-story building in which she lives, disturbing the sleeping residents.

== Themes ==
Film scholar Peter Hames has summarized three themes of Loves of a Blonde that have been discussed repeatedly in critical writings on the film, themes that have been something of a constant throughout Forman's career: "the impermanence of young love, the confusion and despair of middle age, and the gulf between the generations". Another theme that is often identified involves the awkwardness and confusion surrounding sex in a repressed society. Most critics have also commented on the confluence of comedy and sadness in the film's depiction of everyday life in a totalitarian state, although while some consider Loves of a Blonde Forman's most pointed critique of Czech society under communism, others point out that the grim conditions are not solely due to misguided public policy, but that individuals create their own isolation as well.

Forman himself has analyzed the scene that involves Milda sleeping with his parents: "It's a tight fit. The old man wants to sleep; the son would like to get thrown out so he can join the girl on the couch, but the mother runs the show and won't tolerate any such filthy ideas under her roof."

== Reception ==
When Loves of a Blonde was first released, there was a sense of betrayal on the part of the Zruč nad Sázavou shoe factory that had hosted the filmmakers on location and considerable consternation among authorities at the Ministry of Light Industry, with both organizations feeling that the comically unlovely depiction of social conditions in Czech factory towns would make it even harder to recruit workers than it already was. To everyone's surprise, though, the movie functioned as a "great big classified ad", in that hundreds of Czech boys traveled to Zruč nad Sázavou and camped out in the woods in hopes of hooking up with the female factory workers, who responded appropriately by sneaking out of their dorms at night for assignations with the campers.

Loves of a Blonde sold out in theaters throughout Czechoslovakia. The film was the recipient of the Order of Klement Gottwald, an award that recognized exemplary works "for building of socialist homeland". Forman was later to say: "The award from the first communist president of the land and a legendary boozer was more of an embarrassment than anything else. The only good thing about it was the fat envelope that came with the ribbon. It contained 20 000 CZK, nearly a year's salary".

Loves of a Blonde was submitted to a number of the major film festivals of the day: it was nominated for the highest prize at the 26th Venice International Film Festival and was chosen as the opening film of the 1965 London Film Festival and also opened the 1966 New York Film Festival. Shortly after it was completed, it was purchased by a Czech distribution company called Filmexport, only to be re-sold as part of a multi-picture package to a firm called CBK, which proceeded to air it on television through a number of 24-hour movie channels.

The film was nominated for the Golden Globe for Best Foreign Film and the Academy Award for Best Foreign Language Film in 1967. It was ranked No. 89 in Empire magazine's "The 100 Best Films Of World Cinema" in 2010.

=== Critical response ===
Critical reaction within Czechoslovakia tended to focus on the film's perceived negativity with regard to social and political conditions in the country, and, for that reason, it was not distributed at all within the Soviet Union.

On the whole, international critics of the time praised Loves of a Blonde, with positive reviews published by Saturday Review, The New Yorker, America, Sight and Sound, Harper's, and The New York Times. One of the film's most influential champions was Jean Collet, writing in Cahiers du cinéma that, by capturing the momentary indiscretions of his characters on the screen, Forman forces the audience into a voyeuristic situation that induces embarrassment and laughter. There were dissenting voices, however: Phillip J. Hartung, writing in Commonweal, compared the film unfavorably with Ivan Passer's contemporaneous Intimate Lighting, while Robert Hatch, in The Nation, felt that Loves of a Blonde was an "endearing but artless" film, with its long central section of the big dance having little to do with the main plot. In a lengthy article in Film Comment, Kirk Bond compared the "ordinariness" of Loves of a Blonde unfavorably with other Czech films of the period that he believed displayed greater mastery of narrative technique.

More recent retrospective reviews of the film have been equally mixed, with some critics, like Dennis Schwartz, writing that, "its simple but meaningful story has captured the emotions of its subject in a timeless and real fashion", while others, like David Nusair, find fault: "Presumably, the film's supposed to be a quirky and revealing slice of life – but since the central character is never developed beyond the superficial, it's impossible to care about her".

It holds a 94% rating on the review aggregator website Rotten Tomatoes from 17 reviewers who, on average, scored it 8.00 on a scale of 10.

== Legacy ==
"The new often springs from disillusionment over the old – so that was an impulse. It was the 1960s and the old rules no longer applied. There was a new 'auteur' approach with a new way of seeing the world, people, the classification of good and evil, criticism – always an attribute of youth – so those were the impulses. Also, the Czech New Wave sprang from others that came before – in Poland, in France, in America, and Britain's Angry Young Men. It was quite simply a break."

— Professor of Film Studies at Prague's Charles University Galina Kopaneva

Loves of a Blonde has often been identified as one of the most significant and ambitious productions of the Czech New Wave, a movement in which a group of young filmmakers, many of whom were educated by the national film academy in Prague (including Forman, Ján Kadár, Věra Chytilová and Jiří Menzel, among others), took significant political risks by using cinema to protest the hypocrisy and absurdity of the Communist state. This movement has been attributed to a period of cultural and political reform, starting in 1962, during which filmmakers were given state support, but were also allowed a certain amount of artistic freedom, enabling them to create movies with the stated objective of making "the Czech people collectively aware that they were participants in a system of oppression and incompetence which had brutalized them all."

In particular, Forman, Ivan Passer and Jaroslav Papoušek have collectively become known as the "Forman school" of filmmaking, which combines an interest in documentary realism, including consistent focus on the quotidian, with a surrealistic tendency to "uncover the hidden side of reality, its comical or monstrous quality which lies just beneath everyday mishaps, stutters and waverings". Diane Sippl has noted that, once Forman came to America and created his high-profile Hollywood productions, such as One Flew Over the Cuckoo's Nest, Hair and Amadeus, he was able to introduce into commercial cinema the same qualities that characterized his early films like Loves of a Blonde: "An acute observation of the ironic details of mundane life; an intimate understanding of emotions, both projected and silenced; a keen sensitivity to the moment when solemnity melts into farce..."

"(Loves Of A Blonde) endorsed everything I was trying to do in my own work but hadn't managed yet."

— British film director Ken Loach

English director Ken Loach has stated that the mixture of professional and non-professional actors in Loves of a Blonde had a significant influence on him and other international filmmakers, by creating an atmosphere in which non-professionals who live in the milieu depicted by the film bring an expertise and authenticity which serves as "a touchstone for everyone else in the film", while professionals bring knowledge of film craft, which can be helpful to their inexperienced colleagues. Although some performers who, at the time, were not professional later became so, one of the professional actors, Vladimír Pucholt, who played a major role, Milda the pianist, soon gave up acting, relocated to Canada and became a pediatrician.

In April 2019, a restored version of the film was selected to be shown in the Cannes Classics section at the 2019 Cannes Film Festival.

== Home media ==
Loves of a Blonde was released in VHS video format in 1984 by RCA/Columbia Pictures and re-released in that format in 2000 by Janus Films, Home Vision Cinema. In 2002, it was released as a DVD by Criterion Collection, in a new digital transfer, with restored image and sound, a video interview with director Milos Forman, a deleted scene and new & improved English subtitle translation. Since 2010, a version has been available as part of Criterion's "Essential art house" series.

== Awards and nominations ==
| Award/Festival | Category | Winner/Nominee | Result |
|---|---|---|---|
| Academy Award | Best Foreign Language Film | Miloš Forman | Nominated |
| Golden Globes | Best Foreign-Language Foreign Film | Miloš Forman | Nominated |
| Bodil Awards | Best European Film (Bedste europæiske film) | Miloš Forman | Won |
| Italian National Syndicate of Film Journalists | Best Foreign Director (Regista del Miglior Film Straniero) | Miloš Forman | Nominated |
| Jussi Awards | Best Foreign Director | Miloš Forman | Won |
| Venice Film Festival | Golden Lion | Miloš Forman | Nominated |

== See also ==
- List of submissions to the 39th Academy Awards for Best Foreign Language Film
- List of Czechoslovakia submissions for the Academy Award for Best Foreign Language Film
- List of Czech Academy Award Winners and Nominees

== Bibliography ==
- Forman, Miloš and Jan Novák. Turnaround: A Memoir. New York: Villard Books, 1994. ISBN 9780679400639
- Hames, Peter. The Czechoslovak New Wave. London: Wallflower Press, 2005. ISBN 9781904764427
- Liehm, Antonin J. The Miloš Forman stories. White Plains NY: International Arts and Sciences Press, 1975. ISBN 9780873320511
- Slater, Thomas J. Miloš Forman: A Bio-Bibliography. New York: Greenwood, 1985. ISBN 9780313253928
