= The Wishing Tree (1999 film) =

- Directed by: Ivan Passer
- Screenplay by: Grant Scharbo
- Produced by: Gina Matthews
- Starring: Alfre Woodard; Helen Shaver; Mary Alice; Blair Underwood
- Cinematography: Ousama Rawi
- Edited by: Richard Halsey; Tod Lautenberg
- Music by: Elia Cmiral
- Production companies: Dufferin Gate Productions; Hallmark Entertainment
- Distributed by: Showtime Entertainment
- Release date: July 22, 1999
- Running time: 105 minutes
- Country: United States
- Language: English

The Wishing Tree is a 1999 Canadian-American fantasy drama film directed by Ivan Passer and starring Alfre Woodard, Helen Shaver, Mary Alice and Blair Underwood. The film premiered on July 22, 1999, and later had its television premiere on February 20, 2000, on Showtime.

== Plot ==
Clara, a black lawyer who lives in Atlanta, returns to Savannah for her mother's funeral.

== Cast ==
- Alfre Woodard as Clara Collier
- Helen Shaver as Wallis Caldwell
- Mary Alice as Mattie Collier
- Blair Underwood as Magic Man / Thomas
- Charles Weldon as Al "Alfred" Brooks
- Leslie Carlson as Professor Caldwell
- Peter Haworth as Will
- Stephen Joffe as Jamie
- Ian D. Clark as Davies
- Kaleigh Nevin as Alexa
- Maria Ricossa as Philomena Parnell
- Jackie Richardson as Marianne Brooks

== Critical response ==
The Christian Science Monitor critic wrote in his review: "It has a few problems as a drama, but it has a good heart, a timely moral, and at least one fine performance. Alfre Woodard is always worth watching."

The film received three Daytime Emmy Awards nomination at the 28th Daytime Emmy Awards: Outstanding Performer in a Children's Special (Woodard), Outstanding Directing in a Children's Special (Passer) and Outstanding Writing in a Children's Special (Scharbo). Woodard received NAACP Image Award for Outstanding Performance by a Youth (Series, Special, Television Movie or Limited-series) nomination, and at the 22nd Young Artist Awards it received three nods for Best Family TV Movie/Pilot/Mini-Series - Cable, Best Performance in a TV Movie (Comedy or Drama) - Young Actress Age Ten or Under (Nevin) and Best Performance in a TV Movie (Comedy or Drama) - Young Actor Age Ten or Under (Joffe).
