= Black Peter (film) =

1964 film

- Film poster
- Černý Petr
- Directed by: Miloš Forman
- Written by: Miloš Forman; Jaroslav Papoušek
- Produced by: Rudolf Hájek
- Starring: Ladislav Jakim
- Cinematography: Jan Němeček
- Edited by: Miroslav Hájek
- Music by: Jiří Šlitr
- Production company: Filmové studio Barrandov
- Distributed by: Ústřední Půjčovna Filmu
- Release date: April 17, 1964
- Running time: 85 minutes
- Country: Czechoslovakia
- Language: Czech

Black Peter (original Czech title: Černý Petr, known also as Peter and Paula) is a 1964 film directed by Miloš Forman. It won the Golden Leopard award at the Locarno International Film Festival.

== Plot ==
Petr, a Czech teenager, begins working as a trainee in theft prevention at a grocery store. He is criticized by his employer for being too conspicuous and then, when he suspects a man of stealing, is too nervous to confront the man so he just follows him through the streets and then returns home, where his father admonishes him because the shop manager had come looking for him. His father peppers him with questions about how he acted and why he did not do anything to stop the man.

Petr likes Pavla, who is dating Mara. Petr and Pavla go for a swim together and then lie on the grass, where they are harassed by Čenda and Zdeněk, two apprentice bricklayers. Later, at a party, the drunken Čenda sees them together and repeatedly argues with Petr. He becomes upset when the master mason notices them fighting and blames Petr for making him look bad in front of the boss, then asks to borrow money. Petr lends him the money and Čenda buys more drinks to work up the courage to tell a girl in blue that he likes her, but the girl in blue has already begun to dance with someone else. Petr dances with Pavla but is unfamiliar with the popular moves. When he gets home, his mother interrogates him about all the details of the evening.

The next day Petr delivers two prints of famous paintings to the shop but one falls and breaks the glass and frame. He takes the print, of a naked woman, with him on a date with Pavla. The next day at work Petr sees the man he followed before and notifies his boss, but his boss shakes the man's hand and takes him into the back room. Confused, Petr watches a woman steal several bags of sweets by hiding them in her bag but does not stop her. Petr once again faces a barrage of questions from his father about his behavior and why he failed to act. His father suspects that his inaction was in retaliation for something that had gone wrong at the shop but Petr refuses to explain.

His father laments the fact that he invested in a violin and an accordion that remained unused while Petr bought a guitar that is unable to earn him any money. As Petr's father is yelling at him, Čenda knocks on the door. Petr's parents insist that Čenda come inside and sit down. Čenda returns the money that Petr lent him and Petr's mother offers him a piece of cake. When they learn that Čenda is an apprentice bricklayer, Petr's father makes Čenda show Petr his hands so that his son can see what hardworking hands look like. Zdeněk reminds Čenda that they must leave. Čenda attempts to stay because he finds the family fight interesting but when he is asked by Petr's father what is so interesting he backs away in fear. Petr's father continues with the argument, attempting to explain his perspective on what is important.

== Cast ==
- Ladislav Jakim as Petr
- Pavla Martínková as Pavla
- Jan Vostrčil as Petr's father
- Vladimír Pucholt as Čenda
- Pavel Sedláček as Sako
- Zdeněk Kulhánek as Zdeněk
- Frantisek Kosina as shop manager
- Josef Koza as master mason
- Božena Matušková as Petr's mother
- Antonín Pokorný as thief
- Jaroslav Kladrubský as stockkeeper
- Františka Skálová as customer
- Jaroslav Bendl as Franta
- Majka Gillarová as Pavla's friend
- Jaroslava Rážová as girl in blue
- Dana Urbánková as girl on a boat
- Zuzana Opršalová
- František Pražák as Sako's friend

== Production and release ==
Černý Petr was filmed in 1963 and holds a 1963 copyright notice but it did not premiere on screen until April 17, 1964.

== Accolades ==
Černý Petr won the Golden Leopard at the 1964 Locarno International Film Festival.
