= Pavel Sedláček (musician) =

Czech musician

- Born: 4 July 1941 (age 84); Prague, Protectorate of Bohemia and Moravia
- Genres: Rock and roll
- Occupations: Musician, songwriter
- Instruments: Vocals, guitar
- Website: Official website his Cadillac Band

Pavel Sedláček (born 4 July 1941 in Prague, Protectorate of Bohemia and Moravia, today Czech Republic) is a Czech rock and roll singer, songwriter and guitarist. When he was 15 played "Rock Around the Clock" on the show for amateur musicians. From 1962 he collaborated with theatre Semafor. At the same time he recorded the song "Život je pes" (in Czech "Life is a dog") which became his first hit. In 1968 he attended Czech Technical University in Prague.

== Other websites ==
- Official website his Cadillac Band
