= Valmont (film) =

1989 film by Miloš Forman

- Theatrical release poster
- Directed by: Miloš Forman
- Screenplay by: Jean-Claude Carrière; Miloš Forman
- Based on: Les Liaisons dangereuses 1782 novel by Pierre Choderlos de Laclos
- Produced by: Michael Hausman; Paul Rassam
- Starring: Colin Firth; Annette Bening; Meg Tilly; Fairuza Balk; Siân Phillips; Jeffrey Jones; Henry Thomas
- Cinematography: Miroslav Ondříček
- Edited by: Nena Danevic; Alan Heim
- Music by: Christopher Palmer
- Production companies: Renn Productions; Timothy Burrill Productions
- Distributed by: Orion Pictures (United States); AMLF (France)
- Release date: November 17, 1989 (US)
- Running time: 137 minutes
- Countries: United States; France
- Language: English
- Budget: $33,000,000 (estimated)
- Box office: $1,132,112 (domestic)

Valmont is a 1989 romantic period drama film directed by Miloš Forman and starring Colin Firth, Annette Bening, and Meg Tilly. Based on the 1782 French novel Les Liaisons dangereuses by Choderlos de Laclos, and adapted for the screen by Jean-Claude Carrière, the film is about a scheming widow (Merteuil) who bets her ex-lover (Valmont) that he cannot corrupt a recently married honorable woman (Tourvel). During the process of seducing the married woman, Valmont ends up falling in love with her. Earlier, Merteuil learns her secret lover (Gercourt) has discarded her and is about to marry her cousin's daughter- the virginal 15 year old Cécile. As revenge, the jilted Merteuil employs Valmont (during his pursuit of Tourvel) to seduce Cécile before her marriage to Gercourt.

Valmont received an Oscar nomination for Best Costume Design (Theodor Pištěk). It was Fabia Drake's final film role.

== Plot ==
In 18th century France, the Marquise de Merteuil, a wealthy widow, learns that her secret lover Gercourt will marry Cécile de Volanges, a 15-year-old who was raised in a convent to ensure her chastity. It is rumored that Gercourt cannot easily break off relations with his "former" mistress who is mentally unbalanced. Angered over the hypocrisy of Gercourt's insistence on a virgin bride while keeping a lover of his own, his concealment of the upcoming marriage, and his slight of her character, Merteuil plans revenge.

Merteuil proposes to her former lover, the womanizer Vicomte de Valmont, that he take Cécile's virginity before her wedding night to humiliate Gercourt. Valmont is not interested in Cécile, as he is pursuing Madame de Tourvel, a married woman. Tourvel, well known for her virtue, had been warned of Valmont's debauchery and deliberately avoids him. Merteuil makes Valmont a wager: if he succeeds in bedding Madame de Tourvel, he may also bed Merteuil; if he fails, he must consign himself to a monastery.

Merteuil learns that Cécile's teenage music teacher, Danceny, has fallen in love with Cécile. She attempts to facilitate the consummation of their relationship, but Cécile is too innocent and Danceny too honorable to take advantage. Frustrated, Merteuil takes Cécile on holiday to the country estate where Valmont had gone to pursue Tourvel. When Merteuil suggests that Valmont help Cécile write love letters, he complies, goes to Cécile's room and ends up taking her virginity. Afterwards, a guilt-wracked Cécile runs to Merteuil for comfort, believing neither her future husband nor Danceny could now want her. Merteuil encourages the girl to marry Gercourt and keep Danceny as her lover.

Despite her many attempts to avoid Valmont, Tourvel is finally seduced. In the morning, she writes to her husband about her new lover, then leaves for the market to prepare a meal. When she returns, Valmont has already left.

To "reward" Valmont, Merteuil indifferently spreads herself on the bed and waits for him to get on with it, causing him to storm out. As revenge, he goes to Cécile and convinces her to write Danceny a letter. In it, she explains that Merteuil convinced her to cast Danceny as her lover instead of marrying him. Tourvel later comes to Valmont and spends the night, leaving before he wakes the next morning. Her loss causes him to realize he truly cared for her. He goes to Tourvel's residence to find she has reconciled with her husband. Valmont leaves roses for Tourvel on her unkempt bed and slips out without being seen.

Valmont returns to Merteuil and proposes marriage, saying they would be better off working together than against one another. She sadly reminds him that they were married once before and that any marriage between them could only end in betrayal. Merteuil then reveals that Danceny is in her bed; he had come to threaten her, but she seduced him and told him everything. Valmont leaves in a fury and goes to Cécile, suggesting they leave the country, so that Cécile will be free to love whom she chooses. Instead, Cécile reveals that she has confessed everything to her mother, who orders Valmont from the house.

The next day, Danceny challenges Valmont to a duel to avenge Cécile's honor. Valmont prepares for the duel by drinking himself into a stupor and arrives hung over. The honorable Danceny refuses to duel him in his condition and is willing to accept an apology. Instead, Valmont attacks, forcing Danceny to kill him in self-defense.

Valmont's funeral is filled with his former lovers, including Merteuil, who is devastated at the loss of her best friend and oldest rival. During it, Cécile reveals that she is carrying his child. The grieving Madame de Rosemonde, Valmont's aunt, is overjoyed by the news. Cécile and Gercourt are soon married in a grand ceremony, with Danceny surrounded by a pack of eligible young women. Meanwhile, Merteuil remains alone, having lost Gercourt, Danceny, and Valmont.

Some time later, Madame de Tourvel lovingly places a rose on Valmont's tomb before returning to her waiting husband.

== Cast ==
- Colin Firth as Valmont
- Annette Bening as Merteuil
- Meg Tilly as Madame de Tourvel
- Fairuza Balk as Cécile de Volanges
- Siân Phillips as Madame de Volanges
- Jeffrey Jones as Gercourt
- Henry Thomas as Raphael Danceny
- Fabia Drake as Madame de Rosemonde
- T. P. McKenna as Baron
- Isla Blair as Baroness
- Ian McNeice as Azolan
- Aleta Mitchell as Victoire
- Ronald Lacey as José
- Vincent Schiavelli as Jean
- Sandrine Dumas as Martine

== Production ==
=== Differences from the novel ===
The plot of Valmont differs significantly from Laclos's novel. In the novel, Cécile miscarries Valmont's child, and at the end retires to a convent; in Valmont she is pregnant at her wedding. In the novel, letters between Valmont and Merteuil are exposed, and Merteuil is publicly ridiculed and humiliated; in Valmont, the letters are not mentioned, and Merteuil has no downfall except in the eyes of Cécile and her mother. She also does not suffer from the physical disfigurement described by Laclos in the denouement. Madame de Tourvel's future is less tragic: instead of dying of a broken heart, she returns to her forgiving and understanding older husband.

Valmont's cast originally included actor Wil Wheaton, but he had to decline at the last minute to work on the first episode of the 3rd season of Star Trek: The Next Generation.

=== Filming ===
The film was shot at Versailles, the Château de La Motte-Tilly (Aube), in Nancy (Meurthe-et-Moselle), in Montfort-l'Amaury (Yvelines), at the Great Stables of Chantilly (Oise), and at the Musée Nissim de Camondo in Paris.

== Release ==
=== Theatrical release ===
Valmont was released to theaters in the United States on November 17, 1989, for a limited run.

=== Missing scenes on the Region 1 DVD ===
The Region 1 DVD released in 2002 by MGM is missing a short sequence after Valmont wakes up alone from his last night with Tourvel. In the sequence, Valmont takes flowers to Tourvel's home later the same day, but on arrival discovers that she is back with her husband. Unseen by either, he leaves the flowers on her bed before heading off to confront Merteuil. The sequence is included in the 2000 MGM VHS release, and is also in the high-definition transfer shown on MGM HD.

== Critical response ==
On the review aggregator website Rotten Tomatoes, 50% of 34 critics' reviews are positive, with an average rating of 6.3/10. The website's consensus reads: "Valmont undermines the essential qualities of its main character's literary counterpart, but solid casting and Milos Forman's deft direction help mitigate those flaws." On Metacritic, it has a weighted average score of 55 from 14 critics, indicating "mixed or average reviews". The film was not as highly acclaimed as Stephen Frears' Dangerous Liaisons, which was released less than a year earlier.

In his review for the Chicago Sun-Times, Roger Ebert gave Valmont three and a half out of four stars. Comparing it to Dangerous Liaisons, which was based on the play rather than the novel, Ebert wrote that Valmont was a much different film than its predecessor. Where Dangerous Liaisons was "cerebral and claustrophobic, an exercise in sexual mindplay", Forman's version was "more physical" and the seductions more arousing.

In his review for Rolling Stone, Peter Travers gave the film a mixed review. While observing that the film was "rapturously beautiful, enticing us into a lush, aristocratic world", he felt that there was "nothing funny in the sight of Merteuil's decking out Cécile like a whore, nothing sexy in Valmont's indifferent rape of Cécile, nothing heroic in Valmont's futile duel with Danceny." Travers concluded, "Overlong and marred by clashing accents and acting styles, Valmont lacks the wit and erotic charge of Dangerous Liaisons. But Forman's vision is, finally, more humane, more devastating."

In her review in The New York Times, film critic Janet Maslin observed that the film "contributes virtually nothing to the body of information surrounding Les Liaisons Dangereuses." Maslin's major criticism was that the film lacked the "bite" of its predecessor, trivialized its characters, and showed "a troubling lack of focus".

In her review in The Washington Post, Rita Kempley was equally unimpressed with Valmont, describing it as "sumptuous suds, a broadly played trivialization of de Laclos's 18th-century novel of boudoir intrigue". Kemply concluded:

With its callow cast and playful tone, there is nothing dangerous about Forman's variation on the novelist's schemes. It's a naughty costume dramedy in which the erotic conquests of bored libertines are transformed into children's kissing games.

The film was selected for screening as part of the Cannes Classics section at the 2016 Cannes Film Festival.

== Awards and nominations ==
Award	Category	Nominee(s)	Result
Academy Awards	Best Costume Design	Theodor Pištěk	Nominated
British Academy Film Awards	Best Costume Design	Theodor Pištěk	Nominated
César Awards	Best Director	Miloš Forman	Nominated
César Awards	Best Costume Design	Theodor Pištěk	Won
César Awards	Best Production Design	Pierre Guffroy	Won
César Awards	Best Poster		Nominated
Chicago Film Critics Association Awards	Most Promising Actress	Annette Bening	Nominated
London Critics Circle Film Awards	Newcomer of the Year	Annette Bening	Won

== See also ==
- Dangerous Liaisons
- Cruel Intentions
