= Hana Brejchová =

Czech actress (1946–2024)

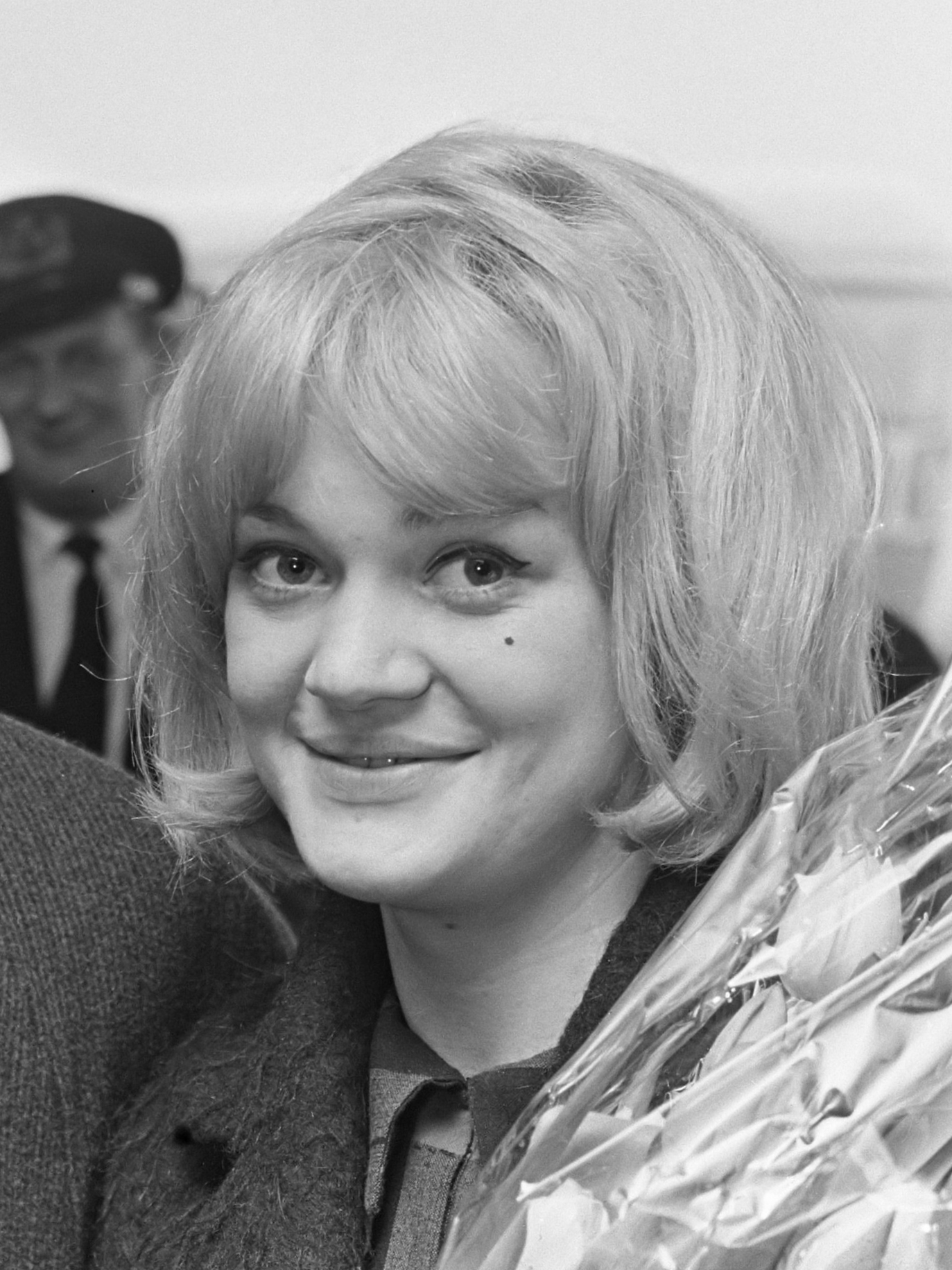
- Brejchová in 1966
- Born: 12 December 1946; Prague, Third Czechoslovak Republic
- Died: April 2024 (aged 77); Buštěhrad, Czech Republic
- Occupation: Actress
- Years active: 1965–1995
- Relatives: Jana Brejchová (sister); Tereza Brodská (niece)

Hana Brejchová (12 December 1946 – April 2024) was a Czech actress. She performed in over 30 films and was the sister of actress Jana Brejchová.

She died at a nursing home in Buštěhrad, around 20 April 2024, at the age of 77.

== Filmography ==
Year	Title	Role	Notes
1965	Loves of a Blonde	Andula	
1967	Stronghold of Toughs	Marija	
1968	Jak se zbavit Helenky	newsreader Marcelka	
1968	Žirafa v okne	Milena	
1969	Nejkrásnější věk	Vránová	
1969	À quelques jours près	Květa	
1970	Po stopách krve	innkeeper Vlasta Veselá	
1978	Já to tedy beru, šéfe...!	Anička	
1978	Dinner for Adele	Madam #3	uncredited
1981	Matěji, proč tě holky nechtějí?	Cupalová	
1981	Kaňka do pohádky		
1981	Velké přání		
1981	Láska na druhý pohled	clerk	
1982	Má láska s Jakubem	teacher	
1984	Angel in a Devil's Body	Member of The Salvation Army	
1984	Evo, vdej se!	Hodková	
1984	Amadeus	Czech actor	
1986	Nebo být zabit	prisoner	
1986	Vyhrávat potichu	Péťa's mother	
1986	Zastihla mě noc	Božka	
1986	Zlá krev	waitress in café	1 episode
1988	Cirkus Humberto	Moesecková	5 episodes
1989	Vážení přátelé, ano		
1991	Byli jsme to my?		
1995	Divoké pivo		
