= Miroslav Ondříček =

Czech cinematographer

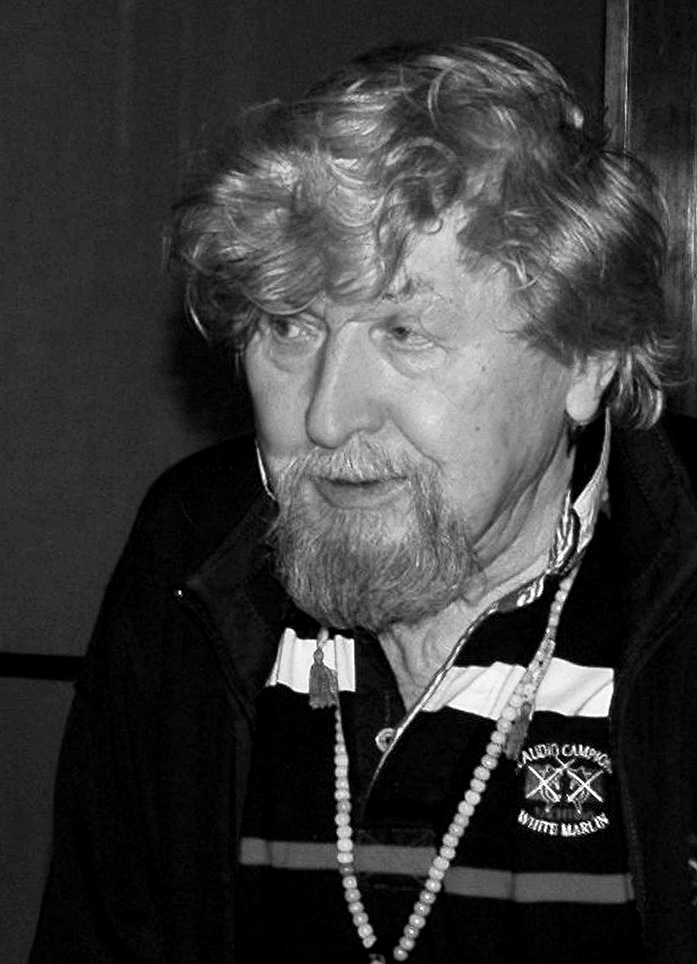
- Ondříček in 2012
- Born: 4 November 1934; Prague, Czechoslovakia
- Died: 28 March 2015 (aged 80); Prague, Czech Republic
- Occupation: Cinematographer

Miroslav Ondříček (4 November 1934 – 28 March 2015) was a Czech cinematographer. He worked on over 40 films, including Amadeus, Ragtime and If.....

== Life and career ==
Miroslav Ondříček was born in Prague, Czechoslovakia (now the Czech Republic). He studied filmmaking at the Barrandov Studio Training School and began making movies during the Czech New Wave. His first feature film work was on Miloš Forman's Talent Competition. He continued his long working relationship with Forman in the US on such films as Hair (1979), Ragtime (1981) and Amadeus (1984). He also collaborated with the British film director Lindsay Anderson on three films: the short The White Bus (1967), If.... (1968) and O Lucky Man! (1973).

== Family ==
He is the father of the film director David Ondříček, and was a member of the board of the Film School in Pisek.

== Death ==
Ondříček died in Prague at the age of 80.

== Selected filmography ==
- Riding in Cars with Boys (2001)
- The Preacher's Wife (1996)
- Let It Be Me (1995)
- A League of Their Own (1992)
- Awakenings (1990)
- Valmont (1989)
- Funny Farm (1988)
- Big Shots (1987)
- F/X (1986)
- Heaven Help Us (1985)
- Amadeus (1984)
- Silkwood (1983)
- The World According to Garp (1982)
- Ragtime (1981)
- Dark Sun (1980)
- Hair (1979)
- The Divine Emma (1979)
- O Lucky Man! (1973)
- If.... (1968)
- The Fireman's Ball (1967)
- Loves of a Blonde (1965)

== Awards ==
=== Academy Awards (Oscars) ===
- Nominated – 1984 Best Achievement in Cinematography for Amadeus
- Nominated – 1981 Best Achievement in Cinematography for Ragtime

=== BAFTA Film Awards ===
- Won – 1984 Best Cinematography for Amadeus
