= List of Czech films of the 2000s =

A List of Czech films of the 2000s.

Title	Director	Cast	Genre	Notes
2000
Anděl Exit	Vladimír Michálek	Jan Čechtický, Klára Issová	Crimi Drama	
Divided We Fall	Jan Hřebejk	Bolek Polívka, Anna Šišková, Csongor Kassai	War drama	nominated for Academy Award for Best Foreign Language Film, Czech Lion Award for best film
Ene bene	Alice Nellis	Iva Janžurová, Eva Holubová	Comedy	
Kytice	F. A. Brabec	Martina Bezousková, Sylvie Kraslová, Sára Vorísková	Drama	
Little Otik	Jan Švankmajer	Veronika Žilková, Jan Hartl, Jaroslava Kretschmerová	Horror comedy	Czech Lion Award for best film
Out of the City	Tomáš Vorel	Tomáš Hanák	Romantic Comedy	Tomáš Hanák
Princezna ze mlejna 2	Zdeněk Troška	Radek Valenta, Andrea Černá	Fairy Tale Film	A sequel to Princezna ze mlejna
Samotáři	David Ondříček	Ivan Trojan	Comedy	
Spring of Life	Milan Cieslar	Monika Hilmerová, Michal Sieczkowski	War drama	
The Conception of My Younger Brother	Vladimír Drha	Dana Vávrová, Jiří Bartoška, Vladimír Dlouhý	Drama	Entered into the 22nd Moscow International Film Festival
The Pilgrimage of Students Peter and Jacob	Drahomíra Vihanová	Gustav Řezníček, Adrian Jastraban	Drama	
Victims and Murderers	Andrea Sedláčková	Karel Roden, Ivana Chýlková	Drama	Entered into the 23rd Moscow International Film Festival
2001
Babí léto (Autumn Spring)	Vladimír Michálek	Vlastimil Brodský, Stella Zázvorková	Black comedy	
Dark Blue World	Jan Svěrák	Ondřej Vetchý, Kryštof Hádek, Tara Fitzgerald	War film	submitted for Academy Award for Best Foreign Language Film, not nominated
Rebelové	Filip Renč	Zuzana Norisová, Jan Révai, Tomáš Hanák	romantic comedy, Musical	
Wild Bees	Bohdan Sláma	Zdenek Rauser, Tatiana Vilhelmová, Marek Daniel	Black comedy	submitted for Academy Award for Best Foreign Language Film, not nominated
2002
The Damned	Dan Svátek		Drama	Entered into the 24th Moscow International Film Festival
Girlie	Benjamin Tuček	Dorota Nvotová, Jana Hubinská	Drama	
Výlet	Alice Nellis		Road movie	
Year of the Devil	Petr Zelenka		Mockumentary	Czech Lion Award for best film
2003
Jedna ruka netleská	David Ondříček		Black comedy	
Kameňák	Zdeněk Troška	Václav Vydra; Jana Paulová	Comedy	
Smart Philip	Václav Marhoul	Tomáš Hanák	Criminal comedy	
Most	Bobby Garabedian		Drama	
Nuda v Brně	Vladimír Morávek		Comedy	Czech Lion Award for best film
Želary	Ondřej Trojan	Aňa Geislerová, Iva Bittová, František Velecký, György Cserhalmi	Romantic drama, war drama	Slovak co-production, nominated for Academy Award for Best Foreign Language Film
2004
Alien vs. Predator	Paul W. S. Anderson	Sanaa Lathan	Science fiction action horror film	United States, United Kingdom, Canada and Germany Coproduction
Choking Hazard			Comedy horror	
Czech Dream	Vít Klusák, Filip Remunda		Documentary film	
Kameňák 2	Zdeněk Troška	Václav Vydra; Jana Paulová	Comedy	
Mistři	Marek Najbrt		Comedy	
Snowboarďáci	Karel Janák	Vojtěch Kotek, Jiří Mádl	Comedy	
Up and Down	Jan Hřebejk		Comedy	submitted for Academy Award for Best Foreign Language Film, not nominated; Czech Lion Award for best film
2005
A Sound of Thunder	Peter Hyams	Edward Burns	Science Fiction Action film	Coproduction with United Kingdom, the United States and Germany
The City of the Sun	Martin Šulík	Oldřich Navrátil	Comedy film	Slovak co-production; Submitted for Academy Award for Best Foreign Language Film (by Slovakia), not nominated
Doom	Andrzej Bartkowiak	Karl Urban	Science Fiction Action film	Coproduction with the United States, United Kingdom and Germany.
Kameňák 3	Zdeněk Troška	Václav Vydra; Jana Paulová	Comedy	
Lunacy	Jan Švankmajer		Horror	submitted for Academy Award for Best Foreign Language Film, not nominated
Skřítek	Tomáš Vorel	Bolek Polívka, Eva Holubová	Comedy	
The Torchbearer	Václav Švankmajer		Animated horror film	
Příběhy obyčejného šílenství	Petr Zelenka		Comedy-drama	Entered into the 27th Moscow International Film Festival
Something Like Happiness	Bohdan Sláma	Aňa Geislerová, Pavel Liška, Tatiana Vilhelmová	Black comedy	submitted for Academy Award for Best Foreign Language Film, not nominated; Czech Lion Award for best film
Source	Martin Mareček		Documentary	
2006
Beauty in Trouble	Jan Hřebejk		Tragicomedy	
I Served the King of England	Jiří Menzel		Drama	Slovak co-production; submitted for Academy Award for Best Foreign Language Film, not nominated; Czech Lion Award for best film
Rafťáci	Karel Janák	Vojtěch Kotek, Jiří Mádl	Comedy	
Ro(c)k podvraťáků	Karel Janák	Jiří Mádl, Martin Písařík	Comedy	
2007
Citizen Havel	Pavel Koutecký, Miroslav Janek		Documentary	A documentary film focusing on the former Czech president Václav Havel.
The Country Teacher	Bohdan Sláma	Pavel Liška	Drama	
Dolls	Karlin Babinská	Sandra Nováková, Marie Doležalová, Petra Nesvačilová, Oldřich Hajlich	Comedy, Drama	
Empties	Jan Svěrák	Zdeněk Svěrák, Tatiana Vilhelmová, Daniela Kolářová, Jiří Macháček	Comedy	
Little Girl Blue	Alice Nellis	Iva Bittová, Anna Šišková, Karel Roden, Ivan Franěk	Drama/Comedy	Slovak co-production, Czech Lion Award for best film
Roming	Jiří Vejdělek	Marián Labuda, Boleslav Polívka, Vítězslav Holub, Jean Constantin	Comedy	Slovak co-production
Rules of Lies	Robert Sedláček	Jiří Langmajer	Psychological thriller	
It's Gonna Get Worse	Petr Nikolaev	Karel Židek	Drama	
Václav	Jiří Vejdělek	Ivan Trojan	Drama	Based on a true story.
2008
Karamazovi	Petr Zelenka		Drama	submitted for Academy Award for Best Foreign Language Film, not nominated; Czech Lion Award for best film
Občan Havel	Miroslav Janek, Pavel Koutecký		Documentary	
Svatba na bitevním poli			Comedy	
Tobruk	Václav Marhoul		War film	
Bába	Zuzana Kirchnerová		Short drama	Won 1st Prize in the Cinéfondation section at the 2009 Cannes Film Festival
Exponát roku 1827			Animation; silent	
2009
Little Knights Tale	Karel Janák	David Prachař, Dany Mesároš	Comedy	
Normal	Julius Ševčík	Milan Kňažko, Pavel Gajdoš, Dagmar Veškrnová, Miroslav Táborský, Jan Vlasák, Zuzana Kajnarová, Meto Jovanovski	Thriller	
Protector	Marek Najbrt		Romantic war drama	submitted for Academy Award for Best Foreign Language Film, not nominated; Czech Lion Award for best film
Kawasaki's Rose	Jan Hřebejk		Drama	submitted for Academy Award for Best Foreign Language Film
Solomon Kane	Michael J. Bassett	James Purefoy	Action-adventure	Coproduction with United Kingdom and France.
Toys in the Attic	Jiří Barta		Animated	
