= List of Czech actresses =

A list of notable Czech actresses.

== A ==
- Monika Absolonová
- Zlata Adamovská
- Jaroslava Adamová
- Jana Andrsová

== B ==
- Lída Baarová
- Zdeňka Baldová
- Eliška Balzerová
- Tereza Bebarová
- Lucie Bílá
- Iva Bittová
- Dagmar Bláhová
- Mahulena Bočanová
- Jiřina Bohdalová
- Blanka Bohdanová
- Magdaléna Borová
- Hana Brejchová
- Jana Brejchová
- Edita Brychta
- Terezie Brzková
- Slávka Budínová
- Zuzana Bydžovská
- Petra Bryant

== C ==
- Andrea Černá
- Soňa Červená
- Vlasta Chramostová
- Miriam Chytilová
- Ivana Chýlková
- Jitka Čvančarová

== D ==
- Jana Dítětová
- Marie Doležalová
- Michaela Dolinová
- Milena Dvorská

== F ==
- Vlasta Fabianová
- Květa Fialová
- Táňa Fischerová
- Veronika Freimanová
- Vera Fusek

== G ==
- Věra Galatíková
- Anna Geislerová
- Nataša Gollová
- Truda Grosslichtová
- Yana Gupta

== H ==
- Štěpánka Haničincová
- Dagmar Havlová
- Antonie Hegerlíková
- Hana Hegerová
- Zdena Herfortová
- Jana Hlaváčová
- Ivana Hloužková
- Kateřina Holánová
- Hana Holišová
- Eva Holubová
- Eva Hudečková

== I ==
- Klára Issová
- Martha Issová

== J ==
- Zorka Janů
- Iva Janžurová
- Klára Jerneková
- Jiřina Jirásková
- Eva Josefíková

== K ==
- Zita Kabátová
- Miriam Kantorková
- Zora Kerova
- Eva Klepáčová
- Barbora Kodetová
- Daniela Kolářová
- Naďa Konvalinková
- Jana Krausová
- Věra Kubánková

== L ==
- Kristýna Leichtová
- Anna Linhartová
- Olga Lounová

== M ==
- Adina Mandlová
- Suzanne Marwille
- Taťjana Medvecká
- Dana Medřická
- Jitka Moučková
- Míla Myslíková

== N ==
- Růžena Nasková
- Antonie Nedošinská
- Jarmila Novotná

== O ==
- Jaroslava Obermaierová

== P ==
- Dagmar Patrasová
- Tereza Pergnerová
- Jiřina Petrovická
- Lenka Pichlíková-Burke
- Marie Pilátová
- Simona Postlerová
- Jana Preissová

== R ==
- Irma Reichová
- Zora Rozsypalová
- Helena Růžičková
- Linda Rybová

== S ==
- Libuše Šafránková
- Olga Scheinpflugová
- Olga Schoberová
- Jiřina Šejbalová
- Alena Šeredová
- Lola Skrbková
- Růžena Šlemrová
- Petra Špalková
- Jiřina Steimarová
- Jiřina Štěpničková
- Jarmila Šuláková
- Jana Švandová
- Jiřina Švorcová
- Libuše Švormová
- Dana Syslová

== T ==
- Věra Tichánková
- Pavla Tomicová
- Jiřina Třebická
- Lucie Trmíková
- Eva Turnová

== U ==
- Ivana Uhlířová

== V ==
- Hana Vagnerová
- Marta Vančurová
- Dana Vávrová
- Zuzana Vejvodová
- Zora Vesecká
- Tatiana Vilhelmová
- Hana Vítová
- Lenka Vlasáková
- Helena Vondráčková
- Lucie Vondráčková
- Tereza Voříšková

== W ==
- Blanka Waleská
- Kateřina Winterová

== Z ==
- Lucie Žáčková
- Hana Zagorová
- Lucie Žáčková
- Stella Zázvorková
- Lucie Zedníčková
- Jitka Zelenohorská
