= Džob =

2025 Czech comedy film

- Directed by: Tomáš Vorel
- Written by: Tomáš Vorel; Sany; Barbora Vlčková
- Produced by: Miloslav Šmídmajer; Jaroslav Sedláček; Tomáš Vorel
- Starring: Tomáš Vorel Jr., Jiří Mádl
- Cinematography: Tomáš Vorel
- Edited by: Filip Maryško
- Music by: Yzomandias; Ladislav Zensor
- Distributed by: Continental Film
- Release date: 31 July 2025
- Running time: 87 minutes
- Country: Czech Republic
- Language: Czech
- Box office: 49,804,883 CZK

Džob (lit. 'Job') is a 2025 Czech comedy film co-written, co-produced and directed by Tomáš Vorel. A sequel to the 2014 comedy film Vejška.

== Cast ==
- Tomáš Vorel Jr. as Petr Kocourek
- Jiří Mádl as Michal Kolman
- Ivana Chýlková as Michal's mother
- Jan Kraus as Michal's Father
- Zuzana Bydžovská as Petr's mother
- Filip Vorel as Jindra
- Diana Dulínková as Michal's girlfriend Kristýna
- Eva Podzimková as Julie
- Vilma Cibulková as Kolman's wife mother
- Kristýna Leichtová as a nurse
