= Comeback (TV series) =

Czech sitcom

- Title card
- Genre: Comedy
- Created by: Tomáš Baldýnský; Jiří Vaněk; Petra Soukupová; Tomáš Holeček; Richard Malatinský; Vladimír Fanta
- Directed by: Petr Fišer; Jaroslav Fuit; Jiří Diarmaid Novák; Zdeněk Dušek
- Starring: Tomáš Matonoha; Martin Dejdar; Dana Batulková; Kristýna Leichtová; Matouš Ruml; Marie Doležalová; Simona Babčáková
- Country of origin: Czech Republic
- Original language: Czech
- No. of seasons: 2
- No. of episodes: 51 + 8 short specials (list of episodes)

Production
- Producer: Tomáš Baldýnský
- Camera setup: Multi-camera
- Running time: 30 minutes
- Production company: CET 21

Original release
- Network: TV Nova
- Release: 24 September 2008 – 24 October 2011

Comeback is a Czech television sitcom that premiered on TV Nova on 4 September 2008. The first season was broadcast in 2008, and the second one came out in 2010. The series was then cancelled despite its popularity and plans for season 3. In August 2023, it was announced that the show would return for a third season, consisting of sixteen episodes. It will reportedly be filmed in 2024.

== Synopsis ==
The sitcom revolves around Tomáš Pacovský, owner of a music store named U Dvou Akordů (At the Two Chords), and his family. His brother Ozzák (the name "Ozzák" is an allusion to an Ozzy Osbourne fan) is a chronic alcoholic who loves heavy metal music. The majority of jokes and gags are about his alcoholism and his absolute belief in metal music. Ozzák professes this opinion: Music which isn't related (more or less) to metal is trash, and not worth selling, but metal is the real deal, and so it should be given away for free. Tomáš has a teenage daughter Iva who is (seemingly) the only normal member of the family, although she has her funny moments as well.

Other characters include members of the Bůček family: Simona, a slightly odd, middle-aged woman with a very hooked nose, who works in a pub named U Jezevce (At the Badger's) in the first season, where Ozzák spends most of his free time and money. She has two children. They are neighbours of the Pacovský family. Lexa is an unintelligent boy who is in love (albeit platonically) with Iva. Lexa also admires Ozzák and does everything Ozzák says. Saša is a very quiet girl who sometimes thinks of herself as invisible. One of her personality quirks, for example, is that whenever she tries to lie, she faints. The Buček family are very poor and Simone often takes drastic measures to keep them in the black.

The last main character is Marcela. Her husband is Zoran Divić, a gangster from Croatia, and a big fan of HNK Hajduk Split soccer team and Tomi Paci. She helps in Tomáš' store as a volunteer, because music is her hobby. Marcela disapproves of Ozzák's long hair and his love of heavy metal music and sometimes she refuses to work with him. It may seem that she doesn't like Ozzák, but she actually develops a kind of relationship with him.

== Cast and characters ==
- Tomáš Matonoha as Tomáš Pacovský aka Tomi Paci
- Martin Dejdar as František "Ozzák" Pacovský
- Dana Batulková as Marcela Divić
- Kristýna Leichtová as Iva Pacovská
- Matouš Ruml as Alexandr "Lexa" Bůček
- Marie Doležalová as Alexandra "Saša" Bůčková
- Simona Babčáková as Simona Bůčková

=== Special guests ===
- Karel Gott as himself (episode "Gott Ex Machina")
- Stanislav Hložek as himself (episode "Gott Ex Machina")
- Helena Vondráčková as herself (episode "Pomáhat a chránit")
- Vlastimil Harapes as himself (episode "Taneční")
- Tomáš Hanák as Zoran Divić (episode "Rozzvod")
- Marek Vašut as himself (episodes "Rozzvod" and "Bejk")
- Norbert Lichý as Otto Šlus (episode "Berňák")
- Tomáš Baldýnský as Zoran's bodyguard (episode "Rozzvod")
- Lucie Hadašová as Cover girl (episode "Rozzvod")
- Marie Pochobradská as Renata Machová (episode "Těžká hodina")
- Zuzana Bydžovská as Beer woman (episode "Absťák")
- Monika Žáková as Libuše Krobová (episodes "Souboj titánů", "Mrtvý muž")
- Eva Slovíková as Lexa's girl Dajana (episode "Je jaro")
- Jiří Hána as Robber (episode "Lupiči")
- Jana Plodková as Police officer (episode "Lupiči")
- Jitka Smutná as Robber (episode "Lupiči")
- Kamil Švejda as Exterminator (episode "Giganti")
- Leoš Noha as Plumber (episode "Zlatá rybka")
- Roman Štabrňák as Locksmith (episode "Zlatá rybka")
- Jitka Sedláčková as Social worker (episode "Simonina volba")
- Marie Málková as Firefighter (episode "CzechSteh")
- David Máj as Psychologist (episode "Mrtvý muž")
- Jakub Gottwald as Interpreter for the Dalai Lama (episode "Berňák")
- Jiří Bábek as Judge in cooking contest (episode "Koprovka")
- Marcela Nohýnková as Zoran's mum (episode "Koprovka")
- Nikol Kouklová as Girl in video (episode "Rozzvod")
- Lenka Loubalová as Opera singer (episode "Pan Prase odchází")
- Brutus as themselves (episode "Pan Prase odchází")
- Marcela Holubcová as Customer (episode "Krev, pop a slzy")
- Josef Polášek as Jaromír Šimara (episode "Děvečka z Lidečka", "Bez kláves neodejdu")
- Jana Holcová as Mrs. Veselá (episode "Děvečka z Lidečka")
- Pavla Tomicová as Woman (episode "Komu zvoní hrany")
- Ali Morovin as Italian contestant (episode "Zlatá ledvina")
- Eva Leinweberová as Job centre worker
- Štěpán Škorpil as Moderator (episode "Zlatá ledvina")
- Železný Zekon as himself (episode "Zlatá ledvina")
- Věra Kubánková as Neighbour Vojtíčková (episode "Boží frisbee")
- Andrea Černá as Dance teacher (episode "Sbohem, Káhiro")
- Karel Zima as Plumber (episode "Sbohem, Káhiro")
- Lucie Borhyová as Mother of Vašut's son (episode "Bejk")
- Vladimír Hrbek as Retired person (episode "Let mouchy")
- Jindřich Bonaventura as Neighbour Bajer (episode "Obraz paní Rybkové")
- Adam Halaš as Mime (episode "Sulc")
- Tomáš Legierski as Neighbour Roubal (episode "Sulc")

== Awards ==
- ANNO 2008 – 3rd place
