= Vejška =

2014 Czech comedy film

- Directed by: Tomáš Vorel
- Written by: Pasta Oner, Tomáš Vorel
- Produced by: Miloslav Šmídmajer
- Starring: Tomáš Vorel Jr., Jiří Mádl
- Cinematography: Tomáš Vorel
- Edited by: Šimon Hájek
- Music by: Mike Trafik
- Distributed by: A-Company Czech
- Release date: 23 January 2014
- Running time: 85 minutes
- Country: Czech Republic
- Language: Czech
- Budget: 23,000,000 CZK
- Box office: 19,906,118 CZK

Vejška (lit. 'University') is a Czech comedy film directed by Tomáš Vorel. A sequel to the 2007 comedy film Gympl, it was released in 2014.

== Cast ==
- Tomáš Vorel Jr. as Petr Kocourek
- Jiří Mádl as Michal Kolman
- Ivana Chýlková as Michal's Mother
- Jan Kraus as Michal's Father
- Zuzana Bydžovská as Petr's Mother
- Eva Podzimková as Julie
- Tomáš Vorel as professor Servít
- Václav Marhoul as investigator
- Jakub Kohák as professor Slanina
- Radomil Uhlíř as butcher
- Tomáš Vaněk as classmate Martin
- Martina Gasparovič Bezoušková as associate professor
- David Vávra as professor Kalous
- Filip Vorel as Jindra
