= Lillian Malkina =

Czech-Russian actress

- Born: Lillian Solomonovna Malkina; July 14, 1938 (age 87); Tallinn, Estonia
- Years active: 1960 – present

Lillian Malkina (born July 14, 1938) is a Soviet, Czech and Russian actress.

== Early life ==
Malkina was born in Tallinn. From childhood, she attended drama club, where she trained with Vladimir Korenev, Larisa Luzhina, Vitali Konyayev. In 1960 she graduated from the Saint Petersburg State Theatre Arts Academy and became an actress for Tallinn Russian Drama. She appeared in theaters in Leningrad and Moscow. She played comedic roles.

Since 1992, she has lived and worked in Prague, in the Czech Republic. She appears in European cinema and Czech television series, playing in five theaters simultaneously.

== Filmography ==
- 1965 — The Big Cat's Tale as episode
- 1970 — Attention, Turtle! as Vova's grandmother
- 1977 — Steppe as Rosa
- 1978 — Leaving — leave as Nina Grigoryevna
- 1981 — Where did Fomenko? as Korobkina
- 1987 — Island of Lost Ships as Frida
- 1989 — Rouen Virgin Nicknamed Pyshka as old nun
- 1991 — Khraniteli as Lobelia Sackville-Baggins (Lyubeliya Lyakoshel)
- 1992 — White Clothes as Professor Pobiyaho
- 1994 — Giorgino as Mrs.Vennepeyn
- 1996 — The Adventures of Pinocchio as woman in laundry
- 1997 — Kolya as Tamara, Kolya's grandmother
- 1999 — Le sourire du Clown as bag lady
- 2000 — Geisterjäger John Sinclair as nurse
- 2001 — On Behalf of Baron as Ethel
- 2006 — Ro(c)k podvraťáků as Radek's grandmother
- 2006 — Fascination of Evil as nurse
- 2007 — Hostel: Part II as make-up woman
- 2007 — Grindhouse as the Grandmother (segment 'Thanksgiving')
- 2008 — Pani Malkina — Czech Ranevskaya as herself
- 2008 — Taková normální rodinka as Babicka
- 2008 — Ošklivka Katka as episode
- 2010 — Občanský průkaz as Míta's Grandmother
- 2013 — Mirrors as episode
- 2015 — Vánocní Kamenák as Doorkeeper Muzíková
- 2020 — Hello, grandma! (voice)
- 2022 — Stárí není pro sraby as Lounová
- 2025 — Extremist
