= Jiří Mádl =

Czech actor, director and screenwriter (born 1986)

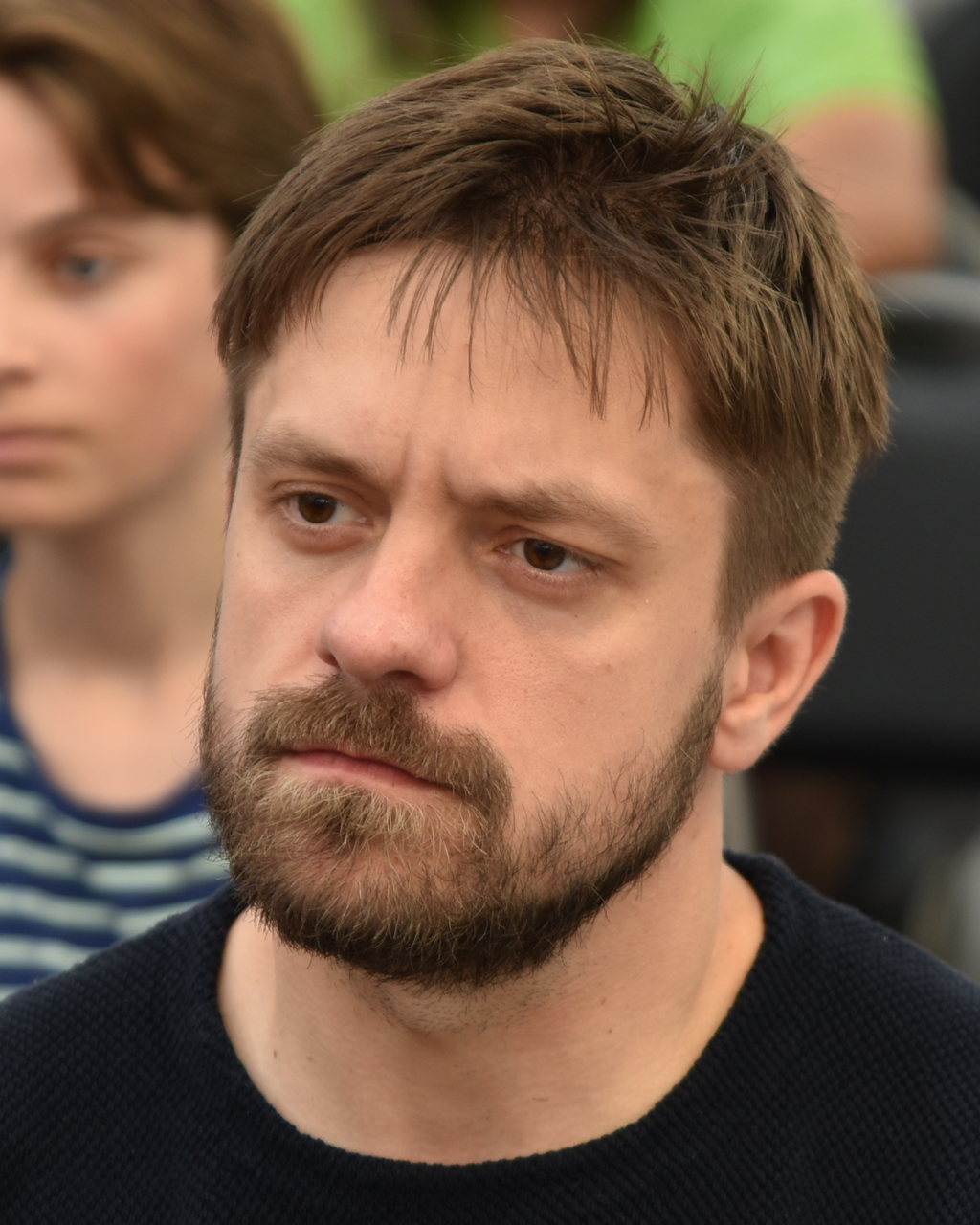
- Born: 23 October 1986 (age 38); České Budějovice, Czechoslovakia
- Occupation(s): Actor, film director, screenwriter
- Years active: 2004–
- Children: 1

Jiří Mádl Czech pronunciation (born October 23, 1986) is a Czech film actor, director and screenwriter.

== Biography ==
He was born in České Budějovice.

Among his most prominent roles are a part in the 2008 film Night Owls, for which received the Best Actor award at the 2008 Karlovy Vary International Film Festival. For his performance in Droneman (2020), he received the Czech Lion Award for Best Supporting Actor at the 2020 Czech Lion Awards.

Mádl made his directorial debut with the movie To See the Sea. His second movie On the Roof was released in 2019. His third film, historical drama Waves, depicting struggle of a Czechoslovak Radio crew against Soviet occupation in 1968, premiered at the 2024 Karlovy Vary International Film Festival, and was submitted for the Academy Award for Best International Feature Film at the 97th Academy Awards, making the shortlist.

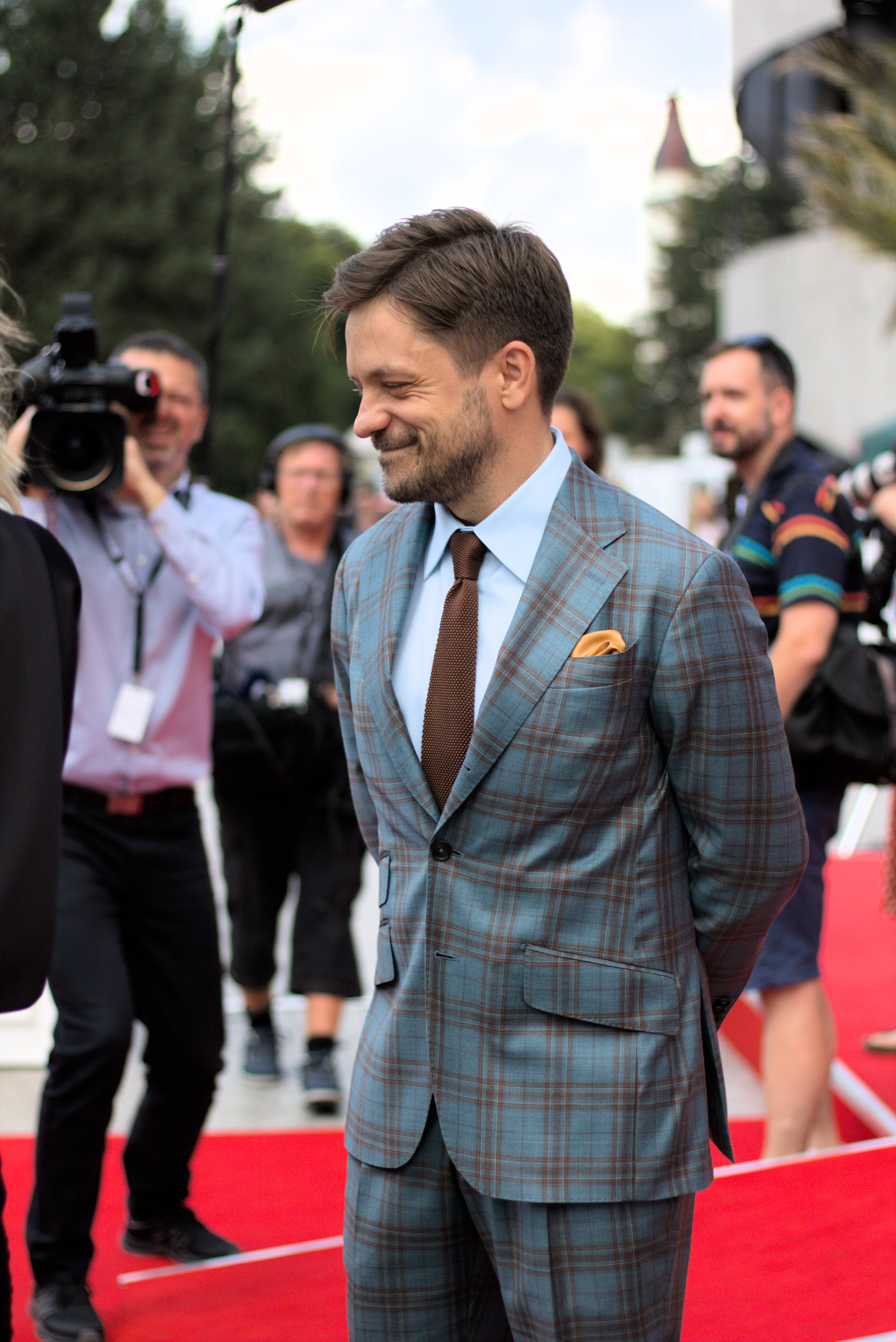
Jiří Madl during the premiere of his recent film Waves (Vlny)

== Filmography ==
=== Director, screenwriter ===
- To See the Sea (2014)
- Celebrity s.r.o. (2015)
- On the Roof (2018)
- Waves (2024)

=== Actor ===
- Snowboarďáci (2004) – Jáchym
- Ro(c)k podvraťáků (2006) – Márty Mašek
- Taming Crocodiles (2006) – Vašek Rychman
- Rafťáci (2006) – Filip
- Gympl (2007) – Michal Kolman
- Taková normální rodinka (2008) – Zdeněk
- Bathory (2008) – Cyril the monk
- Night Owls (2008) – Ubr
- Ctrl Emotion (2009) – Viktor
- It Is Hell With the Princess (2009) – Prince Jeroným
- The Magical Duvet (2011) – Mr. Karel
- Colette (2013) – Vili Feld
- Vejška (2014) – Michal Kolman
- The Devil's Mistress (2016) – Hans Fischer
- Sever (2019) – Petr Svoboda
- Droneman (2020) – Plech
- Bet on Friendship (2021) – Gay man
- Džob (2025) – Michal Kolman
