= Tomáš Matonoha =

Czech actor (born 1971)

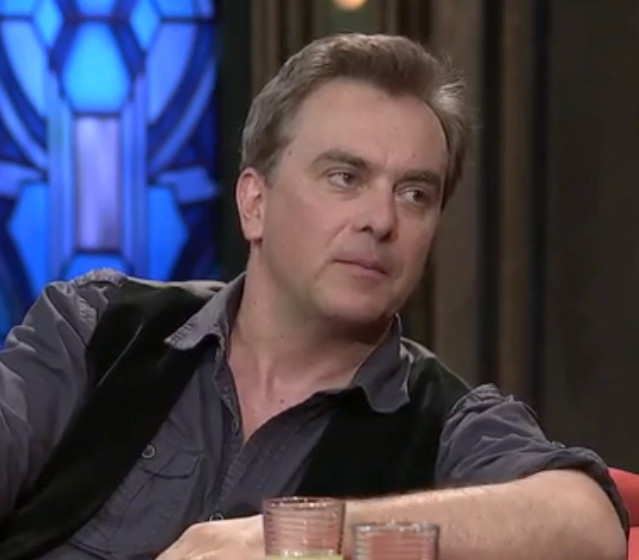
- On Show Jana Krause in 2018
- Born: 13 March 1971 (age 55); Brno, Czechoslovakia
- Occupation: Actor
- Years active: 1994–present
- Spouse: Lucie Benešová
- Children: 3

Tomáš Matonoha (born 13 March 1971) is a Czech actor.

== Biography ==
Tomáš Matonoha was born in Brno. He studied at JAMU (Janáček Academy of Music and Performing Arts). In 1994 he became a member of the ensemble of the HaTheatre in Brno. In 2005 he began performing at the Prague's theatre Rokoko.

== Filmography ==
- Prázdniny 3 (2019) - (Laco Lehotský)
- Prázdniny 2 (2018) - (Laco Lehotský)
- Prázdniny (2017) - (Laco Lehotský)
- Polski Film (2012)
- Ulovit miliardáře (2009)
- Comeback (2008) TV series (Tomáš Pacovský)
- Stand Up Comedy (2008) TV series (various characters)
- Gympl (2008)
- Bobule (2007)
- Láska In Memoriam (2007) (TV)
- Bestiář (2006)
- Dámský Gambit (2007) (TV)
- Hrubeš a Mareš jsou kamarádi do deště (2006)
- Happy Birthday (2006)
- Doblba (2005)
- The Masters (2004)
- Muž, kterého chtějí (2004) (TV)
- Komediograf (2003) (TV)
- Vyhnáni z ráje (2003)
- Wild Bees (2003)
- Zpráva o putování studentů Petra a Jakuba (2000)
- Byl jednou jeden polda 2 (1996)
- Byl jednou jeden polda (1995)

== Personal life ==
With actress Lucie Benešová has a son Štěpán Matonoha. Together cradled Lucie's son Lucian Blažek and adopted a daughter Sára.
