= Babicka =

Babicka or Babička may refer to:

- Babička (The Grandmother (novella)), an 1855 novel by Božena Němcová
- Babicka (1922 film), a Czech film
- Babička (1940 film), a Czech film from Němcová's novel
- Babička (1971 film), a Czech TV film
- Babicka (2003 film), a Czech film
- 7490 Babička, an asteroid
- "Babička", a song by Karel Gott
- Shavy Babicka, Gabonese professional footballer
