= Všechno nejlepší! =

2006 Czech comedy film

- Directed by: Martin Kotík
- Written by: Petr Nepovím, Martin Kotík
- Produced by: Martin Kotík
- Starring: Jan Dolanský, Viktor Preiss, Pavel Zedníček, Tomáš Matonoha
- Cinematography: Miroslav Čvorsjuk
- Edited by: Matouš Outrata
- Music by: Tomáš Polák
- Distributed by: Bontonfilm
- Release date: 2006
- Running time: 96 minutes
- Country: Czech Republic
- Language: Czech

Všechno nejlepší! is a Czech comedy film. It was released in 2006.

== Cast ==
- Jan Dolanský
- Viktor Preiss
- Pavel Zedníček
- Vendula Křížová
- Jaromír Dulava
- Jana Hlaváčová
- Tereza Kostková
- Pavel Šimčík
- Adéla Gondíková
- Jana Štěpánková
- Alice Bendová
- Naďa Konvalinková
- Tomáš Matonoha
- Izabela Kapiasová
- Miriam Kantorková
- Jitka Nováková
- Emil Linka
