= Bet on Friendship =

- Czech: Prvok, Šampón, Tečka a Karel
- Directed by: Patrik Hartl
- Written by: Patrik Hartl
- Cinematography: Tomáš Sysel
- Distributed by: Bontonfilm
- Release date: 29 July 2021 (Czech Republic)
- Running time: 118 minutes
- Country: Czech Republic
- Language: Czech
- Budget: 44,000,000 CZK
- Box office: 92,830,114 CZK

Bet on Friendship (Czech: Prvok, Šampón, Tečka a Karel, literally Protozoan, Shampoo, Dot and Karel) is a 2021 Czech comedy film by director Patrik Hartl. It is an adaptation of Hartl's novel by the same name.

== Cast ==
- Martin Pechlát as Element
- David Švehlík as Shampoo
- Hynek Čermák as Dot
- Martin Hofmann as Karel
- Zuzana Norisová as Lubica
- Daniela Kolářová as Dot's mother
- Jana Kolesárová as Klára
- Kristýna Boková as Saša
- Barbora Poláková as Shampoo's assistant
- Petra Polnišová as Jarmila
- Martina Hekerová as Vitamine miss
- Hana Vagnerová as Karolína
- Martin Sitta as Dot's colleague
- Eva Josefíková as Secretary in Karel's company
- Tomáš Maštalír as Max
- Ľuboš Kostelný as Gába
