= List of Comeback episodes =

This following is an episode list for the Czech sitcom Comeback, which premiered on TV Nova on 4 September 2008.

== Season 1 ==
#	Title	Premiere	Directed by
1	Křeslo (Chair)	4 September 2008	Jaroslav Fuit
2	Gott ex machina (Gott ex machina)	11 September 2008	Jaroslav Fuit
3	Souboj titánů (Clash of the Titans)	18 September 2008	Petr Fišer
4	Pomáhat a chránit (To Protect and Serve)	25 September 2008	Petr Fišer
5	Pravidla rodinného provozzu (Family Rulezz)	2 October 2008	Petr Fišer
6	Je jaro... (It's Spring...)	9 October 2008	Petr Fišer
7	Lupiči (Robbers)	16 October 2008	Petr Fišer
8	Zdravý a nemocný (Healthy and Ill)	23 October 2008	Petr Fišer
9	Modelka (Model)	30 October 2008	Jaroslav Fuit
10	Lexa a porno (Lexa and Porn)	6 November 2008	Jaroslav Fuit
11	Giganti (Gigants)	13 November 2008	Jaroslav Fuit
12	Zlatá rybka (Goldfish)	20 November 2008	Petr Fišer
13	Sliby chyby (Fine Words Butter No Parsnips)	27 November 2008	Petr Fišer
14	Simonina volba (Simona's choice)	4 December 2008	Jiří Diarmaid Novák
15	Taneční (Ball)	11 December 2008	Petr Fišer
16	Heavy Christmas (Heavy Christmas)	18 December 2008	Jiří Diarmaid Novák
17	Jmenuje se Dagmar! (Her Name Is Dagmar!)	4 March 2009	Jiří Diarmaid Novák
18	CzechSteh (CzechStitch (Word CzechSteh sounds similar to word CzechTech, which is an illegal Techno party))	11 March 2009	Petr Fišer
19	Mrtvý muž (Dead Man)	18 March 2009	Jaroslav Fuit
20	Berňák (Tax Office)	25 March 2009	Petr Fišer
21	Scrabble trable (Scrabble Trouble)	8 April 2009	Jaroslav Fuit
22	Koprovka (Dill Sauce)	15 April 2009	Petr Fišer
23	Narozzeniny (Birthdayzz)	22 April 2009	Petr Fišer
24	Rozzvod (Divorzze)	6 May 2009	Petr Fišer
25	Prohozz (Exzzchange)	13 May 2009	Jaroslav Fuit
26	Těžká hodina (Difficult Hour)	20 May 2009	Jiří Diarmaid Novák
27	Pan Prase odchází (Mr. Pig is Leaving)	27 May 2009	Jiří Diarmaid Novák
28	Absťák (Abstinence)	3 June 2009	Jiří Diarmaid Novák
29	Krev, pop a slzy (Blood, Pop and Tears)	10 June 2009	Jiří Diarmaid Novák
30	Boží mlýny (God's Mills)	17 June 2009	Petr Fišer

== Season 2 ==
#	Title	Premiere	Directed by
31	Změna je pivo (Change is Beer)	3 March 2010	Jiří Diarmaid Novák
32	Děvečka z Lidečka (Girl from Lidečko)	10 March 2010	Jiří Diarmaid Novák
33	Komu zvoní hrany (For Whom the Bells Toll)	17 March 2010	Jiří Diarmaid Novák
34	Zlatá ledvina (Golden Kidney)	24 March 2010	Jiří Diarmaid Novák
35	Boží frisbee (Godly Frisbee)	31 March 2010	Jiří Diarmaid Novák
36	Cesta do Vtelna (Journey to Vtelno)	7 April 2010	Jiří Diarmaid Novák
37	Sbohem, Káhiro! (Goodbye, Cairo!)	14 April 2010	Jiří Diarmaid Novák
38	Bejk (Bull)	21 April 2010	Jiří Diarmaid Novák
39	Křik kormorána (Shout of Cormorant)	16 June 2010	Jiří Diarmaid Novák
40	Třinácté pivo (Thirteenth Beer)	6 April 2011	Jan Novák
41	Bez kláves neodejdu (I'm Not Leaving without Keyboard!)	13 April 2011	Jan Novák
42	Let mouchy (Flight of the Fly)	20 April 2011	Jan Novák
43	Obraz paní Rybkové (Painting of Mrs. Rybková)	27 April 2011	Jan Novák
44	Zabijačka (Feast)	5 September 2011	Jiří Diarmaid Novák
45	Sulc (Jelly)	12 September 2011	Jiří Diarmaid Novák
46	Holter (Holter)	19 September 2011	Jan Novák
47	Strakonický bubák (Strakonice's Bugaboo (Parody of the theatre play Strakonice's Bugpiper))	26 September 2011	Jan Novák
48	Havárie (Crash)	3 October 2011	Jan Novák
49	Francouzská restaurace (French Restaurant)	10 October 2011	Jiří Diarmaid Novák
50	Snad to výjde příště (Maybe You'll Win Next Time)	17 October 2011	Jiří Diarmaid Novák
51	Slepák (Appendixus)	24 October 2011	Jiří Diarmaid Novák
