= Taková normální rodinka (film) =

2008 Czech comedy film

Taková normální rodinka (film) is a Czech comedy film. It was released in 2008.

== Cast ==
- Eva Holubová as Hanáková
- Jaromír Dulava as Hanák
- Monika Zoubková as Kateřina
- Jiří Mádl as Zdeněk
- Ivana Chýlková as Zdeňkova matka
- Luboš Kostelný as Petr
- Vanda Hybnerová as Pavla
- Lillian Malkina as Babička
- Adam Mišík as Raubíř Pavel
- Štěpán Krtička as Raubíř Petr
- Marián Labuda as Poštolka
