= Ro(c)k Podvraťáků (video game) =

2006 video game

- Developer(s): Centauri Production
- Release: 2006

Ro(c)k Podvraťáků is a 2006 Czech video game by Centauri Production, based on the film of the same name.

== Production ==
While in the Western world it was common to have video game tie-ins to a film, this was the first time this trend was followed in the domestic Czech market. The development team had some input from the filmmakers, in terms of ensuring the enemies are the same in both mediums.

== Plot and gameplay ==
The game narrative revolves around a group of four guys called "Podvržáci" who form a rock band. In order to climb the charts, they get involved with the mafia. When things go wrong, they need to fix the damage they've caused.

The gameplay mainly consists of driving and shooting mechanics.

== Critical reception ==
The game has received largely negative reviews. The average rating in Czech media is 32%.

Hrej.cz panned all aspects of the game, including its concept, graphics, physical engine, and music. Bonusweb.cz praised the voice acting and musical accompaniments. Sector.sk wrote that the game was "torturous commercial shit, accompanying perhaps a similarly wretched movie". Tiscali.cz found themselves asking whether the developers had made the game in earnest or if they had deliberately made a bad game for comic effect.
