= Attention, Turtle! =

1970 film

- Russian poster
- Russian: Внимание, черепаха!
- Directed by: Rolan Bykov
- Written by: Semyon Lungin; Ilya Nusinov
- Starring: Alexei Yershov; Andrei Samotolkin; Mikhail Martirosyan; Galina Budanova; Yelena Ryabukhina; Galina Verbitskaya
- Cinematography: Anatoliy Mukasey
- Edited by: Yelena Surazhskaya
- Music by: Andrei Petrov
- Production company: Mosfilm
- Release date: 1970
- Running time: 86 minutes
- Country: Soviet Union
- Language: Russian

Attention, Turtle! (Russian: Внимание, черепаха!, romanized: Vnimanie, cherepakha!) is a 1970 Soviet comedy film directed by Rolan Bykov.

== Plot ==
Two schoolchildren decide to conduct an experiment on a turtle. They want to put it under the tank. But their classmate named Tanya will do everything possible to prevent them.

== Cast ==
- Alexei Yershov as Vova Vasilyev
- Andrei Samotolkin as Vova Didenko
- Mikhail Martirosyan as Vova Manukyan
- Galina Budanova as Tanya Samokhina
- Yelena Ryabukhina as Ella
- Galina Verbitskaya as Bella
- Maryana Smirnova as Katya Egorova
- Aleksey Batalov as Tanya's grandfather
- Iren Azer as Anna Sergeevna the Teacher
- Lillian Malkina as Vova Vasilyev's grandmother
- Zoya Fyodorova as Viktoria Mikhailovna
- Rina Zelyonaya as scientific secretary
- Rolan Bykov as Vova Didenko's grandmother (uncredited)
- Aleksandr Filippenko as tank commander
- Nina Maslova as primary school teacher
