= The Good Plumber =

2016 Czech comedy film

- Directed by: Tomáš Vorel
- Written by: Tomáš Vorel, Baru Vlčková
- Produced by: Petra Švecová
- Starring: Jakub Kohák; Eva Holubová
- Cinematography: Tomáš Vorel
- Music by: David Hlaváč; Barbora Poláková; Jan P. Muchow
- Release date: 6 October 2016
- Running time: 82 minutes
- Country: Czech Republic
- Language: Czech

The Good Plumber (Czech: Instalatér z Tuchlovic) is a 2016 Czech comedy film written and directed by Tomáš Vorel.

== Plot ==
Plumber Luboš repairs everything but finds it difficult to cope with everyday life without the help of his mother.

== Cast and characters ==
- Jakub Kohák as Luboš Cafourek
- Eva Holubová as Luboš's mother
- Petra Špalková as Sýkorová
- Filip Blažek as Sýkora
- Jan Budař as Radek
