= Brutus (Czech band) =

Czech rock band

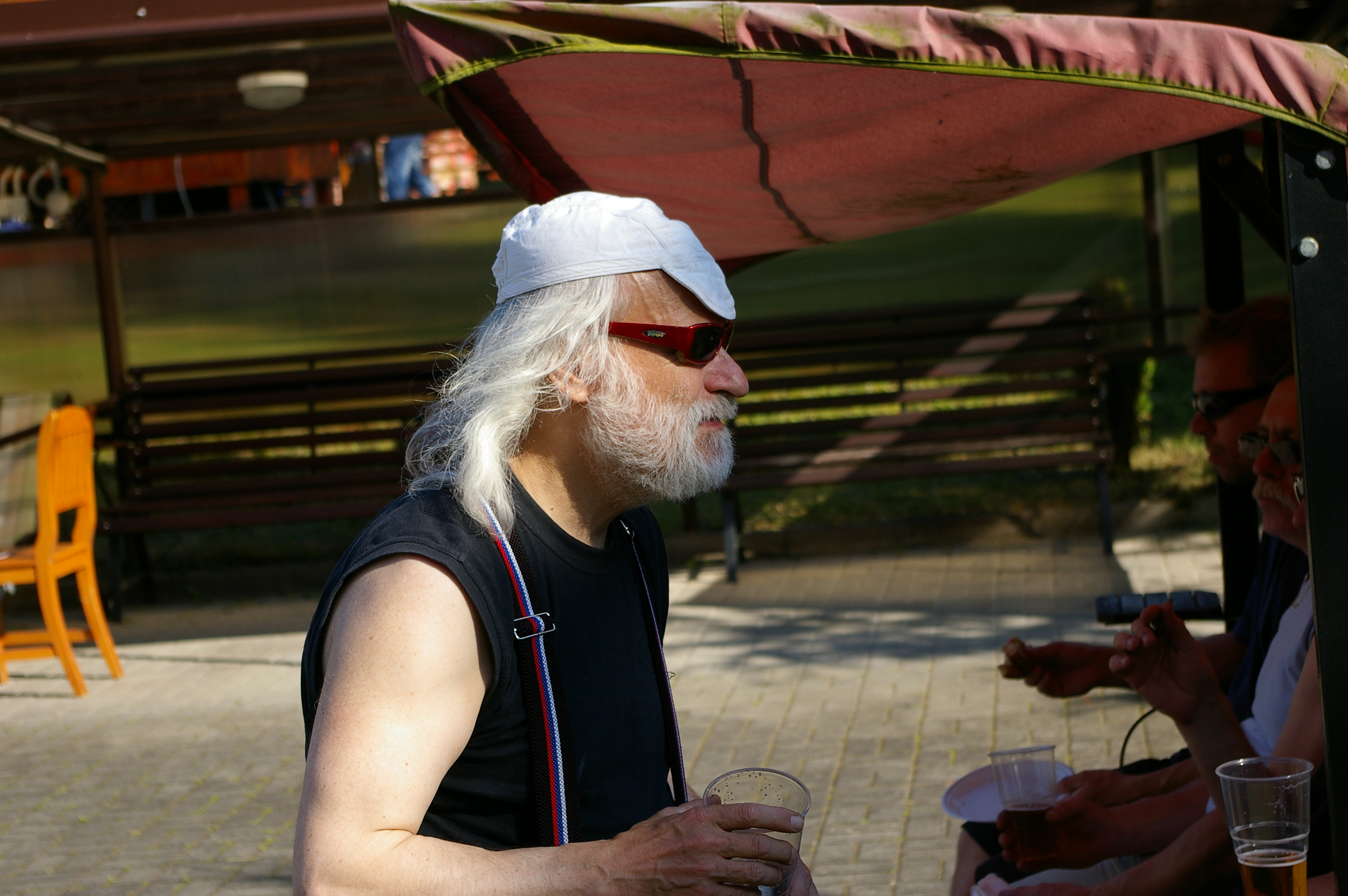
- Alexander "Sáša" Pleska of Brutus, 2012

Background information
- Also known as: Mandragora; Elektronik; Kyklop
- Origin: Rakovník, Czechoslovakia
- Genres: Rock; beat; rock and roll; hard rock; proto-punk; reggae
- Years active: 1967–present
- Label: EMI
- Members: Vladimír Hasal; Alexander Pleska; Michal Čerman; Jan Prokop; Pavel Fišar; Václav Trlica; Jan Bitman; Milan Křížanovský; František Matějovský; Zbyněk Šlajchrt; Jan Nový
- Website: brutus.cz

Brutus is a Czech rock band founded in 1967. They call their style "true bigbeat" (the Czech word bigbeat is different from the English use, and is more or less connected with 1960s rock and roll).

== History ==
Brutus was established in 1967 under the name Mandragora in Rakovník. Its original members were Vlastimil Beneš, Libor Laun, Michal Pleska, Miloslav Černý, Zdeněk Havelka, Vladimír Lankaš, Václav Matějka, Ivan Mikšovic, Jindřich Průcha, Zdeněk Steidl, and Milan Tyburec. In 1973, their performances were banned by the Communist government and they started playing under the name Elektronik. The name was changed to Brutus in 1980 and there was a period (1982–1989) when they had to play as Kyklop. Since the Velvet Revolution in 1989, the band has again been called Brutus. They have played with UK Subs, TV Smith, Suzi Quatro, Dr. Feelgood, Zóna A, and No Name. They have also collaborated with The Vibrators. The group appeared in the 1995 movie Indiánské léto by Saša Gedeon and the 2008 sitcom Comeback.

As of 2020, Brutus has had forty-nine members throughout its history.

== Band members ==
Current members

- Vladimír Hasal – drums, vocals
- Alexander "Sáša" Pleska – vocals, keyboards, harmonica
- Michal Čerman – vocals
- Jan Prokop – vocals
- Pavel Fišar – drums
- Václav Trlica – guitar
- Jan Bitman – bass
- Milan Křížanovský – bass, vocals
- František Matějovský – saxophone, flute, vocals
- Zbyněk Šlajchrt – saxophone
- Jan Nový – saxophone

Founding members

- Vlastimil Beneš – bass, vocals
- Libor Laun – drums, vocals
- Michal Pleska – guitar, trumpet, vocals
- Miloslav Černý – guitar, harmonica, flute
- Zdeněk Havelka – guitar, vocals
- Vladimír Lankaš – guitar
- Václav Matějka – drums
- Ivan Mikšovic – guitar
- Jindřich Průcha – guitar
- Zdeněk Steidl – vocals
- Milan Tyburec – bass, vocals

== Discography ==
Studio albums

- Třikrát denně akt (1991)
- Mám horečku (1992)
- Celý večer rock and roll (1994)
- Gorila (1995)
- Deme na to (1998)
- Dík za číslo (2005)
- To samozřejmě můžeš (2008)

Live albums

- Somráci - Live (1993)
- 2011-05-28 Plasy (2011)

Compilations

- Best of Brutus (1997)
- Alko alkohol- Pozdní sběr 1999 (2009)

DVDs

- Alko alkohol- Pozdní sběr 1999 (2009)
- Brutus živě a nahlas (2017)
