= Wasteland (Czech TV series) =

Czech television series

- Created by: Štěpán Hulík
- Directed by: Alice Nellis; Ivan Zachariáš
- Starring: Zuzana Stivínová; Jaroslav Dušek; Eva Holubová; Petra Špalková
- Music by: David Boulter
- Country of origin: Czech Republic
- No. of episodes: 8

Production
- Running time: 60 minutes

Original release
- Network: HBO Europe
- Release: October 2016

Wasteland (Czech: Pustina) is a Czech television series, which premiered in October 2016 on HBO Europe. Created by Štěpán Hulík, the series stars Zuzana Stivinova as the mayor of a small Czech town which is being bought up and razed by a coal mining company, leading to conflict between residents who want to preserve their traditional life and those who want to take the money and build a better life elsewhere. She loses a referendum allowing the mine to expand, in contravention of a 1991 law limiting brown coal mining in North Bohemia. At the same time, her daughter disappears, and what appears to be an attempt to silence her opposition to the coal mines suggests even deeper layers of political intrigue.

Filming locations include Jezeří Chateau, an historic site almost entirely surrounded by surface mines.

The cast also includes Jaroslav Dušek, Zuzana Stivínová, Eva Holubová and Petra Špalková. Ivan Zachariáš, the Czech-born director, chose to cast amateurs alongside the professional actors, in order to heighten the eight-part series' realism.

The first two episodes of the series had an advance screening at the Karlovy Vary International Film Festival in July 2016, and in the Primetime program at the 2016 Toronto International Film Festival.

== Cast ==
- Zuzana Stivínová jr. as Mayor Hana Sikorová, Míša's mother
- Jaroslav Dušek as Karel Sikora, Hana's ex-husband and father of Míša
- Eliška Křenková as Klára Sikorová, Míša's sister
- Leoš Noha as Kpt. Václav Rajner, investigator
- Jan Cina as Lukáš „Šary“ Vašíček, Klára's boyfriend
- Štěpán Benoni as Adam Vašíček
- Oskar Hes as Filip Paskowski
- Eva Holubová as Vašíčková
- Miroslav Vladyka as Vašíček
- Martin Sitta as Pavel Abrham
- Petra Špalková as Markéta Masařová
- Štěpán Matejíčka as Jakub Masař
- Kateřina Pindejová as Abramová
- Martin Kubačák as František Cetkovský
- Ivan Krúpa as Petr Krušina
- Adam Petrlík as Dejv
- Janek Gregor as Tibor Balog
- Jan Bavala as Sysel
- Mário Pech as Horváth
- Maxmilián Mráz as Kučera
- Richard Stanke as Kwiatkowski
- Adrian Jastraban as Filip's father
- Pavel Rudolf Plasche as taxi driver

== Awards ==
- Trilobit 2017
- Czech Lion Awards 2017
- Czech Film Critics' Awards 2017
