= Štěpán Krtička =

Czech film and television child actor (born 1996)

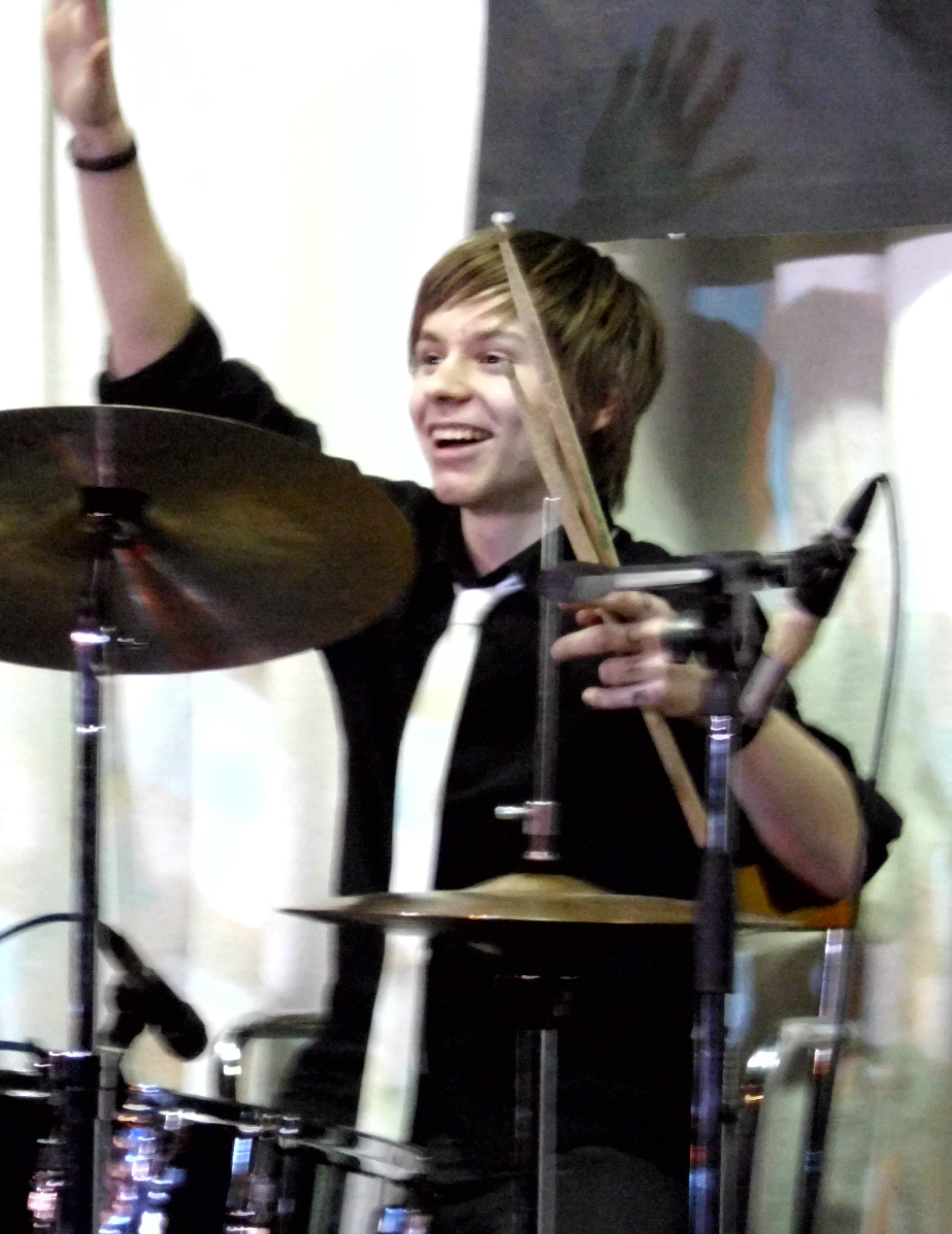
- Štěpán Krtička as drummer on February 1, 2011 in Rock Café Prague
- Born: 19 March 1996 (age 30); Prague, Czech Republic
- Other name: Pothead
- Occupation: Actor
- Years active: 2000–present
- Known for: Dubbing

Štěpán Krtička (born March 19, 1996, in Prague) is a Czech film and television child actor.

He dubs films, series and PC games into Czech. Since 2008 he plays the drums with indie rock band The Colorblinds.

== Filmography ==
- Past na Ježíška (2006) TV .... Vašek
- O dívce, která šlápla na chléb (2007) TV .... Bláťucha
- Světla pasáže (2007) TV series
- Dítě hvězdy (2007) (fairy story)
- Taková normální rodinka (2008) .... raubíř Petr
- Little Knights Tale (2009) TV film and series .... Michal
- Dům U Zlatého úsvitu (2009) TV .... Ondra Pučalík

== Dubbing (selection) ==
Film

- 2004 Bambi .... Young Flower (Stan Alexander)
- 2005 Tarzan II .... Tarzan (Harrison Chad)
- 2006 Brother Bear 2 .... bear Koda (Jeremy Suarez)
- 2007 The Princess and the Pea (2002)
- 2008 Hancock .... Aaron (Jae Head)
- 2008 Whisper (2007) .... David Sandborn (Blake Woodruff)
- 2008 The Nanny Diaries .... Grayer Addison X (Nicholas Art)
- 2009 The Day the Earth Stood Still .... Jacob Benson (Jaden Smith)
- 2009 Little Hercules in 3-D .... Curtis (Marc John Jefferies)
- 2009 Young Andersen .... Tuk (Mikkel Konyher)
- 2009 Shark Bait (2006)
- 2010 Karla og Katrine (2009)
- 2010 Come into the Light (Italy, 2005) .... Saro (Mario Giunta)
- 2010 Gruesome School Trip (2005) .... Gino (Jim van der Panne)
- 2010 Pokémon: Destiny Deoxys (2004) .... Ash Ketchum
- 2010 Felix: The Toy Rabbit and the Time Machine (2005)
- 2011 Bambi II (2006) .... Flower, Ronno (Nicky Jones, Anthony Ghannam)

Series

- 2006–2008 Desperate Housewives (season 1–4) .... Porter Scavo (Shane Kinsman)
- 2007–2008 Roman Mysteries (season 1–2) .... Jonathan Ben-Mordechai (Eli Machover)
- 2008 Animalia .... Alex (Brooke Mikey Anderson)
- 2010 The Mystery of Black Rose Castle (2001) .... Bobby (Travis Kisgen)
- 2011 Shake It Up .... Ty Blue (Roshon Fegan)
