= Predrag Bjelac =

Serbian actor (born 1962)

- Предраг Бјелац
- Born: 30 June 1962 (age 63); Belgrade, PR Serbia, FPR Yugoslavia
- Occupation: Actor

Predrag Bjelac (Serbian Cyrillic: Предраг Бјелац; born 30 June 1962) is a Serbian actor. He portrayed Igor Karkaroff in Harry Potter and the Goblet of Fire and Lord Donnon in The Chronicles of Narnia: Prince Caspian. He is a graduate of the University of Arts in Belgrade Faculty of Dramatic Arts, class of 1986, and studied at The Lee Strasberg Theatre Institute (1988) in New York City.

== Filmography ==
=== Film ===
- Šest dana juna (1985) - Petar
- Destroying Angel (1987) - Otto
- Poslednja priča (1987, TV Movie) - Vlada
- The Fall of Rock and Roll (1989)
- Čudna noć (1990)
- Stand by (1991) - Veliki
- Harrison's Flowers (2000) - Doctor in Vukovar
- The Final Victim (2003) - Simons
- Eurotrip (2004) - Italian Guy at Vatican
- Kad porastem biću kengur (2004) - Baron
- Harry Potter and the Goblet of Fire (2005) - Igor Karkaroff
- Amor Fati (2005, Short) - Branko
- The Omen (2006) - Vatican Observatory Priest
- Ro(c)k podvraťáků (2006) - Chřestýš
- The Chronicles of Narnia: Prince Caspian (2007) - Lord Donnon
- Ať žijí rytíři! (2009) - Ahmed (Movie cut)
- Harry Potter and the Half-Blood Prince (2009) - Igor Karkaroff (uncredited; appears in flashback)
- Kao rani mraz (2010) - Stari Nikola
- Sasha (2010) - Vlado Petrovic
- Czech-Made Man (2011) - Noha
- AS PIK (2012)
- Artiljero (2012) - Gane
- Ironclad: Battle for Blood (2014) - Maddog
- Horseplay (2014) - Gypsy King
- Child 44 (2015) - Basurov
- Gangster Ka (2015) - Dardan
- DxM (2015) - Mosca
- Winnetou & Old Shatterhand (2016) - Tangua
- Winnetou - Der letzte Kampf (2016) - Tangua
- Intrigo: Dear Agnes (2019) - Caretaker
- Atatürk 1881-1919 (2023) - Otto Liman von Sanders

=== Television ===
- Warriors (1999) - Naser Zec
- The Immortal: Deja vu (2001) - Petr
- Children of Dune (2003) - Namri
- Spooks (a.k.a. MI-5) (2007) - Edik Kuznetzov
- The Fixer (2008) - Tarek Sokoli
- Dobrá čtvrť (2008) - Dragan
- The Courier 2.0 (2008) - Valentine
- Ať žijí rytíři! (2010) - Ahmed
- 4-teens (2011) - Uncle Dragan
- Borgia (2011-2014) - Francesco Piccolomini
- Cirkus Bukowsky (2013-2014) - Luka Coltello
- Případy 1. oddělení (2014) - Abikal
- Genius (2017) - Milos Maric
- Killing Eve (2020) - Grigoriy
