= Kouř =

1991 Czech comedy film

- Directed by: Tomáš Vorel
- Written by: Lumír Tuček; Tomáš Vorel
- Starring: Jan Slovák; Lucie Zedníčková
- Cinematography: Martin Duba
- Edited by: Jiří Brožek
- Music by: Michal Vích
- Distributed by: Národní filmový archiv
- Release date: 1 February 1991
- Running time: 89 minutes
- Country: Czechoslovakia
- Language: Czech

Kouř is a Czech comedy film directed by Tomáš Vorel.

== Cast ==
- Jan Slovák - Miroslav Čáp
- Lucie Zedníčková - Kotě
- Jaroslav Dušek - Karel Šmíd
- Jiří Fero Burda - Béďa
- Martin Faltýn - Glosner
- Šimon Caban - Arnoštek
- Eva Holubová - Liduška Běhalová

== Plot ==
A young engineer, Mirek, arrives at a village factory to apply for a vacant position, and is tasked with designing a system that would reduce the polluting emissions from the factory. However, his initial enthusiasm for work is in stark contrast to the existing morale among the other staff.

Mirek falls in love with Kotě, the daughter of the stoker Křížek, a former engineer who had previously invented a system to reduce emissions that was rejected by the factory management. Mirek obtains Křížek's original project, and discovers that it is a work of genius. However, he is obstructed in his work to revive the plan by his line manager, Šmíd, who successfully blocked the previous project. Mirek and Kotě finally go to bed together after a company party, at which point Kotě informs Mirek that she is going away and they will never see each other again.

The next day at work, after the death of the factory director, the project to reduce emissions is discussed. Mirek hands over Křižek's project to the factory management, which is completely dismissed by Šmíd, who demands Mirek's dismissal. After Šmíd's verbal attack on Liduška Běhalová, Mirek attacks Šmíd, and kills him. Meanwhile, there is a demonstration at the factory demanding change. When the protesters reach the boardroom, Křížek is accepted as manager of the company.
