= Účastníci zájezdu =

2006 Czech comedy film

- Directed by: Jiří Vejdělek
- Written by: Michal Viewegh, Jiří Vejdělek
- Produced by: Rudolf Biermann; Tomáš Hoffman
- Starring: Anna Polívková, Eva Holubová, Martin Pechlát
- Cinematography: Jakub Šimůnek
- Edited by: Jan Daňhel
- Music by: Oskar Petr
- Distributed by: Falcon
- Release date: 20 April 2006
- Running time: 113 minutes
- Country: Czech Republic
- Language: Czech

Účastníci zájezdu (Holiday Makers) is a Czech comedy film based on the 1996 novel Účastníci zájezdu (The Sightseers) by Michal Viewegh. It was released in 2006.

== Cast ==
- David Hlaváč - Roko
- Šárka Opršálová - Irma
- Miroslav Krobot - Karel (older)
- Pavel Liška - Karel (younger)
- Eva Leinweberová - Jituš
- Anna Polívková - Jolana
- Eva Holubová - Jolana's mother
- Bohumil Klepl - Jolana's father
- Jana Štěpánková - Helga
- Jitka Kocurová - Pamela
- Kristýna Leichtová - Denisa
- Martin Pechlát - Vladimír
- Martin Sitta - Jarda
- Jaromír Nosek - Ignác
- Ondrej Kovaľ - Max
