= The Don Juans =

2013 film by Jiří Menzel

- Directed by: Jiří Menzel
- Written by: Jiří Menzel; Tereza Brdečková
- Produced by: Adrian Sarbu
- Starring: Jan Hartl
- Cinematography: Jaromír Šofr
- Edited by: Jiří Brožek
- Music by: Aleš Březina
- Distributed by: Bontonfilm
- Release dates: 27 August 2013 (Montreal IFF); 26 September 2013 (Czech Republic)
- Running time: 102 minutes
- Country: Czech Republic
- Language: Czech

The Don Juans (Czech: Donšajni, also known as Skirt Chasers) is a 2013 Czech comedy film directed by Jiří Menzel. The film was selected as the Czech entry for the Best Foreign Language Film at the 86th Academy Awards, but it was not nominated. Originally Agnieszka Holland's mini-series Burning Bush had been selected to represent the Czech Republic. However AMPAS disqualified the film, citing regulations that the film must not have initially appeared on television. The mini-series aired on Czech TV eight months prior to the re-edited version that appeared in cinemas. The Don Juans was a controversial pick as members of the Czech Film Academy did not see the film before it was chosen and because the film was poorly received by Czech critics.

== Cast ==
- Jan Hartl as Vítek
- Libuše Šafránková as Markétka
- Martin Huba as Jakub
- Jiřina Jirásková as Jiřina
- Ivana Chýlková as Adélka
- Jan Jirán as Conductor
- Václav Kopta as Otto
- Eva Josefíková as young Markétka
- Václav Jílek as young Jakub

== See also ==
- List of submissions to the 86th Academy Awards for Best Foreign Language Film
- List of Czech submissions for the Academy Award for Best Foreign Language Film
