= Barbora Poláková =

Czech actress and singer (born 1983)

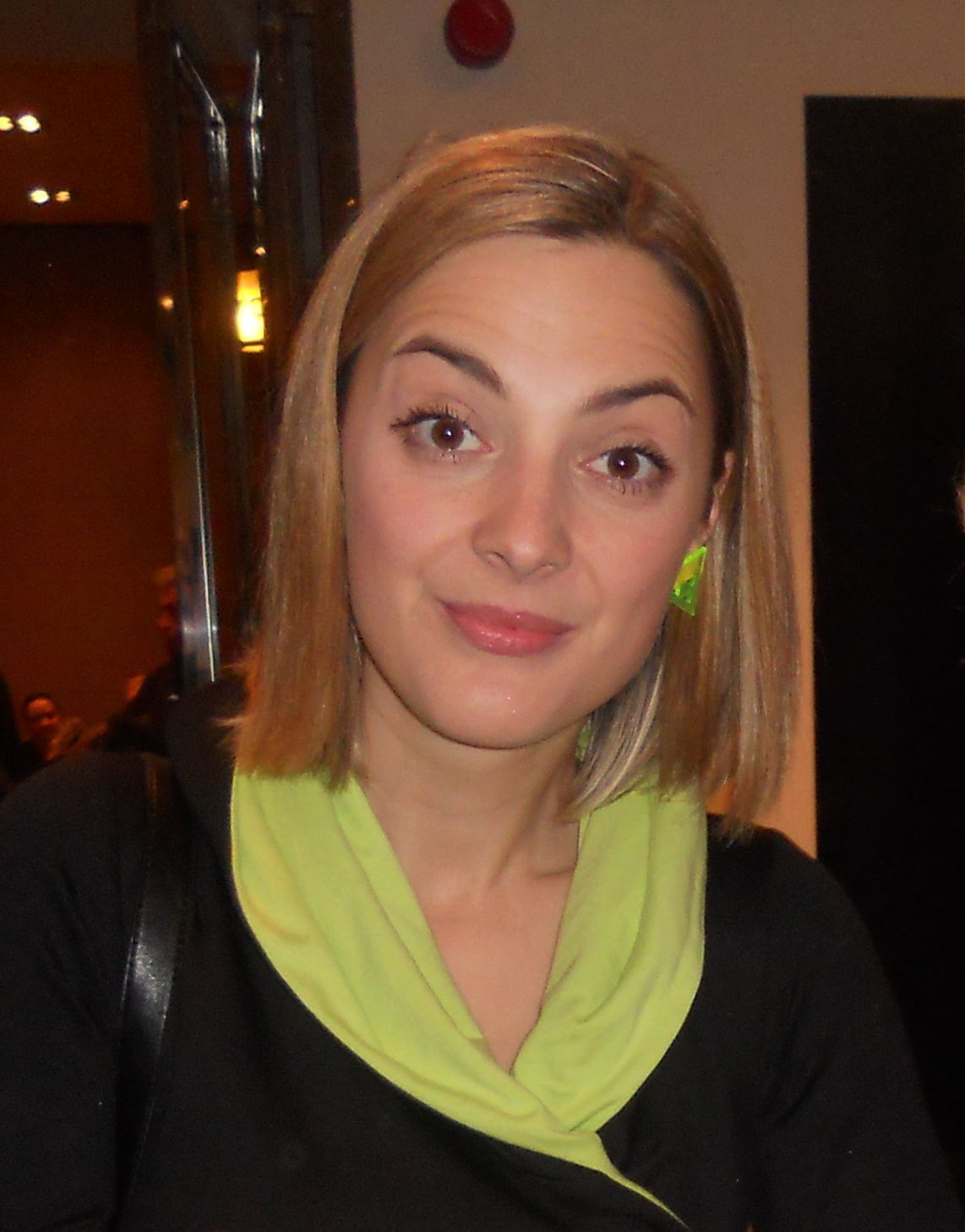
- Barbora Poláková (2011)
- Born: 3 October 1983 (age 42); Kolín, Czechoslovakia
- Occupations: Actress, singer
- Years active: 2005–present
- Website: barborapolakova.com

Barbora Poláková (born 3 October 1983 in Kolín) is a Czech actress and singer.

== Selected filmography ==
=== Films ===
- Kráska v nesnázích (2006)
- Láska z kontejneru (2011)
- Láska je láska (2012)
- Život je život (2015)
- Instalatér z Tuchlovic (2016)
- Bet on Friendship (2021)

=== TV series ===
- Okresní přebor (2010)
- Dokonalý svět (2010)
- Základka (2012)
- Neviditelní (2014)
- Marta a Věra (2014)

== Discography ==
=== Studio albums ===
- Barbora Poláková (2015)
- ZE.MĚ (2018)
- Něhy & Dydjiny (2022)
- On / Off (2023)
- Sršeň (2025)

=== Singles ===
- 2015: Nafrněná
- 2017: Po válce
- 2019: Poď Si (feat. Eva Samková)
- 2020: Polovina
- 2020: Filtr Tour (feat. Marek Adamczyk, Patrik Děrgel, Peter Pecha, David Hlaváč, Marta Kloučková)

== Personal life ==
In 2015, Poláková and her boyfriend, fellow actor Pavel Liška, welcomed a daughter named Ronja. In March 2017, she gave birth to her daughter Rika with the same father. In 2026, Poláková and her boyfriend, musician Štěpán Urban, welcomed a son named František.
