= Marie Málková =

Czech actress

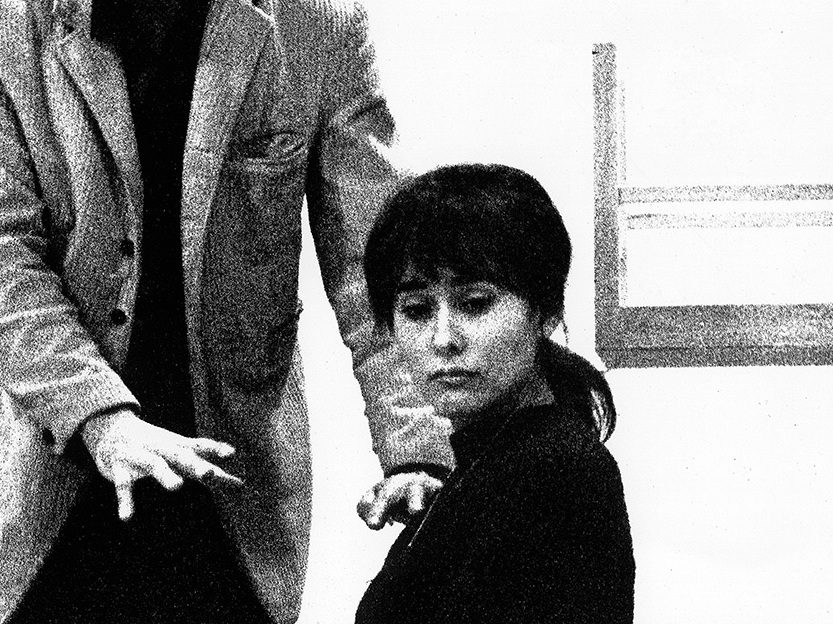
- 1967
- Born: 14 April 1941 (age 83); Vysoké Mýto, Protectorate of Bohemia and Moravia
- Occupation: Actress
- Years active: 1962–2018
- Spouse: Jan Grossman (m. 1925–1993)

Marie Málková (born April 14, 1941 in Vysoké Mýto, Protectorate of Bohemia and Moravia) is a Czech actress.

Interested in music, theater and literature from a young age, she participated in a drama club and national recital competitions. She joined the Academy of Performing Arts at the Theatre on the Balustrade in Prague in 1962 where she remained until 1968, later appearing on stage there from 1992 to 1995. She was married to Jan Grossman (1925-1993), a notable theatre director. Between 1983 and 1992 she worked at the SK Neumann Theatre. On TV she is known for roles such as Svátková in Pojišťovna štěstí (2008-2010) and Christine König / Manuela in Das unsichtbare Visier (1975), and in film has appeared in films such as Kto si bez viny (1963), Chvojka (1970), Dobrý den, město (1976), and as the grandmother in Of Parents and Children (2007). In 2008 she played a firefighter in the sitcom Comeback. Málková won the Alfréd Radok Award for Best Actress for her role in Heldenplatz. She was appointed Associate Professor at the Academy of Performing Arts in 2005.
