= Martina Gasparovič Bezoušková =

Czech actress

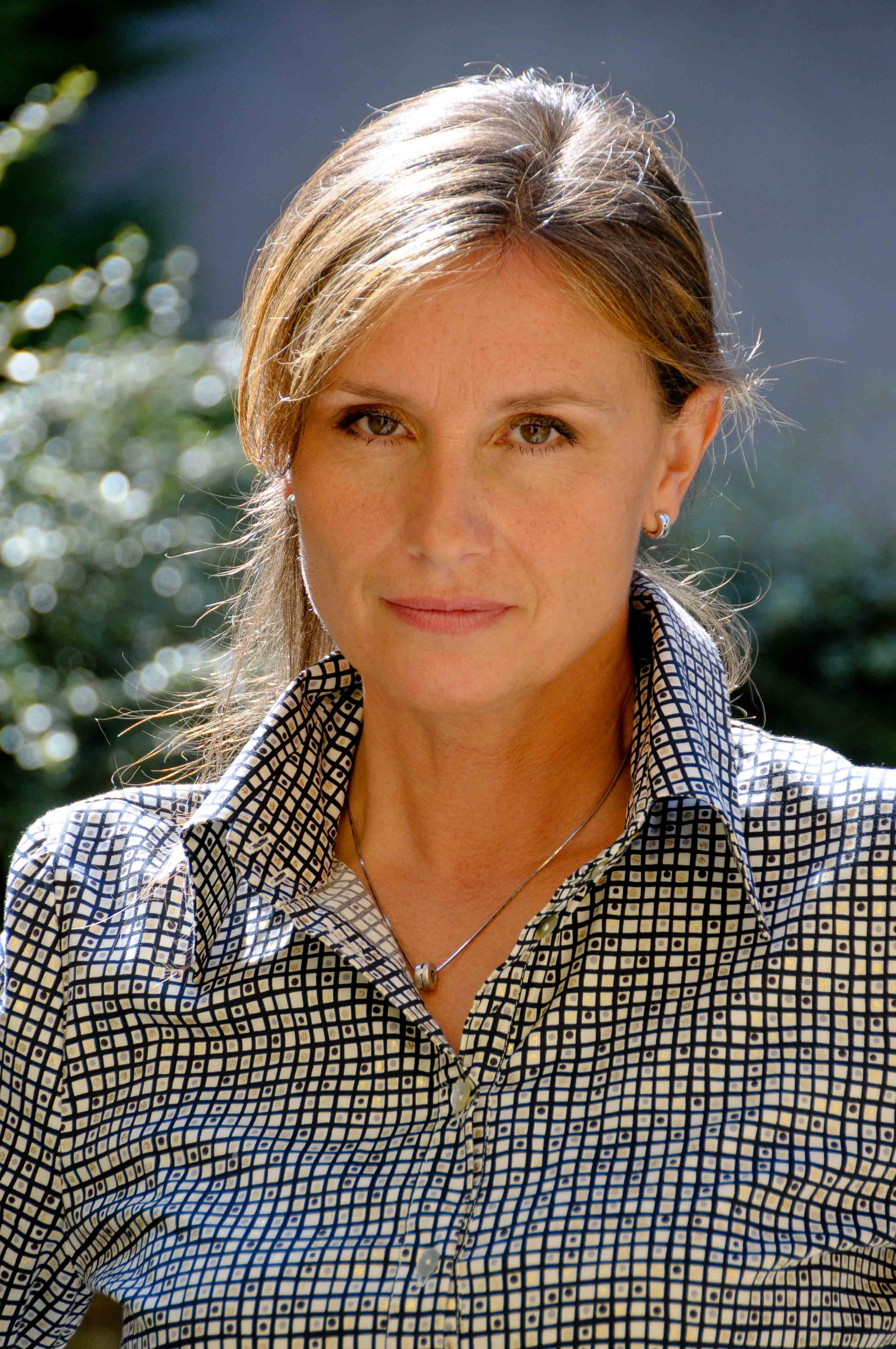
- Martina Gasparovič Bezoušková
- Born: 9 January 1961; Prague, Czechoslovakia (now Czech Republic)
- Occupations: Theatre actress, Teacher
- Years active: 1981 - present

Martina Gasparovič Bezoušková (born 9 January 1961, Prague) is a Czech theatre and film actress and teacher.

== Biography ==
She was born in Malá Strana, Prague, one of four children of the painter Ema Blažková (1924–2003) and Martin Gasparovič (1923–1989). As a young child, she studied classical ballet in the Ballet Preparatory School of the National Theater, tap danced, and sang in the Czech Radio Children's Choir. She later competed in ballroom dancing.

From 1976 to 1980 she studied dental laboratory at the Secondary Medical School in Prague.

After graduation, she was admitted to the Department of Dramatic Theater of the Theatre Faculty of the Academy of Performing Arts (DAMU), from which she graduated in 1984. Her teachers there included Jana Hlaváčová.

Since 2014 she has been teaching stage speech at DAMU. Since 2016, she has been teaching two programs at the Faculty of Arts of Charles University in Prague as part of the "University of the Third Age": Speak or not to speak and The road to success is paved with words. In 2018 she began teaching at the Jan Deyl Conservatory and High School, and also at the Prague International Conservatory.

She has been credited in theatre and film as "Martina Gasparovičová", "Martina Gasparovičová-Bezoušková" or "Martina Bezoušková".

== Family ==
Her husband was Martin Bezouška (born 1955), a Czech screenwriter and dramaturgist. They have four children together.

== Selected filmography ==
- 1982 Na konci diaľnice, name of role: Zuzka, dir. Ján Zeman
- 1983 O statečném kováři, Princezna, Babice, Skřet (princess, scary woman, elf), dir. Petr Švéda
- 1984 Kariéra, gymnastka Miluška (Miluška, the gymnast), dir. Július Matula
- 1984 Kouzelníkův návrat, Jůlinka, dir. Antonín Kachlík
- 1984 Oldřich a Božena, Dívka z družiny Boženy (Girl from the company of Bozena), dir. Otakar Vávra
- 1985 Vlak dětství a naděje, Madona, dir. Karel Kachyňa
- 1986 Mladé víno, Jana, Richardova nová přítelkyně (Richard's new girlfriend), dir. Václav Vorlíček
- 1987 Nejistá sezóna, Fanynka (fans), dir. Ladislav Smoljak
- 1986 Počkej si na bílé štěstí (TV series), Skořepová, dir. Vladimír Blažek
- 1987 O houslích krále snů, Markétka, dir. Věra Jordánová
- 1988 Anděl svádí ďábla, Společnice (companion), dir. Václav Matějka
- 1989 Uzavřený okruh, Karlina kamarádka (friend of Karla), dir. Václav Matějka
- 2000 Kytice, Matka (mother), dir. F. A. Brabec
- 2007 Bestiář, Tetička (auntie), dir. Irena Pavlásková
- 2010 Cesty domů (TV series), Dvořáčková, dir. Jaromír Polišenský, Jiří Adamec
- 2010 Bystroletov, Štererová, dir. Valeri Nikolajev
- 2010 Ze závislosti do nezávislosti, Vrchní sestra (Chief nurse), dir. Alan Lederer
- 2011 V peřině, Zákaznice (Customer), dir. F. A. Brabec
- 2012 Život je ples, Žena z vily Zelenky (Woman from Villa Zelenka), (TV seriál), dir. Petr Slavík
- 2014 Doktoři z Počátků (TV series), Oddávající (Marrying clerk), part Soudy a předsudky, dir. Libor Kodad
- 2014 Vejška, Docentka (associate professor), dir. Tomáš Vorel
- 2015 Doktor Martin (TV series), Doktorka Eda (Dr Eda), dir. Petr Zahrádka
- 2016 Řachanda, Královna (Queen), dir. Marta Ferencová
- 2016 Přistoupili?, Průvodčí (conductor), dir. Tereza Pospíšilová

== Selected theatre roles ==
=== DISK Theatre (1983–1984) ===
- Václav Kliment Klicpera, Každý něco pro vlast (Everybody for homeland), name of role: Minka, dir. Jan Burian
- Thornton Wilder: Naše městečko (Our town), Rebeka Gibbsová (Rebeka Gibbs), dir. Lájos Horváth
- W. Shakespeare: Troilus a Kressida (Troilus and Kressida), Andromache, dir. František Štěpánek
- R. Avermaete: Kravská řež (Cow cut), paní de Fallais (Madame de Fallais), dir. Lájos Horváth
- Josef Čapek, Karel Čapek: Lásky hra osudná (Love game fatal), Isabella, dir. Evžen Němec
- A. Arbuzov: Kruté hry (Cruel games), Ljubasja, dir. Hana Ižofová

=== Švandovo Theatre at Smíchov (former Realistické divadlo) (1982–1985) ===
- Jean Giraudoux: Ondina, Hraběnka Violanta (Countess Violanta), víla (nymph), dir. Luboš Pistorius

=== Viola Theatre (1982–1985) ===
- Eva Kröschlová (úprava): Staročeské vánoční hry (Old Czech Christmas Games), Anděl (Angel), dir. Eva Kröschlová

=== Theatre in Řeznická Street ===
- Princeznina bota (Princess Shoe), Princezna Jasněnka (Jasněna, the Princess), dir. Jan Marek

=== Klicpera Theatre (former DVÚ Hradec Králové) (1984–1985) ===
- Jerome Chodorov: Dva na schodišti (Two on the staircase), dir. Otakar Prajzner
- Václav Tomšovský: Jak se čerti ženili (How the devils got married), dir. František Bahník
- Karel Čapek: Loupežník (Highwayman), Mimi, dir. Jaromír Staněk

=== Jaroslav Průcha Theatre (former Středočeské divadlo Kladno – Mladá Boleslav) (1988–1990) ===
- Leonid Andrejev: Ten, který dostává políčky (The One Who Receives Blows), Consuella, dir. Miloš Horanský
- Carlo Goldoni: Náměstíčko (Square), Gneze, dir. Krystina Taberyová
- Rudyard Kipling: Kniha džungle (The jungle book), Bílý jelen (White deer), dir. Václav Martinec
- F. Vodseďálek: Mojžíš, Princezna Egyptská (Princess of Egypt), dir. Hana Burešová
- Josef Lada: Byl jednou jeden drak (There was once a dragon), Hraběnka Babáčková (Babáčková, the Countess), dir. Karel Brožek
- Aristofanes: Lysistrata, dir. Miloš Horanský
- William Shakespeare: Kupec benátský (The Merchant of Venice), Jessica, Shylockova dcera (Daughter of Shylock), dir. Gerik Císař
- Jean Anouilh: Tomáš Becket (Thomas Becket), dir. Gerik Císař
- Hervé: Mam'zelle Nitouche, Anděl Strážný, Claudine, Důstojník, Klášterní sestra, Tanečnice, (Guardian Angel, Claudine, Officer, Monastery Sister, Dancer), dir. Hana Burešová
