= Gympl =

2007 Czech comedy film

The Can
- Original title: Gympl
- Directed by: Tomáš Vorel
- Written by: Tomáš Houska, Tomáš Vorel, Pavel Nosek
- Produced by: Tomáš Vorel
- Starring: Tomáš Vorel Jr., Jiří Mádl
- Cinematography: Marek Jicha
- Edited by: Filip Issa, Tomáš Vorel
- Music by: Wich, Hugo Toxxx, James Cole,Indy, Tomáš Matonoha
- Distributed by: Falcon
- Release date: 27 September 2007
- Running time: 110 minutes
- Country: Czech Republic
- Language: Czech
- Box office: 49,952,154 CZK

Gympl (lit. 'grammar school') is a Czech comedy film directed by Tomáš Vorel. It was released in 2007.

== Cast ==
- Tomáš Vorel Jr. as Petr Kocourek
- Zuzana Bydžovská as Kocourek's Mother
- Jiří Mádl as Michal Kolman
- Jan Kraus as Kolman's Father
- Ivana Chýlková as Kolman's Mother
- Eva Holubová as Headmistress Mirka
- Tomáš Matonoha as Tomáš, form teacher
- Jiří Schmitzer as Karel, Czech Teacher
- Milan Šteindler as Milan, Physics Teacher
- Martin Zbrozek as Gym Master
- Tomáš Vorel as Janitor
- Lenka Jurošková as Klára Krumbachová
- Martina Procházková as Pavla Malířová
- Tomáš Hanák as Pavla's Father
- Filip Vorel as Jindra
- Tomáš Vaněk as Martin
- Kamila Kikinčuková as Monika
- Daniel Sidon as Punker

== Production ==
It was extremely difficult for the then 16-year-old Lenka Jurošková to undress in front of the camera. "When director Vorel called me for the role, it was one of my happiest moments. A great opportunity, even with scenes that weren't easy for me," she admitted.
