= Petra Špalková =

Czech actress

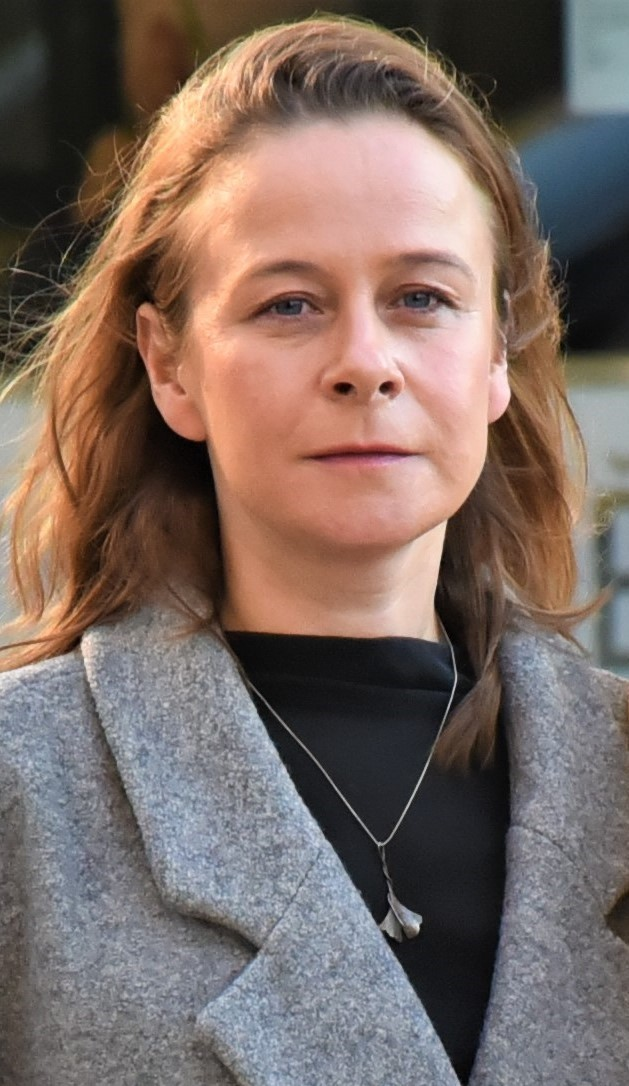
- Born: 21 February 1975 (age 51); Brno, Czechoslovakia
- Education: Faculty of Arts, Charles University
- Occupation: Actress
- Years active: 1980–present
- Spouse: Miloslav Tichý
- Children: Alois (son); Anděla (daughter)
- Website: Czech National Theater

Petra Špalková (born 21 February 1975 in Brno) is a Czech actress. In 1997 she was guest actor at the Divadlo v Dlouhé.

== Filmography ==
=== Film ===
Year	Title	Role	Notes
1993	Big Beat	Kašpar	
1996	Kolya	Paša	
1996	Whisper	Laura	
1998	Dawn	Ingrid	Short film
1999	The State of No Gravity	Zuzana	Short film
1999	The Local News	—N/a	Short film
2001	At Night	—N/a	Short film
2001	Weddings Presents	—N/a	Short film
2001	Autumn Spring	Králová	
2002	The Brats	Monika Šírová, mother	
2003	The Old Tomcat	—N/a	Short film
2004	Stag Party	Věra	
2004	Lovers & Murderers	Jolana Tušlová	
2005	Shadows of the Deceased	—N/a	Also known as Bonds of Blood
2005	The City of the Sun	Marta	Also known as Working Class Heroes
2006	Marta	Title role	
2007	Václav	Majka	
2012	My Naked Diary	Sába, stepmother	
2013	Like Never Before	Karla	
2015	Red Library	—N/a	Originally titled Eldorádo, in pre-production
2016	The Good Plumber	Sýkorová	
2017	Ice Mother	Věra	
2017	Po strništi bos	aunt	
2018	Pepa	Zdena Nováková, Pepa's wife	
2018	Short Cut	mother	
2020	Shadow Country	—N/a	Originally titled Krajina ve stínu

=== Television ===
Year	Title	Role	Notes
1993	Czech Soda	—N/a	TV show, unknown episode(s)
1999	Certainty	Neighbor	
1999	Life at the Castle	Mirka	Series, season 3 (1999–2000), 4 episodes
2001	The Gone Wild Country	Jana	Series, season 2, 3 and 4 (2001–2012), 4 episodes
2003	Thou Art the Man	—N/a	
2005	The Street	—N/a	Series, unknown episode(s)
2006	The Heather Throne	Blažena, castle lady	
2006	Airport	Lucie Jumblattová	Series, season 1 and 2 (2006–2007), 56 episodes
2007	Policeman's Humoresque	Božena	Series, season 3, episode: "Inheritor"
2008	To Farewell	—N/a	
2009	Insomnia	—N/a	
2010	Wonders of Life	—N/a	Series, season 1, 3 episodes
2011	Čapka's Pockets	Ružena Broučková	Series, episode: "The Trial of Mr. Havlena"
2011	Affairs	Dáša Waltrová	Series, episode: "The Lunatic"
2011	The Crime Angel	—N/a	Series, season 2, episode: "The Village Ballad"
2012	Smilings	Herself	Documentary series
2013	White Lies	Maruška	Anthology, episode: "Perfect Work"
2013	Crossing Lines	Child Worker	Series, season 1, episode: "Long-Haul Predators"
2013	Therapy II.	—N/a	Series, unknown episode(s)
2013	Saints Cyril & Methodius – Apostles to the Slavs	—N/a	Miniseries, unknown episode(s)
2014	The Life & Times of the Judge A.K.	LOT officer	Series, episode: "Execution "
2015	American Letters	Anna Dvořáková	
2015	Jan Hus	—N/a	Miniseries, filming
2015	Case Apart	—N/a	In pre-production
2016	Wasteland		
2018	A Pilot Tale	Jarmila Kopečková	

== Awards ==
Year	Nominated work	Award	Category	Result
Stage
1997	The Taming of the Shrew	Thalia Awards	New Drama Actor	Won
1997	The Magic Mountain	Alfréd Radok Awards	New Artist	Won
2000	A Profitable Position	Alfréd Radok Awards	Best Actress	Nominated
Film
2002	The Brats	Czech Lion Awards	Best Actress in a Leading Role	Nominated
2013	Like Never Before	Czech Lion Awards	Best Actress in a Leading Role	Won
2013	Like Never Before	Czech Film Critics Awards	Best Actress in a Leading Role	Won
