= Traps (1998 film) =

Czech comedy-drama film

- Directed by: Věra Chytilová
- Screenplay by: Věra Chytilová; Eva Kacírková; Michal Laznovsky
- Starring: Tomáš Hanák; Miroslav Donutil; Zuzana Stivínová
- Cinematography: Štěpán Kučera
- Edited by: Ivana Kačírková
- Music by: Jiří Chlumecký; Věra Chytilová
- Release date: 1998
- Language: Czech

Traps (Czech: Pasti, pasti, pastičky, lit. 'Trap, Trap, Little Trap') is a 1998 Czech comedy-drama film co-written and directed by Věra Chytilová. It was screened at the 55th Venice International Film Festival.

== Cast ==
- Tomáš Hanák as Petr
- Miroslav Donutil as Josef Dohnal
- Zuzana Stivínová as Lenka
- Milan Lasica as Bach
- Katerina Hajna as Ingrid
- Eva Holubová as Anna
- Lubos Svoboda as Michal
- Daniela Trebicka as Dohnal’s wife
- Karel Roden as Dr. Marek
- Lucie Vackárová as Bibina
- Dagmar Bláhová as the chef
- David Vávra as Pavel

== Production ==
The film was shot in Prague and its surroundings.

== Release ==
The film was released on 16 April 1998. It was screened in the Prospectives section of the 55th Venice International Film Festival, in which it won the Elvira Notari Prize.

== Reception ==
Alexandra Heller-Nicholas noted how the film "succeeds in its unification of rape and comedy" thanks to its "general unevenness", combining “sombre, dark and wholly sympathetic” tones with physical comedy and old-school slapstick. Variety's critic David Rooney described the filmas one that could have been a comedy classic if it had "faster pacing and tighter cutting", and found "Chytilova's languid storytelling" to be its main liability. Tom Birchenough from The Arts Desk called it "tightly structured", "stark" and "cruelly funny".
