= Martin Preiss =

Czech cinematographer (born 1978)

Martin Preiss (born 18 September 1978) is a Czech cinematographer, writer, director and teacher.

== Life and career ==
Preiss was born in Prague, Czechoslovakia (now Czech Republic). He studied at Film and TV School of the Academy of Performing Arts in Prague (FAMU) and gained a Masters in cinematography in 2008. He is a member of the Czech Society Of Cinematographers (ACK), and was a Member of Presidium of this organisation. He has made a number of feature films, short films and commercials including the 2004 comedy-horror film Choking Hazard, 2008 comedy Grapes, and 2009 comedy Little Knights Tale.

== Awards and nominations ==
- He received the award for Best Cinematography at the California Independent Film Festival in 2010, for A Son's War
- He was nominated for the Golden Tadpole at the 2007 Camerimage International Film Festival and Best technical contribution at the 2008 Qantas Film and Television Awards for his work on the short film Cargo.
- He was nominated for a Czech Society of Cinematographers Award for feature film Little Knights Tale.

== Family ==
He is the nephew of Czech actors Viktor Preiss and Jana Preissová.
