= Martin Písařík =

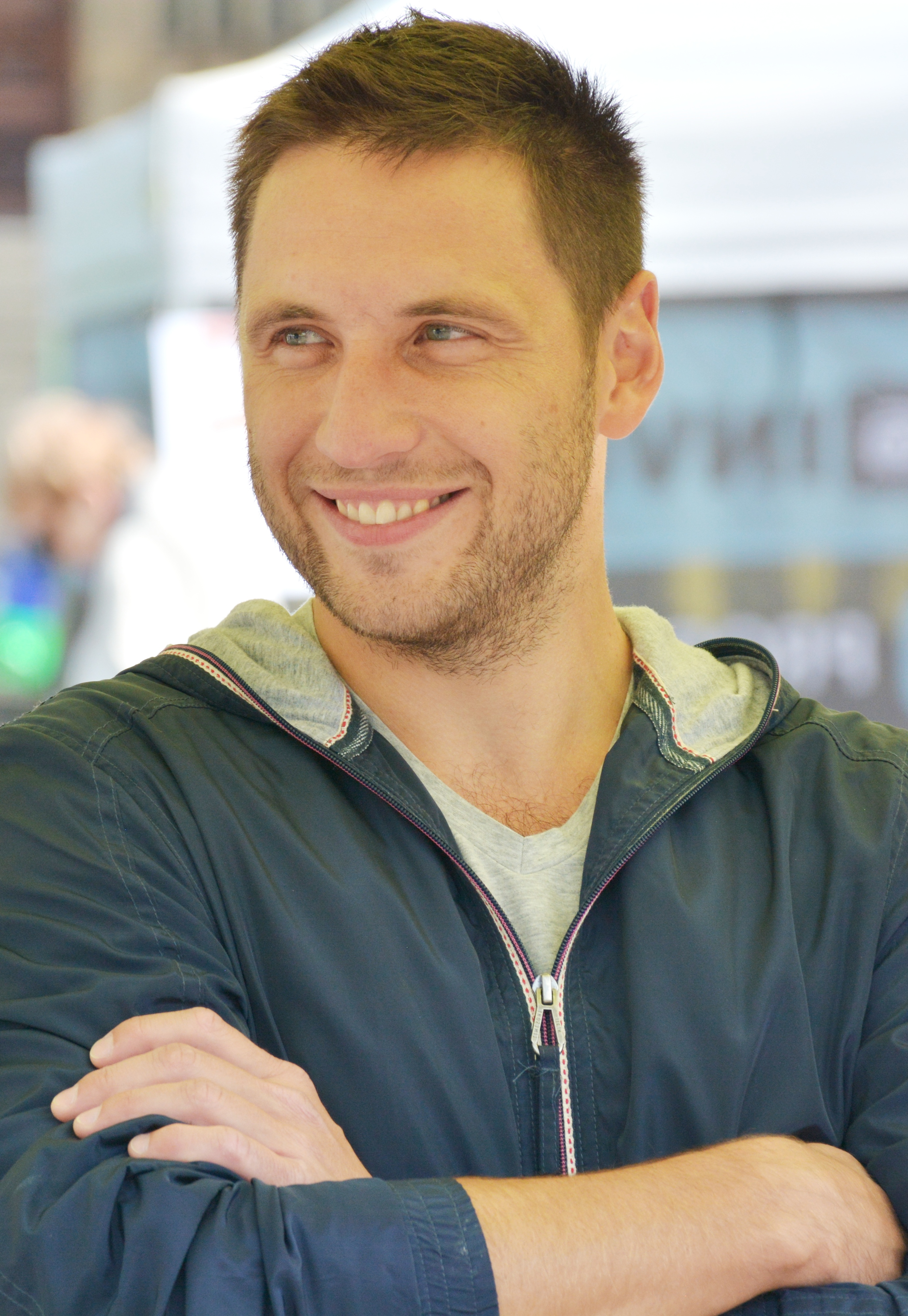
- Martin Písařík (2015)
- Born: 1 July 1979 (age 45); Prague, Czechoslovakia
- Occupation: Actor
- Years active: 1996–present

Martin Písařík (born 1 July 1979 in Prague) is a Czech film, television, stage and voice actor. He studied at the Jaroslav Ježek Conservatory. He performed the character of Oskar Všetečka in the Czech soap opera Ordinace v růžové zahradě.

== Theatre ==
=== ABC Theatre ===
- Frederick .... Parisot
- The Importance of Being Earnest .... Algernon Moncrief
- Příliš počestná žena .... Jakub
- Spor .... Azor
- U nás v Kocourkově .... Dr. Nykys
- České Vánoce .... Tomek
- Důkaz .... Hal
- Šakalí léta .... Eda Drábek
- Ach, ta láska prodejná.... Youngster, Viola Theatre
- Hodina mezi psem a vlkem .... František Villon
- Jezinky Bezinky .... O´Hara
- Kočičí hra
- Mahábhárata .... Ashwattháman
- Mamzelle Nitouche .... Loriot
- Mrtvé duše .... Mr. Petruška
- Some Like It Hot .... singer Sugar
- Pan Kaplan má třídu rád .... Vasil Hruška
- Plukovník Pták
- Pohádková detektivka .... Sherlock Holmes
- Pohádky z košíku .... many roles
- Pohádky do kapsy ....
- Pověsti pro štěstí .... Choreography+many roles
- Rebelové .... Olda/Šimon
- Skapinova šibalství .... Leandr
- Slaměný klobouk .... Bobin
- Taxi na věčnost .... Eddie
- Troye v lodke, ne schitaya sobaki .... Young Jerome
- Turandot .... Kalaf
- Perfect Wedding .... Bill
- Twelfth Night .... Sebastian
- The Merry Wives of Windsor .... Abraham Tintítko
- V jámě lvové .... Jakschitz
- Voják a tanečnice .... Croupier/Molière

== Other stage works ==
- Benátská vdovička .... Arlecchino, Jaroslav Ježek Conservatory
- Romeo and Juliet, Most Theatre
- The Picture of Dorian Gray .... Adrian, Ta Fantastika Theatre
- Žena v černém ..... Actor, Rubín Theatre
- Players .... Glov jr., Rokoko Theatre
- Saturnin .... Jiří, Příbram's Theatre
- Touha .... Benedikt Berousek, Kalich Theatre
- Zlatí uhoři .... Hugo, Rokoko Theatre
- Já, Francois Villon¨... muzikál...Jiří Hubač / Ondřej Brzobohatý / Pavel Vrba ... Divadlo Na Jezerce

== Filmography ==
- Little Knights Tale (2009)
- "Proč bychom se netopili" (2009) TV series
- Zrození rytířů (2009 (TV)
- Skeletoni (2008)
- Ro(c)k podvraťáků (2006)
- "Bazén" (2005) TV series
- Stříbrná vůně mrazu (2005) (TV)
- Snowboarďáci (2004)
- Probuzená skála (2003) (TV)
- Vetřelci v Coloradu (2002) (TV)
- Štěstí krále Alfonse (1996) (TV)
- V den psa (1994)
- Městem chodí Mikuláš (1992)
