= Smradi =

Smradi is a Czech drama film. It was released in 2002.
