= Ctrl Emotion =

Ctrl Emotion is a Czech comedy film. It was released in 2009.

== Plot ==
The film is the story of a young man (Jiří Mádl) who does not know how to deal with his adolescence and the influence of the Internet.
