= Tomáš Hanák =

Slovak actor

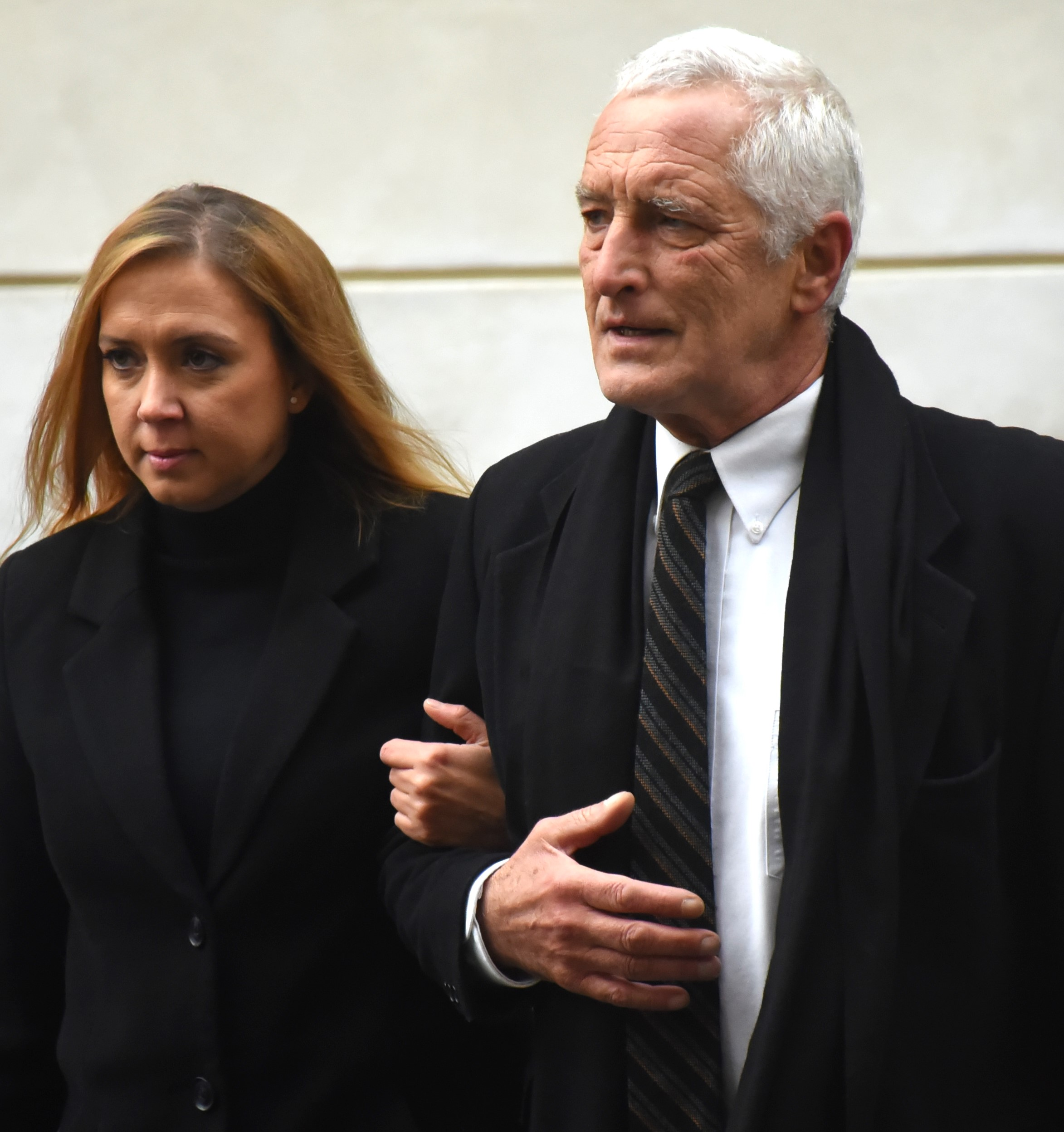
- Hanák in 2023
- Born: March 27, 1957 (age 69); Kremnica, Czechoslovakia
- Occupations: actor, TV presenter, screenwriter, and singer
- Years active: 1984-present

Tomáš Hanák (born March 27, 1957) is a Czech actor, comedian, screenwriter, and TV presenter who has appeared in several films and television shows since 1984. He is also an occasional singer.

== Biography ==
Hanák was born in Kremnica, Czechoslovakia (now Slovakia). He spent two years in Cuba when he was a child, travelling a lot with his parents, where his father worked as a representative of the PZO in the implementation of engineering contracts. From his youth he devoted himself to rowing and repeatedly competed as a representative of Czechoslovakia in non-socialist countries. He became a repeated champion of the Czech Republic. After graduating from high school and a failed attempt to be admitted to the Faculty of the Academy of Performing of Arts in Prague, he began studying economics at Charles University in Prague, specialised in foreign trade. He was unofficially expelled from the school for disseminating anti-socialist texts. Since 1977 he has been active in the popular Czech theatre Sklep as an actor and writer. He played in many Czech films, commercials, and programmes, especially on Czech television. In 2005 he even appeared in the role as a woodsman in Hollywood movie The Brothers Grimm. He recently appeared on the Czech stand-up comedy Na stojáka, which was aired on the channel HBO. In the 1990s as he openly recognized his problems with alcohol, and has been tee-total since 1994; he successfully underwent treatment at the detoxification centre hospital Havlickuv Brod

== Personal life ==
Hanák also had roles as a television presenter, engaging in the charitable programme Pomoze detem. He is a member of the Scouting Movement in the science foundation Chain of Love for Children (Řetěz lásky k detem), which combats the rise of smoking among children. Hanák is married with three children and lives in Nižbor, where he has renovated wooden railway buildings into a stylish theme-pub. During the presidential election campaign in 2012, he attracted attention with performances suggesting the former Prime Ministers of the Czech Republic Miloš Zeman and Jan Fischer withdraw from candidacy. In 2009 he released his own album Tomas Hanak.

== Selected filmography ==
- Poklad hraběte Chamaré (1984)
- ING. (1985)
- Chemikal (1986)
- Bony a klid (1987)
- A Hoof Here, a Hoof There (1988)
- Pražská pětka (1989)
- Kamenný Most (1996)
- Zdivočelá země (1997)
- Traps (1998)
- Pat & Mat (1998) - episode Playing Cards
- Madame Quatre et ses enfants (1999)
- Out of the City (2000)
- Rebelové (2001)
- Angelina (2002)
- Mazaný Filip (2003)
- The Brothers Grimm (2005)
- Gympl (2007)
- Soukromé pasti (2008)
- Shameless (2008)
- Comeback (2009)
- Martin a Venuše (2012)
