= Little Knights Tale =

- Ať žijí rytíři!
- Directed by: Karel Janák
- Produced by: Magdaléna Sedláková; Boris Krištof; Igor Krištof; Vladimír Krištof; Viktor Krištof
- Starring: David Prachař; Dany Mesároš; Ivana Korolová; Pavel Kříž; Tereza Voříšková
- Cinematography: Martin Preiss
- Edited by: Martin Kirov
- Music by: Ondřej Brzobohatý; Miroslav Chyška
- Distributed by: Bontonfilm
- Release date: 8 October 2009
- Running time: 105 minutes
- Country: Czech Republic
- Language: Czech

Little Knights Tale (Czech: Ať žijí rytíři!) is a 2009 Czech comedy film directed by Karel Janák. It was shown at the 2011 Berlin International Film Festival.

== Cast ==
- Pavel Kříž as Albrecht z Krvenos
- David Prachař as Martin z Vamberka
- Dany Mesároš as Petr
- Ivana Korolová as Tereza
- Jan Komínek as Vítek
- Štěpán Krtička as Michal
- Andrea Žádníková as Katerina
- Tereza Voříšková as Jana
- Matěj Hádek as Ruprecht
- Martin Písařík as Varvar
- Michael Beran as Ignác
- Jan Battěk as Adam
- Predrag Bjelac as Ahmed
- Hynek Čermák as Albrechtuv Velitel
- Ota Jirák as Hynek
