= Lucie Zedníčková =

Czech actress (born 1968)

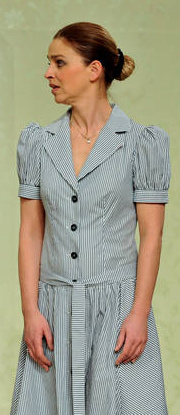
- Born: 15 November 1968 (age 57); Prague, Czechoslovakia
- Occupation: Actress
- Years active: 1979-present

Lucie Zedníčková (born 15 November 1968) is a Czech actress. She performed in more than twenty films since 1979, and several television series.

== Selected filmography ==
Film
| Year | Title | Role | Notes |
|---|---|---|---|
| 1997 | Dead Fire | Celeste | |
| 1994 | Saturnin | | |
| 1991 | Kouř | | |
| 1979 | Love Between the Raindrops | | |
