= Skřítek =

2005 Czech comedy film

- Theatrical release poster
- Directed by: Tomáš Vorel
- Written by: Tomáš Vorel
- Produced by: Romana Brožková
- Starring: Bolek Polívka; Eva Holubová; Marika Procházková; Jiří Macháček; Ivana Chýlková
- Cinematography: Marek Jícha
- Edited by: Marek Jícha
- Music by: MIG 21
- Distributed by: Warner Bros. Pictures
- Release date: 17 March 2005
- Running time: 90 minutes
- Country: Czech Republic
- Language: Czech

Skřítek is a Czech comedy film. It was released in 2005. It could be called a "feature butcherly slapstick". Skřítek is a slapstick film, so the dialogues are substituted for interjections and all the sounds are stylised. Tomáš Vorel decided to film a slapstick film after several years as his debut in this genre was an episode in a Czech film Pražská pětka that was filmed in 1988.

== Cast ==
- Eva Holubová as Mother
- Bolek Polívka as Father
- Anna Marhoulová as Daughter
- Tomáš Vorel Jr. as Son
- Marika Sarah Procházková as Father's Lover (credited as Marika Procházková)
- Jiří Macháček as The Biker Butcher
- Ivana Chýlková as Son's Teacher
