= Out of the City =

2000 Czech comedy film

- Directed by: Tomáš Vorel
- Written by: Tomáš Vorel
- Produced by: Ondřej Trojan
- Starring: Tomáš Hanák
- Cinematography: Marek Jicha
- Edited by: Vladimír Barák
- Music by: Michal Vích
- Distributed by: FALCON, a. s.
- Release date: 5 October 2000
- Running time: 104 minutes
- Country: Czech Republic
- Language: Czech

Out of the City (Czech: Cesta z města) is a Czech comedy film directed by Tomáš Vorel. It was released in 2000. Out of the City is Vorel's fourth feature film.

== Plot ==
A programmer named Honza decides to clear his head over the weekend from his hectic job, picks up his ex-wife's son, and together they set off on a trip into the countryside. Their civilization is highlighted in the film using mobile phone, laptop and digital camera. They become familiar with a charming country girl named Markéta and her grandmother, who live in a house with scented herbs and homemade liqueurs. A weekend trip stretches to several weeks stay in the small village. Honza and his son spend the most beautiful and gayest moments of their life in the country. The film is a parade of quirky rural characters. Honza's absence from work and his son from school is not without consequences, and father and son are forced to return to civilization. But Honza cannot forget his weeks in the country, or the girl Margaret.

== Cast and characters ==
- Tomáš Hanák as Honza
- Barbora Nimcová as Markéta
- Michal Vorel as Honzík
- Anezka Kusiaková as Anicka
- Luba Skořepová as Granny
- Bolek Polívka as Ludva
- Eva Holubová as Vlastička, Ludva's wife
- Leoš Suchařípa as Beekeeper
- Alena Stréblová as Helena
- David Vávra as Jarda
- Jirí Burda as Coachman (as Jirí Hruska)
- Milan Šteindler as Hunter
- Radomil Uhlir
- Petr Čtvrtníček
- Tomáš Vorel Jr. as Ludva's son
- Daniela Kolářová as Markéta's mother

== Music ==
In the film we see several original songs, Cesta z města (The Way of the City), Dva skřítci (Two Elves), and also a choral passage of the Easter responsory O Filii et Filiae by Jean Tisserand (only a Czech text is used here, the music differs from the original).
