= Pavel Koutecký =

Pavel Koutecký (10 June 1956 – 13 April 2006) was a Czech documentary film director.

Koutecký was born in Prague, Czechoslovakia, and graduated from FAMU in 1982. He died in an accidental fall from a tall building under construction in the Pankrác area of Prague while preparing a documentary about the risks taken by people who climb skyscrapers.
