= Babicka (2003 film) =

2003 film

- Directed by: Ales Fajx
- Produced by: Bohumir Fajx; Jana Fajxova
- Starring: Bohumir Fajx; Marie Hlubuckova; David Kostelecky; Věra Kubánková; Ivana Stejskalová
- Cinematography: Jan Kebrdle
- Edited by: Jan Kebrdle
- Music by: Livores Mortis
- Release date: 21 February 2003
- Country: Czech Republic
- Language: Czech

Babicka is a 2003 Czech drama film directed by Ales Fajx. The film's music was composed by Livores Mortis.

== Cast ==
- Bohumir Fajx
- Marie Hlubuckova
- David Kostelecky
- Věra Kubánková
- Ivana Stejskalová
