= Jan Hartl =

Czech actor

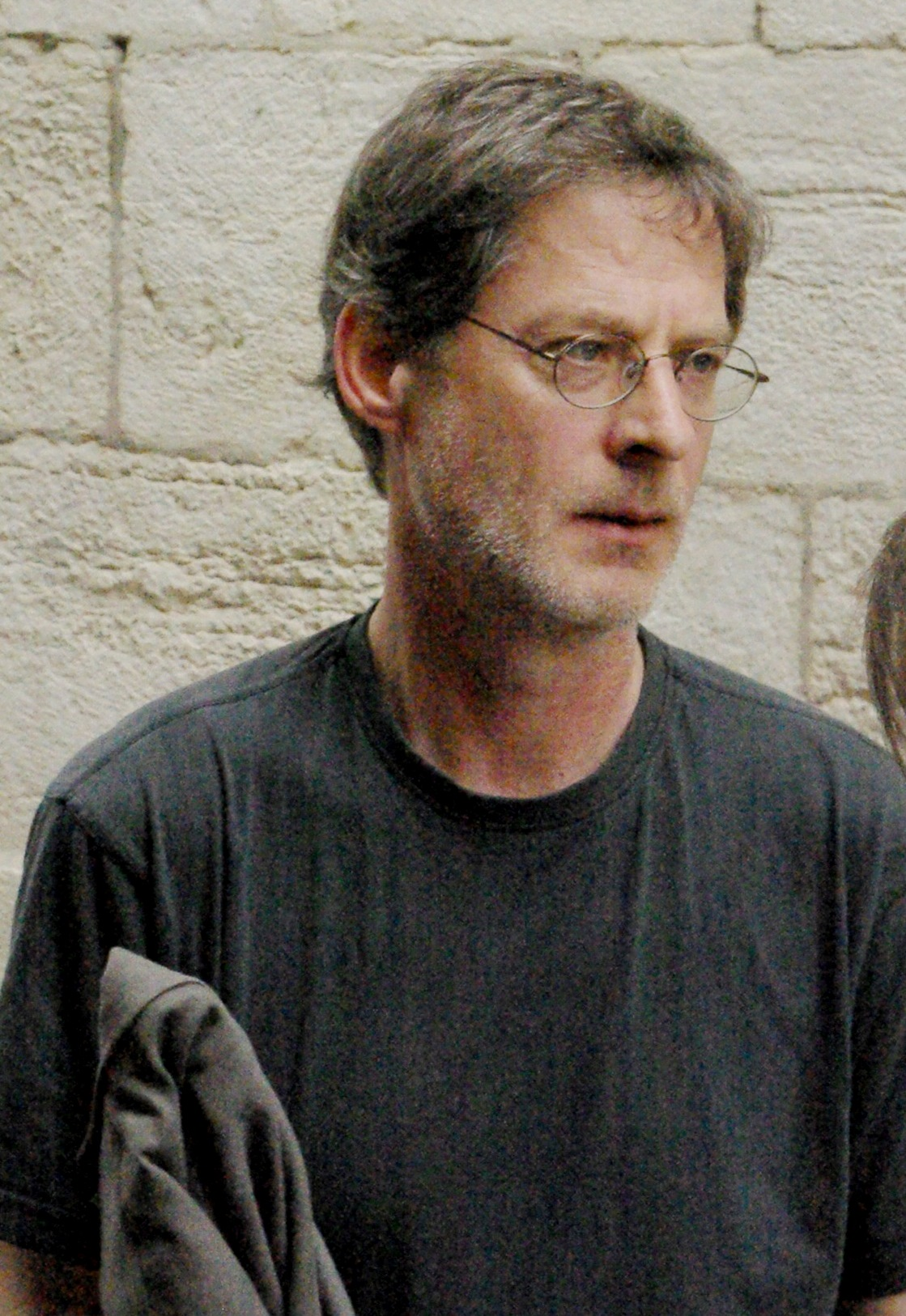
- Jan Hartl (2009)
- Born: 12 September 1952 (age 72); Prague, Czechoslovakia
- Occupation: Actor
- Years active: 1974–present

Jan Hartl (born 12 September 1952) is a Czech actor who played Karel Horák in the 2000 Czech film Little Otik, also known as Otesánek. He was born in Prague, Czech Republic (then part of Czechoslovakia). Hartl is a member of the National Theatre in Prague.

== Selected filmography ==
- Day for My Love (1976)
- Kopretiny pro zámeckou paní (1981)
- Tajemství hradu v Karpatech (1981)
- Anděl s ďáblem v těle (1983)
- My Sweet Little Village (1985)
- The Post Office Girl (1988, TV film)
- Golet v údolí (1995)
- Little Otik (2000)
- An Earthly Paradise for the Eyes (2009)
- The Don Juans (2013)
