= Věra Kubánková =

Czech actress

- Born: 22 July 1924; Košice, Czechoslovakia
- Died: 13 April 2016 (aged 91); Prague, Czech Republic
- Occupation: Actress
- Years active: 1959–2016

Věra Kubánková (22 July 1924 – 13 April 2016) was a Czech actress. At the 2006 Thalia Awards she was honoured in the lifetime achievement in theatre category. She worked at the Divadlo za branou during the 1960s and 1970s. Kubánková also took to the stage in the Czech cities of Jihlava and Zlín, but most of her performances came in Prague.

== Selected filmography ==
- Žena za pultem (1978, TV series)
- The Night of the Emerald Moon (1985)
- The Post Office Girl (1988, TV film)
- Babicka (2003)
- Toys in the Attic (2009)
- The Snake Brothers (2015)
