= Eva Holubová =

Czech actress (born 1959)

- Holubová in 2023
- Born: 7 March 1959 (age 67); Prague, Czechoslovakia
- Education: Academy of Performing Arts in Prague
- Occupation: Actress
- Years active: 1981–present
- Notable work: Ene Bene; Účastníci zájezdu

Eva Holubová (born 7 March 1959) is a Czech actress. She is known for having cured herself of alcoholism. She received a Czech Lion Award in 2000 for her supporting role in the film Ene Bene, and in 2006, she won the award for Best Actress at the Tribeca Film Festival for her role in Účastníci zájezdu.

== Selected filmography ==
=== Film ===
List of film appearances, with year, title, and role shown
Year	Title	Role	Notes
1988	Pražská pětka	Mother	
1990	Vojtech, Called the Orphan	Marie	
1990	Vrať se do hrobu!	Classmate	
1991	Kouř	Liduška Běhalová	
1991	The Elementary School	Čejková, Tonda's mother	
1991	Requiem pro panenku	Krocová	
1997	Buttoners	Wife of the man who didn't come	
1998	Traps	Anna	
1999	Cosy Dens	Teacher	
2000	Out of the City		
2000	Andel Exit	Machatová	
2003	Pupendo	Alena Márová	
2003	Mazaný Filip	Singer	
2005	Skřítek	Mother	
2006	Účastníci zájezdu	Jolana's mother	
2007	Gympl	Headmistress Mirka	
2008	Taková normální rodinka	Hanáková	
2009	You Kiss like a God	Bohunka	
2010	Doktor od jezera hrochů	Marie Košvancová, mother-in-law	
2011	Leaving	Monika	
2012	Líbáš jako ďábel	Bohunka	
2016	How Poets Wait for a Miracle	Head nurse Vojtěcha	
2016	The Good Plumber	Luboš's mother	
2018	Patrimony	Vlasta	
2019	Shotgun Justice	Eva Součková	

=== Television ===
List of television appearances, with year, title, and role shown
Year	Title	Role	Notes
1996	Kde padají hvězdy	Ms. Kukalová	7 episodes
1996	Bubu a Filip	Teacher	4 episodes
2000	Případy detektivní kanceláře Ostrozrak	Salaquardová	4 episodes
2001	Duch český	Vlasticka Nováková	5 episodes
2001	To jsem z toho jelen		6 episodes
2006	Náves	Plívová	5 episodes
2010	Cukrárna	Schoolteacher Břízová	5 episodes
2015	Rudyho má kazdý rád	Marie	12 episodes
2016	Wasteland	Jitka Vasícková	8 episodes
2021–21	Slunečná	Hana Schwartzmüllerová	106 episodes
