= Kristýna Leichtová =

Czech actress

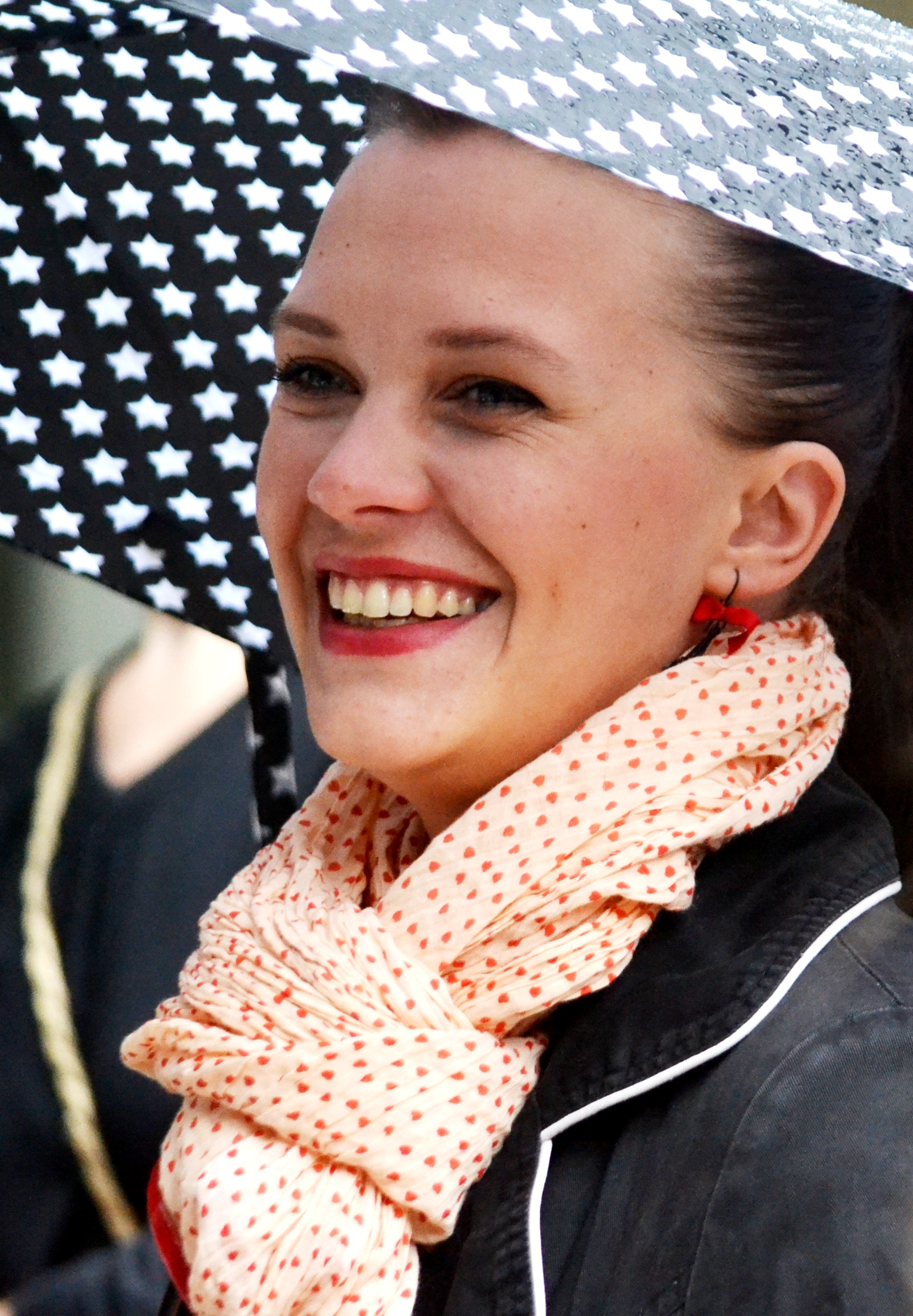
- Born: September 14, 1985 (age 40); Plzeň, Czechoslovakia (now Czech Republic)
- Occupation: Actress
- Years active: 2003–present

Kristýna Leichtová (born 14 September 1985 in Plzeň, Czechoslovakia) is a Czech actress. She appeared in the films Účastníci zájezdu, Hostel, Bastardi, and in the TV series Světla pasáže and Comeback.

== Filmography ==
- "Comeback" (2008) TV series as Iva Pacovská (2008–2010)
- "Soukromé pasti" (2008) TV series as Sofie (episode 1x10 Easy and quickly e-wife)
- "Světla pasáže" (2007) TV series as Kateřina Moravcová
- Účastníci zájezdu (2006) as Denisa
- Žralok v hlavě (2005) as Girl
- Hostel (2003)

== Theatre ==
=== Stavovské divadlo, Prague ===
- Stísněná 22 ....
- Top Girls .... Kit, waitress (2004–2005)

=== Divadlo Ta Fantastika ===
- Němcová (2008) .... Barbora, Viktorka, Dorotka, Eliška, and White Lady
- The Picture of Dorian Gray (2006) .... Sibylla Vane

=== Divadlo Na Zábradlí ===
- Včas milovat, včas umírat .... ??? (2004–2005)
- Gazdina roba .... Poluša (2004)

== Theatre of Conservatory ==
- Ťululum (2005) .... Maggy Soldignac
- Milujeme křečky (2006)
- Krvavá svatba (2006) .... neighbour
- Piknik (2006) .... Millie Owens

== Another Stage Works ==
- Zadržitelný vzestup Artura Uie .... Daisy (2002) (Divadlo Komedie)
- Král jelenem .... Deer (Divadlo Na Vinohradech)
- Kebab (2007–2012) .... Madalina (Strašnické divadlo)
- P.R.S.A. .... Kristýna, Eva's Daughter

== Video Games ==
- Kingdom Come: Deliverance II (2025) .... Face model and Czech voice actor of Katherine (Czech: Kateřina)

== Personal life ==
She has a daughter, Dorota, who was born on 19 August 2018, with her boyfriend Vojtěch Štěpánek. On 25 June 2020, her second daughter, Rozárka, was born.
