= Ro(c)k podvraťáků =

- Directed by: Karel Janák
- Written by: Karel Janák, Rudolf Merkner
- Produced by: Marek Štencl
- Starring: Jiří Mádl, Martin Písařík, Vojtěch Kotek
- Cinematography: Martin Šácha
- Edited by: Pavel Hrdlička ml.
- Music by: Miroslav Chyška
- Distributed by: Falcon
- Release date: 2 November 2006
- Running time: 104 minutes
- Country: Czech Republic
- Language: Czech
- Box office: 22,774,041 CZK

Ro(c)k podvraťáků (lit. 'The Year of the Underdogs') is a Czech comedy film directed by Karel Janák. It was released in 2006.

== Cast and characters ==
- Vojtěch Kotek as Luki
- Jiří Mádl as Márty
- Martin Písařík as Radek
- Michael Beran as Tom
- Klára Jandová as Aneta Sallingerová
- Ema Jurková as Tereza
- Kristýna Nováková as Šárka
- Václav Postránecký as Boss Sallinger
- Pavel Rímský as Igor
- Predrag Bjelac as Chřestýš
- Jan Hrušínský as starosta
- Petr Janda as Django
- Václav Sloup as Radkův děda
- Liliyan Malkina as Radkova babička

== See also ==
- Ro(c)k Podvraťáků (video game)
