= Jan Kraus (actor) =

Czech actor and television host

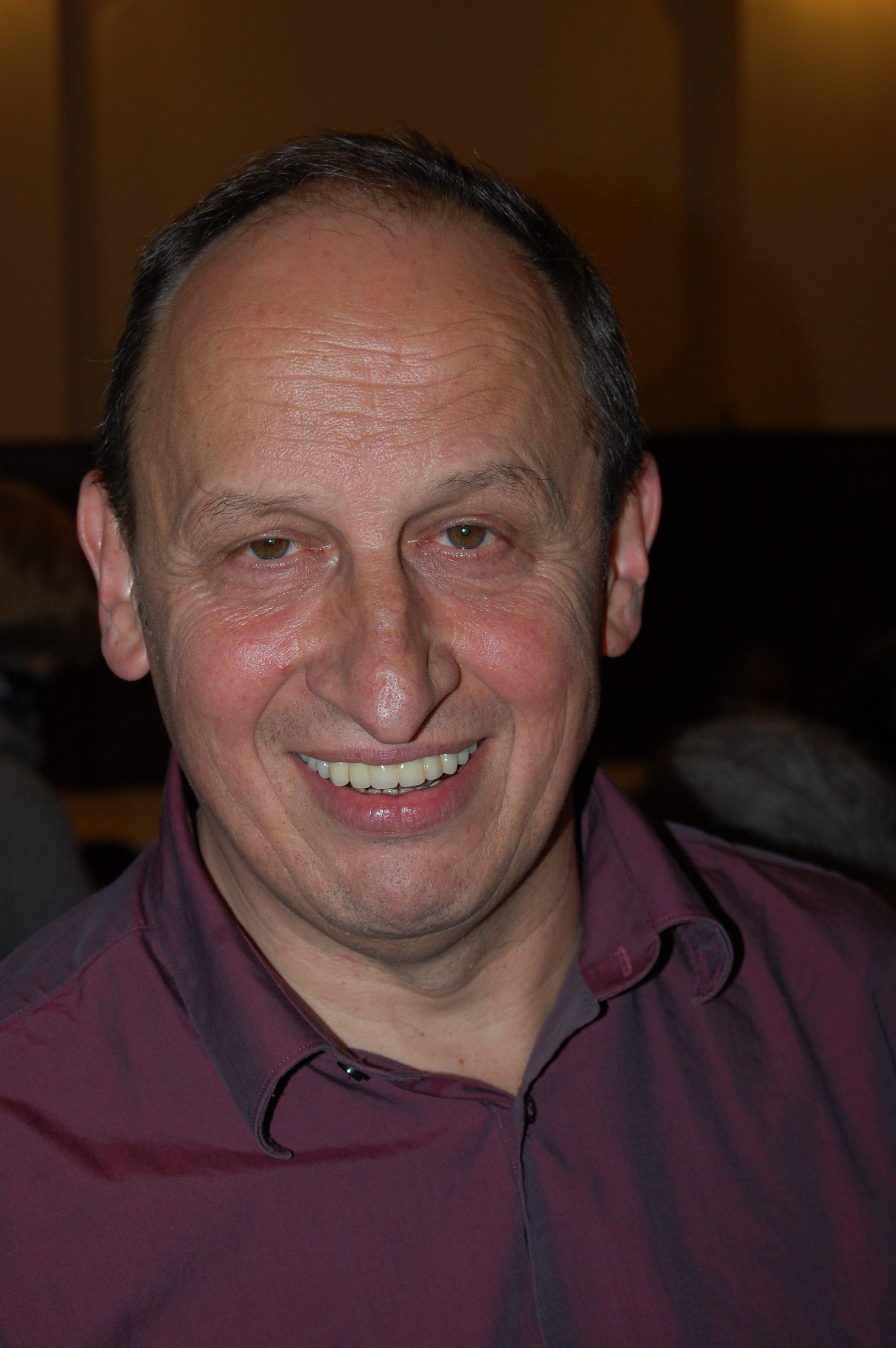
- Jan Kraus in 2010
- Born: Jan Vladimír Kraus; 15 August 1953 (age 72); Prague, Czechoslovakia
- Occupation: Actor
- Years active: 1967–present
- Spouse: Ivana Chýlková

Jan Vladimír Kraus (born 15 August 1953) is a Czech actor and TV host. He appeared in more than eighty films since 1967. Kraus was also a judge on Česko Slovensko má talent (Czecho Slovakia's Got Talent). He is the host of the television talk show Show Jana Krause. His father Ota Kraus, a Holocaust survivor, was a journalist and writer. The writer Ivan Kraus is his brother.

He has appeared in several Theatre Studio DVA productions.

== Selected filmography ==
Film
Year	Title	Role	Notes
2009	3 Seasons in Hell	Viktor Lukas	
2007	Gympl	Kolman	
2005	Skřítek	Police Chief	
2003	Mazaný Filip	Lawyer	
1994	Faust	Cornelius	
1992	Food	Eater #3	
1992	Černí baroni	Private Vonavka	
1987	Why?	Fanousek, Vandal	
1987	Who's That Soldier?	Soldier	
1985	Howling II: Your Sister Is a Werewolf	Tondo	
1981	Krakonoš a lyžníci	Financ	
1972	Dívka na koštěti	Miky Rousek	

TV
Year	Title	Role	Notes
1980-1981	Arabela	One of Peter's Friends	
