= Tomáš Vorel =

Czech actor and director (born 1957)

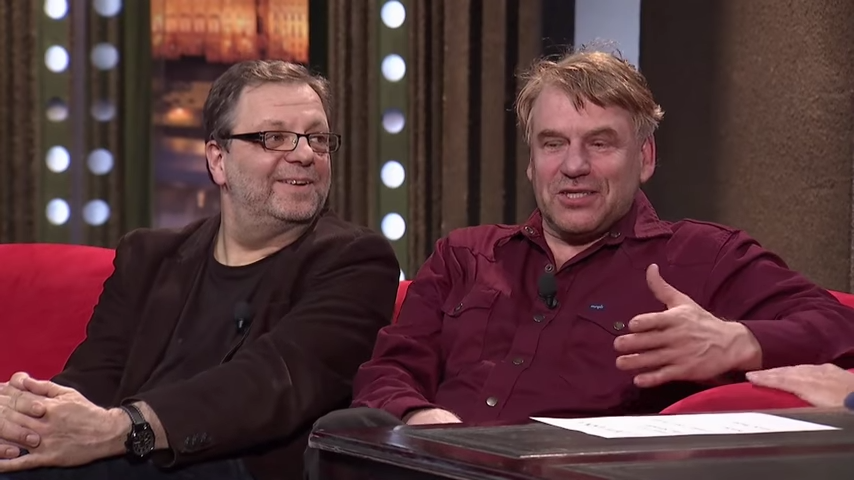
- Vorel in 2016
- Born: 2 June 1957 (age 69); Prague, Czechoslovakia
- Education: Film and TV School of the Academy of Performing Arts in Prague
- Occupations: Film director, screenwriter, producer, actor
- Years active: 1988–present
- Children: Tomáš Vorel junior

Tomáš Vorel (born 2 June 1957) is a Czech film director, screenwriter, actor, producer and cameraman. He studied at Film and TV School of the Academy of Performing Arts in Prague, graduating in 1989. Vorel's tenth film, The Good Plumber, was released in 2016. His son, Tomáš Vorel junior is an actor, who has performed in his father's films.

== Selected filmography ==
Film
Year	Title	Role	Notes
1988	Pražská pětka		director
1991	Kouř		director
1996	Stone Bridge		director
2000	Out of the City (Cesta z města)		actor / director
2003	Mazaný Filip		actor
2005	Skřítek		actor / director
2007	Gympl	janitor	actor / director
2009	Catch the Billionaire		director
2012	To the Woods		director
2014	Vejška		director
2016	The Good Plumber (Instalatér z Tuchlovic)		director / screenwriter
2021	Cesta domu		director
2025	Džob		director / screenwriter / cinematographer / producer
