= Pražská pětka =

1988 Czechoslovak comedy film

- Directed by: Tomáš Vorel
- Written by: Tomáš Vorel; David Vávra; Čestmír Suška
- Starring: Milan Šteindler; Eva Holubová
- Cinematography: Roman Pavlíček; Antonín Weiser
- Edited by: Jiří Brožek
- Music by: Jiří Chlumecký; Pavel Richter; Jaroslav Vaculík
- Distributed by: Bontonfilm
- Release date: 1988
- Running time: 97 min.
- Country: Czechoslovakia
- Language: Czech

Pražská pětka is a Czechoslovak comedy film released in 1988. It presents five short stories.
