= Eva Podzimková =

Czech actress (born 1990)

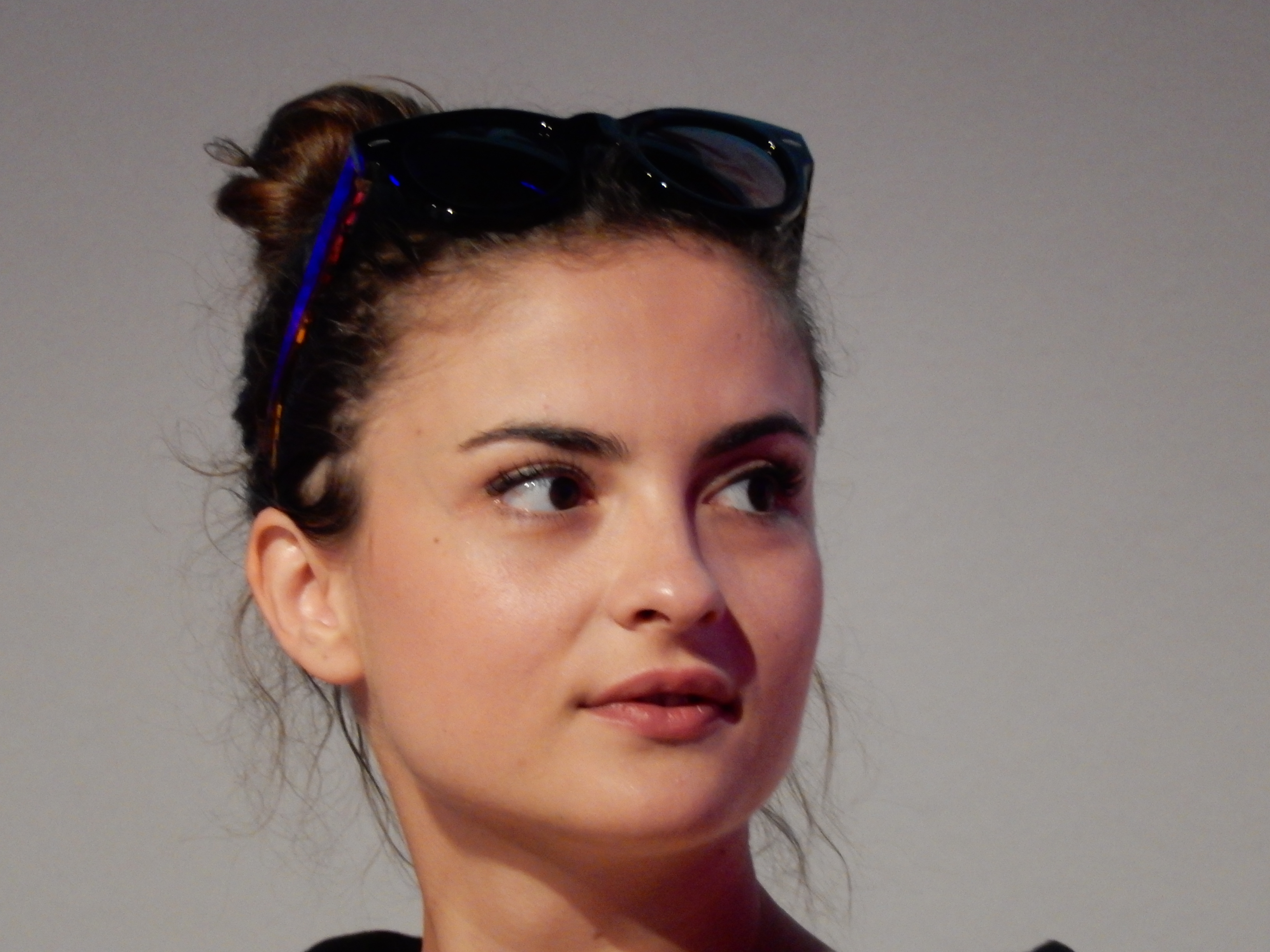
- Born: Eva Josefíková; 3 February 1990 (age 35); Uherské Hradiště, Czechoslovakia
- Occupation: Actress
- Years active: 2010–present
- Spouse: Matěj Podzimek (m. 2022)
- Children: 1

Eva Podzimková, maiden name Josefíková (born 3 February 1990) is a Czech film and stage actress. She studied at the Faculty of Theatre.

== Selected filmography ==
- The Don Juans (2013)
- Vejška (2014)
- Fair Play (2014)
- 1864 (television, 2014)
