= Ivana Chýlková =

Czech actress

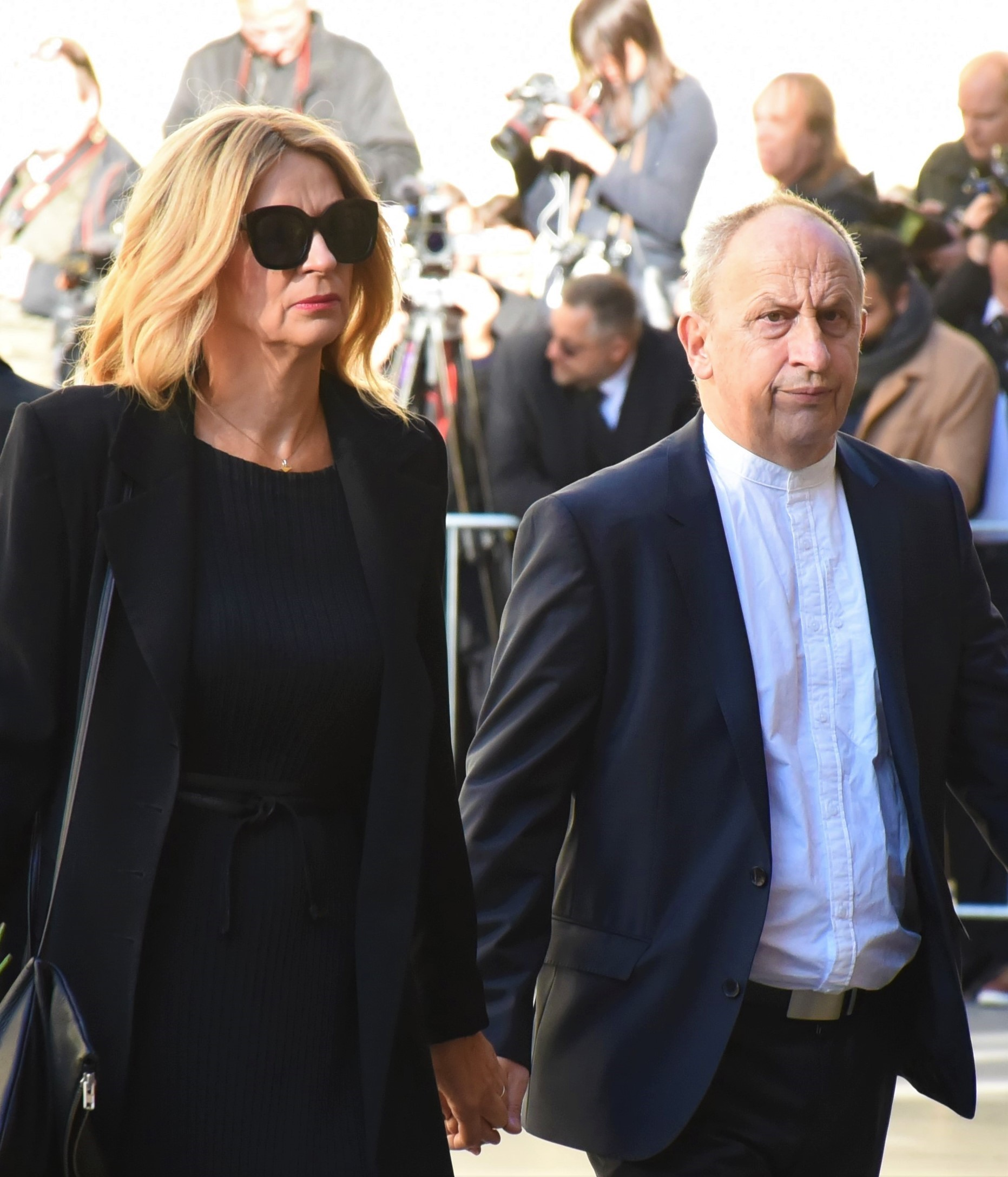
- Ivana Chýlková (left) with Jan Kraus (2019)
- Born: 27 September 1963 (age 62); Prague, Czechoslovakia
- Occupation: Actress
- Years active: 1983–present
- Spouse: Jan Kraus
- Partner: Karel Roden (1985–1994)

Ivana Chýlková (born 27 September 1963) is a Czech actress. She appeared in more than eighty films since 1983.

In 1985, she graduated from DAMU. She has appeared in several Theatre Studio DVA productions.

Chýlková is married to actor Jan Kraus.

== Selected filmography ==
Film
Year	Title	Role	Notes
1983	The Very Late Afternoon of a Faun		
1992	The Inheritance or Fuckoffguysgoodday		
1994	Thanks for Every New Morning		
1995	Vášnivý bozk		
2000	Victims and Murderers		
2005	Skřítek		
2008	Taková normální rodinka		
2013	The Don Juans		

TV
Year	Title	Role	Notes
1984	Kriminálka Anděl		
1986	Povídka s dobrým koncem		
