= 2017 Czech Lion Awards =

Czech film and TV award ceremony

25th Czech Lion Awards
- Date: March 10, 2018
- Site: Rudolfinum, Prague
- Hosted by: Adela Vinczeová

Highlights
- Best Picture: Ice Mother
- Best Actor: Pavel Nový; Ice Mother
- Best Actress: Zuzana Kronerová; Ice Mother
- Best Supporting Actor: Oldřich Kaiser; Barefoot
- Best Supporting Actress: Petra Špalková; Ice Mother
- Most awards: Ice Mother (6)
- Most nominations: Ice Mother (15)

Television coverage
- Network: Česká televize
- Ratings: 707,000

2017 Czech Lion Awards ceremony was held on 10 March 2018. Ice Mother has won 6 awards including Award for the best film.

== Winners and nominees ==
Best Film	Best Director
Ice Mother – Pavel Strnad, Petr Oukropec; The Quartette – Ondřej Zima; Milada – David Mrnka, Kristina Hejduková, Juan Mayne; Barefoot – Jan Svěrák; Filthy – Miloš Lochman, Peter Badač, Karel Chvojka	Bohdan Sláma – Ice Mother; Miroslav Krobot – The Quartette; Václav Kadrnka – Little Crusader; Jan Svěrák – Barefoot; Tereza Nvotová – Filthy
Best Actor in a Leading Role	Best Actress in a Leading Role
Pavel Nový – Ice Mother; Karel Roden – Little Crusader; Jaroslav Plesl – The Quartette; Vladimír Javorský – Milada; Ondřej Vetchý – Barefoot	Zuzana Kronerová – Ice Mother; Barbora Poláková – The Quartette; Ayelet Zurer – Milada; Tereza Voříšková – Barefoot; Dominika Morávková – Filthy
Best Actor in a Supporting Role	Best Actress in a Supporting Role
Oldřich Kaiser – Barefoot; Marek Daniel – Ice Mother; Václav Neužil – Ice Mother; Patrik Holubář – Filthy; Martin Finger – Garden Store	Petra Špalková – Ice Mother; Tatiana Vilhelmová – Ice Mother; Pavlína Štorková – The Quartette; Anna Šišková – Filthy; Sabina Remundová – Garden Store
Best Screenplay	Best Editing
Barefoot – Vladimír Smutný; Little Crusader – Jiří Soukup, Vojtěch Mašek, Václav Kadrnka; The Quartette – Miroslav Krobot, Lubomír Smékal; Barefoot – Jan Svěrák, Zdeněk Svěrák; Filthy – Barbora Námerová	Filthy – Jiří Brožek, Michal Lánský, Jana Vlčková; Ice Mother – Jan Daňhel; The Quartette – Jan Daňhel; Milada – Olina Kaufmanová; Barefoot – Alois Fišárek
Best Cinematography	Stage Design
Ice Mother – Bohdan Sláma; Ice Mother – Diviš Marek; Little Crusader – Jan Baset Střítežský; Milada – Martin Štrba; Filthy – Marek Dvořák	Laika – Aurel Klimt, Martin Velíšek, František Lipták; Ice Mother – Jan Vlasák; Little Crusader – Luca Servino, Daniel Pitín; Milada – Milan Býček; Barefoot – Jan Vlasák
Makeup and Hairstyling	Costume Design
Milada – Andrea McDonald; Ice Mother – Zdeněk Klika; Little Crusader – Lukáš Král; Barefoot – Milan Vlček; Garden Store – Zdeněk Klika	Milada – Simona Rybáková; Ice Mother – Zuzana Krejzková; Little Crusader – Katarína Štrbová Bieliková; Barefoot – Simona Rybáková; Garden Store – Katarína Štrbová Bieliková
Music	Sound
Little Crusader – Irena Havlová, Vojtěch Havel; 8 Heads of Madness – Vladivojna La Chia; Milada – Aleš Březina, Drew Alan; Barefoot – Michal Novinski; Garden Store – Petr Ostrouchov	Barefoot – Jakub Čech, Claus Lynge; Bába z ledu – Michal Holubec, Marek Poledna; Little Crusader – Jan Čeněk; The Quartette – Viktor Ekrt; Milada – Jiří Klenka
Unique Contribution to Czech Film	Best Documentary
Alois Fišárek	Cervena – Pavel Berčík; The Limits of Work – Petr Kubica, Filip Remunda, Vít Klusák; The Lust for Power – Zuzana Mistríková, Tereza Polachová, Kateřina Černá; Let Misik Sing! – Viktor Schwarcz; The White World According to Daliborek – Filip Remunda, Vít Klusák
Best Television Film or Miniseries	Best TV Series
Justice – Peter Bebjak; Zádušní oběť – Jiří Svoboda; Kozy léčí – Lenka Wimmerová	World under your head – Marek Najbrt, Radim Špaček; Bohéma – Robert Sedláček; Dwarf – Jan Prušinovský

=== Non-statutory Awards ===
- Best Film Poster
  - Barefoot - Jiří Karásek, Lukáš Fišárek
- Film Fans Award
  - Barefoot - Jan Svěrák
- Magnesie Award for Best Student Film
  - Atlantida, 2003 – Michal Blaško
