= 1996 Czech Lion Awards =

Czech film award ceremony

4th Czech Lion Awards
- Date: March 1, 1997
- Site: Lucerna, Prague
- Hosted by: Pavel Zedníček

Highlights
- Best Picture: Kolya
- Best Actor: Bolek Polívka; Forgotten Light
- Best Actress: Libuše Šafránková; Kolya
- Best Supporting Actor: Andrey Khalimon; Kolya
- Best Supporting Actress: Veronika Žilková; Forgotten Light
- Most awards: Kolya (6)
- Most nominations: Kolya (12)

Television coverage
- Network: Czech Television

1996 Czech Lion Awards ceremony was held on 1 March 1997.

== Winners and nominees ==
Best Film	Best Director
Kolya	Jan Svěrák — Kolya
Best Actor in a Leading Role	Best Actress in a Leading Role
Bolek Polívka — Forgotten Light	Libuše Šafránková — Kolya
Best Actor in a Supporting Role	Best Actress in a Supporting Role
Andrey Khalimon — Kolya	Veronika Žilková — Forgotten Light
Best Screenplay	Best Editing
Kolya	Kolya
Design	Best Cinematography
King Ubu	King Ubu
Music	Sound
King Ubu	Forgotten Light
Unique Contribution to Czech Film
Jiří Menzel

=== Non-statutory Awards ===
Best Foreign Film	Most Popular Film
Trainspotting	Independence Day
Worst Film	Cinema Readers' Award
Seize the Day	Kolya
Film Critics' Award
Kolya
