= 2001 Czech Lion Awards =

Czech film award ceremony

9th Czech Lion Awards
- Date: March 2, 2002
- Site: Prague
- Hosted by: Jaroslav Dušek and Martin Zbrožek

Highlights
- Best Picture: Little Otik
- Best Actor: Vlastimil Brodský; Autumn Spring
- Best Actress: Stella Zázvorková; Autumn Spring
- Best Supporting Actor: Stanislav Zindulka; Autumn Spring
- Best Supporting Actress: Zuzana Kronerová; The Wild Bees
- Most awards: Dark Blue World (4); Autumn Spring (4)
- Most nominations: Dark Blue World (12)

Television coverage
- Network: Česká televize

2001 Czech Lion Awards ceremony was held on 2 March 2002. Jan Švankmajer's Little Otik has won the Best film award.

== Winners and nominees ==
Best Film	Best Director
Little Otik	Jan Svěrák — Dark Blue World
Best Actor in a Leading Role	Best Actress in a Leading Role
Vlastimil Brodský — Autumn Spring	Stella Zázvorková — Autumn Spring
Best Actor in a Supporting Role	Best Actress in a Supporting Role
Stanislav Zindulka — Autumn Spring	Zuzana Kronerová — The Wild Bees
Best Screenplay	Best Editing
Autumn Spring — Jiří Hubač	Dark Blue World — Alois Fišárek
Design	Best Cinematography
Little Otik — Jan Švankmajer, Eva Švankmajerová	Dark Blue World — Vladimír Smutný
Music	Sound
Dark Blue World — Ondřej Soukup	Rebels — Otto Chlpek, Radim Hladík ml.
Unique Contribution to Czech Film
Otakar Vávra

=== Non-statutory Awards ===
Best Foreign Film	Most Popular Film
Amélie	Dark Blue World
Worst Film	Cinema Readers' Award
How to steal Dagmara	Dark Blue World
Film Critics' Award	Best Film Poster
Dark Blue World	Eva Švankmajerová — Little Otik
