= Spring of Life =

Spring of Life may refer to:

- Spring of Life (song)
- Spring of Life (1957 film)
- Spring of Life (2000 film)
- Lebensborn, literally "Fount of Life"
