= Chlap =

- Genre: Drama
- Country of origin: Czech Republic
- Original language: Czech
- No. of seasons: 1
- No. of episodes: 16

Production
- Running time: 55-60 minutes

Original release
- Network: TV Nova
- Release: March 13 – June 23, 2022

Chlap is a 2022 Czech television series. It starrs Tomáš Maštalír, Jitka Ježková, Andrea Růžičková, Jiří Dvořák, Ivan Lupták and Eva Leinweberová. It premiered on March 10, 2022. It is an adaptation of the Italian series Doc – Nelle tue mani from 2020 broadcast on Rai 1.

== Cast and characters ==
- Tomáš Maštalír as doc. MUDr. Ondřej Frank
- Jitka Ježková as MUDr. Hana Franková
- Andrea Růžičková as MUDr. Eva Ulmanová
- Ivan Lupták as MUDr. Adam Štraus
- Jiří Dvořák as MUDr. Marek Sýkora
- Jenovéfa Boková as MUDr. Tereza Černá
- Valer Mbila as MUDr. Gabriel Kidane
- Jan Nedbal as MUDr. Filip Coufal
- Elizaveta Maximová as MUDr. Linda Myšičková
- Robert Hájek as MUDr. Michal Kovář
- Eva Leinweberová as Mgr. Lenka Trčková
- Martin Myšička as MUDr. Karel Drtina
- Stanislava Jachnická as MUDr. Marta Gráblová
- Pavel Batěk as Tomáš Dobrovolský
