= Došek =

Došek (feminine: Došková, in Slovak also Došeková) is a Czech surname. The word došek means 'thatch'. Notable people with the surname include:

- Emília Došeková (1937–2021), Slovak actress
- Kateřina Došková (born 1982), Czech footballer
- Libor Došek (born 1978), Czech footballer
- Lukáš Došek (born 1978), Czech footballer
- Tomáš Došek (born 1978), Czech footballer
