= Frankenstein (miniseries) =

- Based on: Frankenstein by Mary Shelley
- Written by: Mark Kruger
- Directed by: Kevin Connor
- Starring: Luke Goss; Alec Newman; Julie Delpy; William Hurt; Jean Rochefort; Nicole Lewis; Mark Jax; Ian McNeice; Dan Stevens; Donald Sutherland
- Composer: Roger Bellon
- Country of origin: United States
- Original language: English
- No. of episodes: 2

Production
- Producer: James Wilberger
- Cinematography: Alan Caso
- Editor: Jennifer Jean Cacavas
- Running time: 177 minutes
- Production company: Hallmark Entertainment

Original release
- Network: Hallmark Channel
- Release: October 5 – October 6, 2004

Frankenstein is a 2004 American Gothic science fiction television miniseries directed by Kevin Connor, based on the 1818 novel Frankenstein; or, The Modern Prometheus by Mary Shelley. Alec Newman stars as Victor Frankenstein, an anatomist who is tormented by a creature of his own making, played by Luke Goss. Donald Sutherland co-stars as Captain Robert Walton.

The miniseries premiered on the Hallmark Channel in two parts. It received generally positive reviews for its attempt to faithfully adapt the Shelley novel.

== Plot ==
Captain Robert Walton sets out to explore the North Pole and expand his scientific knowledge in hopes of achieving fame. While icebound, the crew spots two dog sleds, one chasing the other. A few hours later, the crew rescues one of the sled drivers, Victor Frankenstein, who is deathly ill. As he recovers, Victor tells Walton his life's story.

Born into a wealthy family in Geneva in 1793, Victor decides at a young age to become a doctor. Weeks before he leaves for university in Germany, his mother dies of scarlet fever. At university, he develops a secret technique to imbue inanimate bodies with life with the encouragement of his mentor, Professor Waldman.

After bringing a deceased dog back to life (albeit temporarily), he creates a human being from parts of corpses and brings it to life. Upon seeing the Creature, however, he is repulsed by his work: he flees the room, and the Creature disappears. Collapsing from pneumonia brought on by overwork and emotional stress, he is nursed back to health by his friend, Henry Clerval, and childhood sweetheart, Elizabeth Lavenza. He returns home to find his younger brother William murdered. Certain this is the work of the Creature, Victor retreats into the mountains to find peace - only to be confronted by the Creature himself.

The Creature - now able to talk - tells him how he wandered into a village after Victor abandoned him, only to be chased into the mountains by angry villagers. He took refuge in the shed of a remote cabin, gradually learning to speak and read through his observation of a family who lived in the cabin. After approaching the blind grandfather, who responded to him in kindness, the Creature was physically attacked by the old man's son and ran away. Traveling to Geneva, he met a little boy — Victor's brother William — outside the town of Plainpalais. Wanting to keep the frightened boy from yelling, the creature accidentally killed him. The Creature concludes his story by demanding that Frankenstein create for him a female companion, promising that if Victor grants his request, he and his mate will vanish into the uninhabited wilderness of South America.

Victor reluctantly agrees, but he eventually abandons the project and destroys the Creature's "bride", aghast at the possibility of breeding of an entire race of creatures. Furious, the Creature swears vengeance against Victor, promising to "be with him on his wedding night," and, shortly after, murders Clerval. Victor is briefly imprisoned for the murder but is eventually acquitted. Victor returns home with his father and marries Elizabeth, but on their wedding night, the Creature sneaks into the bedroom and strangles her to death. Victor's father goes mad with grief. Victor vows to hunt down and destroy the Creature. After months of pursuit, the two end up in the Arctic Circle, near the North Pole.

After hearing Frankenstein's story, Walton relents and agrees to head for home. Frankenstein begs the captain to finish off what he could not, as the creature cannot be left alive. He sees Elizabeth's ghost beckoning to him and dies shortly after. Walton soon after discovers the Creature on his ship, mourning over Victor's body. The Creature expresses remorse for what he did to Victor and his loved ones, and vows to kill himself on his own funeral pyre. Walton watches as the Creature, carrying his creator's body, wanders off into the icy wasteland of the arctic, never to be seen again.

== Cast ==
- Luke Goss as the Creature
- Alec Newman as Victor Frankenstein
  - Sonny Brown as young Victor
- Nicole Lewis as Elizabeth Frankenstein
  - Lianna Bamberg as Young Elizabeth
- Dan Stevens as Henry Clerval
  - Samo Chrtan as young Henry
- Mark Jax as Alphonse Frankenstein
- Julie Delpy as Caroline Frankenstein
- Monika Hilmerová as Justine Moritz
- Donald Sutherland as Captain Walton
- William Hurt as Professor Waldman
- Daniel Williams as William Frankenstein
- Edita Borsova as Agatha
- Jean Rochefort as the old blind man
- Ian McNeice as Professor Krempe
- Oliver La Sueur as Felix
- Hannah van der Westhuysen as Eva
- Tomáš Maštalír as the lieutenant
- Gordon Catlin as Father Beaufort
- Andrej Hryc as the magistrate
- Richard Rowlands as Clerval

== Reception ==
Reviews were generally positive, with critics singling out the film as a faithful adaptation of Shelley's work. Variety said "Faithfully retelling a 19th century gothic novel means daring to be boring in places, but the peaks far outweigh those flat and arid stretches in this beautifully assembled Hallmark production."

Kim Newman said "This finally fulfils the promise many - including Frankenstein: The True Story and Mary Shelley's Frankenstein - failed to keep and is a faithful, respectful, slightly stiff adaptation of the novel." DVD Talk gave the film three and a half stars saying "The story takes a while to get emotionally involved in, but if you give it a chance, your patience will be rewarded in the last half of the film. Because of its emphasis on tragedy over horror, and because of its loyalty to Shelley's original work, I'm going to go ahead and give this one a recommendation."

Guy Adams, writing for the British Fantasy Society, reiterates that the "three hour mini-series sticks closely to the original novel" and said, "It's definitely a TV version (though thankfully light on the usual Hallmark Channel vaseline and whimsy), a little flat in places, but it is an honourable and enjoyable attempt at providing a definitive version of Shelley's book."

=== Accolades ===
The mini-series was nominated for ASC award for Outstanding Achievement in Cinematography in Movies of the Week/Mini-Series/Pilot (Basic or Pay). It was also nominated for an Artios award for Best Mini Series Casting. It also won an Emmy Award for Outstanding Makeup for a Miniseries, Movie or a Special (Non-Prosthetic).
