= Matúš Oľha =

Slovak director

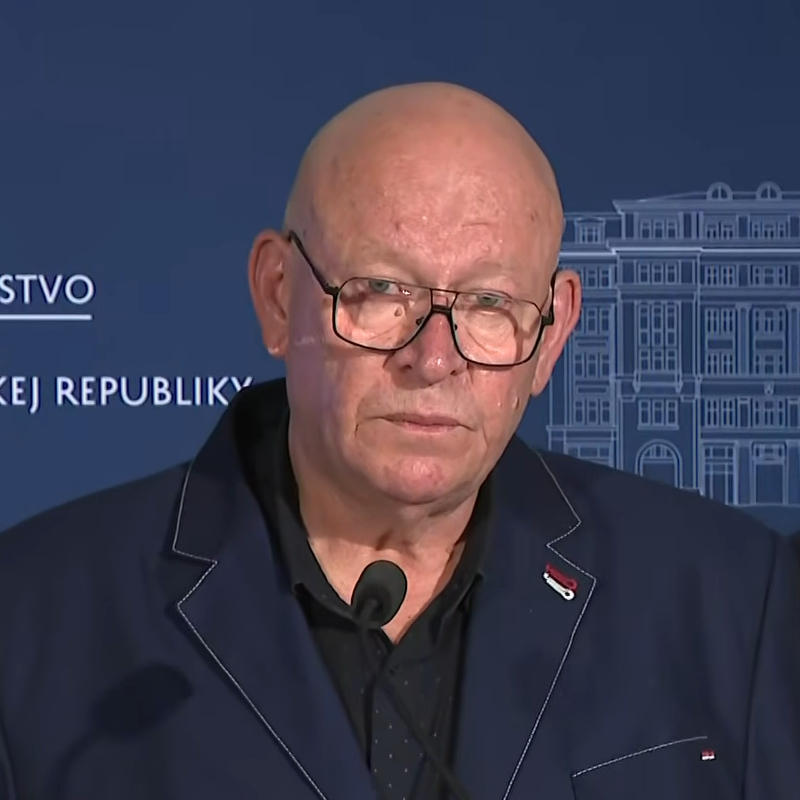
- Oľha in 2026
- Born: 8 September 1959 (age 67); Prešov, Czechoslovakia
- Education: Academy of Performing Arts in Bratislava; University of Prešov
- Occupations: Theatre and television director, university professor, photographer
- Years active: 1982–present
- Spouse(s): Jana Oľhová (m. 1983; div. 2005) Natália Oľhová
- Children: 7
- Parent: Štefan Oľha (father)

Matúš Oľha (born 8 September 1959) is a Slovak theatre and television director, university professor, photographer and former academic administrator. He served as rector of the Academy of Arts in Banská Bystrica from 2008 to 2016 and was chairman of the Board of the Arts Support Fund (Fond na podporu umenia, FPU) from March 2025 until his resignation on 23 July 2026.

== Early life and education ==
Matúš Oľha was born in Prešov, as the son of the writer Štefan Oľha. He has three sisters, including the puppeteer Zuzana Oľhová (married Erbyová).

He attended secondary school (gymnázium) in Košice from 1974 to 1978. Between 1978 and 1984 he studied theatre directing at the Theatre Faculty of the Academy of Performing Arts in Bratislava (VŠMU) under Tibor Rakovský and Juraj Svoboda. From 2004 to 2010 he completed doctoral studies in the Theory and History of Theatre at the Faculty of Arts of the University of Prešov, receiving a PhD.

During his studies he directed at the amateur Malé divadelné štúdio in Košice. His production of Karel Čapek's The White Disease (1982) won the nationwide amateur theatre festival Scénická žatva in Martin.

== Career ==
=== Theatre directing ===
Oľha began his professional career as an in-house director at the Jozef Gregor Tajovský Theatre in Zvolen (1984–1988). From 1988 to 2005 he was a resident director at the Slovak National Uprising Theatre in Martin (now the Slovak Chamber Theatre). He has also worked as a guest director at numerous Slovak theatres (including the Alexander Duchnovič Theatre and Jonáš Záborský Theatre in Prešov, the Andrej Bagar Theatre in Nitra, and the City Theatre in Žilina) as well as at the Moravian Theatre in Olomouc, Czech Republic. He has collaborated with amateur ensembles, notably the Ján Chalupka Theatre Company in Brezno.

His directing work centres on Slovak classical drama (especially plays by Ján Chalupka, Jozef Gregor Tajovský, Božena Slančíková-Timrava and others) while also encompassing international repertoire, particularly Russian, English and American drama. He has staged more than sixty productions. Notable works include his dramatisation of Timrava's The Death of Paľo Ročka (1995) and productions of Shakespeare, Ostrovsky, O'Neill, Ibsen, Goldoni and Wilde.

=== Television and film ===
For Slovak Television Oľha has directed television plays, documentaries and series, among them Ježova koža (1993), Dlhá cesta domov (1995), Storočie divadla v Černove (1995), Aurel Stodola (2001) and the seven-part series Slovenské rody: po stopách Turzovcov (2010). He appeared as an actor in the 1986 feature film Šiesta veta (directed by Štefan Uher).

=== Photography and writing ===
Oľha works as a theatre and documentary photographer for several Slovak theatres (Slovak Chamber Theatre Martin, Astorka Korzo '90, Alexander Duchnovič Theatre Prešov, Opera Banská Bystrica and others). He has held individual photography exhibitions. He is the author of two monographs on Slovak theatre personalities: Spovede divadelníkov (2016) and Divadlo a divadelníci (2018).

=== Academic career ===
Since 1999 Oľha has taught directing at the Faculty of Dramatic Arts of the Academy of Arts in Banská Bystrica. He held successive academic ranks (assistant professor, associate professor, professor) and administrative posts, including vice-dean, dean of the Faculty of Dramatic Arts, and, from 19 February 2008 to 20 February 2016, rector of the Academy (two consecutive terms). After his rectorship he served briefly as vice-rector. He continues to teach as a professor in the Department of Dramaturgy, Directing and Theatre Studies.

=== Arts Support Fund ===
In autumn 2024 Oľha became a member of the Board of the Arts Support Fund (Fond na podporu umenia). In March 2025, as the nominee of Culture Minister Martina Šimkovičová, he was elected chairman of the Board.

On 16 July 2026 employees of the Fund reported the discovery of listening devices in several offices. The matter was referred to the authorities. After a Board meeting on 22 July 2026 Oľha declined to answer any questions and ran away from the journalists. Video footage of the incident circulated widely and became a popular internet meme. On 23 July 2026 he announced his resignation as chairman, citing prolonged "media lynching," while stating that he would remain an ordinary member of the Board.

== Personal life ==
Oľha was married for 22 years to the actress Jana Oľhová; the marriage ended in 2005. They have six children: son Adam (born 1984) and daughters Mária (born 1988), Juliána (born 1991), Tereza, Eva and Hana. His second wife is Natália Oľhová, with whom he has a daughter, Tamara.

== Selected publications ==
- Spovede divadelníkov (2016)
- Divadlo a divadelníci (2018)
