= 52nd Karlovy Vary International Film Festival =

2017 film festival in the Czech Republic

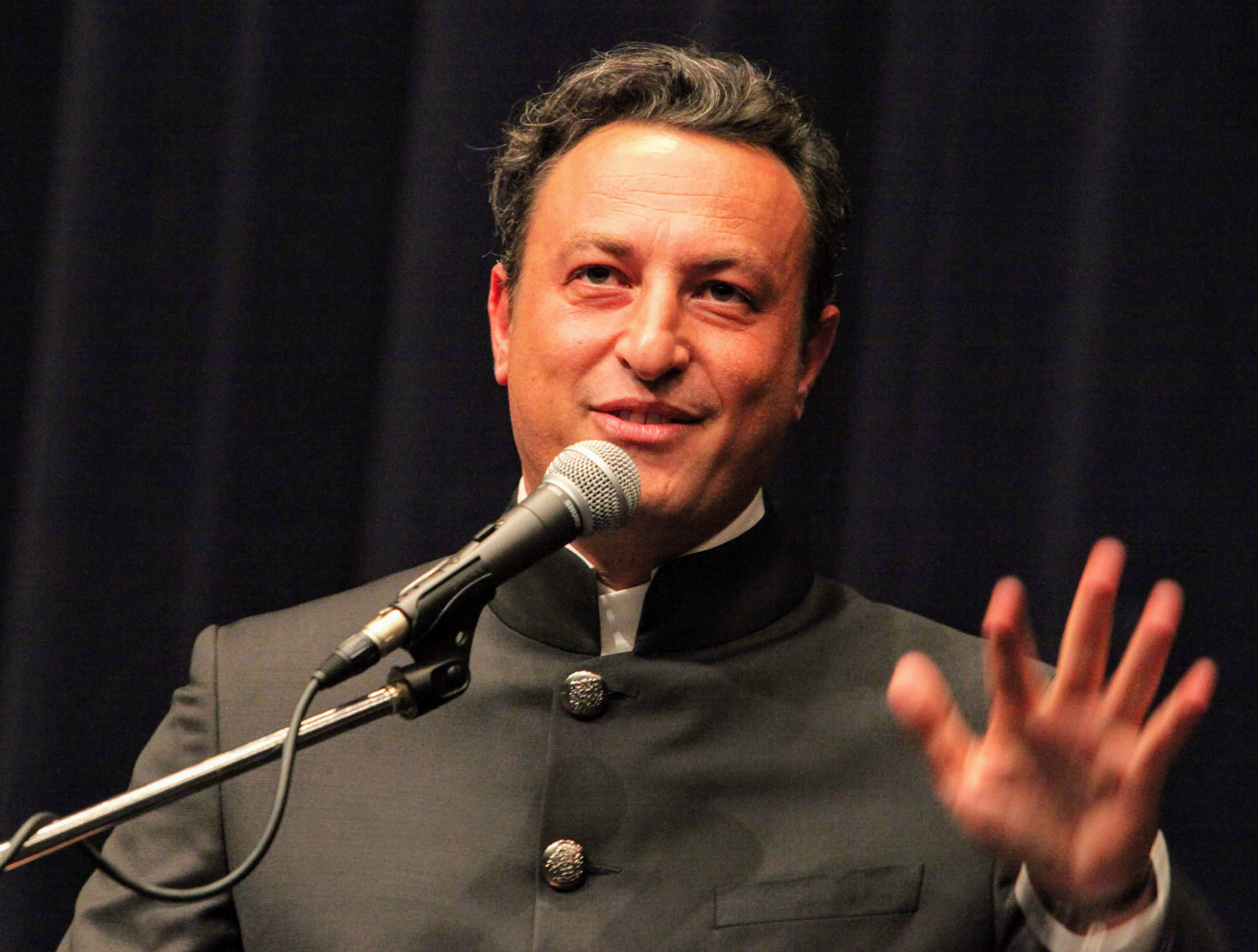
Onur Saylak

The 52nd Karlovy Vary International Film Festival took place from 30 June to 8 July 2017. The Crystal Globe was won by Little Crusader, a Czech historical drama film directed by Václav Kadrnka. The second prize, the Special Jury Prize was won by Men Don’t Cry, a Bosnian drama film directed by Alen Drljević.

== Juries ==
The following people formed the juries of the festival:

Main competition

- Anna Brüggemann (Germany)
- Sarah Flack (USA)
- Ciro Guerra (Columbia)
- Michel Merkt (Principality of Monaco)
- Štefan Uhrík (Czech Republic)

Documentaries

- Roberto Cueto (Spain)
- Anne Fabini (Germany)
- Pavla Janoušková Kubečková (Czech Republic)

East of the West

- Evrim Ersoy (Turkey)
- Cosima Finkbeiner (Germany)
- Rusudan Glurjidze (Georgia)
- Igor Soukmanov (Republic of Belarus)
- Karla Stojáková (Czech Republic)

== Official selection awards ==
The following feature films and people received the official selection awards:

- Crystal Globe (Grand Prix) - Little Crusader (Křižáček) by Václav Kadrnka (Czech Republic, Slovak Republic, Italy)
- Special Jury Prize - Men Don’t Cry (Muškarci ne plaču) by Alen Drljević (Bosnia and Herzegovina, Slovenia, Croatia, Germany)
- Best Director Award - Peter Bebjak for The Line (Čiara) (Slovak Republic, Ukraine)
- Best Actress Award (ex aequo) - Jowita Budnik & Eliane Umuhire for their roles in Birds Are Singing in Kigali (Ptaki śpiewają w Kigali) (Poland)
- Best Actor Award - Alexander Yatsenko for his role in Arrhythmia (Aritmiya) (Russia, Finland, Germany)
- Special Jury Mention (Best First Feature Film) - Keep the Change by Rachel Israel (USA)
- Special Jury Mention (Best Newcomer) - Voica Oltean for her role in Breaking News (Romania)

== Other statutory awards ==
Other statutory awards that were conferred at the festival:

- Best documentary film - Lots of Kids, a Monkey and a Castle (Muchos hijos, un mono y un castillo) by Gustavo Salmerón (Spain)
  - Special Jury Prize - Atelier de conversation by Bernhard Braunstein (Austria, France, Liechtenstein)
- East of the West Award - How Viktor "the Garlic" Took Alexey "the Stud" to the Nursing Home (Kak Vitka Chesnok vez Lecha Shtyrya v dom invalidov) by Alexander Hant (Russia)
  - Special Jury Prize - Dede by Mariam Khatchvani (Georgia, Qatar, Ireland, Netherlands, Croatia)
- Forum of Independents Award - Tangerine by Sean Baker (USA)
- Crystal Globe for Outstanding Artistic Contribution to World Cinema - Ken Loach (UK), Paul Laverty UK, James Newton Howard (USA)
- Festival President's Award - Uma Thurman (USA), Casey Affleck (USA), Jeremy Renner (USA)
- Festival President's Award for Contribution to Czech Cinematography -Václav Vorlíček (Czech Republic)
- Právo Audience Award - Wind River by Taylor Sheridan (USA)

== Non-statutory awards ==
The following non-statutory awards were conferred at the festival:

- FIPRESCI International Critics Award: Keep the Change by Rachel Israel (USA)
- Ecumenical Jury Award: The Cakemaker by Ofir Raul Graizer (Israel, Germany)
- FEDEORA Award (East of the West section): Mariţa by Cristi Iftime (Romania)
  - Special Mention: Blue Silence by Bülent Öztürk (Turkey, Belgium)
- Europa Cinemas Label: Men Don’t Cry (Muškarci ne plaču) by Alen Drljević (Bosnia and Herzegovina, Slovenia, Croatia, Germany)
