= Vedlejší produkt =

- Genre: Crime, Psychological, Drama
- Written by: Jakub Režný, Aleš Preis
- Directed by: Peter Bebjak
- Starring: Tomáš Maštalír; Martin Hofmann
- Country of origin: Czech Republic
- Original language: Czech
- No. of seasons: 1
- No. of episodes: 3

Production
- Production location: Ostrava
- Cinematography: Martin Žiaran
- Running time: 59 minutes
- Production company: DNA Production

Original release
- Network: ČT1
- Release: April 28 – May 12, 2024

Vedlejší produkt (Slovak: Vedľajší produkt English: Side Product) is a Czech-Slovak psychological crime drama miniseries directed by Peter Bebjak. It deals with the question of whether a murderer exposed by illegal methods should be prosecuted. The series is a thematical successor of Spravedlnost. The series is based on real events.

== Plot ==
Detective Josef from the Ostrava homicide department used illegal procedures to catch a brutal murderer. He was punished by being tasked to do an annual routine review of unsolved murders. This allows him to discovers a case of eighteen-year-old Eva who was strangled twenty years ago in her apartment.

There are sixteen days left before the statute of limitations for the murder. Josef and his colleague Michal decide to catch the killer at all cost before the statute expires. His desire to find the killer does not prevent him from using methods that are on the edge of the law. Josef himself says: "Detective work is like walking on thin ice... Well, sometimes the ice is not there at all."

== Cast ==
=== Main ===
- Tomáš Maštalír as Cpt. Mgr. Josef Krulich, elite investigator who becomes obsessed with catching a murderer who brutally killed eighteen-year-old Eva twenty years ago.
- Martin Hofmann as Cpt. Mgr. Michal Janoušek, investigator and Josef's partner
- Zuzana Stivínová as Col. Mgr. Petra Novotná, commander of department
- Jan Vondráček as Mjr. Mgr. Vladimír Míka, former investigator
- Albert Čuba as Cpt. bc. Miroslav Hlušák, investigator
- Johana Matoušková as Lt. bc. Lucie Růžičková, junior investigator
- Zbyšek Humpolec as Col. JUDr. Libor Malíček, internal affairs officer
- Jan Teplý as Col. JUDr. František Brabec, internal affairs officer
- Vladimír Hauser as MUDr. Rudolf Ondrák, medical examiner
- Tomáš Weber as Mgr. Luboš Chuděra, analyst
- Pavla Beretová as Mgr. Zita Pohorská, analyst
- Miroslav Etzler as JUDr. Živko Nikolić, criminal prosecutor
- Jan Hofman as Richard Málek, investigative journalist
- Magdaléna Borová as Monika Krulichová, Josef's wife
- Michal Gruml as Filip Krulich, son of Josef Krulich

=== Supporting and episodic ===
- Miroslav Rataj as František Svoboda
- Anna Cónová as Milena Svobodová
- Jaromíra Mílová as Apolena Dvorská
- Milan Němec as Emil Hociko
- Miroslav Navrátil as Dmitrij Golub
- Šimon Obdržálek as Kamil Hájek
- Patrik Vojtíšek as František Matinák
- Michal Sikora as Ivan Kočiš
- Mikuláš Křen as Julijan Novak
- Milan Mikulčík as Jaroslav Kovář
- Ján Jackuliak as Ivan Fojtík
- Zdeněk Julina as Jan Laufr
- Robert Hájek as Ladislav Konopka
- Jiří Hába as Karel Sikora

== Production ==
The series was filmed during autumn 2024 in Ostrava, Prague and in interior and exterior environments as a spiritual successor to 2017 series Spravedlnost. It is a project of Television Studio Ostrava.

There are 43 characters in the series while approximately 275 extras participated in filming. 3 real police officers, 3 security guards, 2 tram drivers, 2 real rescuers and 10 stuntmen also appeared in front of the camera. The most production-intensive scene was the explosion sequence in the cottage. In addition to the actors and crew members, firefighters, rescuers, stuntmen and special effects experts also took part in making of the scene.

Story is inspired by real events and real police work. Aleš Preis, one of writers previously worked as a police investigator. The series was produced by DNA Production and directed by Peter Bebjak.

== Episodes ==
No.	Title	Directed by	Written by	Original release date	Czech viewers (millions)
1	Episode 1	Peter Bebjak	Jakub Režný, Aleš Preis	April 28, 2024	1.011
2	Episode 2	Peter Bebjak	Jakub Režný, Aleš Preis	May 5, 2024	1.066
3	Episode 3	Peter Bebjak	Jakub Režný, Aleš Preis	May 12, 2024	0.928

== Reception ==
Vedlejší produkt was well received by audiences after broadcast of the first episode with many praising Hofmann's and Maštalír's performances. First episode was viewed by more than 1 million viewers beating competition that included miniseries Iveta. Second episode retained the position as it was viewed by 1.066 million viewers.
