= Elizaveta Maximová =

Czech actress (born 1992)

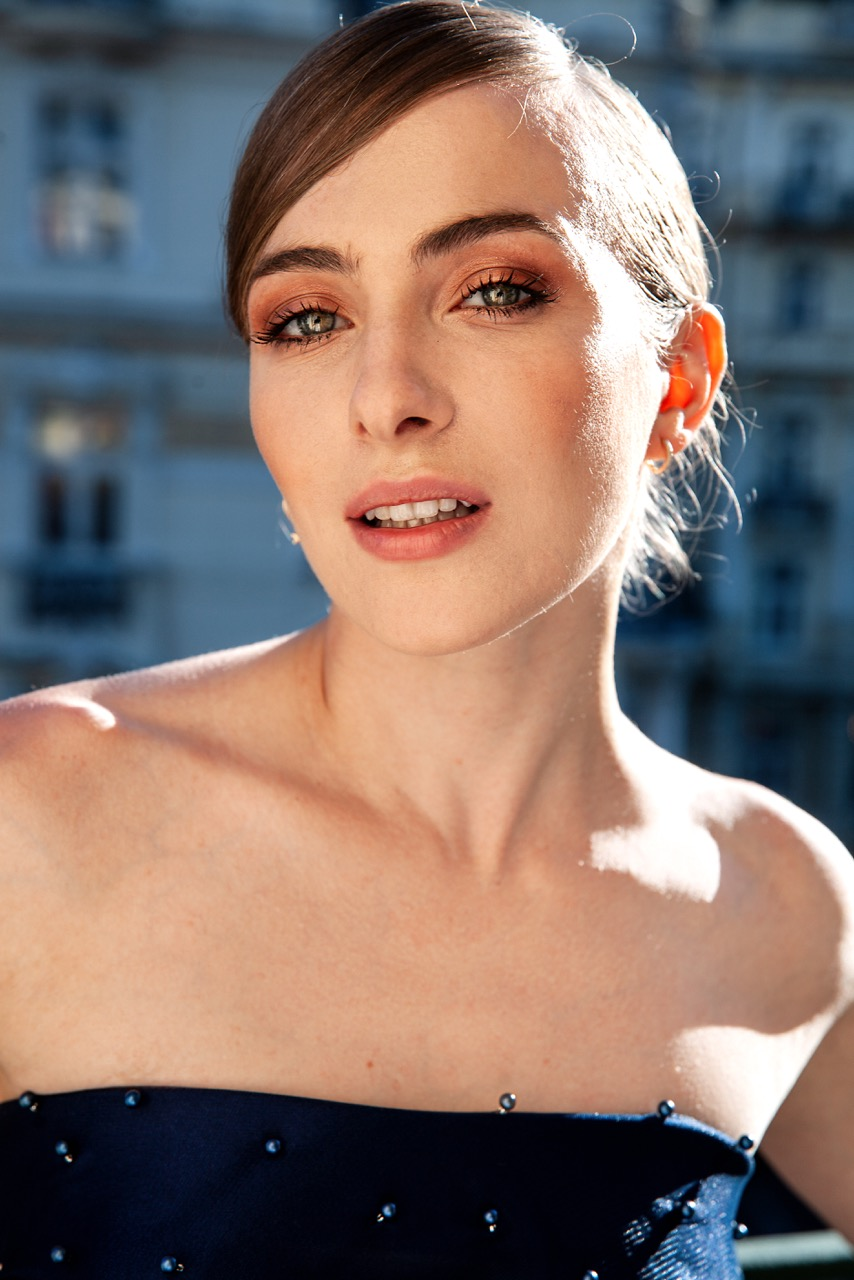
- Elizaveta Maximová (2018)
- Born: Elizaveta Maximovna Shvachko; 16 March 1992 (age 34); Kazan, Russia
- Education: Academy of Performing Arts in Prague
- Occupation: Actress
- Years active: 2015–present
- Website: elizavetamaximova.com

Elizaveta Maximová, born Elizaveta Maximovna Shvachko, (born 16 March 1992) is a Czech actress.

== Selected filmography ==
=== Films ===
- Droneman (2020)
- Je suis Karl (2021)
- Borders of Love (2022)
- Světýlka (2024)

=== TV series ===
- Trpaslík (2017)
- Spravedlnost (2017)
- Actor (2020)
- Stockholm Syndrome (2020)
- Božena (2021)
- Guru (2022)
- Chlap (2022)
- Podezření (2022)
- Docent (2023)
- Vlastně se nic nestalo (2024)
- Děcko (2025)
