= Vlastně se nic nestalo =

- Genre: Drama
- Written by: Jan Vejnar; Darja Miková
- Directed by: Jan Vejnar
- Starring: Denisa Barešová; Jiří Chadraba; Elizaveta Maximová
- Country of origin: Czech Republic
- Original language: Czech
- No. of seasons: 1
- No. of episodes: 6

Production
- Running time: 30 minutes

Original release
- Network: iVysílání
- Release: September 29, 2024

Vlastně se nic nestalo (No Big Deal) is a drama television series directed by Jan Vejnar starring Denisa Barešová, Elizaveta Maximová and Jiří Chadraba. It tackles topic of intimate life of young people influenced by social media. The series was presented at 58th Karlovy Vary International Film Festival and international festival of TV nas web series Serial Killer.

== Plot ==
Žofie and Andrea offer paid content on adult platforms. While Žofie tries to rebuild her damaged self-esteem after breaking up with Roman and experiment with these platforms, Andrea longs for financial freedom which moves her from her original goal of making a living by serious modeling. Žofie sees adult platforms as a kind of emancipation tool, while financial situation and demands of fans drive once famous Andrea deeper into darker waters of sex influencership.

== Cast ==
- Denisa Barešová as Žofie (4 episodes)
- Jiří Chadraba as Roman, Žofie's boyfriend (3 episodes)
- Elizaveta Maximová as Andrea (4 episodes)
- Jiří Panzner as Dan (2 episodes)
- Robert Hájek as Patrik (2 episodes)
- Simona Lewandowska as Nicola (1 episode)
- Lukáš Hejlík as Boss Ráďa (2 episodes)

== Episodes ==
No.	Title	Written by	Original release date	Original air date (ČT1)	Czech viewers (millions)
1	"Návštěva"	Jan Vejnar, Darja Miková	29 September 2024	TBA	N/A
2	"Volný pád"	Jan Vejnar, Darja Miková	29 September 2024	TBA	N/A
3	"Odpojený muž"	Jan Vejnar, Darja Miková	29 September 2024	TBA	N/A
4	"Side Hustle"	Jan Vejnar, Darja Miková	29 September 2024	TBA	N/A
5	"Kinky Popelka"	Jan Vejnar, Darja Miková	29 September 2024	TBA	N/A
6	"Retreat"	Jan Vejnar, Darja Miková	29 September 2024	TBA	N/A
