= Milena Jelinek =

Czech American screenwriter (1935–2020)

- Milena Jelínková
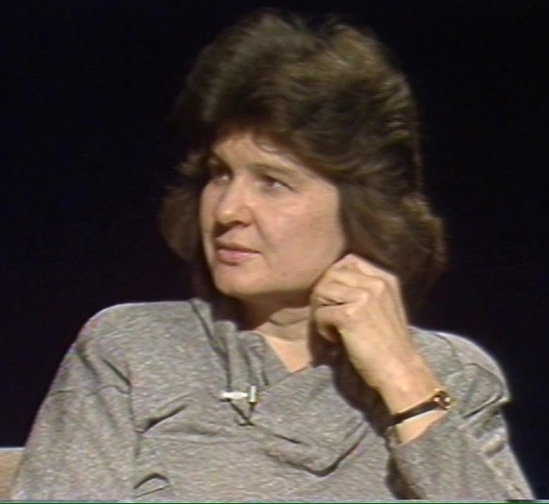
- Jelinek on CUNY TV's Cinema Then, Cinema Now (1986)
- Born: Tobolová; August 19, 1935; Přeštice, Czech Republic
- Died: April 15, 2020 (aged 84); New York
- Education: Film and TV School of the Academy of Performing Arts in Prague
- Occupations: Screenwriter, playwright and teacher
- Spouse: Frederick Jelinek
- Writing career
- Notable work: Forgotten Light
- Notable awards: Three Czech Lions
- Literary movement: Czech New Wave

Milena Jelinek (Czech: Milena Jelínková, née Tobolová; August 19, 1935 – April 15, 2020) was a Czech American screenwriter, playwright and teacher. She wrote the screenplay for the film Forgotten Light, which was awarded three Czech Lions in 1997. Her name is associated with the golden generation of Czech filmmakers, known as Czech New Wave. She was married to the late researcher Frederick Jelinek.

== Biography ==
Jelinek was born on 19 August 1935 in Přeštice, near Plzeň. From 1955, she studied at the Film and TV School of the Academy of Performing Arts in Prague. The film director Ivan Passer was one of her classmates, and the writer Milan Kundera was her literature teacher. One of her early screenplays, written under her maiden name and titled Snadný život (An Easy Life), was filmed by Miloš Makovec and Jiří Brdečka. Already during her studies, she took part in various anti-communist protests. According to her own words, the Czechoslovak president Antonín Novotný in a speech against "unreliable writers" even listed her name as a "subversive person".

Frederick Jelinek emigrated from Czechoslovakia to the United States in 1949, however, in 1957 he visited Vienna as a participant of a professional conference. During his stay, he decided to visit his old friends in Prague. He met and befriended Milena Tobolová during a meeting with the film director Miloš Forman in a Prague café. Gradually, they became close and eventually they decided to marry. However, their application for marriage was denied on several occasions by communist authorities. In 1960, Frederick Jelinek was proclaimed "persona non grata" in Czechoslovakia and his planned visits were banned permanently. Coincidentally, the same year Tobolová received permission by the government to leave the country. Her son William Jelinek later claimed: "As an inaugural gift to Kennedy, the Czechs released nine dissidents and one of them was my mother". In January, 1961, she left for the US and shortly after that she married Jelinek.

In the US, she gradually managed to find a place in the world of film, mainly thanks to another émigré, filmmaker František Daniel. She already knew him from the school in Prague, and met him again at the American Film Institute in Los Angeles. In 1980, she joined him and began teaching screenwriting at the Columbia University in New York. At the University, she spent a major part of her professional career.

She is the author of the script for the play Adina, staged in 2007 in the Vinohrady Theatre, Prague. The play depicts the life story of the renowned Czech pre-War actor Adina Mandlová.

Jelinek also wrote the libretto for the opera Kafka's Women by Czech composer Jiří Kadeřábek, first staged at the Cell Theater in New York City in 2013.

For the screenplay for the film Zapomenuté světlo (Forgotten Light), she found an inspiration in a short story by the Czech Catholic priest and writer Jakub Deml. Forgotten Light received seven Czech Lion nominations, including one for Best Screenplay, however, the Czech Film and Television Academy awarded the film three Lions for Best Actor, Best Supporting Actress and Best Sound.

She died in New York on 15 April 2020 of complications from COVID-19, aged 84.
