= Přeštice =

- Town
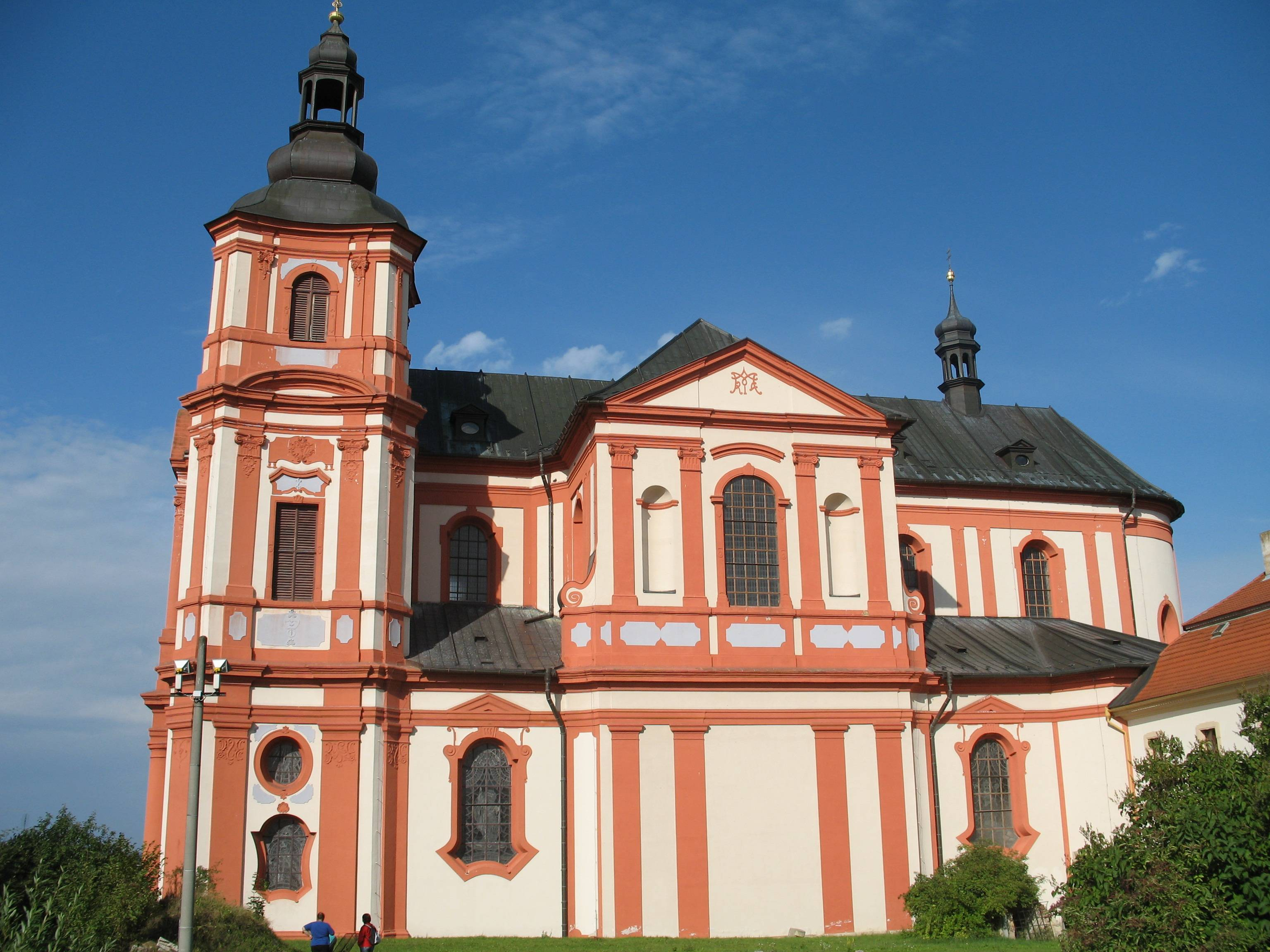
- Church of the Assumption of the Virgin Mary

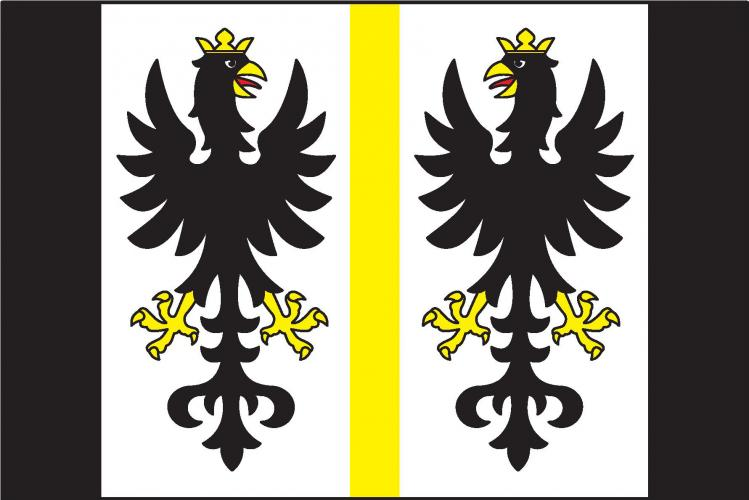
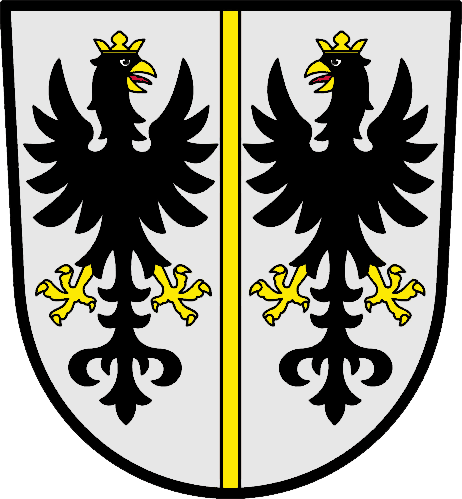
- Flag Coat of arms

- Location in the Czech Republic
- Coordinates: 49°34′23″N 13°19′57″E
- Country: Czech Republic
- Region: Plzeň
- District: Plzeň-South
- First mentioned: 1226

Government
  - Mayor: Tomáš Chmelík

Area
  - Total: 25.41 km^{2} (9.81 sq mi)
- Elevation: 345 m (1,132 ft)

Population (2026-01-01)
  - Total: 6,757
  - Density: 265.9/km^{2} (688.7/sq mi)
- Time zone: UTC+1 (CET)
  - Summer (DST): UTC+2 (CEST)
- Postal code: 334 01
- Website: www.prestice-mesto.cz

Přeštice (Czech pronunciation: [ˈpr̝̊ɛʃcɪtsɛ]; German: Prestitz) is a town in Plzeň-South District in the Plzeň Region of the Czech Republic. It has about 6,800 inhabitants. The town is located on the Úhlava River, on the border between the Švihov Highlands and Plasy Uplands.

Přeštice was founded in the 13th century at the latest and became a town in 1590. The most important monument in the town is the Church of the Assumption of the Virgin Mary, protected as a national cultural monument.

== Administrative division ==
Přeštice consists of four municipal parts (in brackets population according to the 2021 census):

- Přeštice (5,818)
- Skočice (408)
- Zastávka (132)
- Žerovice (233)

== Etymology ==
The name Přeštice (in Old Czech written as Přeščice) is derived from the personal name Přeška, meaning "the village of Přeška's people".

== Geography ==
Přeštice is located about 18 kilometres (11 mi) south of Plzeň. It lies on the border between the Švihov Highlands and Plasy Uplands. The highest point is the hill Střížov at 522 m (1,713 ft) above sea level. The Úhlava River flows through the town.

== History ==
The first written mention of Přeštice is in a deed of King Ottokar II from 1226, when it was referred to as a market village. In 1239, the village was bought by the monastery in Kladruby. During the Hussite Wars (1419–1434), Přeštice was acquired by the Švihovský z Rýzmberk family, who owned it for two centuries. Přeštice was promoted to a town in 1590.

In the early 19th century, Přeštice was badly damaged by a large fire, but the town recovered. The construction of the road from Plzeň to Klatovy, which began to be built in 1809, contributed to the development of the town. The new town hall was built in 1832. In 1874, the Plzeň–Klatovy railway was put into operation.

== Demographics ==
Historical population

Year	Pop.	±%
1869	3,388	—
1880	4,110	+21.3%
1890	4,091	−0.5%
1900	4,451	+8.8%
1910	4,783	+7.5%

Year	Pop.	±%
1921	4,683	−2.1%
1930	5,326	+13.7%
1950	5,113	−4.0%
1961	5,520	+8.0%
1970	5,724	+3.7%

Year	Pop.	±%
1980	6,769	+18.3%
1991	6,382	−5.7%
2001	6,453	+1.1%
2011	7,275	+12.7%
2021	6,591	−9.4%

Source: Censuses

== Transport ==
The I/27 road (the section from Plzeň to Klatovy, part of the European route E53) runs through the town.

Přeštice is located on the railway line Prague–Klatovy via Plzeň.

== Sights ==
The main landmark of Přeštice is the Church of the Assumption of the Virgin Mary. It was built in the late Baroque style in 1750–1775 and was designed by Kilian Ignaz Dientzenhofer. It is the largest Baroque church in the Czech Republic outside Prague and is protected as a national cultural monument.

== Notable people ==
- Jakub Jan Ryba (1765–1815), composer
- Josef Hlávka (1831–1908), architect and philanthropist
- Milena Jelinek (1935–2020), Czech-American screenwriter and playwright

== Twin towns – sister cities ==
Přeštice is twinned with:

- Chadron, United States
- Krško, Slovenia
- Nittenau, Germany
