= Lajka =

- Directed by: Aurel Klimt
- Screenplay by: Aurel Klimt, Martin Velíšek
- Produced by: Aurel Klimt
- Music by: Marek Doubrava
- Production company: Studio Zvon
- Distributed by: A-Company Czech
- Release date: 2 November 2017
- Running time: 85 minutes
- Country: Czech Republic
- Language: Czech
- Budget: 58 million CZK

Lajka (in English: Laika) is a 2017 Czech science fiction comedy animated film. It is inspired by Soviet space dog Laika.

== Plot ==
In the Soviet town of Baikonur, Kazakhstan, a female husky/terrier mix that lives in the streets is captured while scavenging for food to feed her puppies. She is named Laika and brought to the local spaceport. Professor Voroljov and his assistant Kokotov begin preparing Laika for space travel. On the day before the launch, Laika manages to get out of her cage and visits the space rocket. Then she returns for her puppies and smuggles them into the rocket.

The following day she is launched into space along with her puppies hidden in the rocket. The news of Laika's travel to space arrive to the United States. In response, they send a chimpanzee named Ham to space. Ham is soon followed by other rockets with various animals.

All rockets arrive at a planet named Qem. They meet the natives of the planet and are accompanied by a native named Quirkrk. The animals are happy in the new environment as there are no humans. The Soviets however soon send cosmonaut Jurij Levobočkin to space. He is initially sent to the Moon but arrives at Qem instead. He then meets Lajka, and settles down, but soon begins craving meat. Qem's natives soon go missing; it is revealed that Levobočkin invented a "freezer gun" and is hunting and eating them. Laika and Ham are fighting him just as he is about to bake Quirkrk. The clash ends when Levobočkin falls into the furnace, and the animals leave. Levobočkin, however, survives, now wanting revenge, and the animals prepare for battle against him. The American astronaut Neil Knokaut arrives and eventually joins Levobočkin in hunting. Laika outsmarts them and Levobočkin and Knokaut freeze each other.

== Voice actors ==
- Helena Dvořáková as Laika
- Karel Zima as Jurij Levobočkin
- Petr Čtvrtníček as Quirkrk
- Jan Vondráček as Ham
- Miroslav Táborský as Neil Knokaut
- Robert Nebřenský as Professor Voroljov
- Jan Budař as Assistant Kokotov

== Awards ==
- 2017 Czech Lion Awards, Stage Design category winner

== See also ==
- List of animated feature-length films
