= Milada (film) =

2017 Czech biographical film

- Directed by: David Mrnka
- Written by: David Mrnka, Robert J. Conant
- Starring: Ayelet Zurer
- Cinematography: Martin Štrba
- Music by: Aleš Březina, Drew Allen
- Production company: Loaded Vision Entertainment
- Release date: 2 November 2017
- Running time: 130 minutes
- Countries: Czech Republic; United States
- Language: English

Milada is a 2017 Czech biographical film written, produced and directed by David Mrnka. Produced in the English language, it stars Israeli actress Ayelet Zurer as Milada Horáková. The film was a Czech-American co-production by Loaded Vision Entertainment. The movie follows the life of Milada Horáková (1901–1950), a politician who was hanged by the Communist Party of Czechoslovakia on fabricated charges of conspiracy and treason.

The film won two Czech Lions (costume design; makeup and hairstyling).

== Cast ==
- Ayelet Zurer as Milada Horáková
- Robert Gant as Bohuslav Horák
- Daniel Rchichev (age 6), Karina Rchichev (age 13) and Taťjana Medvecká (age 57) as Jana Horáková
- Vica Kerekes as Milada's sister Věra
- Igor Orozovič as Věra's husband
- Jaromír Dulava as Milada's father
- Marián Mitaš as Karel Šváb
- Vladimír Javorský as Alois Schmidt
- Dagmar Bláhová as Františka Plamínková
- Anna Geislerová as Ludmila Brožová-Polednová
