= Surviving Life =

- Theatrical release poster
- Directed by: Jan Švankmajer
- Written by: Jan Švankmajer
- Produced by: Jaromír Kallista
- Starring: Václav Helšus; Klára Issová; Zuzana Kronerová; Emília Došeková; Daniela Bakerová
- Cinematography: Jan Růžička; Juraj Galvánek
- Edited by: Marie Zemanová
- Music by: Alexandr Glazunov; Jan Kalinov
- Production companies: Athanor; C-GA Film
- Distributed by: Bontonfilm
- Release dates: 7 September 2010 (Venice Film Festival); 4 November 2010 (Czech Republic)
- Running time: 109 minutes
- Countries: Czech Republic; Slovakia
- Language: Czech
- Budget: 35 million Kč

Surviving Life (Czech: Přežít svůj život) is a 2010 Czech comedy film by Jan Švankmajer, starring Václav Helšus, Klára Issová and Zuzana Kronerová. The film uses a mix of cutout animation from photographs and live-action segments, and tells the story of a married man who lives a double life in his dreams, where he meets another woman. It premiered out of competition at the 67th Venice International Film Festival.

== Plot ==
The movie opens with a self-deprecating introduction by director Jan Svankmajer, apologizing for the fact that the film is not live-action but rather created through paper cutout animation.

Evžen carries a gigantic egg through the city, dropping it upon being approached by a lady who mistakes him for a man named Milan. Evžen and the woman, Eva, talk and agree to get coffee together. However, Evžen is awoken in bed by his wife, Milada, revealing that the encounter was merely a dream.

Mesmerized by the lady, Evžen seeks to see her again. He overeats to trigger dreaming at the advice of a coworker, making himself ill. Once asleep, he reencounters the woman, now going by Eliza. He comes with her to her dwellings to dance and observes that she has scars on her wrists from a suicide attempt. Other inhabitants of the dream realm he meets during his sojourns include Eliza’s son Peter, an elderly homeless woman representing the superego, and Peter’s father Milan, who looks identical to Evžen.

Evžen begins to see psychoanalyst Dr. Holubová, who examines his dreams through the lens of Freud and Jung. Returning to the dreamland, he finds that Peter has completely vanished and the dream woman, now named Emily, has no memory of her son. Evžen is confronted over the disappearance by Milan, who trips over Peter’s blocks and dies upon striking his head.

The real world and Evžen’s dream increasingly blur together. He begins to research lucid dreaming and buys a book about it using money he acquired from winning the lottery in his dreams. At work, he is fired for reading on the job. Evžen goes through his deceased mother’s old things and finds items Emily also owns, including a red dress and a crocodile-skin bag. By mimicking what he has read, he discovers how to induce himself to enter the dream world every time he sleeps. He starts to rent a private apartment so that he may dream uninterrupted. For many nights, he returns to his dream lady, who has settled on the name Evženie. The two have a child together.

Milada suspects Evžen of adultery and stalks him to Holubová’s. Confronting the doctor after Evžen leaves, Milada discovers the parallel life her husband leads in his sleep. She traverses the dream world herself to meet Evženie and berates her for stealing Evžen.

Evžen spies a photograph of Evženie, Peter, and Milan in the real world. Tracking down the photographer, Fikejz, Evžen pieces together that it is a picture of himself and his family when he was young. His father died as Milan did, and his mother slit her wrists in the bath.

Returning home, Milada gives Evžen a choice between Evženie and her. Picking Evženie, he goes to sleep. Evžen dreams that a giant Evženie has sliced open her wrists in a massive bathtub. He begins to weep. Evženie places him in the bath and teaches him how to swim in the bloody water, saying he must learn to do so if he is to survive life.

== Cast ==
- Václav Helšus as Evžen and Milan
- Klára Issová as Evženie
- Zuzana Kronerová as Milada
- Emília Došeková as super-ego
- Daniela Bakerová as Dr. Holubová
- Marcel Němec as colleague
- Jan Počepický as antiquarian
- Jana Oľhová as prostitute
- Pavel Nový as janitor
- Karel Brožek as boss
- Miroslav Vrba as Fikejz

== Production ==
The film was co-produced by Athanor and the Slovak company C-GA Film, with participation of Czech Television and UPP. It received eight million korun from the Czech State Fund for Support and Development of Cinematography and around six million korun from Eurimages. Additional support was granted by the MEDIA Programme. The production involved a total budget of 35 million korun. Animation work was done by an international team at Švankmajer's studio in Knovíz, just outside Prague. The film uses Alexander Glazunov's Concert Waltz No.1 in D, op 47 as opening and ending theme.

== Release ==
Surviving Life premiered on 7 September 2010 out of competition at the 67th Venice International Film Festival. It was subsequently shown at several festivals including the London Film Festival. Bontonfilm released it in the Czech Republic on 4 November 2010.

== Reception ==
Deborah Young of The Hollywood Reporter called Švankmajer a "grand master not just of innovative animation techniques but of life itself", and wrote that the director "is at the height of his filmmaking powers as director, artistic director and storyteller here." Young also noted, however, that the film's complex narrative and unconventional imagery "will not be everyone's cup of tea." Variety editor Leslie Felperin complimented the chemistry between Helšus and Issová, and noted how the film was more similar to Czech mainstream comedies than what normally would be expected from the director: "For all the grotesquerie on display (and there's hardly anything here as disturbing as Svankmajer's imagery in Alice from 1988), pic feels much lighter in tone than the helmer's last few films, such as Lunacy, Greedy Guts (aka Little Otik), or Conspirators of Pleasure."

Švankmajer won the Czech Lion for Best Art Direction for the film. It was also nominated for Best Director and Best Sound.
