= Spravedlnost (miniseries) =

Czech crime television series

- Genre: Crime, Psychological
- Written by: Tomáš Bombík, Peter Bebjak
- Directed by: Peter Bebjak
- Starring: Ondřej Vetchý
- Country of origin: Czech Republic
- Original language: Czech
- No. of seasons: 1
- No. of episodes: 3

Production
- Producer: Kateřina Ondřejková
- Running time: 75 minutes
- Production company: D.N.A. production

Original release
- Network: ČT1
- Release: March 12 – March 29, 2017

Spravedlnost (Slovak: Spravodlivosť, 'Absolution, Justice') is a Czech crime television series. It tells the story of police investigator Richard who investigates the murder of a prominent judge which was committed by his daughter, Lily. The first episode premiered on 12 March 2017. It was directed by Peter Bebjak. Ondřej Vetchý, who stars in the series, collaborated with Bebjak on Případy 1. oddělení.

Spravedlnost received the Czech Lion Award for the Best Television Film or Miniseries of 2017.

== Plot ==
Richard is a police investigator who has not seen his daughter Lily in a very long time. The series starts when Lily shows up at his door and asks for help. She tells him that she has fallen in love with Judge Kowalský, but he attacked her and she killed him in self-defense. Richard decides to help her at all costs. Richard becomes the lead investigator in the case of Kowalský's murder.

== Cast ==
- Ondřej Vetchý as Richard Koller, the series protagonist. He is a chief investigator whose team is assigned a murder case committed by his daughter. He tries to save her even at the cost of his career.
- Martin Finger as Tomáš Lohnický, Richard's colleague who investigates the murder committed by Lily and who suspects Richard.
- Elizaveta Maximová as Lily Kollerová, Richard's daughter who commits a murder.
- Jan Plouhar as Matěj Pospíšil
- Jitka Schneiderová as Monika Lohnická
- Kristýna Boková as Pospíšilová
- Lukáš Vaculík as Miroslav Dostál
- Aleš Bílík as Vojta Hájek
- Ondřej Malý as Radek Hrdlíř, a journalist
- Veronika Jeníková as Ludmila Dostálová
- Lenka Krobotová as Kamila Kowalská
- Dušan Urban as a taxi driver Roman
- Štěpán Kozub as Marek

== Production ==
The series was shot during the spring of 2016, starting in Ostrava. Other shooting places included Prague or Skuhrov.

== Episodes ==
No.	Title	Directed by	Written by	Original release date	Czech viewers (millions)
1	"Spravedlnost"	Peter Bebjak	Tomáš Bombík, Peter Bebjak	March 12, 2017	0.714
2	"Spravedlnost"	Peter Bebjak	Tomáš Bombík, Peter Bebjak	March 19, 2017	0.705
3	"Spravedlnost"	Peter Bebjak	Tomáš Bombík, Peter Bebjak	March 26, 2017	0.692

== Reception ==
The series competed for an audience with Temný kraj by TV Prima and with the third series of the entertainment show Tvoje tvář má známý hlas by TV Nova. Each episode gathered around 700,000 viewers the age over 15, which was also the limit of audience accessibility of the show.

According to Martin Svoboda, reviewer at Aktuálně.cz, the overall miniseries is "more successful than its problematic first part". He gave it a rating of 65%. According to him, it is also worthy of praise, in contrast to the richness of motifs common elsewhere; "[in] Justice, one and the same motif appears repeatedly, only the backdrops differ. Thanks to this, the creators can go deeper and uncover new corners of a single idea.”

The series won the 2017 Czech Lion Award in the "Best Television Film or Miniseries" category.

== Future ==
Entertainment One Television Production acquired the rights to produce a remake of the miniseries.

The miniseries Vedlejší produkt, a thematic successor to Spravedlnost was broadcast in 2024. Vedlejší produkt and Spravedlnost are linked by the themes of crime and punishment. Both series are directed by Peter Bebjak, while Kateřina Ondřejková serves as creative producer.
