= Buko (film) =

- Directed by: Alice Nellis
- Written by: Alice Nellis
- Produced by: Petr Fořt
- Starring: Anna Cónová
- Music by: Jan Ponocný
- Distributed by: Cinemart
- Release date: 29 September 2022 (Czech Republic)
- Running time: 112 minutes
- Country: Czech Republic
- Language: Czech
- Budget: 27 Million KČ

Buko is a 2022 Czech comedy drama film starring Anna Cónová. Directed and written by Alice Nellis, it tells story of a search and need for freedom on a farm. The title role was played by eponymous domestic horse. The film premiered on 7 July 2022 at the 56th Karlovy Vary International Film Festival. Cinemart released the film in theatres on 29 September 2022.

== Plot ==
Jarmila is dealing with a dilemma: She has to face a decision on how to deal with the end of her life. She can spend it either as a patient waiting for the end or with a personal rebellion in the form of a quite unexpected adventure. Retired circus horse named Buko unexpectedly enters her life and this change for Jarmila represents a step towards the desired mental freedom.

== Cast ==
- Anna Cónová as Jarmila Šestáková
- Miroslav Krobot as Antonín Šesták, Jarmila's husband
- Petra Špalková as Tamara, Jarmila's daughter
- Jan Cina as Tomáš, Jarmila's son
- Martha Issová as Tereza, autistic librarian
- Lenka Termerová as Tereza's mother
- Martin Kubačák as Karel, farmer
- Jana Oľhová as Karel's mother
- Martin Šulík
- Filip Menzel
- Marian Roden

== Awards ==
For her role as Tereza, Martha Issová received her first Czech Lion Award for Best Supporting Actress, which she dedicated to autistic people.
