= Monika Hilmerová =

Slovak actress

- Born: October 7, 1974 (age 52); Bratislava, Czechoslovakia
- Occupation: actress
- Years active: 1984-present
- Employer(s): RND, Bratislava (1990-2003); SND, Bratislava (2003-2006); SND, Bratislava (2008-present)
- Organization: VŠMU, Bratislava
- Spouse: Jaroslav Bekr (2009-present)
- Children: Zara (b. 2009); Leonard (b. 2013)
- Awards: Golfinho de Prata (2001); OTO Awards (2012)
- Website: Slovak National Theater

Monika Hilmerová (Slovak pronunciation: [ˈmɔnika ˈɦilmerɔʋaː]), born October 7, 1974, in Bratislava, is a Slovak actress. She is a winner of the 2001 Silver Dolphin award at the annual Festroia International Film Festival in Setúbal, Portugal for Best Actress for her performance in Der Lebensborn - Pramen života (English: Spring of Life, 2000).

Hilmerová is multilingual and has acted in Czech, Slovak, English and German. Among others, she co-starred in the Golden Globe-nominated Uprising (2001) by Jon Avnet, Silvio Soldini's movie Brucio nel vento (2002) (e.g. Nastro d'Argento award, BM IFF award and/or Flaiano FF award) and the U.S. Emmy Award-winning TV-miniseries Frankenstein (2004) by Kevin Connor. In March 2010, the actress was named a UNICEF Goodwill Ambassador.

== Biography ==
She studied andragogy at the Faculty of Arts, Comenius University, while also studying acting at the Academy of Performing Arts in Bratislava. She began acting on stage at 16 years of age at the Naive Theatre Radošina, and later joined the Slovak National Theatre in 2003. She is married to Jaroslav Bekr, a dancer and choreographer, with whom she has two children.

== Filmography ==
=== Feature films ===
Year	Title	Director
1984	O sláve a tráve	Peter Solan
2000	Oběti a vrazi	Andrea Sedláčková
2000	Spring of Life - Pramen života	Milan Cieslar
2002	Brucio nel vento	Silvio Soldini
2003	51 KHz^{[A]}	Julius Ševčík
2003	Bloodlines	Robb Williamson
2007	Svatba na bitevním poli aneb Hodiny před slávou	Dušan Klein
2007	Rozhovor s nepriateľom	Patrik Lančarič
2008	Báthory	Juraj Jakubisko
2009	Suplent	Martin Krejčí
2013	Candidate - Kandidát	Jonáš Karásek

=== Television ===
Year	Title	Director
1989	Omyly tradičnej morálky	Ľubo Kocka
1990	Citové cvičenia	Laco Halama
1991	Anorexia mentalis	Ľuba Vančíková
1993	Výlety v pamäti	Juraj Nvota
1995	Dobrá správa^{[A]}	Anton Popovič
1995	Chichôtka	Cyril Králik
1995	Zuzka Turanová	Ľubomír Paulovič
1996	Čierna ovca	Juraj Nvota
1996	Modrá ruža	Milan Lasica
1996	Ženský vtip	Jozef Banyák
1997	V zajatí lásky	Jozefína Šujanová
1998	A ešte dve frašky...	Emil Horváth Jr
1998	Kovladov dar	Ján Chlebík
1998	Svetlo	Igor Kováč
1998	Všetci sú za dverami^{[E]}	Milan Lasica
1999	Prstene pre dámu	Yvonne Vavrová
2000	Ako divé husi^{[B]}	Martin Ťapák
2001	Uprising	Jon Avnet
2001	Voľnomyšlienkár	Peter Mikulík
2001	Vohnice a Kiliján	Věra Plívová-Šimková
2001	Strieborná Háta	Drahomíra Reňáková-Králová
2004	Frankenstein^{[B]}	Kevin Connor
2004	Trautmann (Season 2)	Thomas Roth
2007	Cudzia žena a muž pod posteľou^{[C]}	Vladimír Strnisko
2007	Světla pasáže^{[B]}	Jaromír Polišenský
2007	Ordinácia v ružovej záhrade^{[B]}	various
2007	Trapasy^{[B]}	various
2008	Devatenáct klavírů	Dušan Klein
2010	Keby bolo keby (Season 2)^{[B]}	Tomáš Jančo
2010	Nesmrteľní	various
2011	Hoď svišťom^{[D]}	Michal Vajdička
2012	Partička^{[B]}^{[F]}	Dano Dangl
2012	Búrlivé víno^{[B]}	various

Notes

- A Denotes a short film.
- B Denotes a TV-series.
- C Denotes a televised theatre play.
- D Denotes a TV sitcom.
- E Denotes a talk show.
- F Denotes a reality show.

== Awards ==
Year	Nominated work	Award	Category	Result
Cinema
2001	Der Lebensborn – Pramen života	Festróia IFF – Silver Dolphin	Best Actress	Won
Television
2011	Herself	OTO Awards	TV Female Actor – Comedy	Nominated
2012	Herself	OTO Awards	TV Female Actor	Won
2013	Herself	OTO Awards	TV Female Actor	Nominated
2014	Herself	OTO Awards	TV Female Actor	Nominated
2015	Herself	OTO Awards	TV Female Actor	Nominated
Note: The years are listed in order of the respective calendar years; the annual ceremonies are usually held the next.

== Discography ==
- 2008: Veľkí herci spievajú malým deťom II, CD compilation by various artists (including a book); ISBN 978-80-969830-1-8
