= Veronika Žilková =

Czech actress

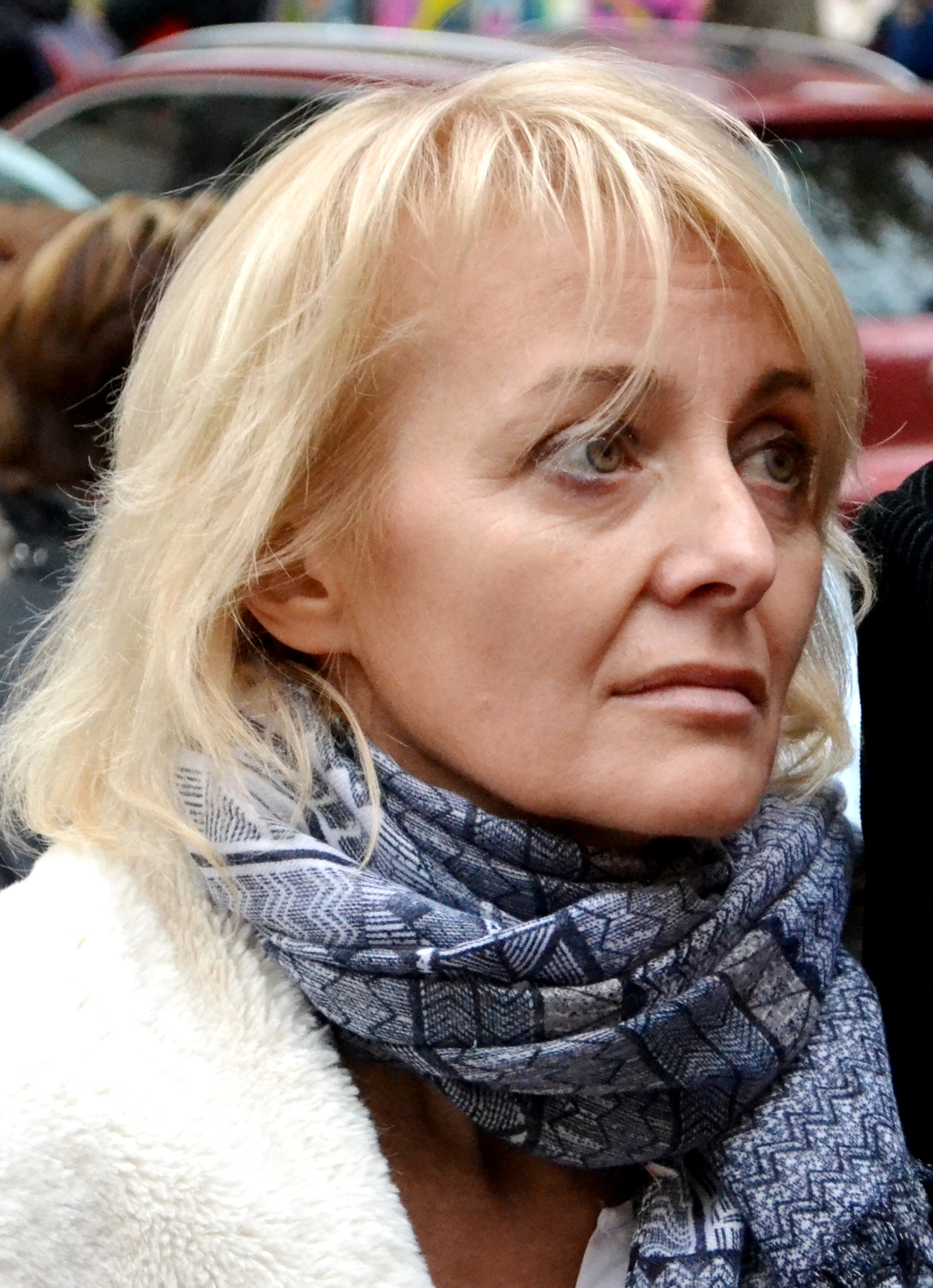
- Žilková in Prague (2015)
- Born: 16 October 1961 (age 64); Prague, Czechoslovakia
- Occupation: Actress
- Years active: 1980–present
- Spouses: Jiří Hanych (m. 1984–1988); Marek Navrátil (m. 1988–2005); Martin Stropnický (m. 2008–2023)
- Children: 7

Veronika Žilková (born 16 October 1961 in Prague) is a Czech actress.

She played the part of Božena Horáková in the 2000 Czech film, Little Otik also known as Otesánek. In 1997 she received the Czech Lion Award as the best supporting actress for her role in Zapomenuté světlo (Forgotten Light).

== Theatre ==
=== The Drama Club, Prague ===
- The Toth Family .... Ágika (István Örkény)
- A Midsummer Night's Sex Comedy (1993) .... Ariel (Woody Allen)
- Le Mariage de Figaro (play) (1994) .... Countess (Pierre-Augustin Caron de Beaumarchais)
- Killer Joe (1996) .... Sharla Smith, waitress in the bar "Cosmic Love" (Tracy Letts)
- Třetí zvonění .... Růžena (Václav Štech)
- Letní byt (1999) .... Rosina (Carlo Goldoni)
- Portgualie (2001) .... woman (Zoltán Egressy)
