= Candidate (2013 film) =

- Maroš Hečko
- Directed by: Jonas Karasek
- Written by: Maroš Hečko and Michal Havran
- Produced by: Maroš Hečko
- Starring: Marek Majeský
- Cinematography: Tomáš Juríček
- Edited by: Matej Beneš
- Music by: Matúš Široký
- Release date: October 10, 2013 (Slovakia)
- Running time: 106 minutes
- Countries: Slovakia; Czech Republic
- Language: Slovak
- Budget: 120 000 eur

Candidate (Slovak: Kandidát) is a 2013 Czecho-Slovak film. It was directed by Jonáš Karásek. It premiered in October 2013. It is a political thriller that includes references toward corruption scandals in Slovak politics, notably the Gorilla scandal.

It was the most visited Slovak film of 2013.

== Plot ==
The film is about the Slovak presidential election. It is narrated by Blonďáčik, who is, along with his Czech partner Jazva, tasked to watch a rich businessman and lobbyist Adam Lambert. Lambert owns an advertising agency and is asked by an influential bishop Josef to manage presidential campaign of an unknown candidate Peter Potôň who can take some votes from opposition candidates. He reluctantly agrees but when he finds out that his rival Ivan Müller is a campaign manager of minister Černohorský who is the front runner in the election, he makes a bet with Müller that Potôň will win in the first round. If he wins he will get Müller's business property but if he loses the bet Müller will get his property. The campaign doesn't start well and Potôň fares weakly in the polls. This changes when Lambert's people find out that Potôň is related to Ľudovít Štúr and Lambert uses it in the campaign. Potôň gets a boost in polls but still isn't popular enough to win in the first round. Lambert decides to organise a false flag attentat on Potôň to increase his popularity enough. A day before voting the attentat occurs but Potôň is, in a shocking twist, shot by real bullets. He is taken to the hospital where he dies but not before the result of the election is announced; he wins in a landslide victory. Lambert wins the bet and gains Müller's property. Blonďáčik and Jazva give the compromising materials to Lambert's estranged wife who was secretly pulling all the strings. Blonďáčik states that she will destroy Lambert one day, if he doesn't destroy himself first. Blonďáčik later establishes new political party, the Party of Potôň's Successors, and becomes a major political force.

== Cast ==
- Marek Majeský – Adam Lambert
- Monika Hilmerová – Alena
- Michal Kubovčík – Blonďáčik
- Ján Jackuliak – Ivan Müller
- Michal Dlouhý – Jazva
- Roman Luknár – Bachratý
- Pavel Nový – generál
- Pavel Slabý – bishop Jozef

Czech president Miloš Zeman appeared in a cameo role as a president of the Czech Republic. He wasn't elected yet when he was shooting his scene.

== Shooting ==
The shooting started on 19 September 2012. The shooting took place primarily in Slovakia but some parts were shot in the Czech Republic. Filming was complicated by the weather. Some scenes were shot authentically by asking various people about elections. It includes random people but also celebrities.
