= Autumn Spring =

2001 film by Vladimír Michálek

- Directed by: Vladimír Michálek
- Starring: Vlastimil Brodský; Stella Zázvorková
- Cinematography: Martin Štrba
- Edited by: Jiří Brožek
- Music by: Michał Lorenc
- Release date: 27 September 2001
- Running time: 100 minutes
- Country: Czech Republic
- Language: Czech

Autumn Spring (Czech: Babí léto) is a 2001 Czech drama film directed by Vladimír Michálek.

== Cast ==
- Vlastimil Brodský - František Hána („Fanda“)
- Stella Zázvorková - Emílie Hánová
- Stanislav Zindulka - Eduard Stará („Eda“)
- Ondřej Vetchý - Jaroslav Hána („Jára“)
- Zita Kabátová - Maruška Grulichová
- Petra Špalková - Králová
- Jiří Lábus - Estate agent
