= Forgotten Light =

- Directed by: Vladimír Michálek
- Written by: Milena Jelínek
- Starring: Bolek Polívka
- Release date: 1996
- Running time: 105 minutes
- Country: Czech Republic
- Language: Czech

Forgotten Light (Czech: Zapomenuté světlo) is a 1996 Czech film directed by Vladimír Michálek. The screenplay by Czech-American Milena Jelinek is based on a 1934 book by Jakub Deml which is considered a masterpiece of Czech literature of the 20th century. The film was the Czech Republic's submission to the 70th Academy Awards for the Academy Award for Best Foreign Language Film, but was not accepted as a nominee.

The protagonist is Father Holý, a village priest, who battles the state and religious bureaucracies of 1980s Czechoslovakia to raise money for a new church roof. Permeated by his love for the villagers, his encounters are marked by his good humor. In his losing battle against Church and State, Holý is ordered transferred away from his parish and his allies.

== Cast ==
- Bolek Polívka as Vicar Holý
- Veronika Žilková as Marjánka
- Petr Kavan as Francek
- Jiří Pecha as Klíma
- Antonín Kinský as Count Kinský
- Jiří Lábus as Vicar Kubišta
- Richard Metznarowski as Chapter's Vicar

== See also ==
- Cinema of the Czech Republic
- List of submissions to the 70th Academy Awards for Best Foreign Language Film
- List of Czech submissions for the Academy Award for Best Foreign Language Film
