= Emília Došeková =

Slovak actress (1937–2021)

- Born: 14 June 1937; Bratislava, Czechoslovakia
- Died: 19 April 2021 (aged 83); Šaľa, Slovakia
- Education: Academy of Performing Arts in Bratislava
- Occupations: Actress, script writer, chanson singer
- Years active: 1958–2015
- Children: 2

Emília Došeková (14 June 1937 – 19 April 2021) was a Slovak actress, script writer and chanson singer.

== Biography ==
Emília Došeková was born on 14 June 1937 in Bratislava. She grew up in her mother hometown of Krupina and received education at the grammar school in Šahy. She studied at the Bratislava Conservatory and Academy of Performing Arts in Bratislava, graduating in 1958.

From 1958 to 1973 Došeková acted at the Nitra Region Theatre. In 1973 she became an independent artist, which allowed her to focus full time on chanson performances and writing television scripts.

Došeková appeared in over 20 movies. Her debut was the 1962 film Bíla Oblaka ("White Clouds"). Her last film was 2010 comedy Surviving Life. Her other notable role was in 2002 comedy Kruté radosti ("Cruel Joys"). In the 2010, she appeared only in small episodic roles of TV Series Ochrancovia ("Protectors"; 2014) and Tajné životy ("Secret lives"; 2015).

In 2002, the Radio and Television of Slovakia funded and broadcast a documentary about the life of Emília Došeková titled Háčkovaný svet (Crochet World) directed by Fedor Bartko.

Emília Došeková died on 19 April 2021 in Šaľa at the age of 83.

Emília Došeková had two sons.
