= Bohdan Sláma =

Czech film director (born 1967)

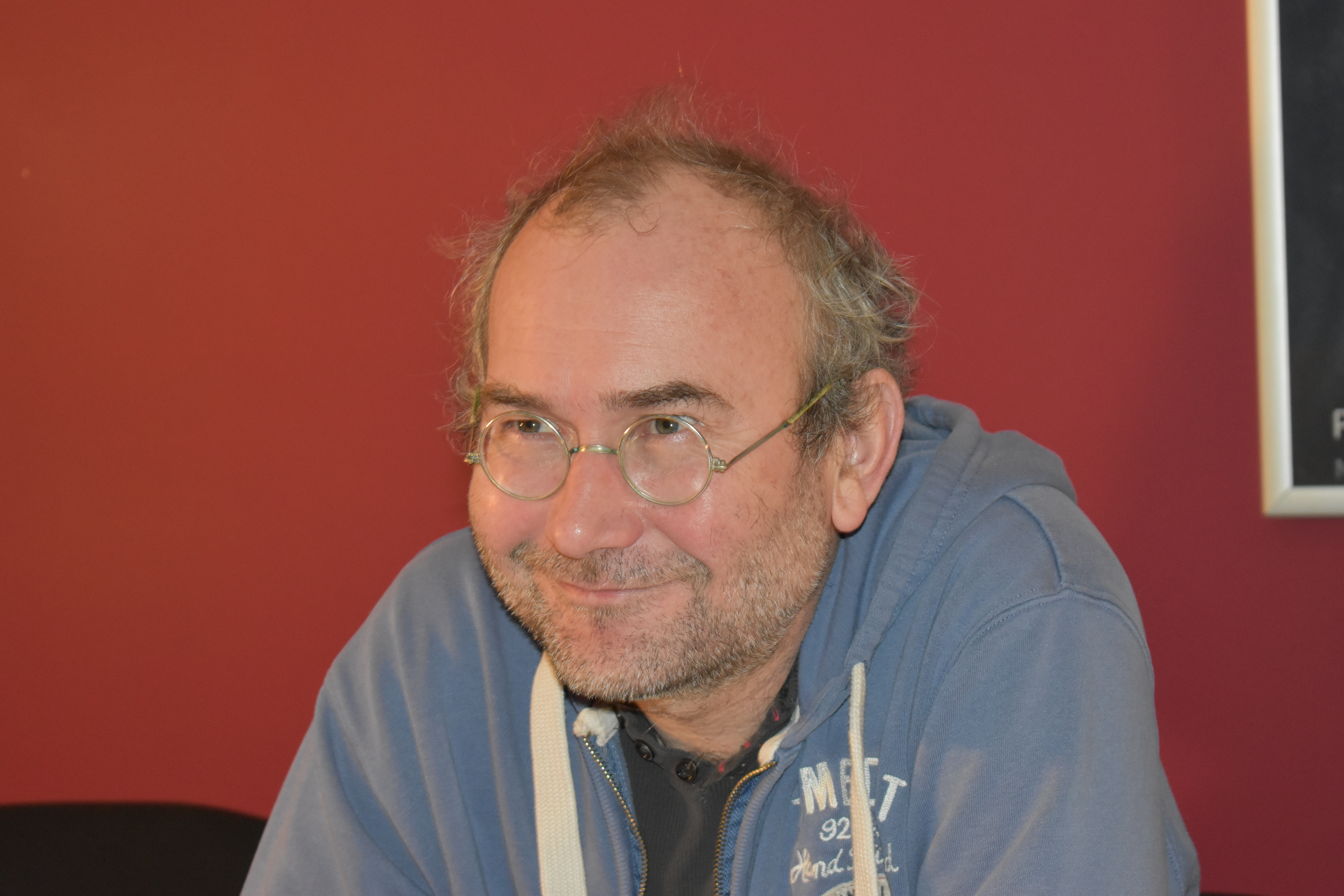
Bohdan Sláma (2017)

Bohdan Sláma (born 29 May 1967 in Opava) is a Czech film director. He studied at the Film and Television Faculty of the Academy of Performing Arts in Prague (FAMU).

== Filmography ==
| Year | Czech title | English title | Notes |
|---|---|---|---|
| 1990 | Mrtvý les | | actor; film short |
| 1992 | Štvanice | | director; writer; film short |
| 1995 | Akáty bílé | | director; writer |
| 2001 | Divoké včely | Wild Bees | director; writer; VPRO Tiger Award at the International Film Festival Rotterdam and the SKYY Award at San Francisco |
| 2002 | Radhošť – "Zahrádka ráje" | | director; writer |
| 2003 | Čert ví proč | The Devil Knows Why | actor |
| 2005 | Štěstí | Something Like Happiness | director; writer; Golden Shell at San Sebastian International Film Festival |
| 2008 | Venkovský učitel | The Country Teacher | director; writer |
| 2012 | Čtyři slunce | Four Suns | director; writer |
| 2017 | Bába z Ledu | Ice Mother | director; writer |
