= Television Studio Ostrava =

Coordinates: 49°50′16″N 18°17′27″E

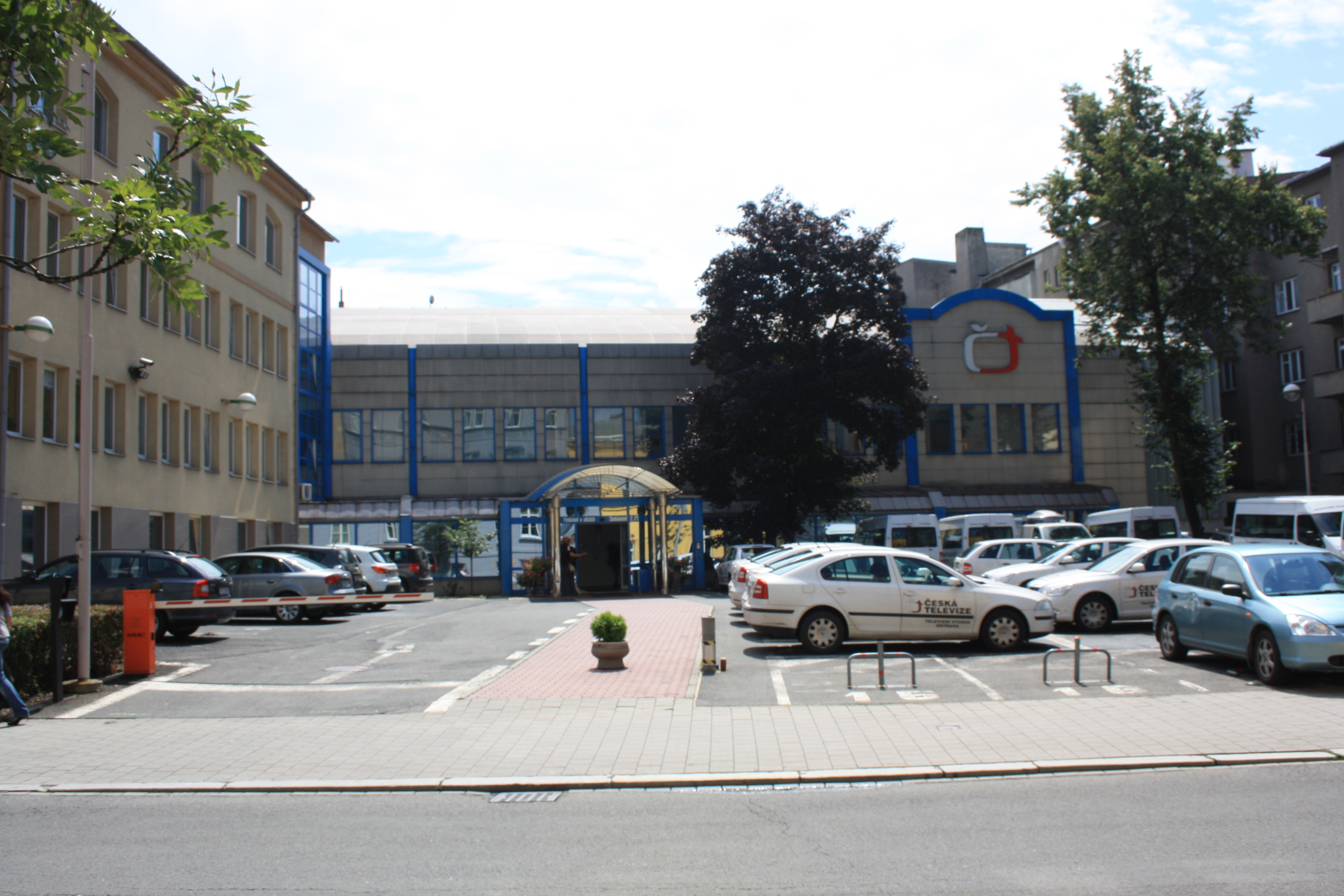
Residence in Ostrava

Television Studio Ostrava is a regional studio of Czech Television in Ostrava established by law. It was established in the fall of 1955 as the first non-Prague television studio of the then Czechoslovak Radio and began broadcasting on December 31 of the same year with a New Year's program. It is based in the center of Moravská Ostrava and had 249 employees at the end of 2020. The newsroom of the Ostrava Television Studio also includes the newsrooms in Olomouc and Krnov and their staff.

The studio does not have legal personality. However, its director is authorized by law to perform legal acts related to the studio, including the conclusion of contracts, on behalf of Czech Television, with the exception of dealing with real estate. The director is elected and recalled by the Council of Czech Television on the proposal of the director general of the entire institution. Miroslav Karas has been the director of the Ostrava Television Studio since 2020.
