= Ice Mother =

2017 film

- Film poster
- Directed by: Bohdan Sláma
- Written by: Bohdan Sláma
- Produced by: Petr Oukropec; Pavel Strnad
- Starring: Zuzana Kronerová; Pavel Nový
- Release date: 23 February 2017
- Running time: 106 minutes
- Country: Czech Republic
- Language: Czech
- Box office: $337,591

Ice Mother (Czech: Bába z ledu) is a 2017 Czech drama film directed by Bohdan Sláma. It was selected as the Czech entry for the Best Foreign Language Film at the 90th Academy Awards, but it was not nominated.

== Plot ==
Hana, a happy 67-year-old mother and grandmother, experiences a series of life-changing events.

== Cast ==
- Zuzana Kronerová as Hana
- Pavel Nový as Broňa
- Václav Neužil as Ivan
- Tatiana Vilhelmová as Kateřina
- Petra Špalková as Věra
- Marek Daniel as Petr
- Alena Mihulová as Zuzana
- Marie Ludvíková as Květa
- Božena Černá as Boženka
- Josef Ježek as Bohouš

== See also ==
- List of submissions to the 90th Academy Awards for Best Foreign Language Film
- List of Czech submissions for the Academy Award for Best Foreign Language Film
