= Spring of Life (2000 film) =

- Original title: Der Lebensborn: Pramen života
- Directed by: Milan Cieslar
- Written by: Vladimír Körner (novel)
- Screenplay by: Milan Cieslar
- Starring: Monika Hilmerová
- Release date: 2000
- Running time: 107 minutes
- Country: Czech Republic
- Language: Czech

Spring of Life (Czech: Pramen života) is a 2000 Czech film directed by Milan Cieslar.

== Plot ==
The film depicts the Lebensborn programme established by the Nazis before the outbreak of World War II. The programme was intended to promote the birth of children deemed “racially valuable” according to Nazi racial ideology, including through support for selected unmarried mothers. Nazi authorities also abducted children from occupied territories who were considered to meet “Aryan” criteria and placed many of them with German families.

In the film, Grétka Weisser (Monika Hilmerová), a young woman from the Sudetenland, is sent to a facility under the pretence of undergoing tuberculosis screening, only to discover that she has instead been selected for the Lebensborn. Chosen because she physically conforms to Nazi racial ideals, she is housed in an institution alongside other women participating in the programme. She falls in love with a Jew, Leo (Michał Sieczkowski), who has been hiding there.

== Reviews ==
Some commentators questioned the historical accuracy of the film's depiction of life within a Lebensborn facility, particularly the portrayal of a Jewish man living in hiding there with the apparent knowledge of several residents such as the head doctor, as well as the relative freedom of movement afforded to Grétka despite her frequently breaking the Lebenborn's rules.

The film is currently rated 6.5 on IMDb.

== Cast ==
- Monika Hilmerová : Grétka
- Michał Sieczkowski: Leo
- Johana Tesarová : Klára
- Vilma Cibulková : Waage
- Karel Dobrý : Odillo
- Bronislav Poloczek : Kasuba
- Josef Somr : Teacher
