= Jana Oľhová =

Slovak actress

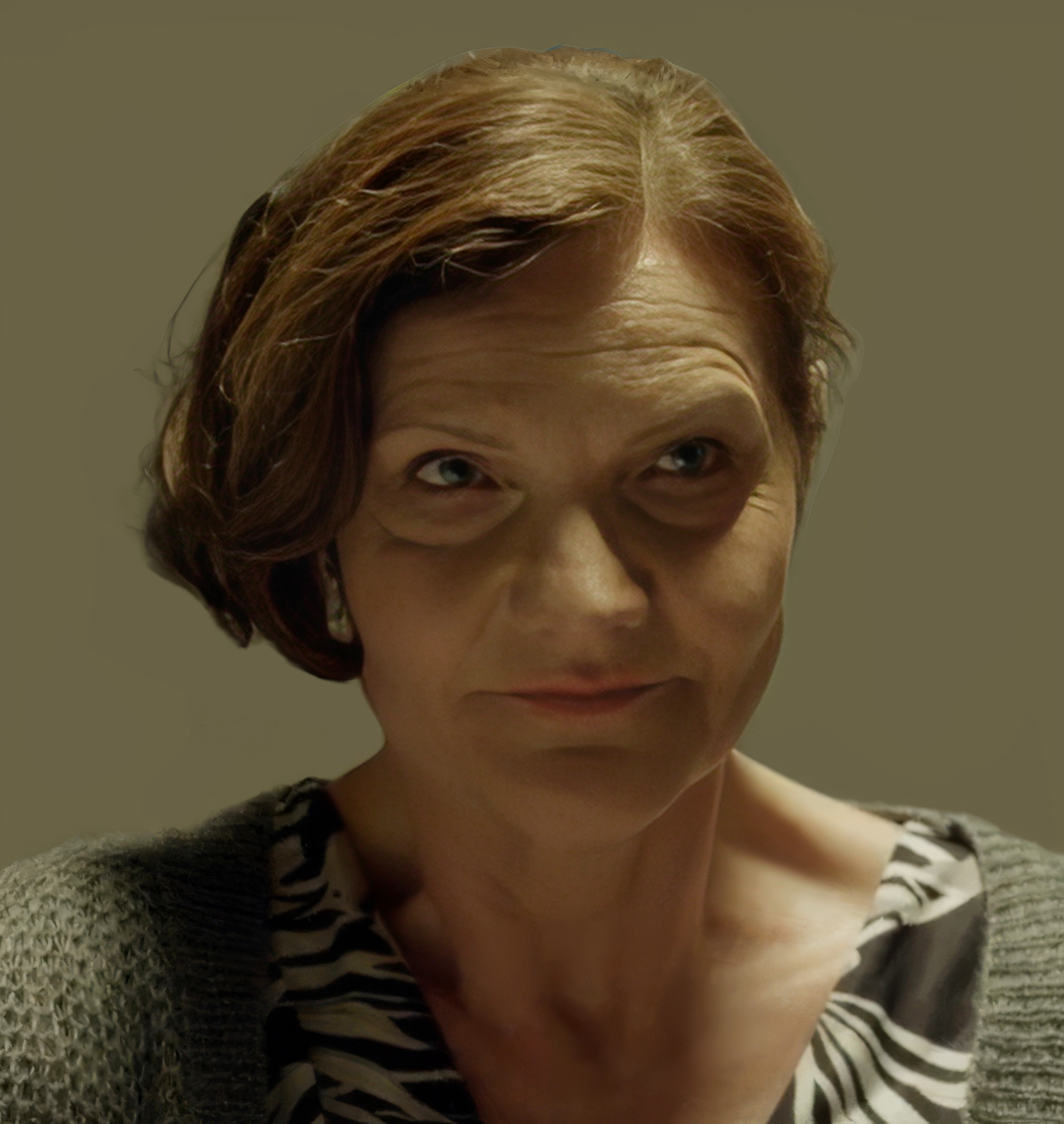
- Oľhová in 2019
- Born: 31 December 1959 (age 66); Myjava, Czechoslovakia
- Occupation: Actress
- Years active: 1980–present

Jana Oľhová (born 31 December 1959) is a Slovak actress. At the 2008 Sun in a Net Awards she won the category of Best Supporting Actress for her performance in the film Music. Oľhová won another accolade at the Sun in a Net Awards, again for Best Supporting Actress, in 2014 for her performance in the 2013 film Fine, Thanks (Ďakujem, dobře).

== Selected filmography ==
- The Millennial Bee (1983)
- Želary (2003)
- Bathory (2008)
- Music (2008)
- Odsúdené (television, 2010)
- Surviving Life (2010)
- The House (2011)
- Fine, Thanks (2013)
- Búrlivé víno (television, 2013–2017)
- The Seven Ravens (2015)
- Little Crusader (2017)
- Buko (2022)
