= Tomáš Maštalír =

Slovak actor (born 1977)

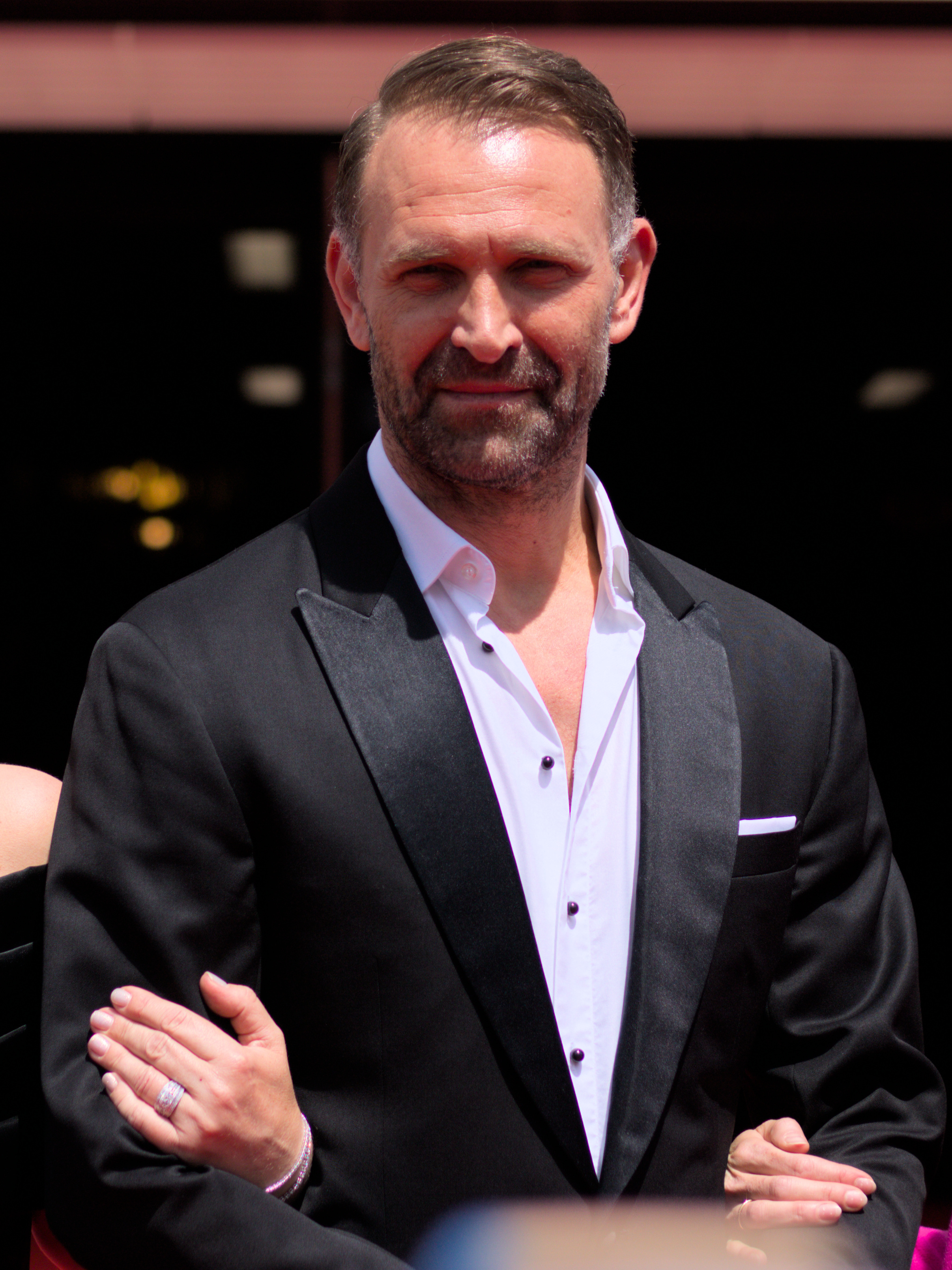
- Maštalír in 2024
- Born: 4 September 1977 (age 49); Trnava, Czechoslovakia
- Spouse: Kristína Maštalírová
- Partner(s): Diana Mórová; Táňa Pauhofová
- Children: 2

Tomáš Maštalír (born 4 September 1977) is a Slovak actor.

== Biography ==
Tomáš Maštalír was born on 4 September 1977 in Trnava. His father was a car mechanic, his mother a kindergarten teacher. He was educated as the grammar school in Modra, where he became involved with amateur theatre. Until his university studies, Maštalír was also active as a handball player.

Maštalír studied theatre acting at the Academy of Performing Arts in Bratislava, graduating in 2000. Following graduation, he became a member of the Slovak National Theatre, where he is still active as of 2024.

In addition to theatre acting, Maštalír has starred in television series, including Za sklom (2016), Chlap (2022), Vedlejší produkt (2024). He also appeared in the joint Czech and Slovak adaptation of the show Call My Agent! He is also active as a film actor, notably appearing in the movies The Line (2017), Bet on Friendship (2021) and Waves (2024).

== Accolades ==
Maštalír won the OTO Award for TV Male Actor three times - in 2007, 2008 and 2019. In 2017 he was awarded the Crystal Wing Award in the theatre category. In 2018 he was awarded the Sun in a Net Award for the best actor.

== Personal life ==
As an acting student, Maštalír was in romantic relationship with the actress Diana Mórová, who is 8 years his senior. From 2003 to 2011 he was in a relationship with the actress Táňa Pauhofová.

Maštalír married his partner, the civil servant Kristína, in 2018. The marriage took place without the presence of the media in Italy in 2018. They have two children.
