= Czech Lion Award for Best Design =

Czech film award

- Country: Czech Republic
- First award: 1993–2013
- Website: https://www.filmovaakademie.cz

Czech Lion Award for Best Design was an award given to the best design in Czech film.

== Winners ==
Year	English Name	Original Name	Person
1993	Horror Story	Krvavý román	Jaroslav Brabec
1994	Faust	Lekce Faust	Jan Švankmajer, Eva Švankmajerová
1995	The Garden	Záhrada	František Lipták
1996	King Ubu	Král Ubu	Jindřich Goetz
1997	The Path through a Desolate Forest	Cesta pustým lesem	Vladimír Labský
1998	Sekal Has to Die	Je třeba zabít Sekala	Jiří Sternwald
1999	The Melancholic Chicken	Kuře melancholik	Karel Vacek, Václav Vohlídal, Milan Čorba
2000	Andel Exit	Anděl Exit	Martin Štrba, Vladimír Michálek
2001	Little Otik	Otesánek	Jan Švankmajer, Eva Švankmajerová
2002	Fimfarum	Fimfárum Jana Wericha	Martin Velíšek, Petr Poš
2003	Smart Philip	Mazaný Filip	Jan Vlasák
2004	Vaterland - A Hunting Logbook	Vaterland - lovecký deník	Milan Popelka
2005	Lunacy	Šílení	Eva Švankmajerová, Veronika Hrubá
2006	Fimfarum 2	Fimfárum 2	Pavel Koutský, Petr Poš, Martin Velíšek, Jan Balej
2007	One Night in One City	Jedné noci v jednom městě	Jan Balej
2008	Bathory	Bathory	Juraj Jakubisko, Jarka Pecharová
2009	Toys in the Attic	Na půdě aneb Kdo má dneska narozeniny?	Jiří Barta
2010	Surviving Life	Přežít svůj život	Jan Švankmajer
2011	Alois Nebel	Alois Nebel	Jaromír 99, Henrich Boraros, Noro Držiak
2012	In the Shadow	Ve stínu	Jan Vlasák, Jarmila Konečná, Lukáš Král
