= Little Crusader =

2017 Czech historical drama film

- Film poster
- Directed by: Václav Kadrnka
- Written by: Václav Kadrnka; Vojtech Masek; Jirí Soukup
- Based on: Svojanovský křižáček by Jaroslav Vrchlický
- Produced by: Václav Kadrnka
- Starring: Karel Roden
- Cinematography: Jan Baset Stritezsky
- Edited by: Pavel Kolaja
- Music by: Vojtech Havel; Irena Havlová
- Production companies: Sirius Films; Artileria
- Release date: 7 July 2017 (KVIFF)
- Running time: 90 minutes
- Country: Czech Republic
- Language: Czech
- Budget: €1,300,000

Little Crusader (Czech: Křižáček) is a 2017 Czech historical drama film directed by Václav Kadrnka. It won a Crystal Globe at the Karlovy Vary International Film Festival.

The film, shot in Italy, tells the story of the knight Bořek, who is travelling to find his lost son. It is based on the poem Svojanovský křižáček by Jaroslav Vrchlický.

The filming style is reminiscent of movies directed by František Vláčil.

== Cast and characters ==
- Karel Roden as Bořek
- Aleš Bílík as Szimko
- Jana Semerádová as Mother
- Matouš John as Jeník
- Jiří Soukup as a Hermit
- Michal Legíň as Uhlíř
- Šimon Vyskočil as Uhlíř's son
- Jana Oľhová as the innkeeper's wife
- Ivan Krúpa as the innkeeper
- Eliška Křenková as Angel
- Jan Bednář as Štěpán
- Tomáš Bambušek as an actor

== Synopsis ==
Bořek's little son Jeník hears a tale from a priest about the Children's Crusade, which influences him to run away from home. His father, who is a knight, goes on a desperate journey to find him.

== Production ==
The film is a loose adaptation of the poem "Svojanovský křižáček". Kadrnka came across the poem while working on a different project and decided to create an adaptation of it. Preparations started in 2011 and shooting began in December 2015. The film was shot mostly in Italy, concluding in early 2016.

== Reception ==
The film received mixed reactions from critics and audiences, many of whom debated whether it really deserved the Crystal Globe.

=== Accolades ===
Date of ceremony	Event	Award	Recipient(s)	Result	Ref(s)
2017	52nd Karlovy Vary International Film Festival	Crystal Globe for Best Film	Václav Kadrnka	Won	
