= Stanislava Jachnická =

Czech actress

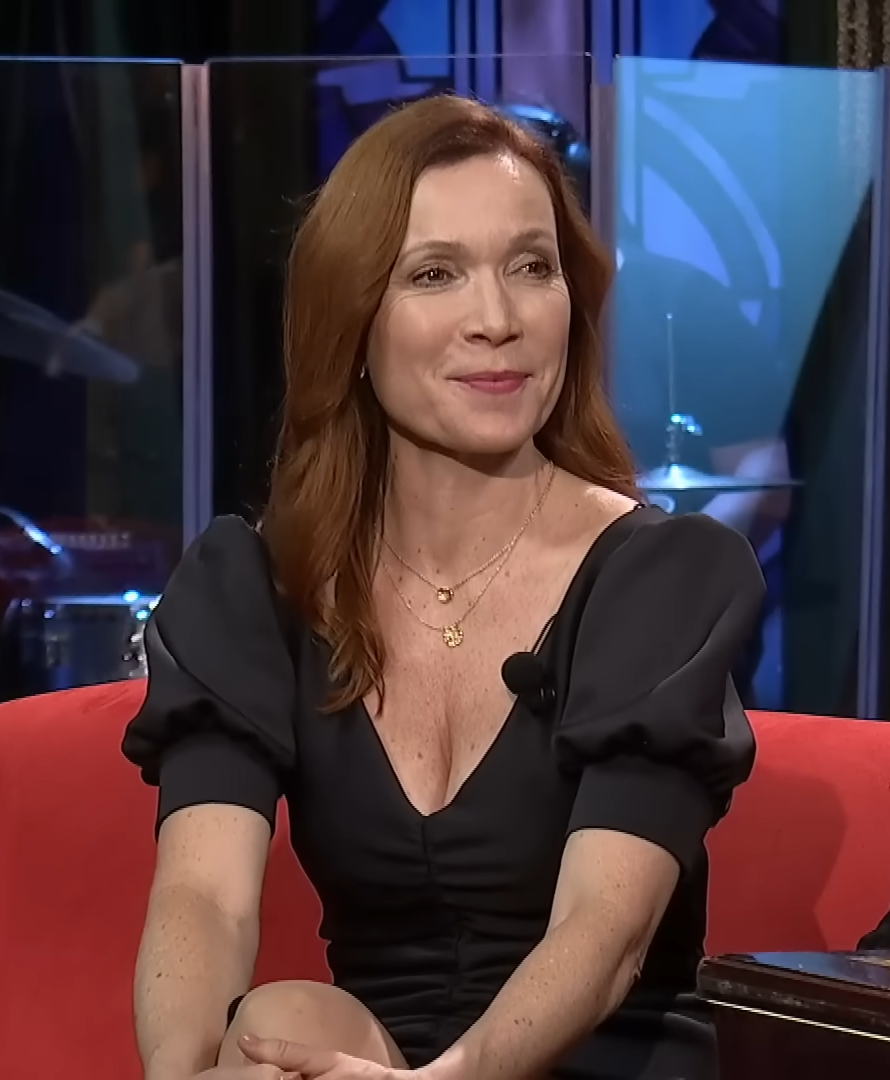
- Born: Stanislava Šťastná; 18 August 1965 (age 60); Prague, Czechoslovakia
- Occupation: Actress
- Spouse: Petr Jachnický
- Children: 2

Stanislava Jachnická is a Czech stage and television actress. She provided the Czech voice of Lisa Kudrow.

== Biography ==
She was born on 8 August 1965 in Prague, Czechoslovakia. She studied at the Secondary School of Economics and Theatrical Academy of Musical Arts.

== Theatre ==
=== ABC Theatre ===
- Our Town .... Mrs. Webb
- Everything in the Garden ... Cynthia
- Anna Karenina .... Dolly Oblonskaya
- Lorna and Ted .... Lorna

=== Rokoko Theatre ===
- Passion .... Agnes

== Filmography ==
- "Soukromé pasti" (2008) TV series .... (episode ???)
- PF 77 (2003)
- Postel (1997)
- Smůla (1997)
- Fany (1995)
- Dotyky (1988)

== Voice works in the films and TV shows ==
- Bandslam (2010) .... Karen Burton
- Hotel for Dogs (2009) .... Lois Scudder
- Happy Endings (2005) .... Mamie
- Analyze That (2003) .... Laura McNamara Sobel
- Analyze This (2000) .... Laura McNamara Sobel
- Hanging Up (2000) .... Maddy Mozell
- CSI: NY (2006-2010) .... Stella Bonasera
- Cobra 11 (1998-????) .... Andrea Schäfer
- Friends (1996-2004) .... Phoebe Buffay Hannigan

== Personal life ==
She is married with a son and a daughter.
