= Pavel Nový =

Czech actor

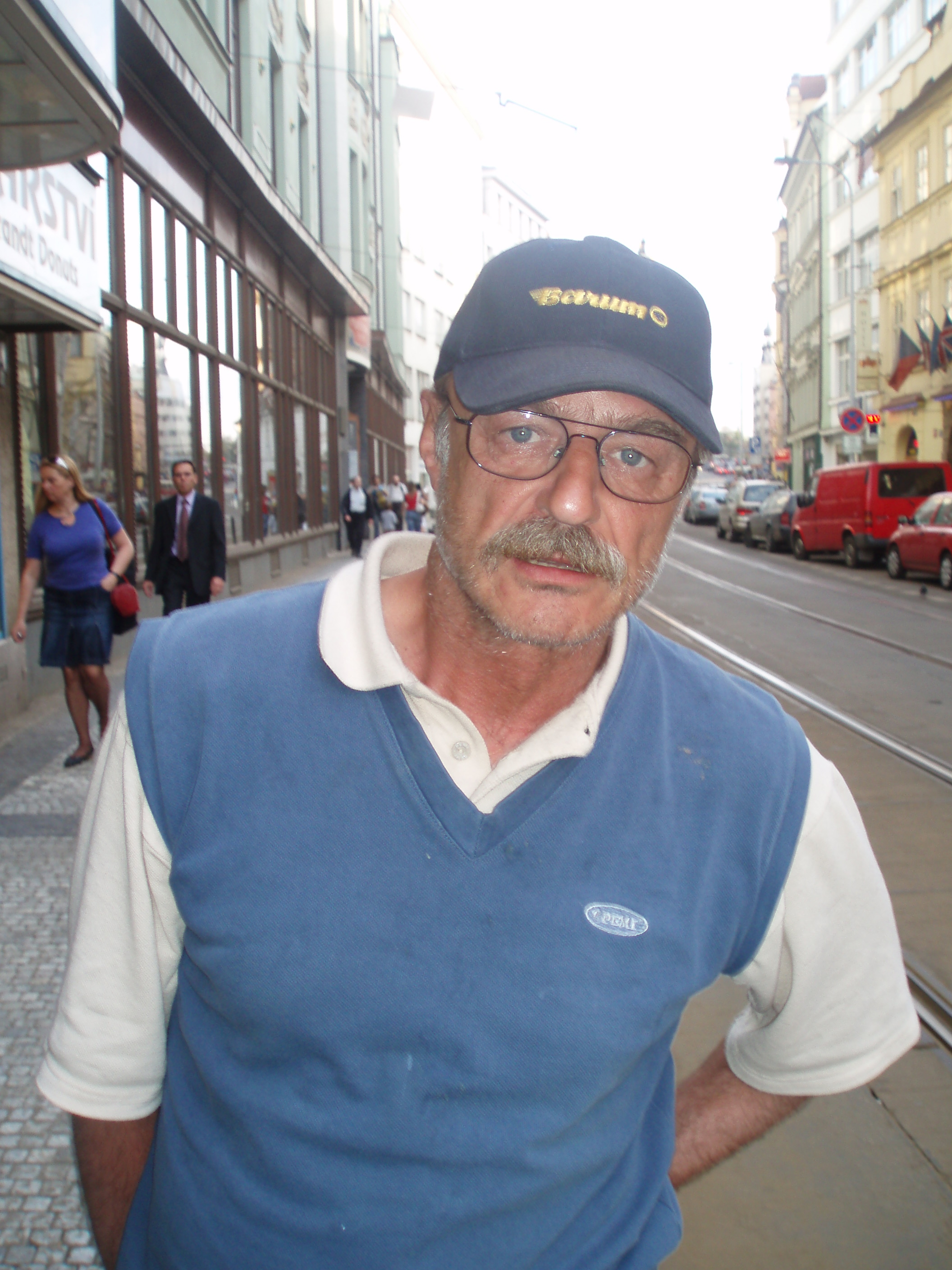
- Born: 5 September 1948 (age 77); Plzeň, Czechoslovakia
- Occupation: Actor
- Years active: 1962–present

Pavel Nový (born 5 September 1948) is a Czech actor. He has appeared in more than one hundred films since 1962.

== Selected filmography ==
Year	Title	Role	Notes
1982	I Enjoy the World with You		
1996	Conspirators of Pleasure		
2000	Little Otik	Alžbětka's Father	
2005	Lunacy	Servant Dominik	
2006	Rafťáci		
2006	I Served the King of England		
2010	Surviving Life		
2013	Candidate		
2016	Ice Mother	Broňa	
2020	Shadow Country		
