= Little Otik =

Otesánek
- Czechoslovak theatrical release poster
- Directed by: Jan Švankmajer
- Written by: Jan Švankmajer
- Produced by: Keith Griffiths; Jaromir Kallista; Jan Švankmajer
- Starring: Veronika Žilková; Jan Hartl; Kristina Adamcová
- Cinematography: Juraj Galvánek
- Edited by: Marie Zemanova
- Music by: Ivo Spalj (sounds); Carl Maria von Weber (musical score)
- Production companies: Athanor; Barrandov Biografia; FilmFour; Illumination Films
- Distributed by: Warner Bros. Pictures (Czech Republic); FilmFour Distributors (United Kingdom)
- Release dates: 7 September 2000 (VFF); 25 January 2001 (Czech Republic); 26 October 2001 (United Kingdom)
- Running time: 132 minutes
- Countries: Czech Republic; United Kingdom
- Language: Czech

Little Otik (Czech: Otesánek), also known as Greedy Guts, is a 2000 surreal dark comedy horror film by Jan Švankmajer and Eva Švankmajerová. Based on the folktale Otesánek by Karel Jaromír Erben, the film is a comedic live action, stop motion-animated feature film set mainly in an apartment building in the Czech Republic.

The film uses the Overture to Der Freischütz (1821) by Carl Maria von Weber as the score.

== Plot ==
Karel Horák (Jan Hartl) and Božena Horáková (Veronika Žilková) are a childless couple and for medical reasons are doomed to remain so. While on vacation at a house in the country with their neighbors, the Stadlers, Karel decides to buy the house at the suggestion of Mr. Stadler. When he is fixing up the house, he digs up a tree stump that looks vaguely like a baby. He spends the rest of the evening cleaning it up and then presents it to his wife. She names the stump Otík and starts to treat it like a real baby. She then works out a plan to fake her pregnancy, and becoming more and more impatient, she speeds up the process and 'gives birth' one month early.

Otík comes alive and has an insatiable appetite. Alžbětka (Kristina Adamcová), the Stadlers’ daughter, has been suspicious all along, and when she reads the fairy tale about Otesánek, the truth becomes clear to her. Meanwhile, little Otík has been just eating and growing. One day, he eats some of Božena's hair. On another, Božena returns home to find that Otík has eaten their cat. Karel and his wife are then at odds: Karel pushes for killing the creature, while Božena defends it as their child. The baby later consumes a postal worker (Gustav Vondráček) and then a social worker (Jitka Smutná).

The resulting deaths lead Karel to tie up and lock Otík away in the basement of their apartment building, leaving Otík to starve. Alžbětka then secretly takes over as prime caretaker. She tries to keep Otík fed with normal human food, but, when her mother stops her, she is forced to drawing straws (matches in this case) to choose a person to feed to Otík. The chosen victim is an old man and pedophile, Mr. Žlábek (Zdeněk Kozák), who has been stalking her recently. Deciding she cannot take the stalking anymore, Alžbětka lures Mr. Žlábek to the basement, where he gets entangled by Otik's vines and devoured. Karel himself later becomes a victim when he comes into the basement with a chainsaw, but on seeing Otík, he hesitates and calls him "son" before dropping the chainsaw. Afterwards, Božena goes into the basement and is heard screaming, having become a victim herself. In the end, Otík disobeys Alžbětka despite repeated warnings and eats all of Mrs. Správcová's (Dagmar Stříbrná) cabbage patch, prompting the old woman to take charge.

=== Ending ===
In the fairy tale upon which the movie is based, the old woman kills Otesánek by splitting his stomach open with a hoe; however, the film ends with her descending the stairs, Alžbětka reciting the end of the fairy tale tearfully; the audience is not allowed to witness the deed.

== Cast ==
- Veronika Žilková as Božena Horáková
- Jan Hartl as Karel Horák
- Kristina Adamcová as Alžbětka
- Jaroslava Kretschmerová as Alžbětka's Mother
- Pavel Nový as Alžbětka's Father
- Dagmar Stríbrná as Pani spravcova (the caretaker)
- Zdenek Kozák as Mr. Žlábek
- Gustav Vondracek as Mládek, the Postman
- Jitka Smutná as Bulanková, the Social worker

== Reception ==
On Rotten Tomatoes, the film holds an approval rating of 84% based on 44 reviews, with a weighted average rating of 7/10. The site's critical consensus reads, "Though rather overlong, Little Otik is a whimsical, bizarre treat."

The film won three awards at the 2001 Czech Lion Awards for Best Design, Best Film Poster, and Best Film.

Little Otik was placed at 95 on Slant Magazine's best films of the 2000s.
