= Otesánek =

19th C. Czech fairy tale

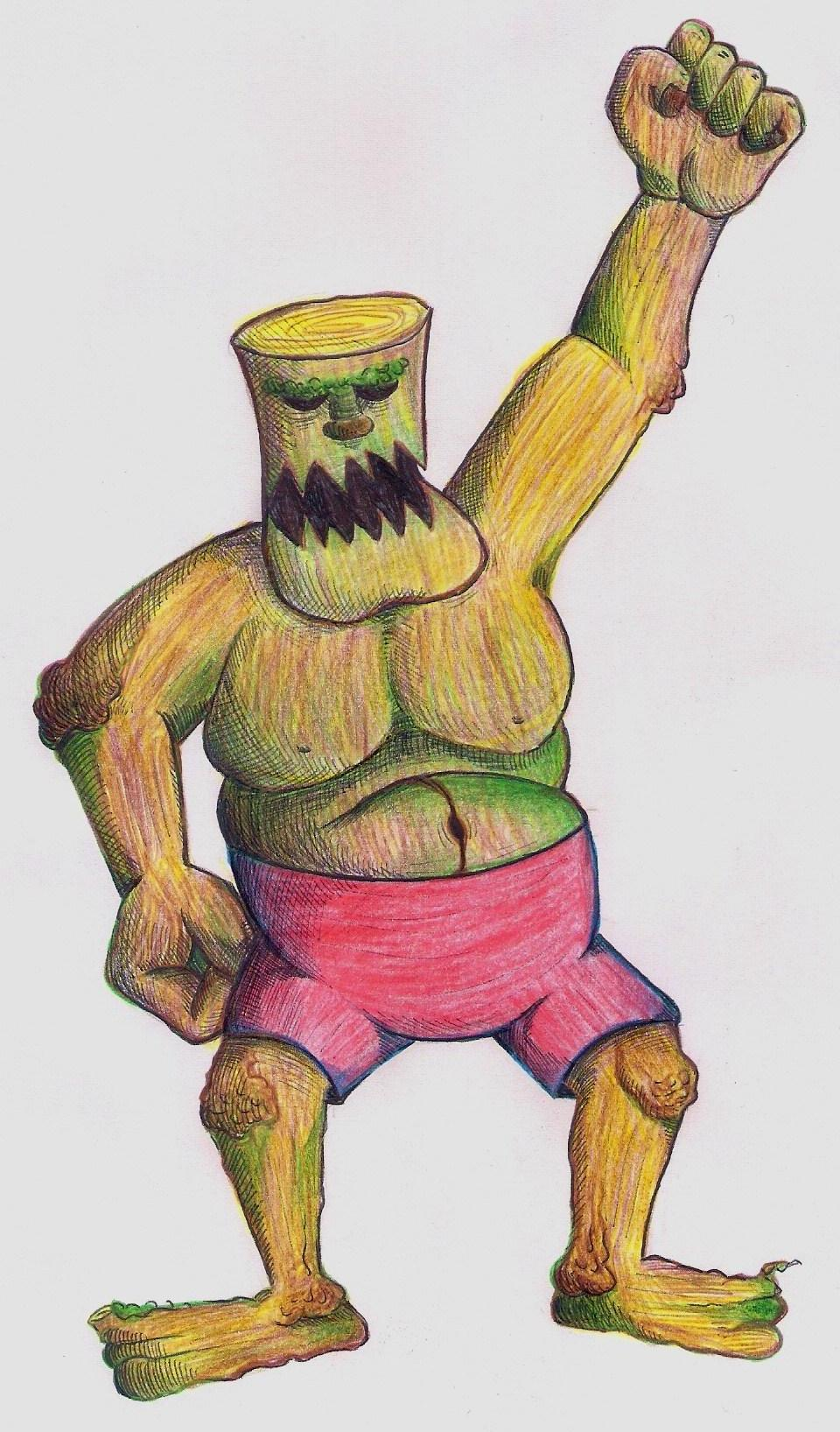
- Created by: Karel Jaromír Erben

Otesánek is a Czech fairy tale created by Karel Jaromír Erben in the 19th century which tells the story of a fearsome and constantly hungry, living log of wood. In the story there are elements of narrative that are similar to more famous fairy tales such as The Adventures of Pinocchio and Little Red Riding Hood; despite this, the themes present in Otesánek appear nonetheless to be quite different from most other European fairy tales, with a particularly ambiguous moral which leaves a lot of room to subjective interpretation.

== Plot ==
The story begins with a couple that for a long time has been waiting for a child, which, however, does not seem to arrive. One day the husband finds in the nearby forest a log of wood (Otesánek) that strangely resembles a baby and decides to bring it home. To the joy of the couple, the wooden baby comes to life and asks to be fed. Initially the couple is enthusiastic that their wish of having a child has finally been granted; however, the situation soon takes a turn for the worse as they find themselves having to deal with the insatiable appetite of the baby, who keeps growing and eating until he will start eating people, including his parents. The log anticipates each meal with a nursery rhyme in which he lists every previous meal he has eaten. The story eventually concludes with the death of Otesánek at the hands of an elderly lady of the village who rips open his chest with a hoe, thus killing the monster and freeing all those he ate, including his parents.

== Variants ==
There is a variant from India called the cat and the parrot in which a cat eats a parrot when he comes to visit him for dinner, he then proceeds to eat an old woman, an old man, a king, a queen, a battalion of soldiers, a parade of elephants and a crab. The crab cuts open the cat's stomach.

There is a version from Hungary called the pork pudding. In this one a farmer kills a pig and makes a pork pudding. The next month the farmer sends his eldest daughter up to the cellar to get the pork pudding. The pork pudding eats her. The second and third daughter come and are eaten too. The farmer's wife goes up next and is eaten. The farmer then comes up and gets eaten by the pork pudding. The pork pudding then breaks out of the cellar and starts eating everyone in the village. The pork pudding eats a shepherd boy who cuts him open with a dagger saving everyone.

A similar Russian tale is called "The Clay-Boy" ("Гли́няный па́рень", Glínyanyĭ párenʹ). In it, an old childless couple make themselves a clay-child, who first eats all their food, then them, then a number of people, until he meets a goat who offers to jump right into his mouth, but instead uses the opportunity to ram the Clay-Boy, shattering him and freeing everyone.

== In popular culture ==
The film Little Otik, directed by Jan Švankmajer, was released in 2000 and is greatly inspired by this fairy tale.

In the seventh episode of the third season of Blown Away, a television glass blowing competition, glass blowers John Moran and John Sharvin created a sculpture of the baby "Little Otik", which they called Alive, and Well?.

In the game Kingdom Come Deliverance there is a reference to this tale in the form of a small scene: In a clearing, there is a tree stump with two branches resembling shoe leather boots, and three pieces of branches stuck into the trunk to form eyes and a nose. Below, bear claws depict a toothy mouth. An axe is embedded in the tree, and next to it lies a human skeleton.
