= The Wild Bees =

2001 film

- Film poster
- Directed by: Bohdan Sláma
- Written by: Bohdan Sláma
- Music by: Miroslav Simácek
- Release date: 2001
- Country: Czech Republic
- Language: Czech

The Wild Bees (Czech: Divoké včely) is a 2001 Czech film directed by Bohdan Sláma. It was the Czech Republic's submission to the 75th Academy Awards for the Academy Award for Best Foreign Language Film, but was not accepted as a nominee.

== Cast ==
- Zdeněk Raušer - Kája
- Tatiana Vilhelmová - Božka
- Marek Daniel - Petr
- Vanda Hybnerová - Jana
- Pavel Liška - Laďa
- Miloš Černoušek - Tata
- Eva Tauchenová - Babi
- Zuzana Kronerová - Lisajová

== See also ==
- Cinema of the Czech Republic
- List of Czech submissions for Academy Award for Best Foreign Language Film
