= Václav Kadrnka =

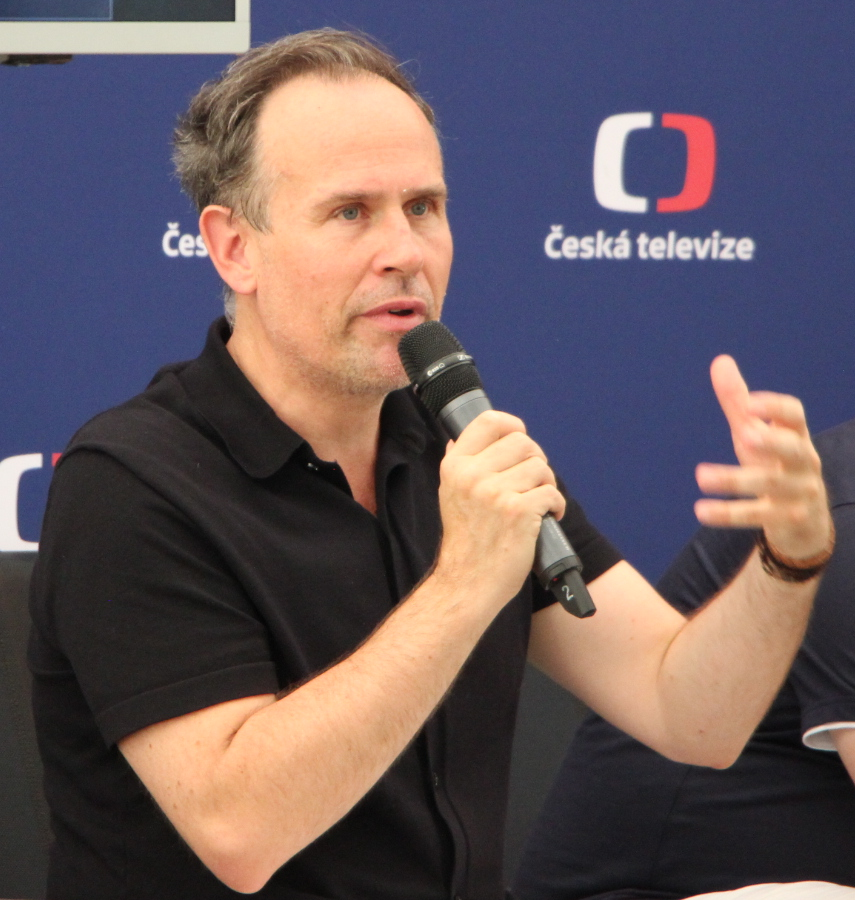
- Kadrnka at the 50th Summer Film School in Uherské Hradiště, 2024
- Born: 10 September 1973 (age 52); Gottwaldov, Czechoslovakia
- Occupations: Screenwriter, film director

Václav Kadrnka is a Czech screenwriter and film director.

== Early life and career ==
Kadrnka was born on 10 September 1973 in Gottwaldov, Czechoslovakia (today Zlín, Czech Republic). In 1981, he moved with his family to the United Kingdom, where he studied theatre. In 2010, he made his debut with the film Eighty Letters, which was premiered at the 61st Berlin International Film Festival and received major awards.

In 2017, his film Little Crusader, won Grand Prix for best film Crystal Globe at the Karlovy Vary International Film Festival and Czech Film Critics' Award for Best Director.

In 2021, Kadrnka received IFFI Best Director Award for his drama film, Saving One Who Was Dead.

== Selected filmography ==
- 2021: Saving One Who Was Dead
- 2017: Little Crusader
- 2010: Eighty Letters
