= 2009 Czech Lion Awards =

Czech film award ceremony

17th Czech Lion Awards
- Date: March 6, 2010
- Site: Rudolfinum, Prague
- Hosted by: Bolek Polívka

Highlights
- Best Picture: Protector
- Best Actor: Kryštof Hádek; 3 Seasons in Hell
- Best Actress: Jana Plodková; Protector
- Best Supporting Actor: Ladislav Chudík; Kawasaki's Rose
- Best Supporting Actress: Daniela Kolářová; Kawasaki's Rose
- Most awards: Protector (6)
- Most nominations: 3 Seasons in Hell (11); Protector (11)

Television coverage
- Network: Česká televize

2010 Czech Lion Awards ceremony was held on 5 March 2011.

== Winners and nominees ==
Best Film	Best Director
Protector – Milan Kuchynka, Pavel Strnad; 3 Seasons in Hell – Monika Kristl; Kawasaki's Rose – Rudolf Biermann, Tomáš Hoffman	Marek Najbrt – Protector; Tomáš Mašín – 3 Seasons in Hell; Jan Hřebejk – Kawasaki's Rose
Best Actor in a Leading Role	Best Actress in a Leading Role
Kryštof Hádek – 3 Seasons in Hell; Martin Huba – Kawasaki's Rose; Marek Daniel – Protector	Jana Plodková – Protector; Karolina Gruszka – 3 Seasons in Hell; Lenka Vlasáková – Kawasaki's Rose
Best Actor in a Supporting Role	Best Actress in a Supporting Role
Ladislav Chudík – Kawasaki's Rose; Martin Huba – 3 Seasons in Hell; Antonín Kratochvíl – Kawasaki's Rose	Daniela Kolářová – Kawasaki's Rose; Klára Melíšková – Protector; Tereza Voříšková – An Earthly Paradise for the Eyes
Best Screenplay	Best Documentary
Robert Geisler, Benjamin Tuček, Marek Najbrt – Protector; Tomáš Mašín – 3 Seasons in Hell; Petr Jarchovský – Kawasaki's Rose	Forgotten Transports to Poland – Lukáš Přibyl; Občan Havel přikuluje – Jan Novák, Adam Novák; Welcome to North Korea! – Linda Jablonská
Best Cinematography	Best Editing
Karl Oskarsson – 3 Seasons in Hell; Antonio Riestra – Normal; Miloslav Holman – Protector	Pavel Hrdlička – Protector; Petr Turyna – 3 Seasons in Hell; Vladimír Barák – Kawasaki's Rose
Music	Sound
Midi lidi – Protector; Filip Jelínek – (3 sezóny v pekle); Jan P. Muchow – (Normal)	Pavel Rejholec, Jakub Čech – 3 Seasons in Hell; Pavel Rejholec, Marek Hart – Normal; Marek Hart, Tomáš Zůbek – Protector
Design
Jiří Barta – Toys in the Attic; Martin Kurel – 3 Seasons in Hell; Ondřej Nekvasil – Protector

=== Non-statutory Awards ===
Most Popular Film	Unique Contribution to Czech Film
Protector	Jana Brejchová
Film Critics' Award for Best Film	Film Critics' Award Best Documentary
Protector	Forgotten Transports to Poland
Best Film Poster	Best Foreign Film
Aleš Najbrt - Protector	Slumdog Millionaire
Legally Downloaded Film	Kinobox.cz Award for the Best Film
Sněženky a machři po 25 letech	Protector
