= 2000 Czech Lion Awards =

Czech film award ceremony

8th Czech Lion Awards
- Date: March 3, 2001
- Site: Lucerna, Prague
- Hosted by: Jaroslav Dušek and Martin Zbrožek

Highlights
- Best Picture: Divided We Fall
- Best Actor: Bolek Polívka; Divided We Fall
- Best Actress: Anna Šišková; Divided We Fall
- Best Supporting Actor: Jiří Macháček; Loners
- Best Supporting Actress: Eva Holubová; Ene bene
- Most awards: Divided We Fall (5)
- Most nominations: Loners (6)

Television coverage
- Network: Česká televize

2000 Czech Lion Awards ceremony was held on 3 March 2001.

== Winners and nominees ==
| Best Film | Best Director |
|---|---|
| Divided We Fall | Jan Hřebejk — Divided We Fall |
| Best Actor in a Leading Role | Best Actress in a Leading Role |
| Bolek Polívka — Divided We Fall | Anna Šišková — Divided We Fall |
| Best Actor in a Supporting Role | Best Actress in a Supporting Role |
| Jiří Macháček — Loners | Eva Holubová — Ene bene |
| Best Screenplay | Best Editing |
| Divided We Fall — Petr Jarchovský | Andel Exit — Jiří Brožek |
| Design | Best Cinematography |
| Andel Exit — Martin Štrba, Vladimír Michálek | Wild Flowers — F. A. Brabec |
| Music | Sound |
| Wild Flowers — Jan Jirásek | Wild Flowers — Jiří Klenka |
Unique Contribution to Czech Film
Věra Chytilová

=== Non-statutory Awards ===
| Best Foreign Film | Most Popular Film |
|---|---|
| American Beauty | The Princess from the Mill 2 |
| Worst Film | Cinema Readers' Award |
| Beginning of World | Divided We Fall |
| Film Critics' Award | Best Film Poster |
| Divided We Fall | Juraj Jakubisko — Wild Flowers |
