= Petr Jarchovský =

Czech screenwriter

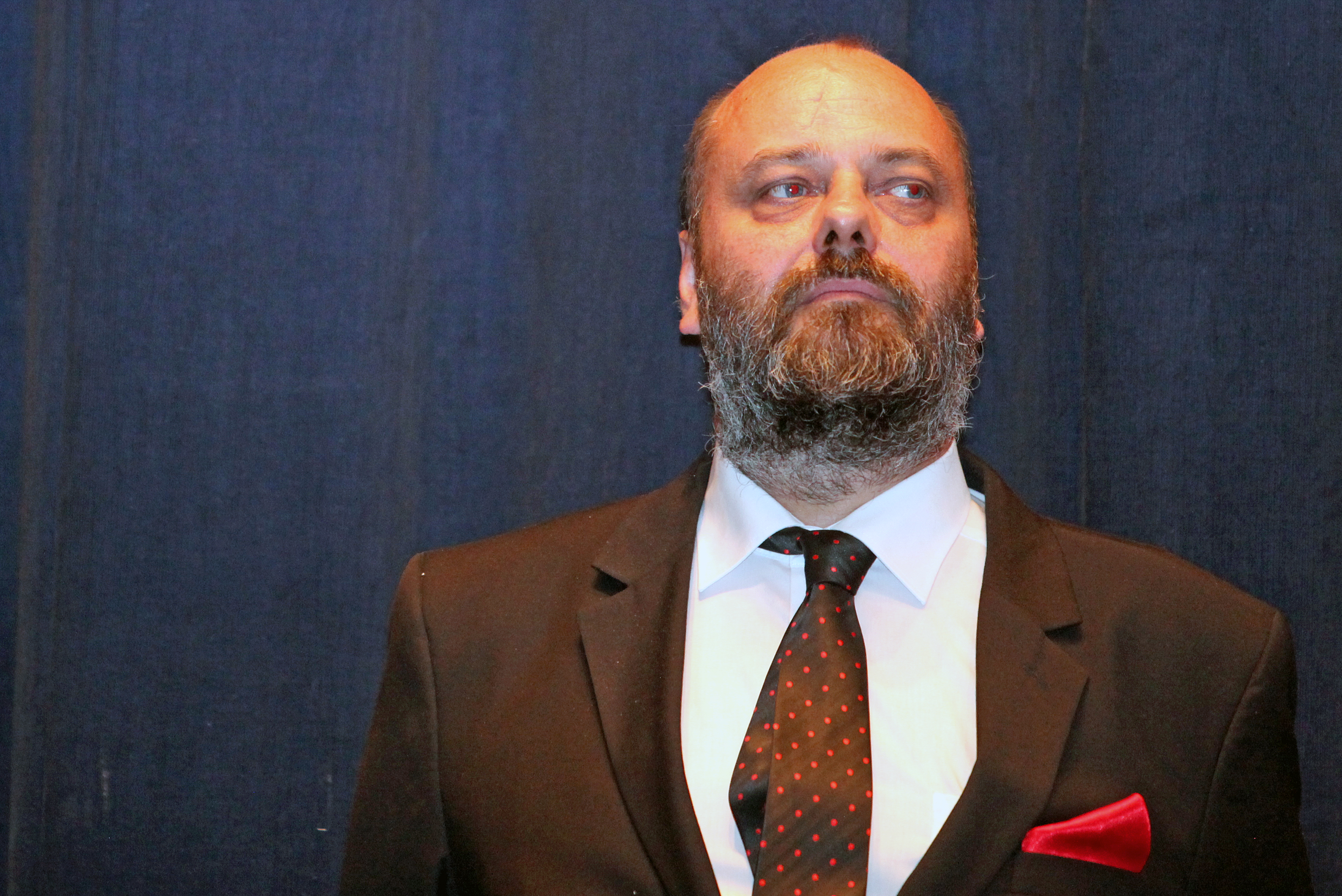
- Petr Jarchovsky at the 51st KVIFF
- Born: 6 October 1966 (age 58); Prague, Czechoslovakia
- Occupation: Screenwriter
- Years active: 1990–present

Petr Jarchovský (born 6 October 1966 in Prague) is a Czech screenwriter, whose writing credits include Big Beat (1993), Cosy Dens (1999), and Divided We Fall (2000). Jarchovský is a frequent and long-term collaborator with director Jan Hřebejk.

== Career ==
Jarchovský attended high school in Prague and then, from 1987 to 1991, at the Film and TV School of the Academy of Performing Arts in Prague, alongside his high school classmate and future creative collaborator Jan Hřebejk. His screenwriting debut was a collaboration with another classmate, Igor Chaun, on a project entitled Very Believable Stories. Around this time, Jarchovský and Hřebejk also co-wrote a film based on Hřebejk's experiences of socialist summer camps, entitled Let's All Sing A Song, which was later made into a feature film by Ondřej Trojan in his directorial debut.

Jarchovský and Hřebejk's breakthrough came in 1993 with the film Big Beat, a rock and roll comedy set in the 1950s, written by Jarchovský and Hřebejk from a story by Petr Šabach. The film won the Czech Lion award for Best Film in 1993. In 1997 Jarchovský and Hřebejk received awards from the Film and Television Association and the Literary Fund for three episodes they had written for the TV series Bachelors, which were awarded for their contribution to dramatic television programming.

The writing and production team behind Big Beat subsequently reunited for two further films, Cosy Dens (Czech: Pelíšky; 1999) and Divided We Fall (Czech: Musíme si pomáhat; 2000), both of which became enormously successful within the Czech Republic. Jarchovský also wrote the screenplay for Želary (2003), directed by Ondrej Trojan, which was nominated for the Academy Award for Best Foreign Language Film in 2004.

Jarchovský also teaches at the Department of Screenwriting and Script Editing at FAMU, and works as a script editor for Czech Television.

== Filmography ==
=== Feature films ===
- 1991: Let's All Sing Around
- 1993: Big Beat (Czech: Šakalí léta; writer)
- 1999: Cosy Dens (Czech: Pelíšky; writer)
- 2000: Divided We Fall (Czech: Musíme si pomáhat; screenplay) / (story)
- 2000: Out of the City (Czech: Cesta z města; additional story)
- 2003: Pupendo (writer)
- 2003: Želary (writer)
- 2004: Up and Down (Czech: Horem pádem)
- 2006: Beauty in Trouble (Czech: Kráska v nesnázích)
- 2007: Teddy Bear (Czech: Medvídek; screenplay)
- 2008: I'm All Good (Czech: U me dobrý; screenplay)
- 2009: Kawasaki's Rose (Czech: Kawasakiho růže; screenplay)
- 2010: Identity Card (Czech: Občanský průkaz)
- 2011: Innocence (Czech: Nevinnost; screenplay)
- 2013: Honeymoon (Czech: Líbánky)
- 2013: Klauni
- 2016: The Teacher (Slovak: Učiteľka)
- Zahradnictví: Nápadník
  - 2016: Zloději zelených koní
  - 2017: Zahradnictví: Rodinný přítel
  - 2017: Zahradnictví: Dezertér

=== Television ===
- 1991: Velmi uveritelné príbehy (writer – 1 episode: "Dlazdice" (1991))
- 1997: Bakaláři (writer – 1 episode: "Dobrá zpráva" (1997))
- 1997: Okno (TV Short)
- 2013–2014: Škoda lásky (screenplay – 3 episodes: "S jedním uchem naveselo" (2014); "Úspěšný lov" (2014); "Škoda lásky" (2013))
- 2014: Čtvrtá hvězda (dramatisation – 1 episode: "Hodina H." (2014))
- 2015: Případ pro exorcistu (TV Mini-Series) (adaptation – 3 episodes: Episode 1.1, 1.2, 1.3 (2015))
- 2016: Modré stíny (TV Mini-Series) (Episodes 1–4 (2016))
- 2016: Pět mrtvých psů (TV Mini-Series) (writer – episodes 1–3 (2016))
