= Michal Novinski =

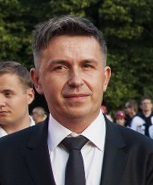
- Michal Novinski at Czech Lion Award 2012 ceremony

Background information
- Born: Michal Ničík; 4 October 1971 (age 54); Žilina, Czechoslovakia
- Genres: Film score, Theatre music, contemporary classical music
- Occupations: Composer, conductor
- Years active: 1992–present
- Website: www.michalnovinski.com

Michal Novinski (born Michal Ničík 4 October 1971) is a Slovak composer. He is best known for his film scores and theatre music. He received two Czech Lion Awards for scores for the films Kooky and In the Shadow.

== Career ==
Novinski's career started when he was 19 with a commission from the Slovak National Theatre for a ballet The Light in the Darkness (Slovak: Svetlo v tme), directed and choreographed by Ondrej Šoth. The success of this project was followed by a collaboration with the Slovak mime artist Milan Sládek. Novinski eventually worked with prestigious theaters in Slovakia, the Czech Republic and Hungary, including the National Theatre in Prague and Vígszínház Theatre in Budapest.

He was awarded Czech Film and Television Academy Award Czech Lion for Best Music for the film Kooky (Czech: Kuky se vrací, 2010), directed by the Oscar-winning director Jan Svěrák. He also won Slovak Film and Television Academy Sun in a Net Award in 2010 for the Best Original Score for Jiří Chlumský’s film Broken Promise (Slovak: Nedodržaný sľub, 2009) and in 2014 for the Best Original Score for David Ondříček's film In the Shadow (Czech: Ve stínu, 2012), together with Jan P. Muchow. In 2016 he won the FICX Award for the Best Original Score for the film The Teacher (2016) at the 54. Gijon International Film Festival, Spain.

Novinski’s recent works include original score for the critically acclaimed film In the Shadow (Czech: Ve stínu, 2012) by David Ondříček, co-written with his longtime collaborator Jan P. Muchow. The film received the Czech Film Critics’ Award 2012 and Czech Golden Lion Award 2012 for the best original score, among other prizes.

== Filmography ==
=== Film ===
- Only Beautiful Things to Look At by Ivan Ostrochovsky (2026)
- What a way to go by Jan Svěrák (2026)
- The Champion by Jakub Červenka (2026)
- Zuckerkandl by Pavel Jandourek (2025)
- Living Large by Kristina Dufkova (2024)
- Team Havnaa by Bård Breien (2024)
- Photophobia by Ivan Ostrochovský (2023)
- Světýlka by Beata Parkanová (2023)
- Muž, který stál v ceste by Petr Nikolaev (2023)
- Kappa by Slobodan Maksimovic (2022)
- Zupa nic by Kinga Debska (2021)
- Na značky! (On your marks!) by MariaPinčíková (2021)
- Dragon Girl by Katarína Launing (2020)
- Služobníci (Servants) by Ivan Ostrochovsky (2020)
- Anatomie zrady (Betrayer) by Biser A. Arichtev (2020)
- Hodinárov učeň (Watchmaker's apprentice) by Jitka Rudolfová (2019)
- Persona Grata by Daniela Krajčová (2019)
- Ostrým nožom (By a sharp knife) by Teodor Kuhn (2019)
- TOMAN by Ondrej Trojan (2018)
- Zabawa Zabawa by Kinga Debska (2018)
- Plan B by Kinga Debska (2018)
- Po strništi bos (Barefoot) by Jan Svěrák (2017)
- Žlta (Yellow) by Ivana Šebestová (2017)
- Sloboda pod nakládom (Freedom Under Load) by Pavol Barabáš (2016)
- Učiťelka (The Teacher) by Jan Hřebejk (2016)
- 5. október (5. October) by Martin Kollár (2015)
- vlna vs. breh (wave vs. shore) by Martin Štrba (2014)
- Andělé (Angels) by Alice Nellis (2014)
- Tři bratři (Three Brothers) by Jan Svěrák (2014)
- Ve Stinu (In the Shadow) by David Ondříček (2012)
- Tigre v Meste (Tigers in the City) by Juraj Krasnohorský (2012)
- Trou De Fer (The Iron Hole) by Pavol Barabáš (2011)
- Kto Je Tam? by Vanda Raýmanová (2010)
- Mongolsko - V Tieni Dzingischana (Mongolia: In the Shadow of Genghis Khan) by Pavol Barabáš (2010)
- Kooky by Jan Svěrák (2010)
- Nedodržaný sľub (Broken Promise) by Jiří Chlumský (2009)
- Carstensz - Siedma Hora (Carstensz - The Seventh Summit) by Pavol Barabáš (2008)
- Neznáma Antarktída by Pavol Barabáš (2007)
- Tepuy - Cesta Do Hlbin Zeme (Tepuy - Journey to the Depths of the Earth) by Pavol Barabáš (2006)
- Pururambo by Pavol Barabáš (2005)
- Amazonia Vertical by Pavol Barabáš (2005)
- Omo - Cesta do praveku by Pavol Barabáš (2002)

=== Television ===
- Kriminálka Anděl séria 8 (2026)
- Extraktoři séria 2 (2026)
- Kriminálka Anděl séria 7 (2025)
- Bora (2025)
- Kriminálka Anděl séria 6 (2024)
- Kriminálka Anděl (2023)
- Extraktoři (2023)
- Víťaz (2023)
- Anatomie zrady (Betrayer) (2020)
- Kriminálka Anděl (2008 - 2014)
- Mesto tieňov (City of the Shadows) (2008)
- Ordinace v ružové zahrade (1 episode, 2006)

=== Awards and nominations ===
- 1993, won Litfond Award for Music for Cyrano at Theatre Astroka Korzo
- 1999, DOSKY Award for 'Best Theatre Music'
- 2004, DOSKY Award for 'Best Theatre Music'
- 2006, DOSKY Award for 'Best Theatre Music'
- 2010, won Sun in a Net Award for 'Best Original Music Score' for Broken Promise (2009)
- 2011, won Film Europe Award at IFF Bratislava for 'successful presentation of Slovak film Abroad'
- 2011, won Czech Lion for 'Best Film Music' for Kooky (2010)
- 2012, won Czech Film Critics Award for 'Best Original Score' for In the Shadow (2012)
- 2013, won Czech Lion for 'Best Original Score' for In the Shadow (2013)
- 2014, won Sun in a Net Award for 'Best Original Music Score' for In the Shadow
- 2014, nominated for Czech Lion Award (Český Lev) for the 'Best Original Score' for films Three Brothers (2014) and Angels (2014)
- 2016, won FICX Award for the Best Original Score for the film The Teacher (2016) at the 54. Gijon International Film Festival, Spain
- 2017, won Sun in a Net Award for the Best Music for the film The Teacher
- 2018, nominated for Czech Lion Award (Český Lev) for the 'Best Original Score' for film Barefoot (2017)
- 2019, nominated for Czech Lion Award (Český Lev) for the 'Best Original Score' for film "TOMAN" (2018)
- 2020, won Czech Lion Award (Český Lev) for the 'Best Original Score' for film The Watchmaker apprentice (2019) co-author: Ivan Acher
- 2025, won Czech Lion Award (Český Lev) for the 'Best Original Score' for film Living Large (2024)
- 2025, won Sun in a Net Award for the Best Music for the film Living Large (2024)
