= Midi Lidi =

Czech electro band

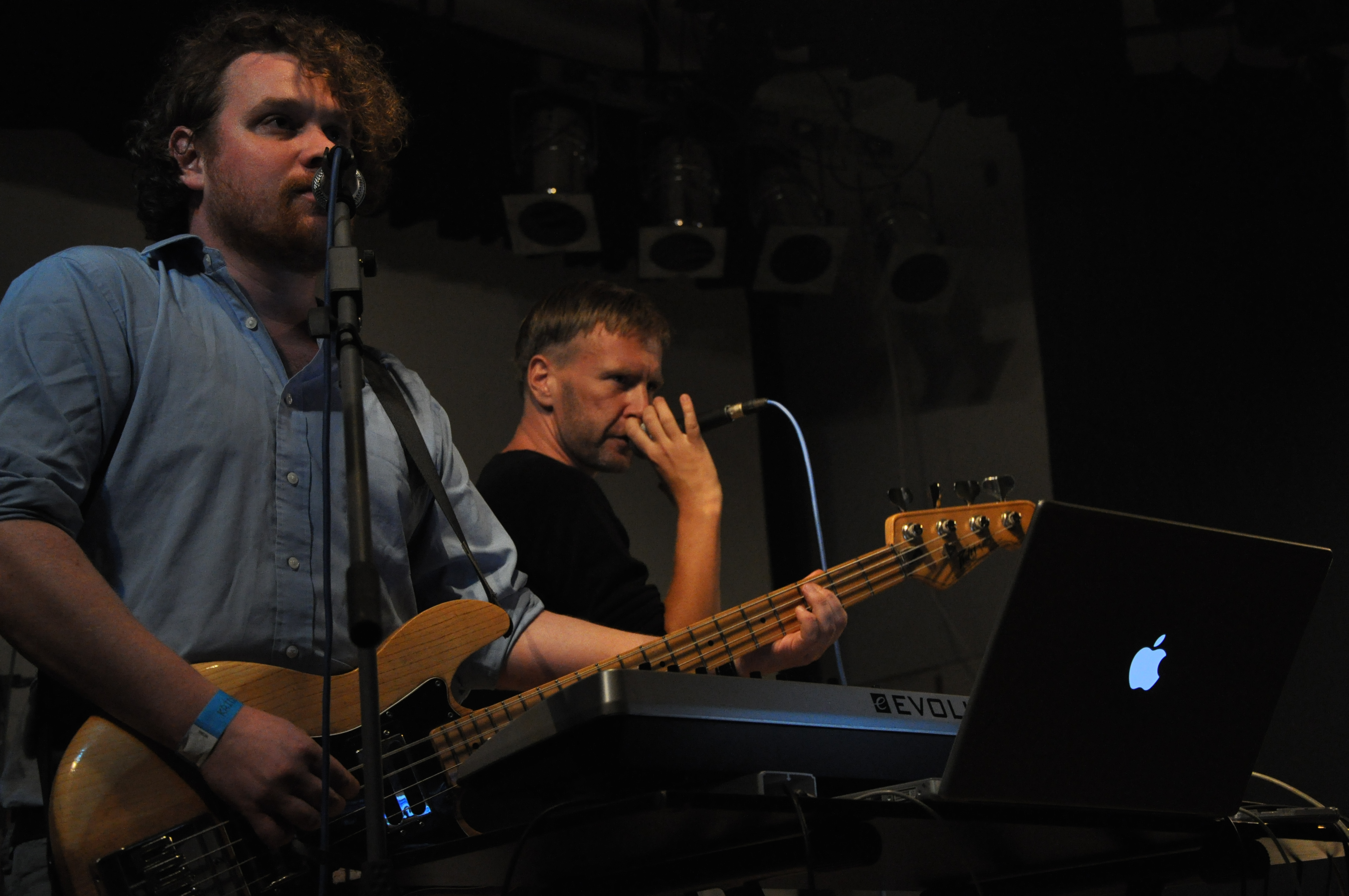
- Midi Lidi performing in 2012

Background information
- Origin: Brno, Czech Republic
- Genres: Electro
- Years active: 2006–present
- Members: Petr Marek; Prokop Holoubek; Tomáš Kelar; Magdalena Hrubá
- Past members: Markéta Lisá
- Website: midilidi.com

Midi Lidi are a Czech electro band formed in 2006, consisting of Petr Marek (vocals, synths, keyboards), Prokop Holoubek (vocals, drums, guitar, keyboards, clarinet), Tomáš Kelar (drums, vocals, synths, keyboards), and Magdalena Hrubá (vocals, synths). The band initially included Markéta Lisá (vocals, synths, keyboards, saxophone), who left in 2023. Apart from releasing six studio albums, they have also composed music for the Marek Najbrt films Protector (2009), Polski film (2012), and Prezident Blaník (2018), the 2010 Jan Němec film Heart Beat 3D, as well as the 2010 Vít Klusák/Filip Remunda documentary Czech Peace.

Marek has written music for Najbrt's first film, Mistři (2004), and the television series Život a doba soudce A. K.

In 2023, Holoubek won the Annual OSA Prize for most successful international songwriter.

== Awards and nominations ==
- Protector – Czech Lion Award for Best Music (won, 2009)
- Czech Peace – Czech Film Critics' Award for best music (won, 2010)
- "Lux" (Give Masterpiece a Chance!) – Anděl Award for best music video (nominated, 2016)

== Band members ==
Current

- Petr Marek – vocals, synths, keyboards
- Prokop Holoubek – vocals, drums, guitar, keyboards, clarinet
- Tomáš Kelar – drums, vocals, synths, keyboards
- Magdalena Hrubá – vocals, synths

Past

- Markéta Lisá – vocals, synths, keyboards, saxophone

== Discography ==
Studio albums

- Čekání na robota (2007)
- Hastrmans, Tatrmans & Bubáks (2009)
- Operace "Kindigo!" (2011)
- Give Masterpiece a Chance! (2016)
- Nikdo se ti nebude smát, když budeš mít lidi rád (2021)
- Heal the World, konečně! (2021)

Soundtracks

- Protector (2009)
- Czech Peace (2010)
- Heart Beat 3D (2010)
- Polski film (2012)
- Kancelář Blaník (2013)
- Prezident Blaník (2018)
