= Czech Lion Award for Most Popular Film =

Czech film award

- Country: Czech Republic
- First award: 1993–2012
- Website: https://www.filmovaakademie.cz

Czech Lion Award for Most Popular Film was an award given to the film that was most successful in Czech cinema. It was ended in 2013. Until 1999 the category also allowed foreign films to be awarded.

== Winners ==
| Year | English Name | Czech Name | Director | Country |
|---|---|---|---|---|
| 1993 | Jurassic Park | Jurský park | Steven Spielberg | United States |
| 1994 | Accumulator 1 | Akumulátor 1 | Jan Svěrák | Czech Republic |
| 1995 | Waterworld | Vodní svět | Kevin Reynolds | United States |
| 1996 | Independence Day | Den nezávislosti | Roland Emmerich | United States |
| 1997 | Men in Black | Muži v černém | Barry Sonnenfeld | United States |
| 1998 | Titanic | Titanic | David Cameron | United States |
| 1999 | Cosy Dens | Pelíšky | Jan Hřebejk | Czech Republic |
| 2000 | The Princess from the Mill 2 | Princezna ze mlejna 2 | Zdeněk Troška | Czech Republic |
| 2001 | Dark Blue World | Tmavomodrý svět | Jan Svěrák | Czech Republic; United Kingdom |
| 2002 | Year of the Devil | Rok ďábla | Petr Zelenka | Czech Republic |
| 2003 | Pupendo | Pupendo | Jan Hřebejk | Czech Republic |
| 2004 | Snowboarders | Snowboarďáci | Karel Janák | Czech Republic |
| 2005 | From Subway with Love | Román pro ženy | Filip Renč | Czech Republic |
| 2006 | Rafters | Rafťáci | Karel Janák | Czech Republic |
| 2007 | Empties | Vratné lahve | Jan Svěrák | Czech Republic |
| 2008 | Bathory | Bathory | Juraj Jakubisko | Slovakia; Czech Republic |
| 2009 | You Kiss like a God | Líbáš jako Bůh | Marie Poledňáková | Czech Republic |
| 2010 | Women in Temptation | Ženy v pokušení | Jiří Vejdělek | Czech Republic |
| 2011 | Men in Hope | Muži v naději | Jiří Vejdělek | Czech Republic |
| 2012 | You Kiss like a Devil | Líbáš jako ďábel | Marie Poledňáková | Czech Republic |
