= Living Large (film) =

- Directed by: Kristina Dufková
- Written by: Petr Jarchovský; Anna Vášová; Barbora Dřevikovská
- Produced by: Matěj Chlupáček
- Starring: Hugo Kovács; Tatiana Dyková; David Novotný; Klára Melíšková
- Cinematography: Václav Fronk
- Music by: Michal Novinski
- Production companies: Barletta; Czech Television; NOVINSKI; Novanima Productions
- Distributed by: Aerofilms
- Release dates: June 2024 (Annecy); 29 June 2024 (Karlovy Vary); 17 October 2024 (Czech Republic)
- Running time: 79 minutes
- Countries: Czech Republic; Slovakia; France
- Language: Czech
- Budget: 25,500,000 CZK

Living Large (Czech: Život k sežrání) is a 2024 animated coming-of-age comedy film directed by Kristina Dufková.

== Plot ==
The film, about "overweight, love, and the love of food," focuses on twelve-year-old Ben Pipette, who loves food, plays in a band, and falls in love with his classmate Claire.

== Cast ==
- Hugo Kovács
- Tatiana Dyková
- David Novotný
- Klára Melíšková
- Simona Babčáková
- Martha Issová
- Jiří Bartoška

== Production ==
The film is produced by produced by Matěj Chlupáček of Barletta and coproduced by Czech Television, NOVINSKI and Novanima Productions. Story is based on the book of the same name by French writer Mikaël Ollivier. The screenplay was written by Petr Jarchovský, Anna Vášová and Barbora Dřevikovská, and the animation was done using a Nikon Z6 camera.

== Reception ==
The film was nominated for the competition at the Annecy Film Festival in France and won Contrechamp Jury Distinction Award.
