= Big Beat (film) =

- Directed by: Jan Hřebejk
- Written by: Jan Hřebejk; Petr Jarchovský; Petr Šabach
- Produced by: Pavel Solc
- Starring: Jakub Špalek; Martin Dejdar; Sylva Tománková; Josef Abrhám; Jiří Ornest; Jan Semotán; Jitka Asterová
- Cinematography: Jan Malíř
- Edited by: Jan Mattlach
- Music by: Ivan Hlas
- Distributed by: Space Films
- Release date: 1993
- Running time: 110 minutes
- Country: Czech Republic
- Language: Czech

Big Beat (Czech: Šakalí léta) is a 1993 Czech musical comedy directed by Jan Hřebejk. It is set in 1959 in Prague's Hotel International. The film was Hřebejk's breakthrough box-office hit and the first feature film made by Hřebejk and Petr Jarchovsky as a directing-writing team. Jarchovsky wrote the script based on a story by Petr Šabach. The music and lyrics were written for the film by singer-songwriter Ivan Hlas, and veteran cameraman Jan Malir also worked on the film. The film won four Czech Lion awards, including Best Film of 1993, Best Director (Hřebejk), Best Actor (Josef Abrhám) and Best Original Score.

== Plot ==
The film is set in 1959 in and around the Hotel International. A young man calling himself "Baby" (Martin Dejdar) arrives at the home of Prokop (Josef Abrhám) and his family, ostensibly to care for their mutual elderly relative. Baby wears eccentric clothes, plays guitar, and has a passion for rock 'n' roll, and quickly starts to disrupt the lives of those in the local community.

Prokop is struggling with health problems relating to an accident, including a loss of his sense of taste. His son Kšanda (Jan Semotán) hangs around with a local gang, and his daughter Bejbina (Sylva Tománková) is courting Eda (Jakub Špalek), a waiter at the hotel. Baby quickly charms Kšanda's gang and takes Kšanda under his wing, and also makes a name for himself at the hotel, but Prokop is suspicious of his music and appearance. Relations between Prokop and Kšanda deteriorate, until Kšanda and his friend mistakenly deliver a jug of urine to a dinner party Prokop is hosting for his superiors at work, and Kšanda runs away from home. Eda, meanwhile, becomes suspicious of how much time Bejbina is spending with Baby and begins to flirt with Milada (Jitka Asterová), a singer at the hotel. They go back to Milada's house, but Eda has a change of heart and they spend the night playing cards.

The next day Baby, Eda, Milada, Bejbina, and several others members of the gang go to see a rock'n'roll band called The Red Devils. On the journey home their car crashes into a lake, and they are forced to take it to the mechanic workshop of one of their fathers. While there an argument starts between Eda and Baby over Bejbina, during which Eda tells Bejbina that Baby has got Milada pregnant. One of the gang members who is present for the argument tells his father, a communist informer, who tells Milada's husband, a senior communist dignitary, what has happened. Furious, the husband comes to Prokop's house to look for Baby, injuring Prokop in the process. After he leaves Prokop offers Baby a conciliatory meal, during which he realises he has recovered his taste.

Baby is forced to leave town, but all the characters' lives have been touched by his presence. The film descends into a series of more abstract musical numbers, during which Eda, having lost Bejbina but realising the error of his ways, ruins a communist party event at the hotel by bursting into song. Eda then leads the gang in an arson attack on a car driven by a party chauffeur, and the gang are observed happily reunited, including Eda and Bejbina. The film ends with a solo performance outside the school from Kšanda, who has fully adopted Baby's style and attitude.

== Cast ==
- Jakub Špalek as Eda Drábek
- Martin Dejdar as Baby
- Josef Abrhám as Prokop
- Sylva Tománková as Bejbina
- Jan Semotán as Ksanda
- Jitka Asterová as Milada
- Jiří Ornest as Milada's husband
- Jan Kacani as Reddy
- Pavel Janoušek as Mr. Neumann
- Saša Rašilov as Mr. Peterka
- Zdeněk Vencl as Mr. Babka
- Václav Chalupa as Mr. Hamáček
- Václav Jakoubek as Petykoluna
- Radek Holub as Chief of Gang
- Raoul Schránil as Waiter
- Josef Oplt as singer
