= Kancelář Blaník =

Czech web series

- Genre: Comedy
- Directed by: Marek Najbrt, Bohdan Sláma, Jaroslav Fuit
- Starring: Marek Daniel, Michal Dalecký, Halka Třešňáková
- Country of origin: Czech Republic
- Original language: Czech
- No. of seasons: 5
- No. of episodes: 75

Production
- Running time: 7 minutes

Original release
- Network: Stream.cz
- Release: April 13, 2014 – May 10, 2017

Kancelář Blaník (The Office Blanik) is a Czech web series that premiered between 2014 and 2018 on internet television Stream.cz. The main role of lobbyist Tonda Blaník is played by Marek Daniel, his assistants are Michal Dalecký and Halka Třešňáková. The directors are Marek Najbrt and Bohdan Sláma. It was written by Robert Geisler, Benjamin Tuček, Marek Najbrt, Tomáš Hodan, Jan Bartes, Milan Kuchynka and also Marek Daniel. Related film Prezident Blaník was released in 2018.

== Form and inspiration ==
The behind-the-scenes series of Czech politics is loosely inspired by the British series The Thick of It. and at the same time by Czech police wiretapping that leaked to the media. Individual episodes are created on the basis of public media reports on current cases that resonate in society.

The main character is the lobbyist Tonda Blaník, who works on behalf of Czech politicians, can arrange the impossible, and his office therefore functions as an "alternative power center of Czech politics". The title of the series and the name of the main character are derived from Prague's Blaník passage, in which, according to a modern myth, a kind of "shadow municipality" led by businessmen Roman Janoušek and Karel Stejskal operated during the era of Mayor Pavel Bém.

The plot is based on dialogues, especially by Tonda Blaník, who is constantly on the phone, and contains many allusions to the current Czech social reality. The directing style approaches the mockumentary trend, thanks to the use of a seemingly amateur camera, the impression is created that it is not a fictional series, but rather a documentary.

== Cast ==
- Marek Daniel as Antonín „Tonda“ Blaník, lobbyist and owner of Office Blaník
- Michal Dalecký as Luboš „Žížala“ Havránek, Blaník's assistant
- Halka Třešňáková as Lenka, Blaník's secretary
