= František Plesnivý =

Austro-Hungarian architect

- Born: 4 April 1845; Unhošť; Austria
- Died: 9 August 1918 (aged 73); Villa Gabriela; Königgrätz; Austria-Hungary
- Occupation: Architect
- Spouse: Gabriela Plesnivá
- Children: Ferdinand (1882–1934)
- Awards: Silver Medal of the City of Prague
- Buildings: Ettrichova Vila; Villa Gabriela

Signature
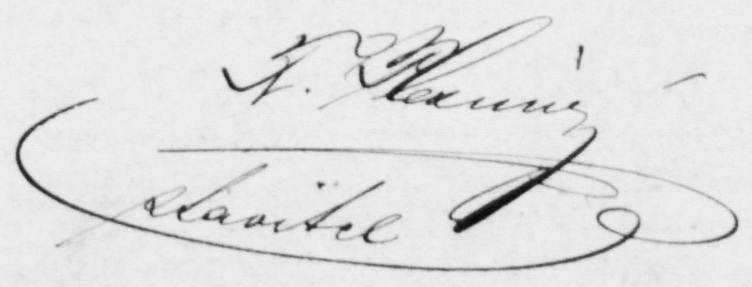

František Plesnivý (4 April 1845 – 9 August 1918) was a Czech architect known for his Art Nouveau early designs and utilitarian later designs. Among his many buildings are Ettrichova Vila (1873), the Jaroměř (present-day Czech Republic) house featured prominently in Jan Hřebejk's 2000 film Divided We Fall, which during the late 19th century was frequented by such admirers as Emperor Franz Joseph I, and the Lederer & Adler "mechanical shoe factory" in Litomyšl (1910).

In 1897 František Plesnivý designed and constructed a villa for his family in Königgrätz, Villa Gabriela, named after his wife. During the early 20th century Plesnivý also designed and built churches, experimental factories and public utility structures such as water towers.

František Plesnivý died on 9 August, 1918, in Villa Gabriela, Königgrätz.

== Distinctions ==
In 1898, at the Architecture and Engineering Exhibition, Plesnivý was awarded the Silver Medal of the City of Prague.
