= Život a doba soudce A. K. =

Czech television series

- Genre: Legal drama
- Written by: Zdeněk Zapletal
- Directed by: Robert Sedláček, Radim Špaček, Bohdan Sláma, Petr Marek
- Starring: David Švehlík
- Country of origin: Czech Republic
- Original language: Czech
- No. of seasons: 2
- No. of episodes: 26

Production
- Running time: 52-57 minutes

Original release
- Network: ČT1
- Release: September 14, 2014 – November 20, 2017

Život a doba soudce A. K. (English: The Life and Time of Judge A.K.) is a Czech television series from a court setting with David Švehlík in the title role. The directors are Robert Sedláček, Radim Špaček and Bohdan Sláma. The script was written by Zdeněk Zapletal. Some of the civil cases handled in the first season are inspired by real-life cases. Second season deals with criminal cases.

Filming of the first season of the series began in September 2013.

Czech Television announced its intention to begin broadcasting the series in autumn 2014. Later it was specified that the series could appear on the screens during September. subsequently, it was specified that it should be from 1 September 2014.

The first season of the series was also published as a book.

Zdeněk Zapletal announced at the World of Books 2015 fair that the second season of the series is in development, the filming of which will begin in 2016. On June 18, 2015, Czech Television also announced preparations for the second series.

== Plot ==
The series deals with justice system after Velvet Revolution. Each episode deals with one civil court case, such as a conflict between a famous artist and a tabloid, a dispute over child care, divorce, alimony, libel, copyright, home birth, bullying at school, a case where the paternity of a dead priest is proven, or an effort to forcibly evict tenants. At the end of each episode, a verdict is handed down and a new case is opened.

At the same time, personal life of the protagonist develops in the series. Judge Adam Klos (David Švehlík) is an introverted and empathetic man in his forties. However, he is haunted by his personal traumas. In the first episode, his long-time girlfriend Laura Medková (Zuzana Norisová) breaks up with him and he starts seeing psychologist Iva Seidlová (Jitka Čvančarová). He is attracted to her and she is not indifferent to him either. He is lonely and has problematic, unresolved, even conflicting relationship with his parents, and he begins to receive anonymous visits where someone threatens him with death. His friend, criminalist Igor Kubiš (Marek Daniel) helps him investigate anonymously. He is deeply affected by his cases and at the same time constantly struggles with the challenge of living up to family tradition - his father (Jiří Bartoška) is a constitutional judge and his mother (Daniela Kolářová) is a lawyer and a partner in a law firm. He became a judge despite wanting to be an airline pilot or a mountaineer-photographer. He likes sports, rowing and flying airplanes. He also knows that his father did something wrong in the past. His mother is also hiding something from him and often talks to the public prosecutor Houdková (Barbora Kodetová).

Disputes before the court and the reality of contemporary life are viewed both by the "objective truth of the law" and by the subjective view of the judge. The story is told from his point of view while his inner voice comments on the events. At the end of each episode, the name of the next episode is heard from his inner voice. One case ends with the suicide of one of the actors in the lawsuit, in another the mother of judge Adam Klos acts as a lawyer in the courtroom.

In the second season, Judge Adam Klos is promoted to a regional judge and deals with cases in criminal proceedings.

== Cast and characters ==
=== Main ===
- David Švehlík as judge JUDr. Adam Klos
- Daniela Kolářová as legal attorney JUDr. Julie Klosová, mother of Adam Klos
- Jiří Bartoška as judge JUDr. Adam Klos senior, father of Adam Klos
- Marek Daniel as criminalist pplk. Igor Kubiš, Adam Klos' friend
- Jitka Čvančarová as psychologist Mgr. Iva Seidlová

== Seasons and episodes ==
A total of 13 episodes in each season were filmed. Czech Television began broadcasting season 1 from 1 September 2014 with a weekly period.

== Directors ==
The directors divided up the individual cases - Robert Sedláček directed five cases (Osamělost, Paulusová versus Paulus, Válka pokračuje, Rodina a Kněz), Bohdan Sláma four cases (Luketka, Střelec, Kladivo na důchodce a Místo narození) and Radim Špaček four cases (Chudák skřítek Melichar, Diskrétní odpad, Odlišnost a Exekuce) - and each also directed one dramaturgical line of the judge's privacy - Bohdan Sláma directed the protagonist's relationships with his parents, Radim Špaček directed the action themes and Robert Sedláček directed the judge's relationships with women. The director of the dispute being addressed in the piece is listed first and highlighted.
