= Cosy Dens =

1999 Czech film

- Directed by: Jan Hřebejk
- Written by: Petr Jarchovský; Petr Šabach
- Produced by: Pavel Borovan; Ondřej Trojan
- Starring: Miroslav Donutil; Jiří Kodet; Simona Stašová; Emília Vášáryová; Bolek Polívka
- Cinematography: Jan Malíř
- Edited by: Vladimír Barák
- Music by: Ivan Hlas; Ivan Kral
- Distributed by: Czech Television
- Release date: 8 April 1999
- Running time: 115 minutes
- Country: Czech Republic
- Language: Czech
- Budget: 20,000,000 Kč
- Box office: 80,000,000 Kč

Cosy Dens (Czech: Pelíšky) is a 1999 Czech film directed by Jan Hřebejk. It is loosely based on the novel Hovno Hoří ("shit burns") by Petr Šabach. Readers of Reflex magazine voted it as the best Czech film in 2011. Cosy Dens was screened at the 1999 Vancouver International Film Festival.

== Synopsis ==
Cosy Dens is a bittersweet coming-of-age story set in the months from Christmas 1967 up to the 1968 Prague Spring. Teenager Michal Šebek has a crush on his upstairs neighbour, Jindřiška Krausová. Michal's family is led by a stubborn army officer who is a firm supporter of the Communist system and who believes that Communist technology will eventually triumph over "Western imperialist capitalism', while Jindřiška's father is an ardent foe of the Communists and a war hero, who has been imprisoned several times because of his outspoken opposition to the regime. He believes that "the Bolsheviks have a year left at most, maybe two". In contrast, the younger generation could not care less for politics. Instead, Michal sports a Beatles-style mop-top, while Elien, whose parents live in the United States, runs a local film group specialising in Hollywood and pre-war French films. Jindřiška eventually becomes Elien's girlfriend. After a wedding that unites the families, the film ends with the news of the invasion of Czechoslovakia by Warsaw Pact troops.

== Trivia ==
The Czech title is a plural and diminutive of the word "pelech", literally meaning animal den or burrow. It is used figuratively for a cosy place to sleep.

== Cast ==
- Michael Beran as Michal Šebek
- Ondřej Brousek as Elien
- Miroslav Donutil as Mr. Šebek
- Jaroslav Dušek as Saša Mašláň
- Eva Holubová as Eva (teacher)
- Boris Hybner as Magician
- Sylvie Koblížková as Uzlinka Šebková
- Jiří Kodet as Mr. Kraus
- Jiří Krejčík as Doctor Stárek
- Marek Morvai as Petr
- Kristýna Nováková as Jindřiška Krausová
- Bolek Polívka as Uncle
- Simona Stašová as Mrs. Šebková
- Emília Vášáryová as Mrs. Krausová
- Stella Zázvorková as Grandmother

== Soundtrack ==
The soundtrack to Cosy Dens was released in April 1999 and contains snippets of dialogue in addition to songs.

1. Blue Effect – "Slunečný hrob"
2. Miroslav Kaman, Jaroslav Dušek – "Dvě dávky"
3. Václav Neckář – "Tu kytaru jsem koupil kvůli tobě"
4. Bolek Polívka – "Nebe na zemi"
5. Kristýna Nováková, Michael Beran, Ondřej Brousek – "Kozačky..."
6. Petr Novák & Flamengo – "Povídej"
7. Kristýna Nováková, Michael Beran – "Něco jako příbuzný"
8. Waldemar Matuška – "Pojď se mnou, lásko má"
9. Emília Vášáryová, Jiří Kodet – "Dávám bolševikovi rok"
10. Hana Hegerová – "Čerešně"
11. Miroslav Donutil, Bolek Polívka, Silvie Koblížková – "Nerozbitná sklenička"
12. Kučerovci – "Ajo mama"
13. Miroslav Donutil, Michael Beran – "Gagarinův bratr"
14. Kučerovci – "La mulher rendeira"
15. Stella Zázvorková, Simona Stašová, Miroslav Donutil, Bolek Polívka – "Maršál Malinovskij"
16. Judita Čeřovská – "Je po dešti"
17. Eva Holubová, Jaroslav Dušek, Marek Morvai-Javorský – "Vyděržaj, pijaněr"
18. Václav Neckář – "Lékořice"
19. Emília Vášáryová, Kristýna Nováková, Jiří Kodet – "Noky"
20. Karel Gott – "Santa lucia"
21. Miroslav Donutil, Bolek Polívka, Jiří Kodet – "Kde udělali soudruzi z NDR chybu?"
22. Waldemar Matuška – "Mrholí"
23. Eva Holubová, Jaroslav Dušek, Marek Morvai-Javorský – "Hoří hovno...?"
24. Karel Gott & Olympic – "Trezor"
25. Jiří Kodet – "Proletáři všech zemí..."
26. The Matadors – "Get Down from the Tree"
27. The Soulmen – "Baby Do Not Cry"
28. The Soulmen – "I Wish I Were"
29. Blue Effect – "Snakes"
30. Miroslav Donutil, Bolek Polívka – "Průměrná ženská"
31. Blue Effect – "Sluneční hrob"
