= Kristýna Badinková Nováková =

Czech actress

- Born: Kristýna Nováková; 24 April 1983 (age 43); Prague, Czechoslovakia
- Occupation: Actress
- Years active: 1997–present
- Spouse: Viktor Badinka (m. 2018)
- Children: 3
- Relatives: Michaela Badinková (sister-in-law)

Kristýna Badinková Nováková, formerly Fuitová Nováková, née Nováková (born 24 April 1983) is a Czech film and television actress, born in Prague.

== Filmography (film and television) ==
- Honeymoon (2013)
- Ordinace v růžové zahradě (TV series, 2009) – Martina Tvrdíková
- Night Owls (2008) – Martina
- Taková normální rodinka (2008)
- Catch the Doctor! (2007) – Nurse Zuzanka Krízová
- Letiště (2006–2007) – Veronika Kliková
- The Ro©k Con Artists (2006) – Sárka
- Bazén (TV series, 2005)
- Rána z milosti (TV, 2005) – Marta
- Lovers & Murderers (2004)
- Seam Less (2003)
- Pátek čtrnáctého (TV, 2003)
- Nu, pogodi! (2000) – Hare
- Pelíšky (1999) – Jindřiška
- Kinetická encyklopedie vsehomíra (TV series, 1998)
- Bringing Up Girls in Bohemia (1997) – Agáta
