= Ladislav Hrušovský =

Slovak actor (born 1973)

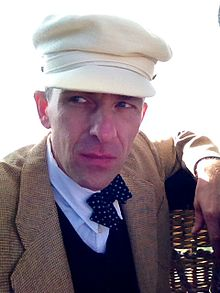
- Hrusovsky at a film set in Vienna
- Born: Ladislav Patrick Hrušovský; 4 January 1973 (age 52); Ružomberok, Europe
- Occupation(s): Actor, screenwriter,
- Years active: 2004–present
- Children: 1

Ladislav Hrušovský (born 4 January 1973) is a Slovak actor.

== Filmography ==
- 2007 - Demoni (film)
- 2007 - Mesto tieňov I (TV series)
- 2008 - Kriminálka Anděl (TV series)
- 2008 - Mesto tieňov II (TV series)
- 2009 - "Ako som prežil" (TV series)
- 2009 - Panelák (TV series)
- 2010 - 2011 - Aféry (TV series)
- 2013 - Agata Schindler's Diary (film)
- 2016 - Učiteľka (The Teacher) (film)
