= Ondřej Trojan =

Czech film producer, director, and actor (born 1959)

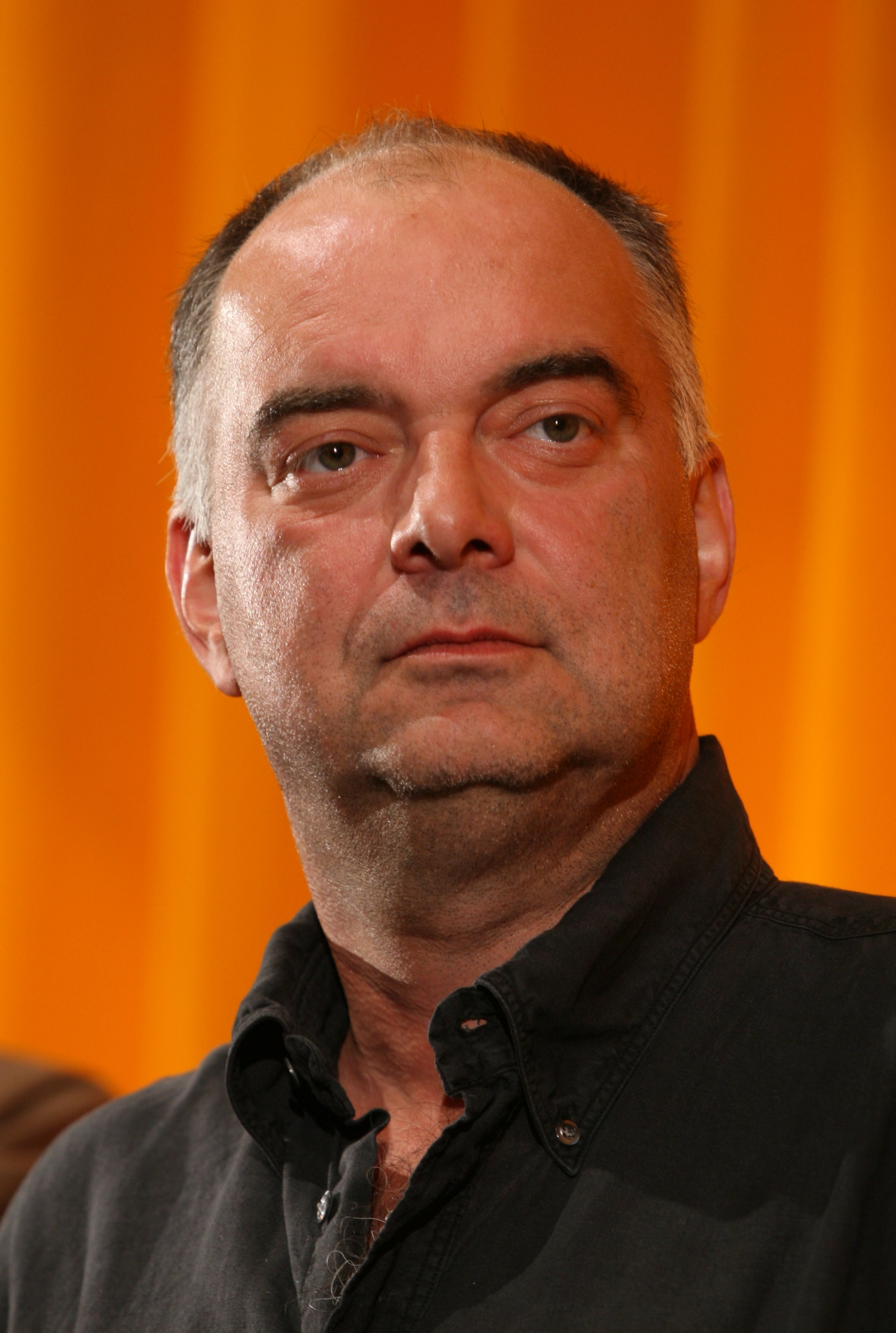
- Ondřej Trojan at 43rd KVIFF
- Born: 31 December 1959; Prague, Czechoslovakia (now Czech Republic)
- Occupations: Director, Producer
- Relatives: Ladislav Trojan (father), Ivan Trojan (brother)

Ondřej Trojan (Czech pronunciation: [ˈondr̝ɛj ˈtrojan]) (born 31 December 1959) is a Czech film producer, actor and film director. Two of the films he produced were nominated for the Academy Award for Best Foreign Language Film : Divided We Fall (2000) and Želary (2003), which he also directed. He is the brother of Ivan Trojan.

== Filmography ==
| Year | Title | Director | Producer |
|---|---|---|---|
| 2018 | Toman | Yes | Yes |
| 2010 | Identity Card | Yes | No |
| 2009 | El Paso | No | Yes |
| 2008 | I'm All Good | No | Yes |
| 2007-2010 | Forgotten Transports to Poland (documentary) | No | Yes |
| 2007 | Medvídek | No | Yes |
| 2006 | Beauty in Trouble | No | Yes |
| 2004 | Loop the Loop | No | Yes |
| 2003 | Želary | Yes | Yes |
| 2003 | Pupendo | No | Yes |
| 2002 | Cruel Joys | No | Yes |
| 2000 | Out of the City | No | Yes |
| 2000 | Divided We Fall | No | Yes |
| 1999 | Cosy Dens | No | Yes |
| 1991 | Let's All Sing Around | Yes | No |
