= A Song About the Gray Pigeon =

1961 film

- Film poster
- Directed by: Stanislav Barabáš
- Written by: Ivan Bukovcan; Albert Marenčin
- Starring: Radoslav Bartoník
- Cinematography: Vladimir Jesina
- Edited by: Maximilián Remen
- Release date: 1961
- Country: Czechoslovakia
- Language: Slovak

A Song About the Gray Pigeon (Slovak: Pieseň o sivom holubovi) is a 1961 Czechoslovak film directed by Stanislav Barabáš. It was entered into the 1961 Cannes Film Festival.

== Cast ==
- Radoslav Bartoník
- Vladimir Brecka
- Karla Chadimová
- Ladislav Chudík
- Vladimír Durdík
- Jana Hlavácová
- Karol Machata
- Pavel Mattos
- Pavle Polacek
- Olga Zöllnerová
