= Honeymoon (2013 film) =

2013 film

- Film poster
- Directed by: Jan Hřebejk
- Written by: Petr Jarchovský
- Produced by: Michal Kollar; Viktor Taus
- Starring: Anna Geislerová
- Cinematography: Martin Strba
- Edited by: Alois Fisárek
- Release date: 29 June 2013 (Karlovy IFF)
- Running time: 97 minutes
- Country: Czech Republic
- Language: Czech

Honeymoon (Czech: Líbánky) is a 2013 Czech drama film directed by Jan Hřebejk. It was nominated for the Crystal Globe at the 48th Karlovy Vary International Film Festival, where Hřebejk won the Best Director Award. The film was also screened in the Contemporary World Cinema section at the 2013 Toronto International Film Festival.

The film forms a loose trilogy with Hřebejk's previous films Kawasaki's Rose and Innocence, themed around guilt and forgiveness.

== Cast ==
- Anna Geislerová as Tereza
- Stanislav Majer as Radim
- Jiří Černý as Benda
- Bořivoj Čermák as Filip
- Daniela Choděrová as Filip's mother
- David Máj as Milan
- Kristýna Nováková as Renata
- Juraj Nvota as Priest
- Jiří Šesták as Karel
- Matěj Zikán as Dominik
