= Prezident Blaník =

2018 Czech satirical film

- Film poster
- Directed by: Marek Najbrt
- Written by: Tomáš Hodan; Robert Geisler; Jan Bartes; Benjamin Tuček; Marek Najbrt
- Produced by: Milan Kuchynka; Pavel Strnad
- Starring: Marek Daniel
- Music by: Midi Lidi
- Distributed by: Falcon
- Release dates: 30 January 2018 (preview); 1 February 2018
- Running time: 90 minutes
- Country: Czech Republic
- Language: Czech
- Budget: 18,500,000 CZK
- Box office: 23,774,663 CZK

Prezident Blaník is a Czech satirical film directed by Marek Najbrt. It stars Marek Daniel as a fictional Czech lobbyist Antonín "Tonda" Blaník. Blaník is the main protagonist of the satirical web series Kancelář Blaník. The film is about Blaník's candidacy in the 2018 presidential election.

== Background ==
The character of Tonda Blaník was introduced by web television Stream as a protagonist of the satirical series Kancelář Blaník. The series parodies Czech politics. On 12 October 2017, a video was released in which Blaník announced his candidacy for Czech president. The creators held meetings with people with Marek Daniel in character as Blaník. On 9 November 2017, Blaník attended the first presidential debate. On the same day the creators announced that Blaník's candidacy was part of the preparation for a new film called Prezident Blaník. The plot of the film would react to the actual election. Filming concluded on 20 December 2017. Multiple endings were filmed with the final ending to depend on the result of the real election.

== Synopsis ==
Tonda Blaník discovers that, according to one interpretation of the constitution, he would be able to sell the Czech Republic if he was President. He decides to sell the country to China and announces his candidacy for the 2018 presidential election and starts gathering signatures. He promises voters corruption available to everybody and Lithium for every family. He gathers 100,000 signatures but his assistant Žížala fails to bring the signatures to the Ministry of Interior, and Blaník is therefore not registered. He decides to support one of other candidates but doesn't know who will win. He decides to convince all the other candidates of his plan, with the exception of Miloš Zeman. Blaník subsequently has a change of heart and decides to support Zeman, because he is the only candidate who won't sell the Czech Republic to China. Blaník supports Zeman but finds out that Zeman sold the Czech republic to Russia and decides to steal the national jewels and flee the country. He changes his mind at the border.

== Cast ==
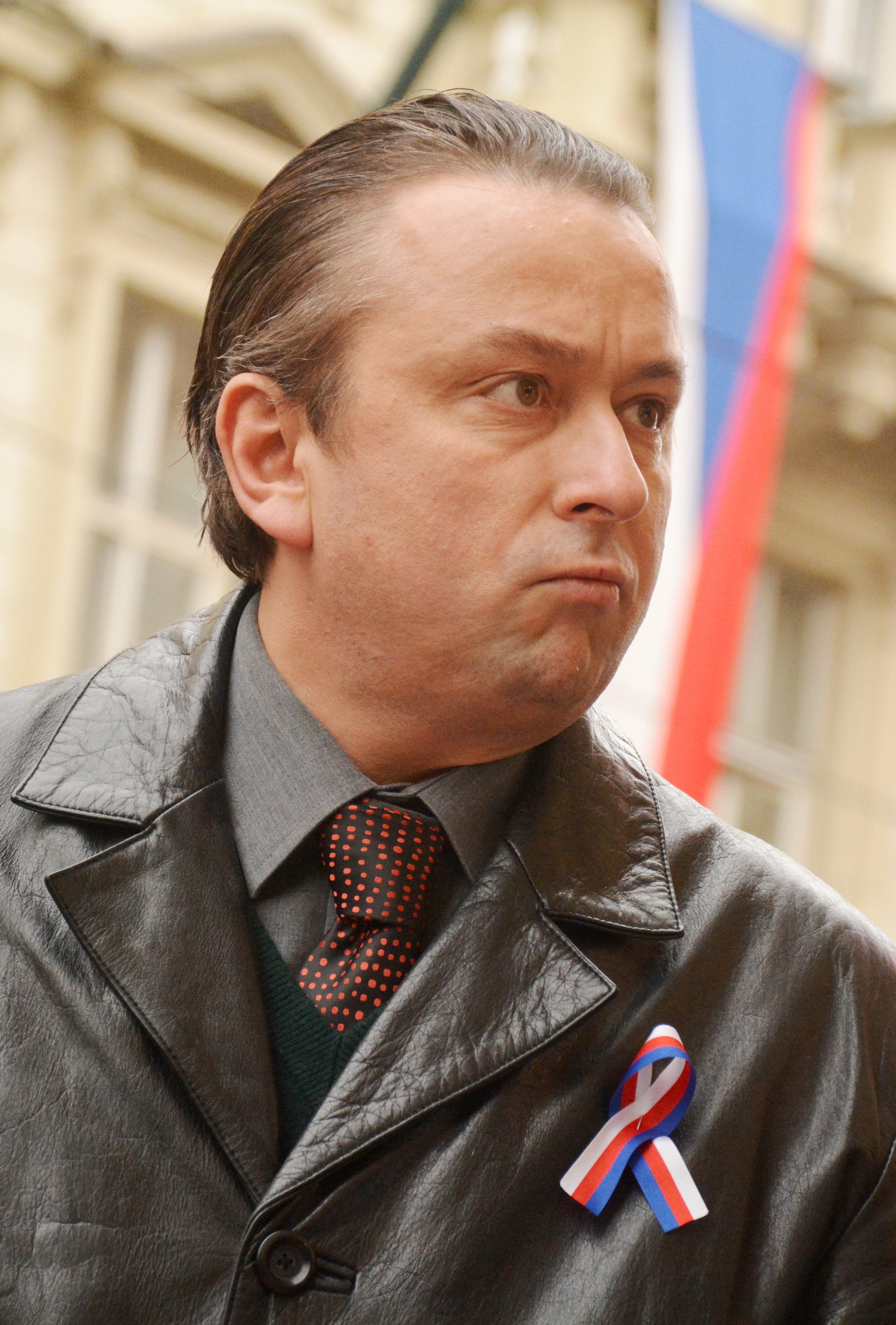
Marek Daniel as Tonda Blaník

- Marek Daniel as Tonda Blaník
- Michal Dalecký as Žížala
- Halka Třešňáková as Lenka
- Jakub Železný as himself
- Tomáš Sokol as himself
- Tomáš Sedláček as himself
- Ladislav Špaček as himself
- Tomáš Klus as himself
- Jan Potměšil as himself
- Helena Třeštíková as herself
- Ivo Mathé as himself
- Jan Hřebejk as himself
- Roman Vaněk as himself
- Olga Sommerová as herself
- Ivan Bartoš as himself (and a father of Lenka's son)

The film also features real presidential candidates such as Jiří Drahoš, Michal Horáček or Mirek Topolánek

== Release ==
The film was previewed on 30 January 2018 at Lucerna Cinema. The second preview was held on 31 January 2018. It was attended by Miroslav Kalousek and Jiří Drahoš. It premiered on 1 February 2018.
