= Babičky =

Babičky is a Czech novel, written by Petr Šabach. It was first published in 1999. The name of the novel, meaning "Grannies", is because the author relates personal experiences of his grandmothers in this humorous novel mixed with literary fiction.
