= U výčepu =

U výčepu ("In a Pub") is a Czech comedy play performed since 2010 in Czech Sign Language in the Čertovka Theatre in Prague.

== Cast ==
- Directed by Jaroslav Dušek.

The play is performed a deaf actors and actresses.

- Naďa Dingová
- Roman Vránek
- Kateřina Červinková-Houšková
- Fedor Krajčík
- Jiří Procházka
- Zuzana Hájková
- Jaroslav Milich
- Jaroslav Dušek
