= Kawasaki's Rose =

2009 film

- Film poster
- Directed by: Jan Hřebejk
- Written by: Petr Jarchovský
- Produced by: Rudolf Biermann; Tomás Hoffman
- Starring: Lenka Vlasáková
- Cinematography: Martin Sácha
- Edited by: Vladimír Barák
- Release date: 21 December 2009
- Running time: 100 minutes
- Country: Czech Republic
- Language: Czech

Kawasaki's Rose (Czech: Kawasakiho růže) is a 2009 Czech drama film directed by Jan Hřebejk. The film was selected in the Czech Republic as the Czech entry for the Best Foreign Language Film at the 83rd Academy Awards, but it did not make the final shortlist. It had already won two prizes from independent juries at the Berlinale, as well as the Golden Kingfisher and viewers' prizes at the Czech festival Finale Plzen.

The film is a study of memory, the repressive Communist era, and reconciliation. Along with Honeymoon (Líbánky), and Innocence, with this film Hrebejk presents a loose trilogy of films in which shadows from the past come to haunt the present of its characters.

== Cast ==
- Lenka Vlasáková as Lucie
- Milan Mikulčík as Luděk
- Martin Huba as Pavel
- Daniela Kolářová as Jana
- Antonín Kratochvíl as Bořek (as Antonín Kratochvíl)
- Anna Simonová as Bára
- Petra Hřebíčková as Radka
- Ladislav Chudík as Kafka
- Ladislav Smoček as Dr. Pešek
- Vladimír Kulhavý as Chief Physician

== See also ==
- List of submissions to the 83rd Academy Awards for Best Foreign Language Film
- List of Czech submissions for the Academy Award for Best Foreign Language Film
