= Where Butterflies Don't Fly =

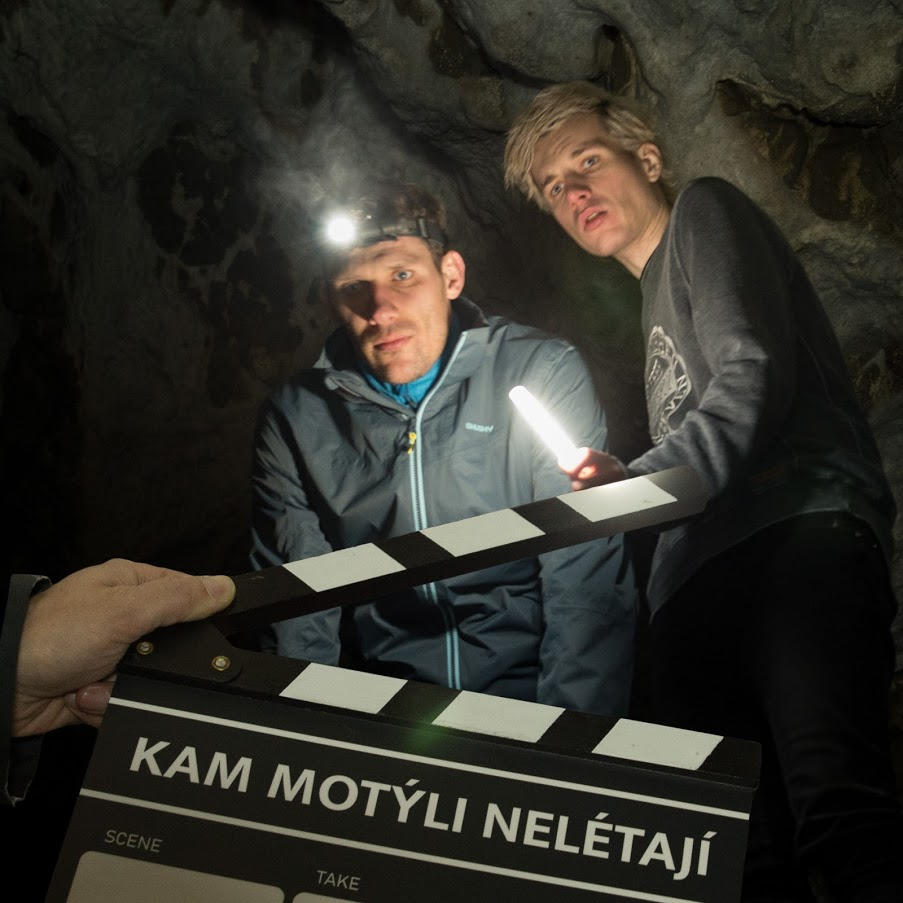
- Jiří Vojta (left) a Daniel Krejčík (right) in a cave
- Directed by: Roman Němec
- Starring: Daniel Krejčík, Jiří Vojta
- Release date: May 17, 2022
- Country: Czechia
- Language: Czech

Where Butterflies Don't Fly (Czech: Kam motýli nelétají) is the name of the feature film based on the original screenplay by Roman Němec. The main roles are performed by the theater actor Daniel Krejčík as a nineteen-year-old grammar school student and Jiří Vojta as his teacher. The movie premiered on May 16, 2022. The story takes place in Kadaň and cave complexes.

== Plot ==
Daniel lives with his parents and keeps a distance from other people. He will be turning nineteen though he does not spend time preparing for his graduation.

Adam is his classteacher. He is gay who lives in a relationship with his younger partner David and his strictly guarded secret keeps locked behind a door of their apartment.

Daniel and Adam live in their own bubbles until a moment when they find themselves together in a life-threatening situation. Lost in the darkness, cut off from the rest of the world, they are both looking for a way out. How far will they be willing to go?

== Cast ==
- Daniel Krejčík - Daniel
- Jiří Vojta - Adam
- Jaroslav Dušek - The school head
- Simona Babčáková - Teacher Stehlíková
- Klára Melíšková - Daniel's mother
- Martin Myšička - Daniel's father
- Jakub Krejča - David
