= Boris Hybner =

Czech actor, director, and mime artist

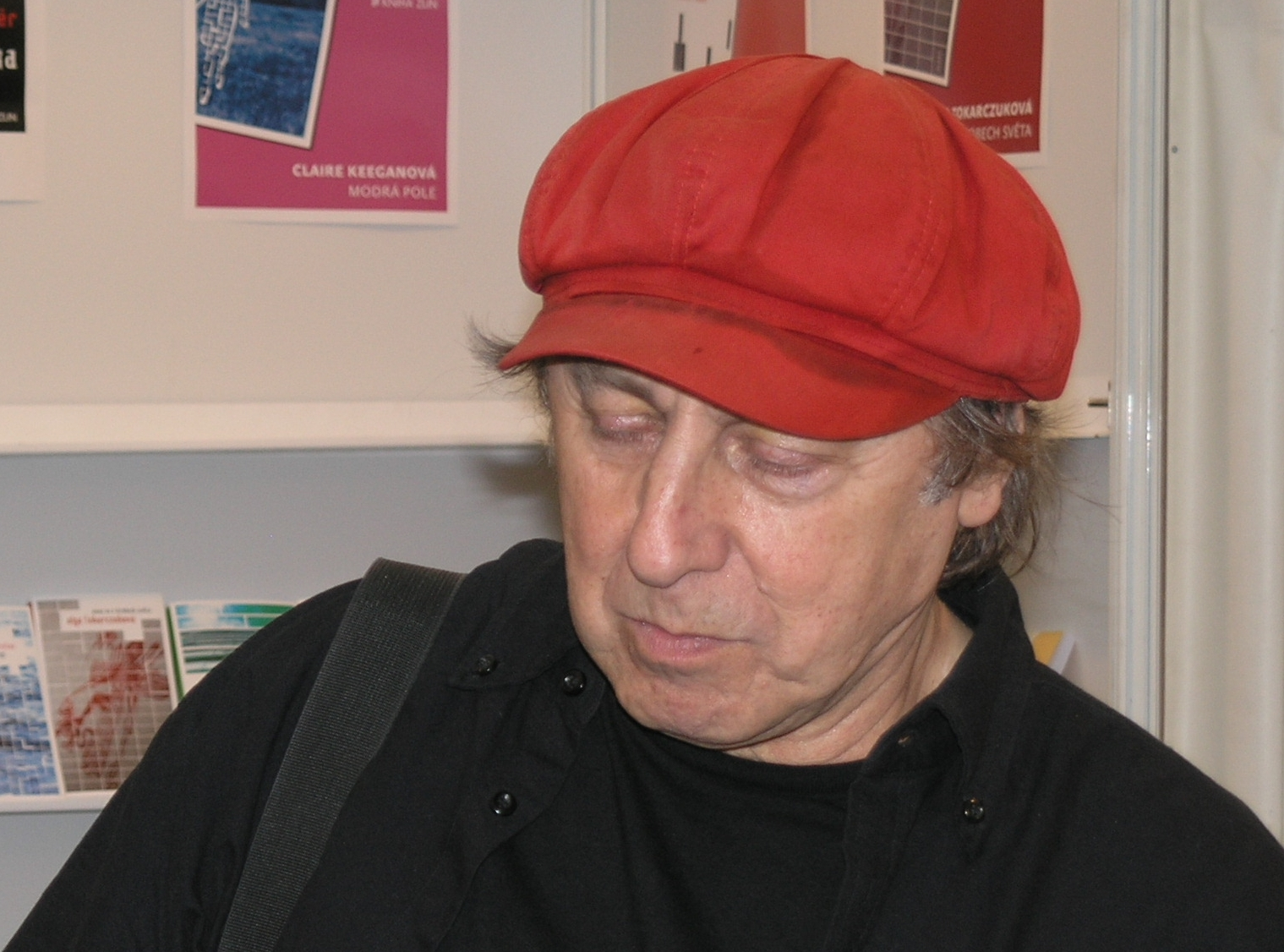
- Born: 5 August 1941; Vyškov, Protectorate of Bohemia and Moravia
- Died: 2 April 2016 (aged 74); Prague, Czech Republic
- Occupation: Actor

Boris Hybner (5 August 1941 – 2 April 2016) was a Czech actor, director and mime artist.

In 2010, Hybner won the Thalia Award.

Hybner died on 2 April 2016 at the age of 74 from an illness.

== Selected filmography ==
List of acting performances in film and television
Year	Title	Role
1983	Jára Cimrman Lying, Sleeping	Professor
1985	Dissolved and Effused	Holohkavý muz
1999	Cosy Dens	Magician
2006	Rafťáci	Therapist
2008	I'm All Good	Skorápkár
2009	Toys in the Attic	Mucha
2015	Marguerite	M. Callot
