= Kingdom of Wallachia =

Micronation in the Czech Republic

Coordinates: 49°32′55.38″N 18°12′32.5″E

Valašské kralovství Kingdom of Wallachia
- Micronation (unrecognized entity)
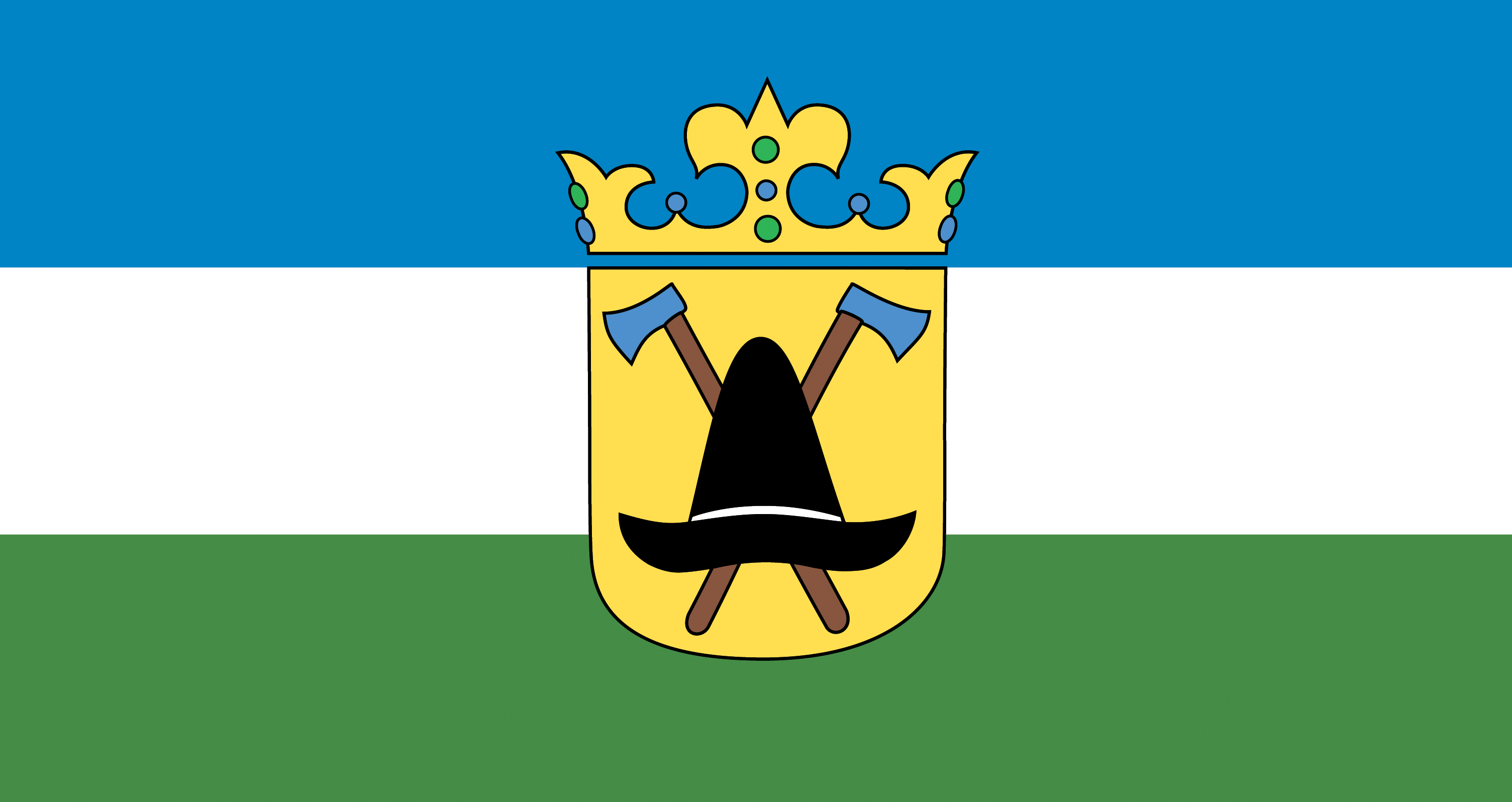
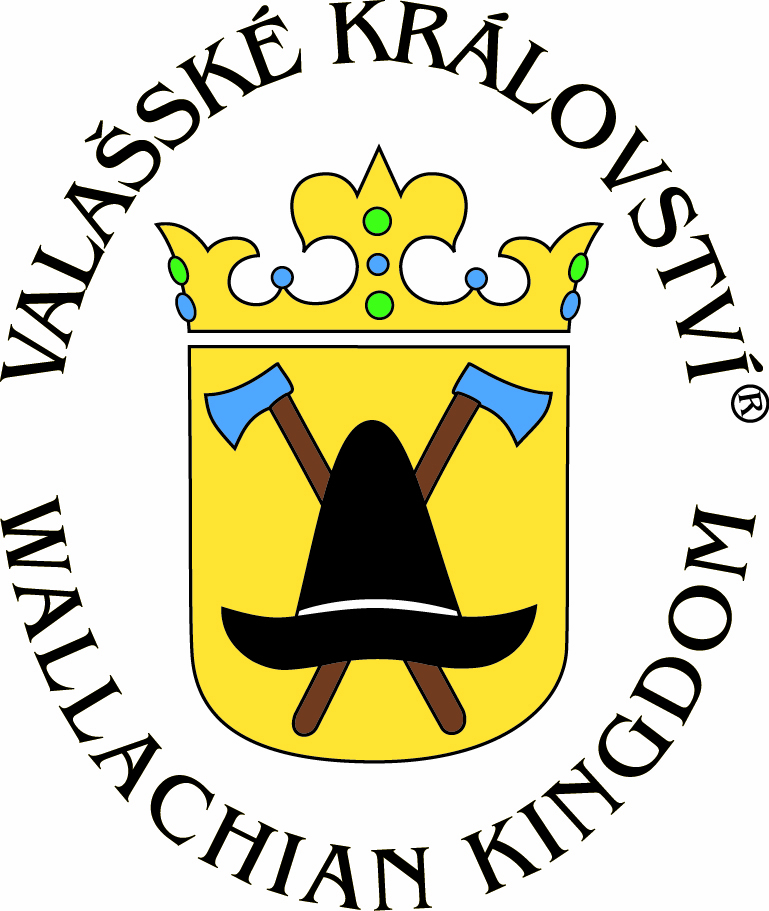
- Flag Coat of arms

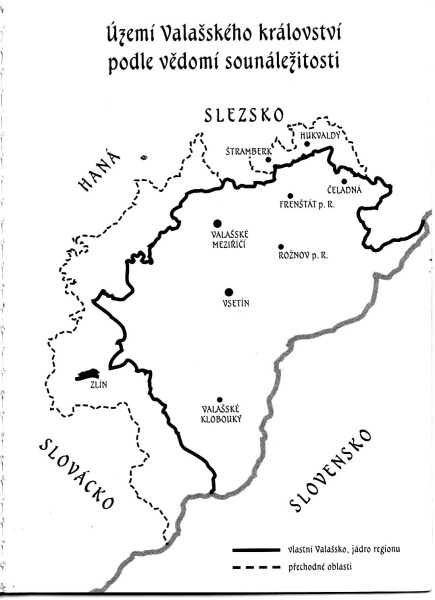
- Location: Moravian Wallachia, Czech Republic
- Claimed by: Tomáš Harabiš, Bolek Polívka
- Dates claimed: 1997, 1993 (disputed)–present

The Kingdom of Wallachia (Czech: Valašské kralovství), named after the region of Moravian Wallachia, is a tongue-in-cheek fictional kingdom and tourism venture that was founded in 1997 by the photographer Tomáš Harabiš as an "elaborate practical joke". The location is in the southeast corner of the Czech Republic. Since foundation a reported 80,000 Czech citizens have acquired "Wallachian Passports".

After the official proclamation of the Wallachian Kingdom in 1997, actor Bolek Polívka was appointed "King Boleslav I" with his coronation occurring at a lavish ceremony in 2000. Polívka was later removed in a "coup" by Harabiš in 2001, and in 2008 Czech courts ruled Polívka was not entitled to profit off of the "kingdom's" trademark. The Kingdom of Wallachia has no formal diplomatic recognition.

== Court case ==
In 2001, the "Wallachian government" revoked the leadership of Bolek Polívka, accusing him of behaving unconstitutionally by demanding 1,000,000 Czech koruna for his services. Polívka then claimed he had actually become king in 1993 through a proclamation he made on a television show, and that "23 of 28 municipalities across the kingdom" still recognized him as king. Unable to settle the dispute internally, the case was taken to court in 2007 in Ostrava, Czech Republic. The court ruled in favour of Tomáš Harabiš, rejecting Polívka's assertion of ownership of the "Kingdom of Wallachia" trademark and barring him from profiting off of it. A tournament to determine the new "king" led to the installation of Vladimír Zháněl as "King Vladimír II".
