= The Teacher (2016 film) =

2016 film by Jan Hřebejk

- Directed by: Jan Hřebejk
- Written by: Petr Jarchovský
- Starring: Zuzana Mauréry; Csongor Kassai; Ladislav Hrušovský; Zuzana Konečná
- Music by: Michal Novinski
- Release date: 4 July 2016 (Karlovy IFF)
- Running time: 102 minutes
- Countries: Slovakia; Czech Republic
- Language: Slovak
- Budget: Kč20 million (≈$678,477)
- Box office: $1.9 million

The Teacher (Slovak: Učiteľka) is a 2016 Slovak-Czech black comedy film directed by Jan Hřebejk which premiered at the 2016 Karlovy Vary International Film Festival, where Zuzana Mauréry received an award for best actress.

== Plot ==
The film is set in 1983, Czechoslovakia. Mária Drazdechová becomes a teacher at a suburban school near Bratislava. She uses her position to blackmail parents of her students to get benefits from them. Students whose parents disobey are bullied and given bad grades. The head teacher is afraid to intervene as Drazdechová is chairperson of the school Communist Party branch. One of Drazdechová's students attempts suicide as a result of the bullying. This induces the school principal to call the parents for a meeting about a petition to remove Drazdechová from the school. There are parents whose children were bullied by Drazdechová and others who support her. Most of the parents are afraid of the teacher's connections and do not want to sign. The meeting ends in failure as only three families sign. It seems that Drazdechová has won, but some families later change their minds and return to sign the petition. This results in Drazdechová being removed from the school.

The film shifts to 1991, two years after the Velvet Revolution. Drazdechová becomes a teacher once again. The movie concludes with the same scene from the beginning — Drazdechová asks all her students about their parents' jobs. The only difference is that on the classroom wall hangs a portrait of Václav Havel instead of Gustáv Husák.

== Cast ==
- Zuzana Mauréry as Mária Drazdechová
- Zuzana Konečná as Kučerová
- Csongor Kassai as Kučera
- Tamara Fischer as Danka Kučerová
- Martin Havelka as Binder
- Éva Bandor as Hana Binderová
- Oliver Oswald as Filip Binder
- Peter Bebjak as Václav Littmann
- Richard Labuda as Karol Littmann
- Dušan Kaprálik as Hančo

== Release ==
=== Box office ===
The Teacher grossed $64,437 in the United States and Canada and $1.9 million in other countries for a worldwide total of $1.9 million.

=== Critical response ===
On review aggregator website Rotten Tomatoes, the film has an approval rating of 91% based on 32 reviews, with an average rating of 7.25/10. Metacritic reports a score of 77 out of 100, based on 8 critics, indicating "generally favorable reviews".
