= Broken Promise (2009 film) =

War drama film by Jiří Chlumský

- Slovak: Nedodržaný sľub
- Directed by: Jiří Chlumský
- Written by: Jan Novák
- Produced by: Peter Palka
- Starring: Samuel Spišák; Ondřej Vetchý; Zuzana Porubjaková
- Cinematography: Ján Ďuriš
- Edited by: Vassilis Skalenakis
- Music by: Michal Novinski
- Distributed by: Gentafilm
- Release date: 30 April 2009
- Running time: 129 minutes
- Countries: Slovakia; Czech Republic; United States
- Languages: Slovak; Russian

Broken Promise (Slovak: Nedodržaný sľub) is a 2009 war drama film directed by Jiří Chlumský and starring Samuel Spišák, Ondřej Vetchý, and Zuzana Porubjaková. The film was Slovakia's submission to the 82nd Academy Awards in the Best Foreign Language Film category. It won the main prize at the 2009 Los Angeles Jewish Film Festival. Broken Promise received nine nominations at the 2010 Sun in a Net Awards but succeeded in winning just one, awarded to Michal Novinski for the film's music.

== Plot ==
Martin Friedmann grows up in a large Jewish family in the Slovak town of Bánovce nad Bebravou. His life is turned upside down with the outbreak of World War II, Slovakia's alignment with the Nazis, and the subsequent persecution of Jews. Motivated by a letter from a friend, he voluntarily goes to the labor camp in Sereď, where he manages to avoid being deported to a death camp due to his ability to play football. One day, he escapes the camp and returns to his hometown, only to discover that his family has been removed.

After returning to the camp, Martin catches pneumonia, and the doctor sends him to a sanatorium. In order not to have to return to the camp, he works as a laborer in a monastery.

With the end of the war approaching, Martin leaves the monastery, contacts the resistance in Poprad, and joins the partisans under the name Martin Petrášek. He actively participates in the Slovak National Uprising, during which he works in Zvolen. After the defeat of the rebellion, he and the other partisans take refuge in the mountains, where they fight and manage to hold out until the end of the war.

In the end, Martin returns to his birthplace, where he finds only memories and family heirlooms. The film concludes with footage of the real Martin Friedmann visiting Slovakia in the late 2000s, standing at the Danube waterfront in Bratislava.

== Cast and characters ==
- Samuel Spišák as Martin Friedmann
- Ondřej Vetchý as Friedmann senior
- Zuzana Porubjaková as Eva

== See also ==
- List of Slovak submissions for the Academy Award for Best Foreign Language Film
- List of submissions to the 82nd Academy Awards for Best Foreign Language Film
