= River Rascals =

- Theatrical release poster
- Czech: Špunti na vodě
- Directed by: Jiří Chlumský
- Written by: Marcel Bystroň
- Produced by: Ludvík Mareček
- Starring: Hynek Čermák, Pavel Liška, Jiří Langmajer
- Cinematography: Pavel Berkovič
- Music by: Ondřej Brousek, Michal Hrůza
- Release date: April 13, 2017
- Running time: 83 minutes
- Country: Czech Republic
- Language: Czech
- Budget: 20 million CZK
- Box office: 41 million CZK

River Rascals (Czech: Špunti na vodě) is a 2017 Czech comedy film directed by Jiří Chlumský. It was inspired by I Enjoy the World with You.

== Plot ==
Václav and Lada plan an anniversary of their wedding. Their guests include sons David and Igor together with their wives. Nephew Ondřej and his girlfriend Zlatica return from America and are invited too. David, Igor and Ondřej plan to go to the celebration by canoes but wives disagree. When incitement party for Ondřej turns out as a catastrophy, women leave men with children.

== 2017 Czech legislative election ==
The Civic Democratic Party used the film during their campaign for the 2017 Czech legislative election. The party organised projections in 90 municipalities across the Czech Republic to attract voters for its meetings. The first projection was held in Mělník on 13 August 2017.
