= Lenka Dolanská Vlasáková =

Czech actress

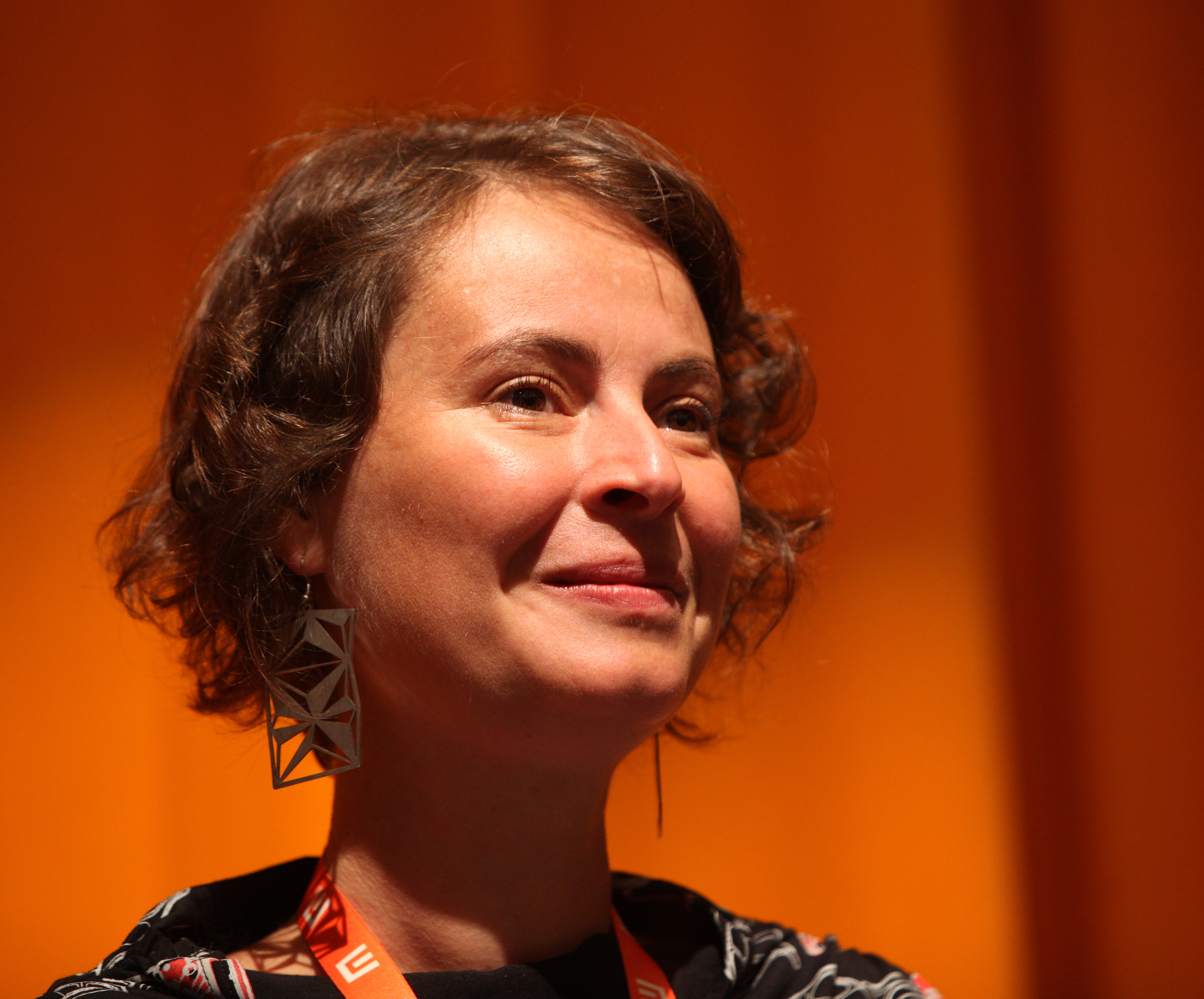
- Lenka Dolanská Vlasáková (2010)
- Born: 27 April 1972 (age 52); Prague, Czechoslovakia
- Occupation: Actress
- Years active: 1990-present
- Spouse: Jan Dolanský (married 2020–present)

Lenka Dolanská Vlasáková (born 27 April 1972, in Prague) is a Czech actress. She played the title role in Lea, released in 1997; Lucie in Kawasaki's Rose, released in 2009; and I'm All Good, released in 2008. She married Jan Dolanský in December 2020 after having three children with him. She also had a daughter from her previous marriage with Egon Tobias.

== Selected filmography ==
- Lea (1997)
- We Are Never Alone (2016)
