= 3 Seasons in Hell =

- Czech Film Poster
- Directed by: Tomáš Mašín
- Written by: Lubomír Drozd; Tomáš Mašín; Egon Bondy
- Produced by: Monika Kristlová; Jasmin Torbati
- Starring: Kryštof Hádek; Karolina Gruszka; Jan Kraus; Martin Huba; Ľuboš Kostelný; Táňa Pauhofová; Miroslav Krobot; Matěj Ruppert
- Cinematography: Karl Oskarsson
- Edited by: Petr Turyna
- Music by: Filip Jelínek
- Release date: 25 November 2009
- Running time: 110 minutes
- Country: Czech Republic
- Language: Czech

3 Seasons in Hell (Czech: 3 sezóny v pekle) is a 2009 Czech film directed by Tomáš Mašín. Set during the Soviet Union's takeover of Czechoslovakia in 1948, it is based on memoirs by Egon Bondy.

== Cast ==
- Krystof Hadek as Ivan Heinz
- Karolina Gruszka as Jana
- Martin Huba as Ivan's Father
- Jan Kraus as Viktor Lukas
- Tomasz Tyndyk as Hanes
- Lubo Kostelny as Karel
- Tatiana Pauhofova as Hana

== Response ==
Ray Bennett praised the performances of Krystof Hadek and Karolina Gruszka, saying that although initially shallow and inconsequential the viewer came to feel deeply involved in them. Variety praised the cinematography and production design while finding the lead character annoying and unsympathetic. What Culture found it balanced and interesting despite flaws, giving it 3/5.
