= Jaroslav Dušek =

Czech actor (born 1961)

- Jaroslav Dušek in 2026
- Born: 30 April 1961 (age 65); Prague, Czechoslovakia
- Occupation: Actor
- Years active: 1980–present

Signature
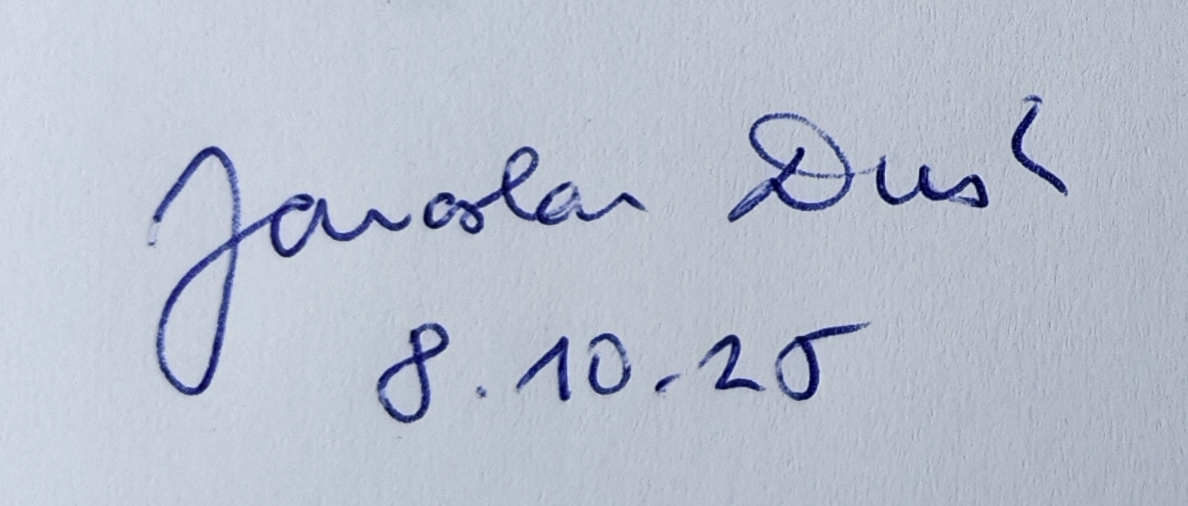

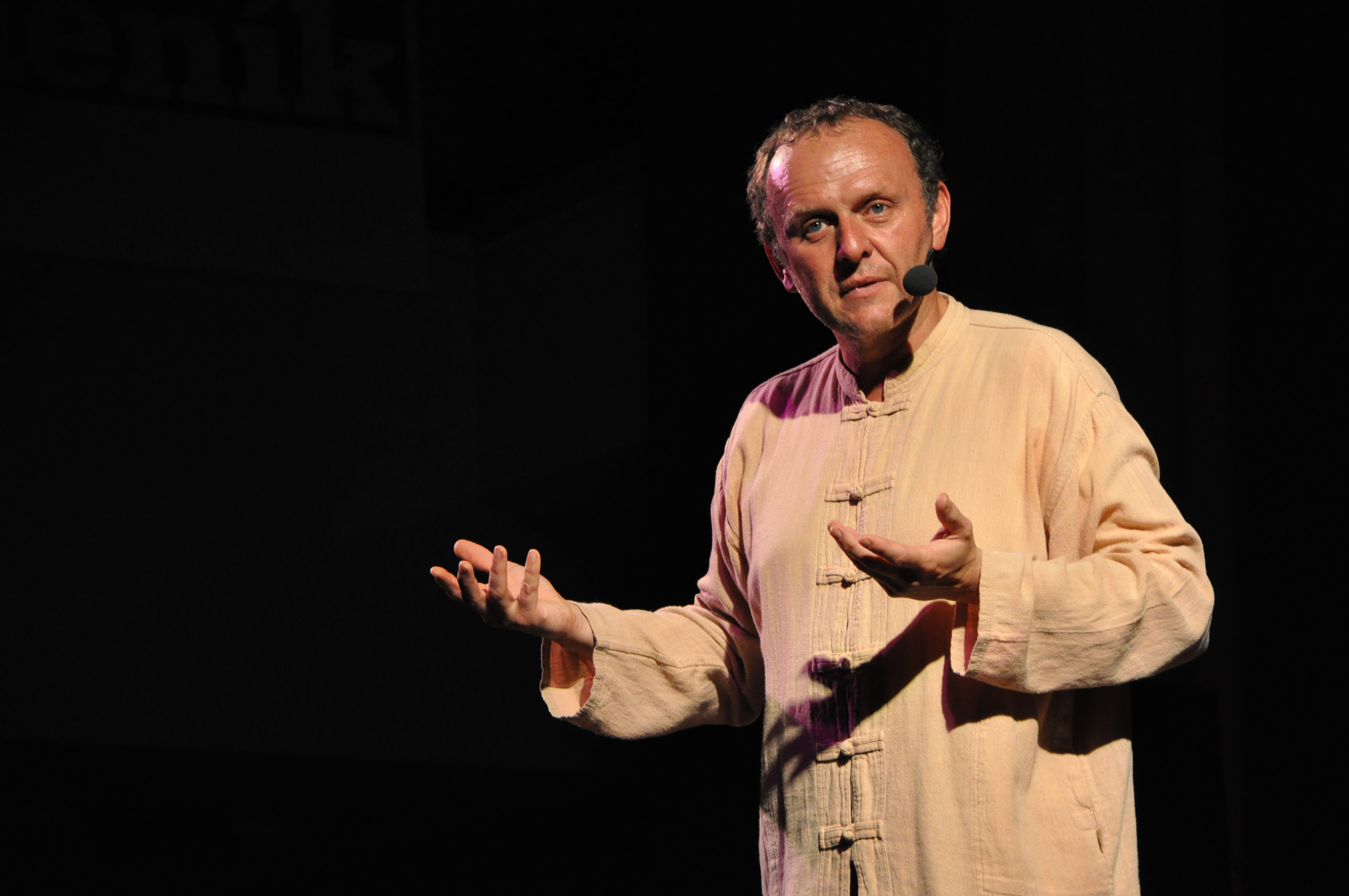
Jaroslav Dušek, play The Four Agreements (2009)

Jaroslav Dušek (born 30 April 1961) is a Czech actor.

== Selected filmography ==
=== Film ===
- Kouř (1991)
- Cosy Dens (1999)
- Divided We Fall (2000)
- Želary (2003)
- Pupendo (2003)
- Mazaný Filip (2003)
- Up and Down (2004)
- Lunacy (2005)
- Zrcadlení tmy (2020)
- Where Butterflies Don't Fly (2022)
- Indián (2022)

=== Television ===
- Dokoláč (2000)
- Wasteland (2016)

=== Play ===
- U výčepu (2010)
