= I'm All Good =

2008 Czech comedy film

I'm All Good (Czech: U mě dobrý) is a 2008 Czech comedy film directed by Jan Hřebejk. Filming locations included the Košíře district of Prague. The film was released on 15 May 2008.

== Cast ==
- Boleslav Polívka – Mrklas alias Mr. Class
- Jiří Schmitzer – Tonda
- Lenka Vlasáková – Andula
- Josef Somr – Balun
- Miroslav Vladyka – Kája
- Vladimír Javorský – Pepé
- Petr Forman – Láďa
- Dalibor Vinklát – Franta
- Simona Babčáková – Jitka, Kája's wife
- Boris Hybner
- Jakub Kohák
