= Ladislav Chudík =

Slovak actor (1924–2015)

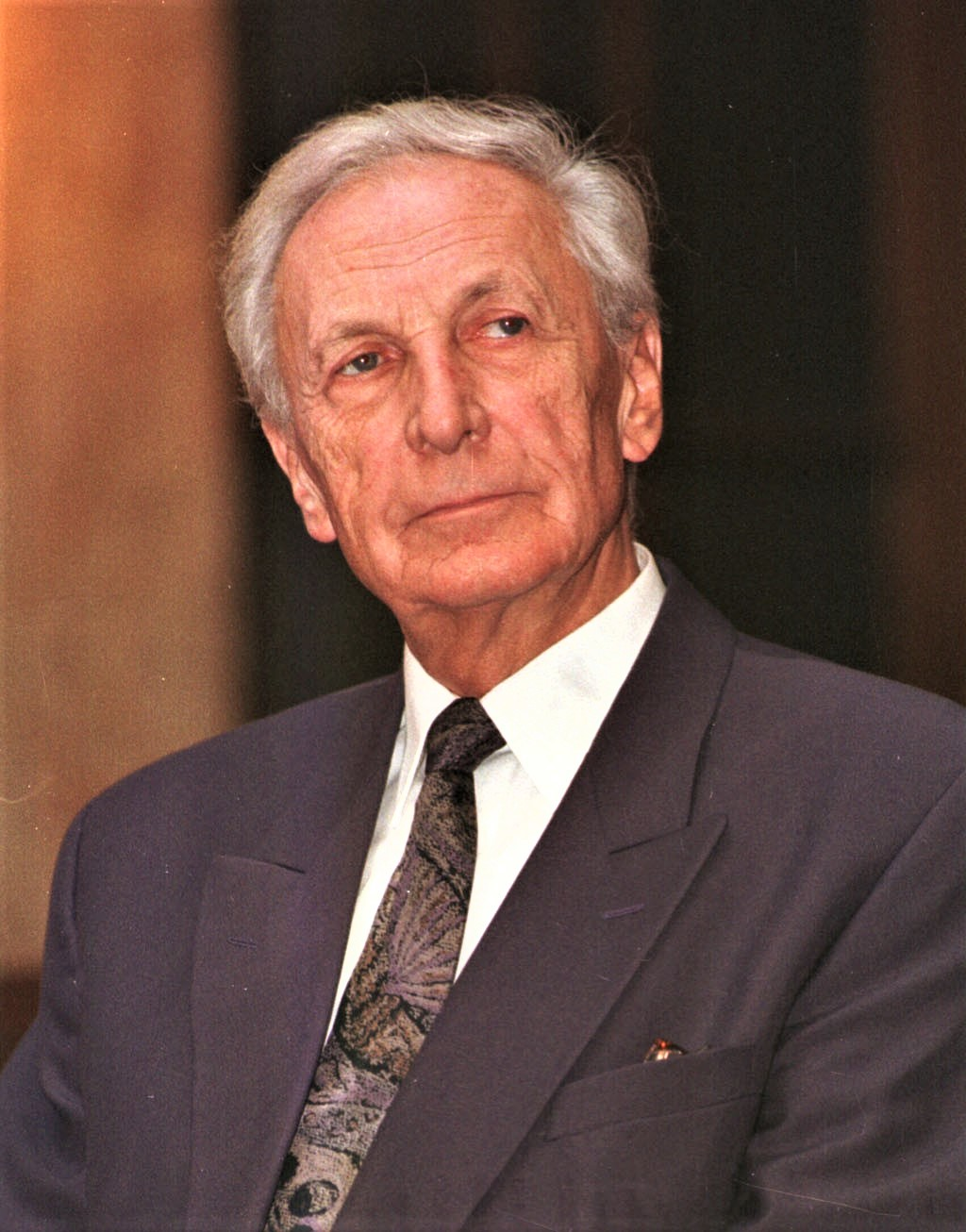
- Born: 27 May 1924; Hronec, Czechoslovakia (now Slovakia)
- Died: 29 June 2015 (aged 91); Bratislava, Slovakia
- Occupation: Actor
- Years active: 1948-2015

Ladislav Chudík (27 May 1924 – 29 June 2015) was a Slovak actor. He appeared in more than fifty films.

== Selected filmography ==
Film
Year	Title	Role	Notes
2009	Kawasaki's Rose		
1985	Forget Mozart		
1961	A Song About the Gray Pigeon		

TV
Year	Title	Role	Notes
1977	Hospital at the End of the City		

== Awards ==
- Czech Lion for Best Supporting Actor (2009)
