= Protector (2009 film) =

- Directed by: Marek Najbrt
- Written by: Robert Geisler; Benjamin Tuček; Marek Najbrt
- Produced by: Milan Kuchynka; Pavel Strnad
- Starring: Jana Plodková; Marek Daniel; Klára Melíšková; Sandra Nováková; Jan Budař; Martin Myšička; Jiří Ornest; Vít Závodský
- Cinematography: Miloslav Holman
- Edited by: Pavel Hrdlička
- Music by: Midi Lidi
- Distributed by: Falcon
- Release date: 24 September 2009
- Running time: 102 minutes
- Country: Czech Republic
- Languages: Czech; German

Protector (Czech: Protektor) is a 2009 Czech film directed by Marek Najbrt. It is a story of Hana and Emil Vrbata, a couple living in German-occupied Czechoslovakia, in the Protectorate of Bohemia and Moravia, during World War II.

The general reception by the Czech press and the audience was extremely positive. It was selected as the Czech Republic's submission for Best Foreign Language Film at the 82nd Academy Awards.

== Plot ==
It is 1938 and the Nazis are just one step away from invading and occupying Czechoslovakia. Hana is a young Czech film actress who also happens to be Jewish. She has just appeared in her first feature with her leading man, an older Jewish actor, who warns her that her career is over. He furthermore tells her that their picture will "never see the light of day" due to the fact that the Nazis will never allow its release. He hands her a forged passport and papers to get out of the country but she throws them in the trash, not believing what he says about the imminent German invasion.

As the filming of the 'film within a film' is on the verge of completion, we see the two actors riding stationery bicycles with a moving image in the background. As was the usual practice in creating films in earlier days, the illusion of motion is created when the moving image flickers in the background but the object in the foreground is static. This cyclist becomes a symbol for the man who pedals furiously but is actually going nowhere. That man is the Czech "every-man" of 1938 who desperately wishes to escape his tragic circumstances but in reality remains motionless, trapped by the forces of tyranny. Throughout the film, we catch glimpses of the film's protagonist, Emil, pedaling furiously, superimposed over the screen's larger canvas.

Hana is married to Emil, a journalist, who is conscripted by collaborating Czech officials at the radio station where he works to serve as a radio announcer after a colleague, Franta, who will not keep his opinions about the Germans to himself, is taken away by occupying forces and later executed. Emil cooperates to protect his wife from being deported to the death camps. Emil's boss at the radio station is a Nazi sympathizer who offers him the job with the understanding that no one will bother him about his wife.

Soon, Emil has become popular hosting a cultural program in Prague entitled "Voices of Our Home". Meanwhile Hana becomes bored sitting at home and jeopardizes Emil's position by leaving their apartment, usually to attend the cinema. As Hana is rebellious and exasperated, she refuses to accept how risky her position is as a Jew in Nazi-occupied Czechoslovakia. She is almost arrested leaving the cinema after curfew, rescued by former medical student, now morphine-addicted projectionist, Petr.

As tensions arise, Emil begins having an affair with former colleague and former lover of Franta, Vera. Vera is now engaged to his boss, after dumping Franta for not being able to "listen." After figuring out Emil is having an affair, Hana begins seeing Petr more and more, as they both begin to take up the dangerous hobby of Petr taking pictures Hana in front of Anti-Jewish shop signs. He wants to go to bed with her but she resists his advances, eventually allowing him, however, to take pictures of her in the nude. At this point in the film, things slow down considerably as Hana is no longer talking to Emil with the conflict between the two principals, grinding to a halt.

Hana's former film co-star shows up at their apartment having just escaped from a death-transport (he never made it out of Czechoslovakia). Emil is horrified that Hana allows him to take a bath in the apartment and throws him out on the street. Enraged at Emil for throwing her ex-colleague out, Hana dons her blond wig and adopts the persona of her character from her movie and crashes Emil's boss's wedding. Emil is on the verge of being fired for his 'transgression' when Reich Protector Heydrich is assassinated by Czech partisans. Nazi soldiers do a house-to-house search and discover Hana is in the apartment. When they realize who Emil is, they take no action against Hana, despite the fact that the soldiers know she is Jewish. Later, the Nazis broadcast a description of a bicycle used by one of the partisans who has killed Heydrich. Emil has another affair with a gossip columnist and takes her family's bicycle back to his apartment and attempts to hide it; this leads Hana to believe that Emil has switched sides and is now helping the partisans.

Now Emil's boss orders him to prove his loyalty by reading a loyalty oath over the airwaves after the Heydrich assassination places all Czech citizens in jeopardy. Meanwhile, Hana has come down to earth after she escapes arrest during the house-to-house search. However, when Emil's second lover comes to Hana for help after she saw Emil get taken away, Hana realizes where the bike is truly from and believes that Emil was never on her side after all. She packs her belongings to go find Petr, ultimately ripping off her wedding ring. Unfortunately, she finds Petr completely under the influence of morphine and watching her first feature film. The Nazis hear the loud music and arrest him, with Hana barely getting away. After she has realized that there is nothing left to live for, she turns herself into the authorities. Emil decides not to show up at the broadcast to read the loyalty oath to go looking for Hana, riding the bike that is believed to belong to the man who assassinated the Reich Protector.

Emil finds her in a crowd of Jews being marched to the death-transports. He stands impassively with the bike blocking the group's path. Nazi soldiers club him in the head and drag him to the side of the road. He runs to meet Hana in the crowd and they gaze at each other. Emil is then attacked for a second time as Hana is marched away.

== Reception ==
Rotten Tomatoes gives the film a critic score of 63% based on 8 reviews with an average rating of 5.5.

=== Awards and nominations ===
- Krzysztof Kieslowski Award for best feature film at Starz Denver Film Festival 2009
