= Bolek Polívka =

Czech actor and playwright (born 1949)

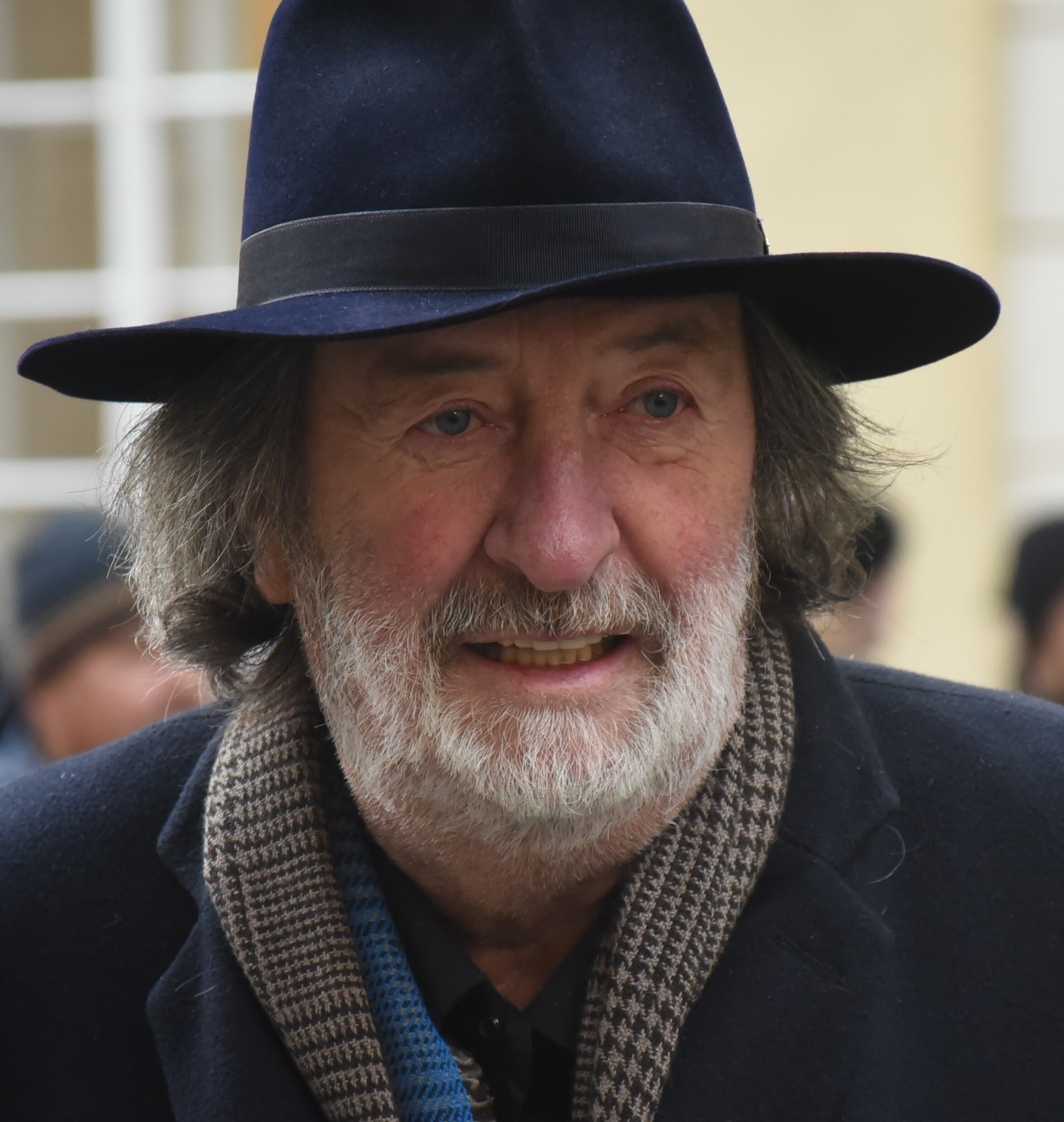
- Polívka in 2023
- Born: 31 July 1949 (age 77); Vizovice, Czechoslovakia
- Occupations: Actor; mime; playwright; screenwriter
- Years active: 1967–present
- Spouse: Stanislava Polívková (divorced); Chantal Poullain (divorced): Marcela Černá (m. 2020)

Boleslav Polívka (born 31 July 1949, in Vizovice) is a Czech film and theatre actor, mime, playwright, and screenwriter. He has appeared in more than 40 films.

== Career ==
Polívka first started appearing in films in the 1960s. He graduated from the Janáček Academy of Music and Performing Arts in Brno in 1971, in the play Podivné odpoledne dr. Zvonka Burkeho ("The Strange Afternoon of Dr. Zvonek Burke") by Ladislav Smoček. In 1969 he co-founded Divadlo Husa na provázku (Goose on a String Theatre) in Brno, and founded his own theatre in the same city, Divadlo Bolka Polívky (Bolek Polívka Theatre), in 1993. He is one of the best-known exponents of Czech mime and frequently appears with foreign theatre ensembles.

Polívka's work as writer, director and mime artist is inspired by clown comedy, Commedia dell'arte, and early comedy films, but he occasionally introduces voice and words into his performances, thereby crossing over into a form of "total acting".

Polívka worked with the Czech director Vladimír Sís until the latter's death in 2001. He also regularly collaborated with Věra Chytilová from the 1980s until her death in 2014, starring in the lead role in several of her "moralistic comedies".

In 1997 he was awarded the Czech Lion and voted Best Actor at the Karlovy Vary International Film Festival for his performance as the priest Holý in Forgotten Light (Czech: Zapomenuté světlo). Polívka received a second Czech Lion for his role in the 2000 film Divided We Fall (Czech: Musíme si pomáhat) by Jan Hřebejk. The film was also nominated for the Academy Award for Best Foreign Language Film.

Polívka also presents two television shows, Manéž Bolka Polívky ("Bolek Polívka's Arena") and Bolkoviny, both for Czech Television.

== Personal life ==
He has been married three times and has six children, including actress Anna Polívková.

=== Legal disputes ===
Polívka used to organize public events and entertainments at his farm in Olšany near Brno, but in 2013, his company went bust and the farm closed, with creditors suing him for CZK 56 million.

Polívka was involved in what BBC News described as one of the oddest legal disputes of the Czech Republic's history. In a 1993 TV performance he had himself crowned as "king" of the fictional Kingdom of Wallachia (named after Moravian Wallachia). In 1997 he began a collaboration with Tomáš Harabiš, who had independently created and officially registered a separate fictional "Wallachian Kingdom", complete with "passports". Polívka, as a well-known actor, became the public face of the "Wallachian Kingdom" as "Wallachian King, Boleslav I the Gracious, Forever", and Harabiš and Polívka's partnership made the "Wallachian Kingdom" one of the most successful tourist attractions in the Czech Republic. Their working relationship continued amicably until 2000, when a dispute erupted over legal ownership of the "kingdom", as the kingdom's name had been trademarked by Harabiš. In 2001 Harabiš deposed "King Boleslav", but in 2002 Polívka retaliated with a lawsuit, which accused Harabiš of making unlawful profits from Polívka as "King Boleslav". In 2008 Polívka lost the case.

== Selected plays ==
- Am a Ea (Am and Ea)
- Pezza versus Čorba
- Pépe
- Trosečník (Castaway)
- Poslední leč
- Šašek a královna (The Jester and the Queen)

== Selected filmography ==
- Balada pro Banditu (1978)
- Kalamita (Calamity) (1981)
- Poslední leč (1981)
- Šašek a královna (1987)
- Něžný Barbar (1989)
- Sedím na konári a je mi dobre (1989)
- Dědictví aneb Kurvahošigutntag (1992)
- Forgotten Light (Czech: Zapomenuté světlo; 1996)
- Suzanne (1996)
- Pelíšky (Cozy Dens) (1999)
- Divided We Fall (Czech: Musíme si pomáhat; 2000)
- Out of the City (2000)
- Pupendo
- Something Like Happiness (Czech: Štěstí; 2005)
- Roming (2007)
- Bathory (2008)
- Men in Hope (2011)
- The Magical Duvet (2011)
- Revival (2013)
- Home Care (2015)

== Bibliography ==
- Fikejz, Miloš (2007). Český film. Herci a herečky / II. díl (L-Ř) (in Czech). Prague: Libri. pp. 458–460. ISBN 978-80-7277-334-3.
