= Jiří Chlumský =

Czech director (born 1958)

- Born: 4 July 1958 (age 67); Prague, Czechoslovakia
- Occupation: Film director
- Spouse: Šárka Oujezdská

Jiří Chlumský (born 4 July 1958) is a Czech director. His 2009 film Broken Promise was Slovakia's submission to the 82nd Academy Awards for the Academy Award for Best Foreign Language Film. Chlumský is married to Czech producer Šárku Oujezdskou.

== Selected filmography ==
- Konečná stanica (2004)
- Prachy dělaj člověka (2006)
- Broken Promise (2009)
- Seven Days of Sin (2012)
- River Rascals (2017)
