= Divided We Fall (film) =

2000 Czech film

- Directed by: Jan Hřebejk
- Written by: Jan Hřebejk; Petr Jarchovský
- Produced by: Pavel Borovan; Ondřej Trojan
- Starring: Bolek Polívka; Anna Šišková; Csongor Kassai
- Cinematography: Jan Malír
- Edited by: Vladimír Barák
- Music by: Ales Brezina
- Release dates: 16 March 2000 (Czech Republic); 8 June 2001 (United States); 31 May 2002 (United Kingdom)
- Running time: 123 minutes
- Country: Czech Republic
- Languages: Czech; German
- Box office: $1,830,938 (worldwide)

Divided We Fall (Czech: Musíme si pomáhat literally translated as We Must Help Each Other) is a 2000 Czech film directed by Jan Hřebejk. It was nominated for the Academy Award for Best Foreign Language Film. Anna Šišková won a Lion award for best actress.

== Plot ==
The film opens in 1939 Czechoslovakia. Horst, a Czech-German Nazi collaborator married to a German woman and co-worker of Josef, brings food to Josef and his wife Marie, who are Czechs. Josef hates the Nazis. When Josef finds David, who had escaped a concentration camp in occupied Poland after first being sent to the Theresienstadt Ghetto in northern Bohemia, Josef and Marie decide to hide him in their apartment. Horst makes an unannounced visit, bringing presents as usual. Marie is ambivalent about their secret: On one hand she never misses an opportunity to blame her husband for bringing in the Jew, but on the other she is merciful and sympathetic towards the poor kid locked in the closet day and night. She suggests that Josef accept Horst's job offer evicting Czech Jews from their homes, so as to get more protection and deflect possible suspicions. Josef accepts and is considered a collaborator by the neighbor Franta (who had tried to give David over to the Nazi authorities, when he first escaped from a concentration camp). Marie spends the days learning French from David and getting more and more tender toward him. Horst's visits become more frequent, and one afternoon, he attempts to rape Marie.

Josef gets his fertility tested to confirm a long-time rumor: He can't have children. Humiliated by his earlier antics, Horst takes revenge on Marie by forcing them to provide lodging for his supervisor, a committed Nazi bureaucrat, who had suffered a stroke after Nazis killed his son for deserting the army. Marie refuses to accept him on the grounds that she is pregnant. Unfortunately, the community is well-aware that Josef and Marie are infertile, and Josef proposes that David get Marie pregnant in order to stage a "miracle" and avoid further investigation. After much resistance from Marie, she and David have sex. Marie becomes pregnant, and Horst eventually apologizes for his previous behavior. As the Germans lose ground in World War II, Horst's behavior begins to change. Based on his previous suspicions that someone else is living with Josef and Marie, he redirects German authorities when the latter search the street house by house. Finally, the Germans are defeated and the Czech people take brutal revenge on them. As the Germans are being driven out, Marie goes into labor. Josef frantically searches for a doctor, but the streets of the city are in chaos and the Nazi-affiliated doctor has already been captured.

Josef finally finds the new ruling troika which includes his old neighbor Franta as the representative of the Czech Resistance. Unfortunately, Franta remembers him as a collaborator and orders his arrest. Josef protests his innocence and invites them to meet David as proof of his ambivalence towards the Jews, in exchange for a chance to find the Nazi doctor to deliver Marie's baby. In the jails, Josef finds that the doctor has committed suicide but also finds Horst crouched in a corner. Remembering Horst's previous actions that saved David's life, Josef tells the Czech partisan guards that Horst is his doctor. The partisans escort them to Josef's house, driving through the ruins of the city. (Note: Hřebejk elected to film Josef's domestic scenes at Ettrichova Vila in Jaroměř, Czech Republic, designed in 1873 by František Plesnivý, which during the late 19th century is known to have been frequented by Emperor Franz Joseph I.) Horst is able to quickly assume the role of Marie's doctor due to his experience delivering his own sons, much to Marie's initial horror. The partisans still want to see David in order to prove Josef's allegiance, but in the chaos and gunfire, David had hid himself elsewhere. The captain of the partisan unit, a member of the regular Czechoslovak Army, does not believe Josef's story and is about to shoot him, but David shows up at the last minute after Josef's despairing plea: "Let us be human!" After they all return to the household, Marie and David's son is born. The partisans interrogate David about Horst's background, but David, realizing that Horst had known about the situation for over two years and had not reported it, supports Josef's claim that Horst is a doctor and thus saves Horst's life as well.

Days later, Josef walks the baby through the devastated streets of his city. In the ruins, he imagines David's deceased family and his supervisor's youngest son sitting around a small table, waving at him. Josef picks up David's son and waves his hand back. An aria from J.S. Bach's St Matthew Passion (Erbarme dich, mein Gott, God, please have mercy on our frailty!) is the denouement of the film.

== Cast ==
- Bolek Polívka - Josef Čížek
- Anna Šišková - Marie Čížková
- Csongor Kassai - David Wiener
- Jaroslav Dušek - Horst Prohaska
- Martin Huba - Dr. Albrecht Kepke
- Jiří Pecha - František Šimáček
- Simona Stašová - Libuše Šimáčková
- Vladimír Marek - SS Officer
- Richard Tesařík - Captain
- Karel Heřmánek - Captain

== Reception ==
=== Critical response ===
Divided We Fall has an approval rating of 90% on review aggregator website Rotten Tomatoes, based on 62 reviews, and an average rating of 7.29/10. The website's critical consensus states, "Divided We Fall takes a complex look at World War II, skillfully balancing humor and gravity". Metacritic assigned the film a weighted average score of 69 out of 100, based on 23 critics, indicating "generally favorable reviews".

== Themes ==
Throughout the film, none of the principal characters is shown to be purely good or purely bad. Josef has had to collaborate with the Nazis to provide additional cover while hiding a Jew in his home; Horst has been a pro-German collaborator, but has also kept his old friend's secret, Marie has had to compromise herself for the sake of their safety, and even the anti-Nazi partisan Franta, now in a position of authority, had at one time tried to turn David over to the Germans. But by film's end the war is over and it is time to work toward reconciliation and rebuilding. Thus, while ostensibly about the Nazi occupation and its aftermath, "Divided We Fall" carried a similar message of reconciliation for the contemporary Czech Republic in the aftermath of Soviet occupation and domination.

The imagery of the film is not even thinly disguised: Josef and Marie have a child that is savior (both for them and Horst), but Josef is not the father. It is a child of David. The birth is even attended by three "wise men": a Czech, a German, and a Russian.

== See also ==
- List of submissions to the 73rd Academy Awards for Best Foreign Language Film
- List of Czech submissions for the Academy Award for Best Foreign Language Film
