= Innocence (2011 film) =

2011 Czech drama film

- Film poster
- Czech: Nevinnost
- Directed by: Jan Hřebejk
- Screenplay by: Petr Jarchovský
- Story by: Jan Hřebejk
- Produced by: Rudolf Biermann; Tomáš Hoffman
- Starring: Anna Geislerová; Ondřej Vetchý; Hynek Čermák; Zita Morávková; Anna Linhartová; Luděk Munzar
- Cinematography: Martin Šácha
- Edited by: Vladimír Barák
- Music by: Vladivojna La Chia
- Distributed by: Bontonfilm
- Release date: January 2011
- Running time: 98 minutes
- Country: Czech Republic
- Language: Czech
- Budget: 18,000,000 CZK
- Box office: 18,370,001 CZK

Innocence (Czech: Nevinnost) is a 2011 Czech drama film directed by Jan Hřebejk.

Along with Kawasaki's Rose and Honeymoon, Innocence is part of Hrebejk's loose trilogy of films in which shadows from the past already came to haunt the present of its characters.

== Cast ==
- Anna Geislerová as Lída
- Ondřej Vetchý as Tomáš
- Hynek Čermák as Láďa
- Zita Morávková as Milada
- Anna Linhartová as Olinka
- Luděk Munzar as Mr. Walter
- Miroslav Hanuš as Petr
- Daniel Czeizel as Štěpán
- Alena Mihulová as Kamila
- Rebeka Lizlerová as Tereza
- Věra Hlaváčková as Zdravotnf sestra
- Jiří Šesták as Sexuolog

== Awards ==
Innocence picked up two awards at the 2011 Czech Film Critics' Awards, with recognition going to Anna Geislerová for Best Actress and Hynek Čermák for Best Supporting Actor. The film received nine nominations at the subsequent 2011 Czech Lion Awards, including Best Film, Best Director, Best Leading Actress, Best Supporting Actress, Best Supporting Actor, Best Screenplay, Best Editing, Best Music and Best Poster. Of these, two awards were won: Anna Geislerová for Best Actress and Hynek Čermák for Best Supporting Actor.
