= Teddy Bear (2007 film) =

Czech comedy film

Teddy Bear (Czech: Medvídek) is a 2007 Czech comedy film directed by Jan Hřebejk. It was released on 6 September 2007 and starred Ivan Trojan, Jiří Macháček, Roman Luknár, Nataša Burger, Táňa Vilhelmová, Anna Geislerová and Klára Issová.
