= Ladislav Smoček =

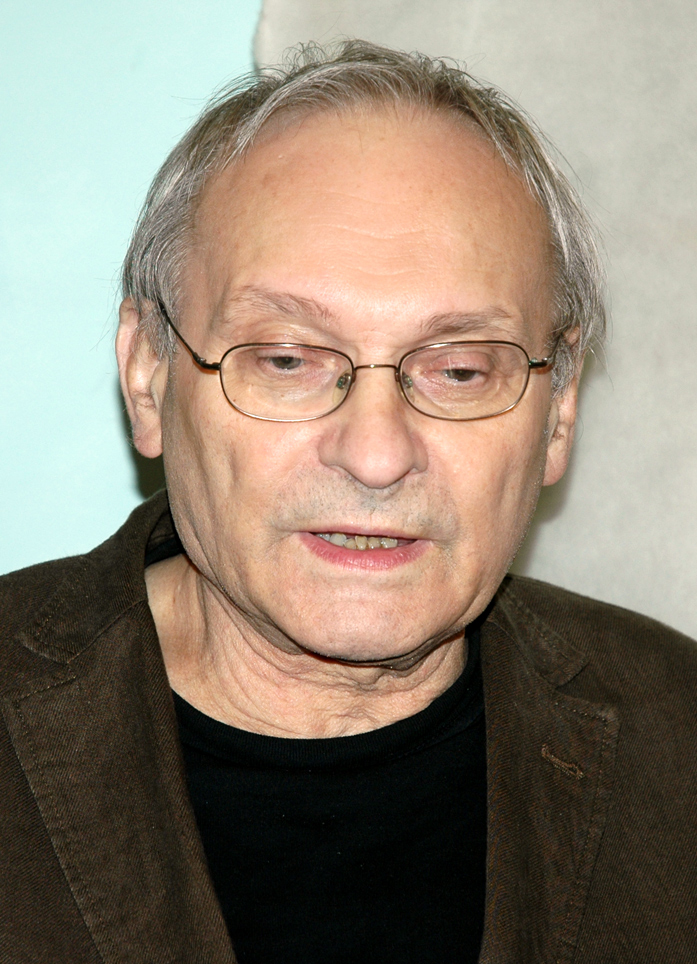
- Born: 24 August 1932 (age 94); Prague, Czechoslovakia
- Occupations: Theatre director, playwright, writer

Ladislav Smoček (born 24 August 1932) is a Czech writer, playwright and theatre director.

== Biography ==
Ladislav Smoček was born on 24 August 1932, in Prague, Czechoslovakia. He comes from a family with a military tradition. His father was an officer in the Czechoslovak Army. After studying at a secondary school in Plzeň, he graduated as a theatre director from the Theatre Faculty of the Academy of Performing Arts in Prague (DAMU) in 1956. His schoolmate there was Václav Hudeček and one of his professors was for also František Salzer.

He started his career in The City Theatre in Benešov (1956–1957), then he was active in Brno (1957–1960) and in 1960 got a place as a director in Laterna magika in Prague. And after few more years he decided to move to the National theatre company where he in 1965 co-founded The Drama Club (Činoherní klub), where he remains employed as a playwright and director until the present.

In the period between 1992 – 1993 he was a director of the Vinohrady Theatre and he acted there as a director on a few occasions since that time. Though he wrote less than ten plays, he is together with Václav Havel and Pavel Kohout one of the most performed Czech playwrights.

== Plays ==
- Piknik (1965) (opening performance of The Drama Club /DC/)
- Dr. Burke's Strange Afternoon (1966) (translated into fourteen languages)
- The Maze (1966) (one act)
- Bitva na Kopci (?) (one act)
- Cosmic Spring (1970)
- The Noose (1972) (written in English)
- Nejlepší den (1995) (the only play performed in Plzeň instead of DC)

== Selected performances – director ==
- 2006 – Les Liaisons dangereuses by Christopher Hampton, DC
- 2005 – Me and Jezebel by Elizabeth Fuller, Divadlo Ungelt
- 2004 – The Businessman from Smyrna by Carlo Goldoni, DC
- 2003 – Driving Miss Daisy by Alfred Uhry, Divadlo Ungelt
- 2002 – Mask and The Face by Luigi Chiarelli, DC
- 2001 – Deskový statek by Václav Štech, DC
- 1999 – Marriage Play by Edward Albee, Divadlo Ungelt
- 1997 – Wild Spring by Arnold Wesker, Divadlo Ungelt
- 1994 – Vodní družstvo by Josef Štolba, DC

== Awards ==
- 2006 The prize of The Ministry of Culture of the Czech Republic
- 2007 Laureate of the Karel Čapek of the Czech Centre of the International PEN club
- 2026 Medal of Merit
