= Marek Daniel =

Czech actor

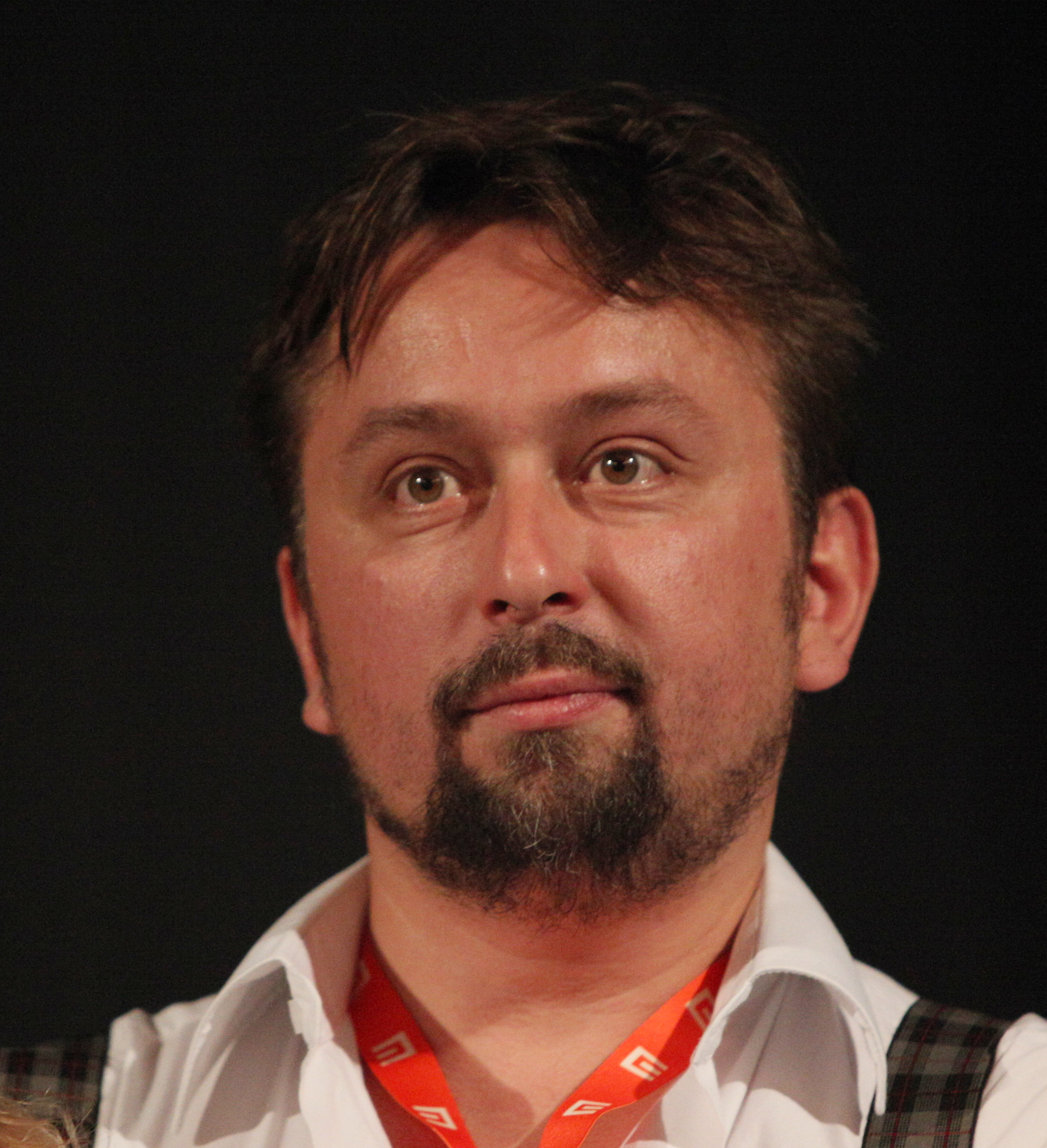
- Marek Daniel at 2010 KVIFF
- Born: 13 September 1971 (age 54); Prague, Czechoslovakia
- Occupation: Actor
- Years active: 1996–present
- Children: 2

Marek Daniel (born 13 September 1971) is a Czech actor. He appeared in more than 20 films since 1996 and had lead roles in Protector and Prezident Blaník.

== Selected filmography ==
Year	Title	Role	Notes
2001	The Wild Bees		
2003	Boredom in Brno		
2004	Up and Down		
2005	Something Like Happiness		
2008	The Country Teacher		
2008	Protector		
2017	Ice Mother		
2018	Prezident Blaník	Tonda Blaník	
