= Pupendo =

2003 Czech comedy drama film

- Directed by: Jan Hřebejk
- Screenplay by: Petr Jarchovský
- Produced by: Ondřej Trojan
- Starring: Bolek Polívka; Eva Holubová
- Cinematography: Jan Malíř
- Edited by: Vladimír Barák
- Distributed by: Falcon
- Release date: 27 March 2003
- Running time: 120 minutes
- Country: Czech Republic
- Language: Czech
- Budget: 25 million CZK
- Box office: 87 million CZK

Pupendo is a 2003 Czech comedy drama film directed by Jan Hřebejk.

== Plot ==
Pupendo shows the difficulty of life in Czechoslovakia during the 1980s. Artist Bedřich Mára (Bolek Polivka) is unable to find much secure work due to his public antagonism toward the ruling Communist Party. He has a wife and two children. Life begins to change when art historian Alois Fábera (Jiři Pecha) begins working on a piece about Bedřich, leading to a job offer from a Party official. Things are looking up, until the wrong people hear portions of the historian's writing.

== Cast ==
- Bolek Polívka - Bedřich Mára
- Eva Holubová - Alena Márová
- Jaroslav Dušek - Míla Břečka
- Jiří Pecha - Alois Fábera
- Vilma Cibulková - Magda Břečková
- Lukáš Baborský - Matěj Mára
- Pavel Liška - Vláďa Ptáčník
