= Petr Šabach =

Czech writer (1951–2017)

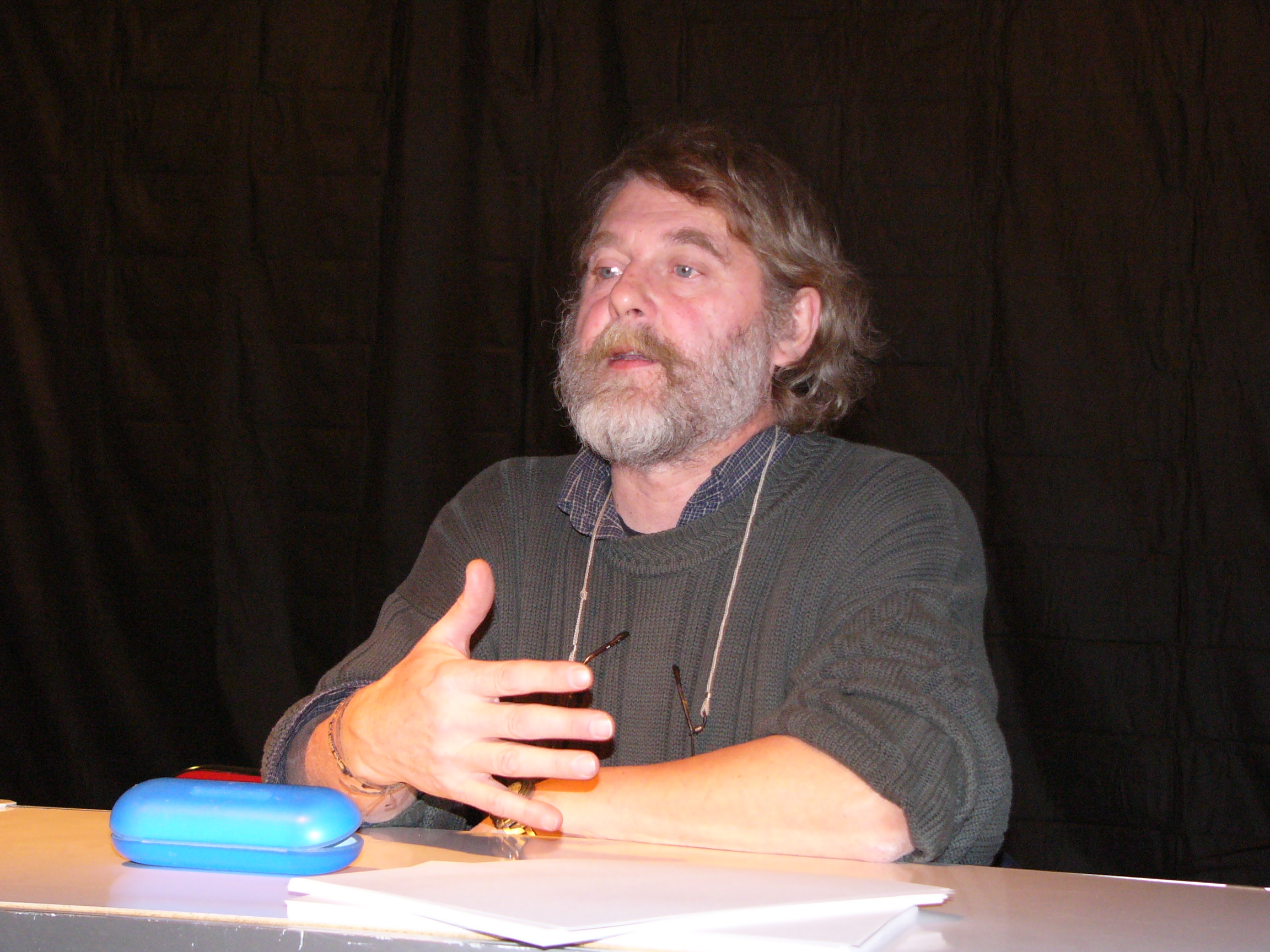
- Šabach in 2007
- Born: 23 August 1951; Prague, Czechoslovakia
- Died: 16 September 2017 (aged 66); Prague, Czech Republic
- Education: Culturology
- Alma mater: Charles University
- Occupation: Writer
- Children: 2
- Writing career
- Notable works: Šakalí léta Hovno hoří Babičky; Opilé banány Putování mořského koně Občanský průkaz

Petr Šabach (August 23, 1951 – September 16, 2017) was a Czech writer.

== Works ==
- Jak potopit Austrálii (1986)
- Hovno hoří (1994)
- Zvláštní problém Františka S. (1996)
- Putování mořského koně (1998)
- Babičky (1998)
- Opilé banány (2001)
- Čtyři muži na vodě (2003)
- Ramon (2004)
- Občanský průkaz (2006)
- Tři vánoční povídky (2007)
- Škoda lásky (2009)
