= Jan Hřebejk =

Czech theater and film director (born 1967)

- Hřebejk in 2023
- Born: 27 June 1967 (age 59); Prague, Czechoslovakia
- Education: Film and TV School of the Academy of Performing Arts in Prague
- Occupations: Film director; actor
- Years active: 1988–present
- Notable work: Big Beat; Cosy Dens; Divided We Fall; Kawasaki's Rose
- Awards: Czech Lion Award – Best Director (Big Beat)

Jan Hřebejk (Czech pronunciation: [ˈjan ˈɦr̝ɛbɛjk]; born 27 June 1967) is a Czech film director and actor. His films are known for their reflection on Czech history, family life, and morality.

== Life and career ==
Born in Prague, Hřebejk graduated from high school in 1987 and continued his studies at the Film and TV School of the Academy of Performing Arts in Prague (FAMU) from 1987 to 1991, majoring in screenplay and dramaturgy. He was at FAMU alongside Petr Jarchovský, who is also his classmate from high school and subsequently a frequent collaborator as a screenwriter.

While at FAMU, Hřebejk directed and produced two short films, Co všechno chcete vědět o sexu a bojíte se to prožít (1988) and L. P. 1948 (1989), from scripts written by his classmate Petr Zelenka. His professional directorial debut was a short film for Czech TV, Nedělejte nic, pokud k tomu nemáte vážný důvod (1991), also written by Zelenka. His films caught the attention of viewers and critics, and entered student film festivals.

Also while still at FAMU, Hřebejk and Jarchovský wrote a comedy screenplay inspired by Hřebejk's background at a summer camp, entitled Pejme písen dohola. This screenplay was filmed in 1990 as a full-length feature by director Ondřej Trojan. In 1992, Hřebejk filmed a version of his FAMU graduate thesis, an interpretation of Egon Hostovský's Dobrocinny vecírek.

This was followed by Big Beat, a rock and roll comedy set in the 1950s and Hřebejk's first major box office success. The film was written by Jarchovský, based on a story by Petr Šabach, and won four Czech Lion awards, including Best Film and Best Director for Hřebejk. In 1996, Hřebejk directed a children's TV series, Kde padají hvezdy, which was syndicated around Europe. The following year, Hřebejk and Jarchovský won awards from the Film and Television Association and the Literary Fund for their contribution to dramatic television programming, for three episodes they wrote for the TV series Bachelors.

The writing and production team behind Big Beat subsequently reunited for two further films, Cosy Dens (Czech: Pelíšky; 1999) and Divided We Fall (Czech: Musíme si pomáhat; 2000), both of which became enormously successful within the Czech Republic.

His 2009 film, Kawasaki's Rose, was selected as the Czech entry for the Best Foreign Language Film at the 83rd Academy Awards, but didn't make the final shortlist.

== Filmography ==
=== Director ===
Cinema

- Co všechno chcete vědět o sexu a bojíte se to prožít (1988) – student movie
- L.P. 1948 (1989) – short movie
- Nedělejte nic, pokud k tomu nemáte vážný důvod (1991) – short movie
- Big Beat (Šakalí léta, 1993)
- Cosy Dens (Pelíšky, 1999)
- Divided We Fall (Musíme si pomáhat, 2000) – 73rd Academy Awards nomination
- Pupendo (2003)
- Up and Down (Horem pádem, 2004)
- Beauty in Trouble (Kráska v nesnázích, 2006)
- Teddy Bear (Medvídek, 2007)
- I'm All Good (U mě dobrý, 2008)
- Shameless (Nestyda, 2008)
- Kawasaki's Rose (Kawasakiho růže, 2009)
- Innocence (Nevinnost, 2011)
- The Holy Quaternity (Svatá Čtveřice, 2012)
- Honeymoon (Líbánky, 2013)
- Zakázané uvolnění (2014)
- The Teacher (Učitelka, 2016)
- Garden Store: A Family Friend (Zahradnictví: Rodinný přítel, 2017)
- Garden Store: Suitor (Zahradnictví: Nápadník, 2017)
- Garden Store: Deserter (Zahradnictví: Dezertér, 2017)
- State of Emergency (Výjimečný stav, 2024)

Television

- The Charity Ball ("Dobročinný večírek", 1992)
- Czech Soda ("Česká soda", 1993–97) – TV-series
- GEN: The Gallery of the Nation's Elite ("GEN: Galerie elity národa", 1993–94) – documentary
  - Vladimír Jiránek by Jan Hřebejk ("Vladimír Jiránek pohledem Jana Hřebejka")
- GENUS ("GENUS", 1995–96) – documentary
  - Michal Viewegh by Jan Hřebejk
  - Vladimír Mišík by Jan Hřebejk
  - Dominik Hašek by Jan Hřebejk
- 60 ("60", 1996) – documentary
- How's the Living ("Jak se žije", 1997) – short documentary TV-series
- Where Stars Fall ("Kde padají hvězdy", 1996) – TV series
- The Last Concert ("Poslední koncert", 1997)
- The Window ("Okno", 1997) – short
- The Good News ("Dobrá zpráva", 1997)
- Pozadí událostí (2022) – TV miniseries

Opera

- Tomorrow There Will Be... ("Zítra se bude...", 2010)

=== Actor ===
- Co všechno chcete vědět o sexu a bojíte se to prožít (1988) – student movie
- Šeptej (1996) as Woody
- Year of the Devil ("Rok ďábla", 1996)
- Úžasný rokenrol v Čechách aneb Jeď, Honzo, jeď (2002) as himself
- Operace Hokejdo (2004) as himself
- Největší z Čechů (2010) as chair of the grant committee
- Rozmarná léta českého filmu (2011) – documentary, as himself

=== Other contributions ===
- Pějme píseň dohola (1990) – writer and narrator

== Awards ==
- 2026 Medal of Merit
