= 2005 Czech Lion Awards =

Czech film award ceremony

13th Czech Lion Awards
- Date: February 25, 2006
- Site: Lucerna, Prague
- Hosted by: Jiří Macháček

Highlights
- Best Picture: Something Like Happiness
- Best Actor: Pavel Liška; Something Like Happiness
- Best Actress: Tatiana Vilhelmová; Something Like Happiness
- Best Supporting Actor: Miroslav Krobot; Wrong Side Up
- Best Supporting Actress: Anna Geislerová; Something Like Happiness
- Most awards: Something Like Happiness (7)
- Most nominations: Something Like Happiness (9)

Television coverage
- Network: Česká televize

2006 Czech Lion Awards ceremony was held on 25 February 2006.

== Winners and nominees ==
Best Film	Best Director
Something Like Happiness	Bohdan Sláma - Something Like Happiness
Best Actor in a Leading Role	Best Actress in a Leading Role
Pavel Liška - Something Like Happiness	Tatiana Vilhelmová - Something Like Happiness
Best Actor in a Supporting Role	Best Actress in a Supporting Role
Miroslav Krobot - Wrong Side Up	Anna Geislerová - Something Like Happiness
Best Screenplay	Design
Something Like Happiness	Lunacy
Best Cinematography	Best Editing
Something Like Happiness	The City of the Sun
Music	Sound
The City of the Sun	Wrong Side Up

=== Non-statutory Awards ===
Most Popular Film	Unique Contribution to Czech Film
From Subway with Love	Jan Němec
Film Critics' Award	Best Foreign Film
Something Like Happiness	Broken Flowers
Sazka Award for Unrealised Script	Best Film Poster
Night Owls	Lunacy
