= 2008 Czech Lion Awards =

Czech film award ceremony

16th Czech Lion Awards
- Date: March 7, 2009
- Site: Lcerna, Prague
- Hosted by: Bolek Polívka

Highlights
- Best Picture: The Karamazovs
- Best Actor: Karel Roden; Guard No. 47
- Best Actress: Zuzana Bydžovská; The Country Teacher
- Best Supporting Actor: Vladimír Dlouhý; Guard No. 47
- Best Supporting Actress: Lenka Termerová; Night Owls
- Most awards: Guard No. 47 (3); Tobruk (3)
- Most nominations: The Karamazovs (8); Tobruk (8)

Television coverage
- Network: Česká televize

2008 Czech Lion Awards ceremony was held on 5 March 2009.

== Winners and nominees ==
Best Film	Best Director
The Karamazovs; The Country Teacher; Tobruk	Petr Zelenka - The Karamazovs; Bohdan Sláma - The Country Teacher; Václav Marhoul - Tobruk
Best Actor in a Leading Role	Best Actress in a Leading Role
Karel Roden - Guard No. 47; Pavel Liška - The Country Teacher; Ivan Trojan - The Karamazovs	Zuzana Bydžovská - The Country Teacher; Martha Issová - Night Owls; Anna Friel - Bathory
Best Actor in a Supporting Role	Best Actress in a Supporting Role
Vladimír Dlouhý - Guard No. 47; David Novotný - The Karamazovs; David Novotný - Of Parents and Children	Lenka Termerová - Night Owls; Emília Vášáryová - Shameless; Zuzana Kronerová - The Country Teacher
Best Screenplay	Best Documentary
Bohdan Sláma - The Country Teacher; Petr Zelenka - The Karamazovs; Václav Marhoul - Tobruk	Citizen Havel; René; A Ghetto Named Baluty
Best Cinematography	Best Editing
Vladimír Smutný - Tobruk; Karel Fairaisl - Guard No. 47; F. A. Brabec, Ján Ďuriš - Bathory	Jan Mattlach - Guard No. 47; Vladimír Barák - The Karamazovs; Luděk Hudec - Tobruk
Music	Sound
Richard Horowitz, Sussan Deyhim - Tobruk; Jan A.P. Kaczmarek - The Karamazovs; Vladimír Godár - The Country Teacher	Pavel Rejholec, Jakub Čech - Tobruk; Zdeněk Taubler - Guard No. 47; Michal Holubec - The Karamazovs
Design
Juraj Jakubisko, Jarka Pecharová - Bathory; Jan Vlasák - Tobruk; Jan Tománek - Goat Story 2

=== Non-statutory Awards ===
Most Popular Film	Unique Contribution to Czech Film
Bathory	Juraj Herz
Film Critics' Award for Best Film	Film Critics' Award Best Documentary
The Karamazovs; The Country Teacher; Tobruk	Citizen Havel; René; Česká RAPublika
Best Film Poster	Best Foreign Film
Aleš Najbrt, Bohumil Vašák - The Karamazovs	No Country for Old Men; There Will Be Blood; Katyń
O2 Award for Legally Downloaded Film	iDnes Reader's Award for the Best Film
Gympl	The Country Teacher
