= 1999 Czech Lion Awards =

Czech film award ceremony

7th Czech Lion Awards
- Date: February 27, 2000
- Site: Lucerna, Prague
- Hosted by: Halina Pawlovská

Highlights
- Best Picture: The Idiot Returns
- Best Actor: Jiří Kodet; Cosy Dens
- Best Actress: Tereza Brodská; Double Role
- Best Supporting Actor: Jiří Bartoška; All My Loved Ones
- Best Supporting Actress: Anna Geislerová; The Idiot Returns
- Most awards: The Idiot Returns (5)
- Most nominations: The Idiot Returns (11)

Television coverage
- Network: Česká televize

1999 Czech Lion Awards ceremony was held on 27 February 1999.

== Winners and nominees ==
Best Film	Best Director
The Idiot Returns	Saša Gedeon — The Idiot Returns
Best Actor in a Leading Role	Best Actress in a Leading Role
Jiří Kodet — Cosy Dens	Tereza Brodská — Double Role
Best Actor in a Supporting Role	Best Actress in a Supporting Role
Jiří Bartoška — All My Loved Ones	Anna Geislerová — The Idiot Returns
Best Screenplay	Best Editing
Saša Gedeon — The Idiot Returns	Alois Fišárek — Canary
Design	Best Cinematography
Karel Vacek, Václav Vohlídal, Milan Čorba — The Melancholic Chicken	Jiří Macák, Jaroslav Brabec, Martin Čech — The Melancholic Chicken
Music	Sound
Vladimír Godár — The Idiot Returns	Radim Hladík ml., Ivo Špalj, Radek Rondevald — Eliška Likes it Wild
Unique Contribution to Czech Film
Miroslav Ondříček

=== Non-statutory Awards ===
Best Foreign Film	Most Popular Film
Shakespeare in Love	Cosy Dens
Worst Film	Cinema Readers' Award
Don't Worry and Steal	Cosy Dens
Film Critics' Award	Best Film Poster
The Idiot Returns	Aleš Najbrt — Cosy Dens
