= Jan A. P. Kaczmarek =

Polish composer (1953–2024)

Jan A.P. Kaczmarek
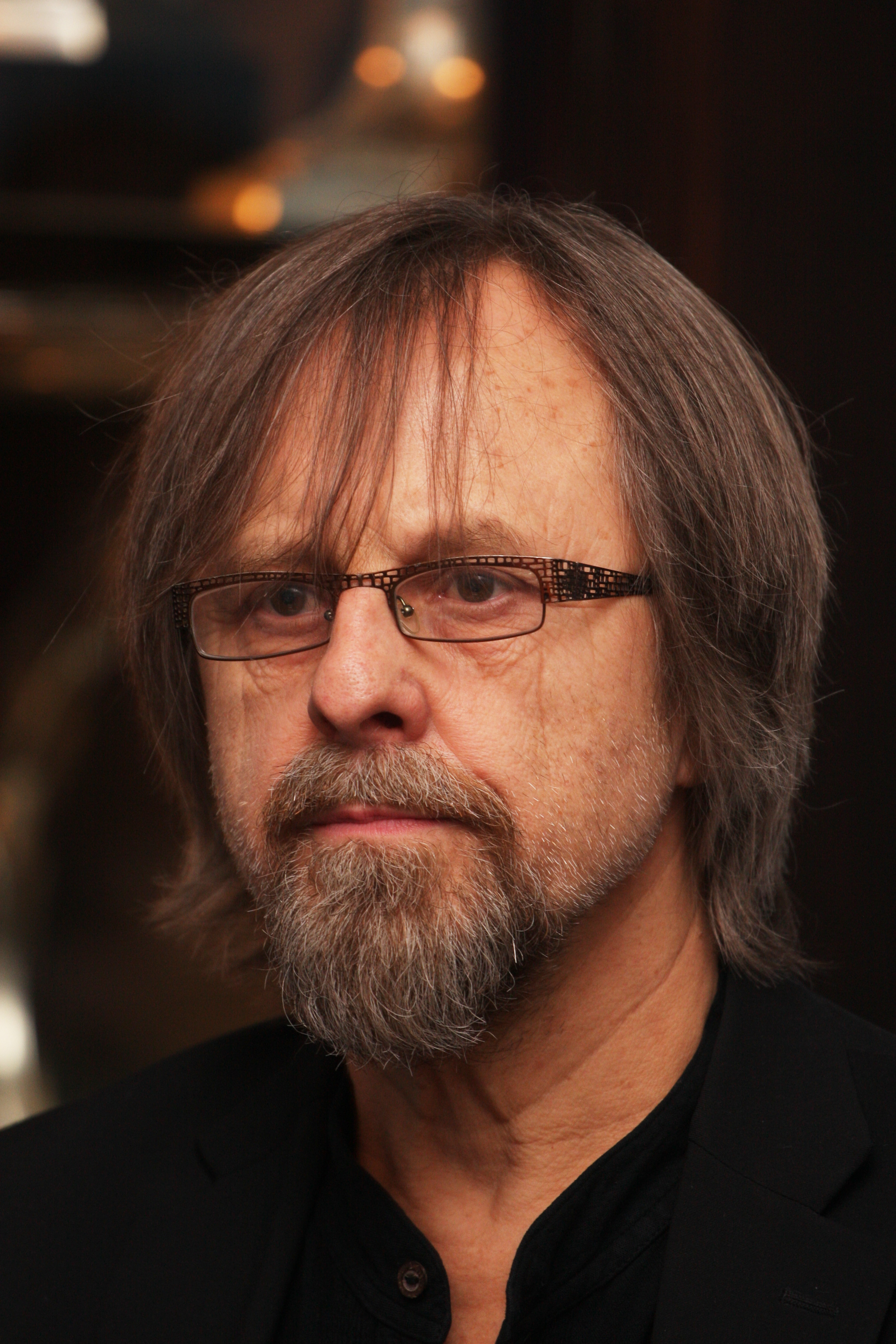
- Kaczmarek in 2011
- Born: Jan Andrzej Paweł Kaczmarek; 29 April 1953; Konin, Poland
- Died: 21 May 2024 (aged 71); Kraków, Poland
- Education: Adam Mickiewicz University (M.Jur., 1977)
- Occupation: Composer
- Years active: 1977–2024
- Spouses: Elżbieta Bieluszko (m. 1977; div. 2014) Aleksandra Twardowska (m. 2016)

Jan Andrzej Paweł Kaczmarek (Polish: [jan ˈandʐɛj ˈpavɛw kat͡ʂˈmarɛk]; 29 April 1953 – 21 May 2024) was a Polish composer. He wrote scores for more than 70 feature films and documentaries, including Finding Neverland (2004), for which he won an Oscar and a National Board of Review Award. Other notable scores were for Hachi: A Dog's Tale, Unfaithful, Evening, The Visitor, and Washington Square.

== Early life and education ==
Jan A.P. Kaczmarek was born in 1953 in Konin, Poland. Studying music from an early age, he graduated with a law degree, specializing in legal theory and philosophy of law, from Adam Mickiewicz University in Poznań (1977).

== Career ==
In the late 1970s, Kaczmarek started working with Jerzy Grotowski and his innovative Theater Laboratory. He created the Orchestra of the Eighth Day in 1977. He recorded his first album, Music for the End (1982), for the United States (US) company Flying Fish Records.

In 1989, Kaczmarek moved to Los Angeles, California in the US. In 1992 he won the Drama Desk Award for Outstanding Music in a Play for his incidental music for 'Tis Pity She's a Whore. His music has been released by Sony Classical, Decca, Varèse Sarabande, Verve, Epic, Milan, and Savitor Records. He gave concerts in the United States and Europe.

In 2005, Kaczmarek received the Academy Award for Best Original Score for Finding Neverland, directed by Marc Forster, on which he had worked with music editor Christopher Kennedy, among others. Kaczmarek also won the National Board of Review award for Best Score of the Year and was nominated for a Golden Globe and the BAFTA's Anthony Asquith Award for Achievement in Film Music.

In addition to his work in films, Kaczmarek was commissioned to write two symphonic and choral pieces for two important national occasions in Poland: Cantata for Freedom (2005) to celebrate the 25th anniversary of the Solidarity movement, and Oratorio 1956 (2006) to commemorate the 50th anniversary of a bloody uprising against totalitarian government in Poznań, Poland. Both premieres were broadcast live on Polish national television. Other concert works of the composer include Jankiel's Concert, The Open Window and Fanfare A2. On 10 May 2014, the world premiere of Universa – Open Opera, an opera written for the 650th anniversary of the Jagiellonian University, was held in Kraków's Main Square. Jan's last monumental work, Emigra – The Neverending Symphony, was performed in February 2017 in Gdynia, Poland.

Kaczmarek was a member of the American Academy of Motion Picture Arts and Sciences, European Film Academy and Polish Film Academy.

In 2007, Kaczmarek began working to set up a film institute in his home country of Poland. Inspired by the Sundance Institute, he intended for the new institute to serve as a European center for the development of new work in film, theater, music and new media. His Instytut Rozbitek (Rozbitek Institute) opened in 2005.

On 1 July 2015, he was awarded the Knight's Cross of the Order of Polonia Restituta.

Kaczmarek was the founder and director of the Transatlantyk Festival, held yearly in Łódź, Poland.

In 2023, he received the Lifetime Achievement Polish Film Award for his contribution to Polish cinema.

== Illness and death ==
In 2023, Jan's daughter stated that Kaczmarek was suffering from multiple system atrophy, for which there is no cure. He died in Kraków on 21 May 2024, at the age of 71.

== Works ==
=== Film ===
Year	Title
1993	White Marriage
1993	Doppelgänger
1994	Gospel According to Harry
1994	Dead Girl
1995	Total Eclipse
1996	Bliss
1997	Washington Square
1999	Aimée & Jaguar
1999	The Third Miracle
2000	Lost Souls
2001	Quo Vadis
2001	Edges of the Lord
2002	Unfaithful
2004	Finding Neverland
2006	Who Never Lived
2007	The Visitor
2007	Hania
2007	Evening
2008	The Karamazovs
2008	Passchendaele
2009	Horsemen
2009	City Island
2009	Get Low
2009	Hachiko: A Dog's Story
2010	Leonie
2012	The Time Being
2013	Tajemnica Westerplatte
2013	Joanna
2014	Inbetween Worlds
2014	Dancing Before the Enemy: How a Teenage Boy Fooled the Nazis and Lived
2016	La Habitación (Tales of Mexico)
2018	Paul, Apostle of Christ
2019	Valley of the Gods
2019	Underage Engineers
2020	Magnezja

=== Television ===
Year	Title
1993	Night Owl
1993	Empty Cradle
2001	Shot in the Heart
2002	A Soldier's Girl
2006	A Girl Like Me: The Gwen Araujo Story
2007	War and Peace
2008	Pinocchio
2009	The Courageous Heart of Irena Sendler

== Awards and nominations ==
Year	Awards	Category	Film	Result
2004	National Board of Review Awards	Outstanding Film Music Composition	Finding Neverland	Won
2005	Academy Awards	Best Original Score	Finding Neverland	Won
2005	British Academy Film Awards	Best Original Music	Finding Neverland	Nominated
2005	Golden Globe Awards	Best Original Score	Finding Neverland	Nominated
2009	Czech Lion Awards	Best Music	The Karamazovs	Nominated

== See also ==
- List of Polish composers
- List of Poles
- List of Polish Academy Award winners and nominees
