= Ladislav Trojan =

Czech actor (1932–2022)

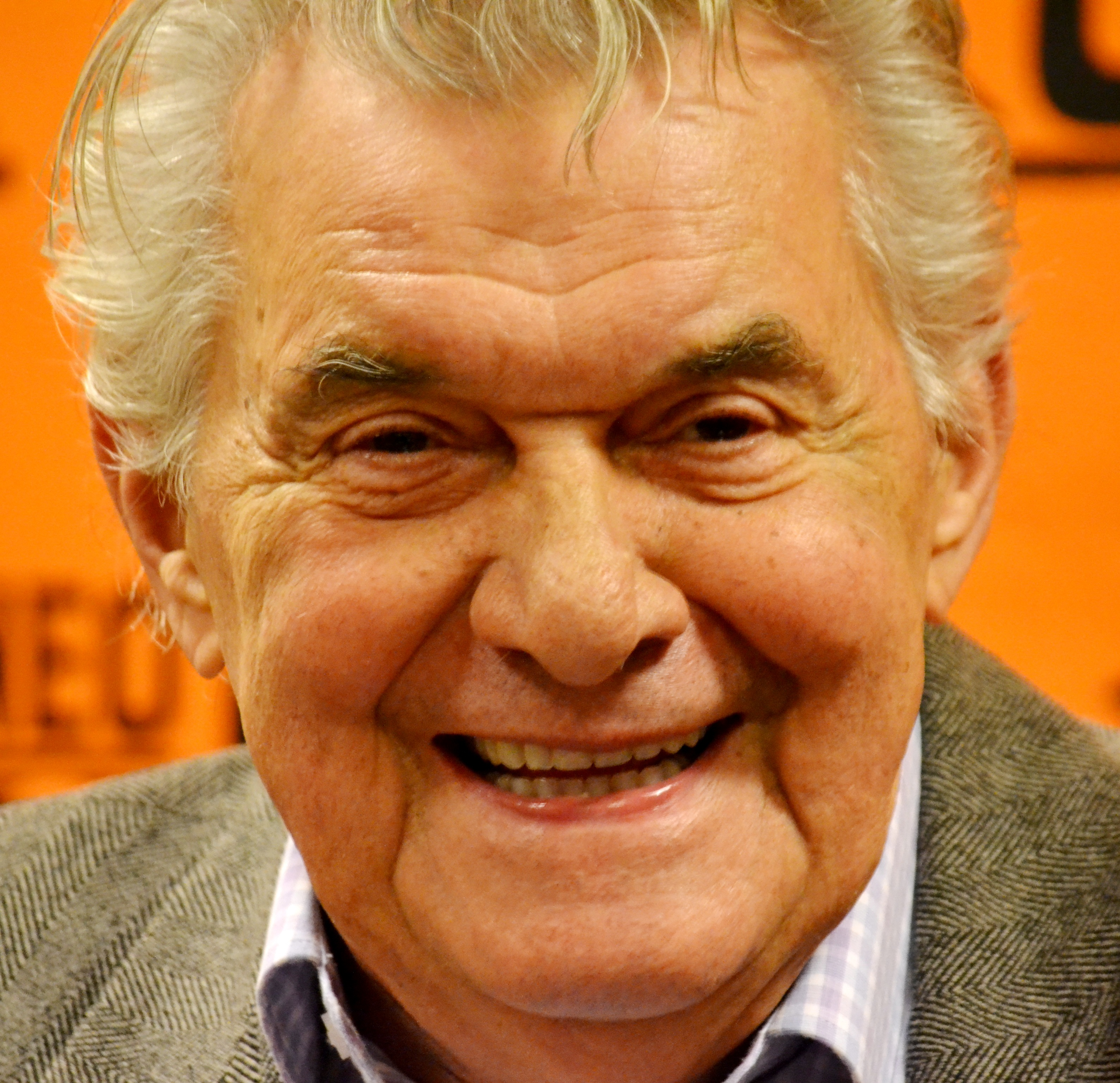
- Born: 1 August 1932; Prague, Czechoslovakia
- Died: 18 December 2022 (aged 90); Prague, Czech Republic

Ladislav Trojan (1 August 1932 – 18 December 2022) was a Czech actor.

== Biography ==
Born in Prague, Trojan began his career as a child actor in amateur theatre. He studied drama at the Theatre Faculty of the Academy of Performing Arts in Prague. As a student, Trojan made his film debut in 1954 film Silvery Wind by Fráňa Šrámek. Between 1959 and 1960, he starred in the first Czechoslovak television series, Rodina Bláhova. Between 1958 and 1965 he was part of the Zdeněk Nejedlý Realistic Theatre stage company, then he joined the Prague City Theatre company, with whom he stayed until 1996. He took part in several Summer Shakespeare Festivals and frequently toured nationally and abroad.

He retired from showbusiness in 2018.

Trojan died in his sleep on 18 December 2022 at the age of 90. He was the father of film director and producer Ondřej Trojan and actor Ivan Trojan.

== Filmography ==
His filmography includes over one hundred credits between cinema and television.

- 1960s: Leading role in Tři chlapi v chalupě.
- 1970: Devil and Káča, Czech black and white comedy TV film with Jiřina Bohdalová as Káča, Ladislav Trojan as devil and Jiří Krampol as shepherd.
