= Being Julia =

2004 drama film directed by Sebastián Szabó

- Original poster
- Directed by: István Szabó
- Written by: Ronald Harwood
- Based on: Theatre by W. Somerset Maugham
- Produced by: Robert Lantos
- Starring: Annette Bening; Jeremy Irons; Shaun Evans
- Cinematography: Lajos Koltai
- Edited by: Susan Shipton
- Music by: Mychael Danna
- Production companies: Serendipity Point Films; First Choice Films; Hogarth Productions; Myriad Pictures
- Distributed by: Sony Pictures Classics (United States, United Kingdom, Australia, New Zealand and South Africa); ThinkFilm (Canada); InterCom (Hungary); Summit Entertainment (Overseas)
- Release date: October 15, 2004
- Running time: 104 minutes
- Countries: United Kingdom; Hungary; Canada; United States
- Languages: English; French; Hungarian
- Budget: US$18 million
- Box office: US$14.3 million

Being Julia is a 2004 comedy-drama film directed by István Szabó and starring Annette Bening and Jeremy Irons. The screenplay by Ronald Harwood is based on the novel Theatre (1937) by W. Somerset Maugham. The original film score was composed by Mychael Danna.

== Plot ==
In 1938 London, popular theater actress Julia Lambert is growing disillusioned with her career as she approaches middle age, prompting her to ask her husband, stage director Michael Gosselyn, and his financial backer Dolly de Vries to close her current production to allow her time to travel abroad. They persuade her to remain with the play throughout the summer. Always hovering in the background and offering counsel is the spirit of her mentor, Jimmie Langton, the theatrical manager who gave Julia her start and made her a star. Julia confesses to Evie, her personal maid and dresser, that she would love to let herself go and retire so she can stop eating salad and drink as much beer as she likes.

Michael introduces her to Tom Fennel, an enterprising American, who confesses his love of her work. Despite loving Michael, Julia misses the passion they once had, and wants to fill the void left by her former lover, Lord Charles, who recently broke off their relationship.

Julia embarks on a passionate affair with Tom and supports him so he may enjoy the glamorous lifestyle to which she has introduced him. Their relationship revives her, sparking a change in her personality.

Michael suggests they invite Tom to spend time at their country estate, where he can become better acquainted with their son, Roger, who is only slightly younger. At a party there, Tom meets aspiring actress Avice Crichton. When Julia sees him flirting with Avice, she becomes jealous and angrily confronts him. He slowly reveals himself to be a gold-digging gigolo, but Julia is reluctant to end the affair.

Avice, now romantically involved with Tom, asks him to bring Julia to see her perform in a play in the hope that this will lead to Michael casting her in Julia's upcoming project. The play is dreadful, and Avice is not much better. Backstage, Julia compliments her even-worse co-star and barely acknowledges Avice, but promises to tell Michael about her. Afterwards, she forces Tom to admit he loves Avice and is heartbroken when he does. Tom then tells Julia he is "fond" of her. She pretends to be gracious as their affair ends, and assures him she will insist the ingenue be cast in her next play.

When Julia's performance in her current play begins to suffer from her personal discontent, Michael closes the production, so she visits her mother and her Aunt Carrie in Jersey, where Lord Charles comes to visit her. Julia suggests a romantic tryst, but he tells her that he is gay. The two laugh and agree to remain close friends. Meanwhile, back in London, Avice auditions for Michael and is cast in a key supporting role.

Julia returns home to begin rehearsals for the new play. She eventually learns from Roger that Avice has been one of Michael's casual trysts. Still, she is solicitous toward the girl, making suggestions that place her in the spotlight and insisting her own wardrobe be drab to allow Avice to shine.

On opening night, Julia waits for a crucial scene with only she and Avice, then discards her drab wardrobe and appears onstage in an extravagant ensemble. She improvises her lines and movements on the stage, confusing and embarrassing Avice, who understands Julia's intention and recovers, even garnering laughter and applause from the audience. Julia then improvises a dramatic, comedic speech in which her character confronts Avice's for pursuing affairs with both "Ben" (Tom) and "Sir Phillip" (Michael), and demands she choose between them. Stunned, Avice starts weeping, defeated by Julia, who ends her monologue and leaves the stage to enthusiastic applause.

Afterward, Michael confronts Julia and tells her she was magnificent. They embrace happily. Michael then visits Avice, who is throwing a tantrum in her dressing room, cursing Julia's name, and says that they are going to add Julia's ending to the play, then reminds her that she has just signed a contract for several weeks of performances. Tom, unsettled by Avice's screaming, slips out.

Instead of attending the opening night party, Julia goes to her favorite restaurant. Declaring that she wants to dine "quite alone", Julia enjoys a glass of beer.

== Cast ==
- Annette Bening as Julia Lambert
- Jeremy Irons as Michael Gosselyn
- Shaun Evans as Tom Fennel
- Lucy Punch as Avice Crichton
- Juliet Stevenson as Evie
- Miriam Margolyes as Dolly de Vries
- Tom Sturridge as Roger Gosselyn
- Bruce Greenwood as Lord Charles
- Rosemary Harris as Julia's Mother
- Rita Tushingham as Aunt Carrie
- Michael Gambon as Jimmie Langton
- Sheila McCarthy as Grace Dexter
- Leigh Lawson as Archie Dexter
- Marsha Fitzalan as Florence

== Production ==
Filming began in June 2003. Exteriors were shot on location in London and Jersey. Interiors were filmed in Budapest, including inside the Danubius Hotel Astoria, and Kecskemét in Hungary.

The soundtrack features a number of popular songs of the era, including "They Didn't Believe Me" by Jerome Kern and Herbert Reynolds; "Life is Just a Bowl of Cherries" by Lew Brown and Ray Henderson; "Mad About the Boy" by Noël Coward; "I Get a Kick Out of You" by Cole Porter; "She's My Lovely" by Vivian Ellis; "Bei Mir Bist Du Schon" by Sholom Secunda, Jacob Jacobs, Sammy Cahn, and Saul Chaplin; and "Smoke Gets in Your Eyes" by Otto A. Harbach and Jerome Kern.

The film premiered at the Telluride Film Festival and was shown at the Toronto International Film Festival, the San Sebastián Film Festival, the Vancouver International Film Festival, the Calgary Film Festival, and the Chicago International Film Festival before opening in the US in limited release.

The film grossed $14,339,171 at the box office.

=== Differences from the novel ===
The film omits much of Julia's recollections of her life and career with Michael and her previous affair with a Spaniard whose name she never knows. In the original story she meets Lord Charles when his wife attempts to insult her by bringing up her "common" origins. Although Julia's retort is the same in the film this scene occurs after she has already met Charles and the attempted insult is made by someone who is not married to him. Charles in the film is not married at all and turns out to be a confirmed bachelor.

In the novel, Julia has to persuade Michael to keep the lackluster Avice Crichton in the play in order to exact her revenge on her. In the adaptation, Michael is having a fling with her. In the novel Julia also employs a more subtle on-stage revenge against her rival.

Jimmie Langton also often appears as a figment of Julia's imagination giving advice or reacting to her actions, a device which is not present in the original story.

== Critical reception ==
Being Julia has received fairly positive reviews, with Bening receiving acclaim for her performance, and an average score of 65/100 at the review aggregator Metacritic, based on 38 critics, indicating "generally favorable" reviews. The film also has an approval rating of 76% on review aggregator website Rotten Tomatoes, based on 123 reviews, and an average rating of 6.70/10. The website's critical consensus states, "Annette Bening delivers a captivating performance in Being Julia, a sophisticated comedy that follows a 1930s stage diva who experiences an identity crisis at age 40".

In his review in The New York Times, A.O. Scott called the film "a flimsy frame surrounding a brightly colored performance by Annette Bening, whose quick, high-spirited charm is on marvelous display . . . She gives Being Julia a giddy, reckless effervescence that neither Mr. Szabo's stolid direction nor Ronald Harwood's lurching script . . . are quite able to match . . . Ms. Bening walks right up to the edge of melodramatic bathos (the hallmark of the kind of plays in which Julia stars) and then, in a wonderful climactic coup de théâtre, turns it all into farce. Being Julia may not make much psychological or dramatic sense, but Ms. Bening, pretending to be Julia (who is always pretending to be herself), is sensational."

Roger Ebert of the Chicago Sun-Times said, "Annette Bening plays Julia in a performance that has great verve and energy, and just as well, because the basic material is wheezy melodrama. All About Eve breathed new life into it all those years ago, but now it's gasping again . . . I liked the movie in its own way, while it was cheerfully chugging along, but the ending let me down; the materials are past their sell-by date and were when Maugham first retailed them. The pleasures are in the actual presence of the actors, Bening most of all, and the droll Irons, and Juliet Stevenson as the practical aide-de-camp, and Thomas Sturridge, so good as Julia's son that I wonder why he wasn't given the role of her young lover."

In the San Francisco Chronicle, Carla Meyer described the film as "a one-woman show" and added, "There are several notable actors in it, most of them quite good, but it's the glorious Annette Bening who hoists this flawed production on her mink-wrapped shoulders and makes it work . . . Her stage background at American Conservatory Theater shows in her multilayered tour de force."

Todd McCarthy of Variety observed, "Annette Bening has fun running the vast gamut of her emotions, be they authentic or manufactured. But Istvan Szabo's new film, like the W. Somerset Maugham novel upon which it's based, is a minor affair, a confection based on dalliances and the way a set of sophisticated theater people handle them, that lacks true distinction . . . Working in a much lighter vein than usual, Szabo has said he studied the films of Ernst Lubitsch and Billy Wilder in preparation for this picture. Unfortunately, Being Julia has little to do with the specifically Viennese strain of wise and winkingly cynical romantic comedy perfected by those two masters of the sexual charade and nearly everything to do with the world of pre-war London theater. This is a film that, above all else, needed to be steeped in Britishness, in the very particular mores and manners of the time; as a Canadian production mostly shot in Budapest by a Hungarian director and an American star and a number of Canuck thesps, this just doesn't happen. The deficiencies may be intangible, but they deprive film of the solid footing it requires . . . The majority of the seriocomic doings, while superficially diverting, provide neither indelible wit nor the gravitas of a genuinely meaningful comedy of manners (see Oscar Wilde), leaving a relatively wispy impression in its wake."

In Rolling Stone, Peter Travers awarded the film two out of a possible four stars and commented, "Annette Bening can act - watch American Beauty or Bugsy or The Grifters - but she works too hard to prove it in Being Julia . . . Director Istvan Szabo overplays his hand and traps [her] in a role that's all emoting, no emotion."

Mark Kermode of The Observer said, "Annette Bening makes a claim for an Oscar nomination . . . Chewing up the scenery in lipsmacking form, she savours the ribald dialogue like an overripe wine, spitting venom and self-pity in equally bilious measures, lending much needed weight to this contrived fluff."

== Awards and nominations ==
- Academy Award for Best Actress (Annette Bening, nominee)
- Golden Globe Award for Best Actress – Motion Picture Comedy or Musical (Bening, winner)
- Screen Actors Guild Award for Outstanding Performance by a Female Actor in a Leading Role - Motion Picture (Bening, nominee)
- Satellite Award for Best Actress – Motion Picture Musical or Comedy (Bening, winner)
- Satellite Award for Best Supporting Actor – Motion Picture Musical or Comedy (Jeremy Irons, nominee)
- Genie Award for Best Motion Picture (nominee)
- Genie Award for Best Performance by an Actor in a Supporting Role (Bruce Greenwood, nominee)
- National Board of Review Award for Best Actress (Bening, winner)
- London Film Critics Circle Award for Best Actress (Bening, nominee)
- Bangkok International Film Festival Golden Kinnaree Award for Best Actress (Bening, winner; tied with Ana Geislerova for Želary)
- Bangkok International Film Festival Golden Kinnaree Award for Best Film (nominee)
- European Film Award for Best Director (nominee)
- European Film Award for Best Cinematography (nominee)
- Southeastern Film Critics Association Award for Best Actress (Bening, winner)
