= One Hand Can't Clap =

2003 Czech comedy film

- Directed by: David Ondříček
- Written by: David Ondříček; Jiří Macháček; Ivan Trojan
- Produced by: David Ondříček
- Starring: Jiří Macháček; Ivan Trojan
- Cinematography: Richard Řeřicha
- Edited by: Michal Lánský
- Music by: Jan P. Muchow
- Release date: 18 September 2003
- Running time: 103 minutes
- Country: Czech Republic
- Language: Czech
- Box office: 46,192,534 CZK

One Hand Can't Clap (Czech: Jedna ruka netleská) is a 2003 Czech comedy film directed by David Ondříček.

== Cast and characters ==
- Jiří Macháček as Standa
- Ivan Trojan as Zdenek
- Marek Taclík as Ondrej
- Klára Pollertová as Sandra
- Isabela Bencová as Martina
- Kristína Lukešová as Andrea
- David Matásek as Jan
- Vladimír Dlouhý as Martina's father
- Jan Tříska as Standa's father
