= Film Critics' Award (Czech Lion Awards) =

Czech film award

- Country: Czech Republic
- First award: 1996–2013
- Website: https://www.filmovaakademie.cz

Film Critics' Award was one of the awards given to the best Czech motion picture.

== Winners ==
Year	English Name	Original Name	Director
1996	Kolya	Kolja	Jan Svěrák
1997	Buttoners	Knoflíkáři	Petr Zelenka
1998	Sekal Has to Die	Je třeba zabít Sekala	Vladimír Michálek
1999	Idiot Returns	Návrat idiota	Saša Gedeon
2000	Divided We Fall	Musíme si pomáhat	Jan Hřebejk
2001	Dark Blue World	Tmavomodrý svět	Jan Svěrák
2002	Výlet	Výlet	Alice Nellis
2003	Boredom in Brno	Nuda v Brně	Vladimír Morávek
2004	Champions	Mistři	Marek Najbrt
2005	Something Like Happiness	Štěstí	Bohdan Sláma
2006	Rules of Lies	Pravidla lži	Robert Sedláček
2007	Little Girl Blue	Tajnosti	Alice Nellis
2008	The Karamazovs	Karamazovi	Petr Zelenka
2009	Protector	Protektor	Marek Najbrt
2010	Walking Too Fast	Pouta	Radim Špaček
2011	Long Live the Family!	Rodina je základ státu	Robert Sedláček
2012	In the Shadow	Ve stínu	David Ondříček

=== Best documentary ===
Year	English Name	Original Name	Director
2008	Citizen Havel	Občan Havel	Pavel Koutecký, Miroslav Janek
2009	Forgotten Transports to Poland	Zapomenuté transporty do Polska	Lukáš Přibyl
2010	Czech Peace	Český mír	Vít Klusák, Filip Remunda
2011	All for the Good of the World and Nosovice!	Vše pro dobro světa a Nošovic	Vít Klusák
2012	Love in the Grave	Láska v hrobě	David Vondráček
