= 2005 Bangkok International Film Festival =

Edition of film festival

Official poster for the 2005 Bangkok International Film Festival

The 2005 Bangkok International Film Festival started on January 13 and ran until January 24. The Golden Kinnaree Awards were announced on January 21.

== Awards ==
=== Golden Kinnaree International Competition ===
- Best Film: The Sea Inside (Mar adentro), directed by Alejandro Amenábar, Spain
  - Being Julia, directed by István Szabó, Canada/United States/Hungary/UK
  - Clean, directed by Olivier Assayas, France/UK
  - Don’t Move (Non ti muovere), directed by Sergio Castellitto, Italy
  - Les Choristes, directed by Christophe Barratier, France/Switzerland
  - Innocent Voices (Voces innocents), directed by Luis Mandoki, Mexico
  - The Motorcycle Diaries (Diarios de motocicleta), directed by Walter Salles, Argentina/UK/USAGermany/Peru
  - Old Boy, directed by Park Chan-Wook, South Korea
  - Red Dust, directed by Tom Hooper, South Africa/UK (Opening Night film)
  - Shutter, directed by Pakpoom Wongpoom and Banjong Pisanthanakun, Thailand
  - The Syrian Bride, directed by Eran Riklis, France/Germany/Israel
  - Vera Drake, directed by Mike Leigh, UK
  - Želary, directed by Ondřej Trojan, Czech Republic
- Best Director (tie):
  - Christophe Barratier (Les Choristes, France/Switzerland)
  - Park Chan-Wook (Old Boy, South Korea)
- Best Actor: Javier Bardem (The Sea Inside, Spain)
- Best Actress (tie):
  - Annette Bening (Being Julia, Canada, UK)
  - Ana Geislerova (Zelary, Czech Republic)
- Lifetime Achievement Award: Vichit Kounavudhi (Thailand)

=== ASEAN Competition ===
- Best ASEAN Film: The Beautiful Washing Machine, directed by James Lee, Malaysia
  - The Buffalo Boy (Mua Len Trau), directed by Minh Nguyen-Vo, Vietnam
  - Crying Ladies, directed by Mark Meily, Philippines
  - Homecoming, directed by Gil Portes, Philippines
  - The Judgement (Ai-Fak), directed by Patham Thonsang, Thailand
  - Keka, directed by Quark Henares, Philippines
  - The Letter, directed by Phaoon Chandrasiri, Thailand
  - Perth, directed by Djinn, Singapore
  - Pisaj, directed by Chookiat Sakvirakul, Thailand
  - Princess of Mount Ledang (Puteri Gunung Ledang), directed by Saw Teong Hin, Malaysia
  - Rainmaker, directed by Ravi Bharwani, Indonesia
  - Sagai United, directed by Somching Srisuphab, Thailand
  - Spirits, directed by Victor Vu, Vietnam
  - True Love, directed by Kyi Soe Tun, Burma
  - Women of Breakwater, directed by Mario O'Hara, Philippines

=== Short films and documentaries ===
- Jameson's Best Asian Short Film Award: Birthday (Bertrand Lee, Singapore)
- Special Mentions:
  - Gay Or Not (Wai Yee Chan, Yee Nam Lou, Hong Kong)
  - Little Terrorist (Ashvin Kumar, India)
  - Down the River (Anucha Boonyawatana, Thailand)
  - Cut (Royston Tan, Singapore)
- Best Documentary: Born Into Brothels (USA/UK)
- Special Mentions:
  - Touch The Sound - for giving inspiration through sound and artistic treatment
  - Final Solution - for the courage of reflecting realities
- New Voices Award: Bharatbala (Hari Om, India)
