= Instytut Rozbitek =

Coordinates: 52°24′25″N 16°55′11″E

Instytut Rozbitek is a center near Poznań, Poland meant for development of new work in the areas of film, theatre, music and new media. The institute was founded by the Oscar-winning Polish composer Jan A. P. Kaczmarek in 2004. The Institute consists of the 19th-century castle and surrounding buildings, which are currently under renovation.

It is a place of workshops. In 2011 and 2012 it was one of the locations of the Master Classes workshops, during the Transatlantyk - Poznan International Film and Music Festival.

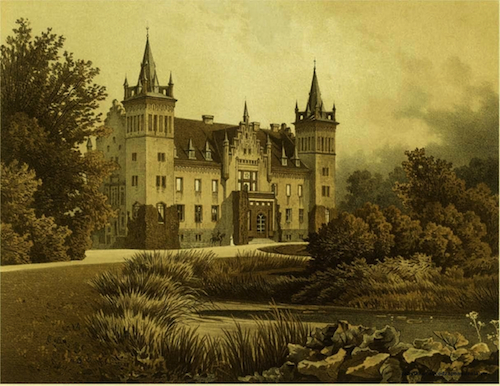
