= Tatiana Dyková =

Czech actress (born 1978)

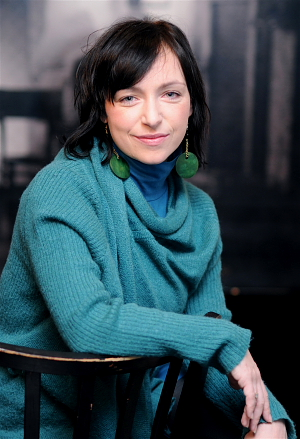
- Born: Tatiana Vilhelmová; 13 July 1978 (age 47); Prague, Czechoslovakia
- Occupation: Actress
- Years active: 1990-present
- Spouses: Pavel Čechák (m. 2005–2013) Vojtěch Dyk (m. 2019)
- Children: 3
- Awards: Czech Lion Award (2005)

Tatiana Dyková, née Vilhelmová (born 13 July 1978) is a Czech film and stage actress. She has been nominated nine times for the Czech Lion award, winning once for her performance in Bohdan Sláma's Something Like Happiness (2005). She has received recognition as Best Actress internationally, winning awards in Buenos Aires and Sochi, among others.

== Biography ==
She is 5 ft 3 in tall. During her childhood Vilhelmová took lessons in ballet for 9 years, and was a member of Kühn's Children Choir between the ages of 10 and 19. She left Prague Conservatory at 16 before finishing her studies, to start her acting career.

Vilhelmová made her professional debut in Indian Summer (1995), directed by Saša Gedeon, for which she received her first nomination for the Czech Lion. In 2000 Vilhemlová and co-star Anna Geislerová were co-winners of the Best Actress award at the Buenos Aires International Festival of Independent Cinema for their roles in the 1999 film The Idiot Returns. For the same film, Vilhelmová received an honourable mention at the Cottbus Film Festival. She followed this up by receiving a special mention for her role in the television film Společnice at the Monte-Carlo Television Festival in 2001. In 2002 a film she starred in, The Wild Bees, won the main prize at the Sochi International Film Festival. For her role in that film, she also won the Best Actress award.

Between 2002 and 2014 she was a regular member of the Dejvice Theatre. She was repeatedly nominated for Czech Lion awards, winning her first one after her seventh nomination in 2006 for her performance as leading actress in the film Something Like Happiness. She was part of the Czech dubbing cast for 2007 film Ratatouille.

She won the third season of the Czech reality competition Tvoje tvář má známý hlas, broadcast in 2017.

== Personal life ==
She married first husband Petr Čechák in July 2005 while in her seventh month of pregnancy. She has two sons with Čechák: František and Cyril. She married her second husband Vojtěch Dyk on 1 May 2019. With Dyk she has another son, Alois, who was born five years before their marriage.

== Awards ==
| Year | Nominated work | Award | Category | Result |
|---|---|---|---|---|
| 1995 | Indian Summer | Czech Lion Award | Best Supporting Actress | Nominated |
| 1996 | Whisper | Czech Lion Award | Best Actress | Nominated |
| 1998 | A Time of Debts | Czech Lion Award | Best Supporting Actress | Nominated |
| 1999 | The Idiot Returns | Cottbus Film Festival Award | Honorable Mention | Won |
| 1999 | The Idiot Returns | Buenos Aires IFIC Award | Best Actress | Won^{[A]} |
| 1999 | The Idiot Returns | Czech Lion Award | Best Actress | Nominated |
| 2000 | Společnice | Monte-Carlo TF - Golden Nymph Award | Special Mention | Won |
| 2001 | The Wild Bees | Czech Lion Award | Best Actress | Nominated |
| 2001 | The Wild Bees | Sochi IFF Award | Best Actress | Won^{[B]} |
| 2003 | Herself | European Film Promotion at Berlin IFF | Shooting Stars Award | Mentioned |
| 2004 | 0049 Divided | ČRo Award | Invisible Actor | Nominated |
| 2004 | Dirty Soul | Czech Lion Award | Best Actress | Nominated |
| 2005 | Something Like Happiness | Czech Lion Award | Best Actress | Won |
| 2014 | Nowhere in Moravia | Czech Lion Award | Best Actress | Nominated |
| 2015 | Home Care | Czech Lion Award | Best Supporting Actress | Nominated |
Note: Awards are listed in order of the effective years, annual ceremonies are usually held the following.

Notes

- A Award shared with co-star Anna Geislerová for her role of Anna in the same movie by Saša Gedeon.
- B Award shared with Eszter Nagy-Kálózy for her role of Katalin in Smoldering Cigarette (2001) directed by Péter Bacsó.
