= Květa Legátová =

Květa Legátová, born Věra Hofmanová (3 November 1919 – 22 December 2012) was a Czech novelist and writer whose work spanned a period from the 1950s to the 2000s. Her best known work, a 2001 collection of short stories and essays entitled "Želary," and her 2002 book, "Jozova Hanule," were adapted into the 2003 film, Želary. The film received a 2004 Academy Award nomination in the Best Foreign Language Film.

Born in Podolí, Legátová died on 22 December 2012 at the age of 93.

== Bibliography ==
- Korda Dabrová (1961) – childbook
- Želary (2001) – short stories
- Jozova Hanule (2002) – novel
- Návraty do Želar (2005)
- Nic není tak prosté (2006)
