= Podolí (Brno-Country District) =

- Municipality
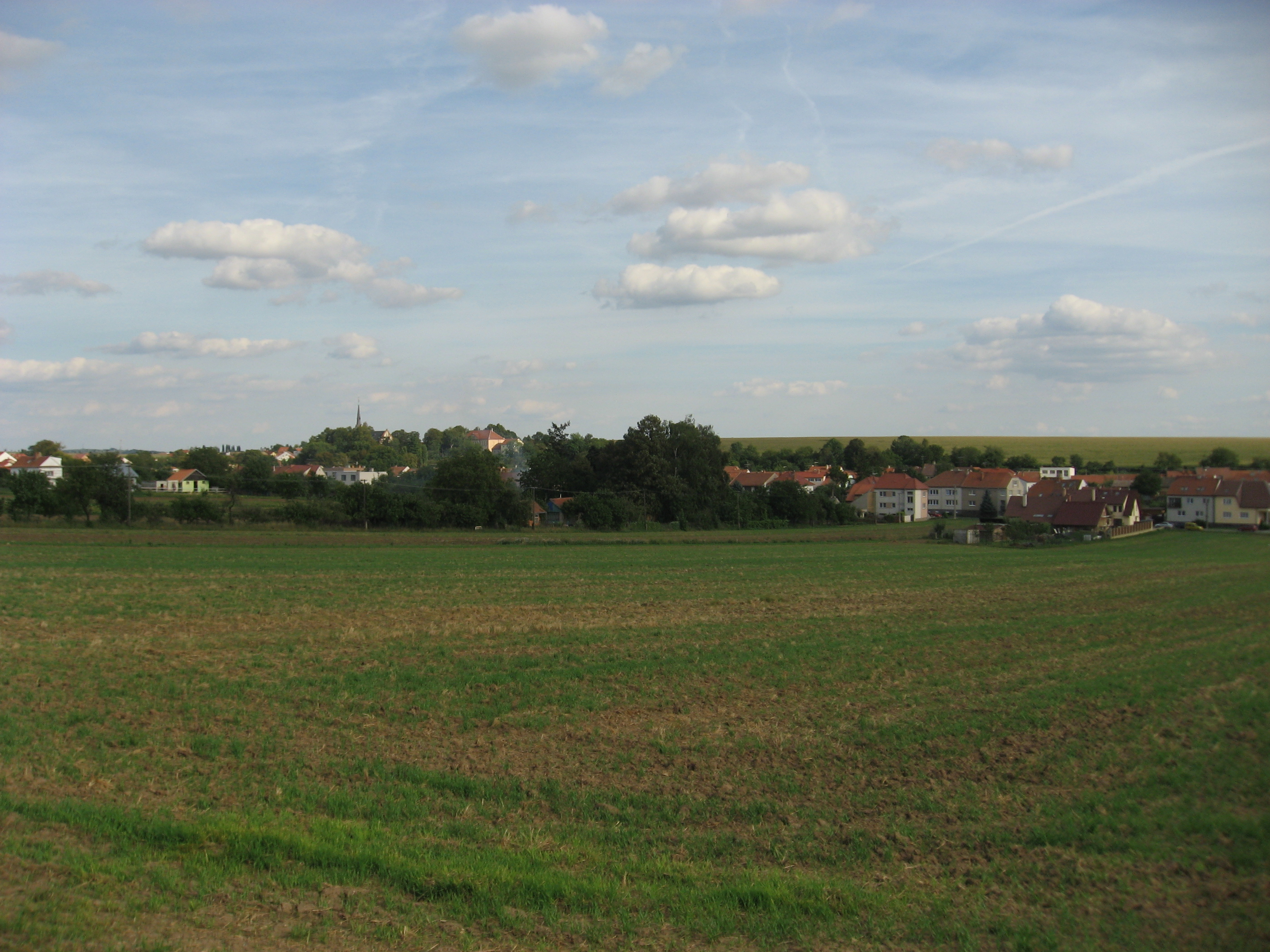
- General view of Podolí

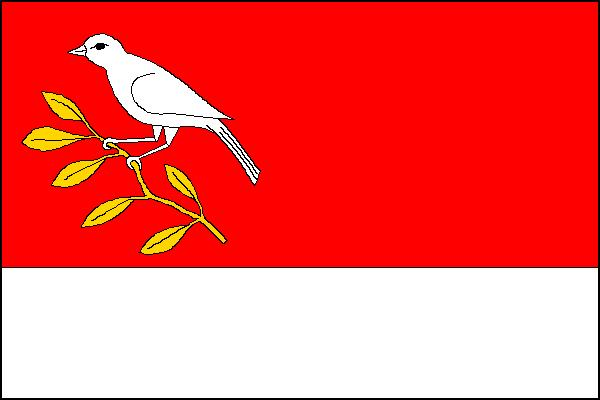
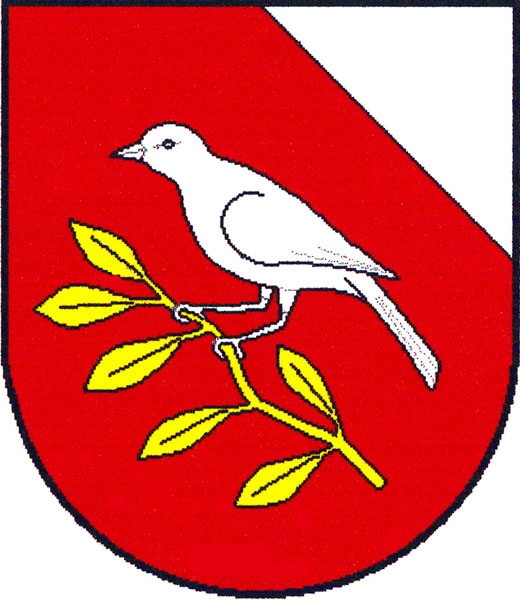
- Flag Coat of arms

- Location in the Czech Republic
- Coordinates: 49°11′26″N 16°43′15″E
- Country: Czech Republic
- Region: South Moravian
- District: Brno-Country
- First mentioned: 1237

Area
  - Total: 6.26 km^{2} (2.42 sq mi)
- Elevation: 238 m (781 ft)

Population (2026-01-01)
  - Total: 1,413
  - Density: 226/km^{2} (585/sq mi)
- Time zone: UTC+1 (CET)
  - Summer (DST): UTC+2 (CEST)
- Postal code: 664 03
- Website: www.podoliubrna.cz

Podolí is a municipality and village in Brno-Country District in the South Moravian Region of the Czech Republic. It has about 1,400 inhabitants.

Podolí lies approximately 8 kilometres (5 mi) east of Brno and 194 km (121 mi) south-east of Prague.

== Demographics ==
Historical population
Year	Pop.	±%
1869	793	—
1880	767	−3.3%
1890	1,008	+31.4%
1900	1,035	+2.7%
1910	1,233	+19.1%
1921	1,226	−0.6%
1930	1,358	+10.8%
1950	1,323	−2.6%
1961	1,365	+3.2%
1970	1,299	−4.8%
1980	1,148	−11.6%
1991	1,003	−12.6%
2001	1,010	+0.7%
2011	1,274	+26.1%
2021	1,418	+11.3%
Source: Censuses

== Notable people ==
- Květa Legátová (1919–2012), writer

== Twin towns – sister cities ==
Podolí is twinned with:

- Ay-sur-Moselle, France
- Kuchyňa, Slovakia
