= Jiří Macháček =

Czech actor and singer

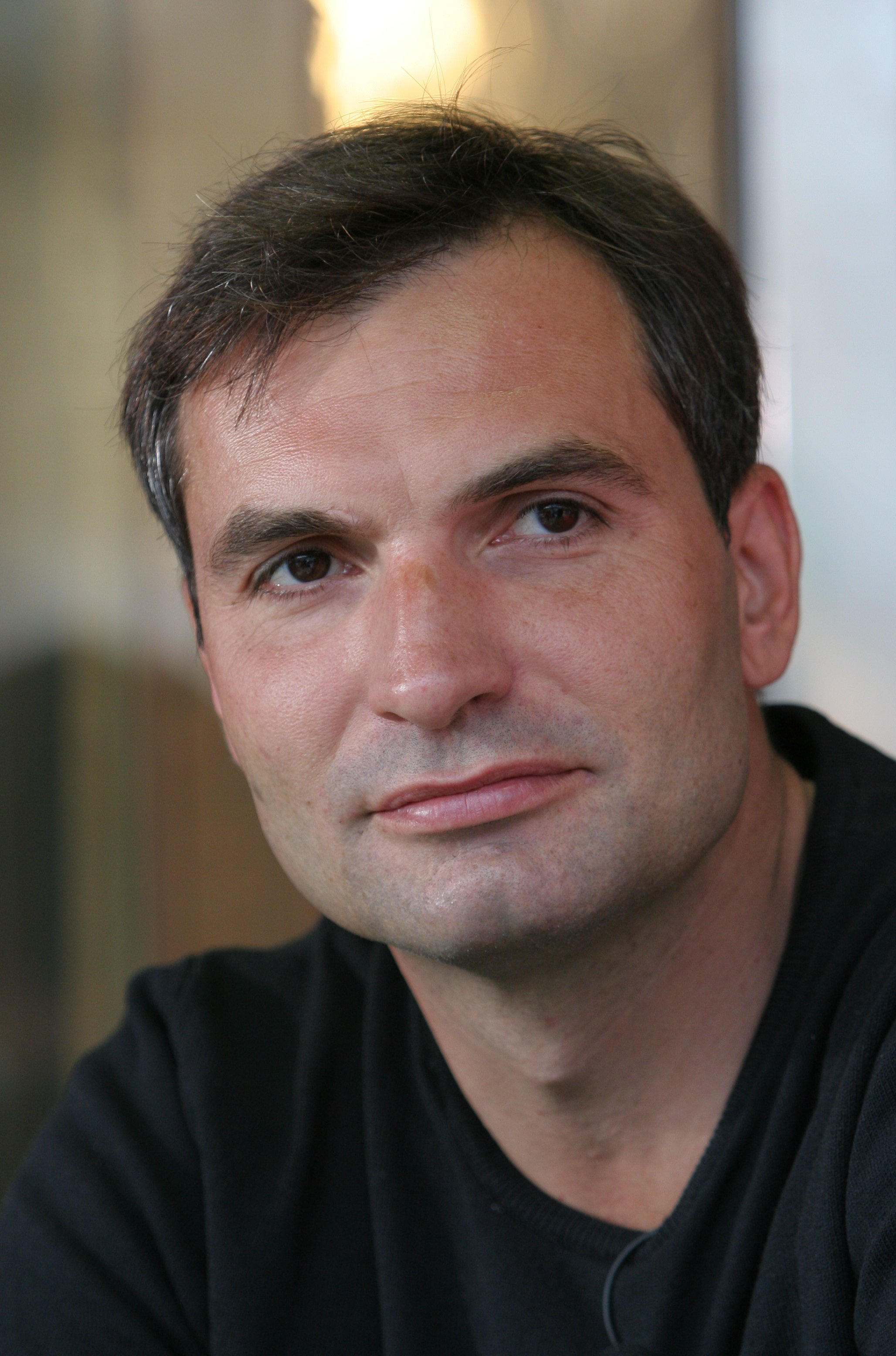
- Born: 6 July 1966; Litoměřice, Czechoslovakia (now Czech Republic)
- Occupations: actor, singer
- Years active: 1994–present
- Partner: Kristina Dufková

Jiří Macháček (born 6 July 1966 in Litoměřice) is a Czech actor and singer.

== Education ==
Macháček graduated from high school in Prague before attending Jaroslav Ježek Conservatory, the Law Faculty at Charles University in Prague, and the Theatre Faculty of the Academy of Performing Arts.

== Career ==
Macháček performed with several Czech theaters including the Theatre on the Balustrade (Divadlo Na zábradlí), Divadlo Sklep, and Divadlo Na Jezerce. His first major film role, in Saša Gedeon's comedy Return of the Idiot (1999), was followed by a prominent role in David Ondricek's Samotáři (Loners) in 2000, for which he won the Czech Lion for Best Supporting Actor. In 2004, he was again nominated for a Czech Lion for best actor in Jan Hřebejk's 2004 comedy Up and Down.

== Singer and lyricist ==
As well as acting, Macháček sings and writes songs for his band MIG 21, which has released five albums.

== Filmography ==
- Kamenný most (1996, Tomáš Vorel)
- O perlové panně (1997, Vladimír Drha)
- Mrtvej brouk (1998, Pavel Marek)
- Návrat idiota (1999, Saša Gedeon)
- Samotáři (2000, David Ondříček)
- Little Otik (2000, Jan Švankmajer)
- Výlet (2002, Alice Nellis)
- Jedna ruka netleská (2003, David Ondříček)
- Mazaný Filip (2003, Václav Marhoul)
- Up and Down (2004, Jan Hřebejk)
- Skřítek (2005, Tomáš Vorel)
- Beauty in Trouble (2006, Jan Hřebejk)
- Empties (2007, Jan Svěrák)
- Nasty (2008, Jan Hřebejk)
- Jahodové víno (2008, Dariusz Jabłoński)
- Ženy v pokušení (2010, Jiří Vejdělek)
- Občanský průkaz (2010, Ondřej Trojan)
- Kooky (2010, Jan Svěrák)
- Leaving (2011, Václav Havel)
- Men in Hope (2011, Jiří Vejdělek)
