= Loners (2000 film) =

2000 Czech comedy film

Samotáři
- Directed by: David Ondříček
- Written by: Petr Zelenka; Olga Dabrowská
- Starring: Ivan Trojan; Labina Mitevska; Jiří Macháček; Jitka Schneiderová; Saša Rašilov
- Cinematography: Richard Řeřicha
- Edited by: Michal Lánský
- Music by: Jan P. Muchow
- Release date: 2000
- Countries: Czech Republic; Slovenia
- Language: Czech

Samotáři (Loners) is a 2000 Czech comedy film directed by David Ondříček. The film stars relatively unknown (at the time) actors such as Ivan Trojan, Jiří Macháček, Jitka Schneiderová and Saša Rašilov and is considered to be a Czech cult classic. The story revolves around seven young people from Prague whose empty and unfulfilling lives gradually intertwine as a result of a series of unforeseen events.

== Synopsis ==
Petr (Saša Rašilov) works as a host on a popular radio station. He has just got separated from his girlfriend Hanka (Jitka Schneiderová) and uses his airtime to speak about his feelings after the breakup which angers his boss. Hanka, on the other hand, sees their breakup as an opportunity for a fresh start. One day, she 'accidentally' bumps into her ex-boyfriend Ondřej (Ivan Trojan), who learned about their breakup from the radio. Ondřej is a successful surgeon but also a psychopath who stalked her after the two had broken up a couple years ago. Ondřej explains that he is now a different person and has a family but also tries to persuade Hanka to return to him. Hanka refuses and warns him to stay away from her. She asks her friend Jakub (Jiří Macháček) to help her move things from Petr's flat to her parents' house. Jakub is a heavy marijuana user with serious problems with memory. While driving through the city, the two see a crashed car and transport its unconscious driver to a hospital. The surgeon who operates the patient is Ondřej who learns that one of the people who brought the injured driver was Hanka. He sees it as a sign that they should be together and immediately resumes stalking her. Meanwhile, Ondřej's wife Lenka (Dana Sedláková) together with her colleague Robert (Mikuláš Křen) bring Japanese customers of their travel agency to show them how Czech families normally live. For this purpose, they pick Hanka's family. Lenka wants to have an ideal poster family herself. Robert records the families on a camera but in his spare time, he also records other people in difficult situations for his own entertainment. One of the people he records is his terminally ill mother who gives him life lectures every time he visits her in the hospital. Robert meets Vesna (Labina Mitevska), Macedonian bartender who arrived in the Czech Republic to find her father. The two start dating and he even introduces her to his mother.

The brother of the injured driver, a professional magician, visits Ondřej in the hospital to thank him for the successful surgery. He gives him tickets to his show and Ondřej asks him if he could pick him as the volunteer for his disappearance trick. During the performance, Ondřej seemingly vanishes only to run away, dress as a plumber and sneak into Hanka's family house. Worried Lenka tries to find some clues into his disappearance and soon discovers a hidden stack of old photos of Ondřej with Hanka and him dressed as a plumber. One day, Robert and Vesna attend a rock concert and Robert asks her to go to the band's dressing room and bring him a signed guitar pick. Vesna fails to obtain the pick and when she returns to the club, Robert is gone. She asks Jakub to forge the signature but when she brings the signed pick to Robert's flat, she finds him with another woman. Instead of apologizing, Robert records crying and cursing Vesna humiliating her even more. Vesna meets Petr and tells him she's searching for extraterrestrials. The two become friends. Robert's mother dies and it greatly affects him, however, he does not seem to change as she had wished. He organizes a post-funeral party where Ondřej meets Hanka. Robert records Hanka's outburst. When the party is over, everyone in Robert's flat falls asleep but Ondřej soon wakes up and tries to set them on fire - something he already did after his first breakup with Hanka. The fire is extinguished without causing any injuries or damage. Jakub and Hanka enjoy spontaneous moments together and she seems finally happy. She is attracted to Jakub because of his bohemian style of life which contrasts with that of her own conservative family. Shortly after, Jakub's friend tells him he must pick up his girlfriend at the airport. Jakub, who forgot he had a girlfriend, tells Hanka what happened. Hanka is furious and tells him how drugs destroyed his brain, using exactly the same phrase her despotic mother (Hana Maciuchová) frequently uses. Ondřej returns home and Lenka tells him she knows about his past and the party at Robert's. She tells him that she knows exactly what he needs - to occasionally dress as a plumber. Confused Ondřej hesitantly confirms. At the end of the movie, Vesna persuades Petr to go on a blind date. She takes him to the Prague Metronome where he's supposed to meet his date. It turns out that it is Hanka whom he broke up with at the beginning of the movie.

== Accolades ==
The film won the Audience Award at the Warsaw International Film Festival in Poland. It also won three awards at the 2000 International Filmfestival Mannheim-Heidelberg and the Audience Award at the Thessaloniki Film Festival.

Actor Jiří Macháček won the Czech Lion Award for Best Actor in a supporting role in 2001 for his part in the movie, and the film was nominated in nine other categories, including Best Picture and Best Director.
