= Lunacy (film) =

- Czech theatrical release poster
- Directed by: Jan Švankmajer
- Written by: Jan Švankmajer
- Based on: "The System of Doctor Tarr and Professor Fether"; and "The Premature Burial" by Edgar Allan Poe; Works by Marquis de Sade
- Produced by: Jaromír Kallista
- Starring: Pavel Liška; Jan Tříska; Anna Geislerová; Martin Huba; Jaroslav Dušek; Pavel Nový
- Cinematography: Juraj Galvánek
- Edited by: Marie Zemanová
- Music by: Ivo Špalj
- Production companies: Athanor; C-Ga Film; Česká televize; Barrandov Studios
- Distributed by: Warner Bros.
- Release dates: 3 November 2005 (Palace Film Festival); 17 November 2005 (Czech Republic); 23 February 2006 (Slovakia)
- Running time: 118 minutes
- Countries: Czech Republic; Slovakia
- Language: Czech
- Budget: $50 million CZK
- Box office: $133,982

Lunacy (Czech: Šílení) is a 2005 animated horror drama film written and directed by Jan Švankmajer. It is loosely based on two Edgar Allan Poe short stories, "The System of Doctor Tarr and Professor Fether" (1845) and "The Premature Burial" (1844), and partly inspired by the works of the Marquis de Sade. The film was shot between October 2004 and April 2005, on location in the village of Peruc close to Prague, and in Švankmajer's studio in the village of Knovíz.

== Plot ==
Jean Berlot (Liska) is a deeply troubled man who has been haunted by violent hallucinations of being stuffed into a straitjacket by two orderlies since the death of his mother, who was committed to a mental institution before she died. While arranging his mother's funeral, Jean meets a fellow who claims to be the Marquis de Sade (Triska) and lives as if he is in 18th-century France rather than the 21st-century Czech Republic. Jean strikes up an alliance with the Marquis, though they can hardly be called friends, but is horrified by the Marquis' debauchery, namely the blasphemous orgy that Jean spies through an open window. The Marquis drops dead after choking on a banana the following day, and Jean is ordered at gunpoint to assist the servant Dominik (Nový) in burying the coffin in the family mausoleum. The next morning Jean and Dominik are awakened by a bell, and after opening the stone of the mausoleum, the Marquis reveals it had all been an elaborate prank. His mother had died after being buried alive, and he finds it therapeutic to relive this childhood memory that haunts him.

The Marquis suggests a therapy that could help with Jean's nightmares: voluntarily committing himself to an asylum managed by his friend Dr. Murlloppe (Dusek), who offers "Purgative Therapy" for people who are not mad but could be in the future. Jean falls for a beautiful nurse named Charlota (Geislerova), who claims she is being held at the hospital against her will, and reveals that Murlloppe and the Marquis were previous patients who led a revolt and locked the real asylum employees in the basement. The Marquis tells Jean that Charlota is a "nymphomaniac" and likes to tell complex fabricated stories as a form of foreplay. On the one year anniversary of their revolt, Murlloppe, the Marquis, and Dominik take Charlota with them for a ritual orgy, and Charlota tells Jean it is his only chance to free the staff. Jean finds them tarred and feathered in the basement, and releases the men, who waste no time in beating all the patients and shoving them back into their cells. Dr. Coulmiere thanks Jean for releasing them, and explains his philosophy that corporal punishment is key to treating mental illness by balancing the mind and the body, and that Murlloppe's idea of curing it with "freedom" is absurd. Murlloppe, the Marquis, and Dominik are tracked down and are each given severe punishments. Now that Charlota has been rescued, Jean expects to leave with her and get married, but Dr. Coulmiere will not permit Jean to leave until 8am, per the usual protocol. Jean has trouble sleeping, and seeks out Charlota for comfort, but her room is empty. He finds her in Dr. Coulmiere's room preparing for a night of sexual pleasures. This sets off one of his violent hallucinations, and Dr. Coulmiere eventually has to intervene. He orders the first round of corporal punishment treatment: two orderlies stuff Jean into a straitjacket and carry him away.

== Cast ==
- Jan Tříska as Marquis
- Pavel Liška as Jean Berlot
- Anna Geislerová as Charlota
- Martin Huba as Dr. Coulmiere
- Jaroslav Dušek as Dr. Murlloppe
- Pavel Nový as Servant Dominik
- Stano Danciak as Innkeeper
- Jiří Krytinář as Reciting Madman
- Katerina Růžičková as Asylum Inmate
- Iva Littmanová as Asylum Inmate
- Kateřina Valachová as Asylum Inmate
- Josef Kašpar as Insane Erotomaniac
- Miroslav Navrátil as Dream Warden
- Jirí Maria Sieber as Dream Warden
- Ctirad Götz as Ostler

== Box office ==
The film grossed $48,324 in the US and $85,658 from foreign markets for a grand total of $133,982.
