= Green Horse Rustlers =

- Directed by: Dan Wlodarczyk
- Starring: Pavel Liška, Marek Adamczyk
- Cinematography: Richard Řeřicha
- Music by: Juraj Dobrakov
- Release date: September 8, 2016
- Running time: 86 minutes
- Country: Czech Republic
- Language: Czech

Green Horse Rustlers (Czech: Zloději zelených koní) is a 2016 Czech adventure drama film.

== Plot ==
The film is about illegal digging of Moldavites. Kača starts to live by illegally digging Moldavites when he has to leave collective farm when it got bankrupt. He convinces his old friend Pavel to help him. Pavel is a geologist who recently got married. His wife Karolína isn't fond of Kača. Pavel quits his job at university when he sees how much he can earn by digging Moldavites. This gets him into conflict with his wife.

== Cast ==
- Pavel Liška as Kača
- Marek Adamczyk as Pavel
- Jenovéfa Boková as Karolína
- Gabriela Míčová as Jarmila
- Šárka Vaculíková as Marcela
- Bolek Polívka as Senecký

== Reception ==
The film has received mostly positive reviews from critics.
