= Lukáš Pollert =

Czech slalom canoeist (born 1970)

Medal record

Men's canoe slalom

Representing Czechoslovakia

Olympic Games
Gold medal – first place	1992 Barcelona	C1

Representing Czech Republic

Olympic Games
Silver medal – second place	1996 Atlanta	C1

World Championships
Silver medal – second place	1997 Três Coroas	C1

European Championships
Silver medal – second place	1996 Augsburg	C1 team
Silver medal – second place	2000 Mezzana	C1 team
Bronze medal – third place	1998 Roudnice nad Labem	C1
Bronze medal – third place	2000 Mezzana	C1

Lukáš Pollert (Czech pronunciation: [ˈlukaːʃ ˈpolɛrt]) (born 24 March 1970 in Prague) is a Czech slalom canoeist who competed from the late 1980s to the early 2000s. Competing in two Summer Olympics, he won two medals in the C1 event with a gold in 1992 and a silver in 1996.

Pollert also won a silver medal in the C1 event at the 1997 ICF Canoe Slalom World Championships in Três Coroas and the overall World Cup title in the C1 category in 1993. At the European Championships he won a total of four medals (2 silvers and 2 bronzes).

He took part in the Velvet Revolution in 1989 in Czechoslovakia which Pollert later considered more important to him than the gold medal he won at Barcelona three years later.

Being a Doctor of Medicine, Pollert retired in 2000 and is nowadays active in his career of a GP in ER of Prague's Military Hospital. He has published several books of interviews with other top Czech sportsmen ("Lukáš Pollert se ptá") and is an active videoblogger on the Vyladeno.tv website. With his partner, Pavla, he has six children, three sons and three daughters.

His sister is actress Klára Pollertová.

== World Cup individual podiums ==
	1st place, gold medalist(s)	2nd place, silver medalist(s)	3rd place, bronze medalist(s)	Total
C1	7	3	4	14

Season	Date	Venue	Position	Event
1991	30 June 1991	Mezzana	3rd	C1
1992	23 February 1992	Launceston	1st	C1
1993	25 July 1993	Lofer	1st	C1
1993	21 August 1993	Minden	1st	C1
1993	31 August 1993	Ocoee	3rd	C1
1994	17 July 1994	La Seu d'Urgell	1st	C1
1994	18 September 1994	Asahi, Aichi	2nd	C1
1995	2 July 1995	Tacen	1st	C1
1995	9 July 1995	Mezzana	2nd	C1
1996	25 August 1996	Prague	2nd	C1
1998	14 June 1998	Liptovský Mikuláš	3rd	C1
1998	13 September 1998	La Seu d'Urgell	3rd	C1
1999	20 June 1999	Tacen	1st	C1
1999	24 June 1999	Tacen	1st	C1
