= Jan Tříska =

Czech actor (1936–2017)

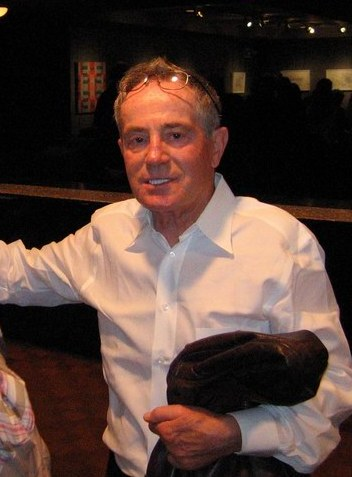
- Tříska in 2005
- Born: 4 November 1936; Prague, Czechoslovakia
- Died: 25 September 2017 (aged 80); Prague, Czech Republic
- Education: Academy of Performing Arts in Prague
- Occupation: Actor
- Years active: 1957–2017
- Spouse: Karla Chadimová
- Children: 2

Jan Tříska (Czech pronunciation: [ˈjan ˈtr̝̊iːska]; 4 November 1936 – 25 September 2017) was a Czech actor who played over 160 roles across stage, film, and television. He worked in the United States after emigrating there in the 1970s, but later returned to his native country following the Velvet Revolution. He was a three-time Czech Lion Award nominee, for Best Actor in Leading Role (Lunacy, 2005), and twice for Best Supporting Actor (Rád, 1994; Up and Down; 2004).

== Biography ==
Tříska was born in Prague on November 4, 1936. He studied at the Academy of Performing Arts in Prague. After graduating in 1959, he became the youngest member to join the National Theatre, where he acted in Karel Čapek's The White Disease and Vilém Mrštík's Maryša. He also worked with Otomar Krejča's Za Branou Theater (Divadlo za branou: 'Theatre Behind the Gate') and in municipal theatres throughout Prague. He appeared in many Czechoslovak films, and was the official Czech-language dubber of Jean-Paul Belmondo from 1965 to 1977.

=== Life and career in the United States ===
After signing the Charter 77 proclamation, he emigrated to the United States via Cyprus and Canada. His first American film role was in Ragtime (1981), directed by fellow Czech emigre Miloš Forman. He played supporting parts in Reds (also 1981, directed by Warren Beatty), The Osterman Weekend (1983, Sam Peckinpah), 2010: The Year We Make Contact (1984, Peter Hyams), The Karate Kid Part III (1989, John G. Avildsen), Apt Pupil (1998, Bryan Singer), as well as guest appearances on Highlander: The Series (1996), and Highlander: The Raven (1999). One of his more notable roles was as Joseph Paul Franklin, the would-be-assassin of Larry Flynt, in Miloš Forman's The People vs. Larry Flynt (1996).

=== Return to the Czech Republic ===
After the Velvet Revolution of 1989, Tříska visited the Czech Republic to perform in movies such as The Elementary School (1991), Horem pádem (2004), the Academy Award nominated Želary (2003) and Máj (2008; based on the poem Máj by Karel Hynek Mácha). In 2002, Tříska received an Alfréd Radok Award for his performance as Lear in King Lear at the Summer Shakespeare Festival at Prague Castle. In 2005, he was nominated for the Czech Lion Award for Best Actor in Leading Role for his performance in the Jan Švankmajer film Lunacy.

=== Later life and death ===
Although he occasionally visited the Czech Republic, Tříska remained a permanent resident of the United States in Los Angeles, California.

On 23 September 2017, for reasons yet to be determined, Tříska fell from the Charles Bridge in Prague. Passengers on a nearby boat rescued him from the Vltava River, after which he was resuscitated and hospitalized in serious condition. He died in hospital two days later on 25 September 2017.

== Personal life ==
Tříska was married to Czech actress Karla Chadimová (born 1943). He has two children, Jana and Karla, and two grandchildren, Augustin and Josephine.

== Partial theatre credits ==
=== American National Theater ===
- The Children of Herakles as Iolaus
- The Seagull
- Idiot's Delight

=== New York's Public Theater ===
- Master and Margarita
- Zastrozzi

=== La Jolla Playhouse ===
- The Hairy Ape
- Arms and the Man
- Cosmonaut's Last Message

=== Tylovo divadlo, Prague ===
- Srpnová neděle (1959) as Jirka (play by František Hrubín, directed by Otomar Krejča)
- Don Juan (1959) as Young Boy (Molière, directed by Jaromír Pleskot)
- Konec masopustu (1964) as Rafael (play by Josef Topol, directed by Otomar Krejča)
- Měsíc na vsi (1965) as Aleksej N. Beljajev (play by Ivan Turgenev, directed by Rudolf Hrušínský)

=== Divadlo za branou ===
- Kočka na kolejích (1965) as Véna (Play by Josef Topol, directed by Otomar Krejča)
- Three Sisters (1966) as Tuzenbach (play by Anton Chekhov, directed by Otomar Krejča)
- Oidipus (1971) as Oidipus (play by Sophocles, directed by Otomar Krejča)

=== Národní divadlo, Prague ===
- Bílá nemoc (1956-1957) as first assistant (play by Karel Čapek, directed by Jaromír Pleskot)
- Maryša (1956-1957) as Second Man (directed by Zdeněk Štěpánek)
- Saint Jane as Page (directed by Jaromír Pleskot)
- Romeo and Juliet (1963) as Romeo (National Theatre, Prague, directed by Otomar Krejča)

=== Others ===
- The Cherry Orchard: The Tempest (Guthrie Theater)
- Largo Desolato (Yale Repertory Theatre, Connecticut Critics Circle Award, Outstanding Male Performance)
- The Third Army (Long Wharf Theatre)
- Arsenic and Old Lace (Long Wharf Theatre)
- King Lear (2002) as King Lear (Summer Shakespeare Festival, Prague; Spišský hrad, Brno, directed by Martin Huba)
- King Lear (1961) as Edmund (Smetanovo divadlo, directed by František Salzer)
- Faust (1973) as Dr. Johann Faust (play by Johann Wolfgang Goethe, Divadlo Jaroslava Průchy, Kladno, directed by Václav Špidla)
- Kumšt (2007) as Mark (play by Yasmina Reza, Divadlo na Jezerce, Prague, directed by Jan Hřebejk)

== Selected filmography ==
- Váhavý střelec (1957)
- Pět z milionu (1959) - Vašek
- Kruh (1959) - Honzík
- První parta (1960) - Havíř
- U nás v Mechově (1960) - Lojzíček
- Všude žijí lidé (1960) - Lojza Posvár
- Pochodně (1961) - dělnický předák Josef Pecka
- Policejní hodina (1961) - Venca
- Srpnová neděle (1961) - Tomás
- Kde alibi nestačí (1961) - laborant Mirek Zach
- Kohout plaší smrt (1962) - Jozka
- Dva z onoho sveta (1962) - Robert Ford
- Tarzanova smrt (1963) - Clown
- Zlaté kapradí (1963) - Jura (voice)
- Mezi námi zloději (1964) - Man in Pub
- Začít znova (1964) - Jan Stehlík - brigade worker (voice)
- Komedie s Klikou (1964) - Rísa
- Hvězda zvaná Pelyněk (1965) - Lojzík
- The House in Karp Lane (1965) - Kowlorat
- Strašná žena (1965) - Honza Pokorný (voice)
- Pet miliónu svedku (1965) - Vysetrovatel VB Koval
- Lidé z maringotek (1966) - Acrobat Vincek
- Martin a cervené sklícko (1967) - malír a zámecký pruvodce Syllaba
- Hra bez pravidel (1967) - Duda
- Ctyri v kruhu (1968) - Michal Donat
- Kulhavý dábel (1968) - Rudolf (voice)
- On the Comet (1970) - Porucík Servadac (voice)
- Radúz a Mahulena (1970) - Radúz
- Návstevy (1970)
- Lucie a zazraky (1970) - Mikulás
- Dost dobrí chlapi (1972) - Kamil Gubris
- Slecna Golem (1972) - Petr
- Horolezci (1973) - Miso Lapsanský
- Wie füttert man einen Esel (1974) - Pepi
- Arabian Nights (1974) - Narrator (voice)
- Zivot na uteku (1975) - Vasek
- Tetované casom (1976) - Dr. Hocko
- Na samote u lesa (1976) - Dr. Václav Houdek
- Desat' percent nádeje (1976) - Mato
- Do posledneho dychu (1976) - Erich Fischer
- Maiden's War (1977) - Schwerdtfeger
- Ein irrer Duft von frischem Heu (1977) - Aventuro
- Talíre nad Velkým Malíkovem (1977) - Mine carpenter Salánek
- Nechci nic slyset (1978) - Marek's Father (scenes deleted)
- Ragtime (1981) - Special Reporter
- Reds (1981) - Karl Radek
- The Osterman Weekend (1983) - Andrei Mikalovich
- Uncommon Valor (1983) - Gericault
- Unfaithfully Yours (1984) - Jerzy Czyrek
- Nothing Lasts Forever (1984) - Swedish Architect
- 2010: The Year We Make Contact (1984) - Alexander Kovalev
- Black Eagle (1988) - Captain Valery
- The Karate Kid Part III (1989) - Milos
- Loose Cannons (1990) - Steckler
- The Elementary School (1991) - Igor Hnizdo
- Undercover Blues (1993) - Axel
- Rád (1994) - Prior
- The People vs. Larry Flynt (1996) - Joseph Paul Franklin
- Apt Pupil (1998) - Isaac Weiskopf
- Ronin (1998) - Dapper Gent
- Loving Jezebel (1999) - Melvin Szabo (uncredited)
- The Omega Code (1999) - 1st Prophet
- Lost Souls (2000) - Melvin Szabo
- Cahoots (2001) - Laphonse
- The Man from Elysian Fields (2001) - Marcus (uncredited)
- Rok dábla (2002)
- Blizzard (2003) - Otto Brewer / Trainer
- Trosecníci (2003)
- Želary (2003) - Old Gorcík
- Jedna ruka netleská (2003) - Otec Standy
- Horem pádem (2004) - Professor Otakar Horecký
- Lunacy (2005) - Marquis
- Máj (2008) - Hangman
- Hranari (2011) - Bishop
- Bastardi 3 (2012) - Majeruv obhájce
- Po strništi bos (2017) - Eda's grandfather (final film role)
