= Klára Pollertová =

Czech actress

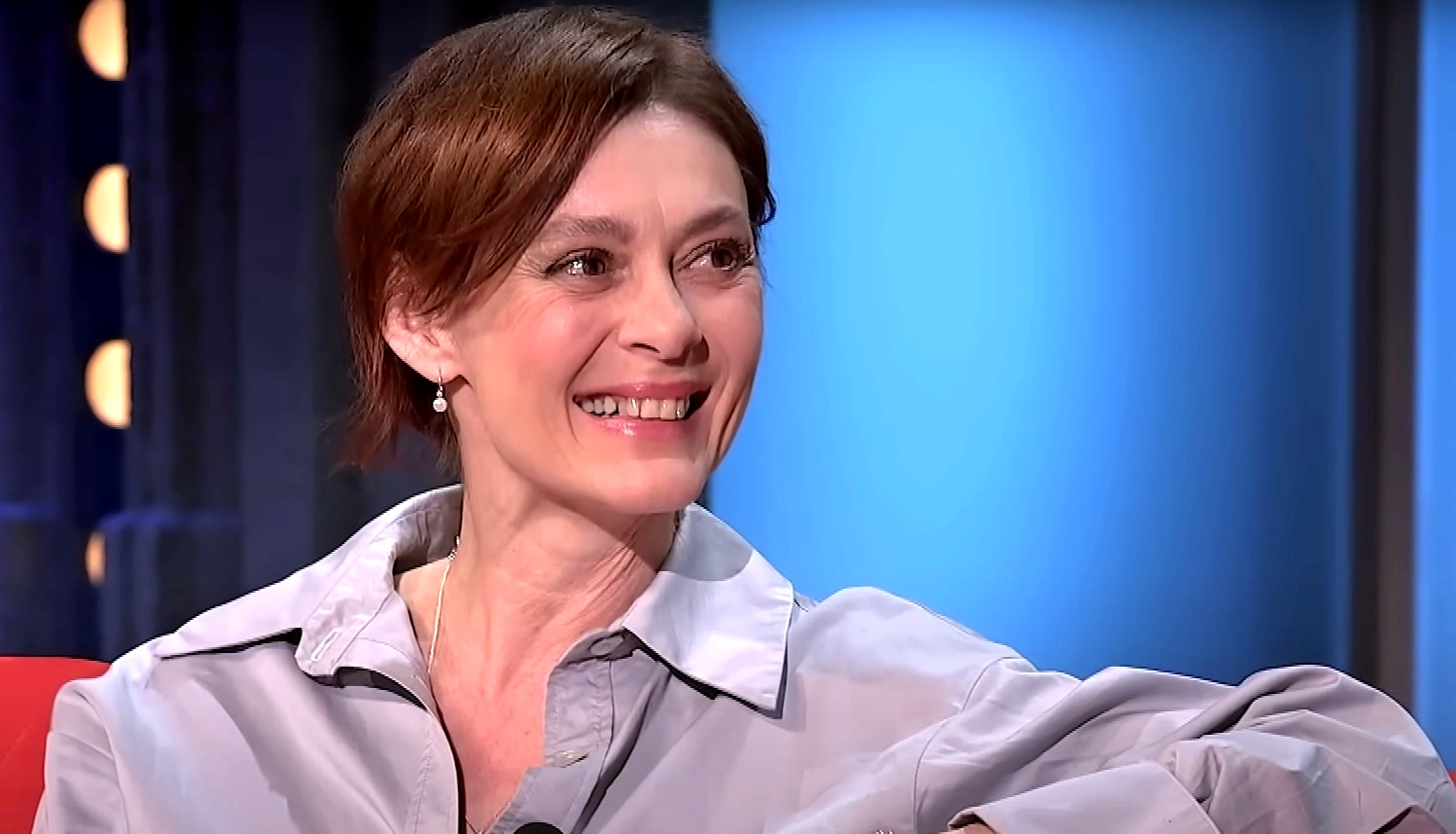
- Klára Pollertová-Trojanová in 2024
- Born: 17 September 1971 (age 54); Prague, Czechoslovakia, now Czech Republic
- Occupation: Actress
- Years active: 1979-present
- Spouse: Ivan Trojan (m. 1992)
- Children: 4
- Relatives: Lukáš Pollert (brother)

Klára Pollertová (born 17 September 1971 in Prague) is a Czech actress.

== Biography ==
She comes from a sporting and artistic family; her brother Lukáš Pollert is an Olympic champion from the 1992 Summer Olympic Games in Barcelona.

She made her film debut as a child in 1979 in the eponymous film adaptation of Čapek's Hordubal. In 1983, she appeared in the television series Visitors. In 1989, she played one of the main protagonists in Come Back Into the Grave!. Together with her husband, Ivan Trojan, she played his wife in the film One Hand Cannot Clap (2003).

After graduating from secondary school she studied acting at the Academy of Performing Arts in Prague, where she earned a MgA. degree, and began to act in 1994 at the Drama Studio in Ústí nad Labem. Since 1995 she has been a member of the Prague Theatre under Palmovkou.

== Personal life ==
Since 1992, her husband is the Czech actor Ivan Trojan, with whom she has four sons - František (born 1999), Josef (born 2001), Antonín (born 2009) and Václav (born 2012).

== Filmography ==
- 1979 – The Hordubal (Hafia)
- 1980 – The Golden Hen
- 1981 – The Owl's Nest (tents)
- 1981 – Counting Sheep (girl Hana's bed)
- 1983 – Visitors (Ali Lábusová, classmate Adam)
- 1983 – Keys to the City (Martina)
- 1985 – The Little Village (Majka Pávková)
- 1985 – The teeth and hearts (Susan)
- 1986 – The operation of my daughter (Milena)
- 1989 – Go back to the grave! (Student Eva Málková)
- 1989 – The Torture of Imagination
- 1993 – Mussolini – The Road to Power (Carmen)
- 1993 – The Sea is silent (girl)
- 1993 – Giovane Mussolini, Il
- 1994 – Gracious viewer pardons (Therese – Marie)
- 1995 – Your World (student film)
- 1995 – The Tale of God's people and pharmacy (Justynka)
- 1996 – The Prince boxes (Vítěnka)
- 1996 – It is not like a sponge sponge (Berta)
- 1996 – As Mr. Pinajs bought from fat cat (Bride)
- 1996 – The girl with an uncanny memory (Anabel Frídmanová, rising singing star)
- 1997 – Vojtík and spirits (Kunhutina niece Veronica)
- 1997 – Dangerous Liaisons (theater recording)
- 1997 – Cyprian headless and great-great-grandfather (Kunhutina niece Veronica)
- 1999 – Victims: Assault (Hrabánková, Igor's wife)
- 2003 – One Hand Can't Clap (Sandra)
- 2007 – half-life (Karla)
- 2008 – Love is
- 2009 – Taste of summer
- 2009 – Archive (Křižáková woman in the apartment)
- 2012 – CSI Angel – Part Doll (Marta Skálová)
- 2012 – In the shadow of (the woman in the ambulance)
- 2012 – Smichov crying, Brooklyn sleeping (Jana)
- 2012 – Do not Stop (mother Miki)
- 2012 – Four Suns (Jerry's mother)

== Documentary ==
- 2003 – Night with Angel
- 2011 – 13th Chamber Clara Pollertová-Trojanova

== TV ==
- 2012 – Mirror of Your Life
- 1983 - Expedition Adam 84

== Dubbing ==
- 1994 – TV movie The Return of Lew Harper – voicing Melanie Griffith (Schuyler Devereaux)
- 1998 – The TV movie Only love – [dubbing Hallmark] – Marisa Tomei (Evie)
- 1999 – TV film Obsession Ayn Rand – [dubbing Hallmark] – Julie Delpy (Barbara Brandenová)

== Theater ==
- Činoherní klub
  - 1991 – Utrpení mladého Medarda (Anička)
  - 1991 – Orestés (Hermiona)
- Narodni theater (Stavovské divadlo)
  - 1991 – Sbohem, Sókrate (Klára) – vystupovala v alternaci s Barbarou Kodetovou
- DISK Theater
  - 1992 – Její pastorkyňa (Jenůfa) – divadelní představení na DAMU
  - 1993 – Kurva svatá (Tonka) – divadelní představení na DAMU
- Činoherní studio Ústí nad Labem
  - 1993 – Kurva svatá (Tonka) – divadelní představení na DAMU
  - 1993 – Její pastorkyňa (Jenůfa)
  - 1993 – Tři mušketýři (D'Artagnanova matka / Ketty)
  - 1994 – Valašská čtverylka (Votruba)
  - 1994 – Procitnutí jara (Vendla)
  - 1994 – Na malém dvorci (Aneta Vaševičová)
  - 1994 – Romeo a Julie (Julie)
  - 1995 – Císařův mim (Pamela)
- Palmovkou Theater
  - 1996–1997 – Život je sen (Rosaura, dáma)
  - 1996–1999 – Jak se vám líbí (Rosalinda) – vystupovala v alternaci
  - 1997 – Nebezpečné vztahy (Prezidentová de Tourvel) – vystupovala v alternaci s Miroslavou Pleštilovou
  - 1997–1999 – Kouzelník z Lublinu (Magda)
  - 1998–1999 – Pitvora (Beatriz – Juana)
  - 2001 – Ubohý vrah (Druhá herečka)
- Reznicke Theater
  - 1997 – Snídaně u Tiffanyho (Holly)
- Svandovo Theater
  - 2002–2003 – Čas katů (Mme Charpennet / Popravovaná žena)
  - 2003 – Clavijo (Marie)
  - 2003–2007 – Poručík z Inishmoru (Maired)
  - 2003–2008 – Znalci (Kiki)
  - 2003–2005 – Ženitba (Duňaša)
  - 2004–2005 – Vášeň jako led aneb Myšlenka pana Doma (Félie, milenka pana Doma)
  - 2004–2006 – Vojcek - Der Romantiker (Markéta, manželka Profesora)
  - 2005–2007 – Klářiny vztahy (Klára)
  - 2005–2010 – Žebrácká opera (Jenny) – vystupovala v alternaci s Janou Strykovou
  - 2006–2008 – Mobile Horror (Terhi)
  - 2006–2008 – Periferie (Paní)
  - 2007 – Bomby, prachy a láska! (Gnazezza Monnezza)
  - 2008 – Její pastorkyňa (Kolušina)
  - 2008 – Dorotka (Adéla)
  - 2008–2009 – Oděsa (Pelegeja, místní kurtizána) – roli později převzala Blanka Popková
  - 2009 – Kdo je tady ředitel? (Mette) – roli později převzaly Šárka Urbanovská a Blanka Popková
- Viola Theater
  - 2008 – Noc po rozvodu (Ona)
- Leti Theater
  - 2009 – Večeře
- Broadway
  - Od 2013 – Večírek – vystupuje v alternaci s Miroslavou Pleštilovou
