= Ivan Trojan =

Czech actor

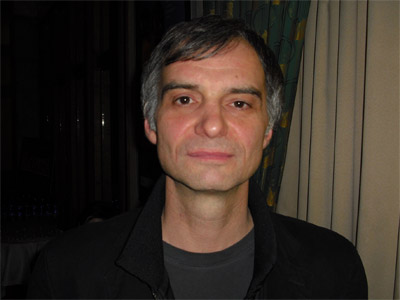
- Ivan Trojan
- Born: 30 June 1964 (age 61); Prague, Czechoslovakia
- Occupation: Actor
- Years active: 1988–present
- Spouse: Klára Pollertová (m. 1992)
- Children: 4
- Relatives: Ladislav Trojan (father), Ondřej Trojan (brother)

Ivan Trojan (born 30 June 1964) is a Czech actor, widely considered to be one of the greatest Czech actors of all time. With four Czech Lions for Best Actor in a Leading Role, he has also won two for his supporting roles in Seducer and One Hand Can't Clap, making him the most awarded performer at the Czech Lion Awards.

== Career ==
Trojan was born in Prague. He graduated from the Faculty of Theatre of the Academy of Performing Arts in Prague in 1988 and Realistické divadlo Zdeňka Nejedlého (RDZN) in Prague-Smíchov. He holds a Master of Fine Arts degree from the Academy. In 1992 he moved to Divadlo na Vinohradech (DNV). In 1997 he decided to move to a newly established Dejvické divadlo (DD). At the International TV Festival in Monte Carlo 2013, Ivan Trojan was awarded the prize of Golden Nymph for the Best Actor in the mini-series Burning Bush.

Trojan is acclaimed for his performances in films Loners (2000), Želary (2003), Václav (2007), The Karamazovs (2008), In the Shadow (2012) and Angel of the Lord 2 (2016), all gaining success at the box-office and critic circles. He is also known for his award-winning and lauded appearances at the Dejvice Theatre, the Vinohrady Divadlo and the Summer Shakespeare Festival, including Stanley Kowalski in A Streetcar Named Desire, Demetrius in A Midsummer Night's Dream, Eugen Bazarov in Father and Sons and the Father in The Brothers Karamazov.

== Personal life ==
He is son of actor Ladislav Trojan and brother of producer and director Ondřej Trojan. He is married to actress Klára Pollertová-Trojanová with four sons – František (born 1999), Josef (born 2001), Antonín (born 2009) and Václav (born 2012)

Trojan is known for being a supporter of the Bohemians 1905 football club. In 2009, at the age of 44, he played seven minutes for the club in a competitive match against FK Ústí nad Labem in the Czech National Football League.

== Theatre ==
=== Dejvice Theatre ===
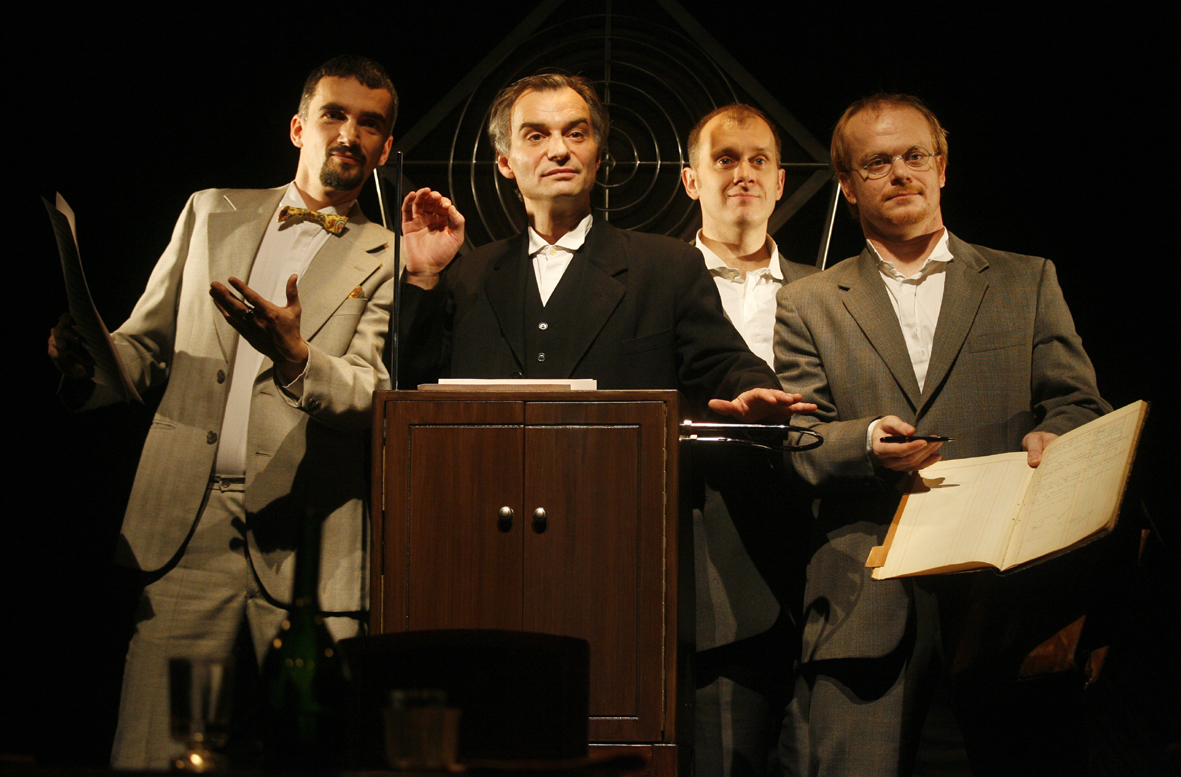
Ivan Trojan in the title role of the play Teremin by Petr Zelenka from left: Martin Myšička, Ivan Trojan, Jiří Bábek, David Novotný Photo: Hynek Glos

- Teremin (2005) .... Léon Theremin, nominated for Alfréd Radok Award
- A Streetcar Named Desire (2003) .... Stanley
- Sic (2003) .... Theo (by Melissa James Gibson)
- Three Sisters (2002) .... Aleksander Ignayevitch Vershinin
- Tales of Common Insanity (2001) .... Petr
- Oblomov (2000) .... The Title Role - received Thalia Award, nominated for Alfréd Radok Award
- The Brothers Karamazov (2000) .... Father Karamazov - Devil
- The Incredible and Sad Tale of Innocent Eréndira and her Heartless Grandmother (1999) .... Red Indian
- The Government Inspector (1998) .... Anton Antonovitch Skvoznik - Duchanovskij, hetman
- Utišující metoda (1997) .... Professor Maillard (by Edgar Allan Poe), nominated for Thalia Award

=== Vinohrady Theatre ===
- The Brothers Karamazov (1997) .... Ivan
- A Flea in Her Ear (1996) .... Kamil Champsboisy (by Georges Feydeau
- Jacobowski and the Colonel (1995) .... Head of Policemen (by Franz Werfel)
- Fathers and Sons (1995) .... Eugen Bazarov
- Clown (August August August) (1994) .... August jr. (by Pavel Kohout
- Le baruffe chiozzotte (1994) .... Commissioner (by Carlo Goldoni)
- Romeo and Juliet (1992) .... Romeo
- A Midsummer Night's Dream (1990) .... Demetrius, Summer Shakespeare Festival
- Merlin oder das wüste Land (1988) .... Parsifal (by Tankred Dorst, RDZN)

=== Other ===
- Nesles Tower (1996) .... Night of Orgies (by Pierre Henri Cami), Divadlo Viola

== Selected filmography ==
- 2000 – Četnické humoresky (Bedřich Jarý)
- 2000 – Loners (Ondřej), nominated for Czech Lion Award
- 2002 – The Brats (Marek Sir (father)), received Czech Lion Award
- 2002 – Seducer (Karel)
- 2003 – Želary (Richard)
- 2003 – One Hand Can't Clap (Zdenek), received Czech Lion Award for best actor, also co-writer of the screenplay
- 2005 – Wrong Side Up (Petr Hanek)
- 2005 – Angel of the Lord (Petronel)
- 2007 – Medvídek (Ivan)
- 2007 – Václav (Václav Vingl)
- 2008 – The Karamazovs (father)
- 2012 – In the Shadow
- 2012 – Burning Bush (Major Jireš)
- 2016 – Angel of the Lord 2 (Petronel)
- 2020 – Charlatan (Jan Mikolášek)

== Dubbing works ==
- 2016 – Finding Dory – Marlin (Albert Brooks)
- 2016 – Kung Fu Panda 3 – Master Monkey (Jackie Chan)
- 2014 – Touch – Martin Bohm (Kiefer Sutherland)
- 2013 – The Girl Who Kicked the Hornets' Nest – Michael Nyqvist (Mikael Blomkvist)
- 2013 – The Girl Who Played with Fire – Michael Nyqvist (Mikael Blomkvist)
- 2013 – The Girl With The Dragon Tattoo – Michael Nyqvist (Mikael Blomkvist)
- 2013 – Epic – Mandrake (Christoph Waltz)
- 2012 – The Killing – Troels Hartmann (Lars Mikkelsen)
- 2011 – Kung Fu Panda 2 – Master Monkey (Jackie Chan)
- 2010 – Megamind – Minion (David Cross)
- 2009 – Monsters Vs. Aliens – Dr. Cockroach (Hugh Laurie)
- 2008 – Kung Fu Panda – Master Monkey (Jackie Chan)
- 2008 – Madagascar: Escape 2 Africa – Makunga Alec Baldwin
- 2006 – Over the Hedge – RJ (Bruce Willis)
- 2004–2013 -24 – Jack Bauer (Kiefer Sutherland)
- 2003 – Finding Nemo – Marlin (Albert Brooks)
- 2002 – Look Who's Talking – Mikey (Bruce Willis)
- 2001 – Ally McBeal – Mark Albert (James Le Gros)
- 1997 – Friends – Pete Becker (Jon Favreau)
- 1992 – Back to the Future Part II – Biff Tannen (Thomas F. Wilson) (Cinema dubbing)
- 1991 – Back to the Future – Biff Tannen (Thomas F. Wilson) (Cinema dubbing)

== Decorations ==
Awarded by Czech Republic

- Medal of Merit (2024)
