= Shameless (2008 film) =

2008 Czech comedy film

- Film poster
- Czech: Nestyda
- Directed by: Jan Hřebejk
- Written by: Michal Viewegh; Jan Hřebejk; Jiří Macháček
- Produced by: Rudolf Biermann; Tomáš Hoffman
- Starring: Jiří Macháček; Emília Vášáryová; Simona Babčáková
- Cinematography: Jan Malíř
- Edited by: Vladimír Barák
- Production companies: IN Film, Infinity
- Distributed by: Falcon
- Release date: October 9, 2008
- Running time: 88 minutes
- Country: Czech Republic
- Language: Czech

Shameless (Czech: Nestyda), is a 2008 Czech comedy film directed by Jan Hřebejk. Following their collaborations on A Novel for Women and The Holiday Makers, Czech filmmaker Hřebejk and author Michal Viewegh reunited for Shameless, a comic romp based on Viewegh's bestselling Tales of Marriage and Sex. Overall, the film was a commercial success.

== Plot ==
Oskar (Jiří Macháček), a popular TV weather forecaster, suddenly wakes up to an altered sense of identity: rather than belonging to his easygoing wife Zuzana (a bewildered Simona Babčáková), he feels he ought to belong to the whole wide world – hence the national embarrassment. His first entanglement is with babysitter Kocicka (Eva Kerekéšová), a lean teenybopper who's more attached to her pet turtle than her older lover – at least until he accidentally smothers it in the dryer. Next in line is mature pop icon Nora (Emília Vášáryová), who's about to teach him a thing or two about freedom: the more people you let in, the more alone you end up feeling.

== Cast ==
- Jiří Macháček as Oskar
- Emília Vášáryová as Nora
- Simona Babčáková as Zuzana
- Pavel Liška as Matěj
- Nina Divíšková as Marta, Oskar's mother
- Pavel Landovský as Bedřich, Oskar's father
- Eva Kerekéšová as Kočička
- Martina Krátká as Simona
- Vojta Husa as Jakub
- Viktorie Fedorová as Terezka
- Roman Luknár as Nora's son
- Andy Hajdu as Nora's son
- Kryštof Mucha as Robert
- Marie Látová as Marie
- Miloš Pokorný as radio speaker
- Roman Ondráček as radio speaker
- Peter Kracík as TV7 chief
- Hana Seidlová as waitress
- Karla Mráčková as bell-frog
- Petra Eliáš-Voláková as bell-frog
- Adam Holý as photographer
- Renata Vajdáková as Matěj's wife

- Lukáš Příkazký as cop
- Štefan Capko as cop
- Tomáš Hanák as theatre actor
- Jiří Fero Burda as theatre actor
- Jiří Gajdošík as hotel director
- Ester Janečková as herself
- Halina Pawlovská as herself
- Přemek Podlaha as himself
- Milan Šteindler as himself
- Petr Čtvrtníček as himself
- Michal Viewegh as himself
- Martin Reiner as himself
- Hana Hegerová as herself
- Karel Gott as himself
- Petr Malásek as musician
- Zdeněk Fišer as musician
- Robert Balzar as musician
- František Kop as musician
