= Zuzana Bydžovská =

Czech actress

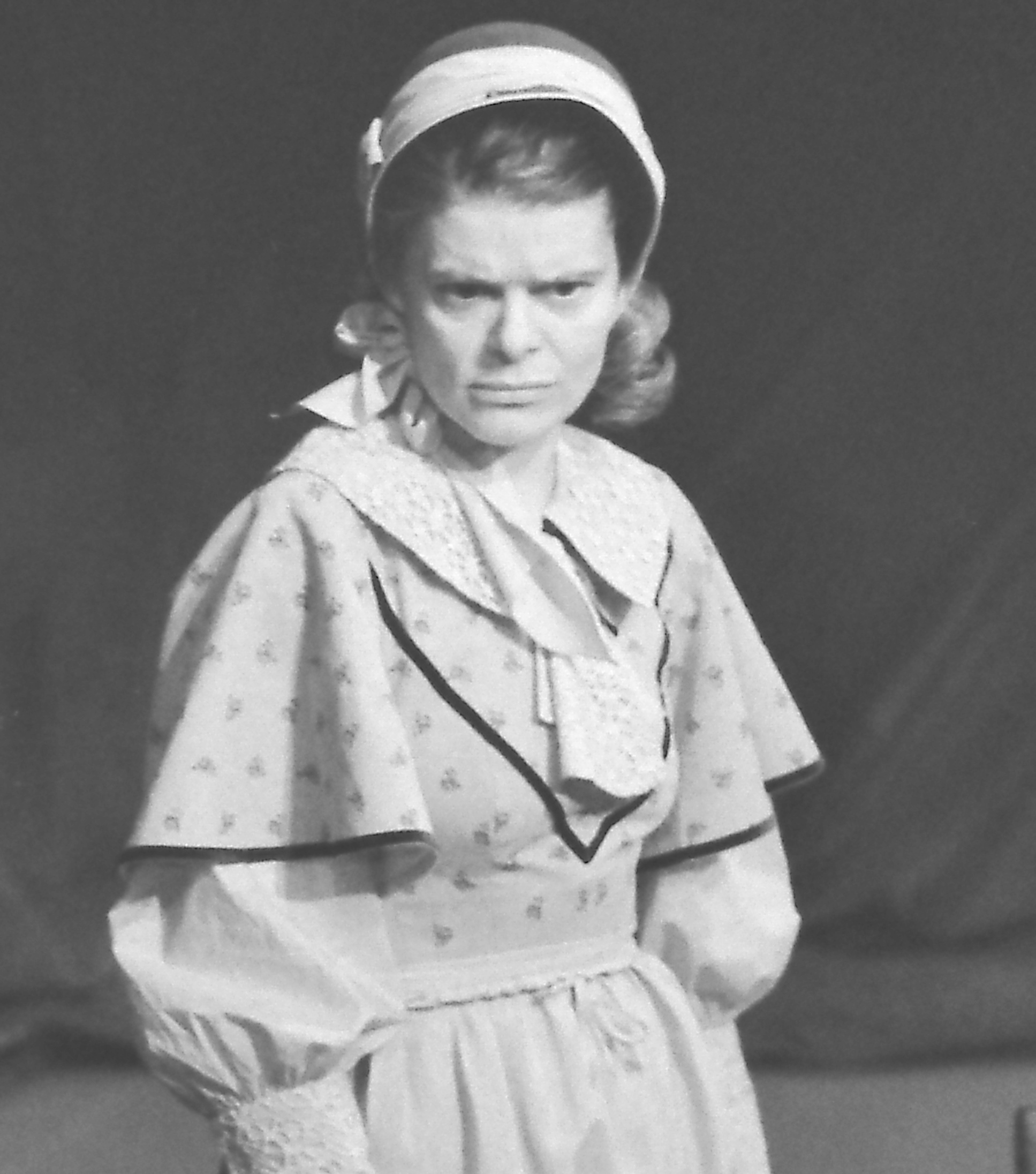
- Born: 10 October 1961 (age 64); Most, Czechoslovakia
- Occupation: Actress
- Years active: 1973–present

Zuzana Bydžovská (born 10 October 1961) is a Czech actress. She has performed in more than fifty films since 1973.

== Selected filmography ==
Film
| Year | Title | Role | Notes |
|---|---|---|---|
| 2015 | The Seven Ravens | Gabriela | |
| 2013 | Revival | Yvonne | |
| 2011 | Lidice | | |
| 2008 | The Country Teacher | | |
| 2007 | Gympl | | |
| 2005 | Wrong Side Up | | |
| 2000 | Wild Flowers | | |
| 1997 | Buttoners | | |
| 1983 | A Thousand-year-old Bee | | |

TV
| Year | Title | Role | Notes |
|---|---|---|---|
| 2011 | Organised Crime Unit | | |
| 2008 | Comeback | | |
| 1996 | Hospoda | | |

== Awards ==
| Year | Nominated work | Award | Category | Result |
|---|---|---|---|---|
| 2008 | Gympl | Czech Lion | Best Supporting Actress | Won |
| 2008 | Venkovský učitel | Stockholm International Film Festival | Best Actress | Won |
| 2009 | Venkovský učitel | Czech Lion | Best Actress | Won |
| 2011 | Mamas & Papas | Czech Lion | Best Actress | Won |
| 2012 | Perfect Days - I ženy mají své dny | Czech Lion | Best Supporting Actress | Nominated |
| 2013 | Revival | Czech Lion | Best Actress | Nominated |
