= Želary =

2003 Czech/Slovak film

- U.S. poster
- Directed by: Ondřej Trojan
- Written by: Květa Legátová (novel); Petr Jarchovský
- Starring: Anna Geislerová; György Cserhalmi
- Distributed by: Sony Pictures Classics (US), Falcon (Czech Republic)
- Release date: September 4, 2003
- Running time: 150 minutes
- Countries: Czech Republic; Slovakia
- Languages: Czech; Russian; German; English
- Budget: 50,000,000 CZK
- Box office: 43,881,284 CZK

Želary is a 2003 Czech/Slovak film directed by Ondřej Trojan and starring Anna Geislerová. The film received a 2004 Academy Award nomination in the Best Foreign Language Film category. It was produced by Barrandov Studios in Prague.

The film is adapted from two works by Czech novelist Květa Legátová - "Želary", a collection of short stories published in 2001, and her 2002 book, "Jozova Hanule".

== Plot ==
In the 1940s Protectorate of Bohemia and Moravia, Eliška is a nurse who works alongside her lover, Richard, a respected surgeon. They are part of an underground resistance network that has formed to help those in danger of persecution from the Nazis. Eliška acts as a messenger.

One night, Richard responds to an emergency call to a patient needing a risky operation. Because she has the same blood type, Eliška gives blood for the transfusion. Days later, she arrives at Richard's apartment to find their friend, Slávek, with news that the Gestapo has apprehended two of their members, putting everyone at risk of discovery. Eliška is told that Richard has emigrated, leaving papers for her to assume a new identity. Slávek says that she must leave the city with a man named Joza - the patient who had received the transfusion. Seeing no alternative, Eliška - now Hana - leaves for the countryside.

As a mountain-dweller, Joza appears uncouth and disheveled, but he is kind and considerate to her plight. He provides her with temporary refuge in a small village, where she quickly becomes the object of curiosity. Some, such as Teacher Tkáč the schoolmaster, are xenophobic and suspicious. The Nazis have killed anyone harbouring enemies. Eliška tries to leave, but the village doctor reveals that the Nazis have executed Slávek. He tells her that to remain safe, she must marry Joza and live with him in the mountain village of Želary.

Initially, Eliška is reluctant. Joza takes her to their new home, a small cottage with no electricity, dirt floor, and a fly-infested outhouse. On the day of their wedding, Eliška rebels, but relents upon Joza's explanation that the villagers will not accept a strange, single woman. So Eliška agrees, and the two are married. At the wedding, she meets most of Želary's inhabitants. Helenka is a young girl who lives near Joza and Eliška with her mother, Žeňa. Her best friend is Lipka, a boy whom the villagers treat as an outcast, but who is actually homeless due to his step-father Michal's dislike of him. He survives through the goodwill of Žeňa, Lucka the village midwife, and Old Goreik, an elderly gentleman who lives with his daughter-in-law, Marie, a victim of spousal abuse.

Eliška seems ill-suited to rural life. She finds the villagers' behavior raucous and crude, and is particularly repulsed by Michal, the drunk, who makes unwanted advances. As time passes, Joza's patience and Žeňa's gentle guidance help her to assimilate. Despite this, Eliška remains wary of her husband, until one evening when she breaks their only lamp and fears a beating. On the contrary, Joza is comforting and gives her a gift: a stack of books that she may like. One day, he takes her to his mother's grave and Eliška is moved by the love and kindness he feels. Joza falls in love with Eliška and she with him, leading to the consummation of their marriage.

Years pass and Eliška - called Hanula by the villagers and Hanulka by Joza - bears witness to a number of incidents. The Nazis, though scarce in Želary, kill an entire family for harbouring partisans, and then murder an innocent man in front of everyone. Eliška fears that the Gestapo will find her. Michal attempts to rape her at the saw mill. Helenka witnesses the attack and alerts Joza, who beats Michal and breaks his arm. His parents, the Kutinas, then force Michal's pregnant wife and Lipka's mother, Aninka, to do all the farm work, which leads to her miscarrying. Lipka alerts Eliška, Lucka, and Žeňa, but it is too late. Aninka's death destroys Michal's reputation and redeems Lipka in the eyes of the villagers.

By the spring of 1945, Eliška is a nurse again, and learns the art of herbal healing from Lucka. The old woman divulges that Marie and her father-in-law, Old Goreik, are expecting a child. Following the birth, soldiers from the Red Army arrive with news that the war is over. After a night of celebration, Joza reminds Eliška that she is free to leave (their marriage being technically invalid). Eliška replies that she wants to stay with him always, and falls asleep on the mountain in Joza's arms.

Young Goreik, furious over his father's relationship with his wife, arrives at Old Goreik's home with a drunken soldier who he persuades to rape Marie. Old Goreik arrives and shoots his son, as well as the would-be rapist, but the latter's brother arrives and shoots him. Intoxicated, the soldiers interpret the killing as the act of fascists and shoot at the villagers. With help from Lipka, many escape by crossing a swamp towards an old saw mill, where Lucka and Eliška tend to the wounded. Joza races back and forth between the haven and the village, and rescues several people - including Michal. Meanwhile, the soldiers kill the village priest and rape Žeňa. Vojta, a farmhand, comes to her aid and Joza goes back to rescue him. The next morning, they arrive at the saw mill and find soldiers heading in the same direction. The villagers are relieved, but Joza collapses (Vojta having shot him earlier after mistaking him for the enemy). Devastated, Eliška kneels beside Joza's lifeless body and weeps.

Years later, Želary is virtually abandoned due to modernisation of the town below. Eliška, now with Richard, returns to visit the mountains and the cottage that she had shared with Joza. Lucka emerges from the ruins and is shocked to see Hanula, but remembers that "nothing disappears off the mountain, there’s always tracks". Astounded, Eliška asks if it is possible that Lucka is still alive, to which Lucka responds, "I'm none too sure. I'm none too sure at all." On the top of the mountain, the women laugh.

== Cast ==
- Anna Geislerová as Eliška / Hanulka: a young nurse who leaves city-life behind when the Gestapo catch wind of the resistance. She marries Joza and comes to live with him in Želary. At first, she finds it difficult to adapt to country life, but toughens and eventually grows to love her husband and life on the mountain.
- György Cserhalmi as Joza: a mill worker who suffers a freak accident and meets Eliška for the first time when she donates her blood to him. At first, Joza appears dull and rough-shod, but is actually a strong worker and a loyal friend to those who know him. He marries Eliška to keep the villagers from being suspicious about her presence, but falls in love with her in the course of their marriage.
- Jaroslava Adamová as Lucka: the village midwife. Eccentric and outspoken, Lucka is a link between all the inhabitants of Želary and knows everything there is to know about their daily lives.
- Iva Bittová as Žeňa: Joza and Eliška's neighbor. Žeňa is a widow who lives alone with her young daughter, Helenka. She helps Eliška to become accustomed to country-living and enjoys the self-sufficiency of a single life.
- Anna Vertelárová as Helenka: Žeňa's daughter and Lipka's closest friend. Although young, she is sharp and quick to the point. Her initial presence during several disasters turns her into a human distress signal of sorts keeping Želary alert to danger.
- Tomáš Žatečka as Lipka: a young boy whose mother, Aninka, is married to Michal, the village drunk. Lipka ends up living in the woods as an outcast when Michal throws him out and must rely on the kindness of the villagers to survive. Lipka is also Helenka's “milk brother,” Žeňa having nursed him when his own mother, Aninka, was unable. At the end of the film, he plays an essential role in saving the villagers from the wrath of the Red Army soldiers.
- Ondřej Koval as Michal Kutina: Lipka's step-father and a raging alcoholic. Irascible and shameless, he is the only person in Želary who openly voices his suspicion of Eliška. When she rebuffs his advances, Michal tries to rape her, but is caught and beaten.
- Tatiana Vajdová as Aninka Kutina: Lipka's mother and Michal's wife. When Joza maims her husband, she is forced to do all the work on their farm. This leads to a miscarriage resulting in her death.
- František Velecký and Viera Pavliková as Mr. and Mrs. Kutina: Michal's parents who refuse to acknowledge his violent behavior. When Aninka lies dying from a miscarriage, they neglect to call the doctor for hours. Her death brings them the shame and ire of the villagers.
- Edita Malovcic and Jan Tříska as Marie and Old Goreik: daughter-in-law and father-in-law. Marie comes to live with Goreik to escape her husband's abuse. They begin a romantic relationship which results in the birth of a son.
- Michal Hofbauer as Young Goreik: Old Goreik's son and Marie's husband. In trying to get revenge from his wife and father, his actions bring harm to the whole village.
- Miroslav Donutil as the priest: the Catholic priest who marries Joza and Eliška. He is one of only a few people who know why she has come to Želary.
- Jaroslav Dušek as Teacher Tkáč: the village schoolmaster. At the beginning of the film, he is heavy-handed and dictatorial, but softens with the help of the priest.
- Juraj Hrčka as Vojta Juriga: a farmhand who is in love with Žeňa.
- Ivan Trojan as Richard: a surgeon and Eliška's lover before she moves to Želary.
- Jan Hrušínský as Slávek: a doctor and a mutual friend of Richard and Eliška. When the Gestapo find out about the resistance, he tells Eliška that she must leave with Joza to escape detection. He dies at the hands of the Nazis.

== Location ==
The film was mostly shot on location in the Malá Fatra mountains in the Northwest region of the Slovak Republic.

== Awards ==
=== Won ===
- 2005 Bangkok International Film Festival - Golden Kinnaree Award for Best Actress (Anna Geislerová)
- Czech Lion - Best Actress (Anna Geislerová)
- Czech Lion - Best Sound
- Undine Awards - Best Young Actress (Anna Geislerová)

=== Nominated ===
- 76th Academy Awards for Best Foreign Language Film (Czech)
- 2005 Bangkok International Film Festival - Golden Kinnaree Award for Best Film (Ondrej Trojan)
- Czech Lion - Best Actor (György Cserhalmi)
- Czech Lion - Best Art Direction
- Czech Lion - Best Cinematography
- Czech Lion - Best Director
- Czech Lion - Best Editing
- Czech Lion - Best Film
- Czech Lion - Best Music
- Czech Lion - Best Screenplay
- Czech Lion - Best Supporting Actress (Jaroslava Adamová)

== Reception ==
On review aggregator Rotten Tomatoes the film has a score of 73% based on 51 reviews, with an average rating of 6.7 out of 10. The website's critical consensus states, "Zelary is a satisfyingly old-fashioned romance with an epic sweep". Metacritic gave the film 66 out of 100 based on reviews from 20 critics, indicating "generally favorable reviews".
