= The Country Teacher =

- Directed by: Bohdan Sláma
- Starring: Pavel Liška; Zuzana Bydzovská
- Cinematography: Divis Marek
- Music by: Vladimír Godár
- Release date: 20 March 2008
- Running time: 117 minutes
- Country: Czech Republic
- Language: Czech

The Country Teacher (Czech: Venkovský učitel) is a 2008 Czech drama film directed and written by Bohdan Sláma.

== Cast ==
- Pavel Liška – Teacher
- Zuzana Bydžovská – Marie
- Ladislav Šedivý – Boy
- Marek Daniel – Boyfriend
- Tereza Voříšková – Beruska
- Cyril Drozda - Headmaster
- Marie Ludvíková - Headmaster's wife
- Zuzana Kronerová - Mother
- Miroslav Krobot - Father
