= Pavel Liška =

Czech actor

- Liška in 2022
- Born: 29 January 1972 (age 54); Liberec, Czechoslovakia
- Occupation: Actor
- Years active: 1997–present
- Spouse: Kristýna Boková (2002–2013)

Pavel Liška (born 29 January 1972) is a Czech actor. He has appeared in more than fifty films since 1997.

== Selected filmography ==
Year	Title	Role	Notes
1999	The Idiot Returns	Frantisek	
2004	Up and Down	Eman	
2005	Something Like Happiness	Toník	
2005	Lunacy	Jean Berlot	
2008	The Country Teacher		
2008	Shameless		
2016	Green Horse Rustlers		
