= The Karamazov Brothers (film) =

- Directed by: Petr Zelenka
- Written by: Petr Zelenka
- Produced by: Cestmír Kopecký
- Starring: Ivan Trojan; David Novotný; Igor Chmela; Martin Myšička; Radek Holub
- Cinematography: Alexander Surkala
- Edited by: Vladimír Barák
- Music by: Jan A. P. Kaczmarek
- Release date: April 24, 2008
- Running time: 100 minutes
- Country: Czech Republic
- Languages: Czech; Polish
- Budget: 12,000,000 Czech koruna (€480,000)

The Karamazov Brothers (Czech: Karamazovi) is a 2008 Czech film directed by Petr Zelenka, with a soundtrack by Jan A. P. Kaczmarek.

== Plot summary ==
The film tells the story of a group of Czech actors who come to Polish steelworks to perform a stage adaptation of Fyodor Dostoevsky's 1880 novel The Brothers Karamazov at an alternative drama festival. As rehearsals get under way, we follow not only the emotional story examining issues of faith, immortality, and the salvation of the human soul, but also the relationships within the acting troupe itself, which strangely reflect Dostoevsky's "great" themes. The stage drama is transferred to the real world when a tragedy occurs during rehearsal involving one of the spectators.

== Cast ==
- Michaela Badinková as Katya
- Igor Chmela as Ivan Karamazov
- Radek Holub as Smerdyakov
- Lenka Krobotová as Grushenka
- David Novotný as Dmitriy Karamazov
- Ivan Trojan as Stary Karamazov
- Martin Myšička as Alyosha Karamazov
- Jerzy Michal Bozyk as Pianist
- Malgorzata Galkowska

== Awards and recognition ==
Karamazovi won the International Federation of Film Critics (FIPRESCI) award in Karlovy Vary International Film Festival in 2008 and was submitted by The Czech Republic for the 2009 Academy Award for Best Foreign Film.

== See also ==
- Bratya Karamazovy, a 1969 Soviet adaptation of the same novel
