= Anna Geislerová =

Czech actress

- Geislerová in 2025
- Born: 17 April 1976 (age 50); Prague, Czechoslovakia
- Occupation: Actress
- Years active: 1990–present
- Spouse: Zdeněk Janáček
- Children: 3

Anna Geislerová is a Czech actress. The recipient of five Czech Lion awards, three for Best Leading Actress and a further two for Best Supporting Actress, Geislerová is best known for her role of Eliška in the Academy Award-nominated movie Želary (2003) and as Anna in The Idiot Returns (1999).

== Career ==
Born in Prague in 1976, Geislerová's rise to fame began at the age of 14 when she landed the leading role in Filip Renč's Requiem pro panenku (1991). Her numerous acting credits include Jan Svěrák's Jízda in 1994 as well as the film adaptation of Michal Viewegh's acclaimed novel Výchova dívek v Čechách (1997).

Geislerová has won multiple Czech Lion awards. She won Best Supporting Actress in 2000 for her performance in Saša Gedeon's The Idiot Returns, before winning Best Leading Actress in 2004 for Ondřej Trojan's Želary, which was also nominated for the Academy Award for Best Foreign Language Film. In 2006 Geislerová again won a Czech Lion, this time for Best Supporting Actress in the film Something Like Happiness. The following year she won a Best Leading Actress Czech Lion for her performance in Kráska v nesnázích. She received her fifth Czech Lion award overall, after winning Best Leading Actress at the 2012 ceremony, for Innocence directed by Jan Hřebejk.

In 2004, she was named one as European films' Shooting Stars by European Film Promotion.

Geislerová is part of the Shooting Stars jury 2010, which selected 10 European up-and-coming actors from the group of nominees for receiving the Shooting Star Award 2010 in February at the Berlin International Film Festival.

== Personal life ==
Geislerová has three children from her former marriage to Zdeněk Janáček, a daughter Stella, and sons Bruno and Max. She has two sisters, Lenka and Ester; and her aunt Zuzana is also an actress.

== Filmography ==
Year	Title	Role
1990	Pějme píseň dohola	Tráva
1991	Requiem pro panenku	Marika
1992	Přítelkyně z domu smutku	Líba
1992	Fantaghirò 2	Queen of the Elves
1993	Fantaghirò 3	Queen of the Elves
1994	Jízda	Anna
1997	Výchova dívek v Čechách	Beáta
1999	The Idiot Returns	Anna
2000	Kytice	Dornička / Háta
2003	Želary	Eliška
2005	Something Like Happiness	Dáša
2005	Lunacy	Charlotte
2005	Sklapni a zastřel mě	Líba Zemanová
2006	Kráska v nesnázích	Marcela
2007	Medvídek	Anna
2008	Smutek paní Šnajderové	Mrs. Šnajderová
2009	The Case of Unfaithful Klara	Professor Smidt
2010	Občanský průkaz	Petra
2011	Nevinnost	Lída
2013	Honeymoon	Tereza
2014	Fair Play	Irena
2014	Až po uši	Šárka
2014	Pohádkář	Dana
2016	Anthropoid	Lenka Fafková
2016	Polednice	Eliška
2016	Já, Mattoni	Marie Löschnerová
2016	Pohádky pro Emu	Marie Urbanová
2017	Zahradnictví: Rodinný přítel	Vilma
2017	Zahradnictví: Dezertér	Vilma
2017	Zahradnictví: Nápadník	Vilma
2017	Milada	Ludmila Brožová
2018	The Catcher Was a Spy	Rathe
2019	The Sleepers	member of the committee
2019	Amnestie	Kelemenová
2020	Havel	Olga Havlová
2020	Božena Němcová	Božena Němcová
2022	The Ipcress File	Dr. Polina Lavotchkin
2025	Caravan	Ester
2026	Only Beautiful Things to Look At	Ingrid
TBA	The Knife Thrower †	Magda Frybová

== Awards ==
Year	Award	Category	Nominated work	Result
1995	Czech Lion Awards	Best Actress	Jízda	Nominated
2000	Czech Lion Awards	Best Supporting Actress	Návrat idiota	Won
2000	BAFICI Awards	Best Actress	Návrat idiota	Won^{[A]}
2004	Undine Awards	Best Young Actress in the New European Union Countries	Želary	Won
2004	Czech Lion Awards	Best Actress	Želary	Won
2005	Golden Kinnaree Awards	Best Actress	Želary	Won^{[B]}
2005	Silver Seashell Awards	Best Actress	Štěstí	Won
2006	Czech Lion Awards	Best Supporting Actress	Štěstí	Won
2006	Sun in a Net Awards	Best Actress	Šílení	Won
2007	Czech Lion Awards	Best Actress	Kráska v nesnázích	Won
2008	Czech Lion Awards	Best Supporting Actress	Medvídek	Nominated
2011	Czech Lion Awards	Best Actress	Občanský průkaz	Nominated
2011	Czech Film Critics' Awards	Best Actress	Nevinnost	Won
2012	Czech Lion Awards	Best Actress	Nevinnost	Won
2013	Czech Lion Awards	Best Actress	Líbánky	Nominated
2014	Czech Lion Awards	Best Supporting Actress	Fair Play	Nominated

Notes

- A Award shared with co-star Tatiana Vilhelmová for her role of Olga in the same movie by Saša Gedeon.
- B Award shared with Annette Bening for her role of Julia Lambert in Being Julia (2004) directed by István Szabó.

== Recognition ==
- Medal of Merit (2025)
