= Summer Shakespeare Festival =

Theatre festival in Prague, Czechia

Coordinates: 50°5′31.23″N 14°24′15.72″E

Official poster for 2004 festival: Zuzana Vejvodová (Juliet) and Jiří Hájek (Romeo)

The Summer Shakespeare Festival (Czech: Letní shakespearovské slavnosti, Slovak: Letné shakespearovské slávnosti) takes place in the courtyard of Burgrave Palace at Prague Castle. The festival was originally initiated by Václav Havel. The performances are also presented at Špilberk in Brno and at Bratislava Castle in Bratislava. The organizers closely cooperate with Martin Hilský, who translated most of the staged plays.

So far, the most acclaimed was the performance of King Lear in 2002. In 2004, director Martin Huba was selected for an ambitious project, a performance of Romeo and Juliet such as that one evening Capulets would be Slovaks and Monteks Czechs and the next day vice versa. The project failed, Huba said to the media that even though the dialogs translated by Ľubomír Feldek and Martin Hilský were perfect, they somehow did not fit together. In the end, the only Slovak-speaking character was the Nurse, performed by Emília Vášáryová.

== Selected performances ==
- 2002 – King Lear (Lear: Jan Tříska, directed by Martin Huba)
- 2003 – Hamlet (Hamlet: Jiří Langmajer, directed by Lucie Bělohradská)
- 2004 – Romeo and Juliet (Romeo: Jiří Hájek / Ladislav Hampl, Juliet: Kateřina Čapková / Zuzana Vejvodová, Nurse: Emília Vášáryová, directed by Martin Huba)
- 2005 – Twelfth Night, or What You Will (Viola: Jitka Schneiderová / Zuzana Vejvodová, Olivia: Linda Rybová / Hana Ševčíková, Feste: Jiří Langmajer / Miroslav Táborský, Malvolio: Alois Švehlík / Jan Vlasák, directed by Viktor Polesný)
- 2006 – Othello (Othello: Michal Dlouhý / Martin Zahálka, Iago: Oldřich Navrátil, Desdemona: Lucie Vondráčková / Zuzana Vejvodová, directed by Petr Kracik)

== See also ==
- Designblok
