= The Idiot Returns =

- Directed by: Saša Gedeon
- Written by: Saša Gedeon
- Based on: The Idiot by Fyodor Dostoevsky
- Produced by: Petr Oukropec; Čestmír Kopecký
- Starring: Pavel Liška; Aňa Geislerová; Tatiana Vilhelmová
- Cinematography: Štěpán Kučera
- Edited by: Petr Turyna
- Music by: Vladimír Godár
- Distributed by: Cinemart, a. s.
- Release date: 25 February 1999
- Running time: 99 minutes
- Country: Czech Republic
- Language: Czech

The Idiot Returns (Czech: Návrat idiota; also released as Return of the Idiot) is a 1999 Czech film directed by Saša Gedeon. The movie is loosely based on The Idiot by Fyodor Dostoevsky. It was the Czech Republic's submission to the 72nd Academy Awards for the Academy Award for Best Foreign Language Film, but was not accepted as a nominee.

== Plot ==
František returns from a mental institution where he spent most of his life. He meets Anna, and later her lovers Emil and Robert, and her sister Olga.

== Cast ==
- Pavel Liška as František
- Anna Geislerová as Anna
- Tatiana Vilhelmová as Olga
- Jiří Langmajer as Emil
- Jiří Macháček as Robert
- Zdena Hadrbolcová as Emil's and Robert's mother
- Jitka Smutná as Anna and Olga's mother
- Pavel Marek as Krtek
- Anna Polívková as Girl at dancing lessons

== Awards ==
- 1999 Czech Lion Award for Best Film
- 1999 Czech Lion Award for Best Screenplay - Saša Gedeon
- 1999 Czech Lion Award for Best Director - Saša Gedeon
- 1999 Czech Lion Award for Best Supporting Actress - Anna Geislerová
- 1999 Czech Lion Award for Best Music - Vladimír Godár
- 2000 Best Actress at Buenos Aires International Festival of Independent Cinema - Anna Geislerová and Tatiana Vilhelmová
- 2000 Best Screenplay at Buenos Aires International Festival of Independent Cinema - Saša Gedeon
- 1999 International Jury Award at São Paulo International Film Festival - Saša Gedeon

== See also ==
- List of submissions to the 72nd Academy Awards for Best Foreign Language Film
- List of Czech submissions for the Academy Award for Best Foreign Language Film
