= Something Like Happiness =

2005 Czech film by Bohdan Sláma

Something Like Happiness Štěstí
- Directed by: Bohdan Sláma
- Starring: Anna Geislerová; Tatiana Vilhelmová; Pavel Liška
- Music by: Leonid Soybelman
- Release date: 29 July 2005
- Running time: 110 minutes
- Countries: Czech Republic; Germany
- Language: Czech

Something Like Happiness (Czech title: Štěstí ) is a 2005 Czech film directed by Bohdan Sláma. It is about finding hope in the midst of disappointment by three young people who grew up in the same run-down block of flats and are now coming of age. The film won the Golden Seashell at the 2005 San Sebastian Film Festival.

== Cast ==
- Anna Geislerová - Dasha
- Pavel Liška - Toník
- Tatiana Vilhelmová - Monika
- Marek Daniel - Jára
- Zuzana Kronerová - Teta
- Vanda Hybnerová - Ženuška

== Awards ==
- Seven Czech Lions (2005)
- Golden Seashell at the 2005 San Sebastian Film Festival
