= Martin Huba =

Slovak actor

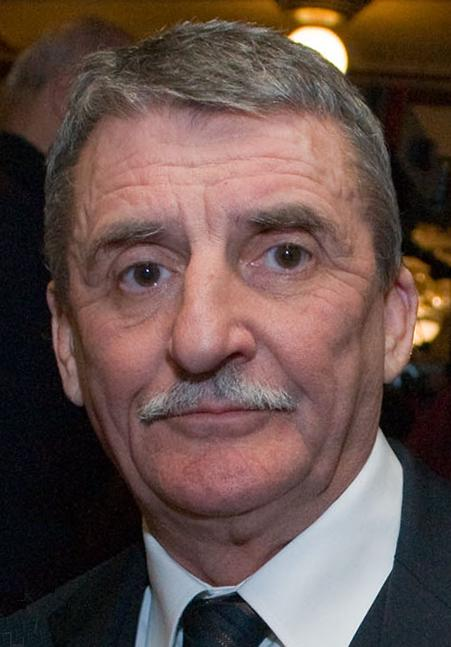
- Huba, 2010
- Born: 16 July 1943 (age 82); Bratislava, Czechoslovakia
- Occupation: Actor
- Years active: 1964–present

Martin Huba (born 16 July 1943 in Bratislava) is a Slovak actor and director on stage and in film.

In 1964 he graduated from the Academy of Performing Arts in Bratislava (VŠMU). He joined the Východoslovenské štátne divadlo (Košice State Theater) in Košice. In 1967 he moved to the theater Divadlo na Korze in Bratislava, where he remained till its closure in 1971. Since 1976 he has been a member of the Slovak National Theatre (SND).

Since the 1990s he has been directing theatre - he has directed in the Drama Theatre and Opera of the Slovak National Theatre in Bratislava and as part of the Summer Shakespeare Festival in Prague. He won the 2001 DOSKY Theatre Critics' Award for his direction of The Dancing Room.

== Selected stage performances - actor ==
- 1995: Isidoro in Čertice by Carlo Goldoni
- 1998: Bruscon in Der Theatermacher by Thomas Bernhard, Divadlo Na Zábradlí in Prague (received Alfréd Radok Award)
- 2004: Cyrano in Cyrano de Bergerac, SND
- 2005: Johannes Rosmer in Rosmersholm, Mahenovo divadlo Brno (nominated for Alfréd Radok Award)

== Selected stage performances - director ==
- 1995: Anton Pavlovich Chekhov: The Cherry Orchard; SND
- 1999: Agatha Christie: Desať malých černoškov alebo ...napokon už nezostal nik; Činohra SND
- 2001: Tančiareň; SND (received Dosky Award)
- 2002: William Shakespeare: King Lear; Summer Shakespeare festival at Prague Castle
- 2002: Ronald Harwood: The Dresser; Divadlo v Dlouhé in Prague
- 2004: William Shakespeare: Romeo and Juliet; Summer Shakespeare Festival at Prague Castle
- 2004: Juraj Beneš: The Players; SND
- 2006: Wolfgang Amadeus Mozart: The Marriage of Figaro; SND
