= Saša Gedeon =

Czech film director and screenwriter (born 1970)

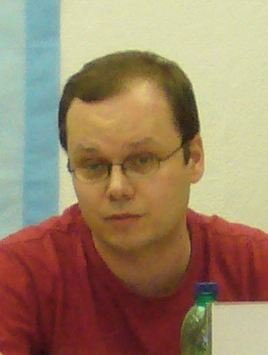
- Gedeon in 2011
- Born: 29 August 1970 (age 54); Prague, Czechoslovakia
- Occupations: Film director; screenwriter; actor
- Years active: 1986–present
- Known for: Indiánské léto, Návrat idiota

Saša Gedeon (born 29 August 1970) is a Czech film director, screenwriter, and actor. He graduated from the Film and TV School of the Academy of Performing Arts in Prague in 1995. That year, he won the Findling Award for his film Indiánské léto at the Cottbus Film Festival. His 1999 film, Návrat idiota, won him the São Paulo International Film Festival International Jury Award, as well as several Czech Lion Awards.

== Selected filmography ==
- Indiánské léto (1995)
- Návrat idiota (1999)
