= Buty =

Czech musical group

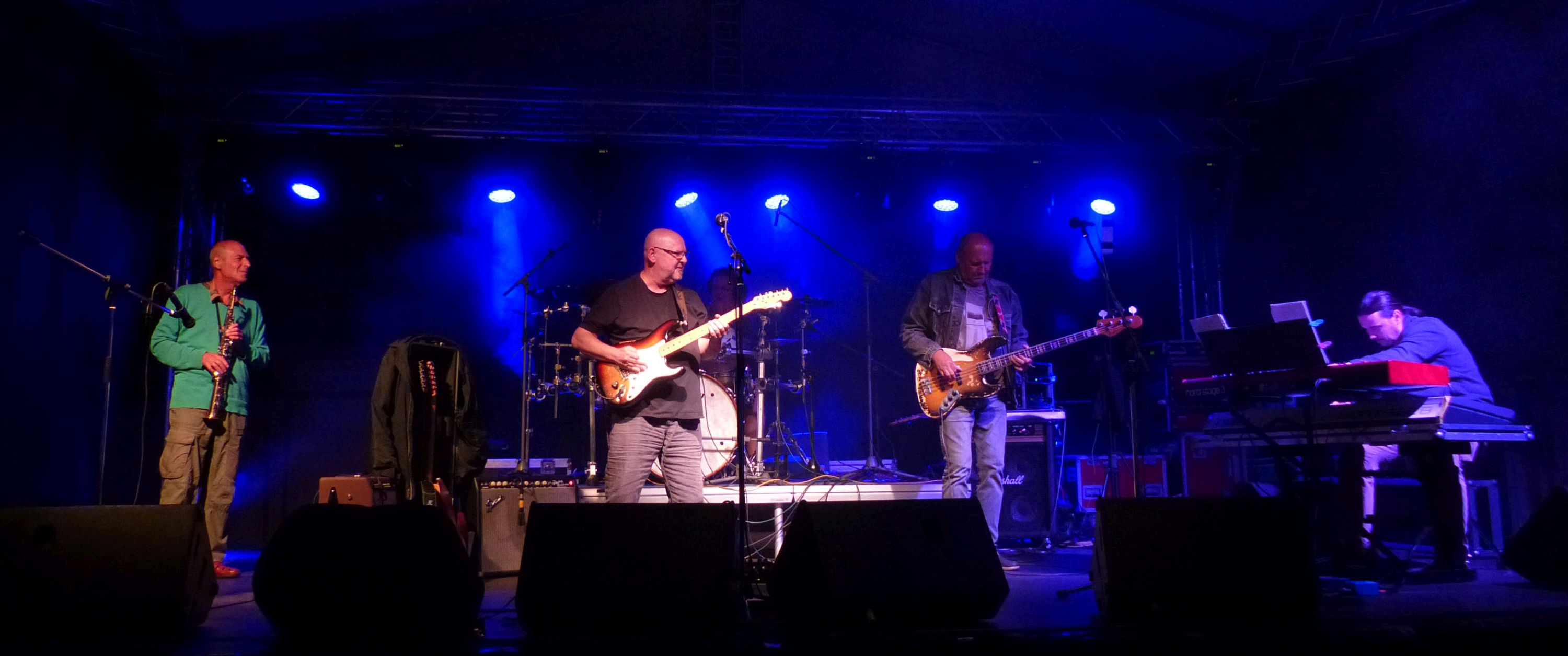
- Buty performing in 2021

Background information
- Origin: Ostrava, Czech Republic
- Genres: Pop; rock; folk; jazz; worldbeat
- Years active: 1986–present
- Labels: Sony BMG, Supraphon
- Members: Radek Pastrňák; Richard Kroczek; Petr Vavřík; Milan Straka; Vlastimil Šmída
- Past members: Ivan Myslikovjan; Luděk Piásečný; Vít Kučaj; Andrei Toader; Alan Švejk Hudeček; Marek Moroň; Milan Nytra; David Straka
- Website: buty.cz

Buty is a Czech music group originally from Ostrava, formed in 1986 by Richard Kroczek and Radek Pastrňák from the bands U238 and B komplex. The founding members were joined by Vít Kučaj, Ivan Myslikovjan, and Luděk Piásečný. The name of the group means "shoes" in the local dialect.

== Background and history ==
The group's musical style is eclectic, mixing rock and folk with other styles, including world music, country, jazz, reggae, and others. The group became popular in Czechoslovakia at the beginning of the 1990s, and their popularity peaked at the end of that decade, when their concerts attracted audiences of thousands and they were among the most popular bands in the country. Buty recorded music for Jízda, a 1994 road movie by Jan Svěrák, which also features the band leader Radek Pastrňák in one of the main roles; the band's album PPoommaalluu is partially a soundtrack for the movie.

== Band members ==
Current

- Radomír Pastrňák – lead guitar, vocals
- Richard Kroczek – drums
- Petr Vavřík – bass guitar
- Milan Straka – wind instruments
- Vlastimil Šmída – keyboards
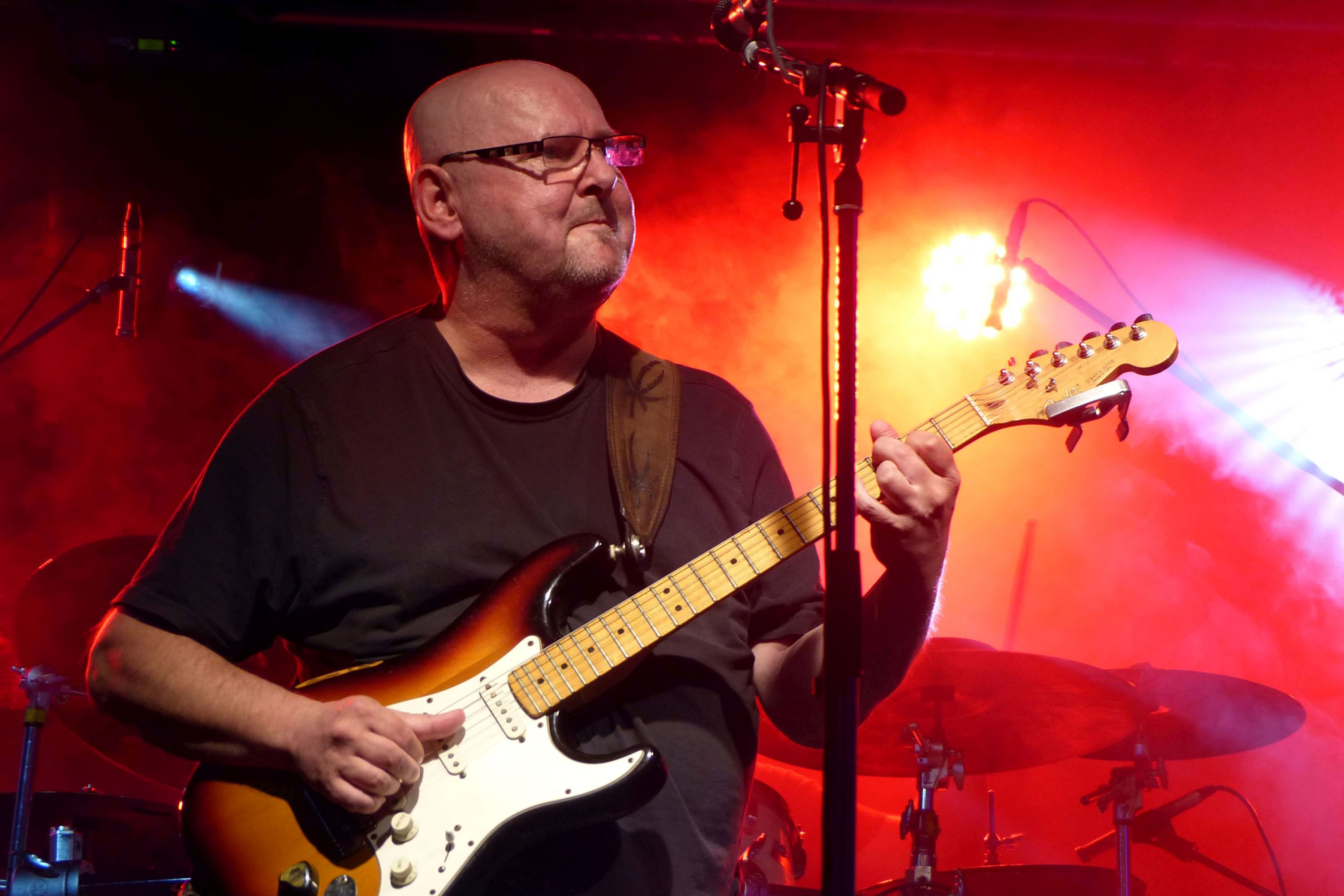
Radek Pastrňák

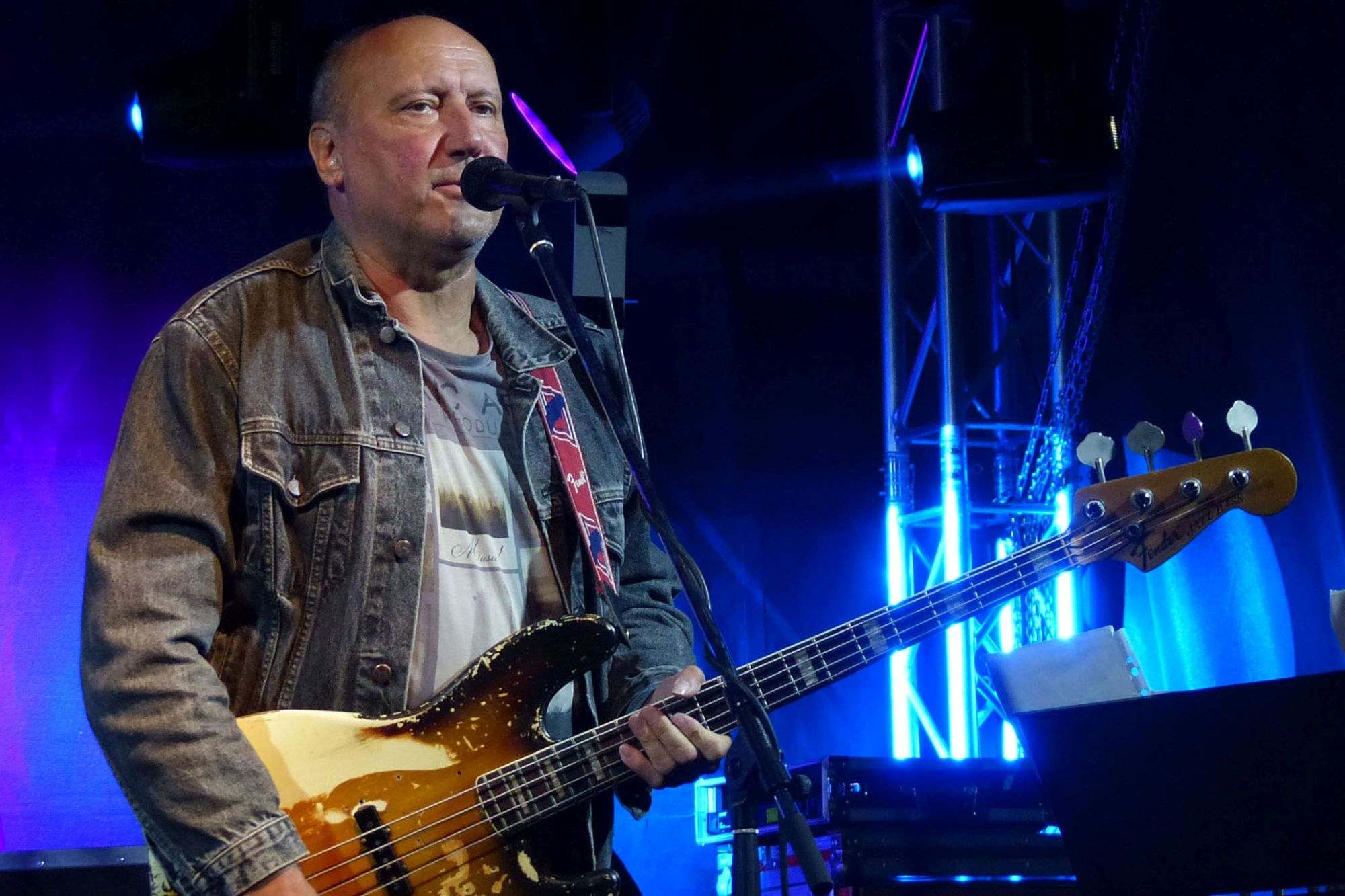
Petr Vavřík

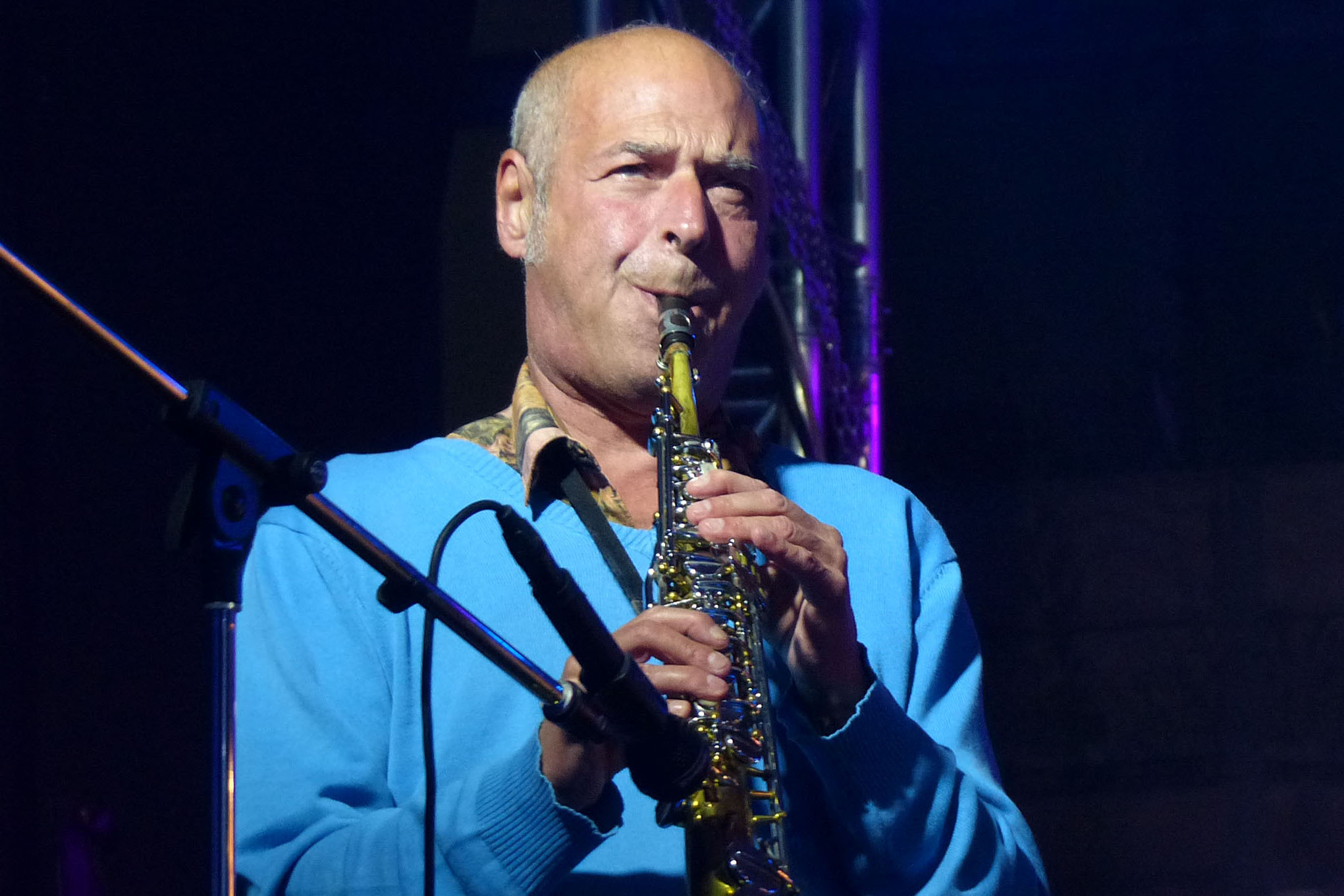
Milan Straka

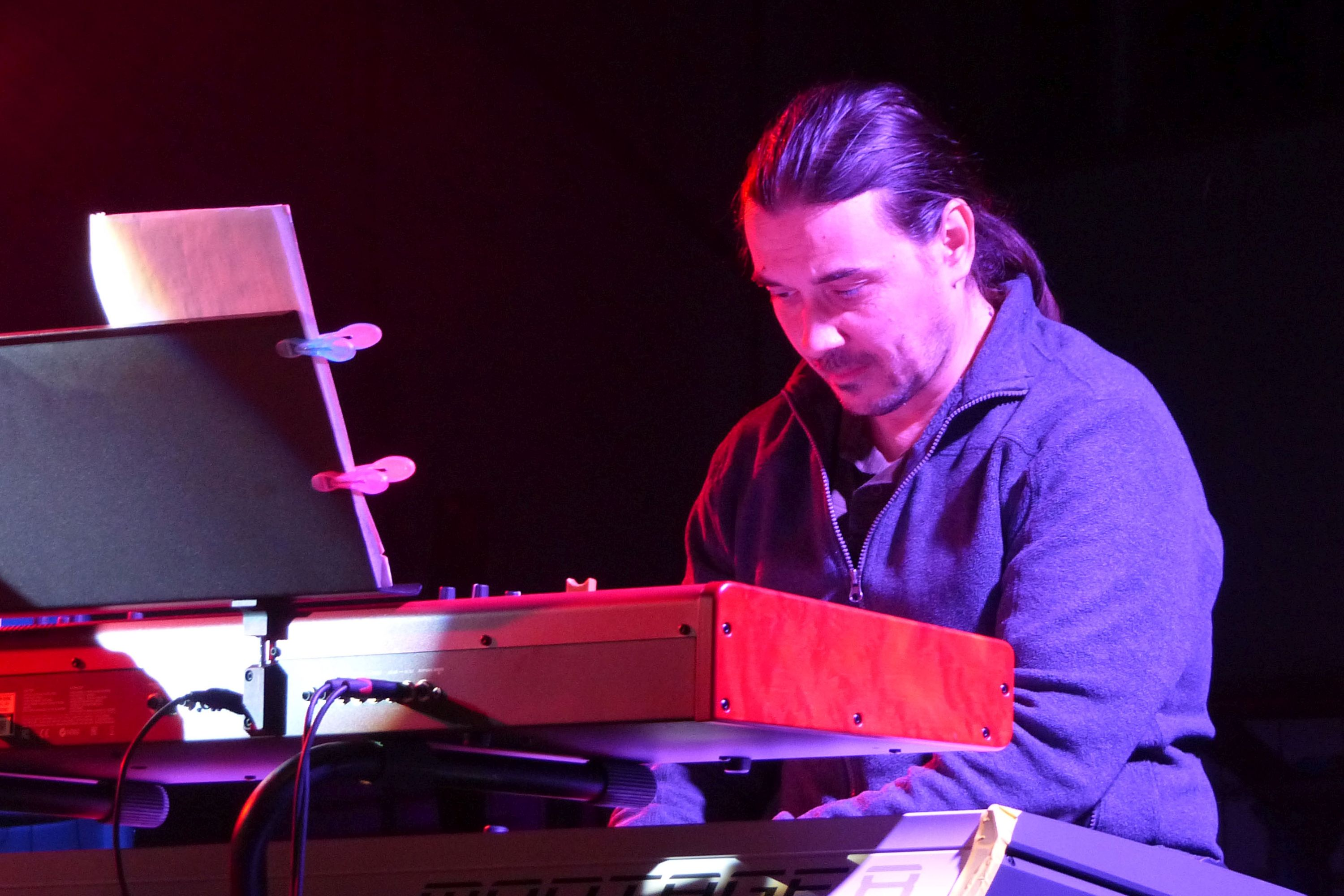
Vlastimil Šmída

Past

- Milan Nytra – keyboards
- Alan Švejk Hudeček – vocals
- Marek Moroň – vocals
- Ivan Myslikovjan
- Luděk Piásečný
- Vít Kučaj
- Andrei Toader
- David Straka

== Discography ==
Studio albums

- Pískej si, pískej (1992)
- Ppoommaalluu (1994)
- Dřevo (1995)
- Rastakayakwanna (1997)
- Kapradí (1999)
- Normale (2001)
- Votom (2006)
- Duperele (2012)

Compilations

- buTYKVAriát (2003)

Live albums

- Kosmostour 2000 (Live) (2000)

Soundtracks

- Jízda (Motion picture soundtrack – 1994)
- Tajnosti (Motion picture soundtrack – 2007)
- Mamas & Papas (Motion picture soundtrack – 2010)

Singles

- "Malinkého ptáčka" (1996)
- "Tata" (1999)

== Selected awards and nominations ==
- 1994 Czech Lion Awards for Jan Svěrák's Jízda
- 1995 Anděl Award for Best Band
- 1997 Anděl Award for Best Band
- 1999 Anděl Award for Best Band
- Nominated for 2007 Czech Lion Awards for Alice Nellis's Tajnosti.
- Nominated for 2010 Czech Lion Awards for Alice Nellis's Mamas & Papas
