= 1994 Czech Lion Awards =

Czech film award ceremony

2nd Czech Lion Awards
- Date: February 27, 1999
- Site: Lucerna, Prague
- Hosted by: Viktor Preiss

Highlights
- Best Picture: Thanks for Every New Morning
- Most awards: Thanks for Every New Morning
- Most nominations: Accumulator 1 (9)

Television coverage
- Network: Česká televize

The 1994 Czech Lion Awards ceremony was held on 3 March 1995.

== Winners and nominees ==
Best Film	Best Director
Thanks for Every New Morning	Milan Šteindler — Thanks for Every New Morning
Best Actor in a Leading Role	Best Actress in a Leading Role
Faust - Petr Čepek	Thanks for Every New Morning - Ivana Chýlková
Best Actor in a Supporting Role	Best Actress in a Supporting Role
America — Jiří Lábus	The Order — Jana Preissová
Best Screenplay	Best Editing
Thanks for Every New Morning - Halina Pawlowská	Accumulator 1 - Alois Fišárek
Design	Best Cinematography
Faust - Jan Švankmajer a Eva Švankmajerová	The Ride - F. A. Brabec
Music	Sound
The Ride - Radek Pastrňák and Buty	Faust - Ivo Špalj
Unique Contribution to Czech Film
Jan Švankmajer

=== Non-statutory Awards ===
Best Foreign Film	Most Popular Film
Forrest Gump	Accumulator 1
Worst Film	Cinema Readers' Award
Even Bigger Idiot Than We Had Hoped	Accumulator 1
