= List of accolades received by La Vie en Rose =

Accolades
Award	Wins	Nominations
Academy Awards	2	3
British Academy Film Awards	3	7
Critics Choice Movie Awards	0	2
Gold Derby Decade Awards	0	1
Gold Derby Awards	2	4
Golden Globe Awards	1	1
Satellite Awards	1	7
Screen Actors Guild Awards	0	1

Totals (Note: Certain award groups do not simply award one winner. They acknowledge several different recipients, have runners-up, and have third place. Since this is a specific recognition and is different from losing an award, runner-up mentions are considered wins in this award tally. For simplification and to avoid errors, each award in this list has been presumed to have had a prior nomination.)
- Wins: 36
- Nominations: 90

La Vie en Rose (literally Life in pink, French pronunciation: [la vi ɑ̃ ʁoz]; (Note: A literal translation of "La Vie en Rose" is "Life in Pink", a figurative reference to rose-colored glasses.) French: La Môme) (Note: La Môme refers to Piaf's nickname "La Môme Piaf" (meaning "baby sparrow, birdie, little sparrow")) is a 2007 French biographical musical film about the life of French singer Édith Piaf. The film was co-written and directed by Olivier Dahan, and stars Marion Cotillard as Piaf. The UK and US title La Vie en Rose comes from Piaf's signature song.

Cotillard's performance earned her several accolades including the Academy Award for Best Actress — marking the first time an Oscar had been given for a French-language role — the BAFTA Award for Best Actress in a Leading Role, the Golden Globe Award for Best Actress – Motion Picture Musical or Comedy and the César Award for Best Actress in a Leading Role for her performance. The film also won the Academy Award for Best Makeup, the BAFTA Award for Best Makeup, Costume Design, Film Music, four additional César Awards

== Accolades ==
Award	Date of ceremony	Category	Recipient(s)	Result	Ref.
Academy Awards	February 24, 2008	Best Actress	Marion Cotillard	Won	
Academy Awards	February 24, 2008	Best Makeup and Hairstyling	Didier Lavergne & Jan Archibald	Won	
Academy Awards	February 24, 2008	Best Costume Design	Marit Allen	Nominated	
African-American Film Critics Association	2007	Best Actress	Marion Cotillard	Nominated	
Alliance of Women Film Journalists	2007	Best Actress	Marion Cotillard	Nominated	
Berlin International Film Festival	2007	Golden Bear	Olivier Dahan	Nominated	
Boston Society of Film Critics Awards	December 11, 2007	Best Actress	Marion Cotillard	Won	
British Academy Film Awards	February 10, 2008	Best Actress	Marion Cotillard	Won	
British Academy Film Awards	February 10, 2008	Best Film Music	Christopher Gunning	Won	
British Academy Film Awards	February 10, 2008	Best Costume Design	Marit Allen	Won	
British Academy Film Awards	February 10, 2008	Best Production Design	Olivier Raoux	Nominated	
British Academy Film Awards	February 10, 2008	Best Makeup and Hairstyling	Didier Lavergne & Jan Archibald	Won	
British Academy Film Awards	February 10, 2008	Best Sound	Laurent Zeilig, Pascal Villard, Jean-Paul Hurier, Marc Doisne	Nominated	
British Academy Film Awards	February 10, 2008	Best Film Not in the English Language	La Vie en Rose	Nominated	
British Independent Film Awards	November, 2007	Best Foreign Independent Film	La Vie en Rose	Nominated	
Broadcast Film Critics Association Awards	7 January 2008	Best Actress	Marion Cotillard	Nominated	
Broadcast Film Critics Association Awards	7 January 2008	Best Foreign Language Film	La Vie en Rose	Nominated	
César Awards	February 22, 2008	Best Film	La Vie en Rose	Nominated	
César Awards	February 22, 2008	Best Director	Olivier Dahan	Nominated	
César Awards	February 22, 2008	Best Actress	Marion Cotillard	Won	
César Awards	February 22, 2008	Best Supporting Actor	Pascal Greggory	Nominated	
César Awards	February 22, 2008	Best Supporting Actress	Sylvie Testud	Nominated	
César Awards	February 22, 2008	Best Original Screenplay	Olivier Dahan	Nominated	
César Awards	February 22, 2008	Best Editing	Richard Marizy & Yves Beloniak	Nominated	
César Awards	February 22, 2008	Best Cinematography	Tetsuo Nagata	Won	
César Awards	February 22, 2008	Best Costume Design	Marit Allen	Won	
César Awards	February 22, 2008	Best Production Design	Olivier Raoux	Won	
César Awards	February 22, 2008	Best Sound	Laurent Zeilig, Pascal Villard, Jean-Paul Hurier, Marc Doisne	Won	
Chicago Film Critics Association Awards	December 13, 2007	Best Actress	Marion Cotillard	Nominated	
Chicago Film Critics Association Awards	December 13, 2007	Best Foreign Language Film	La Vie en Rose	Nominated	
Costume Designers Guild Awards	February 19, 2008	Excellence in Period Film	Marit Allen	Nominated	
Czech Lion Awards	March 1, 2008	Best Actress	Marion Cotillard	Won	
Czech Lion Awards	March 1, 2008	Best Music	Becky Bentham, Edouard Dubois, Christopher Gunning	Won	
Czech Lion Awards	March 1, 2008	Best Sound	Laurent Zeilig	Won	
Dallas-Fort Worth Film Critics Association Awards	2007	Best Actress	Marion Cotillard	Nominated	
Dallas-Fort Worth Film Critics Association Awards	2007	Best Foreign Language Film	La Vie en Rose	Nominated	
Detroit Film Critics Society Awards	2007	Best Actress	Marion Cotillard	Nominated	
Dublin Film Critics Circle Awards	2007	Best Actress	Marion Cotillard	Nominated	
Étoiles d'Or	2008	Best Actress	Marion Cotillard	Won	
European Film Awards	December 1, 2007	European Film	Alain Goldman	Nominated	
European Film Awards	December 1, 2007	European Actress	Marion Cotillard	Nominated	
European Film Awards	December 1, 2007	Prix d'Excellence (Excellence in Makeup)	Didier Lavergne	Won	
European Film Academy People's Choice Award	2007	Best European Film	Olivier Dahan	Nominated	
Globes de Cristal Awards	February 5, 2007	Best Film	Olivier Dahan	Nominated	
Globes de Cristal Awards	February 5, 2007	Best Actress	Marion Cotillard	Nominated	
Gold Derby Decade Awards	2010	Lead Actress of the Decade	Marion Cotillard	Nominated	
Gold Derby Awards	2008	Lead Actress	Marion Cotillard	Won	
Gold Derby Awards	2008	Costume Design	Marit Allen	Nominated	
Gold Derby Awards	2008	Makeup/Hair	Jan Archibald & Didier Lavergne	Won	
Gold Derby Awards	2008	Foreign Language Film	FRANCE	Nominated	
Golden Globe Awards	January 13, 2008	Best Actress – Motion Picture Comedy or Musical	Marion Cotillard	Won	
Hollywood Film Awards	2007	Actress of the Year	Marion Cotillard	Won	
Houston Film Critics Society Awards	January 3, 2008	Best Actress	Marion Cotillard	Nominated	
Houston Film Critics Society Awards	January 3, 2008	Best Foreign Language Film		Nominated	
London Critics Circle Film Awards	4 February 2009	Actress of the Year	Marion Cotillard	Won	
Los Angeles Film Critics Association Awards	December 9, 2007	Best Actress	Marion Cotillard	Won	
Lumière Awards	January 13, 2008	Best Film	Olivier Dahan	Nominated	
Lumière Awards	January 13, 2008	Best Director	Olivier Dahan	Nominated	
Lumière Awards	January 13, 2008	Best Actress	Marion Cotillard	Won	
National Board of Review	January 15, 2008	Top Five Foreign Films	La Vie en Rose	Nominated	
National Society of Film Critics Awards	January 5, 2008	Best Actress	Marion Cotillard	Nominated	
Online Film & Television Association	2008	Best Actress	Marion Cotillard	Nominated	
Online Film & Television Association	2008	Best Makeup and Hairstyling	Jan Archibald, Didier Lavergne, Matthew Smith, David White	Won	
Online Film & Television Association	2008	Most Cinematic Moment	"Non, Je ne Regrette Rien"	Nominated	
Online Film Critics Society Awards	January 8, 2008	Best Actress	Marion Cotillard	Nominated	
Online Film Critics Society Awards	January 8, 2008	Best Foreign Language Film	La Vie en Rose	Nominated	
Palm Springs International Film Festival	2008	Breakthrough Performance Award	Marion Cotillard	Won	
Prêmio Guarani	2008	Best Foreign Film	La Vie en Rose	Won	
Satellite Awards	December 16, 2007	Best Director	Olivier Dahan	Nominated	
Satellite Awards	December 16, 2007	Best Actress in a Motion Picture, Drama	Marion Cotillard	Won	
Satellite Awards	December 16, 2007	Best Actress in a Supporting Role, Drama	Emmanuelle Seigner	Nominated	
Satellite Awards	December 16, 2007	Best Motion Picture, Foreign Film	FRANCE	Nominated	
Satellite Awards	December 16, 2007	Best Film Editing	Richard Marizy	Nominated	
Satellite Awards	December 16, 2007	Best Costume Design	Marit Allen	Nominated	
Satellite Awards	December 16, 2007	Best Sound (Mixing & Editing)	Nikolas Javelle & Jean-Paul Hurier	Nominated	
Screen Actors Guild Awards	January 27, 2008	Outstanding Performance by a Female Actor in a Leading Role	Marion Cotillard	Nominated	
Seattle International Film Festival	2007	Best Actress	Marion Cotillard	Won	
SESC Film Festival	2008	Best Foreign Actress (Audience Award)	Marion Cotillard	Won	
SESC Film Festival	2008	Best Foreign Actress (Critics Award)	Marion Cotillard	Won	
Southeastern Film Critics Association Award	2007	Best Foreign Language Film	La Vie en Rose	Nominated	
St. Louis Film Critics Association	December 24, 2007	Best Actress	Marion Cotillard	Nominated	
St. Louis Film Critics Association	December 24, 2007	Best Foreign Language Film	FRANCE	Nominated	
St. Louis Film Critics Association	December 24, 2007	Best Score	Christopher Gunning	Nominated	
Vancouver Film Critics Circle	2008	Best Actress	Marion Cotillard	Won	
Women Film Critics Circle Awards	2007	Best Foreign Film by or About Women	La Vie en Rose	Nominated	
