= Aneta Langerová =

Czech musician

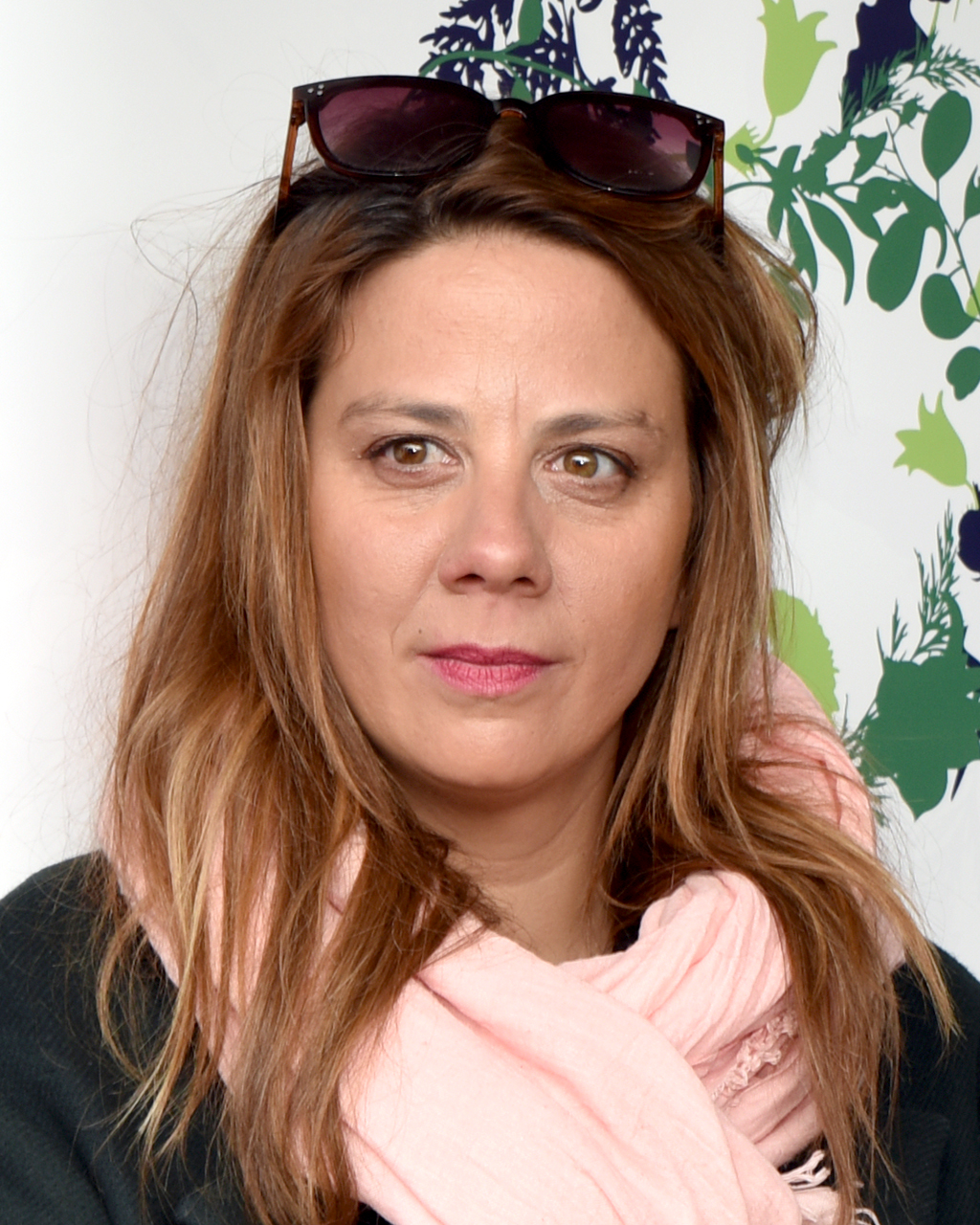
- Aneta Langerová in 2022

Background information
- Born: 26 November 1986 (age 39); Benešov, Czech Republic
- Origin: Říčany, Czech Republic
- Genres: rock, pop, alternative
- Occupation: Singer
- Instruments: vocals, guitar, bass guitar, keyboards, tambourine
- Years active: 2004–present
- Label: Sony/BMG
- Website: langerovaaneta.cz

Aneta Langerová (born 26 November 1986) is a Czech pop singer. Born in Benešov, Czech Republic and grew up in Říčany, she first rose to fame at age 17 as the first winner of Česko hledá SuperStar, the Czech version of Pop Idol, in June 2004. Later that year she released her first album, Spousta andělů, which became a long-term bestseller in the Czech Republic. She has since released two further albums and is currently one of the most popular musical artists in the Czech Republic.

In 2005 and 2006, she ranked first in the category 'Best Female Singer' in the Czech music poll Český slavík. In 2004, 2007 and 2012 she placed first in the same category of the Anděl Awards, organized by the Czech Academy of Popular Music.

She finished in second place in the Czech version of Dancing with the Stars - StarDance in 2010.

== Biography ==
Langerová grew up in Říčany, a town in the Central Bohemian Region. At age six, she began studying piano, and at age eight, she began taking guitar classes and singing in a choir with a local choir instructor. Langerová has credited her mother, who played piano and guitar around her house when she was growing up, with nurturing her musical talent.

In her teenage years, Langerová became more serious about music. At age 14, Langerová joined a local band called SPB in Sázava and then participated in and won several small TV talent contests (the Doremi TV competition and the Star Starters (in Czech: Rozjezdy pro hvězdy) contest) before participating in the first season of Česko hledá SuperStar, a popular Czech television show based on the Pop Idol format.

Langerová won the Česko hledá SuperStar competition with a 79 percent vote share in June 2004. In the course of the next three months, she quickly recorded her first album, Spousta andělů (Many Angels), composed of songs written by professional pop songwriters. The album enjoyed chart success in the Czech Republic, remaining at the top for 11 weeks in 2005. In 2005 and 2006, Langerová toured, released a live album and DVD and was closely involved with the Světluška Foundation, a charitable organization that works with blind children. Langerová played multiple benefit concerts for the organization and released a single, "Píseň pro světlušku" (Song for Světluška, "firefly" in Czech), to raise money for the group.

In 2007, Langerová released her second studio album, Dotyk (Contact), which showed her abilities beyond singing: she wrote or co-wrote all of the songs on the album and played guitar, piano, and bass on several tracks.

In 2017, she starred in a Czech Television film titled 8 hlav šílenství (8 Heads of Madness), portraying Soviet poet and gulag survivor Anna Barkova. The film is mainly about her life in the camps and the women she loved.

== Personal life ==
Langerová is openly lesbian.

== Discography ==
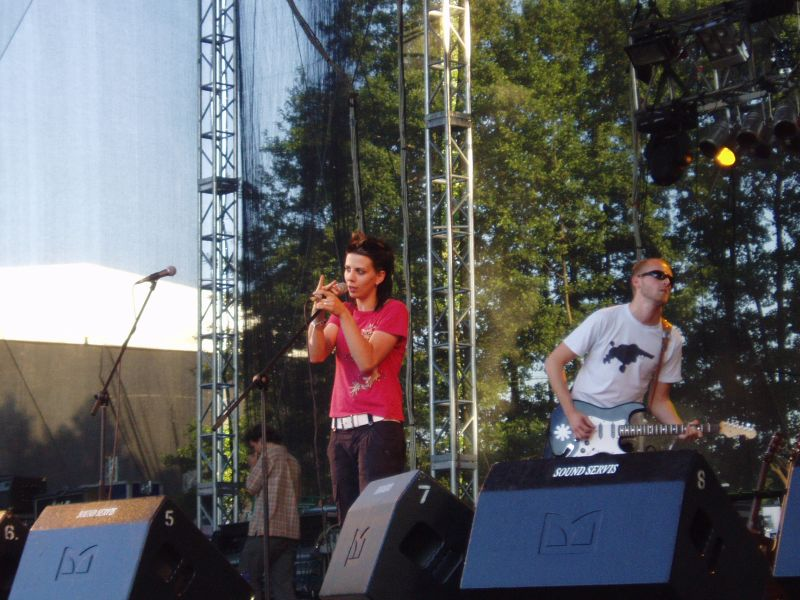
Aneta Langerova – Rock for People, 2006

=== Studio albums ===
==== Spousta andělů ====
Released 6 September 2004. "Spousta andělů" translates to English as "Many Angels". Sold in the Czech Republic: over 100.000 copies

Track listing

1. Skvělej nápad (Great Idea) Pavla Milcová (words)/Mirko Vukomanovič (music)
2. Spousta andělů (Many Angels) Pavla Milcová (words)/Kara DioGuardi, Jimmy Harry, Shep Solomon (music)
3. Nahá noc (Naked Night) Milan Princ (words)/Anna-Lena Högdahl, Tobbe Pettersson (music)
4. Delfín (Dolphin) Pavla Milcová (words)/Andreas Karlegård, Lisa Lindebergh (music)
5. Pár důvodů (A Few Reasons)Robert Nebřenský (words)/Ashley Hamilton, Per Kristian "Boots" Ottestad, Robbie Williams (music)
6. Nebe v loužích (Heaven in Puddles) Tomáš Roreček (words)/František Táborský (music)
7. Když nemůžu spát (When I Can't Sleep) Robert Nebřenský (words)/Rick Neigher, Shep Solomon (music)
8. Zvláštní zájem (Special Interest) Simona Ester Brandejsová (words)/Ingemar Åberg, Anna Nordell, Martin Terefe (music)
9. 17 Gabriela Osvaldová (words)/Lasse Andersson, Stephen Allen Davis (music)
10. Srdcotepec (Heartbeat) Oskar Petr (words)/Tobias Gad, Jacqueline Nemorin (music)
11. You're a Creep (the only English-language track on the album) Anthony Little (words)/Rick Kelly (music)
12. Hříšná těla, křídla motýlí (Sinful Bodies, Butterfly Wings) Oskar Petr (words and music)
13. Voda živá (Life Water) Michal Hrůza (words and music)

==== Dotyk ====
Released 21 May 2007, Dotyk is a departure from Langerová's previous efforts, dismissed by many as the product of slick production and professional songwriters. On "Dotyk," Langerová, had a hand in writing the music on all ten tracks (often sharing writing credits with her producers and other players on the album), and wrote four of the songs by herself. Langerová plays guitar, bass, and piano on a handful of tracks. "Dotyk" was produced by Jan P. Muchow, best known as a film composer and half of the Czech experimental rock group Ecstasy of Saint Theresa.

"Dotyk" translates to English as "Contact" or, alternatively, as "Touch."

Track listing

1. Malá mořská víla (Little Mermaid) Michal Hrůza/Aneta Langerová (words)/Aneta Langerová/Michal Hrůza/Jan P. Muchow/Dalibor Cidlinský (music)
2. Vysoké napětí (High Voltage) Robert Nebřenský (words)/Aneta Langerová (music)
3. Desetina (Tenth) Aneta Langerová (words and music)
4. Jiný sen (Distant Dream) Aneta Langerová (words) Aneta Langerová/Michal Hrůza/A.M. Almela (music)
5. Podzim (Autumn) Aneta Langerová (words and music)
6. Slib mi dej (Give Me Your Word) Lukáš Klofec (words)/Aneta Langerová/A.M. almela (music)
7. Možná (Maybe) Michal Hrůza (words)/Aneta Langerová/Jan. P. Muchow (music)
8. Hledám, mířím, netuším... (Look, Aim, Don't Suspect...") Aneta Langerová (words)/Aneta Langerová/ A.M. Almela (music)
9. Poplach (Alarm) Aneta Langerová/A.M Almela (words and music)
10. Němá (Speechless) Aneta Langerová (words and music)
- An acoustic version of "Podzim" is included as a hidden track at the four-minute mark of "Němá"

==== Jsem ====
Aneta's third album was released on 9 November 2009.

"Jsem" translates to English as "I Am".

Track listing

1. V bezvětří (In Still Air) Filip Horáček (words)/Aneta Langerová (music)
2. Jsem (I Am) Tomáš Klus (words)/Tomáš Klus, Aneta Langerová (music)
3. Jedináček (An Only Child) Oskar Petr, Martin Levina (words and music)
4. Pokušení (Temptation) Aneta Langerová, Martin Ledvina (words and music)
5. Už víš (You Know) Martin Ledvina (words and music)
6. Motýl (Butterfly) Aneta Langerová (words and music)
7. Stačilo říct (Suffice to Say) Michal Hrůza (words and music)
8. Dokola (Around) Aneta Langerová (words and music)
9. Den (Day) Filip Horáček (words and music)
10. Vzpomínka (Remembrance) Aneta Langerová (words and music)

==== Na Radosti ====
Aneta's fourth album was released on 28 November 2014. "Na Radosti" translates to English as "On the Joy"

Track listing

1. Dívka (Girl)
2. Svatá Kordula (Saint Cordula)
3. Panna (Virgin)
4. Tragédie u nás na vsi (Tragedy in Our Village)
5. Intermezzo Tráva (Intermezzo Grass)
6. Tráva (Grass)
7. Maják (Lighthouse)
8. Bříza (Birch)
9. Lehkost (Ease)
10. Slova z hor (Words from the Mountains)
11. Divoká hejna (Wild Flocks)
12. Nevěsta (Bride)
13. Na Radosti (On the Joy)

https://web.archive.org/web/20141201013805/http://www.langerovaaneta.cz/na-radosti/

=== Other releases ===
- Česko hledá SuperStar Top 10 (June 2004) (compilation of performances from television program "Česko hledá SuperStar")
- Spousta andělů koncert (November 2005) (live concert recording, recorded 9 September 2005)

Singles from Spousta andělů:

- Delfín cover of Selfish
- Hříšná těla, křídla motýlí
- Voda živá
- Srdcotepec

from Dotyk

- Malá mořská víla
- Podzim
- Desetina
- Vysoké napětí

from Jsem

- V bezvětří
- Stačilo říct
- Dokola
- Vzpomínka

from Na Radosti

- Svatá Kordula
- Tráva
- Tragédie u nás na vsi
