= 360 (film) =

2011 film directed by Fernando Meirelles

- Theatrical release poster
- Directed by: Fernando Meirelles
- Written by: Peter Morgan
- Based on: Reigen by Arthur Schnitzler (uncredited)
- Produced by: Andrew Eaton; David Linde; Emanuel Michael; Danny Krausz; Chris Hanley; Olivier Delbosc; Marc Missonnier
- Starring: Lucia Siposová; Gabriela Marcinková; Johannes Krisch; Jude Law; Moritz Bleibtreu; Jamel Debbouze; Dinara Drukarova; Vladimir Vdovichenkov; Rachel Weisz; Juliano Cazarré; Maria Flor; Ben Foster; Marianne Jean-Baptiste; Anthony Hopkins; Mark Ivanir
- Cinematography: Adriano Goldman
- Edited by: Daniel Rezende
- Music by: Mark Orton
- Production companies: BBC Films; The UK Film Council; ORF; Unison Films; Gravity Pictures; Hero Entertainment; Prescience; EOS Pictures; Wild Bunch; Film Location Austria; Österreichisches Filminstitut; Vienna Film Fund; Revolution; Dor Film; Fidélité Films; O2 Filmes; Muse Productions
- Distributed by: Wild Bunch (France); Filmladen (Austria); Paris Filmes (Brazil); Artificial Eye (United Kingdom)
- Release dates: 12 September 2011 (TIFF); 25 July 2012 (France); 3 August 2012 (U.S.); 10 August 2012 (UK)
- Running time: 110 minutes
- Countries: France; Austria; Brazil; United Kingdom
- Languages: English; German; Arabic; French; Portuguese; Russian; Slovak
- Box office: $4.3 million

360 is a 2011 drama thriller film directed by Fernando Meirelles and written by Peter Morgan as a loose adaptation of Arthur Schnitzler's 1897 play Reigen. The film stars an ensemble cast of Anthony Hopkins, Ben Foster, Rachel Weisz, Jude Law and other international actors. Following the stories of couples and their sexual encounters, 360 was selected to open the 2011 London Film Festival. Magnolia Pictures released the film on video on demand on 29 June 2012 and was released in United States theaters on 3 August 2012. The film reunited Weisz and director Meirelles, who worked together on The Constant Gardener.

== Plot ==
=== Vienna ===
Anna accompanies her sister Mirka to a nude photo-shoot for an escort agency, run by Rocco. Mirka chooses the professional name 'Blanca', and Rocco reveals he murdered a wealthy client, splitting his money with the escort who tipped him off. Anna waits downstairs while Mirka performs a “personal favor” for Rocco, and the sisters return to Bratislava by bus.

Rocco calls Mirka to meet a client named Michael Daly, and Anna accompanies her to Vienna. When one of Michael's associates loudly debates whether Mirka is a prostitute, Michael walks out, and leaves his wife multiple affectionate voicemails. Returning to his hotel, he receives a call from his associate, who talked to Blanca and blackmails Michael into a business deal.

=== Paris ===
An Algerian man spies on a woman wearing a red beret, on her way to the airport. It is clear he has feelings for her he cannot express. He talks to an imam, but continues to follow the married woman, and goes to his mosque and a therapist for advice.

=== London ===
Rose walks to a hotel, unaware a distraught woman is taking pictures of her. Rose meets Rui, and tells him they must end their affair, but they have sex. Returning home, Rui discovers his girlfriend Laura has left him, leaving him a video that reveals she was the woman photographing Rose. Michael Daly returns home, revealing he is married to Rose, and they attend their daughter's school play. In bed, Rose recalls Michael's voicemails, and when he mentions his next trip may be to Berlin, Rose exclaims that she would love to go.

=== Colorado ===
Sex offender Tyler, released after six years in prison, fears he is not ready to face the temptations outside. Boarding a flight home to Brazil, Laura chats with fellow passenger John, who is searching for his long-missing daughter, and they are stranded in Denver by bad weather. Tyler speaks on the phone with his social worker about his uncontrollable attractions, and encounters Laura in an airport restaurant. She invites him to her hotel room, but Tyler rebuffs her intoxicated advances and locks himself in the bathroom.

The next day, John finds Laura, and is moved when she hugs him before parting ways. John arrives in Phoenix to examine unidentified remains, which turn out not to be his daughter. At an Alcoholics Anonymous meeting, John declares that he can finally accept his daughter's unknown fate and move on.

At the meeting, Valentina (Dinara Drukarova) shares her own story, revealing she is the woman the Algerian man spied on in Paris. She plans to divorce her husband Sergei, who is consumed with working for a crooked Russian businessman, and she is secretly in love with her boss.

=== Back in Paris ===
Returning home, Valentina tells Sergei she wants a divorce and is interested in someone else, but Sergei ignores her and leaves. Valentina arrives for work at a dental office, where her boss is the Algerian man. They repress their feelings for each other, and he tells her she should find another job; both are heartbroken as she leaves.

=== Back in Vienna ===
Sergei picks up his boss, who reprimands him for studying English. Mirka and Anna arrive in Vienna, and Sergei sends Mirka to his boss' hotel room. Anna and Sergei bond over their mutual love for books and learning English, and she persuades him to drive them around the city.

At the hotel, Sergei’s boss shows Mirka a briefcase of cash, and she texts Rocco. While Mirka performs fellatio, Sergei's boss reads her phone; realizing she plans to rob him, he knocks her unconscious and calls Sergei. Returning to the hotel, Sergei finds himself in the elevator with Rocco. Leaving as Rocco attacks the boss, Sergei drives away with Anna. Regaining consciousness, Mirka takes the money and leaves. In voiceover, Anna reads a farewell letter to her sister.

=== Berlin ===
Michael walks through Berlin with his business associate, professing his love for his wife. They meet Rose, and she and Michael head to the airport arm-in-arm. The associate notices a woman walk into a building; she meets Rocco for a photo shoot.

== Cast ==
- Lucia Siposová as Mirka
- Gabriela Marcinková as Anna
- Johannes Krisch as Rocco
- Jude Law as Michael Daly
- Moritz Bleibtreu as Salesman #1
- Jamel Debbouze as Algerian Man
- Dinara Drukarova as Valentina
- Vladimir Vdovichenkov as Sergei
- Rachel Weisz as Rose Daly
- Juliano Cazarré as Rui
- Maria Flor as Laura
- Ben Foster as Tyler McGregor
- Marianne Jean-Baptiste as Fran
- Anthony Hopkins as John
- Mark Ivanir as Sania
- Danica Jurcova as Alina
- Peter Morgan as Salesman #2
- Riann Steele as Waitress
- François-Xavier Demaison as Taxi Driver
- Patty Hannock as Psychiatrist
- Djemel Barak as Imam
- Chipo Chung as Editor
- Sydney Wade as Ellie
- Byrd Wilkins as Social Worker
- Martin McDougall as Airport Policeman
- Gerard Monaco as Airport Security Desk Official
- Youssef Kerkour as Phoenix Policeman
- Sean Power as AA Secretary
- Christoph Zadra as Hotel Security Person
- Tereza Srbova as European Girl
- Giorgio Spiegelfeld as Photographer
- Lisa Palfrey as Psychologist

== Reception ==
On review aggregator Rotten Tomatoes, the film holds an approval rating of 19% based on 77 reviews, with an average rating of 4.43/10. The website's critics consensus reads: "Spreading itself thin across a sprawling narrative without a unifying focus, 360 just keeps running in circles." On Metacritic, the film has a weighted average score of 43 out of 100, based on 24 critics, indicating "mixed or average reviews".

Philip French in The Observer (London) concluded: "360 has a gleaming surface and a knowing air, but essentially it reflects the lives of people who spend too much time in planes". Manohla Dargis in The New York Times said: "There are moments in 360 that show what the movie might have been ... But the overshooting and overediting here suggest Mr. Meirelles, or maybe the producers, were trying to work around this story, instead of with it".
