= Lucia Siposová =

Slovak actress and writer

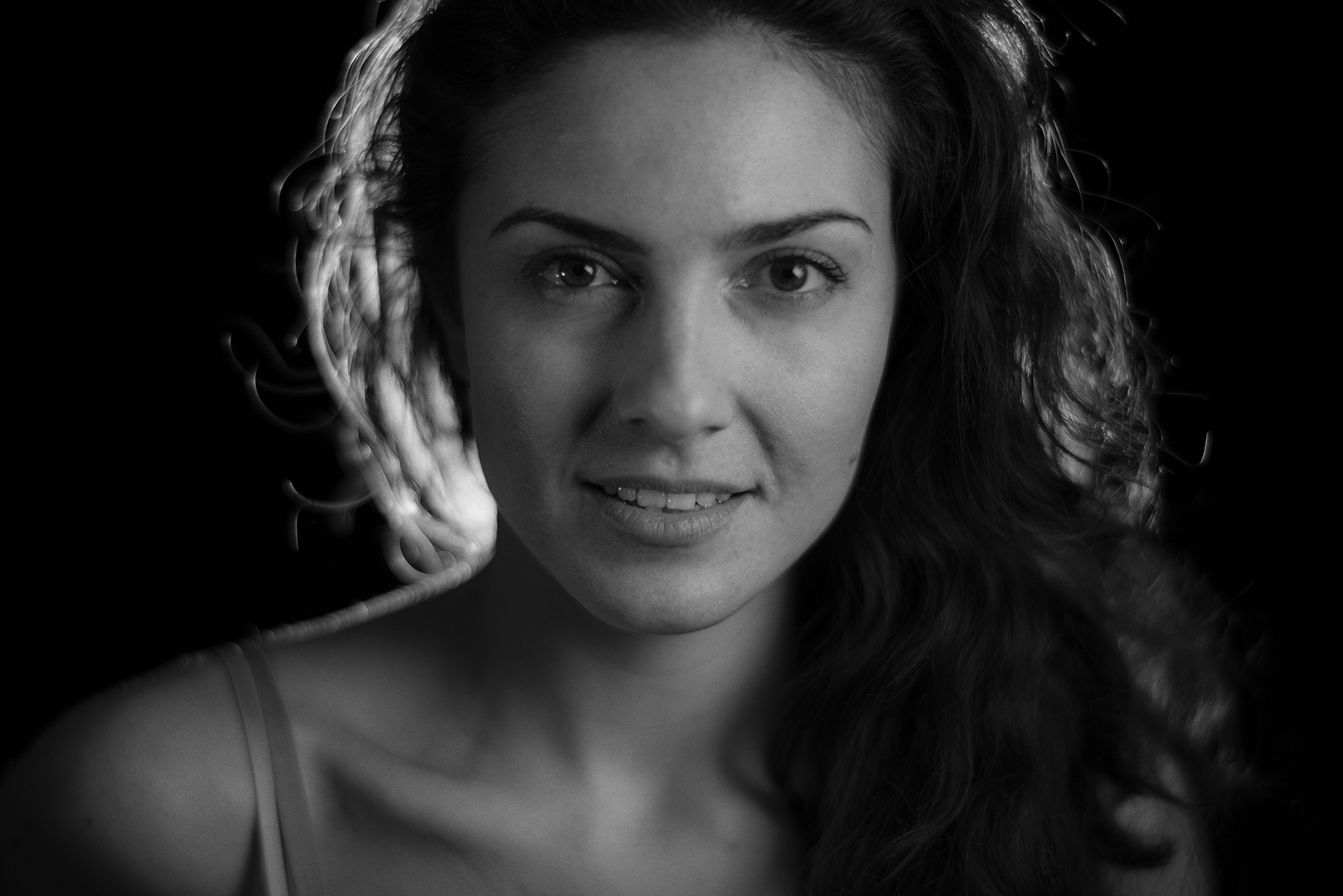
- Lucia Siposová (2014)
- Born: 21 May 1980 (age 46); Bratislava, Czechoslovak Socialist Republic (now Slovakia)
- Occupation: Actress

Lucia Siposová (born 21 May 1980) is a Slovak stage, television and film actress and writer.

== Career ==
Together with Karel Roden she played the lead role in a Czech period drama Guard No. 47 directed by Filip Renč for which she received the Best actress award 2008 at the International film festival in Tiburon, USA. She got a role in the international feature film 360 directed by Oscar nominee Fernando Meirelles and written by Oscar nominee Peter Morgan. 360 gave Lucia recognition in international media.

She is an author of a book “Hello. My name is Anča Pagáčová.“ She continued as a writer with the screenplay for the motion picture Tigers in the city directed by Juraj Krasnohorsky that she also co-produced. Member of Slovak PEN centre.

In 2013 she appeared at the stage in Slovak/Slovenian reality cabaret show Slovenka na kvadrat written by Stanislava Repar and directed by Nick Upper.
