= Josef Kopta =

Czech writer and journalist

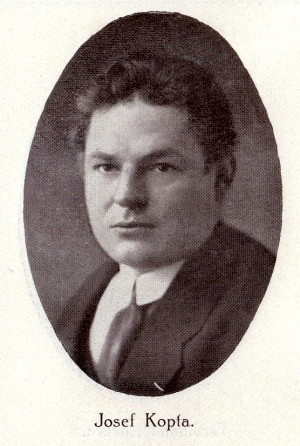
Josef Kopta, before 1923

Josef Kopta (16 June 1894 in Libochovice, Bohemia – 3 April 1962 in Prague) was a Czech writer and journalist.

Before World War I, Kopta worked as a bank clerk. In 1914 he was sent to the Eastern front, in 1915 taken prisoner and later joined Czechoslovak Legions in Russia.

After the war he worked as a journalist in newspapers Národní osvobození and Lidové noviny. In 1919 Kopta started to write poetry, without having much of success. During the 1920s and 1930s he, together with František Langer and Rudolf Medek represented literary form concentrated on the Legions (legionářská literatura). Kopta's short novels and stories were the most successful of his writing.

Kopta concentrates on common people dragged into the war and on psychology of characters during the warfare and post-war life. His characters enthusiastically support the national cause and are usually suspicious of the Russian Revolution of 1917. Before and after World War II, Kopta published several books for the youth.

== Selected works ==
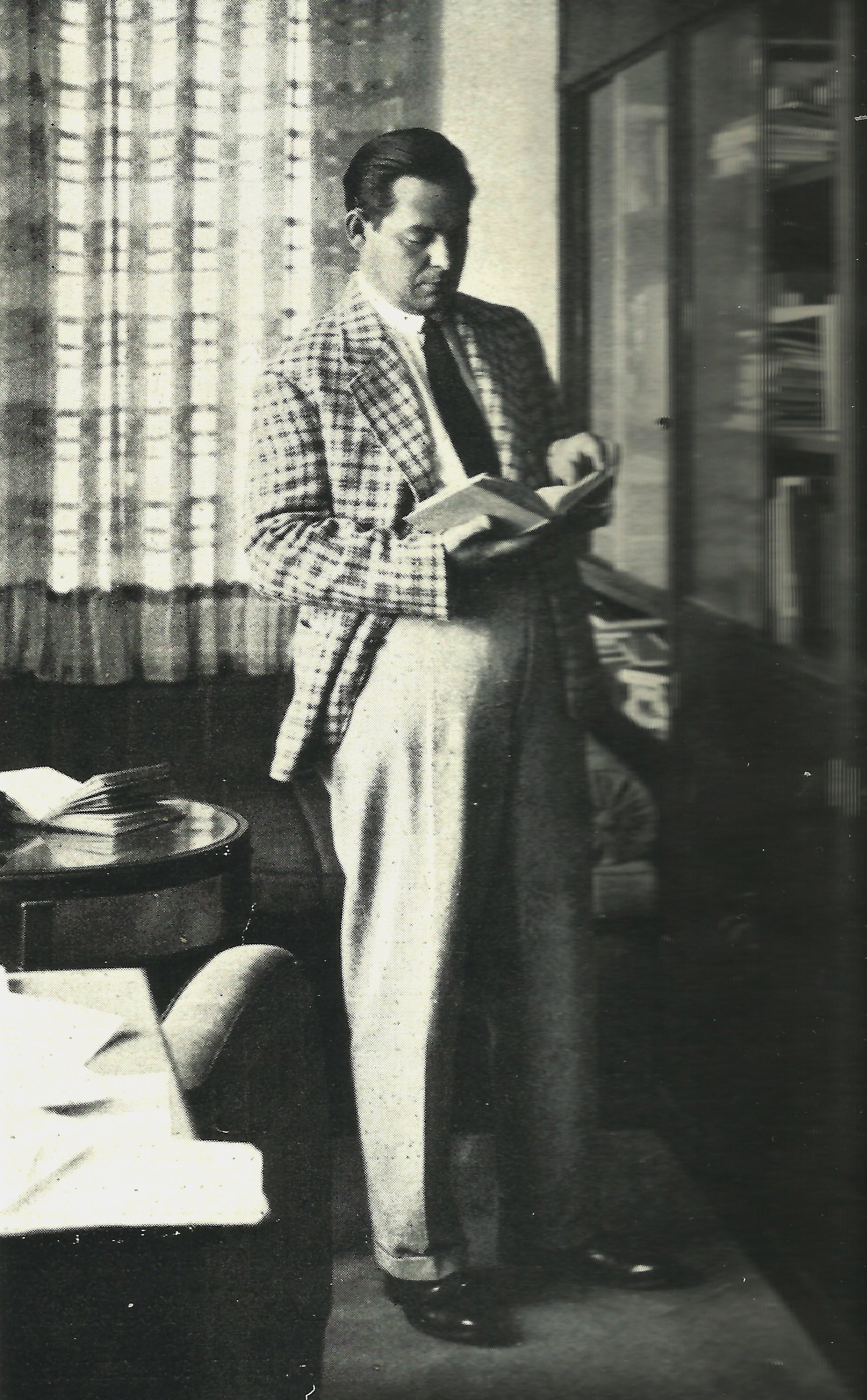
Josef Kopta in 1928

- The trilogy The Third Company (Třetí rota, 1924), The Third Company on the Magistral (Třetí rota na magistrále, 1927) and The Third Company at Home (Třetí rota doma, 1934) is based on author's experience in the Legions. The first book was the most successful, and it was filmed in 1931.
- The novel Guard No. 47 (Hlídač č.47, 1926), a psychological story about a railway guard who is temporarily deafened and later, after the disability goes away, pretends to still be deaf to find out what his friends and acquaintances are really saying about him. The novel ends tragically. A movie based on the book was filmed in 1937, according to a screenplay by Otakar Vávra. A different movie adaptation, directed by Filip Renč, was released in 2008 under the name Guard No. 47.
- The novel Adolf waits for the death (Adolf čeká na smrt, 1933) about common people who, despite lack of fortune, rise to ethical greatness.
