= Ivan Franěk =

Czech actor (born 1964)

- Born: 17 June 1964 (age 62); Plzeň, Czechoslovakia
- Other name: Ivan Franeck
- Occupation: Actor

Ivan Franěk (born 17 June 1964), sometimes credited as Ivan Franeck, is a Czech film and television actor.

== Early life and education ==
He was born in Plzeň, Czechoslovakia. Franěk moved to France in 1989.

== Career ==
His first major role was appearing as Tobias in the romance drama film Brucio Nel Vento (English: Burning in the Wind) (2002), directed Silvio Soldini. He has performed in Italian and French films and television, and has made an occasional appearance in Czech films including appearing as Karel in the drama film Tajnosti (English: Little Girl Blue) (2007) directed by Alice Nellis.

== Selected filmography ==
- Chaos (2001)
- Absolitude (2001)
- Cuore di Donna (2002)
- Vodka Lemon (2003)
- Burning in the Wind (2002) as Tobias
- Les Marins Perdus (2003)
- Sulla Mia Pelle (2003)
- 36 Quai des Orfèvres (2004) as Bruno Winterstein
- Le Cri (2006)
- Premonition (2006) as Thomas Jozic
- Tajnosti (English: Little Girl Blue) (2007) as Karel
- Clare and Francis (2007) as Federico
- The Army of Crime (2009) as Feri Boczov
- Isole (2012)
- Tulpa (2012)
- La grande bellezza (2013)
- Blood of My Blood (2015)
- Chlorine (2015)
- Ears (2016)
- Bloody Richard (2017)
- The Invisible Boy - Second Generation (2018)
- Anna (2019)
