= Barbora Hrzánová =

Czech actress and musician (born 1964)

- Hrzánová in 2023
- Born: 22 April 1964 (age 62); České Budějovice, Czechoslovakia
- Education: Academy of Performing Arts in Prague
- Occupations: Actress, musician
- Years active: 1984–present
- Spouse: Radek Holub
- Children: 1
- Parent(s): Jiří Hrzán (father); Věra Šmídová (mother)
- Relatives: Karel Dobrý (brother-in-law)

Barbora Hrzánová (born 22 April 1964) is a Czech actress and musician. She won the Alfréd Radok Award for Best Actress in 1994 for her role in the play The Seagull at the Theatre on the Balustrade in Prague. At the 2003 Thalia Awards, she won Best Actress in a Play for her role in Hrdý Budžes at the Antonín Dvořák Theatre in Příbram. She is married to actor Radek Holub, with whom she often performs on stage.

== Career ==
=== Acting ===
After graduating from Prague's DAMU, Hrzánová joined the National Theater. In 1993, she moved to the Theatre on the Balustrade.

Her first prominent film role was in Filip Renč's 1992 production Requiem pro panenku, for which she was awarded at the Toronto International Film Festival. In 1994, she won the Alfréd Radok Award for Best Actress in Chekhov's play The Seagull. Following this, she spent ten years at Divadlo v Řeznické in Prague, also appearing at Divadlo Na Jezerce.

She has been nominated for a Czech Lion Award three times: for Best Supporting Actress in Thanks for Every New Morning (1994), Conspirators of Pleasure (1996), and Modrý tygr (2012). She won a Thalia Award in 2003 for her performance in the production Hrdý Budžes.

=== Other projects ===
The actress is a member of the band Bára Hrzánová & Condurango, which she formed in the 1980s with fellow DAMU alumnus Pavel Anděl. She is the band's primary songwriter, as well as singing and playing percussion and the trumpet. She has also coauthored the book Vinnetou naší doby: Velký tajem staré lišky Báry Hrzánové, together with magazine editor Richard Erml.

== Personal life ==
Hrzánová is married to Radek Holub. She is the daughter of actor Jiří Hrzán, and her brother-in-law is Karel Dobrý. Her nephew is actor and model Cyril Dobrý.

== Selected filmography ==
=== Film ===
List of film appearances, with year, title, and role shown
Year	Title	Role	Notes
1992	Requiem pro panenku	Johanka	
1994	Thanks for Every New Morning	Lenka	
1996	Conspirators of Pleasure	Postmistress	
2006	Pleasant Moments	Sára	
2012	Modrý tygr	Gerzová	

=== Television ===
List of television appearances, with year, title, and role shown
Year	Title	Role	Notes
2002–08	Carodejné pohádky	Narrator	13 episodes
2003	Hospital at the End of the City, Twenty Years On	Saša Machovcová	12 episodes
2005	Dobrá čtvrť		3 episodes
2008	Hospital at the End of the City – The New Generation	Saša Machovcová	13 episodes
