= Smart Philip =

2003 Czech comedy film

- Theatrical release poster
- Directed by: Václav Marhoul
- Narrated by: Tomáš Hanák
- Release date: 2003
- Country: Czech Republic
- Language: Czech

Smart Philip (Czech: Mazaný Filip) is a 2003 Czech comedy film, directed by Václav Marhoul, and based on a stage play by Sklep Theatre.

== Cast ==
- Tomáš Hanák as Philip Marlowe
- Vilma Cibulková as Velma Hatfield
- Oldřich Kaiser as Paolo Perrugini
- Ivo Kubečka as Jules Amthor
- Viktor Preiss as Barman At The Egypt Club
- Bohumil "Bob" Klepl as Reception Clerk In Central
- Eva Holubová as Tornado You (sings by Tereza Dufková)
- Milan Šteindler as Benjamin Frogg, The Director
- Jakub Špalek as Guest In Hotel
- Jan Slovák as Officer Kid
- Petr Vacek as Kenny Mattel
- Lenka Vychodilová as Taxi Driver
- Ivan Vyskočil as Old Man In The Lift
- Tomáš Vorel as Entertainer
- Jaroslav Dušek as Film Director
- Matěj Hádek as A Friend In Studio
- Šimon Caban as Chandler
- Miroslav Etzler as L.A. Mayor
- Martin Duba as Film Sharpener
- Ivan Trojan as Make Up Artist
- Otakáro Schmidt as Bedouin
- Zdeněk David as Drunkard
- Jiří Fero Burda as Lieutenant McGee
- Petr Čtvrtníček as Jussepe, The Gangster
- Pavel Liška as Charlie Brown / Nigel Smith
- Aleš Najbrt as Magician
- Jiří Macháček as De Soto
- Robert Nebřenský as McChesney
- Martin Zbrožek as Cinematographer
- Radomil Uhlíř as Gogo
- Barbara Trojanová as Film Clappet
- František Skála as Ben Goodman
- Michal Novotný as Lopez, The Barman
- Ruth Horáčková as Maid
- Miroslav Táborský as Adolfo, The Gangster
- Matěj Forman, Petr Forman, Tereza Kučerová, Václav Marhoul, Štefan Uhrík, Vlastimil Zavřel, Jan Kraus, Čestmír Suška, Standa Diviš, Monika Načeva, Aleš Týbl, Jiří David, Libor Balabán, Zdeněk Lhotský, Petr Nikl, Anna Geislerová

== Theatre ==
=== Šlapanice Theatre ===
Directed by Hana Krčmová. The premiere had 14 March 2008 in Sokol House in Šlapanice.

- Phil Marlowe .... Tomáš Thomas Příkrý
- Paul Vannier .... Marek Gumeny šudoma
- Vivien Harfield .... Klára Bednářová
- Receptionist Clerk .... Veronika Přikrylová
- Kuvalick .... Mirek Hrozek
- Barman at the Egypt Club .... Marek Charvát
- Barflies .... Milan Pernica and Jiří Přichystal
- Cinematographer .... Veronika Přikrylová
- Friends .... Gabriela Zmeškalová or Eva Benešová
- Electrician .... Tereza Urbanová
- Comparsist .... Jakub Hýbela or Pavel Svoboda
- Director .... Barbora Krčmová
- Producer .... Marek Šudoma
- Film Clappet .... Tereza Hašková
- Jules Amthor .... Jakub Juráň or Miloš Borovička
- Barman in Mexico Bar .... Mirek Hrozek
- McChesney .... Roman Koplík
- Hubert, gay in bar .... Jakub Hýbela or Pavel Svoboda
- Mafioso Adolfo .... Miloš Borovička / Jakub Juráň
- Mafioso Jussepe .... Aleš Vodička
- Mafioso De Soto .... Jiří Klimeš
- Mafioso Gogo .... Marek Charvát
- Boss Perrugini .... Petr Jahoš
- School girl .... Tereza Hašková
- Sergeant .... Petr Holík
- Stážník .... Jakub Hýbela / Pavel Svoboda
- Cop Fialka .... Mirek Hrozek
- Doctor Frank Ruman .... Jiří Klimeš
- Servant ot Hospital .... Petr Holík / Jakub Hýbela / PAvel Svoboda
- Joe Bacci .... Marek Šudoma
- Cold Cook .... Petr Holík / Jakub Juráň / Miloš Borovička
