= 2007 Czech Lion Awards =

Czech film award ceremony

15th Czech Lion Awards
- Date: March 1, 2008
- Site: Lucerna, Prague
- Hosted by: Jaroslav Dušek

Highlights
- Best Actor: Ivan Trojan; Václav
- Best Actress: Marion Cotillard; La Vie en rose
- Best Supporting Actor: Jan Budař; Václav
- Best Supporting Actress: Zuzana Bydžovská; Gympl
- Most awards: Empties (3)
- Most nominations: Little Girl Blue (10)

Television coverage
- Network: Česká televize

2007 Czech Lion Awards ceremony was held on 1 March 2008.

== Winners and nominees ==
Best Film	Best Director
Little Girl Blue; Empties; Václav	Jan Svěrák - Empties; Alice Nellis - Little Girl Blue; Petr Nikolaev - It's Gonna Get Worse
Best Actor in a Leading Role	Best Actress in a Leading Role
Ivan Trojan - Václav; Zdeněk Svěrák - Empties; Karel Roden - Little Girl Blue	Marion Cotillard - La Vie en rose; Iva Bittová - Little Girl Blue; Daniela Kolářová - Empties
Best Actor in a Supporting Role	Best Actress in a Supporting Role
Jan Budař - Václav; Pavel Landovský - Empties; Boleslav Polívka - ROMing	Zuzana Bydžovská - Gympl; Martha Issová - Little Girl Blue; Anna Geislerová - Teddy Bear
Best Screenplay	Design
Zdeněk Svěrák - Empties; Alice Nellis - Little Girl Blue; Marek Epstein and Jiří Vejdělek - Václav	Jan Balej - One Night in One City; Petr Pištěk, Tomáš Kučas, Martin Novotný - It's Gonna Get Worse; Simona Rybáková - It's Gonna Get Worse
Best Cinematography	Best Editing
Ramunas Greičius - Little Girl Blue; Vladimír Smutný - Empties; Diviš Marek - It's Gonna Get Worse	Jiří Brožek - It's Gonna Get Worse; Alois Fišánek - Empties; Adam Dvořák - Little Girl Blue
Music	Sound
Becky Bentham, Edouard Dubois, Christopher Gunning - La Vie en rose; Jan P. Muchow - Václav; Vladimír Godár - The Country Teacher	Laurent Zeilig - La Vie en rose; Jakub Čech, Pavel Rejholec - Empties; Viktor Ekrt, Marek Hart - Little Girl Blue

=== Non-statutory Awards ===
Most Popular Film	Unique Contribution to Czech Film
Empties	Vojtěch Jasný
Film Critics' Award	Best Foreign Film
Little Girl Blue	The Art of Negative Thinking
Sazka Award for Unrealised Script	Best Film Poster
Nocturno	It's Gonna Get Worse
