= Czech Soda =

Czech satirical television show

Česká soda is a satirical TV show created by Febio for Czech Television. The show aired between the years 1993 and 1997. Total number of 14 episodes was created plus two New Year's Eve specials and a 1998 full-length picture. Running time of one episode was approximately 15 minutes.

== Overview ==
The show consisted of a news summary presented by Petr Čtvrtníček, parodies of TV advertisements and since the second episode of a German-language course "Alles Gute" created by David Vávra and Milan Šteindler.

After a trademark dispute with a company producing a drink of the same name, the show was renamed to Čtvrtníček, Šteindler a Vávra uvádějí, and occasionally appeared on TV until 2000.
