= Halina Pawlowská =

Czech playwright, writer, and actress

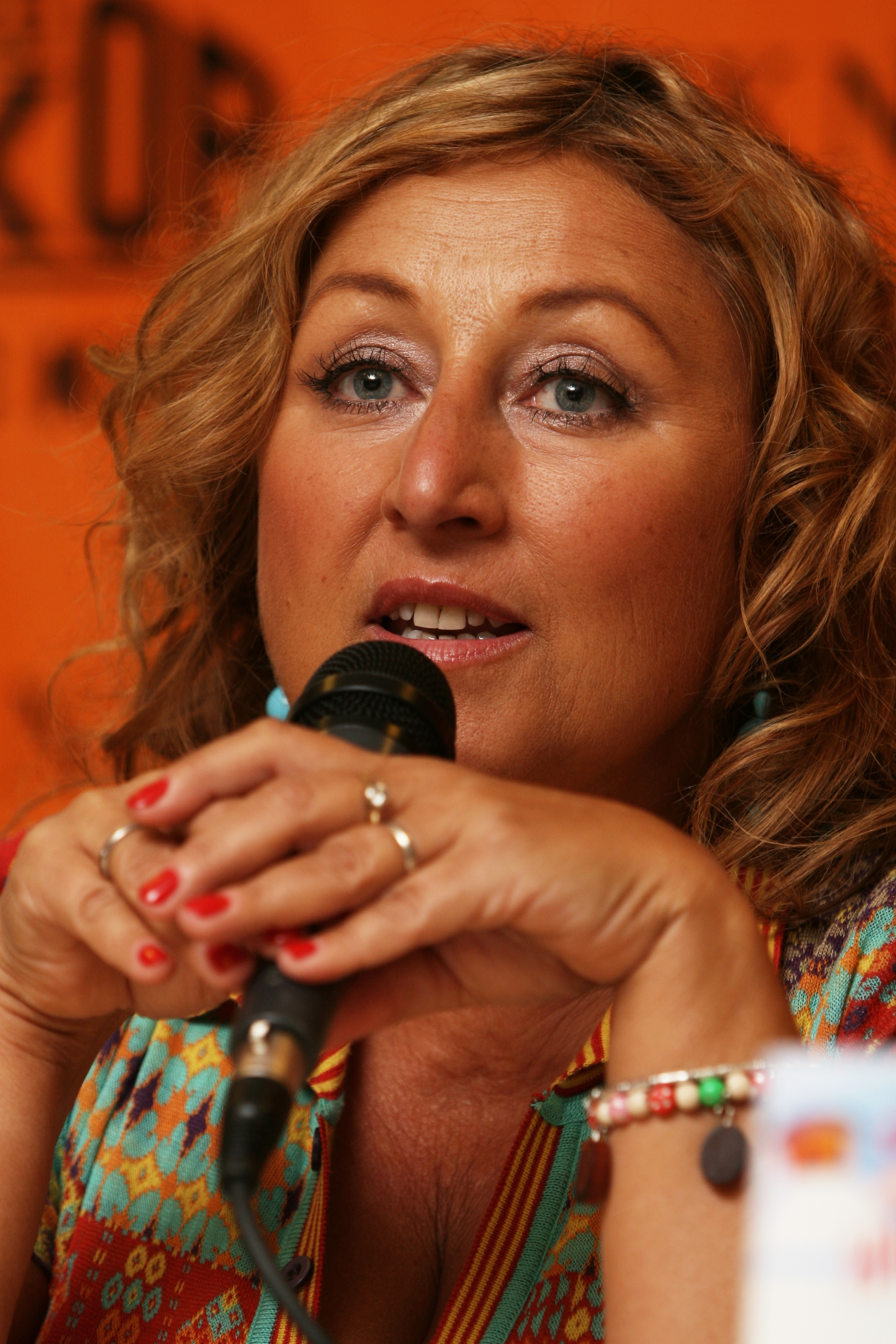
- Halina Pawlowská (2008)
- Born: Halina Kločuraková; 21 March 1955 (age 71); Prague, Czechoslovakia
- Education: FAMU
- Occupations: screenwriter, presenter, writer
- Years active: 1983-present
- Website: halinapawlowska.cz

Halina Pawlowská (born 21 March 1955) is a Czech playwright, short story writer, journalist and editor. She has worked as a screenwriter and show presenter for Czech television.

== Biography ==
Born in Prague, Pawlowská attended a local grammar school before studying dramaturgy and scriptwriting at the Film and TV School of the Academy of Performing Arts where she graduated in 1981. She then worked as a screenwriter for Czech Television, took part in various entertainment programmes, and later became a presenter. She has also been a columnist or editor for various Czech newspapers and journals. Now one of the Czech Republic's most successful writers, her short stories and television series are often based on her world of young adults with amusing interpretations of love or chaotic marriages.

== Works ==
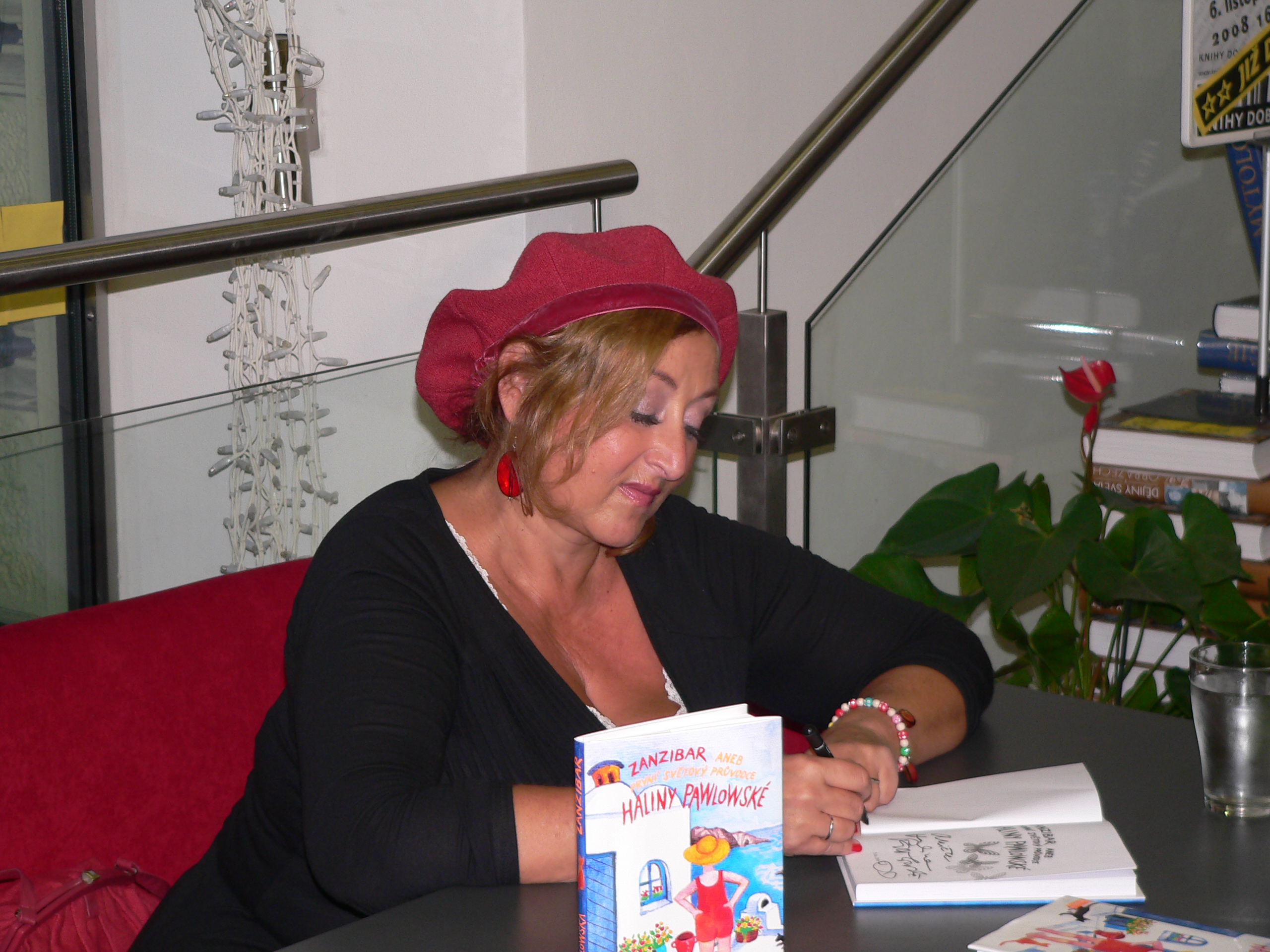
Halina Pawlowská autographing her works in Brno, 2008

=== Books ===
- Zoufalé ženy dělají zoufalé věci, 1993
- Díky za každé nové ráno, 1994
- Proč jsem se neoběsila, 1994
- Ať zešílí láskou, 1995
- Ó, jak ti závidím, 1995
- Jak být šťastný: dvanáct nemorálních rad, 1996
- Hroši nepláčou, 1996
- Charakter mlčel, a mluvilo tělo, 1997
- Dá-li pánbůh zdraví, i hříchy budou, 1998
- Banánové rybičky, 2000
- Banánové chybičky, 2003
- Tři v háji, 2004 (co-written with Michal Viewegh and Iva Hercíková)
- Záhada žlutých žabek, 2005
- Velká žena z Východu, 2011
- Strašná Nádhera, 2012

=== Film and television scripts ===
- Evo, vdej se!, 1983
- Můj hříšný muž, 1986
- Malé dějiny jedné rodiny, 1988/89 (TV series)
- Vrať se do hrobu!, 1989 (co-written with Milan Šteindler; semi-autobiographical)
- Díky za každé nové ráno, 1993
- Bubu a Filip, 1996 – TV series
- O mé rodině a jiných mrtvolách, 2011 (TV series)
- Doktoři z Počátků, 2013 (TV series)
- U Haliny v kuchyni, 2014 (TV series)

=== Appearances as an actress ===
- Jak básníkům chutná život, 1987
- Vrať se do hrobu!, 1989
- Zálety koňského handlíře, 1991
- Díky za každé nové ráno, 1993
