= Petr Ulrych =

Czech musician and composer (born 1944)

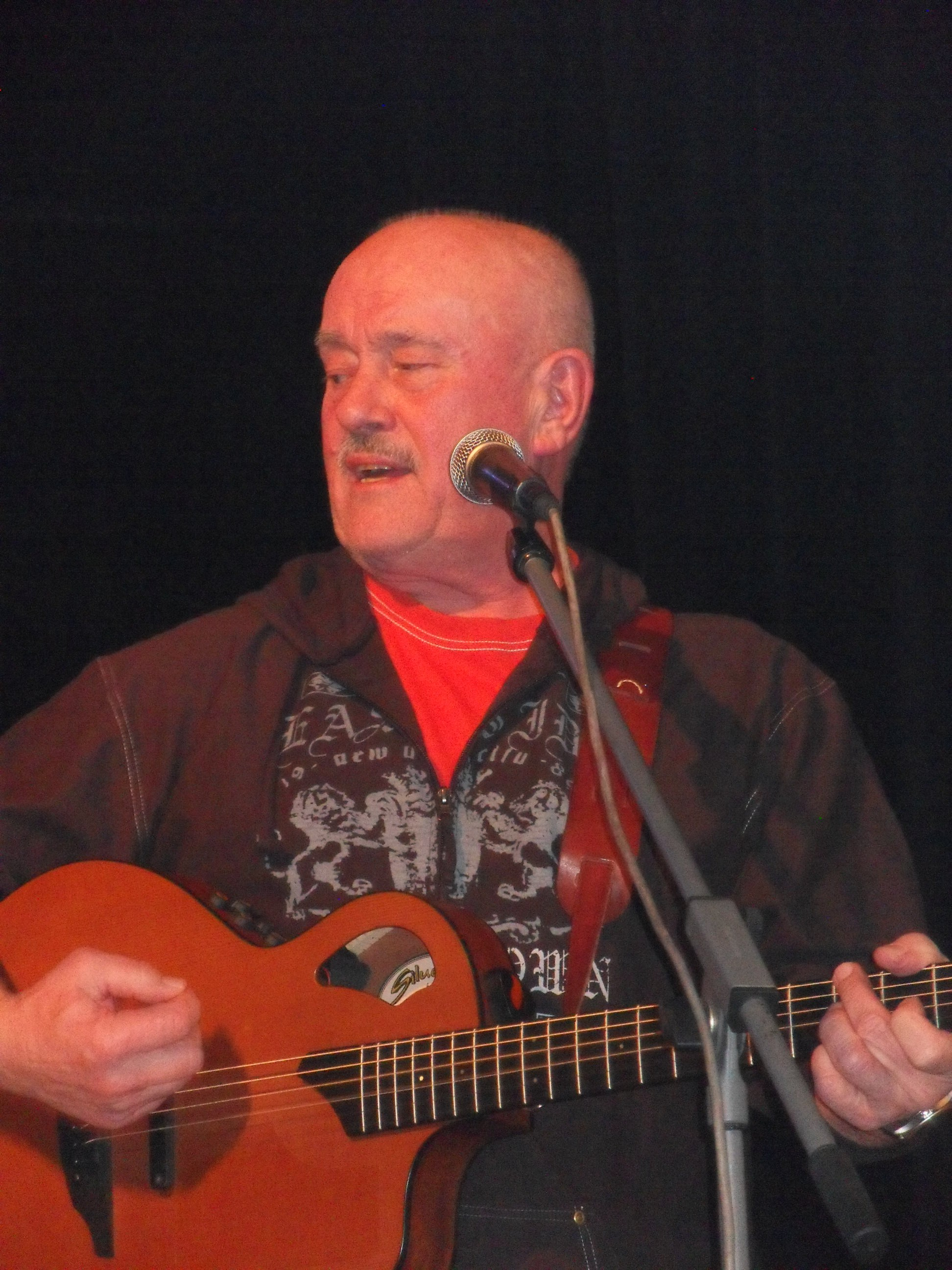
- Ulrych in 2010

Background information
- Born: 21 February 1944 (age 82); Hradec Králové, Protectorate of Bohemia and Moravia
- Genres: Pop; folk; rock
- Occupations: Musician, composer
- Instruments: Guitar; piano; double bass; vocals
- Years active: 1961–present
- Member of: Javory, Javory Beat
- Formerly of: Vulkán; Atlantis
- Website: javory.cz

Petr Ulrych (born 21 February 1944) is a Czech musician as well as film and theatre composer. He is the brother of Hana Ulrychová, with whom he leads the folk band Javory and its rock-oriented cousin, Javory Beat. In the 1960s, the duo played in the band Vulkán and later formed Atlantis.

== Life and career ==
After finishing high school, Ulrych studied aeronautical engineering at the military academy in Brno, as well as studying the piano privately and the double bass at the Brno Conservatory for two years. In 1961, he co-founded the Divadlo bez tradic theatre in Brno, where he was later joined by his younger sister Hana. In 1964, he joined the rock band Vulkán and three years later, formed the rock group Atlantis together with Hana.

During the Normalization era in Czechoslovakia, the band's rock sound was forbidden, as were Ulrych's politically themed lyrics, causing him to abandon the group and form the folk-tinged project Javory, again with Hana in tow. Years later, he returned to his original beat style with the rock-oriented cousin project Javory Beat.

Ulrych has also composed music for film and theatrical productions. In 2001, he won the Alfréd Radok Award for Koločava at the Brno City Theatre.

== Selected musical work ==
=== Scores ===
- Sonáta pro zrzku (1980)
- O statečném kováři (1983)
- My holky z městečka (1985)
- Thanks for Every New Morning (1994)

=== Discography ===
With Atlantis

- Odyssea (1969 – not released until 1990)

With Hana Ulrychová

- 13 HP (1971)
- Hej dámy, děti a páni (1972)
- Hana & Petr (1974)
- Nikola šuhaj loupežník (1974 – with Orchestr Gustava Broma)
- Meč a přeslice (1975)
- Best Of – ze starých LP (1998)

With Javory

- Ententýny (1978)
- Zpívání (1982)
- Zpívání při vínečku (1983)
- Bylinky (1985)
- Příběh (1987)
- To nejlepší s Javory (1994)

Solo

- Cestou k tichému hlasu (1991)
- Bílá místa (1993)
- O naději (1997)
- Pokoj lidem dobré vůle (1998)
- Seď a tiše poslouchej (1999)
- Malé zrnko písku (1999)
- Koločava (2002)
- Šumaři (2003)
- Písně (2005)
- Stromy, voda, tráva (2006)
- Čtyřicet nej (2007)
- Bratr sestry (2012)
- Půlstoletí (1964–2014) (2014)
