= Requiem pro panenku =

1992 Czech psychological thriller film

Requiem for a Doll
- Directed by: Filip Renč
- Written by: Igor Chaun, Filip Renč
- Starring: Anna Geislerová, Soňa Valentová, Eva Holubová
- Cinematography: Juraj Fándli
- Edited by: Jan Mattlach
- Music by: Ondřej Soukup
- Release date: 1992
- Running time: 94 minutes
- Country: Czechoslovakia
- Language: Czech

Requiem for a Doll (Czech: Requiem pro panenku) is a Czech psychological thriller / drama film inspired by a real-life tragedy that cost the lives of 26 mentally disabled girls. Released in 1992, it was the directorial debut of Filip Renč who also starred in a supporting role and until today it is his most successful movie. It was also the main role debut for the then 14 years old actress Anna Geislerová.

== Cast ==
- Aňa Geislerová
- Eva Holubová
- Barbora Hrzánová
- Filip Renč
- Soňa Valentová
- Jaroslava Hanušová
- Jan Schmid
- Věra Nováková
- Eduard Cupák
- Stanislav Tříska
- Vlasta Mecnarowská
- Zuzana Dančiaková
- Josef Klíma
