= Sklep Theatre =

Theatre in Prague, Czechia

- Czech: Divadlo Sklep
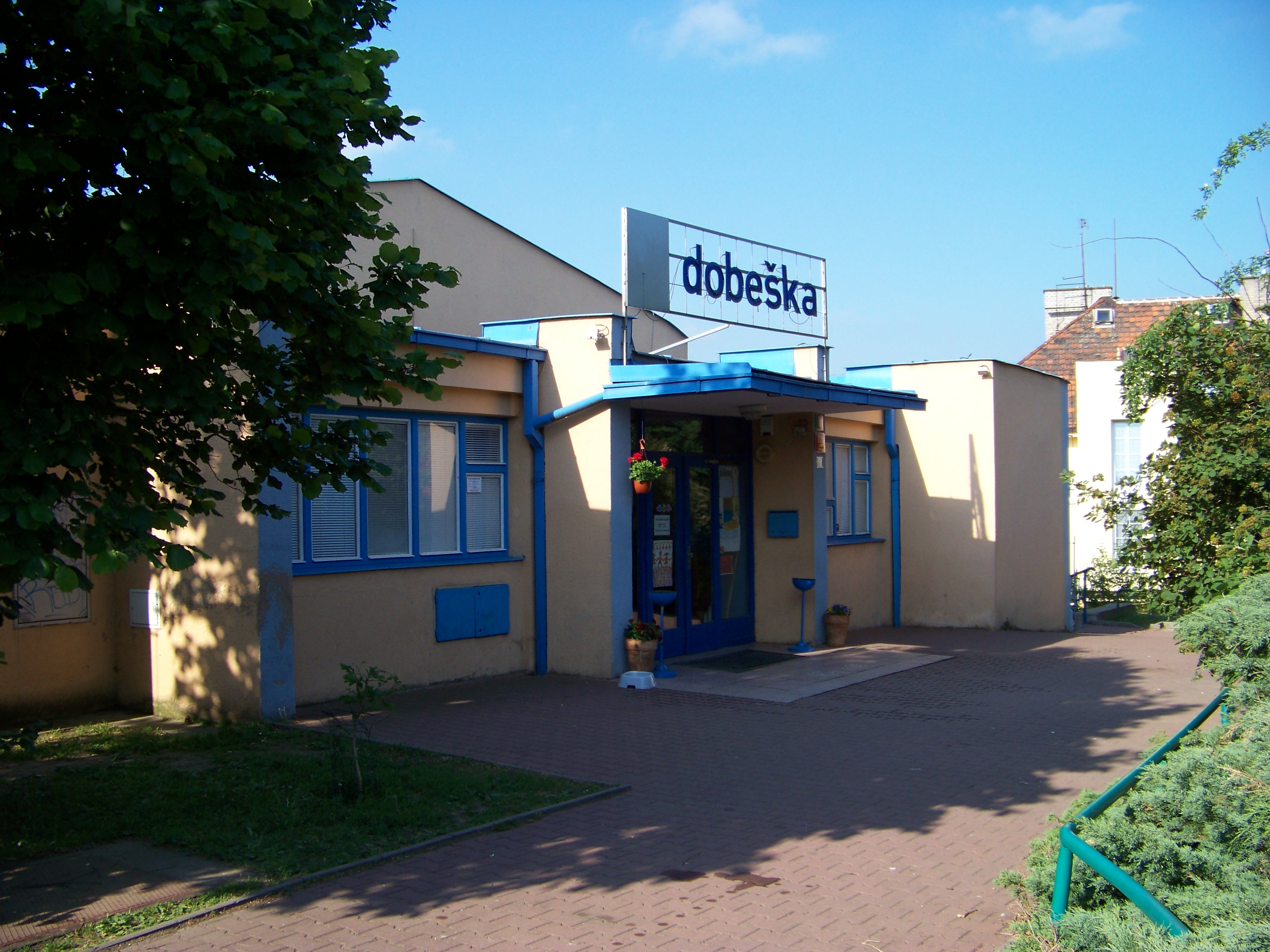
- Divadlo Dobeška cultural building, which houses Sklep Theatre
- Interactive map of Sklep Theatre
- Former names: Kobil klub
- Address: Jasná I 1181/6; Prague; Czechia
- Coordinates: 50°2′26.56680″N 14°24′55.07500″E
- Type: Theatre

Construction
- Years active: 1971–present

Website
- divadlosklep.cz

Sklep Theatre (Czech: Divadlo Sklep) is a theatre in the Czech capital of Prague, founded in 1971 by Milan Šteindler and David Vávra. It is currently based at the Divadlo Dobeška building in Braník.

== History ==
=== Origins ===
Sklep Theatre was originally founded in 1971 by two fourteen-year-olds, Milan Šteindler and David Vávra, in the cellar of Vávra's grandmother's house, under the name Kobil klub. They performed only for friends during the first few years, but in the latter part of the 1970s, their audience began to grow. The ensemble expanded from the initial duo, adding a number of actors, including Tomáš Vorel, Eva Holubová, Tomáš Hanák, Jiří Burda, and František Váša.

=== Divadlo Dobeška ===
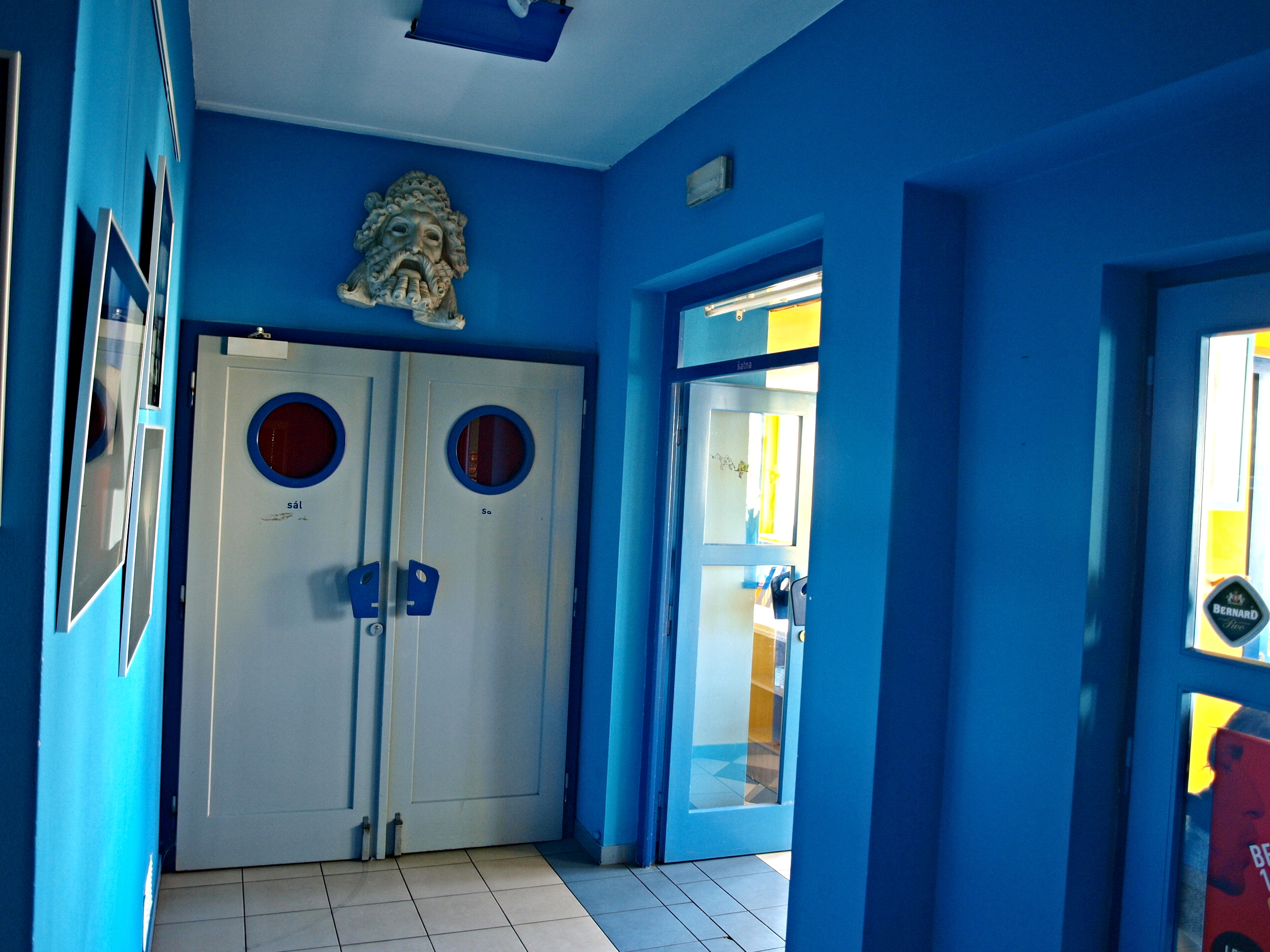
Interior of Divadlo Dobeška

Since 1980, the ensemble has been based at the Dobeška cultural building. During this decade, Sklep developed working relationships with other performing groups, including Recitation Group Vpřed (Czech: Recitační skupina Vpřed), Pantomime Group Mimóza (Czech: Pantomimická skupina Mimóza), Art Theatre Kolotoč (Czech: Výtvarné divadlo Kolotoč), and Ballet Unit Křeč (Czech: Baletní jednotka Křeč). These became known as the Prague Five (Czech: Pražská pětka), and in 1988, they jointly created a film of the same name, directed by Tomáš Vorel.

=== Post-Velvet Revolution ===
After the Velvet Revolution in Czechoslovakia in November 1989, Sklep put together two productions, with which it toured the entire nation: Tajů plný ostrov and Mlýny. The latter is based on Život před sebou, a play by Václav Havel and Karel Brynda.

== Selection of past and current members ==
- Milan Šteindler
- David Vávra
- Tomáš Vorel
- Eva Holubová
- Tomáš Hanák
- Jiří Burda
- František Váša
- Robert Nebřenský
- Václav Marhoul
- Jiří Macháček
- František Skála
- Ondřej Trojan
- Jaroslav Róna
- Ivana Chýlková
