= Rebelové =

2001 Czech musical film by Filip Renč

- Written by: Filip Renč; Zdeněk Zelenka
- Starring: Tomáš Hanák; Zuzana Norisová; Jan Révai
- Release date: 8 February 2001
- Country: Czech Republic
- Language: Czech

Rebelové (international title: Rebels) is a 2001 Czech musical film.

== Plot ==
The story, set in 1968, the year of the Prague Spring and the Soviet invasion, features a planned escape to the West and the arrest of one of its central characters for desertion from the army. The main couple, Tereza and Šimon, struggles to enjoy the free spirit of the times in spite of the turbulent political circumstances.

== Production ==
The musical, written by Filip Renč and Zdeněk Zelenka, was first produced as a film in 2001. The cast included Zuzana Norisová (as Tereza), Jan Révai (as Šimon) and Tomáš Hanák (as Tereza's father).

- Tereza .... Zuzana Norisová
- Šimon .... Jan Révai
- Julča .... Anna Veselá
- Bugyna .... Alžbeta Stanková
- Tereza's Dad .... Tomáš Hanák
- Olda .... Martin Kubačák
- Eman .... Ľuboš Kostelný
- Bob .... Jaromír Nosek
- Priest .... František Němec
- Alžběta .... Soňa Norisová
- Tuřín .... Ondřej Šípek
- Drmola .... Petr Burian
- Douša, Guard in Train .... Stanislav Štepka
- teacher Drtinová .... Helga Čočková
- Alžběta's husband .... Josef Carda
- Major .... Bronislav Poloczek
- Professor .... Jiřina Bohdalová
- Male Singer .... Marcel Švidrman
- Female Singer .... Kateřina Mátlová
- Owner of Shooting Range .... Radana Herrmanová
- Shoe Shopkeeper .... Jan Bursa
- Principal .... Oto Ševčík
- 1st Officer of SNB (State National Safety) .... Jindřich Hrdý
- 2nd Officer of SNB .... Vít Pešina
- Frontier Guard .... Jan Svěrák
- Child .... Oskar Helcl
- Child .... Valerie Šámalová
- TV Editor .... Libuše Štědrá
- Soviet Soldier .... Miroslav Bučkovský
- Trombonist .... Ladislav Beran

== Stage version ==
Norisová, in alternation with Zdenka Trvalcová and Zuzana Vejvodová, also appeared in a stage version, that opened at Prague's Broadway Theatre in September 2003. The role of Šimon was alternated by Zbyněk Fric, Martin Písařík and Ján Slezák.

== Soundtrack ==
The soundtrack was released by Supraphon. It is the highest selling soundtrack album ever in the Czech Republic, as well as the second best selling album in the country between 1994 and 2006. The album is also the highest-selling album in the country in 2001 with 120,000 copies sold.

- Měsíc
- Gina
- Pátá (Down Town)
- Jezdím bez nehod
- Jo, třešně zrály (Jailer, Bring Me the Water)
- Letíme na měsíc
- Š Š Š (Sugar Town)
- Včera neděle byla
- Oliver Twist
- Nej, Nej, Nej
- Mě se líbí Bob (My Boy Lollipop)
- Hvězda na vrbě
- Náhrobní kámen
- Já budu chodit po špičkách
- Stín katedrál
- San Francisco
- Řekni, kdy ty kytky jsou (Where Have All the Flowers Gone)

== See also ==
- 2001 in film
