= Guard No. 47 =

Film by Filip Renč

- Czech poster
- Directed by: Filip Renč
- Written by: Eduard Verner; Josef Kopta
- Produced by: Ilona Jirásková; Jaroslav Kučera
- Starring: Karel Roden
- Cinematography: Karel Fairaisl
- Edited by: Jan Mattlach
- Release date: 27 November 2008
- Running time: 108 minutes
- Country: Czech Republic
- Language: Czech

Guard No. 47 (Czech: Hlídač č. 47) is a 2008 Czech film by director Filip Renč. It is based on the 1926 Josef Kopta novel Guard No. 47, and stars Karel Roden and Lucia Siposová.

The film won three Czech Lion awards and four Golden Reel awards at the Tiburon International Film Festival in 2009.

== Cast ==
- Karel Roden as Frantisek Dousa
- Lucia Siposova as Anicka Dousová
- Václav Jirácek as Ferda
- Vladimír Dlouhý as Bartik
