= Conspirators of Pleasure =

1996 Czech black comedy film

Spiklenci slasti
- Theatrical release poster
- Directed by: Jan Švankmajer
- Written by: Jan Švankmajer
- Produced by: Jaromir Kallista
- Starring: Petr Meissel
- Cinematography: Miroslav Spala
- Edited by: Marie Zemanová
- Music by: Olga Jelinková; Stephen Quay Timothy Quay
- Release dates: August 1996 (Switzerland); 17 October 1996 (Czech Republic)
- Running time: 85 minutes
- Countries: Czech Republic; Switzerland; United Kingdom

Conspirators of Pleasure (Czech: Spiklenci slasti) is a 1996 black comedy film by Jan Švankmajer. His third feature film after Alice and Faust, it was nominated for the Golden Leopard at the Locarno International Film Festival.

== Plot ==
In Prague, Mr. Pivoňka, an unmarried man, buys some pornography from his local newsagent, Mr. Kula, and returns home. A postwoman, Mrs. Malková gives him a letter which reads "On Sunday" in cut-out letters. In secret, she then rolls pieces of bread into little balls and carries them in her satchel. Pivoňka asks his neighbour, Mrs. Loubalová, to slaughter a chicken for him. Using the leftover feathers and papier-mâché made from the pornography, he constructs a chicken head and fabricates wings made from umbrellas. Meanwhile, police captain Weltinský buys rolling pins and pan lids from the same shop that sells Pivoňka's umbrellas. Using these items, plus stolen pieces of fur and sharp things, Weltinský constructs unusual objects in his workshop. His wife, a newsreader named Anna Weltinská, feels neglected and buys some live carp. She is unaware that Kula is in love with her image and has constructed a machine rigged to stroke and masturbate him when she is on television. Pivoňka and Loubalová construct life-size effigies of each other.

On Sunday, Pivoňka drives to the country with his effigy while Loubalová takes her effigy to an abandoned crypt containing a closet, a chair with candles and a basin of water. Loubalová emerges from the closet and whips her straw effigy which, being animated, reacts. Pivoňka dresses in his chicken outfit and struts around his similarly animated effigy, eventually crushing it with a boulder while Loubalová drowns hers in the basin. At home, Malková shoves an unfeasible number of bread balls in her nose and ears and takes a nap. While Weltinská strokes her carp and feeds them the bread balls Malková later delivers, Beltinský strips naked in his workshop and rubs his objects over his body. When Weltinská reads the news, Kula turns on his machine and climaxes at the same time that she does, stimulated by the carp sucking her toes under her desk.

On his way home, Pivoňka is fascinated by Weltinská's image in a television shop window and stops to buy electronic equipment magazines at Kula's shop. Kula is now covering rolling pins with feathers; Malková looks longingly at a carp in a fishmonger's windows. Pivonka discovers that Loubalová has been killed in her flat by a boulder that has seemingly dropped through her roof; Beltinský is investigating. Entering his own flat, Pivonka sees the chair with candles and the basin of water awaiting him. His closet door slowly opens.

== Cast ==
- Petr Meissel as Mr. Pivoňka
- Gabriela Wilhelmová a Mrs. Loubalova
- Barbora Hrzánová as Postmistress
- Anna Wetlinská as Anna Weltinská
- Jiří Lábus as Newspaper Vendor
- Pavel Nový as Mr. Wetlinský

== Reception ==
On Rotten Tomatoes the film has an approval rating of 86% based on reviews from 7 critics.
