= Vrať se do hrobu! =

1990 Czech comedy film

- Directed by: Milan Šteindler
- Written by: Halina Pawlowská; Milan Šteindler
- Starring: Milan Šteindler; Dana Batulková; Klára Pollertová
- Cinematography: Miroslav Cvorsjuk
- Music by: Miloslav Halik
- Release date: 1990
- Country: Czechoslovakia

Vrať se do hrobu! (English title: Ready for the Grave, literally Go back to grave) is a Czech comedy film directed by Milan Šteindler. It was released in 1990.

== Plot ==
Víťa Jakoubek is a mild-mannered, underpaid sociologist in his thirties, living with his wife Jana and their two sons, Jakub and Martin, in a drab housing estate. Trapped in the routine of domestic life—overworked wife, unruly kids, weekends spent laboring at his father-in-law's cottage—Víťa feels unfulfilled. At the research institute where he works, he lacks any meaningful scientific assignment, fueling his growing frustration.

His luck changes when he's finally tasked with an independent research project: a sociological study on the value system of high school seniors. To gain better insight into the mindset of today's youth, Víťa assumes a false identity as a student at a local gymnázium. Mistaken for a late transfer by one of the teachers and accepted into the classroom with the approval of the headmistress, he begins attending classes daily.

Despite his outdated clothes and unassuming looks, Víťa wins over his much younger classmates and even attracts the attention of Eva Málková, the charming class star. Claiming a past illness delayed his studies, Víťa passes as just a few years older than the rest. He enjoys the attention and camaraderie, embracing the double life with increasing enthusiasm. He tells his classmates that his wife is his older sister and instructs his sons not to call him "Dad" in public. His immersion into youth culture leads to several comic situations—students demanding bribes for hints at the blackboard, and a group outing to a disco where older men like Víťa are brushed off with a curt “Go back to your grave!”

The charade begins to strain his real life. Jana grows suspicious and resentful as Víťa distances himself from his family, and a misunderstanding at school leads to a bizarre moment where the new afterschool caretaker refuses to release his own son to him, believing Víťa to be a stranger. Eventually, Jana leaves him and takes the children to her parents’ home.

Despite failing his final exams, Víťa hosts a graduation party for his classmates in his apartment. The celebration culminates in a brief affair with Eva—interrupted when his disapproving mother-in-law catches them in bed. She reveals Víťa's true identity and family status to the shocked students. Eva and the rest of the class feel betrayed and abandon him, with Eva telling him, once again, to “go back to his grave.”

Alone and disgraced, Víťa attempts reconciliation with Jana, who initially rebuffs him. However, a chance encounter in the park—where he finds her sitting in a tree and climbs up to join her—signals a thaw in their relationship. In the final scenes, Víťa returns to work and presents his findings on youth values to his superiors. Impressed, his director assigns him a new project: studying the value system of senior citizens. Víťa sets off to a retirement home, prepared to explore a different generation—this time, hopefully, without needing to pretend.

== Cast ==
- Milan Šteindler as Víťa Jakoubek
- Dana Batulková as Jana Jakoubková, Víťa's wife
- Klára Trojanová-Pollertová as Eva Málková
- Kryštof Koláček as Jakub, Víťa's son
- Matěj Peprník as Martin, Víťa's younger son
- Zdeněk Marek as Holda
- Aleš Machalíček as Polívka
- Jiří Vala as Dr. Brousek
- Věra Vlčková as Headmistress of the grammar school
- Jan Gross as Professor Holub
- Svatava Hubeňáková as Jana's mother (mother-in-law)
- Eva Tauchenová as Professor Tomanová
- Monika Šeligová as Student
- Yvetta Blanarovičová as Secretary
- Halina Pawlowská as Cleaning lady
