= Tobruk (2008 film) =

2008 Czech war film

- Directed by: Václav Marhoul
- Screenplay by: Václav Marhoul
- Produced by: Václav Marhoul
- Starring: Jan Meduna; Petr Vanek
- Distributed by: High Fliers
- Release date: 2008
- Running time: 100 minutes
- Countries: Czech Republic; Slovakia
- Languages: Czech; Slovak

Tobruk is a 2008 film written and directed by Václav Marhoul and starring Jan Meduna and Petr Vanek. It is an adaptation of the classic 1895 American Civil War novel The Red Badge of Courage by Stephen Crane, but transfers the action to North Africa during World War II.

== Plot ==
Jiří and Jan are two Czech soldiers, fighting alongside the Allied forces against the Italians during World War II in Tobruk, Libya. Jiří Pospichal, 18 years old, signs up as a volunteer in the Czechoslovak 11th Infantry Battalion. His naive ideas about heroism are rawly confronted with the hell of the African desert, complicated relationships in his unit and the ubiquitous threat of death. All this takes its cruel toll in the shape of his gradual loss of self-respect and courage.

== Cast ==
- Jan Meduna as Private Pospíchal
- Petr Vanek as Private Lieberman
- Robert Nebřenský as Corporal Kohák
- Krystof Rímský as Private Kutina

== Production ==
The film was co-financed by ČD Cargo, HBO Europe, JCDecaux, Letiště Praha, Respekt, RWE and the Czech Ministry of Defence. It was shot in Tunisia.

== Reception ==
The film was nominated for eight Crystal Lions at the 2009 Czech Lion Ceremony. It won best cinematography (Vladimír Smutný), best score (Richard Horowitz and Sussan Deyhim) and best sound (Pavel Rejholec and Jakub Cech).
