= Thanks for Every New Morning =

Díky za každé nové ráno
- Directed by: Milan Šteindler
- Written by: Halina Pawlowská
- Produced by: Tomáš Chadím; Miloš Fedaš; Karel Czaban
- Starring: Ivana Chýlková; Franciszek Pieczka; Barbora Hrzánová; Alena Vránová; Dagmar Edwards
- Cinematography: Jiří Krejčík Jr.
- Edited by: Věra Flaková
- Music by: Petr Ulrych
- Release date: 3 November 1994
- Running time: 100 minutes
- Country: Czech Republic
- Languages: Czech; Hebrew; Ukrainian

Thanks for Every New Morning (Czech: Díky za každé nové ráno) is a 1994 Czech film directed by Milan Šteindler. It was the Czech Republic's submission to the 68th Academy Awards for the Academy Award for Best Foreign Language Film, but was not accepted as a nominee.

== Cast and characters ==
- Ivana Chýlková as Olga
- Franciszek Pieczka as father
- Barbora Hrzánová as Lenka
- Alena Vránová as mother
- Halina Pawlowská as Vasilina
- Milan Šteindler as StB officer
- Jiří Langmajer as Honza
- Karel Heřmánek as Orest
- Tomáš Hanák as Lesik
- Petr Čepek as famous writer
- Miroslav Etzler as Mirek
- Szidi Tobias as Romka

== Awards ==
Year	Nominated work	Award(s)	Category	Result
1995	Díky za každé nové ráno	Febiofest - Czech Critics Award	Best Film	Won
1995	Díky za každé nové ráno	Czech Lions	Best Film	Won
1995	Halina Pawlowská	Czech Lions	Best Screenplay	Won
1995	Franciszek Pieczka	Czech Lions	Best Actor in Leading Role	Nominated
1995	Ivana Chýlková	Czech Lions	Best Actress in Leading Role	Won
1995	Barbora Hrzánová	Czech Lions	Best Supporting Actress	Nominated
1995	Milan Šteindler	Czech Lions	Best Director	Won
1995	Milan Šteindler	Moscow IFF - Silver St. George	Best Director	Won

== See also ==
- List of submissions to the 68th Academy Awards for Best Foreign Language Film
- List of Czech submissions for the Academy Award for Best Foreign Language Film
