= Petr Čtvrtníček =

Czech actor and comedian

- Petr Čtvrtníček in 2014
- Born: 5 April 1964 (age 62); Prague, Czechoslovakia
- Occupations: Actor, Comedian
- Years active: 1986–present

Petr Čtvrtníček (born 5 April 1964 in Prague) is a Czech actor and comedian.

== Selected filmography ==
- Kouř (1991)
- Fany (1995)
- Tomík (1997)
- Mazaný Filip (2003)
- Ivánku, kamaráde, můžeš mluvit? aneb Tak to mi ho teda vyndej (2005)
- Obsluhoval jsem anglického krále (2006)
- František je děvkař (2008)
- Anděl Páně 2 (2016)
- Pohádky pro Emu (2016)

=== TV series ===
- Česká soda (1993)
- Gynekologie 2 (2007)
- Alles Gute (2009)
- Autobazar Monte Karlo (2015)
- Přístav (2015)
- Krejzovi (2018)

=== Voice ===
- Kuky se vrací (2010)
- Lajka (2017)
