= Václav Marhoul =

Czech filmmaker (born 1960)

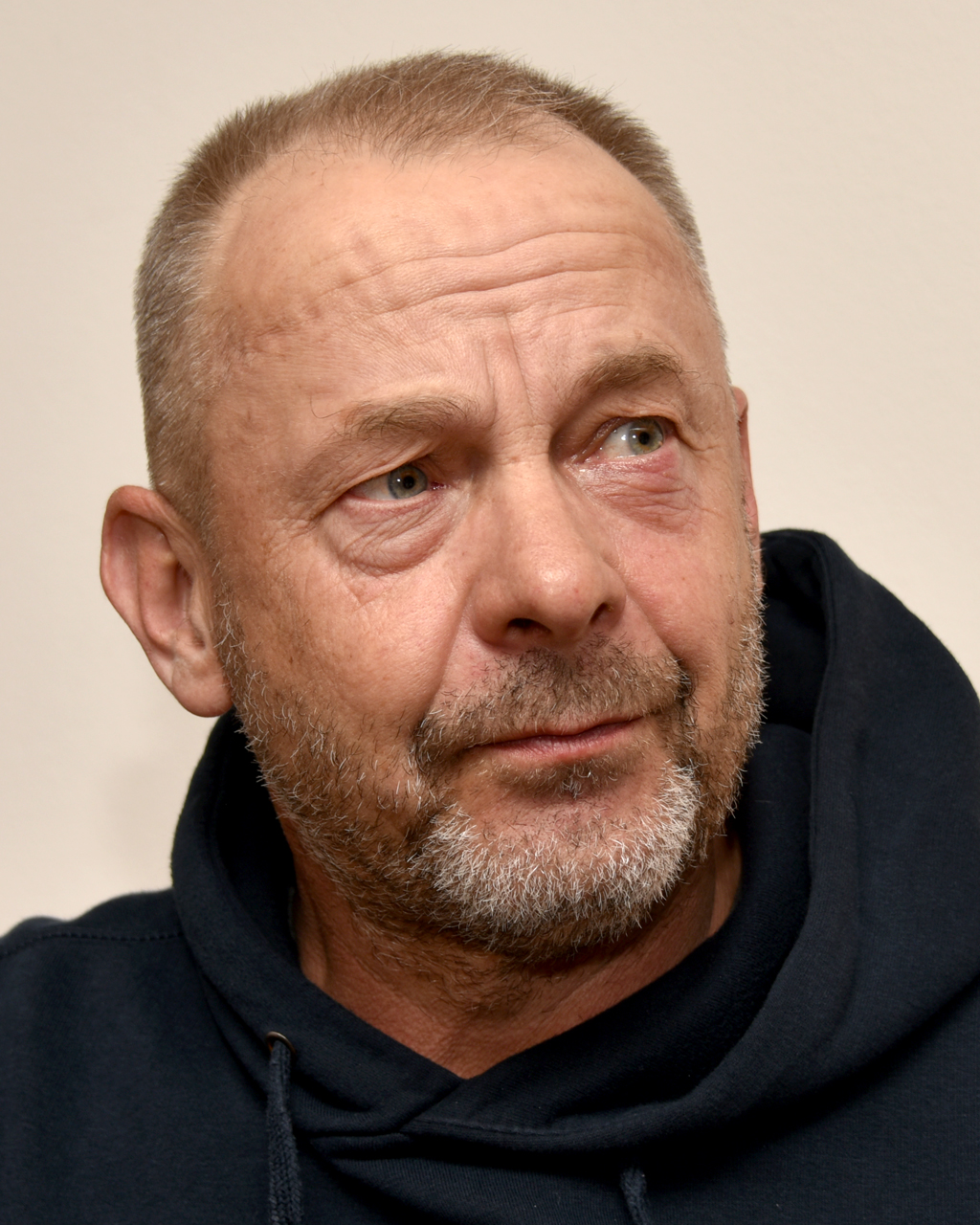
- Marhoul in 2019
- Born: 30 January 1960 (age 66); Prague, Czechoslovakia
- Education: FAMU
- Occupations: Filmmaker, actor
- Years active: 1991–present

Václav Marhoul (Czech pronunciation: [ˈvaːtslaf ˈmarɦoul]; born 30 January 1960) is a Czech filmmaker and actor best known for his war-drama film The Painted Bird (2019).

== Early life and career ==
He studied at Prague's FAMU, graduating in 1984. He directed his first film Smart Philip, based on Raymond Chandler's books, in 2003. In 2008, his second film Tobruk was premiered. His third feature film The Painted Bird, based on Jerzy Kosiński's novel of the same title, premiered at the 76th Venice International Film Festival.

He also starred in several films such as Gympl (2007), Ulovit miliardáře (2009) and Cesta do lesa (2012).

=== Upcoming projects ===
As of 2021, he planned his English-language debut with a biographical film about Joseph McCarthy, with Michael Shannon in the lead role, and co-starring Emilia Clarke, Dane DeHaan and Scoot McNairy.

== Filmography ==
=== Feature films ===
| Year | English title | Original title | Notes |
|---|---|---|---|
| 2003 | Smart Philip | Mazaný Filip | |
| 2008 | Tobruk | | |
| 2019 | The Painted Bird | Nabarvené ptáče | |
| 2026 | Confession | Doznání | |

=== Acting credits ===
- Gympl (2007)
- Ulovit miliardáře (2009)
- Cesta do lesa (2012)
