= The Ride (1994 film) =

- Directed by: Jan Svěrák
- Written by: Martin Dostal; Jan Svěrák
- Produced by: Klara Bukovska; Marketa Hajkova; Přemysl Pražský
- Starring: Anna Geislerová; Radek Pastrňák; Filip Renč
- Cinematography: F.A. Brabec
- Edited by: Alois Fišárek
- Music by: Buty; Radek Pastrnák
- Production company: Luxor
- Release date: 13 September 1994
- Running time: 90 minutes
- Country: Czech Republic
- Language: Czech
- Budget: 1 Million CZK

The Ride (Czech: Jízda) is a 1994 Czech drama film directed by Jan Svěrák.

== Cast ==
- Anna Geislerová as Anna
- Radek Pastrnák as Radek
- Filip Renč as Honzík
- Jakub Špalek as Franta

== Awards ==
- 1995 Crystal Globe (Grand Prix)
