= Robert Nebřenský =

Czech actor and musician

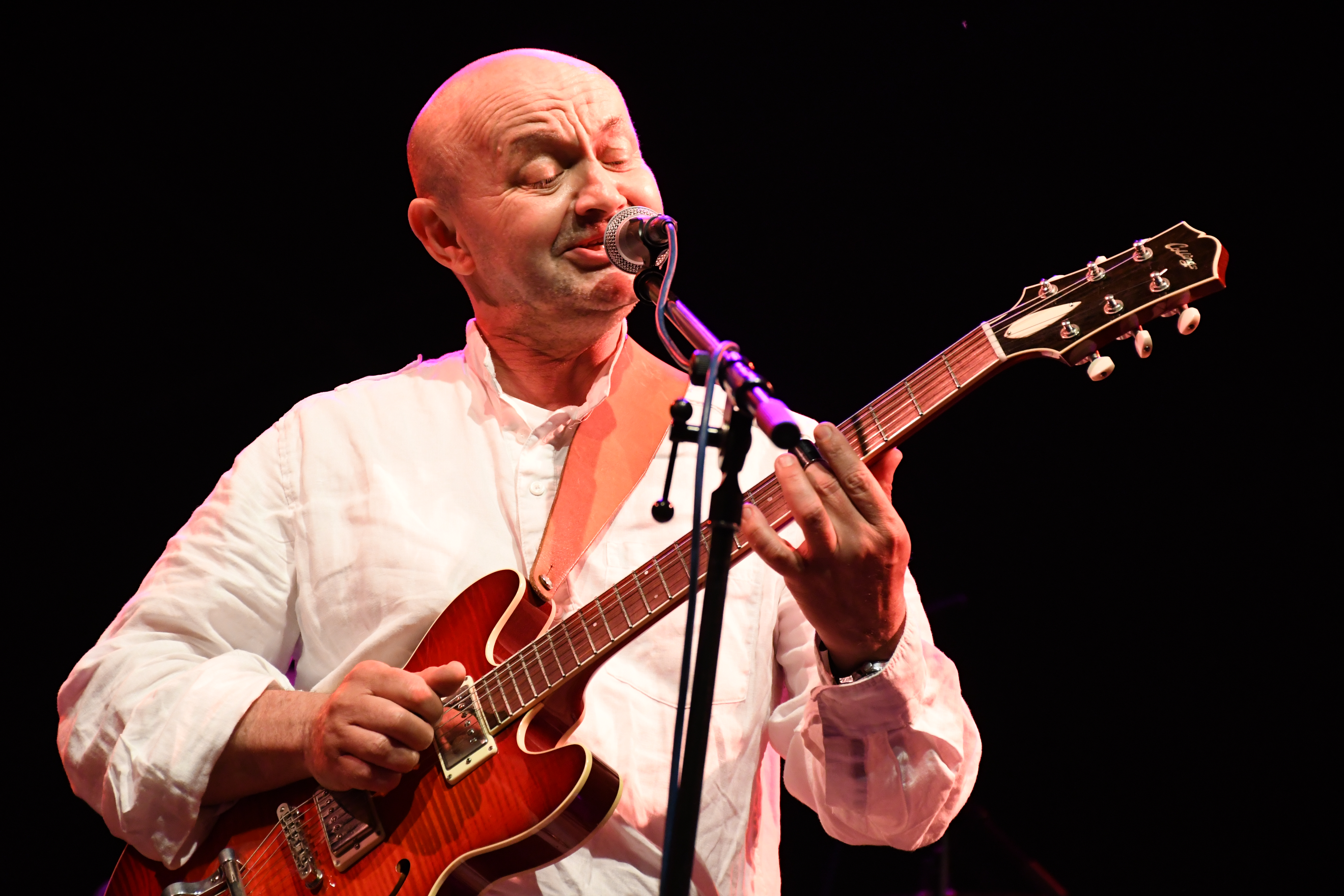
- Nebřenský in 2018
- Born: 8 February 1964 (age 62); Prague, Czechoslovakia
- Occupations: Actor; musician; comedian; songwriter
- Years active: 1986–present
- Website: nebrensky.cz

Robert Nebřenský (born 8 February 1964) is a Czech actor, musician, comedian, songwriter, and composer.

In years 1986–2002 and since 2010 to this day, Nebřenský has been active in Czech rock music band Vltava. In the beginnings of his career, he collaborated with popular Czech theatre Sklep. He is currently playing in films (such as Tobruk), and writing songs for other musicians.

== Filmography ==
- 1991 – Penziónek (TV film)
- 1994 – Historky od krbu (TV serial), Mlýny (TV film)
- 1998 – Multicar Movie Show
- 2003 – Mazaný Filip
- 2004 – Nadměrné maličkosti: Nehoda (TV film), Na stojáka (TV show)
- 2005 – Bazén (TV serial)
- 2006 – Letiště (TV serial), Prachy dělaj člověka, Rádio Kebrle, Ro(c)k podvraťáků
- 2007 – La Vie en rose, Dame d'Izieu, La (TV serial), Gynekologie 2 (TV serial), O život, Princezna z Kloboukových hor (TV serial), Trapasy (TV serial)
- 2008 – Tobruk, The Red Baron, Hvězdný reportér (TV show)
- 2009 – Vyprávěj (TV serial), Alles Gute (TV show)

=== Documents ===
- 1991 – Míč (TV film)
