= Václav (film) =

- Directed by: Jiří Vejdělek
- Written by: Marek Epstein; Jiří Vejdělek
- Produced by: Jaroslav Bouček
- Starring: Ivan Trojan; Emília Vášáryová; Jan Budař; Soňa Norisová; Jiří Lábus
- Narrated by: Tomáš Kudrna
- Cinematography: Jakub Šimůnek
- Edited by: Jan Daňhel
- Music by: Jan P. Muchow
- Production company: BUC Film
- Distributed by: SPI International
- Release date: 5 December 2007
- Running time: 97 minutes
- Country: Czech Republic
- Language: Czech

Václav is a Czech drama film, directed by Jiří Vejdělek in 2007.

It tells the story of an adult autistic man living on a collective farm during the transition from communism to democracy in the 1990s.

== Cast ==
- Ivan Trojan as Václav Vingl
- Emília Vášáryová as Václav's mother
- Jan Budař as František
- Soňa Norisová as Lída
- Jiří Lábus as chief magistrate
- Petra Špalková as Majka
- Martin Pechlát as Father
- Martina Delišová as young mother
- Jan Vlasák as Pilecký
- Zuzana Kronerová as hostelry
- Gregor Bauer as little Václav
- Hynek Bečka as little František
- Miroslav Moravec - voice of little Václav's
- Jan Šťastný - voice of little František
