= Vienna Film Commission =

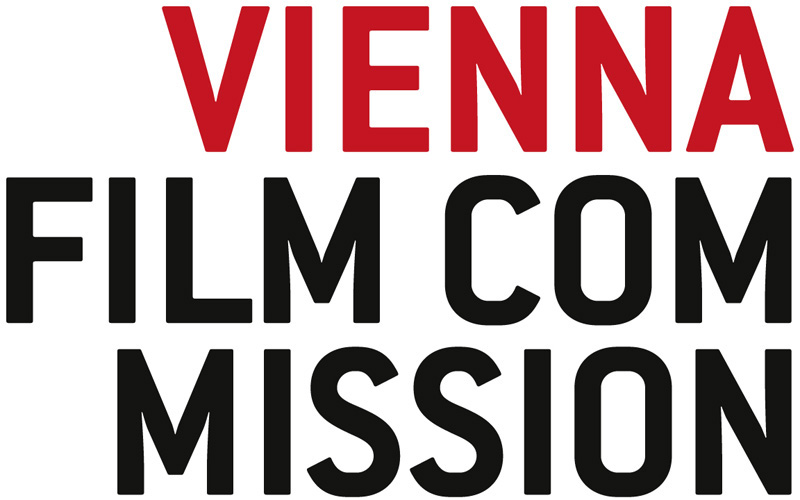
Vienna Film Commission Logo.jpg

The Vienna Film Commission is a non-profit organization dedicated to promoting the local film industry. As a free of charge service by the City of Vienna it supports national and international film and TV productions that aim to shoot feature films, TV shows, documentaries, commercials or student films in Vienna.

== History ==
The Vienna Film Commission was founded in February 2009 as a non-profit joint venture of the Cultural Department of the City (MA 7), the Vienna Film Fund, the Vienna Tourist Board, the Vienna Business Agency, the Vienna Economic Chamber and the Press and Information Services.

The Commission consists of five members, led by Managing Director Marijana Stoisits. Marijana Stoisits is a member of the European Film Academy and second vice chairwoman in the board of directors of the Association of Film Commissioners International (AFCI).

The Advisory Committee of the Vienna Film Commission, the Vienna Film Board, is made up of representatives of each of the five sponsoring organizations.

Since July 2009, the Vienna Film Commission has been based in the Media Quarter Marx in the third municipal District of Vienna.

== Tasks ==
The Vienna Film Commission has three main tasks:

1. to act as an interface between the Vienna City Administration and the film industry, especially for the granting of film permits
2. to support production companies in looking for qualified locations and service partners within the industry in Vienna
3. to lobby for the film industry and to promote Vienna worldwide as a film location

== International Productions in Vienna ==
- Mission: Impossible – Rogue Nation (USA 2014)
- Woman in Gold (USA/UK, 2014)
- Ae Dil Hai Mushkil (India 2015)
- Rush (USA/UK, 2013)
- Let me go (UK 2016)
- Covert Affairs, NBC (USA 2013)
- The Grimm, NBC (USA, 2013)
- Em Familia (Brazil, 2013)
- The Best Offer (Italy, 2012)
- A beautiful Affair (Philippines, 2012)
- 360 (UK/US/A 2011)
- First Love (Egypt, 2011)
- A Dangerous Method (USA/UK, 2011)
- Pillars of the Earth (USA, 2010)
- Namo Venkatesa (India, 2009)
- The Piano Teacher (France, 2001)
- The Three Musketeers (USA, 1993)
- Before Sunrise (USA, 1995)
- James Bond 007 – The Living Daylights (UK, 1987)
- Scorpio (USA, 1973)
- The Third Man (UK, 1949)

== Memberships ==
- European Film Commission Network (EUFCN)
- Association of Film Commissioners International (AFCI)
