= Didier Lavergne =

French make-up artist

- Occupation: makeup artist
- Years active: 1971-present

Didier Lavergne is a French make-up artist. He won an Academy Award for Best Makeup as well as a BAFTA Award for Best Makeup for his work in La Vie en rose (2007).
