= Milan Šteindler =

Czech actor, screenwriter, and director (born 1957)

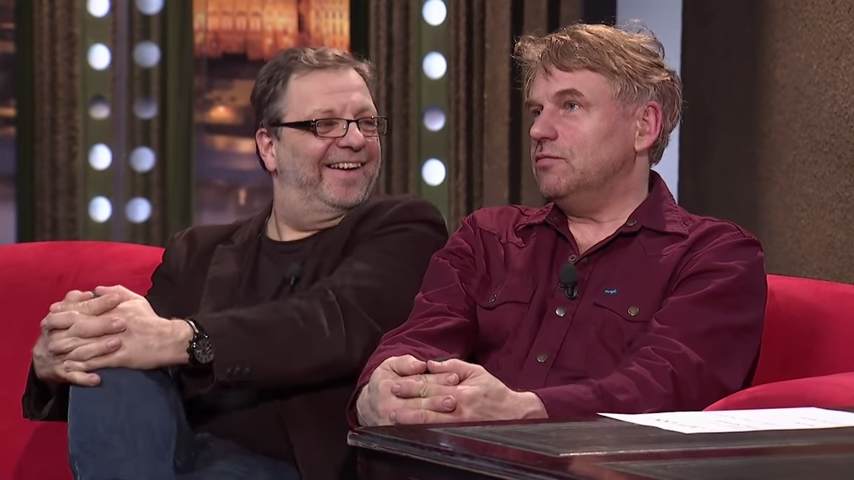
- Šteindler (left) with Tomáš Vorel in 2016
- Born: 12 April 1957 (age 69); Prague, Czechoslovakia
- Education: Academy of Performing Arts in Prague
- Occupations: Film director, actor
- Years active: 1975–present
- Known for: Thanks for Every New Morning; Sklep Theatre

Milan Šteindler (born 12 April 1957) is a Czech actor, screenwriter and film director. He is a graduate of the Academy of Performing Arts in Prague. He won the Czech Lion Award for Best Director for his 1994 film, Thanks for Every New Morning. He obtained the Silver St. George Award for Directing at the 19th Moscow International Film Festival for the same film.

Together with David Vávra, he founded Sklep Theatre in Prague in 1971.

Along with Petr Čtvrtníček and Vávra, Šteindler wrote and directed the satirical television series Czech Soda.

== Selected filmography ==
List of credits, with year, title, and function shown
Year	Title	Functioned as				Notes	Ref(s)
Year	Title	Actor	Director	Screenwriter	Role	Notes	Ref(s)
1985	My Sweet Little Village	Yes	No	No	Turek's co-driver		
1986	Rosa Luxemburg	No	Assistant director	No	N/A		
1988	Pražská pětka	Yes	No	No	Supervisor		
1989	A Hoof Here, a Hoof There	Yes	No	No	Old man		
1990	Vrať se do hrobu!	Yes	Yes	Yes	Víta Jakoubek		
1993	Stalingrad	No	Assistant director	No	N/A		
1993–1998	Czech Soda	Yes	Yes	Yes	Various	Television show	
1994	Thanks for Every New Morning	Yes	Yes	No	Member of StB police		
1995	Brother of Sleep	No	Assistant director	No	N/A		
2000	Out of the City	Yes	No	No	Hunter		
2003	Mazaný Filip	Yes	No	No	Psychiatrist		
2004	Skřítek	Yes	No	No	Slaughterhouse administrator		
2005–2008	Dobrá čtvrť	Yes	No	No	School janitor	Television series – 14 episodes	
2006	Rafťáci	Yes	No	No	Dany's father		
2007	Gympl	Yes	No	No	Physics teacher Milan		
2012	Goat Story 2	Yes	No	No		Voice	

== Awards and recognition ==
- Czech Lion Award for Best Director for Thanks for Every New Morning, 1994
- Silver St. George Award for Directing, Moscow International Film Festival, 1995
