= Little Girl Blue (2007 film) =

- Directed by: Alice Nellis
- Written by: Alice Nellis
- Starring: Iva Bittová; Karel Roden
- Music by: blue film jindilivd live
- Release date: 17 May 2007
- Running time: 93 minutes
- Country: Czech Republic
- Language: Czech

Little Girl Blue (Czech: Tajnosti) is a 2007 Czech drama film written and directed by Alice Nellis. The film was awarded "Best Film" at the Czech Lion awards for 2007.

== Cast ==
- Iva Bittová as Julie
- Karel Roden as Richard
- Martha Issová as Cecílie
- Miloslav König as Piano shopkeeper
- Ivan Franek as Karele
- Natálie Drabiscáková as Ardana
- Kamila Vondrová as Denisa
- Igor Chmela as Young Man
- Miroslav Krobot as Gynaecologist
- Sabina Remundová as Young Woman
- Anna Šišková as Real estate agent
- Doubravka Svobodová
