= Alice Nellis =

Czech filmmaker (born 1971)

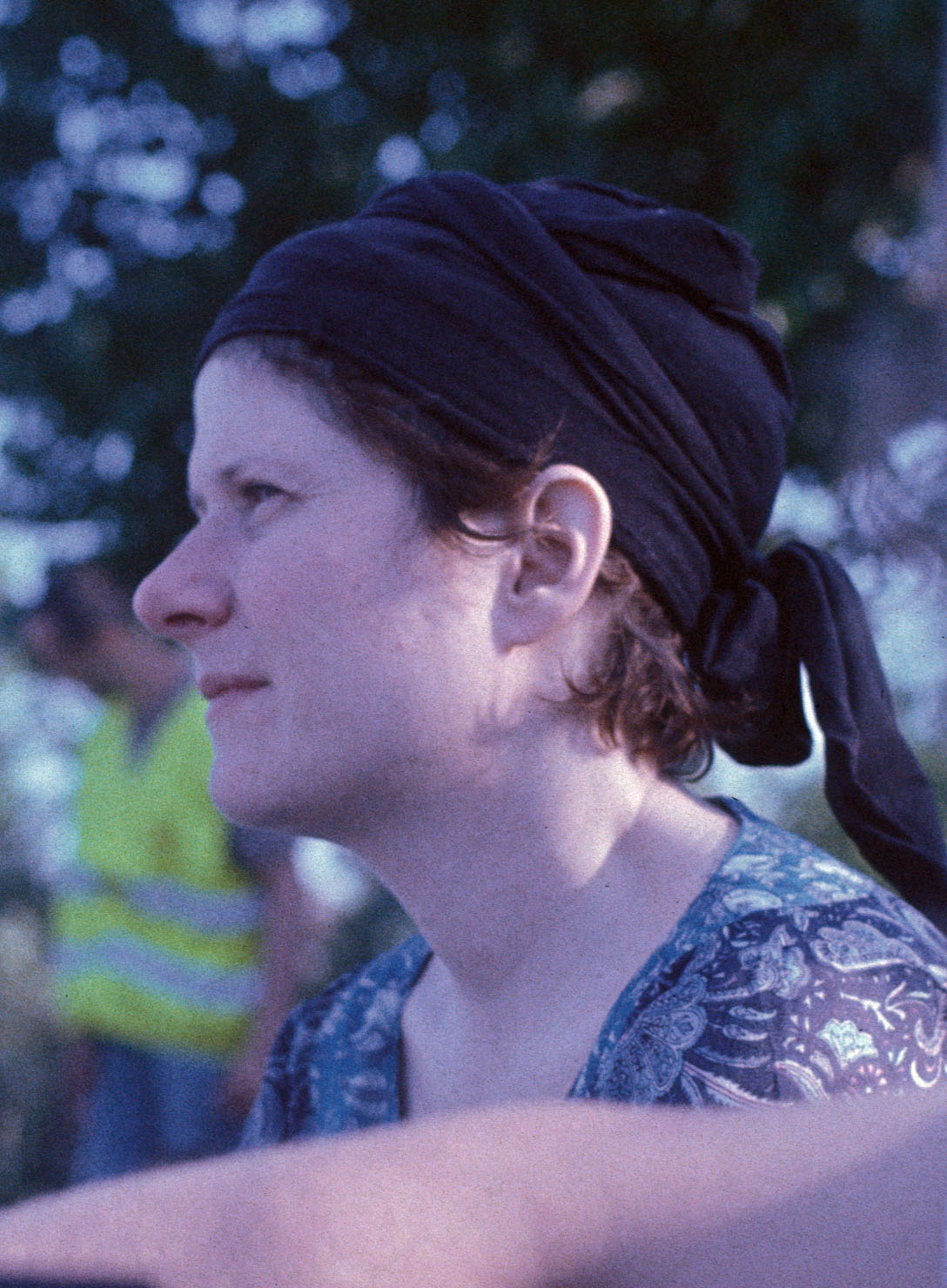
Alice Nellis

Alice Nellis (born 3 January 1971 in České Budějovice) is a Czech filmmaker.

Nellis first worked as a flautist before studying English literature and American literature. In 1996–2001 she studied scriptwriting and dramaturgy at FAMU. She worked temporarily as a web designer for the Czech Ministry of Foreign Affairs, as a teacher, actress, translator and was filming short films and TV documentaries. Her first feature film (directed and scripted) Eeny meeny (2000) won the screenplay award of the FAMU Festival. Her 2002 film Some Secrets won the Czech Lion Award for Best Screenplay and the critics award.

== Films ==
- 1997: Objevte svoji vnitřní krásu (student film)
- 1998: To je Balkán (student film)
- 2000: Eeny Meeny (Ene bene)
- 2002: Some Secrets (Výlet)
- 2005: The City of the Sun (Sluneční stát)
- 2007: Little Girl Blue (Tajnosti)
- 2010: Mamas & Papas
- 2011: Perfect Days (Subtitled as I ženy mají své dny)
- 2013: Revival
- 2013: Innocent Lies (Nevinné lži, TV show)
- 2014: Angels (Andělé všedního dne, based on a Michal Viewegh's book)
- 2015: The Seven Ravens (Sedmero krkavců, based on a Božena Němcová's tale)
- 2016: Wasteland (Pustina, TV series)
- 2022: Buko
