= Filip Renč =

Czech director, screenwriter and actor (born 1965)

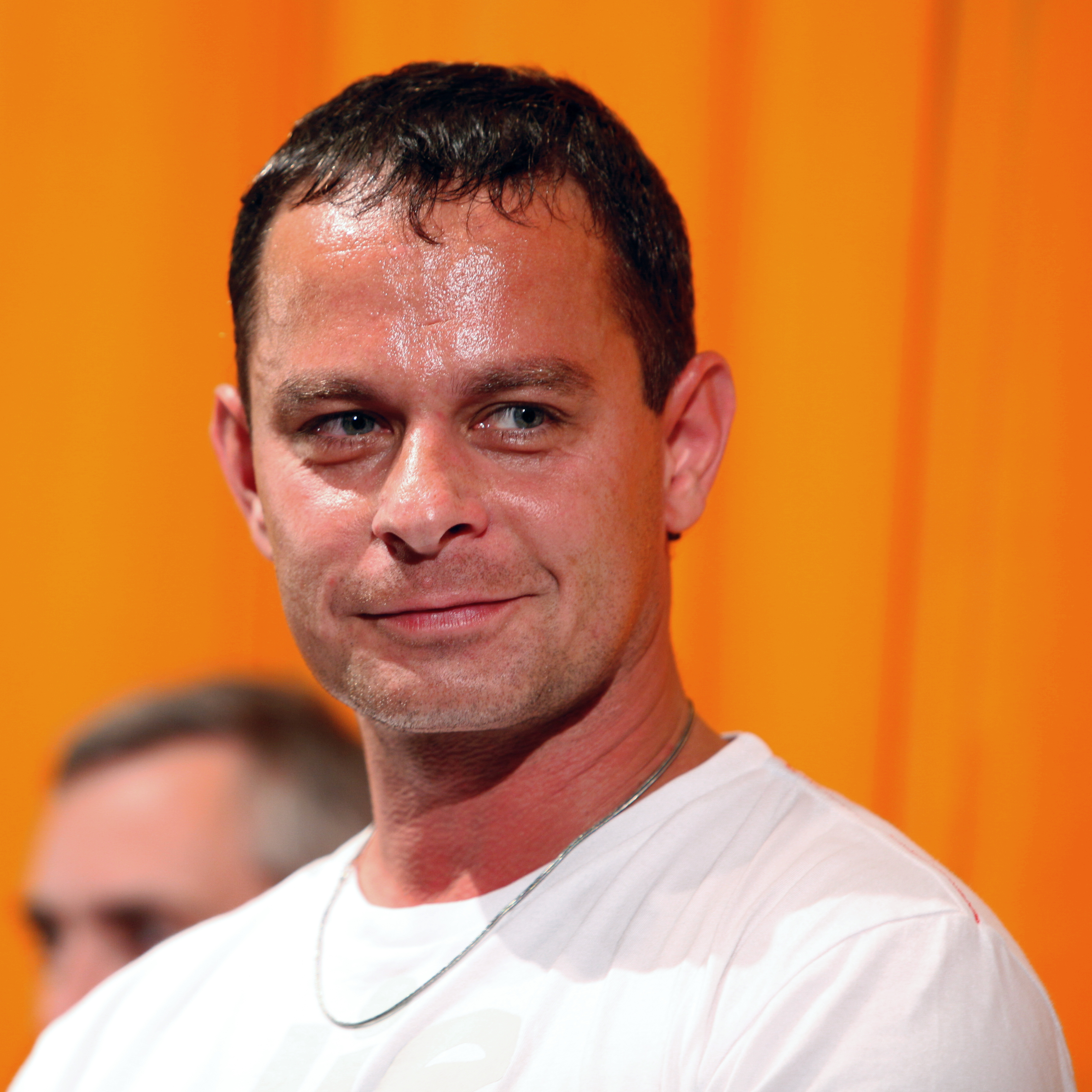
- Renč in 2009
- Born: 17 August 1965 (age 60); Prague, Czechoslovakia
- Occupations: Film director; screenwriter; actor
- Years active: 1978–present
- Spouse: Marie Kružíková (2017–present)
- Children: Natálie
- Awards: Medal of Merit (2014)

Filip Renč (born 17 August 1965) is a Czech film director, screenwriter and actor.

== Biography ==
Filip Renč was born in Prague, Czechoslovakia. Since his childhood, he already proved his enthusiasm for movies and drama. As a young boy he appeared in several movies, including Julek (1980) and Levé křídlo (1983). During his studies at Film and TV School of The Academy of Performing Arts in Prague he created documentaries (Zapadákov, Srdíčko) for which he was awarded at the International film schools festival in 1987 and 1988. His debut movie Requiem pro panenku was also a great success at the Czechoslovak film festival FORUM in Bratislava. In the following years he directed a number of successful movies, including From Subway with Love (2005) and his latest piece At Your Own Risk (2008) which has just recently been released. He directed not only movies but also TV commercials and even music videos. He also wrote screenplays which he later directed himself, such as Rebelové (2001), Válka barev (1993) and Requiem pro panenku (1991). Filip Renč made numerous appearances as an actor, for an instance, in The Ride (1991) and even his own Requiem pro panenku (1991).

== Achievements ==
Renč achieved great success with his movie Rebelové. In 2001, he won the Bonton Company Award and the Children's Jury Main Prize in the Feature Film - Youth category with this movie. The Rebels also won him the Audience Award in the Most Popular Film category and Filip Renč was nominated together with Daniel Dvořák for Best Art Direction at the Czech Lion awards. His movie adaptation of Michal Viewegh's From Subway with Love (original title Román pro ženy), was also well received by critics and by the public. In 2006, the movie From Subway with Love received two nominations - for the Best Film Poster and for the Best Supporting Actress (Simona Stašová) at the Czech Lion Awards. This movie also won Filip Renč the Box Office Award in the same year.

== Filmography ==
=== Direction ===
- 1991 Requiem pro panenku
- 1993 Válka barev
- 1999 Polojasno
- 2001 Rebelové
- 2005 From Subway with Love
- 2008 Guard No. 47
- 2008 At Your Own Risk
- 2016 The Devil's Mistress

=== Screenplays ===
- 1991 Requiem pro panenku
- 1993 Válka barev
- 2001 Rebelové

=== Acting ===
- 1978 Leave Me Alone (Nechci nic slyšet)
- 1980 Julek
- 1983 The Wanderings of Jan Amos
- 1986 Papilio
- 1991 Requiem for a Maiden
- 1991 The Ride
- 1996 Kolya
- 2001 Dark Blue World
- 2007 Empties
