= Jaroslav Weigel =

Czech actor, writer and painter (1931–2019)

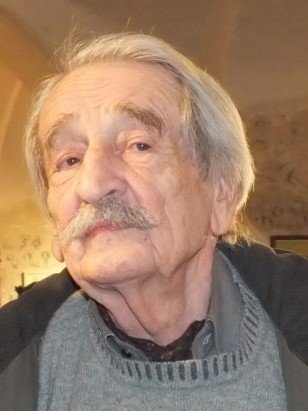
Jaroslav Weigel in 2017

Jaroslav Weigel (2 January 1931 Rychnov nad Kněžnou – 5 September 2019 Prague) was a Czech actor, writer, playwright, comics writer and painter. From 1970, he was a member of the Jára Cimrman Theatre.

== Biography ==
Weigel studied at the Faculty of Education of the Charles University in Prague. After his graduation, he began working as an editor in various magazines, most notably in Mladý svět (from 1959 to 69). In 1972, he collaborated with the illustrator Kája Saudek on the comics series Lips Tullian. He appeared in minor roles in the films of his colleagues from the theatre, Ladislav Smoljak and Zdeněk Svěrák. He is known mainly for his roles in the Jára Cimrman Theatre.

== Filmography and theatre ==
The list is based on the information of the Czech and Slovak Film Database.

- České nebe: Cimrmanův dramatický kšaft (theatre, 2010)
- 40 let Divadla Járy Cimrmana aneb Ze hry do hry (theatre, 2007)
- Vratné lahve (2006)
- Afrika aneb Češi mezi lidožravci (theatre, 2002)
- Případy detektivní kanceláře Ostrozrak (TV series, 2000)
- Blaník (theatre, 1998)
- Na lavici obžalovaných justice (TV series)
- Vražda v salonním coupé (theatre)
- Akt (theatre, 1997)
- Dobrodružství pod postelí (TV film)
- Lijavec (theatre)
- Vyšetřování ztráty třídní knihy (theatre)
- Draculův švagr (TV series, 1996)
- Černobílá pohádka (TV film, 1994)
- Pražský student (TV series, 1991)
- Tvrdý chleba (TV film, 1990)
- Oznamuje se láskám vašim (1988)
- Nejistá sezóna (1987)
- Dobytí severního pólu (1985)
- Rozpuštěný a vypuštěný (1984)
- Jára Cimrman, ležící, spící (1983)
- Vrchní, prchni! (1980)
- Kulový blesk (1978)
- Posel z Liptákova (theatre, 1977)
- Marečku, podejte mi pero! (1976)
- Na samotě u lesa
- Dlouhý, široký a krátkozraký (theatre, 1974)
- Jáchyme, hoď ho do stroje!

=== Documentary ===
- Záskok aneb Cimrman v Národním divadle (TV film, 2000)
