= Dobytí severního pólu =

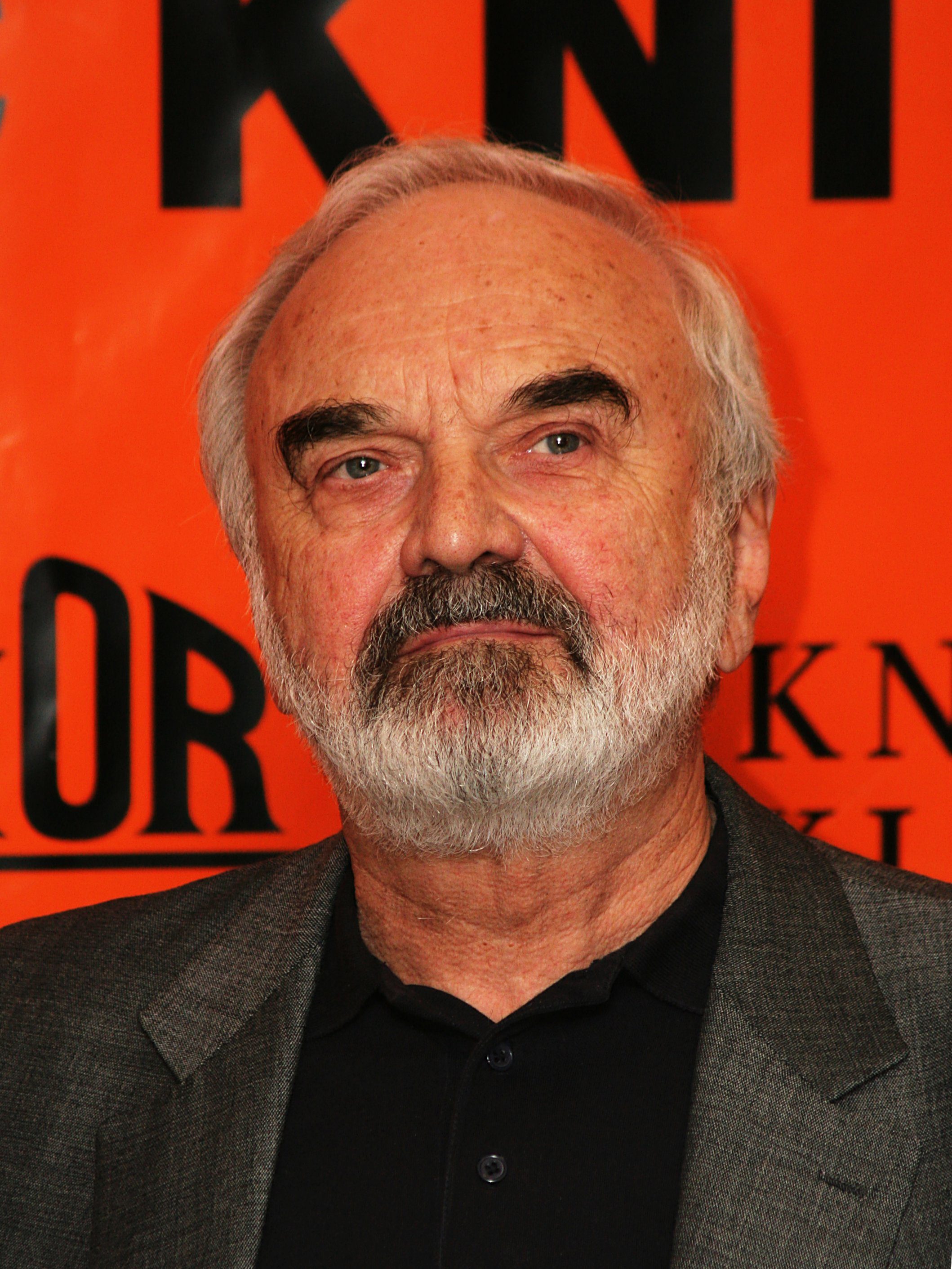
Zdeněk Svěrák, one of the authors of Dobytí severního pólu

Dobytí severního pólu (full title: Dobytí severního pólu Čechem Karlem Němcem 5. dubna 1909, in English: The Conquest of the North Pole by the Czech Karel Němec on 5 April 1909) is a comedy written allegedly by fictional Czech polymath, Jára Cimrman. Its real authors are Zdeněk Svěrák and Ladislav Smoljak. The work was premiered on 25 October 1985 in Divadlo Jiřího Wolkera in Prague.

The play is about a fictional Czech Arctic expedition who conquered the North Pole one day before Robert Peary. As with the other plays supposedly authored by Cimrman, it satirizes Czech national psychology and patriotic clichés, using many puns, historical hoaxes and the distancing effect. It was published as a book, CD, DVD and VHS, and was translated into English by Craig Cravens and by Emilia Machalová and Brian Stewart. The premiere of the Machalová and Stewart version of Conquest of The North Pole was premiered on April 16, 2016, at the Jára Cimrmana Theatre in Prague and continues to be performed regularly in Prague. As with their previous translation of another Cimrman classic, The Stand-In, Záskok, the Machalová and Stewart version aims to stay closer to the original Czech text.

== Plot ==
=== Lectures ===
As all the other "Cimrman's" plays, the performance begins with several fictional lectures about Jára Cimrman's life and work, parodying phrases and clichées of literary criticism.

The first of them is a recitation of Jára Cimrman's poem "Má školní brašnička" (My School Satchel), interrupted by (fictional) latecomers, the second one (fictional) "testing" of a new stage technician Roman Měcháček, who unsuccessfully strives to open the curtain.

The other five fake lectures deals with Jára Cimrman's Arctic expeditions, his anthropological explorations among the Inuit and especially his discovery of "Arctic Snow Man", something like Arctic Yeti, and its bizarre psychology and reproduction, with Cimrman's (fictional) autobiographical play "Přetržené dítě" or "Přetržené nitě" (Severed Child / Torn Threads) and its (fictional) unsuccessful performance. (Cravens’ translation omits this passage entirely, because it is based on untranslatable Czech puns and jokes about Czech-Slovak relations) At first look, the passage does seem untranslatable but Brian Caspe, a member of the Cimrman English Theatre, came up with a version that captures the essence of the original idea. In the lecture, the audience is told about a Cimrman play - 'The Abused Child' which was presented by one of his colleagues but, because of the content, it was not very well received and severely criticised. However, it transpires that when Cimrman was dictating his play to a semi-literate peasant, he was suffering from a very bad respiratory infection and a blocked nose so that normal sounds, such as an M, sound like a B; and a N sound becomes a D. The semi-illiterate peasant wrote down what he thought he heard. Once Cimrman's condition at the time of dictation had been recognised, it was very easy to revise the text so that 'The Abused Child' becomes 'The Amused Child'.

The last three lectures deal with Cimrman's (fictional) tableaux vivants (in Cravens’ translation „still life“, in Czech „živý obraz“ – „living picture“).

=== Play ===
Four Czech winter swimmers, members of Sokol, chief Karel Němec ("Němec" is Czech for "German"),[ In the Prague version the name of Deutsch was used instead of' Němec'] teaching assistant Václav Poustka, pharmacian Vojtěch Šofr and "savage" Varel Frištenský (hidden pun - "Varel" sounds like one of the most common Czech male names, "Karel", however, vocative "Varle" means "testicle"; [ In the Prague version they used the named of Boleslav which can be reduced to the diminutive Bolek and then with little Bolek sounds like bollock which in British English means testicle] Gustav Frištenský was a famous Czech wrestler; Richard Schwarzenegger in Cravens' translation), strong, but childish man, used as a draft dog, decide to conquer the North Pole.

The play consists from several scenes, connected together by teacher's 'reading of travel journal'. In the beginning they get off the train somewhere in Russia, discussing the dangers caused by forgetting of a football. Karel Němec states that the most of polar expeditions die because of melancholia (which was supposed to be dispelled by football).

In the second scene, the group, drifting on an iceberg to the North Pole, is attacked by melancholia. The teacher strives to cheer them up by patriotic song, but it makes the situation even worse and the other members of the group decide to go back: "To Prague! To the pharmacy! To Podolí! … To hell, I’m sad!". The teacher decides to use even more powerful way how to distract his friends and surprises them wearing penguin costume. Frištenský, who does not know that penguins live in Antarctica, shoots him and the teacher is affected by melancholia too. However, aurora borealis dispels all the depression and energizes them again.

In the third scene, Karel Němec tells to his friends that they have no food and proposes to his friends 'to eat the dogs'. However, none of the group is able to kill Frištenský, and the group decides to let him freeze to death because of 'our humanist ideals'. When they strive to persuade Frištenský to take off his clothes, they find a goose in his clothes. Frištenský had talked about it all the time, when his friends complained about hunger, but they had ignored him ("houser" means both gander, male goose and lumbago; "cock" in Cravens' translation).

In the fourth scene, the polar expedition is troubled by chillness and the members strives to evoke the warm atmosphere through discussion about stoves. Later, they find two frozen members of polar expedition of professor Mac Donald and his Czech American valet "Lieutenant of Biology" Beran (Beran means "ram", Koláč in Cravens' translation).

In the fifth scene, they finally arrive to the North Pole. They are very enthusiastic, but hungry. The chief reveals that they have no food for the way back. Therefore they are forced to roast the frozen Beran, but after warming, he comes back to life and explains that their polar expedition was in fact a cryogenic experiment. He is disappointed by fact that his compatriots brought him back to life as early as one year after freezing and joins to their way back to Prague.

The play ends with tableau vivant Češi na severním pólu (Czechs at the North Pole) and short speech, explaining later fate of Czech polar expedition - Czechs will not announce their conquest, because their success would be attributed to Austria. Frištenský will reveal the fact to the doctors in mental asylum, but he will be not taken seriously.

== Characters ==
- Karel Němec – Bořivoj Penc, Genadij Rumlena, Jan Hraběta, Jan Kašpar
- Václav Poustka – Zdeněk Svěrák, Jaroslav Weigel
- Varel Frištenský – Marek Šimon, Jan Hraběta, Ladislav Smoljak
- Vojtěch Šofr – Petr Brukner, Miloň Čepelka, Petr Reidinger, Jaroslav Vozáb
- Czech American Beran – Marek Šimon, Genadij Rumlena, Pavel Vondruška, Jaroslav Vozáb

(names in italics are the present days actors)
