= The Elementary School =

1991 Czechoslovak comedy-drama film

- Original release poster
- Directed by: Jan Svěrák
- Screenplay by: Zdeněk Svěrák
- Story by: Zdeněk Svěrák
- Produced by: Jaromír Lukáš
- Starring: Václav Jakoubek; Jan Tříska
- Cinematography: František A. Brabec
- Edited by: Alois Fisárek
- Music by: Jiří Svoboda
- Production company: Filmové Studio Barrandov
- Distributed by: Lucernafilm - Alfa
- Release date: 1 August 1991
- Running time: 100 minutes
- Country: Czechoslovakia
- Language: Czech
- Box office: 13 million KČs

The Elementary School (Czech: Obecná škola) is a 1991 Czechoslovak comedy-drama film directed by Jan Svěrák. The screenplay comes from the pen of his father Zdeněk Svěrák. The film was nominated for the Academy Award for Best Foreign Language Film in 1991 and is considered to belong among the best Czechoslovak films ever. A prequel, Barefoot, was released in 2017.

The film is set in the early post-war period, in a suburban elementary school in Prague's vicinity. A war hero is hired as a teacher, and asked to discipline an unruly class of boys. He soon earns their respect, but he is threatened with termination over his reputed sexual relationship with two highschool girls.

== Plot ==
Shortly after World War II, in 1945–46, in one of the suburbs of Prague (the film was shot in Michle), Eda Souček attends a boys' elementary school where he belongs to a class with a complete lack of discipline. After the class drives their teacher, Maxová, to a mental breakdown during one of her classes, the schoolmaster has to implement special measures. Authoritative Igor Hnízdo, who is said to be a great war hero, is hired as their new teacher. He immediately introduces corporal punishment, which, as he claims, is not normally allowed, but the school has received an exception from the Ministry of Education, especially for their class. Whenever he is not satisfied with the boys' behavior, Hnízdo asks them to flex their arms and hits their palms several times with a flexible switch.

Despite his strict methods, the boys soon become charmed by the man. They love his battlefront stories and the fact that he is always armed and wears a uniform. Eda sees him as the very opposite of his own father, whom he considers to be too cowardly. Hnízdo makes the same positive impression on the townspeople (including Eda's mother). Nevertheless, his persona is also surrounded by many controversies. He is a notorious womanizer and is said to have a special weakness for high school girls. His war heroism is also disputed as he is unable to provide any accurate information about his military service. There is even an unconfirmed rumor that Hnízdo's role during the war was to guard a herd of goats. But the boys from his class refuse to believe it and even fight those who are spreading these rumors.

Hnízdo's reputation suffers after he is accused of having a sexual relationship with 16-year-old twins who attend a girls' school in the same area. He is forced to leave because this is not the first time he has been involved in a similar scandal. The formerly unmanageable boys begin to defend Hnízdo and call for his return. The accusation is finally withdrawn, and Hnízdo is reinstalled as their teacher. He states that the way they dealt with the accusation is proof that their relationship is now based on mutual trust and physical punishments are no longer required, and he breaks his switch in half.

== Cast ==
- Václav Jakoubek as Eda Souček
- Jan Tříska as Igor Hnízdo
- Radoslav Budáč as Tonda
- Zdeněk Svěrák as František Souček
- Libuše Šafránková as Mrs. Součková
- Rudolf Hrušínský as Schoolmaster
- Rudolf Hrušínský Jr. as Tonda's father
- Eva Holubová as Tonda's mother
- Petr Čepek as Josef Mrázek (aka fakir Raji Tamil)
- Boleslav Polívka as Plíha
- Ondřej Vetchý as Tram driver
- Irena Pavlásková as Tram driver's wife
- Daniela Kolářová as Teacher Maxová

== Production ==
The original story was written by Zdeněk Svěrák. He used his own experiences both as a pupil of a similar school and as a former teacher. This is the first of the films created by the successful father screenwriter - son director duo. The others include Akumulátor I. (1993), Kolja (1996), Tmavomodrý svět (2000) and Vratné lahve (2007). It was also the first non-documentary film by Jan Svěrák. Obecná škola is also notable because it includes one of the last roles for two prominent Czech actors Rudolf Hrušínský (his last big screen film) and Petr Čepek (appeared in two more films before his death). The film was also the first appearance of Jan Tříska in a Czech film since his emigration to the United States in 1977.

== See also ==
- List of submissions to the 64th Academy Awards for Best Foreign Language Film
- List of Czechoslovak submissions for the Academy Award for Best Foreign Language Film
