= České nebe =

České nebe (English: Czech Heaven) is a stage play from the repertoire of Jára Cimrman Theatre, sub-titled Cimrman's Dramatic Testament. The authors are Zdeněk Svěrák and Ladislav Smoljak and like co-author is presented fictional Czech gadgeteer, philosopher and dramatic Jára Cimrman. The play premiered on 28 October 2008 in the Žižkov Theatre of Jára Cimrman. The play was nominated in the Alfréd Radok Awards in 2008.

== Lecture ==
- in brackets are captured the characters which are usually depicted by the actor presenting given part of the lecture

- Discovery of a new play (J. A. Komenský)
- Cimrman's living copier (Saint Václav)
- Marshal Radetzky and his life (Grandmother)
- Cimrman's statue in Prague (Jan Hus)
- Cimrman's juvenility (Karel Havlíček Borovský, Grandmother and Radetzky)
- Královedvorský and Zelenohorský Manuscripts (J. A. Komenský)

== Play ==
The original play followed which its described conference of Czech Heaven Commission in World War I. The principal is Saint Václav and another members are J. A. Komenský, Forefather Čech, Karel Havlíček Borovský, Jan Hus, Babička (The Grandmother) of Božena Němcová.

== Cast ==
- Jan Amos Komenský .... Ladislav Smoljak or Zdeněk Svěrák
- Jan Hus .... Bořivoj Penc or Jaroslav Weigel
- Saint Václav .... Petr Brukner or Petr Reidinger
- Forefather Czech .... Jan Hraběta or Jan Kašpar
- Karel Havlíček Borovský .... Genadij Rumlena or Robert Bárta
- Grandmother .... Miloň Čepelka or Marek Šimon
- Joseph Radetzky von Radetz .... Václav Kotek, Bořivoj Penc or Petr Reidinger
- Miroslav Tyrš .... Michal Weigel or Zdeněk Škrdlant
