= 7796 Járacimrman =

Asteroid

Discovery
- Discovered by: Z. Moravec
- Discovery site: Kleť Obs.
- Discovery date: 16 January 1996

Designations
- Pronunciation: Czech pronunciation: [ˈjaːratsɪmr̩man]
- Named after: Jára Cimrman (Fictional Czech inventor, composer, writer, poet, and the teacher of the nation.)
- Alternative designations: 1996 BG · 1973 YE_{3} 1990 VG
- Minor planet category: main-belt · (middle); Adeona

Orbital characteristics
- Epoch 4 September 2017 (JD 2458000.5)
- Uncertainty parameter 0
- Observation arc: 43.02 yr (15,712 days)
- Aphelion: 3.0429 AU
- Perihelion: 2.2879 AU
- Semi-major axis: 2.6654 AU
- Eccentricity: 0.1416
- Orbital period (sidereal): 4.35 yr (1,589 days)
- Mean anomaly: 340.60°
- Mean motion: 0° 13^{m} 35.4^{s} / day
- Inclination: 12.811°
- Longitude of ascending node: 93.831°
- Argument of perihelion: 41.775°

Physical characteristics
- Dimensions: 11.312±0.313 km
- Geometric albedo: 0.055±0.011
- Absolute magnitude (H): 13.4

7796 Járacimrman (Czech pronunciation: [ˈjaːratsɪmr̩man]) is a dark Adeonian asteroid orbiting in the central region of the asteroid belt, approximately 11 kilometers in diameter. Discovered by Zdeněk Moravec at the Kleť Observatory in 1996, it was later named after Jára Cimrman, a Czech fictional character.

== Discovery ==
Járacimrman was discovered by Zdeněk Moravec at the Kleť Observatory in the Czech Republic, on 16 January 1996 and was initially designated 1996 BG. Observations continued until April 1996, and then again between June and July 1997. The asteroid was later determined to be a lost asteroid which had previously been observed twice: at the Brera-Merate Observatory in northern Italy on 12 December 1973, and at Mount Stromlo Observatory, near Canberra, Australia, on 8 and 9 July 1990.

== Classification and orbit ==
The asteroid is a member of the Adeona family (505), a large family of carbonaceous asteroids.

In 1997, Járacimrman's orbit was calculated more precisely by additional observatories and it could therefore be numbered as asteroid 7796, the 312th recognized (numbered) asteroid discovered at the Kleť Observatory. Moravec suggested naming it after the fictional Czech polymath Jára Cimrman.

== Physical characteristics ==
According to the survey carried out by NASA's Wide-field Infrared Survey Explorer with its subsequent NEOWISE mission, Járacimrman measures 11.312 kilometers in diameter and its surface has an albedo of 0.055, which is typical for carbonaceous C-type asteroids. However, no spectral data is available for the asteroid, thus neither its chemical nor mineralogical composition is currently known. In addition, no rotational lightcurve has been obtained of Járacimrman as of 2017.

== Naming ==
The citation accompanying the suggestion said: "Named for Jára Cimrman, a fictitious Czech genius. An analogue to Leonardo da Vinci, he was a playwright, composer, poet, painter, versatile scientist, inventor, polar explorer, sportsman, first man on the moon, etc. Although his name is not mentioned in any encyclopedia, his work is explored at the Jára Cimrman Theatre in Prague. This theatre is headed by the famous cimrmanologists Z. Svěrák and L. Smoljak, who endorsed the name proposal." The name was approved by International Astronomical Union (IAU) Committee on Small Body Nomenclature and published on 11 February 1998 (M.P.C. 31298).
