= Vražda v salonním coupé =

1970 play

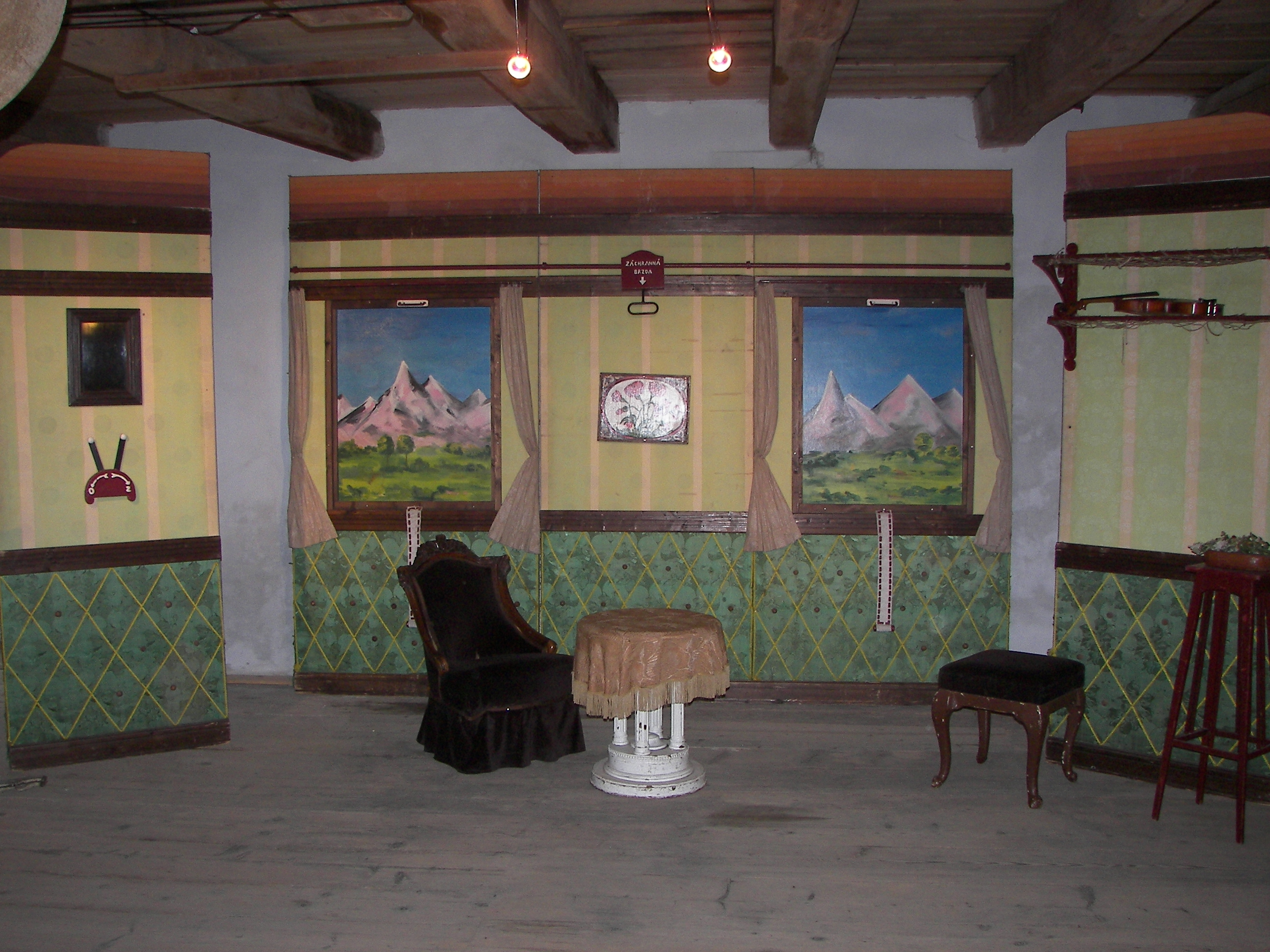
Original scene from play

Vražda v salonním coupé (English: Murder in a Parlor Car Compartment) is a stage comedy play in the repertory of the Jára Cimrman Theatre. It was written by Zdeněk Svěrák and Ladislav Smoljak, and co-authorship is credited to the fictional Czech inventor, philosopher and dramatist Jára Cimrman. The play premiered on 14 May 1970 in Malostranská beseda, Prague. As of October 2007, the play had been performed 848 times.

== Cast ==
=== Play ===
- Zdeněk Svěrák or Ladislav Smoljak as Inspector Trachta
- Miloň Čepelka or Petr Brukner as Jindřich Hlaváček, trainee policeman
- Jaroslav Weigel, Jan Kašpar, Bořivoj Penc, Oldřich Unger or Jaroslav Vozáb as Manufacturer Bierhanzel
- Jan Hraběta, Pavel Vondruška, Jan Klusák or Jiří Menzel as Manufacturer Meyer
- Václav Kotek, Genadij Rumlena, Josef Koudelka, František Petiška, Jaroslav Vozáb or Jan Kašpar as Train steward

=== Film ===
- Jiří Zahajský as Inspector Trachta
- Marek Brodský as Jindřich Hlaváček
- Rudolf Hrušínský as Mr. Hlaváček
- Blažena Holišová as Mrs. Hlaváčková
- Josef Abrhám as Professor Žalud
- Veronika Jeníková as Růženka
- Jaroslava Adamová as Keeper's brothel
- Petr Čepek as Police president
- Vlastimil Brodský as Oulík
- Rudolf Hrušínský ml. as Sýkorka
- Jiří Kodet as Bierhanzel
- Jaroslava Krettschmerová as Mrs. Pecháčková
- Jaroslav Weigel as Mr. Pecháček
- Zdeněk Srstka as Mr. Bedříšek
- Zdeněk Svěrák as Mr. Jelínek

== See also ==
- Jára Cimrman
