= Externism =

Philosophical theory proposed in plays of the Jára Cimrman Theatre in Prague

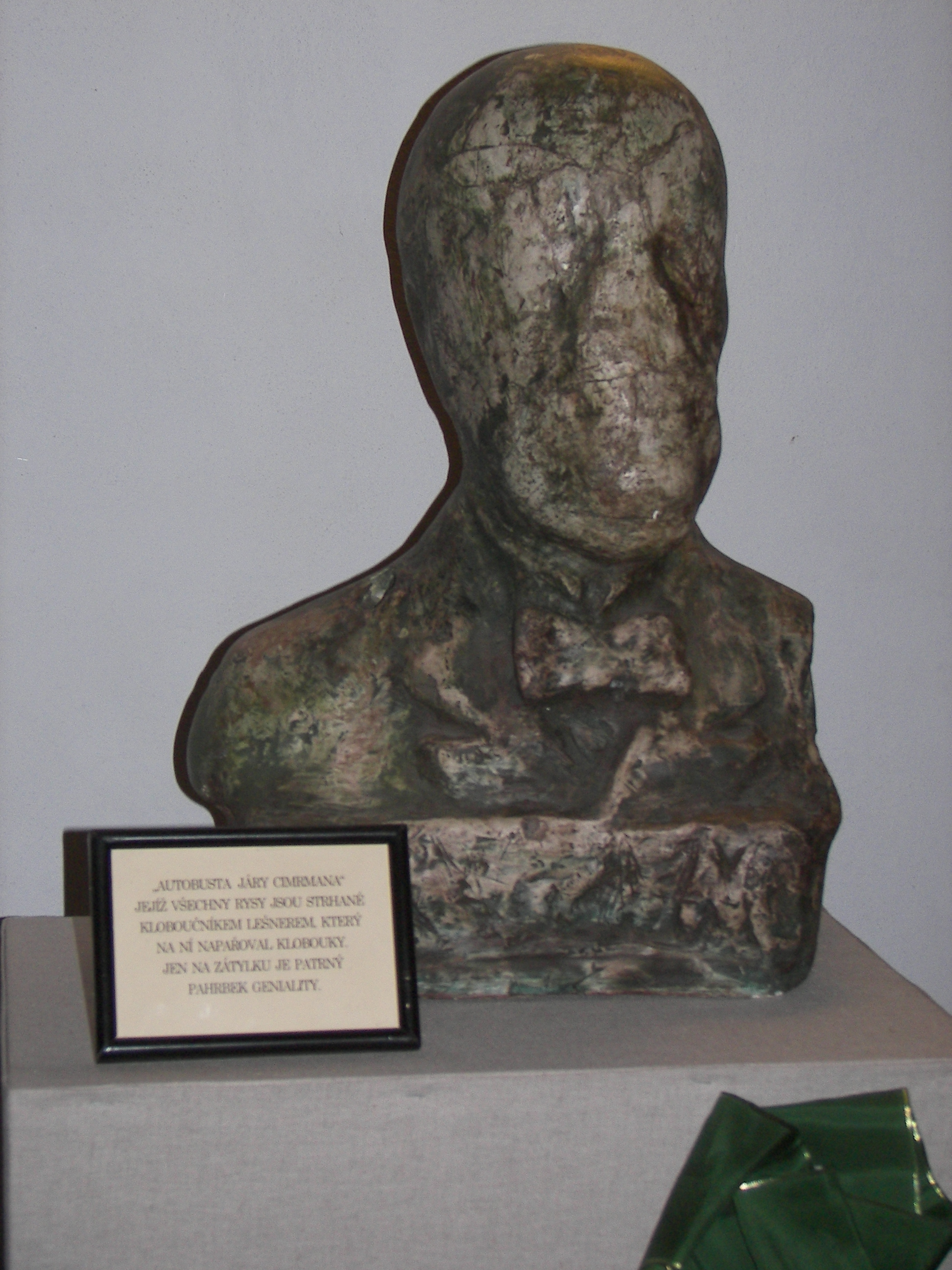
Jára Cimrman's self-bust

Externism is a fictional philosophical theory proposed by the fictional Czech polymath Jára Cimrman. This character appears in many plays by authors from the Jára Cimrman Theatre in Prague. The first act of the theatre performance is usually filled with a lecture on Cimrman's personality, followed by a theatrical play. The theory of externism is described in a monologue by a Cimrmanologist having a lecture on Jára Cimrman's significance in the field of philosophy in the first act of the theatre play Akt (The Nude) by Zdeněk Svěrák, Ladislav Smoljak and Jiří Šebánek.

This epistemological theory contradicts the traditional theory of solipsism. While solipsists believe that only their individual self exists and the external world does not, Jára Cimrman confronted them with the idea that it is the external world that exists and the philosopher's individual self does not.

At first, this idea was met with huge disagreement among philosophers. Jára Cimrman was invited to defend his theory at the philosophical congress in Basel. The key counterargument that he had to face was: How could a non-existing consciousness create a theory?

Jára Cimrman replied that the fact that he does not exist does not mean he is not perceptible. He compared the world to a space with a small place in the middle, where Jára Cimrman is missing. If we take a piece of paper with a hole in the middle, the paper can be compared to the external world and the hole (which is clearly visible) to the non-existing philosopher. Stretching and contracting the space results in the opposite change in the form of the hole. This movement can be viewed as a process of a philosopher's thinking.

Later Cimrman elaborated the theory in more detail, as Cimrmanologists found out when reading Albert Einstein's correspondence. He proposed that even other objects in our world do not exist in the way it is usually thought of. In fact, an object is located in a place where we think it is not, and it is not in the place where we consider it to be. For example, if you take a piece of chalk, the chalk forms a huge mass all around itself, where the chalk may be, with a small bubble inside, where the chalk is definitely not.

Albert Einstein considered the theory to be "funny", which Cimrmanologists read as an expression of admiration. However, he had some objections as well. He wrote, "As a physicist, I have to point out that it makes no difference if you call an object 'emptiness' and the emptiness 'object'. It is just ping-pong with words."

Cimrman's rival in the field of philosophy was F. C. Bohlen (another fictitious philosopher). He owned a pharmacy and was known for using exceptionally rude language. According to this vulgar materialist (which also means "pharmacist" in Czech), the truth is the basic principle of our knowledge. At the beginning of the learning process, the truth is inaccurate and we make it more precise. Finally, we know everything.

Cimrman stated that at the beginning of every learning process, our knowledge is formed by a mistake, which is precise, and we must refute it. Finally, we know nothing. Despite this, Cimrman cannot be considered to be agnostic or nihilist. On the contrary, he sees the learning process positively as a process of disproving the initial mistake. Thus, we can finally stand face-to-face with the Universe, having our head clear and empty.

The fact that in the end, we know nothing is just a logical consequence of Cimrman's externism. The example with the chalk showed that in the learning process, when we try to get nearer to an object, we always reach a place where the object is not. Therefore, in the end of the process, we know nothing but we know it exactly.

The theory can be easily applied to the whole of existence, except for the theory itself. When doing so, we seemingly disprove it: either it is a mistake, or we do not know it. Therefore, Cimrman created a revolutionary solution: Cimrman's "Step-Aside". Thus he, just for a little while, appeared in the world of vulgar materialism, and could confirm his theory as valid. The conclusions of both theories he joined together with a colon: "We know everything: We know nothing."
