= An Uncertain Season =

- Directed by: Ladislav Smoljak
- Written by: Zdeněk Svěrák; Ladislav Smoljak
- Starring: Zdeněk Svěrák; Ladislav Smoljak; Petr Brukner; Jaroslav Vozáb; Jaroslav Weigel
- Music by: Petr Skoumal
- Release date: 1 April 1988
- Country: Czechoslovakia
- Language: Czech

An Uncertain Season (Czech: Nejistá sezóna) is a Czechoslovak comedy film directed by Ladislav Smoljak and Zdeněk Svěrák from 1987, which depicts the struggles of a small amateur theatre company as it prepares a new play and tries to get it officially approved. The plot is based on the authentic experiences of the Jára Cimrman Theatre, features its actors and contains real excerpts from his plays, but Cimrman's name does not appear once (at most he is referred to as "The Master").

The entire film takes place in the Solidarita Theatre, the actual location of the Jára Cimrman Theatre at the time. Virtually the entire film was shot without post-synchronous sound. This gives it a documentary character.
