= Dark Blue World =

2001 film by Jan Svěrák

- Czech theatrical release poster
- Directed by: Jan Svěrák
- Written by: Zdeněk Svěrák
- Produced by: Eric Abraham
- Starring: Ondřej Vetchý; Kryštof Hádek; Tara Fitzgerald; Oldřich Kaiser; Charles Dance
- Cinematography: Vladimír Smutný
- Edited by: Alois Fišárek
- Music by: Ondřej Soukup
- Distributed by: Cinemart (Czech Republic); Sony Pictures Classics (United Kingdom); Buena Vista International; Helkon Filmverleih (Germany); Medusa Distribuzione (Italy)
- Release dates: 17 May 2001 (Czech Republic); 13 November 2001 (United Kingdom)
- Running time: 115 minutes
- Countries: Czech Republic; United Kingdom; Germany; Italy
- Languages: Czech; English; German; Slovak; Spanish (Spain)
- Budget: € 8 million
- Box office: $2,300,000 (Worldwide)

Dark Blue World (Czech: Tmavomodrý svět) is a 2001 war drama film by Czech director Jan Svěrák, the Academy Award-winning director of Kolya. The film is about Czech pilots who fought for the British Royal Air Force (RAF) during the Second World War. The screenplay was written by Zdeněk Svěrák, the director's father. The film stars Czech actors Ondřej Vetchý, Kryštof Hádek and Oldřich Kaiser. British actors include Tara Fitzgerald, Charles Dance and Anna Massey.

== Plot ==
In 1950, during the Cold War, František (Franta) Sláma (Ondřej Vetchý) is incarcerated in Czechoslovakia, because of his prior service in the RAF. His recollections of the war begin in 1939, just days prior to the German invasion of Czechoslovakia. After the invasion, the Czechoslovak Army is disbanded and its Air Force has to surrender its aircraft. However, Franta and his young friend Karel Vojtíšek (Kryštof Hádek), among others, refuse to submit to their occupiers and flee to the United Kingdom to join the RAF.

The British make the Czechoslovaks retrain from the basics, which infuriates them, especially Karel, who is both impatient to fight the Germans and humiliated at being retaught what he already knows. Karel also sees the compulsory English language lessons as a pointless waste of his time. The RAF is in such a dire need of pilots during the Battle of Britain that eventually the Czechoslovak airmen are allowed to fly. After their first sortie they realise why the British have trained them so intensely: a young Czechoslovak nicknamed "Tom Tom" is shot down by a Messerschmitt Bf 109 and killed. Franta becomes the unit commander, with the younger Karel under his charge.

While shooting down a Heinkel He 111 bomber, Karel's Spitfire fighter aircraft is shot down. However, he manages to survive and find his way to a farm. There he meets and falls in love with Susan (Tara Fitzgerald), although she thinks he is far too young. The next day, after returning to the aerodrome, Karel brings Franta to meet Susan. The latter begins to get attracted to Susan, although Karel believes that Susan is interested in him.

Following a mission to France where the squadron attacks a train, Karel is shot down, but Franta lands and rescues him, a move that shows that their friendship endures. Soon after, however, Karel learns a sort of love triangle has developed, with Susan being involved with Franta, which leads to a quarrel between the two friends. Later in the war, while escorting American bombers, Franta's Spitfire malfunctions and he is forced to ditch into the ocean. His life raft bursts as he tries to inflate it, so Karel tries to drop his own raft, but he flies too low and fatally crashes. The raft emerges from the water, allowing Franta to survive.

Afterward, when the war is over, Franta drives to Susan's home, only to find her with her injured husband recently returned from fighting overseas. Knowing he has no future with Susan and wanting to preserve her honour, he pretends to have lost his way and asks directions to the next town. Franta returns to Czechoslovakia and finds his old girlfriend has married the neighbourhood jobsworth, has given birth to a child, and has taken over Barča, his dog. All the disappointed Franta can do is endure the situation as stoically as he can. In prison, he only has his memories of his friendship with Karel to sustain him.

== Cast ==
Actor	Role
Ondřej Vetchý	František Sláma
Kryštof Hádek	Karel Vojtíšek
Tara Fitzgerald	Susan
Charles Dance	Wing Commander Bentley
Oldřich Kaiser	Jan Machatý
David Novotný	Bedřich Mrtvý
Linda Rybová	Hanička
Jaromír Dulava	Kaňka
Lukáš Kantor	"Tom Tom"
Radim Fiala (actor)	Sysel
Juraj Bernáth	Gregora
Miroslav Táborský	Houf
Hans-Jörg Assmann	Dr Blaschke
Thure Riefenstein	Oberleutnant Hesse
Anna Massey	English Teacher
Čestmír Řanda Jr	Pavlata

== Production ==
A combination of computer imagery and full-scale aircraft was used for the aerial sequences.

Principal photography for the film involved a large number of locations: Hradčany Airport, Czech Republic, Dover, England, Germany and South Africa.

Dogfight footage from the 1969 film Battle of Britain was seamlessly integrated with contemporary film footage using computer imagery and mastering to create the aerial sequences due to the prohibitively expensive cost ($10,000 per hour) of renting a real Spitfire. The scene of a train being attacked was the most expensive scene in Czech cinema history, costing more than the entire film Kolya. Brief scenes from the 1990 film Memphis Belle were also incorporated. Director Jan Svěrák played a number of roles, including practically all the crew members of an Allied North American B-25 Mitchell bomber in the scene where a damaged bomber is escorted.

== Reception ==
Dark Blue World opened in both the U.S. and Europe at major international film festivals in London and Toronto, to generally positive reviews, making it one of the most popular aviation war films made. Rex Reed described the film in The New York Observer as an "epic that blends action, romance and tragedy. Brilliantly directed and sublimely acted." Animator Hayao Miyazaki was very positive of the film, praising it for showing the speed and fragility of aircraft and the historic tragedy of the Czech pilots after the war.

However, other reviewers were not as enthused. Leonard Maltin commented that the love triangle provided a "more novel and interesting" aspect but the "surprisingly elaborate" flying scenes helped make the film less of a "capable but uninspired yarn", not very different from other World War II features. Peter Bradshaw's review in The Guardian echoed a similar view, "A by-the-numbers WW2 romantic tale of two Czech pilots in love with the same British woman, which plays like a mixture of Pearl Harbor and "Two Little Boys" by Rolf Harris."

=== Box office ===
Dark Blue World was the most popular Czech film of the year with admissions of 1 million. It was released in the United States on 28 December 2001, and grossed $258,771. The film grossed $2,300,000 worldwide.

=== Awards and honours ===
Dark Blue World was a major winner at the 2002 Czech Lion Awards with Box Office Award, Critics' Award Jan Svěrák for Best Director, Vladimír Smutný for Best Cinematography, Ondřej Soukup for Best Music and Alois Fišárek for Best Editing. The film was also nominated for Best Film, Ondřej Vetchý for Best Actor, Kryštof Hádek for Best Supporting Actor, Linda Rybová for Best Supporting Actress, Zbyněk Mikulík for Best Sound, Věra Mirová for Best Costumes and Jan Vlasák for Best Art Direction.

Dark Blue World also won the 2001 National Board Review award for Best Foreign Film and the 2002 Love is Folly International Film Festival (Bulgaria), Golden Aphrodite Award (Best Film) for Jan Svěrák. Ondřej Vetchý was also nominated for the Audience Award (Best Actor) in the 2001 European Film Awards.

== See also ==
- František Fajtl
- Nebeští jezdci aka Sky Riders
