= Největší Čech =

Czech spin-off of the BBC Greatest Britons show

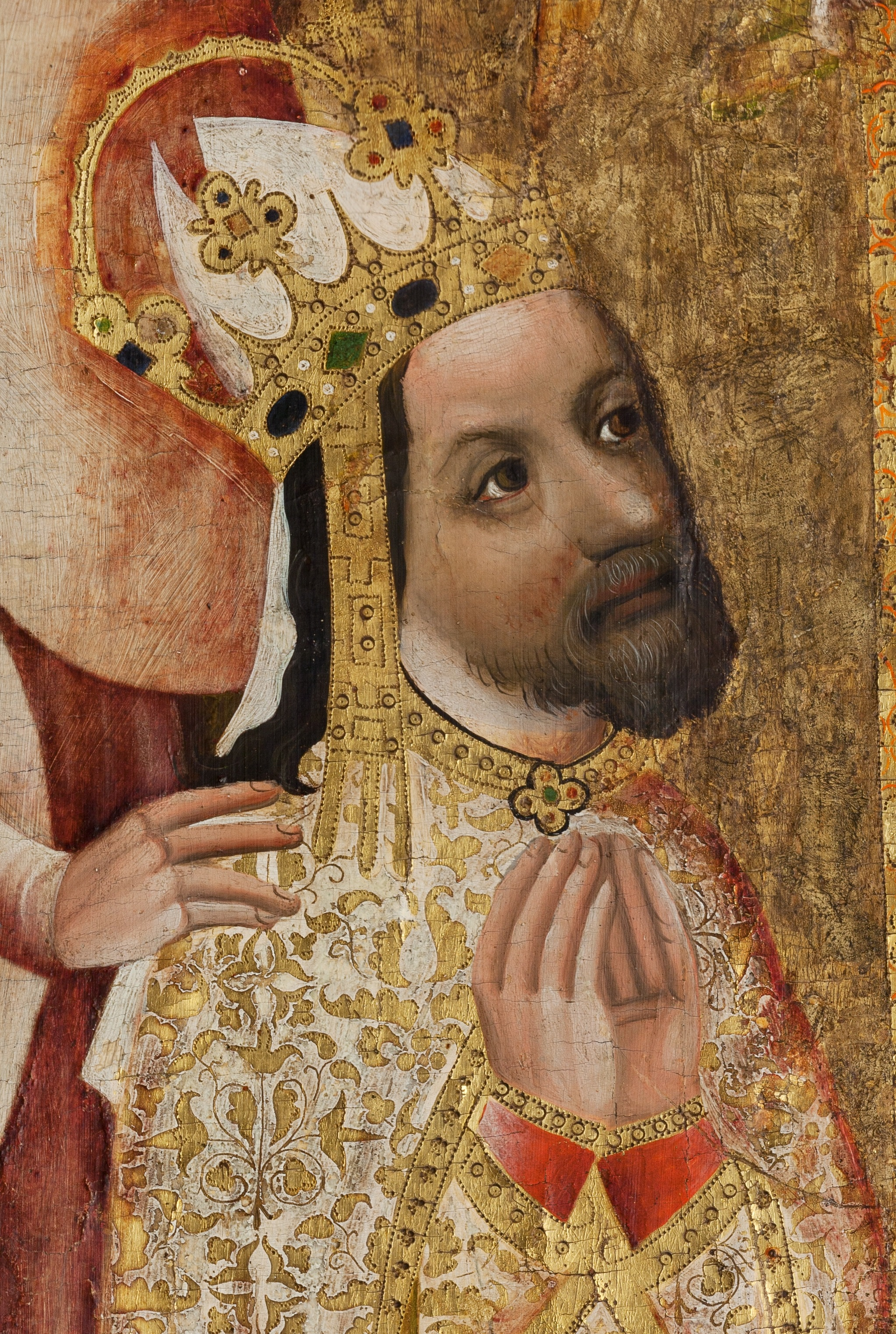
King Charles IV, the winner of the poll

Největší Čech (The Greatest Czech) is the Czech spin-off of the BBC Greatest Britons show; a television poll of the populace to name the greatest Czech in history. The series was broadcast by the national public-service broadcaster, Czech Television. The presenter of the programme was Marek Eben, who was also nominated to be in the Top 100; however, since he was presenting the show he was not eligible to be included in the final list.

The counting and ranking of the nomination votes took place during January 2005; the top 100 were announced on 5 May; and the final rankings were announced on 10 June 2005. The first round was won by the fictional genius Jára Cimrman, but he was disqualified.

== List of Greatest Czechs ==
1. King Charles IV, Bohemian king (1346–1378) and Emperor (1355–1378), founder of Charles Bridge and Charles University – 68,713 votes
2. Tomáš Garrigue Masaryk (1850–1937) – first Czechoslovak president (1918–1935) – 55,040 votes
3. Václav Havel (1936–2011) – last Czechoslovak (1989–1992) and first Czech president (1993–2003), dissident and anti-communist activist
4. John Amos Comenius (1592–1670) – philosopher and pedagogue, "Teacher of Nations"
5. Jan Žižka (1360–1424) – Hussite general, leader of Czech resistance to the Holy Roman Empire and Catholic Church
6. Jan Werich (1905–1980) – actor, playwright and author
7. Jan Hus (1369–1415) – religious reformer
8. Antonín Dvořák (1841–1904) – composer
9. Karel Čapek (1890–1938) – writer, author of R.U.R.
10. Božena Němcová – writer, author of The Grandmother
11. Bedřich Smetana (1824–1884) – composer
12. Emil Zátopek (1922–2000) – athlete, Olympic winner
13. Karel Gott (1939–2019) – pop singer
14. George of Poděbrady (1430–1471) – utraquist king
15. František Palacký (1798–1876) – historian and politician
16. Ottokar II of Bohemia (1233–1278) – king, known as "Iron and Gold King"
17. Saint Wenceslaus (907–935) – duke (922–935) and patron saint of Bohemia
18. Václav Klaus (1941–) – second president of the Czech Republic (2003–2013)
19. Jaroslav Heyrovský (1890–1967) – chemist, Nobel prize laureate
20. Saint Agnes of Bohemia (1211–1282) – princess and saint, founder of first Prague hospital
21. Tomáš Baťa (1876–1932) – first republic businessman
22. Edvard Beneš (1884–1948) – second Czechoslovak president (1935–1938, in exile 1940–1945, 1945–1948)
23. Otto Wichterle (1913–1998) – chemist, inventor of contact lenses
24. Jaroslav Seifert (1901–1986) – poet, Nobel Prize laureate
25. Zdeněk Svěrák (1936–) – playwright, screenwriter, actor and "cimrmanologist"
26. Emmy Destinn (1878–1930) – opera singer
27. Jaromír Jágr (1972–) – ice hockey player
28. Maria Theresa (1717–1780) – Bohemian queen
29. Karel Kryl (1944–1994) – dissident singer-songwriter
30. Miloš Forman (1932–2018) – film director
31. Vlasta Burian (1891–1962) – actor, "king of comedians"
32. Roman Šebrle (1974–) – decathlete, Olympic winner
33. Ivan Hlinka (1950–2004) – ice hockey player and coach
34. Karel Havlíček Borovský (1821–1856) – journalist and writer
35. Daniel Landa (1968–) – singer
36. Milada Horáková (1901–1950) – victim of Nazism and later communism (hanged in 1950)
37. Vladimír Menšík (1929–1988) – actor
38. Jaroslav Hašek (1883–1923) – writer, author of The Good Soldier Švejk
39. Alfons Mucha (1860–1939) – art nouveau painter
40. Jan Evangelista Purkyně (1787–1869) – biologist and physician
41. Pavel Nedvěd (1972–) – footballer (European footballer of the year 2003)
42. Jan Janský (1873–1921) – neurologist and psychiatrist, discoverer of four blood types
43. František Křižík (1847–1941) – inventor, engineer and industrialist
44. Jan Železný (1966–) – Olympic athlete
45. Jan Palach (1948–1969) – protester against Soviet invasion of 1968 (self-immolated)
46. Věra Čáslavská (1942–2016) – Olympic athlete
47. Leoš Janáček (1854–1928) – composer
48. Alois Jirásek (1851–1930) – playwright and author
49. Jaromír Nohavica (1953–) – musician
50. Jan Masaryk (1886–1948) – Czechoslovak secretary of foreign affairs (1940–48)
51. Bohumil Hrabal (1914–1997) – writer
52. Jan Neruda (1834–1891) – writer
53. Josef Jungmann (1773–1847) – linguist and translator
54. Gregor Mendel (1822–1884) – geneticist, "father of genetics"
55. Franz Kafka (1883–1924) – writer
56. František Tomášek (1899–1992) – archbishop of Prague
57. Saint Adalbert (956–997) – saint
58. Josef Bican (1913–2001) – football player
59. Josef Kajetán Tyl (1808–1856) – playwright
60. Lucie Bílá (1966–) – pop singer
61. Karel Hynek Mácha (1810–1836) – poet
62. Saint Ludmila (860–921) – grandmother of the Czech patron St. Wenceslaus
63. Boleslav Polívka (1949–) – actor
64. Rudolf II, Holy Roman Emperor (1552–1612) – king
65. Josef Dobrovský (1753–1829) – philologist
66. Josef Lada (1887–1957) – painter
67. Rudolf Hrušínský (1920–1994) – actor
68. Wenceslaus II of Bohemia (1271–1305) – king
69. Madeleine Albright (1937–2022) – politician, US secretary of state
70. Aneta Langerová (1986–) – pop singer, Česko hledá SuperStar winner
71. Ottokar I of Bohemia (1155–1230) – king, conqueror
72. Ludvík Svoboda (1895–1975) – Commander of the 1st Czechoslovak Army Corps in the Soviet Union during World War II and communist president (1968-1975)
73. Dominik Hašek (1965–) – ice hockey player
74. John of Bohemia (1296–1346) – king, father of Charles IV
75. Milan Baroš (1981–) – footballer
76. Karel Jaromír Erben (1811–1870) – poet
77. Saint Zdislava (1200–1252) – saint
78. Jaroslav Foglar (1907–1999) – writer
79. Ladislav Smoljak (1931–2010) – actor and writer, actor and "cimrmanologist"
80. Olga Havlová (1933–1996) – wife of Václav Havel, former Czechoslovak and Czech president
81. Martina Navratilova (1956–) – tennis player
82. Helena Růžičková (1936–2004) – actress
83. Pavel Tigrid (1917–2003) – writer
84. Elisabeth of Bohemia (1292–1330) – queen
85. Milan Kundera (1929–2023) – writer
86. Vladimír Remek (1948–) – cosmonaut and politician
87. Boleslaus I, Duke of Bohemia (915-972?) – king
88. Magdalena Dobromila Rettigová (1785–1845) – writer
89. Mikoláš Aleš (1852–1913) – painter
90. Emil Holub (1847–1907) – physician, traveler and writer
91. František Fajtl (1912–2006) – fighter pilot in World War II
92. Klement Gottwald (1896–1953) – first Communist president of Czechoslovakia
93. Zdeněk Matějček (1922–2004)– pediatrician
94. Jiří Voskovec (1905–1981)– actor
95. Marta Kubišová (1942–) – singer and actress
96. Jiřina Bohdalová (1931–) – actress
97. Miloslav Šimek (1940–2004) – actor
98. Sigmund Freud (1856–1939) – psychiatrist, teacher of Carl Gustav Jung
99. Samo (600–658) – ruler of the so-called Samo's Realm
100. Miloš Zeman (1944–) – third Czech president (2013—2023)

== The Greatest Villain ==
At the same time as the nominations, an Internet vote for the greatest villain of Czech history was held. The top ten were:

1. Klement Gottwald (1896–1953) – first Communist president of Czechoslovakia (1948–53)
2. Stanislav Gross (1969–2015) – 20th/21st-century politician, Czech Republic PM
3. Václav Klaus (1941–) – 20th/21st-century politician, president of Czech Republic
4. Vladimír Železný (1945–) – 20th/21st-century television businessman, founder of TV Nova, charged with an extensive tunnelling fraud
5. Miroslav Kalousek (1960–) – 20th/21st-century politician, leader of Christian Democratic party
6. Miroslav Grebeníček (1947–) – leader of Communist Party of Moravia and Bohemia
7. Viktor Kožený (1963–) – 20th/21st-century financial figure, fugitive financier, nicknamed "the pirate of Prague"
8. Milouš Jakeš (1922–2020) – 20th-century politician, General Secretary of Czechoslovak Communist Party before and during Velvet Revolution
9. Zdeněk Škromach (1956–) – former minister of work and social affairs
10. Gustáv Husák (1913–1991) – 20th-century politician, last Communist president of Czechoslovakia

== Jára Cimrman ==
The first round of official voting for Greatest Czech was won by the fictional character Jára Cimrman created by Czech humorists Jiří Šebánek, Zdeněk Svěrák (who himself took the 25th place) and Ladislav Smoljak (79th). The fact that he is not a real person disqualified him from taking the title, as the rules stated that "it is only possible to vote for someone who was either born on, lived on, or in any way acted on the soil of Bohemia, Moravia or Czech Silesia."
