= Edita Brychta =

British actress

- Born: Edita Brychtová; 6 September 1961 (age 65); Prague, Czechoslovakia
- Occupation: Actress
- Years active: 1983–present

Edita Brychta (née Brychtová; born 6 September 1961) is a British actress of Czech descent. She has acted in various capacities including on stage, film, television, as well as voice acting in animated films, video games and audiobooks. Born in Czechoslovakia (modern day Czech Republic), Brychta studied in the United Kingdom and subsequently moved to live in the United States.

== Early life ==
Brychta is the daughter of Czech artist Jan Brychta (1928–2013). Brychta began acting as a young child in the Czech film Kinoautomat, the world's first interactive movie, which was presented at Expo 67 in Montreal. After the Warsaw Pact invasion of Czechoslovakia in August 1968, Brychta immigrated to the United Kingdom with her parents and brother. At the age of 16, she joined London's National Theatre Youth Workshop and decided to pursue an acting career.

== Career ==
She trained at LAMDA and was signed by Ken McReddie. In the UK, Brychta went on to play Juliet in Romeo & Juliet, Ophelia in Hamlet, Desdemona in Othello, and Marguerite in the world premiere of Vaclav Havel's Largo Desolato, directed by Tom Stoppard. She played Sybil Burlington in the award-winning West End production of Daisy Pulls It Off, produced by Andrew Lloyd Webber.

Brychta appeared in TV series such as Maelstrom, Gentleman and Players, Lovejoy, Just Good Friends and Taggart, as well as the award-winning The Escape (Border in the UK) and the BAFTA-nominated The Britoil Affair. She also, from 1997 to 1998, was the face of the Sainsbury's Reward Card, succeeding the role from Caron Keating.

Brychta was cast in the role of Princess Diana in NBC's Behind The Palace Doors and moved to Los Angeles. She went on to be cast in roles alongside Julia Roberts in Conspiracy Theory, Jim Carrey in Man On The Moon, James Garner in The Rockford Files and Angela Lansbury in Murder She Wrote. She also acted alongside Stellan Skarsgård and Lena Olin in the Swedish film Friends.

She worked with directors Ronald Neame, Milos Forman, Richard Donner, and in Mark Rydell's Crime Of The Century for HBO with Isabella Rossellini and Stephen Rea.

In the Czech Republic, Brychta played in her native language in two films, including the lead role of Anna in Jan Sverak's Akumulator 1. She also starred in the French TV series Cinq Filles à Paris.

Brychta has done voice-over for animated films such as Ice Age: Continental Drift, Cosmos, and The Bunbury Tails, and features including The Bourne Identity, Pirates Of The Caribbean and Man of Steel, as the voice of the mother ship.

Brychta has voiced various video game characters including Natasha in Red Alert 3. She has featured in radio plays for the BBC, including the critically acclaimed Me, Cheeta: My Life in Hollywood with John Malkovich.

Brychta has voiced audio books including Jane Goodall's Seeds of Hope and was nominated for an Audie for the trilogy, This Man. She performed a live narration for Leonard Bernstein's The Kaddish at Royce Hall in Los Angeles.

She featured in Daniel Deronda, A Room With a View, Watch on the Rhine, and the Tony-award-winning Oslo for LA Theater Works.

== Personal life ==
Brychta is married to producer David Ladd and has one daughter, Lauren Cassidy, by a previous marriage.

She has completed four open water swims from Alcatraz Island to San Francisco, the length of the Golden Gate Bridge three times, and the 10K distance from the Golden Gate Bridge to the Bay Bridge twice, winning numerous medals.

== Filmography ==
- Kingdoms of Amalur: Reckoning (2012) — (voice)
- Star Wars: The Old Republic (2011) — (voice)
- Criminal Minds (2010) Season 6, Episode 11: 25 to Life — Mrs. Stanworth
- Undercovers (2010) Season 1, Episode 6: Xerex — Londoner Wife
- Doktor od jezera hrochu (2010) — MUDr. Homolová
- Ratchet & Clank Future: A Crack in Time (2009) — (voice)
- Destroy All Humans! 2: Make War Not Love (2006) — (voice)
- A Good Year (2006) — (voice)
- SOCOM 3 U.S. Navy SEALs (2005) (voice) — COLDKILL
- Vampire: The Masquerade – Bloodlines (2004) (voice) — additional voices
- Kingdom Under Fire: The Crusaders (2004) (voice)
- James Bond 007: Everything or Nothing (2003) (voice)
- Robin Hood: Defender of the Crown (2003) (voice) — Maid Marian
- Kingdom Under Fire: A War of Heroes (2001) (voice)
- Spyro: Year of the Dragon (2000) (voice) — Sheila the Kangaroo, Princess Ami of the Fairies
- Man on the Moon (1999) — Pig-Tailed Wrestler
- Return to Krondor (1998) (voice)
- One Night Stand (1997) — Karen's Business Associate
- Conspiracy Theory (1997) — Henry Finch's Receptionist
- Crime of the Century (1996) — Gerta Henkel
- The Rockford Files: Godfather Knows Best (1996) — Katinka
- Murder, She Wrote: Nan's Ghost (1995) — Deirdre O'Bannon
- Accumulator 1 (1994) — Anna
- The Britoil Affair (1993) — Patricia Peters
- Behind the Palace Doors (1993) — Diana, Princess of Wales
- Fergie & Andrew: Behind the Palace Doors (1992) — Diana, Princess of Wales
- Lovejoy: (1991) National Wealth Season 2 — Melanie Ford
- The Piglet Files (1991) Helen
- Taggart: Rogues' Gallery (1990) — Valerie Sinclair
- The Secret Life of Ian Fleming (1990) — Maya
- Gentlemen and Players — Jane Somerville (13 episodes, 1988–1989)
- Friends (1988) — Sally
- Flying in the Branches (1988) — Dana
- Blind Justice (1988) — Suzie de Villiers
- Escape (1987) — Eva
- Galloping Galaxies!: Episode #2.4 (1986) — Amazonia
- Worlds Beyond: Guardian of the Past (1986) — Birgitta
- Call Me Mister: Humpty Dumpty (1986) — Elizabeth Monk
- Foreign Body (1986) — Jean
- Hot Metal: The Tell-Tale Head (1986)— Lady Deborah
- Cinq filles à Paris (1986) (mini) TV Series
- Maelstrom (1985) — Ingrid Nilsen
- Pericles, Prince of Tyre (1984) — Antiochus's Daughter
- Just Good Friends: Fatherly Advice (Season1 Episode4) (1983) — Girl in Pub

== See also ==
- Maelstrom (TV series)
- Gentlemen and Players (TV series)
- Accumulator 1
- Lovejoy (TV Series) – Melanie Ford
