= Ball Lightning (film) =

1979 Czech comedy film

- Directed by: Ladislav Smoljak; Zdeněk Podskalský
- Screenplay by: Zdeněk Svěrák; Ladislav Smoljak; Zdeněk Podskalský
- Produced by: Barrandov Studios
- Starring: Rudolf Hrušínský; Zdeněk Svěrák; Ladislav Smoljak; Josef Abrhám
- Cinematography: Ivan Šlapeta
- Edited by: Jiří Brožek
- Music by: Zdeněk Lukáš
- Production company: Barrandov Studios
- Distributed by: Ústřední půjčovna filmů
- Release date: 1 August 1979
- Running time: 82 minutes
- Country: Czechoslovakia
- Language: Czech

Ball Lightning (Czech: Kulový blesk) is a 1979 Czechoslovak comedy film. The screenplay was written by Zdeněk Svěrák, Ladislav Smoljak and Zdeněk Podskalský and the film was directed by Smoljak and Podskalský. Rudolf Hrušínský plays the starring role and is joined in the cast by others including Josef Abrhám, Daniela Kolářová, and Zita Kabátová.

== Plot ==
On the request of Prague families wanting to move, Dr. Radosta organizes a twelve-apartment swap he dubbed "Ball Lightning" because of its necessary speed. He is assisted by the psychologist Mr. Knotek and by Ing. Severín, who acts a quick messenger as he is the only one with a reliable car.

In order to be able to carry out the "biggest event in the history of moving", as he describes it, Dr. Radosta doesn't think twice to move the wedding of Mr. Flieger and Mrs. Opatrná to a different date and place, as the two need to be married before the swap due to legal reasons. Because of that, Mr. Knotek must stand for the groom's original best man and is then caught up in the wedding celebrations. Those end with a nightly moving exercise organized by drunk Mr. Knotek himself, who ends up sleeping at a flat of the Pivoňka family. This frustrates inspector Drahota, who then thinks of abandoning the project. Dr. Radosta manages to talk him out of it and forces Mr. Knotek to apologize in person to all involved.

Further complications are caused by Ms. Jechová, who is supposed to move into the flat of Mr. Knotek and his family. She first complains about the lack of a laundry room in the apartment block, even wanting to keep the washing machine of the Knotek family, and then criticizes the cellar coal storage, forcing Mr. Knotek to swap cellars with the unpopular neighbour Klabouch, a deed which involves him moving all of Klabouch's coal. Surprisingly, though, she praises the attic. In the end, however, it seems she might actually ruin the whole ordeal, as she decides against moving at the very last moment, unable to part with the flat she lived with her now deceased husband in. In the end, however, she allows is convinced by Dr. Radosta, who vividly describes how much she would have to pay for the caused damages.

Yet another problem appears at the very end, as the opera master Bílek appears to have died; since the apartment swap would not be valid had a participant not moved voluntarily, Dr. Radosta elects to keep his death a secret until his body is moved into his new apartment, making it seem he did indeed move voluntarily and only passed after the fact. However, Dr. Ječný was promised an antique couch of Mr. Bílek which he agreed to give out when he moves into Dr. Ječný's former apartment. Dr. Radosta eventually decides to tell Dr. Ječný the truth, but it is discovered the couch Mr. Bílek's body was kept in was swapped with a similar looking one belonging to Mr. Flieger and Mrs. Opatrná. They rush to where the second couch had been moved so that no one else can uncover the duvets, but it is revealed that Mr. Bílek did not actually die and was merely fast asleep after packing all night; in the end, then, the entire twelve apartments swap was therefore successful.

During the closing credits, we see Dr. Radosta is planning another swap, this time with twenty-four apartments, under the name "Ball Lightning II"; the names on the diagram actually belong to the crew members.

== Cast ==
- Rudolf Hrušínský as Dr. Radosta, the organizer
- Karel Kalaš as Mr. Bílek, former opera singer presumed to have died
- Josef Abrhám as Vladimír Knotek, a psychologist
- Daniela Kolářová as Věra Knotková, his wife
- Dana Vávrová as their daughter
- Daniel Beran as their son
- Milada Ježková as Anežka Jechová, the old lady who almost ruined the whole operation
- Bedřich Prokoš as Bohumil Flieger
- Zita Kabátová as Jarmila Opatrná
- Ladislav Smoljak as Ing. Severín, the messenger and also an inventor
- Zdeněk Svěrák as Dr. Ječný, a collector of antiques
- Marie Málková as Mrs. Ječná, his wife
- Jaroslav Vozáb as inspector Drahota
- Zora Božinová as Mrs. Drahotová, his wife
- Věra Kalendová as Máňa, a friend of Ms. Jechová who talks her out of moving
- Karel Bělohradský as Mr. Klabouch, a neighbour of the Knoteks
- Petr Brukner as Miroslav Pivoňka
- Vlasta Žehrová as Anděla Pivoňková, his wife
- Rudolf Vodrážka as Mr. Kadlec, one of the neighbours subjected to the "moving exercise" who is divorcing
- Karolina Slunéčková as Mrs. Kadlecová, his former wife
- David Smoljak as Jirka Kadlec, their son
- Pavel Vondruška as Mr. Flieger's and Mrs. Opatrná's wedding registrar
- Josef Koudelka Bergstein as a wedding photographer
- Vít Olmer as a violin player
- Emilie Zíchová as Mrs. Opatrná's maid of honour
- Zdeněk Srstka as a mover
- Tibor Kiss as Mr. Fazekaš, one of the apartment swappers
- Marie Kissová as Eržika Fazekašová, his wife
- Eliška Moulisová as Eržika Fazekašová Jr., their daughter
- Marie Kissová Jr. as Maruška Fazekašová Jr., their daughter
- Alena Kissová as their daughter
