= Accumulator 1 =

- Film poster
- Directed by: Jan Svěrák
- Written by: Jan Svěrák; Zdeněk Svěrák
- Produced by: Peter Soukup
- Starring: Petr Forman; Edita Brychta; Zdeněk Svěrák
- Music by: Ondřej Soukup; Jiří Svoboda
- Release date: 24 March 1994 (Czech Republic)
- Running time: 102 minutes
- Country: Czech Republic
- Languages: Czech, English
- Budget: US$2,000,000

Accumulator 1 (Czech: Akumulátor 1) is a 1994 film directed by Jan Svěrák. The film won the Grand Prize at the 7th Yubari International Fantastic Film Festival in February 1996. It won the audience award at the Tromsø International Film Festival in 1996.

== Plot ==
Young surveyor Olda (Petr Forman) is courting a girl, Jitka (Tereza Pergnerová), but his colleague Slezák (Bolek Polívka) coaxes her into bed at his home. The morally exhausted Olda does not stop them, and watches TV all night, where he appeared that day in an absurd interview. He loses consciousness for three days and ends up in a hospital room with the ageing Mikulík (Jiří Kodet). That night, mysterious healer Fišarek (Zdeněk Svěrák) appears to help them, returning lost energy to Olda. Fišarek shows him how to take energy from trees, works of art and natural phenomena. When Mikulik dies, they examine his body and realize that he died watching TV, having lost all his energy. They meet his daughter Anna (Edita Brychta).

Fišarek continues healing experiments on Olda with a company of mediums. On TV, they see an old teacher. The action moves into the television universe, inhabited by doppelgangers of people who have previously been on TV, who live a hedonistic party lifestyle, shamelessly feeding on energy from their real counterparts.

Olda finds Anna in a phone book and takes her on a date. In a cafe, drunken Slezak comes up to them, wanting to take Anna away as well, but she rejects him. Arriving at Anna's house, the couple confess their feelings for each other and go to the bedroom to make love. However, Olda accidentally turns on the TV, which again steals his energy. When he arrives to tell Fišarek, he meets the teacher from the TV show, who has experienced the same thing and reached the same conclusion. The teacher flees to a remote village without a television, while Olda stays in Prague to be close to Anna. Even in the middle of nowhere, the teacher sees a TV, and again turns to Fišarek for help.

Olda proposes marriage to Anna, but she reveals that she has a daughter. She tells him to meet her at the opera the next day. In the meantime, he buys some remote controls as protection against TV sets. Jitka visits him, complaining about Slezak and asking for forgiveness, but he rejects her and goes to meet Anna at the opera to see Nabucco. He absorbs energy from the art and goes into the street several times to store it in a batch of boards. After the opera, they drive back to Anna's. During a power cut, Olda reads Anna's daughter a fairy tale about a prince who defeated a witch by flooding her with life force from several people. He formulates a similar plan to destroy the television "mirror world", by oversaturating a TV set with energy from the charged boards.

Meanwhile, the television alter-ego is symbolically buried by media personalities, being lowered off the ship into a landfill. "Dead" media personalities can still lie down and talk, but no longer have energy. For the majority, because their originals died, but for Olda, because his original knows about the situation and does not allow energy to be stolen. He decides to escape this hopeless surreal world.

The next day, Olda gathers as much energy as possible from people in the city, and at night attempts to carry out his plan. He is interrupted by Slezak, who is looking for Jitka, and tries to start a fight, but is too drunk. Olda detonates the supply of boards in his apartment and sends the released energy across the bridge. It flows towards the television, but at the last moment Olda abandons his plan, realizing that he is standing in the path of the energy stolen from people. He releases the energy, which would otherwise destroy him, and the energy saves a falling plane instead. As the dust settles, Olda's tele-ego appears and they embrace and merge together. Slezak, who broke into Olda's apartment before the explosion, is arrested. The next morning, Olda calls Anna to apologize for the missed date and it is assumed that their relationship will continue normally. Television is no longer dangerous for him, but the global problem stays unsolved.

== Cast ==
- Petr Forman as Olda Soukup
- Edita Brychta as Anna
- Zdeněk Svěrák as Fišarek: a natural healer
- Marián Labuda as The Teacher
- Bolek Polívka as Slezák
- Tereza Pergnerová as Jitka
- Jiří Kodet as Mikulík
- Marketa Frosslová as Anička
- Ladislav Smoljak as Caretaker
- Daniela Kolářova as Mrs. Fišarkova
- Rudolf Hrušinský Jr. as Pitrýsek
- David Koller as The Cowboy
- Robert Kodym as The Indian
- Nada Safratova as Gabriela
- Ivo Kašpar as Pištek
