= Vladimír Smutný =

Czech cinematographer (1942–2025)

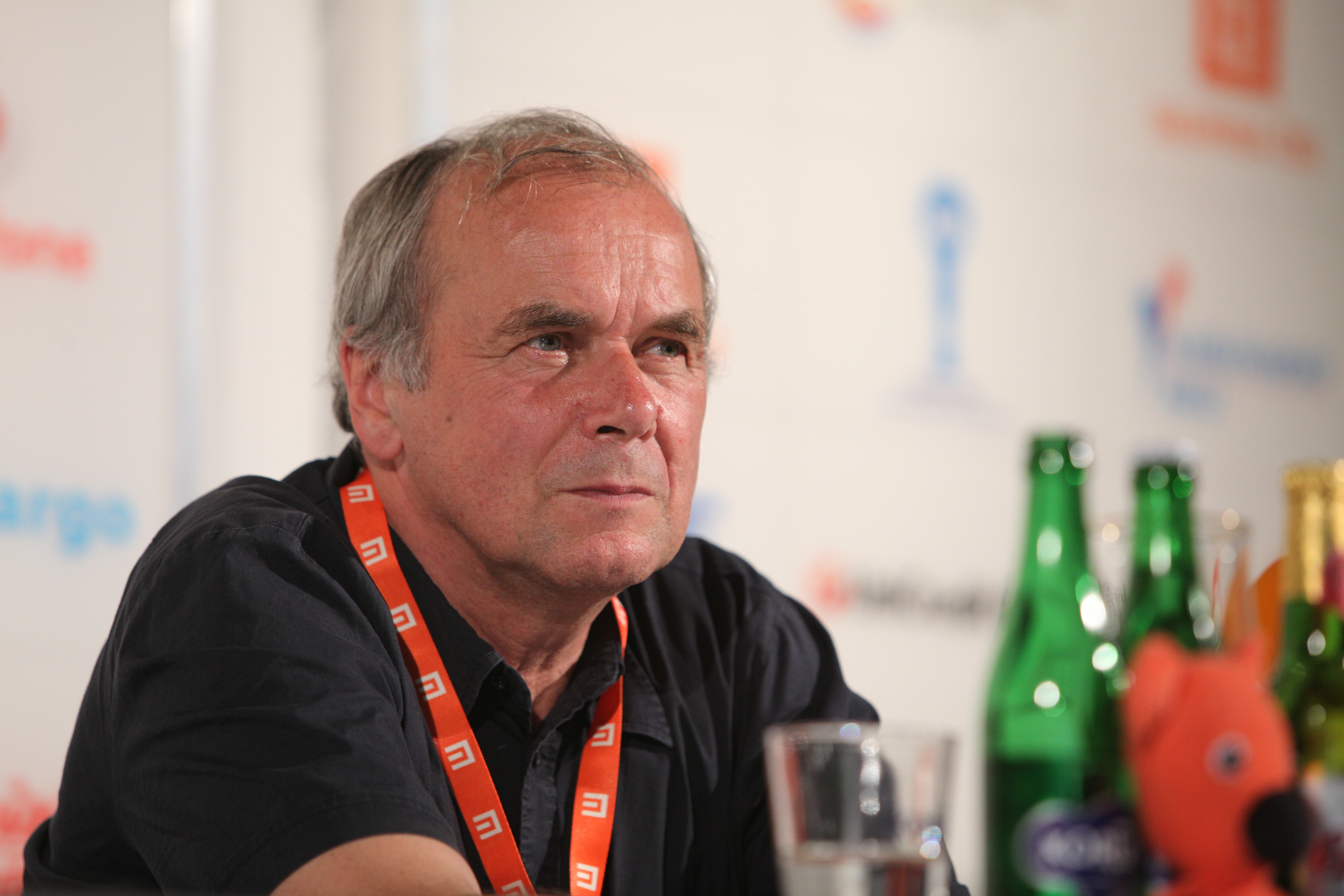
- Smutný in 2010
- Born: 13 July 1942; Prague, Protectorate of Bohemia and Moravia
- Died: 7 June 2025 (aged 82); Czech Republic
- Other name: Vladimira Lenertová - spouse Marie, Robert, Barbora, Viktor - children
- Education: Academy of Performing Arts in Prague
- Occupation: Cinematographer
- Awards: Czech Lion Award for Best Cinematography (Lea, 1997); Czech Lion Award for Best Cinematography (Dark Blue World, 2001); Czech Lion Award for Best Cinematography (Mazaný Filip, 2003); Czech Lion Award for Best Cinematography (King of Thieves, 2004); Czech Lion Award for Best Cinematography (Tobruk, 2008); Czech Lion Award for Best Cinematography (Flower Buds, 2011); Czech Lion Award for Best Cinematography (Barefoot, 2017); Medal of Merit (Petr Pavel, 2024)

Vladimír Smutný (13 July 1942 – 7 June 2025) was a Czech cinematographer. He was an eight-time winner of the Czech Lion Award for Best Cinematography. He was also a cinematographer of Academy Award for Best Foreign Language Film winner Kolya (1996).

His father was a photographer. His sister, Jitka Smutná, is an actress. After graduating from FAMU in Prague, he worked as an advertising photographer for Tesla Holešovice and as a camera operator for Krátký film Praha. From 1974 he worked as an assistant cinematographer. His first projects as director of photography were in the 1980s when he worked primarily with directors Jiří Svoboda and Karel Kachyňa. Beginning in the mid-1990s he worked primarily with directors Jan Svěrák and Václav Marhoul. From 1997 he taught at FAMU in Prague.

Smutný died on 7 June 2025, at the age of 82.

== Selected filmography ==
- Scalpel, Please (1985)
- When the Stars Were Red (1991)
- Kolya (1996)
- Lea (1997)
- Love Lies Bleeding (1999)
- Dark Blue World (2001)
- Mazaný Filip (2003)
- King of Thieves (2004)
- The Headsman (2004)
- Empties (2007)
- Tobruk (2008)
- Kooky (2010)
- Flower Buds (2011)
- Viy (2014)
- Three Brothers (2014)
- Po strništi bos (2017)
- Golden Sting (2018)
- The Painted Bird (2019)
- The Last Aristocrat (2019)

== Awards and nominations ==
- Czech Lion Award for Best Cinematography wins: Lea (1997), Dark Blue World (2001), Mazaný Filip (2003), King of Thieves (2004), Tobruk (2008), Flower Buds (2011), Po strništi bos (2017), The Painted Bird (2019)
- Czech Lion Award for Best Cinematography nominations: Kolya (1996), Empties (2007), Kooky (2010), Three Brothers (2014), Golden Sting (2018)
- Medal of Merit (2024)
