= Dissolved and Effused =

- Directed by: Ladislav Smoljak
- Written by: Ladislav Smoljak; Zdeněk Svěrák
- Starring: Jiří Zahajský; Marek Brodský; Petr Čepek; Rudolf Hrušínský
- Music by: Petr Skoumal
- Release date: 1985
- Language: Czech

Dissolved and Effused (Czech: Rozpuštěný a vypuštěný) is a 1985 Czechoslovak comedy film directed by Ladislav Smoljak.

== Synopsis ==
At the end of the Austro-Hungarian Empire, police investigator Trachta and his trainee, Hlaváček, investigate the murder of the factory owner Bierhanzl, who used duck eggs to make a miraculous ointment against baldness and mysteriously disappeared just as he was organising a large party in his villa. The clues uncovered show that he was ingeniously murdered: as the film's title suggests, he was apparently dissolved in a bathtub using sulphuric acid and his remains were dumped down the drain. Trachta and Hlaváček, in their an original way of investigation, discover (despite constant interference from the police director) that in fact quite different crimes have been committed, that the murder is only a blame, and that the supposedly drained factory owner Bierhanzel is alive, with only minor damage to his beauty. Hlaváček even manages to fall happily in love...
