= Seclusion Near a Forest =

- Czech: Na samotě u lesa
- Directed by: Jiří Menzel
- Written by: Ladislav Smoljak; Zdeněk Svěrák
- Starring: Josef Kemr; Zdeněk Svěrák; Daniela Kolářová; Marie Hradilková; Martin Hradilek; Ladislav Smoljak; Naďa Urbánková; Jan Tříska; Václav Trégl; Míla Myslíková; Vlastimil Brodský; Jaroslav Weigel
- Cinematography: Jaromír Šofr
- Edited by: Jiřina Lukešová
- Music by: Jiří Šust
- Distributed by: Ústřední půjčovna filmů
- Release date: 1 September 1976
- Running time: 95 minutes
- Country: Czechoslovakia
- Language: Czech

Seclusion Near a Forest (Czech: Na samotě u lesa) is a 1976 Czechoslovak comedy film directed by Jiří Menzel. Filming took place near Radešice (the summerhouse scenes) and in Svatý Jan (the funeral and the bar fight).

== Plot ==
An ordinary Prague family, the Lavičkas, yearn for a cottage in the countryside. One of their friends has managed to get a country residence by living in a decommissioned mill. Another is building a house there from scratch and has hired a bricklayer—who lets his employer do all the work. A third has succeeded in buying a cottage but with its elderly former owners still in residence, and is trying to evict them by such means as digging a moat across the front door and stopping up their chimney.

Undeterred by such obstacles, the Lavičkas visit a cottage belonging to a charismatic old farmer, Mr. Komárek (Josef Kemr), and are charmed by it, despite a few rotting floorboards and an odor of mildew. Mr. Komárek, to their surprise, offers to sell them the house, saying that he plans to sell his cow, sow no new crops, and move to Slovakia to live with his son. In the meantime, he will rent them a room. After Toník, a friend of Mr. Komárek's, puts a new floor in the spare bedroom, the Lavičkas move in. Their children almost immediately start addressing Mr. Komárek as Grandpa and join him in collecting eggs from the chickens and in listening to fairy tales read aloud on the radio. Fleas, free-roaming chickens, and a lack of electricity get on the nerves of Věra Lavičková, but her husband, Oldřich, remains smitten with country life.

Unfortunately, Mr. Komárek shows no sign of selling his cow or taking any other steps toward vacating the premises. Oldřich even makes the alarming discovery that Mr. Komárek has a father who is ninety-two and still hearty. In the end the Lavičkas must accept that their life in the country will have to be a shared one.
