= Barefoot (2017 film) =

2017 Czech war comedy film

- Directed by: Jan Svěrák
- Written by: Zdeněk Svěrák, Jan Svěrák
- Starring: Ondřej Vetchý, Tereza Voříšková, Alois Grec
- Cinematography: Vladimír Smutný
- Edited by: Alois Fišárek
- Music by: Michal Novinski
- Production companies: Biograf Jan Svěrák, Phoenix Film, Novinski, Czech Television, Rozhlas a televízia Slovenska, Barrandov Studios, innogy
- Release date: 16 August 2017
- Running time: 111 minutes
- Countries: Czech Republic; Slovakia; Denmark
- Language: Czech
- Budget: 50 million CZK
- Box office: 65 million CZK

Po strništi bos (English - Barefoot, or Barefoot on Stalks) is a 2017 Czech war comedy film directed by Jan Svěrák. It is a prequel to The Elementary School.

== Plot ==
The film follows the young boy Eda Souček and his extended family during World War II. The family has to move to his family's home in the countryside home because Eda's father refuses to Heil in his job. Eda makes new friends and gets used to life in village. He also meets his uncle who is known as Vlk. Vlk doesn't get along with rest of the family because he tried to strangle his mother. Eda eventually befriends Vlk. Life in the village is influenced by war.

== Cast ==
- Alois Grec as Eda
- Tereza Voříšková as Mother
- Ondřej Vetchý as Father
- Oldřich Kaiser as Vlk
- Jan Tříska as Grandfather
- Viera Pavlíková as Grandmother
- Hynek Čermák as Uncle
- Petra Špalková as Aunt
- Zdeněk Svěrák as Headmaster
- Václav Hubka as Ota
- Niklas Klinecký as Satík
- Josef Bedlivý as Prcek
- Petr Uhlík as Vlastík
- Sebastian Pošmourný as Škaloud
- Zuzana Stivínová as Vlk's Wife
- Miroslav Hanuš as Bartoš
- Petr Brukner as Chrást
- Miroslav Táborský as Košťál
