= Zdeněk Matějček =

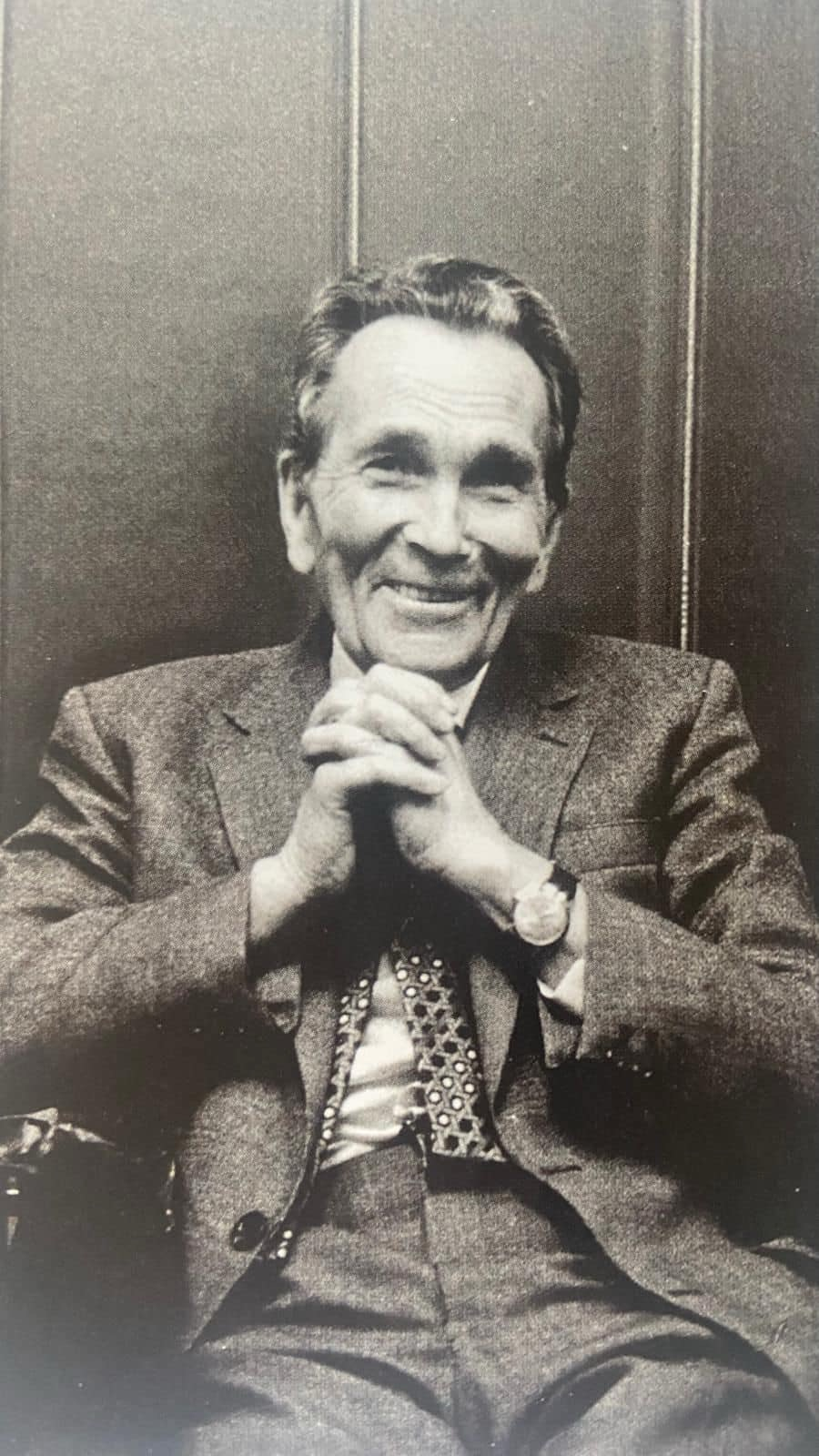
Zdeněk Matějček

Zdeněk Matějček (16 August 1922 – 26 October 2004) was a Czech child psychologist, researcher, and childcare reformer, who pioneered the study of the institutional conditions of raising children in an environment of psychological deprivation. He was a significant reformer of child care, emphasising the irreplaceable role of the family. He was known for studies of the effects on children of being held in prison camps during World War II, was a co-founder and the first chairman of an association that involved animals, such as dogs and horses, in child therapy, and was the principal organizer of a meeting of the International Association for Research in Learning Disabilities, held in Prague on 2–5 October 1989. He placed 93rd on Největší Čech.

== Early life ==
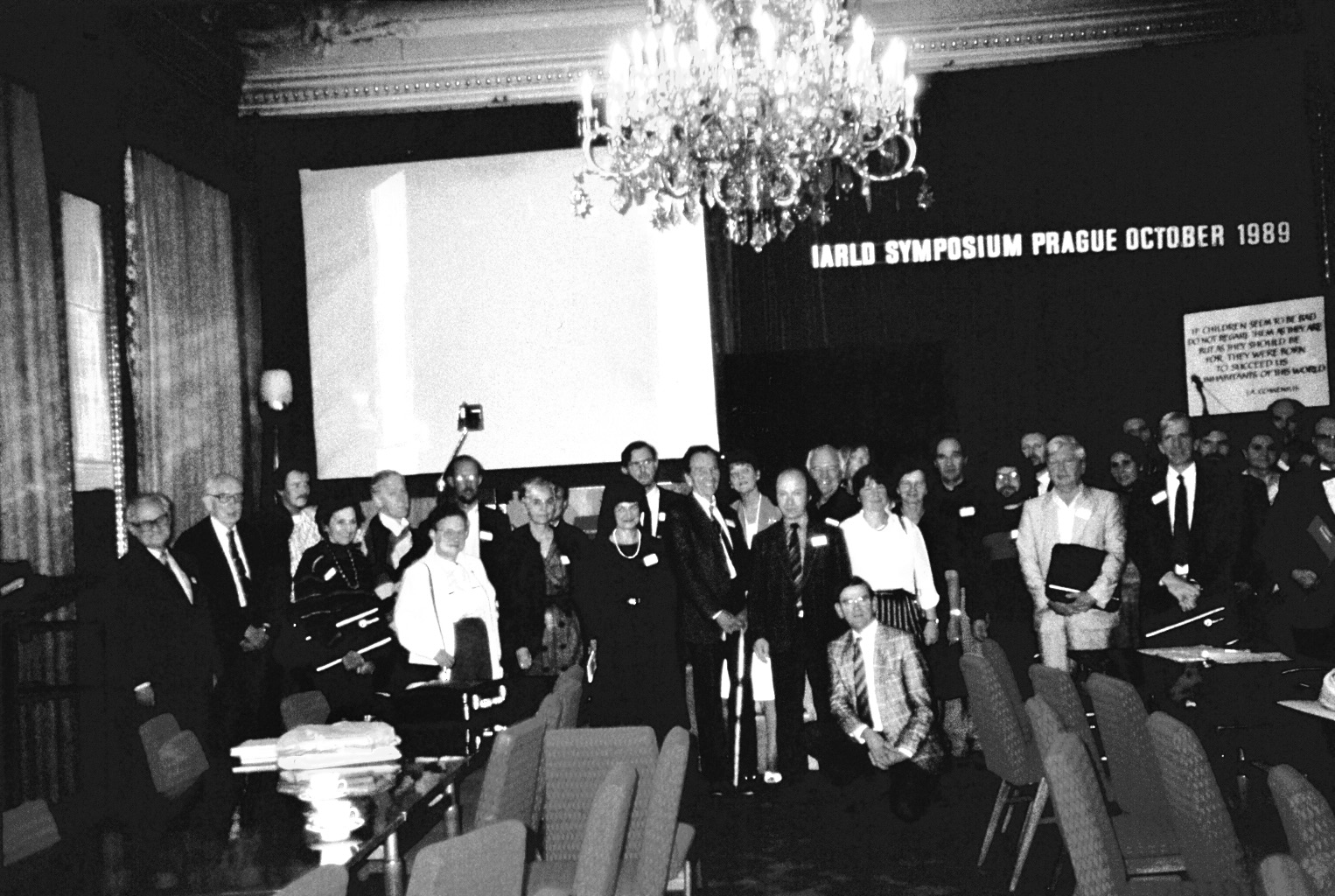
Attendees of the IARLD Convention in Prague, Czechoslovakia, 2–5 October 1989

Matějček was born in 1922 in Kladruby nad Labem, Czechoslovakia. His father was a director of the Kladruby nad Labem Stud Farm, where he lived until his adulthood with his parents and a younger brother. His parents were Czech evangelists. After graduating from Pardubice High School he was not allowed to study due to the war, and so he assisted his father at the horse farm as a regular worker, and later at Bata shoe company in Zlín.

After the war Matějček studied at the Faculty of Arts of Charles University, hoping to become a teacher. He graduated with a degree in Czech and philosophy (which at the time included psychology), and as he had already studied it, he decided to become a psychologist. From 1950 to 1951 he worked briefly at an educational institute, before he started working at the Sociodiagnostic Institute of Prague, focusing on developmental research on children in orphanages and children's homes. The institute, focused on child care, disorder and handicap diagnostics and therapy, was ahead of its time in involving an entire team of experts in the diagnostic process, including psychologists, doctors, and social workers. Close attention was paid to the functioning of the family. At the institute Matějček started his cooperation with Josef Langmeier, and together they created an original and innovative approach to understanding mental deprivation, defining the mental needs of children and the consequences of unfulfilled basic needs. Based on regular and long-standing study of children in children's homes – conditions depriving them of many of their basic psychological and social needs – the authors proved that institutional care presents a great risk to a child's mental and social development, and its negative consequences continue their impact on these children throughout their lives. Together they coined a new psychological term, "mental deprivation", publishing their findings in the book Childhood Mental Deprivation, which attracted great attention locally, running into four editions, as well as internationally, where it was translated into English, German and Russian.

== Later life ==
From 1953 until 1969 he worked at a Psychiatry clinic for children in Prague. After that he accepted an invitation from Josef Švejcar and joined the Institute for Further Education of Doctors and Pharmacists in the Department of Pediatrics as an assistant professor. Here, he resumed his cooperation with Langmeier. Together they finalised their pedagogy and clinical research and founded the Prague School of Clinical Psychology and Psychological Counselling. Matějček supervised many theses, which proved fruitful when he founded the Professor Matějček Foundation to reward the best theses on child developmental psychology. Gradually, he gained a reputation as an expert on psychology. He published and lectured throughout Czechoslovakia as well as abroad. He also dedicated himself to dyslexia and was a co-founder of SOS children's villages in the Czech Republic. From 1991 until the end of his life he worked at the Psychiatry Center in Prague and from 1994 in Paprsek child centre. He devoted himself to creating new diagnostic tools, adapting diagnostic methods (drawing of a family) and translating Gesell's Maturational Theory as well as other diagnostic methods.

He was a member of many professional organizations in the Czech Republic, including the Czech Doctors Academy and Czech and Moravian Psychological Society, as well as international groups including the International Dyslexia Association and the International Study Group on Children with Special Education Needs. He was granted numerous awards and received worldwide recognition, such as the American Psychological Association's award for Distinguished Contribution to Research in Public Policy, and an honorary doctorate from the University of Saskatchewan.

He authored and co-authored many books on parenting, child care, dyslexia and psychological deprivation.

Matějček died in Prague on 26 October 2004.

== Work ==
Parenting books (in Czech)

- What Children Need Most? Essays in child psychology. (Co děti nejvíc potřebují? Eseje z dětské psychologie, Praha, Portál 1995.)
- What, When, and How in Parenting (Co, kdy a jak ve výchově dětí, Praha, Portál 2007.)
- Harmony or hassle? (Po dobrém, nebo po zlém? Praha, Portál 2007.)
- Parents and Children (Rodiče a děti, Praha, Avicenum 1989.)
- How and Why Children Give us Headaches (Jak a proč nás trápí děti, Praha, Grada, 1997.)
- The Greatest Journey. First three years in child care. (Rodičům na nejhezčí cestu, Praha, H&H, 2004.)
- First 6 years in Child Development and Parenting: psychologist's views on developmental standards and milestones, basic psychological needs, child and human world (Prvních 6 let ve vývoji a výchově dítěte: normy vývoje a vývojové milníky z pohledu psychologa, základní duševní potřeby dítěte, dítě a lidský svět)

Foster care books (in Czech)

- What to Say to an Adopted Child (Co řekneme osvojenému dítěti), Prague, Práce 1982.
- On family (O rodině vlastní, nevlastní a náhradní), Prague, Portál 1994.

Articles and books in English

- Matějček, Z. Dyslexia, an international problem: A report from Czechoslovakia, Bulletin of the Orton Society, 1968, Volume 18, Issue 1. pp 13–22.
- Langmeier, J., Matějček, Z. Psychological Deprivation in Childhood, 1976, University of Queensland Press.
