= Jan Svěrák =

Czech film director and screenwriter (born 1965)

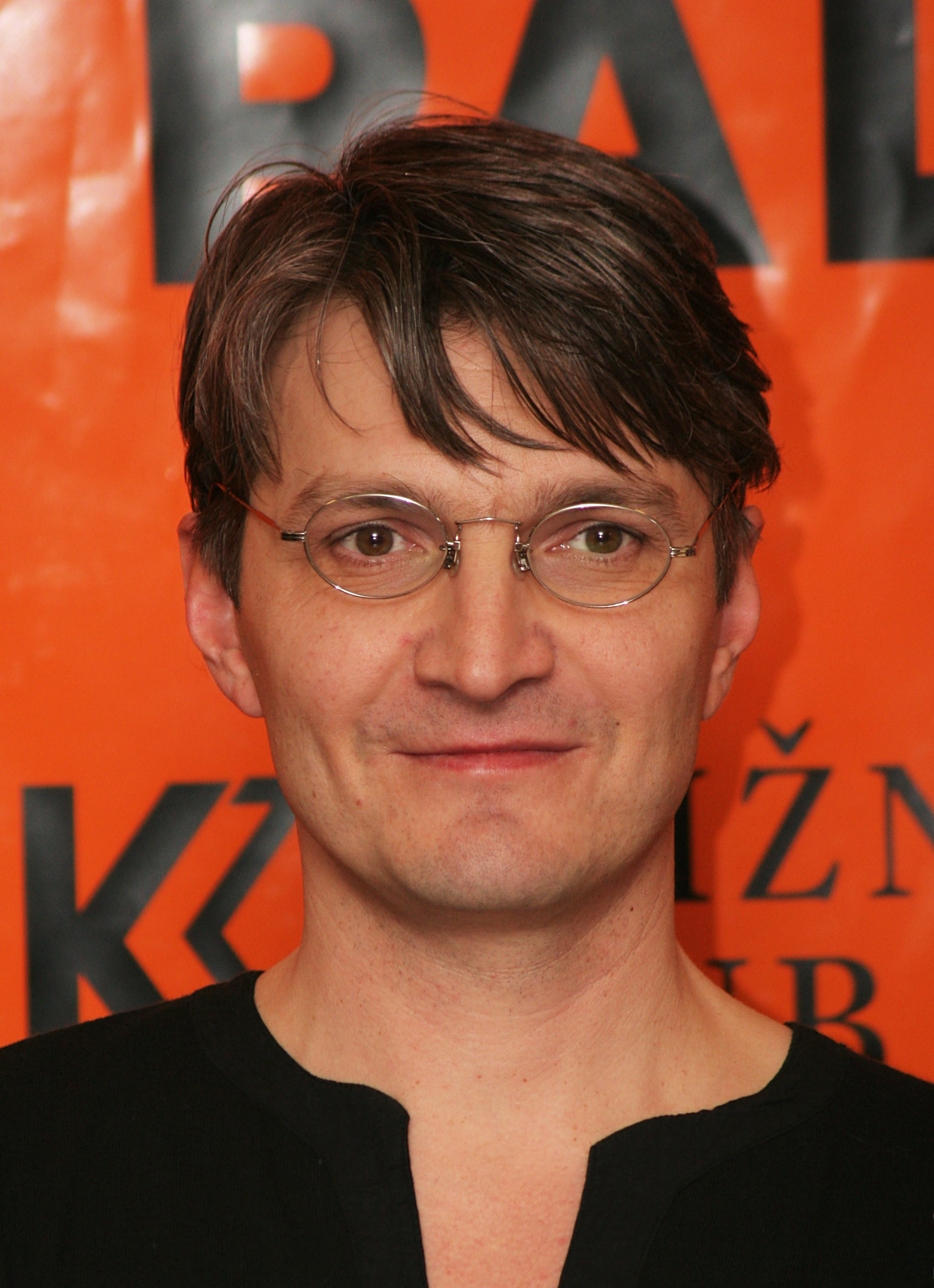
- Jan Svěrák in 2007
- Born: 6 February 1965 (age 61); Žatec, Czechoslovakia
- Education: Academy of Performing Arts in Prague
- Occupations: Film director, screenwriter
- Years active: 1988–present

Jan Svěrák (Czech pronunciation: [ˈjan ˈsvjɛraːk]; born 6 February 1965) is a Czech film director and screenwriter. He is the son of screenwriter and actor Zdeněk Svěrák, with whom he collaborated on his most successful films. He is among the most recognised Czech filmmakers. His best-known films are the Oscar-winning Kolya and the Oscar-nominated The Elementary School.

== Life ==
Jan Svěrák was born on 6 February 1965 in Žatec, into a family of pedagogues. About one year after his birth, the family moved to Prague and his father Zdeněk Svěrák became a screenwriter and actor. He made his first amateur filmmaking attempts at the age of twelve. As a teenager, he earned extra money by working at the Barrandov Studios. He originally wanted to be a cameraman, but graduated from the documentary filmmaking at Film and TV School of the Academy of Performing Arts in Prague (1983–1988).

Jan Svěrák is married and has three children, sons František and Ondřej, and daughter Kateřina. František became a film editor and collaborated with his father on the film Bethlehem Night (2022).

== Work ==
Svěrák is considered one of the most talented and successful Czech filmmakers, which is why he is sometimes nicknamed the "Czech Spielberg". His mockumentary debut Oil Gobblers (1988) won student Academy Award for Best Student Film. His notable work includes the films Kolya (1996), which won the Academy Award for Best Foreign Language Film, and The Elementary School (1991), nominated on the Academy Award. The success of these films caused him to receive offers from Hollywood to direct The Cider House Rules (1999) and Chocolat (2000), but he declined. His other successful film is the fairy-tale film Three Brothers, which was the most-attended film in Czech cinemas in 2014.

Svěrák has appeared in cameo roles in several films, including An Uncertain Season (1987), An Ambiguous Report About the End of the World (1997), Rebelové (2001), Román pro ženy (2005), Guard No. 47 (2008) and Barefoot (2017).

=== Filmography ===
Year	English title	Czech title	Director	Writer	Awards
1988	Oil Gobblers	Ropáci	Yes	Yes	Student Academy Award for Best Student Film
1991	The Elementary School	Obecná škola	Yes	No	Nomination for Academy Award
1994	The Ride	Jízda	Yes	Yes	Crystal Globe Award at Karlovy Vary Festival
1994	Accumulator 1	Akumulátor 1	Yes	Yes	
1996	Kolya	Kolja	Yes	No	Academy Award for Best Foreign Language Film, Czech Lion Award for Best Director
2001	Dark Blue World	Tmavomodrý svět	Yes	No	Czech Lion Award for Best Director
2004	Tatínek	Daddy	Yes	No	
2007	Empties	Vratné lahve	Yes	No	Czech Lion Award for Best Director
2010	Kooky	Kuky se vrací	Yes	Yes	
2014	Three Brothers	Tři bratři	Yes	No	
2017	Barefoot	Po strništi bos	Yes	Yes	
2022	Bethlehem Night	Betlémské světlo	Yes	Yes	
2026	Five Plums	Pět švestek	Yes	Yes	

=== Literary and theatre work ===
After filming Barefoot (2017), Jan Svěrák expressed a desire to retreat into seclusion, away from popularity. He began writing the memoirs Světakrásy ('World Beauties'), which was published in 2023. His other books are the child book Kuky se vrací (2010), based on his film of the same name, and Bohemia (a novel published in 2019).

In 2024, his first theatre play, Dobré ráno s Findou ('Good Morning with Finda'), debuted.
