= Jára Cimrman Lying, Sleeping =

1983 Czechoslovak comedy film

- Directed by: Ladislav Smoljak
- Written by: Ladislav Smoljak; Zdeněk Svěrák
- Produced by: Jan Balzer
- Starring: Zdeněk Svěrák
- Cinematography: Richard Valenta
- Edited by: Jiří Brožek
- Music by: Petr Skoumal
- Release date: 1983
- Running time: 81 minutes
- Country: Czechoslovakia
- Language: Czech

Jára Cimrman Lying, Sleeping (Czech: Jára Cimrman ležící, spící) is a 1983 Czechoslovak comedy film directed by Ladislav Smoljak. It is a biopic of the fictional Czech national hero Jára Cimrman, who is portrayed by one of his inventors, Zdeněk Svěrák.

The story is framed by an excursion to Liptákov, the (fictional) village where Cimrman allegedly spent the final years of his life. The retrospective passages, which make up most of the film, span Cimrman's whole "known" life, where he interacts with many personalities of Czech and European science and culture in the Belle Époque. A large portion of the film deals with Cimrman's acting as a tutor in the family of Franz Ferdinand d'Este, the heir presumptive of Austria-Hungary. In this role Cimrman is secretly aiming to "split the monarchy".

== Cast ==
- Zdeněk Svěrák - Jára Cimrman (as Zdeněk Svěrák and Company)
- Valerie Kaplanová - the museum guide
- Petr Čepek - Archduke Franz Ferdinand d'Este / Nývlt, his double
- Josef Abrhám - Theatrical researcher
- Libuše Šafránková - Alžběta
- Ladislav Frej - Marold, painter
- Jiří Zahajský - Dr. Emil Holub, explorer
- Marie Drahokoupilová - the tour courier
- Míla Myslíková - Headmistress
- Jaroslav Vozáb - translator
- Vladimír Svitáček - Professor Kingsley
- Milena Dvorská - Duchess d'Este
- Jiří Kostka - Emperor Franz Joseph I / Macháně, his double
- Petr Kostka - Mánes, painter
- Pavel Vondruška - Johann Strauss II
