= Empties =

2007 film by Jan Svěrák

- Australian theatrical release poster
- Original title: Vratné lahve
- Directed by: Jan Svěrák
- Written by: Zdeněk Svěrák
- Produced by: Eric Abraham; Jan Svěrák
- Starring: Zdeněk Svěrák
- Cinematography: Vladimír Smutný
- Edited by: Alois Fišárek
- Music by: Ondřej Soukup
- Production companies: Biograf Jan Svěrák; Phoenix Film Investments; Portobello Pictures; TV Nova; UFO Pictures
- Distributed by: Falcon; Icon (Australia)
- Release date: 8 March 2007
- Running time: 100 minutes
- Countries: Czech Republic; UK
- Language: Czech
- Budget: CZK 34 million
- Box office: CZK 124.6 million

Empties (Czech: Vratné lahve) is a 2007 film directed by Jan Svěrák and written by his father Zdeněk Svěrák, who also stars in the film. It was released first in the Czech Republic in March 2007. The film is a comedy from the same team which made Kolya.

== Plot ==
Josef Tkaloun is an elderly teacher at a high school in Prague who cannot control his anger when his pupils misbehave in his poetry class. He quits his job and despite his wife urging him to retire, becomes a cycle courier. After an inevitable accident, he still refuses to stay at home and takes a job in the local Žižkov supermarket. He works behind a counter, recycling glass beer bottles. There he begins to flirt with the customers and matchmake both for an old friend and for the man he works with. His own flirtations (and sexually charged dreams) almost get him into trouble with his wife, so he resolves to reignite the passion in his marriage by celebrating his wedding anniversary with a hot air balloon ride. The scary balloon ride, ending in crash, revitalizes the relationship.

== Cast ==
- Zdeněk Svěrák as Josef Tkaloun
- Tatiana Vilhelmová as Helenka, his daughter
- Daniela Kolářová as Eliška Tkalounová
- Jiří Macháček as Landa, his friend
- Pavel Landovský as Řezáč

== Awards ==
- Zdeněk Svěrák received a Special Jury Mention for the screenplay at the 2007 Karlovy Vary International Film Festival.
- The film received the Audience Award at 2007 Ljubljana International Film Festival.
- The film received the Gold Dolphin award for Best Film at the Festroia International Film Festival in 2008.
- The film received the Gold Prize for Best Film at Damascus International Film Festival in 2008.

== Home media ==
The DVD was released in October 2007. It includes extra scenes, a photo gallery, the storyboard and comics.
