= Jára Cimrman =

Czech fictional character of a universal genius, also known as "the Master"

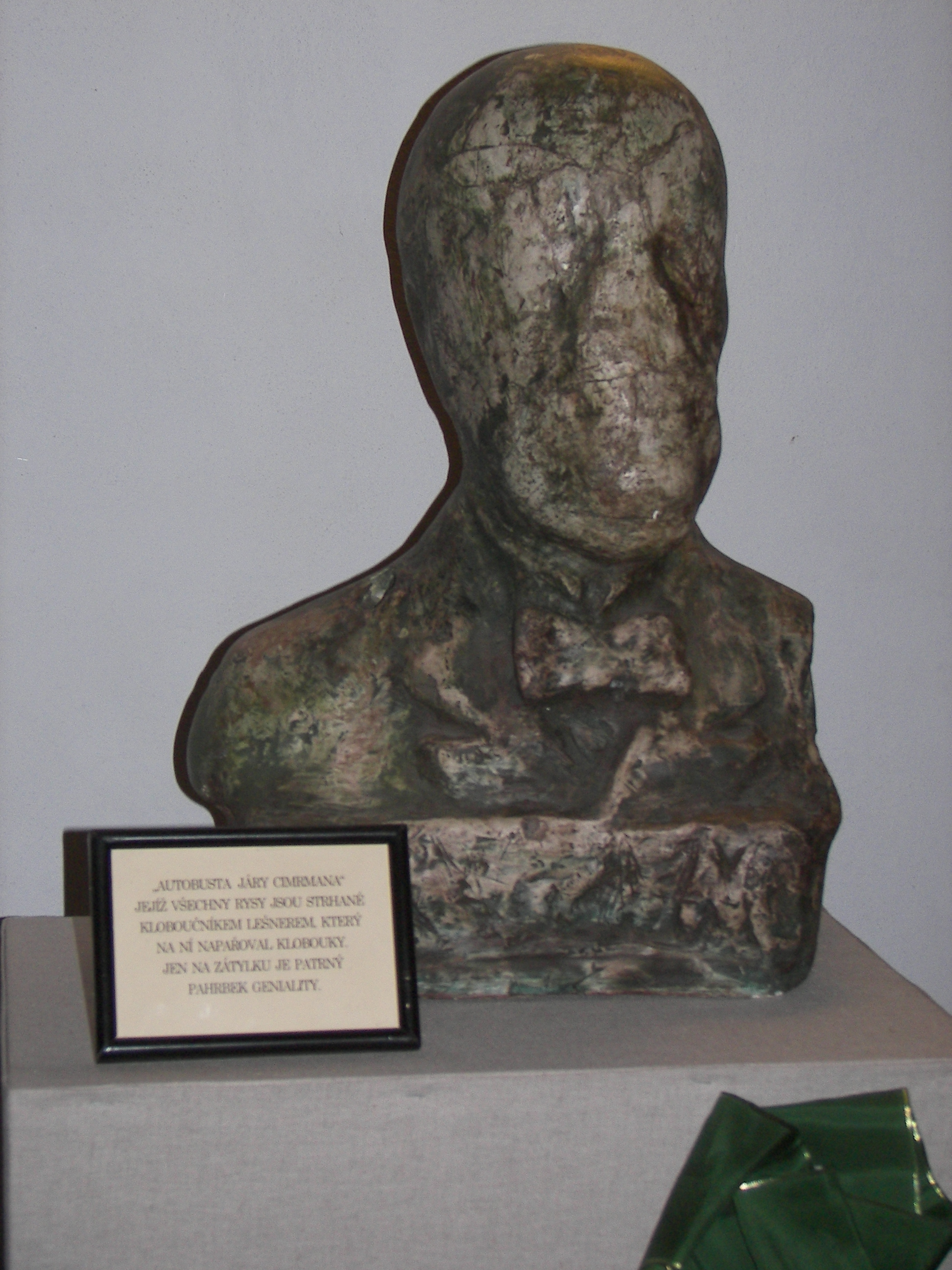
Jára Cimrman, an alleged "auto-bust" showing the bearer's "worn-out features". Theatrical property of Jára Cimrman Theatre.

Jára Cimrman or Jára da Cimrman (officially Jaroslav Cimrman) (Czech pronunciation: [ˈjaːra ˈtsɪmr̩man]), also known as "the Master", is a fictional Czech polymath, created by Ladislav Smoljak, Jiří Šebánek and Zdeněk Svěrák. The fictional personality is presented as a universal genius, and one of the greatest Czech playwrights, poets, composers, teachers, travellers, philosophers, inventors, detectives, mathematicians, and sportsmen of the 19th and early 20th century. Playing along with the pretence of his real existence is part of his characterization.

Cimrman made his first appearance on a regular radio programme Nealkoholická vinárna U Pavouka ("The Non-Alcoholic Wine Bar chez Spider") on 23 December 1966. Although the character was originally meant to be a modest caricature of the Czech people, history, and culture, he became an immensely popular protagonist of modern Czech folklore, and an ersatz national hero. In 2005, Jára Cimrman won a public vote for the title of "The Greatest Czech" (he was subsequently disqualified due to being a fictional character).

Cimrman is both the major character and the putative author of a great number of books, plays, and films. Jára Cimrman Theatre in Žižkov is one of Prague's most frequented theatre houses.

== History ==
The character was invented in 1966 for a regular radio programme Nealkoholická vinárna U Pavouka ("The Non-Alcoholic Wine Bar chez Spider"), set in U Pavouka, a fictional wine bar in Prague that was presented to listeners as real, but perennially sold out well in advance of recordings. One show featured a guest interview with a musicologist who claimed to have discovered, during a renovation of his cottage, a tranche of documents relating to a forgotten Czech polymath who lived in the late 19th and early 20th centuries, named Jara Cimrman, the first mention of the character. On subsequent shows the joke was extended as more and more documents, detailing other aspects of Cimrman's life and his theatrical work, were found in an increasing variety of places. Cimrman's character and stories were located in the Austria-Hungary era as a pastiche of Czech nationalism, but also to allow the writers to criticise the contemporary communist regime without detection. As the authors later recalled, the mystification of presenting the new discovery of a forgotten Czech genius was successful. Some listeners recognised it as humorous, some called for punishment for those who tried to deceive people, and others (at least in the beginning) believed the stories.

In 1967 Jiří Šebánek, together with Miloň Čepelka, Ladislav Smoljak and Zdeněk Svěrák, founded the Jára Cimrman Theatre. The first play, written by Svěrák and attributed to Cimrman/Svěrák, was called Akt ("The Nude"), and premiered in October 1967. Jiří Šebánek later left the theatre and in 1980 founded Salon Cimrman. People from the Jára Cimrman Theatre and Salon Cimrman call themselves "cimrmanologists", and pretend to be enthusiastic scholars who explore and analyse Cimrman's life and work. The plays all follow a similar format; the first half is a seminar in the style of a communist-era public meeting, with the actors taking turns to come onstage and present their "findings", then a comic dramatisation of the topics discussed in the seminar follows in the second half. Salon Cimrman focuses just on lectures supplemented by brief sketches or songs. In total 16 Cimrman plays have been produced.

In 1983 Ladislav Smoljak directed the film Jára Cimrman Lying, Sleeping (Czech: Jára Cimrman ležící, spící), a biopic of Cimrman with Zdeněk Svěrák in the title role, and in 1984 Smoljak and Svěrák made a detective film comedy Dissolved and Effused (Czech: Rozpuštěný a vypuštěný), based on the theatre play Vražda v salónním coupé ("Murder in a Chair Carriage"), the putative author of which was Jára Cimrman. Additionally, in 1987 the authors made a film An Uncertain Season (Czech: Nejistá sezóna), a mostly autobiographical bittersweet comedy about the theatre's difficulties during the Communist normalization era. In this film Cimrman's name is never mentioned and the putative author of the plays is referred to throughout as "the Master".

Cimrmanologists have also written several books on Jára Cimrman:

- J. Šebánek, L. Smoljak, Z. Svěrák, K. Velebný: Jára da Cimrman (1970)
- J. Klusák, J. Šebánek, L. Smoljak, Z. Svěrák, K. Velebný: Cimrman v říši hudby ("Cimrman in the World of Music", 1971)
- J. Šebánek: Já, Jára Cimrman ("I, Jára Cimrman", 1991)

A museum about Jára Cimrman's inventions was opened in the basement of the Petřín Lookout Tower in Prague in 2002.

== Greatest Czech contest ==
In early 2005, the Czech Television (ČT) started a contest to choose The Greatest Czech (inspired by the British show 100 Greatest Britons). By 15 January it seemed that most of the votes (by SMS, the Internet or mail) had gone to Jára Cimrman. However, ČT decided to disqualify Cimrman, saying that only real people were eligible for the contest, a decision that was strongly criticized by the public. An online petition was launched to keep Cimrman eligible. The popular support for Cimrman caused ČT to create a special category for fictional characters to recognize Cimrman's popularity, and Czech Television also made a documentary about him; however, they did not reinstate him to the main contest.

== Jára Cimrman as a character ==
=== Early life ===
The son of Leopold Cimrman, a Czech tailor working in Vienna, and Marlén Cimrmanová, born Jelinková, an Austrian actress, Cimrman was said to have been born in either 1853 or 1859 (though sometimes other years have been cited as required). Of possible Jewish heritage, Cimrman's name was originally spelt "Zimrman", like the German surname "Zimmermann", and he changed it later on as a mark of his Czech patriotism. Cimrman attended Czech and German schools in Vienna, and continued his studies in Prague. Due to the family's poverty, Cimrman's parents dressed him in second-hand clothes from his sister Luisa, and sent him to a girls' school, hiding his identity from him. When he discovered the truth aged 15, it triggered an identity crisis but is also said to have been the moment when his genius emerged. No pictures of Cimrman are said to have been found and so his appearance is unknown.

=== Contributions ===
As mentioned in his plays, some of Jára Cimrman's achievements and contributions include:

- He proposed the Panama Canal to the U.S. government, while composing a libretto for an opera of the same name.
- He reformed the school system in Galicia.
- With Count Zeppelin he constructed the first rigid airship using Swedish steel and Czech wicker (the wicker being for the cabin).
- He was deported from Germany as an anarchist, his personal documents carrying a note that he was "a source of unrest." This led the Swiss company Omega to offer him a job to improve the unrest—balance wheel—for their Piccolo line of ladies watches. (N.B. the Czech and German words for a watch's balance wheel ("nepokoj", "Unruhe") mean "unrest.") While in Switzerland, he introduced (and practised for some time) the field of obstetrics.
- He conducted investigations into the life of cannibalistic tribes in the Arctic; and once, while running away from one furious tribe, he missed the North Pole by just seven meters, thus almost becoming the first human reaching the North Pole.
- In Paraguay, he created the first puppet-show.
- In Vienna he established the school of criminology, music and ballet.
- He corresponded with George Bernard Shaw for many years, without response.
- He invented yogurt.
- He helped many great scientists: He carried on his own back the 45 tubs of pitchblende to the basement of Pierre and Marie Curie, he assisted Prof. Burian with his first plastic surgery, he reworked the electrical contact on Thomas Edison's first light bulb, and he found a sublet for Gustave Eiffel.
- He is the creator of the philosophy of Externism.
- Because of his enthusiasm for natural sciences, he discovered the monopole (as opposed to the then well known dipole), but this discovery fell into obscurity until it was revived by 20th century economists. The joke hinges on the similarity between the Czech words "monopol" (monopoly) - and "monopól" (monopole).
- He advised Mendeleev, after seeing the first draft, that the Periodic Table should be rotated to its current orientation.
- It is said that when Alexander Graham Bell invented the telephone, he found 3 missed calls from Jára Cimrman upon making his first connection.

Another one of his great inventions was also the internet itself, although without the widespread use of computers. Due to the technologies available at the time he had to rely on telephones. His internet basically consisted of an old circus tent where the maestro arranged the telephone apparatus for various pensioned high school teachers to answer all kinds of questions people asked. The well known WWW prefix also originated here. One of the teachers' name was Weber and since he stuttered, he introduced himself as "W-W-W.Weber." His achievements in this field went even further, thanks to Mr. Šustr, who was responsible for answering biologically themed questions. Šustr incorporated field mice in each response (e.g.: African elephant's weight was equivalent to 30,000 mice, a weasel was 1.5 times faster than a mouse, etc.). This marks the first recorded use of mouse as a peripheral in computer technology.

==== Pedagogue ====
Most of the pedagogical work of Jára Cimrman is presented in the play Vyšetřování ztráty třídní knihy ("Investigation of the Loss of a Class Book", 1967).

Cimrman became a teacher in the small Galician village of Struk ("teat"), as a punishment by court, when it was revealed he could both read and write.

A practitioner of his "Futurism" ideology, he also prepared his students for the future practical use of phones, which were being slowly installed throughout the empire at that time. He created in them such a euphoria, that when the first phones arrived, many of his current and former students began throwing whole fortunes into the phones, calling random numbers; many of them went home from the telephone booths completely penniless and became beggars.

He also revolutionized his small town schooling methods. Knowing that the cohort is bound to forget at least a part of the lecture, his system was based on dividing the lectured subjects into clearly marked "Forget-me-not" and "Not-forget-me-not" sections. The former was one-tenth of all the learning volume and was meant to be remembered, while the latter made up the nine-tenths of the given subject and was intended from the start to be forgotten.

As a teacher, he was putting his pupils under controlled exposure to stress in order to improve information retention of the germane parts of the curriculum —he either snapped his whip hard against the floor or removed his wig ("úlek oslněním" – "fright by daze"). This apparently successful method bears his name to this day as the famous "Cimrman's Fixation by Shock".

When students misbehaved, he did not punish them but punished himself instead—his theory was that pupils certainly must love their teacher and therefore would feel remorse if he should suffer. When his students put water into his ink-bottle instead of ink, he would not leave his house for a week. His students having had no school then had enough free time to feel sorry for him. Alternately he would refuse to have his cigarette after lunch and stating: "Today, after lunch, I will not smoke my cigar ("viržínko"). Don't cry, it's your fault."

==== Playwright ====
Jára Cimrman is claimed to have authored numerous plays, many of which are said to have been lost. These plays include Posel světla (English "Herald of Light"), featuring his own comic vision of the future world where people are all good to each other and so a person may act as a complete heartless monster without any remorse.

Another play presented as a work of Cimrman is Záskok ("The Stand-in"), which portrays actors of a fictional amateur theatre, performing a play that is messed up by a famous and reportedly brilliant, yet in reality dumb person who cannot forget to say other people's lines and lines from other plays and who cannot even remember the name of his own character.

Cimrman never received great fame as a playwright in his lifetime, often because of his innovatory practices, such as changing the length of the play in several successive performances or presenting new ideas. He is stated to have sent many of his plays to Ladislav Stroupežnický (a famous Czech playwright) under his name and two pseudonyms, forming such a bundle of rejected works that Stroupežnický recalls they "cost him 60 working days". He also encouraged Cimrman not to write to him and if possible "not to write at all". After Cimrman replied on a familiar note, because they both studied at the same school, Stroupežnický never recovered.

One of the plays, also said to be lost, which was a subject of their correspondence, was Čechové na Řípu (English: "Czechs on Říp"), a fictional account of an old Bohemian legend, which is here said to feature not only the legendary Forefather Czech, but also other characters as Forefather German, Forefather Jew and, in dialogue only, Forefather Gipsy, by which Cimrman wanted to honour all major nationalities living in Bohemia. The play was later re-done and its name changed to Čechové na řípu ("Czechs for Beet", changing just uppercase "Ř" into lower case "ř"), in order to motivate people to work at a sugar refinery in Klánovice.

Another man, whom Cimrman is said to have surprised with his works was Jacob Durman, director of the Royal Chamber Theatre in Haag, who, after reading his play Prázdniny s kanibalem Dufkem ("Vacation with cannibal Dufek") is said not to "come out of astonishment." Cimrman replied: "Dear Mr. Durman, the theatre is here mainly so that the spectator shall be astonished. I am sending you five more plays."

Many of Cimrman's unsuccessful plays are reported to be performed by his infamous theatrical group Lipany. Cimrman's theatre still possesses the original properties from the play Akt (English: "The Nude"), through which the author himself left the stage. Cimrmanologists admit that Cimrman has failed to obtain any recognition in this field (as well as in any other) because his methods were far too ahead of his time. This is also in strong contrast with the fact that he brilliantly helped Anton Chekhov with his play (advising him that two sisters are not enough).

==== Cimrman's special acting methods ====
===== "Vichr z hor" =====
Vichr z hor ("The Gale from the Mountains") was a sketch used on stage when the audience displayed a certain degree of unrest with the performance. It was a way of leaving the stage quickly and inconspicuously, with minimal to no damage to actors or scene. When the actors, or Cimrman himself sensed the danger, two members of the ensemble started making seemingly irrelevant comments that there's a wind picking up on stage. Calling it Gale from the mountains, they kept making remarks on the fierce strength of the wind, which was by that point ripping and carrying objects away (the remaining personnel carried the scene pieces on a carriage standing by). When all that remained on scene were the two actors, the lights went off. This was a signal for the duo to announce, that a storm has arrived and whoever in the audience moves will be struck down by lightning. This impression was further supported by the noise of the carriage leaving the theatre area, further simulating thunder. After making sure no-one will move, the duo ran off the stage, leaped onto their prepared bicycles and began chasing the carriage.

===== Hamlet without Hamlet =====
Cimrman often had to cope with insufficient ensemble or with sudden getaways of his actors. Therefore, he sometimes had to make substantial adjustments to the plays he wanted to perform, for example he reduced the number of Chekhov's Three Sisters to just one, or he presented Ali Baba and the Forty Thieves as "Ali Baba the Loner". As his masterpiece in this field is considered his "Hamlet without Hamlet", where some other characters onstage (King Claudius, Queen Gertrude) constantly complain that "Hamlet hid himself once again" and they merely use Hamlet's quotations as they presume what he would say if he had been there. However, this version of Hamlet usually did not meet with favour from the audience, and the ensemble had to employ the abovementioned "Vichr z hor" to safely leave the scene.

===== Cimrman's Ten Commandments for Novice Actors =====
Cimrman's theatrical company (called Lipany) had a significant share of untalented and inexperienced actors. In the lecture preceding the play The Stand-In (Czech: Záskok), a list of Cimrman's "Ten Commandments for Novice Actors" is presented, after which the commandments are broken one by one throughout the rest of the play.

- 1. Do not drink for courage. Even the part of a drunkard is better played sober.
- 2. Remember that on the stage you generally have a different name than in real life. It is good to know the names of the other characters also.
- 3. It is best to express strong emotions with your back to the audience. You can best portray both laughter and tears by shrugging your shoulders.
- 4. Do not thank the audience for objects thrown on the stage.
- 5. After a cue, do not repeat everything. Some lines are for other actors.
- 6. Go to the bathroom before the performance so that you do not slouch during the play.
- 7. If you play a devil, remember before sitting down that you have a tail.
- 8. During applause on an open stage, do not bow. It is most likely for someone else.
- 9. Remember that some doors are just painted.
- 10. Do not eat during meals on the stage. Everything is rubber.

In another version, the 7th command is omitted and another command is listed as the last one:

- 10. During the final applause, make bows deep enough for the audience not to notice it is you who shouts "Bravo!"

== Tribute ==
On September 16, 2016, Google celebrated the 50th anniversary of the first play with Jára Cimrman with a Google Doodle. A subspecies of field mouse from the Czech Republic was named Apodemus microps cimrmani in honor of Cimrman. A species of Coccidia in Yemen chameleon was named "Isospora jaracimrmani" in honor of Cimrman.

== See also ==
- The Good Soldier Švejk, another great fictional Czech
- 7796 Járacimrman
- Jára Cimrman Lying, Sleeping
