= Kolya (film) =

1996 Czech film by Jan Svěrák

- Film poster
- Directed by: Jan Svěrák
- Written by: Zdeněk Svěrák
- Produced by: Eric Abraham; Jan Svěrák
- Starring: Zdeněk Svěrák; Andrey Khalimon; Libuše Šafránková
- Cinematography: Vladimír Smutný
- Edited by: Alois Fišárek
- Music by: Ondřej Soukup
- Production companies: Biograf Jan Svěrák; Pandora Cinema; Česká Televize; CinemArt; Portobello Pictures; Space Films
- Distributed by: Space Films (Czech Republic); Miramax Films (International)
- Release date: 15 May 1996 (Czech Republic)
- Running time: 111 minutes (original version); 105 minutes (international version)
- Country: Czech Republic
- Languages: Czech; Slovak; Russian
- Budget: CZK 28 million (app. $1 million)
- Box office: $7.7 million

Kolya (Czech: Kolja) is a 1996 Czech drama film about a man whose life is reshaped in an unexpected way. The film was directed by Jan Svěrák and stars his father, Zdeněk Svěrák, who also wrote the script from a story by Pavel Taussig. Kolya earned critical acclaim and won the Academy Award for Best Foreign Language Film and Golden Globe Award for Best Foreign Language Film.

== Plot ==
The film begins in 1988 in Soviet-occupied Czechoslovakia. František Louka, a middle-aged man dedicated to bachelorhood and the pursuit of women, is a concert cellist struggling to eke out a living by playing funerals at the Prague crematoriums. He has lost his previous job at the Czech Philharmonic, having been blacklisted as "politically unreliable" by the authorities. A friend offers him a chance to earn a great deal of money through a sham marriage to a Soviet woman to enable her to stay in Czechoslovakia. The woman then uses her new citizenship to emigrate to West Germany, where her boyfriend lives.

Due to a concurrence of circumstances, she has to leave behind her 5-year-old son, Kolya, for the disgruntled Czech musician to look after. At first, Louka and Kolya have communication difficulties, as they don't speak each other's languages and the many false friend words that exist in Czech and Russian add to the confusion. Gradually, though, a bond forms between Louka and Kolya. The child suffers from suspected meningitis and has to be placed on a course of carefully monitored antibiotics. Louka is threatened with imprisonment for his suspect marriage, and the child may be placed in a Soviet children's home. The Velvet Revolution intervenes, though, and Kolya is reunited with his mother. Louka and Kolya say their goodbyes.

Louka returns to the Czech Philharmonic and plays Má Vlast with the orchestra under the conductor Rafael Kubelík at the Old Town Square in 1990, while his pregnant girlfriend Klára watches from the crowd.

== Cast ==
- Andrey Khalimon as Kolya
- Zdeněk Svěrák as František Louka
- Libuše Šafránková as Klára
- Ondřej Vetchý as Mr. Brož
- Stella Zázvorková as Louka's mother
- Lillian Malkina as Tamara
- Irina Bezrukova as Kolya's mother
- Ladislav Smoljak as Houdek
- Karel Heřmánek as Musil
- Petra Špalková as Paša
- René Přibyl as Pokorný
- Miroslav Táborský as Novotný
- Slávka Budínová as Buštíková
- Jiří Sovák as Růžička

== Home media ==
The film was released on DVD and VHS on 2 July 2002.

== Reception ==
The film gained positive reviews. It received Honorable Mention at 53rd Venice International Film Festival. On review aggregator Rotten Tomatoes, the film holds an approval rating of 96% based on 25 reviews, with an average score of 7.90/10.

=== Box office ===
In the Czech Republic, the movie's country of origin, over 1.34 million visitors made the movie one of the most successful movies ever. In Germany more than 624,000 tickets were sold for the film.

The film was successful on a limited release in the United States from 24 January 1997 and had taken about $5.73 million by 11 July that year after an opening weekend gross on three screens of $37,795.

== Awards ==
- Academy Award for Best Foreign Language Film
- Golden Globe Award for Best Foreign Language Film
- Czech Lion
  - Best Film
  - Best Director (Jan Svěrák)
  - Best Actress (Libuše Šafránková)
  - Best Supporting Actor (Andrey Khalimon)
  - Best Screenplay (Zdeněk Svěrák)
  - Best Editing (Alois Fišárek)
- Tokyo Sakura Grand Prix

== See also ==
- List of submissions to the 69th Academy Awards for Best Foreign Language Film
- List of Czech submissions for the Academy Award for Best Foreign Language Film
