= Ladislav Smoljak =

Czech director, actor and screenwriter (1931–2010)

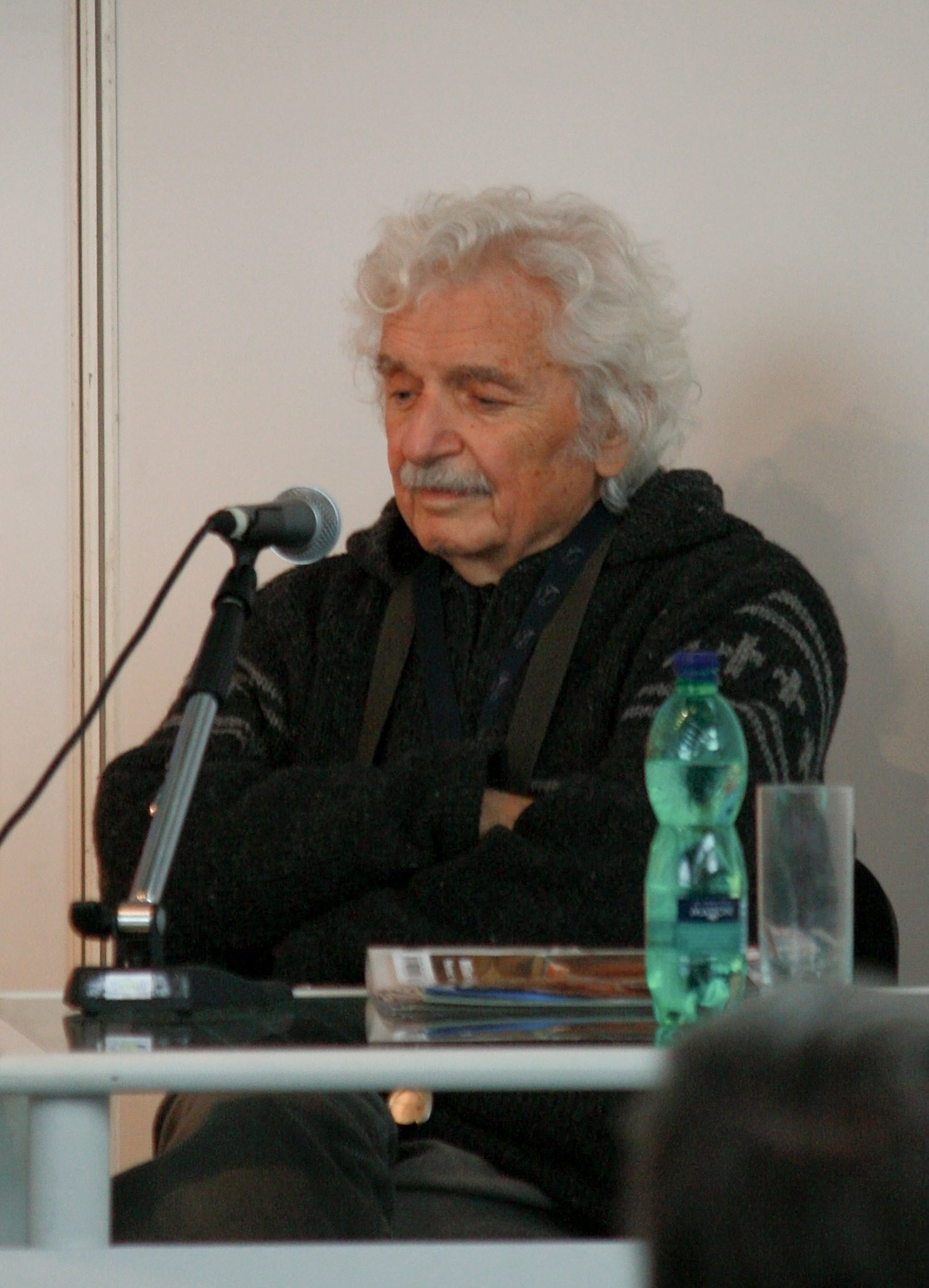
- Smoljak in 2010
- Born: 9 December 1931; Prague, Czechoslovakia
- Died: 6 June 2010 (aged 78); Kladno, Czech Republic
- Occupations: Actor, director, screenwriter
- Years active: 1966–2010

Ladislav Smoljak (9 December 1931 – 6 June 2010) was a Czech film and theatre director, actor and screenwriter.

== Biography ==
Smoljak was born in Prague. He tried to study at an art academy but failed the admission process. He went on to study physics and mathematics, and later worked as a journalist and scriptwriter. Together with Zdeněk Svěrák he founded the Theatre of Jára Cimrman (Divadlo Járy Cimrmana, DJC) in Prague, named after the fictitious genius Jára Cimrman. Smoljak wrote scripts and directed several films; these became very successful in the Czech Republic.

He died of cancer on 6 June 2010 in Kladno.

== Filmography ==
=== Screenplay ===
- 1974 Jáchyme, hoď ho do stroje! (with Zdeněk Svěrák and Oldřich Lipský)
- 1976 Marečku, podejte mi pero! (with Zdeněk Svěrák)
- 1976 Na samotě u lesa (with Zdeněk Svěrák)
- 1978 Ball Lightning (with Zdeněk Svěrák and Zdeněk Podskalský)
- 1980 Trhák (with Zdeněk Svěrák)
- 1983 Jára Cimrman ležící, spící (with Zdeněk Svěrák)
- 1984 Rozpuštěný a vypuštěný (with Zdeněk Svěrák)
- 1987 Nejistá sezóna (with Zdeněk Svěrák)

=== Director ===
- 1978 Ball Lightning (with Zdeněk Podskalský)
- 1981 Vrchní, prchni!
- 1983 Jára Cimrman ležící, spící
- 1984 Rozpuštěný a vypuštěný
- 1987 Nejistá sezóna
- 1990 Tvrdý chleba – TV film
- 1990 Motýl na anténě – TV film
- 1992 Osvětová přednáška v Suché Vrbici – TV film
- 1992 Ať ten kůň mlčí! – TV film
- 1996 Dvě z policejní brašny – TV film

== Honours ==
- Medal of Merit (1999)
