= Zdeněk Svěrák =

Czech actor (born 1936)

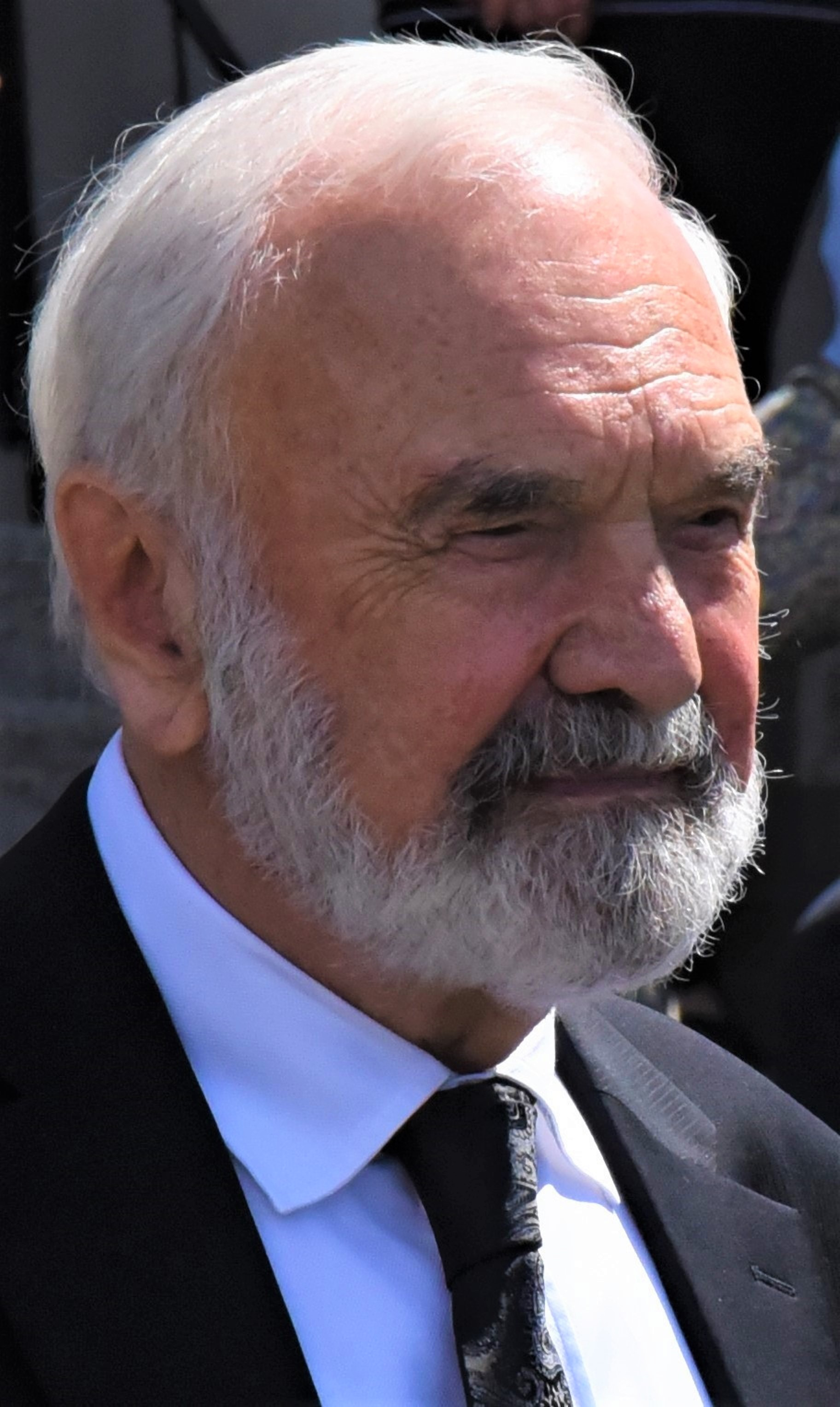
- Svěrák in 2022
- Born: 28 March 1936 (age 90); Prague, Czechoslovakia
- Occupation: Actor
- Years active: 1968–present

Zdeněk Svěrák (born 28 March 1936) is a Czech actor, humorist, playwright and screenwriter. He is one of the most well-known and popular Czech cultural personalities. Since 1968 he has appeared in 32 films.

== Career ==
In 1958, he graduated in Czech language and literature from the Faculty of Education of Charles University in Prague. His work consists of more than 300 musical texts and plays, and he has appeared in 32 feature films. Among his film scripts are the Academy Award-winning Kolya and The Elementary School, both directed by his son Jan Svěrák as well as My Sweet Little Village. With his close friend Ladislav Smoljak and their radio colleague Jiří Šebánek, he created the fictional polymath Jára Cimrman for the radio programme Vinárna U pavouka in 1966. Cimrman was voted The Greatest Czech in 2005, but barred from winning because of being a fictional character. Zdeněk Svěrák also founded a charity organization, Centrum Paraple, which focuses on helping paralyzed individuals.

Svěrák has won three Magnesia Litera awards for his writing. In 2004 he won the Readers' Choice award for his book Jaké je to asi v čudu. He went on to win the same award in 2012 for the book Nové povídky. His third Readers' Choice award came in 2014 for Po strništi bos. In 1989, he was a member of the jury at the 39th Berlin International Film Festival.

== Filmography ==
=== Acting ===
Year	Title	Role	English title
2017	Po strništi bos	The headmaster	Barefoot
2010	Kuky se vrací	Captain von Hergot (voice)	Kooky
2007	Vratné lahve	Josef Tkaloun	Empties
1996	Kolja	František Louka	Kolya
1994	Akumulátor 1	Fišárek: a natural healer	Accumulator 1
1991	Obecná škola	Fanouš Souček, Eda's father	The Elementary School
1988	Nejistá sezóna	Rybník	An Uncertain Season
1986	Rohy	Narrator	The Horns
1985	Jak básníci přicházejí o iluze	Doc. Zajíc	How Poets Are Losing Their Illusions
1985	Jako jed	Pavel Hnyk	As Good as Poison
1985	Vesničko má středisková	Ryba	My Sweet Little Village
1984	Tři veteráni	Minister	Three Veterans
1984	Co je vám, doktore?	Bohouš Burda	What's Up Doc?
1984	Rozpuštěný a vypuštěný	Jelinek	Dissolved and Effused
1984	Slavnosti sněženek	Trabi Driver	The Snowdrop Festival
1983	Jára Cimrman ležící, spící (as Zdeněk Svěrák and Collective)	Jára da Cimrman	Jára Cimrman Lying, Sleeping
1982	Jako zajíci	Dušek	Like Rabbits
1982	Srdečný pozdrav ze zeměkoule	scientist who looks for prof. Cimrman	Hearty greetings from Earth
1981	Kalamita	Teacher	Calamity
1981	V podstatě jsme normální		
1980	Brontosaurus	Bobr	
1980	Trhák	Screenwriter Jíša	The Hit
1980	Vrchní, prchni!	Pařízek	Waiter, Scarper!
1979	Kam nikdo nesmí		Where nobody can enter
1978	Kulový blesk	Dr. Ječný	Ball Lightning
1977	30 panen a Pythagoras	Teacher	Thirty maidens and Pythagoras
1976	Marečku, podejte mi pero!	Šlajs	Marecek, Pass Me the Pen!
1976	Na samotě u lesa	Oldřich Lavička	Seclusion Near a Forest
1974	Jáchyme, hoď ho do stroje!	Klasek	Joachim, Put It in the Machine
1970	Lucie a zázraky		Lucie and the Miracles
1970	Pane, vy jste vdova!	Critic	You Are a Widow, Sir
1969	Skřivánci na niti (as Václav Svěrák)	Delegate URO	Larks on a String
1968	Zločin v šantánu	Procurator	Crime in a Music Hall

== Honours ==
- Medal of Merit, III Class (1999)
- Order of the White Lion, II Class (2025)
