= List of 2018 films based on actual events =

This is a list of films and miniseries released in 2018 that are based on actual events. All films on this list are from American production unless indicated otherwise.

== 2018 ==
- 3 Days in Quiberon (German: v3 Tage in Quiberon) (2018) – German-Austrian-French drama film focusing on three days during the last year of Romy Schneider's life
- 12 Strong (2018) – action war drama film based on the story of U.S. 5th Special Forces Group who were sent to Afghanistan immediately after the September 11 attacks and up to the fall of Mazar-i-Sharif
- The 15:17 to Paris (2018) – biographical drama film following Spencer Stone, Anthony Sadler, and Alek Skarlatos through life leading up to and including their stopping of the 2015 Thalys train attack
- 22 July (2018) – crime drama film about the 2011 Norway attacks and their aftermath
- 27 Guns (2018) – Ugandan action adventure biographical film about Yoweri Museveni and his military colleagues during the Ugandan Bush War
- A Futile and Stupid Gesture (2018) – biographical comedy drama film about comedy writer Douglas Kenny, during the rise and fall of National Lampoon
- A Private War (2018) – biographical war drama film about Marie Colvin, an American journalist for The Sunday Times, visiting the most dangerous countries and documenting their civil wars
- A Son of Man (Spanish: Un hijo de hombre) (2018) – Ecuadorian adventure film based in part on the story of director Luis Felipe Fernández-Salvador's father, who spent most of his life searching for the lost treasure of Atahualpa, the last emperor of the Incas
- A Translator (Spanish: Un Traductor) (2018) – Cuban biographical drama film depicting how a local Russian literature professor is ordered to act as a translator when survivors of the Chernobyl disaster arrive in Cuba for medical treatment
- A Twelve-Year Night (Spanish: La noche de 12 años) (2018) – Spanish-Uruguayan drama film following the twelve-year incarceration of members of the Tupamaros, a far-left urban guerrilla group active in the 1960s and 1970s, nine of whom were held as "hostages" between 1972 and 1985
- A Very English Scandal (2018) – British historical drama miniseries depicting a dramatisation of the 1976–1979 Thorpe affair and more than 15 years of events leading up to it
- Aami (Malayalam: ആമി) (2018) – Indian Malayalam-language biographical film based on the life of poet-author Kamala Das
- Acute Misfortune (2018) – Australian drama film based on Sydney journalist Erik Jensen's biography of Australian artist Adam Cullen, who died at the age of 46
- Adrift (2018) – American-Icelandic survival drama film based on a true story set during the events of Hurricane Raymond in 1983
- All About Me (German: Der Junge muss an die frische Luft) (2018) – German biographical film about the early life of Hape Kerkeling
- All Is True (2018) – British historical drama film taking a look at the final days in the life of renowned playwright William Shakespeare
- American Animals (2018) – British-American Heist film based on the story of an actual heist which took place at Transylvania University in Lexington, Kentucky in 2004.
- The Angel (2018) – Egyptian-Israeli-British spy thriller film based on Ashraf Marwan, a high-ranking Egyptian official who became a double agent for both countries and helped achieve peace between the two
- Another Day of Life (Polish: Jeszcze dzień życia) (2018) – Polish animated drama film depicting a record of three months of the Angolan Civil War by the Polish writer Ryszard Kapuściński
- The Assassination of Gianni Versace: American Crime Story (2018) – crime drama miniseries examining the July 1997 murder of legendary fashion designer Gianni Versace by sociopathic serial killer Andrew Cunanan
- At Eternity's Gate (2018) – French-British biographical drama film about the final years of painter Vincent van Gogh's life
- Backstabbing for Beginners (2018) – Canada-Danish-American political thriller film following the real life corruption scandal in the UN Oil-for-Food Programme
- Balloon (German: Ballon) (2018) – German thriller drama film depicting the crossing of the Inner German border by the Strelzyk and Wetzel families from the GDR to West Germany with a self-made hot-air balloon in 1979
- Beautiful Boy (2018) – biographical drama film based on a father-son relationship increasingly strained by the latter's drug addiction based on memoirs by David Sheff and Nic Sheff
- Beautifully Broken (2018) – religious biographical drama film based on the real-life experiences of multiple families from different countries who were connected through their shared struggles and found healing through helping one another, inspired by the Rwandan Genocide
- Becoming Astrid (Swedish: Unga Astrid, Danish: Unge Astrid) (2018) – Swedish-Danish biographical drama film about the early life of Swedish author Astrid Lindgren
- Believe Me: The Abduction of Lisa McVey (2018) – Canadian-American crime drama film recounting the true story of Lisa McVey who was abducted and raped for 26 hours by serial killer Bobby Joe Long in 1984
- Bigger (2018) – comedy drama film about the life of real life bodybuilders Joe and Ben Weider
- Billionaire Boys Club (2018) – biographical crime drama film based on the real-life Billionaire Boys Club from Southern California during the 1980s, a group of rich teenagers who got involved in a Ponzi scheme and, eventually, murder
- Bimba Devi Alias Yashodhara (Sinhala: බිම්බා දේවී හෙවත් යශෝධරා) (2018) – Sri Lankan epic biographical drama film depicting the life of princess Yashodhara, the wife of Prince Siddhartha
- Birds of Passage (Spanish: Pájaros de verano) (2018) – Colombian-Mexican epic crime film exploring the rise of a Wayuu man and his family as they enter the drug trade, prosper, and slowly lose their traditions and former way of life, based on real stories the writers heard during this research phase of production
- BlacKkKlansman (2018) – biographical crime comedy drama film following Ron Stallworth, the first African-American detective in the [[Colorado Springs Police Department|city's police department]] as he sets out to infiltrate and expose the local Ku Klux Klan chapter
- Blaze (2018) – biographical drama film based on the life of country musician Blaze Foley
- Bohemian Rhapsody (2018) – British-American biographical musical drama film depicting the story of the life of Freddie Mercury, the lead singer of the British rock band Queen, from the formation of the band in 1970 up to their 1985 Live Aid performance at the original Wembley Stadium
- Boy Erased (2018) – biographical drama film based on the story of Garrard Conley, the son of Baptist parents, who was forced to take part in a gay conversion therapy program
- Brian Banks (2018) – biographical drama film about Brian Banks, a high school football linebacker who was falsely accused of rape and upon his release attempted to fulfil his dream of making the National Football League
- Buñuel in the Labyrinth of the Turtles (2018) – Spanish animated biographical drama about film director Luis Buñuel making the 1933 film Land Without Bread
- Burden (2018) – biographical drama film based on the story of Mike Burden, an orphan raised within the Ku Klux Klan who attempts to break away when the woman he falls in love with urges him to leave for a better life together, inspired by true events
- By the Grace of God (French: Grâce à Dieu) (2018) – French-Belgian drama film about three victims of a Catholic priest's abuse, who are set to expose the sexual abuse hidden by the Catholic Church
- Can You Ever Forgive Me? (2018) – biographical drama film based on the story of Lee Israel and her attempts to revitalize her failing writing career by forging letters from deceased authors and playwrights
- The Catcher was a Spy (2018) – war drama film about Moe Berg, a former baseball player who joined the war effort during World War II and participated in espionage for the U.S. Government
- Chalakkudikkaran Changathi (Malayalam: ചാലക്കുടിക്കാരൻ ചങ്ങാതി) (2018) – Indian Malayalam-language biographical drama film inspired by the life story of Kalabhavan Mani
- Charlie Says (2018) – biographical drama film telling the story of Leslie "Lulu" Van Houten's life in the Manson Family cult and Karlene Faith's work to deprogram her after her involvement in the Tate and LaBianca murders
- City of Lies (2018) – crime thriller film about the investigations by the Los Angeles Police Department of the murders of rappers Tupac Shakur and The Notorious B.I.G.
- Cocaine Coast (Galician: Fariña) (2018) – Spanish crime drama miniseries about Sito Miñanco, a fisherman who is skilled in speedboat handling, who started to work in a tobacco smuggling ring led by Vicente Otero Pérez "Terito", the head of the Galician clans of the Ría de Arousa
- Cold War (Polish: Zimna wojna) (2018) – Polish-French-British historical drama film loosely inspired by the lives of Paweł Pawlikowski's parents
- Colette (2018) – British-American-Hungarian biographical drama film based upon the life of French novelist Colette
- Come Sunday (2018) – biographical drama film about Carlton Pearson, an evangelist minister who was ostracized by his church and excommunicated for preaching that there is no Hell
- Congo (Norwegian: Mordene i Kongo) (2018) – Norwegian crime drama film revolving around two Norwegian adventurers, Joshua French and Tjostolv Moland, who are accused of killing their hired chauffeur just before crossing into the eastern part of the Democratic Republic of Congo
- Curtiz (2018) – Hungarian biographical film based on the making of the 1942 Humphrey Bogart film Casablanca by Hungarian director Michael Curtiz
- Diary of My Mind (French: Journal de ma tête) (2018) – Swiss true crime television film about a school teacher who must confront the effects of having been made an unwitting accomplice to a murder
- Dogman (2018) – Italian crime drama film about a timid dog groomer living in a poor suburb sells cocaine on the side based on a true story
- Don't Worry, He Won't Get Far on Foot (2018) – comedy drama film following a recently paralyzed alcoholic who finds a passion for drawing off-color newspaper cartoons, based upon the memoir of the same name by John Callahan
- Dovlatov (Russian: Довлатов) (2018) – Russian biographical film about the writer Sergei Dovlatov
- The Drug King (Korean: 마약왕) (2018) – South Korean crime drama film depicting the true life story of Lee Doo-sam, a drug smuggler building his empire in Busan's crime underworld in the 1970s
- Dukla 61 (2018) – Czech disaster drama film about the 1961 mining disaster at Dukla Mine in Dolní Suchá killed 108 miners
- El Angel (2018) – Argentine-Spanish crime drama film about the life and crimes of Carlos Eduardo Robledo Puch
- El Potro: Unstoppable (Spanish: El Potro, lo mejor del amor) (2018) – Argentine biographical drama film telling the story of the rise as a cuarteto singer Rodrigo “El Potro” Bueno, who becomes an Argentinian cuarteto star, but dies in a car accident in 2000
- Ekvtime: Man of God (Georgian: ექვთიმე ღვთისკაცი) (2018) – Georgian historical drama film about Ekvtime Takaishvili
- Entebbe (2018) – British-American action thriller film that tells about the story of Operation Entebbe, a 1976 counter-terrorist hostage-rescue operation
- Escape at Dannemora (2018) – thriller drama miniseries based on the 2015 Clinton Correctional Facility escape
- Eternal Winter (Hungarian: Örök tél) (2018) – Hungarian drama film about the program of forced labor of Hungarians in the Soviet Union in the aftermath of World War II
- The Favourite (2018) – Irish-British-American satirical historical black comedy film examining the relationship between two cousins, Sarah, Duchess of Marlborough and Abigail Masham, who are vying to be Court favourites of Queen Anne
- First Man (2018) – biographical drama film exploring the years leading up to the Apollo 11 mission to the Moon in 1969
- First Name: Mathieu (French: Prénom: Mathieu) (2018) – Swiss true crime television film based on the real life case of serial killer Michel Peiry
- The Front Runner (2018) – political drama film chronicling the rise of American senator Gary Hart, a candidate to be the 1988 Democratic presidential nominee, and his subsequent fall from grace when media reports suggested he was having an extramarital affair
- Girl in the Bunker (2018) – crime drama television film depicting the kidnapping of 14-year-old Elizabeth Shoaf
- Gold (Hindi: सोना) (2018) – Indian Hindi-language historical sports drama film based on the journey of India's first national hockey team to the 1948 Summer Olympics
- Golden Sting (Czech: Zlatý podraz) (2018) – Czech sport romantic drama film telling the true story of the Czechoslovak national basketball team during the historically tumultuous period of 1938 to 1951
- Gosnell: The Trial of America's Biggest Serial Killer (2018) – legal drama film about Kermit Gosnell, a physician and abortion provider who was convicted of first degree murder in the deaths of three infants born alive, involuntary manslaughter in the death of a patient undergoing an abortion procedure, 21 felony counts of illegal late-term abortion, and 211 counts of violating a 24-hour informed consent law
- Gotti (2018) – biographical crime film about New York City mobster John Gotti
- Goyo: The Boy General (Filipino: Goyo: Ang Batang Heneral) (2018) – Philippine historical epic film about Gregorio del Pilar, who died during the historic Battle of Tirad Pass in the Philippine–American War
- The Great Battle (Korean: 안시성) (2018) – South Korean epic historical action film about the siege of Ansi Fortress in 645 CE and the epic eighty-eight day battle that Yang Manchun and his Goguryeo troops fought against invading Tang forces
- Green Book (2018) – biographical comedy drama film inspired by the true story of a tour of the Deep South by African American classical and jazz pianist Don Shirley and Italian American bouncer Frank "Tony Lip" Vallelonga, who served as Shirley's driver and bodyguard
- The Grizzlies (2018) – Canadian sports drama film depicting a youth lacrosse team that was set up to help combat an onslaught of youth suicide in the community of Kugluktuk, Nunavut - based on a true story
- Gundermann (2018) – German musical biographical film based on the life of East German singer-songwriter Gerhard Gundermann
- The Happy Prince (2018) – Belgian-Italian-British biographical drama film about Oscar Wilde
- Harassment (Portuguese: Assédio) (2018) – Brazilian legal drama miniseries about the former Brazilian physician Roger Abdelmassih
- Harry & Meghan: A Royal Romance (2018) – romantic drama television film about the meeting and courtship of Prince Harry and Meghan Markle
- Hotel Mumbai (2018) – Australian-American-Indian action thriller film about the 2008 Mumbai attacks at the Taj Mahal Palace Hotel in India
- Hürkuş: Göklerdeki Kahraman (2018) – Turkish biographical drama film about the life of Vecihi Hürkuş, one of the most important figures in Turkish aviation history
- Hurricane (Polish: 303: Bitwa o Anglię) (2018) – Polish-British biographical war drama film depicting the experiences of a group of Polish pilots of No. 303 Squadron RAF (Dywizjon 303) in the Battle of Britain in the Second World War
- I Can Only Imagine (2018) – religious biographical drama film based on the story behind the group MercyMe's song of the same name, the best-selling Christian single of all time
- Indivisible (2018) – religious war drama film based on the true story of Darren Turner, a United States Army chaplain who struggles to balance his faith and the Iraq War
- In Like Flynn (2018) – Australian biographical film about the early life of actor Errol Flynn
- Jacqueline Comes Home (2018) – Philippine biographical crime film about the controversial Chiong murder case
- Jan Palach (2018) – Czech biographical drama film following Jan Palach during 1968 and 1969 and shows the final 6 months of his life
- JT LeRoy (2018) – Canadian-American-British biographical drama film about Savannah Knoop who spends six years masquerading as writer Laura Albert's literary persona JT LeRoy
- Kalu Hima (Sinhala: කළු හිම) (2018) – Sri Lankan drama thriller film based on avalanche and flash flood surged down the Seti river (Annapurna IV) in Nepal on May 5, 2012
- Kayamkulam Kochunni (Malayalam: കായംകുളം കൊച്ചുണ്ണി) (2018) – Indian Malayalam-language historical action film based on the life of Kayamkulam Kochunni, a famed highwayman who robbed from the rich and gave to the poor during the British Raj in the early 19th century Central Travancore
- The Keeper (2018) – British-German biographical drama film telling the love story of a young English woman and Bert Trautmann, who together overcome prejudice, public hostility and personal tragedy
- Killed by My Debt (2018) – British drama television film based on the life of Jerome Rogers who died by suicide aged twenty having accrued debts of over £1,000 stemming from two unpaid £65 traffic fines
- King of Thieves (2018) - British heist film based on the Hatton Garden safe deposit burglary of 2015
- King Petar the First (Serbian: Краљ Петар I) (2018) – Serbian-Greek historical war drama film about Peter I of Serbia
- Knife+Heart (French: Un couteau dans le cœur) (2018) – French horror thriller film loosely based on Anne-Marie Tensi, a female producer specialized in gay pornography who was active in France in the 1970s and 1980s
- Kursk (2018) – Belgian-French-Luxembourg disaster drama thriller film depicting the true story of the 2000 Kursk submarine disaster
- La Bolduc (2018) – Canadian French-language biographical drama film about Quebec folk singer La Bolduc
- Le Mans 1955 (2018) – French animated disaster short film inspired by the 1955 Le Mans disaster
- Lee Chong Wei (2018) – Malaysian biographical sports drama film about the story of national icon Lee Chong Wei, who rose from poverty to become the top badminton player in the world
- Let Me Fall (Icelandic: Lof mér að falla) (2018) – Icelandic drama film portraying a harrowing portrait of addiction, based on true stories and interviews with the families of addicts
- Leto (Russian: Лето) (2018) – Russian musical drama film depicting the Leningrad underground rock scene of the early 1980s, drawing loosely from the lives of the Soviet rock musicians Viktor Tsoi and Mike Naumenko
- Lizzie (2018) – historical biographical thriller film based on the true story of Lizzie Borden, who was accused and acquitted of the axe murders of her father and stepmother in Fall River, Massachusetts, in 1892
- The Looming Tower (2018) – drama miniseries tracing the "rising threat of Osama bin Laden and al-Qaeda in the late 1990s and how the rivalry between the FBI and CIA during that time may have inadvertently set the path for the tragedy of 9/11
- Lords of Chaos (2018) – British-Swedish-American biographical thriller film depicting an account of the early 1990s Norwegian black metal scene told from the perspective of Mayhem co-founder Euronymous
- Loro (2018) – Italian drama film about media tycoon and politician Silvio Berlusconi
- M (2018) – Finnish experimental drama film inspired by the last days of Marilyn Monroe
- The Maestro (2018) – historical drama film about composer Mario Castelnuovo-Tedesco, an Italian immigrant who arrived in Los Angeles in the thirties after evading Mussolini's Italy
- Mahanati (Telugu: మహానటి) (2018) – Indian Telugu-language biographical drama film based on the life of Indian actress Savitri
- Manto (Hindi: मंटो) (2018) – Indian Hindi-language biographical drama film based on the life of the prominent Urdu author Saadat Hasan Manto
- Mapplethorpe (2018) – biographical drama film about the life of photographer Robert Mapplethorpe
- Mary Magdalene (2018) – religious drama film about the woman of the same name
- Mary Queen of Scots (2018) – historical drama film about Mary, Queen of Scots and her cousin Queen Elizabeth I and chronicling the 1569 conflict between their two countries
- May the Lord Be with Us (Czech: Bůh s námi - od defenestrace k Bílé hoře) (2018) – Czech historical drama television film set during Bohemian Revolt that triggered Thirty Years' War
- Methanol (Czech: Metanol) (2018) – Czech disaster drama television film focusing on the 2012 Czech Republic methanol poisonings
- Mihkel (Icelandic: Undir Halastjörnu) (2018) – Icelandic crime drama film based on true events from a 2004 criminal case in Iceland where a body was discovered by a chance by a diver in the Neskaupstaður harbor
- The Miracle Season (2018) – biographical sports drama film based on the true story of the Iowa City West High School volleyball team after the sudden death of the team's heart and leader, Caroline Found, in 2011
- Miss Dalí (2018) - biographical drama film centering on the relationship between Anna Maria Dalí and her older brother, famous surrealist Salvador Dalí
- The Most Assassinated Woman in the World (French: La femme la plus assassinée du monde) (2018) – French mystery thriller film loosely inspired by the work and life of French actress Paula Maxa
- Motorcycle Girl (2018) – Pakistani biographical adventure film based on the life of motorcyclist Zenith Irfan
- Mrs Wilson (2018) – British historical drama miniseries about a widow who uncovers a mysterious and secret life following the death of her husband based on Ruth Wilson's real-life grandmother
- The Mule (2018) – crime drama film which recounts the story of Leo Sharp, a World War II veteran who became a drug courier for the Sinaloa Cartel in his 80s
- Mulk (Hindi: मुल्क) (2018) – Indian Hindi-language legal drama film centring around the life of a Muslim family, who tries to reclaim its lost honor after its patriarch gets involved in terrorism, based on a true story
- Murderous Trance (2018) – Danish psychological thriller film based on a true story about the astonishing hypnosis murders that took place in Denmark in the 1950s
- My Dinner with Hervé (2018) – biographical drama television film based on the later days of actor Hervé Villechaize
- No One Would Tell (2018) – crime drama television film based on the true story of Jamie Fuller, a 16-year-old high school student who murdered his 14-year-old girlfriend
- The Old Man & the Gun (2018) – biographical crime film about Forrest Tucker, a career criminal and escape artist
- Olivia Newton-John: Hopelessly Devoted to You (2018) – Australian biographical drama miniseries based on the Australian singer/songwriter and actress Olivia Newton-John
- On My Skin (Italian: Sulla mia pelle) (2018) – Italian biographical drama film based on the real story of the last days of Stefano Cucchi, a 31-year-old building surveyor who died in 2009 during preventive custody, victim of police brutality
- On the Basis of Sex (2018) – biographical legal drama film based on the life and early cases of Supreme Court Justice Ruth Bader Ginsburg, who served as an Associate Justice of the United States Supreme Court from 1993 to her death in 2020, and became the second woman to serve on the Supreme Court
- One Nation, One King (French: Un peuple et son roi) (2018) – French historical drama film showing the French Revolution in Paris from the storming of the Bastille to the execution of the King
- Operation Finale (2018) – historical drama film about a 1960 clandestine operation by Israeli commandos to capture former SS officer Adolf Eichmann, and transport him to Jerusalem for trial on charges of crimes against humanity
- Operation Red Sea (Mandarin: 紅海行動) (2018) – Chinese action war film loosely based on the evacuation of foreign nationals and almost 600 Chinese citizens from Yemen's southern port of Aden during late March in 2015 Yemeni Civil War
- Outlaw King (2018) – British-American historical action drama film about 14th-century Scottish king Robert the Bruce during the Scottish Wars of Independence
- Parmanu: The Story of Pokhran (Hindi: परमाणु) (2018) – Indian Hindi-language historical action drama film based on the nuclear bomb test explosions conducted by the Indian Army at Pokhran in 1998
- PASKAL: The Movie (2018) – Malaysian action thriller film inspired by the elite Royal Malaysian Navy (RMN) force named PASKAL
- Paterno (2018) – thriller drama television film about former Penn State football coach Joe Paterno, and his career leading up to his dismissal following the university's child sex abuse scandal in 2011
- Paul, Apostle of Christ (2018) – religious drama film telling the story of Paul the Apostle, who was known as a ruthless persecutor of Christians prior to his conversion to Christianity
- Peterloo (2018) – British historical drama film based on the Peterloo Massacre of 1819
- The Photographer of Mauthausen (Spanish: El fotógrafo de Mauthausen) (2018) – Spanish historical biographical drama film telling the history of the photographer Francisco Boix during his life in the Mauthausen-Gusen concentration camp complex
- Pulang (2018) – Malaysian adventure drama film about a man from a village who sails around the world hoping for riches as his wife waits for his promised return for 61 years, based on a true story
- Quezon's Game (2018) – Philippine biographical drama film centring on Philippine President Manuel L. Quezon and his plan to shelter German and Austrian Jews in the Philippines who were fleeing Nazi Germany during the pre-World War II era
- Raazi (Hindi: राज़ी) (2018) – Indian Hindi-language spy thriller film depicting a true account of an Indian Research and Analysis Wing (RAW) agent who, upon her father's request, is married into a family of military officers in Pakistan to relay information to India, prior to the Indo-Pakistani War of 1971
- Radium Girls (2018) – historical drama film telling the true story of the Radium Girls in the 1910s and 1920s
- Raid (Hindi: छापा) (2018) – Indian Hindi-language crime drama film based on the real life income-tax raid conducted by the officers of Income Tax Department on Sardar Inder Singh in the 1980s, which distinguished itself from others for being the longest raid in Indian history
- Red Joan (2018) – British spy drama film inspired by the life of Melita Norwood who worked at the British Non-Ferrous Metals Research Association as a secretary and supplied the Soviet Union with nuclear secrets
- Redbad (2018) – Dutch historical drama film based on the life of Radbod, an early medieval Frisian leader
- The Resistance Banker (Dutch: Bankier van het Verzet) (2018) – Dutch historical war drama film based on the life of banker Walraven van Hall who financed the Dutch resistance during the war
- Riot (2018) – Australian drama television film about the LGBTI rights movement in the 1970s and the beginnings of the Sydney Gay and Lesbian Mardi Gras
- Saint Judy (2018) – biographical drama film about Judy Wood, an immigration attorney who changed the law on granting asylum in the United States to save the lives of women
- Sajjan Singh Rangroot (2018) – Indian Punjabi-language war drama film based on the experiences of Sikh soldiers of the British Indian Army fighting on the Western Front during World War I
- Sanju (Hindi: संजू) (2018) – Indian Hindi-language biographical comedy drama film depicting the life of Bollywood actor Sanjay Dutt, his addiction with drugs, arrest for his association with the 1993 Bombay bombings, relationship with his father, comeback in the industry, the eventual drop of charges from the Bombay bombings, and release after completing his jail term
- Sirius (2018) – Swiss true crime television film based on the Order of the Solar Temple fires at Salvan in 1994
- The Silent Revolution (German: Das schweigende Klassenzimmer) (2018) - German historical drama film depicting the true story of a high school class in the German Democratic Republic, who have a moment of silence for the victims of the failed Hungarian Revolution of 1956
- Sgt. Stubby: An American Hero (2018) - animated family adventure film centering on the real-life Sergeant Stubby, a stray Boston Terrier
- Skin (2018) – biographical drama film following the life of Bryon Widner, a former member of a Neo-Nazism-influenced skinhead group
- Sobibor (Russian: Собибор) (2018) – Russian war drama film based on the Sobibor revolt which occurred in 1943 in German-occupied Poland
- Solo (2018) – Spanish drama film dramatizing the plight of Álvaro Vizcaíno, a surfer who temporarily disappeared after falling from a cliff in Fuerteventura in 2014
- Soorma (Hindi: सूरमा) (2018) – Indian Hindi-language biographical sports drama film based on the life of and return of hockey player Sandeep Singh
- The Spy Gone North (Korean: 공작) (2018) – South Korean spy drama film based on the true story of Park Chae-seo, a former South Korean agent who infiltrated North Korea's nuclear facilities
- Stan & Ollie (2018) – British-Canadian-American biographical comedy drama film based on the later years of the lives of the comedy double act Laurel and Hardy
- Stockholm (2018) - Canadian-American crime comedy drama film loosely based on the true story of the 1973 bank heist and hostage crisis in Stockholm
- Subedar Joginder Singh (2018) – Indian Punjabi-language war drama based on the life of Joginder Singh, an Indian soldier who was killed in the 1962 Sino-Indian War and posthumously awarded the Param Vir Chakra
- Tag (2018) – comedy film based on the true story that was published in The Wall Street Journal about a group of grown men who spend one month a year playing the game of tag
- The Tale (2018) – drama film telling the story of Jennifer Fox's own child sexual abuse and her coming to terms with it in her later life
- Talks with TGM (Czech: Hovory s TGM) (2018) – Czech historical drama film focusing on the first Czechoslovak president Tomáš Garrigue Masaryk and writer Karel Čapek and their dialogue in 1928
- Tankers (Russian: Несокрушимый) (2018) – Russian war drama film based on the real story of the feat of the crew of a Soviet KV-1 tank under the command of Semyon Konovalov which took part in an unequal battle on 13 July 1942 and destroyed 16 tanks, two armored vehicles and eight other vehicles from enemy forces
- Toman (2018) – Czech historical drama film focusing on Zdeněk Toman, who led Czechoslovak intelligence from 1945 to 1948
- Torvill & Dean (2018) – British biographical sports television film about the early life and careers of Jayne Torvill and Christopher Dean, the Nottinghamshire ice dancers who went on to record a perfect score and win the Olympic gold medal in Sarajevo at the 1984 Winter Olympics
- Traffic Ramasamy (Tamil: டிராஃபிக் ராமசாமி) (2018) – Indian Tamil-language biographical drama film based on the real-life story of the veteran social activist K. R. Ramaswamy who received the nickname of Traffic Ramaswamy for his activism in controlling traffic related issues in Tamil Nadu
- Trial by Fire (2018) – biographical drama film based upon David Grann's article "Trial by Fire" that appeared in The New Yorker in 2009 about case Willingham v. State of Texas
- The Trump Prophecy (2018) – religious drama film about Orlando-based retired firefighter Mark Taylor's experiences in the run up to the 2016 election
- Unbroken: Path to Redemption (2018) – religious drama film chronicling the experiences of Louis Zamperini following his return from World War II, his personal struggles to adjust back to civilian life and his eventual conversion to evangelical Christianity after attending one of Billy Graham's church revivals
- Unsolved (2018) – crime drama miniseries based on the 1996 murder of Tupac Shakur and the 1997 murder of The Notorious B.I.G.
- Utøya: July 22 (2018) – Norwegian crime drama film based on the Utøya summer camp massacre that took place on 22 July 2011
- The Vanishing (2018) – British psychological thriller film based on the 1900 disappearance of the Flannan Isles Lighthouse crew
- Veneno (2018) – sport biographical drama film about the Dominican Republic wrestler Jack Veneno
- Vice (2018) – biographical political satire black comedy film following Dick Cheney on his path to become the most powerful vice president in American history
- Vita and Virginia (2018) – British-Irish biographical romantic drama film based on the love affair between Vita Sackville-West and Virginia Woolf
- Waco (2018) – crime drama thriller miniseries dramatizing the 1993 standoff between the Federal Bureau of Investigation (FBI), the Bureau of Alcohol, Tobacco, Firearms and Explosives (ATF), and the Branch Davidians in Waco, Texas
- Welcome to Marwen (2018) – drama film inspired by the true story of Mark Hogancamp, a man struggling with PTSD who, after being physically assaulted, creates a fictional village to ease his trauma
- White Boy Rick (2018) – biographical crime drama film about Richard Wershe Jr., who in the 1980s became the youngest FBI informant ever at the age of 14
- The White Crow (2018) – British-French-Croatian-Serbian biographical drama film chronicling the life and dance career of ballet dancer Rudolf Nureyev
- Winchester (2018) – Australian-American supernatural horror film based on the life of Sarah Winchester and follows her as she is haunted by spirits inside her San Jose mansion in 1906
- Yuli: The Carlos Acosta Story (2018) – Cuban dance biographical film about the Cuban ballet director and dancer Carlos Acosta
