= 2018 Czech Lion Awards =

Czech film and TV award ceremony

26th Czech Lion Awards
- Date: March 23, 2019
- Site: Rudolfinum, Prague
- Hosted by: Václav Kopta
- Produced by: Marek Najbrt
- Directed by: Michael Čech

Highlights
- Best Picture: Winter Flies
- Best Actor: Karel Dobrý; Hastrman
- Best Actress: Jenovéfa Boková; Moments
- Best Supporting Actor: Jan František Uher; Winter Flies
- Best Supporting Actress: Eliška Křenková; Winter Flies
- Most awards: Winter Flies (6)
- Most nominations: Toman (13)

Television coverage
- Network: Czech Television
- Ratings: 559,000

2018 Czech Lion Awards ceremony was held on 23 March 2019. Nominations were announced on 22 January 2019. Toman has received highest number of nominations. Nominations for television categories were announced on 25 February 2019.

Václav Kopta was announced as host of the ceremony on 6 December 2018. Visual style of the ceremony was presented to public on 6 December 2018. It was created by Dynamo design.

Winter Flies has won highest number of awards including Best film.

== Winners and nominees ==
Best Film	Best Director
Winter Flies; The Golden Betrayal; The Interpreter; Jan Palach; Toman	Olmo Omerzu - Winter Flies; Jan Švankmajer - Insects; Martin Šulík - The Interpreter; Robert Sedláček - Jan Palach; Ondřej Trojan - Toman
Best Actor in a Leading Role	Best Actress in a Leading Role
Karel Dobrý – Hastrman; Martin Huba – Talks with TGM; Viktor Zavadil – Jan Palach; Jiří Macháček – Toman; Tomáš Mrvík – Winter Flies	Jenovéfa Boková – Moments; Simona Zmrzlá – Hastrman; Ivana Chýlková – Bear with Us; Zuzana Bydžovská – Jan Palach; Kateřina Winterová – Toman
Best Actor in a Supporting Role	Best Actress in a Supporting Role
Jan František Uher – Winter Flies; Jan Kolařík – Hastrman; Jiří Lábus – Insects; Jan Vondráček – Jan Palach; Jan Hartl – The Golden Betrayal	Eliška Křenková – Winter Flies; Jana Synková – Bear with Us; Tatiana Vilhelmová – Patrimony; Kristýna Boková – Toman; Lenka Vlasáková – Winter Flies
Best Screenplay	Best Editing
Winter Flies; Bear with Us; The Interpreter; Jan Palach; Toman	Winter Flies; The Golden Betrayal; Hastrman; Insects; Toman
Best Cinematography	Stage Design
Hastrman; The Golden Betrayal; The Interpreter; Toman; Winter Flies	Insects; The Golden Betrayal; Hastrman; The Magic Quill; Toman
Makeup and Hairstyling	Costume Design
The Magic Quill; The Golden Betrayal; Hastrman; Jan Palach; Toman	Hastrman; The Golden Betrayal; Jan Palach; The Magic Quill; Toman
Music	Sound
Hastrman; Domestique; The Golden Betrayal; Toman; Winter Flies	Domestique; The Golden Betrayal; Hastrman; Insects; Toman
Unique Contribution to Czech Film	Best Documentary
Věra Plívová-Šimková	King Skate; When the War Comes; Nothing Like Before; Planeta Česko; The Russian Job
Best Television Film or Miniseries	Best TV Series
Dukla 61; Metanol; Rédl	Dabing Street; Profesor T.; Vzteklina

=== Non-statutory Awards ===
Best Film Poster	Film Fans Award
Toman; Domestique; Insects; Bear with Us; King Skate	Úsměvy smutných mužů
Magnesie Award for Best Student Film
One Hundred and Twenty-Eight Thousand; Sugar and Salt; Home Sleep Home; The Night of the Agama; Apart
