= Cinemart =

Czech film company

Cinemart is a Czech film company founded in 1992 as Lucernafilm. It changed to its current name in 1995. Cinemart was a minor film distributor with only 1% share on the market. It changed when Cinemart took over US partners of Bontonfilm becoming one of largest film distribution companies in the Czech Republic. They are the current distributors for Universal Pictures films in the Czech Republic and Slovakia.

As of 2022 Cinemart holds 34.5% market share being the largest Czech film distributor.

== Films ==
=== Czech ===
Release date	Title	Notes
23 February 2012	The Blue Tiger	
1 November 2012	Yuma	
28 February 2013	Lucky Four Serving the King	
14 March 2013	The Story of Mr. Love	
11 April 2013	My Dog Killer	
16 May 2013	Nazareth until we drop	
29 August 2013	Zuzana Michnová – Just the Right Kind of Famous	
6 November 2013	The Hussites	
5 December 2013	Delight	
21 November 2014	Bella Mia	
1 May 2014	Velvet Divorce	
8 May 2014	Hany	
11 September 2014	Missing 45	
18 September 2014	Places	
23 September 2014	Angels	
20 November 2014	Us 2	
4 December 2014	Hostage	
1 January 2015	Rumbling	
27 August 2015	Climbing Higher	
15 October 2015	The Great Adventures of Rosa and Dora	
17 December 2015	Abandoned Space	
21 January 2016	The Devil's Mistress	
18 February 2016	Family Film	
24 February 2016	The Tree	
25 February 2016	Crazy Kingdom	
31 March 2016	Theory of Tiger	
28 April 2016	In Your Dreams!	
8 September 2016	Green Horse Rustlers	
13 October 2016	Stuck with a Perfect Woman	
10 November 2016	Pojar for Children	
8 March 2017	Let Mišík Sing!	
8 March 2017	Superbia	
20 April 2017	Spoor	
27 April 2017	Garden Store: Family Friend	
4 May 2017	Ministry of Love	
21 July 2017	Satisfaction 1720	
3 August 2017	Little Crusader	
29 August 2017	Harvie and the Magic Museum	
28 September 2017	Garden Store: Deserter	
16 November 2017	Garden Store: Suitor	
6 December 2017	Little Harbour	
4 January 2018	Pure Devilry	
19 February 2018	Insects	
8 March 2018	Patrimony	
19 April 2018	Hastrman	
26 July 2018	Bear with Us	
21 August 2018	Jan Palach	
6 September 2018	Winter Flies	
20 September 2018	What Men Want	
27 September 2018	Domestique	
18 October 2018	Trash on Mars	
1 November 2018	Vote for Kibera	
8 November 2018	Somewhere	
8 November 2018	Vratislav Effenberger or Black Shark Hunting	
27 November 2018	Moments	
6 December 2018	Mimi and Lisa – Christmas Lights Mystery	
31 January 2019	Jogging for Love	Highest-grossing Czech film.
4 April 2019	Shotgun Justice	
29 August 2019	Přes prsty	
26 September 2019	Jiří Suchý - Tackling Life with Ease	
21 November 2019	Owners	
28 November 2019	Jiří Trnka: A Long Lost Friend	
2 January 2020	Enchanted Feather	
6 July 2025	Broken Voices	It premiered at 59th Karlovy Vary International Film Festival on 6 July 2025, where it competed for Crystal Globe.
