= Toman (film) =

2018 Czech historical film

- Film poster
- Directed by: Ondřej Trojan
- Written by: Zdeňka Šimandlová; Ondřej Trojan
- Produced by: Ondřej Trojan
- Starring: Jiří Macháček
- Cinematography: Tomáš Sysel
- Edited by: Vladimír Barák
- Music by: Michal Novinski
- Production companies: Total HelpArt T.H.A.; Czech Television; PubRes
- Distributed by: Falcon
- Release dates: 2 August 2018; (Slavonice Film Festival); 4 October 2018 (Czech Republic)
- Running time: 145 minutes
- Countries: Czech Republic; Slovakia
- Language: Czech
- Budget: 48 million CZK
- Box office: $636,307

Toman, Zdeněk Toman, is a 2018 Czech historical film by Ondřej Trojan. It focuses on Zdeněk Toman, who led Czechoslovak intelligence from 1945 to 1948. It premiered at Slavonice Film Festival on 2 August 2018.

== Plot ==
The film follows the rise and fall of Zdeněk Toman, head of Czechoslovak Intelligence from 1945 to 1948. It started in April 1948 when Toman was interrogated by Inspector Putna. The film moved to March 1945 when Toman was repatriation officer in Carpathian Ruthenia. He comes into conflict with NKVD officers who insist that nobody will be repatriated from Carpathian Ruthenia as it will become part of Soviet Union. Toman bribes NKVD officers and later meets Imrich Rosenberg. Rosenberg asks Toman to help repatriate Jews from Carpathian Ruthenia. Toman agrees to help for money. Toman later organises a meeting of the exiled Czechoslovak government in Košice. He meets Václav Nosek, who agrees to help him with his career. Nosek helps Toman to become part of Czechoslovak Intelligence, which is led by non-communist General Josef Bartík. Toman befriends a prominent Communist Rudolf Slánský, who tasks Toman to get finances for the Communist Party of Czechoslovakia. Toman uses his contacts in Great Britain to get the finances and also rises in prominence. He replaces Bartík as the Head of Intelligence. He also uses his influence to help Jewish refugees and to help establish Israel. Toman's finances help Communists to win 1946 election. He meets Klement Gottwald but also becomes an enemy of the Communist Clique represented by Bedřich Reicin, which has ties in the Soviet Union. Toman's support for Israel gets him into conflict with the Soviets. Toman is removed from his position during the 1948 coup d'état. Toman is arrested while his wife commits suicide. Toman manages to escape, and with the help of Jewish representatives he previously helped, he escapes to Bavaria where he surrenders to American soldiers.

== Cast ==
- Jiří Macháček as Zdeněk Toman
- Kateřina Winterová as Pesla Tomanová
- Kristýna Boková as Milada Třískalová
- Stanislav Majer as Rudolf Slánský
- Marek Taclík as Bedřich Reicin
- Roman Luknár as Jan Masaryk
- Lukáš Latinák as Vlado Clementis
- Táňa Pauhofová as Aurélia Tomanová
- Lukáš Melník as František Kuracin
- Jaromír Dulava as Václav Nosek
- Jiří Dvořák as General Bártík
- Martin Finger as Adolf Püchler
- Aleš Procházka as Klement Gottwald
- Radek Holub as Karel Šváb
- Ondřej Malý as Aladar Berger
- Matěj Ruppert as Marian Kargul
- Jaroslav Plesl as Rosenberg
- Marián Mitaš as Karel Vaš
- Miroslav Táborský as Veselý
- Vladimír Hajdu as Zorin
- Václav Neužil as Bedřich Pokorný
- Pavel Liška as Evžen Zeman
- Lukáš Hlavica as JUDr. Horák
- Halka Třešňáková as Josefa Slánská
- Petr Vaněk as Gaynor Jacobson
- Jaroslav Kubera as Edvard Beneš

== Production ==
Zdeňka Šimandlová received request for screenplay about Zdeněk Toman. She worked on it for four years even after the request was taken back. Šimandlová approached Ondřej Trojan with the screenplay in 2010. Trojan became fascinated by the character of Zdeněk Trojan and agreed to make film according to the screenplay. The screenplay was severely modified to make it more historically accurate. Martin Šmok was invited to the production as a history advise to assure historical accuracy of the film.

Trojan started to gather finances for the film. He planned to start filming in 2014 but negotiations with Czech Television took longer than expected. Trojan decided to start when the film had 70% of finances ensured.

Filming started on 4 April 2017. It took place in Brdy and later moved to Prague. Some parts were filmed at Barrandov Studios. Shooting finished on 30 October 2017. Director and producer Ondřej Trojan announced that the film is expected to have difficult post-production.

== Release ==
Premiere was scheduled for 12 April 2018, but had to be moved to 4 October 2018 due to problematic post-production. The film eventually had a limited premiere for accredited audience at Slavonice Film Festival. It was distributed for Cinema on 4 October 2018.

== Reception ==
The film premiered at Slavonice Film Festival. It received positive reactions and a long ovation from audience. František Fuka published his review on 26 September 2018. He was writing of the film but praised final part of the film. Mirka Spáčilová called Toman a talking Enciclopedia. The film received overall mixed to positive reviews from critics as it holds 66% at Kinobox.cz. The film was nominated for 13 Czech Lion Awards.

=== Accolades ===
Date of ceremony	Award	Category	Recipient(s)	Result	Ref(s)
2019	Czech Lion Awards	Best Film		Nominated	
2019	Czech Lion Awards	Best Director	Ondřej Trojan	Nominated	
2019	Czech Lion Awards	Best Screenplay	Zdenka Simandlova, Ondřej Trojan	Nominated	
2019	Czech Lion Awards	Best Actor in a Leading Role	Jiří Macháček	Nominated	
2019	Czech Lion Awards	Best Actress in a Leading Role	Kateřina Winterová	Nominated	
2019	Czech Lion Awards	Best Actress in a Supporting Role	Kristýna Boková	Nominated	
2019	Czech Lion Awards	Best Editing	Vladimír Barák	Nominated	
2019	Czech Lion Awards	Best Music	Michal Novinski	Nominated	
2019	Czech Lion Awards	Best Sound	Jiří Klenka	Nominated	
2019	Czech Lion Awards	Best Stage Design	Tomáš Svoboda	Nominated	
2019	Czech Lion Awards	Best Cinematography	Tomáš Sysel	Nominated	
2019	Czech Lion Awards	Best Makeup and Hairstyling	Jana Bílková	Nominated	
2019	Czech Lion Awards	Best Costume Design	Katarína Štrbová Bieliková	Nominated	
2019	Czech Lion Awards	Best Poster	Tomáš Zilvar, Lukáš Francl, Barbara Trojanová, Maxmilian Denkr	Won	
2019	Trilobit Award	Audience Award	Ondřej Trojan	Won	
2019	Golden Kingfisher	Student Jury Award for Best Film	Ondřej Trojan	Won	
