= May the Lord Be with Us =

- Czech poster
- Written by: Pavel Kosatík
- Directed by: Zdeněk Jiráský
- Starring: Karel Dobrý, Ondřej Malý, Eva Josefíková
- Music by: Jan Čtvrtník
- Countries of origin: Czech Republic; Austria; Germany
- Original language: Czech

Production
- Producer: Martin Lubomírský
- Cinematography: Michal Černý
- Running time: 77 minutes
- Production companies: ČT, Arte and ORF

Original release
- Network: Czech Television
- Release: 13 May 2018

May the Lord Be with Us (Czech: Bůh s námi - od defenestrace k Bílé hoře, originally titled Defenestrace) is a 2018 Czech historical television film directed by Zdeněk Jiráský. It was coproduced by Czech Television, Arte and ORF. It premiered at Finále Plzeň Film Festival. The film was watched by 799,000 people.

== Plot ==
The film is set during the Bohemian Revolt that triggered the Thirty Years' War. The main characters are Jindřich Matyáš Thurn, Ferdinand II and Frederick I, known as the Winter King.

== Cast ==
- Karel Dobrý as Jindřich Matyáš Thurn
- Ondřej Malý as Ferdinand II, Holy Roman Emperor
- Eva Josefíková as Eleonora Gonzaga
- Štěpán Kozub as Frederick I of Bohemia
- Sára Sandeva as Elizabeth Stuart, Queen of Bohemia
- Tereza Hofová as Zuzana Alžběta Thurn
- Robert Mikluš as Kryštof Harant
- Jiří Maryško as Abraham Scultetus
- Adrian Jastraban as Vilém Slavata of Chlum
- Pavel Tesař as Jaroslav Bořita of Martinice
- Marek Pospíchal as Filip Fabricius
- Jiří Černý as Wilhelm Lamormaini
- Zdeněk Černín as Václav Budovec
- Ondřej Bauer as Jáchym Ondřej Šlik
- Dan Dittrich as Václav Vilém of Roupov
- Michal Dalecký as Young Officer
- Daniela Šišková as Lady's Maid

== Reception ==
Martin Staněk praised the film's focus on historical events. He also stated that the film was well-written and well-directed.
