= Pictures from the Insects' Life =

Theatre play by Karel and Josef Čapek

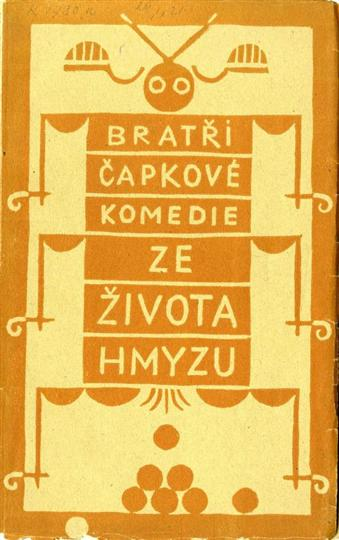
- Original language: Czech
- Written by: Karel Čapek; Josef Čapek
- Genre: satire

Premiere
- Date: 1922

Pictures from the Insects' Life (Czech: Ze života hmyzu) – also known as The Insect Play, The Life of the Insects, The Insect Comedy, The World We Live In and From Insect Life – is a satirical play that was written in Czech by the Brothers Čapek (Karel and Josef), who collaborated on 4 stage works, of which this is the most famous. It was published in 1921 and premiered in 1922.

In the play, a tramp/narrator falls asleep in the woods and dreams of observing a range of insects that stand in for various human characteristics in terms of their lifestyle and morality: the flighty, vain butterfly, the obsequious, self-serving dung beetle, the ants, whose increasingly mechanized behaviour leads to a militaristic society. The anthropomorphized insects allow the writers to comment allegorically on life in post-World War I Czechoslovakia.

== Translations ==
The first English version of the play was The Insect Play or And So Ad Infinitium, translated by Paul Selver, and adapted by Nigel Playfair and Clifford Bax published in 1923. Another English version of Selver's text was "The World We Live In" by Owen Davis in 1933; both of these adaptations are incomplete. Act II of the play was translated by Robert T. Jones and Tatiana Firkušnỷ in 1990 for the book Towards the Radical Center: A Karel Čapek Reader. Peter Majer and Cathy Porter published a complete English translation, titled The Insect Play for Methuen Drama in 1999.

== Production history ==
The play premiered in 1922 at the National Theatre in Brno, Czechoslovakia. Successful American (1922) and British (5 May 1923) premieres followed. BBC Television has presented the play three times, to varying critical response: first 30 May 1939, in a production by Stephen Thomas; then 28 May 1950 (Selver translation adapted and produced by Michael Barry, with Bernard Miles as the tramp); then 19 June 1960 directed by Hal Burton. It was adapted for radio by Ian Cotterell and broadcast on 1 Sep 1975 on the BBC Home Service.

== Critical reception ==
The Insect Play was often invoked in political discussions in the 1930s. E. M. Forster likened the conflict between the British Union of Fascists and the Communist Party of Great Britain to "a scene from The Insect Play". Ethel Mannin, writing in the anti-Stalinist magazine New Leader of July 6, 1936, described life in Stalin's Russia as resembling The Insect Play.

Discussing The Insect Play, Jarka M. Burien stated "Capek imbued the play with a vitality and color that made it a more fully entertaining theatrical experience than R.U.R.".

However, the 1960 BBC TV production was critically reviewed fifty years later, by a critic who called the text "pretentious and incoherent".

== Adaptations ==
Several works have been inspired by the play. Flann O'Brien produced a version of the play set in Ireland, Rhapsody in Stephen's Green. This version was thought lost, but a copy of the play was discovered in 1994. Finnish composer Kalevi Aho composed an opera Hyönteiselämää (Insect Life) in 1987, which was submitted to a competition for the Savonlinna Opera Festival. Aho's opera lost to Paavo Heininen's Veitsi, and was not performed until 1996 with the Finnish National Opera (for which it received great acclaim). Aho also adapted material from his opera into a symphony, Hyönteissinfonia (Insect Symphony), which premiered in 1988. This work, Aho's Seventh Symphony, features six movements, each a portrait of a different species of insect and reflecting the satirical characterizations of the play.

Another opera Zo života hmyzu (From the Insects' Life) based on the play was written by Ján Cikker and premiered in Bratislava in 1987.

Czech director Jan Švankmajer directed a film adaptation titled Insects. Before the film was released, Švankmajer stated that it "will combine dark comedy, grotesque, classic horror genre, and both animation and feature acting." The film premiered at the IFF Rotterdam on 26 January 2018 and had a theatrical release in the Czech Republic on 19 February 2018.
