= The Ecstasy of Saint Theresa (band) =

Czech rock band

- Origin: Prague, Czechoslovakia
- Genres: Alternative rock; shoegaze; ambient
- Years active: 1990–present
- Members: Jan P. Muchow; Kateřina Winterová
- Past members: Jan Gregar; Petr Wegner; Irna Libowitz; Petr Němeček; Petr Macháček; Ondřej Anděra
- Website: www.ecstasyofsttheresa.com

The Ecstasy of Saint Theresa is a Czech alternative rock band formed in 1990 by Jan Muchow, Jan Gregar, Petr Wegner, and Irna Libowitz.

The band released the EP Pigment in 1991. This album, along with 1992's Susurrate, featured a feedback-drenched psychedelic rock sound.

From there, the band moved into ambient and techno-influenced soundscapes, as evidenced by their 1993 album, Free-D, produced with Guy Fixsen (Laika). Free-D marked the end of the original lineup and something of a hiatus for the band. For the next six years, they only released the 1994 remix EP AstralaVista.

1999's In Dust 3 featured Muchow and actress Kateřina Winterová on eleven tracks of pop and post rock sounds. This was followed in 2003 by Slowthinking, released with the accompanying Fastmoving/Slowthinking DVD.

The Ecstasy of Saint Theresa released Watching Black in 2006, and in 2011, a DVD titled 101010 came out, featuring a live performance recorded on 10 October 2010.

== Band members ==
Current

- Jan P. Muchow – guitar, bass, programming
- Kateřina Winterová – vocals

Past

- Jan Gregar (1990–1994)
- Petr Wegner – drums (1990–1994)
- Irna Libowitz – vocals (1990–1994)
- Petr Němeček – drums (1997–1998)
- Petr Macháček (1997–1998)
- Ondřej Anděra (2002–2003)

== Discography ==
Studio albums

- Susurrate (1992)
- Free-D (1994)
- In Dust 3 (1999)
- Slowthinking (2002)
- Thirteen Years in Noises (2004)
- Watching Black (2006)

EPs

- Pigment (1991)
- ...fluidtrance centauri... (1993)
- AstralaVista (1994)
- Dumb It rmx's (2000)
- I'm (Not Really) Optimistic (2002)
- Local Distortion (2003)
- Happy R (2003)
- It (2005)

Singles

- "Moon Sun Anything" (2025)

Compilations

- 4B4 (2001)

DVDs

- Fastmoving / Slowthinking (2003)
- 101010 (2011)
