= Kateřina Winterová =

Czech actress and singer (born 1976)

- Born: 12 February 1976 (age 50); Benešov, Czechoslovakia
- Education: Prague Conservatory
- Occupations: Actress, singer
- Years active: 1993–present

Kateřina Winterová (born 12 February 1976) is a Czech actress, permanent member of the National Theatre in Prague, and vocalist for the band The Ecstasy of Saint Theresa.

== Life and career ==
=== Early life ===
Winterová was born in Benešov and spent the beginning of her childhood in Myšlín, before moving to Mělník. From 1990 to 1996, she attended the musical drama department at the Prague Conservatory. During her studies, she performed at the Divadlo pod Palmovkou theatre. From 1996 to 1998, she appeared as a guest at the Klicperovo divadlo theatre in Hradec Králové and at the National Theatre in Prague. Since 1998, she has been a permanent member there.

=== Music ===
In 1998, Winterová joined the alternative rock band The Ecstasy of Saint Theresa on vocals, which at the time consisted only of founding member Jan Muchow. She has since released four studio albums with the project.

In 2002, she won the Anděl Award for Singer of the Year.

In 2004, Winterová contributed vocals to "A Lovely Day Tomorrow", a single by British Sea Power, as well as its Czech-language version, "Zítra Bude Krásný Den".

=== Cooking ===
Between 2013 and 2017, together with actress Linda Rybová, Winterová hosted the television cooking show Vaříme podle herbáře. The two also wrote five cookbooks, based on the show. Winterová has gone on to write several more food-related books.

== Awards and nominations ==
- Anděl Award – Singer of the Year (2002)
- Nominated for Thalia Award – A Doll's House (2011)
- Nominated for Alfred Radok Award – A Doll's House (2011)
- Nominated as Best Actress at the Czech Lion Awards – Toman (2018)

== Discography ==
with the Ecstasy of Saint Theresa

- In Dust 3 (1999)
- Slowthinking (2002)
- Watching Black (2006)
- 101010 (2011)

== Selected filmography ==
List of appearances, with year, title, and role shown
Year	Title	Role	Notes
2010	Pojišťovna štěstí	Klára Koutná	TV series – 15 episodes
2013	Terapie	Nina, Viktor's mom	TV series – 7 episodes
2017	Maria Theresia	Liza	Miniseries
2018	Toman	Pesla Tomanová	Film
