= Brothers Čapek =

Czech writers and political activists

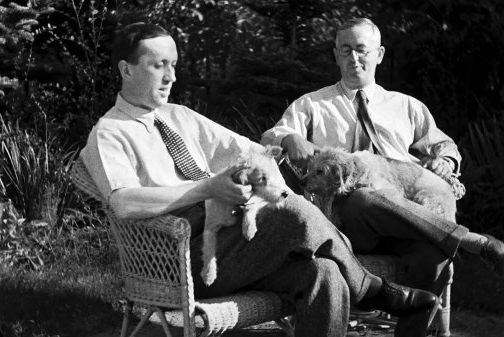
Karel Čapek (left) and Josef Čapek (right)

The Brothers Čapek were Josef and Karel Čapek, Czech writers who sometimes wrote together. They are commemorated both for their literary/artistic works and political activism against oppressive government. Their house is now a cultural monument of the Czech Republic, and there are various memorials to them. Their most famous joint work is the play Pictures from the Insects' Life, a humorous political allegory.

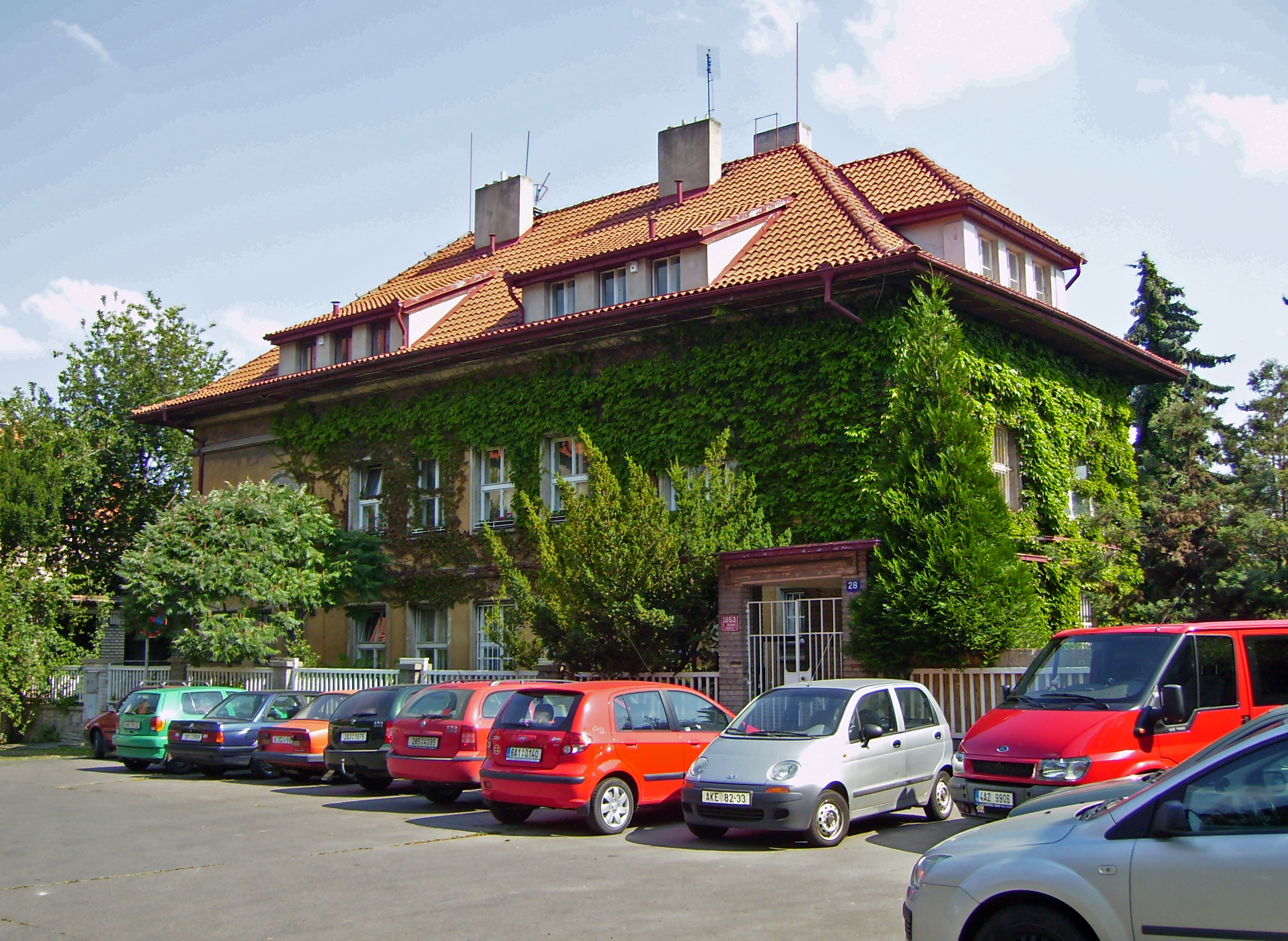
The Brothers' House, Bratří Čapků street, Prague

== Books ==
- Vibrant Depths (Zářivé hlubiny) 1916 – Collection of short stories, also illustrated by Josef. The title story refers to a supposedly unsinkable ship, the Oceanik.
- Giant Garden (Krakonošova zahrada) 1918 – Mixture of stories and essays, the title referring to countryside where they grew up.
- Nine Fairy Tales and another by Josef Čapek as an afterthought (Devatero pohádek) 1932 – Lessons from life for children.

== Plays ==
- The Highwayman (Loupežník) 1920
- Pictures from the Insects' Life (Ze života hmyzu) 1921
- Adam the Creator (Adam stvořitel) 1927
