= Hastrman =

2018 Czech romantic thriller film

- Film poster
- Directed by: Ondřej Havelka
- Written by: Ondřej Havelka, Petr Hudský
- Starring: Karel Dobrý, Simona Zmrzlá
- Cinematography: Diviš Marek
- Edited by: Jan Daňhel
- Music by: Petr Wajsar
- Release date: April 19, 2018
- Running time: 98 minutes
- Country: Czech Republic
- Language: Czech

Hastrman (also known as The Hastrman) is a 2018 Czech romantic thriller film directed by Ondřej Havelka. It is based on a novel of the same name by Miloš Urban. It is Havelka's first film as director. It premiered at the Finále Plzeň Film Festival 2018.

== Cast ==
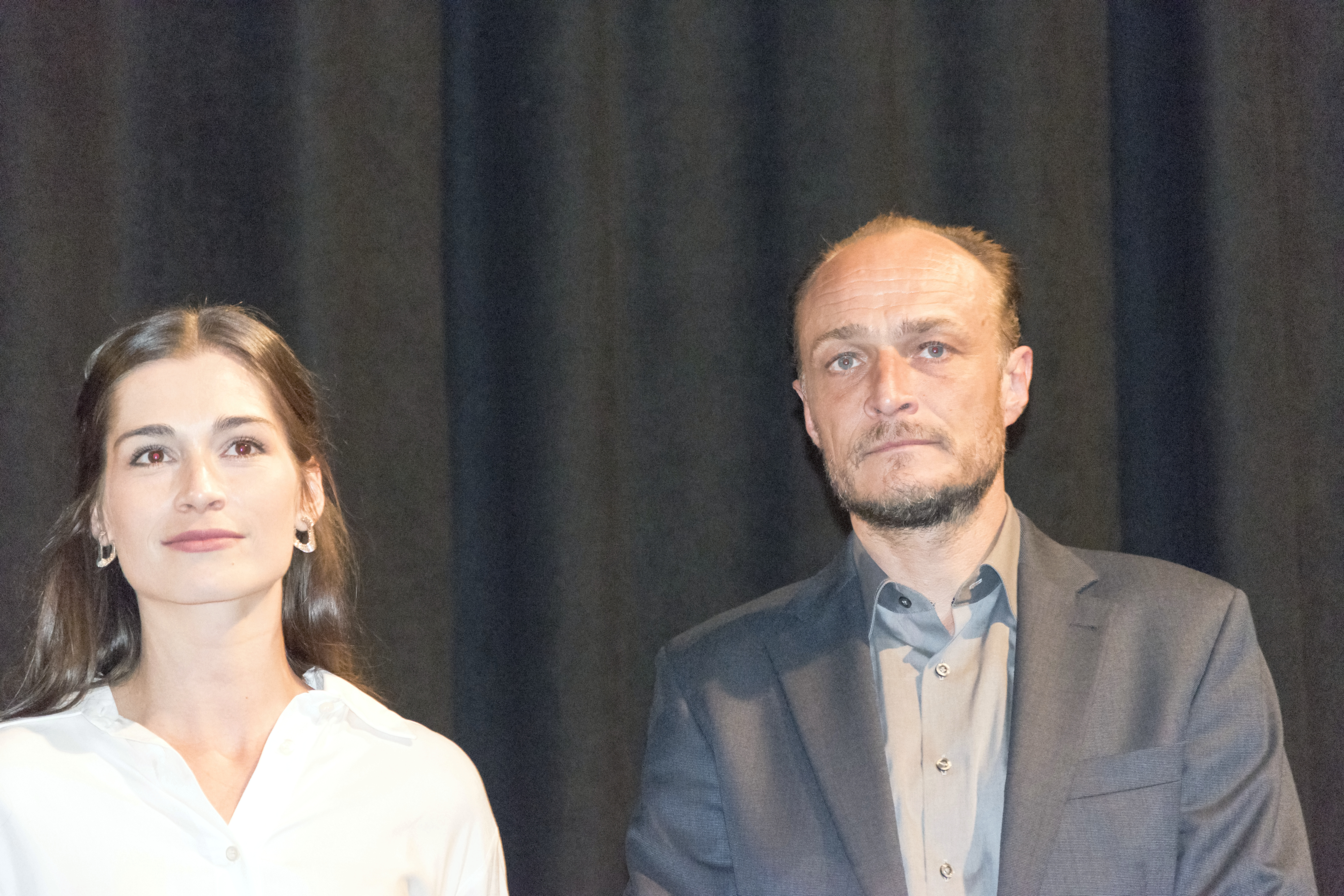
Karel Dobrý and Simona Zmrzlá at Journalist's projection

- Karel Dobrý as Baron de Casus
- Simona Zmrzlá as Katynka
- Jiří Lábus as Baron's servant Francl
- Jan Kolařík as Priest Fidelius
- Jiří Maryško as Teacher Voves
- David Novotný as Katynka's father Kolář
- Vladimír Polívka as Jakub
- Norbert Lichý
- Vojtěch Hrabák
- Andrea Berecková
- Jan Komínek
- Anna Kratochvílová
- Ivan Sochor

== Reception ==
The film received mixed to positive reviews from Czech critics. It holds a 65% score at the Kinobox aggregator. It won four awards at the 2018 Czech Lion Awards, including Best Actor.
