= Ekvtime: Man of God =

- Directed by: Nikoloz Khomasuridze
- Produced by: Nikoloz Khomasuridze
- Starring: Rezo Chkhikvishvili; Ana Tsereteli; Gogi Turkiashvili; Giorgi Megrelishvili; Lasha Oniani; Jano Izoria
- Cinematography: Vasili Dolidze
- Edited by: Nikoloz Khomasuridze, Elene Mgeladze
- Music by: Davit Archvadze
- Production company: Lost Legends
- Release date: 20 January 2018
- Running time: 140 minutes
- Country: Georgia
- Language: Georgian
- Budget: $500 000

Ekvtime: Man of God (Georgian: ექვთიმე ღვთისკაცი Ekvtime Ghvtisk’atsi) is a 2018 Georgian film directed by Nikoloz Khomasuridze and written by Lasha Kankava, Nikoloz Khomasuridze.

== Plot ==
In February 1921, when the Soviet Red Army invaded independent Georgia, the government decided to collect all the treasury property and museum treasures and flee to France in emigration. They entrusted Ekvtime Takaishvili to collect the treasure and appointed him as a guard. The film's story is about hard life and activities of Ekvtime Takaishvili (actor - Rezo Chkhikvishvili), which mainly includes the history of the protection of the treasury in France during the emigration period in 1921-1945 and how Ekvtime Takaishvili returned it. The film is accompanied by the love story of Ekvtime and his charming wife and companion Nino Poltaratskaya (actress - Ana Tsereteli). Ekvtime himself defended the Georgian treasure from the world famous museums, rich collectors, court disputes, criminals and fascists to endure all the temptations and never deviated from the supreme moral principles and love of the Motherland, what is eternal in this world. In 2002 the Georgian Holly Church canonized Ekvtime Takaishvili and named him as „Man of God“.
