= Josef Čapek =

Czech painter and writer (1887–1945)

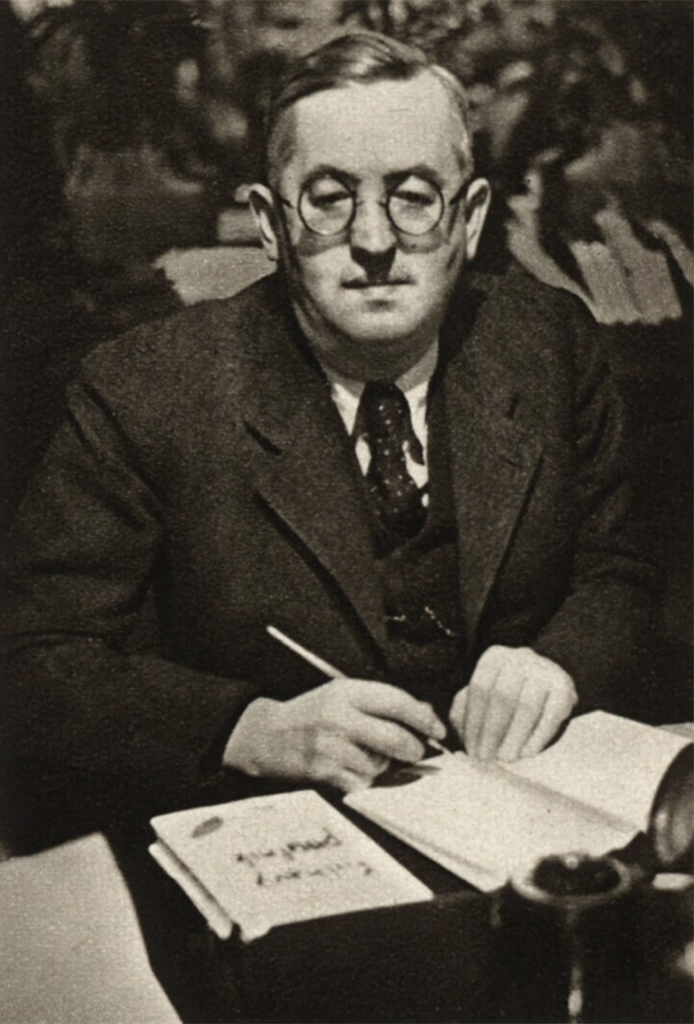
- Čapek in 1937
- Born: 23 March 1887; Hronov, Bohemia, Austria-Hungary
- Died: April 1945 (aged 58); Lower Saxony, Nazi Germany
- Known for: Invented the word 'robot'
- Notable work: Povídání o Pejskovi a Kočičce; Pictures from the Insects' Life
- Movement: Cubism

Josef Čapek (Czech pronunciation: [ˈjozɛf ˈtʃapɛk]; 23 March 1887 – April 1945) was a Czech artist who was best known as a painter, but who was also noted as a writer and poet. He invented the word 'robot', which was introduced into literature by his brother, Karel Čapek.

== Life ==
Čapek was born in Hronov, Bohemia, Austria-Hungary, (now the Czech Republic) in 1887. First a painter of the Cubist school, he later developed his own playful, minimalist style. He collaborated with his brother Karel on a number of plays and short stories; on his own, he wrote the utopian play Land of Many Names and several novels, as well as critical essays in which he argued for the art of the unconscious, of children, and of 'savages'. He was named by his brother as the true inventor of the term robot. As a cartoonist, he worked for Lidové noviny, a newspaper based in Prague.

His illustrated stories Povídání o Pejskovi a Kočičce (English translation as The Adventures of Puss and Pup) are considered classics of Czech children's literature.

== Death ==
Due to his critical attitude towards national socialism and Adolf Hitler, he was arrested after the German invasion of Czechoslovakia in 1939. He wrote Poems from a Concentration Camp in the Bergen-Belsen concentration camp, where he died in 1945. In June 1945 Rudolf Margolius, accompanied by Čapek's wife Jarmila Čapková, went to Bergen-Belsen to search for him. His remains were never found. In 1948, the court officially set 30 April 1947 as the date that he could not survive.

== Selected literary works ==
- Lelio, 1917;
- Ze života hmyzu (Pictures from the Insects' Life), 1921 – with Karel Čapek;
- Povídání o pejskovi a kočičce (The Adventures of Puss and Pup), 1929;
- Stín kapradiny, 1930, novel;
- Kulhavý poutník, essays, 1936;
- Land of Many Names;
- Básně z koncentračního tabora (Poems from a Concentration Camp), published posthumously 1946;
- Adam Stvořitel (Adam the Creator) – with Karel Čapek;
- Dášeňka, čili život štěněte (Dashenka, consequently the life of a Puppy) – with Karel Čapek, illustrated by Josef.

== Gallery ==
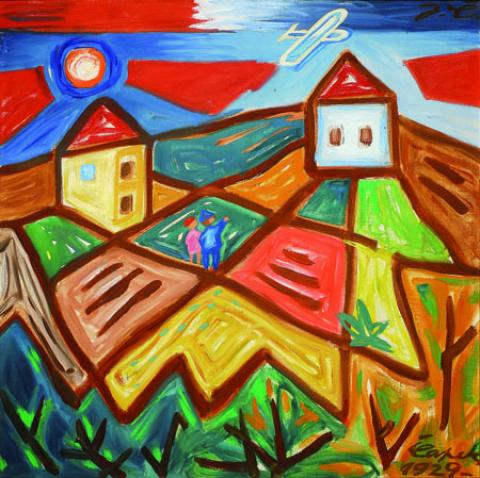
Letadlo (Aeroplane)

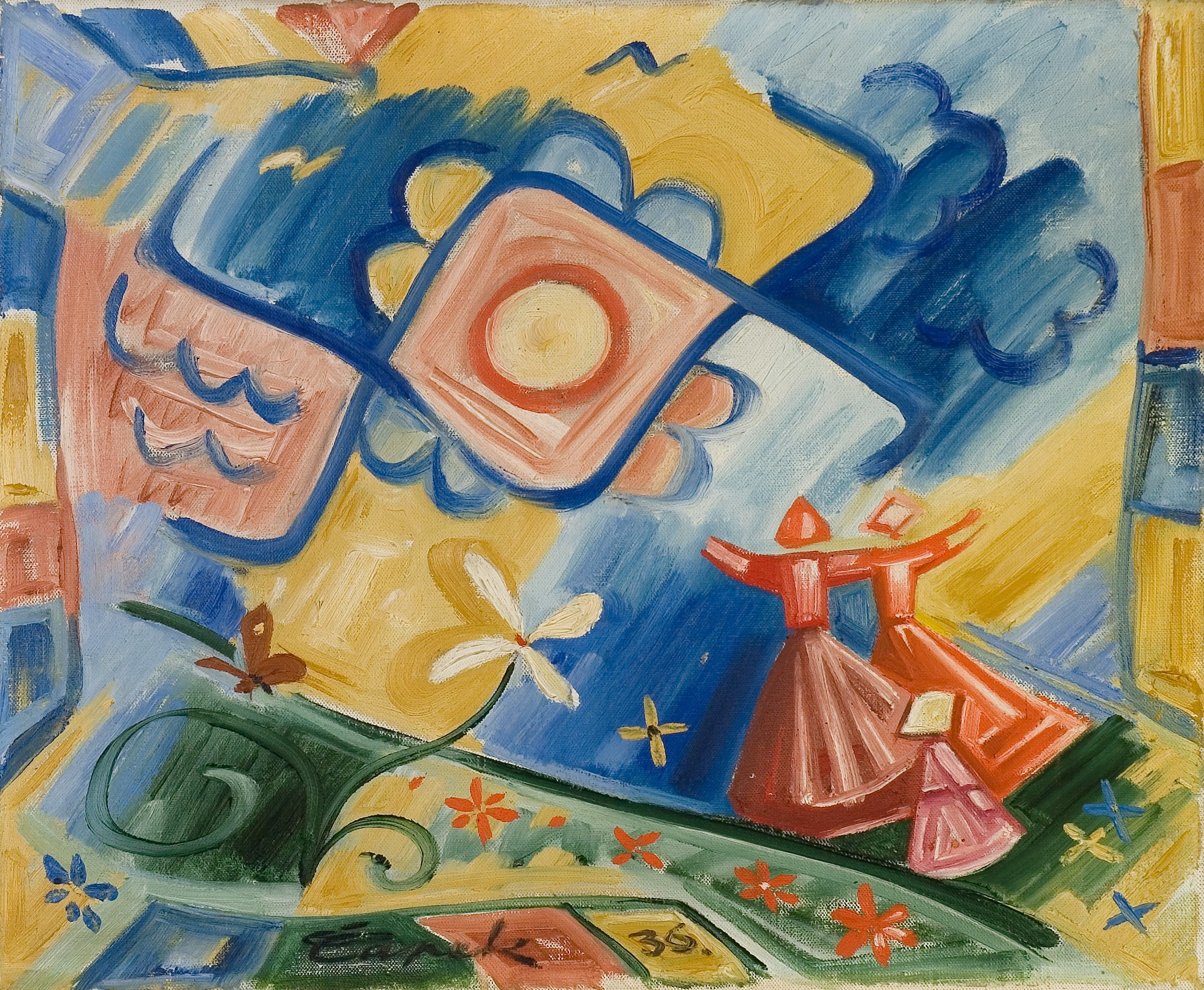
Zpívající děvčata (Singing girls)

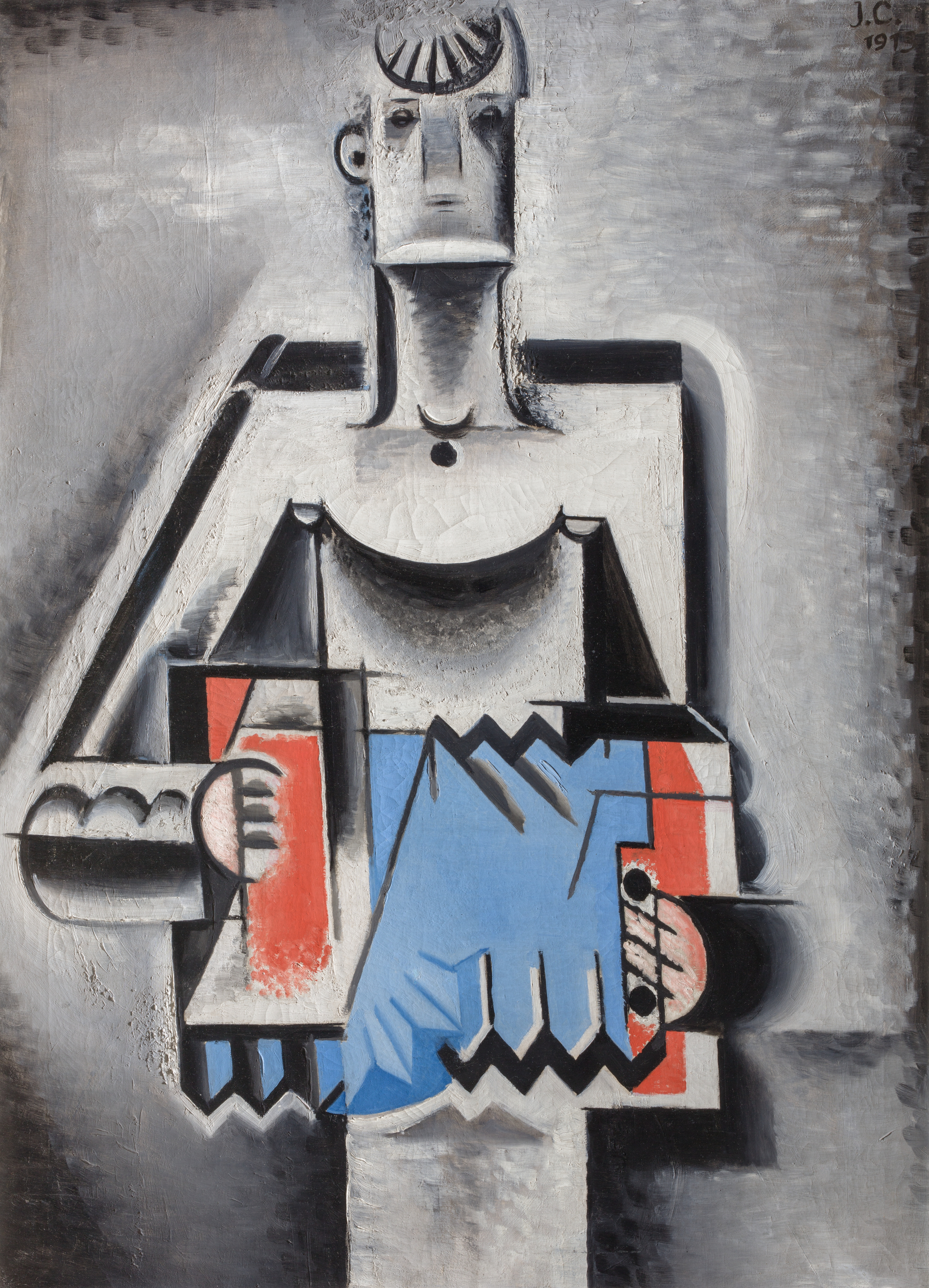
Harmonikář (Harmonist)

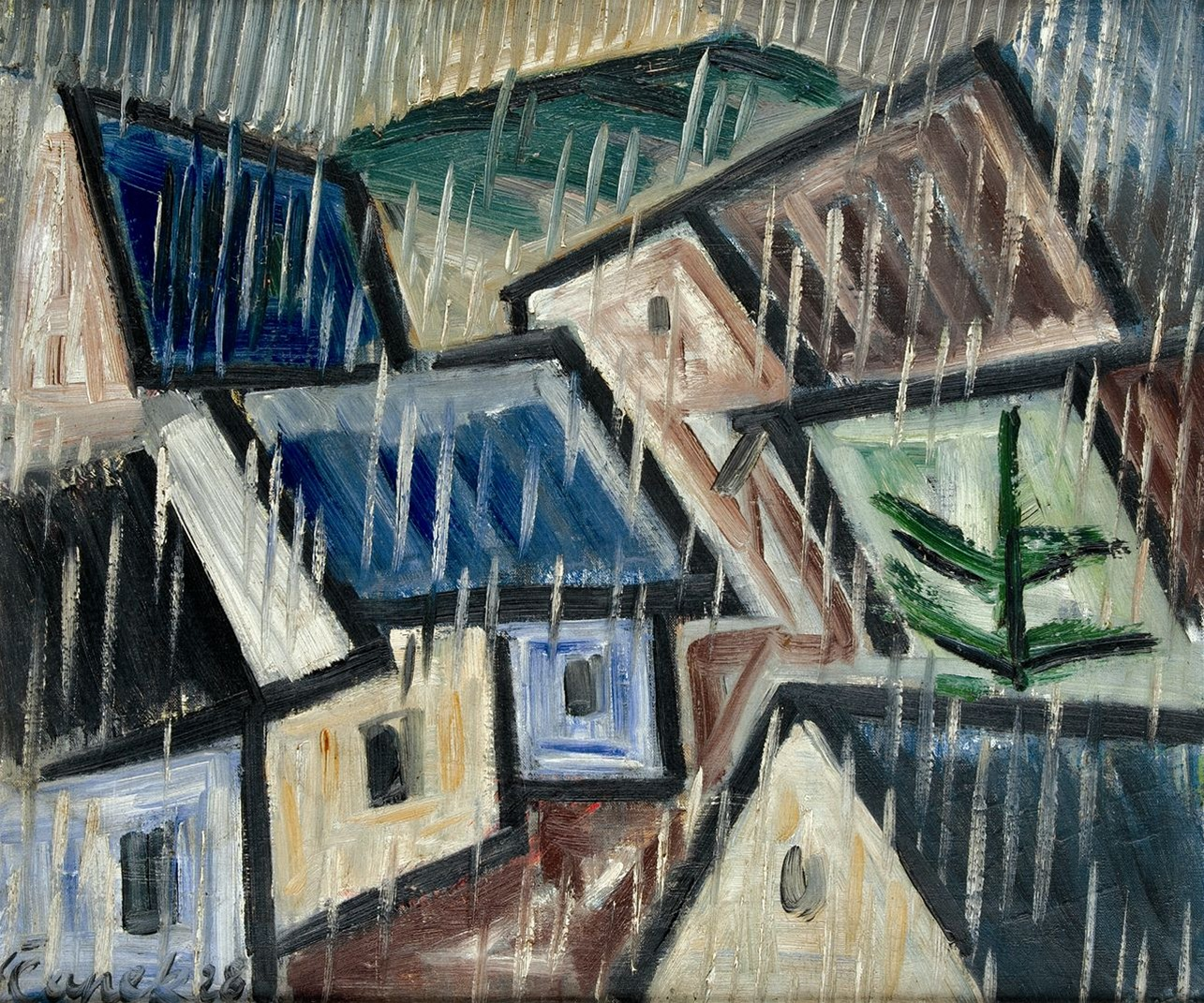
Krajina v dešti (Landscape in the rain)

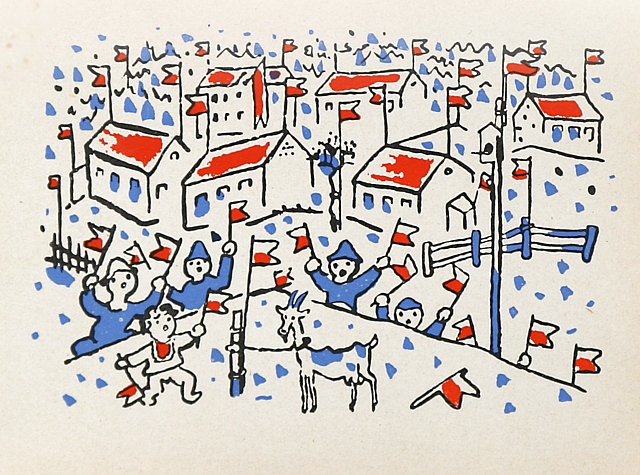
Kluci s kozou (Guys with a goat)

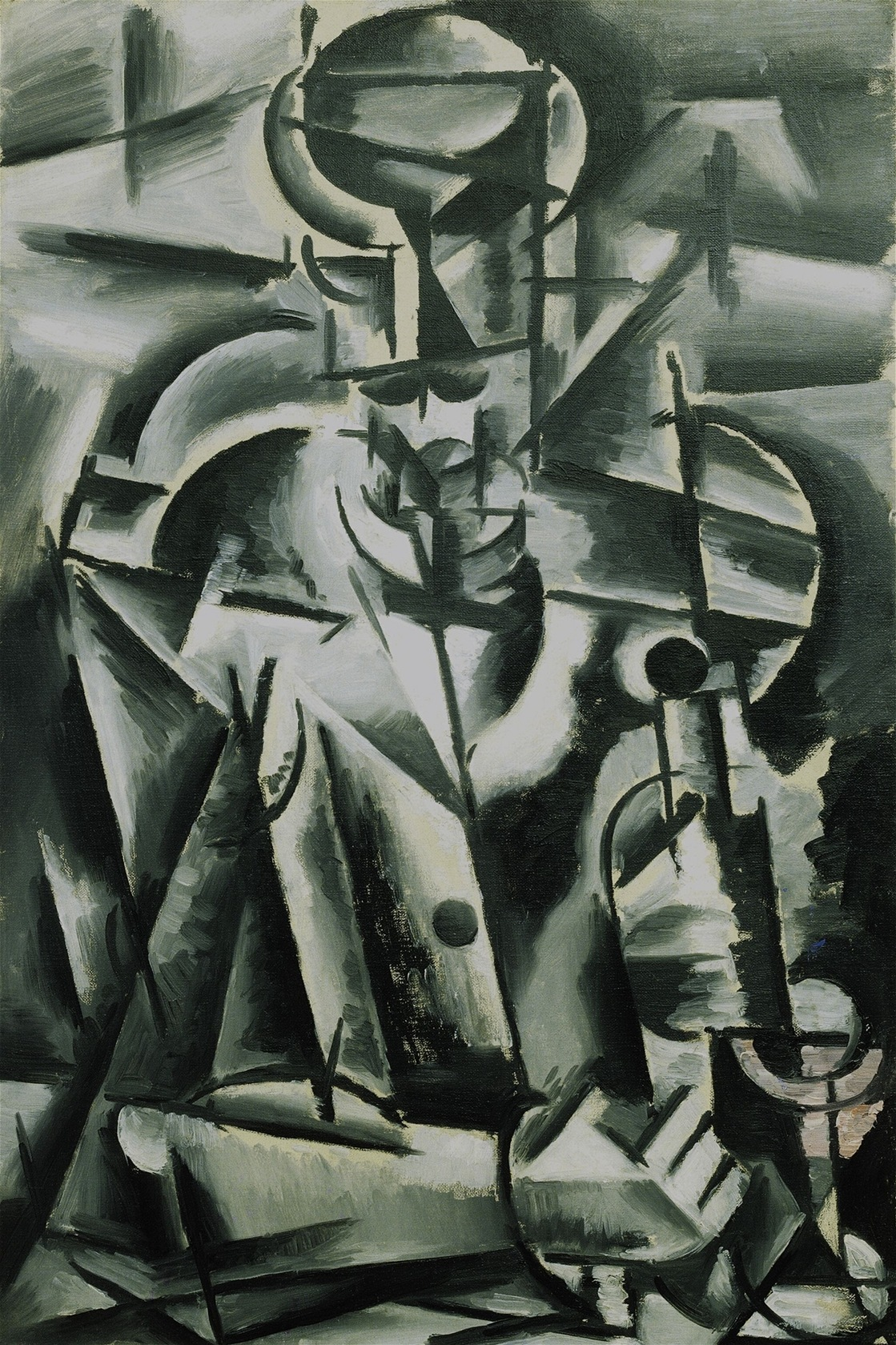
Piják (Drunkard)

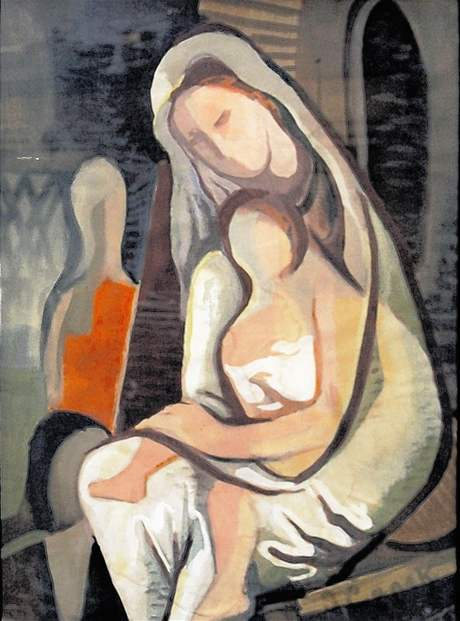
Matka s dětmi (Mother with children)

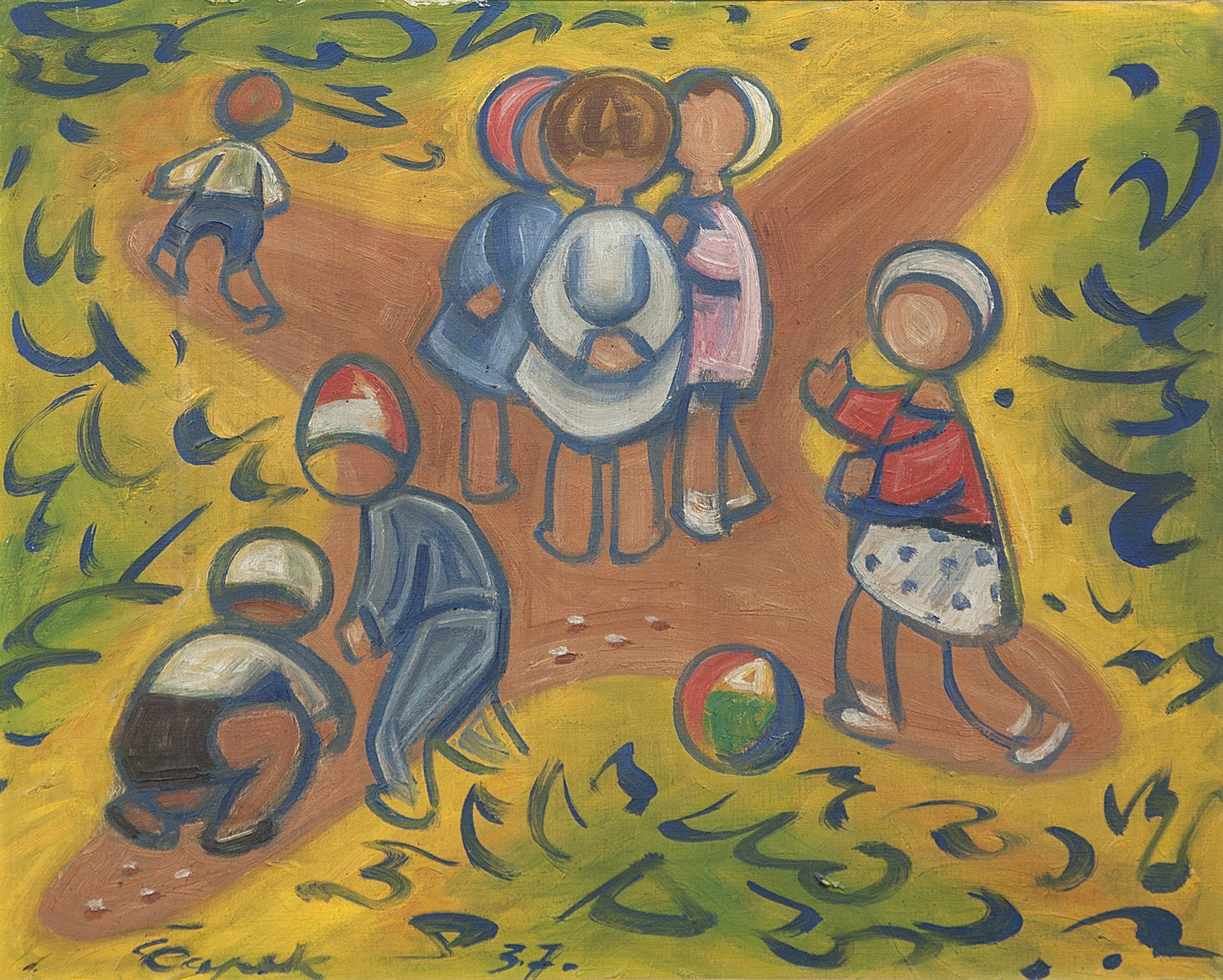
Hra (Game)

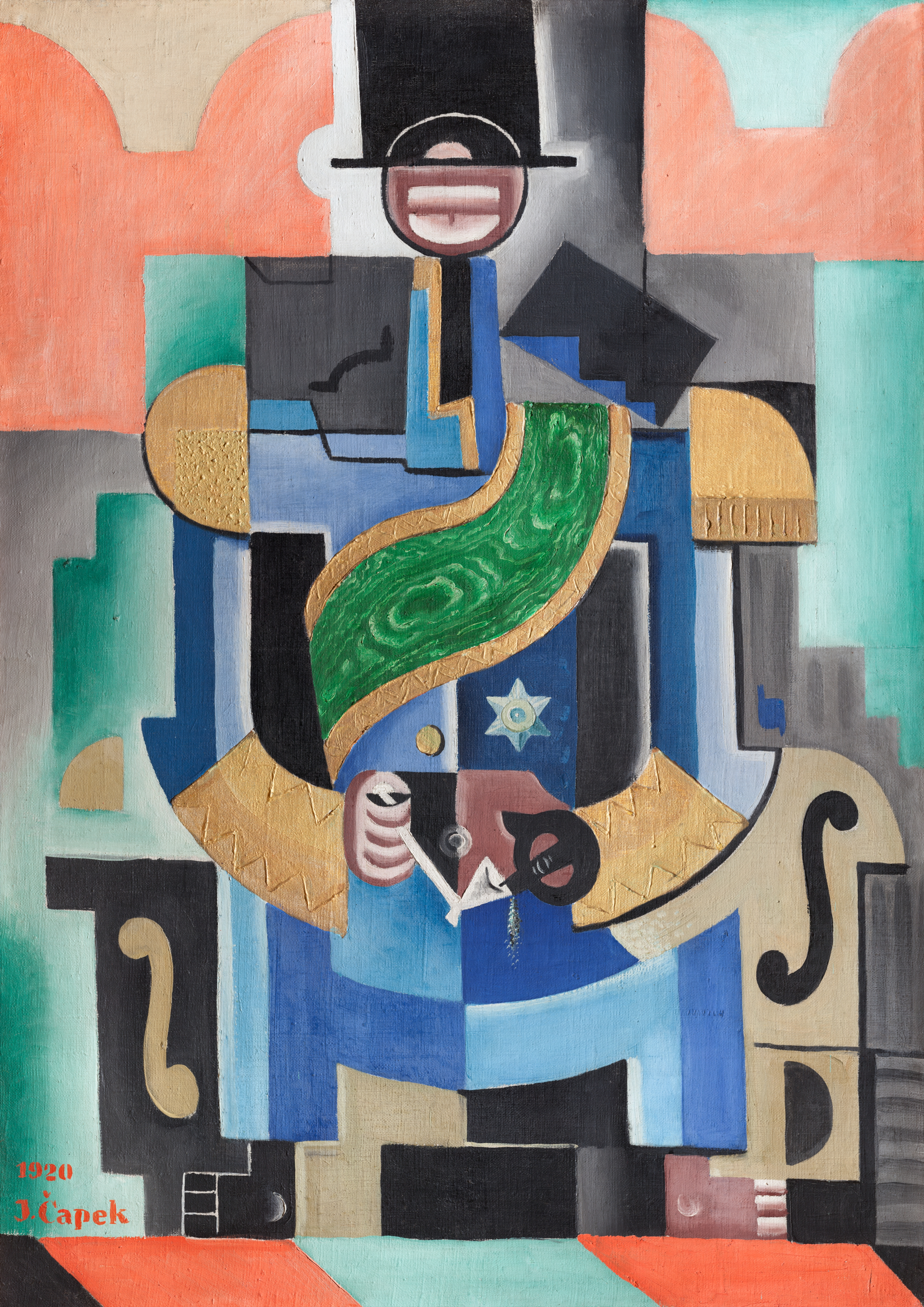
African King

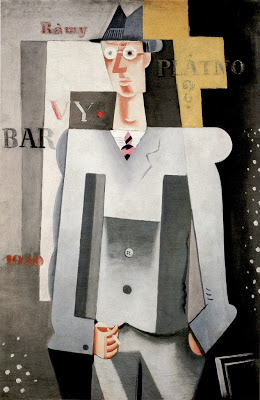
Autoportrét (Self-portrait)

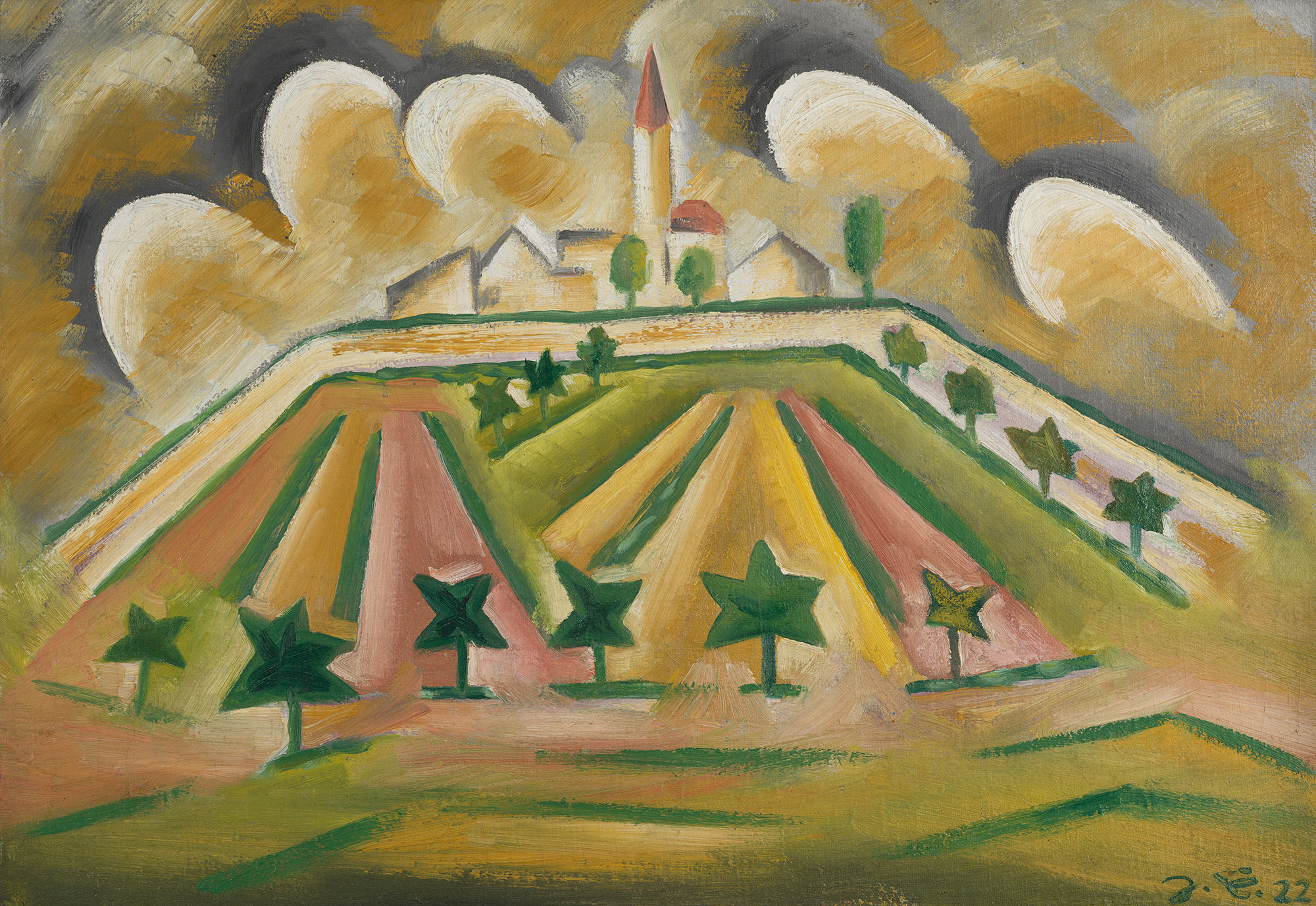
Kostelík na kopci (A Little Church on a Hill)

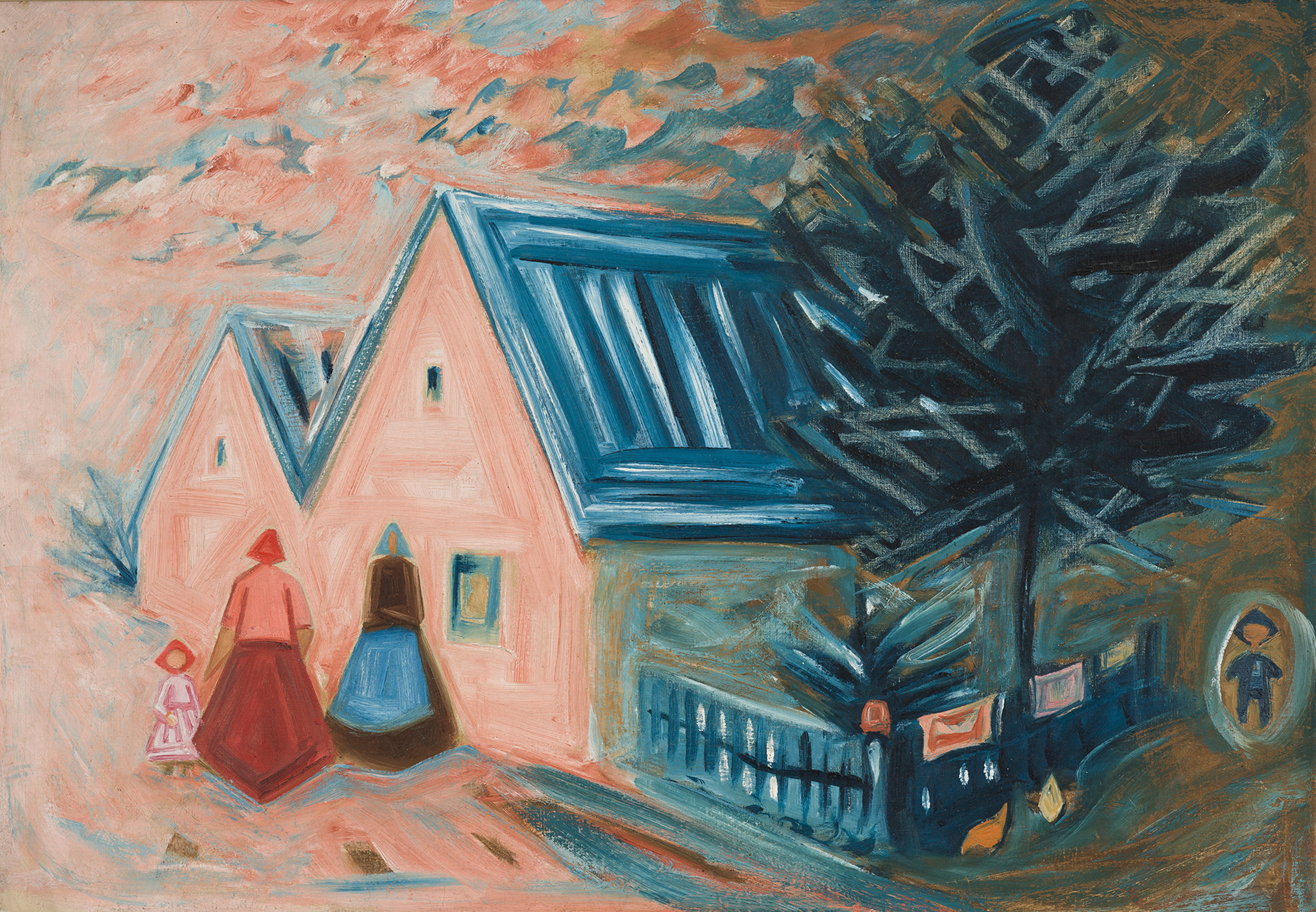
Ráno (Morning)

== Literature ==
- Ivan Margolius, "The Robot of Prague", Newsletter, The Friends of Czech Heritage no. 17, Autumn 2017, pp. 3–6. https://czechfriends.net/images/RobotsMargoliusJul2017.pdf
- Marie Šulcová. Čapci, Ladění pro dvě struny, Poločas nadějí, Brána věčnosti, Prague: Melantrich 1993-1998
- Marie Šulcová. Prodloužený čas Josefa Čapka, Prague: Paseka 2000

== See also ==
- Brothers Čapek
