= Insects (film) =

- Poster
- Directed by: Jan Švankmajer
- Written by: Jan Švankmajer
- Based on: Pictures from the Insects' Life by Karel Čapek and Josef Čapek
- Starring: Jiří Lábus, Jan Budař, Kamila Magálová
- Cinematography: Adam Olha, Jan Ruzicka
- Edited by: Jan Danhel
- Production companies: Athanor; Czech Television; PubRes
- Distributed by: CinemArt; PubRes
- Release dates: 26 January 2018 (IFF Rotterdam); 19 February 2018 (Czech Republic)
- Running time: 98 minutes
- Countries: Czech Republic; Slovakia
- Language: Czech
- Budget: 40 million CZK

Insects (Czech: Hmyz) is a 2018 surrealist comedy film directed by Jan Švankmajer, the film is based on the play Pictures from the Insects' Life by Karel and Josef Čapek. Švankmajer stated that the film would be his last. It premiered on 26 January 2018 at International Film Festival Rotterdam. The film follows amateur actors rehearsing Pictures from the Insects' Life. The actors find themselves living out their characters' roles and hallucinating insects. Insects is intercut with the creative process of the film itself and interviews with the actors about their dreams.

== Cast ==
- Jaromír Dulava as the Director ("Mr. Cricket"), the meticulous and irritable husband of Ružena; he is passionate about acting and tries his best to make the failing actors best fit his vision.
- Kamila Magálova as Rose/Ružena ("Mrs. Cricket"), the adulterous wife of the Director; she plays Mrs. Cricket, who is an expecting mother; she is not passionate about acting and regularly forgets stage directions.
- Jan Budar as William/Václav ("Sabre Wasp"), Ružena's lover, who is open about his affair; he is assigned to play the Sabre Wasp, whose role is to murder the Crickets; he resents the Director.
- Jirí Lábus as Charlie Forrest/Borovička ("Dung Beetle"), a bumbling aspiring actor who has trouble reading; he becomes obsessed with his character once coming into contact with an actual dung beetle.
- Ivana Uhlírová as Jilly/Jituška ("Larva"), a squeamish and neurotic ballerina who is afraid of insects; she plays the Larva of the Sabre Wasp and experiences many hallucinations of cockroaches and ants.
- Norbert Lichy as Nettle/Kopriva ("Parasite"), a sleepy police officer and a friend of the Director; he plays the idealistic Parasite, who considers insects hoarding food an injustice; he finds himself wanting to eat Jituška.

== Production ==
The film had a projected budget of 40 million CZK and a preliminary release set for 2017. The world premiere was then confirmed for the 2018 International Film Festival Rotterdam. The film is based on the play Pictures from the Insects' Life by Karel and Josef Čapek, which Švankmajer described as following: "From the Life of Insects is a misanthropic play. My screenplay only extends this misanthropy, as man is more like an insect and this civilisation is more like an anthill. One should also remember the message in Kafka’s The Metamorphosis." In May 2016, Athanor Production Co. launched an Indiegogo campaign to crowdfund $150,000 for the film. The campaign ended on February 20, 2018, and managed to raise $305,927, surpassing its initial goal by 81%.
