= Winter Flies =

- Czech: Všechno bude
- Directed by: Olmo Omerzu
- Written by: Petr Pýcha
- Produced by: Jiří Konečný
- Starring: Tomáš Mrvík, Jan František Uher
- Cinematography: Lukáš Milota
- Distributed by: CinemArt
- Release dates: 1 July 2018 (KVIFF); 6 September 2018 (Czech Republic)
- Running time: 85 minutes
- Countries: Czech Republic; Slovakia; Slovenia; Poland
- Language: Czech

Winter Flies (Czech: Všechno bude) is a 2018 road comedy-drama film directed by Olmo Omerzu and written by Petr Pýcha. It premiered at Karlovy Vary International Film Festival on 1 July 2018.

Olmo Omerzu has won a Best Director Award at Karlovy Vary International Film Festival. It was selected as the Czech entry for the Best Foreign Language Film at the 91st Academy Awards, but it was not nominated.

== Plot ==
The film follows two boys - Mára and Heduš. Heduš runs away from home. He joins Mára who tells him that he is running away from home. They drive through countryside in a Mára's car. They meet hitchhiker Bára who joins them. Both boys dream about having sex with her but she locks herself in the car during the night and the boys have to sleep outside. Mára reveals to Heduš that he goes to his grandfather who is a retired military officer. The boys eventually get to Mára's grandfather who suffers a heart attack and the boys get him to hospital. Mára is later arrested by 2 police officers who interrogate him. The film ends when Heduš creates an incident outside the police station which allows Mára to escape.

== Cast ==
- Tomáš Mrvík as Mára
- Jan František Uher as Heduš
- Eliška Křenková as Bára
- Lenka Vlasáková as Policewoman
- Martin Pechlát as Policeman

== Production ==
Petr Pýcha has written radio play inspired by a story he read on an internet. His play was refused for vulgarity and he decide to rewrite it to a film screenplay. Pýcha saw Omerzu's previous film A Night Too Young and decided to ask Omerzu to direct the film. Omerzu liked it and started preparations of the film. Casting for main roles took very long Omerzu wanted non-actors who can find themselves in their characters. The film was mostly shot in North Bohemia.

== Release ==
The film premiered at 2018 Karlovy Vary International Film Festival. The film had a journalist projection on 24 August 2018. It was followed by press conference during which filmmakers were questioned about the film. The film was distributed to Czech cinemas on 4 September 2018 and later presented at multiple International film festivals.

== Reception ==
=== Accolades ===
Date of ceremony	Award	Category	Recipient(s)	Result	Ref(s)
2018	Karlovy Vary International Film Festival	Best Director Award	Olmo Omerzu	Won	
2019	Czech Film Critics' Awards	Best Film		Nominated	
2019	Czech Film Critics' Awards	Best Director	Olmo Omerzu	Won	
2019	Czech Film Critics' Awards	Best Screenplay	Petr Pýcha	Nominated	
2019	Czech Lion Awards	Best Film		Won	
2019	Czech Lion Awards	Best Director	Olmo Omerzu	Won	
2019	Czech Lion Awards	Best Screenplay	Petr Pýcha	Won	
2019	Czech Lion Awards	Best Actor in a Leading Role	Tomáš Mrvík	Nominated	
2019	Czech Lion Awards	Best Actress in a Supporting Role	Eliška Křenková	Won	
2019	Czech Lion Awards	Best Actress in a Supporting Role	Lenka Vlasáková	Nominated	
2019	Czech Lion Awards	Best Actor in a Supporting Role	Jan František Uher	Won	
2019	Czech Lion Awards	Best Music	Monika Midriaková, Šimon Holý, Paweł Szamburski	Nominated	
2019	Czech Lion Awards	Best Editing	Jana Vlčková	Won	
2019	Czech Lion Awards	Best Cinematography	Lukáš Milota	Nominated	

== See also ==
- List of submissions to the 91st Academy Awards for Best Foreign Language Film
- List of Czech submissions for the Academy Award for Best Foreign Language Film
