= Karel Dobrý =

Czech actor (born 1969)

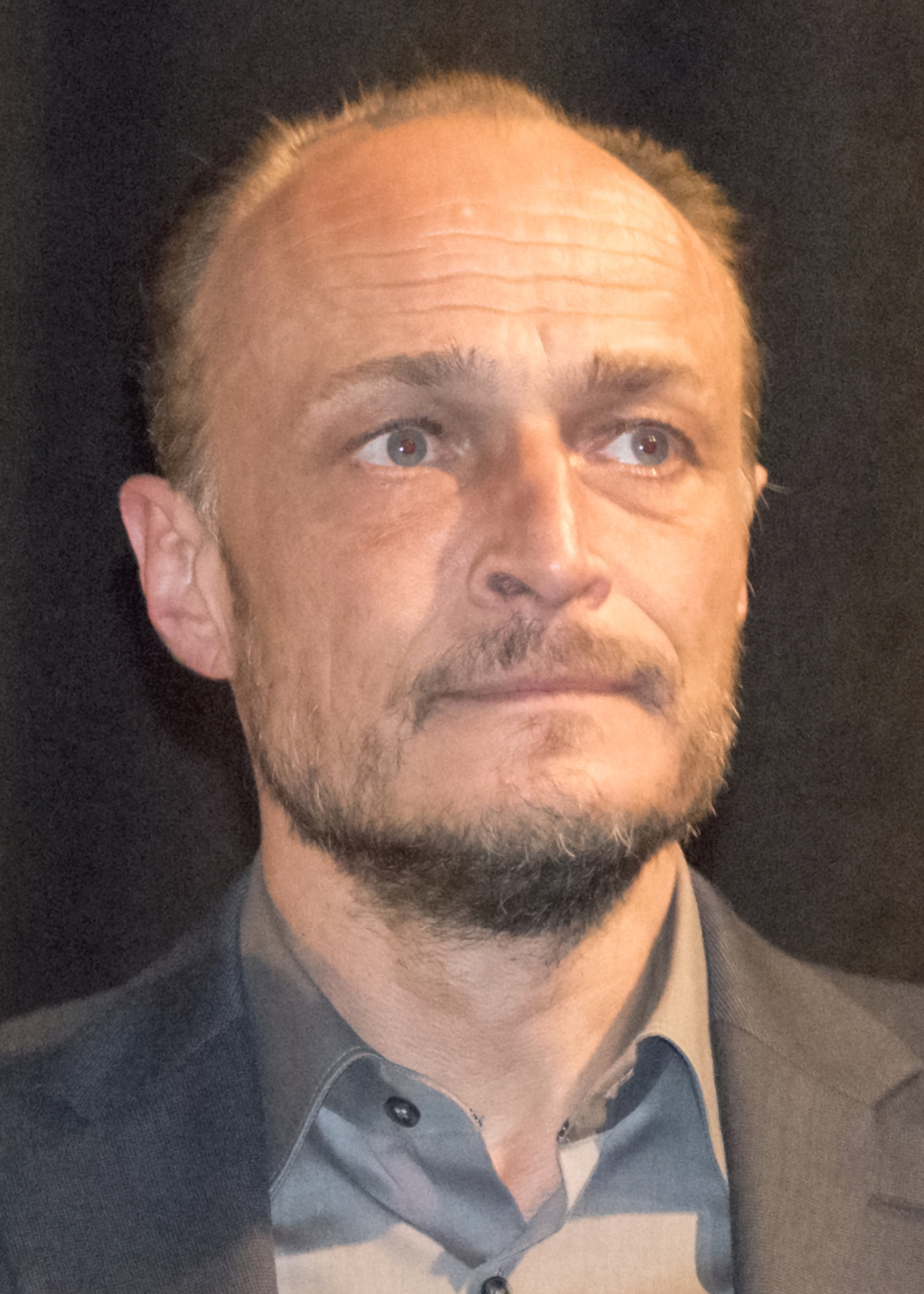
- Dobrý in 2018
- Born: 2 May 1969 (age 57); Karlovy Vary, Czechoslovakia
- Occupation: Actor
- Years active: 1991–present

Karel Dobrý (born 2 May 1969) is a Czech film, television and stage actor. He is known for playing Liet-Kynes in the Dune 2000 miniseries, and Korba in the 2003 sequel Children of Dune, and as Matthias in Mission: Impossible. He also appeared in the award-winning film The Girl of Your Dreams by Fernando Trueba.

== Biography ==
He was born 2 May 1969 in Karlovy Vary. He was raised in Prague and spent part of his childhood living in Syria. He speaks Czech, Russian, German, and English.

== Selected filmography ==
- Elektro, má lásko (1991, TV Movie) – Orestes
- La patience de Maigret (1993, TV Series) – Serveur Tropical
- The Adventures of Young Indiana Jones: Attack of the Hawkmen (1995, TV Movie) – Göring
- Sacred Cargo (1995) – Barishvili
- Jak si zasloužit princeznu (1995) – The Strongest
- UŽ (1995) – Butch
- Mission: Impossible (1996) – Matthias
- Let's Make an Opera (1996) – Burglar
- La niña de tus ojos (1998, Short) – Leo
- Plunkett & Macleane (1999) – Lewd Young Man
- Spring of Life - Der Lebensborn (2000) – Odillo
- Jabloňová panna (2000, TV Movie) – Prince
- Frank Herbert's Dune (2000, TV Mini-Series) – Liet-Kynes
- Kytice (2000) – King (segment "Zlatý kolovrat")
- A Knight's Tale (2001) – Flanders King of Arms
- Cabriolet (2001)
- Anne Frank: The Whole Story (2001, TV Mini-Series) – Commandment
- The Mists of Avalon (2001, TV Mini-Series) – Rhiannon
- Ratten - sie werden dich kriegen (2001, TV Movie) – Reporter
- Szach (2001) – Jakub
- Černí andělé, episode "Červená karta" (2002, TV Series) – Panenka
- Doctor Zhivago (2002, TV Mini-Series) – Mayakovsky
- Četnické humoresky, episode "Dědic" (2002, TV Series) – Josef Kalousek
- Nezvěstný (2003, TV Movie) – Hušner
- Krysař (2003) – Devil / Destiny
- Tajemný svícen (2003, TV Movie) – Devil
- Frank Herbert's Children of Dune (2003, TV Mini-Series) – Korba
- Trosečníci (2003) – Sailor (segment "Kráska a netvor")
- NaPolA (2004) – SS-Arzt
- Der neunte Tag (2004) – Reporter Bertram
- Krev zmizelého (2005)– Brand
- Hui Bůh (2006) – Ritter Ottokar
- Maharal - tajemstvi talismanu (2007) – Receptionist
- Skeletoni (2007, Short) – Pokálený pán
- Flammen & Citronen (2008) – Seibold
- Báthory (2008) – Royal Guard Commander
- The Counterpart (2008, Short) – Italian Captain
- Ocas ještěrky (2009) – Čihák
- Jménem krále (2009) – Adalbert of Jestřebí
- Strážce duší (2009, TV Series) – Richard
- Janosik. Prawdziwa historia (2009) – Plavčík
- We Shoot with Love (2009) – Bad Guy (segment "Pulse Beat")
- Joséphine, ange gardien (2010, TV Series) – Lieutenant
- Utomlennye solntsem 2 (2010) – Nemetskiy letchik
- Klub osamělých srdcí (2010, TV Movie) – Jagol
- Vyprávěj (2010-2012, TV Series) – Matěj Stránský
- 4teens (2011, TV series) – Láďa Kocman, lieutenant
- Faust (2011) – Soldier
- Znamení koně (2011, TV Series) – Karel Dejmek
- Borgia (2011-2014, TV Series) – Giovanni Colonna
- Missing (2012, TV Series) – Coffee Man
- L'olimpiade nascosta (2012, TV Movie) – Pavel Kubík
- In the Shadow (2012) – Muz z rozhlasu
- Tigre v meste (2012) – Kužnikov
- Bullet for Heydrich (The Czech Century) (2013, TV Series) – General lev prchala
- České století, episode "Den po Mnichovu" (2013, TV Series) – Lev Prchala, general
- Cirkus Bukowsky (2013-2014, TV Series) – Hartman, lawyer
- Child 44 (2015) – Photographer
- Lída Baarová (2016) – Gerhard Lamprecht, film director
- Strasidla (2016) – Ignác
- Zahradnictví: Rodinný prítel (2017) – Karel
- The Adventurers (2017) – Yelyuk (The Buyer)
- Zahradnictví: Dezertér (2017) – Karel
- Milada (2017) – NKVD Agent Lichacev
- Zahradnictví: Nápadník (2017) – Karel
- Certoviny (2017) – Lucifer
- The Catcher Was a Spy (2018) – Cold-Eyed German
- Hastrman (2018) – Baron Johann Salmon de Caus
- May the Lord Be with Us (2018) – Jindrich Matyás Thurn
- A War Within (2018) – Doctor
- The Glass Room (2019) – Láník
- Carnival Row (2023) – Pact Ambassador Anrep (6 episodes)
- Resident Evil (2026 film) – Farmer

== Theatre ==
=== National Theatre (Prague) ===
- Tartuffe Impromptu (2014) – Tartuffe (musical performance)
- Strakonický dudák (2014) – Vocilka
- The Deafening Smell of White (2013) – Vincent van Gogh
- Troilus and Cressida (2012) – Odysseus

=== Divadlo Komedie (Prague) ===
- Kabaret Ivan Blatný (2007) – Man (musical performance)
- Solingen (Rána z milosti) (2004) – Horatio
- Třetí Řím (2004) – Saška
- Ukřižovaná (2004) – Doctor
- The Cannibals (2003) – Klaub, medicine student

=== Divadlo Na zábradlí (Prague) ===
- JE SUiS (2001) – Pastor
- Terasa (2001) – Maurice
- Výnosné místo (2000) – Žadov
- Malý Říjen (1999) – Slovák Juraj Slovák
- Histrionics (1999) – Ferruccio, son
- Ivanov (1998) – Eugene Lvov, young doctor (Alfréd Radok Awards for Best Play)
- Táňa, Táňa (1997) – Ivanov
- Cabaret (1997) – Rudolf Schultz (musical performance)
- The Seagull (1994) – Boris Trigorin, novelist (Alfréd Radok Awards for Best Play)
- Naši Naši furianti (1994) – Filip Dubský
- Pokojíček (1993) – Jiří

=== Kašpar Theatre Company (Prague) ===
- The Green Cockatoo (1992) – Baltasar
- Käthchen of Heilbronn (1992) – Bedřich Veter
- Cyrano de Bergerac (1991) – Christian & De Valvert

=== Nordic Black Theatre (Oslo, Norway) ===
- Mr. Bojangles (1992) – Joe

== Other stage works ==
- Day of the Oprichnik (2013) – Andrej Danilovič (Studio Hrdinů), Alfréd Radok Awards for Best Actor, Cena Divadelních novin for Best Actor, nominated for Thalia Awards for Best Actor
- The Church (L'Église) (2012) – Bardamu & Céline (Studio Hrdinů), nominated for Alfréd Radok Awards for Best Actor
- Richard III (2012) – Duke of Buckingham (Summer Shakespeare Festival)
- Buzní kříž (2012) – Lucrecia (MeetFactory, Prague)
- Vánoční zázrak (2011) – Radan (Divadlo Broadway in Prague, musical performance)
- Kudykam (2009) – Kudykam (Prague State Opera, musical performance)
- Skočná (2009) – Louis-Ferdinand Céline (MeetFactory, Prague)
- Muži malují (2009) – Hubínek (MeetFactory, Prague)
- Horníci (Muži tmy) (2008) – (A Studio Rubín, Prague)
- Jeanne D'Arc (2007) – Judge (Divadlo Miriam, Prague, musical performance)
- Na Fidela mi nesahej! (2007) – Rene Ernesto Ariza (Experimentální prostor NoD - Klub Roxy, Prague)
- The Picture of Dorian Gray (2006) – Lord Henry Wotton (Divadlo TaFantastika, Prague, musical performance)
- In the Penal Colony (2005) – The Condemned Man (Divadlo Archa, Divadlo La Fabrika, Klub Roxy, acting role in opera by Philip Glass)
- Sud prachu (2003) – Policeman & Mane (Činoherní studio Ústí nad Labem)
- E.F.B. - Kladivo na divadlo (2004) – (Divadlo Archa, musical performance)
- King Lear (2002) – Edmund, illegitimate son of Gloucester (Summer Shakespeare Festival)
- Dalibor (2001) – Zdeněk (National Theatre in Prague, acting role in opera by Bedřich Smetana)
- Summit Conference (1991) – Soldier (Divadlo Rokoko, Prague)
