= Talks with TGM =

- Directed by: Jakub Červenka, Martin Huba
- Written by: Pavel Kosatík
- Starring: Jan Budař,
- Cinematography: Jan Malíř
- Release date: 18 October 2018
- Running time: 80 minutes
- Country: Czech Republic
- Language: Czech
- Budget: 13,000,000 CZK
- Box office: 1,914,497 CZK

Talks with TGM (Czech Hovory s TGM) is a 2018 Czech historical film by Jakub Červenka. It premiered 100 years after foundation of Czechoslovakia. It is based on a book of the same name by Karel Čapek. It focuses on the first Czechoslovak president Tomáš Garrigue Masaryk and writer Karel Čapek and their dialogue in 1928.

== Plot ==
The film is set in the fall of 1928 during Karel Čapek's meeting with Tomáš Garrigue Masaryk.

== Cast ==
- Martin Huba as Tomáš Garrigue Masaryk
- Jan Budař as Karel Čapek
- Lucia Siposová
- Roman Luknár
