= Jan Palach (film) =

- Directed by: Robert Sedláček
- Written by: Eva Kantůrková
- Produced by: Silvia Panáková, Erik Panák
- Starring: Viktor Zavadil
- Cinematography: Jan Šuster
- Edited by: Josef Krajbich
- Music by: Michal Rataj
- Production company: Czech Television
- Release dates: 5 August 2018; (Uherské Hradiště Festival); 21 August 2018 (Czech republic)
- Running time: 124 minutes
- Country: Czech Republic
- Language: Czech
- Budget: 45,400,000 CZK
- Box office: 8,258,134 CZK

Jan Palach is a Czech biographical film directed by Robert Sedláček. The film follows Jan Palach during 1968 and 1969 and shows the final 6 months of his life. The film premiered at Uherské Hradiště Summer Film School.

== Plot ==
The film chronicles the life of Jan Palach from childhood until his death in 1969.

The film starts during Palach's childhood. He gets lost in the woods and wanders in snow while his family tries to find him. The film then cuts to 1967 when Palach goes on a student work trip to Kazakhstan. He befriends a young Russian who gets in trouble, but Palach stands up for him against his superior. The Warsaw Pact invasion of Czechoslovakia start when Palach his with his family in Všetaty. He goes to Prague where he participate in street demonstrations. Palach then visits France and learn about the self-immolation of Ryszard Siwiec. Palach returns to Czechoslovakia. He participates in a strike against the invasion and tries to be active. He is soon disappointed with the passiveness of society. He eventually decides to self-immolate himself against the invasion. The film ends with a shot of his burnt face.

== Cast ==
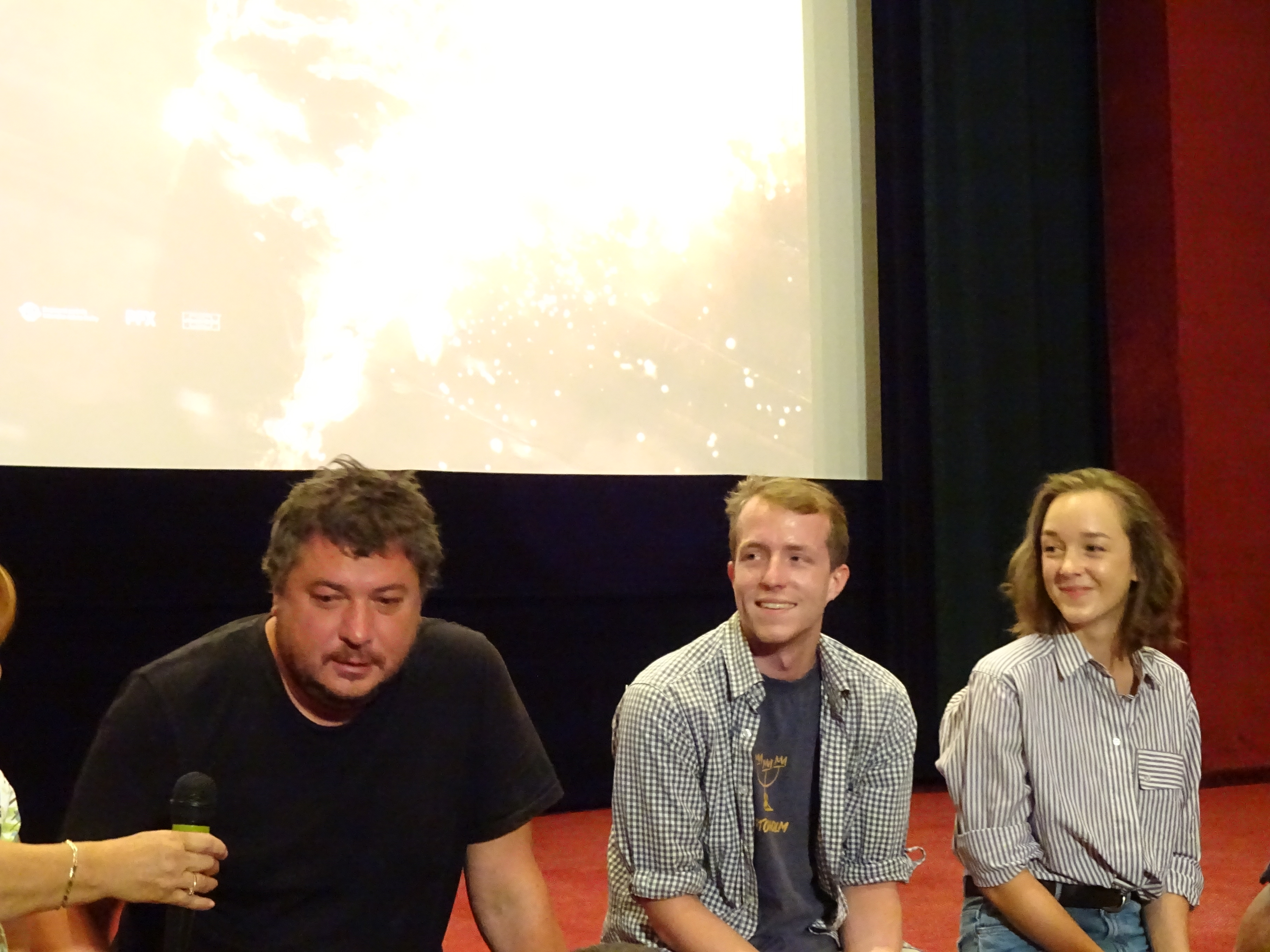
Director and actors

- Viktor Zavadil as Jan Palach
- Zuzana Bydžovská as Libuše Palachová
- Denisa Barešová as Helenka
- Kristína Kanátová as Eva
- Michal Balcar as Jiří Palach
- Karel Jirák as Ladislav Žižka
- Jan Vondráček as Professor
- Jiří Zapletal as Josef Smrkovský
- Daniel Želatý as Jakub Schwarz Trojan
- Gérard Robert Gratadour
- Simone Hrášková
- Patrik Paušo

== Production ==
The film was shot in Prague, Milovice, or Pardubice Square which was used instead of Wenceslas Square. Filmmakers created a scale model of Statue of Saint Wenceslas. Self-immolation was shot with a stuntman at Střešovice. Scenes from a church were shot at Evangelical Church at Libiš that was attended by Palach. Jakub Schwarz Trojan was played by his colleague Daniel Želatý.

== Release ==
The film premiered at Uherské Hradiště Summer Film School on 5 August 2018. It was distributed for cinemas on 21 August 2018. The film was projected in 95 Czech cinemas during the first week after its release. It was attended by 13,129 people and grossed 1,900,000 CZK.

== Reception ==
The film received generally positive reviews from Czech critics. It holds 75% at Kinobox.cz. The film was awarded for 6 Czech Film Critics' Awards.

=== Accolades ===
Date of ceremony	Award	Category	Recipient(s)	Result	Ref(s)
2019	Czech Film Critics' Awards	Best Film		Won	
2019	Czech Film Critics' Awards	Best Director	Robert Sedláček	Nominated	
2019	Czech Film Critics' Awards	Best Screenplay	Eva Kantůrková	Nominated	
2019	Czech Film Critics' Awards	Best Actor	Viktor Zavadil	Nominated	
2019	Czech Film Critics' Awards	Best Actress	Zuzana Bydžovská	Nominated	
2019	Czech Film Critics' Awards	Innogy Award	Viktor Zavadil	Nominated	
2019	Czech Lion Awards	Best Film		Nominated	
2019	Czech Lion Awards	Best Director	Robert Sedláček	Nominated	
2019	Czech Lion Awards	Best Screenplay	Eva Kantůrková	Nominated	
2019	Czech Lion Awards	Best Actor in a Leading Role	Viktor Zavadil	Nominated	
2019	Czech Lion Awards	Best Actress in a Leading Role	Zuzana Bydžovská	Nominated	
2019	Czech Lion Awards	Best Actor in a Supporting Role	Jan Vondráček	Nominated	
2019	Czech Lion Awards	Best Costume Design	Tomáš Chlud	Nominated	
2019	Czech Lion Awards	Best Make up and Hairstyling	Jana Bílková	Nominated	
