= Finále Plzeň Film Festival =

Annual film festival in Czechia

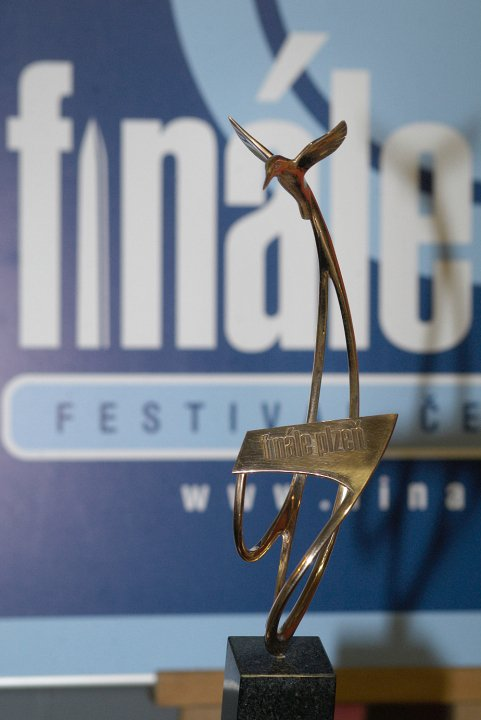
- Golden Kingfisher
- Location: Plzeň, Czech Republic
- Founded: 1968
- Awards: Golden Kingfisher
- No. of films: 40 (2017)
- Website: www.festivalfinale.cz

Finále Plzeň is a film festival based in the Czech Republic. It focuses on Czech feature and documentary films. The best film is awarded the Golden Kingfisher by a jury. It was founded in 1967 and the first year was held in 1968. The festival was held in 1970 but the Golden Kingfisher wasn't awarded. The festival wasn't held again until 1990, when 12 films were awarded the Kingfisher to represent Czech and Slovak cinematography from the 1969-1990 period.

== Awards ==
=== Festival jury ===
Awarded Films:

Golden Kingfisher for the best feature film
| Year | Film title | Director | Country | Source |
|---|---|---|---|---|
| 1968 | Courage for Every Day | Evald Schorm | Czech Socialist Republic | |
| 1969 | All My Compatriots | Vojtěch Jasný | Czech Socialist Republic | |
| 1969 | The Deserter and the Nomads | Juraj Jakubisko | Slovak Socialist Republic | |
| 1991 | The Elementary School | Jan Svěrák | Czech Socialist Republic | |
| 1993 | Horror Story | Jaroslav Brabec | Czech Republic | |
| 1994 | The Cow | Karel Kachyňa | Czech Republic | |
| 1995 | Indian Summer | Saša Gedeon | Czech Republic | |
| 1996 | The Golet in the Valley | Zeno Dostál | Czech Republic | |
| 1997 | Mňága - Happy End | Petr Zelenka | Czech Republic | |
| 1998 | Buttoners | Petr Zelenka | Czech Republic | |
| 1999 | The Idiot Returns | Saša Gedeon | Czech Republic | |
| 2000 | Divided We Fall | Jan Hřebejk | Czech Republic | |
| 2001 | Parallel Worlds | Petr Vaclav | Czech Republic | |
| 2001 | Little Otik | Jan Švankmajer | Czech Republic | |
| 2002 | Autumn Spring | Vladimír Michálek | Czech Republic | |
| 2003 | Pupendo | Jan Hřebejk | Czech Republic | |
| 2004 | Faithless Games | Michaela Pavlátová | Czech Republic | |
| 2005 | The City of the Sun | Martin Šulík | Slovakia | |
| 2006 | Something Like Happiness | Bohdan Sláma | Czech Republic | |
| 2007 | Dolls | Karin Babinská | Czech Republic | |
| 2008 | Little Girl Blue | Alice Nellis | Czech Republic | |
| 2009 | Who's Afraid of the Wolf | Maria Procházková | Czech Republic | |
| 2010 | Kawasakiho růže | Jan Hřebejk | Czech Republic | |
| 2011 | Kooky | Jan Svěrák | Czech Republic | |
| 2011 | Eighty Letters | Václav Kadrnka | Czech Republic | |
| 2012 | The House | Zuzana Liová | Slovakia | |
| 2013 | My Dog Killer | Mira Fornay | Slovakia | |
| 2014 | Like Never Before | Zdeněk Tyc | Czech Republic | |
| 2015 | The Way Out | Petr Vaclav | Czech Republic | |
| 2016 | Family Film | Olmo Omerzu | Czech Republic | |
| 2017 | I, Olga Hepnarová | Tomáš Weinreb, Petr Kazda | Czech Republic | |
| 2018 | The Line | Peter Bebjak | Slovakia | |
| 2019 | Domestique | Adam Sedlák | Czech Republic | |
| 2020 | Let There Be Light | Marko Škop | Slovakia | |
| 2021 | Bad Luck Banging or Loony Porn | Radu Jude | Czech Republic | |
| 2022 | Somewhere Over the Chemtrails | Adam Koloman Rybanský | Czech Republic | |
| 2023 | Brutal Heat | Albert Hospodářský | Czech Republic | |

Kingfishers ex aequo
| Release year | Film title | Director | Country | Source |
|---|---|---|---|---|
| 1969 | Adelheid | František Vláčil | Czech Socialist Republic | |
| 1970 | Case for a Rookie Hangman | Pavel Juráček | Czech Socialist Republic | |
| 1970 | The Sweet Games of Last Summer | Juraj Herz | Slovak Socialist Republic | |
| 1970 | Witchhammer | Otakar Vávra | Czech Socialist Republic | |
| 1977 | Rosy Dreams | Dušan Hanák | Slovak Socialist Republic | |
| 1979 | Prefab Story | Věra Chytilová | Czech Socialist Republic | |
| 1980 | Signum Laudis | Martin Hollý | Czech Socialist Republic; Slovak Socialist Republic | |
| 1983 | The Millennial Bee | Juraj Jakubisko | Slovak Socialist Republic | |
| 1987 | Why? | Karel Smyczek | Czech Socialist Republic | |
| 1990 | The Ear | Karel Kachyňa | Czech Socialist Republic | |
| 1990 | Larks on a String | Jiří Menzel | Czech Socialist Republic | |
| 1990 | Funeral Ceremonies | Zdenek Sirový | Czech Socialist Republic | |

Golden Kingfisher for the best documentary film
| Year | Film title | Director | Source |
|---|---|---|---|
| 2007 | Marcela | Helena Třeštíková | |
| 2008 | Citizen Havel | Pavel Koutecký, Miroslav Janek | |
| 2009 | Česká RAPublika | Pavel Abrahám | |
| 2010 | Land of Destiny | Pavel Kolaja | |
| 2011 | The Hardest of Choices | Dagmar Smržová | |
| 2012 | Love in the Grave | David Vondráček | |
| 2013 | Věra 68 | Olga Sommerová | |
| 2014 | The Great Night | Petr Hátle | |
| 2015 | wave vs. shore | Martin Štrba | |
| 2016 | Under the Sun | Vitaly Mansky | |
| 2017 | 5 October | Martin Kollar | |
| 2021 | A New Shaft | Jindřich Andrš | Czech Republic |
| 2022 | How I Became a Partisan | Vera Lacková | Slovakia; Czech Republic |
| Citizen Miko | Robin Kvapil | Czech Republic | |

Golden Kingfisher for the best documentary film shorter than 30 minutes
| Year | Film title | Director | Source |
|---|---|---|---|
| 2003 | Úžera | Martin Řezníček | |
| 2004 | Jan's Return from the Parisian Exile to Prague in the Summer of 2003¨ | Kateřina Krusová | |
| 2005 | Things | Marta Hrubá | |
| 2006 | Děti z Hartmanic | Lucie Králová | |

Golden Kingfisher for the best documentary film longer than 30 minutes
| Year | Film title | Director | Source |
|---|---|---|---|
| 2003 | Hitler, Stalin a já | Helena Třeštíková | |
| 2004 | Kristova léta, dámy | Tereza Kopáčová | |
| 2005 | Kamenolom boží | Břetislav Rychlík | |
| 2006 | Legenda o ptačím vejci | Zdeněk Novotný Bričkovský | |

Golden Kingfisher for the TV Project and Internet Project - Cyclic Creation
| Year | Film title | Director | Source |
|---|---|---|---|
| 2015 | Tajné životy | Ján Sebechlebský | |
| 2016 | Mamon | Vladimír Michálek | |
| 2017 | Kosmo | Jan Bártek | |

Golden Kingfisher for the TV Project and Internet Project - Non-cyclic Creation
| Year | Film title | Director | Source |
|---|---|---|---|
| 2015 | Je to jen rock'n'roll | Robert Sedláček | |
| 2016 | The Midsummer Wreath | Jiří Strach | |
| 2017 | A Case for a Skier | Lucie Bělohradská | |

Golden Kingfisher for the TV Project - Comedy
| Year | Film title | Director | Source |
|---|---|---|---|
| 2014 | Čtvrtá hvězda | Jan Prušinovský, Miroslav Krobot | |

Golden Kingfisher for the TV Project - Drama
| Year | Film title | Director | Source |

Golden Kingfisher for the TV Project Project - Drama
| Year | Film title | Director | Source |
|---|---|---|---|
| 2014 | Cirkus Bukowsky | Jan Pachl | |

=== Student jury ===
Student jury award for the best feature film
| Year | Film title | Director | Source |
|---|---|---|---|
| 2012 | Nothing Against Nothing | Petr Marek | |
| 2013 | DONT STOP | Richard Řeřicha | |
| 2014 | Like Never Before | Zdeněk Tyc | |
| 2015 | Schmitke | Štěpán Altrichter | |
| 2016 | The Little Man | Radek Beran | |
| 2017 | We Are Never Alone | Petr Vaclav | |

== See also ==
- List of film festivals in the Czech Republic
