= Golden Sting =

- Directed by: Radim Špaček
- Written by: Jakub Bažant; Kristina Nedvědová; Jiří Závozda
- Starring: Filip Březina
- Cinematography: Vladimír Smutný
- Release date: 25 October 2018 (Czech Republic)
- Running time: 106 minutes
- Country: Czech Republic
- Language: Czech
- Budget: 99,914,950 CZK

Golden Sting (Czech: Zlatý podraz) is a 2018 Czech sport romantic drama directed by Radim Špaček.

== Cast ==
- Filip Březina as František Prokeš
- Ondřej Malý as Hrabal
- Stanislav Majer as Valenta
- Patrycja Volny as Michelle
- Zdeněk Piškula as Jan Sedlák
- Jiří Roskot as Emil Jelen
- Chantal Poullain-Polívková
- Andrey Bestchastny as Soviet coach
