= Domestik =

Domestique
- Directed by: Adam Sedlák
- Written by: Adam Sedlák
- Starring: Jiří Konvalinka, Tereza Hofová
- Cinematography: Dušan Husár
- Release dates: 3 July 2018 (Karlovy Vary); 27 September 2018 (Czech Republic)
- Running time: 117 minutes
- Country: Czech Republic
- Language: Czech

Domestique (Czech: Domestik) is a 2018 Czech sport drama directed by Adam Sedlák. It premiered at Karlovy Vary International Film Festival on 1 July 2018.

== Plot ==
The film is about Roman and his wife Šarlota. Roman is a professional biker obsessed with winning. He tries to get in shape after an injury. His wife Šarlota tries to get pregnant but Roman's obsession leads to deterioration of their relationship.

== Cast ==
- Jiří Konvalinka as Roman
- Tereza Hofová as Šarlota
- Miroslav Hanuš as Doctor
- Tomáš Bambusek as Kustod

== Review ==
Hossein Eidizadeh wrote for Kinoscope that "Virtually the entire film happens in Roman’s apartment. For most of the film, we see him cycling madly on an exercise bike; we see the expansion and contraction of his muscles, as if we are following the routines of a laboratory rat under examination. You get so close to Roman and his obsession that, by the end of the film, you are out of breath, as if having cycled for two hours. Sedlák’s first film is visually compelling; he creates an ominous atmosphere in which the only sound heard is Roman’s breathing, his cycle, and the oxygen machine. Šarlota (Tereza Hofová), Roman’s wife, longs for a baby and the presence of the oxygen tent adds another level to this already horrifying story of alienation and makes way for the hard-to-forget ending of this domestic thriller."
