= List of named passenger trains of Europe =

This article contains lists of named passenger trains in Europe, listed by country. Listing by country does eliminate some EuroCity (EC) services from the list, but they are listed on the relevant EuroCity page for daytime trains and the EuroNight (EN) page for nighttime trains. Also separately listed are the named former City Night Line (CNL, 1995–2016) services.

== Austria ==
Train Name	Train Number	Train Operator	Train Endpoints	Operated
CNL Donau Kurier	Discontinued		Vienna (Westbahnhof) – Amsterdam (Centraal)	1995-2016
EN Chopin	EN 406/407		Vienna (Praterstern) – Warsaw (Wschodnia)	present
EC Hortobágy	EC 140/149	MÁV, ÖBB	Budapest (Keleti pu.) – Vienna (Wien Hauptbahnhof)	present
EC Semmelweis	EC 141/148	MÁV, ÖBB	Vienna (Wien Hauptbahnhof) – Budapest (Keleti pu.)	present
EC Liszt Ferenc/Franz Liszt	EC 142/145	MÁV, ÖBB	Budapest (Keleti pu.) – Vienna (Wien Hauptbahnhof)	present
EC Transilvania	EC 143/146	MÁV, ÖBB, CFR	Vienna (Wien Hauptbahnhof) – Budapest (Keleti pu.) – Cluj Napoca	present
EC Csárdás	EC 144/341	MÁV, ÖBB	Budapest (Keleti pu.) – Vienna (Wien Hauptbahnhof)	present
EC Lehár	EC 147/340	MÁV, ÖBB	Vienna (Wien Hauptbahnhof) – Budapest (Keleti pu.)	present
EC Advent	EC 1160/1167	MÁV, ÖBB	Budapest (Keleti pu.) – Vienna (Wien Hauptbahnhof)	present, operates only on Saturdays in the Advent season
EC Mozart	Discontinued	ÖBB	Vienna (Westbahnhof) – Munich (Hauptbahnhof)	now RJ
EC San Marco	Discontinued	ÖBB, Trenitalia	Vienna (Westbahnhof) – Venice (Santa Lucia)	now RJ
EC Transalpin	Discontinued	ÖBB, SBB CFF FFS	Vienna (Westbahnhof) – Basel	1958–2010
EC Transalpin	EC 163/164	ÖBB, SBB CFF FFS	Graz (Hauptbahnhof) – Zürich (Hauptbahnhof)	2013–present
EN Don Giovanni	EN 236/237	ÖBB, Trenitalia	Vienna (Hauptbahnhof) – Venice (Santa Lucia)	now NJ
EN Donau-Spree-Kurier	Discontinued		Vienna (Westbahnhof) – Berlin (Wannsee)	now NJ 456/457, from Vienna (Hauptbahnhof) to Berlin (Charlottenburg)
EN Hans Albers	Discontinued		Vienna (Westbahnhof) – Hamburg (Altona)	now NJ
EN Kalman Imre	EN 462/463		Budapest (Keleti) – Munich (Hauptbahnhof)	present
EN Orient Express	Discontinued	CIWL	Paris (l'Est) – Vienna (Westbahnhof) – Istanbul (Sirkeci)	1883–2009
EN Wiener Walzer	EN 466/467	MÁV, ÖBB, ČD, SBB-CFF-FFS	Budapest (keleti) – Vienna (Südbahnhof) – Prague (Main); Budapest (keleti) – Vienna (Südbahnhof) – Zürich (Hauptbahnhof)	changed to some direct coaches with EN Kálmán Imre, Prague route discontinued, now EN 40467/40462 for Zürich section
EC Avala	EC 344/345		Vienna (Westbahnhof) – Beograd	suspended
Vindobona	rj 70–75 rj 78/79 rj 256/257 rj 370–375	ČD, ÖBB, DB	Graz (Hauptbahnhof) – Wien (Hauptbahnhof) – Prague (Main) – Berlin (Hauptbahnhof)	present

== Belarus ==
Train Name	Train Number	Train Operator	Train Endpoints	Operated
Belarus		RŽD, BŽD	Moscow (Belorussky) – Minsk (Main)	present
Bug		BŽD	Minsk (Main) – Brest	present
Lijetuva		RŽD, BŽD, LG	Moscow (Belorussky) – Minsk (Main) – Vilnius	present
Lybid'		RŽD, BŽD, UZ	St. Petersburg (Vitebsky) – Kyiv (Main)	present
Mayak		RŽD, BŽD, UZ	St. Petersburg (Vitebsky) – Kyiv (Main) – Odesa	present
Minsk		RŽD, BŽD	Moscow (Belorussky) – Minsk (Main)	present
Polonez		RŽD, BŽD, PKP	Moscow (Belorussky) – Minsk (Main) – Warsaw (Zachodnia)	present
Sibirjak		DB, PKP, BŽD, RŽD, KTŽ	Berlin (Hauptbahnhof) – Adler; Berlin (Hauptbahnhof) – Astana; Berlin (Hauptbahnhof) – Chelyabinsk; Berlin (Hauptbahnhof) – Kazan; Berlin (Hauptbahnhof) – Moscow (Belorussky); Berlin (Hauptbahnhof) – Novosibirsk; Berlin (Hauptbahnhof) – St. Petersburg (Vitebsky); Berlin (Hauptbahnhof) – Ufa	discontinued
Slavyansky Express		RŽD, BŽD	Moscow (Belorussky) – Minsk (Main)	present
Sozh		RŽD, BŽD	Moscow (Belorussky) – Gomel	present
Svisloch		RŽD, BŽD	Moscow (Belorussky) – Minsk (Main)	present
Vostok-Zapad Express		RŽD, BŽD, PKP	Moscow (Belorussky) – Minsk (Main) – Warsaw (Zachodnia)	present
Yantar (Amber)		RŽD, BŽD	Moscow (Belorussky) – Minsk (Main) – Kaliningrad	present
Zvezda		RŽD, BŽD	St. Petersburg (Vitebsky) – Minsk (Main)	present

== Belgium ==
Train Name	Train Number	Train Operator	Train Endpoints	Operated
Eurostar		NMBS/SNCB, SNCF	Brussels (Brussel-Zuid) or Paris (Gare du Nord) to London (St Pancras)	1994–present

== Bulgaria ==
Train Name	Train Number	Train Operator	Train Endpoints	Operated
Chaika			Sofia (Central) – Karlovo – Bourgas	present
Slynchev Briag			Sofia (Central) – Plovdiv – Bourgas	present
Zlatni Pyasatsi			Sofia (Central) – Varna	present
Yantra			Sofia (Central) – Gorna Oriahovitsa	present
Diana			Sofia (Central) – Yambol	present
Bulgaria Express			Sofia (Central) – Moscow (Kiyevsky)	present
Cherno More			Varna – Minsk	present

== Croatia ==
Train Name	Train Number	Train Operator	Train Endpoints	Operated
Marjan	IC 520/521/522/523	HŽPP	Zagreb (Central) – Knin – Split	present (until 1991 on Una railway, since 1995 on Lika railway)
Dalmacija		HŽPP	Čakovec – Varaždin – Zagreb – Split	present
Mimara	EC 212 / 112; EC 113 / 1213	HŽPP	Zagreb (Central) – Frankfurt (Hbf)	present
Dioklecijan		HŽPP	Osijek – Split	present
Opatija	B 480 / B 481 1247 / 1246 / 1605	HŽPP, SŽ, MAV	Rijeka – Ljubljana – Munich / Budapest Déli	present
Istra	B 1272	HŽPP	Pula – Buzet – Divača	present
Lisinski	EN 498 / 462, EN 463 / 499	HŽPP	Zagreb (Central) – Salzburg – Munich (Hbf)	present
Sava	B210	HŽPP	Vinkovci – Villach	present
Croatia	EC* 158 R / EC* 159/1259** R	HŽPP	Zagreb (Central) – Vienna	present
Slavonija	IC 540/541/543/544	HŽPP	Vinkovci – Zagreb	present
Cibalija	IC 542/545	HŽPP	Vinkovci – Zagreb	present
Podravka	IC 580/581	HŽPP	Osijek – Koprivnica – Zagreb	present
Drava	B 1272	HŽPP	Osijek – Koprivnica – Zagreb	present
Gradec	IC** 200 /205	HŽPP, MAV	Zagreb – Budapest Déli	present
Agram	IC** 201 /204	HŽPP, MAV	Zagreb – Budapest Déli	present
Matoš		JŽ	Zagreb – Belgrade	-1991
Arena		JŽ	Pula – Ljubljana	-1991?

== Czech Republic ==
Train Name	Train Number	Train Operator	Train Endpoints	Operated
Báthory	EC 130/131	ČD, ZSSK, MÁV-START, PKPIC	Budapest (Nyugati) – Terespol	present (2021)
Berliner	EC 170/171 EC 174–179 EC 378/379 RJ 382-384	ČD, DB, DSB	Prague (Main) – Berlin (Hauptbahnhof) Prague (Main) – Berlin (Hauptbahnhof) – Hamburg (Altona) Prague (Main) – Berlin (Hauptbahnhof) – Hamburg (Hauptbahnof) – Kiel (Hauptbahnhof) Prague (Main) – Berlin (Hauptbahnhof) – Hamburg (Hauptbahnof) – Copenhagen (Central)	present
Berounka	Sp 1700/1701 Sp 1703 Sp 1706 Sp 1708 R 750–779	ČD	Sp: Rokycany – Klatovy R: Prague (Main) – Plzeň – Klatovy – Železná Ruda-Alžbětín	present
Bezdrev	R 657–659	ČD	Plzeň – České Budějovice	present
Bouzov	R 900-917	ČD	Brno (Main) – Olomouc – Šumperk	present
Brněnský drak	rj 572/573 rj 576	ČD	Brno (Main) – Prague (Main)	present
Budvar	IC 540/541	ČD	Prague (Main) – České Budějovice	present
Chopin	IC 406/407	ČD, PKPIC	Bohumín – Warsaw (Wschodnia)	present
Cracovia	EC 114/115	ČD, PKPIC	Przemysl – Prague (Main)	present
Cvilín	R 1320/1321	ČD	Ostrava (střed) – Krnov	present
Cyklo Brdy	Sp 1596/1597	ČD	Prague (Main) – Blatná	present
Český ráj	Sp 1488/1489	ČD	Prague (Masarykovo) – Turnov	present
Dny NATO	Ex 1310/1311 rj 1312/1313 R 1314/1345	ČD	Mošnov, Ostrava Airport – Olomouc Mošnov, Ostrava Airport – Prague (Main) Mošnov, Ostrava Airport – Brno (Main)	present
Donau-Moldau	Sp 3800-3806 (even numbers only)	ČD, ÖBB	Linz (Hauptbahnhof) – České Budějovice (only in this direction)	present
Excelsior	R 440/441	ČD	Cheb – Košice (Main)	until 2014
Expres Pálava-Podyjí	Sp 1749/1750	ČD	Brno (Královo Pole) – Brno (Main) – Šatov	present
Fatran	R 340–347	ČD, ZSSK	Ostrava (Svinov) – Žilina – Vrútky – Banská Bystrica – Zvolen	present
Galicja	R 300/301	ČD, PKPIC	Przemysl – Ostrava (Svinov)	present
Helfštýn	Ex 590/591	ČD	Bohumín – Břeclav	present
Horácký express	Sp 1925–1928	ČD	Brno (Main) – Třebíč	present
Hradečan	R 936/937 R 940–955	ČD	Prague (Main) – Hradec Králové – Letohrad	present
Hukvaldy	R 640/641	ČD	Prague (Main) – Bohumín	present
Humprecht	Sp 1821/1822	ČD	Hradec Králové – Sobotka	present
Hungaria	EC 172/173	ČD, ZSSK, MÁV-START, DB	Budapest (Nyugati) – Hamburg (Altona)	present
Jan Perner	R 899	ČD	Prague (Main) – Pardubice	present
Javořina	Sp 1776	ČD	Brno (Main) – Vlárský průsmyk	present
Jihava	R 650	ČD	Brno (Main) – Jihlava	present
Jiří Bouda	IC 571	ČD	Prague (Main) – Brno (Main)	present
Jizera	Sp 1540–1547	ČD	Prague (Masarykovo) – Mladá Boleslav (Main) – Mladá Boleslav (Town) Prague (Masarykovo) – Mladá Boleslav (Main) – Turnov	present
Jižní expres	EC 330–337 Ex 530/531 Ex 536/537 Ex 544/545 IC 532–535 IC 538/539 IC 542/543	ČD, ÖBB	Prague (Holešovice) – Prague (Main) – České Budějovice – Linz (Hauptbahnhof) Ex 536/537: Prague (Main) – České Budějovice – Český Krumlov	present
Karel Čapek		ČD	Nuremberg (Main) – Prague (Main)	until 2017
Kokořínský rychlík	R 1272/1273	KŽC	Prague (Vršovice) – Mšeno	present
Krakonoš	R 920–934	ČD	Prague (Main) – Trutnov	present
Krušnohor	R 601–620	ČD	Prague (Main) – Ústí nad Labem – Teplice v Čechách – Chomutov – Cheb	present
Labe	R 600 R 670–699	ČD	Prague (Main) – Ústí nad Labem – Děčín	present
Leo Express	LE 410/411 LE 1230–1262	LE	Prague (Main) – Kraków (Main) Prague (Main) – Bohumín – Karviná Prague (Main) – Bohumín – Košice Prague (Main) – Bohumín – Přerov Prague (Main) – Bohumín – Staré Město u Uherského Hradiště	present
Letní Kometa	Os 5274/5275	ČD	Ústí nad Labem – Dresden (Hauptbahnhof)	present
Lužickohorský rychlík	R 1274/1275	KŽC	Prague (Main) – Mikulášovice	present
Lužnice	R 704-737 (only selected)	ČD	Prague (Holešovice) – Prague (Main) – České Velenice	present
Metropol	EN 476/477 IC 574/575	ČD, ZSSK, MÁV-START	Prague (Main) – Břeclav – Budapest (Keleti)	present
Metropolitan	EC 270–281	ČD, ZSSK, MÁV-START	Prague (Main) – Brno (Main) – Budapest (Nyugati)	present
Metropolitan Slovenská strela	EC 282–285	ČD, ZSSK	Prague (Main) – Bratislava (Main) – Nové Zámky	present
Moravan	R 800–821 Sp 821/834	ČD	Brno (Main) – Břeclav – Olomouc	present
Moravia	EC 100/101	ČD, ÖBB, PKPIC	Wien (Hauptbahnhof) – Katowice	present
Opavan	IC 513/514	ČD	Prague (Main) – Opava (Východ)	present
Ostravan	EC 144/145 Ex 140–143 Ex 548/549 IC 508 IC 511 IC 514–519 IC 1300/1301	ČD, ZSSK	Prague (Main) – Ostrava (Main) – Bohumín – Návsí – Žilina	present
Pendolino	IC 512/515 SC 500–517	ČD	Karlovy Vary – Františkovy Lázně – Prague (Main) – Ostrava (Main) – Bohumín	present
Pendolino Košičan	SC 240–243	ČD, ZSSK	Prague (Main) – Košice	present
Pernštejn	Sp 1780/1781	ČD	Brno (Main) – Žďár nad Sázavou	present
Podlipanský motoráček	Os 18300–18313	KŽC	Pečky – Bošice – Kouřim – Zásmuky – Bečváry	present
Polonia	EC 102/103	ČD, ÖBB, PKPIC	Wien (Hauptbahnhof) – Warsaw (Wschodnia)	present
Porta Bohemica	Ex 578/579	ČD	Prague (Main) – Děčín	present
Porta Moravica	EC 104/105	ČD, ÖBB, PKPIC	Graz (Hauptbahnhof) – Przemysl	present
Posázavský motoráček	Sp 1282–1285	KŽC	Prague (Main) – Čerčany	present
Praděd	R 1322–1335	ČD	Ostrava (střed) – Ostrava (Svinov) – Krnov – Olomouc	present
Pražský motoráček	Os 7550–7599	KŽC	Prague (Čakovice) – Prague (Main) – Prague (Zličín)	present
Přerovský zubr	IC 524/525	ČD	Prague (Main) – Přerov	present
Radhošť	Sp 1783/1784	ČD	Brno (Main) – Frenštát pod Radhoštěm	present
Rakovnický rychlík	R 1270/1271	KŽC	Prague (Main) – Rakovník	present
Regiojet	RJ 1000–1051	RJ	Prague (Main) – Brno (Main) – Bratislava (Main) Prague (Main) – Brno (Main) – Vienna (Hauptbahnhof) – Budapest (Déli) Prague (Main) – Opava (East) Prague (Main) – Havířov – Návsí – Košice	present
Renesance	Sp 1900–1923	ČD	Havlíčkův Brod – Telč – Slavonice	present
Roztocze	R 310/311	ČD, PKPIC	Lublin – Bohumín	present
Rožmberk	R 651–656 R 660–669	ČD	Plzeň – České Budějovice – Jihlava – Brno (Main)	present
Ryzlink rýnský	Sp 1931/1932	ČD	Jihlava – Znojmo	present
Sauvignon	Sp 1934/1935	ČD	Jihlava – Znojmo	present
Sázava	Sp 1500–1511	ČD	Prague (Main) – Benešov u Prahy – Olbramovice – Tábor	present
Silesia	EC 116/117 Ex 112/113 IC 110/111	ČD, PKPIC	Warsaw (Wschodnia) – Ostrava (Svinov) – Prague (Main)	present
Slovácký express	R 858 R 880–889 R 891–893 R 895/896	ČD	Prague (Smíchov) – Prague (Main) – Olomouc – Staré Město u Uherského Hradiště – Veselí nad Moravou Prague (Smíchov) – Prague (Main) – Olomouc – Staré Město u Uherského Hradiště – Luhačovice	present
Slovakia	EN 442/443	ČD, ZSSK	Prague (Main) – Žilina	present
Sobieski	EC 106/107	ČD, ÖBB, PKPIC	Wien (Hauptbahnhof) – Gdynia (Main)	present
Střekov	R 780–795	ČD	Kolín – Ústí nad Labem	present
Svitava	R 860–879	ČD	Prague (Smíchov) – Prague (Main) – Česká Třebová – Brno (Main)	present
Třebovka	R 877	ČD	Prague (Smíchov) – Česká Třebová	present
Valašský expres	Ex 120–129 Ex 220/221 Ex 520–523	ČD, ZSSK	Prague (Main) – Vsetín – Púchov – Žilina	present
Vánoční Kometa	Os 5276/5277	ČD	Ústí nad Labem – Dresden (Hauptbahnhof)	present
Veltlínské zelené	Sp 1930/1933	ČD	Jihlava – Znojmo	present
Vindobona	rj 70–75 rj 78/79 rj 256/257 rj 370–375	ČD, ÖBB, DB	Graz (Hauptbahnhof) – Wien (Hauptbahnhof) – Prague (Main) – Berlin (Hauptbahnhof)	present
Vltava	R 700–734 (except several Lužnice trains)	ČD	Prague (Holešovice) – Prague (Main) – Tábor – České Budějovice	present (from 2017)
Vltava	EN 404/405	ČD	Moscow (Belorussky) – Prague (Main)	until 2017
Vltava-Dunaj	Sp 3801-3807 (odd numbers only)	ČD, ÖBB	České Budějovice – Linz (Hauptbahnhof) (only in this direction)	present
Vrchlice	Sp 1520–1529	ČD	Prague (Main) – Kutná Hora	present
Vysočina	R 960–967 R 970–991	ČD	Prague (Smíchov) – Prague (Main) – Čáslav – Havlíčkův Brod – Žďár nad Sázavou – Brno (Main) R 960/961: Prague (Smíchov) – Prague (Main) – Čáslav – Havlíčkův Brod – Jihlava	present
Západní express	Ex 350–363 Ex 550–568	ČD, ALEX	Prague (Main) – Plzeň – München (Hauptbahnhof) Prague (Main) – Plzeň – Cheb	present
Zlínský express	R 894/897	ČD	Prague (Smíchov) – Zlín (middle)	present

== Finland ==
Train Name	Train Number	Train Operator	Train Endpoints	Operated
Arctic Express		Canterbury Travel	Rovaniemi – Kemijärvi	2007 - 2008
Allegro	AE 781 ... AE 788	Karelian Trains	Helsinki (Central) – St. Petersburg (Finlyandsky)	2010 - 2022
Aurora Borealis Express	269 (northbound); 270 (southbound)	VR Group	Helsinki (Central) – Kolari	present
Botnia Express		VR Group	Helsinki (Central) – Vaasa	1983 - 1988
Centria		VR Group	Helsinki (Central) – Jyväskylä	1978 - 1980, 1986 - 1989
Ilya Repin	P 33 / 34	RŽD	Helsinki (Central) – St. Petersburg (Finlyandsky)	1982 - 2010
Imatra Express	EXP 17 / EXP 18	VR Group	Helsinki (Central) – Imatra	1985 - 1988
Karelia		VR Group	Helsinki (Central) – Joensuu	1972 - 1992
Lapponia	EP 57 / EP 58	VR Group	Helsinki (Central) – Oulu	1972 - 1994
Lev Tolstoi	P 31/ P 32	RŽD	Helsinki (Central) – Moscow (Leningradsky)	1982 - 2020
Polaria	EP 53 / EP 54	VR Group	Helsinki (Central) – Oulu	1972 - 1979
Santa Claus Express		VR Group	Helsinki (Central) – Rovaniemi	until 2010
Savonia		VR Group	Helsinki (Central) – Kontiomäki	1972 - 1993
Sibelius	P 35 / 36	VR Group	Helsinki (Central) – St. Petersburg (Finlyandsky)	1992 - 2010

== France ==
Train Name	Train Number	Train Operator	Train Endpoints	Operated
Le Capitole	Discontinued	SNCF	Paris (Austerlitz) – Toulouse	Until September 1991
Caravaggio	9240/9249	SNCF, Trenitalia	Paris (Lyon) – Turin – Milan (Central)	Until December 2011
Catalán Talgo	70/71	Elipsos	Montpellier (Saint-Roch) – Barcelona (Estació de França)	Until 2010
Côte d'Azur Pullman Express	Discontinued	PLM	Paris (Lyon) – Ventimiglia	1929–1939
EC Dumas	EC 9242/9247	SNCF, Trenitalia	Paris (Lyon) – Turin – Milan (Central)	present
L'Étendard	Discontinued	SNCF	Paris (Austerlitz) – Bordeaux	Until 1990
EC Iris	Discontinued	SBB, SNCF, SNCB	Brussels (Midi/Zuid) – Strasbourg – Chur	
EC Jean Monnet	Discontinued	SBB, SNCF, SNCB	Brussels (Midi/Zuid) – Strasbourg – Basel	present
EC Vauban	EC 90/91	SBB, SNCF, SNCB	Brussels (Midi/Zuid) – Strasbourg – Brig	present
Flèche d'Or	Discontinued	CF du Nord, SNCF	Calais – Paris (Nord)	1925–1972
Le Train Bleu (The Blue Train)	Discontinued	SNCF	Calais – French Riviera	1886–2003, replaced with ICN 5771/5772 or 5773/5774
Ligure		SNCF, Trenitalia	Nice – Milan (Central)	present
EC Manzoni	EC 50/51	SNCF, Trenitalia	Paris (Lyon) – Turin – Milan (Central)	present
Le Mistral	Discontinued	SNCF	Paris (Lyon) – Nice	1950–1982
Montecarlo		SNCF, Trenitalia	Nice – Naples	present
Nord Express		SNCF, NMBS/SNCB, NS, DRB, DSB, PKP, BŽD, LD, RŽD	Paris (Nord) – St. Petersburg (Vitebsky); Paris (Nord) – Warsaw (Gdańska); Paris (Nord) – Copenhagen (Central); Paris (Nord) – Hamburg (Hauptbahnhof)	1896–1914; 1918–1936; 1945–2007; 2007–present
Orient Express	Discontinued	CIWL	Strasbourg (Gare de Strasbourg) – Vienna (Westbahnhof) – Istanbul (Sirkeci)	1883–2009
Palatino Express	EC 212/213	Thello	Paris (Lyon) – Bologna (Central) – Florence (Santa Maria Novella) – Rome (Termini)	1890–2013 (originally Rome Express)
EC Riviera dei Fiori	EC 139/140 EC 159/160	SNCF, Trenitalia	Nice – Milan (Central)	present
Rome Express		CIWL	Calais to Rome, later Paris to Rome	1890–1969; then renamed Palatino Express (see above)
EC Sanremo	EC 143–146	SNCF, Trenitalia	Nice – Milan (Central)	present
EC Stendahl	EC 220/221	SNCF, Trenitalia	Paris (Lyon) – Milan (Central) – Venice (Santa Lucia)	present
Sud Express	310/313	CP, Renfe, SNCF	Lisbon (Santa Apolónia) – Irun – Hendaye – Paris (Austerlitz); Lisbon (Santa Apolónia) – Irun / Hendaye	1896–1990; 1990–2020
Talgo Mare Nostrum		Elipsos	Montpellier (Saint-Roch) – Valencia – Lorca	Withdrawn
Tren de los Alpes		Elipsos	Bourg-Saint-Maurice – Madrid (Chamartín)	Withdrawn
Trenhotel Francisco de Goya	EN 406/409	Elipsos	Paris (d'Austerlitz) – Madrid (Chamartín)	Withdrawn
Trenhotel Joan Miró	EN 474/477	Elipsos	Paris (d'Austerlitz) – Barcelona (Estació de França)	Withdrawn

== Germany ==
Train Name	Train Number	Train Operator	Train Endpoints	Operated
Allersberg-Express		DB Regio	Nuremberg (Hauptbahnhof) – Allersberg	2006–present
Bavaria		DB, SBB-CFF-FFS	Munich (Hauptbahnhof) – Zurich (Hauptbahnhof)	1969–2002
Berlin-Warszawa-Express	EC 40–49	DB, PKP	Berlin (Hauptbahnhof) - Poznań (Główny) - Warsaw (Wschodnia)	2002–present
Blauer Enzian		DB, ÖBB	Hamburg-Altona – Klagenfurt	1965–present (unnamed since the 1990s)
CNL Copernicus	CNL 457/455	DB AutoZug	Amsterdam Centraal – Prague	Withdrawn
Helvetia		DB, SBB-CFF-FFS	Hamburg-Altona – Zurich	1957–1979
Hungaria			Budapest (Nyugati) – Hamburg (Hauptbahnhof)	present
Karel Čapek	R 350 / 353		Nuremberg (Hauptbahnhof) – Prague Praha-Holešovice railway station	Discontinued
Franz Kafka	R 354 / 357		Munich (Hauptbahnhof) – Prague Praha-Holešovice railway station	present
Karwendel			Berlin (Hauptbahnhof) – Garmisch-Partenkirchen	present
TEE Merkur	TEE 34/35	DB, DSB	København – Stuttgart	1974–1978
EC Merkur	EC 30/31	DB, DSB	København – Frankfurt	1987–1991
München-Nürnberg-Express		DB Regio	Munich (Hauptbahnhof) – Nuremberg (Hauptbahnhof)	2006–present
Norddeich Mole		DB	Luxembourg – Norddeich Mole	present
Rheingold		DRG, DB	Basel – Hook of Holland/Amsterdam	1928–1987
Rhyhas	S62	SBB GmbH	Schaffhausen – Singen (– Radolfzell)	2022–present
Seehas	S6	SBB GmbH	Engen – Konstanz	1994–present
Seehäsle	S61	SWEG	Radolfzell – Stockach	1996–present
TEE Rheinpfeil	TEE 21/22	DB	Dortmund – Köln (Cologne) – München	1965–1971
IC Rheinpfeil	IC 106/107	DB	Hannover – Köln (Cologne) – München. After May 1979: Hamburg/Hannover – Köln (Cologne) – Basel	1971–1987
EC Rheinpfeil	EC 8/9	DB	Hannover – Köln (Cologne) – Chur	1987–1991
Sibirjak		DB, PKP, BŽD, RŽD, KTŽ	Berlin (Hauptbahnhof) – Adler; Berlin (Hauptbahnhof) – Astana; Berlin (Hauptbahnhof) – Chelyabinsk; Berlin (Hauptbahnhof) – Kazan; Berlin (Hauptbahnhof) – Moscow (Belorussky); Berlin (Hauptbahnhof) – Novosibirsk; Berlin (Hauptbahnhof) – St. Petersburg (Vitebsky); Berlin (Hauptbahnhof) – Ufa	until 2013
Vindobona	rj 256/257	Historic: DR (1957 - 1990) DB (since 1990), ÖBB, ČSD From 2019: ČD, ÖBB, DB	Past: Hamburg-Altona – Praha – Wien – Villach From 2019: Graz (Hauptbahnhof) – Wien (Hauptbahnhof) – Prague (Main) – Berlin (Hauptbahnhof)	1957–2014, 2019–present

== Greece ==
Train Name	Train Number	Train Operator	Train Endpoints	Operated
Pavlos Melas (Παύλος Μελάς)	IC 60/66	OSE	Athens – Kozani	Discontinued
Pella (Πέλλα)	IC 80/81	OSE	Thessaloniki – Kozani	Discontinued
Pegasus (Πήγασος)	IC 30/31	OSE	Volos – Thessaloniki	Discontinued
Vergina (Βεργίνα)	IC 70/71	OSE	Athens – Alexandroupolis	Discontinued
N. Plastiras (Ν. Πλαστήρας)	IC 47/48	OSE	Athens – Kalabaka	Discontinued
Rigas Ferraios (Ρήγας Φεραίος)	IC 40/41	OSE	Athens – Volos	Discontinued
Filippos (Φίλιππος)		OSE	Athens – Thessaloniki	Discontinued
Makedonia (Μακεδονία)	ICE 50/51	OSE	Athens – Thessaloniki	Discontinued
Periklis (Περικλής)		OSE	Athens – Volos	Discontinued
Ermis (Ερμής)	IC 52/53	OSE	Athens – Thessaloniki	Present
Orfeas (Ορφέας)	IC 74/75	OSE	Athens – Komotini	Discontinued
Alexandros (Αλέξανδρος)	ICE 56/57	OSE	Athens – Thessaloniki	Discontinued
Aristotelis (Αριστοτέλης)	IC 54/55	OSE	Athens – Thessaloniki	Discontinued
Aiolos (Αίολος)		OSE	Athens – Thessaloniki	Discontinued
Akropolis Express	290/291	OSE	Athens – Munich (Hauptbahnhof)	Discontinued
Αttika Express	210/211	OSE	Athens – Munich (Hauptbahnhof)	Discontinued

== Hungary ==
Train Name	Train Number	Train Operator	Train Endpoints	Operated
EC Báthory	EC 130/131	MÁV, ZSSK, ČD, PKP	Budapest (Nyugati pu.) – Bratislava (hl.st.) – Ostrava (hl.n.) – Warsaw (Centralna) – Terespol	present
EC Hortobágy	EC 140/149	MÁV, ÖBB	Záhony – Nyíregyháza – Debrecen – Budapest (Keleti pu.) – Vienna (Wien Hauptbahnhof)	present
EC Semmelweis	EC 141/148	MÁV, ÖBB	Vienna (Wien Hauptbahnhof) – Budapest (Keleti pu.)	present
EC Liszt Ferenc/Franz Liszt	EC 142/145	MÁV, ÖBB	Budapest (Keleti pu.) – Vienna (Wien Hauptbahnhof)	present
EC Transilvania	EC 143/146	MÁV, ÖBB, CFR	Vienna (Wien Hauptbahnhof) – Budapest (Keleti pu.) – Cluj Napoca	present
EC Csárdás	EC 144/341	MÁV, ÖBB	Budapest (Keleti pu.) – Vienna (Wien Hauptbahnhof)	present
EC Lehár	EC 147/340	MÁV, ÖBB	Vienna (Wien Hauptbahnhof) – Budapest (Keleti pu.)	present
EC Advent	EC 1160/1167	MÁV, ÖBB	Budapest (Keleti pu.) – Vienna (Wien Hauptbahnhof)	present, operates only on Saturdays in the Advent season
EC Hungaria	EC 172/173	MÁV, ZSSK, ČD, DB	Budapest (Nyugati pu.) – Bratislava (hl.st.) – Prague (Praha hl.n.) – Berlin (Berlin Hauptbahnhof) – Hamburg (Hamburg Hauptbahnhof)	present
EC Metropolitan	EC 270/271, EC 272/273, EC 274/275, EC 276/277, EC 278/279, EC 280/281	MÁV, ZSSK, ČD	Budapest (Nyugati pu.) – Bratislava (hl.st.) – Prague (Praha hl.n.)	present
EC Szamos	EC 686/687	MÁV, CFR	Püspökladány – Debrecen – Baia Mare	present
EN Kálmán Imre	EN 462/463	MÁV, ÖBB, DB	Budapest (Keleti pu.) – Vienna (Wien Hauptbahnhof) – Munich (München Hauptbahnhof)	present
EN Metropol	EN 476/477	MÁV, ZSSK, ČD	Budapest (Keleti pu.) – Bratislava (hl.st.) – Břeclav	present
NIC Latorca	NIC 33/34	MÁV, UZ	Budapest (Nyugati pu.) – Szolnok – Debrecen – Nyíregyháza – Mukachevo	present
NIC Traianus	NIC 72/73	MÁV, CFR	Bucharest (Bucureşti Nord)) – Timișoara (Timișoara Nord) – Arad – Békéscsaba – Szolnok – Budapest (Keleti pu.)	present
NIC Fogaras	NIC 74/75	MÁV, CFR	Braşov – Arad – Békéscsaba – Szolnok – Budapest (Keleti pu.)	present
NIC Muntenia	NIC 78/79	MÁV, CFR	Bucharest (Bucureşti Nord)) – Timișoara (Timișoara Nord) – Arad – Békéscsaba – Szolnok – Budapest (Keleti pu.)	present
NIC Hernád	NIC 182/189 NIC 190/199 NIC 192/187 NIC 184/197 NIC 194/195 NIC 186/193 NIC 188/191	MÁV, ZSSK	Budapest (Keleti pu.) – Miskolc (Tiszai pu.) – Košice	present
NIC Agram	NIC 201/204	MÁV, HŽ	Koprivnica – Fonyód – Székesfehérvár – Budapest (Déli pu.)	present
NIC Citadella	NIC 246/247	MÁV, SŽ	Budapest (Déli pu.) – Székesfehérvár – Veszprém – Zalaegerszeg – Ljubljana	present
NIC Dráva	NIC 310/311	MÁV, GySEV, ÖBB, SŽ	Budapest (Keleti pu.) – Győr – Szombathely – Graz (Graz Hauptbahnhof) – Maribor – Celje – Ljubljana	present
NIC Mura	NIC 312/313	MÁV, GySEV, ÖBB	Graz (Graz Hauptbahnhof) – Szombathely – Győr – Budapest (Keleti pu.)	present
NIC Rába	NIC 317/318	MÁV, GySEV, ÖBB	Graz (Graz Hauptbahnhof) – Szombathely – Győr – Budapest (Keleti pu.)	discontinued
IC Arrabona	IC 989	MÁV	Győr – Budapest (Keleti pu.)	present
IC Savaria	IC 922/929 IC 924/927 IC 934/937 IC 926/925 IC 928/923 IC 938/921	MÁV, GySEV	Budapest (Keleti pu.) – Győr – Csorna – Szombathely – Szentgotthárd*	present
IC Tűztorony	IC 982/993	MÁV, GySEV	Budapest (Keleti pu.) – Győr – Csorna – Sopron	present
IC Ikva	IC 981/992	MÁV, GySEV	Budapest (Keleti pu.) – Győr – Csorna – Sopron	present
IC Lővér	IC 983/984	MÁV, GySEV	Budapest (Keleti pu.) – Győr – Csorna – Sopron	present
IC Scarbantia	IC 987/994	MÁV, GySEV	Budapest (Keleti pu.) – Győr – Csorna – Sopron	present
IC Kékfrankos	IC 986/995	MÁV, GySEV	Budapest (Keleti pu.) – Győr – Csorna – Sopron	present
IC Soproni Közgáz	IC 996/997	MÁV, GySEV	Budapest (Keleti pu.) – Győr – Csorna – Sopron	present
IC Magnet Bank	IC 985/988	MÁV, GySEV	Budapest (Keleti pu.) – Győr – Csorna – Sopron	present
NIC Hargita	NIC 366/367	MÁV, CFR	Braşov – Cluj Napoca – Oradea – Püspökladány – Szolnok – Budapest (Keleti pu.)	present
NIC Corona	NIC 406/407	MÁV, CFR	Braşov – Cluj Napoca – Oradea – Püspökladány – Szolnok – Budapest (Keleti pu.)	present
NIC Ister	NIC 472/473	MÁV, CFR	Bucharest (Bucureşti Nord)) – Braşov – Arad – Békéscsaba – Szolnok – Budapest (Keleti pu.)	present
Ivo Andrić	342/343	MÁV, SV	Subotica – Budapest (Keleti pu.)	suspended due to the construction works of the Budapest-Belgrád line; replacement by international bus
Dacia	Gy 346/347	MÁV, ÖBB, CFR	Bucharest (Bucureşti Nord)) – Budapest (Keleti pu.) – Vienna (Wien Hauptbahnhof); between Vienna – Szolnok: merged with Corvin named as Dacia-Corvin	present
Corvin	Gy 404/405	MÁV, ÖBB, CFR	Szolnok – Püspökladány – Cluj-Napoca	present
IR Helikon	IR 9600/9609 IR 9690/9697 (IR 19697) IR 9602/9607 IR 9604/9605 IR 9694/9695 (IR 19695) IR 9603/9606 IR 9693/9696 (IR 19696) IR 9601/9608	MÁV	Győr* – Pápa* – Celldömölk* – Tapolca* – Keszthely* – Fonyód – Kaposvár – Pécs*	present
IR Pannónia	IR 8900/9807 IR 8902/8907 IR 8992/8997 IR 8904/8905 IR 8994/8995 IR 8903/8906 IR 8993/8996 IR 8901/9808	MÁV, GySEV	Szombathely – Nagykanizsa – Barcs* – Pécs*	present
IC Bakony	IC 900/909 IC 902/907 IC 904/905 IC 9004/9005 IC 9003/9006 IC 903/906 IC 901/908 IC 918	MÁV, GySEV	Budapest (Déli pu.) – Székesfehérvár – Veszprém – Ajka – Szombathely*	present
IC Göcsej	IC 950/959 IC 952/957 IC 954/967 IC 955 IC 964 IC 953/956 IC 963/966 IC 951/958	MÁV, GySEV	Budapest (Déli pu.) – Székesfehérvár – Veszprém – Ajka – Zalaegerszeg	present
NIC Citadella	NIC 246/247	MÁV, GySEV, ÖBB, SŽ	Budapest (Déli pu.) – Székesfehérvár – Veszprém – Ajka – Zalaegerszeg – Hodos – Murska Sobota – Ptuj – Celje – Ljubljana	present
NEx Istria	NEx 1246/1247	MÁV, GySEV, ÖBB, SŽ	Ajka* – Zalaegerszeg – Hodos – Murska Sobota – Ptuj – Celje – Ljubljana – Koper; from Budapest (Déli pu.) to Ajka merged with train 968 from Zalaegerszeg to Budapest (Déli pu.) merged with train 959	present, operates only in the summer period

Status as from December 2022

*:not served by all trains

== Italy ==
List of named passenger trains of Italy

== Kazakhstan ==
Train Name	Train Number	Train Operator	Train Endpoints	Operated
Kazakhstan		RŽD	Moscow (Paveletsky) – Almaty	present
Sibirjak		DB, PKP, BŽD, RŽD, KTŽ	Berlin (Hauptbahnhof) – Astana	present
Tulpary		KTŽ	Astana – Almaty	present

== Netherlands ==
Train Name	Train Number	Train Operator	Train Endpoints	Operated
Edelweiss	TEE 30/31	CIWL; NS; NMBS/SNCB; CFL; SNCF; SBB-CFF-FFS	Lucerne/Basel/Zürich– Amsterdam	1928–1939; 1945–1999
Étoile du Nord	TEE 82/85	CIWL; Nord/SNCF; NMBS/SNCB; NS	Paris Nord – Brussels/Amsterdam	1924–1939; 1946–1996
Île de France	TEE 81/86	SNCF; NMBS/SNCB	Paris Nord – Brussels/Amsterdam	1957–1995
Rheingold; Rheingold Express (1951–1954)	FFD 101/102; F 163/164; F 9/10; F 21/22; TEE 6/7	NS; DR/DB; SBB-CFF-FFS	Genève/Basel – Hook of Holland/Amsterdam	1928–1939; 1951–1987
Van Beethoven	TEE 22/23	NS; Deutsche Bundesbahn/Deutsche Bahn	Amsterdam – Bonn/Nuremberg	1972–2002

== Norway ==
Train Name	Train Number	Train Operator	Train Endpoints	Operated
Bergensbanen		VY	Oslo– Bergen	present
Flåmsbana		VY	Myrdal– Flåm	present

== Poland ==
Train Name	Train Number	Train Operator	Train Endpoints	Operated	Train Category
Chopin	407/14010/1	PKPIC, ČD, ÖBB	Warsaw (Wschodnia) - Wien (Hauptbahnhof)	present	Intercity
Kyiv Express	68/12010/1	PKPIC, UZ	Warsaw (Zachodnia) – Kyiv (Main)	present	
Báthory	14004/131	PKPIC, ČD, ZSSK, MÁV	Warsaw (Wschodnia) – Budapest (Nyugati)	present	Intercity
Polonez		RŽD, BŽD, PKP	Moscow (Belorussky) – Minsk (Main) – Warsaw (Zachodnia)	cancelled	
Sibirjak		DB, PKP, BŽD, RŽD, KTŽ	Berlin (Hauptbahnhof) – Adler; Berlin (Hauptbahnhof) – Astana; Berlin (Hauptbahnhof) – Chelyabinsk; Berlin (Hauptbahnhof) – Kazan; Berlin (Hauptbahnhof) – Moscow (Belorussky); Berlin (Hauptbahnhof) – Novosibirsk; Berlin (Hauptbahnhof) – St. Petersburg (Vitebsky); Berlin (Hauptbahnhof) – Ufa	Discontinued	
Berolinum	17000/248	PKPIC	Warsaw (Wschodnia) – Berlin (Hauptbahnof)	present	Intercity/EuroCity
Silesia	14000/116	PKPIC	Warsaw (Wschodnia) – Prague (Main)	present	Intercity/EuroCity
Sudety	36102/3	PKPIC	Kraków – Jelenia Góra	present	Intercity
Łodzianin	91101	PKPIC	Łódź (Fabryczna) – Warsaw (Wschodnia)	present	Intercity
Strzała Bałtyku		PKP	Warsaw (Gdańska) – Gdynia (Main)	Discontinued in 20th century.	Express
Ondraszek	4100/1	PKPIC	Bielsko-Biała (Main) – Warsaw (Wschodnia)	present	Express Intercity
Oleńka	1630/1	PKPIC	Warsaw (Wschodnia) – Koluszki – Częstochowa – Opole (Main) – Wrocław (Main)	present	Intercity
Tour de Pologne	45108/9 54108/9 (in opposite direction)	PKPIC	Katowice – Zawiercie – Częstochowa – Koluszki – Warszawa (Centralna) – Białystok – Ełk – Giżycko – Korsze – Olsztyn (Main) – Elbląg – Malbork – Tczew – Gdańsk (Main) – Gdynia (Main)	1 June 2010 – 2012 Name and route associated with a cycling race.	Express
Akademia Portfela		PKPIC	Lublin – Szczecin	2011 Commercial name, won in the WOŚP (GOCC) auction	Express
Gold Solution		PKPIC	Poznań – Olsztyn	2011 Commercial name, won in the WOŚP (GOCC) auction	Express

Majority of Polish long-distance trains, as well as some regional and local trains, are named. Their names may be connected with station terminus (e.g. "Berolinum" or "Łodzianin"), famous people (e.g. "Reymont" or "Sobieski") or some literary figures (e.g. "Oleńka" or "Wokulski") and places near the destinations (e.g. "Spodek" or "Śnieżka"). Some can be also more abstract, like "Pirat" ("Pirate") or "Swarożyc" ("Svarozhits")
Train numbers may change every year, they depend from many things, like station terminus or railway lines.

== Portugal ==
Since 1990, with the opening of the LGV Atlantique, the Sud Express only runs between Lisbon and Hendaye and between Irún and Lisbon and it is no longer operated by SNCF. There is a connecting TGV service between Hendaye and Paris and between Paris and Irún. From October 2012, the Sud Express is upgraded to Trenhotel and runs together with the Lusitânia between Lisbon and Medina del Campo via Coimbra and Salamanca. Also, from this date on, the Sud Express is only operated by CP.

Train Name	Train Number	Train Operator	Train Endpoints	Operated
Sud Express	310/313	CP, Renfe, SNCF	Lisbon (Santa Apolónia) – Irun – Hendaye – Paris (Austerlitz); Lisbon (Santa Apolónia) – Irun / Hendaye	1896–1990; 1990–Present
Trenhotel Lusitania	332/335	CP, Renfe	Lisbon (Santa Apolónia) – Madrid (Chamartín)	1995–Present
Celta	420/421/422/423	CP, Renfe	Porto (Campanhã) – Valença – Vigo (Guixar)	2013–Present
Alfa Pendular	12#/13#/18#	CP	Braga – Porto (Campanhã) – Lisbon – Faro	1999–Present
Comboio Azul		CP	Porto (São Bento) – Faro (via Vendas Novas Line and Beja)	Withdrawn
Comboio das Amendoeiras		CP	Porto (Campanhã) – Freixo de Numão – Pocinho – "3 Different Road Trips"	March Weekends during Almond Blossom Season
Comboio das Vindimas		CP	Porto (Campanhã) – Régua	September during Grape Harvest
Comboio das Cerejas		CP	Lisbon (Santa Apolónia) – Castelo Branco	Saturdays between May and July during Cherry Harvest
Comboio Histórico		CP	Régua – Tua	Summer Weekends
Comboio Presidencial		FMNF	TBA	
Internacional		CP	Porto (Campanhã) – Pampilhosa – Hendaye	Withdrawn
Foguete		CP	Porto (São Bento) – Lisbon (Santa Apolónia)	1953–1986
Alfa		CP	Porto (Campanhã) – Lisbon (Santa Apolónia)	1986–1999
Sotavento		CP	Barreiro – Vila Real de Santo António (Guadiana)	1973–1982

== Romania ==
Train Name	Train Number	Train Operator	Train Endpoints	Operated
Dacia	IR 346/347	CFR Călători	Bucharest – Vienna (Hauptbahnhof)	present
Avram Iancu	IC 521/522	CFR Călători	Bucharest - Arad	present; runs together with the Cluj branch until Teiuș
Avram Iancu	IC 531/532	CFR Călători	Bucharest - Cluj-Napoca	present; runs together with the Arad branch until Teiuș
Tomis Express	IC 536/538 IC 581/582	CFR Călători	Bucharest - Constanța	present
Ștefan cel Mare	IC 551/552 IC 561/562	CFR Călători	Bucharest - Suceava Bucharest - Iași	present; runs together until Pașcani
Romania	IR 460/461	CFR Călători BDZ TCDD	Bucharest (București Nord) - Ruse - Gorna Oryahovitsa (further to Sofia, Halkalı, Varna)	present (runs in the summer)

Train Name	Train Number	Train Operator	Train Endpoints	Operated
Traianus	IR 72/73	CFR CĂLĂTORI	Bucharest – Budapest (Keleti)	present

== Russia ==
List of named passenger trains of Russia

== Slovakia ==
Train Name	Train Number	Train Operator	Train Endpoints	Operated
Pendolino Košičan	SC 240 / 241	ZSSK	Košice (Main) – Žilina (Main) – Prague (Main)	present
Valašský Express	EC 120–129; EC 220–223	ZSSK	Žilina (Main) / Púchov – Prague (Main)	present
Báthory	EC 130/131		Budapest (Nyugati) – Bratislava (Main) – Ostrava (main) – Warsaw (Wschodnia)	present
Ostravan	EC 140 - 145	ČD, ZSSK	Žilina (Main) / Púchov – Prague (Main)	present
Hungaria	EC 172 / 173	ČD, ZSSK	Hamburg (Altona) – Berlin (Hbf) – Prague (Main) – Bratislava (Main) – Budapest (Nyugati)	present
Hornád	EC 182 - 199	ČD, ZSSK	Košice (Main) – Budapest (Keleti)	present
Metropolitan	EC 270 - 281	ZSSK	Budapest (Nyugati) – Bratislava (Main) – Prague (Main)	present
Metropolitan Slovenská strela	EC 282/283	ZSSK	Nové Zámky – Prague (Main)	present
Slovakia	EN 442 / 443	ZSSK	Humenné – Prague (Main)	present
Metropol	EN 476 / 477	ZSSK	Budapets (Nyugati) – Břeclav	present
Tatran	Ex 600 - 627; Ex 11621; Ex 15623; Ex 17625; Ex 17628; R 762/765; R 16767	ZSSK	Košice (Main) – Bratislava (Main)	present
Šarišan	Ex 15621 / 17630	ZSSK	Prešov – Bratislava (Main)	present
Kysušan	R 340 - 349	ZSSK	Žilina (Main) – Ostrava (Svinov)	present
Šarišan	Ex 17632 / 15625	ZSSK	Prešov (Main) – Humenné	present
Zemplín	R 614 / 615	ZSSK	Bratislava (Main) – Humenné	present
Považan	R 700 - 731	ZSSK	Bratislava (Main – Trnava / Trenčín / Žilina (Main)	present
Bojnice	R 740 - 757	ZSSK	Prievidza – Bratislava (Nové mesto) / Leopoldov	present
Poľana	R 800 / 801	ZSSK	Košice (Main) – Nové Zámky	present

|-

== Spain ==
Train Name	Train Number	Train Operator	Train Endpoints	Operated
Al Andalus Expreso		Renfe	Granada – Ronda – Jerez de la Frontera	present
Altaria Triana		Renfe	Barcelona (Sants) – Cádiz	present
Catalán Talgo		Elipsos	Montpellier (Saint-Roch) – Barcelona (Estació de França)	1969–2010
El Transcantábrico		FEVE	Ferrol – León – Bilbao/Santiago de Compostela	present
Limón Exprés		FGV	Benidorm – Gata de Gorgos	1971–2005, 2015
Picasso		Renfe	Bilbao (Abando) – Málaga	present
Sud Express	310/313	CP, Renfe, SNCF	Lisbon (Santa Apolónia) – Irun – Hendaye – Paris (Austerlitz); Lisbon (Santa Apolónia) – Irun / Hendaye	1896–1990; 1990–2020
Celta	420/421/422/423	CP, Renfe	Porto (Campanhã) – Valença – Vigo (Guixar)	2013–present
Talgo Covadonga		Renfe	Barcelona (Sants) – Gijón	present
Talgo Finisterre		Renfe	Barcelona (Sants) – A Coruña/Vigo	present
Talgo Mare Nostrum		Elipsos	Montpellier (Saint-Roch) – Valencia – Lorca	1970s–2013
Talgo Miguel de Unamuno		Renfe	Barcelona (Sants) – Irun/Bilbao (Abando)/Salamanca	present
Tren de los Alpes		Elipsos	Madrid (Chamartín) – Bourg-Saint-Maurice	Withdrawn
Trenhotel Antonio Machado	946/947	Renfe	Barcelona (Sants) – Cádiz	–2010
Trenhotel Francisco de Goya	406/407/408/409	Elipsos	Madrid (Chamartín) – Paris (d'Austerlitz)	Withdrawn (2013)
Trenhotel Gibralfaro		Renfe	Barcelona (Sants) – Granada/Málaga	present
Trenhotel Joan Miró	474/477	Elipsos	Barcelona (Estació de França) – Paris (d'Austerlitz)	Withdrawn (2013)
Trenhotel Lusitania	332/335	CP, Renfe	Madrid (Chamartín) – Lisbon (Santa Apolónia)	1995–2020
Trenhotel Pau Casals	272/273/274/275	Elipsos	Barcelona (Estació de França) – Zürich (Hauptbahnhof)	Withdrawn (2013)
Trenhotel Rías Gallegas		Renfe	Madrid – A Coruña/Vigo	present
Trenhotel Salvador Dalí	11273/11274	Elipsos	Barcelona (Estació de França) – Milan (Central)	Withdrawn (2013)

There have been up to 125 named trains in Spain.

== Sweden ==
Train Name	Train Number	Train Operator	Train Endpoints	Operated
Lapplandståget		Veolia	Malmö – Stockholm – Boden – Narvik	2008–2010
Arctic Circle Train	93/94	SJ	Stockholm – Boden – Narvik	present
Norrlandståget		SJ	Gothenburg/Stockholm – Boden – Narvik/Luleå	present
Inlandsbanan		Inlandsbanan	Kristinehamn – Mora – Östersund – Gällivare	present
DN-tåget		Dagens Nyheter	Stockholm – Berlin – Bolzano – Venice	2019
Sörmlandspilen		Transdev	Stockholm – Katrineholm – Hallsberg	Present
Uven		Transdev	Uppsala – Västerås – Eskilstuna – Norrköping – Linköping	Present
Uppsalapendeln		SJ	Stockholm – Märsta – Knivsta – Uppsala	Present
MTRX		VR Group	Stockholm – Skövde – Gothenburg	Present

Before 1980 there were several more named trains in Sweden

== Switzerland ==
List of named passenger trains of Switzerland

== Ukraine ==
Train Name	Train Number	Train Operator	Train Endpoints	Operated
Capital Express		UZ, RŽD	Kyiv – Moscow-Kiyevsky	discontinued
Kyiv		UZ, RŽD	Kyiv – Moscow-Kiyevsky	discontinued
Ukraine		UZ, RŽD	Kyiv – Moscow-Kiyevsky	present
Dukla		UZ	Kyiv – Chop	present
Rose of Donbas		UZ, RŽD	Donetsk – Moscow-Kursky	discontinued due to Russo-Ukrainian War
Tysa		UZ, RŽD	Uzhgorod – Moscow-Kiyevsky	discontinued
Pridnieprovye		UZ, RŽD	Moscow-Kursky – Dnipro	present
Luhan		UZ	Kyiv – Luhansk	discontinued due to Russo-Ukrainian War
Slavutych		UZ	Kyiv – Simferopol	since 2014 terminates at Novooleksijiwka at the Crimean border due to annexation of Crimea by Russia
Nikolai Konarev		UZ	Kharkiv – Moscow-Kursky	present
Odesa		UZ, RŽD	Odesa – Moscow-Kiyevsky	present
Karpaty		UZ	Odesa – Lviv	present
Sevastopolets		UZ	Kyiv – Sevastopol	discontinued since 2014 due to annexation of Crimea by Russia
Kashtan (Chestnut)		UZ	Kyiv – Berlin Hauptbahnhof	discontinued
Donbas		UZ	Donetsk – Kyiv	discontinued since 2014 due to Russo-Ukrainian War
Sevastopol		UZ	Sevastopol – Kyiv	discontinued since 2014 due to annexation of Crimea by Russia

== United Kingdom ==
List of named passenger trains of the United Kingdom
