= Danube Express =

European private touring train

The Danube Express is a private train operating in central and eastern Europe. It provides a hotel-on-wheels service with sleeping cars of three comfort categories (Superior DeLuxe, DeLuxe and Heritage classes), completed by restaurant, lounge and staff cars. Its operating season is generally from April to October.

The operation of the train has begun in September 2008. Most of the journeys were organized from Budapest to Istanbul via Romania and Bulgaria, and return via Serbia, but there were also frequent tours to Austria, Slovakia, Poland, the Czech Republic and Germany.

Since 2014 the train belongs to Golden Eagle Luxury Trains, who has extended the range of tours significantly. Journeys have taken part until 2016 even to and inside Iran, and from Istanbul to Venice through the Balkan states, but since then all the tours to and via Turkey are cancelled due to safety reasons. New tours were made in the recent years through Italy - down to Sicily and via Switzerland.

== Rolling stock ==
Carriage's name	Carriage type	Carriage number	Year of construction	Built by	Origin	Year of refitment	Capacity / layout
Bohemia	Superior DeLuxe sleeping car	WLmee 51 55 89-89 010-9	1985	DWA Bautzen	DR/DB/BTE couchette car	2017	4 compartments with double bed and en-suite bathroom, a steward's cabin and a common bathroom
Dalmatia	Superior DeLuxe sleeping car	WLmee 51 55 89-89 011-7	1985	DWA Bautzen	DR/DB/BTE couchette car	2018	4 compartments with double bed and en-suite bathroom, a steward's cabin and a common bathroom
Bavaria	Superior DeLuxe sleeping car	WLmee 51 55 89-89 012-5	1985	DWA Bautzen	DR/DB/BTE couchette car	2018	4 compartments with double bed and en-suite bathroom, a steward's cabin and a common bathroom
Saxonia	DeLuxe sleeping car	WLm 56 55 89-90 001-3	1990	Ganz-Hunslet	mail van of the Hungarian Post	2007	5 compartments with twin beds and en-suite bathroom and a steward's cabin
Cracovia	DeLuxe sleeping car	WLm 56 55 89-90 002-1	1990	Ganz-Hunslet	mail van of the Hungarian Post	2007	5 compartments with twin beds and en-suite bathroom and a steward's cabin
Vindobona	DeLuxe sleeping car	WLm 56 55 89-90 003-9	1990	Ganz Hunslet	mail van of the Hungarian Post	2007	5 compartments with twin beds and en-suite bathroom and a steward's cabin
Hungaria	DeLuxe sleeping car	WLm 56 55 89-90 004-7	1990	Ganz-Hunslet	mail van of the Hungarian Post	2007	5 compartments with twin beds and en-suite bathroom and a steward's cabin
	Heritage class state car	WLS 56 55 89-69 051-2	1958	MÁV Dunakeszi Workshops	used in Hungarian governmental train		4 compartments with bunk beds and washbasin, a DeLuxe compartment with double bed and en-suite bathroom, a kitchenette, and a common bathroom
	Heritage class state car	WLS 56 55 89-69 055-3	1952	MÁV Dunakeszi Workshops	used in Hungarian governmental train		4 compartments with bunk beds and washbasin, a DeLuxe compartment with double bed and en-suite bathroom, a kitchenette, and a common bathroom
	Heritage class sleeping car	WL 56 55 70-29 361-5	1956	MÁV Dunakeszi Workshops	used in Hungarian governmental train		9 compartments with bunk beds and washbasin, a kitchenette, and a common bathroom
	Heritage class sleeping car	WL 56 55 70-29 362-3	1956	MÁV Dunakeszi Workshops	used in Hungarian governmental train		9 compartments with bunk beds and washbasin, a kitchenette, and a common bathroom
Pannonia	Dining car	WRm 51 55 88-81 029-3	1981	DWA Bautzen	used in Hungarian governmental train	2000	42 seats for two and four
Albert Flórián	Dining car	WRm 51 55 88-81 012-4	1981	DWA Bautzen	MÁV dining car	2014	42 seats for two and four
Budapest	Lounge car	WRm 51 55 88-81 004-1	1981	DWA Bautzen	MÁV dining car	2003	variable layout as dining, bar, or lecture car with a maximum seat capacity of 42
Balaton	Bar car	WRSmee 51 55 87-71 001-0	1981	DWA Bautzen	MÁV dining car	2015	sofas, seats at tables and at the bar, piano
Salon Istropolitan	Staff state car	BcR 56 55 85-40 041-1	1968	DWA Görlitz	CSD/ZSSK sleeping car	2001	6 three-bed sleeper compartments, a dining saloon and a kitchenette
	Generator and staff car	WLDsm 51 55 89-71 001-8	1990	Ganz-Hunslet	mail van of the Hungarian Post	2014	storage facilities, sleeping compartments and a room for conductors

Some of the cars were also previously operated on its predecessor train Royal Hungarian Express.

The carriages are based in Budapest, Hungary, and operated by MÁV Nosztalgia Ltd..

Train composition may vary upon demand between 7 and 13 carriages. There are no specific engines for the haulage, but in Hungary - at least at the departures and arrivals from/to Budapest - it's done particularly by heritage (even steam) locomotives.

== Tours ==
Tour's name	Route	Duration (on train only)	Years, when provided
Vienna, Lakes and Mountains	Budapest - Keszthely - Vienna - Graz - Budapest	3 days	2008
Central Europe By Luxury Train	Budapest - Kosice - Cracow - Prague - Berlin	4 days	2008
The Polish Explorer	Budapest - Kosice - Auschwitz - Cracow - Malbork - Gdansk - Warsaw	4 days	2008, 2011-2012
The Polish Explorer	Berlin - Gdansk - Malbork - Cracow - Zakopane - Kosice - Budapest	4 days	2009
Transsylvania And The Bosphorus	Budapest - Sighisoara - Brasov - Veliko Turnovo - Istanbul	4 days	2008
The Bosphorus Voyager	Budapest - Novi Sad - Sofia - Istanbul	3 days	2009
The Transylvanian	Budapest - Sighisoara - Brasov - Veliko Turnovo - Kazanlak - Istanbul*	4 days	2009-2016
The Central European	Budapest - Kosice - Prague - Carlsbad - Dresden - Berlin	3 days	2009
The Bohemian	Budapest - Vienna - Prague - Carlsbad - Brussels*	3 days	2009
The Bohemian	Frankfurt - Karlstejn - Prague - Budapest	3 days	2010
The Habsburg	Budapest - Vienna - Salzburg - Berchtesgaden - Frankfurt	3 days	2010
The Istanbul Loop	Budapest - Sighisoara - Brasov - Veliko Turnovo - Kazanlak - Istanbul - Sofia - Novi Sad - Budapest	9 days	2011-2012
Central European Classics	Budapest - Keszthely - Vienna - Bratislava - Cracow - Prague*	4 days	2015-2016
The Balkan Explorer	Istanbul - Plovdiv - Sofia - Thessaloniki - Skopje - Belgrade - Mostar - Sarajevo - Ljubljana - Trieste - Venice*	8 days	2015-2016, 2019
Balkan Odyssey	Budapest - Sighisoara - Brasov - Veliko Tarnovo - Plovdiv - Belgrade - Mostar - Sarajevo - Ljubljana - Trieste - Venice*	7 days	2017-, 2019
Hellenic Treasures	Budapest - Keszthely - Ljubljana - Sarajevo - Mostar - Belgrade - Sofia - Plovdiv - Thessaloniki - Athens		2017
Treasures oOf Eastern Europe	Prague - Zittau - Berlin - Gdansk - Malbork - Zakopane - Krakow -Bratislava - Vienna - Keszthely - Budapest	8 days	2015-2016
Treasures oOf Eastern Europe	Venice - Prague - Zittau - Berlin - Gdansk - Malbork - Zakopane - Krakow - Vienna - Keszthely - Budapest		2017
Sicilian Odyssey (southbound)	Venice - Cremona - Verona - Bologna - Bari - Pompeii - Villa San Giovanni - Palermo - Agrigento - Ragusa - Syracuse - Caltagirone - Catania - Taormina		2017-2018
Sicilian Odyssey (southbound)	Budapest - Venice - San Marino - Bari - Naples - Pompeii - Palermo - Agrigento - Ragusa - Syracuse - Catania - Taormina	8 days	2019
Sicilian Odyssey (northbound)	Taormina - Catania - Caltagirone - Syracuse - Raguse - Agrigenti - Palermo - Salerno - Amalfi Coast - Rome - San Gimignano - Florence - Venice		2017-2018
New Year in Vienna	Budapest - Keszthely - Graz - Vienna - Cesky Krumlov - Prague - Kosice - Budapest	6 days	2017-
Grand Alpine Expressipi	Budapest - Vienna - Semmering - Achensee - Innsbruck - Zurich - Lake Como - Milano - Verona - Trieste - Ljubljana - Venice	7 days	2018-
A Taste of Italy	Taormina - Bari - San Marino - Ljubljana - Budapest	3 days	2019
Castles of Transylvania	Istanbul - Veliko Turnovo - Sinaia - Brasov - Sighisoara - Sibiu - Budapest	5 days	2019

== See also ==
- List of named passenger trains of Europe
