= Sokolský den =

Patriotic march

- March by František Kmoch
- Other name: "Čtvrtého července"
- Form: Ternary
- Written: 1871
- Text: Karel Tůma (politician)

"Sokolský den" ("Sokol Day") also known as "Čtvrtého července" ("4th of July"), is a patriotic march composed by Czech music composer František Kmoch. It was composed in the period short after 1871, when he started working in local Sokol union in Kolín. Solely instrumental composition were later furnished by lyrics of unknown origin with origin in the United States, within the Czech American diaspora. It were later written down by Young Czech politician and writer Karel Tůma. An A-flat major composition later arranged by Czech composer Emil Štolc is written in ternary form.

The first verse of the lyrics mentions the 4th of July, which refers to Sokol gymnastics gatherings on the date of the United States Independence Day in Prague, promoted by Sokol organizations among the Czech diaspora in the United States. It promoted American liberal values and ideas of American independence as a role model for Czech society dissatisfied with the oppressive regime in Austria-Hungary. The composition is one of the marches of the Czech nationalist gymnastics organization Sokol and reflects 19th century antagonisms towards the results of the Battle of White Mountain in 1620. Other versions of the lyrics also refer 6 July, the anniversary of the death of Jan Hus in 1415.

Adaptation of lyrics of the march also appeared in 1985 comedy-play Dobytí severního pólu by Zdeněk Svěrák and Ladislav Smoljak.

== Lyrics ==
Čtvrtého července na strahovských hradbách
stáli Sokolíci, stáli Sokolíci
v dlouhých hustých řadách.

V dlouhých hustých řadách s vlajícím praporem
smutně pohlíželi
na vrch za Břevnovem.

Na vrch za Břevnovem směrem k Bílé hoře,
pohleď sokolíku, pohleď sokolíku,
kdo to tam as oře.

Oře tam Čechie, máti naše drahá
ona vyorává, ona vyorává,
naše stará práva.

Naše stará práva jsou tam zakopána
od našich nepřátel
jsou tam zašlapána.

Orej máti, orej, práva nám vyorej,
až nebudeš moci
Sokola zavolej.

Sokola zavolej od slovanské Prahy,
on ti dopomůže, on ti dopomůže
zahnat naše vrahy.

Zahnat naše vrahy do pekel kam patří
a pak provolejme
sláva, nazdar Vlasti!

Translation:

Fourth of July on the Strahov walls
the Falcons stood, the Falcons stood
in long dense rows.

In long dense ranks with flying banner
they looked on sadly
to the hill beyond Břevnov.

On the hill behind Břevnov towards the White Mountain,
look there falcon, look there falcon
who is plowing on there.

Čechie is plowing there, our dear mother
she claims there, she claims there
our old rights.

Our old rights are buried there
from our enemies
they are trampled in there.

Come on, mother, plow us our our rights,
until you can no longer
Call Sokol then.

call Sokol of Slavic Prague,
he will help you, he will help you
drive away our killers.

Drive off our murderers right to hells where they belong
and then let's call:
Glory and cheers to the Motherland!
