= Sibirjak =

Passenger train

Sibiryak
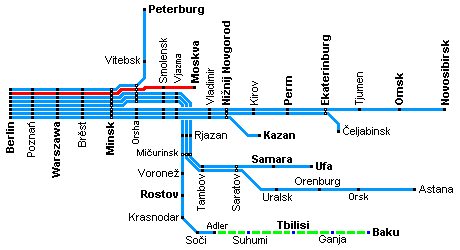
- Map of Sibiryak routes

Overview
- Status: Discontinued
- Locale: Germany, Russia, Poland, Belarus, Kazakhstan
- Former operators: Deutsche Bahn, Russian Railways, Polish State Railways, Belarusian Railway, Kazakhstan Temir Zholy

Route
- Termini: Berlin; Novosibirsk (and others)
- Service frequency: One weekly

Technical
- Track gauge: 1,520 mm (4 ft 11 27/32 in); 1,435 mm (4 ft 8 1/2 in)

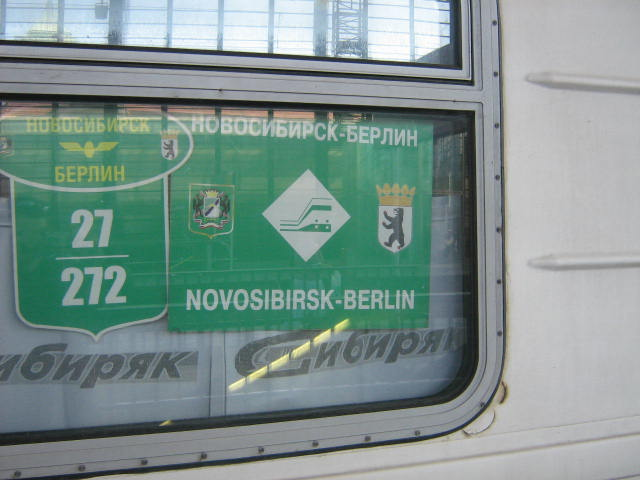
Logo of Sibirjak

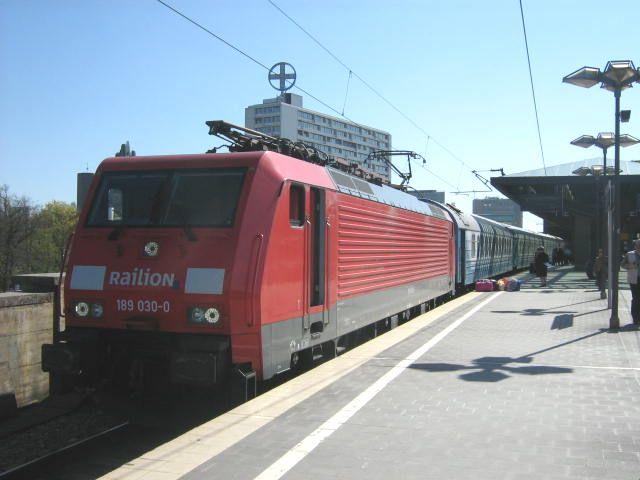
Class 189 locomotive in Berlin Zoologischer Garten station

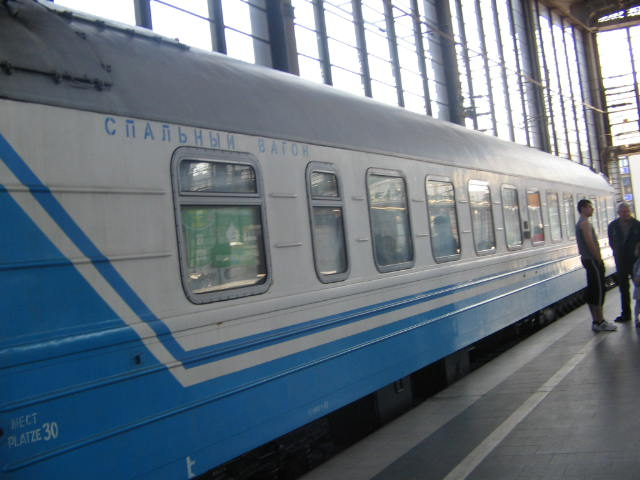
Passenger car in Berlin Zoologischer Garten station

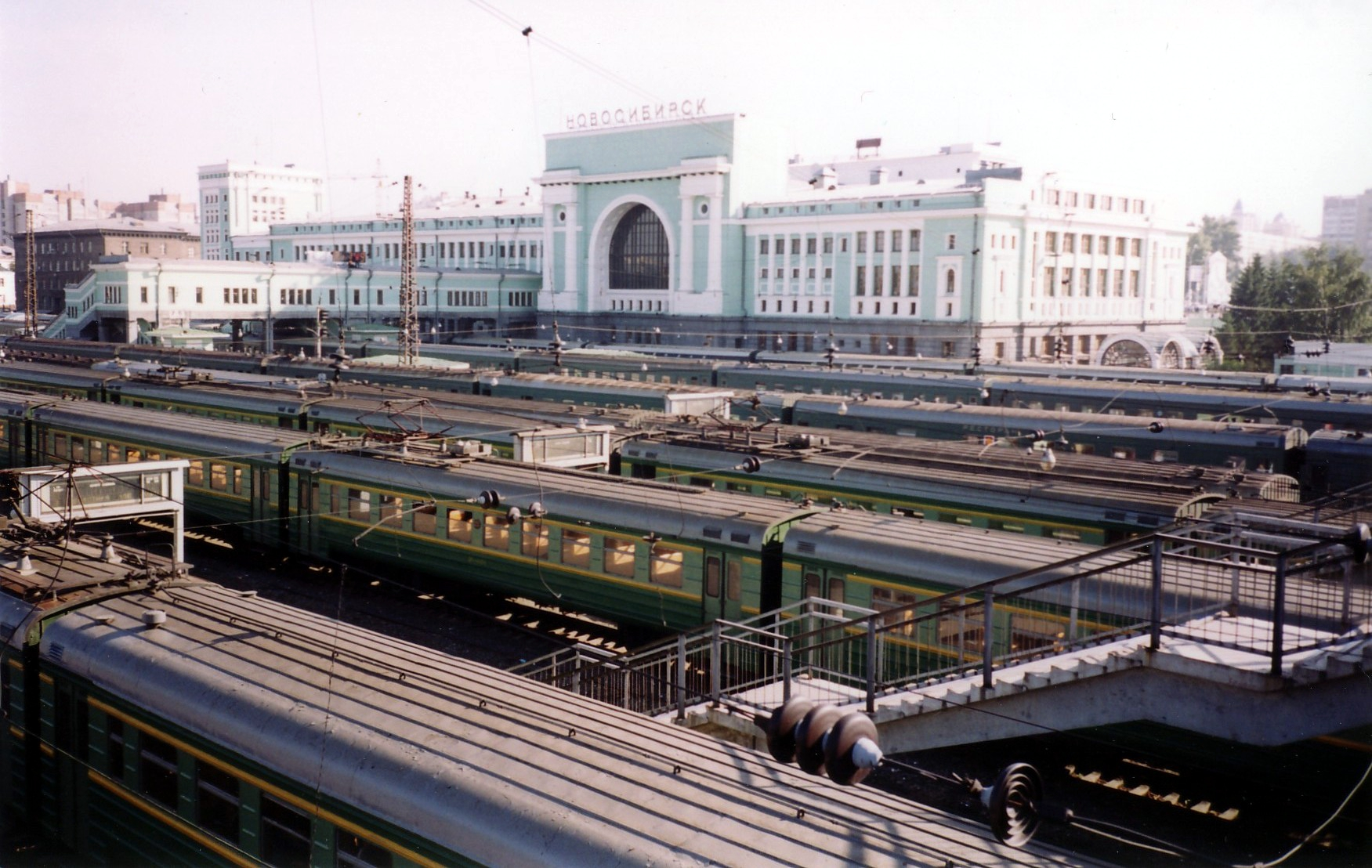
Novosibirsk Glavnyj Vokzal

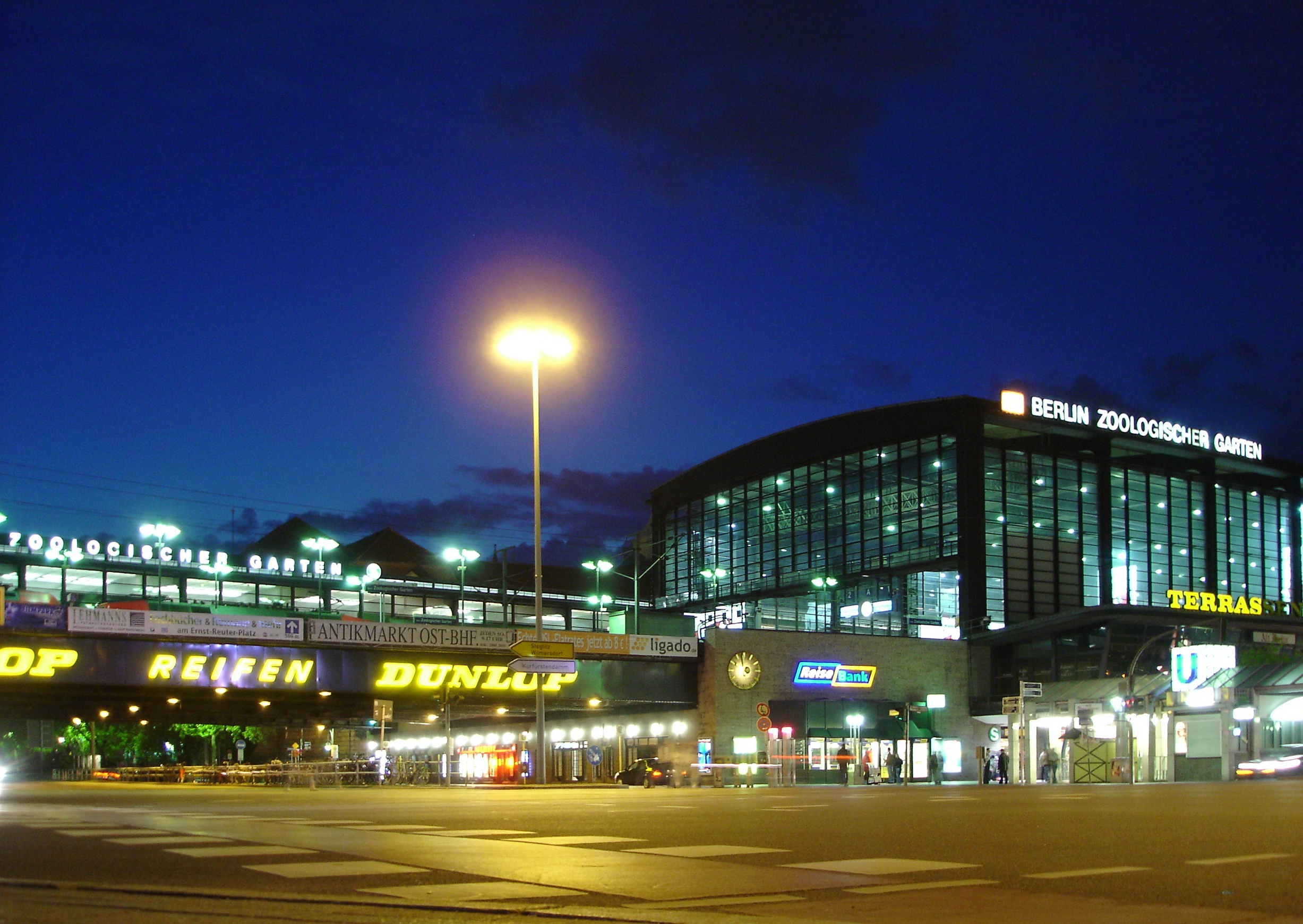
Berlin Zoologischer Garten

Sibiryak (Note: Russian: Сибиряк, IPA: [sʲɪbʲɪˈrʲak], lit. 'a Siberian [person]') (/sɪbɪərˈjæk/ sib-eer-YAK) was a passenger train which linked Berlin to some of main routes and cities of Russia. The train passed through Germany, Poland, Belarus, Russia and Kazakhstan, partly traveling on the Trans-Siberian Railway. With 5,130 km from Berlin to Novosibirsk it was the longest route of any that depart from a station within the European Union. The train service was discontinued with effect from 14 December 2013, due to lack of demand. The line was not actively promoted to potential customers by the Deutsche Bahn, but it was available in their search engine.

== Overview ==
The train, which departed from Berlin Zoologischer Garten station, and stopped also at Berlin Hauptbahnhof and Berlin Ostbahnhof, ran through Poland and Belarus, serving Warsaw and Minsk. In the Belarusian capital the train was divided into branches: Siberian (4 branches), Southern (3 branches), and one to St.Petersburg. The total number of destinations was eight: Novosibirsk, St.Petersburg, Moscow, Kazan, Chelyabinsk, Ufa, Nur-Sultan (in Kazakhstan) and Adler, a city in the suburbs of Sochi.
The train was scheduled to arrive in Berlin every Saturday at 09:12 and to leave again at 15:16.

Until the early 2000s the train had departed from Berlin-Lichtenberg station. From 2008 it periodically changed its Berliner route, stopping again at Lichtenberg and ending at Gesundbrunnen station.

== Routes ==
=== Scheme ===
Endpoints	Main cities traversed	km	Duration
Berlin - St.Petersburg	Poznań-Warsaw-Brest-Minsk-Vitebsk	2,284	36:12
Berlin - Moscow	Poznań-Warsaw-Brest-Minsk-Smolensk	1,978	28:40
Berlin - Novosibirsk	Poznań-Warsaw-Brest-Minsk-Smolensk- Vladimir-N.Novgorod-Kirov-Perm- Yekaterinburg-Tyumen-Omsk	5,130	89:18
Berlin - Chelyabinsk	Poznań-Warsaw-Brest-Minsk-Smolensk- Vladimir-N.Novgorod-Kirov-Perm-Yekaterinburg	3,892	72:28
Berlin - Kazan	Poznań-Warsaw-Brest-Minsk- Smolensk-Vladimir-N.Novgorod	2,836	50:54
Berlin - Ufa	Poznań-Warsaw-Brest-Minsk-Smolensk- Ryazan-Tambov-Saratov-Samara	3,871	72:06
Berlin - Astana	Poznań-Warsaw-Brest-Minsk-Smolensk- Ryazan-Tambov-Saratov-Uralsk-Orenburg	4,300	99:15
Berlin - Adler	Poznań-Warsaw-Brest-Minsk-Smolensk- Ryazan-Voronezh-Rostov-Krasnodar-Sochi	3,643	63:58

=== Description ===
The train ran on a common route from Berlin Zoologischer Garten to Minsk Passazhirsky, through Poznań (Dworzec Główny station), Warsaw (Centralna and Wschodnia), Brest (Tsentralnaya) and Baranovichi (Tsentralnaya). Other stops were in Rzepin, Łuków and Terespol. From Minsk to Orsha the train was separated into 3 branches through Zhodzina and Barysaw.

- Berlin - St. Petersburg: This was a periodic train running, from Orsha, to Vitebsk and through Pskov Oblast. Its terminal in Saint Petersburg was at Vitebskaya station.
- Berlin - Moscow: This train worked daily as part of the Amsterdam-Moscow EuroNight. On Saturdays, as part of Sibirjak, it reached Smolensk, Vyazma and ended at Moskva Belorusskaya station.
- Berlin - Novosibirsk: This was the longest route of Sibirjak as for km. From Vyazma to Vladimir it bypassed Moscow reaching Nizhny Novgorod, Kirov, Perm and Yekaterinburg. After this city the train entered in Central Siberia through Tyumen and Omsk and ended at Novosibirsk Glavny Vokzal. Periodically the train ran, from Vladimir to Yekaterinburg, through Kazan, excluding Novgorod, Kirov and Perm.
- Berlin - Kazan: At Nizhny Novgorod station some detached coaches served Kazan. Periodically it happened that the Berlin-Novosibirsk ran through the Tatar capital excluding Novgorod from the main Siberian route. When the train was scheduled to this line (Vladimir-Kazan-Yekaterinburg) it was guaranteed a service of wagons from Kazan to Nizhny Novgorod.
- Berlin - Cheljabinsk: At Yekaterinburg station some detached coaches served Chelyabinsk. The only stop was at Kamensk-Uralsky.
- Berlin - Ufa: After Minsk and Smolensk, the train reached Ryazan and Michurinsk. Here the coaches to Adler were separated from the rest of the train. The train continued through Tambov, Rtishchevo and Saratov. At this station, after the detachment of the coaches to Astana and a long stop of 7 hours, the train continued to Samara, Buguruslan and ended at Ufa Station.
- Berlin - Astana: After the long stop in Saratov the train entered in Kazakhstan at Oral. After the stop it entered again in Russia reaching Orenburg, Orsk and Kartaly, at Russian-Kazakh frontier. It ended at Astana station, 99 hours after its departure from Berlin. This was a periodic service.
- Berlin - Adler: After the stop in Michurinsk the train travelled to southern Russia following the line of the Don River. It passed Liski, Voronezh, Rostov, Novocherkassk, Krasnodar, reaching the Black Sea coast in Tuapse. It continued to Sochi and the neighbouring town of Adler, close to the borders with Abkhazia, breakaway republic from Georgia.

There were some plans to extend the service to Baku.

== See also ==
- Trans-Siberian Railway
- List of named passenger trains of Europe
