= František Kmoch =

Czech composer and conductor (1848–1912)

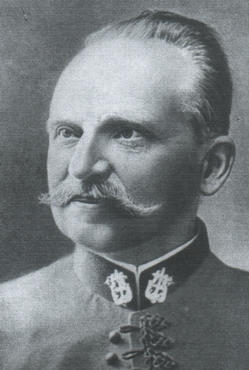
- Born: 1 August 1848; Zásmuky, Austrian Empire
- Died: 30 March 1912 (aged 63); Kolín, Austria-Hungary
- Occupation(s): Composer, conductor

František Kmoch (1 August 1848 – 30 April 1912) was a Czech composer and conductor.

== Life and career ==
František Kmoch was born in Zásmuky near Kolín, Bohemia. His father was a tailor and a clarinetist who performed folk music. As a child, František learned to play the violin, and by the age of 10 he was already beginning to compose small pieces.

In 1868 he was studying at the Teachers College in Praha, and by 1869 he had become a teacher in Suchdol. In addition to his occupation as a teacher, he zealously performed in several ensembles, continued to develop himself as a conductor, and composed. In 1873 he was excluded from further assignment as an instructor, allegedly because he had neglected his teaching duties, preferring instead to appear with performing ensembles at balls. It has been suggested, however, that the dismissal was a political decision, since Kmoch did not conceal his sympathies for the Czech nationalistic athletic Sokol movement.

In 1868 he became conductor of the Sokol Wind Orchestra in Kolín. During the 1873 Gymnastics Festival in Prague the Orchestra played a prominent role in the opening ceremony, and visitors who attended the event warmly received the wind orchestra's offerings, both original compositions by Kmoch and arrangements of well-known folk songs.

During this time he married Josefa Kahslova, daughter of a metalworker from Kolín. They had five daughters.

The town music corps in Kolín also chose him as its conductor and he immediately created a school of music attached to it. In 1882 the school gained official state recognition. Various cities, including Prague, invited him to become conductor of their respective city wind orchestras, but Kmoch preferred to remain in Kolín. With his excellent wind orchestra he made excursions to Vienna, Budapest, and Kraków, and even a three-month journey through Russia. He died in Kolín.

== Style ==
In reaction to the military marches of the Austro-Hungarian empire, he wrote marches that were deeply rooted in Czech tradition, folklore and folk music. In a Kmoch march, the middle section which we generally know today as the trio was almost always underlaid with texts, to be sung by musicians or choirs, or eventually the entire audience. These texts were an important expression in the development of Czech national consciousness.

== Appreciation ==
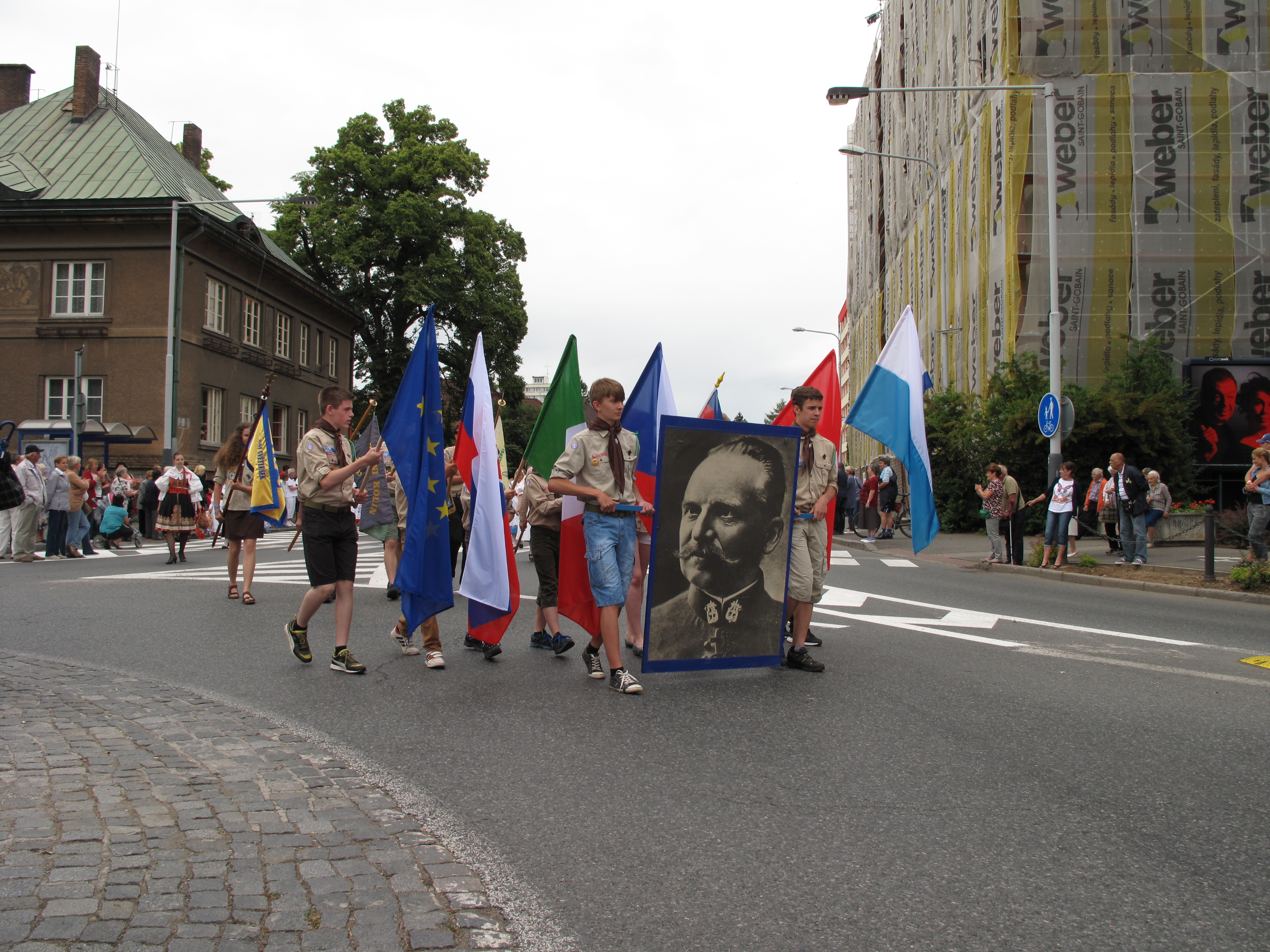
Kmochův Kolín 2016

In gratitude the town of Kolín has organized the Kmochův Kolín festival annually since 1961, which attracts prominent wind orchestras from all of Europe. A sculpture with the image of František Kmoch stands in the Kolín town park, and a wind orchestra in the town still bears his name. A biographical film about Kmoch was produced with the title He was a Czech musician, and an operetta about him bears the title How Kmoch Lived and Played. In 1998, at the 150th anniversary of his birth, the Czech National Bank issued a 200-Czech koruna silver coin.

Kmoch is considered the most popular march composer of his country after Julius Fučík. His oeuvre includes about 500 works.

== Orchestral works ==
- Andulko šafářová
- Visit to Vienna, a concert polka
- Wind music is playing
- Česká muzika
- Diese Musik, ja die gefällt
- Duo for two trumpets
- Festival March
- Springtime Youth
- Hoj, Mařenko!
- Jarabáček
- Jara mládí
- Kolíne, Kolíne ("Kolíne, Kolíne, stojíš v pěkné rovině" [Kolin, Kolin, you lie in a beautiful plain])
- Koně vraný
- Letem světem (Flights through the world)
- My beautiful homeland
- Měsíček svítí
- Milý sen Concert waltzes
- Můj koníček
- Muziky, muziky
- Na motoru
- Na hrazdě, kvapík
- Na stříbropěnném Labi
- Nad Labem
- Plzeňský Pochod
- Po starodávnu
- Pod našima okny
- Pode mlejnem
- Pošumavské stráně
- Romance pro křídlovku
- Rozmarná
- Roztomilá
- Beautiful Prague
- Šly panenky silnicí
- Sokol Nazdar!
- Sokolský den
- Vraný koně
- Vy hvězdičky
- Vždy milá
- Za sokolským praporem
- Zastaveníčko
- Zelení hájové!
- Zlatá Praha
