= Leoš Janáček Airport Ostrava =

Airport serving the city of Ostrava, Czech Republic

Leoš Janáček Airport Ostrava Letiště Leoše Janáčka Ostrava

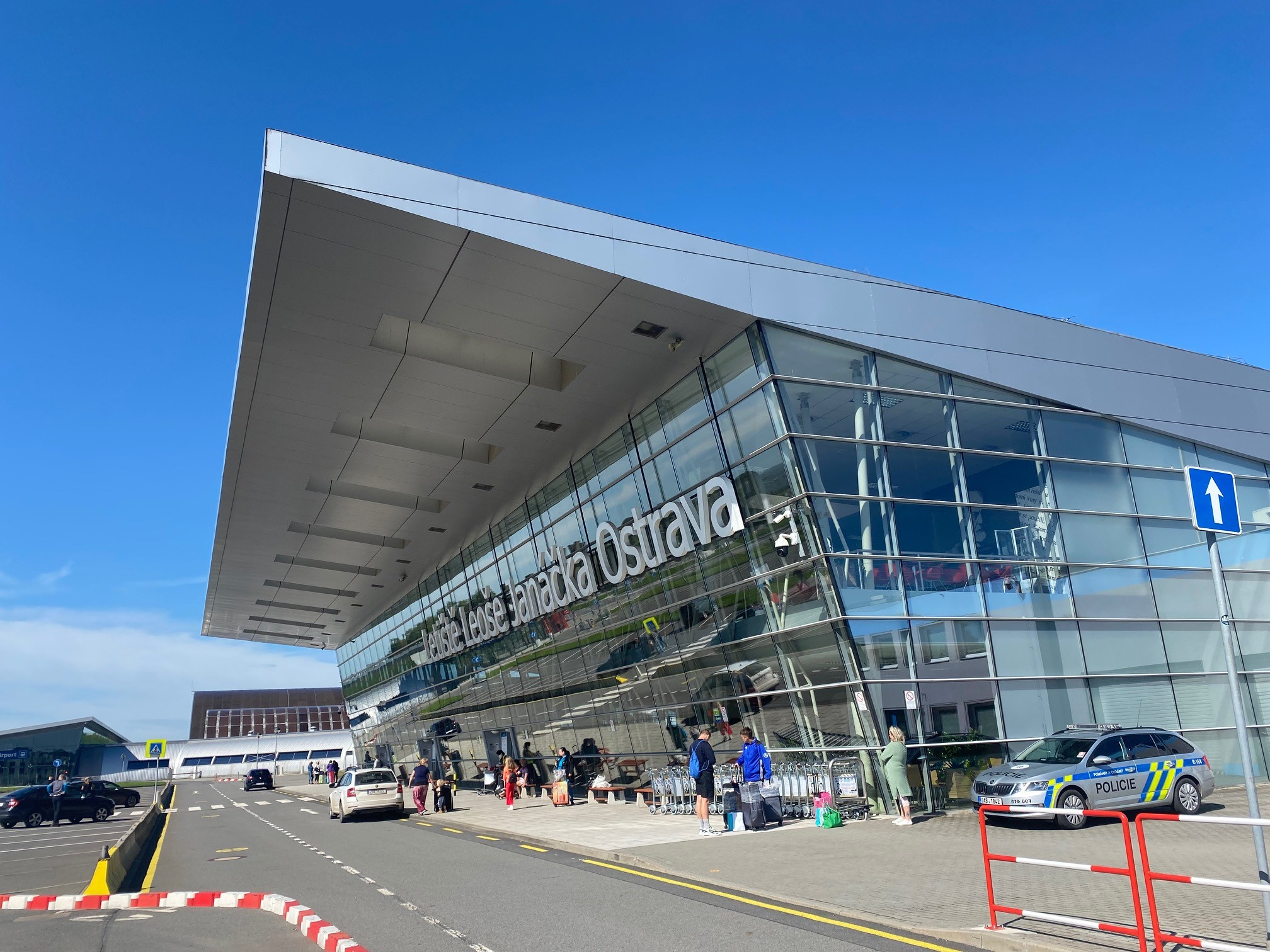
- IATA: OSR; ICAO: LKMT

Summary
- Airport type: Public
- Owner: Moravian-Silesian Region
- Operator: Letiště Ostrava, a.s.
- Serves: Ostrava
- Location: Mošnov
- Opened: 1959; 67 years ago
- Focus city for: Smartwings (seasonal)
- Time zone: CET (UTC+01:00)
  - Summer (DST): CEST (UTC+02:00)
- Elevation AMSL: 844 ft (257 m)
- Coordinates: 49°41′46″N 018°06′39″E
- Website: www.airport-ostrava.cz/en/

Map
- Location within Czech Republic

Runways
Direction	Length		Surface
Direction	m	ft	Surface
04/22	3,500	11,484	Concrete

Helipads
Number	Length		Surface
Number	m	ft	Surface
H1	20	66	Concrete

Statistics (2025)
- Passengers: 506 201
- Passenger change 23–24: ▲3%
- Cargo: 22 483 t
- Cargo change 23–24: ▲59%

Leoš Janáček Airport Ostrava (Czech: Letiště Leoše Janáčka Ostrava) (IATA: OSR, ICAO: LKMT), formerly Ostrava-Mošnov International Airport, is the airport of the city of Ostrava in the Czech Republic, a major economic and industrial centre. It is located 20 km (12 mi) to the southwest of the city and also acts as a point of entry to northern Moravia and Czech Silesia. The airport was renamed in December 2006 after the composer Leoš Janáček.

NATO Days in Ostrava, a military air show, has been an event at the airport since 2003.

== History ==
The first passenger airport in Ostrava was Ostrava-Hrabůvka airport that served flights to Prague from 1935 until 1959. The airfield in Mošnov originates from 1959. The Prague route was relocated to the new airport at that year. The airport served as air base for the Czech Air Force until 1989. Beginning in 1989, after the airport was placed under ČSL control, the airport was used by holiday charter operators.

The majority of passenger flights to land in Ostrava were charter flights to Mediterranean destinations in Tunisia, Spain and Bulgaria. The flights were sporadic during the summer months. The airline Air Ostrava (successor to Air Vítkovice) had a base in Ostrava since 1994. Air Ostrava opened routes to Verona, Amsterdam and Ljubljana. The airline collapsed in 2000, leaving the airport without a base carrier.

In 1997, Czech leisure airline Fischer Air owned by the travel and tourism company Fischer commenced a seasonal flights to Antalya, Burgas, Gran Canaria, Heraklion, Hurghada, Ibiza, Mallorca, Monastir, Rhodes, Split and Tenerife until the collapse of the airline in 2005 meant the discontinuation of the routes to Canary Islands.

== Facilities ==
Leoš Janáček Airport Ostrava is at an elevation of 844 feet (257 m) above mean sea level. It has one concrete runway: 04/22 is 11,519 by 207 feet (3,511 x 63 m). There are numerous hangars east of Runway 04/22. There is a large, full service aircraft modification and maintenance facility opened in 2008 on the north side of the airport. The maintenance facility was subsequently expanded in 2020 at a cost of CZK380 million. It has space under the roof for 2 more 737-size aircraft. The airport is open 24 hours daily. As well as being able to serve aircraft as large as a Boeing 747, the airport has a heliport that allows it to serve helicopters, alongside fixed-wing aircraft. Due to its distance from the city centre, there are no noise restrictions enforced at the airport.

Construction of a new terminal started in July 2005. It cost CZK 320 million (about 10.66 million EUR) and opened on 13 December 2006. A new railway station 50 metres (160 ft) from the international airport terminal was opened in 2015.

== Operations ==
In January 2023, typical commercial passenger traffic included Boeing 737s, Embraer 170s and Embraer 175s models. Currently, LOT Polish Airlines operates the Embraer 170 and 175 to OSR. Ryanair utilizes Boeing 737s for all flights. LOT Polish Airlines formerly operated flights to Warsaw on the Dash 8-Q400 aircraft (which was the only scheduled passenger service to OSR on turbo-prop aircraft). Numerous airlines operate daily flights to Leipzig/Halle using the Boeing 737s and Boeing 757s models on behalf of DHL. Swiftair also operates daily flights to Cologne/Bonn using the ATR-42 twin-turboprop aircraft on behalf of United Parcel Service. Uzbekistan Airways operates their Boeing 767-300F; while SkyTaxi uses their Boeing 767-200F, these are the only wide-body aircraft to routinely use the airport. Numerous other aircraft are used for frequent charter flights.

== Terminal ==
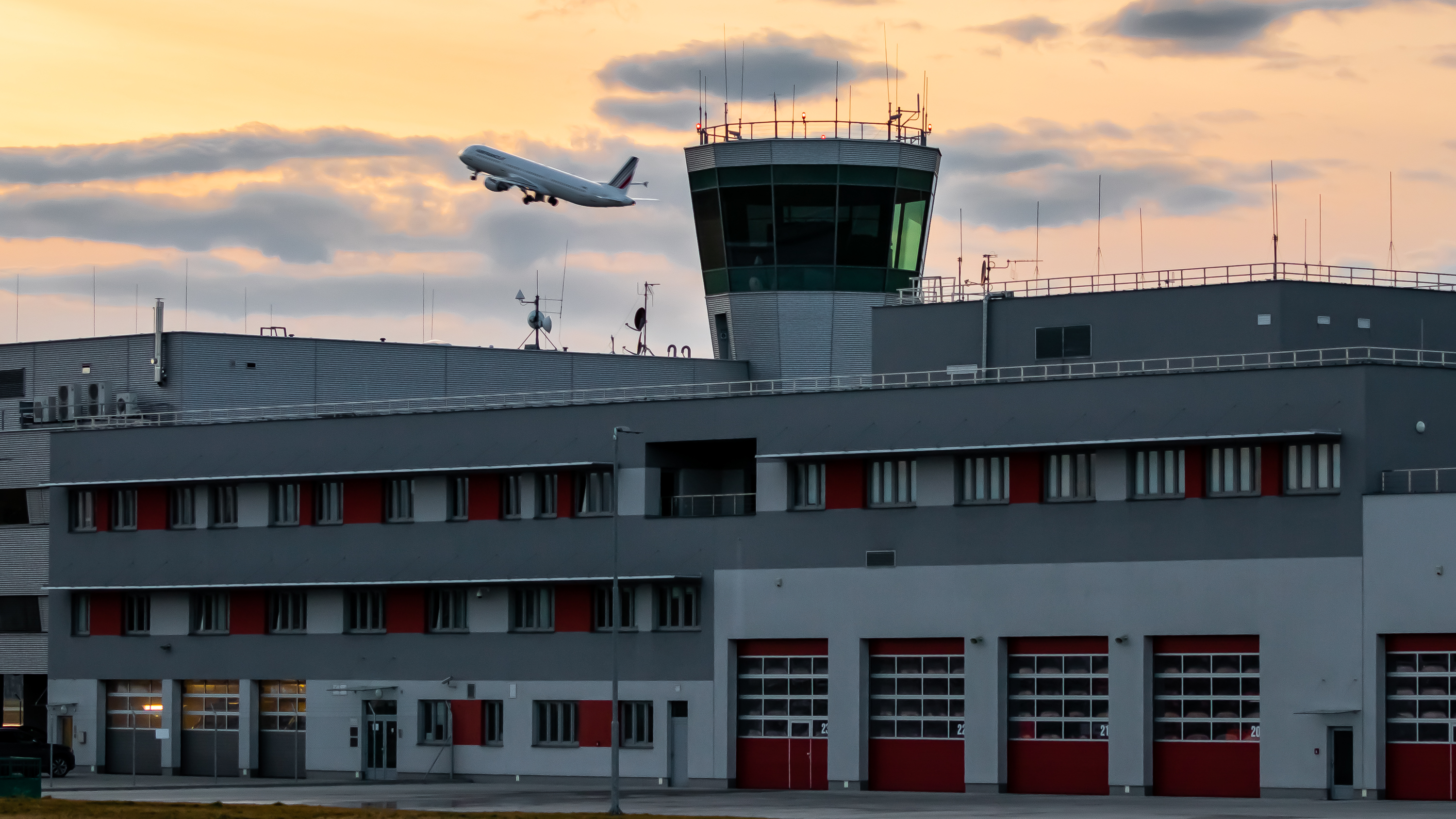
Control tower

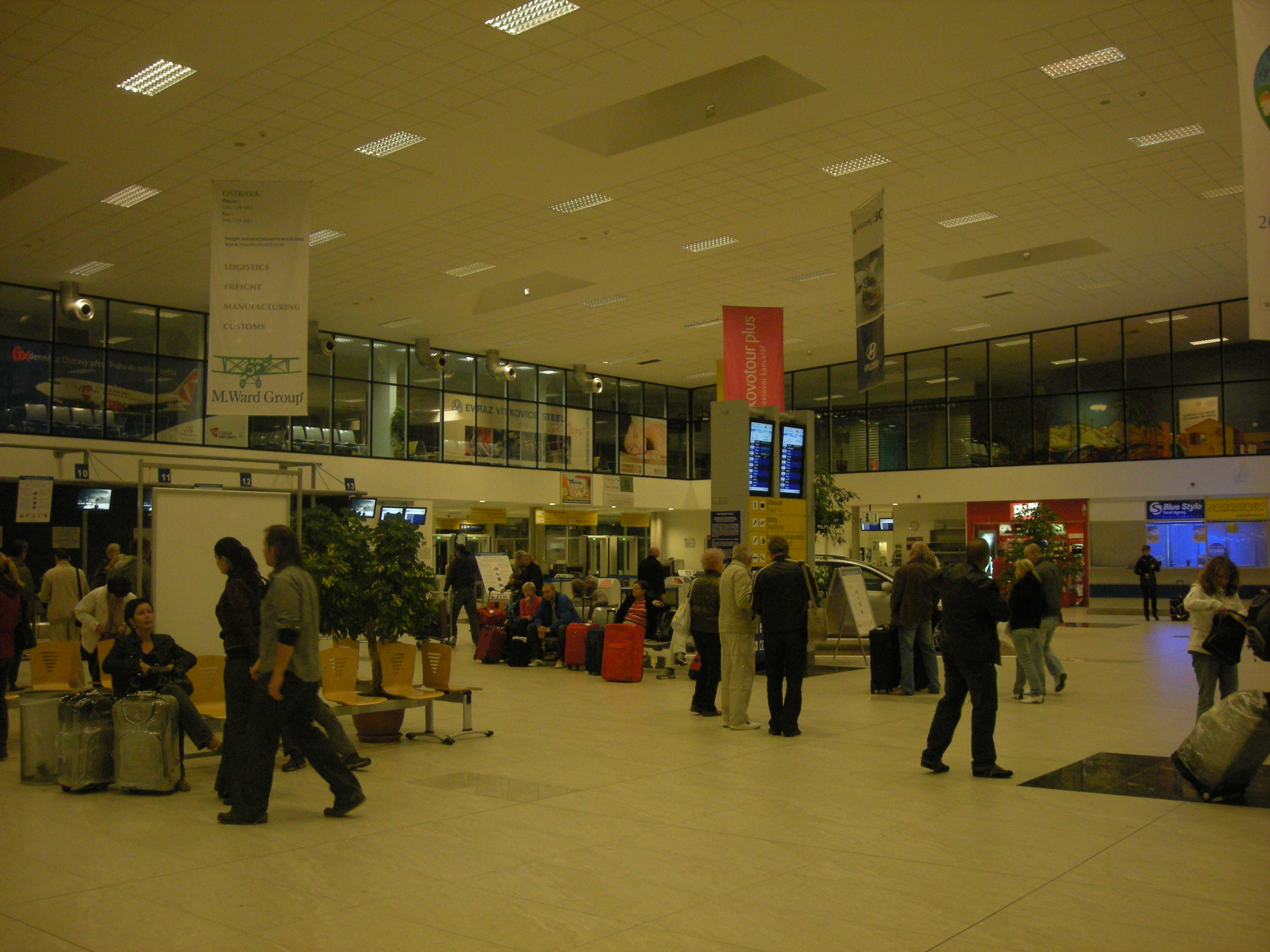
Terminal interior

OSR currently has two terminal buildings. The newer one was opened on 13 December 2006, and is used for departures. The arrival hall referred to the former 1959 terminal, was in use for both departing and arriving passengers until 2006.

=== Departure hall ===
The new terminal officially opened for business on 13 December 2006. The departure hall, consists of six gates in two levels: A1–A3 and B1–B3. Lower level, which consists of gates: A1–A3 is used by Ryanair and Smartwings for flights outside the Schengen Area. It contains customs facilities capable of processing departure international aircraft. Upper level, which consists of gates: B1–B3 is used by LOT Polish Airlines and Smartwings. Flights to destinations within the Schengen Area operate from these gates. Gate B2 also contains customs facilities capable of processing departing Ryanair flights to London.

=== Arrival hall ===
The former terminal building was the only concourse at the airport in operation from 1959 until 2006. It contains customs and Immigration facilities capable of processing arriving international aircraft. The arrival hall has baggage claim facilities, airport baggage office and rental car offices. Passengers arriving from destinations within Schengen Area proceed through one-way doors into the main arrival hall. For international arrivals, the doors are closed, forcing deplaning passengers through different one-way doors and a corridor. The corridor leads into the customs an immigration facility. After being processed, passengers proceed into the main arrival hall.

== Airlines and destinations ==
=== Passenger ===
The following airlines operate regular scheduled and seasonal flights to and from Ostrava:

Airlines	Destinations
HelloJets	Seasonal charter: Djerba, Enfidha, Hurghada, Marsa Alam
LOT Polish Airlines	Warsaw–Chopin
Neos	Seasonal charter: Mauritius, Phuket
Ryanair	Girona, London–Stansted, Málaga
Smartwings	Seasonal: Antalya, Burgas, Corfu, Heraklion, Hurghada, Lamezia Terme, Kos, Marsa Alam, Rhodes, Varna, Zakynthos; Seasonal charter: Barcelona, Dalaman, Djerba, Marsa Matrouh, Monastir, Murcia, Palma de Mallorca, Preveza/Lefkada, Tirana
SunExpress	Seasonal: Antalya

=== Cargo ===
Airlines	Destinations
DHL Aviation	Leipzig/Halle
SkyTaxi	Different charter destinations
Supernova Airlines	Liège
UPS Airlines	Cologne/Bonn
Uzbekistan Airways	Shanghai–Pudong, Shijiazhuang

== Statistics ==
Year	Passengers handled	Passenger % change	Cargo (tonnes)	Cargo % change	Aircraft movements	% change
2014	297,691		5,180		15,069	
2015	308,933	▲3.77	6,469	▲24.88	19,002	▲26.09
2016	258,223	▼ -16.41	4,152	▼ -35.81	20,746	▲9.17
2017	324,116	▲25.51	5,363	▲29.16	20,639	▼ -0.51
2018	377,936	▲16.60	5,448	▲1.58	23,942	▲16.00
2019	323,320	▼ -14.45	8,392	▲54.03	24,560	▲2.58
2020	37,709	▼ -88.33	14,228	▲69.54	18,927	▼ -22.93
2021	137,558	▲264.78	18,225	▲28.09	21,442	▲13.28
2022	286,393	▲108.19	15,490	▼ -15.00	20,939	▼ -2.34
2023	342,932	▲19.74	14,123	▼ -8.82		
2024	493,757	▲43.98	22,483	▲59.00		
2025	506,201	▲2,52	19,463	▼13.43		

== Ground transport ==
=== Road ===
The airport is located close to the Road I/58 from Rožnov pod Radhoštěm to Ostrava and European route E462. Airport also offers valet parking and a meet-and-greet service.

=== Bus ===
There are regular bus services directly linking the airport with Ostrava, Dubina and Ostrava, Náměstí Republiky (lines AE, 331, 641, 664 and 670), Ostrava, Sad Boženy Němcové (line 331), Frýdek-Místek (line 355), Kopřivnice (lines 632 and 641), Frenštát pod Radhoštěm (line 664) and Nový Jičín (line 670). It is possible to pay by a credit card on the bus.

=== Rail ===
Mošnov, Ostrava Airport Railway station is situated next to the terminal building. Services to Ostrava are on the České dráhy train to and from Ostrava-Svinov and furthermore to and from Ostrava hlavní nádraží (The Main train station). Ostrava-Svinov is served by the tram, local bus services, coach services offering access throughout Ostrava and the neighbourhoods. Ostrava hlavní nádraží is served by the tram, trolleybuses and also by the coach services. Other towns serviced by this train line are Studénka, Příbor, Kopřivnice or Štramberk.

== See also ==
- List of airports in the Czech Republic
