= Svinov =

Borough of Ostrava, Czech Republic

Coordinates: 49°48′58″N 18°11′52″E

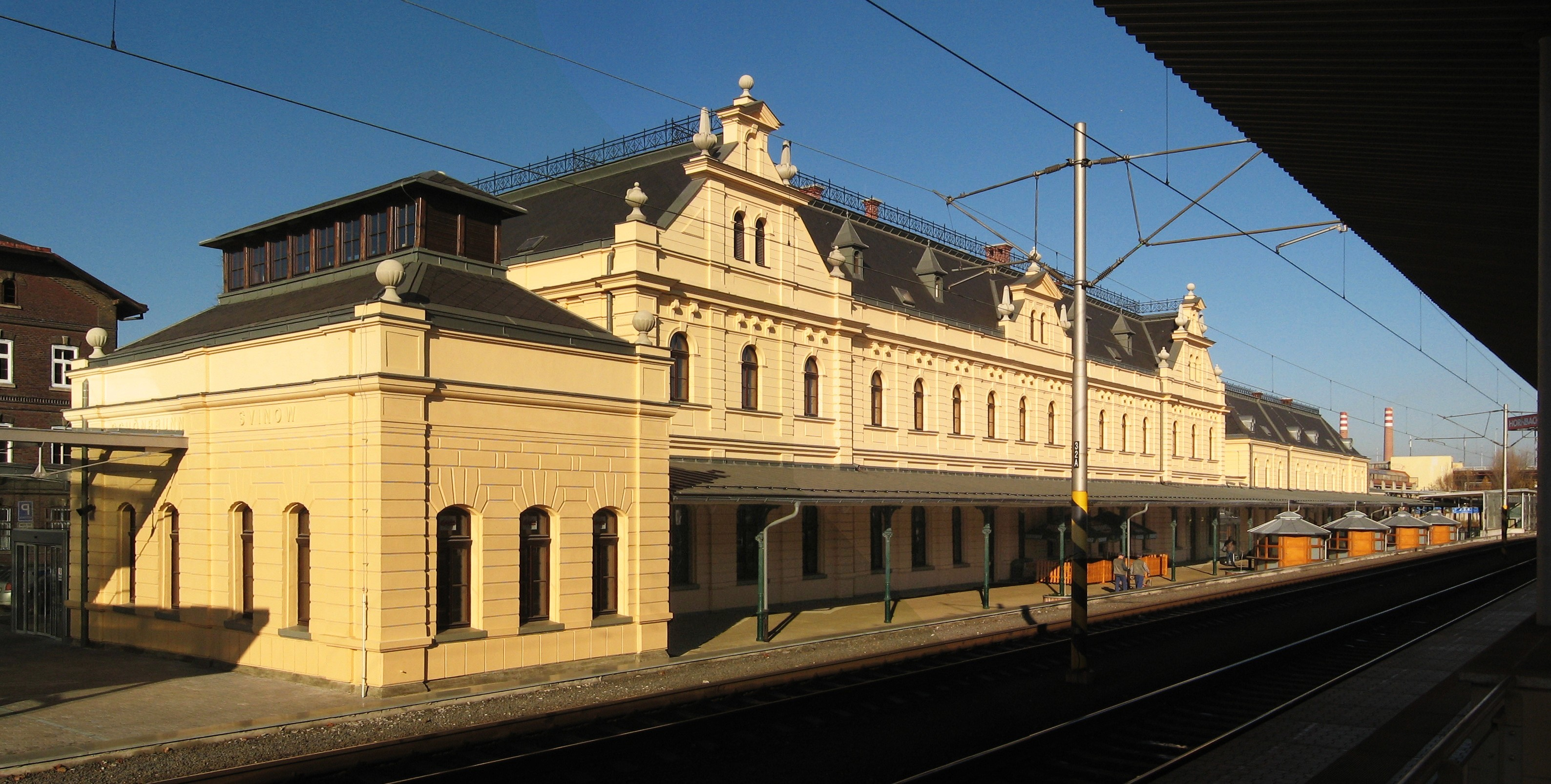
Train station in Svinov

Svinov (German: Schönbrunn) is a borough and municipal part of Ostrava in the Moravian-Silesian Region of the Czech Republic. It was a separate town, but it merged with Ostrava on 20 March 1957. It lies on the bank of the Oder River, in the Silesian part of the city. As of 2011 census, Svinov had population of 4,301.

== History ==
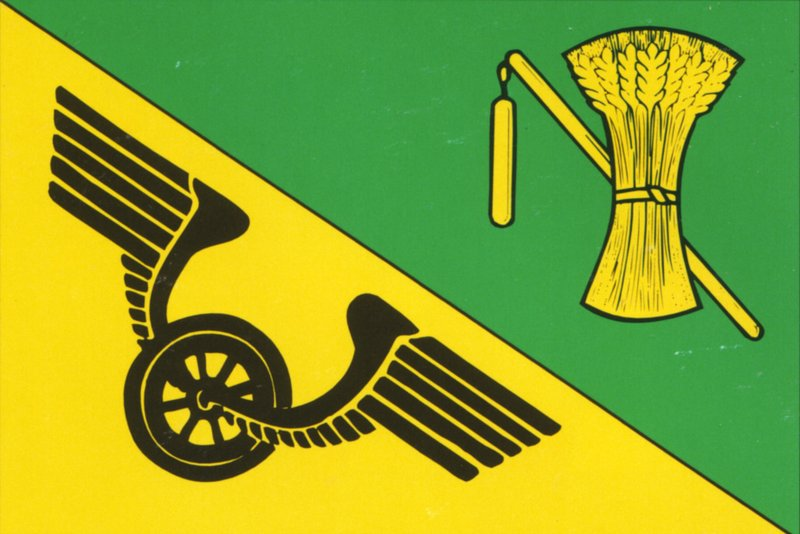
Flag of Svinov

First buildings were established in the valley of the Porubka Stream, a left tributary of the Oder River. Settlement continued to expand in all directions with the years and also solitudes were established, one of them lies right next to the Oder River. First mention appeared in written document by bishop of Olomouc, Bruno von Schauenburg, in 1265, described as monastery village of the Cistercian monastery in Velehrad.

In 1936, Svinov was promoted to a town, and since 1957 is one of municipal parts of the city of Ostrava. Mostly German Svinov was connected to Nazi Third Reich in 1938 as part of the Sudetenland. Svinov was liberated by the Red Army during the World War II on 30 April 1945.

In 1847 a railway station was built, and Svinov became an important railway junction on the Austrian Northern Railway. Quick industrialization followed and several transport companies were established. Since then Svinov railway station has been connected to several other railway lines and today it is the most important railway station in the city of Ostrava.

According to the Austrian census of 1910 the village had 3,274 inhabitants, 3,144 of whom had permanent residence there. Census asked people for their native language; 706 (22.5%) were German-speaking, 2,264 (72%) were Czech-speaking, and 174 (5.5%) were Polish-speaking. Jews were not allowed to declare Yiddish, most of them thus declared the German language as their native. The most populous religious groups were Roman Catholics with 3,075 (93.9%), followed by the Jews with 124 (3.8%).

== Notable people ==
- Jan Foltys (1908–1952), chess player
