= Elipsos =

Spanish railway logistics company

Elipsos Internacional S.A. was a Spanish company. It was set up in 2001 by Renfe and SNCF, with each owning 50%. It was created to handle the logistics of Trenhotel night railway services between Spain and France, Switzerland and Italy. In 2013 only services to France remained; they declined to thrice weekly in September 2013, and discontinued on 15 December as the high speed line between France and Spain had opened. The Elipsos Trenhotel operated with Talgo gauge change trains.

Between December 2013 and December 2022, Elipsos handled high-speed trains between France and Spain, labeled "Renfe-SNCF in Cooperation".

== Services ==
=== Trains ===
- Paris Gare de Lyon - Barcelona (operated by SNCF TGV)
- Lyon Part-Dieu - Barcelona (operated by Renfe AVE)
- Marseille - Madrid (operated by Renfe AVE)

The Francisco de Goya departed Paris every night except Saturday during summer months and less frequently during winter. As of September 2013 it ran from Madrid only on Thursdays, Fridays and Sundays, with return service from Paris on Fridays, Sundays, and Mondays.

The Joan Miró departed Paris every night headed to Barcelona. These trains customers offered dinner and breakfast in the dining car. As of September 2013, the train ran from Barcelona only on Thursdays, Fridays and Sundays, with return service from Paris on Fridays, Sundays, and Mondays.

=== Former trains ===
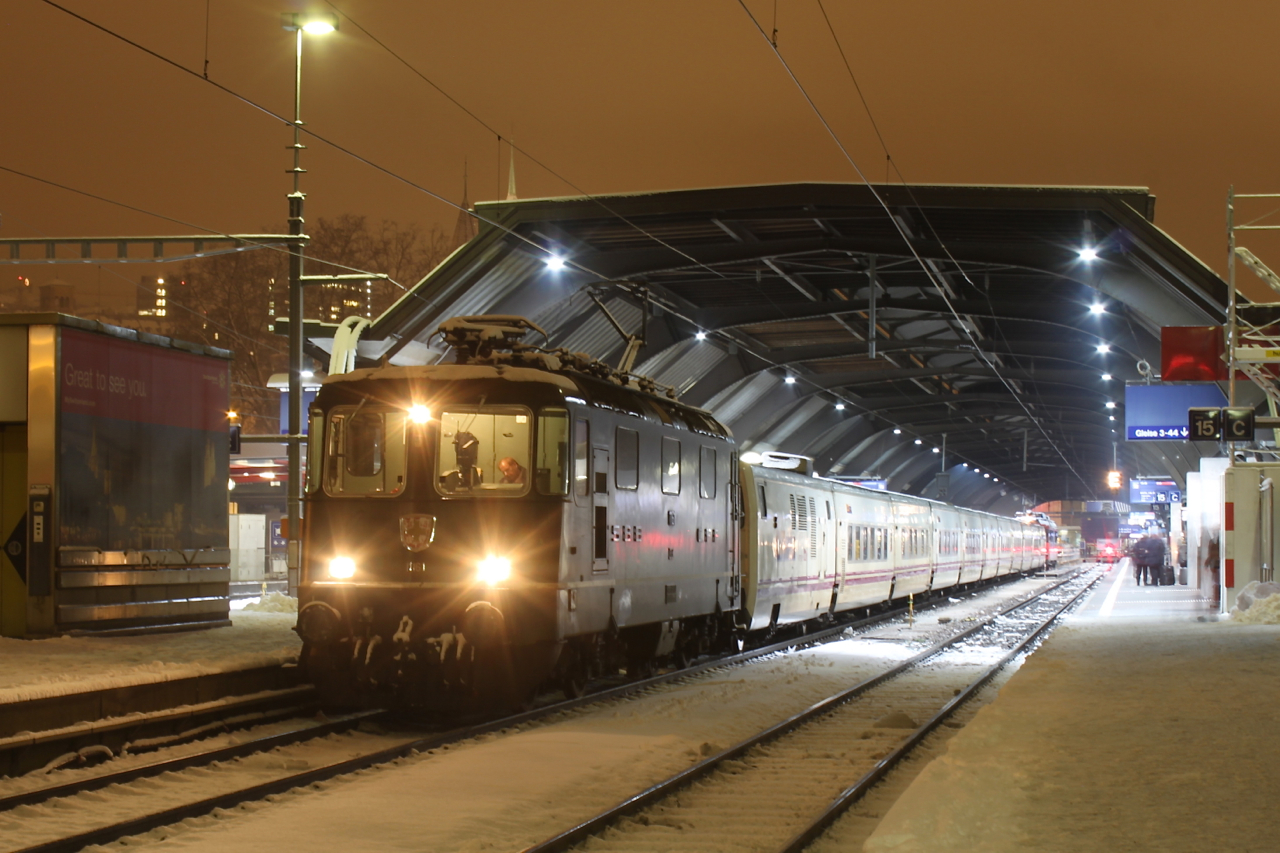
Pau Casals at Zurich HB

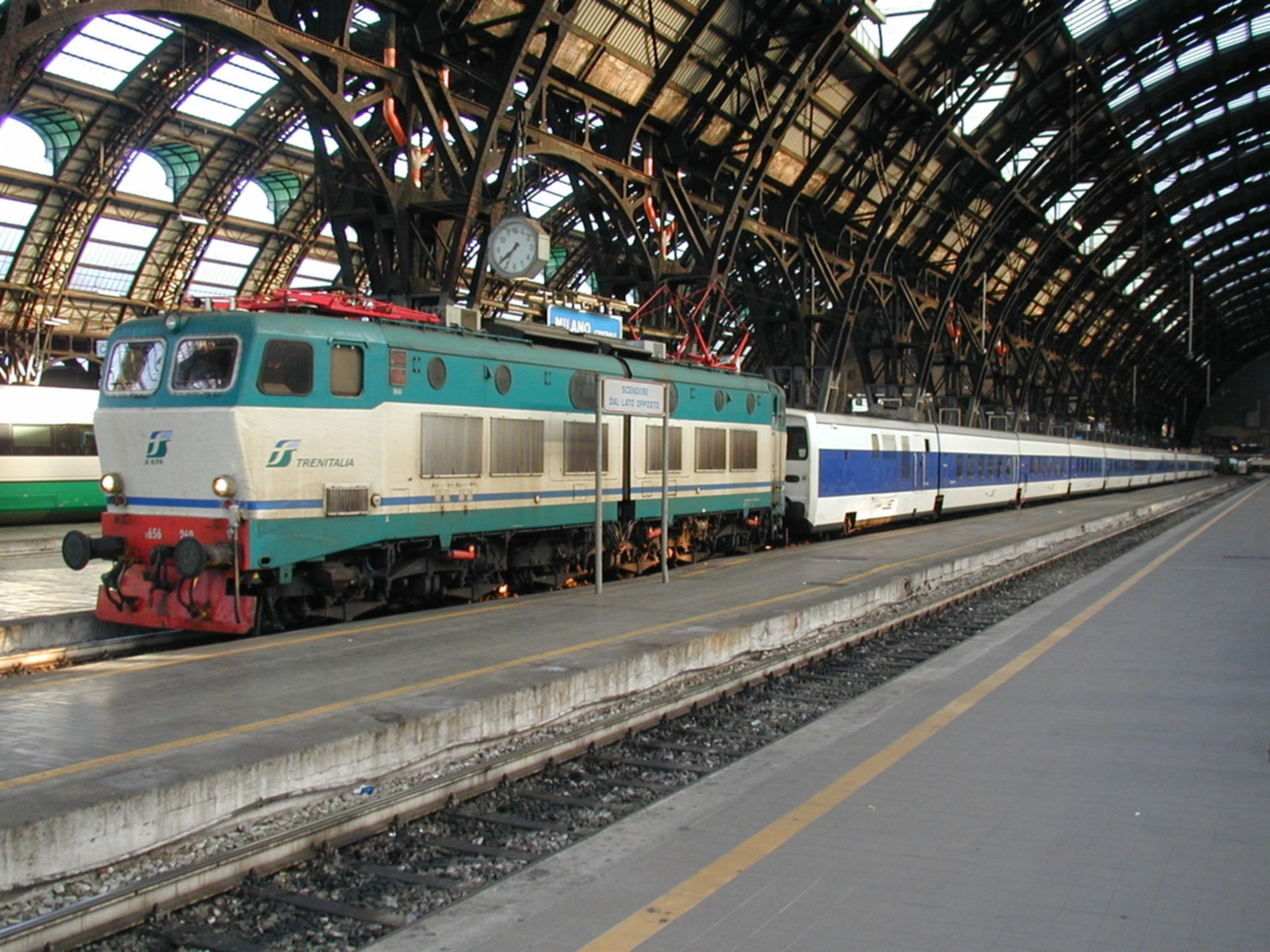
Salvador Dalí at Milan Centrale

- Francisco de Goya (Madrid Chamartin-Paris Austerlitz) (ended December 2013)
- Joan Miró (Barcelona Estació de França-Paris Austerlitz) (ended December 2013)
- Pau Casals (Barcelona Estació de França -Zürich Hauptbahnhof) (ended 7 December 2012)
- Salvador Dalí (Barcelona Estació de França -Milano Centrale) (ended 7 December 2012)
- Renfe-SNCF (Toulouse - Barcelona) (suspended 2020 due to COVID-19, ended 2021)

== Operations ==
The Elipsos bed carriages were operated by Compagnie Internationale des Wagons-Lits and by the various national railway companies. In France the train was pulled by an SNCF locomotive, in Spain by a Renfe one, in Italy by a Trenitalia one and in Switzerland by a SBB CFF FFS one.

The trains generally had four classes:

- Reclining seat
- Tourist Class (4-bed accommodation)
- Club Class (1- or 2-bed accommodation with breakfast included)
- Grand Class (1- or 2-bed accommodation with shower/WC, dinner and breakfast included)
