= Zásmuky =

- Town
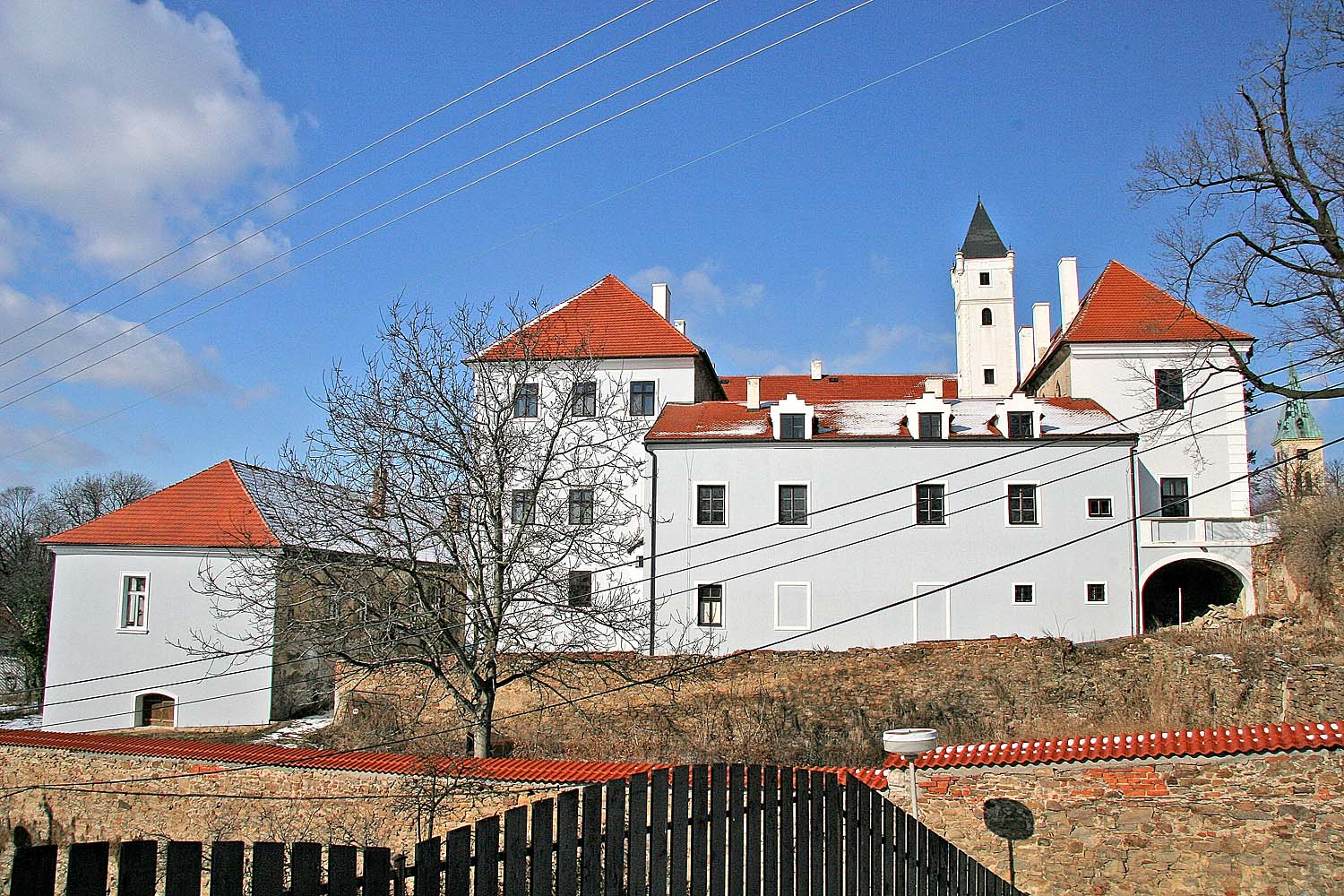
- Zásmuky Castle

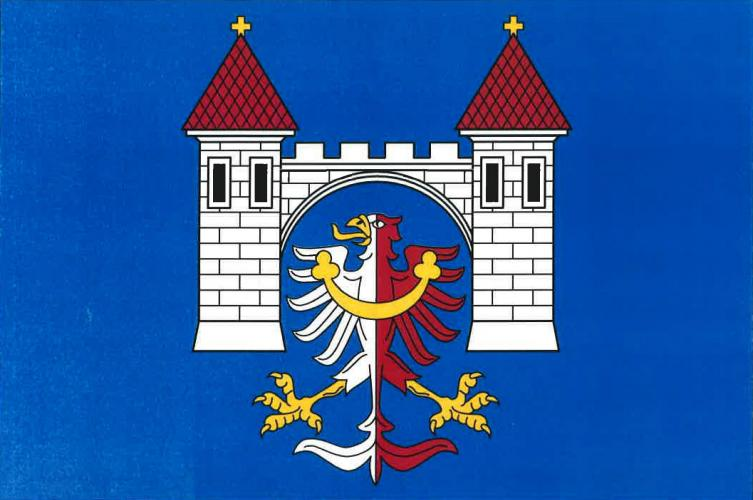
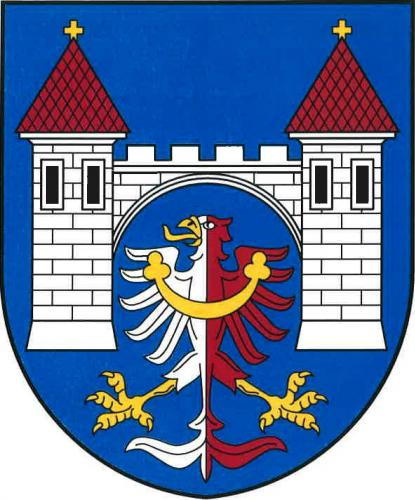
- Flag Coat of arms

- Location in the Czech Republic
- Coordinates: 49°57′17″N 15°1′50″E
- Country: Czech Republic
- Region: Central Bohemian
- District: Kolín
- First mentioned: 1285

Government
  - Mayor: Marta Vaňková

Area
  - Total: 24.12 km^{2} (9.31 sq mi)
- Elevation: 340 m (1,120 ft)

Population (2026-01-01)
  - Total: 2,182
  - Density: 90.46/km^{2} (234.3/sq mi)
- Time zone: UTC+1 (CET)
  - Summer (DST): UTC+2 (CEST)
- Postal code: 281 44
- Website: www.zasmuky.cz

Zásmuky (Czech pronunciation: [ˈzaːsmukɪ]) is a town in Kolín District in the Central Bohemian Region of the Czech Republic. It has about 2,200 inhabitants.

== Administrative division ==
Zásmuky consists of five municipal parts (in brackets population according to the 2021 census):

- Zásmuky (1,502)
- Doubravčany (175)
- Nesměň (178)
- Sobočice (147)
- Vršice (21)

== Etymology ==
The origin and meaning of the name is unknown. It could be a pre-Slavic name, distorted into a Slavic form.

== Geography ==
Zásmuky is located about 14 kilometres (9 mi) southwest of Kolín and 37 km (23 mi) east of Prague. It lies mostly in the Upper Sázava Hills, only a small part of the municipal territory in the north extends into the Central Elbe Table. The highest point is at 406 m (1,332 ft) above sea level. The Výrovka River flows through the western part of the municipal territory. The Špandava Stream originates south of the town, supplies a system of several small fishponds on the western outskirts of the town, and then joins the Výrovka northwest of the town.

== History ==
The first written mention of Zásmuky is from 1285. In 1542, during the rule of Adam of Říčany, the village was promoted to a town. From 1637 to 1948, Zásmuky was continuously owned by the Sternberg family.

== Demographics ==
Historical population

| Year | Pop. | ±% |
|---|---|---|
| 1869 | 3,175 | — |
| 1880 | 3,366 | +6.0% |
| 1890 | 3,532 | +4.9% |
| 1900 | 3,527 | −0.1% |
| 1910 | 3,316 | −6.0% |

| Year | Pop. | ±% |
|---|---|---|
| 1921 | 3,108 | −6.3% |
| 1930 | 3,073 | −1.1% |
| 1950 | 2,281 | −25.8% |
| 1961 | 2,245 | −1.6% |
| 1970 | 2,125 | −5.3% |

| Year | Pop. | ±% |
|---|---|---|
| 1980 | 1,936 | −8.9% |
| 1991 | 1,814 | −6.3% |
| 2001 | 1,709 | −5.8% |
| 2011 | 1,813 | +6.1% |
| 2021 | 2,023 | +11.6% |

Source: Censuses

== Transport ==
The I/2 road (the section from Prague to Kutná Hora) runs through the town.

== Sights ==
The main landmark is the Zásmuky Castle. It was built in the first half of the 16th century. It is a Baroque building with late Renaissance elements and pseudo-Gothic façade. Today the castle is owned by descendants of the Sternberg family and it houses an exhibition about the town of Zásmuky. There is a castle park next to the castle, which is freely accessible.

The Church of the Assumption of the Virgin Mary was built in the neo-Romanesque style in 1900–1903. It was built on the site of an older church, from which a late Baroque chapel from the 18th century survived.

The Baroque complex of the former Franciscan monastery with the Church of the Stigmatization of St. Francis of Assisi was built in 1691–1694. Today it serves cultural and social purposes.

== Notable people ==
- František Kmoch (1848–1912), composer and conductor
