= Mošnov =

- Municipality
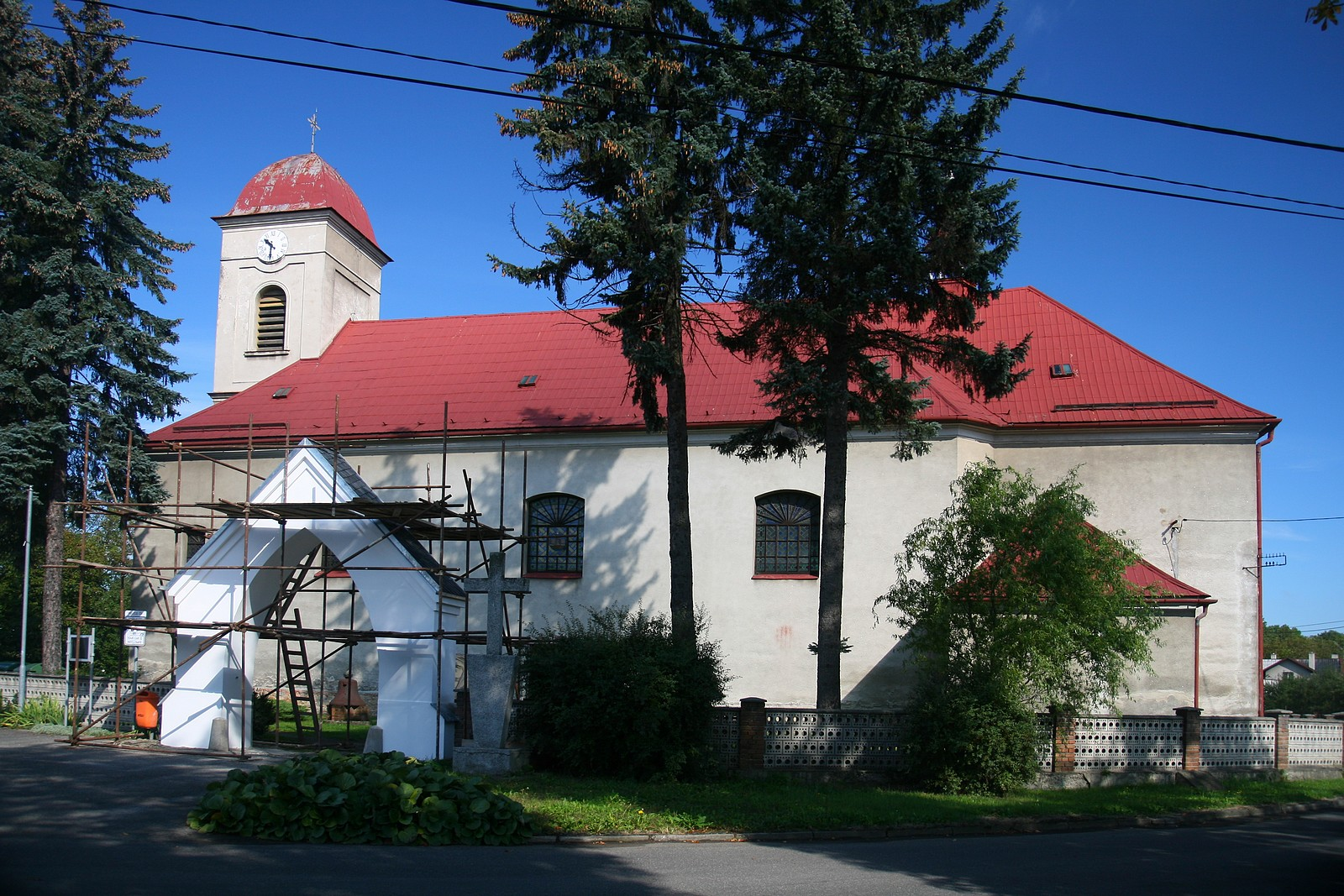
- Church of Saint Margaret

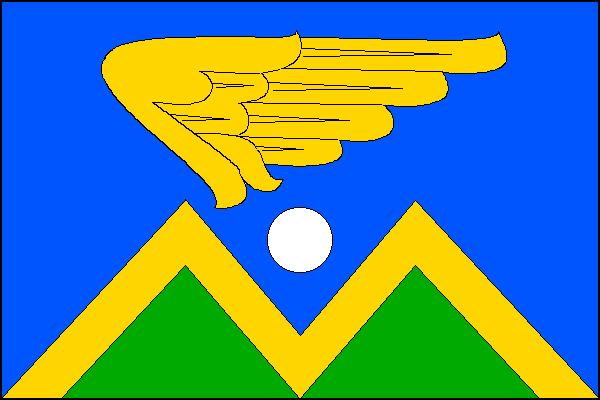
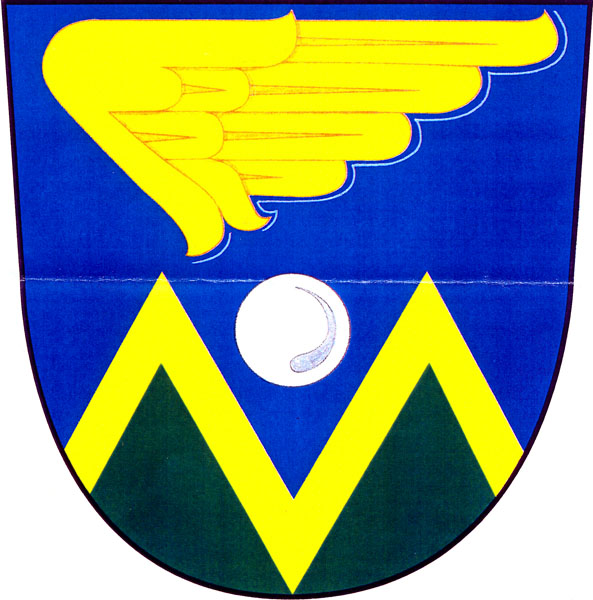
- Flag Coat of arms

- Location in the Czech Republic
- Coordinates: 49°41′21″N 18°7′57″E
- Country: Czech Republic
- Region: Moravian-Silesian
- District: Nový Jičín
- First mentioned: 1374

Area
  - Total: 12.07 km^{2} (4.66 sq mi)
- Elevation: 253 m (830 ft)

Population (2026-01-01)
  - Total: 751
  - Density: 62.2/km^{2} (161/sq mi)
- Time zone: UTC+1 (CET)
  - Summer (DST): UTC+2 (CEST)
- Postal code: 742 51
- Website: www.mosnov.cz

Mošnov (German: Engelswald) is a municipality and village in Nový Jičín District in the Moravian-Silesian Region of the Czech Republic. It has about 800 inhabitants.

== History ==
The first written mention of Mošnov is from 1367.

== Demographics ==
Historical population
Year	Pop.	±%
1869	789	—
1880	815	+3.3%
1890	843	+3.4%
1900	833	−1.2%
1910	899	+7.9%
1921	859	−4.4%
1930	885	+3.0%
1950	891	+0.7%
1961	916	+2.8%
1970	771	−15.8%
1980	776	+0.6%
1991	713	−8.1%
2001	677	−5.0%
2011	688	+1.6%
2021	749	+8.9%
Source: Censuses

== Transport ==
The main part of Leoš Janáček Airport Ostrava, the third largest airport in the country, is located in Mošnov. It was built in 1955–1960.
