= 13th Africa Movie Academy Awards =

2017 film awards ceremony

- Date: 15 July 2017
- Site: Eko Hotels and Suites, Lagos, Lagos State, Nigeria
- Hosted by: Nse Ikpe-Etim
- Organized by: Africa Film Academy

Highlights
- Best Film: Félicité
- Most awards: Félicité (6)
- Most nominations: Vaya (12)

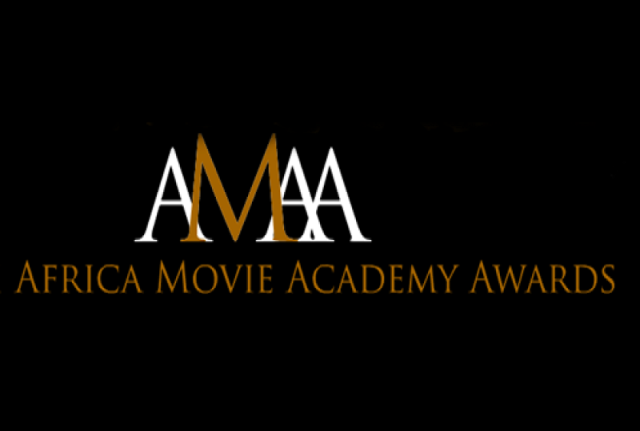

The 13th Africa Movie Academy Awards ceremony was held on 15 July 2017 at Eko Hotel and Suites, Lagos, Nigeria.

== Awards ==
Winners are listed first and highlighted in boldface.

Best Film	Best Director
**Félicité** – Senegal; The Last of Us (film) - Tunisia; A Mile in My Shoes (film) – Morocco; '76 (film) - Nigeria; Vaya - South Africa; 93 Days - Nigeria; Queen of Katwe - Uganda; Wulu (film) – Mali; Call Me Thief – South Africa	**Akin Omotoso** - Vaya; Daouda Coulibaly - Wulu; Steve Gukas – 93 Days; Mira Nair - Queen of Katwe; Izu Ojukwu - 76; Daryen Joshua- Call Me Thief; Alain Gomis - Félicité; Ala Eddine Slim- The Last Of Us; Said Khallaf - A Mile in My Shoes (film)
Best Actor in a leading role	Best Actress in a leading role
**Jahwar Soudani** - Last Of Us; Sambassa Nzeribe – Slow Country; Ibrahim Koma – Wulu; Richard Mofe Damijo - Oloibiri; Amine Ennaji- A Mile in My Shoes (film); David Oyelowo – Queen of Katwe; Dann Jaques Mouton- Call Me Thief; Ramsey Nouah – 76	**Véro Tshanda Beya Mputu** - Félicité; Lydia Forson - Keteke; Lupita Nyong'o – Queen of Katwe; Bimbo Akintola – 93 Days; Josette Bushell-Mingo – While We Live; Rita Dominic – 76; Khabonina Quebeka – Dora’s Peace; Zimkhitha Nyoka - Vaya
Best Actor in a Supporting Role	Best Actress in a Supporting Role
**Papi Mpaka -** Félicité; Adonijah Owiriwa - 76; Warren Matsimola - Vaya; Olu Jacobs - Oloibiri; Richard Seruwazi – While We Live; Majid Michel – Slow Country	**Angelique Kidjo** - The CEO; Inna Moja – Wulu; Theresa Edem - Ayamma; Taiwo Ajai Lycet - Oloibiri; Nmonde Mbusi - Vaya; Somkele Idhalama – 93 Days
Achievement in Costume Design	Achievement in Makeup
**Queen of Katwe** - Uganda; Ayamma- Nigeria; Keteke - Ghana; The Last Of Us - Tunisia; Logun Ofe - Nigeria	**Oloibiri** - Nigeria; Dora’s Peace – South Africa; Ayamma- Nigeria; The Last of Us - Tunisia; Slow Country- Nigeria
Achievement in Cinematography	Achievement in Production Design
**The Last of Us** - Tunisia; The Whale Caller – South Africa; Félicité - Senegal; Vaya- South Africa; A Mile in My Shoes (film) - Morocco	**76** – Nigeria; Call Me Thief – South Africa; Félicité - Senegal; Queen of Katwe - Uganda; The Last of Us- Tunisia
Achievement in Editing	Achievement in Screenplay
**Félicité** - Senegal; Call Me Thief - South Africa; Vaya – South Africa; While We Live – Burkina Faso/Sweden; The CEO - Nigeria	**Vaya** – South Africa; Oloibiri - Nigeria; Dora’s Peace- South Africa; Félicité – Senegal; While We Live- Burkina Faso/Sweden
Best Film in An African Language	Best Nigerian Film
**Félicité** – Senegal; Logun Ofe - Nigeria; Call Me Thief – South Africa; Vaya – South Africa	**76**; Green White Green; 93 Days; The CEO; Ayamma; Oloibiri
Best Short Film	Best Animation
**A Place for Myself** – Rwanda co-winner; **A Place in the Plane** – Senegal co-winner; Bout – Nigeria; On Monday Last Week – Ghana/USA; Silence - Nigeria; Kieza - Angola; Yemoja: Rise of the Orisa- Nigeria/UK; Marabout – Senegal	**Got Flowers** - Nigeria; Black Barbie – Ghana; Gyrow – Nigeria; Pull – Nigeria
Best Documentary	Best Film by an African Living Abroad
**Mama Colonel** – DRC; Legacy Of The Hills – Mali; Makoko: Future Afloat - Nigeria; House in the Field – Morocco; Vivre Riche – Cote D’Ivoire; House of Nwapa – Nigeria; The African Who Wanted To Fly – Gabon; La Colere Dans Le Vent (Anger in the Wind) - Niger	**While We Live** – Burkina Faso/Sweden; Saving Dreams – Nigeria/Canada; Theory of Conflict- Nigeria/USA; A Mile in My Shoes (film) – Morocco/Canada; Hell’s Fury- Nigeria/USA
Best Diaspora Short	Best Diaspora Documentary
**90 Days** - USA co-winner; **Kbela** – Brazil co-winner; Ca$h Out – USA; The Tale of Four – Curacao	**13th** - USA; I Am Not Your Negro – Haiti/France; Les heritiers du Vietnam (Martinique); Horace Tapscott, Musical Griot - USA
Best Diaspora Feature	Best Soundtrack
**Birth of a Nation** - USA; West Indies Gang - Guadeloupe; Fences – USA; Double Play (film) – Curacao; Moonlight – USA	**Félicité** - Senegal; Vaya – South Africa; 93 Days- Nigeria; A Mile in My Shoes (film)- Morocco; 76 - Nigeria; While We Live- Burkina Faso/Sweden
Best Visual Effects	Best Sound
**Wulu** - Mali; Oloibiri- Nigeria; Whale Caller – South Africa; Queen of Katwe - Uganda; Slow Country – Nigeria	**Vaya** – South Africa; 93 Days – Nigeria; Félicité – Senegal; Wulu- Mali; Dora’s Peace – South Africa
Most Promising Actor	Best First Feature Film by a Director
**Madina Nalwanga** – Queen of Katwe; Paballo Koza – Dora’s Peace; Azwille Shanane-Madiba - Vaya; Austin Rose – Call Me Thief; Adam Kanyama– While We Live	**Wulu – Daouda Coulibaly** – Mali; Happiness is a Four Letter Word –Thabang Molaya- South Africa; Green White Green – Abba Makama - Nigeria; Bunjoko – Kizito Samuel - Uganda; The Last Of Us – Alaeddine Slim – Tunisia; Rain – Daniel Mugerwa - Uganda
