= 2017 Africa Magic Viewers' Choice Awards =

Television and film award event in Nigeria

5th Africa Magic Viewers Choice Awards
- Date: 5 March 2017
- Site: Eko Hotels and Suites, Victoria Island, Lagos, Lagos State, Nigeria
- Organized by: Multichoice Africa

The 2017 Africa Magic Viewers Choice Awards (AMVCA) was held on March 5, 2017, at the Eko Hotels and Suites in Victoria Island, Lagos, Nigeria.

Nominees were revealed on December 14, 2016. In the event, Several top stars and top movies were nominated part of which was the movie '76 got a record-breaking 14 nominations.

== Awards ==
Best Movie (South Africa)	Best Movie (East Africa)
All About Love (Elvis Chuks); Mrs Right Guy (Dumisani Gumbi); Happiness Is a Four-letter Word (Bongiwe Selane, Junaid Ahmed, Helena Spring); Vaya (Rethabile Molatela Mothobi); The Jakes Are Missing (Bianca Isaac)	Kati Kati (Sarika Hemi Lakhani); Aisha (Amil Shivji); Naomba Niseme (Staford Kihore); Epidemic (Mageye Hassan); Homecoming (Seko Shamte)
Best Supporting Actress	Best Supporting Actor Movie/TV series
Ebele Okaro (Four One Love); Ivie Okujaye (Something Wicked); Somkele Iyamah(93 Days); Adunni Ade (It's her day); Kehinde Bankole (8 bars and clef); Hanyi Mbau (Happiness Is a Four-letter Word); Nomonde Mbusi (Vaya)	Rotimi Salami (Just Not Married); Gideon Okeke (93 Days); Warren Vasemole (Vaya); Kofi Adjorlolo (Ghana Must Go); Mpho Sebeng (The Jakes Are Missen); Nkem Owoh (Ghana Must Go)
Best Art Director	Best Sound Track
'76 (Pat Nebo); 93 Days (Bola Bello); Oloibiri (film) (Chima Adighije); Happiness Is a Four-letter Word (Gary Smith); Ghana Must Go (film) (Godwin Ashong)	The Encounter (Michael ‘The Truth’ Ogunlade); Oloibiri (film) (Rex Ricketts); 93 Days (George Kallis, Tunde Jegede and Banky W); No Good Turn (Brymo); '76 (Hyacinth Ogbu, Daps Agwom, Ukachi Nnachi)
Best Actress in a Drama	Best Actor in a Drama
Rita Dominic ('76); Bimbo Akintola (93 Days); Ivie Okujaye (Slow Country); Adesua Etomi (The Arbitration); Zimkhitha Nyoka (Vaya); Meg Otanwa (Derailed); Hannah Ojo (Love is A Prank); Taiwo Ajai Lycett; Mampo Brescia; Gloria Young; Ireti Doyle; Ade Laoye; Nomzamo Mbatha; Funmi Holder; Michelle Dede; Thembi Nyandeni; Oge Okoye	Sambasa Nzeribe (Slow Country); RMD (Oloibiri); Ramsey Nouah ('76); Gregory Ojefua (The Encounter); Olu Jacobs (Oloibiri); Femi Jacobs (Femi Jacobs); Tumisho Masha; Sdumo Mtshali; Bheki Mkhwane; Gideon Okeke; Iyke Okechukwu; Ayo Lijadu; Akin Lewis; David Jones David; Kelechi Udegbe; Kingsley Nwachukwu
Best Cinematography	Best Actress in a Comedy
Lance Gewer (Happiness Is a Four-letter Word); Adze Ugah (Mrs Right Guy); Yinka Edward (93 Days); Curtis Graham (Oloibiri (film)); Yinka Edward ('76)	Funke Akindele (Jenifa's Diary); Tina Mba (Meet The Inlaws); Uche Jombo (Wives on Strike); Dineo Moeketsi (Mrs Right Guy); Chioma Akpotha (Wives on Strike); Funke Akindele (A Trip to Jamaica); Omoni Oboli (Wives on Strike); Susan Pwajok (Tinsel); Seun Osigbesan, Ada Ameh - The Johnsons; Sola Sobowale, Deborah Anugwa, Stephanie Coker - (Hustle); Kate Henshaw, Monica Friday, Uzor Osimkpa - Do Good
Best Writer	Best Actor in a Comedy
Vaya; '76 (Emmanuel Okomanyi); The CEO (Tunde Babalola); A Trip to Jamaica (Ayo Makun); Oloibiri (film) (Samantha Iwowo); Ghana Must Go (film) (Tunde Babalola)	Imeh Umoh Bishop (The Boss is Mine); Ayo Makun (A Trip to Jamaica); Bovi Ugboma (It's Her Day); Blossom Chukwujekwu (Ghana Must Go); Mike Ezuruonye; Okey Uzoeshi (The Life of a Nigerian Couple); Ameachi Munagor (Meet the In-Laws)
Best Movie West Africa	Best Short Film or Online Video
Oloibiri; 93 Days; '76; A Trip to Jamaica; The CEO	Cat Face (Ogu Okpue); Ireti (Tope Oshin); Loot (Greg Rum)); Meet the Parents (Lonzo); Light Diaries: Spin Around ((Melissa)
Best Documentary	Best Picture Director
Alison; Roots Gambia; Makoko: Futures A float; Amaka's Kin: The Women of Nollywood; Petra's Nebatean Heritage	'76 (Izu Ojukwu); Oloibiri (film); Vaya; Happiness Is a Four-letter Word; 93 Days
Best Costume Design	Best Make Up
'76 (Pat Egwurube); Oloibiri (film); Ghana Must Go (film); Casino; King Invincible	Hakeem Onilogbo Ajibola – Oloibiri (film); Ronwyn Jarrett – Umililo; Thelma Ozzy Smith / Lola Maja-Okojevoh / Adetunmi Imoteda – 93 Days; Diana Allen – Happiness Is a Four-letter Word; Chinwe Elovah – '76
Best Sound Editing	Best Picture Editing
Richard Mohlari / Dave Hawkins – Vaya (film); Mike Barnitt – Oloibiri (film); Pius Fatoke / Mzukisi Mtshiselo – 93 Days; Solomon Emmanuel – '76; Jean Niemandt – Mrs Right Guy	Nnodim Chigozie / Paula Peterson – Oloibiri (film); Vuyani Sondlo – Vaya (film); Emeka Ojukwu – '76; Antonio Ribeiro – 93 Days Movie; Nicholas Costaras / Melanie Jankes Golden – Happiness Is a Four-letter Word
Best Lighting Designer	Best TV series
Elliot Sewape – 93 Days Movie; Amisu Alade / Edwin Lau – Oloibiri (film); Yinka Edwards – '76; Lance Gewer Sasc – Happiness Is a Four-letter Word; Fabian Hooks – A Trip to Jamaica	Jenifa's Diary – Funke Akindele; Sokhulu and Partners Season 3 – Roberta Durrant; Duplicity – Delmwa Deshi Kura; Beneath The Lies – Cedric Ndilima & Nana Kagga; Beyond your Sight – The Police Story – Lancelot Oduwa Imasuen
Best Indigenous Language TV series/movies (Hausa)	Best Indigenous Language TV series/movies (Igbo)
Yaki Da Zuciya – Tijjani Shehu Yahaya; Salim – Abdullahi Abas; Mafarin Tafiya – Nuhu Abdullahi; Maula – Muktar Bello Ismail	Amonye Bu Onye – Crey Ahanonu; Obi-Eze – Kingsley Okereke; Obi Nwanyi – Douye Aaron Garvey; Mmakwara Series – Tiana Oboyi; Ikpe Omuwa – Emeka Ossai
Best Indigenous Language TV series/movies (Yoruba)	Best Indigenous Language TV series/movies (Swahili)
Somewhere in the Dark – Abiodun Jimoh / Jumoke Odetola; Ode Iku – Samsideen Adesiyah; Ajoke Aiye – Olaide Olabanji; Tobajewo – Omirefa Titus; Iman – Oluwatoyin Bankole	Zilizala – Daudi Otieno Anguka; Urembo – Dorothy Ghettuba; Siri Ya Mtungi (Season 2); Mganga Bomba – Gbenga Kayode; Fihi – Victor Gatonye
AMVCA recognition award for MNET original series	Best Overall Film
Best Actress in a comedy – Deborah Anugwa (Hustle); Best Actor in a comedy – Samuel Ajibola (The Johnsons); Best Actress in a drama – Meg Otanwa (Hush); Best Actor in a drama – David Jones David (Hotel Majestic); Best comedy series – The Johnsons; Best drama series – Tinsel (TV series)	'76; Mrs Right Guy; Happiness Is a Four-letter Word; Aisha; 93 Days; Naomba Niseme
Legend Award	Trailblazer Award
Chika Okpala	Somkele Iyamah
