= Azwile Chamane-Madiba =

South African actress

- Born: Azwile Chamane-Madiba; South Africa
- Occupation: Actress
- Known for: Vaya (2016)

Azwile Chamane-Madiba is a South African actress.

== Career ==
In 2016, she played the role of "Zodwa" in Akin Omotoso's film, Vaya, also featuring Phuthi Nakene, Warren Masemola, Nomonde Mbusi, Zimkhitha Nyoka. The film got multiple nominations for the 13th Africa Movie Academy Awards (AMAA) in 2017.

== Filmatography ==
Year	Film	Role	Notes	Ref.
2016	Vaya	Actress (Zodwa)	Drama	
