= Africa Movie Academy Award for Best Actress in a Leading Role =

The Africa Movie Academy Award for Best Actress in a Leading Role is an annual merit by the Africa Film Academy to reward the best female actress in a leading role.

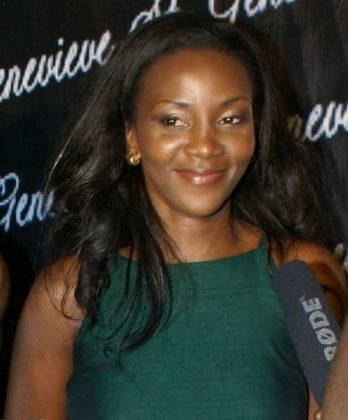
2005 AMAA Best Actress winner Genevieve Nnaji

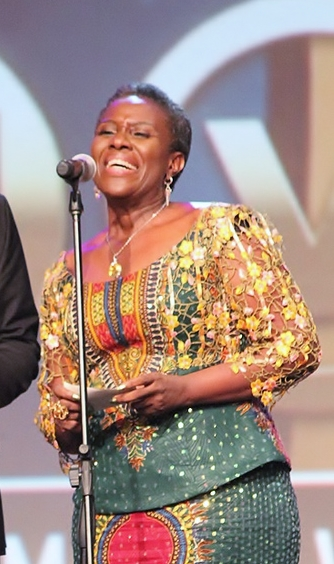
2006 AMAA Best Actress winner Joke Silva

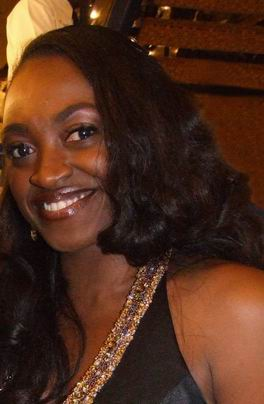
2008 AMAA Best Actress winner Kate Henshaw

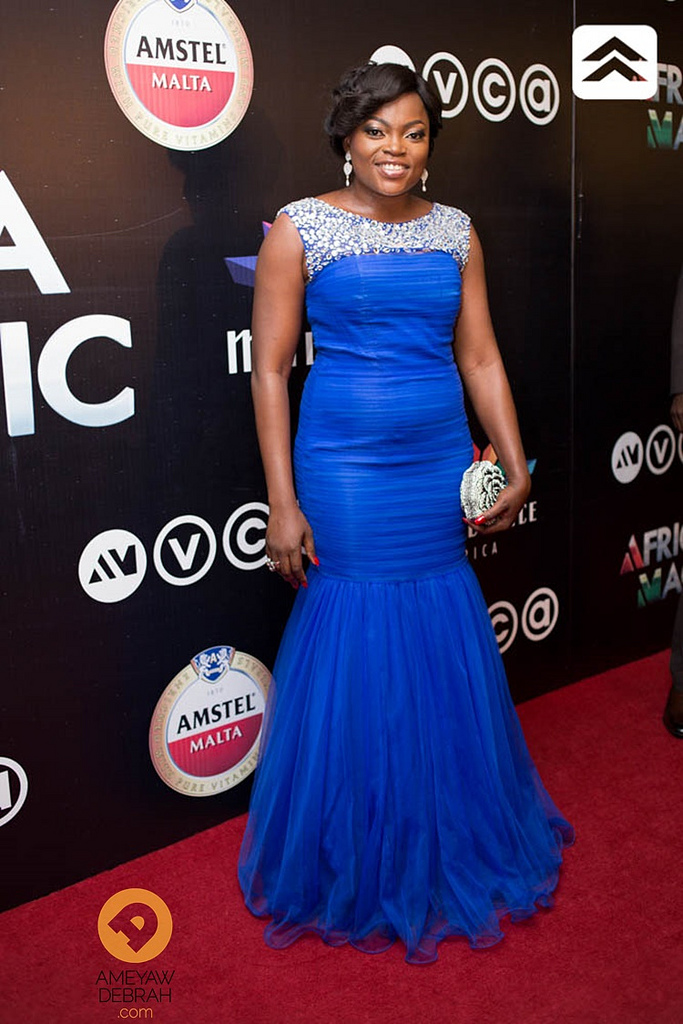
2009 AMAA Best Actress winner Funke Akindele

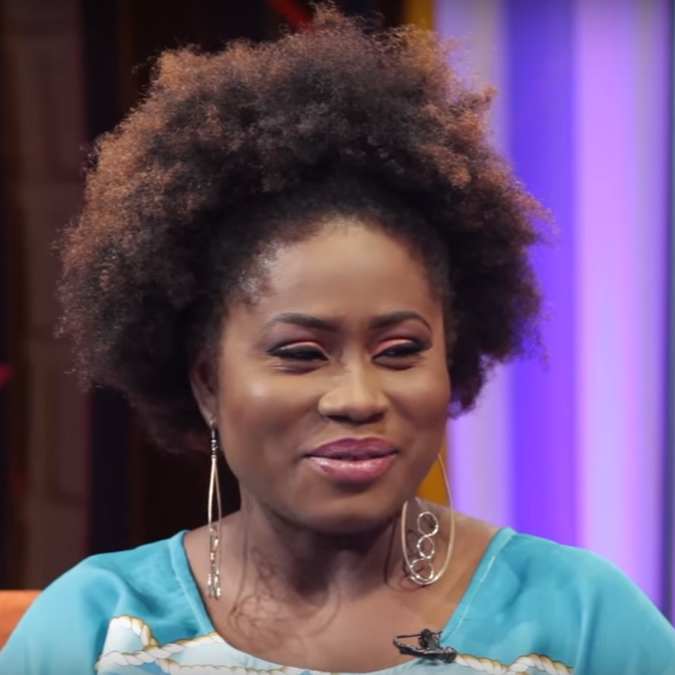
2010 AMAA Best Actress winner Lydia Forson

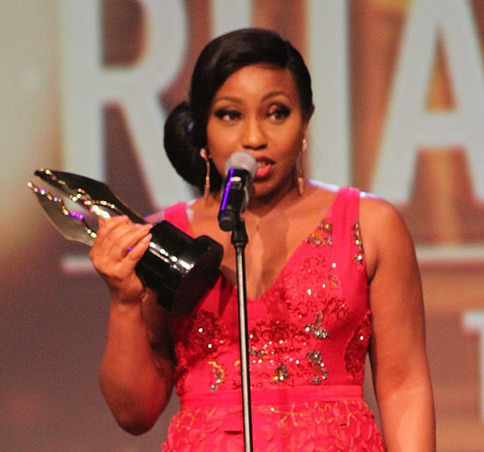
2012 AMAA Best Actress winner Rita Dominic

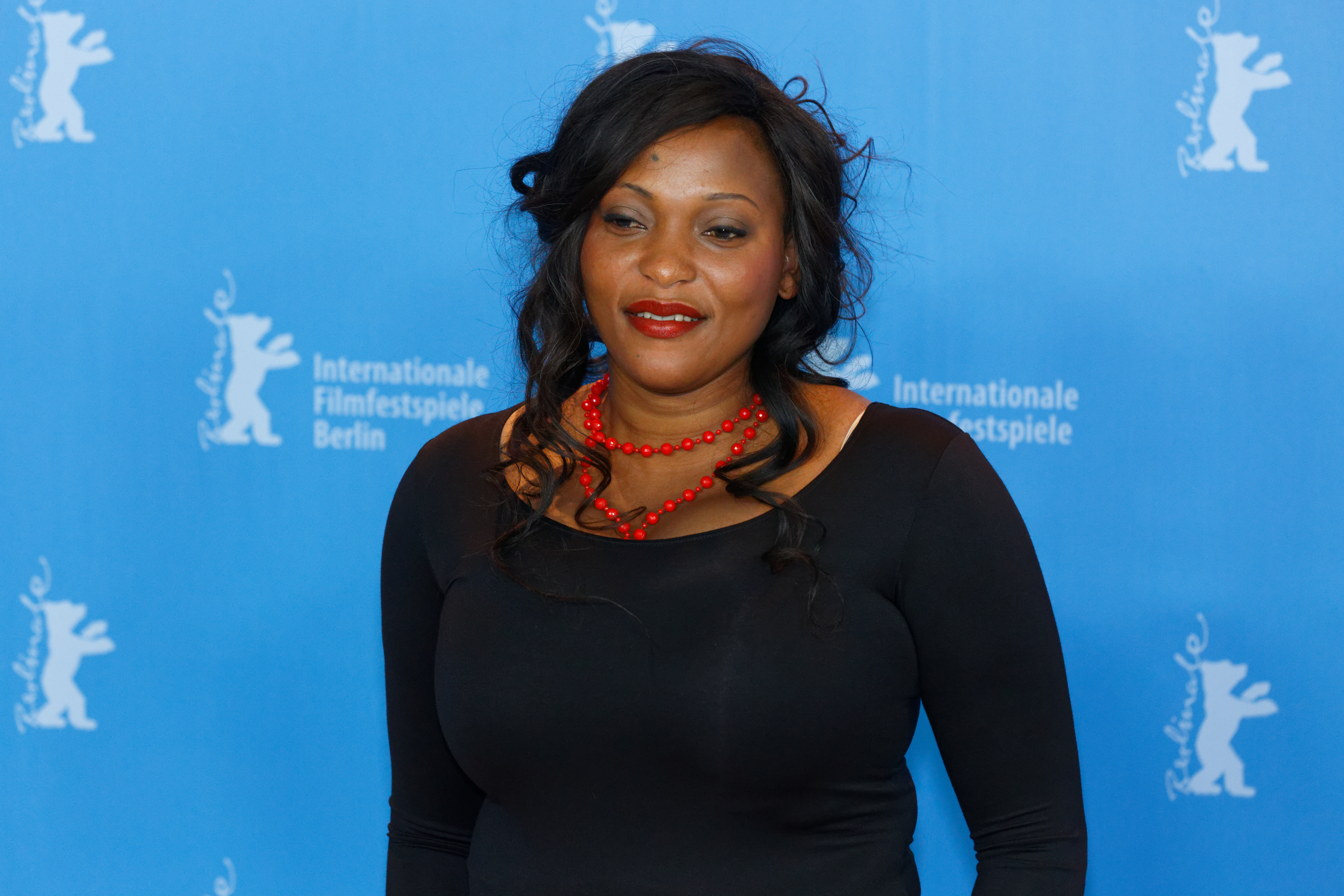
2017 AMAA Best Actress winner Véro Tshanda Beya Mputu

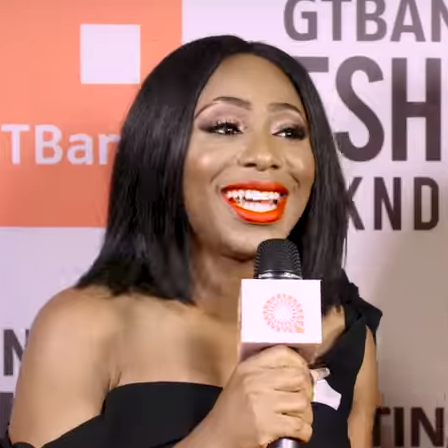
2018 AMAA Best Actress winner Dakore Egbuson-Akande

Best Actress (Lead role)
Year	Nominees	Film	Result
2005	Genevieve Nnaji		Won
2005	Stephanie Okereke		Nominated
2006	Joke Silva	Widow’s Cot	Won
2006	Stella Damasus	Behind Closed Door	Nominated
2006	Onyeka Onwenu	Rising Moon	Nominated
2006	Akofa Asiedu	My Mother’s Heart	Nominated
2006	Alima Qiedraego	Sofia	Nominated
2006	Kudakwashe Maradzika	Tanyaradzwa	Nominated
2007	Chioma Chukwuka	Sins of the Flesh	Won
2007	Nadia Buari	Beyonce: The President's Daughter	Nominated
2007	Khabirat Kafidipe	Iwalewa	Nominated
2008	Kate Henshaw-Nuttal	Stronger Than Pain	Won
2008	Jackie Aygemang	Princess Tyra	Nominated
2008	Stella Damasus-Aboderin	Widow	Nominated
2008	Rakiya Attah	Across the Niger	Nominated
2008	Genevieve Nnaji	30 Days / Keep My Will	Nominated
2009	Funke Akindele	Jenifa	Won
2009	Stephanie Okereke & Nse Ikpe Etim	Reloaded	Nominated
2009	Stella Damasus-Aboderin	State of the Heart	Nominated
2009	Corine Onyango	From a Whisper	Nominated
2009	Nadia Buari	Agony of the Christ	Nominated
2010	Jackie Appiah & Lydia Forson	The Perfect Picture	Won
2010	Bimbo Akintola	Freedom in Chains	Nominated
2010	Stephanie Okereke	Nnenda	Nominated
2010	Flora Suya	Season of a life	Nominated
2010	Akofa Edjeani Asiedu	I Sing of a Well	Nominated
2011	Ama K. Abebrese	Sinking Sands	Won
2011	Genevieve Nnaji	Tango with Me	Nominated
2011	Idiat Shobande	Aramotu	Nominated
2011	Omoni Oboli	Anchor Baby	Nominated
2011	Manie Malone	Viva Riva!	Nominated
2011	Denise Newman	Shirley Adams	Nominated
2012	Rita Dominic	Shattered	Won
2012	Nse Ikpe Etim	Mr. and Mrs.	Nominated
2012	Yvonne Okoro	Single Six	Nominated
2012	Ama K. Abebrese	Ties That Bind	Nominated
2012	Uche Jombo	Damage	Nominated
2012	Millicent Makheido	48	Nominated
2012	Kudzai Sevenzo-Nyarai	Playing Warriors	Nominated
2013	Florence Masebe	Elelwani	Won
2013	Yvonne Okoro	Contract	Nominated
2013	Mariam Ouedraogo	Moi Zaphira	Nominated
2013	Rita Dominic	The Meeting	Nominated
2013	Mbutung Seikeh	Ninah’s Diary	Nominated
2013	Flora Suya	Last Fishing Boat	Nominated
2014	Clarion Chukwura	Apaye	Won
2014	Uche Nnadili	B for Boy	Nominated
2014	Linda Sokhulu	Felix	Nominated
2014	Chioma Chukwuka Akpotha	Accident	Nominated
2014	Uche Jombo Rodriquez, Monalisa Chinda & Daniella Okeke	Lagos Cougars	Nominated
2014	Joselyn Dumas	A Northern Affair	Nominated
2015	Lesliana Pereira	Njinga: Queen of Angola	Won
2015	Queen Nwokoye	Chetanna	Nominated
2015	Aida Wang	Juliet and Romeo	Nominated
2015	Joselyn Dumas	Silverain	Nominated
2015	Ini Edo	While You Slept	Nominated
2016	Fulu Mugovhani	Ayanda	Won
2016	Zined Odieb	Behind Closed Doors	Nominated
2016	Adesua Etomi	Falling	Nominated
2016	Maimouna N'Diaye	Eye of the Storm	Nominated
2016	Nse Ikpe Etim, Ireti Doyle, Omoni Oboli, Dakore Egbuson-Akande	Fifty	Nominated
2016	Nomzamo Mbatha	Tell Me Sweet Something	Nominated
2017	Véro Tshanda Beya Mputu	Felicite	Won
2017	Lydia Forson	Keteke	Nominated
2017	Lupita Nyong'o	Queen of Katwe	Nominated
2017	Bimbo Akintola	93 Days	Nominated
2017	Josette Bushell-Mingo	While We Live	Nominated
2017	Rita Dominic	76	Nominated
2017	Khabonina Qubeka	Dora's Peace	Nominated
2017	Zimkhitha Nyoka	Vaya	Nominated
2018	Dakore Egbuson-Akande	Isoken	Won
2018	Kate Henshaw	Roti	Nominated
2018	Reine Swart	Siembamba	Nominated
2018	Okawa Shaznay	In My Country	Nominated
2018	Nana Ama McBrown; Lydia Forson; Sika Osei	Sidechic Gang	Nominated
2018	Mariam Phiri	The Road To Sunrise	Nominated
2018	Tunde Aladese	Lost Café	Nominated
2018	Joselyn Dumas	Potato Potahto	Nominated
2019	Sola Sobowale	King of Boys	Won
2019	Sheila Munyiva	Rafiki	Nominated
2019	Rita Dominic	Light in the Dark	Nominated
2019	Jill Levenberg	Ellen: The Ellen Pakkies Story	Nominated
2019	Beatrice Taisamo	Fatuma	Nominated
2019	Seyi Shay	Lara and the Beat	Nominated
2019	Jemima Osunde	The Delivery Boy	Nominated
2019	Samantha Mugatsia	Rafiki	Nominated
2020	Mary Twala Mhlongo	This is Not A Burial, It’s a Resurrection	Won
2020	Joselyn Dumas	Cold Feet	Nominated
2020	Meg Otanwa	For Maria: Ebun Pataki	Nominated
2020	Zenobia Kloppers	Fiela’s Child	Nominated
2020	Elvina Ibru	The Bling Lagosians	Nominated
2020	Girley Jazama	The White Line	Nominated
2020	Kelly Khumalo	Zulu Wedding	Nominated
2021	Joan Agaba	Stain	Won
2021	Lucie Memba Bois	Buried	Nominated
2021	Funke Akindele	Omo Ghetto: The Saga	Nominated
2021	Sarah Alina Grosz	Black Medusa	Nominated
2021	Phumi Mthembu	African American	Nominated
2021	Rita Dominic	La Femme Anjola	Nominated
2021	Claudine de Groot	Hairareb	Nominated
2022	Ikhlas Gafur Vora	Tug of War	Won
2022	Bless Fortune	Road to my fathers compound	Nominated
2022	Osas Ighodaro	Man of God	Nominated
2022	Ronah Ninsiima	Tembele	Nominated
2022	Vanessa Vanderpuye	A song from the dark	Nominated
2022	Nanfuna Sharon	The Wave	Nominated
2022	Eniola Akinbo	Swallow	Nominated
2023	Nse Ikpe-Etim	4-4-44	Won
2023	Lucie Debay	Omen	Nominated
2023	Elhe Mbali Mlotshwa	4 Walls	Nominated
2023	Nafissaatou Sisse	Sira	Nominated
2023	Adesua Etomi	Gangs of Lagos	Nominated
2024	Jackie Appiah	Red Carpet	Won
2024	Girley Jazama	Under The Hanging Tree	Nominated
2024	Oyin Oladejo	Orah	Nominated
2024	Unati Faku	The Queentown Kings	Nominated
2024	Uzoamaka Aniunoh	The Weekend	Nominated
2024	Laura Pepple	This is Lagos	Nominated
2024	Efe Irele	A Smile, A Wink and A Tear	Nominated
