= As Far as I Can Walk =

- Directed by: Stefan Arsenijević
- Written by: Stefan Arsenijević; Bojan Vuletić; Nicolas Ducray
- Produced by: Miroslav Mogorovich; Alice Ormieres; Gilles Chanial; Borislav Chouchkov; Kęstutis Drazdauskas
- Starring: Ibrahim Koma; Nancy Mensah-Offei
- Cinematography: Jelena Stankovic
- Edited by: Vanja Kovačević
- Music by: Martynas Bialobžeskis
- Production companies: Art & Popcorn; Surprise Alley; Les Films Fauves; Chouchkov Brothers; Artbox
- Release date: 23 August 2021; (Karlovy Vary)
- Running time: 92 minutes
- Countries: Serbia; France; Luxembourg; Bulgaria; Lithuania
- Languages: English; Serbian; French

As Far as I Can Walk (also known as Strahinja Banović or Strahinja) is a 2021 internationally co-produced drama film directed by Stefan Arsenijević and written by Arsenijević, Bojan Vuletić and Nicolas Ducray. It is a modern reimagining of Strahinja Banović, a hero of medieval Serbian epic poetry, that follows a young Ghanaian couple living as refugees in Belgrade. It premiered at the 55th Karlovy Vary International Film Festival, where it won five awards.

== Plot ==
Strahinja and his wife Ababuo left Ghana and reached Germany at the beginning of the refugee crisis, but then they were returned to Belgrade. Serbia may not be Germany, but Strahinya is doing his best to start a new life. He gave himself this Serbian name to better fit into his new surroundings.

They live in a refugee camp in Krnjača, and Strahinja works hard to get asylum, tries his hand at playing football for a local club and works as a volunteer for the Red Cross. One day, a new wave of refugees from Syria arrives in Krnjača, among them the charismatic Ali.

== Cast ==
- Ibrahim Koma as Strahinja, an aspiring footballer
- Nancy Mensah-Offei as Ababuo, an aspiring actress
- Maxim Khalil as Ali
- Rami Farah as Dervish

== Production ==
The film was produced by Miroslav Mogorovich of Serbia's Art & Popcorn, Alice Ormieres of France's Surprise Valley, Gilles Chanial of Luxembourg's Les Films Fauves, Borislav Chouchkov of Bulgaria's Chouchkov Brothers, and Kęstutis Drazdauskas of Lithuania's Artbox. The project received support from Eurimages, Film Center Serbia, the Serbian Film Incentive, Film Fund Luxembourg, the Bulgarian National Film Center, the Lithuanian Film Centre, the CNC's Aide aux cinémas du monde, and the European Union's Creative Europe MEDIA.

Principal photography took place on location in Belgrade in 2020.

== Awards and nominations ==
| Year | Award | Category | Recipient(s) | Result | Ref |
|---|---|---|---|---|---|
| 2021 | Karlovy Vary International Film Festival | Crystal Globe Grand Prix | As Far as I Can Walk | Won | |
| 2021 | Karlovy Vary International Film Festival | Special Jury Mention | Jelena Stankovic (Note: Shared with The Staffroom and Vinette Robinson.) | Won | |
| 2021 | Karlovy Vary International Film Festival | Jury Award | As Far as I Can Walk | Won | |
| 2021 | Karlovy Vary International Film Festival | Europa Cinemas Label Award | As Far as I Can Walk | Won | |
| 2021 | Karlovy Vary International Film Festival | Best Actor | Ibrahim Koma | Won | |
| 2021 | Cairo International Film Festival | European Film | As Far as I Can Walk | Nominated | |
| 2021 | KineNova Film Festival | Best Director | Stefan Arsenijević | Won | |
