= 55th Karlovy Vary International Film Festival =

- Opening film: Zátopek by David Ondříček
- Closing film: The Nest by Sean Durkin
- Location: Karlovy Vary, Czech Republic
- Founded: 1946
- Awards: Crystal Globe: As Far as I Can Walk by Stefan Arsenijević
- No. of films: 144
- Festival date: August 20–28, 2021
- Website: www.kviff.com/en/homepage

KVIFF chronology
- 56th 54th

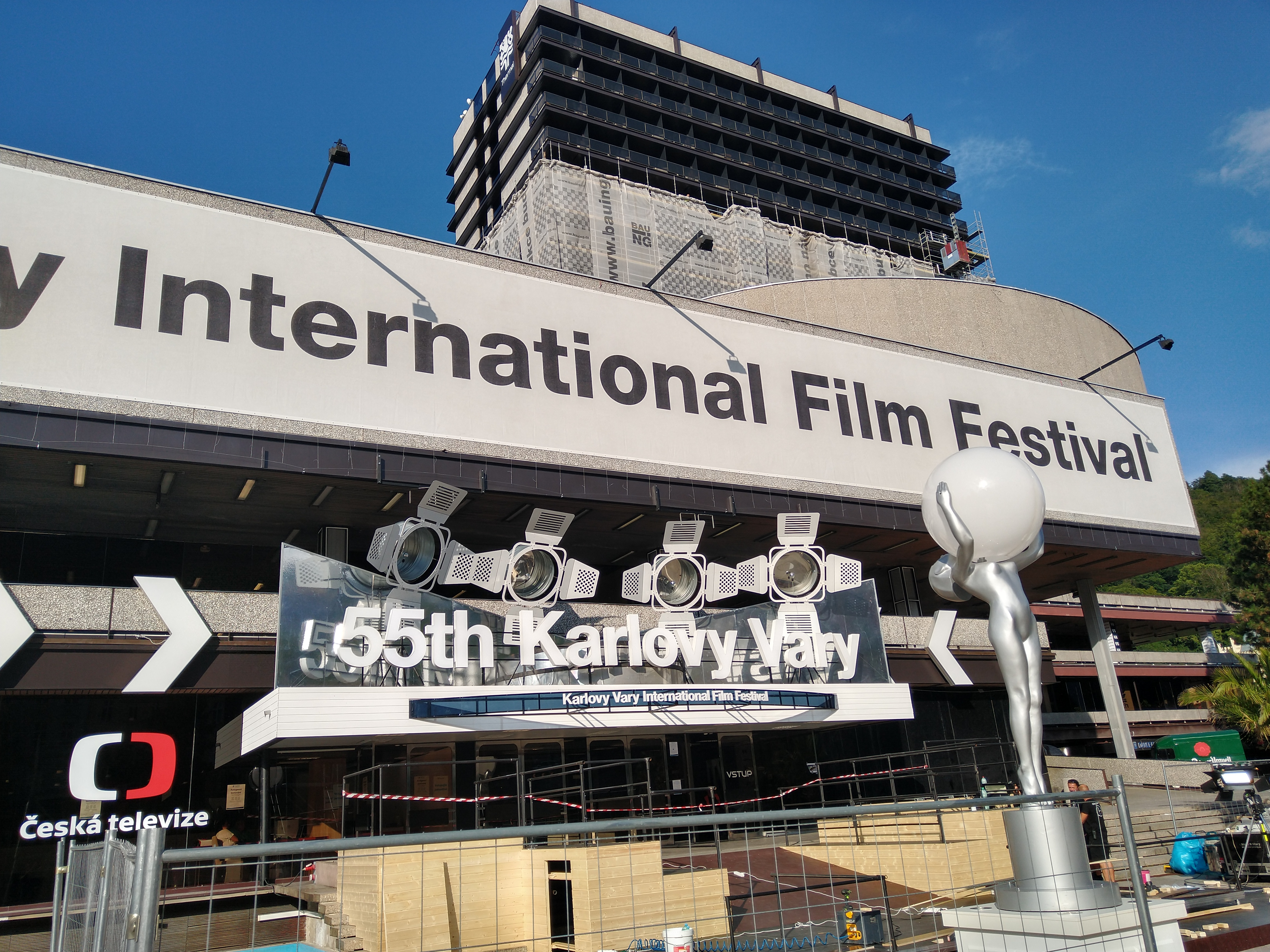
Advertisement for the festival at Hotel Thermal

The 55th Karlovy Vary International Film Festival took place from August 20 to August 28, 2021, in Karlovy Vary, Czech Republic.

A total of 144 films were presented at the festival, including 29 world premieres, twelve international and two European premieres. Serbian-French-Luxembourgish-Bulgarian-Lithuanian co-produced film As Far as I Can Walk won the Crystal Globe. The festival paid tributes to Jan Svěrák and Martin Scorsese's The Film Foundation.

== Juries ==
The following were appointed as the juries at the 55th edition:

Crystal Globe Jury

- Eva Mulvad (Denmark)
- Marta Nieradkiewicz (Poland)
- Christos Nikou (Greece)
- Christoph Terhechte (Germany)

FIPRESCI Jury

- Birgit Beumers (United Kingdom)
- Eirik Bull (Norway)
- Adéla Mrázová (Czech Republic)

East of the West

- Alise Ģelze (Latvia)
- Atanas Georgiev (North Macedonia)
- Michal Hogenauer (Czech Republic)
- Tonia Mishiali (Cyprus)
- Ariel Schweitzer (France)

The Ecumenical Jury

- Pierre-Auguste Henry (France)
- Angelika Obert (Germany)
- Joel Ruml (Czech Republic)

FEDEORA Jury

- Natascha Drubek-Meyer (Germany)
- Mihai Fulger (Romania)
- Nino Kovačić (Croatia)

Europa Cinemas Label Jury

- Linda Arbanová (Czech Republic)
- Erika Borsos (Hungary)
- Gregor Janežič (Slovenia)

== Official selection ==
=== Crystal Globe ===
English title	Original title	Director(s)	Production countrie(s)
As Far as I Can Walk †	Strahinja Banović	Stefan Arsenijević	Serbia, France, Luxembourg, Bulgaria, Lithuania
At Full Throttle	Láska pod kapotou Miro Remo	Czech Republic, Slovakia	
Bird Atlas	Atlas ptáků	Olmo Omerzu	Czech Republic, Slovenia, Slovakia
Boiling Point		Philip Barantini	United Kingdom
Every Single Minute ‡	Každá minuta života	Erika Hníková	Czech Republic, Slovakia
The Exam	Ezmûn	Shawkat Amin Korki	Germany, Iraq, Qatar
The Land of the Sons	La terra dei figli	Claudio Cupellini	Italy
Nö		Dietrich Brüggemann	Germany
Le Prince		Lisa Bierwirth	Germany
Saving One Who Was Dead	Zpráva o záchraně mrtvého	Václav Kadrnka	Czech Republic, Slovakia, France
The Staffroom	Zbornica	Sonja Tarokić	Croatia
Wars	Guerres	Nicolas Roy	Canada

Highlighted title and dagger (†) indicates Crystal Globe winner.
Highlighted title and double-dagger (‡) indicates Special Jury Prize winner.

=== East of the West ===
English title	Original title	Director(s)	Production countrie(s)
After the Winter	Poslije zime	Ivan Bakrač	Montenegro, Serbia, Croatia
Dear Ones	Bliscy	Grzegorz Jaroszuk	Poland, Czech Republic
Intensive Life Unit	Jednotka intenzivního života	Adéla Komrzý	Czech Republic
Mirrors in the Dark	Zrcadla ve tmě	Šimon Holý	Czech Republic
Nuuccha †		Vladimir Munkuev	Russia
Otar's Death		Ioseb "Soso" Bliadze	Georgia, Germany, Lithuania
Patchwork		Petros Charalambous	Cyprus, Israel, Slovenia
Roots	Koreni	Tea Lukač	Serbia
Runner	Bėgikė	Andrius Blaževičius	Lithuania, Czech Republic
Sisterhood ‡	Sestri	Dina Duma	North Macedonia, Kosovo, Montenegro
Two Ships	Marťanské lodě	Jan Foukal	Czech Republic, Norway
Wild Roots	Külön falka	Hajni Kis	Hungary, Slovakia

Highlighted title and dagger (†) indicates East of the West winner.
Highlighted title and double-dagger (‡) indicates East of the West Special Jury Prize winner.

=== Special Screenings ===
English title	Original title	Director(s)	Production countrie(s)
Brighton 4th		Levan Koguashvili	Georgia, Russia, Bulgaria, United States, Monaco
Dreams About Stray Cats	Sny o toulavých kočkách	David Sís	Czech Republic, USA, France
My Sunny Maad	Moje slunce Mad	Michaela Pavlátová	Czech Republic, France, Slovakia
The Party and the Guests	O slavnosti a hostech	Jan Němec	Czechoslovakia
RapStory		Šimon Šafránek	Czech Republic
Reconstruction of Occupation	Rekonstrukce okupace	Jan Šikl	Czech Republic, Slovakia
Roaring 20's	Années 20	Elisabeth Vogler	France
Suspicion	Podezření	Michal Blaško	Czech Republic, France
Zátopek		David Ondříček	Czech Republic, Slovakia

=== Horizons ===
English title	Original title	Director(s)	Production countrie(s)
Ahed's Knee	Haderek	Nadav Lapid	France, Israel, Germany
Ali & Ava		Clio Barnard	United Kingdom
All Eyes Off Me	Mishehu Yohav Mishehu	Hadas Ben Aroya	Israel
Amparo		Simón Mesa Soto	Colombia, Sweden, Qatar
Ananda		Stefano Deffenu	Italy
Apples	Mila	Christos Nikou	Greece, Poland, Slovenia
Babi Yar, Context		Sergei Loznitsa	Netherlands, Ukraine
Bad Luck Banging or Loony Porn	Babardeală cu bucluc sau porno balamuc	Radu Jude	Romania, Luxembourg, Czech Republic, Croatia
Ballad of a White Cow	Ghasideyeh gave sefid	Behtash Sanaeeha, Maryam Moghaddam	Iran, France
Benedetta		Paul Verhoeven	France, Netherlands
Best Sellers		Lina Roessler	Canada, United Kingdom
Between Two Worlds	Ouistreham	Emmanuel Carrère	France
A Chiara		Jonas Carpignano	Italy, France
Commitment Hasan	Bağlılık Hasan	Semih Kaplanoğlu	Turkey
Compartment No. 6	Hytti nro 6	Juho Kuosmanen	Finland, Germany, Estonia, Russia
Conference	Konferentsiya	Ivan I. Tverdovskiy	Russia, Estonia, United Kingdom, Italy
Crock of Gold: A Few Rounds with Shane MacGowan		Julien Temple	United Kingdom, Ireland
The Dawn	Zora	Dalibor Matanić	Croatia
Drive My Car	Doraibu mai kâ	Ryûsuke Hamaguchi	Japan
The Employer and the Employee	El empleado y el patrón	Manuel Nieto Zas	Uruguay, Argentina, Brazil, France
Even Mice Belong in Heaven	Myši patří do nebe	Denisa Grimmová, Jan Bubeníček	Czech Republic, France, Poland, Slovakia
Feathers		Omar El-Zohairy	France, Egypt, Netherlands, Greece
First Reformed		Paul Schrader	United States
Flee		Jonas Poher Rasmussen	Denmark, France, Sweden, Norway
The Furnace		Roderick MacKay	Australia
Ghosts	Hayaletler	Azra Deniz Okyay	Turkey, France, Qatar
A Glitch in the Matrix		Rodney Ascher	United States
Hit the Road	Jadde Khaki	Panah Panahi	Iran
Hive	Zgjoi	Blerta Basholli	Kosovo, Switzerland, North Macedonia, Albania
The House Arrest	Delo	Alexey German Jr.	Russia
Introduction	Inteurodeoksyeon	Hong Sang-soo	South Korea
The Intruder	El prófugo	Natalia Meta	Argentina, Mexico
Lamb	Dýrið	Valdimar Jóhannsson	Iceland, Sweden, Poland
Laurent Garnier: Off the Record		Gabin Rivoire	United Kingdom, Belgium
Love Affair(s)	Les choses qu'on dit, les choses qu'on fait	Emmanuel Mouret	France
Luzzu		Alex Camilleri	Malta
Mariner of the Mountains	O Marinheiro das Montanhas	Karim Aïnouz	Brazil, France, Germany
Memoria		Apichatpong Weerasethakul	Colombia, Thailand, France, Germany, Mexico, Qatar
Memory Box		Joana Hadjithomas and Khalil Joreige	France, Lebanon, Canada, Qatar
Minamata		Andrew Levitas	United States
Mr Bachmann and His Class	Herr Bachmann und seine Klasse	Maria Speth	Germany
Nadia, Butterfly		Pascal Plante	France
Nemesis		Thomas Imbach	Switzerland
The Nest		Sean Durkin	United Kingdom, Canada
Oasis	Oaza	Ivan Ikić	Serbia, Slovenia, Netherlands, France, Bosnia and Herzegovina
Olga		Elie Grappe	Switzerland, Ukraine, France
Onoda: 10,000 Nights in the Jungle	Onoda	Arthur Harari	France, Japan, Germany, Belgium, Italy, Cambodia
The Painted Bird	Nabarvené ptáče	Václav Marhoul	Czech Republic, Slovakia, Ukraine
Paris, 13th District	Les Olympiades	Jacques Audiard	France
Petite Maman		Céline Sciamma	France
El Planeta		Amalia Ulman	Spain
Pleasure		Ninja Thyberg	Sweden, Netherlands, France
Prayers for the Stolen	Noche de Fuego	Tatiana Huezo	Mexico, Germany, Brazil, Qatar
Quo Vadis, Aida?		Jasmila Žbanić	Bosnia and Herzegovina, Austria, Romania, Netherlands, Germany, Poland, France, Norway, Turkey
Roadrunner: A Film About Anthony Bourdain		Morgan Neville	United States
The Sea Ahead	Albahr 'amamakum	Ely Dagher	France, Lebanon, Belgium, United States, Qatar
The Sparks Brothers		Edgar Wright	United Kingdom, United States
Stop-Zemlia		Kateryna Gornostai	Ukraine
Sweat		Magnus von Horn	Poland, Sweden
The Tale of King Crab	Re Granchio	Alessio Rigo de Righi, Matteo Zoppis	Italy, Argentina, France
Tina		T. J. Martin, Daniel Lindsay	United States
The Tsugua Diaries	Diários de Otsoga	Maureen Fazendeiro, Miguel Gomes	Portugal, France
Vortex		Gaspar Noé	France, Belgium, Monaco
We	Nous	Alice Diop	France
What Do We See When We Look at the Sky?	Ras vkhedavt, rodesac cas vukurebt?	Alexandre Koberidze	Germany, Georgia
Wheel of Fortune and Fantasy	Gûzen to sôzô	Ryusuke Hamaguchi	Japan
Women Do Cry		Mina Mileva, Vesela Kazakova	Bulgaria, France
The Worst Person in the World	Verdens værste menneske	Joachim Trier	Norway, France, Sweden, Denmark
Zanka Contact		Ismaël El Iraki	Morocco, France, Belgium

=== Imagina ===
English title	Original title	Director(s)	Production countrie(s)
Come Here	Jai jumlong	Anocha Suwichakornpong	Thailand
Days	Rizi	Tsai Ming-liang	Taiwan
Last and First Men		Jóhann Jóhannsson	Iceland
Rock Bottom Riser		Fern Silva	United States
Taste	Vị	Lê Bảo	Vietnam, Singapore, France, Thailand, Germany

=== People Next Door ===
English title	Original title	Director(s)	Production countrie(s)
Brother's Keeper	Okul Tıraşı	Ferit Karahan	Turkey, Romania
Capernaum	Capharnaüm	Nadine Labaki	Lebanon, France, United States
Little Girl	Petite fille	Sébastien Lifshitz	France
Shoplifters	Manbiki kazoku	Hirokazu Kore-eda	Japan
Summer 1993	Estiu 1993	Carla Simón	Spain

=== Midnight Screenings ===
English title	Original title	Director(s)	Production countrie(s)
The Green Knight		David Lowery	United States
Impetigore	Perempuan Tanah Jahanam	Joko Anwar	Indonesia, United States, South Korea
Mother Schmuckers	Fils de plouc	Lenny Guit, Harpo Guit	Belgium
Mulholland Drive		David Lynch	United States, France
Shoky & Morthy: Last Big Thing	Shoky & Morthy: Poslední velká akce	Andy Fehu	Czech Republic
Train to Busan 2: Peninsula	Bando	Yeon Sang-ho	South Korea

== Awards ==
The following awards were presented at the 55th edition:

=== Official selection awards ===
Grand Prix – Crystal Globe

As Far as I Can Walk by Stefan Arsenijević

Special Jury Prize

Every Single Minute by Erika Hníková

Best Director

Dietrich Brüggemann for Nö

Best Actress

Éléonore Loiselle for Wars

Best Actor

Ibrahim Koma for As Far as I Can Walk

Special Jury Mention

The Staffroom by Sonja Tarokić
Vinette Robinson for her performance in Boiling Point
Jelena Stanković for cinematography in As Far as I Can Walk

=== Other statutory awards ===
East of the West Grand Prix

Nuucha by Vladimir Munkuev

East of the West Special Jury Prize

Sisterhood by Dina Duma

East of the West Special Jury Mention

Intensive Life Unit by Adéla Komrzý

Právo Audience Award

Zátopek by David Ondříček

Crystal Globe for Outstanding Artistic Contribution to World Cinema

Michael Caine (Great Britain)

Festival President's Award for Contribution to Czech Cinematography

Jan Svěrák (Czech Republic)

Festival President's Award

Ethan Hawke (United States)

=== Non-statutory awards ===
Award of International Film Critics (FIPRESCI)

The Exam by Shawkat Amin Korki

The Ecumenical Jury Award

As Far as I Can Walk by Stefan Arsenijević

Ecumenical Jury Commendation

The Staffroom by Sonja Tarokić

FEDEORA Award

Otar's Death by Ioseb "Soso" Bliadze

FEDEORA Jury Special Mention

Intensive Life Unit by Adéla Komrzý

Europa Cinemas Label Award

As Far as I Can Walk by Stefan Arsenijević
