= Yasmin Thayna =

Brazilian filmmaker

Yasmin Thayna is a Brazilian filmmaker who wrote and directed the short film, ′Kbela′ in 2015. ′Kbela′ won the 2017 award for Best Diaspora Short Film in the Africa Movie Academy Awards.

She is also a founder of the online film community Afroflix, which seeks to give people of color an opportunity to share and distribute their work. Thayna has worked on other short films, taught classes, and frequently gives talks about what it means to be black.

== Personal life ==
Yasmin Thayna was born in 1993 to a black mother and white father in an area outside of Rio de Janeiro called Baixada Fluminense.
