= Today (2012 film) =

2012 film

- Film poster
- Directed by: Alain Gomis
- Written by: Alain Gomis
- Produced by: Eric Idriss Kanango; Oumar Sall; Gilles Sandoz
- Cinematography: Crystel Fournier
- Edited by: Fabrice Rouaud
- Release date: 10 February 2012 (Berlin)
- Running time: 88 minutes
- Countries: France; Senegal
- Language: French

Today (French: Aujourd'hui) is a 2012 French-Senegalese film directed by Alain Gomis. The film competed in competition at the 62nd Berlin International Film Festival in February 2012.

== Plot ==
Satché is about to die. He decides to make his last day on this world the day of his life.

== Cast ==
- Saul Williams as Satché
- Djolof Mbengue as Sele
- Anisia Uzeyman as Rama
- Aïssa Maïga as Nella
- Mariko Arame as Satché's mother
- Alexandre Gomis as Lexou
- Frank M. Ahearn as himself
