= Hakeem Effects =

Nigerian special effects artist

- Born: March 5, 1978; Ibadan, Nigeria
- Citizenship: Nigerian
- Occupation: make-up artist
- Spouse: Oluwaseun Onilogbo (m. 2008)

Hakeem Effects (born Hakeem Onilogbo Ajibola), is a Nollywood make-up artist; with specialties include special effects, eyebrows and eyelashes. He is the founder and Chief Executive Officer of "Tricks International"; a special effects and prosthetics company serving a range of productions in the Nollywood film industry. He is known for working on several major films such as King of Boys and Omo Ghetto: The Saga, as well as several music videos.

In 2017, he won the "Best Make-up" Africa Magic Viewers Choice Award for Oloibiri and Africa’s Best Makeup Artist at the 2016 and 2017 Africa Movie Academy Awards in both 2016 and 2017.

== Filmography ==
=== Film and television ===
Year	Work	Role	Notes
2012	Okafor's Law	special makeup effects	
2017	House on the Hill	special makeup effects	
2018	The Delivery Boy	special effects coordinator	
2018	King of Boys	special effects supervisor	
2019	Blameless	make-up, special effects	
2020	The Milkmaid	make-up	
2020	Omo Ghetto: The Saga	make-up, special effects	
2021	Lugard	special effects	
2021	Plus Hubby	Special effects	
2021	King of Boys: The Return of the King	special effects coordinator	
2021	Online	Special effects	
2021	Manifestation	Special effects	
2024	Lisabi: The Uprising	Special effects	

== Awards and nominations ==
Year	Award ceremony	Prize	Work	Result	Ref
2017	2017 Africa Magic Viewers Choice Awards	Best Make-up Artist	Oloibiri	Won	
2018	2018 Africa Magic Viewers Choice Awards	Best Make-up Artist	Tatu	Won	
2018	2018 Africa Magic Viewers Choice Awards	Best Make-up Artist	Disguise	Nominated	
2023	2023 Africa Magic Viewers' Choice Awards	Best Make-up Artist	Anikulapo	Nominated	
2023	2023 Africa Magic Viewers' Choice Awards	Best Make-up Artist	Shanty Town	Won	
2023	2023 Africa Magic Viewers' Choice Awards	Best Make-up Artist	Battle on Buka Street	Nominated	
