= Matatiele (disambiguation) =

Matatiele is a town located in the northern part of the Eastern Cape Province of South Africa.

Matatiele may also refer to:

- Matatiele Local Municipality, municipality located in the Alfred Nzo District of Eastern Cape
- Matatiele (TV series), television drama series
