= Véro Tshanda Beya Mputu =

Congolese actress

Véro Tshanda Beya
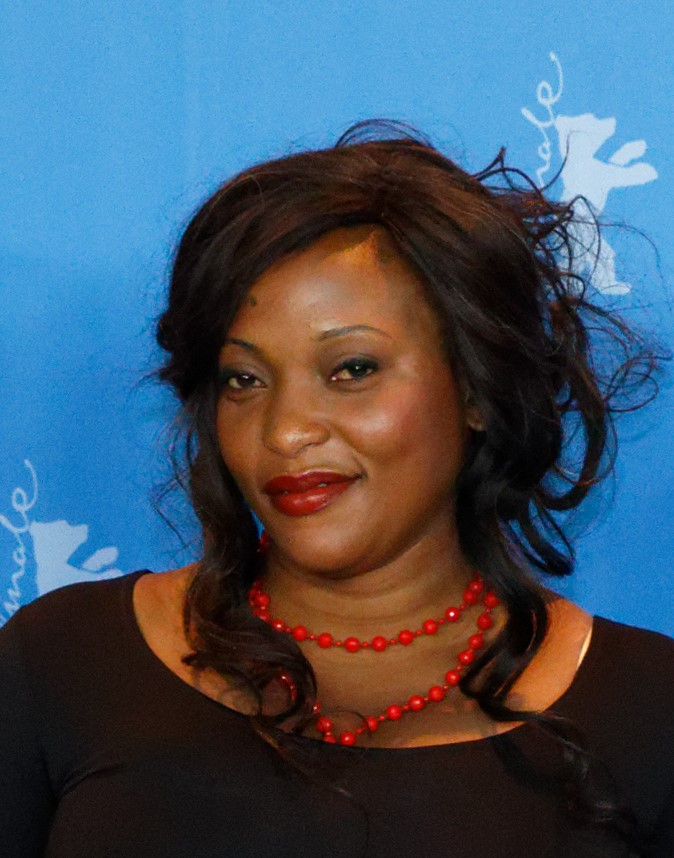
- Born: Véronique Tshanda Beya Mbupu
- Occupation: Actress
- Known for: Felicite
- Awards: Africa Movie Academy Award for Best Actress

Véronique Tshanda Beya Mputu is a Congolese actress. She won the Africa Movie Academy Award for Best Actress in a Leading Role by playing the title character in Felicite.

== Early life ==
Mputu was born and raised in Kinshasa, the capital of the Democratic Republic of Congo.

== Career ==
In 2017, she starred in Felicite, which screened at 67th Berlin International Film Festival. Describing her role, she explained that she was excited about the idea of playing a role the depicts women as being self-reliant and not depending on men to get things done. She won best actress category at the 13th Africa Movie Academy Awards in Lagos, Nigeria. The film was also submitted as the Senegalese entry to the 90th Academy Awards, becoming the first film from the country to be submitted in the history of the award ceremony. The Times noted her performance in the film as a main high-point of the film, describing it as "heroic and award-winning".

She is reported to have four auditions in order to convince director, Alain Gomis, who was not keen on giving her the role.
