= Dao (2026 film) =

2026 drama film by Alain Gomis

DAO
- Directed by: Alain Gomis
- Written by: Alain Gomis
- Produced by: Sylvie Pialat; Benoît Quainon; Toufik Ayadi; Christophe Barral
- Starring: Katy Correa; D'Johé Kouadio; Samir Guesmi; Mike Etienne
- Cinematography: Amath Niane; Céline Bozon; Mabeye Deme
- Edited by: Alain Gomis; Fabrice Rouaud; Assetou Koné; Dimitri Ouedraogo; Elizabeth Ndiaye; Moustapha Mbalo Dieng
- Music by: Gaspard Gomis; Space Dukes; Keïta Janota; Abdullah Ibrahim
- Production companies: Les Films du Worso; Srab Films; Yennenga Productions; Nafi Production; Telecine Bissau Producoes
- Distributed by: Jour2Fête (France)
- Release dates: 14 February 2026 (Berlinale); 29 April 2026 (France)
- Running time: 185 minutes
- Countries: France; Senegal; Guinea-Bissau
- Languages: French; Wolof; Manjak; Guinea-Bissau Creole

Dao (stylised in all caps) is a 2026 docudrama film written and directed by Alain Gomis. A co-production of France, Senegal, and Guinea-Bissau, it stars a mix of professional and non-professional actors, including Samir Guesmi, Katy Correa, D'Johé Kouadio, Mike Etienne, Nicolas Gomis, and Fara Baco Gomis, and explores ritual, memory, and culture between the African immigrants in France and their native countries.

The film had its world premiere at the 76th Berlin International Film Festival on 14 February 2026, where it was nominated for the Golden Bear. It was released in French cinemas by Jour2Fête on 29 April.

== Premise ==
The film is structured between two ceremonies—a wedding in France and a commemorative ritual for the bride's grandfather, who had died two years earlier, in Guinea-Bissau. It explores ritual, memory, and culture between the African immigrants in France and their native country. A central thread is held together by mother Gloria and her daughter Nour, as Gloria teaches Nour about their Guinea-Bissaun heritage.

== Cast ==
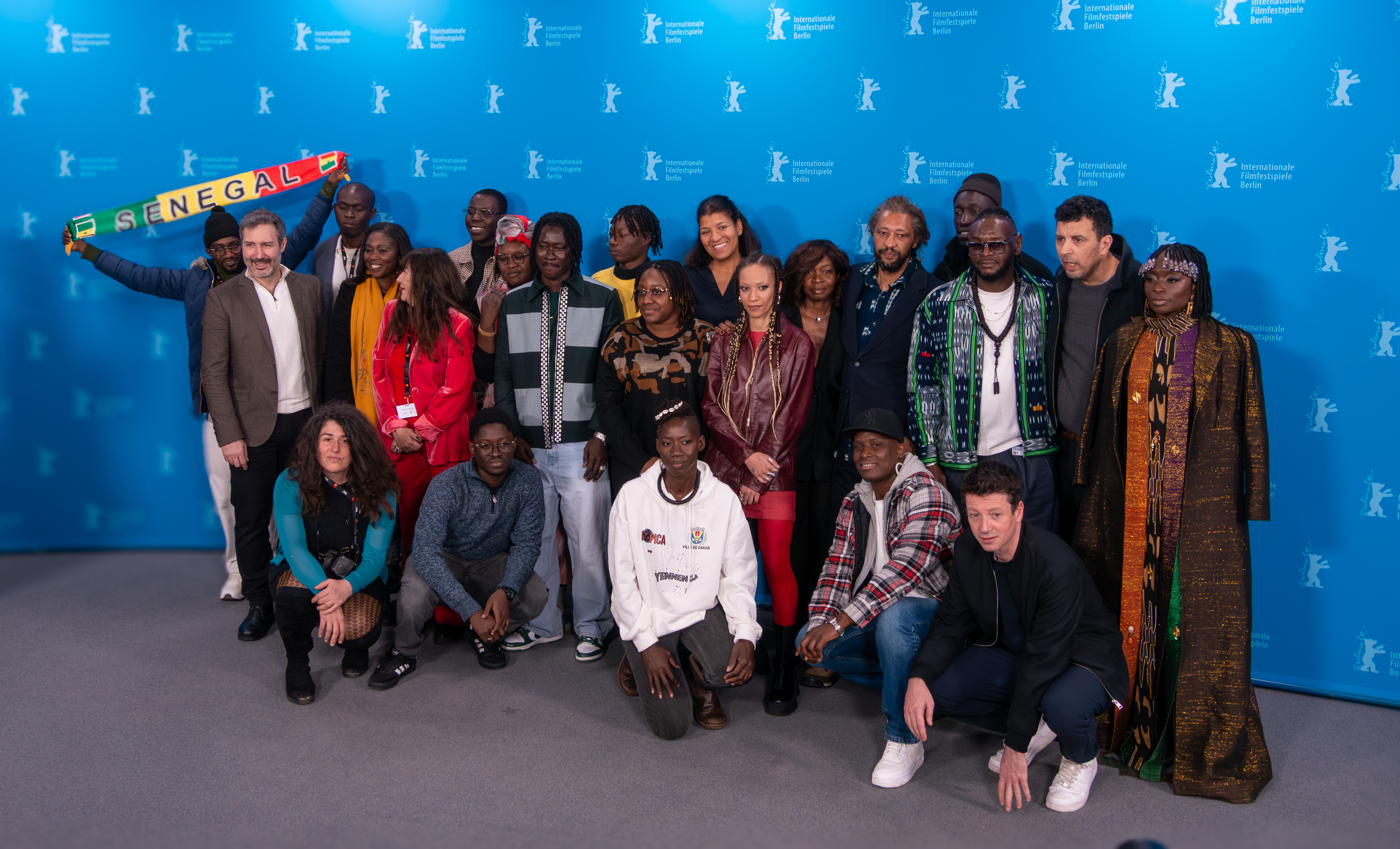
Cast and crew during the 76th Berlin International Film Festival, February 2026

- Katy Correa as Gloria, mother of Nour
- D'Johé Kouadio as Nour, the bride
- Mike Etienne as James, the bridegroom
- Samir Guesmi as Slimane, an ex-partner of Gloria
- Nicolas Gomis as Pierre
- Fara Baco Gomis as Jean
- Poundo Gomis as Diminga

== Production ==
=== Development ===
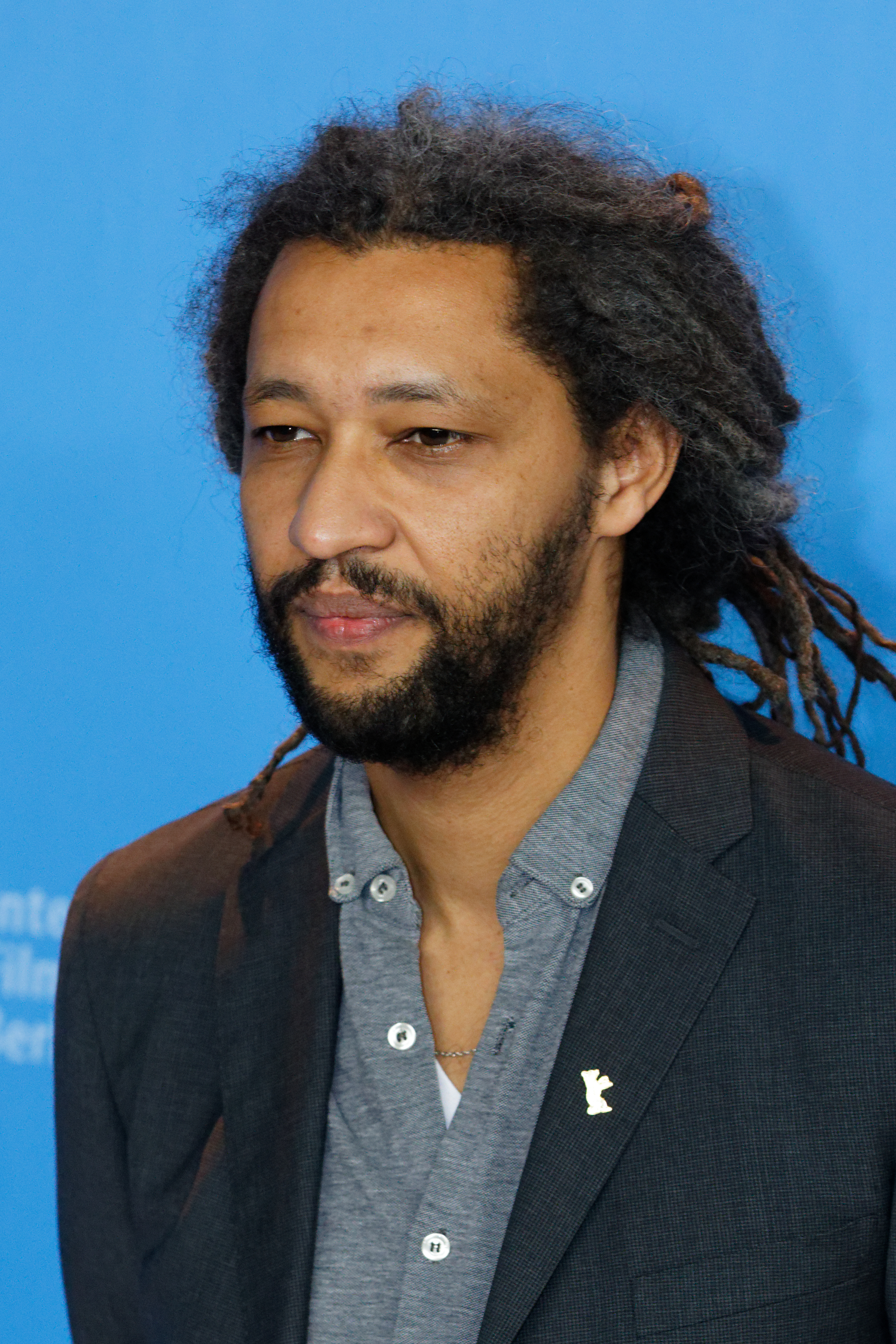
Alain Gomis in 2017

A France–Senegal–Guinea-Bissau co-production, Dao was written and directed by Alain Gomis and developed from personal experiences, including the director's attendance at his father's funeral ceremony in Guinea-Bissau. Gomis has described the project as his most personal work, emphasising collective energy and participation during production.

It was co-produced with Gomis along with Yoro Mbaye, Sylvie Pialat, Christophe Barral, Benoît Quainon, and Toufik Ayadi, and Amath Niane, Céline Bozon (who was cinematographer on Gomis' Silver Bear-winning 2017 film Félicité), and Mabeye Deme were responsible for cinematography. Gomis, Elizabeth Ndiaye, Moustapha Mbalo Dieng, Assetou Koné, Dimitri Ouedraogo,and Fabrice Rouaud edited the film.

Dao is produced by Sylvie Pialat and Benoît Quainon for Les Films du Worso, and by Christophe Barral and Toufik Ayadi for SRAB Films, with co-production by Senegalese companies Yennenga Productions and Nafi Films, and Telecine Bissau Produções in Guinea-Bissau.

=== Filming ===
Principal photography for Dao began on 2 May 2024 in Guinea-Bissau and concluded in June in the Paris region. Filming took place from 2 to 12 May in Guinea-Bissau and from 15 to 23 June in the Yvelines department in France. The project received support from multiple institutions, including the Centre national du cinéma et de l'image animée through its advance-on-receipts program, the Images de la Francophonie fund, Arte/Cofinova, and several Sofica funds. The film was pre-purchased by Canal+, Ciné+, Canal+ International, and TV5 Monde.

=== Soundtrack ===
The film features traditional ceremonial music as well as new jazz music by Gaspard Gomis & Space Dukes and saxophonist Keïta Janota. Also used on the soundtrack is existing music by South African jazz pianist Abdullah Ibrahim. The film is spoken in French, Wolof, Manjak, and Guinea-Bissau Creole.

== Themes ==
As the story unfolds, underlying themes become evident, including the stories of second generation of African immigrants in France; the place of women; and how complex ancestral traditions and values are passed on to the next generation.

Film Fest Report reviewer Martha Bird wrote: "Dao experiments heavily with narrative style, sense of place, and the very structure of filmic realism – more of a collective, rhythmic experience than any traditional, narrative drama". It intersperses fact with fiction in a way that it is sometimes difficult to know whether a scene is real, improvised, or scripted. As such, it "resists any attempt at categorisation... As stated from the very title card, (Note: This reads "a perpetual circling movement framing reality".) Dao instead is about circular motion — life folding into death, France into Guinea-Bissau, performance into truth". Another reviewer commented: "The fact that the film has six listed editors, Gomis included, suggests an exercise in free-ranging assemblage rather than a rigorous pre-planned structure".

== Release ==
Dao had its world premiere at the main competition of the 76th Berlin International Film Festival on 14 February 2026, where it was nominated for the Golden Bear. French distribution is handled by Jour2Fête, which released the film theatrically in France on 29 April 2026. International sales are managed by The Party Film Sales.

It premiered in Italy on 28 March 2026, at the Fondazione Prada, and was again screened in on 27 May 2026 at Haus der Kulturen der Welt in Berlin, followed by a talk with the director, before being released in cinemas in many cities in Germany. It was also selected for screening at a number of international film festivals, including Visions du Réel at Nyon, Switzerland, in the Cinéma du réel section (April 2026); Sydney Film Festival in Sydney, Australia (June 2026); 60th Karlovy Vary International Film Festival in Karlovy Vary, Czech Republic (July 2026); and the Melbourne International Film Festival in Melbourne, Australia (August 2026).

It will have its North American premiere in the Main Slate of the 2026 New York Film Festival on 4 October 2026.

== Reception ==
On review aggregator website Rotten Tomatoes, as of July 2026 the film holds an approval rating of 83% based on 12 reviews.

After its Berlinale screening, Cineuropa reviewer Fabien Lemercier sums up: "[Gomis] presents a work of remarkable maturity, a personal artistic expression of the highest order..." William Stottor of Loud and Clear Reviews gave the film four stars, praising its "structural and formal brilliance" and "thematic depth", calling it also "a fascinating reflection on acting", concluding "Dao is, despite some bumps along the way, an intoxicating, unforgettable experience, and a family drama that is structured and shaped in the freshest ways".

Screen Daily reviewer Jonathan Romney notes (as have most other reviewers) that the length, at three hours, may deter some viewers. However, he praises the cinematography and the score, and says that those who stay the distance will find the film "a compelling proposition".

The Film Stage called the film "a riveting family saga". Also remarking on its length and approach, comments "But those longueurs are the very reason Dao is the rare film that invites you not to watch these characters so much as spend time with them", and gives the viewer "the feeling of watching life unfolding before your eyes".
