= Stefan Arsenijević =

Serbian film director and scriptwriter

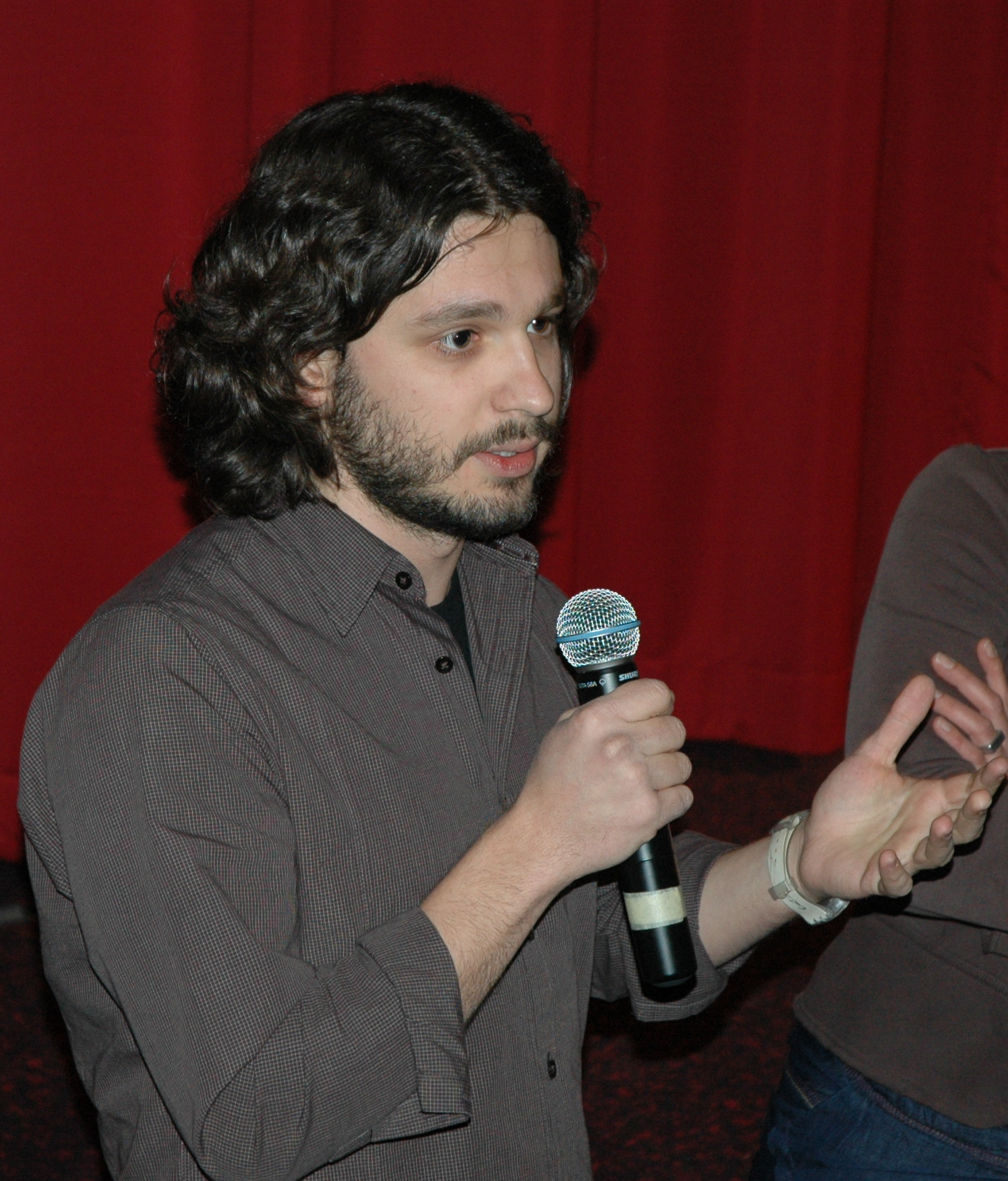
Stefan Arsenijević in 2008

Stefan Arsenijević (Serbian Cyrillic: Стефан Арсенијевић; born 11 March 1977 in Belgrade, SR Serbia, SFR Yugoslavia) is a Serbian film director and scriptwriter.

== Biography ==
He is a graduate of the Ninth Belgrade Gymnasium. He studied philosophy, worked as a journalist and studied film and television directing at the Faculty of Dramatic Arts in Belgrade, where he has been working as a lecturer since 2005. He is also a program manager of Goethe-Institut's FIRST FILMS FIRST training program since 2016.

Arsenijević has received over 30 international accolades for his ten short films, including a Golden Bear at Berlinale, The European Film Academy Award and an Oscar nomination for his short film (A)torzija.

In 2005 his short film “Fabulous Vera”, as part of an omnibus feature Lost & Found, opened Forum section at Berlinale.

His first feature film Ljubav i drugi zločini (Love And Other Crimes) premiered at Berlinale's Panorama Special section in 2008. It won several international awards, including best director at Sofia International Film Festival, Wiesbaden Film Festival and Bursa International Film Festival, Golden Prometheus for best film at Tbilisi International Film Festival as well as an audience award at Crossing Europe Film Festival in Linz.

In 2021 he won the main award Crystal Globe for the best film at the 55th Karlovy Vary International Film Festival for his movie Strahinja Banović (international title As Far As I Can Walk). The film won two more official awards: best actor for Ibrahim Koma and a special mention for cinematographer Jelena Stanković, as well as Ecumenical Jury Prize and Europa Cinemas Label Award.
