= Rewind & Play =

2022 French-German documentary film essay

Rewind & Play (subtitled It's Not Nice) is a 2022 French-German documentary film essay by Alain Gomis.

== Summary ==
Featuring outtakes from a 1969 interview for French television with Thelonious Monk at the end of his European tour given questions by French pianist Henri Renaud (in the film, it also revealed some of the racial discontent between interviewer and interviewee). The subtitle is named after one of the questions Renaud gave to Monk which was deemed "derogatory" by Bernard Lion. It also featured performances by Monk on solo piano on the night of the interview.

== Production ==
Gomis received the footage from the National Audiovisual Institute while researching for a fictional film about Monk.

== See also ==
- Round Midnight - the 1986 Academy Award-winning fictional film featuring legendary be-bop saxophonist Dexter Gordon that's also about jazz music in France named after one of Monk's compositions
