= Ndoto Za Elibidi =

- Directed by: Kamau Wa Ndung'u; Nick Reding
- Written by: Kamau Wa Ndung'u; Nick Reding
- Screenplay by: Kamau Wa Ndung'u; Nick Reding
- Starring: Juma Williams; Sharleen Njeri; Mercy Wanjiru; Krysteen Savane; Ednah Daisy; Peter Nzioki
- Cinematography: Guy Wilson
- Edited by: Carole Gikandi Omondi
- Music by: Jeffrey Harrison
- Production company: S.A.F.E. [Sponsored Arts for Education]
- Release date: 2010
- Running time: 75 min
- Country: Kenya
- Language: Swahili

Ndoto Za Elibidi, is a 2010 Kenyan film. This is a story about two brothers who travel to Nairobi to find work. Against the backdrop of the crowded city, the play tracks their fortunes and those of their children as they struggle with questions of love, loyalty, ignorance, and forgiveness, interspersed with songs and lots of humour. With the help of a Keep A Child Alive grant, S.A.F.E. created Dreams, their first feature film, in 2009.

== Synopsis ==
Ndoto Za Elibidi was devised originally as a stage play for actors from the Nairobi slums. The story pivots around the theme of acceptance and love as its colorful protagonists — parents, four daughters and their lovers — come to terms with HIV and ghetto life. Cutting back and forth from fiction to documentary, from the original stage play to the actual locations, it takes us on two parallel journeys: we watch the story, but we are also watching it through the eyes of the audience. Throughout the film, topics such as PEP treatment for rape victims, ARV use, stigma and discrimination, condom use and circumcision are explored.

== Cast ==
- Juma Williams as George Elibidi
- Sharleen Njeri as Martha
- Mercy Wanjiruu as Petronilla
- Krysteen Savane as Nite
- Edna Daisy Nguka as Shiko
- Ummul Rajab as Mshere
- Godfrey Ojiambo as Alphonse
- Jackie Nyaminde as Agnes
- Caroline Midimo as Joyce
- Eric Wainaina as himself
- Joseph Kimani—twin 1 as 'Babu'
- Paul Njogu - twin 2 as 'Kadez'
- Erick Ndungu as Abedi
- Triza Kabue as Kadogo
- Sam Kihiu as Ken
- Alfred Calypso as Pablo
- Irungu Wairimu as Vinnie
- Caroline Midimo as Joyce
- Kamau Ndungu - VCT Counsellor
- Lucy Waithaka - VCT Receptionist
- Melissah Ommeh - VCT Client
- Mercy Makokha - Doctor
- Peter King Nzioki - Policeman 1
- Small Ogutu - Policeman 2
- Stevejones Mugo - Photographer
- Elly Young - Thief
- Eunice Njoki - Neighbour
- Badiza - Man in Slum
- Mwajuma Bahati - KQ Stewardess

== Awards ==
- Zanzibar International Film Festival 2010

>Golden Dhow for Best East African Talent Ousmane Sembene Award Commendation

- Kenya International Film Festival, Nairobi 2010

Special Jury Prize ‘for speaking powerfully and critically across class, gender and national divides’

- Festival of African Cinema, Verona 2011

Verona Award for Best African Film

- Kalasha Film and Television Awards 2010

Best Feature Film Best Editing Best Supporting Actress

- Africa In The Picture Film Festival, Netherlands, 2012

Audience Selection: Best Feature Film
