= Peter Nzioki =

Kenyan actor

Peter King Nzioki Mwania
- Born: Peter King Nzioki Mwania; May 25, 1978 (age 48); Kenya
- Occupation: Actor
- Years active: 2000–present
- Height: 1.8 m (5 ft 11 in)
- Spouse: Tess King

Peter King Nzioki Mwania (born 25 May 1978), popularly known as Peter King, is a Kenyan actor. He is best known for his roles in the films The Constant Gardener, The Fifth Estate and Sense8.

== Personal life ==
Nzioki was born on 25 May 1978 in Nairobi, Kenya. His father Michael David Mwania, served in the Kenyan Army and his mother worked at the military hospital. At the age of six, he joined church productions at the Lang’ata Barracks. He completed his education from Lang’ata High School in Nairobi.

He is married to fellow actress Tess King.

== Career ==
He made his acting debut in 2000 at the Kenya National Theatre for three years under the guidance of Joab Kanuka. In theater, he played 'Iago' in the Phoenix Players production of the Shakespeare tragedy Othello. In 2005, he made his film debut with a minor role in The Constant Gardener directed by Fernando Meirelles. In the same year, he appeared as 'Barman' in the television movie Transit. In 2016, he appeared in the thriller film The CEO where he played the role of 'Jomo'. The film had its premier 10 July 2016, at the Eko Hotels & Suites, Victoria Island, Lagos and later received critical acclaim.

He made some notable appearances as 'Mkwajo' in award-winning musical Mo Faya directed by Eric Wainaina; scheming spouse in Facebook and corrupt politician 'Mzito' in Ni Sisi. After several villainous roles, he received the role as stepfather in MTV series Shuga 2, then as an inspiring soccer coach in The Inside Story aired in Discovery Channel; and a preacher in The Knife Grinder's Tale.

In 2016, he was selected for the role as Kenyan crime lord 'Silas Kabaka' in the Netflix series Sense8. The role made him a popular television actor in Kenya.

== Filmography ==
Year	Film	Role	Genre	Ref.
2005	The Constant Gardener	Policeman 1	Film	
2005	Transit	Barman	TV movie	
2007	The Knife Grinder's Tale	Preacher	Short film	
2007	Makutano Junction	Albert Mukara	TV series	
2010	Ndoto Za Elibidi	Policeman 1	Film	
2013	The Fifth Estate	Oscar Kamau Kingara	Film	
2016	The CEO	Jomo	Film	
2016	Kati Kati	King	Film	
2016	Sense8	Silas Kabaka	TV series	
2018	Poacher	Kennedy	Short film	

== See also ==
- List of Black Sails characters
