= Cynthia Jele =

South African novelist

- Born: Nozizwe Cynthia Jele; Mpumalanga, South Africa
- Education: North Central College (BA)
- Occupations: Author, consultant, management
- Notable work: Happiness is a Four-Letter Word (2010)
- Awards: Commonwealth Writers' Prize for Best First Book, Africa Region (2011)

Nozizwe Cynthia Jele is a South African novelist. Her novel Happiness is a Four-Letter Word won the 2011 Commonwealth Writers' Prize for Best First Book, Africa Region and the M-Net film prize at the 2011 M-Net Literary Awards. The novel was later adapted into a 2016 movie.

She grew up in Mpumalanga, South Africa. She graduated from North Central College, with a BA degree in International Business in 2003. Jele worked as a public health officer for the Mpumalanga Health Department, and then spent a year in the United States as an au pair.

== Career ==
In 2006, Jele self-published a guide, So You Wanna Be an Au Pair in the USA – What Your Agency Will Never Tell. According to her, she became a writer accidentally, after attending a session held by an American author, who made the audience work in a short writing exercise. The author read a passage from a book and asked the audience to complete the first two paragraphs.

She went on to live in the United Kingdom for a year. Upon her return to South Africa, Jele worked as a management consultant. She has recently established an economic development consultancy, Lombuso Consulting Group. In the 2008 BTA/Anglo-Platinum Short Story Competition, she won first place. In 2011, she won the 2011 Commonwealth Writers’ Prize for the Best First Book in the African region for her novel Happiness is a Four-letter Word. This novel is a story about four female friends living in Johannesburg. It has been variously classified as chick lit and as new world literature. The novel was also shortlisted for the 2011 Booksellers Choice Award, and was later adapted into a movie. Upon its release in South Africa in 2016, the film became a box-office success.

She works as a management consultant, and lives in Johannesburg.

== Works ==
- Happiness is a Four-Letter Word, Kwela Books, 2010, ISBN 978-0-7957-0295-2
- The Ones with Purpose, Kwela Books, 2018, ISBN 978-0-7957-0843-5
