= A Mile in My Shoes (film) =

2016 film

- Film poster
- Directed by: Said Khallaf
- Written by: Said Khallaf
- Starring: Amine Ennaji; Noufissa Benchehida
- Cinematography: Ali Benjelloun
- Edited by: Said Khallaf
- Music by: Mohamed Oussama
- Release date: 17 June 2016 (Durban IFF)
- Running time: 110 minutes
- Country: Morocco
- Language: Arabic

A Mile in My Shoes is a 2016 Moroccan drama film directed by Said Khallaf. It was selected as the Moroccan entry for the Best Foreign Language Film at the 89th Academy Awards but it was not nominated.

== See also ==
- List of submissions to the 89th Academy Awards for Best Foreign Language Film
- List of Moroccan submissions for the Academy Award for Best Foreign Language Film
