= Wùlu =

2016 Malian crime film

- Directed by: Daouda Coulibaly
- Written by: Daouda Coulibaly
- Produced by: Éric Névé; Oumar Sy
- Starring: Ibrahim Koma; Inna Modja; Quim Gutiérrez; Olivier Rabourdin; Ndiaye Ismaël
- Cinematography: Pierre Milon
- Edited by: Julien Leloup
- Music by: Éric Neveux
- Production companies: La Chauve Souris; Astou Films; Orange Studio; Appaloosa Films
- Distributed by: New Story (France) (theatrical); Indie Sales (World-wide)
- Release date: August 2016 (Angouleme)
- Running time: 95 minutes
- Countries: France; Mali; Senegal
- Languages: French; Bambara
- Box office: $37,765

Wùlu, the Malian Scarface is a 2016 Malian crime drama film directed by Marseille-born French-Malian director Daouda Coulibaly and co-produced by Éric Névé and Oumar Sy. The film stars Ibrahim Koma and Inna Modja with Quim Gutiérrez, Olivier Rabourdin, and Ndiaye Ismaël in supporting roles. The film is about Ladji, a 20-year-old van driver in Mali who becomes a West African drug lord during the 2012 Mali War. He started committing crimes so that his older sister could quit working as a prostitute.

The film received critics acclaim and screened worldwide. The film premiered at the 2016 Angouleme Film Festival. The next year, lead actor Ibrahim Koma won the Best Actor Award at FESPACO 2017.

Originally the shooting was planned in Mali, but later relocated to Senegal for security reasons after the Bamako attack occurred in November 2015. Then the film was shot in Thiès, Senegal.

== Cast ==
- Ibrahim Koma as Ladji
- Inna Modja as Aminata
- Quim Gutiérrez as Rafael
- Olivier Rabourdin as Jean-François
- Ndiaye Ismaël as Zol
- Habib Dembélé as Issiaka
- Jean-Marie Traoré as Houphouët
- Ndiaye Mariame as Assitan
