= Kbela =

2015 Brazilian short film

- Directed by: Yasmin Thayna
- Written by: Yasmin Thayna
- Starring: Monique Rocco; Isabél Zuaa
- Release date: 12 September 2015; (Brazil)
- Running time: 21 minutes
- Countries: Brazil; Nigeria
- Language: Portuguese
- Budget: $1,000 est.

Kbela, is a 2015 Brazilian short film directed by Yasmin Thayna. The film is about the racism black women in Brazil face.

The film received positive reviews and won several awards at international film festivals. The film was released in The Netherlands on 24 January 2019 at International Film Festival Rotterdam. On 28 October 2019, it was released at North Carolina Latin American Film Festival, USA. In 2017, the film received the Best African Diaspora Short Film Award from the Africa Movie Academy Awards (AMAA).

== Cast ==
- Monique Rocco
- Isabél Zuaa
