= Matatiele (TV series) =

South African television drama series

- Matatiele Poster
- Genre: Drama
- Directed by: Rolie Nikiwe; Zuko Nodada
- Country of origin: South Africa
- Original languages: Xhosa; Sotho
- No. of seasons: 1
- No. of episodes: 23

Production
- Executive producer: Luxury Msiza
- Producer: Khobi Ledwaba
- Production company: Branded Soul

Original release
- Network: e.tv
- Release: 7 April – 2 September 2015

Matatiele is a South African television drama series produced by Rolie Nikiwe and Zuko Nodada. It is an e.tv original production produced by Branded Soul for e.tv, and stars Zimkhitha Kumbaca, Solomon Sebothoma, Charmaine Mtinta, Motshabi Tyelele and Thobani Mseleni, among others.

== Plot ==
The series tells the story of two families: the Xhosa family of the Sangqu and the Sotho family of the Monaheng, who are in a longstanding feud with each other that dates back far as the Mfecane war. The younger members of both families, Lefa Monaheng and Nontle Sangqu fall in love with each other. This sparks tension with both families.

== Cast ==
- Solomon Sobothoma as Lefa Monaheng, a Sotho sketch artist who falls in love with a Xhosa girl called Nontle Sangqu.
- Zimkhitha Kumbaca as Nontle Sangqu, a Xhosa girl who falls in love with Lefa Monaheng. They keep their forbidden love as secret until Nontle falls pregnant.
- Motshabi Tyelele as Beauty Monaheng, Lefa's mother. She used to be a beauty queen in her prime years and brags about her life any chance she gets. Even when the family's financial situation is dire, she keeps a straight face and prefers hiding their shame. Much to Lefa's annoyance, she takes up a load of debt.
- Thobani Mseleni as Bhonyongo Sangqu, Nontle's brother. He is violent and short-tempered. He carries resentment towards his father for leaving him and his family. He is very protective of his mom and sister and sees himself as the new head of the household having to fill his absent father's shoes.
- Charmaine Mtinta as Norain Sangqu, Nontle's aunt. She is brash, loud and opinionated. She is always the cause of conflict as she stands up for what she deems to be right.
- Mothusi Chebeletsane as Lekunutu Monaheng, Lefa's grandfather.
- Sello Motloung as Motsamai Monaheng, Lefa's father. He comes back home from working in the city, as working with asbestos has taken a toll on his health.
- Amanda Quwe as Nobusika Sangqu, Nontle's mother.
- Mike Mvelase as Mfundisi, the pastor of the community.
- Mnatha Vika as Ta-Rich, Nontle and Bhonyongo's father. He returns home during Nontle and Lefa's wedding and causes tension among the Sangqu family.

== Production ==
Production for the series began 16 February 2015, with the series shot in Matatiele, with an active involvement by the community, giving an internship opportunity to 11 youth (initially six). Production for the series concluded in April 2015.

=== Casting ===
Motshabi Tyelele, Charmaine Mtinta and Mike Mvelase were announced as the starring cast for the series. Thereafter, auditions were held at the Nokhwezi Hall, eiTsokolele, ending 20 February 2015.

== Broadcast ==
The series premiered on e.tv on the 7 April 2015, and ended on the 29 September 2015. The series was rerun on the now defunct eKasi+ on the 17 April 2015 and ended on the 2nd October 2015. It was later rerun again on eExtra on the 1st of July 2018 and ending 23 December 2018.

The series was added to e.tv streaming service eVOD.

== Awards and nominations ==
Year	Award	Category	Nominee(s)	Result	Ref.
2016	South African Film and Television Awards	Best Achievement in Make-Up and Hairstyling in a TV Drama	Rosina Olifant	Won	
2016	South African Film and Television Awards	Best Achievement in Directing a TV Drama	Rolie Nikiwe, Zuko Nodada	Won	
2016	South African Film and Television Awards	Best Supporting Actress in a TV Drama	Charmaine Mthinta	Won	
2016	South African Film and Television Awards	Best Supporting Actress in a TV Drama	Motshabi Tyelele	Nominated	
2016	South African Film and Television Awards	Best TV Drama	Matatiele	Nominated	
