= Said Khallaf =

Moroccan screenwriter

- Citizenship: Morocco
- Occupation(s): Film director, Screenwriter

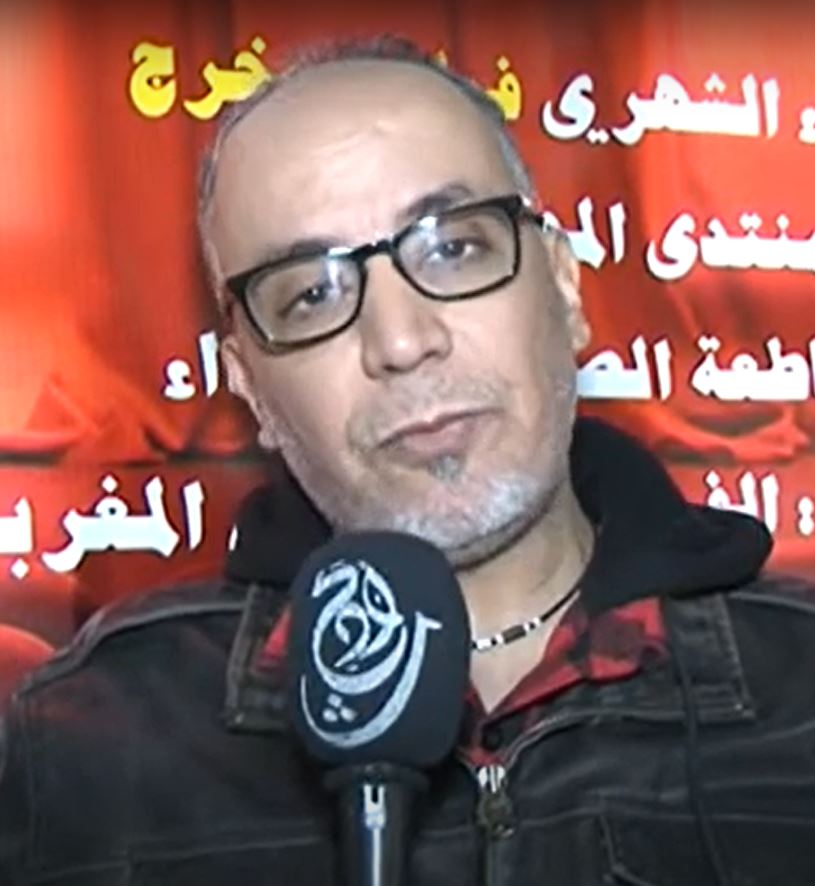

Said Khallaf is a Moroccan screenwriter and director. He is best known for his 2016 film A Mile in My Shoes.

== Biography ==
Khallaf was born in Casablanca. He had emigrated to Canada with the intention of studying software engineering, but ended up pursuing film studies. He joined the Vancouver Film School in 2004 and attended multiple courses and workshops and eventually obtained a bachelor's degree in film studies at the University of Vancouver in 2010.

Khallaf began his career in Vancouver, performing on stage and co-writing a number of plays. For a year and a half, he produced and directed programs for the Canadian channel M2 (now MTV2).

His feature film A Mile in My Shoes won the Grand Prize at the 17th Tangier Film Festival, the Golden Palm for Best Feature Film at the Arab and European Film Festival in Luxor, and FESPACO's Stallion of Yennenga. It was screened at the 2016 Downtown Los Angeles FilmFestival. It was also selected as the Moroccan entry for the Best Foreign Language Film at the 89th Academy Awards.

== Filmography ==
=== Feature films ===
- 2016: A Mile in My Shoes (Massafat Mile Bihidayi)
- 2017: Comedy (La Comédie)
- 2019: Les égarés
- 2019: Ouyoun Ghaima (TV Series)
- 2023: Ould L Fchouche (TV Series)
