= Happiness Is a Four-letter Word =

Happiness Is A Four-Letter Word
- Directed by: Thabang Moleya
- Written by: Busisiwe Ntintili
- Produced by: Junaid Ahmed; Bongiwe Selane; Helena Spring
- Starring: Khanyi Mbau; Mmabatho Montsho; Renate Stuurman; Hlomla Dandala; Chris Attoh; Tongayi Chirisa; Richard Lukunku; Emmanuel Castis
- Cinematography: Lance Gewer
- Edited by: Nicholas Costaras; Melanie Jankes; Golden
- Music by: Mpumi Phillips
- Release date: 19 February 2016 (South Africa)
- Running time: 92 minutes
- Country: South Africa
- Language: English
- Box office: $728,208

Happiness is a Four-letter Word is a 2016 South African romantic drama film directed by Thabang Moleya and written by Busisiwe Ntintili. Based on the novel of the same name by Nozizwe Cynthia Jele, the film tells the story of three friends trying to find their happiness while maintaining images of success and acceptability.

The film revolves around three women. Glamorous trophy housewife Zaza, played by Khanyi Mbau, seems to be living the new South African dream of money, success, and loving partners. Lawyer and compulsive perfectionist Nandi, played by Mmabatho Montsho, whose life from the outside is perfect, has a great career and forthcoming nuptials, but in reality, she is suffocating. Trendy art gallery owner and serial dater Princess is played by Renate Stuurman. The three friends juggle life's surprising changes as they come to learn that "happiness doesn't come with a manual". The three will have to find out what truly makes each of them happy and then fight to get it in their unique way.

A sequel is currently under development, set to premiere on Netflix later this year.

== Plot ==
Perfectionist Nandi seems to have the new South African dream life within her grasp: being a partner in a major firm, a marriage and the perfect house - but it all goes up in flames a few months before the wedding. With her friends Zaza and Princess, Nandi will have to find out what truly makes her happy and then fight to get it.

== Cast ==
- Khanyi Mbau as Zaza, glamorous trophy wife and mother of two. She loves everything that shines, call her the Queen of Bling if you may. She delivers shallow remarks such as "Well, shopping relaxes me". Bored with her lonely life, Zaza has an illicit love affair with a married man (Daniel Hadebe), while her inattentive husband (Simo Magwaza) is away on business, because according to Zaza's wisdom having an affair with another married person doesn't really count as cheating.
- Renate Stuurman as Princess, art gallery owner and serial dater who falls head-over-heels in love with smooth-talking afrocentric artist (Richard Lukunku), the kind of guy your mama warned you about, to a dramatic outcome.
- Mmabatho Montsho as Nandi, a lawyer and compulsive perfectionist. From the outside she has the perfect life: a doting fiancé (Tongayi Chirisa), great career and forthcoming nuptials. But in reality she is suffocating, because all she ever does is give, while everyone around her takes. Her fiancé comes with baby mama drama, while her overbearing father refuses to see that his little girl is no longer little. She is so concerned with keeping others happy that she can't even answer a simple question like "What do you want?" As if she didn't have enough on her plate, a blast from the past (Chris Attoh) re-enters her life, tempting her to come dance with the devil.
- Chris Attoh as Chris
- Emmanuel Castis as Le Roux
- Tongayi Chirisa as Thomas
- Richard Lukunku as Leo
- Stevel Marc as Fabian / Model

== Reception ==
=== Box office ===
Happiness is a Four-Letter Word pulled in 45,000 attendees and gross box office receipts of R2 371,782 in its opening three days. It was the best performing film of all new releases, in South Africa, on the weekend of 19 February, and did better than international releases such as 13 Hours: The Secret Soldiers of Benghazi, Hail Caesar!, Fifty Shades of Black and Trumbo. It was ranked at number 3 on the Top 10 after Deadpool and Vir Altyd. Mario Dos Santos, CEO of Ster-Kinekor Entertainment, said: "The opening weekend's results for the film are simply overwhelming not only from local content perspective but also in comparison to Hollywood content."

== Sequel ==
In March 2021, Netflix announced that it had greenlit a sequel to the film, titled Happiness Ever After, with Mbau and Moleya returning and Ayanda Halimana penning the script. It was released on Netflix in November 2021.
