= Ibrahim Koma =

French actor

- Born: 5 November 1987 (age 37); 20th arrondissement, Paris, France
- Occupation: Actor
- Years active: 1999–present

Ibrahim Koma (born 5 November 1987) is a French actor. He began his career as a child actor in the film We Need a Holiday (2002) and the soap opera Sous le soleil (2002–2008). He has since starred in the films Asphalt Playground (2012), Wùlu (2016), and As Far as I Can Walk (2021). He played Passepartout in the series Around the World in 80 Days (2021).

== Early life ==
Koma was born in the 20th arrondissement of Paris in the city's east to Soninke parents from Mali and grew up in the Baconnets quarter of Antony, Hauts-de-Seine, south of Paris. He and his siblings were brought up by their widowed mother. His older brother Diouc Koma is also an actor. Koma trained at the Cours Viriot, Actor's Studio, and Laboratoire de l'Acteur. He spent some time in London where he learned English and took classes at Birkbeck, University of London.

== Filmography ==
=== Film ===
Year	Title	Role	Notes
2002	We Need a Holiday (French: Fais-moi des vacances)	Adama	
2002	La fourmi amoureuse		Short film
2002	Girls Can Get Away with Anything (French: Les filles, personne s'en méfie)		
2002	The Code (French: La Mentale)		
2006	Beur blanc rouge	Moussa	Comedy film
2012	Asphalt Playground (French: La Cité rose)	Djibril	
2013	Gare du Nord	Former G2N	Romantic Drama
2014	Le Crocodile du Botswanga	Leslie Konda	Comedy film
2015	Je suis Daddy	Isidor	Thriller
2016	Wùlu	Ladji	Crime / Drama
2017	Wallay	Jean	Drama
2018	Sink or Swim (French: Le Grand Bain)	Tech	Comedy / Sport / Drama
2018	La leçon de danse		Romantic Drama
2021	OSS 117: From Africa with Love (French: OSS 117: Alerte rouge en Afrique noire)	Promedi	Action / Comedy
2021	As Far as I Can Walk	Strahinja	Alternate title: Strahinja Banovic

=== Television ===
Year	Title	Role	Notes
1999	Immediate Boarding (French: Décollage immédiat)	Idrissa	Miniseries; episode: "L'Enfance volée"
1999	Chère Marianne	Aboubakar	Episode: "Cellule familiale"
1999	Palazzo		Television film
2000	Police District		Episode: "Situation familiale"
2000	Le Crocodile		Episode: "Tableaux de chasse"
2002	Les P'tits Lucas	François	Television film
2002–2008	Sous le soleil	Zacharie "Zach" Mondino	57 episodes
2004	Navarro	Little Louis	2 episodes
2004	K.ça	Hong	10 episodes
2006	Sois le meilleur		Television film
2006, 2009	Night Squad (French: Central Nuit)	Plume / Oscar Malonga	2 episodes
2008	Ben et Thomas	Siki	Episode: "Slalom"
2009	Julie Lescaut	Jimmy Ferran	Episode: "Fragile"
2009	Medical Emergency (French: Équipe médicale d'urgence)	Jamel	Episode: "Ça passe ou ça casse"
2012	Alice Nevers: The Judge is a Woman	Lucas	Episode: "Bio Connection"
2013	Sous le soleil de Saint-Tropez	Zacharie "Zach" Mondino	4 episodes
2014	Dos au mur	Scoubi	Episode: "Sous le vernis"
2018	Mother Is Wrong (French: Maman a tort)	Lucas	6 episodes
2019	Point-Blank (French: États d'Urgence)	Amir	Television film
2021	Around the World in 80 Days	Passepartout	Main role

== Awards and nominations ==
Year	Award	Category	Work	Result	Ref
2014	César Awards	Most Promising Actor	La Cité rose	Nominated	
2017	Panafrican Film and Television Festival of Ouagadougou	Best Actor	Wùlu	Won	
2017	Africa Movie Academy Awards	Best Actor in a Leading Role	Wùlu	Nominated	
2017	Africa International Film Festival	Best Actor	Wùlu	Won	
2017	Trophées Francophones	Best Actor	Wùlu	Won	
2018	Trophées Francophones	Best Supporting Actor	Wallay	Nominated	
2021	Karlovy Vary International Film Festival	Best Actor	As Far As I Can Walk	Won	
