= Frank M. Ahearn =

American writer

Frank M. Ahearn is a privacy expert and The New York Times best-selling author.

He is the author of:

- How to Disappear: Erase Your Digital Footprint, Leave False Trails, And Vanish Without a Trace published by Globe Pequot Press; First Edition, September 1, 2010.
- How to Disappear from Big Brother: Avoid Surveillance, Prevent Unwanted Intrusion and Create Privacy in an Era of Global Spying, published 2014.
- The Digital Hit Man: His Weapons for Combating the Digital World, Paperback – January 15, 2012, Published by Disappear.Info
