= Noufissa Benchehida =

Moroccan French actress

- Born: October 23, 1975 (age 50)
- Education: Cours Florent
- Occupation: Actress
- Years active: 2004-present
- Awards: Panafrican Film and Television Festival of Ouagadougou.And Golden Sotigui

Noufissa Benchehida (born 23 October 1975) is a Moroccan actress.

== Biography ==
Benchehida was born in Morocco in 1975 in Oujda. She developed a passion for cinema in her childhood. She studied at the Cours Florent in Paris. Benchehida earned a diploma in dramatic arts at the Conservatory of Casablanca. She also attended Ecole supérieure d’hôtellerie et de tourisme à Montpellier.

Benchehida made her film debut in 2004, in Syriana directed by Stephane Cagan. She rose to fame playing the police officer Zineb Hejjami in the TV series El kadia in 2006. She stated she enjoyed the role but did not want to become typecast playing police officers, and wanted to appear in action films. Also in 2006, she was in the Syrian TV series Moulouk Attawaif. In 2011, Benchehida has a principal role as a woman who campaigned on behalf of exploited women in Agadir Bombay, directed by Myriam Bakir. In 2015, she starred in the film Aida.

In 2016, Benchehida starred in A la recherche du pouvoir perdu ("In Search of Lost Power"), directed by Mohammed Ahed Bensouda. She portrayed Ilham, a cabaret singer who gets involved with a retired general. Her performance caused her to receive the Golden Sotigui at the 2017 Sotigui Awards. Benchehida was also awarded Best Actress honors at the Panafrican Film and Television Festival of Ouagadougou.

Benchehida speaks French, Arabic, and English.

== Filmography ==
- 2004 : Syriana
- 2006 : El kadia (TV series)
- 2006 : Moulouk Attawaif (TV series)
- 2009 : Elle
- 2010 : Scars (short film)
- 2010 : Une heure en enfer (TV series)
- 2011 : Agadir Bombay
- 2013 : Beb El Fella - Le Cinemonde
- 2013 : Appel Forcé
- 2015 : Aida
- 2016 : Massafat Mile Bihidayi
- 2016 : A la recherche du pouvoir perdu
- 2018 : Wala alik (TV series)
- 2020 : Alopsy (short film)
