= Monica Friday =

Nigerian film actress, influencer, realtor, model and producer

- Born: Monica Friday; April 19, 1988 (age 38); Badagry, Lagos, Nigeria
- Occupations: Actress, influencer, realtor, model and producer
- Years active: 2008–present

Monica Friday (born April 19, 1988) is a Nigerian film actress, influencer, realtor, model and producer.

== Early life and education ==
Monica was born at Badagry and grew up at Ajegunle, a neighbourhood located in Lagos into a Christian home. She started her Education at Mistermis Kiddies Academy. She completed her secondary school education at Newland Senior Secondary School, Lagos before she proceeded to Olabisi Onabanjo University, Ogun State where she studied Mass Communication.Mass communication

== Career ==
She made her first television appearance playing a role as an extra in a Wale Adenuga project titled a New Song, Her first major film role was in 2015 when she appeared in Remi Vaughan-Richards's film Unspoken.

Monica has starred in long-running 2015 M-Net series, "Do Good" and African Tale Film "Dérè" released in 2016. In 2019, She starred in the movie " Zena" as Rexiha.

== Television series ==
- Do Good
- The Village Headmaster
- Dérè
- Flat Mates
- So Wrong, So Good

== Filmography ==
- Bad Generation (2008)
- Being Mrs Elliot (2014)
- The King's Cross (2019)
- October 1 (2014)
- Murder at Prime Suites (2013)
- The First Lady (2015)
- Wives on Strike (2014)
- Abducted (2015)
- Zena (2019)
- Mothers & Daughters In-Law (2019)
- Timeless Passion (2020)
- Unspoken (2015)
- Labour Room (2017)
- Iquo's Journal (2015)
- Cliché (2016)
- Hoodrush (2012)
- Two Brides And A Baby (2011)
- Bonny & Clara (2019)
- Savior(2015)
- My Body My Proud (2020)
- Silent Murder (2021)

=== Production ===
- Sealed Lips (2018)
- Yoruba Demons (2018)
- Best Mistake (2019)
- Mr Romanus (2020)
- Chronicles of Ejiro (2020)
