= Bojan Vuletić =

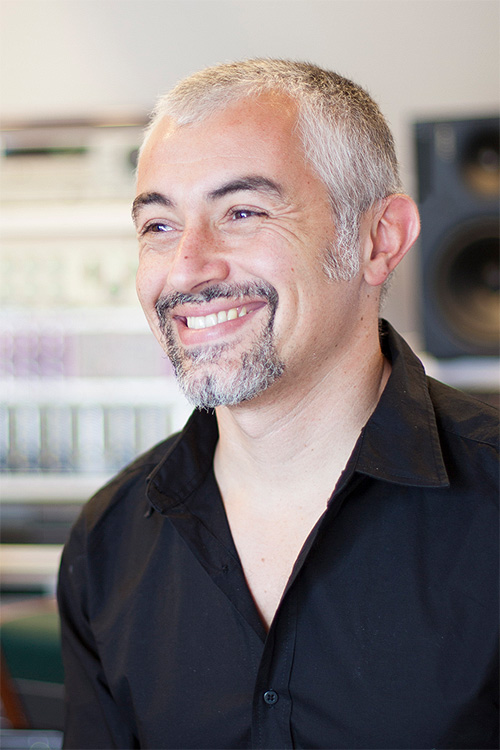
- Bojan Vuletić in 2011

Bojan Vuletić (born June 11, 1971 in Belgrade) is a composer, musician and producer. Vuletic’s music is marked by its unusual overcoming of genres and his interdisciplinary approach to theater, art installations, movies, contemporary dance and poetry. His compositional works reach from chamber music to orchestra and big band, from contemporary to world and pop music for a larger variety of groups and projects.

== Career ==
Vuletić was born in Belgrade, Yugoslavia (presently Serbia), and grew up mostly in Germany. In his childhood and youth he took lessons and played violine and guitar. Before turning to studying at a music conservatory, Vuletic finished studies in astro physics at LMU Munich, Germany, with a diploma thesis about galaxy evolution. He then studied jazz-guitar at the Hogeschool voor de Kunsten Arnhem, Netherlands, and afterwards completed his master studies („tweede phase studie“) at the Messiaen-Akademie, Netherlands, in composition with Paul Keijsers and Martin Fondse.

He founded the musical groups B1 and Biyuya Ensemble and was musical director for a large variety of ensembles including the 3-year-project „Polyphonie“ and „Schlaf, Menschlein, Schlaf“ in collaboration with the Philharmonie Duisburg for the European Capital RUHR.2010. He collaborated with musicians such as Zeena Parkins, Nate Wooley, Matt Moran, Audrey Chen, Soo-Jung Kae, Patrice Bart-Williams and Frank Schulte, as well as ensembles like Die Toten Hosen, WDR Big Band and Trovači.

Vuletić constantly works for visual artists like Aurelia Mihai and his long collaboration with and for Danica Dakic was to be heard in international exhibitions like the documenta 12, Kunsthalle Düsseldorf, Museum für Moderne Kunst Frankfurt and the biennales in Istanbul and Liverpool.

Among the large variety of theatre productions for directors as Volker Hesse, Dedi Baron, Günther Beelitz, Nurkan Erpulat, Bettina Jahnke, and Thorsten Weckherlin his new compositions for the Bertolt Brecht pieces Der kaukasische Kreidekreis and Die heilige Johanna der Schlachthöfe stand out, as they were officially commissioned by Barbara Brecht-Schall and the Brecht-Erben GmbH. As a composer and performer he worked on contemporary dance pieces of choreographers like Yun-Jun Kim and Marcus Grolle in South Korea, Canada, Japan and Germany.

His radio installation for Naomi Schenck „Das Rätsel des Schafs“ won the German Audio Feature-Prize 2007 of the first television in Germany (ARD) and his radio piece „Photo Sensitive, 1“ for the Serbian Radio RTS was nominated for a number of awards.

Vuletić worked as a guest lecturer among others at Ruhr University Bochum (Master Szenische Forschung), Bauhaus University, Weimar (Master Public Art and New Artistic Strategies) and Dong-ah Institute of Media and Arts Seoul.

Bojan Vuletic received the music award 2012 of the City of Düsseldorf and was 2014-16 musical-artistic director of the Junges Schauspielhaus in Düsseldorf, Germany.

In 2012 theatre director Christof Seeger-Zurmühlen and Bojan Vuletić have founded and directed the annual ASPHALT Festival Düsseldorf for theatre, music, art, literature and dance.

== Selected discography (as musician, composer and/or producer) ==
- CD „Raging Low“ – B1, Ignoring Gravity Music (IGM 01-01, 2001)
- CD „Grace.“ – Irene Latzko & Bojan Vuletić, Ignoring Gravity Music (IGM 02-02, 2002)
- CD „Breakdown.yu“ – Biyuya Ensemble, Ignoring Gravity Music (IGM 03-03)
- CD „Birdy“ – Biyuya Ensemble, Ignoring Gravity Music (IGM 04-05, 2004)
- LP 12" „What 2 Do“ – Can 7, Peppermint Jam (PJMS 0074)
- EP VINYL „The One Cultural Groove“ – Raw Artistic Soul, GoGoMusic (GOGO 010)
- EP VINYL „Kana“ – Raw Artistic Soul, GoGoMusic (GOGO 012)
- CD „Der Einzug in den Kontrabass“ – Sara Camatta (audio book) (Carl Löwe Edition, 2004)
- CD „What About Love“ – Raw Artistic Soul, GoGoMusic (GOCD 002, 2005)
- CD „True Khoisan“ – Laygwan Sharkie (2005)
- CD „GO!“ – Various Artists (GOCD 001, 2005)
- EP VINYL „What About Love EP“ – Raw Artistic Soul (GOGO 014, 2005)
- CD-Single „Welcome To Deutschland“ – Trovaci, Ignoring Gravity Music (IGM 06-06, 2006)
- CD „GO!!“ – Various Artists (GOCD 003, 2006)
- LP 12" „Miami Theme & Fela Brasil“ – Raw Artistic Soul, GoGoMusic (GOGO 020, 2006)
- CD „You Got Rhythm Too“ – Raw Artistic Soul, GoGoMusic (GOCD 004, 2007)
- CD-Single „Paradies“ – Trovaci, Ignoring Gravity Music (IGM 07-08, 2007)
- CD „Kuku Lele“ – Trovaci, Ignoring Gravity Music (IGM 07-07, 2007)
- CD „Green Is For Push, Red Is For Pull“ – Soo-Jung Kae, Chang-U Choi & Bojan Vuletić, Ignoring Gravity Music (IGM 07-09, 2007)
- CD-Single „Kako Tako“ – Trovaci, Ignoring Gravity Music (IGM 07-10)
- EP „Moonshiners“ – Moonshiners (EGG Music Korea, 2008)
- LP „Squidco“ – Paul Lytton & Nate Wooley (Broken Research Music, USA, 2008)
- CD „Berlin“ – Tango del Sur West Wind Latina (WW2254)
- DVD „Polyphonie at Philharmonie Duisburg 2008“ (Institut für Bildung und Kultur, 2008)
- CD „A View Amazing“ – Vera Westera, Ignoring Gravity Music (IGM 08-11, 2008)
- DVD „Polyphonie at Philharmonie Duisburg 2009“ – Benny Stolz (Institut für Bildung und Kultur, 2009)
- CD „Creek above 33“ – Paul Lytton & Nate Wooley (PSI Records, USA, 2010)
- CD „Malo Morgen“ – Trovaci, Electrique Mud Records (MUD007-2, 2010)
- CD „Atemwende“ – Nate Wooley & MIVOS quartet, Ignoring Gravity Music (IGM 12-13, 2013)

== Selected publications ==
- Hans Steingen, Bojan Vuletić: In aller Stille (Die Toten Hosen). Songbook, Bosworth 2009.
- Flavia Nebauer, Bojan Vuletić: Musik mit älteren Migranten. published in „Kulturkompetenz 50+ – Praxiswissen für die Kulturarbeit mit Älteren“, published by Kim de Groote, Almuth Fricke, kopaed, 2010.
