= A Place for Myself =

- Release date: 2016
- Running time: 22 mins
- Language: Kinyarwanda

A Place for Myself is a Rwandan short film released in 2016.

== Plot ==
Set in Rwanda, the film tells the story of a 5 year old Elikia with albinism, who struggles in the face of discrimination and stigma at primary school. With her mother, she fights back against discrimination.

== Reception ==
The film premiered at the Goethe Institut in Kigali. It was also shown at the 2017 Toronto Black Film Festival and the 2017 Milano Film Festival. It gained three awards, including the Ousmane Sembene Award, at the Zanzibar International Film Festival (ZIFF), and won a Tanit bronze award at the Carthage Film Festival in 2016.
