= Alain Gomis =

French-Senegalese film director (born 1972)

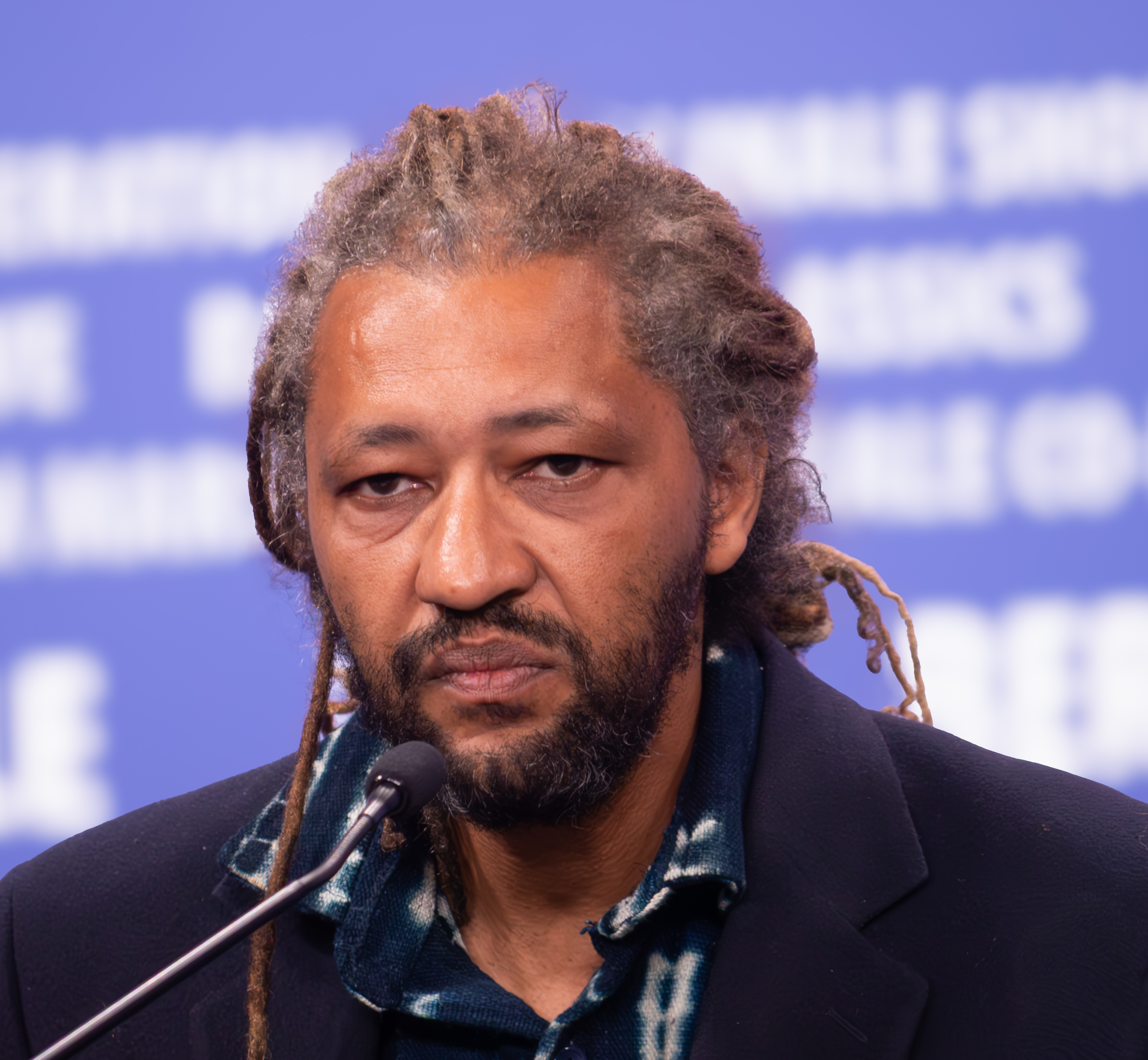
- Gomis at the 2026 Berlinale
- Born: 6 March 1972 (age 54); France
- Occupations: Film director; Screenwriter; Producer
- Years active: 1999–present

Alain Gomis (born 6 March 1972) is a French-Senegalese film director, screenwriter, and producer. He is best known for his films about contemporary life in West Africa, exploring rituals, memory, and culture. His 2017 feature film Félicité won the Silver Bear Grand Jury Prize at the Berlinale, while Today (2012) and Dao (2026) were selected in competition for the Golden Bear. He is co-founder of the film production company Granit Films, in Paris.

== Early life and education ==
Alain Gomis was born in France on 6 March 1972, of a Senegalese father and French mother. He grew up in France.

Gomis studied art history, and in 1993 graduated with a master's degree in film studies at the Sorbonne in Paris.

== Career ==
After graduating, Gomis ran video production workshops for immigrant youth in Nanterre. He then started making short films, the first three being the documentary Caramels et chocolats (Caramels and chocolates, 12 min., 1996), Tout le monde peut se tromper (Everyone can make a mistake; 8 mins, 1998), and Tourbillons (Whirlwinds, 13 min., 1999). Tourbillons was screened at Clermont-Ferrand, New York, and Namur film festivals.

Many of Gomis' films centre around contemporary life in West Africa, exploring rituals, memory, and culture. Gomis' first feature film was L'Afrance (As a Man), released in 2001, which won the Silver Leopard at the 2002 Locarno Film Festival. With dialogue in Wolof and French, the story follows a young Senegalese man who has come to Paris to receive a good education help his home country when he returns. Completely unexpectedly, he encounters a problem with his residence papers because he had arranged an extension too late. It stars Djolof Mbengue in the lead role as El Hadj, along with Delphine Zingg, Samir Guesmi, Théophile Sowié, and Bass Dhem. His 2006 short film, Ahmed (24 mins), also stars Samir Guesmi.

His next feature, released in 2007, was Andalucia, which screened at the Venice Film Festival. His 2012 film Today (Tey/Aujourd'hui), which was made on location in Senegal, was selected in competition for the Golden Bear at the Berlinale, and won the Golden Stallion award at FESPACO, which was the first time that a Senegalese film had been awarded this top honour. It was also screened at other film festivals. In 2013 his 90-minute comedy telemovie Les Délices du monde screened on France 2.

His 2017 film Félicité was selected as the Senegalese entry for the Best Foreign Language Film at the 90th Academy Awards, making the December shortlist. It won another Golden Stallion for Gomis at FESPACO, as well as the Silver Bear Grand Jury Prize at the Berlinale.

In 2022, Gomis released this first documentary film, Rewind & Play, about American jazz pianist and composer Thelonious Monk. It was selected to screen in the Forum section of Berlinale, and given a good review in the New York Times.

Dao is a drama film that was made in France and Guinea-Bissau. Gomis described the project as his most personal work. It had its world premiere at the Berlin International Film Festival on 14 February 2026, where it was nominated for the Golden Bear, and was released in French cinemas on 29 April 2026.

== Granit Films ==
In 2009, he co-founded the production company Granit Films in Paris, with Nigerian filmmaker Newton Aduaka and Valérie Osouf, a French filmmaker who had lived in Senegal for nine years. By 2018, the company had released five feature films and seven shorts, several of which had won awards. Osouf directed the 2017 documentary feature about the Mauritanian director Abderrahmane Sissako, titled Abderrahmane Sissako: Beyond Territories.

== Other activities ==
In 2019, Gomis, along with Aissatou Diop, established the Yennenga Center in Dakar, Senegal, with the aim of promoting the production of independent films production in Senegal and elsewhere in Africa. Gomis is managing director of the centre as of 2022.

== Filmography ==
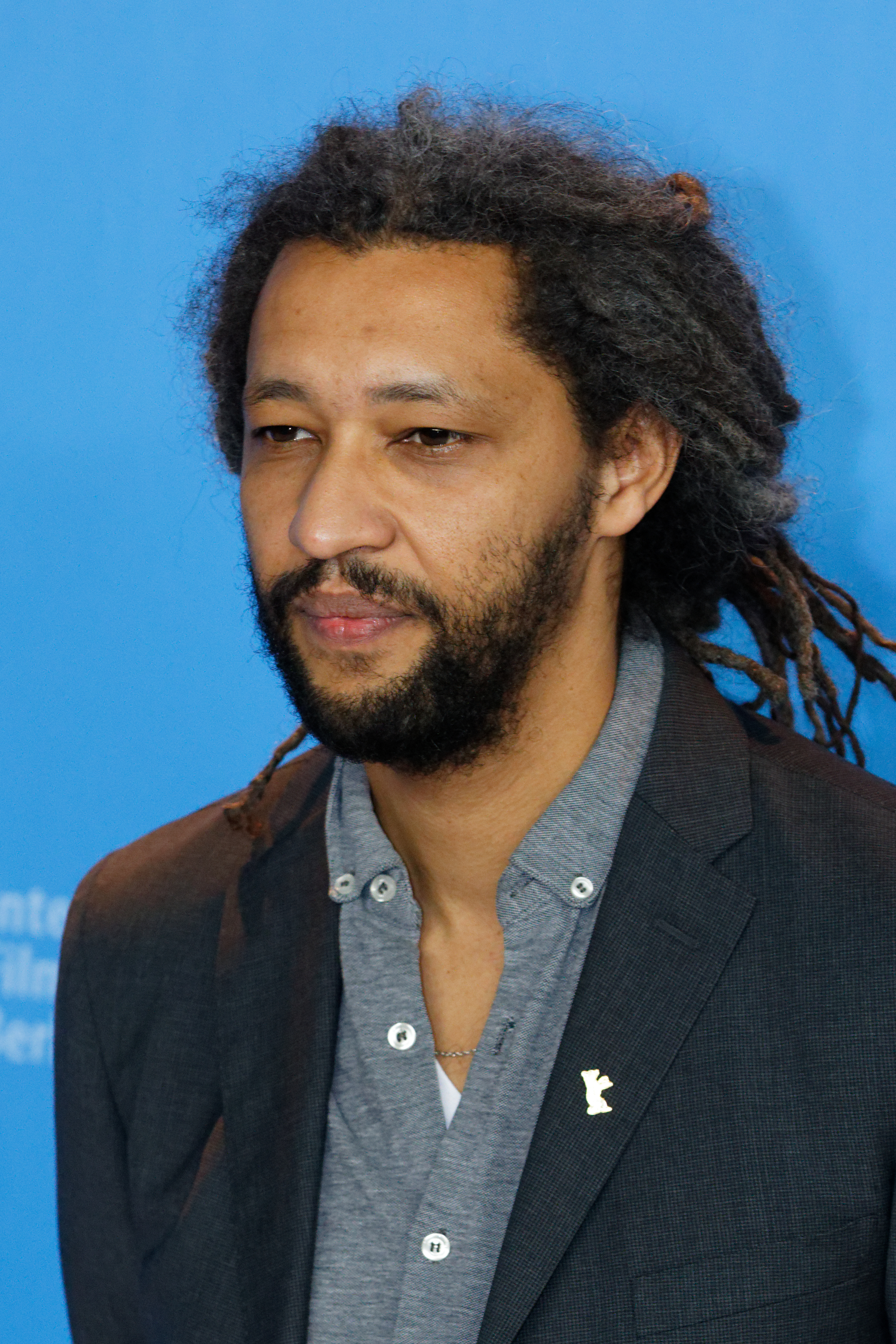
Gomis at the 2017 Berlinale

=== Feature films ===
| Year | English Title | Original Title | Notes |
|---|---|---|---|
| 2001 | As a Man | L'Afrance (As a Man) | Silver Leopard at 2002 Locarno Film Festival |
| 2007 | Andalucia | | |
| 2012 | Today | Aujourd'hui / Tey | |
| 2013 | Les Délices du monde | Telemovie | |
| 2017 | Félicité | | Silver Bear Grand Jury Prize winner |
| 2026 | Dao | | Nominated for the Golden Bear |

=== Short films ===
| Year | English Title | Original Title | Notes |
|---|---|---|---|
| 1999 | Whirlwinds | Tourbillons | |
| 2003 | Petite Lumière | | Made in Senegal. |
| 2006 | Ahmed | | |
| 2019 | [Unnamed] | | 1-minute segment shot on an iPhone, in 30/30 Vision: 3 Decades of Strand Releasing, an anthology film made by Strand Releasing |

=== Documentaries ===
| Year | Title | Notes |
|---|---|---|
| 2022 | Rewind & Play | Music documentary on Thelonious Monk |
