= The CEO =

2016 Nigerian film

- Theatrical poster
- Directed by: Kunle Afolayan
- Screenplay by: Tunde Babalola
- Starring: Kemi Lala Akindoju; Hilda Dokubo; Jimmy Jean-Louis; Angélique Kidjo; Wale Ojo
- Cinematography: Dawid Pietkiewicz
- Edited by: Laja Adebayo
- Music by: Kulanen Ikyo
- Production company: Golden Effects
- Release date: May 4, 2016
- Running time: 105 minutes
- Country: Nigeria

The CEO is a 2016 Nigerian film directed by Kunle Afolayan, starring Kemi Lala Akindoju, Hilda Dokubo, Jimmy Jean-Louis, Angélique Kidjo and Wale Ojo. The film premiered at the Eko Hotels and Suites on July 10, 2016. The film was screened at the Toronto International Film Festival. The London premiere was held in October 2016 at Leicester Square Vue Cinema.

== Cast ==
- Kemi Lala Akindoju as Lisa
- Hilda Dokubo as Superintendent Ebenezer
- Jimmy Jean-Louis as Jean-marc
- Angélique Kidjo as Dr. Zara Zimmerman
- Wale Ojo as Kola
- Peter Nzioki as Jomo
- Rico Panagio as Riikard
- Aurelie Eliam as Eloise
- Fatym Layachi as Yasmin
- Feige as Mr. Cheng
- Allen Wu as M. Cheng's Associate
- Vivian Chenxue Lu as Mr. Cheng's Associate
- Ainea Ojiambo as Hakeem
- Olabode Tokosi as Alaye
- Alexandros Konstrantaras as Bermudez
- Adekunle Gold as Musician
- Leah Moyo as Becky

== Plot ==
Five of the top members of a company are sent to a retreat, and they are told that one of them will become the new CEO. The cordial atmosphere quickly turns into a competition to see who can outdo all the others.

== Reception ==
Chioma Nwanna of BellaNaija praised the production, casting and location of the film. She noted in her review that the grammatical correctness in the dialogue by Tade Ogidan was top -otch. She went further to say W that ale Ojo and Nico Panagio playing "Kola Alabi" and Riikard Van Outen, respectively, were high pointsin the character depictions of the film but felt Kemi Lala’s role wasn't convincing. She also observed that Afolayan's use of many languages in his films gives a special impression. The trail of mystery murder was identified to shape most Aof folayan's movie s successfully, but, in this case, Nwanna felt the storyline surrounding the deaths wasn't properly orchestrated. It concluded its review by saying ,"Okay, happy thoughts and positive vibes. It really was a good film. Just wish it cleaned up better. ut hey, I could give it a second watch and see how that works out."

Chidumga Izuzu of Pulse Nigeria captioned its review from the description that it was "... a serious film that does not offer the conventional entertainment that most viewers seek from Nollywood movies". It ended with a summary that "The CEO" might not be Afolayan's best work, but it is a highly engaging piece of work that grips your attention for a greater part of it, and has you guessing, asking lots of questions, thinking, and solving mysteries". YNaija described the lack of awards for the film at the 2017 AMVCA as a welcome development and something "pleasant".
