= Nomonde Mbusi =

South African actress

- Born: 29 May 1976 (age 49); Durban, KwaMashu
- Education: Dramatic Arts, University of Zululand
- Alma mater: University of Zululan
- Occupation: Actress
- Known for: Usindiso
- Notable work: Vaya

Nomonde Mbusi (born 29 March 1976) is a South African actress. In 2017, she was nominated for Africa Movie Academy Award for Best Actress in a Supporting Role for her role as "Thobeka" in Vaya.

== Career ==
Mbusi is an alumnus of University of Zululand, where she studied Dramatic Arts. In 2016, she played "Thobeka" in Akin Omotoso's Vaya. The role got her best supporting actress nomination at Africa Movie Academy Awards, with Omotoso winning the award for best director. The film also won several international awards, including being the opening film at African Film Festival. Mbusi played "Ayanda" in Ubizo. She also featured as "Ziyanda" in Tsha Tsha IV. She had a brief spell as "Mokopi" in Generations. She acted as "Felicia" in 4Play: Sex Tips for Girls in 2012. She has also done theatrical works, such as Flipping the Script as the character "Fikile". Her television appearance also include a character in Usindiso

=== Selected filmography ===
- Usindiso (2007-2008) Brenda
- Ubizo:The Calling (2007) as Ayanda
- Vaya (2016) as Thobeka
- Generations
- A Queen's Lobola (2023) as Mayor Mpho
- Intlawulo (2024) as Nowanele
- Lakhe's Matric (2024) as Sibongile

== Personal life ==
Mbusi was born May 29, 1976, in Durban, Kwa Mashu.
