= Oloibiri (film) =

2016 Nigerian action thriller

- Directed by: Curtis Graham
- Screenplay by: Samantha Iwowo
- Produced by: Rogers Ofime
- Starring: Olu Jacobs; Richard Mofe Damijo, William R Moses, Taiwo Ajai Lycette
- Release date: October 21, 2016
- Country: Nigeria

Oloibiri is a 2016 Nigerian action thriller film directed by Curtis Graham, produced by Rogers Ofime and starring Olu Jacobs and Richard Mofe Damijo. The film tells a story on how government agencies, along with oil companies exploited the newly discovered oil in the historic town of Oloibiri. The film had its premier on 21 October 2016 at the Shell Nigeria hall, Muson center, Onikan. Former head of state, General Yakubu Gowon, former Secretary general, Commonwealth, Emeka Anyaoku were present at the event. Speaking to Channels TV after watching the film, former Minister for Information, Professor Jerry Gana described the film as having a "clear and powerful message" on the sufferings of people in the Niger Delta. He also encouraged other filmmakers to make more of such films. Richard Mofe Damijo, who played the role of a disgruntled indigene, who became a militant, "Gunpowder" in the oil rich town described his role as a "modern day Robinhood". He also stated that he hopes government and international organizations will come to the aid of people in Niger Delta.

== Cast ==
- Reeko Brooks as Militia
- Diana Colmar-Espinosa as Newscaster
- Payton Dunham as Anderson
- Bradley Gordon as Dobra
- William R. Moses as Powell
- Segun Arinze
- Olu Jacobs as Timipre
- Richard Mofe Damijo as Gunpowder
- Taiwo Ajai-Lycett as Ibiere
- Ivie Okujaye as Chisom
- Daniel K Daniel as Yisa
- Clem Ohameze as President
- Dennis Oglafa as Dogo

== Plot ==
When crude oil was discovered in Oloibiri in 1956, an educated Timipre (Olu Jacobs) could not influence his kin to demand that they have control over how the oil company extracts the oil, and ensure that their people are employed in decent positions in the companies because they were satisfied with the minute promises of the LESH company- a fictitious representation of Shell-BP. After many years, he is now tormented by his past- the catastrophe that befell the people of Oloibiri.

However, Boma, aka Gunpowder (Richard Mofe-Damijo), a graduate of geology and a former employee of LESH, and his gang have become vigilantes in the oil-rich region and proving the nemesis of white companies and locals looking to further exploit the area. Gunpowder kills his former partner, Dogo, whom he accuses of greed.

However, things get pacier when news arrives that there’s been an approval for Foreshaw to extract oil from Otuagbagi, a nearby community- a deal worth $300 million in revenue each year. But Gunpowder had infiltrated Forshaw and has a spy working as a personal assistant to the founder and director of the organisation, Mr. Powell (William R. Moses). The spy, Powell’s PA, Azu (Dayton Sinkia) helps Gunpowder deliver a mail to Powell in a bid to dissuade Foreshaw from continuing with the plan. Powell finds pictures of malnourished Nigerian children and those affected by crude oil poisoning inside the envelope.

Nevertheless, Powell has good intentions for the communities and wants to help solve their problems, unlike other oil companies. He decides to visit Nigeria to see things for himself with the help of their Nigerian representative, Cyril Beke (TK Bello). Cyril seldom cares about the state of the communities and is only interested in enriching his pocket.

Powell arrives in Nigeria but his convoy including Cyril, and a group of soldiers, is ambushed by heavily armed Gunpowder and his men. Powell initially escapes with the help of a soldier and is found by Timipre’s grandson’s love interest, a doctor who takes Powell to Timipre’s house. Timipre threatens to take Powell to Gunpowder, but the lovers manage to convince him to help Powell. He eventually agrees and connives with Gunpowder’s mother to find a haven for Powell. Meanwhile security personnel were already aware of the attempted kidnap.

Whereas Azu and Dobra, Gunpowder’s accomplices in the US have kidnapped Powell’s family and his second in command (Mr. Sheen), ransoming him to initiate a cancellation of the Oil Mining Lease (OML). However, an exasperated Gunpowder eventually captures Timipre, his grandson, the doctor and Powell. The OML is now cancelled but Gunpowder reneges on his agreement with Azu and Dobra to release Powel when the OML is cancelled, insisting that Powell and the likes of Cyril Beke must pay with their blood.

Infuriated by Gunpowder’s betrayal and blood lust, Azu reports himself to the police and reveals Gunpowder’s hideout. In the meantime, Timipre, his grandson, the doctor, and Powell were escaping captive after Timipre kills one of Gunpowder’s boys.

Heavily armed soldiers then attack Gunpowder’s hideout, outnumbering and overpowering them. Gunpowder is shut down from his watchtower and as he falls, a glass cup falls and shatters from the hands of his mother, a sign that his son had died. Then we see a younger version of him in front of an altar with a Rosary, saying, “Father please bless my Rosary.” Upon landing, his body is soaked in a pool of crude oil pouring from the top.

The movie ends with a newspaper report that Timipre has become a representative of the community and will be working together with Foreshaw in the best interest of the locals.

== Reception ==
Wilfred Okitche of 360nobs.com summarized its review by concluding that the film doesn't "... tell the Niger Delta story in a deeply effective and engaging manner, but it is a bloody decent start".

Chimdusa Izuzu of Pulse Nigeria highlighted in her review that the question of who should be accused of the underdevelopment of the area despite the fact that the place was the first area where oil was discovered.

Awards and nominations
Year	Award	Category	Result	Ref.
2017	Best of Nollywood Awards	Movie with the Best Special Effect	Nominated	
2017	Best of Nollywood Awards	Movie with the Best Screenplay	Nominated	
2017	Best of Nollywood Awards	Movie with the Best Soundtrack	Nominated	
2017	Best of Nollywood Awards	Movie with the Best Production Design	Won	
2017	Best of Nollywood Awards	Movie with the Best Cinematography	Nominated	
2017	Best of Nollywood Awards	Movie of the Year	Nominated	
