= Zimkhitha Nyoka =

South African actress (born 1990)

- Born: Zimkhitha Athos Nyoka; October 6, 1992 (age 33)
- Education: High school: Lady Grey Arts Academy
- Occupation: Actress
- Known for: Vaya, Isithembiso

Zimkhitha Nyoka (born October 6, 1990) is a South African actress known for her role in Akin Omotoso's, Vaya (2016). She previously acted in Mutual Friends by Norman Maake. She was nominated for Africa Movie Academy Award for Best Actress in a Leading Role for her role in the film.

In 2016, she was reported to be playing "Olwethu" in the South African television series, Gold Diggers. Reflecting on her role in the film, she noted that she had similar experiences while seeking admission. She emphasized the need for government to make education more affordable Other local soaps, she acted includes "Anathi" in Isithembiso, "Badanile Nqoloba" in Mutual Friends (2014) and "Nash" in Ngempela.

In 2010, she finished from Lady Grey Art Academy, graduating with distinction. Afterwards, she proceeded to University of Johannesburg to study a degree in Science. While studying Zimkhitha was part of the UJ Arts Center where she acted in plays like Romeo and Juliet Unplugged as Juliet, Dance the Dance by Tristian Jacobs and many more. She then quit her studies when she got her first TV role lead character Badanile On SABC 1's Mutual Friends. The Actor enjoys singing as well. She did musicals and a cappella group singing when she was in University. She blames her failed attempt at a Biochemistry and Botany degree on the many productions and societies she was part of in Varsity.

In 2016, she revealed her parents are supportive of her career even though, while growing up, she was a science student until grade 10 when she transferred to a drama school. In an Instagram post, she disclosed that Generations (South African TV series) actor, Jaftha Mamabolo was her idol in the entertainment industry.

== Filmography ==
- Mutual Friends (2014) as Badanile Nqoloba
- Matatiele (2015) as Nontle Sangqu
- Vaya (2016)
