= Vaya (film) =

2016 film

- Film poster
- Directed by: Akin Omotoso
- Starring: Phuthi Nakene; Azwile Chamane-Madiba; Warren Masemola
- Release dates: 9 September 2016 (TIFF); 27 October 2017 (South Africa)
- Running time: 110 minutes
- Country: South Africa
- Language: Zulu

Vaya is a 2016 South African drama film directed by Akin Omotoso. It was screened in the Contemporary World Cinema section at the 2016 Toronto International Film Festival.

== Cast ==
- Phuthi Nakene as Patricia
- Warren Masemola as Xolani
- Azwile Chamane-Madiba as Zodwa
- Nomonde Mbusi as Thobeka
- Harriet Manamela as Grace
- Sihle Xaba as Nhlanhla
- Zimkhitha Nyoka as Zanele
- Sibusiso Msimang as Nkulu

== Reception ==
Review aggregation website Rotten Tomatoes gives the film an approval rating of 100% based on 6 reviews and an average rating of 10/10.
