= Félicité (2017 film) =

2017 film

- Film poster
- Directed by: Alain Gomis
- Written by: Alain Gomis; Olivier Loustau; Delphine Zingg
- Produced by: Arnaud Dommerc
- Starring: Véro Tshanda Beya Mputu
- Cinematography: Céline Bozon
- Edited by: Fabrice Rouaud
- Music by: Kasai Allstars and Orchestre Symphonique Kimbanguiste
- Distributed by: Jour2Fête (France); Strand Releasing (United States)
- Release date: 11 February 2017 (Berlin)
- Running time: 123 minutes
- Countries: France; Senegal
- Languages: Lingala; French
- Box office: $259,098

Félicité is a 2017 Senegalese drama film set in the Democratic Republic of the Congo and directed by Alain Gomis. It was selected to compete for the Golden Bear in the main competition section of the 67th Berlin International Film Festival. At Berlin, the film won the Jury Grand Prix award. At the 2017 Africa Movie Academy Awards, it won six awards which is the highest for a film in the history of the award ceremony, including categories for best film, best actress, best supporting actor, best editing, best soundtrack and best film in an African language.

It was selected as the Senegalese entry for the Best Foreign Language Film at the 90th Academy Awards, making the December shortlist. It was the first time Senegal had sent a film for consideration for the Best Foreign Language film. It also won the 2017 Film Award of the Council of Europe.

== Plot ==
The film tells the story of how a bar entertainer struggles to get funds after her child is hospitalized.

== Cast ==
- Véro Tshanda Beya Mputu as Félicité
- Gaetan Claudia as Samo
- Papi Mpaka as Tabu
- Nadine Ndebo as Hortense
- Elbas Manuana as Luisant
- Kasai Allstars as themselves

== Reception ==
On review aggregator website Rotten Tomatoes, the film has an approval rating of 98% based on 46 reviews, and an average rating of 7.3/10. The website's critical consensus states: "Félicité depicts a culture and a setting unfamiliar to many viewers, but its themes - and Véro Tshanda Beya Mputu's performance - transcend borders". On Metacritic, which assigns a weighted average score, the film holds a score of 75 out of 100, based on reviews from 13 critics, indicating "generally favorable reviews". Jordan Mintzer of The Hollywood Reporter described the film as "rough and heartfelt".

== See also ==
- List of submissions to the 90th Academy Awards for Best Foreign Language Film
- List of Senegalese submissions for the Academy Award for Best Foreign Language Film
