= 49th Karlovy Vary International Film Festival =

2014 film festival edition

The 49th Karlovy Vary International Film Festival took place from 4 to 12 July 2014. The Crystal Globe was won by Corn Island, a Georgian drama film directed by Giorgi Ovashvili. The second prize, the Special Jury Prize was won by Free Fall, a Hungarian comedy film directed by György Pálfi.

== Juries ==
The following people formed the juries of the festival:

Main competition

- Luis Miñarro, Grand Jury President (Spain)
- Mira Fornay (Slovakia)
- Phedon Papamichael (Greece)
- Kjartan Sveinsson (Iceland)
- Viktor Tauš (Czech Republic)

Documentaries

- Philippa Kowarsky, Chairman (Israel)
- Oskar Alegria (Spain)
- Tomáš Bojar (Czech Republic)

East of the West

- Ahmet Boyacıoğlu, Chairman (Turkey)
- Ivana Ivišić (Croatia)
- Levan Koguashvili (Georgia)
- Amanda Livanou (Greece)
- Tomasz Wasilewski (Poland)

== Official selection awards ==
The following feature films and people received the official selection awards:

- Crystal Globe (Grand Prix) - Corn Island (Simindis kundzuli) by Giorgi Ovashvili (Georgia, Germany, France, Czech Republic, Kazakhstan)
- Special Jury Prize - Free Fall (Szabadesés) by György Pálfi (Hungary, France, South Korea)
- Best Director Award - György Pálfi for Free Fall ( Szabadesés) (Hungary, France, South Korea)
- Best Actress Award - Elle Fanning for her role in Low Down (USA)
- Best Actor Award - Nahuel Pérez Biscayart for his role in All Yours (Je suis à toi) (Belgium, Canada)

== Other statutory awards ==
Other statutory awards that were conferred at the festival:

- Best documentary film (over 30 min) - Waiting for August by Teodora Ana Mihai (Belgium)
  - Special Mention - Steadiness (Sitzfleisch) by Lisa Weber (Austria)
- Best documentary film (under 30 min) - Autofocus by Boris Poljak (Croatia)
  - Special Mention - The Queen (La reina) by Manuel Abramovich (Argentina)
- East of the West Award - Corrections Class (Klass korrektsii) by Ivan Tverdovskiy (Russia, Germany)
  - Special Mention - Barbarians (Varvari) by Ivan Ikić (Serbia, Montenegro, Slovenia)
- Forum of Independents Award - Anywhere Else (Anderswo) by Ester Amrami (Germany)
- Crystal Globe for Outstanding Artistic Contribution to World Cinema - Mel Gibson (USA), William Friedkin (USA)
- Festival President's Award for Contribution to Czech Cinematography - Zdeněk Svěrák (Czech Republic)
- Audience Award - The Magic Voice of a Rebel (Magický hlas rebelky) by Olga Sommerová (Czech Republic)

== Non-statutory awards ==
The following non-statutory awards were conferred at the festival:

- FIPRESCI International Critics Award: Rocks in My Pockets (animated film) by Signe Baumane (USA, Latvia)
- Prize of the Ecumenical Jury: Corn Island (Simindis kundzuli) by Giorgi Ovashvili (Georgia, Germany, France, Czech Republic, Kazakhstan)
  - Special Mention: Rocks in My Pockets (animated film) by Signe Baumane (USA, Latvia)
- FEDEORA Award (East of the West section): Bota by Iris Elezi & Thomas Logoreci (Albania, Italy, Kosovo)
- Europa Cinemas Label: Free Fall ( Szabadesés) by György Pálfi (Hungary, France, South Korea)
