= 46th Karlovy Vary International Film Festival =

Film festival held in 2011

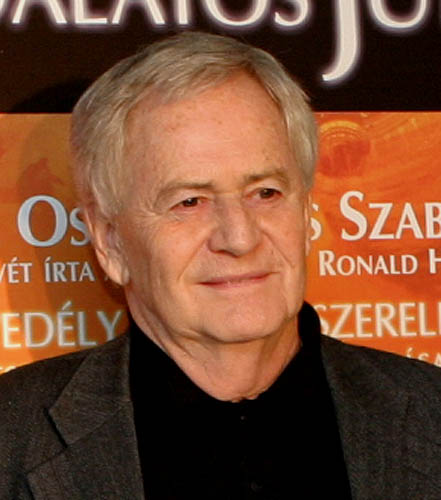
István Szabó, Grand Jury President

The 46th Karlovy Vary International Film Festival took place from 1 to 9 July 2011. The Crystal Globe was won by Restoration, an Israeli drama film directed by Yossi Madmoni. The second prize, the Special Jury Prize was won by Gypsy, a Slovak drama film directed by Martin Šulík. Hungarian film director, screenwriter, and opera director István Szabó was the Grand Jury President of the festival.

== Juries ==
The following people formed the juries of the festival:

Main competition

- István Szabó, Grand Jury President (Hungary)
- Vladimír Balko (Slovakia)
- Michel Ciment (France)
- Michel Demopoulos (Greece)
- Edna Fainaru (Israel)
- Sibel Kekilli (Germany)
- Pavel Strnad (Czech Republic)

Documentaries

- Amir Bar-Lev, Chairman (United States)
- Pietro Marcello (Italy)
- Freddy Olsson (Sweden)
- Harri Römpötti (Finland)
- Andrea Slováková (Slovakia)

East of the West

- Rossitsa Valkanova, Chairwoman (Bulgaria)
- Sitora Alieva (Russia)
- Stefan Arsenijević (Serbia)
- Matthieu Darras (France)
- Łukasz Dzięcioł (Poland)

== Official selection awards ==
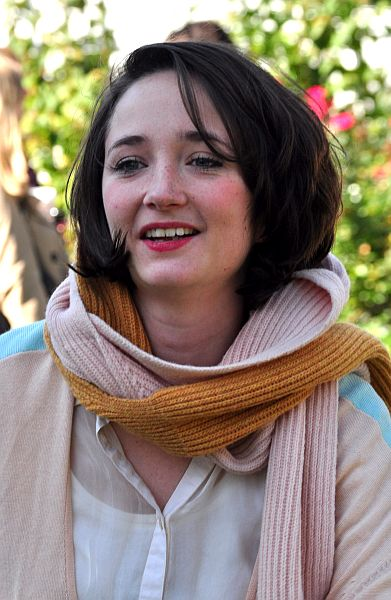
Stine Fischer Christensen Best Actress

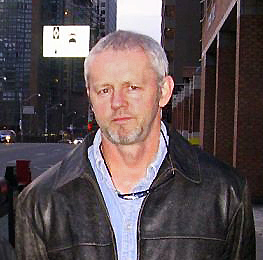
David Morse, Best Actor

The following feature films and people received the official selection awards:

- Crystal Globe (Grand Prix) – Restoration (Boker Tov Adon Fidelman) by Yossi Madmoni (Israel)
- Special Jury Prize – Gypsy (Cigán) by Martin Šulík (Slovakia, Czech Republic)
- Best Director Award – Pascal Rabaté for Holidays by the Sea (Ni à vendre ni à louer) (France)
- Best Actress Award – Stine Fischer Christensen for her role in Cracks in the Shell (Die Unsichtbare) (Denmark)
- Best Actor Award – David Morse for his role in Collaborator (Canada, United States)
- Special mention of the jury – Ján Mižigár for his role in Gypsy (Cigán) by Martin Šulík (Slovakia, Czech Republic)

== Other statutory awards ==
Other statutory awards that were conferred at the festival:

- Best documentary film (over 30 min) - Familia by Mikael Wiström & Alberto Herskovits (Sweden)
  - Special Mention - Tinar by Mahdi Moniri (Iran)
- Best documentary film (under 30 min) - The River (Upe) by Julia Gruodienė & Rimantas Gruodis (Lithuania)
- East of the West Award - Punk is not Dead by Vladimir Blaževski (Macedonia)
- Crystal Globe for Outstanding Artistic Contribution to World Cinema - Dame Judi Dench (United Kingdom)
- Festival President's Award - Jude Law (United Kingdom)
- Právo Audience Award - Oldboys by Nikolaj Steen (Denmark)

== Non-statutory awards ==
The following non-statutory awards were conferred at the festival:

- FIPRESCI International Critics Award: Hitler in Hollywood (Hitler à Hollywood) by Frédéric Sojcher (Belgium, France, Italy)
- Ecumenical Jury Award: Another Sky (Drugoje něbo) by Dmitri Mamulia (Russia)
- FICC - The Don Quixote Prize: Gypsy (Cigán) by Martin Šulík (Slovak Republic, Czech Republic)
  - Special Mention: Lollipop Monster by Ziska Riemann (Germany)
- FEDEORA Award (East of the West section): Marija's Own (Marijine)
- Europa Cinemas Label: Gypsy (Cigán) by Martin Šulík (Slovak Republic, Czech Republic)
- NETPAC Award (ex aequo): Once Upon a Time in Anatolia (Bir Zamanlar Anadolu'da) by Nuri Bilge Ceylan (Turkey, Bosnia and Herzegovina)
