= 1995 Czech Lion Awards =

Czech film award ceremony

3rd Czech Lion Awards
- Date: March 2, 1996
- Site: Lucerna, Prague
- Hosted by: Martin Dejdar

Highlights
- Best Picture: The Garden
- Most awards: The Garden (5)
- Most nominations: The Garden (11)

Television coverage
- Network: Česká televize

1995 Czech Lion Awards ceremony was held on 2 March 1996.

== Winners and nominees ==
| Best Film | Best Director |
|---|---|
| The Garden | Martin Šulík — The Garden |
| Best Actor in a Leading Role | Best Actress in a Leading Role |
| Martin Dejdar — The Dance Teacher | Jiřina Bohdalová — Fany |
| Best Actor in a Supporting Role | Best Actress in a Supporting Role |
| Marián Labuda — The Garden | Tereza Brodská — Revenge |
| Best Screenplay | Best Editing |
| The Garden | War of Colours |
| Design | Best Cinematography |
| The Garden | The Golet in the Valley - F. A. Brabec |
| Music | Sound |
| The Golet in the Valley | The Dance Teacher |
Unique Contribution to Czech Film
Karel Kachyňa

=== Non-statutory Awards ===
| Best Foreign Film | Most Popular Film |
|---|---|
| Léon: The Professional | Waterworld |
| Worst Film | Cinema Readers' Award |
| Wild Beer | Apollo 13 |
