= 35th Karlovy Vary International Film Festival =

2000 film festival edition

The 35th Karlovy Vary International Film Festival took place from 5 to 15 July 2000. The Crystal Globe was won by Me You Them, a Brazilian drama film directed by Andrucha Waddington. The second prize, the Special Jury Prize was won ex aequo by The Big Animal, a Polish comedy-drama film directed by Jerzy Stuhr, and by Peppermint Candy, a South Korean drama film directed by Lee Chang-dong. Iranian film director, screenwriter, poet, photographer and film producer Abbas Kiarostami was the president of the jury.

== Juries ==
The following people formed the juries of the festival:

Main competition

- Abbas Kiarostami, Jury President (Iran)
- Icíar Bollaín (Spain)
- Saša Gedeon (Czech Republic)
- Arik Kaplun (Israel)
- Srđan Karanović (Yugoslavia)
- Fred Roos (UK)
- Yermek Shinarbayev (Kazakhstan)
- Dana Vávrová (Germany)

Documentaries

- Richard Leacock, president (UK)
- Morando Morandini (Italy)
- Kristina Stojanová (Canada)
- Milos Stehlik (USA)
- Miroljub Vučkovič (Jugoslavia)

== Official selection awards ==
The following feature films and people received the official selection awards:

- Crystal Globe (Grand Prix) - Me You Them (Eu tu eles) by Andrucha Waddington (Brazil)
- Special Jury Prize (ex aequo)
  - The Big Animal (Duze zwirze) by Jerzy Stuhr (Poland)
  - Peppermint Candy (Bakha satang) by Lee Chang-dong (South Korea)
- Best Director Award - Vinko Brešan for Marshal Tito's Spirit (Maršal) (Croatia)
- Best Actress Award - Regina Casé for her role in Me You Them (Et tu eles) (Brazil)
- Best Actor Award(ex aequo)
  - Ian Hart for his role in Aberdeen (UK, Norway, Sweden)
  - Hamid Farokhnezad for his role in The Bride of Fire (Arous-e atash) (Iran)
- Special Jury Mention - A Question of Taste (Une affaire de goût) by Bernard Rapp (France) & Angels of the Universe (Englar alheimsins) by Friðrik Þór Friðriksson (Iceland)

== Other statutory awards ==
Other statutory awards that were conferred at the festival:

- Best documentary film (over 30 min.) - My Mother Had Fourteen Children (Min mamma hade fjorton barn) by Lars Lennart Forsberg (Sweden)
  - Special Jury Mention - The Sentence: The Accusation (Prisadata-Obvineniento) by Anna Petkova (Bulgaria) & Fighter by Amir Bar-Lev (USA, Czech Republic, Italy, Slovenia)
- Best documentary film (under 30 min.) - Part of the World That Belongs to You (Del av den värld som är din) by Karin Wegsjö (Sweden)
- Crystal Globe for Outstanding Artistic Contribution to World Cinema - Věra Chytilová (Czech Republic), Carlos Saura (Spain)
- Award of the Town of Karlovy Vary - Károly Makk (Hungary)
- Audience Award - Angela's Ashes by Alan Parker (UK, USA, Ireland)

== Non-statutory awards ==
The following non-statutory awards were conferred at the festival:

- FIPRESCI International Critics Award: Angels of the Universe (Englar alheimsins) by Friðrik Þór Friðriksson (Iceland)
  - Special Mention: Eeny Meeny (Ene bene) by Alice Nellis (Czech Republic)
- FICC - The Don Quixote Prize: Peppermint Candy (Bakha satang) by Lee Chang-dong (South Korea)
  - Special Mention: The Bride of Fire (Arous-e atash) by Khosrow Sinai (Iran) & No Place to Go (Die Unberührbare) by Oskar Roehler
- Ecumenical Jury Award: The Big Animal (Duze zwirze) by Jerzy Stuhr (Poland)
  - Special Mention: Long Night's Journey into Day by Deborah Hoffmann & Frances Reid (USA) & Paromitar Ek Din (en. House of Memories) by Aparna Sen (India)
- Philip Morris Film Award: Blonde Bride (Sari gyalin) by Yaver Rzayev (Azerbaijan)
- NETPAC Award: Yi Yi by Edward Yang (Taiwan, Japan)
  - Special Mention: Peppermint Candy (Bakha satang) by Lee Chang-dong (South Korea)
