= The Big Animal =

- Directed by: Jerzy Stuhr
- Written by: Screenplay: Krzysztof Kieślowski; Original short story: Kazimierz Orłoś
- Produced by: Sławomir Rogowski
- Starring: Anna Dymna; Jerzy Stuhr; Dominika Bednarczyk; Andrzej Franczyk; Stanisław Banaś; Krzysztof Gluchowski
- Cinematography: Paweł Edelman
- Edited by: Elżbieta Kurkowska
- Music by: Abel Korzeniowski
- Production companies: Oscilloscope; Milestone Films
- Release date: 2000
- Running time: 73 minutes
- Country: Poland
- Language: Polish

The Big Animal (Polish: Duże zwierzę) is a 2000 Polish film directed by Jerzy Stuhr from a screenplay by Krzysztof Kieślowski, based on a short story Wielbłąd (1995) by Kazimierz Orłoś.

== Plot ==
Mr. Zygmunt Sawicki is a bank employee, who finds a camel in his yard one day. He decides to take charge of it and he and his wife Marysia take care of it. However, problems arise for both his fellow town-dwellers and the local authorities.

== Cast ==
- Jerzy Stuhr as Zygmunt Sawicki
- Anna Dymna as Marysia Sawicka
- Andrzej Franczyk as Bank Manager
- Dominika Bednarczyk as Bank Clerk 1
- Błażej Wójcik as Bank Clerk 2
- Stanisław Banaś as Fire Chief
- Krzysztof Gluchowski as Mayor
- Feliks Szajnert as Drunkard

== Production ==
The film was shot in the following locations: Warsaw, Tymbark, Myślenice, Rabka.

== Awards ==
On 8 July 2000, the film was first released at the 35th Karlovy Vary International Film Festival, where it won the Special Jury Prize, in tie with Peppermint Candy.

== Home media ==
After distributing 35mm prints to theaters, Milestone Films released the film on DVD in 2003.

== Festivals ==
- AFI Fest 2000: The American Film Institute Los Angeles International Film Festival (International Competition) October 19–26, 2000.
- Karlovy Vary International Film Festival (in competition) July 5–15, 2000.
- London Film Festival (Cinema Europa) November 1–16, 2000.
- San Francisco International Film Festival April 19 - May 3, 2001.
- Sydney Film Festival June 8–22, 2001.
