= Czech Lion Award for Best Documentary =

Czech film award

- Country: Czech Republic
- First award: 2008
- Currently held by: Better Go Mad in the Wild
- Website: https://www.filmovaakademie.cz

Czech Lion Award for Best Documentary is an award given to the best Czech documentary.

== Winners ==
Year	English Name	Original Name	Director
2008	Citizen Havel	Občan Havel	Pavel Koutecký, Miroslav Janek
2009	Forgotten Transports to Poland	Zapomenuté transporty do Polska	Lukáš Přibyl
2010	Katka	Katka	Helena Třeštíková
2011	Solar Eclipse	Pod sluncem tma	Martin Mareček
2012	Love in the Grave	Láska v hrobě	David Vondráček
2013	Crooks	Šmejdi	Sylvie Dymáková
2014	Olga	Olga	Miroslav Janek
2015	Lean a Ladder Against Heaven	Opři žebřík o nebe	Jana Ševčíková
2016	Normal Autistic Film	Normální autistický film	Miroslav Janek
2017	Cervena	Červená	Olga Sommerová
2018	King Skate	King Skate	Šimon Šafránek
2019	Over the Hills	Dálava	Martin Mareček
2020	Caught in the Net	V síti	Vít Klusák, Barbora Chalupová
2021	Intensive Life Unit	Jednotka intenzivního života	Adéla Komrzý
2022	Art Talent Show	Zkouška umění	Adéla Komrzý, Tomáš Bojar, Jakub Wagner
2023	All Ends Well	Všechno dobře dopadne	Miroslav Janek
2024	I'm Not Everything I Want to Be	Ještě nejsem, kým chci být	Klára Tasovská
2025	Better Go Mad in the Wild	Raději zešílet v divočině	Miro Remo
