= Soul at Peace =

- Slovak: Pokoj v duši
- Directed by: Vladimír Balko
- Written by: Jiří Křižan
- Starring: Attila Mokos; Roman Luknár; Helena Krajčiová
- Cinematography: Martin Štrba
- Music by: Michał Lorenc
- Release date: 29 January 2009
- Running time: 93 minutes
- Country: Slovakia
- Language: Slovak

Soul at Peace (Slovak: Pokoj v duši) is a 2009 drama film directed by Vladimír Balko and starring Attila Mokos, Roman Luknár and Helena Krajčiová. It was written by Czech writer Jiří Křižan. At the 2010 ceremony for the Sun in a Net Awards, the film won in five categories including Best Film, Best Leading Actor (Attila Mokos), Best Supporting Actor (Roman Luknár), Best Supporting Actress (Helena Krajčiová) and Best Cinematography (Martin Štrba). The film won the Best Narrative award at the 2010 Kansas International Film Festival. Following its release in Slovakia, the film opened in July 2009 in the Czech Republic.

== Cast ==
- Attila Mokos as Tono
- Roman Luknár as Stefan
- Helena Krajčiová as Mária
