= Helena Krajčiová =

Slovak actress and singer

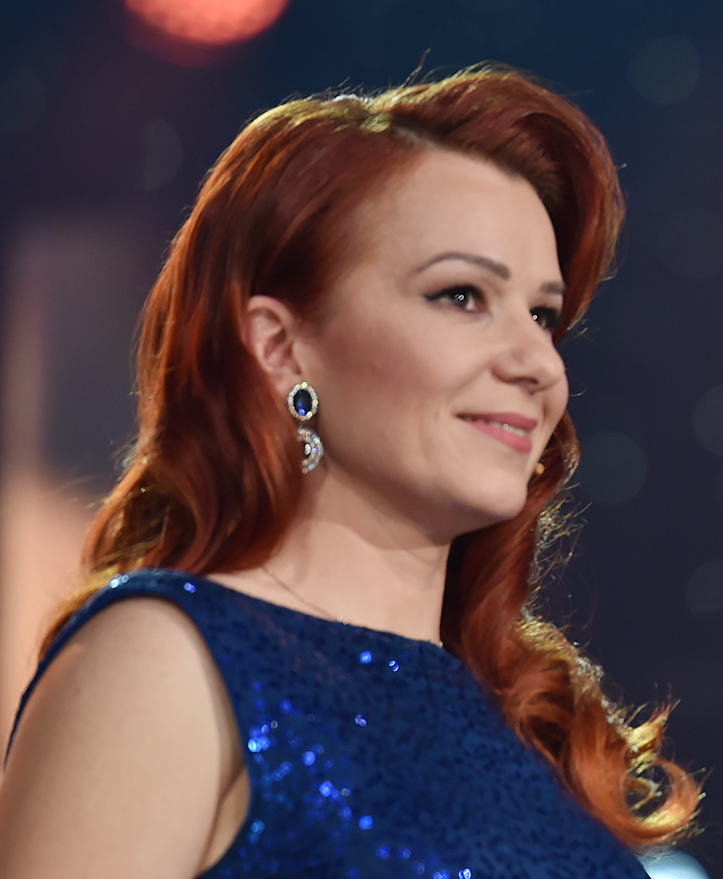
- Krajčiová in 2017
- Born: 19 April 1975 (age 51); Skalica, Czechoslovakia
- Occupation: Actress
- Years active: 2007–present

Helena Krajčiová (born 19 April 1975) is a Slovak actress and singer. At the 2010 Sun in a Net Awards she won the category of Best Supporting Actress, for her performance in the film Soul at Peace. Krajčiová was named Best Actress at the 14th OTO Awards.

== Selected filmography ==
- Panelák (television, 2008–2011)
- Soul at Peace (2009)
- Búrlivé víno (television, 2013–2017)
- The Red Captain (2016)
- Sestričky (television, 2018–2019)
- Nový život (television, 2020–2021)
- Invalid (2023)
