= Peppermint Candy =

1999 film by Lee Chang-dong

- Theatrical poster
- Hangul: 박하사탕
- Hanja: 薄荷砂糖
- RR: Bakhasatang
- MR: Pakhasat'ang
- Directed by: Lee Chang-dong
- Written by: Lee Chang-dong
- Produced by: Myeong Gye-nam; Makoto Ueda
- Starring: Sul Kyung-gu; Moon So-ri; Kim Yeo-jin
- Distributed by: Shindo Films; Cineclick Asia
- Release dates: October 14, 1999; (Busan International Film Festival); January 1, 2000 (South Korea)
- Running time: 130 minutes
- Country: South Korea
- Language: Korean
- Box office: $77,197

Peppermint Candy (Korean: 박하사탕; RR: Bakhasatang) is a 1999 South Korean tragedy film by Lee Chang-dong. The film opens with the suicide of the protagonist and uses reverse chronology to depict some of the key events of the past 20 years of his life that led to this point, with the seven segments of the film taking place in 1999, 1999, 1994, 1987, 1984, 1980, and 1979. Important historical events that inform the plot of the film include Coup d'état of May Seventeenth and the subsequent Gwangju Uprising (1980), the period of the Fifth Republic of Korea (1981-1988), June Democratic Struggle (1987), and the 1997 Asian financial crisis.

It was the ninth-highest-grossing domestic film of 2000 with 311,000 admissions in Seoul. It was well-received, especially at film festivals. Spurred by the success of Lee Chang-dong's directorial debut, Green Fish, Peppermint Candy was chosen as the opening film for the Busan International Film Festival in its first showing in 1999. It won multiple awards at the Karlovy Vary International Film Festival and won the Grand Bell Awards for best film of 2000.

== Plot ==
The film is divided into 7 sections, each dated and titled. They are presented here in the same order as in the film.

=== Outdoor Excursion: Spring 1999 ===
A group of friends are having a reunion picnic at a river. A man named Kim Young-ho wanders into the group; the others have not heard from him in 20 years, and have little awareness of his life during that time. After causing general mayhem with his deranged, anguished antics, he leaves and climbs atop a nearby train trestle; one of the group tries to convince him to abandon suicide, but the others ignore him. Facing an oncoming train, Young-ho screams, "I want to go back!"

=== The Camera: 3 days earlier, Spring 1999 ===
Young-ho is destitute and homeless. While driving around, he overhears a radio program announcing a reunion picnic. He spends his last money on a pistol and contemplates suicide. He visits the home of his former business partner and ex-wife Hong-ja, who refuses to let him in. Afterwards, the husband of his old flame Sun-im pays him a surprise visit. Young-ho is taken to visit a comatose Sun-im in a hospital, and gives her a tin of peppermint candies, the same ones she regularly mailed to him during his military service. After he leaves, the comatose Sun-im sheds a tear.

Before parting, Sun-im's husband gives Young-ho an old film camera, telling him she wanted Young-ho to have it. Desperate for money, he sells it at a pawn shop. As he is walking away from the pawn shop, the pawnbroker runs after Young-ho to tell him that there is film in the camera and give it to him. Later we see Young-ho rip the undeveloped film from its cartridge, thereby destroying it. He begins to cry as the scene fades.

=== Life is Beautiful: Summer 1994 ===
Young-ho is a seemingly successful businessman, running a local furniture store. When he learns from a private investigator he has hired that Hong-ja is having an affair with her driving instructor, Young-ho tails them to a love hotel and brutally beats both of them. Despite this, Young-ho is also having an affair with a secretary from work. They have sex in his car, then go to a restaurant together, where Young-ho encounters a man he has not seen since his career with the police. He tells the man while they are in the bathroom that life is beautiful. On the way home, the woman Young-ho is having an affair with attempts to give him a peppermint candy. Later, Young-ho reluctantly hosts a housewarming party with his family and coworkers. When Hong-ja's prayer before dinner turns into anguished sobbing, Young-ho storms out of the house.

=== Confession: Spring 1987 ===
Young-ho is a police officer, and Hong-ja is pregnant with their daughter. While getting a haircut, he encounters the man he will meet at the restaurant in 1994, apprehends him, and brutally tortures him for information about a suspect's whereabouts. He asks the man if he thinks life is beautiful before letting him go. This leads Young-ho to Gunsan, coincidentally Sun-im's hometown, where he and several other officers wait to apprehend the suspect. That night, Young-ho searches for Sun-im but fails to find her, and ends up sleeping with a woman he meets at a bar. The next morning, the police apprehend and brutally beat the suspect before leaving town, with Young-ho leaving the woman he slept with fruitlessly waiting for him.

=== Prayer: Fall 1984 ===
Young-ho is a rookie in the police force, who is pressured by his colleagues into brutally torturing a suspect. Hong-ja, a restaurant owner, takes an interest in him. One day, Young-ho is visited by Sun-im, who gives him a camera, remarking that he had once expressed an interest in photography to her. He dismisses her by feigning interest in Hong-ja, and returns the camera to Sun-im as she leaves by train. One night, a deranged Young-ho barks military commands at the patrons of Hong-ja's restaurant and wreaks havoc. Afterwards, Young-ho sleeps with Hong-ja, who tries to show him how to recite the Lord's Prayer.

=== Military Visit: May 1980 ===
Sun-im tries and fails to visit Young-ho while he is performing his military service, just as his company is ordered to quell the events occurring in Gwangju. As Young-ho rushes out the barrack, he spills his tin of peppermint candies, and watches as Sun-im walks behind his platoon's vehicle. Young-ho is injured by a stray bullet and is unable to follow his comrades. While waiting for help, a student approaches him, pleading to be allowed to go home despite violating curfew; he initially mistakes her for Sun-im. Just as he is about to let her go, his company returns. He frantically fires warning shots, but accidentally kills the girl. As the other soldiers gather around, he breaks down inconsolably.

=== Picnic: Fall 1979 ===
A group of students, including Young-ho, are visiting a river for a picnic, the same place they will reunite at 20 years later. He meets Sun-im, a factory worker, who gives him a piece of peppermint candy. He expresses a clear interest in photography and her, and remarks that he has seen the location in his dreams, despite having never visited before. While the others play guitar and sing, Young-ho wanders off, lies down on the riverbank, and stares into the distance. A tear falls from his eye, as the sound of a train passing is heard.

== Main cast ==
- Sul Kyung-gu as Kim Young-ho
- Moon So-ri as Yun Sun-im
- Kim Yeo-jin as Hong-ja
- Suh Jung as Miss Lee
- Park Soo-young as Park Factory worker 4
- Park Sung-yeon as Female Factory worker 9

== Analysis ==
The events of Young-ho's life that are shown in the movie can be seen as representing some of the major events of Korea's recent history. The student demonstrations of the early 1980s leading to the Gwangju massacre are shown, as Young-ho becomes traumatized by the shooting incident. The tightening grip on the country by the military government during the 1980s is mirrored by Young-ho losing his innocence and becoming more and more cynical during his stint as a brutal policeman. Similarly, Young-ho losing his job during the late 1990s mirrors the Asian financial crisis.

Young-ho's life represents the struggle between historiography and psychoanalysis. Despite his desperate desire to move on from his past, mnemonic traces overpower the psychoanalytical aspects of his life. These mnemonic traces include the train, the camera, and the peppermint candy as well as Sun-im and her surrogates throughout the vignettes, which led the psychoanalysis of his life to triumph over historiography. The relationship between historiography and psychoanalysis can be seen in historicism and progressivism, where Young-ho chooses to look back on his past instead of looking solely at his future to move forward. The major traumatic events that were historically imposed on him were so embedded in his life that he could not simply move on. However, finally reflecting back on his past allows him to accept what happened and finally advance into the future. Unfortunately, this was moments before he committed suicide when he turned to face the train. The train is the symbol that guides the film in reverse chronology, and his cry to return to the past signifies his tragically late recognition of the past's significance for his life.

Issues of masculinity in South Korean culture arise in the film. Young-ho's masculinity is broken during the Gwangju Massacre scene in which the militarized masculinity enforced by the Korean government — a required 26-month duty in the military, an order to kill innocent civilians, and a need to conform to the standards of the other soldiers around him — ultimately force Young-Ho to compensate later in life by interrogating the student protesters who inevitably were the reason he was put in that situation. This theme continues with the way he treats women later on in his life, objectifying and mistreating his wife Hong-ja and ultimately losing his one link back to his innocence, Sun-im. What results in the beginning of the film, which will be the end of Young-Ho's life, is an ultimate humiliation and a lamentation for a lost innocence where personal history is connected with the history of South Korea.

== Critical reception ==
In 2020, the film was ranked number 12 among the classics of modern South Korean cinema by The Guardian's Peter Bradshaw. The film was rated 86% on Rotten Tomatoes based on the reviews of seven critics.

== Awards and nominations ==
2000 Baeksang Arts Awards

- Best New Actor - Sul Kyung-gu

2000 Grand Bell Awards

- Best Film
- Best Director - Lee Chang-dong
- Best Supporting Actress - Kim Yeo-jin
- Best Screenplay - Lee Chang-dong
- Best New Actor - Sul Kyung-gu

2000 Blue Dragon Film Awards

- Best Actor - Sul Kyung-gu
- Best Screenplay - Lee Chang-dong

35th Karlovy Vary International Film Festival

- Special Jury Prize (tied with The Big Animal)
- Don Quijote Award
- Netpac Award - Special Mention
- Nominated for the Crystal Globe
