= Roman Luknár =

Slovak actor

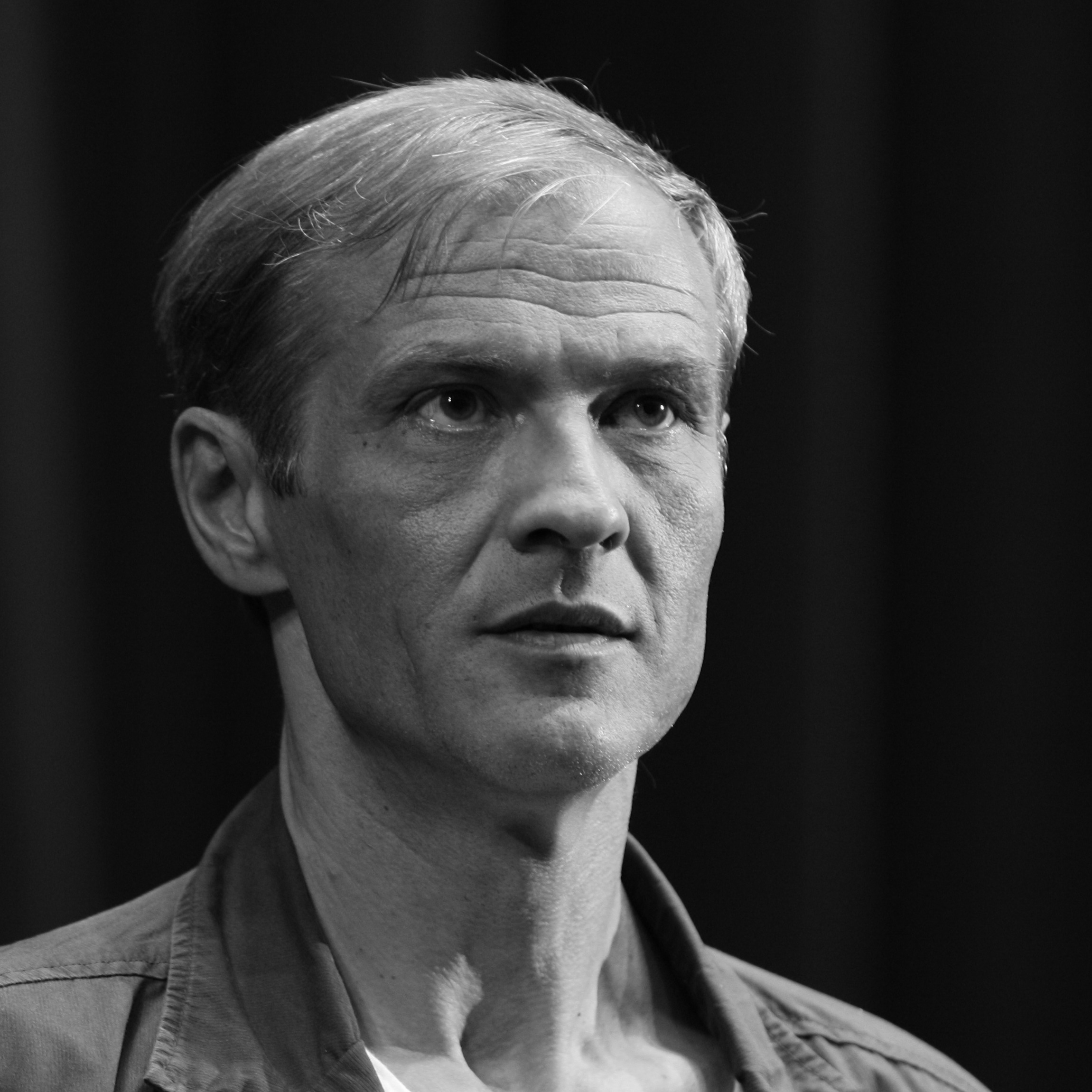
- Born: 1 June 1965 (age 60); Bratislava, Czechoslovakia
- Occupation: Actor
- Years active: 1988-present

Roman Luknár (born 1 June 1965) is a Slovak actor. He appeared in more than fifty films since 1988.

== Selected filmography ==
Year	Title	Role	Notes
1995	The Garden		
2006	Beauty in Trouble		
2008	Shameless		
2009	Soul at Peace	Stefan	Best Supporting Actor at the 2010 Sun in a Net Awards
2011	Lidice		
2013	Candidate		
2013	A Good Day to Die Hard	Anton	
2014	Fair Play		
