= Attila Mokos =

Slovak- born Hungarian actor

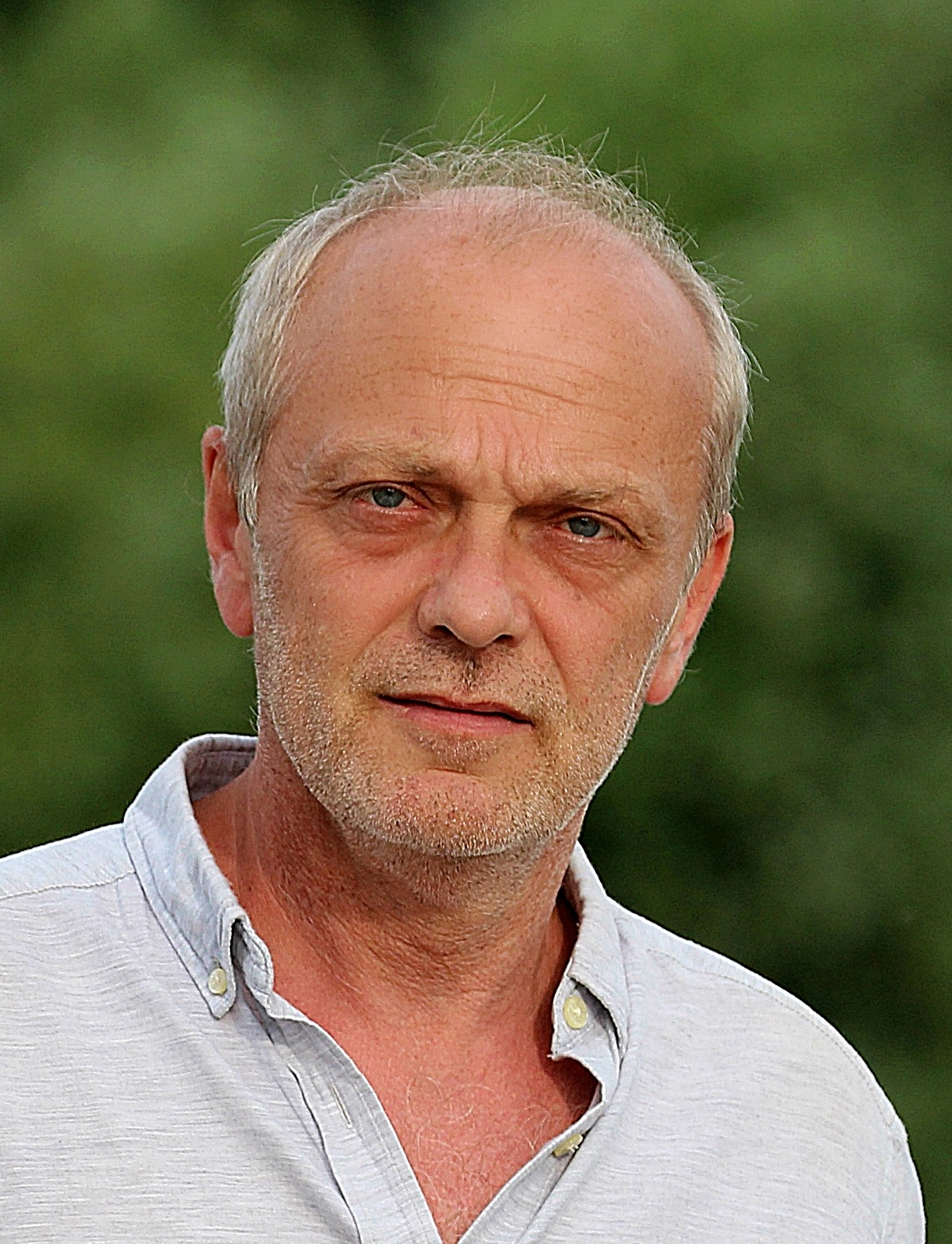
- Attila Mokos
- Born: 13 December 1964 (age 61); Želiezovce, Czechoslovakia
- Occupation: Actor
- Years active: 1980–present

Attila Mokos (born 13 December 1964) is a Slovak actor who holds Hungarian nationality. He is a two-time winner of the Best Actor award at the Sun in a Net Awards, having won it in 2010 for his role in Soul at Peace, and again in 2014 for his role in the 2013 film Fine, Thanks (Ďakujem, dobře).

== Selected filmography ==
- Cruel Joys (2002)
- Broken Promise (2009)
- Soul at Peace (2009)
- Gypsy (2011)
- The House (2011)
- Apricot Island (2011)
- Seven Days of Sin (2012)
- Fine, Thanks (2013)
- Búrlivé víno (television, 2014–2015)
- A Step into the Dark (2014)
- Rex (television, 2017)
- The Interpreter (2018)
- Only Beautiful Things to Look At (2026)
