= Better Go Mad in the Wild =

2025 Czech-Slovak documentary film

- Festival poster
- Czech: Raději zešílet v divočině
- Literally: I'd rather go crazy in the wilderness
- Directed by: Miro Remo
- Screenplay by: Miro Remo, Aleš Palán
- Based on: Raději zešílet v divočině by Aleš Palán
- Produced by: Miro Remo, Tomáš Hrubý
- Starring: František Klišík; Ondřej Klišík
- Cinematography: Dušan Husár; Miro Remo
- Edited by: Šimon Hájek; Máté Csuport
- Music by: Adam Matej
- Production companies: Arsy-Versy; nutprodukce
- Distributed by: 'Aerofilms; Film Expanded
- Release date: 10 July 2025 (KVIFF)
- Running time: 84 minutes
- Countries: Czech Republic; Slovakia
- Language: Czech

Better Go Mad in the Wild (Czech: Raději zešílet v divočině) is a 2025 documentary film co-written and directed by Miro Remo. The film is based on the book of the same name by Czech journalist and writer Aleš Palán, documents the life of identical twin brothers Franta and Ondra, who share everything in the Sumava Mountains.

The film, a Czech Republic and Slovak Republic co-production premiered at 59th Karlovy Vary International Film Festival on 10 July 2025. It won Crystal Globe in the main competition.

== Cast ==
- František Klišík
- Ondrej Klisik

== Production ==
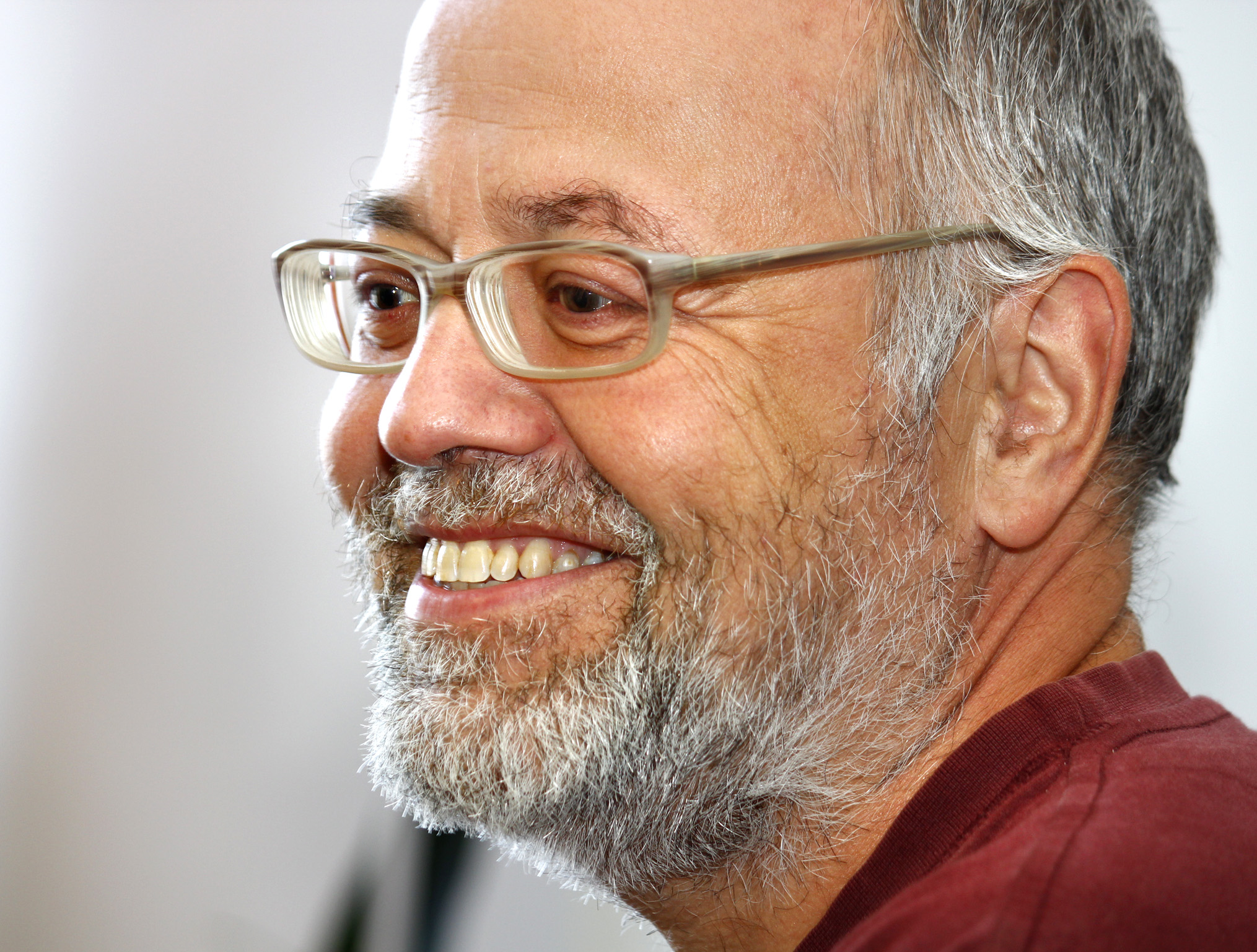
Aleš Palán, Czech journalist, publicist and writer, co-writer of the film

The film is based on one of the stories in the book of the same name by Aleš Palán. The book includes several stories about the Šumava hermits. One of them was about the cast of the film: Franta Klišík and Ondra Klišík. In an interview to Variety, Miro Remo, the director of the film, said,

"We spent 60 days with the brothers over the course of five years, and I began to feel their animals were communicating with us as well. The biggest advantage was that anything was possible on that project. We only needed to overcome our fear of conventions."

The film was produced by Remo and Tomáš Hrubý for Arsy-Versy, Dušan Husár with Remo shot the film.

== Release ==
Better Go Mad in the Wild had its premiere at 59th Karlovy Vary International Film Festival on 10 July 2025, where it won the Crystal Globe competing with other eleven feature films.

It was presented in the 'Mission Life - 2025' section of the 56th International Film Festival of India in November 2025.

== Reception ==
Marko Stojiljković, reviewing the film at the Karlovy Vary International Film Festival for Cineuropa, wrote that it has an open-ended narrative and unconventional storytelling. He further opined that it presents an extraordinary life experience that challenges viewers’ expectations, provoking diverse reactions ranging from intrigue to exasperation. Stojiljković commended Miro Remo and Dušan Husár for their cinematography, and highlighted Maté Csuport’s editing for establishing a rhythmic portrayal of the protagonists’ lives. However, he found Adam Matej’s classical-influenced score overly blunt, noting it failed to cohesively bridge the film’s narrative transitions. Concluding the review he observed, "... but it certainly makes for a unique film."

Guy Lodge, reviewing the film for Variety, wrote that it is a poetic and an eccentric documentary. He opined that adapted in part from Aleš Palán’s book, the film employs lyrical narration and observational footage to explore the philosophical reflections and intense interpersonal dynamic of the protagonist duo. Lodge noted that the documentary presents an intimate and contemplative portrait of unconventional rural life through rich cinematography and a whimsical tone.

Phil Hoad, reviewing the film for The Guardian, described it as a surreal documentary combining humour, philosophical reflection and poetry. He highlighted the film's portrayal of the Klišík brothers' isolated life in the Šumava mountains, their complicated relationship and their connection with nature. Hoad praised Remo's approach to the brothers' story and the film's exploration of family, nature, interdependency and love, concluding that it is "rowdy, rapturous and brilliant".

=== Accolades ===
Year	Award	Category	Recipient(s)	Result	Ref
2025	Karlovy Vary International Film Festival	Crystal Globe Grand Prix	Better Go Mad in the Wild	Won	
2025	Czech Lion Awards	Best Documentary	Better Go Mad in the Wild	Won	
2025	Czech Lion Awards	Best Cinematography	Dušan Husár, Miro Remo	Won	
2025	Czech Lion Awards	Best Editing	Máté Csuport, Šimon Hájek	Won	
2025	Czech Lion Awards	Best Sound	Lukáš Kasprzyk, Adam Matej	Nominated	
2025	Sun in a Net Awards	Best Documentary	Better Go Mad in the Wild	Won	
