= Free Fall (2014 Hungarian film) =

- Directed by: György Pálfi
- Starring: Piroska Molnár; Miklós Benedek
- Release date: 3 May 2014 (JIFF)
- Running time: 100 minutes
- Country: Hungary
- Language: Hungarian

Free Fall (Hungarian: Szabadesés) is a 2014 Hungarian comedy-drama surreal film directed by György Pálfi.

== Cast ==
- Piroska Molnár as Auntie
- Miklós Benedek as Uncle
- Tamás Jordán as Master
- Ferenc Lakos as Student
- Linda Rubesch as Bill
- Gabrielle Jourdan as Student
- Lilla Gogolák as Student
- Krisztina Jankovics as Student
- Edit Kocsisné Birkás as Student
- Géza Kiss as Student
- Marina Gera as the naked woman at the party
- Csaba Gosztonyi as Husband
- Csaba Györy as Uncle Laci
- Dániel Csengery as Choir leader

== Production ==
Marina Gera explained that when she talked with György Pálfi on the phone, the director was in no hurry to tell her why the role would be difficult. "Only at the end did he tell me that it's time for the bad news: you have to play it completely naked. But I really liked the idea, I thought it was really nice. And I said, 'Yeah, sure.'"

== Awards ==
The film won the Special Jury Prize at the 49th Karlovy Vary International Film Festival, where Pálfi also won the Best Director Award.
