= All Yours (2014 film) =

- French: Je suis à toi
- Directed by: David Lambert
- Written by: David Lambert
- Produced by: Jean-Yves Roubin; Daniel Morin
- Starring: Nahuel Pérez Biscayart; Jean-Michel Balthazar; Monia Chokri
- Cinematography: Johan Legraie
- Edited by: Hélène Girard
- Music by: Ramachandra Borcar
- Production companies: Frakas Productions; Boréal Films
- Release date: 5 July 2014 (KVIFF)
- Running time: 102 minutes
- Countries: Belgium; Canada
- Languages: French; English; Spanish

All Yours (French: Je suis à toi) is a comedy drama film, directed by David Lambert and released in 2014. The film stars Nahuel Pérez Biscayart as Lucas, a hustler from Argentina who moves to Belgium in a gay version of a mail-order bride arrangement at the behest of Belgian baker Henry (Jean-Michel Balthazar), but in reality is a heterosexual gay-for-pay worker who instead begins to fall for Henry's employee Audrey (Monia Chokri).

The cast also includes Augustin Legrand, Vittoria Scognamiglio, Achille Ridolfi, Anne-Marie Loop, Jean-Michel Charlier, Michel Adam, Philippe Burette, Karim Ait Ahmed, Alex Schelstraete, Axel Cornil, Benjamin Boutboul, Jean-Sebastien Biche, Jeremy Bridoux, Caroline Dujardin and Benjamin Landenne.

The film was a Belgian-Canadian coproduction. It debuted in competition at the 49th Karlovy Vary International Film Festival, where Pérez Biscayart won the award for Best Actor.
