= Gypsy (2011 film) =

2011 film

- Film poster
- Directed by: Martin Šulík
- Written by: Marek Lescák; Martin Šulík
- Produced by: Rudolf Biermann; Martin Šulík
- Starring: Miroslav Gulyas
- Cinematography: Martin Sec
- Edited by: Jiří Brožek
- Music by: Vladimír Godár
- Release date: 5 July 2011
- Running time: 100 minutes
- Countries: Slovakia; Czech Republic
- Language: Romani

Gypsy (Slovak: Cigán) is a 2011 Slovak-Czech drama film directed by Martin Šulík. The film was selected as the Slovak entry for the Best Foreign Language Film at the 84th Academy Awards, but it did not make the final shortlist.

== Plot summary ==
Gypsy tells the story of Adam, a boy who, after his father dies, tries to cross the boundary of his Romani shantytown and to improve the lives of his brothers and sisters. He encounters racial, social, and cultural prejudices and comes into conflict with the unwritten laws of his own community. Circumstances turn against him and his situation drives him to commit a tragic act: murder.

== Cast ==
- Miroslav Gulyas as Uncle
- Martina Kotlarova as Julka
- Jan Mizigar as Adam
- Attila Mokos as Priest

== Releases, awards and nominations ==
In July 2011, the film was first released at the 46th Karlovy Vary International Film Festival, where it was nominated for the Crystal Globe, it won the Special Jury Prize, the Don Quijote Award, the Label Europa Cinemas award, and Jan Mizigar received a Special Mention for his role in the film. Thereafter it won 6 more awards and 9 nominations in various international film festivals.

== See also ==
- List of submissions to the 84th Academy Awards for Best Foreign Language Film
- List of Slovak submissions for the Academy Award for Best Foreign Language Film
