= Nový život =

Slovak teen drama television series

- Genre: Teen drama
- Screenplay by: Petr Kolečko; Danica Hričová; Alena Sabuchová; Vanda Feriancovia; Martina Svobodová; Jozef Koleják
- Directed by: Ján Novák
- Starring: Alexander Bárta; Helena Krajčiová; Milo Král; Maximilián Bolf; Thomas Kamenar; Henrienta Mičkovicová; Alžbeta Stanková; Jozef Vajda; Hana Gajdošová-Letková; Ivan Krúpa; Simona Kollárová; Barbora Švidraňová; Michal Spielmann; Lucia Vráblicová; Romana Dang Van; Lucia Hurajová; Juraj Loj; Lucia Hurajová; Tomáš Vravnik
- Theme music composer: Petr Kolečko; Roland Kubina
- Opening theme: "To si nedám len tak vziať" by Marian Čekovsky
- Composer: Vlado Krausz
- Country of origin: Slovakia
- Original language: Slovak
- No. of seasons: 4
- No. of episodes: 129 (list of episodes)

Production
- Executive producer: Pavol Polner
- Producers: Petr Kolečko (creative producer); Danica Hričová (creative producer); Sláva Adamíková; Roland Kubina
- Cinematography: Peter Bencsik; Matej Somrak
- Running time: 42–52 minutes

Original release
- Network: TV JOJ
- Release: January 6, 2020 – June 22, 2021

Nový život (English: New Life) is a Slovak prime time teen drama television series produced by Petr Kolečko, Danica Hričová, Sláva Adamíková, Roland Kubina, the former two credited as creative producers while also Kubina assisted Kolečko on composing theme music and directed by Ján Novák. The story tells about three forty-year-olds and best friends, hockey player Dušan and football players Pavol and Lucia, decide to abandon their sporting career. The trio then start their new life. Most scenes centers around the lives of high school pupils, Lea, Tomáš, Miro and teachers in Trenčín secondary school. The principal casts are Alexander Bárta, Helena Krajčiová, Milo Král, Maximilián Bolf, Henrieta Mičkovicová, Alžbeta Stanková, Jozef Vajda, Ivan Krúpa, Simona Kollárová and Barbora Švidraňová.

Nový život gained average performance of 7–8 ratings in a commercial target with a total of 420–460 thousand viewers. In CŠFD, the series gained mixed reviews.

Started airing from January 6, 2020, Nový život achieved favorable rates with 552,000 viewers over the age of 12 and voted 11.8 percent among the age range. The Christmas special program was aired on Thursday December 17, 2020 at 21:30. It broadcast on TV JOJ on 20:35 UTC (3:35 a.m, CET).

The third season downplayed viewers attraction to 5%, concerning the fate of characters. As a result, the series urged to conclude on June 22, 2021.

== Synopsis ==
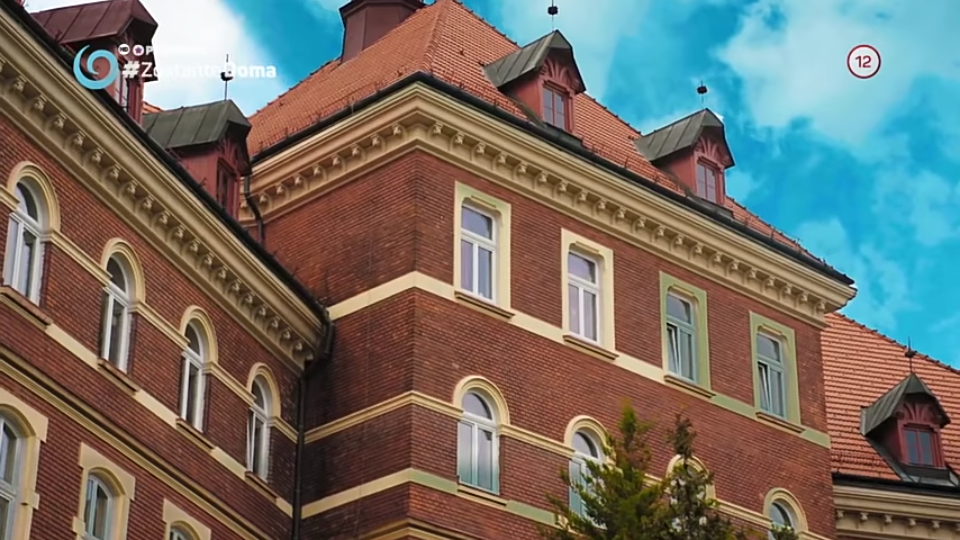
Screenshot of Nový život featuring Trenčin school building. Most of setting centers around the lives of teen high school pupils, teachers, and staffs of the school.

Three forty-year-olds friends, hockey player Dušan and football players Pavol and Lucia, decide to abandon their sporting career. The trio then begin a new life. The majority scenes screens at Trenčín secondary school of the lives of high school pupils, such as Lea, Tomáš, Miro and other students, about romantic relationship and they may also encounter several challenges. Lea loves Miro as he disliked her and begins with Danica, her close classmate. Tomáš and his girlfriend Vanesa has a long history relationship despite Tomáš annoyed by Vanesa, a villain character, involved in petty theft in the school and reportedly accused by teachers and staff members. Tomáš' ex-girlfriend and classmate Martina is the daughter of Fedor, apparently linked bloodline to Alena's family, which remains secret for both siblings and preserved by Fedor. For Martina, it is questionable so because distortion of her past family history and abandonment.

From the main characters, Lucia, Dušan and Pavol, the latter two employed in the school and become teachers, while Lucia has been Pavol's partner, which she becomes pregnant with him at the first episode.

== Cast and characters ==
- Helena Krajčiová as Lucia Pálfyová – former football player and owner of the Fatima pub. She is partner of Pavol.
- Alexander Bárta as Pavol "Paľo" Cvikla – a former football player. He engaged with Lucia in the later.
- Milo Král as Dušan Molnár – former hockey player and schoolteacher at the 8-year grammar school in Trenčín. He is the father of Tomáš.
- Thomas Kamenar as Evald – manager of the women's football club in Petržalka and Lucia's husband from Austria.
- Simona Kollárová as Lea Cviklová – Pavol and Vanda's daughter. Lea engaged with her classmate Miro, but he entangled with her close classmate Danica in the first season.
- Henrieta Mičkovicova as Vanda – Pavol ex-wife and mother of Lea.
- Maximilián Bolf as Tomáš Molnár – Dušan and Alena's son.
- Alžbeta Stanková as Alena Molnárová – editor and Dušan's wife.
- Juraj Loj as Juraj "Loho" Lohinský – boxer and former classmate of the main characters. He fall in love with schoolteacher Helena.
- Jozef Vajda as Fedor Ďuriš – Dušan's father-in-law and Alena's father.
- Hana Gajdošová Letková as Stela Ďurišová – Dušan's mother-in-law, Fedor's wife and Alena's mother.
- Ivan Lrúpa as Majerík – teacher and director of an 8-year grammar school in Trenčín.
- Barbora Švidraňová as Helena Medvecká – Slovak language teacher. She apparently seduce with Pavol with vain effort.
- Ján Jackuliak as Boris Baláž – gymnast.
- Lucia Vráblicová as Gitka – a schoolteacher at Trenčin school associated with Majerík.
- Lucia Hurajová as Darina Bakošová – a doctor at the school.
- Romana Dang Van as Danica Nguyen –Lea's best friend and later Miro's girlfriend.
- Laura Petersen as Martina Litvajová –Fedor's illegitimate daughter, Alena's sister and Tomáš's classmate, and ex-girlfriend.
- Tomáš Vravnik as Ondrej Žamboch –journalist.
- Sagvan Tofi as Derek Tofi – Vanda's partner, owner of the Šmelina car bazaar.
- Marko Damien as Marko Roberts – English teacher, subtenant of Vanda, Evald and Lea.
- Tony Porucha as Miro Rosputinsky – Lea classmate and ex-boyfriend, later he loves Danica.
- Michal Spielmann as Andrej Lančarič –a classmate who apparently engaged with Danica since the second season.
- Eva Máziková as Mutti – Evald's mother and lover of deer.
- Laura Kronauerova as Vanesa – Tomáš girlfriend and a classmate, a villain character.
- Ján Dobrik as the former football player Rudo Kapusta, who in the meantime ended up in the base and will help Pavol and Evald put a team from the 5th football league FK Ilava on its feet (2nd season).
- Róbert Jakab as Dragan – fitness trainer from Bosnia (2nd season).

== Series overview ==
Season	Episodes	Originally aired		Timeslot (CET)	Network
Season	Episodes	First aired	Last aired	Timeslot (CET)	Network
1	40	January 6, 2020	April 22, 2020	Monday 20:35 (1–2); Tuesday to Thursday 20:35 (3– 34); Wednesday 20:35 (35– 40)	TV JOJ
2	40	September 1, 2020	December 15, 2020	Tuesday and Thursday 20:35	TV JOJ
Christmas special	December 17, 2020			Thursday 21:30	TV JOJ
3	48	January 19, 2021	June 22, 2021	Tuesday and Thursday 20:35 (1–22) Tuesday 20:35 (23–48)	TV JOJ
