= Wrong Side Up =

2005 Czech comedy-drama film

- Directed by: Petr Zelenka
- Written by: Petr Zelenka
- Starring: Ivan Trojan; Zuzana Šulajová; Miroslav Krobot; Nina Divíšková; Jiří Bartoška
- Release date: 24 February 2005
- Running time: 100 minutes
- Country: Czech Republic
- Language: Czech

Wrong Side Up (Czech: Příběhy obyčejného šílenství) is a 2005 Czech comedy-drama film written and directed by Petr Zelenka. It is an adaptation of Zelenka's play Tales of Common Insanity. It is a tale of people showing their internal loneliness by their choices in life. It was entered into the 27th Moscow International Film Festival.

== Plot ==
A former aircrew member (Petr) is no longer flying, but works in an aviation-related dead-end job, loading boxes at an air-cargo company. He spends his working hours dreaming of re-winning the hand of his former fiancée (Jana), who has moved on to another man whose prospects seem better. He spends his off hours surreptitiously observing a female neighbor.

His parents also face personal problems: his mother has involved herself in causes promoting world peace but ignores her collapsing family; his father is fighting a midlife crisis by trying to pursue an extramarital affair with a colleague.

== Cast ==
- Ivan Trojan as Petr
- Zuzana Šulajová as Jana
- Zuzana Stivínová as Jana (voice)
- Miroslav Krobot as Otec
- Nina Divíšková as Matka
- Karel Heřmánek as Šéf
- Petra Lustigová as Sylvie
- Jiří Bartoška as Jiří
- Zuzana Bydžovská as Alice
- Jana Hubinská as Teta
- Jiří Bábek as Aleš
- Marta Sládečková as Šefova žena
- Jan Lepšík as Kolega
- Matúš Bukovčan as Kolega
- Petr Lafek as Martin
- Peter Dubecký as Číšník
- Ida Sovová as Servírka
- Václav Strasser as Dublinář

== Awards ==
- 2005 Czech Lion Awards: Best sound
- 2005 Czech Lion Awards: Best supporting actor, Miroslav Krobot
- 2006, Bronza Rosa Camuna: Best director, Bergamo Film Meeting
