= Czech Lion Award for Best Cinematography =

Czech film award

- Country: Czech Republic
- First award: 1993
- Currently held by: Dušan Husár, Miro Remo
- Website: https://www.filmovaakademie.cz

Czech Lion Award for Best Cinematography is award given to the Czech film with best Cinematography.

== Winners ==
Year	English Name	Original Name	Cinematographer
1993	Horror Story	Krvavý román	Jaroslav Brabec
1994	The Ride	Jízda	F. A. Brabec
1995	The Golet in the Valley	Golet v údolí	Juraj Šajmovičc
1996	King Ubu	Král Ubu	F. A. Brabec
1997	Lea	Lea	Vladimír Smutný
1998	Sekal Has to Die	Je třeba zabít Sekala	Martin Štrba
1999	The Melancholic Chicken	Kuře melancholik	Jiří Macák, Jaroslav Brabec, Martin Čech
2000	Wild Flowers	Kytice	F. A. Brabec
2001	Dark Blue World	Tmavomodrý svět	Vladimír Smutný
2002	Angelic Face	Andělská tvář	Jaroslav Brabec
2003	Smart Philip	Mazaný Filip	Vladimír Smutný
2004	King of Thieves	Král zlodějů	Vladimír Smutný
2005	Something Like Happiness	Štěstí	Diviš Marek
2006	I Served the King of England	Obsluhoval jsem anglického krále	Jaromír Šofr
2007	Little Girl Blue	Tajnosti	Ramunas Greičius
2008	Tobruk	Tobruk	Vladimír Smutný
2009	3 Seasons in Hell	3 sezóny v pekle	Karl Oskarsson
2010	Walking Too Fast	Pouta	Jaromír Kačer
2011	Flower Buds	Poupata	Vladimír Smutný
2012	In the Shadow	Ve stínu	Adam Sikora
2013	Burning Bush	Hořící keř	Martin Štrba
2014	The Way Out	Cesta ven	Štěpán Kučera
2015	The Snake Brothers	Kobry a užovky	Petr Koblovský
2016	A Prominent Patient	Masaryk	Martin Štrba
2017	Barefoot	Po strništi bos	Vladimír Smutný
2018	Hastrman	Hastrman	Marek Diviš
2019	The Painted Bird	Nabarvené ptáče	Vladimír Smutný
2020	Charlatan	Šarlatán	Martin Štrba
2021	Zátopek	Zátopek	Štěpán Kučera
2022	The Last Race	Poslední závod	Jan Baset Střítežský
2023	Restore Point	Bod obnovy	Filip Marek
2024	Girl America	Amerikánka	Martin Douba
2025	Better Go Mad in the Wild	Raději zešílet v divočině	Dušan Husár, Miro Remo
