= Hen (film) =

- Promotional poster
- Greek: Κότα
- Directed by: György Pálfi
- Screenplay by: György Pálfi; Zsófia Ruttkay
- Produced by: Thanassis Karathanos; Martin Hampel; Costas Lambropoulos; Giorgos Kiriakos
- Starring: Yannis Kokiasmenos; Maria Diakopanayotou; Argyris Pandazaras
- Cinematography: Giorgos Karvelas
- Edited by: Lehmhényi Réka
- Music by: Szabolcs Szoke
- Production companies: Pallas Film; View Master Films; Twenty Twenty Vision
- Release date: 8 September 2025 (TIFF)
- Running time: 98 minutes
- Countries: Hungary; Germany; Greece
- Language: Greek
- Box office: $1 million

Hen (Greek: Κότα) is a 2025 Greek-language drama film, co-written and directed by György Pálfi. A co-production of companies from Germany, Greece and Hungary, the film follows a Leghorn chicken who escapes from an industrial farm and wanders until finding a new home in the chicken coop of a small family-owned restaurant tied to a human smuggling ring.

The cast includes the hens Eszti, Szandi, Feri, Enci, Eti, Eniko, Nora, and Annet in the lead role, as well as nine humans in supporting roles (Yannis Kokiasmenos, Maria Diakopanayotou, Argyris Pandazaras, Machmout Bamerni, Chronis Barbarian, Antonis Kafetzopoulos, Nikos Kattis, Dimitris Pelekis and Antonis Tsiotsiopoulos).

The film premiered in the Platform Prize competition at the 2025 Toronto International Film Festival, where it received an honorable mention.

== Release ==
The film competed in the 'Progressive Cinema Competition - Visions for the World of Tomorrow' section of the 20th Rome Film Festival in October 2025, and at the 38th Tokyo International Film Festival on October 29, 2025, in International competition.

== Reception ==
On the review aggregator website Rotten Tomatoes, 100% of 32 critics' reviews are positive, with an average rating of 7.9/10. Metacritic, which uses a weighted average, assigned the film a score of 83 out of 100, based on seven critics, indicating "generally favorable" reviews.
