= The Interpreter (2018 film) =

2018 film

- Promotional release poster
- Directed by: Martin Šulík
- Written by: Marek Lescák; Martin Šulík
- Produced by: Rudolf Biermann; Martin Šulík; Bruno Wagner
- Starring: Jiří Menzel; Peter Simonischek
- Cinematography: Martin Štrba
- Edited by: Olga Kaufmanová
- Music by: Vladimír Godár
- Distributed by: Garfield Film
- Release dates: 23 February 2018 (Berlin); 1 March 2018 (Slovakia)
- Running time: 113 minutes
- Countries: Slovakia; Czech Republic; Austria
- Language: Slovak
- Budget: $110,433

The Interpreter (Slovak: Tlmočník) is a 2018 road comedy-drama film directed by Martin Šulík who co-wrote with Marek Lescák. It was selected as the Slovak entry for the Best Foreign Language Film at the 91st Academy Awards, but it was not nominated. It is a co-production between Slovakia, the Czech Republic and Austria.

== Plot ==
In Vienna, retiree Georg meets an interpreter named Ali. The two men embark on a journey across Slovakia, encountering wartime survivors who will hopefully lead them to the Nazi officer that killed Ali's parents.

A retired Slovak interpreter, Ali Ungár, reads the memoirs of an Austrian officer, and comes to believe he killed his parents during World War II. He travels to Vienna to visit him, taking with him a gun. The door of his flat is opened by Georg Graubner, who says that his father killed a lot of people during the war but is now himself dead. He asks if Ali is Jewish, and Ali asks if that matters. Reluctant to leave with no resolution, Ali asks to use the toilet and have a drink of water, and finally denounces Georg as a Nazi swine. As he leaves the building he pushes the biography through the letterbox and scratches a swastika on the outside.

Intrigued by the book, Georg aks Ali to meet him, and when they do this he suggests they tour the places mentioned in the book to research his father's history. Ali agrees, on condition he is paid €100 a day and has his own room to sleep in.

They tour Slovakia, equipped with old photographs showing Georg's father. Their first port of call is Banská Bystrica, where Georg's car is broken into and all his papers and money stolen. Ali has to pay the hotel bill and for Georg's drinks, and resigns from the job. However Georg persuades him to stay on. The men develop a kind of friendship. It transpires that Ali survived the war because his parents gave him away and had him baptised.

They visit a farm, where Ali discovers that it was not German but Slovak Nazis who killed his family. He collapses and Georg takes him to hospital, where his daughter comes to look after him. Georg then drives back to Vienna, where it is revealed that his own father is not dead, but is a bed-ridden invalid. Georg props him up in bed, shows him video testimonies of victims of the German occupation, and then leaves a gun by his side.

== Cast ==
- Jiří Menzel as Ali Ungár
- Peter Simonischek as Georg Graubner
- Zuzana Mauréry as Edita
- Attila Mokos as Kysel Junior
- Anna Rakovska as Truda

== See also ==
- List of submissions to the 91st Academy Awards for Best Foreign Language Film
- List of Slovak submissions for the Academy Award for Best Foreign Language Film
