= Corn Island (film) =

2014 film

- Film poster
- Directed by: Giorgi Ovashvili
- Written by: Giorgi Ovashvili, Roelof Jan Minneboo, Nugzar Shataidze
- Produced by: Guillaume de Seille, Nino Devdariani, Sain Gabdullin, Eike Goreczka, Christoph Kukula, George Ovashvili, Karla Stojáková
- Starring: İlyas Salman
- Cinematography: Elemér Ragályi
- Edited by: Sun-min Kim
- Music by: Ioseb Bardanashvili
- Release dates: 9 July 2014 (Karlovy); 17 September 2014 (Georgia)
- Running time: 100 minutes
- Countries: Georgia; Germany; France; Czech Republic; Kazakhstan
- Languages: Abkhaz; Georgian; Russian

Corn Island (Georgian: სიმინდის კუნძული, romanized: simindis k'undzuli) is a 2014 drama film, directed by Giorgi Ovashvili, following an entire summer during which a grandfather and granddaughter attempt to harvest a crop of corn grown atop a silt island in the Enguri River amidst tensions involving military conflict, ethnic differences and the sexual awakening of the granddaughter. The film featured both Georgian and Abkhaz spoken languages, while a version was released that also included English language subtitles.

== Plot ==
Spring flooding forms a small silt island with rich soil in the middle of the Enguri River, which provides new land without an owner. An old man, assisted by his orphaned teenage granddaughter, takes possession of the island, builds a simple hut, and plants corn. While his granddaughter finishes school, the old man is disappointed that she won't receive her diploma until the following year, an event which he hopes to see since he takes pride in her education. The old man and his granddaughter are ethnic Abkhazians and exchange nods with passing Georgian soldiers. Unfortunately for the granddaughter, who is just experiencing sexual maturity for the first time, the soldiers make noises at her and ogle her as they stand on the shore across from her, something that she is both curious about and also resents, finding it somewhat annoying. One night, while swimming in the river, a shotgun noise startles the granddaughter and she falls into the water, nearly drowning before rescuing herself and hurrying back to the hut.

The next morning, the old man discovers and shelters a wounded soldier who takes refuge on the island. He protects him from his pursuers for a time, but after a flirtatious encounter with the granddaughter and a near-death experience with the Georgian soldiers, who rudely assert themselves on the island and drink all of the old man's wine, the wounded soldier leaves. He is later revealed to be Russian when his comrades arrive at the island looking for him, although the old man turns them away. At the end of the summer, flooding begins to pull apart the island, taking some of the corn stalks that the old man and his granddaughter had hoped to harvest. They fill their single boat with as many ears of corn as will fit, but this leaves no room for the old man, who shoves the boat into the churning water before the granddaughter can stop it and pull her grandfather to safety. He clings to his hut as the boat floats away, hoping to wait out the worst of the storm as the island is disintegrated. Unfortunately for him, the hut collapses over him and he drowns in the heavy undercurrent.

The ending of the film shows a new man arriving on the remains of what was once the old man's corn island next spring. The new man digs in the silt to check the quality of the soil, only to discover a ragdoll, which had belonged to the old man's granddaughter, buried there from the prior year. He washes off the doll and perches it in his own boat as he sits alone beside it, starting the island's tradition anew.

== Cast ==
- İlyas Salman as Old Man
- Mariam Buturishvili as Girl

== Production ==
The film was shot throughout 70 days in April–May 2013 and September–November 2013.

Mariam Buturishvili said the biggest difficulty for her during filming was the scene where she takes a dip in the river naked. "During the shooting of the last shots, in the beginning of November, I had to dive into the water. It was very cold. I was freezing, I knew," she said.

== Releases, awards and nominations ==
The film was first released at the 49th Karlovy Vary International Film Festival in July 2014, where it won the Crystal Globe, as well as the Prize of the Ecumenical Jury.

It was also selected as the Georgian entry for consideration for the Best Foreign Language Film at the 87th Academy Awards, making the January Shortlist.

== See also ==
- List of submissions to the 87th Academy Awards for Best Foreign Language Film
- List of Georgian submissions for the Academy Award for Best Foreign Language Film
