= The Garden (1995 film) =

The Garden (Záhrada)
- Directed by: Martin Šulík
- Written by: Marek Leščák; Ondrej Šulaj; Martin Šulík
- Starring: Marián Labuda; Roman Luknár; Zuzana Šulajová; Jana Švandová; Katarína Vrzalová
- Cinematography: Martin Štrba
- Music by: Vladimír Godár
- Distributed by: Action Gitanes
- Release date: 15 June 1995
- Running time: 99 minutes
- Countries: Slovakia; France; Czech Republic
- Language: Slovak

The Garden (Slovak: Záhrada) is a 1995 Slovak feature film in cooperation with French Artcam International and Czech InFilm Praha directed by Martin Šulík. The film is a poetic tale of Jakub, a man in his early 30s. It reflects the relationships and desires of Jakub in the idyllic surroundings of his grandfather's garden. The Garden is one of the most recognised films of post communist Slovakia. It is especially popular in Slovakia and the Czech Republic. It won the Special Jury Prize at the 40th Karlovy Vary International Film Festival in 1995, and several Czech Lions in 1996.

The film was selected as the Slovak entry for the Best Foreign Language Film at the 68th Academy Awards, but was not accepted as a nominee.

== Plot ==
Jakub is a daydreamer in his early 30s and still lives with his father. The father is tired of Jakub's idleness and throws him out of the flat. He tells Jakub to sell the old garden of his grandfather and to buy his own flat. Jakub retires into the neglected garden and retreats into the worn garden house from the world and from his problems. The garden turns out to be a magical place full of surprises and mysteries. Jakub stumbles across his grandfather's journal which is written in reverse script. He finds a map leading him to an old bottle of slivovice hidden years ago. Now curious Jakub must solve the mysteries of his grandfather's garden. He meets Helena, a young girl Jakub's grandfather taught to also write backwards. Strange things happen in the garden, and some of them do indeed seem like miracles. Amid the eccentric events, young Helena teaches Jakub to appreciate the delicate mysteries of life. In the end Jakub loses all his possessions but finds his peace.

== Cast ==
Actor	Role
Marián Labuda	Jakub's father
Roman Luknár	Jakub
Zuzana Šulajová	Helena
Jana Švandová	Tereza
Katarína Vrzalová	Helena's mother

== See also ==
- List of submissions to the 68th Academy Awards for Best Foreign Language Film
- List of Slovak submissions for the Academy Award for Best Foreign Language Film
