= Zuzana Šulajová =

Slovak stage, television and film actress

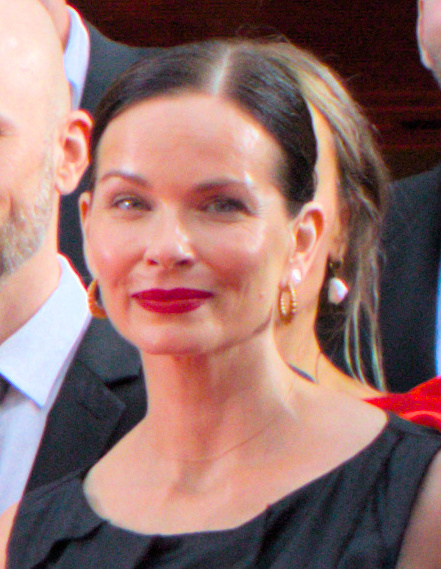
- Zuzana Šulajová in 2025
- Born: 14 July 1978 (age 47); Martin, Czechoslovakia
- Occupation: Actress
- Years active: 1990–present

Zuzana Šulajová (or Zuzana Šulaj, pronunciation: shoo-lah-yo-vah) (born 14 July 1978, Martin, Czechoslovakia) is a Slovak stage, television and film actress.

== Biography ==
Zuzana Šulajová is a daughter of writer and pedagogue Ondřej Šulaj and actress Anna Šulajová. She is a photographer and actress. She studied Photography at the Academy of Art and Industrial Design (UMPRUM) in Prague. Her sister Katarína Šulajová is a director.

== Filmography ==
- Broken Voices / Sbormistr, (2025)
- Wrong Side Up / Příběhy obyčejného šílenštví (2005) .... Jana
- O dve slabiky pozadu (2004) .... Zuzana
- Zpráva o putování studentů Petra a Jakuba (2000) .... Eva
- Powers (2000)
- The Garden (1995) .... Helena - Czech Lion award - nomination
- Tichá radosť (1985) .... Katka Galová

== Videoclips and commercials ==
- Hex by Juraj Černý (1995)
- Support Lesbiens (2004)
- Eurotel Easy (2002) directed by Vlado Struhár
- Kofola Citrus (2004) directed by Michal Baumbrucken
