= Restoration (2011 film) =

Restoration בוקר טוב אדון פידלמן
- Theatrical release poster
- Directed by: Yossi Madmoni
- Written by: Erez Kav-El
- Starring: Sasson Gabai; Sarah Adler; Henry David; Nevo Kimchi; Rami Danon
- Release date: 2011
- Country: Israel
- Language: Hebrew

Restoration (Hebrew: בוקר טוב אדון פידלמן, lit. 'Good Morning, Mr. Fiedelman') is a 2011 Israeli drama film directed by Yossi Madmoni and written by Erez Kav-El.

== Plot ==
The film concerns a small furniture-restoration business in downtown Tel Aviv, Malamud & Fidelman. As the film begins, one of the partners (Malamud, played by Rami Danon) has died, and bequeathed his share in the business not to his longtime partner Yaakov Fidelman (Sasson Gabai), but to Yaakov's son Noah Fidelman (Nevo Kimchi).

The aging Yaakov is a skilled craftsman, who loves his work and keeps exacting standards. However, he has little sense for financial issues, which had always been taken care of by his dead partner, Max Malamud. The business is going down, demand for Yaakov's services is falling off and banks refuse to give him loans. Noah, who had refused to follow in his father's footsteps and became a successful lawyer, is pressing Yaakov to retire and sell off the workshop – which could bring a lucrative profit as the area is undergoing a real-estate boom.

Shortly before Max died, a mysterious young man named Anton (Henry David) gets a job in the workshop, and becomes Yaakov's helper and apprentice. Little is revealed of Anton's antecedents; he had broken off relations with his family, for unknown reasons, and hides when his brother comes by seeking him. Anton comes up with a way of saving the failing business, or at least giving it a breathing spell: a broken-down 19th Century German Steinway piano, which Anton discovered among old junk in the workshop, can possibly be repaired and sold for a considerable sum.

Anton – who is also a gifted pianist – throws himself into the repair job, so determined to succeed that he resorts to stealing in order to gain money needed to pay for an expensive part. In effect, he stakes a claim to continuing the old man's lifework which Noah wants no part of. As work on the piano progresses, the frustrated Noah steals into the workshop, but cannot bring himself to smash the piano.

The stakes in this rivalry are raised higher when Anton develops romantic feelings for Noah's wife, Hava (Sarah Adler) – a sensitive and artistic young woman who is neglected by her busy husband, and who is heavily pregnant with Noah's child, Yaakov's grandchild.

Eventually, it is Yaakov Fidelman who must make the crucial choice between Anton's piano project and Noah's real-estate deal – and to choose which of them he sees carrying on his legacy.

== Reception ==
At the 2011 Jerusalem Film Festival, Restoration won the Haggiag Family Award for Best Full-Length Feature Film.

At the 46th Karlovy Vary International Film Festival, the film won the 2011 Crystal Globe, the top award of the festival.

At the Sundance Film Festival, writer Erez Kav-El won the World Cinema Screenwriting Award (Dramatic) for Restoration.

In Israel, Restoration received 11 nominations for the Ophir Awards.
