= György Pálfi =

Hungarian filmmaker (born 1974)

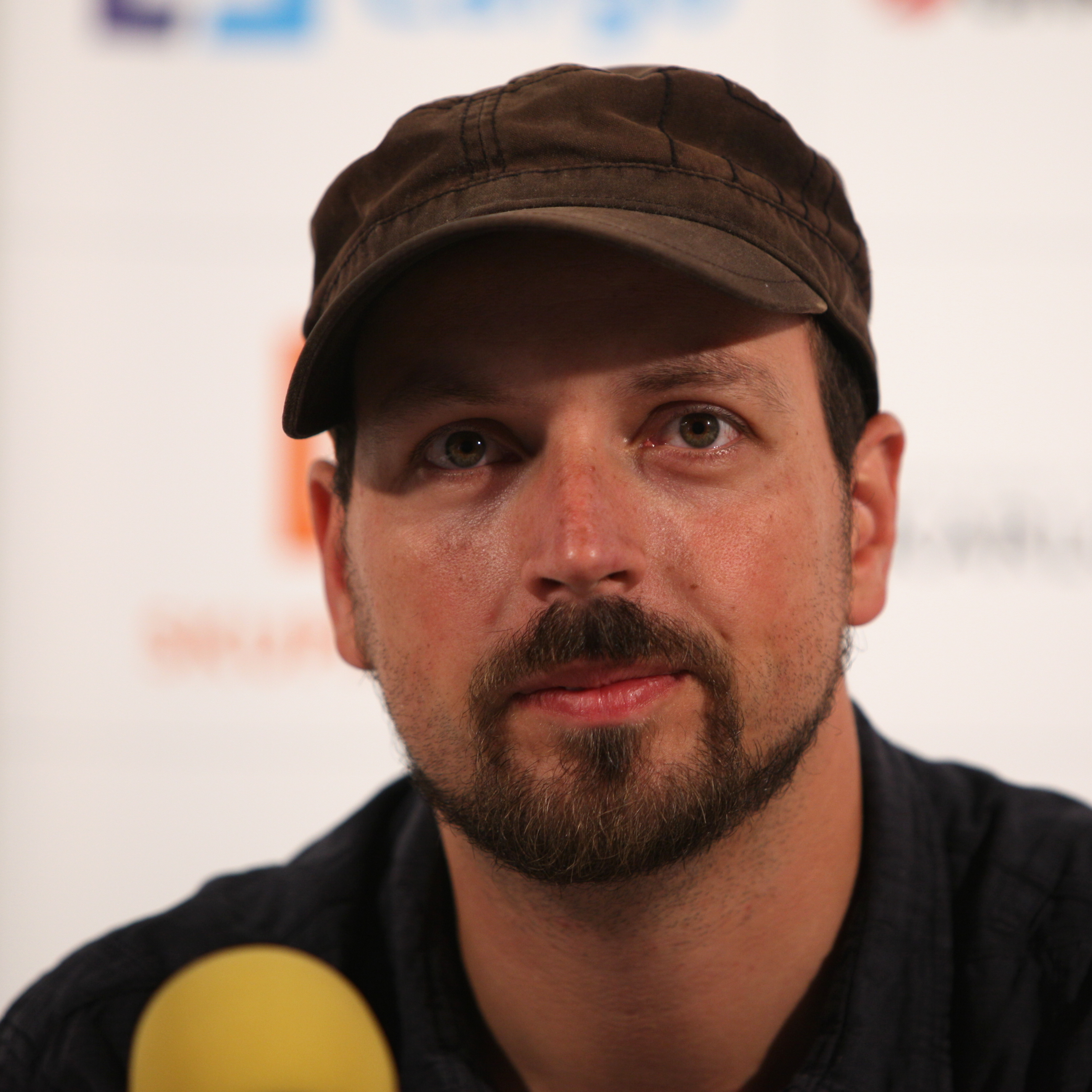
- György Pálfi in Karlovy Vary (2009)
- Born: 11 April 1974 (age 52); Budapest, Hungary
- Occupation: Filmmaker

György Pálfi (born 11 April 1974 in Budapest, Hungary) is a Hungarian filmmaker. His film Taxidermia was screened in the Un Certain Regard section at the 2006 Cannes Film Festival.

Pálfi's films have received numerous awards and nominations. At the 2002 European Film Awards, he won the European Discovery/Fassbinder Award for his début film Hukkle. At Les Arcs Film Festival in 2014, Pálfi won the first annual ARTE International Prize for the best project in development, The Voice, about a son searching for his father, a scientist who went missing 30 years ago.

Two of Pálfi's films have been Hungary's submission for the Academy Award for Best Foreign Language Film: Hukkle and Taxidermia.

He was a TorinoFilmLab Script&Pitch participant with his project The Voice.

Perpetuity, his latest movie was in the official selection of PÖFF Tallinn Black Nights Film Festival in 2021.

The world premiere of Pálfi's film Hen was held at the 50th Toronto International Film Festival (TIFF) in 2025 as part of the Platform Prize program.

== Filmography ==
=== Feature films ===
- Hukkle - 2002
- Taxidermia - 2006
- I Am Not Your Friend (Nem vagyok a barátod) - 2009
- Final Cut: Ladies and Gentlemen (Final Cut: Hölgyeim és uraim) - 2012
- Free Fall (Szabadesés) - 2014
- His Master's Voice (Az Úr hangja) - 2018
- Perpetuity (Mindörökké) - 2021
- Hen (Kota) - 2025

=== Short films ===
- A hal (1997)
- Jött egy busz... (2003) segment "Táltosember"
- Nem leszek a barátod (documentary short, 2009)
- Magyarország 2011 / Hungary 2011 (2011) segment

=== Television series ===
- Valaki kopog (television series, 2000) 1 episode
- Született lúzer (television series, 2008) 2 episodes

== Awards ==
- European Film Award for European Discovery of the Year (2002)

== Personal life ==
Pálfi's wife is the screenwriter Zsófia Ruttkay, with whom he regularly collaborates on his films.
