= Me You Them =

2000 film directed by Andrucha Waddington

- Movie poster
- Portuguese: Eu Tu Eles
- Directed by: Andrucha Waddington
- Written by: Elena Soarez
- Produced by: Pedro B. De Hollanda; Leonardo Monteiro de Barros; Flávio R. Tambellini; Andrucha Waddington
- Starring: Regina Casé; Lima Duarte
- Cinematography: Breno Silveira
- Edited by: Vicente Kubrusly
- Music by: Gilberto Gil
- Distributed by: Columbia TriStar Filmes do Brasil
- Release date: May 16, 2000
- Running time: 104 minutes
- Country: Brazil
- Language: Portuguese

Me You Them (Portuguese: Eu Tu Eles) is a 2000 Brazilian drama film directed by Andrucha Waddington and written by Elena Soarez. starring Regina Casé, Lima Duarte, Stenio Garcia.

The film produced by Pedro B. De Hollanda, Leonardo Monterrio de Barros, Andrucha Waddington.

== Cast ==
- Regina Casé as Darlene
- Lima Duarte as Osias
- Stênio Garcia as Zezinho
- Luiz Carlos Vasconcelos as Ciro
- Nilda Spencer as Raquel
- Diogo Lopes as Vaqueiro negro / Black herdsman
- Helena Araújo as Darlene's mother
- Iami Rebouças as Moça do forró / Young woman at ball
- Lucien Paulo as Capataz / Headman
- Borges Cunha as Registry employee
- Plácido Alves Neto as Dono da venda / Store owner
- D. Dinorah as Osias' mother
- José Pascoal as Rapaz do forró / Young man at ball
- Zé Brocoió as Locutor / Speaker 1
- Clesio Atanasio as Locutor / Speaker 2

== Reception ==
=== Critical response ===
Me You Them has an approval rating of 75% on review aggregator website Rotten Tomatoes, based on 56 reviews, and an average rating of 6.4/10. The website's critical consensus states: "Me You Them tells a warmly comical and touching story, and features a charismatically earthy performance by Casé". Metacritic assigned the film a weighted average score of 66 out of 100, based on 21 critics, indicating "generally favorable reviews".

=== Awards ===
- 53rd Cannes Film Festival - Un Certain Regard Special Distinction
- 2nd Grande Prêmio Cinema Brasil - Best Film, Best Actress (Regina Casé), Best Cinematography, Best Editing
- 35th Karlovy Vary International Film Festival - Crystal Globe, Best Actress (Regina Casé)

== See also ==
- As Canções de Eu Tu Eles, the soundtrack album for the film performed by Gilberto Gil.
- List of submissions to the 73rd Academy Awards for Best Foreign Language Film
- List of Brazilian submissions for the Academy Award for Best Foreign Language Film
