= Special Jury Prize (Karlovy Vary IFF) =

The Special Jury Prize is one of the main awards of the Feature Film Competition at the Karlovy Vary International Film Festival. It is the second highest award of the festival started since 1952; after the Crystal Globe.

== Special Jury Prize winners ==
1952–present

Year	Film	Original Title	Director	Country
2026	The Guest	Gæsten	Mads Mengel	Denmark
2025	Outcry	Bidad	Soheil Beiraghi	Iran
2023	Empty Nets	Toorhaye khali	Behrooz Karamizade	Germany, Iran
2022	You Have to Come and See It	Tenéis que venir a verla	Jonás Trueba	Spain
2018	Florianópolis Dream	Sueño Florianópolis	Ana Katz	Argentina, Brasil, France
2017	Men Don’t Cry	Muškarci ne plaču	Alen Drljević	Bosnia and Herzegovina, Slovenia, Croatia, Germany
2016	Zoology	Zoologiya	Ivan I. Tverdovskiy	Russia, France, Germany
2015	Those Who Fall Have Wings	Jeder der fällt hat Flügel	Peter Brunner	Austria
2014	Free Fall	Szabadesés	György Pálfi	Hungary, France, South Korea
2013	A Field in England		Ben Wheatley	United Kingdom
2012	Piazza Fontana: The Italian Conspiracy	Romanzo di una strage	Marco Tullio Giordana	Italy
2011	Gypsy	Cigán	Martin Šulík	Slovak Republic, Czech Republic
2010	Kooky		Jan Svěrák	Czech Republic, Denmark
2009	Twenty	Bist	Abdolreza Kahani	Iran
2008	The Photograph		Nan Achnas	Indonesia, France, Netherlands, Switzerland, Sweden
2007	Lucky Miles		Michael James Rowland	Australia
2006	Christmas Tree Upside Down (ex aequo)	Obarnata elha	Ivan Cherkelov, Vassil Zhivkov	Bulgaria, Germany
2006	Beauty in Trouble (ex aequo)	Kráska v nesnázích	Jan Hřebejk	Czech Republic
2005	What a Wonderful Place	Eize makom nifla	Eyal Halfon	Israel
2004	Here	Tu	Zrinko Ogresta	Croatia, Bosnia and Herzegovina
2003	Babusya	Babusja	Lidija Bobrovová	Russia, France
2002	Nowhere in Africa	Nirgendwo in Afrika	Caroline Link	Germany
2001	Hi, Tereska	Cześć Tereska	Robert Gliński	Poland
2000	The Big Animal (ex aequo)	Duze zwirze	Jerzy Stuhr	Poland
2000	Peppermint Candy (ex aequo)	Bakha satang	Lee Chang-dong	South Korea
1999	Show Me Love	Fucking Åmål	Lukas Moodysson	Sweden
1998	Full Moon	Den polnoluniya	Karen Šachnazarov	Russia
1997	The Good Life	La buena vida	David Trueba	Spain
1996	Svatá Klára	Clara Hakadusha	Ari Folman, Ori Sivan	Israel
1995	The Garden	Záhrada	Martin Šulík	Slovakia, Czech Republic
1994	Faust (ex aequo)	Lekce Faust	Jan Švankmajer	Czech Republic
1994	The Case of Bronek Pekosinski (ex aequo)	Przypadek Pekosińskiego	Grzegorz Królikiewicz	Poland
1992	Once Upon a Time, Cinema	Nassereddin shah, actor-e cinema	Mohsen Makhmalbaf	Iran
1990	Was It Us?	Byli jsme to my?	Antonín Máša	Czechoslovakia
1988	Pathfinder	Veiviseren	Nils Gaup	Norway
1978	The Marginal Ones	Oka Oori Katha	Mrinal Sen	India
1982-1986 - 2nd award conferred as "Grand Special Prize"
1986	Tanner	Der schwarze Tanner	Xavier Koller	Switzerland
1984	End of the Lonely Farm Berhof	Zánik samoty Berhof	Jiří Svoboda	Czechoslovakia, Poland
1984	El mil usos		Roberto G. Rivera	Mexico
1982	The Assistant	Pomocník	Zoroslav Záhon	Czechoslovakia
