= Miro Remo =

Slovak documentary filmmaker, director, screenwriter and cinematographer

- Born: Miroslav Remo; 9 April 1983 (age 43); Ladce, Czechoslovakia
- Education: Academy of Performing Arts in Bratislava
- Occupations: Film director; screenwriter; producer; cinematographer
- Years active: 2004–present
- Notable work: Arsy-Versy; Comeback; Coolture; Richard Müller: This Is Not Me; At Full Throttle; Better Go Mad in the Wild
- Website: www.miroremo.com

Miro Remo (born 9 April 1983) is a Slovak documentary film director, screenwriter, cinematographer and producer. His films include the short documentary Arsy-Versy (2009), the feature documentaries Comeback (2014), Cooltúra (2016), Richard Müller: This Is Not Me (2016) and At Full Throttle (2021). His 2025 documentary Better Go Mad in the Wild won the Karlovy Vary International Film Festival's Crystal Globe in the main competition. In 2026, the film received the Czech Lion for Best Documentary Feature and Remo won the award for Best Cinematography.

== Early life and education ==
Remo was born on 9 April 1983 in Ladce in Czechoslovakia (present-day Slovakia). After graduating from secondary school in Považská Bystrica, he studied mechatronics at Alexander Dubček University of Trenčín. He subsequently transferred to the documentary filmmaking programme at the Academy of Performing Arts in Bratislava (VŠMU), where he completed doctoral studies in documentary filmmaking in 2012.

Remo's interest in filmmaking was influenced by his family. His father, Miroslav Remo Sr., was an amateur filmmaker in Ladce and was involved in an amateur film group that worked with 8 mm film during the 1970s. Remo later made the documentary 8MM Boys (Osmičkári), about the group and its members.

During his studies, Remo directed several short documentaries, including Cold Joint (Studený spoj, 2007) and Ecce Homo (2008).

== Career ==
=== Arsy-Versy ===
Remo attracted international attention with his 23-minute student documentary Arsy-Versy, which premiered at the Uppsala International Short Film Festival in 2009. The film follows Ľubomír Remo, an amateur photographer and filmmaker fascinated by nature and bats, and his mother Jolana.

Arsy-Versy was screened at numerous international film festivals and received awards at festivals including Uppsala, Jihlava, Sheffield DocFest, Festival dei Popoli, Etiuda&Anima, the Munich International Festival of Film Schools and other festivals. The film also received the Slovak national IGRIC award.

The success of Arsy-Versy established Remo as a documentary filmmaker working primarily with observational and character-driven subjects.

=== Feature documentaries ===
Remo's first feature-length documentary, Comeback (2014), examines the reintegration of former prisoners into society after their release from Ilava prison in Slovakia. The film was presented at the Karlovy Vary International Film Festival.

In Coolture (Cooltúra, 2016), Remo examined aspects of Slovak popular culture and entertainment. The documentary combines observations of cultural events and personalities with a critical perspective on contemporary Slovak culture.

His 2016 documentary Richard Müller: This Is Not Me (Richard Müller: Nespoznaný) focuses on Slovak singer Richard Müller and follows his professional and personal life during a concert tour. Remo directed and co-wrote the film and also worked as a cinematographer. The film received the Czech Film Critics' Award for Best Documentary and several Slovak film awards.

=== At Full Throttle ===
Remo's documentary At Full Throttle (Láska pod kapotou, 2021) follows Jaroslav, a divorced former miner from a region affected by the economic transformation following the end of state socialism, and his relationship with his childhood friend Jitka. The film combines their personal relationship with Jaroslav's ambition to participate in automobile racing. It premiered at the Karlovy Vary International Film Festival in 2021. Remo directed the film and was one of its cinematographers and producers.

=== Better Go Mad in the Wild ===
In 2025, Remo directed Better Go Mad in the Wild (Raději zešílet v divočině), a Czech-Slovak documentary based loosely on the book of the same name by Czech writer Aleš Palán and photographer Jan Šibík. The film follows identical twin brothers František and Ondřej Klišík, who live in relative isolation in the Šumava region. The brothers' contrasting attitudes towards their isolated way of life form the central conflict of the documentary.

The film premiered in the Crystal Globe Competition at the 59th Karlovy Vary International Film Festival in July 2025. It won the festival's Crystal Globe, the main competition prize.

At the 2026 Czech Lion Awards, Better Go Mad in the Wild won Best Documentary Feature. Remo and Dušan Husár received the award for Best Cinematography, while Máté Csuport and Šimon Hájek won Best Film Editing. The movie also won Sun in a Net Awards for Best Documentary Film.

== Style and themes ==
Remo's documentary work frequently focuses on people living outside conventional social structures or pursuing unconventional ways of life. His subjects have included former prisoners, cultural figures, musicians, people from economically disadvantaged regions and individuals living in relative isolation. His films often combine observational documentary techniques with constructed visual compositions and elements of humour and absurdity.

His work has also repeatedly examined the relationship between individuals and their social or cultural environment. In Comeback, the subject is the difficulty of reintegration into society after imprisonment, while At Full Throttle explores personal aspirations and relationships against the background of economic and social change. Better Go Mad in the Wild similarly examines the relationship between individual freedom, family ties and an unconventional lifestyle.

== Production ==
Remo was a co-founder of the production company Ozon Film, which operated from 2004 to 2014. In 2010 he co-founded the production company Arsy-Versy, named after his 2009 documentary. He has worked on his films as a director, screenwriter, cinematographer and producer.

== Filmography ==
Year	Title	Role
2006	Jano	Director
2007	Cold Joint (Studený spoj)	Director, cinematographer/editor
2008	Ecce Homo	Director, cinematographer, editor, producer
2009	Arsy-Versy	Director, screenwriter
2011	Pohoda Festival	Director, screenwriter, producer
2011	8MM Boys (Osmičkári)	Director
2012	Tibor Huszar – Comeback (Tibor Huszár - Návrat späť)	Director, screenplay
2012	Beverly Hills 01863	Director
2014	Vrbovian Wind (Vrbovský veter)	Director, screenwriter, cinematographer, producer
2014	Comeback	Director, screenwriter, producer
2016	Coolture (Cooltúra)	Director, screenwriter, cinematographer, producer
2016	Richard Müller: This Is Not Me (Richard Müller: Nespoznaný)	Director, screenwriter, cinematographer, producer
2021	At Full Throttle (Láska pod kapotou)	Director, screenwriter, cinematographer, producer
2025	Better Go Mad in the Wild (Raději zešílet v divočině)	Director, screenwriter, cinematographer, producer

The filmography is primarily based on the Slovak Film Institute (SFÚ), Filmova Akademie, DokWeb and Miro Remo official website.

== Awards and recognition ==
Among the major awards received by Remo and his films are the Crystal Globe at the Karlovy Vary International Film Festival for Better Go Mad in the Wild in 2025, the Czech Lion for Best Documentary Feature in 2026, the Czech Lion for Best Cinematography for Remo and Dušan Husár and Sun in a Net Awards for Best Documentary Film in 2026. His earlier documentary This Is Not Me received the Czech Film Critics' Award for Best Documentary and the IGRIC national film award for Remo's direction.
