= Martin Štrba (cinematographer) =

Slovak cinematographer (born 1961)

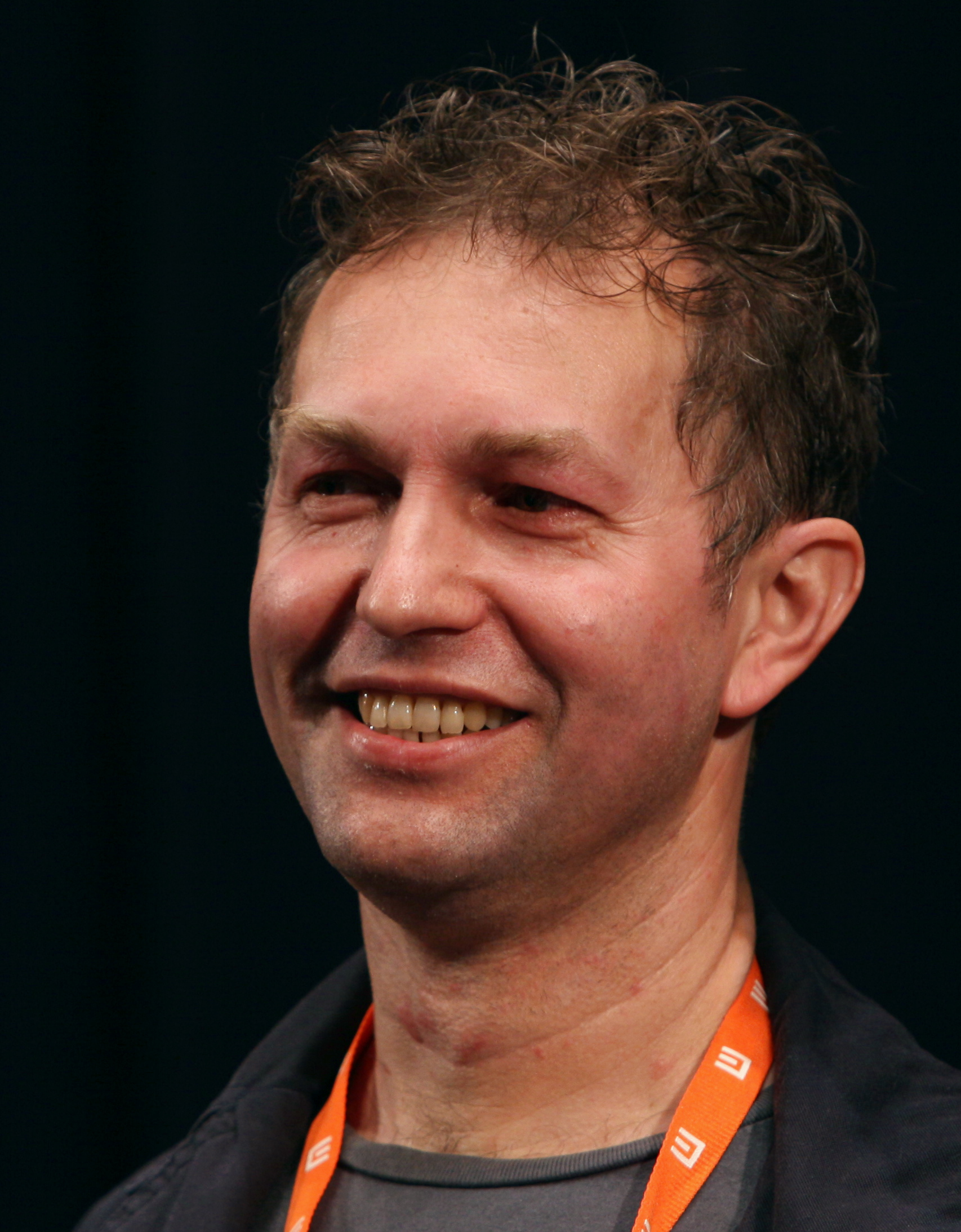
- Martin Štrba na KVIFF
- Born: 26 August 1961 (age 64); Levice, Czechoslovakia
- Occupation: Cinematographer
- Years active: 1991–present
- Awards: Czech Lion Award for Best Cinematography (Charlatan, 2020 Czech Lion Awards, 2020); Cross of Pribina class I (Reduta, Zuzana Čaputová, President of Slovakia, 2023); Czech Lion Award for Best Cinematography (Sekal Has to Die, 1998); Czech Lion Award for Best Cinematography (Burning Bush, 2013); Czech Lion Award for Best Cinematography (A Prominent Patient, 2016); Czech Lion Award for Best Stage Design (Andel Exit, 2000)

Martin Štrba (born 26 August 1961) is a Slovak cinematographer. He contributed to more than fifty films since 1991 including The Garden and Autumn Spring.
