= Sun in a Net Awards =

Slovak film awards

Sun in a Net Awards Slnko v sieti
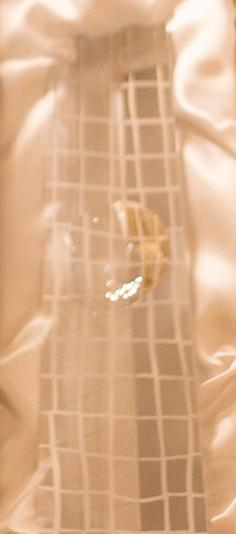
- Awarded for: Excellence in cinematic (and, at least historically, televisual) achievements
- Country: Slovakia
- Presented by: Slovak Film and Television Academy (SFTA)
- Website: https://slnkovsieti.sk/

The Sun in a Net Awards (Slovak: Slnko v sieti) are annual awards that recognize accomplishments in filmmaking and television. It is the highest award of achievement in film awarded in Slovakia. It is organised by the Slovak Film and Television Academy. Awards were originally held bi-annually.

The awards were established in 2004. The award is named after the 1963 Slovak-language film The Sun in a Net. The first awards were held in 2006.

== Categories ==
- Best Film
- Best Documentary
- Best Animated Film
- Best Director
- Best Screenplay
- Best Cinematography
- Best Editing
- Best Sound
- Best Scenography
- Best Music
- Best Costumes
- Best Masks
- Best Actor in Leading Role
- Best Actress in Leading Role
- Best Supporting Actor
- Best Supporting Actress

== Best film winners ==
Year	English title	Original title	Director
2006	The City of the Sun	Sluneční stát	Martin Šulík
2008	Music	Muzika	Juraj Nvota
2010	Soul at Peace	Pokoj v duši	Vladimir Balko
2012	The House	Dom	Zuzana Liová
2014	My Dog Killer	Môj pes Killer	Mira Fornay
2016	Eva Nová	Eva Nová	Marko Škop
2017	The Teacher	Učiteľka	Jan Hřebejk
2018	The Line	Čiara	Peter Bebjak
2019	The Interpreter	Tlmočník	Martin Šulík
2020	Let There Be Light	Nech je svetlo	Marko Škop
2020-21	107 Mothers	Cenzorka	Péter Kerekes
2022	Victim	Obeť	Michal Blaško
2023	Invalid	Invalid	Josef Karásek
2024	Waves	Vlny	Jiří Mádl
2025	Father	Otec	Tereza Nvotová
