= Martin Šulík =

Slovak film director (born 1962)

- Born: October 20, 1962; Žilina, Czechoslovakia
- Education: Academy of Performing Arts in Bratislava
- Occupation: Film director

Martin Šulík (born 20 October 1962) is a Slovak film director. He studied film directing at the Academy of Performing Arts in Bratislava, where he graduated in 1986. His 2011 film Gypsy was selected as the Slovak entry for the Best Foreign Language Film at the 84th Academy Awards, but it did not make the final shortlist. Martin Sulik is also an avid painter, and his artwork has been shown in Bratislava Galleries.

== Filmography ==
- The Position (1989)
- Tenderness (1992)
- Everything I Like (1993)
- The Garden (1995)
- Orbis Pictus (1997)
- Landscape (2000)
- The Key to Determining Dwarfs (2002)
- The City of the Sun (2005)
- Gypsy (2011)
- The Interpreter (2018)
