= Karlovy Vary International Film Festival =

Annual film festival in the Czech Republic

- Location: Karlovy Vary, Czech Republic
- Founded: 1946; 80 years ago
- Awards: Crystal Globe
- Artistic director: Karel Och (since 2010)
- Website: www.kviff.com

Current: 60th
- 61st 50th

The Karlovy Vary International Film Festival (Czech: Mezinárodní filmový festival Karlovy Vary, KVIFF) is an annual film festival held in Karlovy Vary, Czech Republic. The Karlovy Vary Festival is one of the oldest in the world and has become the leading film event in Central and Eastern Europe.

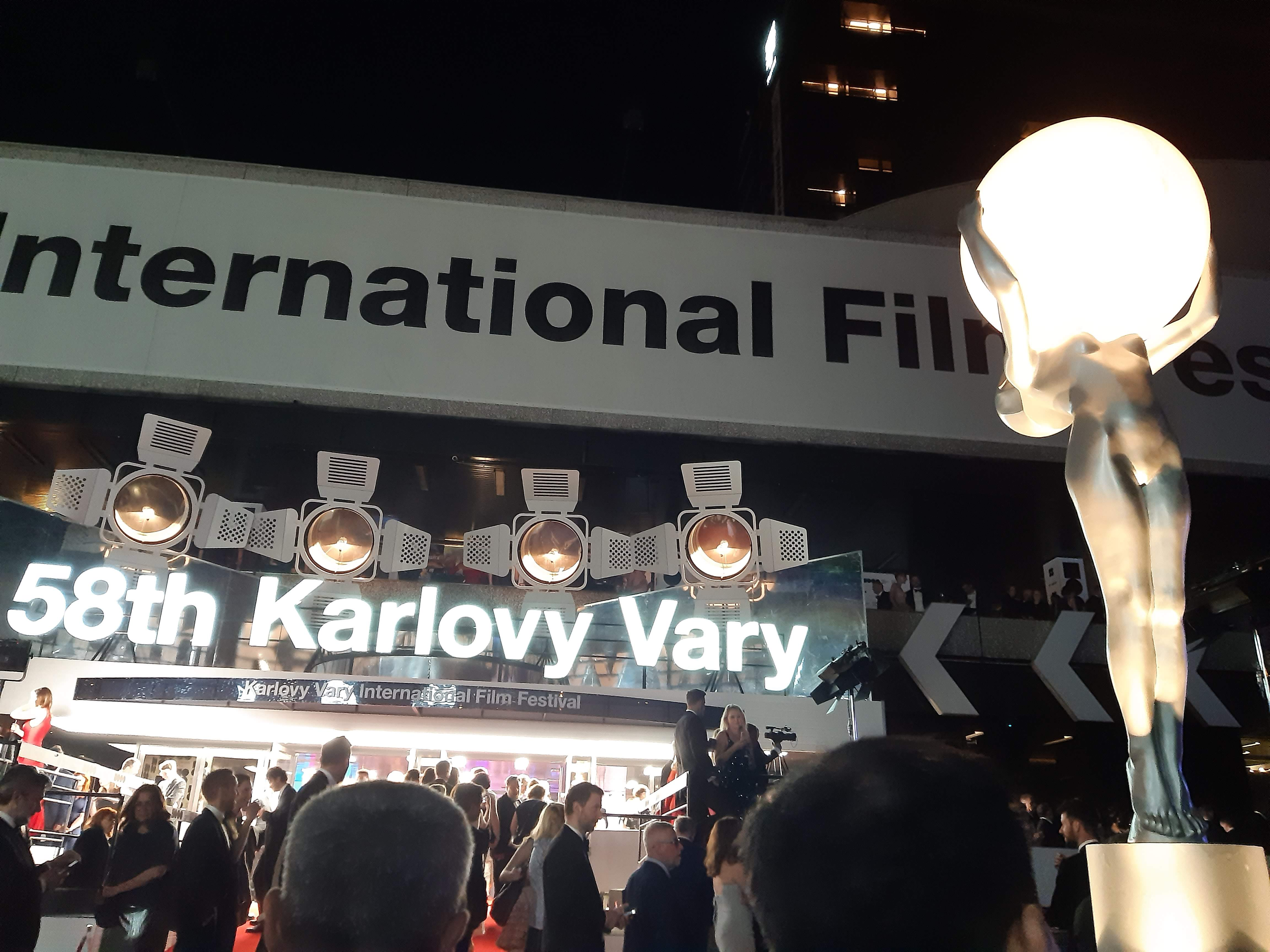
58th Karlovy Vary International Film Festival

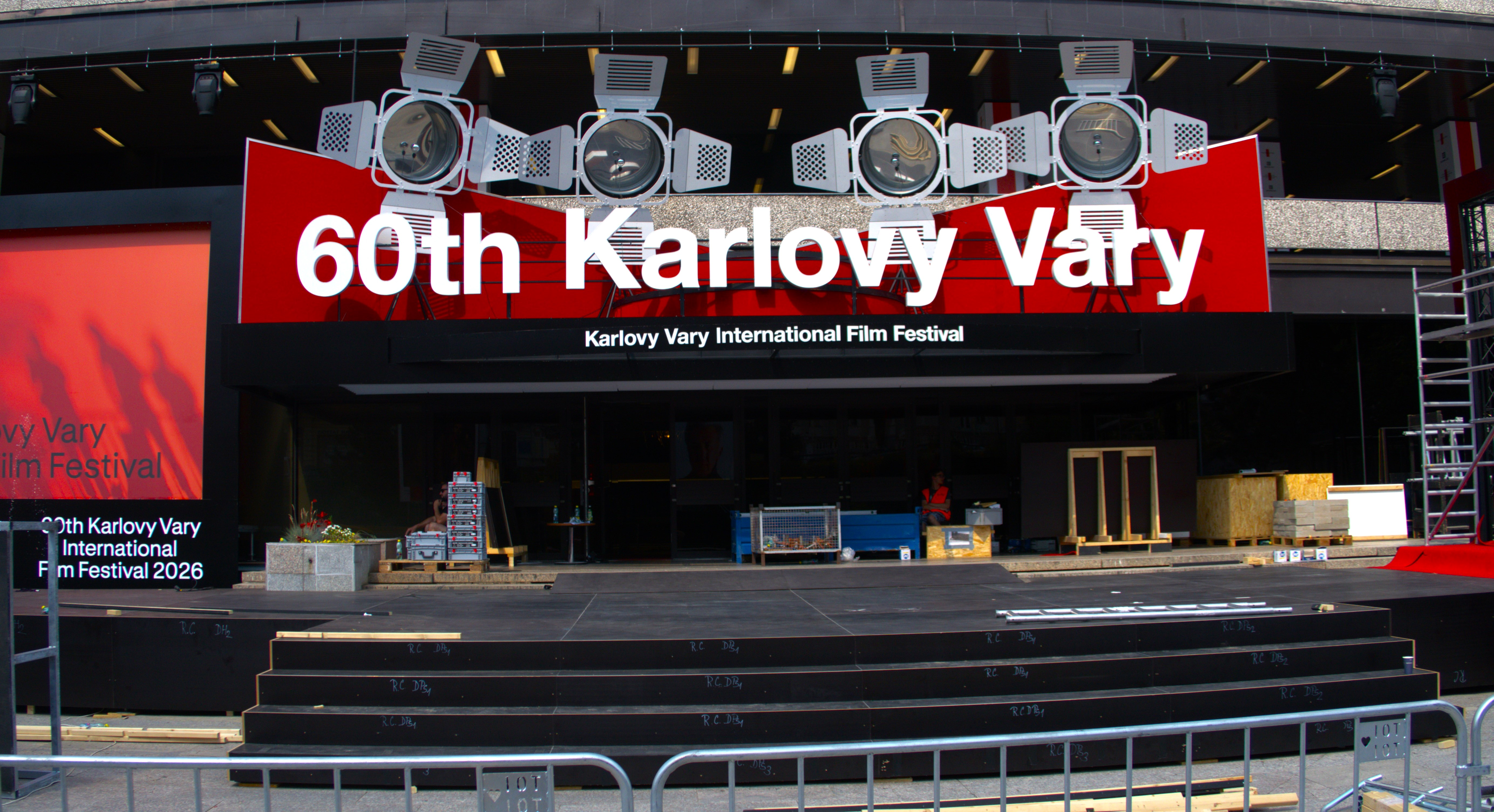
60th Karlovy Vary International Film Festival

== History ==
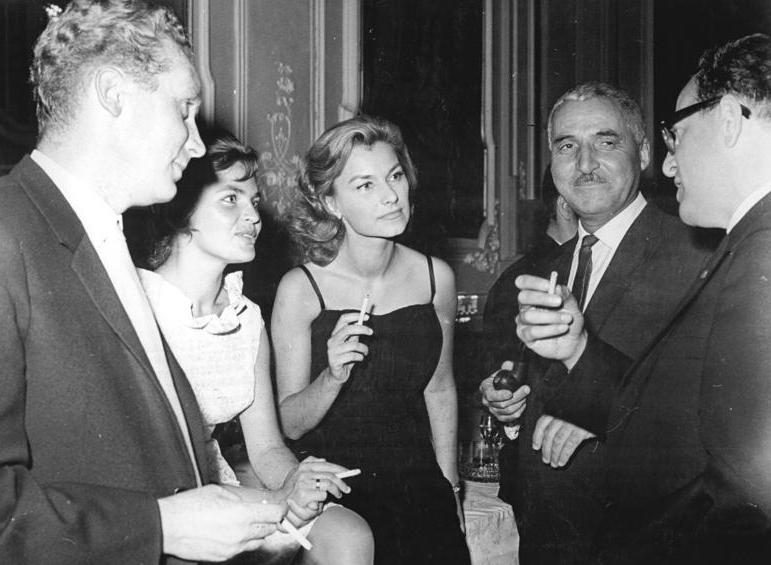
The Karlovy Vary Film Festival 1964 (Frank Beyer, Christel Bodenstein, Christine Laszar and Konstantin Simonov)

The pre-war dream of many enthusiastic filmmakers materialized in 1946 when a non-competition festival of films from seven countries took place in Mariánské Lázně and Karlovy Vary. Above all it was intended to screen the results of the recently nationalized Czechoslovak film industry. After the first two years the festival moved permanently to Karlovy Vary.

The Karlovy Vary IFF first held an international film competition in 1948. Since 1951, an international jury has evaluated the films. The Karlovy Vary competition quickly found a place among other developing festivals and by 1956 FIAPF had already classified Karlovy Vary as a category A festival. Given the creation of the Moscow Film Festival and the political decision to organize only one "A" festival for all socialist countries, Karlovy Vary was forced to alternate year by year with Moscow IFF between 1959 and 1993.

The social and political changes that took place after the Velvet Revolution in November 1989 pushed concerns about organizing the Karlovy Vary IFF to the background. The program for 1990 was saved by the release of a collection of Czechoslovak films that had been locked up for years in a storage vault. And the appearance of a number of international guests such as Miloš Forman, Lindsay Anderson, Annette Bening and Robert De Niro helped as well. Future festivals were in doubt. Financial problems and a lack of interest on the part of the government, organizers and viewers almost ended the festival's long tradition in 1992.

In 1994, the 29th Karlovy Vary IFF inaugurated an entirely new tradition. After nearly forty years of alternating with the Moscow IFF, the festival began once again to take place every year. The Karlovy Vary Film Festival Foundation was set up in 1993 co-created by the Ministry of Culture, The City of Karlovy Vary, and the Grand Hotel Pupp. Actor Jiří Bartoška was invited to be the festival's president, and Eva Zaoralová became program director in 1995. Since 1998, the organization of the festival has been carried out by Film Servis Festival Karlovy Vary, a joint-stock company.

The 2020 edition was cancelled due to the COVID-19 pandemic; a shortened event was later scheduled for 18–21 November, which will not be counted as an official edition of the festival (being promoted as the 54th and-a-half edition). Due to the ongoing Russo-Ukrainian War, portions of the Odesa International Film Festival were hosted at KVIFF in July 2022.

To mark its 80th anniversary in July 2026, the festival replaced its traditional opening night fireworks with a 10-minute multimedia performance featuring 1300 drones, making it the largest drone show ever staged in Czech Republic history.

== Program ==
The main center of the festival is Hotel Thermal. The core of the program is the feature film competition; in accordance with FIAPF regulations only those films which have not been shown in competition at any other international festivals can be included. The documentary competition is an important festival event. The extensive informative program features both distribution pre-premiers and films awarded at other festivals. But it also includes discoveries of artistic creations by independent directors, productions coming out of little known film industries, retrospectives, and an overview of Czech film output during the past year. For the tenth straight year the festival will present Variety Critics' Choice: new and interesting films of mainly European production selected by critics working at this prestigious magazine.

Seminars focusing primarily on European film are another important part of the festival.

Thousands of visitors and the variety of films testify to the effectiveness of the program team with program director Eva Zaoralová at its head. Many films are purchased at the festival for wider distribution or, upon receiving a festival award, may attract the attention of major producers, distributors, and the media.

The festival program has the following sections:

- Official Selection — Competition – films never before shown in competition at any other international festival.
- East of the West — Competition – films from the former socialist bloc.
- Documentary Films — Competition – a competition divided into two parts: documentaries less than and longer than 30 minutes.
- Horizons and Another View – a selection of the most remarkable contemporary films.
- Imagina — films with an unconventional approach to narration and style, distinctive and radical visions of film language.
- Out of the Past — classic, cult, rare and unfairly overlooked films, screened in their original and restored versions.
- Future Frames: Generation NEXT of European Cinema — ten directors, an upcoming generation of young European filmmakers, present their student films. The project is organized in cooperation with European Film Promotion.
- Midnight Screenings/Afterhours — a selection of the latest horror and action films, works that look at their genres in new, often humorous, ways. From 59th edition in 2025 it was renamed as "Afterhours".
- Czech Films – a representative selection of current Czech films.
- KVIFF Eastern Promises Industry Days — the industry section of the festival that includes Works in Development, First Cut+ and Works in Progress project presentations. The winners in these categories receive a $5000 prize.
- Tributes, special focuses and retrospectives.

== Awards ==
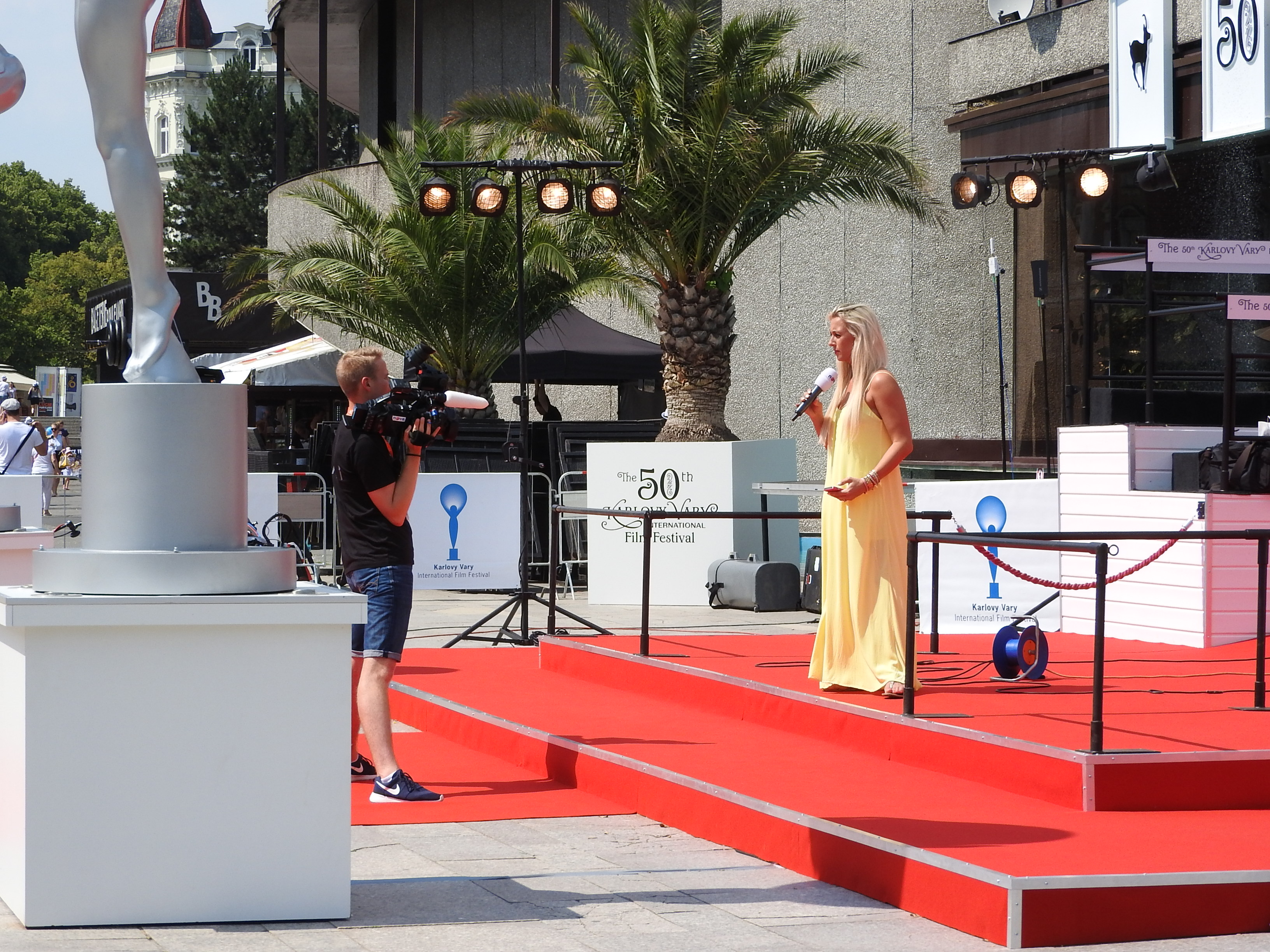
A reporter during the 50th film festival

Since 1948, the Grand Prize has been the Crystal Globe – although its form has often changed. As of the 35th Karlovy Vary IFF 2000 the Crystal Globe has taken on a new look: now the figure of a woman stands raising a crystal ball (artistic concept developed by Tono Stano, Aleš Najbrt, Michal Caban, and Šimon Caban).

The Feature Film Competition is divided into the following main awards:

- Grand Prix – Crystal Globe for best feature film ($25,000)
- Special Jury Prize ($15,000)
- Best Director Award
- Best Actress Award
- Best Actor Award

The Documentary Competition is divided into the following main awards:

- Best Documentary Film in the category for film lasting 30 minutes or less
- Best Documentary Film in the category for film lasting above 30 minutes in length

Each year, the festival also presents the Crystal Globe for Outstanding Contribution to World Cinema.

== Prominent foreign guests ==
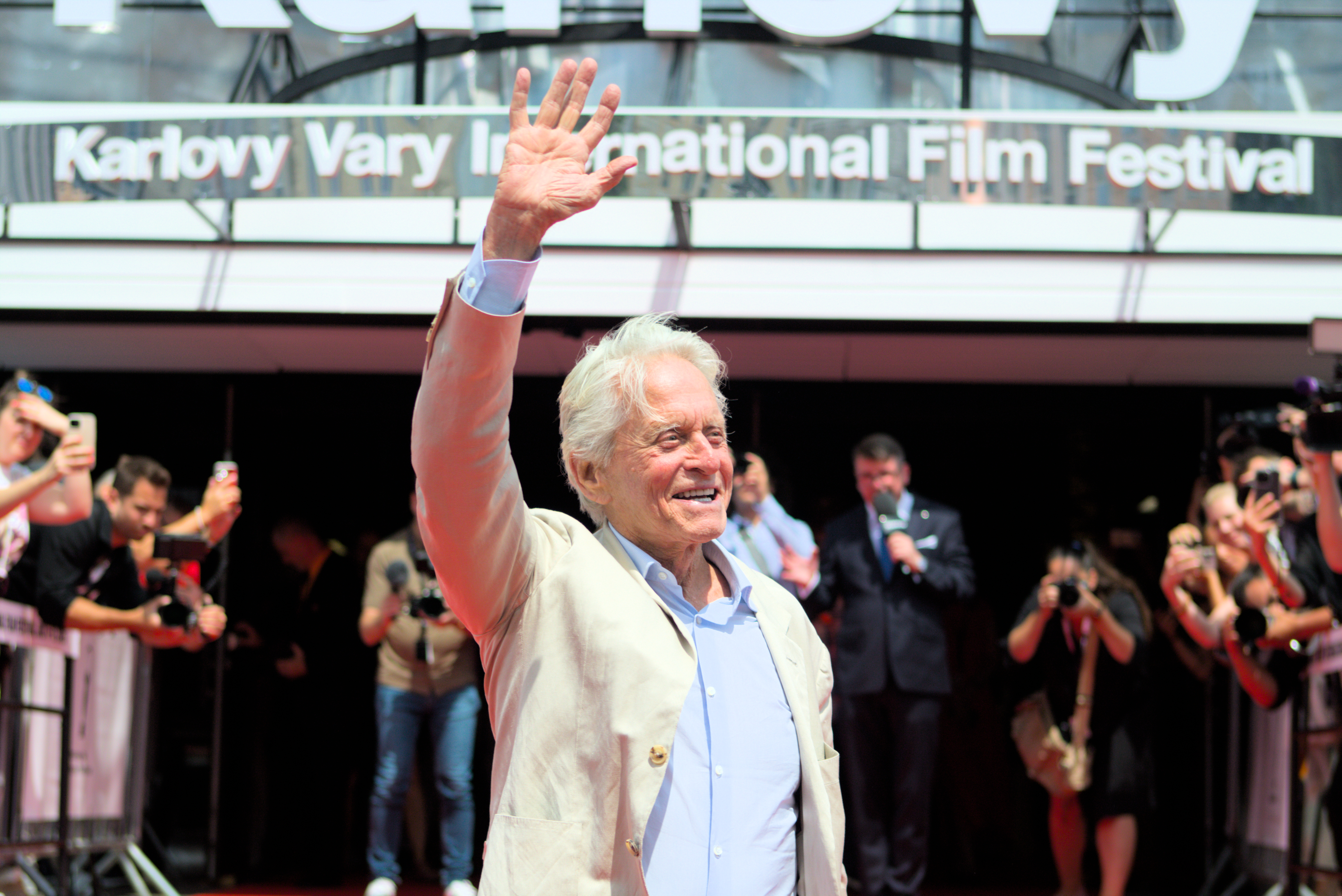
Michael Douglas at the 59th Karlovy Vary International Film Festival

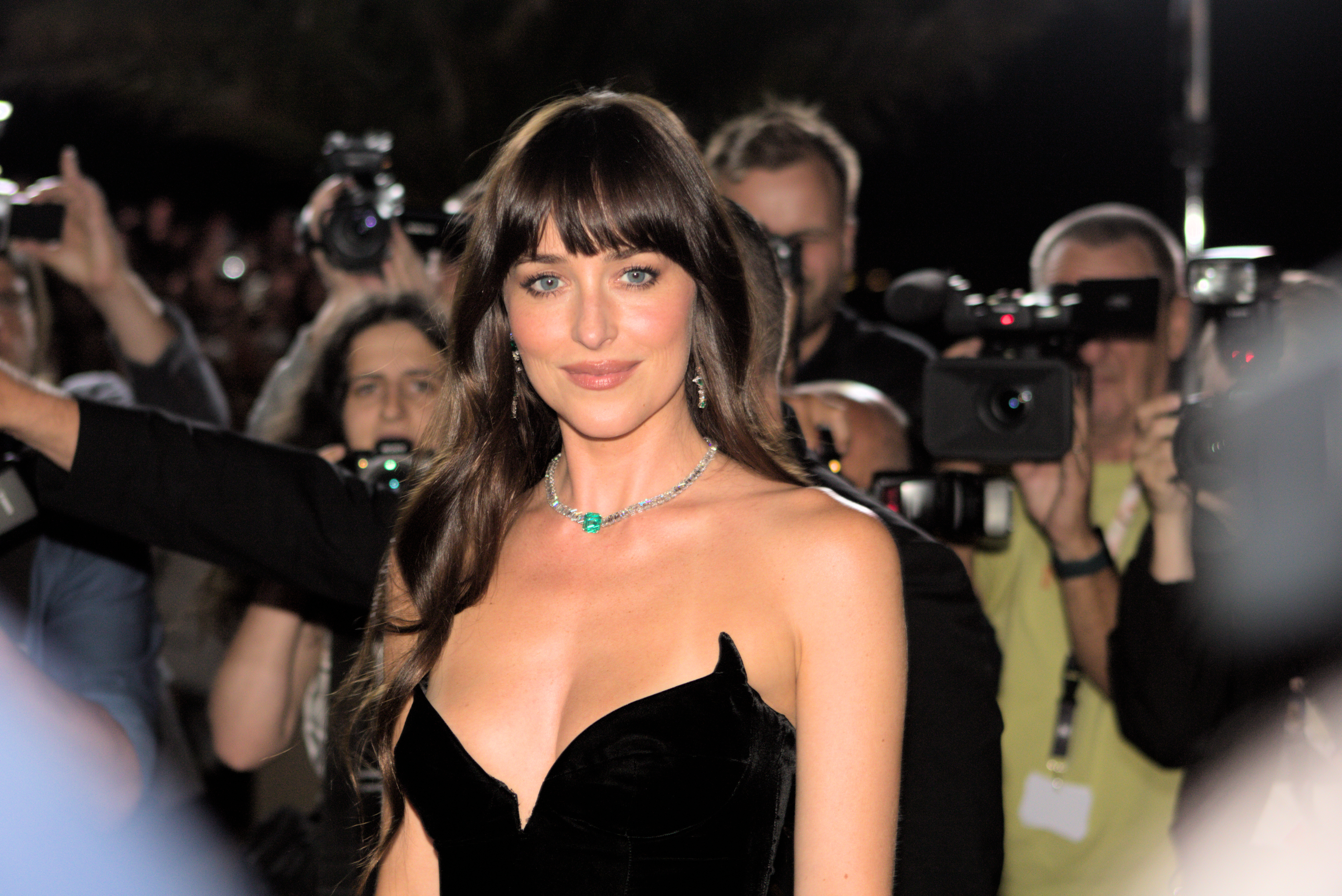
Dakota Johnson at the 59th Karlovy Vary International Film Festival

- 1946: Nikolay Cherkasov, Lyubov Orlova, Rita Hayworth
- 1956: Dev Anand, Luis Buñuel, Alberto Cavalcanti
- 1960: Waltraut Haas, Irina Skobtseva, Irina Petrescu, Mari Törőcsik
- 1962: Shirley MacLaine, Frank Capra, Bernard Blier
- 1964: Claudia Cardinale, Henry Fonda, Richard Attenborough
- 1966: Olga Schoberová, Brad Harris, Ján Kadár
- 1968: Tony Curtis, Pierre Brice, Raf Vallone
- 1970: Ken Loach
- 1972: Daniil Khrabrovitsky
- 1974: Andrei Konchalovsky
- 1976: Humberto Solás
- 1978: Stanislav Rostotsky
- 1980: Günther Rücker
- 1982: Franco Nero, Sergei Bondarchuk
- 1983: Om Puri for Ardh Satya
- 1984: Monica Vitti, Sergei Gerasimov
- 1986: Giulietta Masina
- 1988: Bernardo Bertolucci, Xie Jin
- 1990: Miloš Forman, Robert De Niro, Annette Bening, Maximilian Schell, Shirley Temple
- 1992: Coen brothers, Jason Connery, Aki Kaurismäki, Ken Loach, Agnieszka Holland
- 1994: Leonardo DiCaprio, Max von Sydow, Philippe Noiret
- 1995: Peter O'Toole, Fridrik Thór Fridriksson, Mia Farrow, Mika Kaurismäki, Gina Lollobrigida
- 1996: Alan Alda, Whoopi Goldberg, Gregory Peck, Ivan Passer, Pierre Richard, Frank Langella
- 1997: Miloš Forman, Salma Hayek, Ivan Passer, Nikita Mikhalkov, Steve Buscemi
- 1998: Michael Douglas, Ornella Muti, Saul Zaentz, Terry Jones
- 1999: Woody Harrelson, Lukas Moodysson, Nikita Mikhalkov
- 2000: Woody Harrelson, Edward Norton, Fridrik Thór Fridriksson, Eli Wallach, Heather Graham, Alicia Silverstone
- 2001: Scarlett Johansson, Nastassja Kinski, Oleg Taktarov, Thora Birch
- 2002: Kim Ki-duk, Keira Knightley, István Szabó, Michael York
- 2003: Morgan Freeman, William Forsythe, Kim Ki-duk, Udo Kier, Zlatko Topčić
- 2004: Elijah Wood, Roman Polanski, Jacqueline Bisset, John Cleese, Bernard Hill, Harvey Keitel, Albert Maysles
- 2005: Sharon Stone, Robert Redford, Alexander Payne, Gael García Bernal, Liv Ullmann, Matt Dillon, Catherine Deneuve
- 2006: Andy García, Terry Gilliam, Kim Ki-duk, Danny Trejo
- 2007: Renée Zellweger, Danny DeVito, Elliot Page, Tom DiCillo, Cybill Shepherd
- 2008: Robert De Niro, Les Blank, Kim Bodnia, Saffron Burrows, Danny Glover, John Sayles, Christopher Lee
- 2009: Antonio Banderas, John Malkovich, Isabelle Huppert
- 2010: Jude Law, Nikita Mikhalkov, Kevin McDonald, Scott Cooper, Zlatko Topčić, Adrian Grenier
- 2011: John Malkovich, Judi Dench, John Turturro, Cary Fukunaga, Sasson Gabai, Remo Girone
- 2012: Helen Mirren, Susan Sarandon, Richard Peña, István Szabó, Helena Třeštíková
- 2013: John Travolta, Oliver Stone, F. Murray Abraham, Valeria Golino, Agnieszka Holland, Lou Castel, Jerry Schatzberg, Michel Gondry
- 2014: Mel Gibson, Michael Pitt, Jake Hoffman, Franco Nero, Fanny Ardant, Laura Dern, Mike Cahill, Astrid Bergès-Frisbey
- 2015: Richard Gere, Harvey Keitel, George A. Romero, Jamie Dornan, Sean Ellis, Jena Malone, Ryan Fleck, Udo Kier, Ben Mendelsohn, Alba Rohrwacher
- 2016: Jean Reno, Willem Dafoe, Charlie Kaufman, Sergi López, Adriana Ugarte, Emma Suárez, Jamie Dornan, Toby Jones
- 2017: Uma Thurman, Casey Affleck, Jeremy Renner, James Newton Howard, Ken Loach
- 2018: Tim Robbins, Robert Pattinson, Terry Gilliam, Taika Waititi, Anna Paquin, Barry Levinson
- 2019: Julianne Moore, Casey Affleck, Patricia Clarkson, Billy Crudup
- 2021: Johnny Depp, Ethan Hawke, Michael Caine
- 2022: Geoffrey Rush, Benicio del Toro, Liev Schreiber
- 2023: Russell Crowe, Ewan McGregor, Alicia Vikander, Robin Wright, Patricia Clarkson, Michael Fassbender, Mary Elizabeth Winstead, Christine Vachon
- 2024: Clive Owen, Daniel Brühl, Steven Soderbergh, Viggo Mortensen, Geoffrey Rush
- 2025: Michael Douglas, Vicky Krieps, Peter Sarsgaard, Stellan Skarsgård, Dakota Johnson, Agnieszka Holland
- 2026: Dustin Hoffman, Harvey Keitel, Juliette Binoche, Kevin Bacon, Kyra Sedgwick, Maggie Gyllenhaal, Jesse Eisenberg, Jeffrey Wright, Robert Richardson

== Crystal Globe Winners – Grand Prix ==
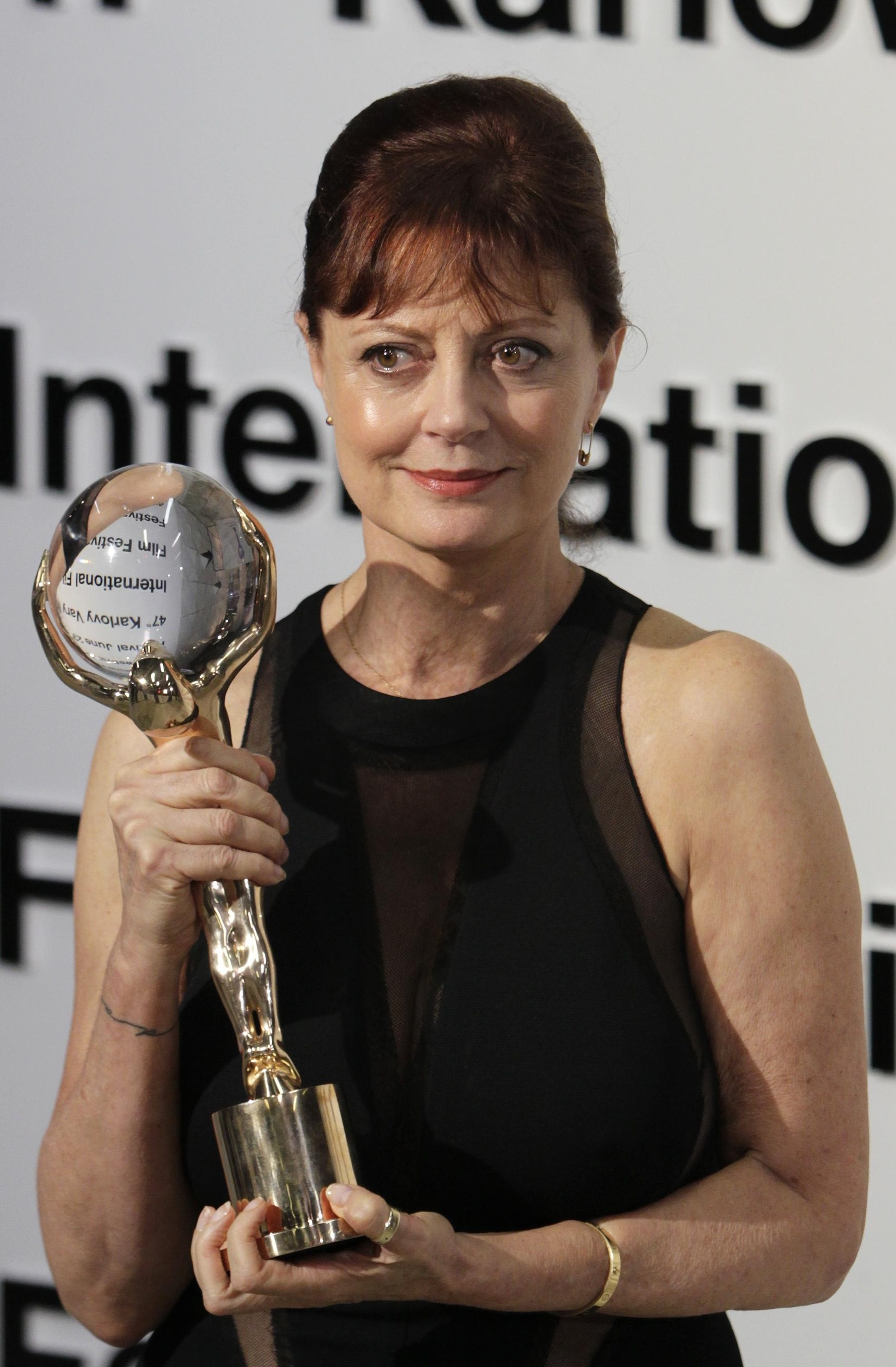
Susan Sarandon with the Crystal Globe for Outstanding Artistic Contribution to World Cinema (2012)

- 2026 Fruit Gathering – Aung Phyoe
- 2025 Better Go Mad in the Wild – Miro Remo
- 2024 A Sudden Glimpse to Deeper Things – Mark Cousins
- 2023 Blaga's Lessons (Bulgaria, Germany) – director Stephan Komandarev
- 2022 Summer with Hope (Iran, Canada) – director Sadaf Foroughi
- 2021 As Far as I Can Walk (Serbia) – director Stefan Arsenijević
- 2019 The Father (Bulgaria, Greece) – directors Kristina Grozeva, Petar Valchanov
- 2018 I Do Not Care If We Go Down in History as Barbarians (Romania) – director Radu Jude
- 2017 Little Crusader (Czech Republic) – director Václav Kadrnka
- 2016 It's Not the Time of My Life (Hungary) – director Szabolcs Hajdu
- 2015 Bob and the Trees (USA, France) – director Diego Ongaro
- 2014 Corn Island (Georgia) – director Giorgi Ovashvili
- 2013 The Notebook (Hungary) – director János Szász
- 2012 The Almost Man (Norway) – director Martin Lund
- 2011 Restoration (Israel) – director Yossi (Joseph) Madmoni
- 2010 The Mosquito Net (Spain) – director Agustí Vila
- 2009 Angel at Sea (Belgium/Canada) – director Frédéric Dumont
- 2008 Terribly Happy (Denmark) – director Henrik Ruben Genz
- 2007 Jar City (Iceland/Germany) – director Baltasar Kormákur
- 2006 Sherrybaby (USA) – director Laurie Collyer
- 2005 My Nikifor (Poland) – director Krzysztof Krauze
- 2004 A Children's Story (Italy) – director Andrea Frazzi, Antonio Frazzi
- 2003 Facing Windows (Italy, GB, Turkey, Portugal) – director Ferzan Özpetek
- 2002 Year of The Devil (Czech Republic) – director Petr Zelenka
- 2001 Amélie (France) – director Jean-Pierre Jeunet
- 2000 Me You Them (Brazil) – director Andrucha Waddington
- 1999 Yana's Friends (Israel) – director Arik Kaplun
- 1998 Streetheart (Canada) – director Charles Binamé
- 1997 Ma vie en rose (Belgium, France, GB) – director Alain Berliner
- 1996 Prisoner of the Mountains (Russia, Kazakhstan) – director Sergej Bodrov
- 1995 The Ride (Czech republic) – director Jan Svěrák
- 1994 My Soul Brother (Spain) – director Mariano Barroso
- for older winners (... 1946) see Crystal Globe.

== See also ==
- List of film festivals in the Czech Republic
