= 3 Weeks After =

2026 Serbian drama film

- Theatrical release poster
- Serbian: 3 nedelje posle
- Directed by: Miroslav Terzić
- Screenplay by: Miroslav Terzić; Vladimir Arsenijević; Bojan Vuletić
- Produced by: Snežana van Houwelingen; Branislav Trifunović
- Starring: Jovan Ginić; Klara Hrvanović; Andjela Alavirević; Tihana Lazović; Branislav Trifunović
- Cinematography: Damjan Radovanović
- Edited by: Marko Ferković
- Music by: Sonja Lončar; Andrija Pavlović
- Production companies: This and That Productions; Invictus Ltd.; Nightswim; Kinorama; PTD Studio – Paul Thiltges Distribution
- Distributed by: Bendita Film Sales
- Release date: 7 July 2026 (KVIFF)
- Running time: 94 minutes
- Countries: Serbia; Bulgaria; Italy; Croatia; Luxembourg
- Language: Serbian

3 Weeks After (Serbian: 3 nedelje posle) is a 2026 drama film directed by Miroslav Terzić, who co-wrote the screenplay with Vladimir Arsenijević and Bojan Vuletić. Starring Jovan Ginić, Klara Hrvanović, Andjela Alavirević, Tihana Lazović, and Branislav Trifunović, the film inspired by real events follows a group of high school students whose class trip takes an unsettling turn after they become stranded in a remote mountain hotel, where the recent suicide of one of their classmates resurfaces unresolved grief and hidden tensions.

The film, a co-production between Serbia, Bulgaria, Italy, Croatia, and Luxembourg premiered at 60th Karlovy Vary International Film Festival on 7 July 2026, where it was nominated for the Crystal Globe, and won the Europa Cinemas Label Award.

== Cast ==
- Jovan Ginić as Tsosta (Zoza)
- Klara Hrvanović
- Andjela Alavirević
- Tihana Lazović
- Branislav Trifunović

== Production ==
Miroslav Terzić began writing the film in 2023. During the screenplay's development, a mass shooting at a school in Serbia, the director's home country, occurred, lending additional contemporary resonance to the film's exploration of adolescent trauma and loss. For the casting process, the filmmakers auditioned around 500–600 children and teenagers before selecting a final ensemble of 24 young performers. The director encouraged the cast to improvise extensively during rehearsals and filming.

== Release ==
3 Weeks After had its world premiere at the 60th Karlovy Vary International Film Festival on 7 July 2026 in Crystal Globe Competition. The Bendita Film Sales has acquired the international sales rights of the film.

The film had its Croatian premiere on 14 July 2026 at the Pula Film Festival. In July 2026, it was also showcased at the Giffoni Film Festival in Films in Competition. It was screened at UNIQA Open Air Cinema Stari Grad at the 32nd Sarajevo Film Festival, in the Open Air Premiere section on 20 August 2026 and vied for Prix Cineplexx Award.

The film had its North American Premiere at Fantastic Fest on 19 September 2026. It was screened in Expectations section of the Rio de Janeiro International Film Festival on 1 October 2026.

In November, it had its Spanish premiere at the 23rd Seville European Film Festival.

It will compete in the International Competition of the 57th International Film Festival of India in November 2026.

== Reception ==
In his review at Karlovy Vary International Film Festival, David Acacia of the International Cinephile Society rated the film with 4 stars out of five and praised the lead actor Jovan Ginić for his "compelling performance". Acacia wrote that despite its heavy themes, a sly streak of dark humour keeps the film feeling surprisingly fresh. Concluding his review Acacia made a profound observation that solving hard problems or setting the standard is never simple, which is exactly why those with power must use it to safeguard those without. Vladan Petkovic, reviewing the film at the Karlovy Vary International Film Festival for Cineuropa, praised it as a visually striking and emotionally unsettling drama. He noted that the film's surreal opening immediately establishes its themes. Petkovic commended Miroslav Terzić's artistic direction, writing that although Vladimir Arsenijević's screenplay is structurally straightforward and issue-driven, the director approaches it with "a very artistic, clearly defined sensibility." Petkovic also praised Damjan Radovanović's cinematography, the unsettling sound design and LP Duo's tension-filled electronic score for creating an atmosphere of psychological dread. He praised the performances of the young cast, particularly Jovan Ginić as the emotionally fragile Tzotza. Concluding the review he wrote that the film raises complex questions about individual and collective responsibility, suggesting that its moral ambiguities are likely to "provoke divided reactions" among audiences.

== Accolades ==
Award	Date of ceremony	Category	Recipient(s)	Result	Ref
Karlovy Vary International Film Festival	11 July 2026	Crystal Globe Grand Prix	3 Weeks After	Nominated	
Karlovy Vary International Film Festival	11 July 2026	Europa Cinemas Label Award	3 Weeks After	Won	
Pula Film Festival	16 July 2026	Golden Arena – Best Croatian Minority Coproduction	Ines Vasiljevic	Nominated	
Pula Film Festival	16 July 2026	Golden Arena – Best Direction Croatian Minority Coproduction	Miša Terzić	Won	
Pula Film Festival	16 July 2026	Golden Arena – Best Editing Croatian Minority Coproduction	Marko Ferković	Won	
Pula Film Festival	16 July 2026	Golden Arena – Best Screenplay Croatian Minority Coproduction	Vladimir Arsenijević, Miroslav Terzić, and Bojan Vuletić	Won	
