= Only Beautiful Things to Look At =

2026 Czech drama film

- Theatrical release poster
- Czech: Prameň
- Directed by: Ivan Ostrochovský
- Screenplay by: Ivan Ostrochovský; Marek Leščák
- Produced by: Ivan Ostrochovský; Albert Malinovský; Katarína Tomková
- Starring: Anna Geislerová; Simona Boledovičová; Eva Mores; Vlad Ivanov; Éva Bandor; Attila Mokos
- Cinematography: Juraj Chlpík
- Edited by: Josef Krajbich; Martin Malo
- Music by: Michal Novinski
- Production companies: Punkchart Films; Negativ Film Productions; Proton Cinema; Rozhlas a televízia Slovenska - Radio and Television Slovakia; Czech Television - Česká televize
- Distributed by: Aerofilms
- Release dates: 5 July 2026 (KVIFF); 16 July 2026 (Czech Republic)
- Running time: 88 minutes
- Countries: Czech Republic; Slovakia; Hungary
- Language: Czech
- Box office: US$89,908

Only Beautiful Things to Look At (Czech: Prameň) is a 2026 drama film co-written and directed by Ivan Ostrochovský. Starring Anna Geislerová, the film's plot is inspired by real events related to the reproductive policy of communist Czechoslovakia. The forced sterilization of Romani women, carried out without their informed consent, constituted a gross violation of human rights.

The film, a co-production between Czech Republic, Slovakia and Hungary premiered at 60th Karlovy Vary International Film Festival on 5 July 2026, where it was nominated for the Crystal Globe and won the FIPRESCI Award.

== Synopsis ==
In the 1980s, Ingrid, an accomplished doctor trapped in a stagnant life, routinely performs reproductive procedures—including involuntary sterilizations of Romani women—without reflecting on their consequences. Her friendship with Agáta, a younger colleague prompts her to reconsider the system she has long accepted. The film examines a fraught period in Czechoslovakia when state policy shaped citizens’ reproductive rights.

== Cast ==
- Anna Geislerová as Ingrid
- Simona Boledovičová as Agáta
- Eva Mores
- Vlad Ivanov
- Éva Bandor
- Attila Mokos

== Production ==
In February 2022, the producers presented the project at the Berlinale Co-Production Market seeking additional co‑producers, financing partners, international sales representation, and both television and pre‑sales collaborators.

== Release ==
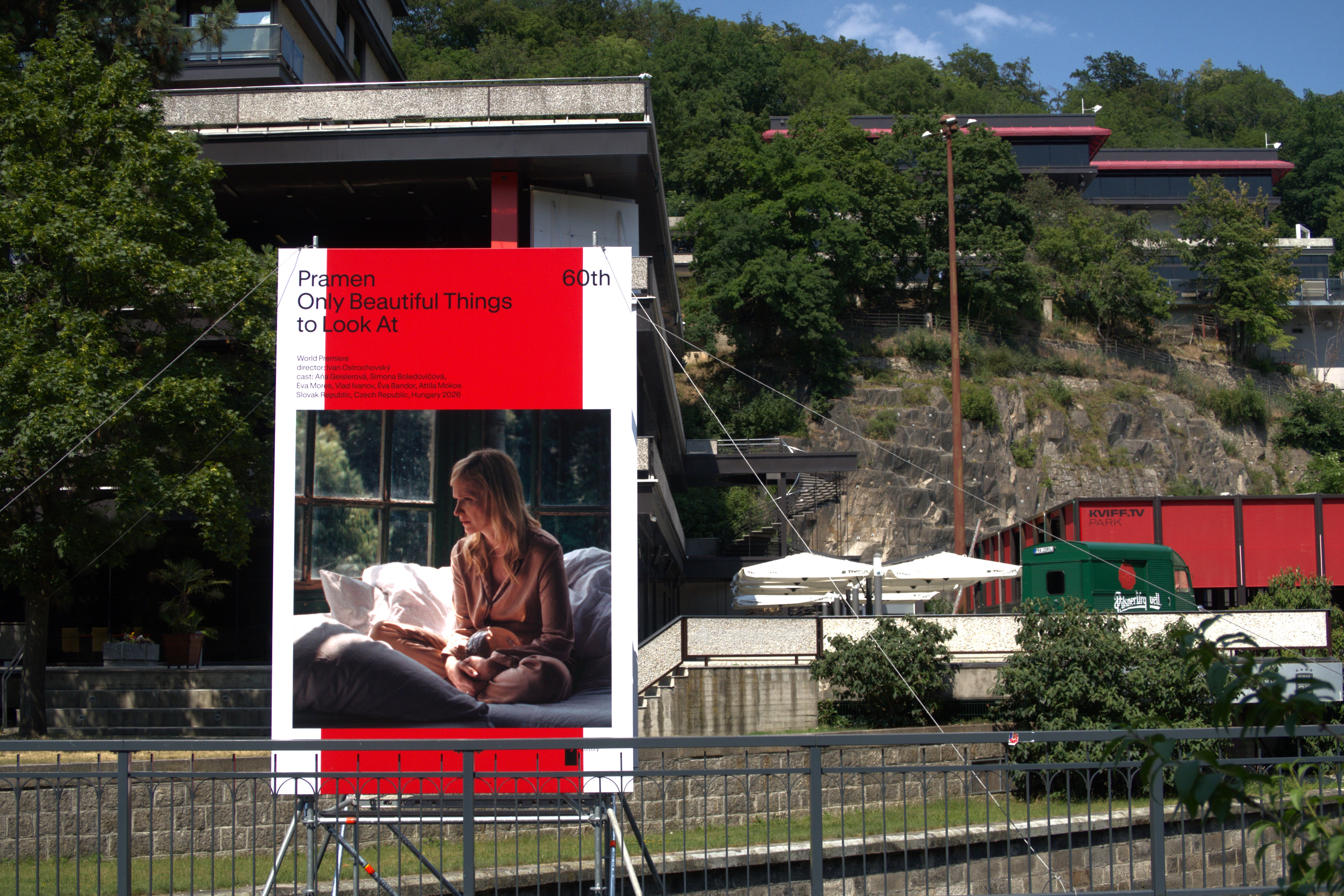
Promotion of the film at the 60th Karlovy Vary International Film Festival

Only Beautiful Things to Look At had its world premiere at the 60th Karlovy Vary International Film Festival on 5 July 2026 in Crystal Globe Competition.

The film was theatrically released in Czech Republic on 16 July 2026 by Aerofilms.

The film was released in Slovakian theatres on 30 July 2025.

It will be in European Competition at the Arras Film Festival in the fortnight of November 2026.

== Reception ==
=== Critical response ===
Reviewing for Cineuropa, Olivia Popp wrote that the film opens with dark, natural imagery and a droning, eerie score. These elements don’t fully become metaphors, but they give the story a distinctive, unsettling mood. Popp observed that the narrative shows Ingrid struggling with a power imbalance she cannot fully see. Popp concluded that Her late realisation of her role in harmful medical practices may feel unearned, but her eventual act of resistance brings a gentle emotional payoff, which is "warm and welcome."

=== Box office ===
The film was released in 86 theaters across the Czech Republic and in Slovakia in 6 theaters on 16 July and 30 July 2026 respectively. It opened with US$20,335 in Czech Republic.

As of 2 August 2026, it grossed a total of US$89,908 worldwide, including US$62,870 in the Czech Republic and US$27,038 in Slovakia.

== Accolades ==
The film was shortlisted for a nomination at the 39th European Film Awards in the Feature Film category.

Award	Date of ceremony	Category	Recipient(s)	Result	Ref
Karlovy Vary International Film Festival	11 July 2026	Crystal Globe Grand Prix	Only Beautiful Things to Look At	Nominated	
Karlovy Vary International Film Festival	11 July 2026	FIPRESCI Award	Only Beautiful Things to Look At	Won	
