= LP Duo =

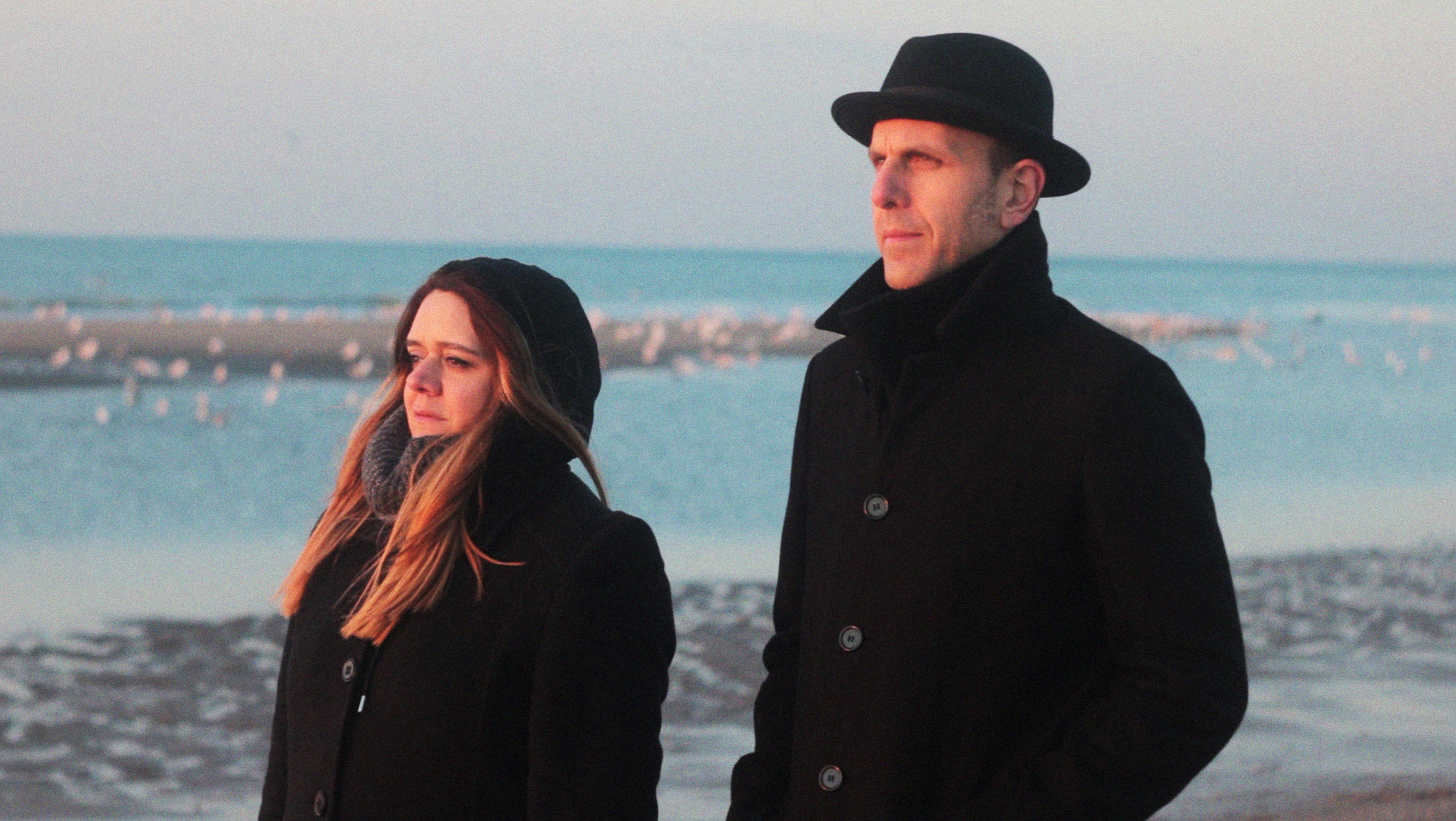
- LP Duo in 2024 (photo: Laszlo Antal)

Background information
- Origin: Belgrade, Serbia
- Genres: Neo Classical Piano Music; Electronic
- Years active: 2004–present
- Labels: Universal Music; Donemus; New Art Center; Sweet Sensation
- Website: www.lpduo.com

LP Duo is a piano and electronic duo whose members are pianists, composers, and innovators Sonja Lončar and Andrija Pavlović based between Amsterdam and Belgrade. Formed as a traditional chamber ensemble performing classical music, the duo is now active in the fields of electronic, avant-garde, film, television, theater and popular music, both as performers and composers. More recently, LP Duo has been particularly involved with Quantum Music, an experimental genre that seeks to explore the connections between quantum physics and music.

== History ==
The duo was formed in 2004 while Sonja Lončar and Andrija Pavlović studied at the piano department of the Faculty of Music in Belgrade, where they earned degrees in piano performance. The two then went on to study at the Rostock University of Music and Theatre. During this formative period, LP Duo performed a classical repertoire, including works of composers such as Johann Sebastian Bach and Wolfgang Amadeus Mozart, as well as avant-garde works by John Cage, Karlheinz Stockhausen, and Olivier Messiaen.

They were also greatly influenced by various popular genres, most notably trip hop and punk, and performers such as Kate Bush, Massive Attack, Portishead and Tricky, who inspired them to embark on an exploration of electronic music.

Since the mid-2000s, Lončar and Pavlović have performed frequently, both as a duo and individually, as soloists, and with renowned orchestras, such as the Belgrade Philharmonic Orchestra, the Symphony Orchestra of the Radio Television of Serbia and the Orchestra of the National Theater in Belgrade.

LP Duo often premieres compositions by avant-garde composers, many of whom have dedicated their works to the duo. These are mostly Serbian composers (Ivan Božičević, Miloš Raičković, Milimir Drašković, Miroslav Savić, Ana Sokolović) but also Danish composer Kim Helweg.

LP Duo has released twelve standalone albums and participated in several other releases. Their albums are published by Universal Music, Donemus (Netherlands), Helikon Records (Copenhagen), and Sweet Sensation labels.

The duo has composed music for a couple of television series, including Žigosani u reketu by Dragan Bjelogrlić, Dug moru by Goran Gajić, Jutro će promeniti sve by Goran Stanković and Vladimir Tagić, and Deca zla by Ivan Stefanović and Vladimir Tagić.

In early 2020, the duo, in collaboration with the American company HTEC, began developing the Duality Portable Hybrid Piano System. This system, featuring 88 optical sensors, transforms any piano into a hybrid acoustic-electronic instrument. It connects via USB to digital devices, allowing integration with music software and VST instruments. The Duality system can be easily assembled on any piano without requiring physical alterations, offering numerous sound possibilities while maintaining acoustic qualities. The prototype of the hybrid piano was premiered in 2017 in Singapore, and its patent is internationally protected.

LP Duo premiered new compositions for two Duality hybrid pianos as part of the Beyond Quantum Music project during their residency at the Kavli Institute at TU Delft. These works incorporated sounds from quantum computers, atomic manipulations, and genetic code. After their performance at TU Delft, LP Duo performed the Beyond Quantum Music project in several European cities, with the main performance at the Ars Electronica Festival in Linz. Belgrade media artist Incredible Bob created the visual aspect of the performance.

== Featured activities ==
=== Theater, television and film music ===
LP Duo is very active in the fields of theater and visual arts. They have composed and performed music for theaters Atelje 212, National Theater in Belgrade, Yugoslav Drama Theater, Belgrade International Theatre Festival, Pinokio Puppet Theater, Duško Radović Theater, National Theatre Sombor, National Theatre Kikinda, Celje City Theatre and others.They have written music for plays, such as "Junaci doba krize" ("Heroes of the Age of Crisis", performed in "Atelje 212") and "Ples u vodi" ("Dance in the Water", performed in "Belgrade Drama Theater").

=== Quantum Music and Hybrid Piano ===
Since 2012, LP Duo has been one of the key promoters of the Quantum Music concept. The Quantum Music project began with the reunion of two high school friends: one of the world's most famous quantum physicists, Vlatko Vedral (University of Oxford), and engineer and acoustician Dragan Novković, with the support of the Institute of Musicology of the Serbian Academy of Sciences and Arts, while the financing was provided by the Creative Europe program of the European Union.

Quantum physicists Andrew Garner and Klaus Molmer and composer Kim Helweg who joined the project at the invitation of LP Duo, also contributed to the project, as well as musicologist Ivana Medić, who is also the project coordinator. At the same time, LP Duo are the lead artists and composers. In the preparatory phase, the duo members, together with engineers Dragan Novković and Darko Lazović, worked on the development of a special keyboard instrument, the so-called hybrid piano, which allows any existing acoustic piano to be connected to a computer. Thus LP Duo created a brand new instrument that combines piano and synthesizer sound; when performing individual tracks within the multimedia concert Quantum Music, they used sound samples based on algorithms, equations, and quantum physics formulas. During the project implementation phase, the duo toured numerous European and global cities, such as Singapore, The Hague, Ljubljana, Aarhus and Copenhagen.

In the mid-2010s, the duo (in collaboration with the American company HTEC) also developed the so-called Hybrid portable piano, a system featuring 88 optical sensors that can transform any piano into a hybrid acoustic-electronic instrument. It connects via USB to digital devices, allowing integration with music software and VST instruments. Duality can be easily assembled on any piano without physical alterations, offering numerous sound possibilities while maintaining acoustic qualities. It was first premiered in 2017, and its patent is internationally protected. Thanks to the invention of the new hybrid piano sound, LP Duo has composed an album of original music called "Duality" (2019), released with Universal Music, which promotes the album in collaboration with Deutsche Grammophon, Yellow Lounge and IMG Artists at concerts across Europe, North America and Asia.

LP Duo premiered new compositions for two hybrid pianos as part of the Beyond Quantum Music project during their residency at the Kavli Institute at TU Delft. These works incorporated sounds from quantum computers, atomic manipulations, and genetic code translations, blending them with their established musical style. They performed on the Duality Hybrid Piano, which was developed in collaboration with HTEC engineers. Belgrade media artist Incredible Bob created the visual aspect of the performance.

In 2022, LP Duo composed Baby Blues, six short minimalistic hybrid-piano pieces (Birth, Cradle, Now What?, Baby’s Book, Show Me How to Breathe, Lullaby for Staying Awake).

In 2023, the ensemble created a composition Between the Waves, on the occasion of the Ars Akustika EBU, a live broadcast organized by Radio Belgrade 3 in collaboration with the European Broadcasting Union (EBU). The event features avant-garde and experimental acoustic art, combining live performances, installations, and sound pieces from artists worldwide.

=== LP Elektro ===
LP Elektro can be seen as the alter ego of LP Duo; it emerged due to more than two decades of collaboration between the duo members and various rock and pop bands. LP Elektro combines different types of synthesizers, sophisticated electronic sounds, and a wealth of rhythms with conceptual and love lyrics. Under this brand, LP Elektro released the album We Have To Talk (2019).

=== Konstrakta ===
In 2024, they were guests at Konstrakta's Sava centar concert.

== Discography and filmography ==
=== Albums ===
==== As LP Duo ====
- LP Duo Plays Works For Two Pianos By Kim Helweg, Helikon Records, 2012.
- Belgrade New Classics For Two Pianos (LP Duo Plays Composers From Belgrade), New Art Center, 2013.
- Mechanical Destruction, Analogue Synth Symphony (LP Duo Plays Correa, Helweg, Mellits, Ligeti on Analogue Synths), New Art Center, 2016.
- LP Duo Plays Music by the Composers From Serbia For Two Pianos, New Art Center, 2017.
- A Place Of Coolness (LP Duo Plays Chiel Meijering), Donemus and New Art Center, 2017.
- Duality, Universal Music Serbia, 2019.
- Duality (Unplugged), Universal Music Serbia, 2020
- LP Duo Plays Božičević, Universal Music Croatia, 2021.
- Dead Sea, LP Duo, under exclusive license to Universal Music Serbia, 2022.
- Deca Zla (Music from the Original TV Series), Sweet Sensation, 2024.
- LP Duo plays Canto Ostinato by Simeon Ten Holt Donemus and Sweet Sensation, 2024.

==== As LP Elektro ====
- We Have To Talk, Universal Music Serbia, 2019.

==== Other ====
- Ivo Josipović, Ivana Stefanović, Composers’ Dialogue (composition "Dernek For Two Pianos Or Two Harpsichords, Percussion And Strings"), Cantus, 2009 – Listed as Andrija Pavlović and Sonja Lončar, in ensemble with Ivan Marjanović and Ivana Bilić. Composed by Ivo Josipović.

=== Series ===
- Žigosani u reketu, 2018
- Jutro će promeniti sve, 2018
- Dug moru, 2019
- Deca zla, 2023

=== Movies ===
- Ederlezi Rising [A.I. Rising], 2018

=== Theater ===
- Play Čista kuća, 2022
- Play Tvoje i moje, 2024
