= 60th Karlovy Vary International Film Festival =

Film festival in Czech Republic

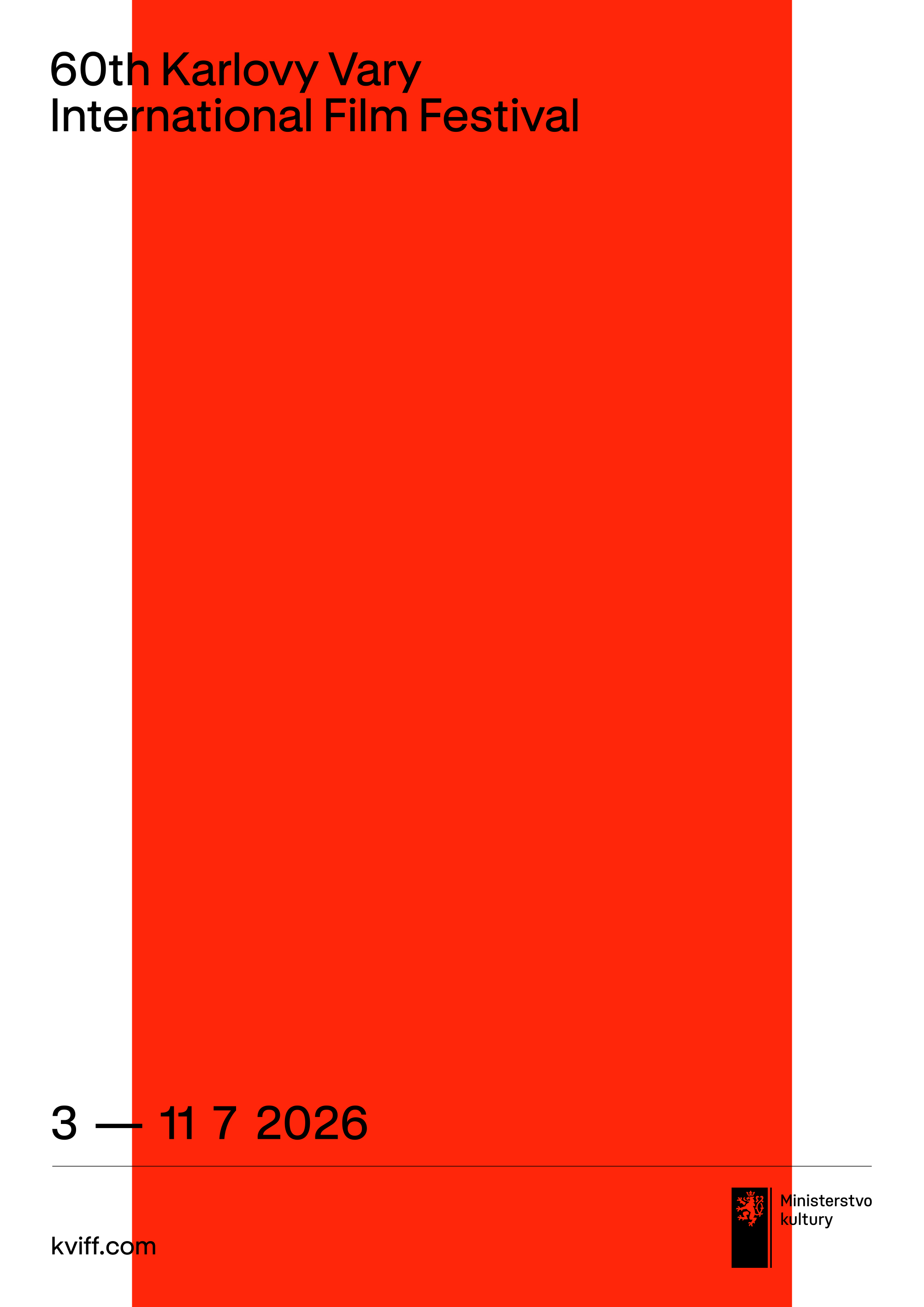
- Official poster
- Opening film: The Match
- Closing film: The Only Living Pickpocket in New York
- Location: Karlovy Vary, Czech Republic
- Founded: 1946
- Awards: Crystal Globe: Fruit Gathering
- Artistic director: Karel Och
- No. of films: 179
- Festival date: Opening: 3 July 2026; Closing: 11 July 2026
- Website: www.kviff.com/en/homepage

Karlovy Vary International Film Festival
- 61st 59th

The 60th Karlovy Vary International Film Festival opened on 3 July 2026, in Karlovy Vary, Czech Republic with an Argentinian sports documentary film The Match, written and directed by Juan Cabral and Santiago Franco, the film reconstructs the historic match Argentina vs England at the 1986 FIFA World Cup quarter-finals.

In the opening ceremony, the Crystal Globe for Outstanding Artistic Contribution to World Cinema was presented to Dustin Hoffman and American actress and filmmaker Maggie Gyllenhaal received the Festival President's Award for her outstanding contribution to the cinema.

The festival, which commemorated two milestones: 80 years since the first festival, and the festival’s 60th edition, concluded on 11 July with screening of closing film The Only Living Pickpocket in New York, 2026 American crime thriller film written and directed by Noah Segan and the presentation of awards in both non-statutory and main competition categories. Fruit Gathering, a Myanmar, Czech Republic and France co-production, directed by Aung Phyoe, received the Crystal Globe, while Lover, Not a Fighter, a co-production of Slovak Republic–Czech Republic directed by Martina Buchelová, was awarded the PROXIMA Grand Prix. It wrapped up after showcasing 179 films across 472 screenings. The lineup featured 119 fiction features, 21 documentaries, and 39 short films. Out of these, 43 had their world premiere, and 7 had their first screening in Europe.

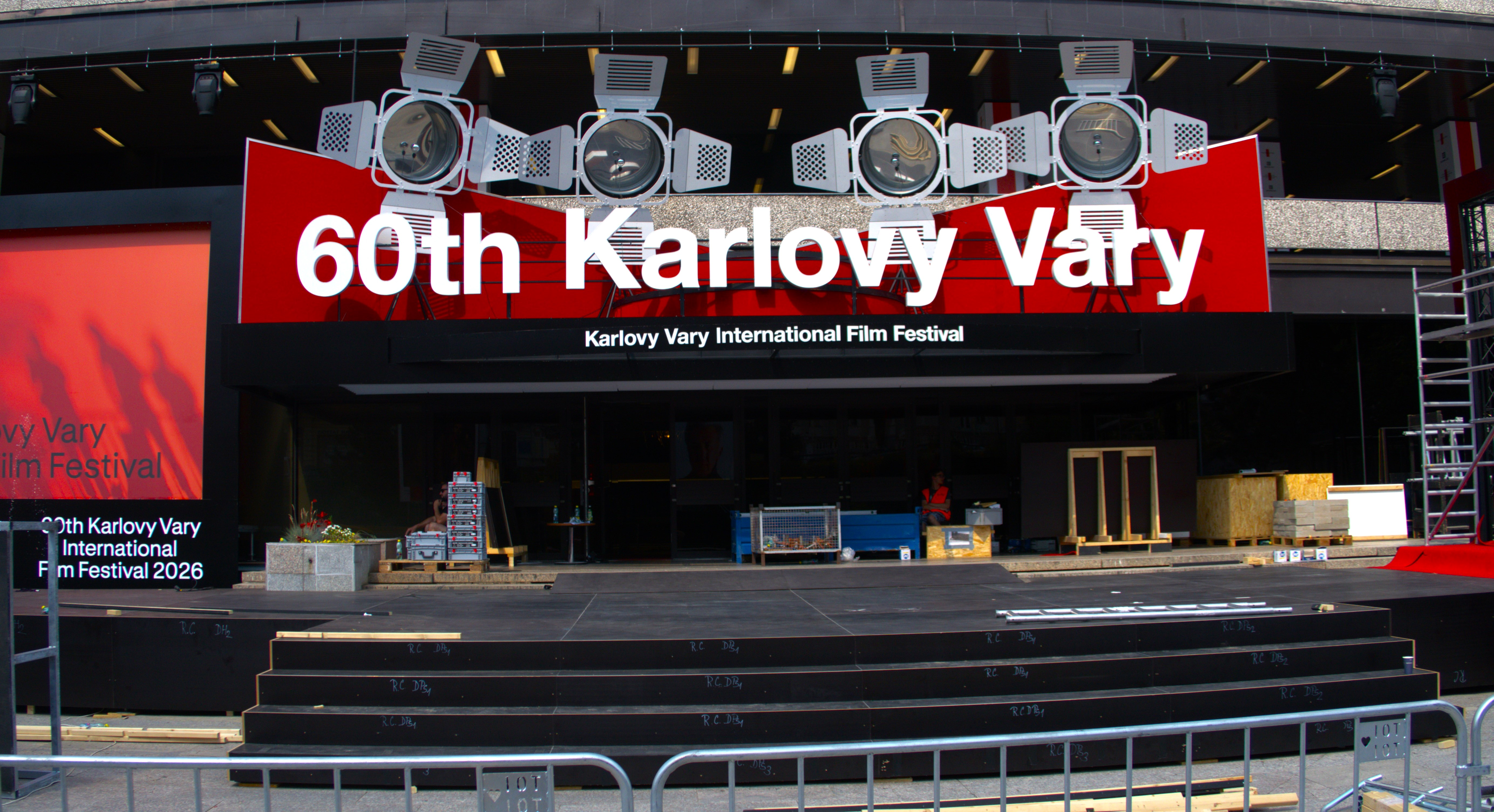
60th Karlovy Vary International Film Festival

== Opening and closing ceremony ==
The festival closed by midnight screenings of the following films:

=== Opening ceremony ===
The festival's opening ceremony was held on 3 July in the Grand Hall of the Thermal Hotel. It was streamed live on KVIFF.TV. The 70-minute ceremony opened with a band playing Happy Birthday and sparklers shooting into the auditorium, followed by Czech versions of pop and rock classics celebrating the festival’s 60th edition and its 80‑year history. In addition to Dustin Hoffman and Maggie Gyllenhaal the awards recipients, Jesse Eisenberg, Harvey Keitel, and Gyllenhaal’s husband Peter Sarsgaard attended the ceremony.

=== Closing ceremony ===
The festival closing ceremony hosted by Marek Eben was attended by Klára Issová, Denisa Barešová, Alžběta Malá, Bolek Polívka, singer Bára Basiková, and director Helena Třeštíková. Crystal Globe for Outstanding Artistic Contribution to World Cinema was awarded to the French actress Juliette Binoche and President's Award to former Czechoslovak actress Magda Vášáryová, and American actor Jeffrey Wright.

== Juries ==
The jury for Crystal Globe Competition and Proxima Competition was announced on 2 June 2026.

=== Crystal Globe Competition ===
- Justin Chang, American film critic and columnist currently working at The New Yorker
- Amanda Nell Eu, Malaysian film director and screenwriter
- Pavel Rejholec, Czech sound designer, producer, composer, and educator
- Nadia Turincev, producer Rouge International, Easy Riders Films, Sento Films
- Eskil Vogt, Norwegian film director and screenwriter

=== Proxima Competition Jury ===
- Estrella Araiza, the General Director of the Guadalajara International Film Festival (FICG) and Cineteca UDG
- Dirk Decker, German producer
- Jakub Felcman, Czech screenwriter, festival organizer, film critic, creative producer, and director
- Devika Girish, New York City-based film critic and curator
- Marija Kavtaradzė, Lithuanian film director and screenwriter

== Official selection ==
On 23 June 2026, the full line up, opening and closing film along with the names of the awards recipients were revealed.

The festival has following sections:

- Crystal Globe
- Proxima Competition
- Special Screenings
- Horizons
- Imagina
- Tributes

=== Crystal Globe ===
On 2 June, the festival revealed 12 films selected for its main Crystal Globe Competition, all world premiere titles from Central and Eastern Europe, Latin America and Asia.

Highlighted title and double-dagger (‡) indicates Crystal Globe winner.
Highlighted title and double-dagger (‡) indicates Special Jury Prize winner.

English title	Original title	Director(s)	Production countrie(s)
3 Weeks After	3 nedelje posle	Miroslav Terzić	Serbia, Bulgaria, Italy, Croatia, Luxembourg
Behind the Rain		Valeria Sarmiento	Chile
Black Money for White Nights	Черни пари за бели нощи	Petar Valchanov, and Kristina Grozeva	Bulgaria, Greece
Chica Checa		Šimon Holý	Czech Republic, France, Slovakia
Five Years, Four Months		Esteban Hoyos García, Juan Miguel Gelacio Ramírez	Colombia, USA
Fruit Gathering‡	သစ်သီးခူး	Aung Phyoe	Myanmar, Czech Republic, France
The Guest‡	Gæsten	Mads Mengel	Denmark
A Happy Family		Jan-Eric Mack	Switzerland
Hijamat		Nader Saeivar	Germany
The Lion at My Back		Tonia Mishiali	Cyprus, Luxembourg, Greece
Only Beautiful Things to Look At	Prameň	Ivan Ostrochovský	Czech Republic, Slovakia, Hungary
Pipes		Karim Kassem	Lebanon

=== Proxima Competition ===
Highlighted title and double-dagger (‡) indicates Proxima Competition winner.

English title	Original title	Director(s)	Production countrie(s)
33 Steps	33 kroků	Anna Domček, Šimon Domček	Slovak Republic, Czech Republic
Against Nature	Contra la Naturaleza	Axel Bertha	Mexico
Lover, Not a Fighter	Milovník, nie bojovník	Martina Buchelová	Slovakia, Czech Republic
Truck Driver	Camionero	Francisco Marise	Spain, Argentina
A Whole Person Almost	Enas olokliros anthropos schedon	Efthimis Kosemund-Sanidis	Greece, Bulgaria, Germany, Cyprus, Romania
Homo Sive Natura		Giovanni C. Lorusso	Italy
The Ink-Stained Hand and the Missing Thumb		Yashasvi Juyal	India
My Friend the Porn Star	Mein Freund der Pornostar	Rosa Friedrich	Austria
Paris Paris		Isabelle Tollenaere	Belgium
Rain Catcher		Michele Fiascaris	Italy, United Kingdom
Incinerator	Shokyakuro	Shuntaro Uchida	Japan
Petty Thieves	Sitni lopovi	Mate Ugrin	Croatia, Germany, France

=== Special Screenings ===
English title	Original title	Director(s)	Production countrie(s)
Bára – Diary of a Rockstar	Bára Basiková	Helena Třeštíková	Czech Republic
City of Fathers	Město otců	Zdeněk Tyc	Czech Republic, Slovak Republic, Poland
The Cursed Warrior	Bojovník	Vojtěch Frič, Tomáš Dianiška	Czech Republic, Slovak Republic
Filter		David Semler	Czech Republic
A Pint of Ink	Dvě deci tuše	Ester Geislerová	Czech Republic, Slovak Republic
If Pigeons Turned to Gold	Kdyby se holubi proměnili ve zlato	Pepa Lubojacki	Czech Republic, Slovak Republic
The Friend’s House Is Here	Khaneh doost injast	Maryam Ataei, Hossein Keshavarz	Iran, United States
Learning to Breathe Underwater		Rebekah Fortune	United Kingdom, Netherlands, Ireland
Everything As It Should Be	Mistryně	Bohdan Karásek	Czech Republic
Morten		Ivan Pavljutskov	Estonia, Lithuania
Robert Richardson: The White Devil		Jana Hojdová	Czech Republic, United States
The Story of Documentary Film – 1980s		Mark Cousins	United Kingdom
To Die to Live		Yuliia Hontaruk	Ukraine, Latvia, Slovak Republic
Gregorius, the Chosen One	Vyvolený	Tomasz Mielnik	Czech Republic, Poland, Romania
A Report for Minerva 2	Zpráva pro Minervu 2	Miroslav Krobot, Lubomír Smékal	Czech Republic

=== Horizons ===
English title	Original title	Director(s)	Production countrie(s)
All of a Sudden	Soudain / 急に具合が悪くなる	Ryusuke Hamaguchi	France, Japan, Germany, Belgium
Animol		Ashley Walters	United Kingdom
A Man of His Time	Notre Salut	Emmanuel Marre	Belgium, France
The Beloved	El ser querido	Rodrigo Sorogoyen	Spain, France
Ben'Imana		Marie Clémentine Dusabejambo	Rwanda, Gabon, France, Norway, Ivory Coast
Bitter Christmas	Amarga Navidad	Pedro Almodóvar	Spain
Cantona		David Tryhorn and Ben Nicholas	United Kingdom
Coward		Lukas Dhont	Belgium, France, Netherlands
Dao		Alain Gomis	France, Guinea-Bissau, Senegal
The Dreamed Adventure	Das Geträumte Abenteuer	Valeska Grisebach	Germany, France, Austria, Bulgaria
Elephants in the Fog	तिनीहरू	Abinash Bikram Shah	Nepal, France, Germany, Brazil, Norway
Everybody Digs Bill Evans		Grant Gee	Ireland, United Kingdom
Everytime		Sandra Wollner	Austria, Germany
Fatherland	Vaterland	Paweł Pawlikowski	Poland, France, Italy, Germany
Filipiñana		Rafael Manuel	Singapore, United Kingdom, Philippines, France, Netherlands
Fjord		Cristian Mungiu	Romania, Norway, Denmark, Finland, France, Sweden
Flies	Moscas	Fernando Eimbcke	Mexico
Forest High	Forêt Ivre	Manon Coubia	Belgium, France
Forever Your Maternal Animal	Siempre soy tu animal materno	Valentina Maurel	Belgium, France, Mexico
Gentle Monster		Marie Kreutzer	Austria, France, Germany
The History of Concrete		John Wilson	United States
Hold onto Me	Κράτα Με	Myrsini Aristidou	Cyprus, Denmark, Greece
The Holy Boy	La Valle dei Sorrisi	Paolo Strippoli	Italy, Slovenia
How to Divorce During the War	Skyrybos karo metu	Andrius Blaževičius	Lithuania, Luxembourg, Ireland, Czech Republic
La Gradiva		Marine Atlan	France, Italy
La Perra		Dominga Sotomayor	Chile, Brazil
The Last First: Winter K2		Amir Bar-Lev	United Kingdom, United States
Light Pillar	寒夜灯柱	Zao Xu	China
The Man I Love		Ira Sachs	United States, France
The Match (Opening film)	El partido	Juan Cabral and Santiago Franco	Argentina
The Only Living Pickpocket in New York (Closing film)		Noah Segan	United States
Papaya		Priscilla Kellen	Brazil
Paper Tiger		James Gray	United States, Brazil
Queen at Sea		Lance Hammer	United Kingdom, United States
Rehearsals for a Revolution	خاطرات ایران	Pegah Ahangarani	Iran, Czech Republic, Spain
Rose		Markus Schleinzer	Austria, Germany
A Sad and Beautiful World	نجوم الأمل و الألم	Cyril Aris	Lebanon, United States, Germany, Saudi Arabia, Qatar
Shame and Money		Visar Morina	Germany, Kosovo, Slovenia, Albania, North Macedonia, Belgium
Silent Friend	Stille Freundin	Ildikó Enyedi	Germany, France, Hungary
The Souffleur		Gastón Solnicki	Austria, Argentina
The Station	المحطّة	Sara Ishaq	Yemen, Jordan, France, Germany, Netherlands, Norway, Qatar
Strange River	Estrany riu	Jaume Claret Muxart	Spain, Germany
Two Mountains Weighing Down My Chest	东山飘雨西山晴	Viv Li	Germany, Netherlands
The Unknown	L'Inconnue	Arthur Harari	France, Italy
Viva Carmen	Carmen, l'Oiseau Rebel	Sebastien Laundenbach	France, Finland, Spain
A Woman's Life	La Vie d'une Femme	Charline Bourgeois-Tacquet	France, Belgium
Yellow Letters	Gelbe Briefe	İlker Çatak	Germany, France, Turkey
Yesterday the Eye Didn't Sleep	البارح العين ما نامت	Rakan Mayasi	Belgium, Lebanon, Palestine, Qatar, Saudi Arabia

=== Imagina ===
English title	Original title	Director(s)	Production countrie(s)
Black Seas		Erin Weisgerber	Canada
Diorama of Venice	Venezia Diorama	Nicolas Piret	Belgium
Disappearance		Sohrab Hura	India, Nepal
Two Pids		John Smith	United Kingdom
Double Freedom	La libertad doble	Lisandro Alonso	Chile, Argentina, Luxembourg, Germany, United Kingdom
Stallion and a Crystal Ball	Stallion y la Bola de Cristal	Christian Avilés	Spain
El León		Diana Bustamante	Colombia
Tycoon		Charlotte Zhang	Canada, USA
My Wife Cries	Meine Frau weint	Angela Schanelec	Germany, France
Last night I stayed within myself and this morning I decided to live here	Vannacht logeerde ik in mijzelf en vanochtend besloot ik er te blijven wonen	Fé Baan	Netherlands
Exvotos		Alejandro Aguilar Escamilla	Mexico, Poland
The Recce		Daniel Mann	United Kingdom, Germany
Olivia		Sofía Petersen	Argentina, United Kingdom, Spain
Because I Have To	Podoby milostného vztahu ke světu	Jakub Kučera	Czech Republic
Rojo Žalia Blau		Viktoria Schmid	Austria
Levers		Rhayne Vermette	Canada
Roses of Nevada		Mark Jenkin	United Kingdom
With a Kind Regard		Pavel Mozhar	Germany
Volklore		Viktorie Štěpánová	Czech Republic

=== Out of the Past – KVIFF 60/80 ===
English title	Original title	Director(s)	Production countrie(s)
Birds, Orphans and Fools (1969)	Vtáčkovia, siroty a blázni	Juraj Jakubisko	Czechoslovakia
Blood on the Land (1966)	Το χώμα βάφτηκε κόκκινο	Vasilis Georgiadis	Greece
Captain Thunderbolt (1952)		Cecil Holmes	Australia
A Matter of Life and Death (1946)		Michael Powell and Emeric Pressburger	United Kingdom

=== Tributes ===
English title	Original title	Director(s)	Production countrie(s)
Basquiat (1996)		Julian Schnabel	United States
The Bride! (2026)		Maggie Gyllenhaal	United States, France
Certified Copy (2010)	Copie conforme	Abbas Kiarostami	France, Italy, Belgium
The Double (2013)		Richard Ayoade	United Kingdom
The Graduate (1967)		Mike Nichols	United States
Mean Streets (1973)		Martin Scorsese	United States
The Order		Justin Kurzel	Canada, United States
Three Colours: Blue (1993)		Krzysztof Kieślowski	France, Poland, Switzerland

== Awards ==
=== Crystal Globe Competition ===
Following awards were announced at the closing ceremony of the festival:

- Grand Prix – Crystal Globe: Fruit Gathering – Aung Phyoe
- Special Jury Prize: The Guest – Mads Mengel
- Best Director Award:
  - Mads Mengel – The Guest
- Best Actress Award: Anna Schinz – A Happy Family
- Best Actor Award: Ghassan Saad – Pipes

=== Awards for films in the Proxima Competition ===
The following awards were presented:

- PROXIMA Grand Prix: Lover, Not a Fighter – Martina Buchelová
- PROXIMA Special Jury Mention: Incinerator – Shuntaro Uchida
- Special Mention: 33 Steps – Anna Domček, Šimon Domček
- Proxima Best Director Award: Efthimis Kosemund-Sanidis for A Whole Person Almost
- Právo Audience Award: Bára – Diary of a Rockstar – Helena Třeštíková

=== Non-statutory awards ===
Non-statutory awards were announced in the evening of 11 July.

- Prize of the Ecumenical Jury: The Lion at My Back – Tonia Mishiali
- Europa Cinemas Label Award: 3 Weeks After (3 nedelje posle) – Miroslav Terzić
- FIPRESCI Award for Crystal Globe Competition: Only Beautiful Things to Look At (Prameň) – Ivan Ostrochovský
- FIPRESCI Award for PROXIMA Competition: Petty Thieves (Zlodějíčci) – Mate Ugrin

=== Other awards ===
- Crystal Globe for Outstanding Artistic Contribution to World Cinema:

The award was awarded to Dustin Hoffman, Juliette Binoche, and Robert Richardson.

  - Dustin Hoffman

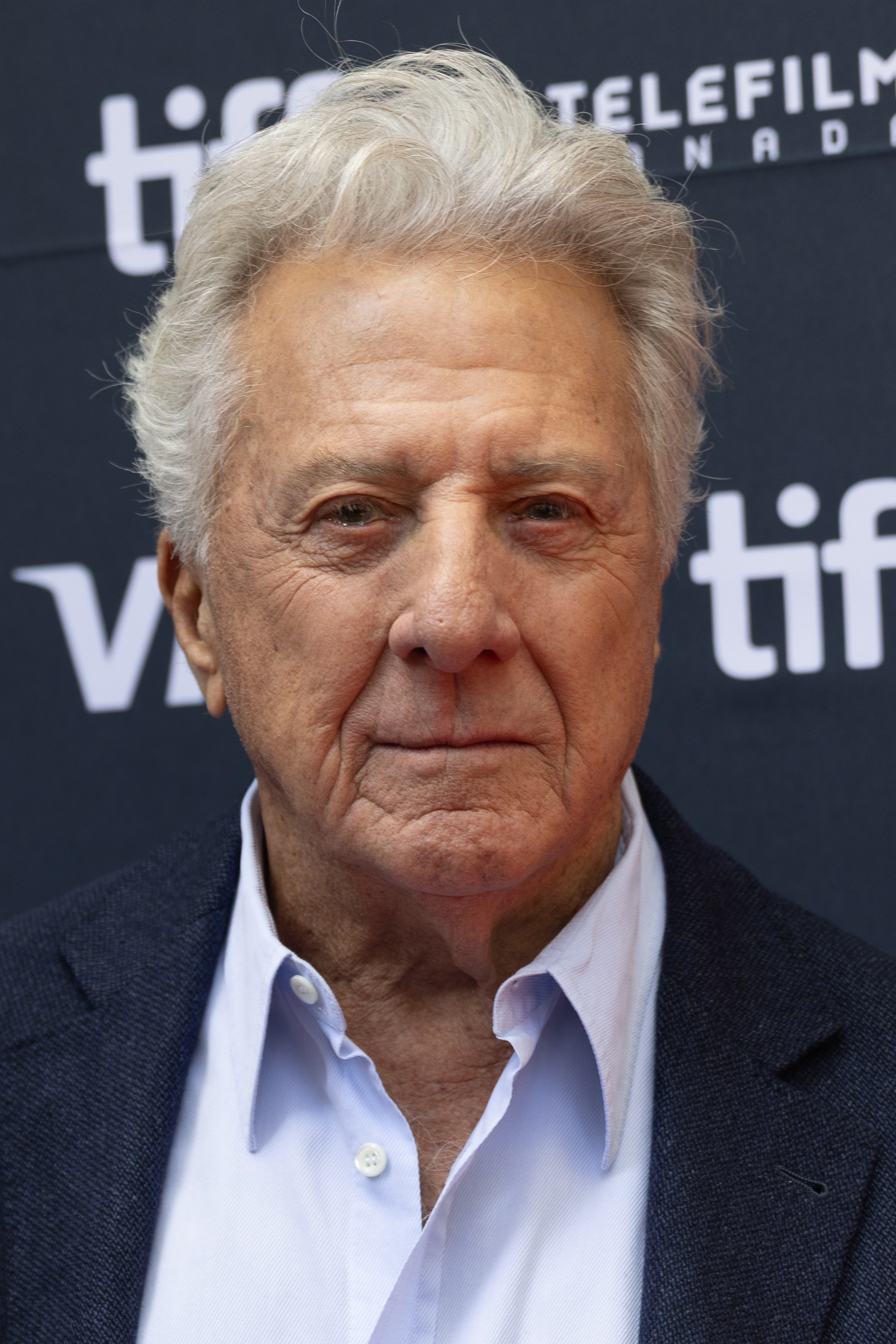
Dustin Hoffman, co-recipient of Crystal Globe for Outstanding Artistic Contribution to World Cinema

  - Juliette Binoche, French actress

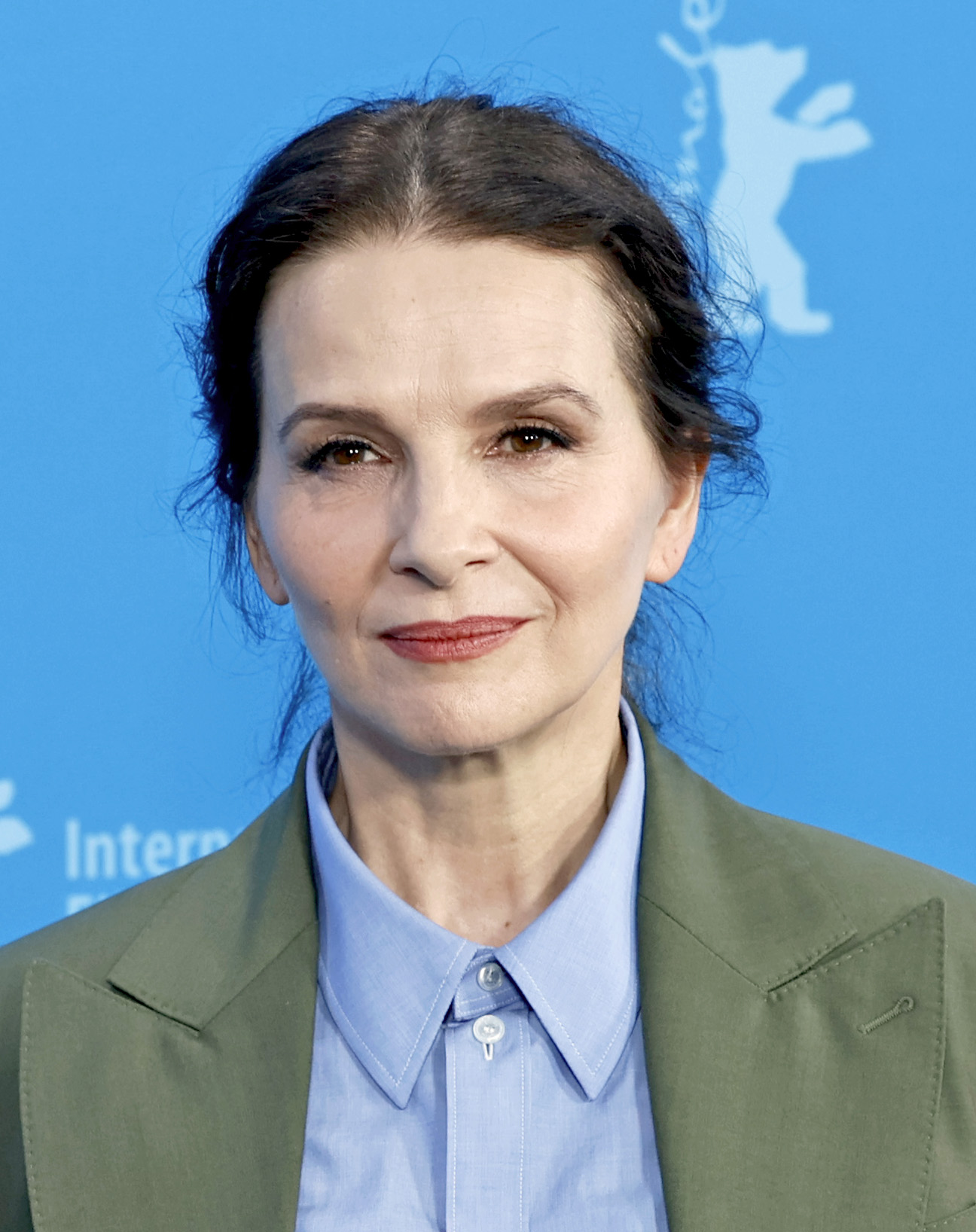
Juliette Binoche, co-recipient of Crystal Globe for Outstanding Artistic Contribution to World Cinema

  - Robert Richardson, American cinematographer

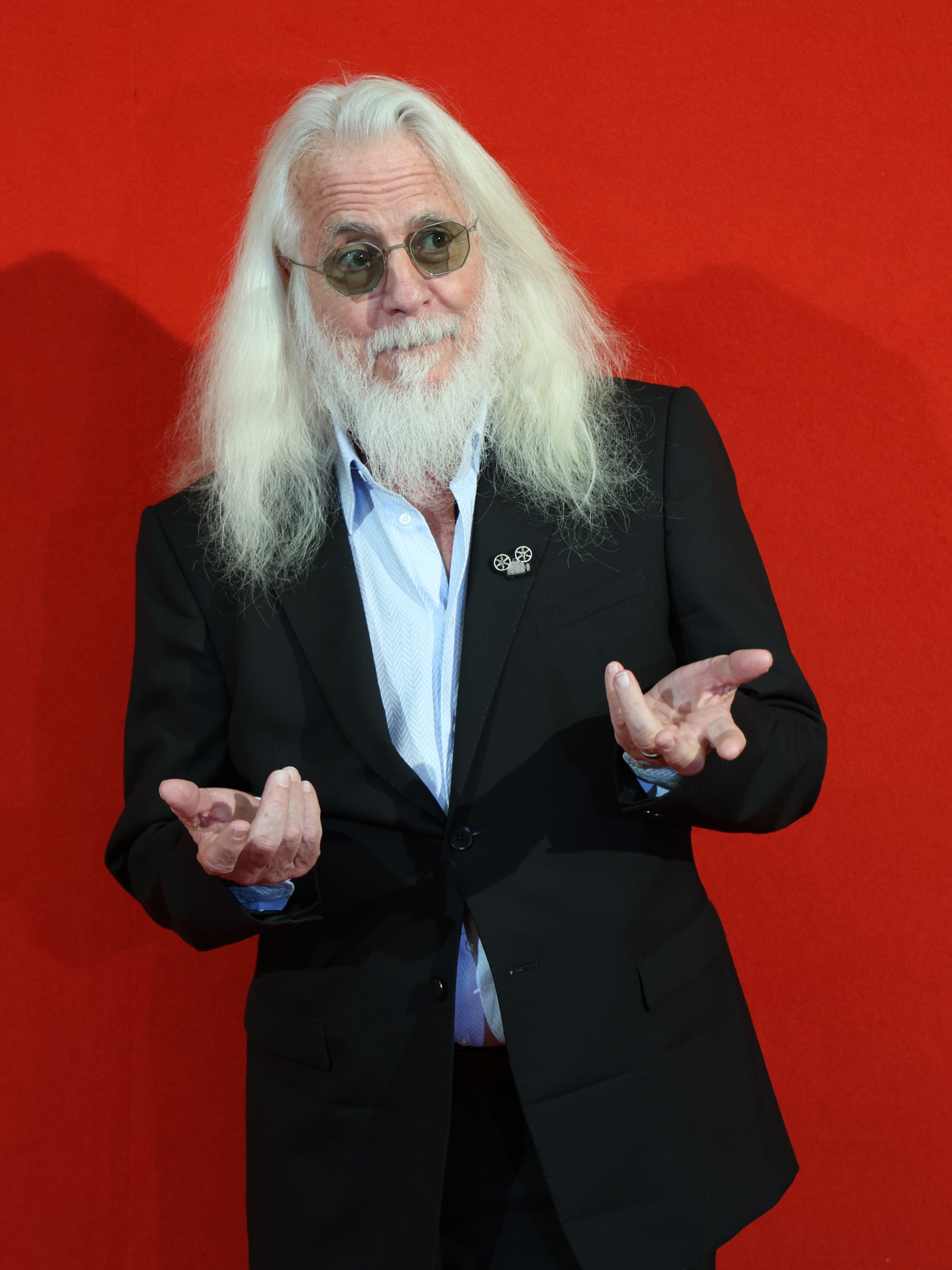
Robert Richardson, co-recipient of Crystal Globe for Outstanding Artistic Contribution to World Cinema

- Festival President's Award:

The Award was awarded to Maggie Gyllenhaal, Jeffrey Wright, Jesse Eisenberg, and Magda Vášáryová.

  - Maggie Gyllenhaal, American actress and filmmaker

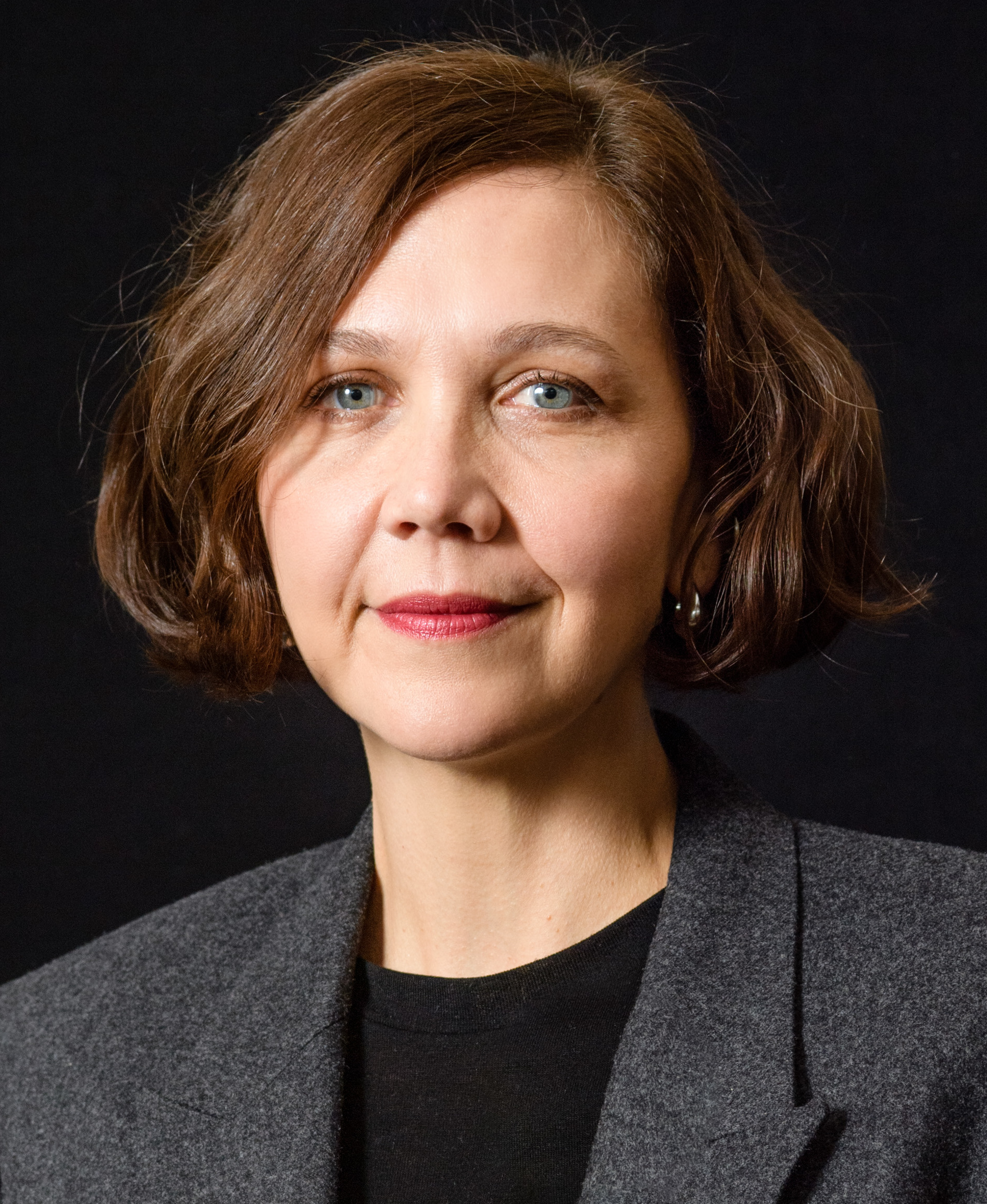
Maggie Gyllenhaal, co-recipient of Festival President's Award

  - Jeffrey Wright, American actor

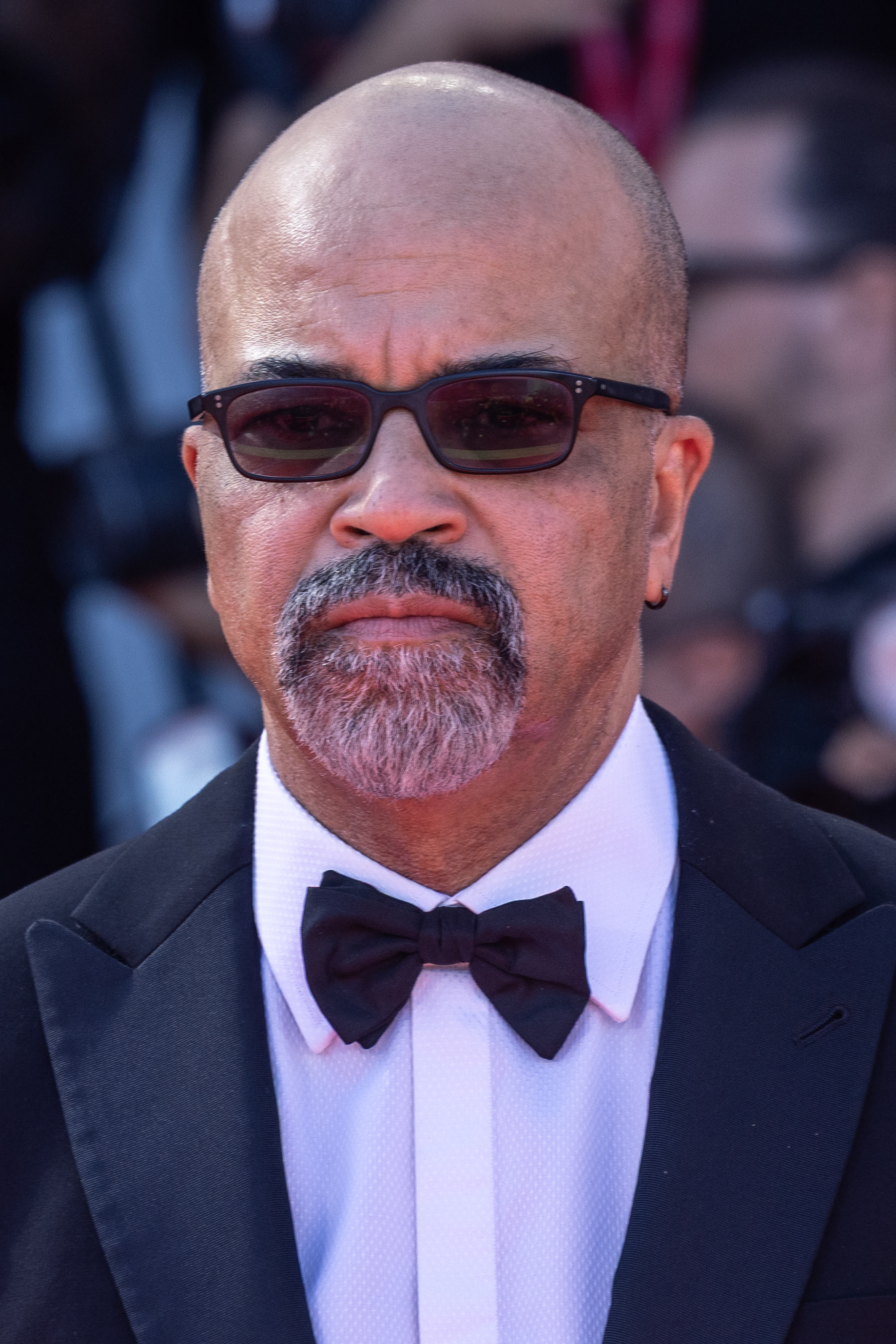
Jeffrey Wright, co-recipient of Festival President's Award

  - Jesse Eisenberg, American actor, playwright, and filmmaker

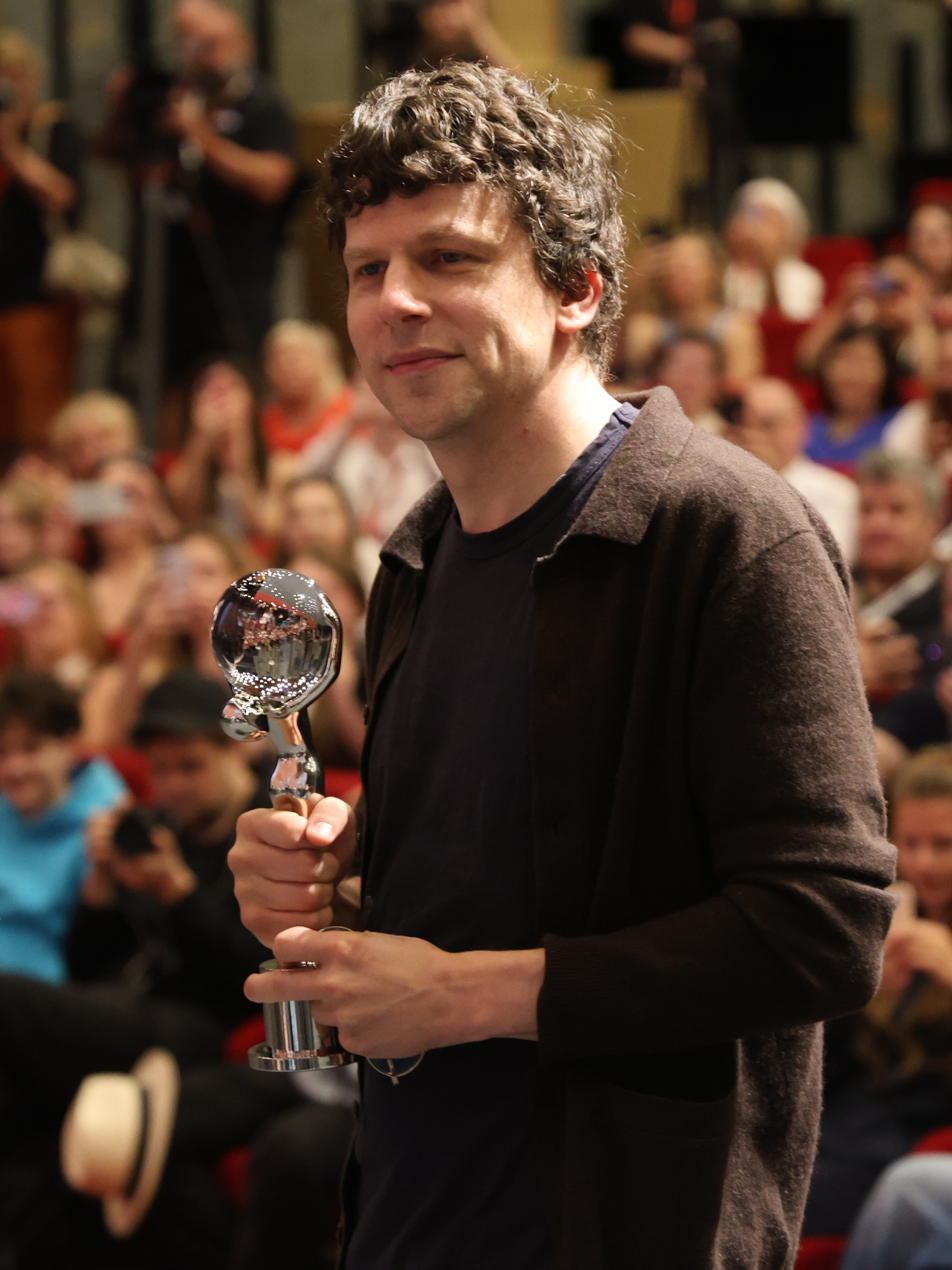
Jesse Eisenberg, co-recipient of Festival President's Award

  - Magda Vášáryová, former Slovak actress and diplomat

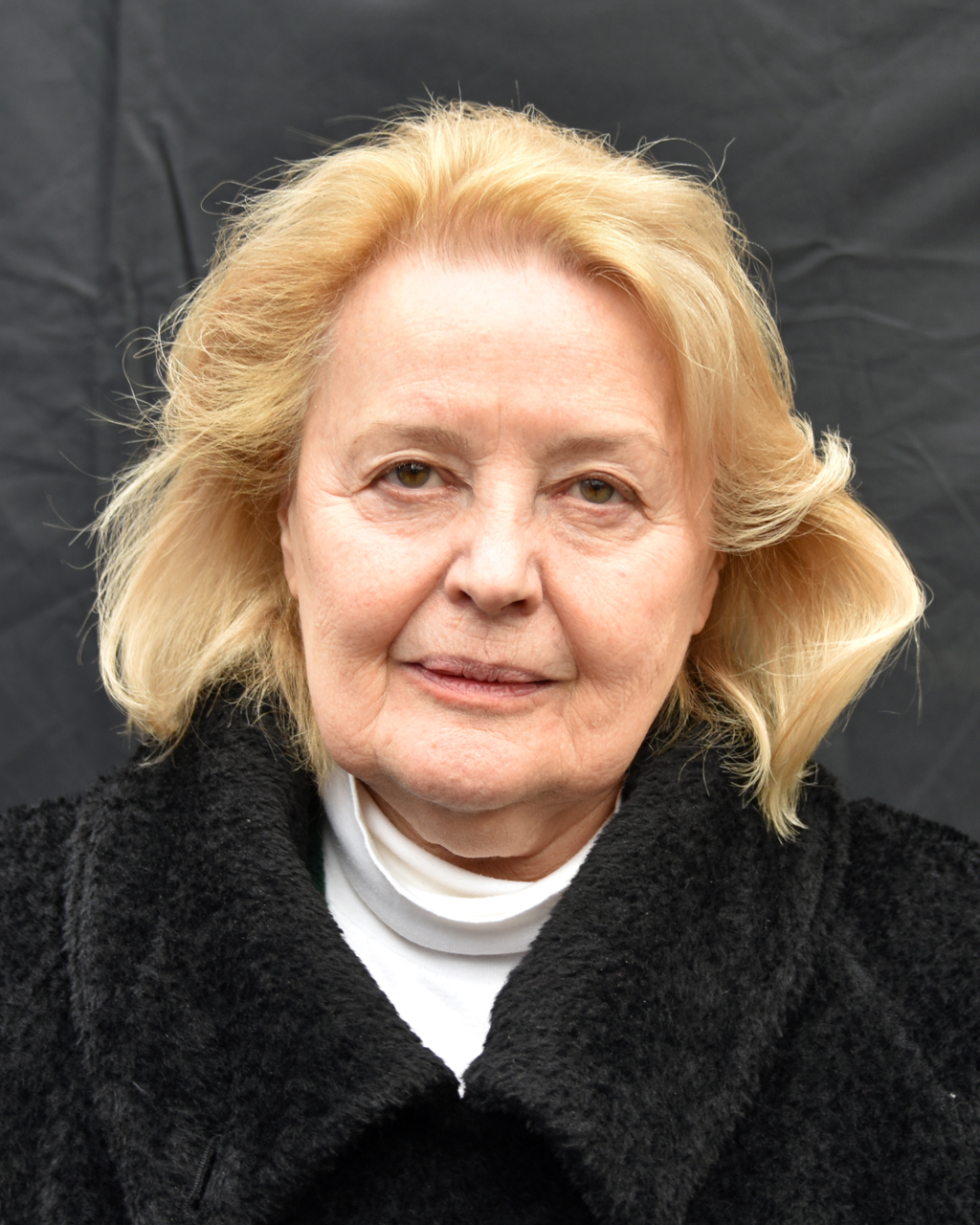
Magda Vášáryová, co-recipient of Festival President's Award
