= Babai (film) =

2015 film

- Directed by: Visar Morina
- Written by: Visar Morina
- Starring: Val Maloku; Astrit Kabashi; Adrian Matoshi; Enver Petrovci; Xhevdet Jashari
- Production companies: NiKo Film; Skopje Film Studio; Krusha; Eaux Vives Productions
- Release date: 28 June 2015 (Munich)
- Running time: 104 minutes
- Countries: Kosovo; Germany; North Macedonia; France
- Language: Albanian
- Budget: €1.7 million

Babai (English: Father) is a 2015 internationally co-produced drama film directed by Visar Morina. Morina won the Best Director Award at the 50th Karlovy Vary International Film Festival. The film was selected as the Kosovan entry for the Best Foreign Language Film at the 88th Academy Awards but it was not nominated. It is the most expensive Kosovan film produced, with a budget of €1.7 million.

== Cast ==
- Val Maloku as Nori
- Astrit Kabashi as Gëzim
- Adriana Matoshi as Valentina
- Enver Petrovci as Adem
- Xhevdet Jashari as Bedri

== See also ==
- List of submissions to the 88th Academy Awards for Best Foreign Language Film
- List of Kosovan submissions for the Academy Award for Best Foreign Language Film
