= 50th Karlovy Vary International Film Festival =

2015 film festival edition

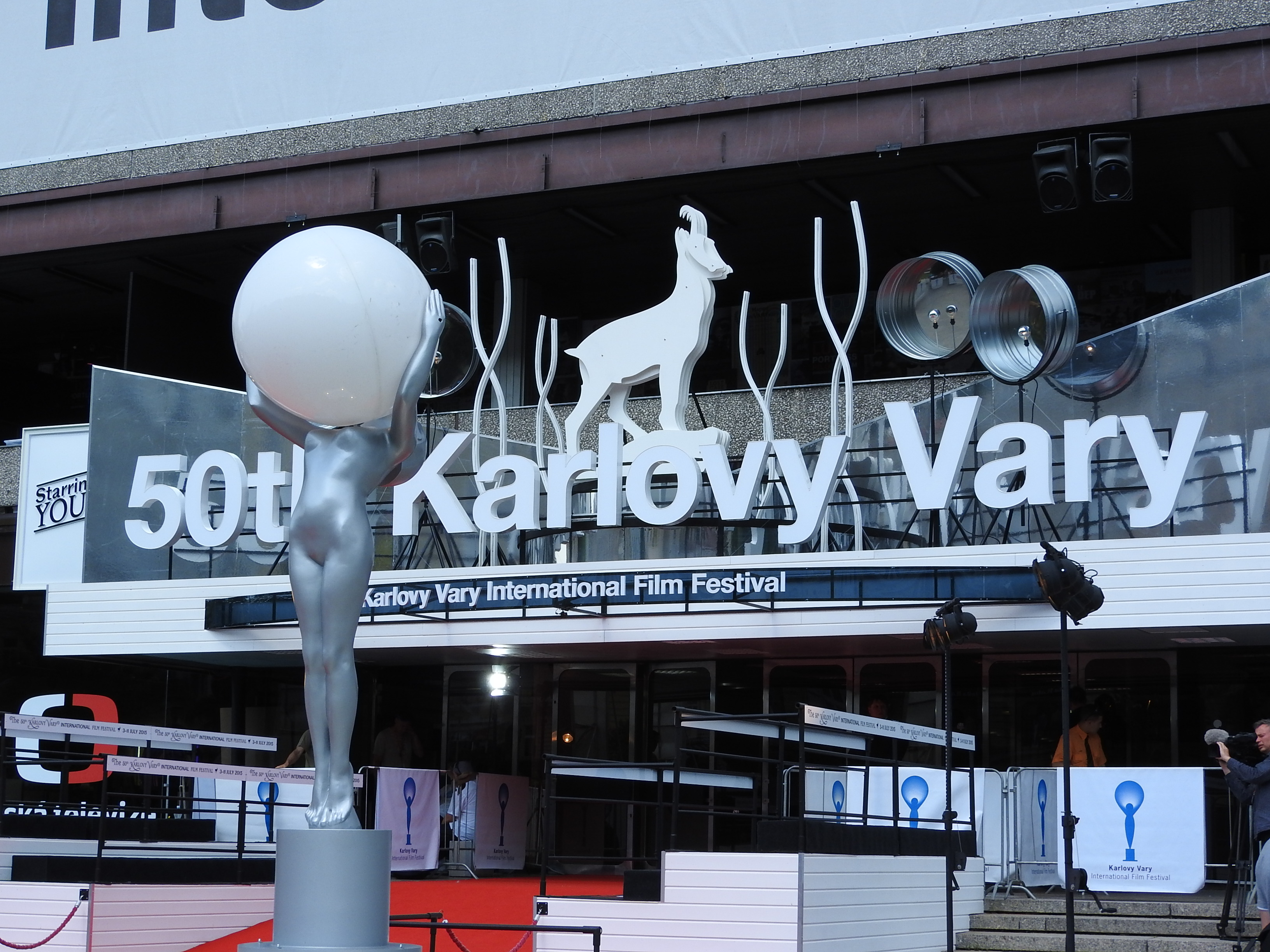
Entrance to the 50th Karlovy Vary International Film Festival.

The 50th Karlovy Vary International Film Festival took place from 3 to 11 July 2015. The Crystal Globe was won by Bob and the Trees, an American fictional vérité drama film directed by Diego Ongaro. The second prize, the Special Jury Prize was won by Those Who Fall Have Wings, an Austrian drama film directed by Peter Brunner.

== Juries ==
The following people formed the juries of the festival:

Main competition

- Luis Miñarro, Grand Jury President (Spain)
- Mira Fornay (Slovakia)
- Phedon Papamichael (Greece)
- Kjartan Sveinsson (Iceland)
- Viktor Tauš (Czech Republic)

Documentaries

- Paolo Bertolin (Italy)
- Teodora Ana Mihai (Romania)
- Ivana Pauerová Miloševič (Czech Republic)

East of the West

- Gaby Babić (Germany)
- Alexis Grivas (Greece)
- Tomáš Luňák (Czech Republic)
- Ivan I. Tverdovsky (Russia)
- Olena Yershova (Ukraine)

== Official selection awards ==
The following feature films and people received the official selection awards:

- Crystal Globe (Grand Prix) - Bob and the Trees by Diego Ongaro (USA)
- Special Jury Prize - Those Who Fall Have Wings (Jeder der fällt hat Flügel) by Peter Brunner (Austria)
- Best Director Award - Visar Morina for Babai (Germany, Kosovo, Macedonia, France)
- Best Actress Award - Alena Mihulová for her role in Home Care (Domácí péče) (Czech Republic, Slovakia)
- Best Actor Award - Kryštof Hádek for his role in The Snake Brothers (Kobry a užovky) (Czech Republic)
- Special Jury Mention - The Magic Mountain (La montagne magique) by Anca Damian (Romania, France, Poland) & Antonia by Ferdinando Cito Filomarino (Italy, Greece)

== Other statutory awards ==
Other statutory awards that were conferred at the festival:

- Best documentary film (over 30 min) - Mallory by Helena Třeštíková (Czech Republic)
  - Special Mention - The Father Tapes (Vaterfilm) by Albert Meisl (Austria)
- Best documentary film (under 30 min) - White Death (Muerta Blanca) by Roberto Collío (Chile)
  - Special Mention - Women in Sink by Iris Zaki (Great Britain, Israel)
- East of the West Award - The Wednesday Child (Szerdai gyerek) by Lili Horváth (Hungary, Germany)
  - Special Mention - The World Is Mine (Lumea e a mea) by Nicolae Constantin Tănase (Romania)
- Forum of Independents Award - Tangerine by Sean Baker (USA)
- Crystal Globe for Outstanding Artistic Contribution to World Cinema - Richard Gere (USA)
- Festival President's Award for Contribution to Czech Cinematography - Iva Janžurová (Czech Republic)
- Audience Award - Youth (La giovinezza) by Paolo Sorrentino (Italy, France, Switzerland, Great Britain)

== Non-statutory awards ==
The following non-statutory awards were conferred at the festival:

- FIPRESCI International Critics Award: Box by Florin Șerban (Romania, Germany, France)
- Ecumenical Jury Award: Bob and the Trees by Diego Ongaro (USA)
  - Special Mention: Song of Songs (Pesn pesney) by Eva Neymann (Ukraine)
- FEDEORA Award (East of the West section) (ex aequo): Heavenly Nomadic (Sutak) by Mirlan Abdykalykov (Kyrgyzstan) & The Wednesday Child (Szerdai gyerek) by Lili Horváth (Hungary, Germany)
- Europa Cinemas Label: Babai by Visar Morina (Germany, Kosovo, Macedonia, France)
