= Lover, Not a Fighter =

2026 Slovak romance film

- Theatrical release poster
- Slovak: Milovník, nie bojovník
- Directed by: Martina Buchelová
- Screenplay by: Martina Buchelová
- Produced by: Michaela Kaliská; Erika Paulinská; Julie Marková Žáčková
- Starring: Adam Kubala; Michaela Kostková; František Beleš; Mia Sofia Arpášová; Jaroslav Vojtek; Jaroslava Pokorná; Adam Burčík; Marián Mitaš
- Cinematography: Adam Mach
- Edited by: Katarína Pavelková; Marek Bihuň
- Music by: Adam Matej; Marek Buranovský
- Production companies: Ninja Film; Nochi Film
- Distributed by: Asociácia slovenských filmových klubov (ASFK); Aerofilms
- Release dates: 6 July 2026 (KVIFF); 17 September 2026 (Czech Republic)
- Running time: 109 minutes
- Countries: Slovakia; Czech Republic
- Language: Slovak

Lover, Not a Fighter (Slovak: Milovník, nie bojovník) is a 2026 romantic tragicomedy film written and directed by Martina Buchelová in her directorial debut. The film follows Andrej, who is 20, secretly in love with Miša, living with his grandma, and having the problem of climbing high trees when drunk.

The film, a co-production between Slovakia and Czech Republic, premiered at 60th Karlovy Vary International Film Festival on 6 July 2026, where it won the PROXIMA Grand Prix.

== Cast ==
- Adam Kubala as Andrej
- Michaela Kostková as Miša
- František Beleš as Peťo
- Mia Sofia Arpášová Miša's sister
- Jaroslav Vojtek as Miša's father
- Jaroslava Pokorná as Andrej's grandmother
- Adam Burčík
- Marián Mitaš

== Production ==
In July 2024, the film was awarded Works in Progress Sound Post-Production Award at Karlovy Vary Film Festival’s industry section, Eastern Promises.

It was at editing stage in July 2024.

== Release ==
Lover, Not a Fighter had its world premiere at the 60th Karlovy Vary International Film Festival on 6 July 2026 in PROXIMA Grand Prix Competition.

The film will be theatrically released in Slovak Republic by Asociácia slovenských filmových klubov and in Czech Republic by Aerofilms on 17 September 2026.

The Barcelona-based sales agent Low Light Films acquired international rights of the film in July 2026.

== Accolades ==
Award	Date of ceremony	Category	Recipient(s)	Result	Ref
Karlovy Vary International Film Festival	11 July 2026	PROXIMA Grand Prix	Lover, Not a Fighter	Won	
