= Marián Mitaš =

Slovak actor, radio DJ and puppeteer (born 1980)

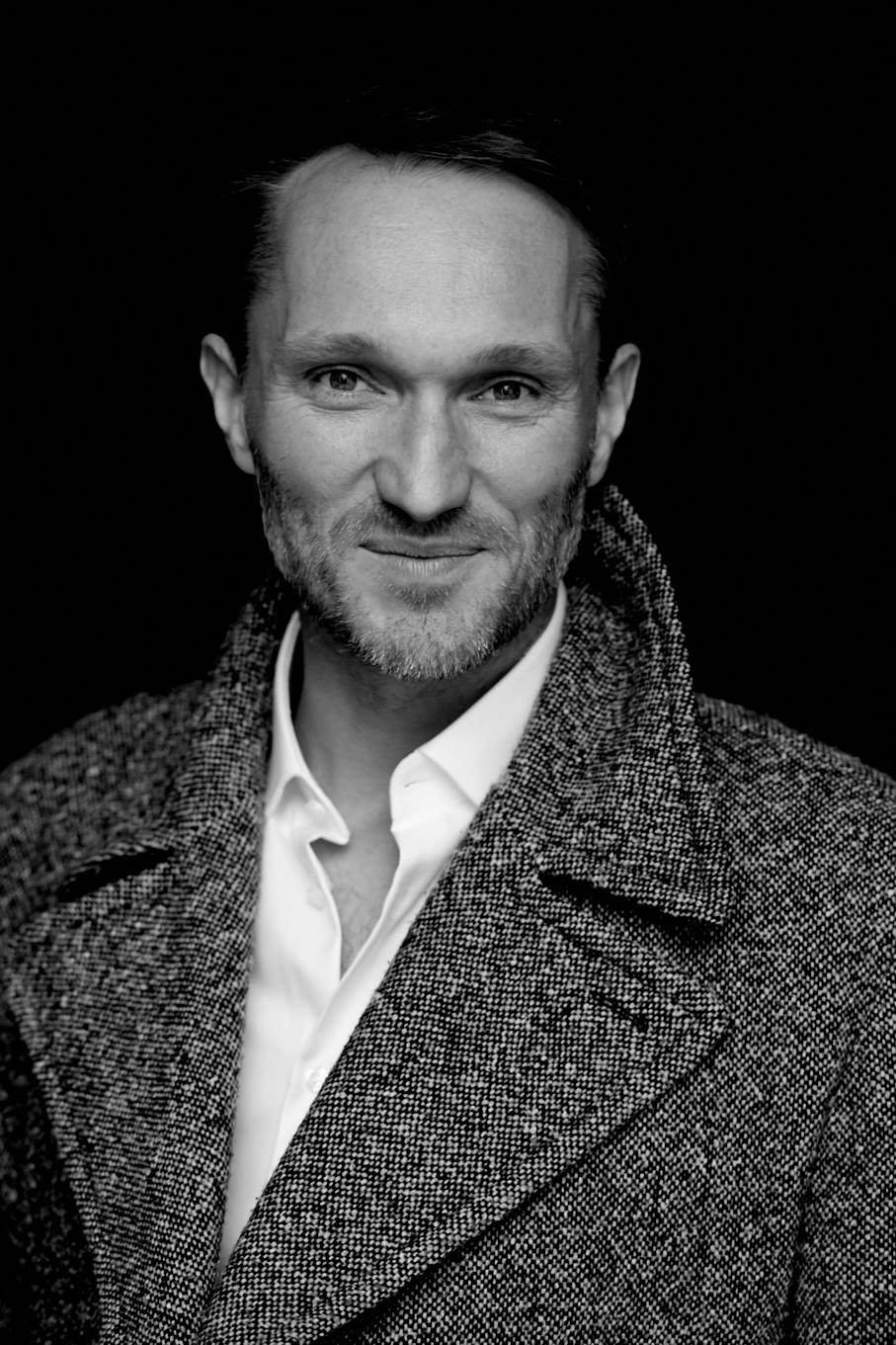
- Mitaš in 2013
- Born: 24 September 1980 (age 45); Považská Bystrica, Czechoslovakia
- Occupation: Actor
- Years active: 2003–present

Marián Mitaš (born 24 September 1980) is a Slovak actor, radio DJ and puppeteer.

== Selected filmography ==
- Time of the Wolf (2003)
- Mesto tieňov (television, 2008)
- The House (2011)
- Candidate (2013)
- Búrlivé víno (television, 2014–2015)
- Home Care (2015)
- Legends 2 (television USA, 2015)
- Milada (2017)
- DOGG (2017)
- The Zookeper's Wife (2017)
- Milenky (television, 2018)
- Toman (2018)
- The Glass Room (2018)
- Oteckovia (television, 2018–present)
- Lover, Not a Fighter (2026)
