= The High Sun =

2015 film

- Film poster
- Croatian: Zvizdan
- Directed by: Dalibor Matanić
- Written by: Dalibor Matanić
- Produced by: Ankica Jurić Tilić; Petra Vidmar; Frenk Celarc; Nenad Dukić; Miroslav Mogorović
- Starring: Tihana Lazović
- Release date: 17 May 2015 (Cannes)
- Running time: 123 minutes
- Countries: Croatia; Serbia; Slovenia
- Language: Croatian

The High Sun (Croatian: Zvizdan) is a 2015 anthology drama film directed by Dalibor Matanić. A co-production of Croatia, Serbia and Slovenia, the film tells three stories about forbidden love between a Serb woman (Tihana Lazović) and a Croat man (Goran Marković) in the Dalmatian Hinterland, set in 1991, 2001 and 2011.

The film was screened in the Un Certain Regard section at the 2015 Cannes Film Festival winning the Jury Prize. It is the first Croatian film to be screened at Cannes since the country's independence in 1991. The film was selected as the Croatian entry for the Best Foreign Language Film at the 88th Academy Awards but it was not nominated.

== Plot ==
In 1991, in the wake of the Croatian War of Independence, Jelena and Ivan are planning their flight from their home in the Hinterland to Zagreb while at a local beach. Jelena's abusive brother Saša assaults her during dinner for being in a relationship with a Croat at a time when a war between the two ethnic groups is imminent. Ivan's widowed father supports his decision to leave with Jelena, albeit hesitantly, due to Ivan's grandmother's dementia. While Saša is away, Jelena's widowed mother helps her leave. Saša, however, catches up with her and forces her into his car; Ivan runs after them. During the ride, Jelena jumps out of the car, and while Saša is trying to help her regain consciousness, she spits in his face. Saša spots Ivan approaching from a distance and drives on with Jelena to escape him. The car enters territory held by the Serb rebels, who do not let Ivan through. Ivan, a trumpeter, plays his instrument in front of them. Hearing him from their home, Saša comes to him and urges him to go home. Ivan pushes Saša to the ground, and one of the rebels shoots him. When Jelena arrives, she cries over Ivan's dead body and stares at the shocked Saša, who has yet to get up from where he was pushed.

In 2001, returning refugees Nataša Jelić and her mother Zorka return to their Hinterland home, finding it destroyed in Operation Storm. Zorka hires a local Croat handyman, Ante, to renovate the house. While Zorka is cordial with Ante, Nataša avoids him, holding a grudge against Croats for killing her brother Dražen during the operation. Zorka and Nataša argue over Nataša's treatment of Ante, during which Nataša accuses Zorka of forgetting who killed her son. When Ante helps Zorka treat a wound she sustained while chopping wood, Nataša grows warmer toward him. She invites him to join her on the beach, where she remarks on Dražen's death, making Ante feel blamed. Upset, he reveals that his father was killed by Serbs, leaving his mother mentally ill, yet he does not blame Nataša for it. The following day, when he announces that the work is done, they have passionate sex, after which Nataša grows cold again. When Zorka pays him, he refuses the money, stating that they need it more as returnees.

In 2011, on his way from Zagreb to Split, Luka stops in his Hinterland home village. He visits his parents, and the three have a vague conversation in which Luka feels guilty about something he did and his father blames his mother for being glad about what Luka did. Lying to his parents and friends, he goes to visit his former lover Marija. The guilt-ridden Luka tries to apologize to her, but Marija is resolute. She reveals that Luka's mother opposed their romance because of her Serb ethnicity. It is revealed that the two have a baby son, whom Marija allows Luka to see briefly before making him leave. At a local party, the intoxicated Luka hooks up with a hitchhiker whom he and his friend Ivno picked up on their way from Zagreb. They spot a group of partygoers running to the beach for a skinny dip and join them. In the water, Luka hallucinates Marija, and when he emerges, he rejects the hitchhiker and returns to Marija's place. When he knocks, she refuses to answer but changes her mind when she sees him sulking on her front steps. She joins him and lets him rest his head on her shoulder, but eventually goes back inside, leaving him outside.

== Cast ==
- Tihana Lazović as three Serb women:
  - Jelena, Ivan's girlfriend
  - Nataša Jelić, a returning refugee grieving her brother's death in the Croatian War or Independence
  - Marija, a single mother
- Goran Marković as three Croat men:
  - Ivan Mudrinić, a trumpeter and Jelena's boyfriend. His tombstone is shown in Luka and Marija's story.
  - Ante, a handyman who lost his father in the war and is looking after his mentally ill mother
  - Luka, a university student who fathered Marija's son
- Nives Ivanković as:
  - Jelena's mother, a widow
  - Zorka Jelić, a widow. Despite losing her son in the war, she does not hold grudges against Croats.
- Dado Ćosić as:
  - Saša, Jelena's abusive brother who opposes her romance with Ivan
  - Dražen Jelić, Nataša's brother killed in the war. He appears only in a picture on a tombstone.
- Stipe Radoja as:
  - Božo, Ivan and Jelena's friend
  - Ivno, Luka's friend
- Trpimir Jurkić as:
  - Ivan's father, a widower
  - Luka's father
- Mira Banjac as Ivan's grandmother, an elderly demented woman who believes the impeding war is actually World War II
- Slavko Sobin as:
  - Mane, a local Croat man who chastises Ivan for dating a Serb
  - Dino, Luka and Ivno's friend who organizes the party they're attending
- Lukrecija Tudor as Dinka, one of the hitchhikers Luka and Ivno pick up, and who Luka hooks up with
- Tara Rosandić as Petra, the other hitchhiker
- Ksenija Marinković as Luka's mother, who opposed his romance with a Serb

== See also ==
- List of submissions to the 88th Academy Awards for Best Foreign Language Film
- List of Croatian submissions for the Academy Award for Best Foreign Language Film
