= Fruit Gathering =

2026 Myanmar social and relationship drama film

- Theatrical release poster
- Burmese: သစ်သီးခူး
- Directed by: Aung Phyoe
- Screenplay by: Aung Phyoe
- Produced by: Thu Thu Shein; Thaiddhi
- Starring: Nandar Myat Aung; Nandar Myint Lwin; Thida Soe Khant; Tin Tin Ei; Min Nyo
- Cinematography: Thaiddhi
- Edited by: Emily Swe
- Production companies: Third Floor Film Production; D1 FILM; RUR
- Release date: 9 July 2026 (KVIFF)
- Running time: 97 minutes
- Countries: Myanmar; Czech Republic; France
- Language: Burmese

Fruit Gathering (Burmese: သစ်သီးခူး) is a 2026 romantic drama film written and directed by Aung Phyoe in his feature directorial debut. The film explores the slow-burning queer longing and intense friendship between San Kyi and Theint Theint Oo working in a Yangon garment factory. It shares its title with a poetry collection by Rabindranath Tagore.

The film, a co-production between Myanmar, Czech Republic and France premiered at 60th Karlovy Vary International Film Festival on 9 July 2026, where it won the Crystal Globe.

== Synopsis ==
The film is a quiet, intimate story set in today's Myanmar, it follows two young garment factory workers in Yangon — San Kyi and Theint Theint Oo — who slowly grow close while living through long, repetitive workdays. San Kyi is shy and often thinks about going back to her village, but there are few jobs there, so she stays. Over time, her feelings turn toward the practical, confident Theint. Their bond grows through small gestures, silence, and emotions they cannot openly express, because relationships between women are still socially unacceptable.

== Cast ==
- Nandar Myat Aung as San Kyi
- Nandar Myint Lwin as Theint Theint Oo
- Thida Soe Khant as Ei Ei Khin
- Tin Tin Ei as Ohm Kyi
- Min Nyo as Phone Shwe

== Production ==
The film directed by writer-director Aung Phyoe is the first-ever film from Myanmar to Karlovy Vary International Film Festival main competition lineup.

In August 2020, the film was presented as part of Locarno’s Open Doors co-production platform. The project in developing stage was expected to shoot in the autumn of 2021.

== Release ==
Fruit Gathering had its world premiere at the 2026 Karlovy Vary International Film Festival on 9 July 2026 in Crystal Globe Competition.

It was screened in Multicolor at the Bangkok International Film Festival on 24 September 2026, where it got Special Mention in Best ASEAN Film award.

On 7 October 2026, it was showcased in Panorama section of the 2026 Vancouver International Film Festival. It competed in the First Feature Competition at the 2026 BFI London Film Festival on 14 October 2026, and at the 21st Rome Film Festival in 'Progressive Cinema Competition - Visions for the World of Tomorrow' in October 2026. In October 2026, it also received a Special Mention in the Feature Fiction Competition at the Adelaide Film Festival.

It was also screened in the Discovery section of the 2026 Stockholm International Film Festival on 13 November 2026.

== Reception ==
In his review at Karlovy Vary International Film Festival, David Acacia of the International Cinephile Society rated the film with 4 stars out of five and praised the lead actress Nandar Myat Aung for her performance writing, "a wonderfully specific performance by Nandar Myat Aung adds even more to the development of San Kyi’s character." Acacia wrote about the film's striking contribution to queer cinema observing "that while [the film] certainly isn’t cautious or tentative about including familiar queer elements, its interest goes beyond the specificity of navigating one’s feelings for a member of the same sex." Concluding his review Acacia wrote that the film explores loneliness, longing, and the deep wish to feel complete through love from one particular person "whoever that may be".

Writing for Cineuropa, Martin Kudláč gave a positive review, describing Fruit Gathering as a "poetically inflected psychological drama about longing under pressure". He noted that, although the film is rooted in social issues, director Aung Phyoe avoids reducing it to a story solely about labour exploitation, political repression or queer identity. Instead, Kudláč wrote that the film explores how these forces influence intimate emotional decisions, concluding that it is "a delicate, sometimes elusive debut" about female intimacy and the quiet impact of social expectations on personal desire.

In his review for Variety, Guy Lodge praised Fruit Gathering for its understated emotional power, highlighting Aung Phyoe's use of silent exchanges, expressive gestures, and dreamlike cinematography of Thaiddhi to convey the evolving relationship between its two protagonists highlighted by "Akari Diraki’s beautifully tailored costumes". He noted that the film is "most artful, and most moving" in its quiet moments, where visual details and restrained performances create a strong sense of intimacy and sensuality despite keeping overt eroticism largely off screen. Lodge was more critical of the film's shift toward overt melodrama, observing that the confrontational scenes felt less convincing than its subtle emotional register, although he found the performances emotionally authentic. He concluded that the film regains its strength in a poignant ending that returns to its restrained, bittersweet tone, effectively portraying a love constrained by "stark socioeconomic reality" and experienced through only "brief, ecstatic moments of release".

== Accolades ==
Award	Date of ceremony	Category	Recipient(s)	Result	Ref
Karlovy Vary International Film Festival	11 July 2026	Crystal Globe Grand Prix	Fruit Gathering	Won	
Bangkok International Film Festival	27 September 2026	Best ASEAN Film	Fruit Gathering	Special Mention	
BFI London Film Festival	18 October 2026	Sutherland Award	Aung Phyoe	Nominated	
Asia Pacific Screen Awards	30 October 2026	Best Director	Aung Phyoe	Special Mention	
Golden Horse Awards	22 November 2026	NETPAC Award	Fruit Gathering	Nominated	
