= Bob and the Trees =

- Film poster
- Directed by: Diego Ongaro
- Produced by: Rob Cristiano; Diego Ongaro; Christie Molia
- Starring: Bob Tarasuk; Matt Gallagher; Polly MacIntyre
- Cinematography: Chris Teague; Daniel Vecchione
- Edited by: Benoit Sauvage
- Music by: Brian McBride
- Release date: January 26, 2015 (Sundance)
- Running time: 92 minutes
- Country: United States
- Language: English

Bob and the Trees is a 2015 American fictional vérité drama film that won the Crystal Globe at the Karlovy Vary International Film Festival. Shot in The Berkshires, Bob and the Trees follows farmer and logger Bob Tarasuk (played by himself), his son and business partner Matt (Matthew Gallagher), and Bob's wife Polly (Polly MacIntyre) as they work to earn money during winter. The film, Diego Ongaro's feature-length directorial debut, premiered in the noncompetitive Next section of the 2015 Sundance Film Festival in January 2015, where it was met with positive reviews.

== Background ==
Director Diego Ongaro moved from Paris to Brooklyn, New York to Sandisfield, Massachusetts, where he befriended Bob Tarasuk, a farmer and logger. Tarasuk and Matthew Gallagher, Tarasuk's son-in-law and business partner, took Ongaro to their work, where he "saw the conditions these guys lived under and how hard it is and the knowledge required", and, after he saw "how charismatic a character Bob was", Ongaro "felt [he] had a story". Originally a short released in 2011, the film was expanded to feature-length with fifteen days of shooting in November 2014.

== Release ==
The feature-length Bob and the Trees debuted at the noncompetitive Next section of the Sundance Film Festival on January 27, 2015, where it was met with warm critical reception. The Hollywood Reporter's Justin Lowe stated that the film "mines a rich vein of humanism shot through with characteristically dry New England humor", with Ongaro's "unsentimental empathy" a tone "too often missing from outsider perspectives". In a review for Indiewire, Katie Walsh described Tarasuk as "wonderfully natural, open, and unstudied", though also wrote that the "story of the making of Bob and the Trees is probably the most interesting thing about the film itself", and that it "could stand to lose about 10 minutes in [an] edit". Ben Kenigsberg of Variety drew comparison between the film's visuals and woodland work by Kelly Reichardt, and praised Tarasuk's "introverted performance". Kenigsberg called the film's resolution "at once pleasingly down-to-earth", but also "a little easy".

At the 50th Karlovy Vary International Film Festival, the film won the Crystal Globe, the festival's main award, which included a cash prize of US$25,000 (EUR€22,400). It showed at the Durban International Film Festival on July 21, 2015, at the Woods Hole Film Festival in Woods Hole, Massachusetts, on July 28 and August 1, 2015 and at the Molodist festival in Kyiv in October 2015.
