= Tihana Lazović =

Croatian actress

- Born: 25 September 1990 (age 35); Zadar, SR Croatia, SFR Yugoslavia
- Occupation: Actress
- Years active: 2012–present

Tihana Lazović (born 25 September 1990) is a Croatian film actress. She is best known for the lead role as Jelena / Nataša / Marija in The High Sun.

== Filmography ==
=== Film ===
Year	Film	Original title	Role	Notes
2013	The Priest's Children	Svećenikova djeca	The trumpet-playing girl	
2013	Hush	Šuti	Beba	
2015	The High Sun	Zvizdan	Jelena/Nataša/Marija	
2016	On the Other Side	S one strane	Jadranka	
2018	Aleksi	Aleksi	Aleksi	
2018	Just Like My Son	Sembra mio figlio	Nina	
2019	The Last Serb in Croatia	Posljednji Srbin u Hrvatskoj	Vesna	
2020	Zora	Zora	Ika	
2021	The Peacock's Paradise	Il paradiso del pavone	Joana	
2026	3 Weeks After	3 nedelje posle		Crystal Globe Competition

=== Television ===
Year	Original title	Role	Notes
2014	Stipe u gostima	Dora	1 episode
2015	Crno-bijeli svijet	Nata	1 episode
2016–2020	Novine	Tena Latinović	
2018	Jutro će promeniti sve	Ines	
2020	Tajkun	Ksenija	
2021	Silence	Lana Kralj	2 episodes
2021–2022	Podrucje bez signala	Lipsa	4 episodes
2024	Operation Sabre	Ružica Đinđić	
