= Andy Pavlov =

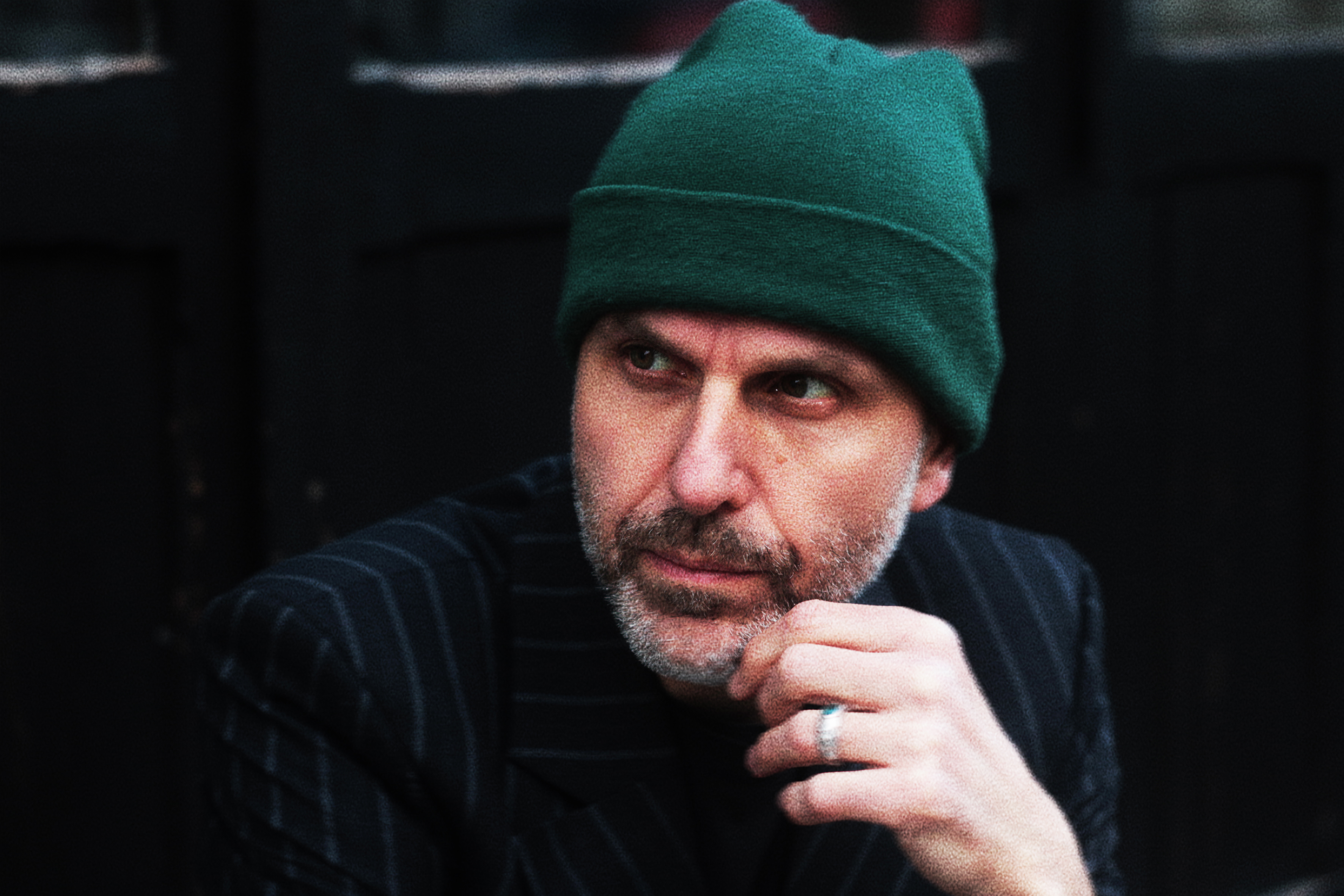
- Andy Pavlov, Spring 2025

Background information
- Born: Andrija Pavlović; 1 December 1980 (age 45); Belgrade, SR Serbia, SFR, Yugoslavia
- Genres: Classical, electronica, theater music, rock music
- Occupation: Musician
- Instruments: Piano, synthesizer, quantum piano
- Labels: Universal Music; Sweet Sensation; Donemus

Andrija Pavlović, also known as Andy Pavlov, is a pianist, composer, producer, researcher, and university lecturer. He was born in Belgrade (SR Serbia, SFR Yugoslavia) and is currently based in the Netherlands. Pavlov completed his diploma studies at the Hochschule für Musik und Theater Rostock in Germany and earned a PhD from the Faculty of Music Belgrade based on his work in the "Quantum Music" project.

He is a professor of applied music at the Department of Scenic Design, University of Novi Sad Faculty of Technical Sciences. Pavlović has also taught and conducted masterclasses and workshops at various institutions, including the University of Cincinnati, the University of Illinois Chicago, Goldsmiths, University of London, the Hochschule für Musik und Theater Rostock, and the National University of Singapore.

== Personal life ==
Being a classically trained pianist, Pavlov began playing the piano at the age of 5. At 17, he was admitted to the piano department of the Faculty of Music in Belgrade. In 2000, he won second prize for his composition "Playing La Fiesta" at the Carl Filtsch composer-performer competition in Sibiu, Romania. His early works were influenced by the compositions of Chick Corea, Herbie Hancock, Erik Satie, John Cage, as well as minimalist and rock music.

In 2001, he became more engaged in multimedia and conceptual art.

== Individual artistry ==
Taking inspiration from musicians such as Simeon ten Holt, Erik Satie, John Cage, Thelonious Monk, Gurdjieff/De Hartmann, and Rubén González, Pavlov developed a strong individual style. In addition to composing and performing neoclassical piano music, he is also active in the fields of popular electronic music and jazz. He composes music for theater, television, and film. His albums are published by Universal Music, Donemus, and Sweet Sensation labels.

At the beginning of 2022, Pavlov was an Artist in Residence at the Kavli Institute, Delft University of Technology (Netherlands), where he collaborated with quantum scientists on the project "Beyond Quantum Music". In May 2023, he was an Artist in Residence at Simeon ten Holt's House in Bergen, The Netherlands.

In 2020, together with members of the music group Sixth June (Lidija Andonov and Laslo Antal), Pavlov established the music label Sweet Sensation.

From 2001, Pavlov began an active career in multimedia and conceptual arts. He has exhibited his work at various festivals and galleries, including the April Meeting at SKC in Belgrade, the Belgrade Summer Festival (BELEF), the Biennale of Youth in Vršac, Real Presence, SKC Gallery Belgrade, Remont Gallery in Belgrade, Kapelica Gallery in Ljubljana, Slovenia, KCB Gallery in Belgrade, the Prague Quadrennial (PQ) in Prague, Czech Republic, and the Gallery Pavle Beljanski in Novi Sad, Serbia.

== LP Duo ==
In 2004, with pianist and composer Sonja Lončar, Pavlov established the piano duo LP Duo. The duo was named one of the eight best piano duos at the world's largest competition for two pianos, the Miami Dranoff Two Piano Competition in 2008. LP Duo has performed over three hundred concerts in Europe, the US, and Asia at venues including Carnegie Hall, the Kennedy Center, the Royal Danish Opera and Theatre, the Concertgebouw, Meguro Persimmon Hall, NUS University, and festivals such as Sonar Barcelona, Music in PyeongChang, South Korea, and Ars Electronica in Linz.

LP Duo has released 14 albums and are the co-founders and presenters of the art and science project "Quantum Music," with partners including Oxford University, Ars Electronica Linz, and the Institute of Musicology SASA in Belgrade.

Alongside engineers and quantum physicists, LP Duo invented a new musical instrument – the Duality Portable Hybrid Piano.

== Discography ==
=== Albums ===
==== As Andy Pavlov ====
- Mlad i Radostan – Homage to Yugoslav Music from the 80s and Beyond (with Lidija Andonov, Sweet Sensation, 2021) (featuring double bass player Greg Cohen)
- Me and My Love on The Road to Honduras (piano solo, Universal Music, 2020)
- Ola Horhe (retro-futuristic synth music, EXIT/Odličan Hrčak, 2011)

=== TV, movies, and theater ===
- Soundtrack for TV series Nemirni (2023)
- Soundtrack for the theater show Da krenemo ispočetka, directed by Andrea Ada Lazić, theater and opera Madlenianum, 2021
