= Rebekah Fortune =

British film director and screenwriter

- Occupations: Director, screenwriter
- Employer: Seahorse Films
- Notable work: Something Blue (2011); Just Charlie (2017)
- Website: https://www.seahorsefilms.co.uk/films

Rebekah Fortune is a British film director and screenwriter.

== Biography ==
After graduating with a Masters in Theatre, Fortune began her career as an actress in theatre and television. She works with filmmakers David Yates and Colin Teague. In 1997, in collaboration with writer Peter Machen, she founded her own theatre company. She was diagnosed with autism as an adult.

== Works ==
Fortune's first short film Something Blue was broadcast by Channel 4. Paul is Charlie's proud father. But when he discovers that his son is secretly fighting with his female identity, he begins his own struggle to find out what it really means to be a father. The 20-minute film juxtaposes preparations for Charlie's big sister's wedding, the most feminine day of a girl's life, with his fight to claim his true identity. Something Blue is a premise to her first feature film Just Charlie released in 2017. The football star Charlie is a girl trapped in the body of a boy. Rejected by her father and teammates, Charlie hopes to continue playing football.

Just Charlie received the Audience Award at the Edinburgh International Film Festival, the Europe Generation Award at the Seville European Film Festival, and the Best Film for Young Audience Award at the Zlín Film Festival. The film has been distributed in the United States, Canada, China, Taiwan and across Europe.

== Awards and achievements ==
- Best Feature Film for Youth, Just Charlie, Zlin Film Festival, 2017
- Europe Generation Award, Just Charlie, Seville European Film Festival, 2017
- Audience Award, Just Charlie, Edinburgh International Film Festival, 2017
- Audience Award, Just Charlie, Festival Univercine Brittanique, 2017
- Audience Award, Just Charlie, Mamers En Mars, 2017
- Cinépride Feature Film Audience Award, Just Charlie, Festival Cinépride, Nantes, 2018
- Cannes Ecrans Junior, Just Charlie, Cannes International Film Festival 2019
