= Crystal Globe (Karlovy Vary International Film Festival) =

Main award at the Czech film festival

- Awarded for: Awards for films in the Crystal Globe Competition
- Country: Czech Republic
- Presented by: Karlovy Vary International Film Festival
- First award: 1948
- Final award: 2025
- Currently held by: Fruit Gathering by Aung Phyoe
- Website: www.kviff.com/en/about-the-festival/awards

Crystal Globe (Czech: Křišťálový glóbus) is the main award at the Karlovy Vary International Film Festival, first given in the Czech Republic city of Karlovy Vary in 1948.

IFFKV presents the following awards in the international film competition:

Official selection awards

- Grand Prix - Crystal Globe for best feature film
- Special Jury Prize
- Best Director Award
- Best Actress Award
- Best Actor Award

Other awards

- East of the West Award
- Grand Prix for Best Documentary Film (For films over 30 minutes in length, and one for under 30 minutes)
- Festival President's Award
- Právo Audience Award
- Non-statutory awards

== Crystal Globe Winners - Grand Prix ==
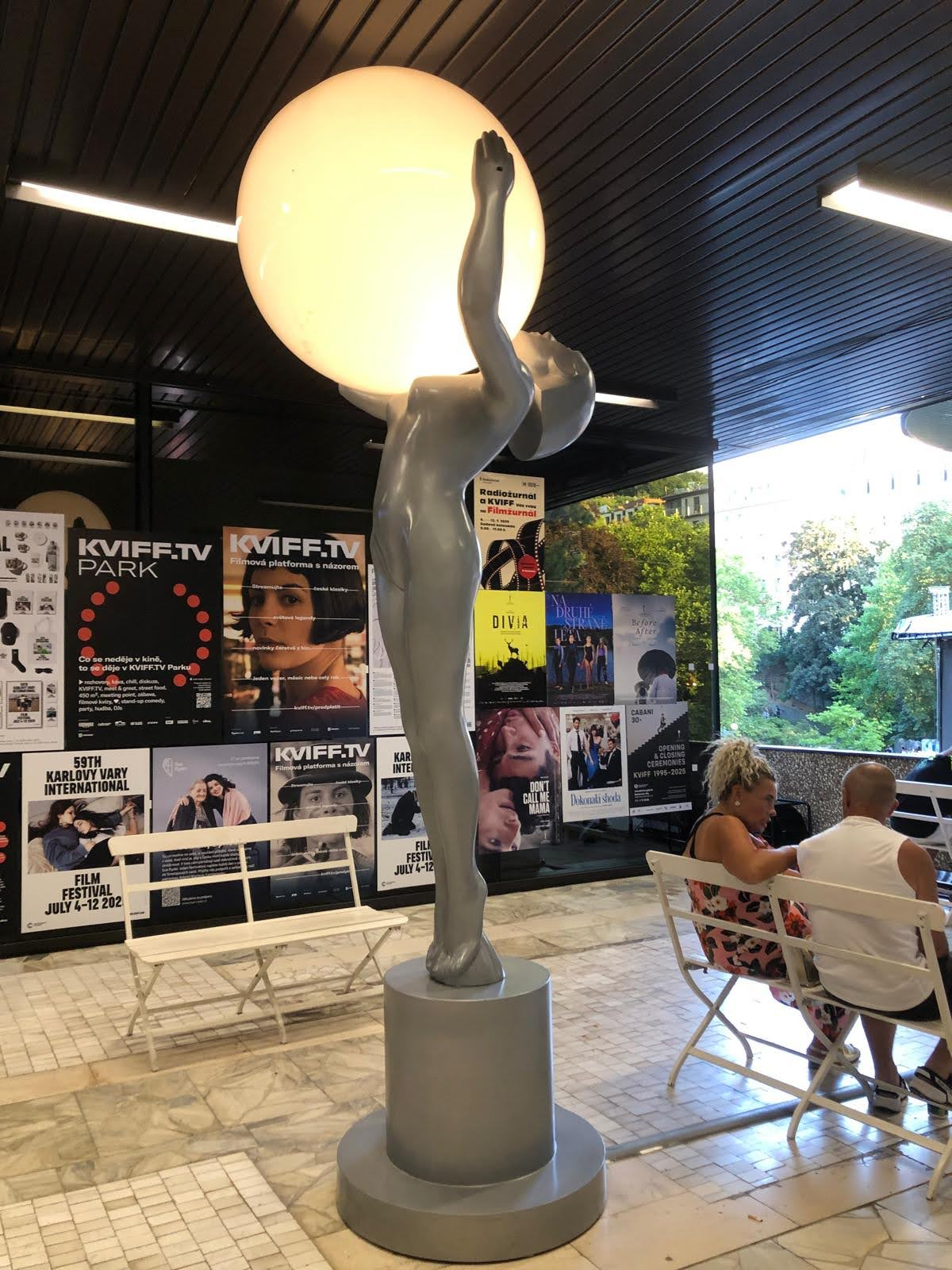
Crystal Globe statue at the 59th Karlovy Vary International Film Festival

| Year | Film | Original title | Director | Country |
|---|---|---|---|---|
| 1946 | No official awards given | | | |
| 1947 | No official awards given | | | |
| 1948 | The Last Stage | Ostatni etap | Wanda Jakubowska | Poland |
| 1949 | The Battle of Stalingrad 1 | Stalingradskaya bitva I | Vladimir Petrov | Soviet Union |
| 1950 | The Fall of Berlin | Padeniye Berlina | Mikheil Chiaureli | Soviet Union |
| 1951 | Dream of a Cossack | Kavalier zolotoj zvezdy | Yuli Raizman | Soviet Union |
| 1952 | The Unforgettable Year 1919 | Nezabyvaemyy god 1919 | Mikheil Chiaureli | Soviet Union |
| 1954 | Salt of the Earth | | Herbert J. Biberman | United States |
| 1954 | True Friends | Vernye druz'ya | Mikhail Kalatozov | Soviet Union |
| 1956 | If All the Guys in the World | Si tous les gars du monde | Christian-Jaque | France |
| 1957 | Jagte Raho | | Sombhu Mitra, Amit Mitra | India |
| 1958 | And Quiet Flows the Don | Tikhiy Don | Sergei Gerasimov | Soviet Union |
| 1958 | Stepbrothers | 異母兄弟 | Miyoji Ieki | Japan |
| 1960 | Seryozha | | Georgi Daneliya, Igor Talankin | Soviet Union |
| 1962 | Nine Days of One Year | 9 dney odnogo goda | Mikhail Romm | Soviet Union |
| 1964 | Accused | Obžalovaný | Ján Kadár, Elmar Klos | Czechoslovakia |
| 1966 | Not awarded | | | |
| 1968 | Capricious Summer | Rozmarné léto | Jiří Menzel | Czechoslovakia |
| 1970 | Kes | | Ken Loach | United Kingdom |
| 1972 | Taming of the Fire | Ukroshcheniye ognya | Daniil Khrabrovitsky | Soviet Union |
| 1974 | A Lover's Romance | Romans o vlyublyonnykh | Andrei Konchalovsky | Soviet Union |
| 1976 | Cantata de Chile | | Humberto Solás | Cuba |
| 1978 | Shadows of a Hot Summer | Stíny horkého léta | František Vláčil | Czechoslovakia |
| 1978 | White Bim Black Ear | Belyy Bim - Chyornoe ukho | Stanislav Rostotsky | Soviet Union |
| 1980 | The Fiancee | Die Verlobte | Günter Reisch, Günther Rücker | East Germany |
| 1982 | Red Bells | Krasnye kolokola, film pervyy - Meksika v ogne | Sergei Bondarchuk | Mexico, Soviet Union, Italy |
| 1984 | Lev Tolstoy | | Sergei Gerasimov | Soviet Union, Czechoslovakia |
| 1986 | A Street to Die | | Bill Bennett | Australia |
| 1988 | Hibiscus Town | 芙蓉鎮 | Xie Jin | China |
| 1990 | Not awarded | | | |
| 1992 | Krapatchouk | | Enrique Gabriel | Spain, Belgium, France |
| 1994 | My Soul Brother | Mi hermano del alma | Mariano Barroso | Spain |
| 1995 | The Ride | Jízda | Jan Svěrák | Czech Republic |
| 1996 | Prisoner of the Mountains | Kavkazskiy plennik | Sergei Bodrov | Russia, Kazakhstan |
| 1997 | My Life in Pink | Ma vie en rose | Alain Berliner | Belgium, France, UK |
| 1998 | Streetheart | Le coeur au poing | Charles Binamé | Canada |
| 1999 | Yana's Friends | Hachaverim shel Yana | Arik Kaplun | Israel |
| 2000 | Me You Them | Eu Tu Eles | Andrucha Waddington | Brazil |
| 2001 | Amélie | Le fabuleux destin d'Amélie Poulain | Jean-Pierre Jeunet | France |
| 2002 | Year of the Devil | Rok ďábla | Petr Zelenka | Czech Republic |
| 2003 | Facing Windows | La Finestra di fronte | Ferzan Özpetek | Italy, UK, Turkey, Portugal |
| 2004 | A Children's Story | Certi bambini | Andrea Frazzi, Antonio Frazzi | Italy |
| 2005 | My Nikifor | Mój Nikifor | Krzysztof Krauze | Poland |
| 2006 | Sherrybaby | | Laurie Collyer | United States |
| 2007 | Jar City | Mýrin | Baltasar Kormákur | Iceland |
| 2008 | Terribly Happy | Frygtelig lykkelig | Henrik Ruben Genz | Denmark |
| 2009 | Angel at Sea | Un ange à la mer | Frédéric Dumont | Belgium |
| 2010 | The Mosquito Net | La mosquitera | Agustí Vila | Spain |
| 2011 | Restoration | Boker tov adon fidelman | Yossi Madmoni | Israel |
| 2012 | The Almost Man | Mer eller mindre mann | Martin Lund | Norway |
| 2013 | The Notebook | A nagy füzet | János Szász | Hungary |
| 2014 | Corn Island | Simindis kundzuli | Giorgi Ovashvili | Georgia |
| 2015 | Bob and the Trees | | Diego Ongaro | USA, France |
| 2016 | It's Not the Time of My Life | Ernelláék Farkaséknál | Szabolcs Hajdu | Hungary |
| 2017 | Little Crusader | Křižáček | Václav Kadrnka | Czech Republic, Slovakia, Italy |
| 2018 | I Do Not Care If We Go Down in History as Barbarians | Îmi este indiferent dacă în istorie vom intra ca barbari | Radu Jude | Romania, Czech Republic, Germany, Bulgaria, France |
| 2019 | The Father | Бащата | Kristina Grozeva, Petar Valchanov | Bulgaria, Greece |
| 2021 | As Far as I Can Walk | Strahinja Banović | Stefan Arsenijević | Serbia, France |
| 2022 | Summer with Hope | Tabestan Ba Omid | Sadaf Foroughi | Iran, Canada |
| 2023 | Blaga's Lessons | Urotcite na Blaga | Stephan Komandarev | Bulgaria, Germany |
| 2024 | A Sudden Glimpse to Deeper Things | | Mark Cousins | United Kingdom |
| 2025 | Better Go Mad in the Wild | | Miro Remo | Czech Republic, Slovakia |
| 2026 | Fruit Gathering | သစ်သီးခူး | Aung Phyoe | Myanmar, Czech Republic, France |

== Crystal Globe for Outstanding Artistic Contribution to World Cinema ==
- 2008 - Robert DeNiro
- 2009 - John Malkovich, Isabelle Huppert
- 2010 - Jude Law
- 2011 - Judi Dench
- 2012 - Susan Sarandon, Helen Mirren
- 2013 - John Travolta, Oliver Stone, Theodor Pištěk
- 2014 - Mel Gibson
- 2015 - Richard Gere
- 2016 - Willem Dafoe
- 2017 - James Newton Howard
- 2018 - Tim Robbins, Barry Levinson
- 2019 - Julianne Moore, Patricia Clarkson, Billy Crudup
- 2021 - Michael Caine, Johnny Depp, Jan Svěrák
- 2022 - Geoffrey Rush
- 2023 - Russell Crowe
- 2025 - Stellan Skarsgård
- 2026 - Dustin Hoffman, Juliette Binoche, Robert Richardson
