= Donemus =

Donemus (compounded from Documentatiecentrum nederlandse muziek) is the Dutch institute dealing with the documentation of contemporary music composed in the Netherlands.

Originally a publisher of scores, between 1960 and 2000 Donemus also published a series of recordings titled Composers' Voice (CV); initially on LP, and later on CD. The originally large archive of hand-written scores was sent back to the composers in the early 21st century; today the archive is maintained mainly digitally.

== See also ==
- Gaudeamus Foundation
