= The Elementary Particles =

The Elementary Particles may refer to:

- Elementary particle, concept in particle physics
- Atomised, novel by Michel Houellebecq
  - Atomised (film), German film based on the novel
  - The Elementary Particles (2021 film), French television film based on the novel
