= Divia =

2025 Ukrainian documentary film

- Official poster
- Directed by: Dmytro Hreshko
- Screenplay by: Dmytro Hreshko
- Produced by: Polina Herman; Glib Lukianets
- Cinematography: Dmytro Hreshko; Volodymyr Usyk
- Edited by: Alexander Legostaev; Anastasia Kirillova; Dmytro Hreshko
- Music by: Sam Slater
- Production companies: Gogol Film; UP UA Studio; Valk Productions
- Release date: 6 July 2025 (KVIFF)
- Running time: 79 minutes
- Countries: Poland; Ukraine; Netherlands; United States
- Language: Speechless film

Divia (Ukrainian: Дівія) is a 2025 documentary film written and directed by Dmytro Hreshko. The film documents Ukraine's transformation from serene natural beauty to devastation under the Russian invasion. With spring, life tentatively reemerges, but the vast destruction offers little hope for swift ecological recovery.

An international co-production, the film premiered at 59th Karlovy Vary International Film Festival on 6 July 2025. It was nominated for Crystal Globe in the main competition. It had its Regional premiere at the 31st Sarajevo Film Festival in August 2025, in the Competition programme - Documentary Film, where it competed for Heart of Sarajevo award.

== Synopsis ==
Divia is the Slavic goddess of wild nature, forests, hunting and the moon. The title of film refers to the goddess, as the goddess "represents nature as well as rebelliousness in the face of war and death."

Divia is a poetic documentary that explores the dual devastation of war—both human and ecological. Set against the backdrop of Russia's invasion of Ukraine, it captures silent landscapes transformed by violence: scorched forests, ruined fields, and flooded towns. Yet, amidst the wreckage, the film highlights the quiet resilience of nature and humanity. Through the lens of mine-clearers, ecologists, and recovery teams, it reveals the painful but determined effort to heal fragile ecosystems while conflict looms on the horizon.

== Production ==
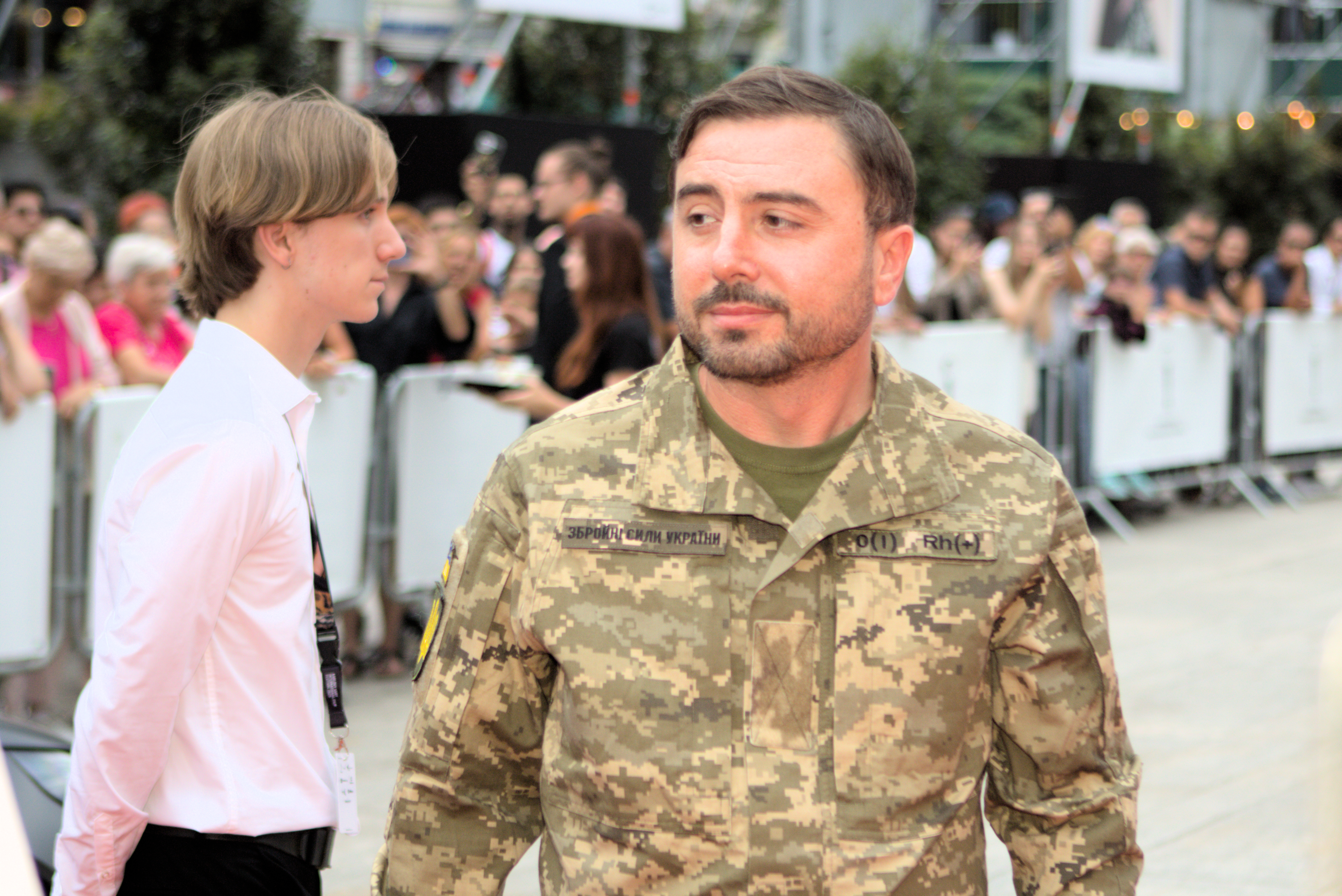
Dmytro Hreshko, director of Divia at the 59th Karlovy Vary International Film Festival

The film is produced by Gogol Film and UP UA Studio, with Valk Productions as co-producer, is an observation documentary. There are no dialogues, no voiceover, only meaningful silence. Exterminated forests, flooded villages, rescuers, deminers, animal rescue volunteers and nature are the main character of this film.

It received the financial support from the Polish Film Institute, Netherlands Film Fund, and the FILM BOOST scholarship program, in collaboration with Deutsche Filmakademie and the Ukrainian Film Academy. Additional cooperation and support came from Netflix, the Emergency Support Initiative by Kyiv Biennial, Göteborg Film Fund, and Prague Civil Society Center. The Ministry of Environmental Protection and Natural Resources of Ukraine, the State Forest Resources Agency of Ukraine, Cultural Forces, Babylon'13, Ukraïner, Tint Post, Starlight Creative, DocuDays UA, the Office of the Prosecutor General, B2B Doc, Film Independent, and Global Media Makers, supported the project.

In October 2023, the film won the Current Time TV Award at the DOK Co-Pro Market, DOK Leipzig.

The shooting of the film began three years ago, with 77 shooting days and about 130 hours’ worth of content.

== Release ==
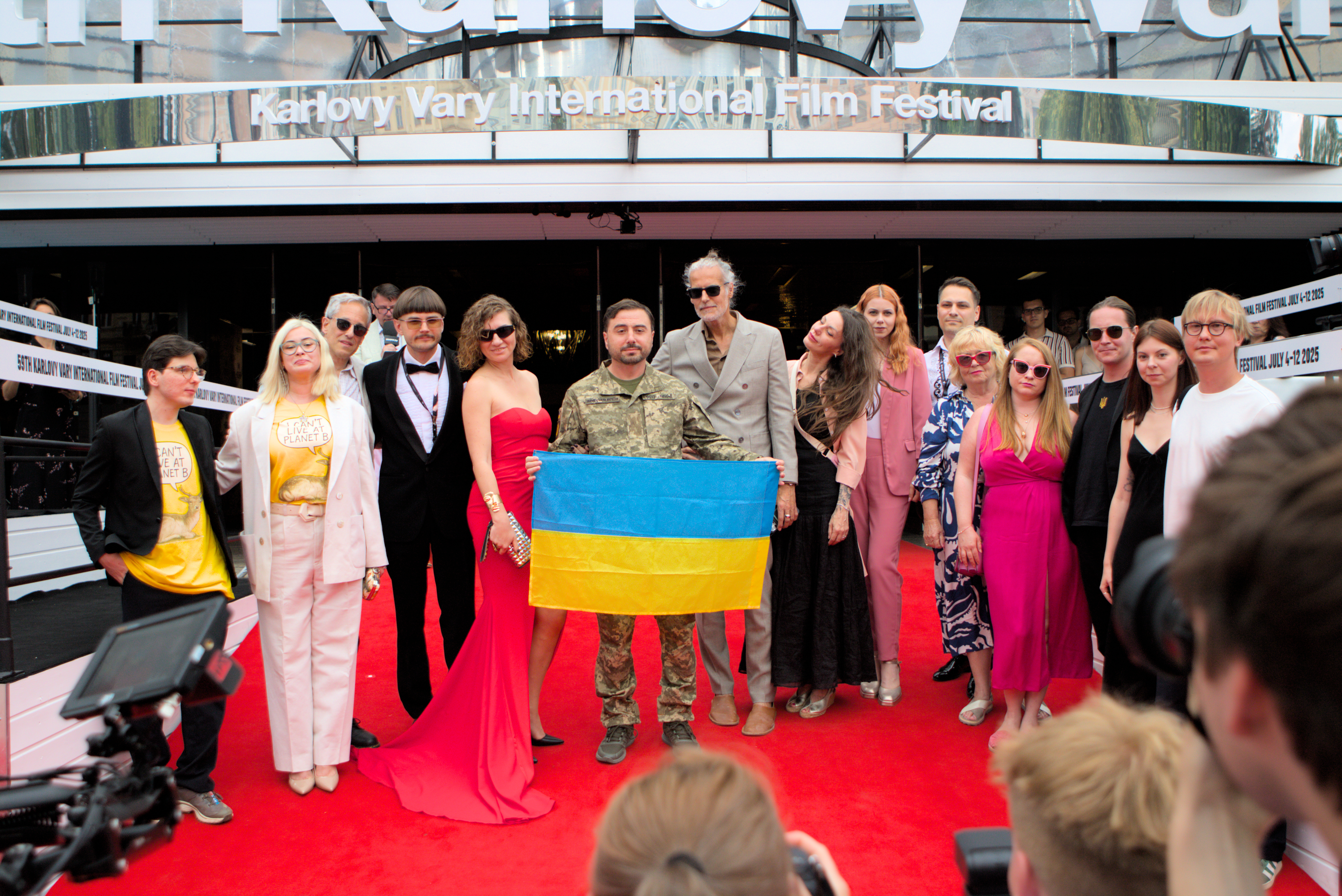
Delegation to the film Divia at the 59th Karlovy Vary International Film Festival

Divia had its premiere at 59th Karlovy Vary International Film Festival on 6 July 2025, where it competed for the Crystal Globe with the other eleven films. It also competed for Heart of Sarajevo award in the Competition programme - Documentary Film at the 31st Sarajevo Film Festival on 21 August 2025.

The film was presented in the Projects in Production and Post-Production section of the New Visions Forum at the 28th Ji.hlava International Documentary Film Festival in November 2024, a programme dedicated to spotlighting emerging documentary voices and pressing global themes.

The film was also selected at the 15th edition of 'When East Meets West' held in conjunction with 38th Trieste Film Festival in January 2025, where it won Arte Video Award in 'Last Stop Trieste' category.

It was presented in the 'Standing with Ukraine' at the 29th Tallinn Black Nights Film Festival on 10 November 2025.

The film was shortlisted alongwith other seven films as the Ukraine‘s Oscar submission for 98th Academy Awards.

== Reception ==
Moritz Pfeifer reviewing for East European Film Bulletin wrote that Divia channels a Ukrainian tradition of framing war and environmental collapse as part of a story of resilience and renewal, though "in asking us to admire sacrifice," may risk reframing pain or trauma "as a means of rather than an obstacle to ecological recovery." Vladan Petkovic in Cineuropa wrote that the "key assets of the film are – expectedly – the cinematography by Hreshko and Volodymyr Usyk, the music by Sam Slater, and the sound design by Vasyl Yatsushenko and Mykhailo Zakutskyi," and in his opinion, all these "operating meticulously both on a grand scale and in smaller," created intimate moments.

== Accolades ==
Award	Date of ceremony	Category	Recipient	Result	Ref.
Dok Leipzig	14 October 2023	DOK Co-Pro Market: Current Time TV Award	Divia	Won	
Sarajevo Film Festival	22 August 2024	CineLink Docu Rough Cut Boutique awards: Think-Film Impact Production	Divia	Won	
Karlovy Vary International Film Festival	12 July 2025	Crystal Globe Grand Prix	Divia	Nominated	
Sarajevo Film Festival	22 August 2025	Heart of Sarajevo	Divia	Nominated	

== See also ==
- Russo-Ukrainian War
- List of Ukrainian submissions for the Academy Award for Best International Feature Film
