= Sand City =

Sand City may refer to:

- Sand City, California, a city in the United States
- Sand City (2025 film), a Bangladeshi film
- Manal Naharam, an Indian film also known as Sand City
