= Les Drapeaux de papier =

2018 French drama film by Nathan Ambrosioni

- Directed by: Nathan Ambrosioni
- Written by: Nathan Ambrosioni
- Produced by: Sensito Films; Orage Films; Eclair; TSF (co-productions)
- Starring: Noemie Merlant; Guillaume Gouix
- Cinematography: Raphaël Vandenbussche
- Edited by: Nathan Ambrosioni
- Music by: Matthew Otto
- Distributed by: Dezo Films; K-Films Amérique (Québec)
- Release date: 2018
- Running time: 102 minutes
- Country: France
- Language: French
- Budget: €1 million

Les Drapeaux de papier (English: Paper Flags) is a 2018 French drama film written, directed, and edited by Nathan Ambrosioni. It marks his debut as a filmmaker at the age of eighteen.

== Synopsis ==
Vincent reunites with his younger sister after 12 years of imprisonment.

== Cast ==
- Noemie Merlant as Charlie
- Guillaume Gouix as Vincent
- Sébastien Houbani as Pierre
- Jérôme Kircher as Jean, the father
- Alysson Paradis as Emma
- Anne Loiret as the psychologist

== Awards ==
- Angers European First Film Festival 2018 : Prize of Public Jean-Claude Brialy
