= Don't Call Me Mama =

2025 Norwegian drama film

- Promotional poster
- Norwegian: Se meg
- Directed by: Nina Knag
- Written by: Nina Knag; Kathrine Valen Zeiner
- Produced by: Eléonore Anselme; Ingrid Skagestad
- Starring: Pia Tjelta; Kristoffer Joner; Tarek Zayat
- Cinematography: Alvilde Horten Naterstad
- Edited by: Vidar Flataukan
- Music by: Olav Røyrhus Øyehaug
- Production companies: The Global Ensemble Drama; Screen Story; Mediefondet Zefyr
- Distributed by: Scanbox Entertainment.
- Release dates: 9 July 2025 (KVIFF); 31 October 2025 (Norway)
- Running time: 108 minutes
- Country: Norway
- Language: Norwegian

Don't Call Me Mama (Norwegian: Se meg) is a Norwegian drama film directed by Nina Knag in her debut feature. The film is about "forbidden love, as it confronts its protagonists with a moral test while provocatively exploring how hypocrisy can masquerade as generosity."

It was premiered at 59th Karlovy Vary International Film Festival on 9 July 2025, and competed for Crystal Globe.

The film was released in Norwegian theatres on 31 October 2025.

== Premise ==
Eva, a popular high school educator and spouse of the mayor, experiences a dramatic upheaval in her life after developing feelings for a young asylum seeker, sparking a forbidden relationship that ultimately results in devastating outcomes.

== Cast ==
- Pia Tjelta as Eva
- Kristoffer Joner as Jostein
- Tarek Zayat as Amir
- Kathrine Thorborg Johansen as Ingeborg

== Production ==
Pia Tjelta was cast in the film in May 2024 along with Kristoffer Joner, Tarek Zayat, and Kathrine Thorborg Johansen. The filming began in June 2024.

== Release ==
Don't Call Me Mama had its premiere at 59th Karlovy Vary International Film Festival on 9 July 2025, where it competed for Crystal Globe with other eleven feature films. The trailer was released on 30 June 2025, before the start of the festival by the Nordic distributor Scanbox Entertainment.

== Accolades ==
Year	Award	Category	Recipient(s)	Result	Ref
2025	Karlovy Vary International Film Festival	Crystal Globe Grand Prix	Don't Call Me Mama	Nominated	
2025	Karlovy Vary International Film Festival	Best Actress Award	Pia Tjelta	Won	
