= Les Particules élémentaires (play) =

2013 play by Julien Gosselin

Les Particules élémentaires (lit. 'The Elementary Particles') is a play by the French writer Julien Gosselin, adapted from the novel Atomised by Michel Houellebecq.

== Plot ==
Michel and Bruno are half brothers born in 1956 and 1958. Michel is a molecular biologist incapable of desire and love. Bruno is a school teacher obsessed with sex. As they are followed through the 1980s and 1990s, the libertine ideas of the 1960s and 1970s that formed them lead them to self-loathing, narcissism and boredom. The runtime is around 3 hours and 50 minutes.

== Production history ==
The play was first performed in July 2013 at the Festival d'Avignon. It toured France in the following autumn and spring, starting at the Théâtre du Nord in Lille on 8 November 2013. On 20 and 21 November 2013 it played at Théâtre de Vanves, 8 April 2014 at Théâtre de Soissons and 15 to 18 April 2014 at La rose des vents - Villeneuve-d'Ascq.

It played at Les Ateliers Berthier of the Odéon-Théâtre de l'Europe in Paris from 9 October to 14 November 2014. The production was reprised at Odéon-Théâtre from 12 September to 1 October 2017. It was directed by Gosselin who also created the set design. The cast consisted of Joseph Drouet, Denis Eyriey, Antoine Ferron, Noémie Gantier, Carine Goron, Alexandre Lecroc-Lecerf, Caroline Mounier, Victoria Quesnel, Geraldine Roguez and Maxence Vandevelde. From 5 to 9 December 2017, it played at the Théâtre national in Brussels.

== Reception ==
Christian Jade of RTBF praised Gosselin for incorporating music and video in a way that feels natural and helps to make the complex source material work on stage, retaining the novel's story about the two brothers and its caricatures of the 1968 era's sexual excesses and capitalism. Cédric Enjalbert of Philosophie Magazine called the play "a profound and dynamic show, a bold adaptation of this portrait of the past and future world, a prelude to posthumanity".
