= Pia Tjelta =

Norwegian actress (born 1977)

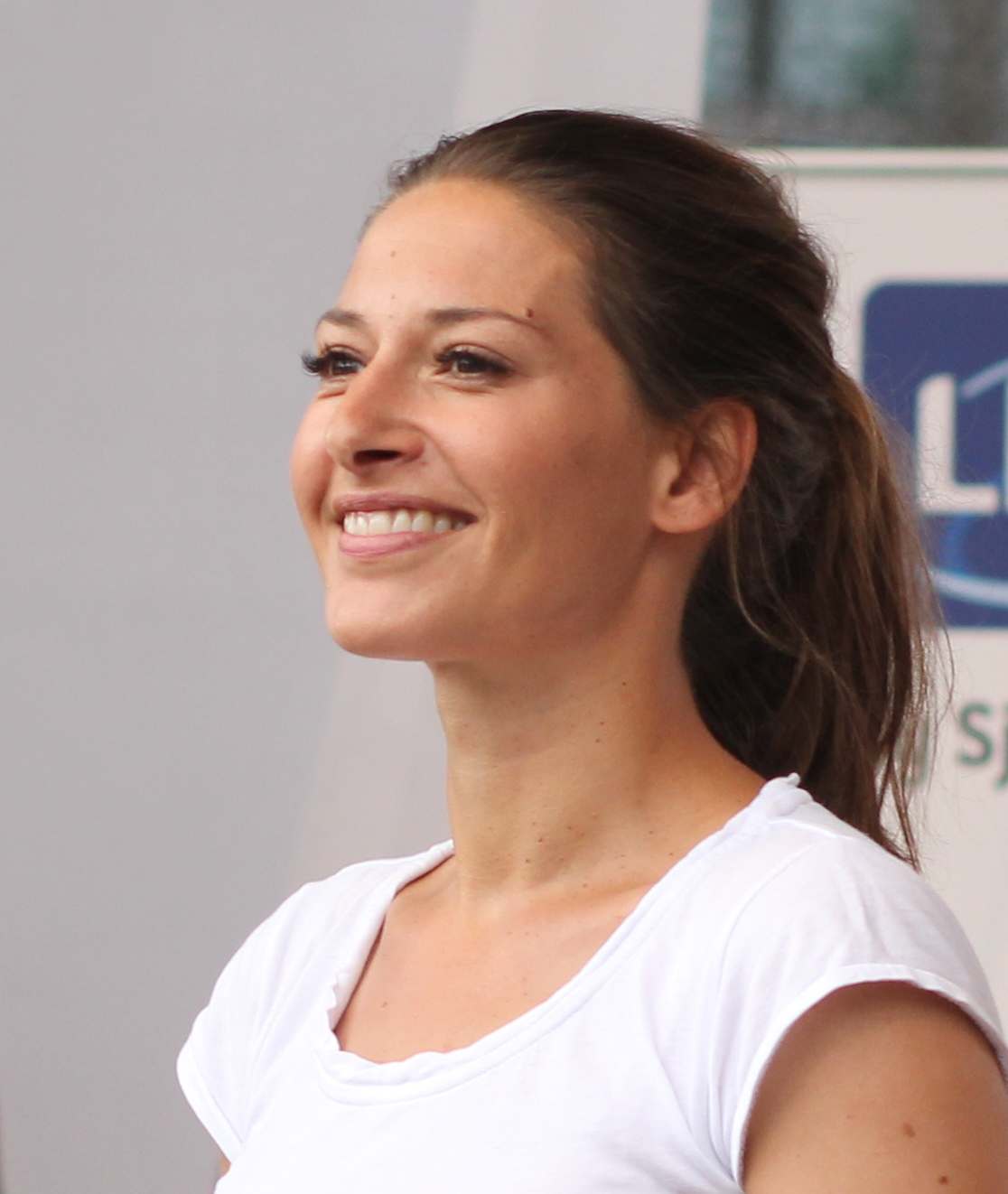
- Tjelta in July 2013
- Born: Pia Merete Tjelta; 12 September 1977 (age 48); Sola Municipality, Norway
- Occupation: Actress

Pia Merete Tjelta (born 12 September 1977, in Sola Municipality) is a Norwegian actress.

Tjelta graduated from the Norwegian National Academy of Theatre in 2006, but had already appeared in many films. She made her film debut in 2001 in the film Mongoland. She entered the Norwegian National Academy of Theatre in 2000, but after taking a two-year maternity leave, she did not manage to graduate until 2006. In 2005, she also worked on the jury of the TV series Filmstjerne on TV 2.

She made her stage debut in 2006 with the play Fyrverkerimakarens dotter at Det Norske Teatret. In 2007 she starred in the play "Få meg på, for faen" (based on the Norwegian book by the same name) at Det Norske Teatret, where she played Maria.

In February 2007, she received much media coverage for her lead role in the Norwegian romantic comedy Mars og Venus. The film was described as the year's big feelgood film.

In 2014, she teamed up with designer Tine Mollatt to create a dress collection.

== Filmography ==
- Mongoland (2001), Pia
- Buddy (2003), Henriette
- Kvinnen i mitt liv (2003), Maria
- Monstertorsdag (2004), Russian potato seller
- An Enemy of the People (2005), Petra
- 37 og et halvt (2005), Michelle
- 5 løgner (2007)
- Mars & Venus (2007), Ida
- Kodenavn Hunter (2008) (TV)
- Lønsj (2008), Heidi
- Fallen Angels (2008), Rebecca
- 90 minutes (2012), Elin
- Neste Sommer (TV series) (2014-2019), Anki
- Blind Spot (2018), Marie
- Hidden: Förstfödd (TV series) (2019), Leander
- State of Happiness (2018-2024), Ingrid Nyman
- Norsemen (TV series) (2020), Dragon Rider
- Made in Oslo (TV series) (2022), Elin
- Don't Call Me Mama (2025), Eva, It will compete for Crystal Globe at the KVIFF.
- Jo Nesbø's Harry Hole (Netflix TV Series) (2026), Rakel Fauke

== Accolades ==
Year	Award	Category	Work	Result	Ref
2025	Karlovy Vary International Film Festival	Best Actress Award	Don't Call Me Mama	Won	
