= Céline Sallette =

French actress

- Sallette in 2026
- Born: 25 April 1980 (age 46); Bordeaux, Gironde, France
- Occupation: Actress
- Years active: 1996–present
- Children: 2

Céline Sallette (born 25 April 1980) is a French actress.

== Career ==
In 2012, she was nominated for the César Award for Most Promising Actress for her performance in House of Tolerance.

In 2016, she was a member of the jury for the Un Certain Regard section of the 2016 Cannes Film Festival.

In 2017 she gained critical success with her interpretation of the role of "Masha" in Les Trois Soeurs by Simon Stone at Odéon-Théâtre de l'Europe

== Personal life ==
She is in a relationship with director Laurent Laffargue, with whom she has a daughter named Alice.

== Filmography ==
Year	Title	Role	Notes
1996	Les Trois manteaux		Short film
2006	Murderers	Lizzy	
2006	Marie Antoinette	Lady in Waiting	
2007	Chez Maupassant	Céleste	TV series
2007	Room of Death	Annabelle	
2008	Figaro	Suzanne	TV movie
2008	The Great Alibi	Marthe	
2009	L'école du pouvoir	Laure de Cigy	TV movie
2009	La Grande vie	Aurélia	
2010	Frères	Juliette	TV movie
2010	Hereafter	Secretary	
2010	Femme de personne	La sœur	Short film
2010	Le Mystère	Sophie	
2011	The Night Clerk	Julie Couvreur	
2011	House of Tolerance	Clotilde	Lumière Award for Most Promising Actress; Nominated—César Award for Most Promising Actress
2011	A Burning Hot Summer	Élisabeth	
2011	Dans la tourmente	Laure	
2011	Ici-bas	Sœur Luce	
2012	Rust and Bone	Louise	
2012	Le Capital	Maud Baron	
2012–2015	The Returned	Julie	TV series
2013	A Castle in Italy	Jeanne	
2013	Le verrou		Short film
2013	La Femme de Rio	Audrey	Short film
2013	One of a Kind	Nina	
2013	Hélène Berr, une jeune fille dans Paris occupé		Documentary film (voice)
2014	Un voyage	Claire	
2014	Geronimo	Geronimo	
2014	Wild Life	Nora (Carole Garcia)	
2014	The Connection	Jacqueline Michel	
2014	Mademoiselle	The brunette	Short film
2015	Orson Welles: Shadows & Light	Narrator (French version)	Documentary film
2015	Les Rois du monde	Chantal	
2015	Looking for Her	Elisa Bérard	
2015	Tsunami	Aline	
2016	Saint-Amour	Venus	
2016	Cessez-le-feu	Hélène	
2017	Corporate	Emilie	
2017	Golden Years	Louise	
2017	The Man with the Iron Heart	Marie Moravec	
2018	One Nation, One King	Louise Audu	
2019	Mais vous êtes fous	Camille Clémenti	
2019	Magari	Charlotte	
2020	Une belle équipe	Stephanie	
2020	Rouge	Emma	
2021	Les Fantasmes	Lisa	
2022	Tropique de la violence	Marie	
2022	Brillantes	Karine	
2022	Petites	The judge	
2023	Les Algues vertes	Ines	

== Other awards ==
- 2013: Prix Romy Schneider
