= Corporate (2017 film) =

- Directed by: Nicolas Silhol
- Written by: Nicolas Silhol; Nicolas Fleureau
- Starring: Céline Sallette; Lambert Wilson; Stéphane De Groodt
- Release date: 5 April 2017
- Running time: 95 minutes
- Country: France
- Language: French

Corporate is a French thriller film released on 5 April 2017, that was written and directed by Nicolas Silhol.

Filming took place in February 2016, mainly in the Rhône department in Lyon in the Brotteaux district (notably on the ground floor and staircases of the Lugdunum, the building that houses the DREAL), as well as in Chamonix in Haute-Savoie.

== Plot ==
Émilie Tesson-Hansen is a brilliant and cold personnel manager at Esen, an industrial food group. One of her team members has been repeatedly trying to meet with her. He finally accosts her in the street where she tells him that he is not wanted and should quit. Soon after, he kills himself by jumping off of the building. An investigation is opened by a labor inspector. Considered to be at fault in the eyes of the director of human resources and her superiors, Emilie decides to avoid prison and save her skin. She reveals to the investigator the pernicious harassment methods and workplace bullying practiced at Esen.

== Cast ==
- Céline Sallette as Émilie Tesson-Hansen
- Lambert Wilson as Stéphane Froncart, CHRO
- Violaine Fumeau as Marie Borrel, l'inspectrice de travail
- Stéphane De Groodt as Vincent
- Charlie Anson as Colin Hansen, Émilie's husband
- Alice de Lencquesaing as Sophie, Émilie's assistant
- Camille Japy as Catherine, a colleague
- Hyam Zaytoun as Patricia Suarez, Froncart's assistant
- Jacques Chambon as CFO
- Arnaud Bedouët as Jean-Louis Maury
- Xavier De Guillebon as Didier Dalmat
- Edith Saulnier as Juliette Dalmat, Didier's daughter
- Nathalie Sportiello as CCO
- Pierre-Loup Silhol as Léo Hansen
- Yun Lai as a Korean businessman

== Reception ==
In France, the film got critical acclaim. A critic, Florence Vasca, in AngersMag wrote, "the film is asking where is the limit of a human being when his career is at stake."
