= Romane Bohringer =

French actress (born 1973)

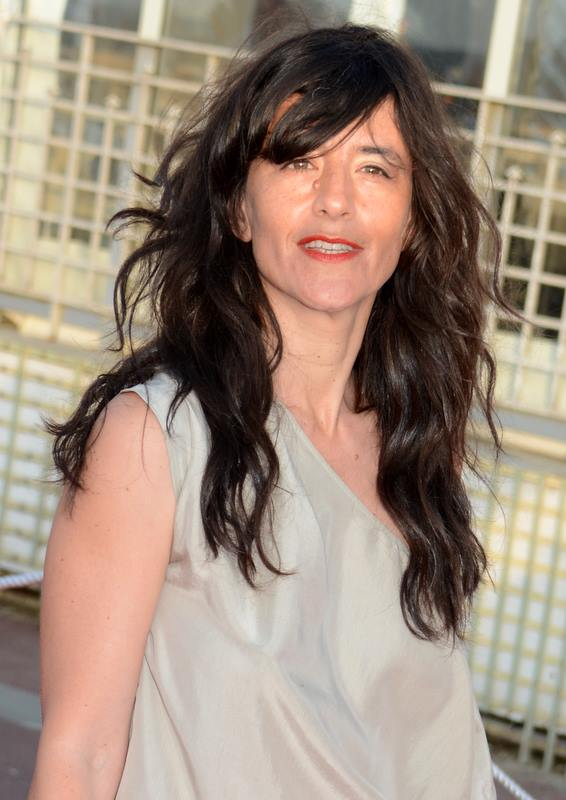
- Bohringer at the 2014 Cabourg Film Festival
- Born: 14 August 1973 (age 52); Pont-Sainte-Maxence, Oise, France
- Awards: Most Promising Actress; 1993 Savage Nights

Romane Bohringer (French: [ʁɔman bɔʁɛ̃ʒe]; born 14 August 1973) is a French actress, film director, screenwriter, and costume designer. She is the daughter of Richard Bohringer and sister of Lou Bohringer. Her parents named her after Roman Polanski.

She won the César Award for Most Promising Actress for her role in Savage Nights.

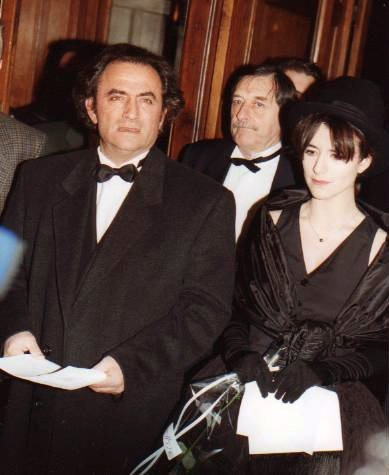
Romane Bohringer (right) with her father at the 1993 César award ceremony.

== Filmography ==
=== Actress ===
Year	Title	Role	Notes
1986	Kamikaze	Julie	
1991	Ragazzi	Romane	
1992	Savage Nights	Laura	César Award for Most Promising Actress
1992	The Accompanist	Sophie Vasseur	
1994	A Cause d'Elle	Francoise	
1994	Le Colonel Chabert	Sophie	
1995	Total Eclipse	Mathilde Maute	
1995	Mina Tannenbaum	Mina Tannenbaum	
1996	L'Appartement	Alice	
1997	Shooting Star	Juliette	
1997	The Chambermaid on the Titanic	Zoe	
1998	Organic	Marguerite	
1998	Vigo - Passion for Life	Lydu Lozinska	
1999	One Hundred and One Nights		
1999	Portraits Chinois	Lise	
1999	Rembrandt	Hendrickje Stoffels	
2000	The King Is Alive	Catherine	
2001	Le Petit Poucet		
2001	He Died with a Felafel in His Hand	Anya	
2004	Le Triporteur de Belleville (TV)	Marie Chabaud	
2006	A City Is Beautiful at Night	Romane	
2006	Qui m'aime me suive	Anna	
2006	Lili and the Baobab	Lili	
2009	The Ball of the Actresses	Herself	
2009	Blanche Maupas	Blanche Maupas	
2012	Renoir	Gabrielle	
2013	Vic and Flo Saw a Bear	Florence Richemont	
2014	False Witness		
2015	Les Rois du monde	Marie-Jo	
2018	Knife+Heart	Cathy Vannier	

=== Director ===
Year	Title	Notes
2005	Ti tengu caru	Short film
2018	L'amour flou	
2018	Blurred Love	TV series
2025	Tell Her That I Love Her	

=== Voice ===
Year	Title	Role	Notes
2005	March of the Penguins; La Marche de l'empereur	Mère	
