= Out of Love (2025 film) =

French drama film by Nathan Ambrosioni

- Promotional poster
- French: Les enfants vont bien
- Directed by: Nathan Ambrosioni
- Written by: Nathan Ambrosioni
- Produced by: Nicolas Dumont; Hugo Sélignac
- Starring: Camille Cottin; Juliette Armanet; Monia Chokri
- Cinematography: Victor Seguin
- Edited by: Nathan Ambrosioni
- Music by: Alexandre de La Baume
- Production companies: Chi-Fou-Mi Productions; France 2 Cinéma; StudioCanal
- Distributed by: StudioCanal
- Release dates: 5 July 2025 (KVIFF); 3 December 2025 (France)
- Running time: 110 minutes
- Country: France
- Language: French

Out of Love (French: Les enfants vont bien, lit. 'The children are doing well') is a 2025 French drama film written and directed by Nathan Ambrosioni. The film starring Camille Cottin, Juliette Armanet and Monia Chokri follows Jeanne and her sister Suzanne who suddenly disappears. It is a family drama with some thriller elements, focusing on the relationship between sisters and the challenges of unexpected parenthood.

It premiered at 59th Karlovy Vary International Film Festival on 5 July 2025, competing for Crystal Globe. It will be subsequently released in the French cinemas by StudioCanal on 3 December 2025.

== Cast ==
- Camille Cottin as Jeanne
- Juliette Armanet as Suzanne
- Monia Chokri as Nicole
- Manoâ Varvat
- Nina Birman
- Guillaume Gouix
- Féodor Atkine
- Frankie Wallach
- Myriem Akheddiou
- Tania Dessources

== Production ==
The film is produced by Chi-Fou-Mi Productions, in co-production with France 2 Cinéma and StudioCanal. It was pre-purchased by Canal+ S.A., Ciné+ and France Télévisions. Filming began on 14 October 2024, and was wrapped up on 13 December 2024.

== Release ==
Out of Love had its premiere at 59th Karlovy Vary International Film Festival on 5 July 2025, where it competes for Crystal Globe with other eleven feature films. It will be released theatrically on 3 December 2025.

It was screened in Open Horizons at the Thessaloniki International Film Festival on 31 October 2025. It competed in Golden Olive tree Competition at the Lecce European Film Festival on 18 November 2025.

== Reception ==
The film is among the 12 most anticipated French feature films of 2025 according to Vogue France.

Fabien Lemercier reviewing the film at the Karlovy Vary International Film Festival for Cineuropa wrote, that it is a "sensitive and moving film" directed by Nathan Ambrosioni, who made it "subtle and poignant" with his "delicate approach", and "sober yet sophisticated mise en scène style." Lemercier praised Camille Cottin for her performance and Alexandre de la Baume for music.

Wendy Ide reviewing the film at the Karlovy Vary International Film Festival for ScreenDaily praised the performance of Camille Cottin and cinematography of Victor Seguin for "eloquently framing and shooting the delicate nuances of the performances." Praising the director she wrote, "Nathan Ambrosioni’s film is a quiet yet heartfelt exploration, gently portraying a woman navigating an unexpected role with subtle, nuanced performances."

== Accolades ==
Year	Award	Category	Recipient(s)	Result	Ref
2025	Karlovy Vary International Film Festival	Crystal Globe Grand Prix	Out of Love	Nominated	
2025	Karlovy Vary International Film Festival	FIPRESCI Award for Crystal Globe Competition	Nathan Ambrosioni	Won	
2025	Karlovy Vary International Film Festival	Best Director Award	Nathan Ambrosioni	Won	
