= 59th Karlovy Vary International Film Festival =

Film festival in Czech Republic

- Official poster
- Opening film: We've Got to Frame It! by Milan Kuchynka, Jakub Jurásek
- Location: Karlovy Vary, Czech Republic
- Founded: 1946
- Awards: Crystal Globe: Better Go Mad in the Wild
- Artistic director: Karel Och
- No. of films: 175
- Festival date: Opening: 4 July 2025; Closing: 12 July 2025
- Website: www.kviff.com/en/homepage

Karlovy Vary International Film Festival
- 60th 58th

The 59th Karlovy Vary International Film Festival opened on 4 July 2025, in Karlovy Vary, Czech Republic with a film by Milan Kuchynka and Jakub Jurásek, We've Got to Frame It!, a tribute to Jiří Bartoška, the late president of the festival. 'Midnight Screenings' section from this year have a new name "Afterhours" under revamped programme.

On 3 June, the festival revealed 11 films selected for its main Crystal Globe Competition, including nine world premieres and two international premieres. On 20 June, the festival revealed its complete line-up for the 59th edition, expanding upon the previously announced competition sections.

The festival paid tribute to 1940s American film star and pioneering method actor John Garfield, while presenting its prestigious President's Award to Czech film editor Jiří Brožek for his outstanding contribution to Czech cinema. Vicky Krieps, Peter Sarsgaard, and Dakota Johnson were also honored with the KVIFF President's Award for their achievements in films. The special feature of this edition was the world premiere on 9 July of a cinematic cut of Warhorse Studios’ video game – Kingdom Come: Deliverance II Cinematic Cut, directed by Daniel Vávra and Petr Pekař, in Special Screenings section. The festival wrapped up after showcasing 175 films across 465 screenings. The lineup featured 108 fiction features, 23 documentaries, and 44 short films. Out of these, 36 had their world premiere, while five debuted internationally and another five had their first screening in Europe.

The festival concluded on 12 July with midnight film screenings and the presentation of awards in both non-statutory and main competition categories. Better Go Mad in the Wild, a Czech-Slovak documentary directed by Miro Remo, received the Crystal Globe, while Sand City, a Bangladeshi drama by Mahde Hasan, was awarded the PROXIMA Grand Prix.

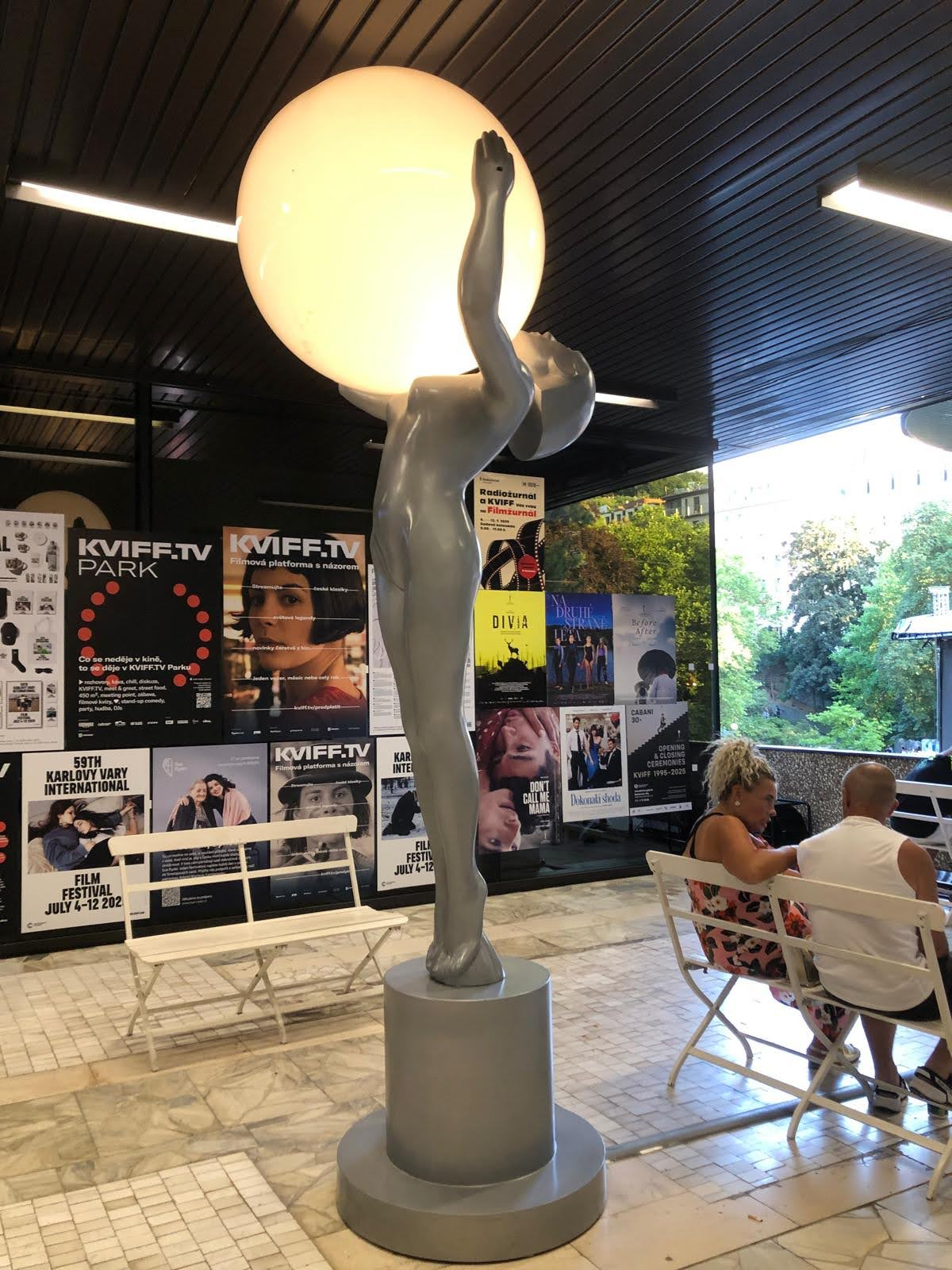
59th Karlovy Vary International Film Festival

== Events ==
=== Opening ceremony ===
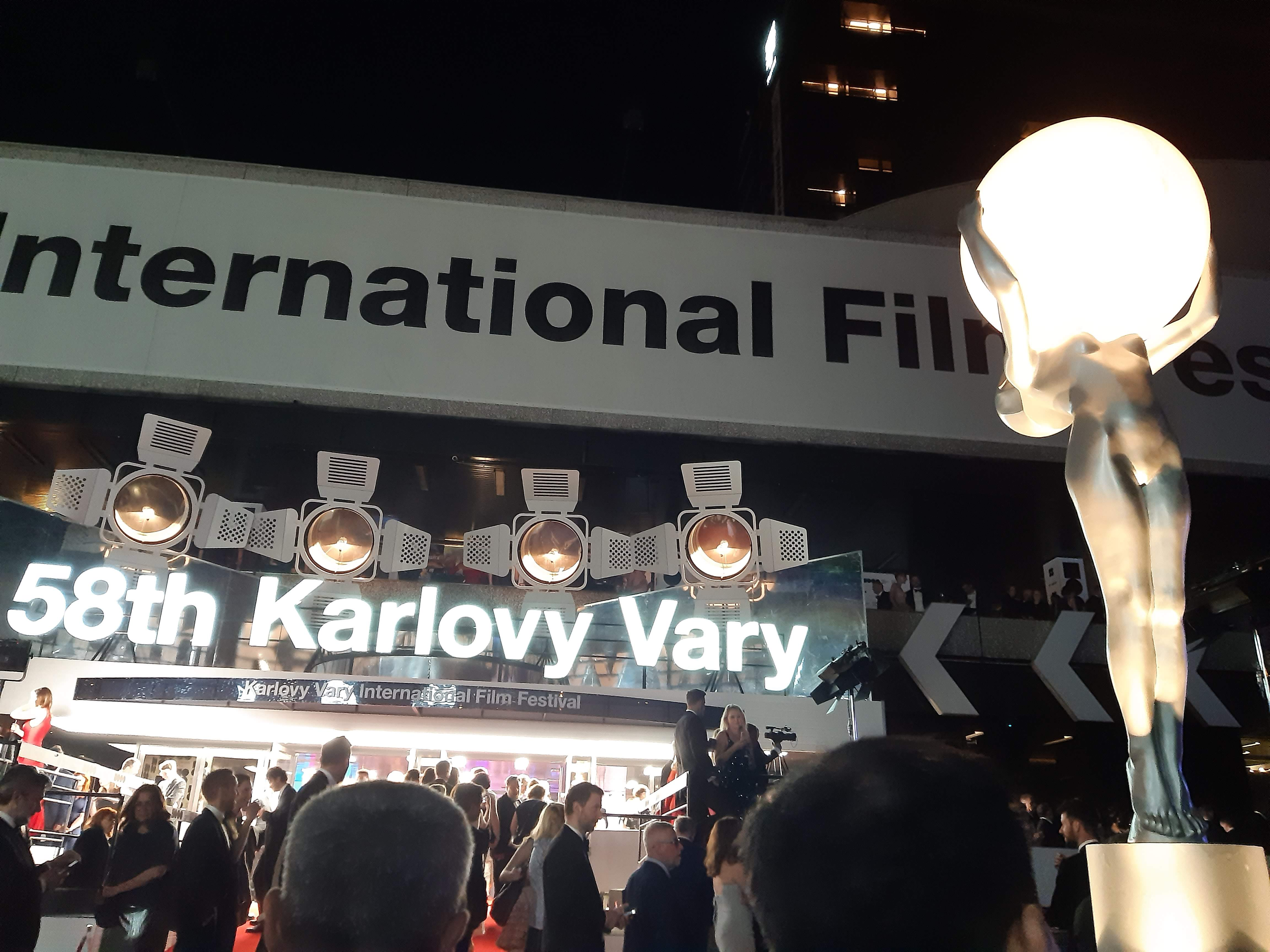
59th Karlovy Vary International Film Festival

The festival's opening ceremony was held on July 4 in the Grand Hall of the Thermal Hotel. It was streamed live on KVIFF.TV. This year, the platform also streamed the opening film We Gotta Frame It!, as a tribute to Jiří Bartoška by Milan Kuchynka and Jakub Jurásek. Vicky Krieps and Peter Sarsgaard were presented with KVIFF President's Award.

=== Surprise Karlovy Vary Award to Michael Douglas ===
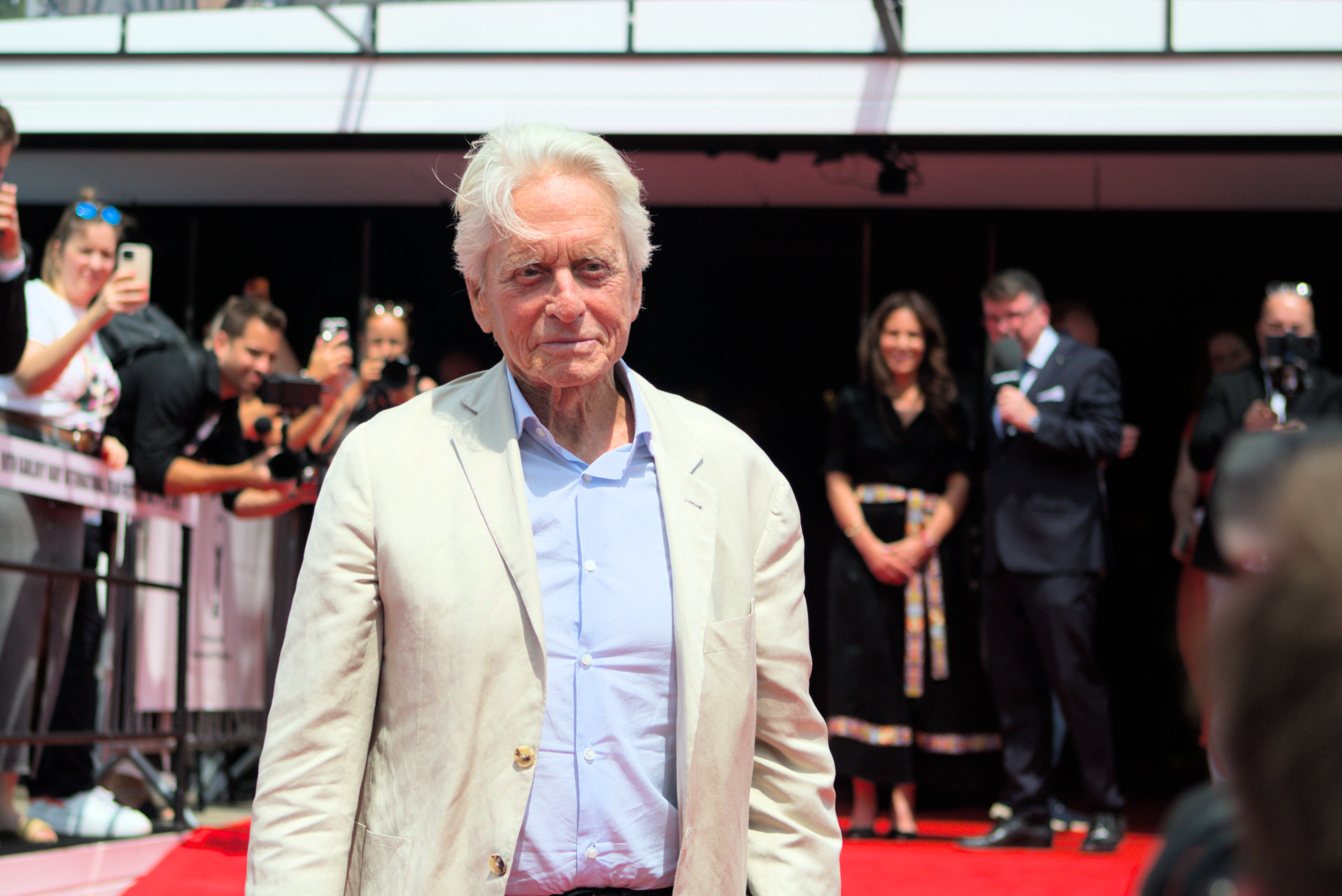
Michael Douglas attending the Festival on 5 July

After presenting a restored screening of Miloš Forman’s 1975 American psychological comedy-drama film One Flew Over the Cuckoo's Nest, the co-producer Michael Douglas was surprised with a modern Crystal Globe statuette by the festival executive director Kryštof Mucha, replacing the earlier, awkward-to-hold version he had originally received in 1998 for Outstanding Contribution to World Cinema.

=== Closing ceremony ===
The festival closed by midnight screenings of the following films:

- The Texas Chain Saw Massacre, by Tobe Hooper, 1974 cult horror classic.
- Dangerous Animals, by Sean Byrne, a 2025 Australian film.
- Shoah, 1985 French documentary film, over nine hours long by Claude Lanzmann.

Later the winners of the non-statutory jury awards were announced. All broadcast live was available on ČT1, with red carpet arrivals on KVIFF.TV. Before announcement of the winners in the main competition categories, the Crystal Globes was presented to Jiří Brožek, and the Crystal Globe for Outstanding Artistic Contribution to World Cinema was awarded to the actor Stellan Skarsgård.

== Juries ==
=== Crystal Globe Competition ===
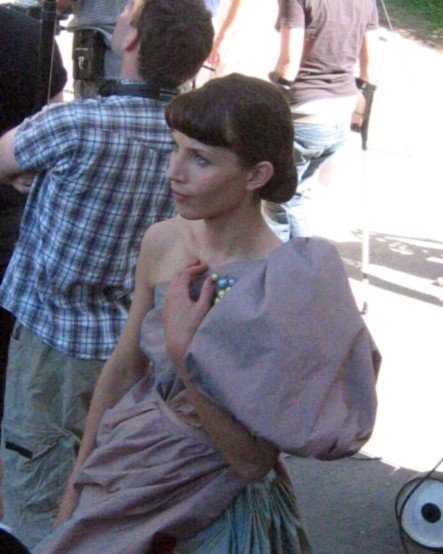
Tuva Novotny, Jury Member

- Nicolás Celis, a Mexican film producer.
- Babak Jalali, an Iranian–British film director and producer
- Jessica Kiang, film critic and Berlinale selector
- Jiří Mádl, a Czech film actor, director and screenwriter
- Tuva Novotny, a Swedish actress and director

=== Proxima Competition jury ===
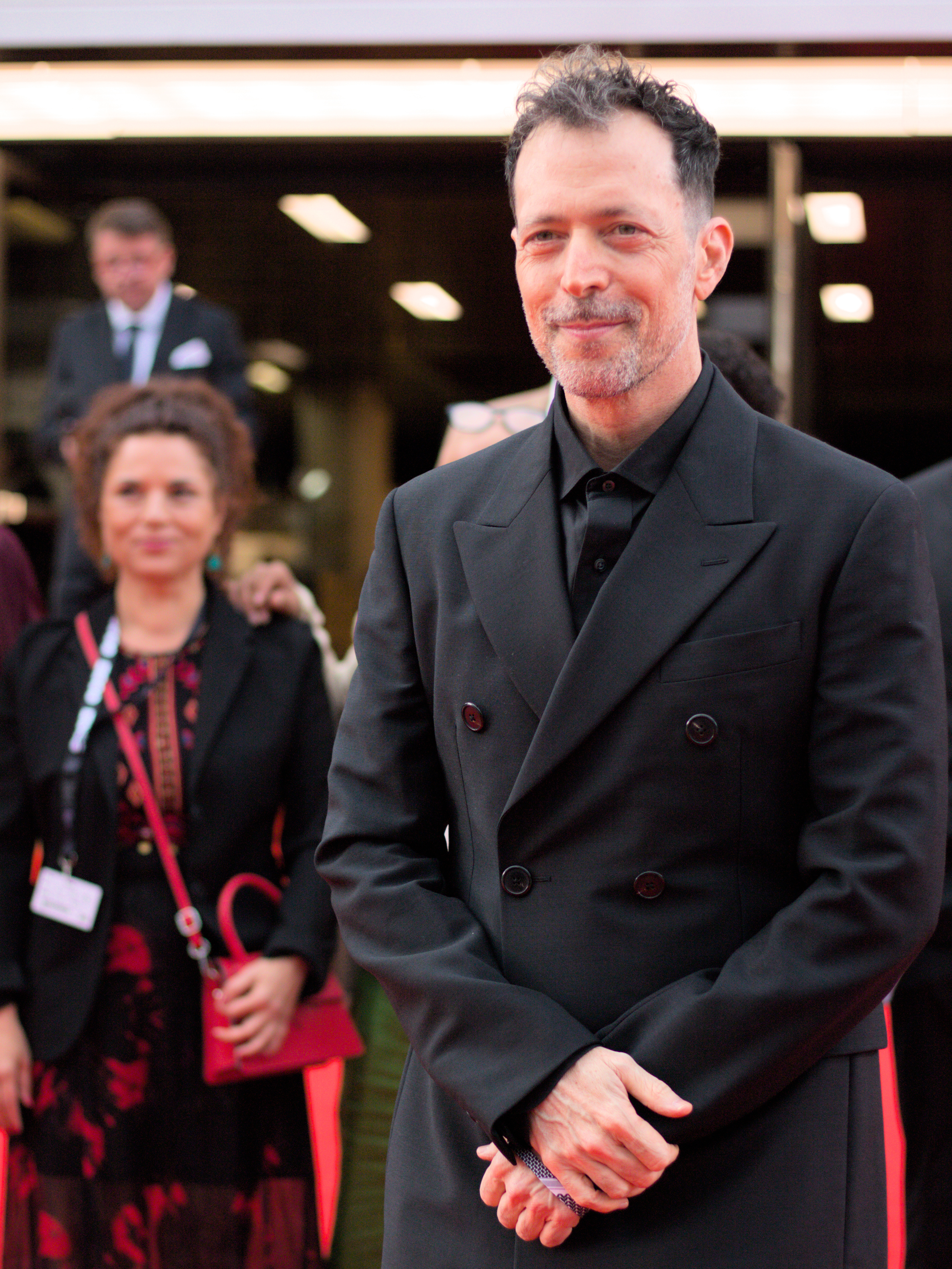
Noaz Deshe, Jury Member

- Yulia Evina Bhara, an Indonesian film and theatre producer
- Noaz Deshe, Berlin-based, Romanian film director
- Nelson Carlos De Los Santos Arias, Dominican filmmaker
- Jakub Felcman, Czech screenwriter
- Marissa Frobes, Creative Artists Agency, agent

== Official selection ==
The festival has following sections:

- Crystal Globe
- Proxima Competition
- Special Screenings
- Horizons
- Imagina
- Future Frames: Generation Next of European Cinema

=== Crystal Globe ===
Highlighted title and double-dagger (‡) indicates Crystal Globe winner.
Highlighted title and double-dagger (‡) indicates Special Jury Prize winner.

Eleven of the twelve titles in the Crystal Globe Competition have been announced. The remaining film, from Iran, was revealed on 25 June to ensure the safety of its creators. The name of the 12th film from Iran was revealed as Outcry by Soheil Beiraghi.

English title	Original title	Director(s)	Production countrie(s)
Better Go Mad in the Wild ‡	Raději zešílet v divočině	Miro Remo	Czech Republic, Slovakia
Outcry ‡	Bidad	Soheil Beiraghi	Iran
Broken Voices	Sbormistr	Ondřej Provazník	Czech Republic, Slovakia
Cinema Jazireh		Gözde Kural	Turkey, Iran, Bulgaria, Romania
Divia		Dmytro Hreshko	Poland Ukraine, Netherlands, United States
Don't Call Me Mama	Se meg	Nina Knags	Norway
Jimmy Jaguár		Benedek Fliegauf	Hungary
The Luminous Life	A Vida Luminosa	João Rosas	Portugal, France
Out of Love	Les Enfants vont bien	Nathan Ambrosioni	France
Rebuilding		Max Walker-Silverman	United States
The Visitor	Svečias	Vytautas Katkus	Lithuania, Norway, Sweden
When a River Becomes the Sea	Quan un riu esdevé el mar	Pere Vila Barceló	Spain

=== Proxima Competition ===
Highlighted title and double-dagger (‡) indicates Proxima Competition winner.

English title	Original title	Director(s)	Production countrie(s)
Action Item	Neplatené voľno	Paula Ďurinová	Slovak Republic, Czech Republic, Germany
The Anatomy of the Horses	La anatomía de los caballos	Daniel Vidal Toche	Spain, Peru, Colombia, France
Before / After	Avant /Après	Manoël Dupont	Belgium
Forensics	Forenses	Federico Atehortúa Arteaga	Colombia
Future Future	Futuro Futuro	Davi Pretto	Brazil
How Come It's All Green Out Here?	Kako je ovde tako zeleno?	Nikola Ležaić	Serbia, Croatia, Bulgaria
The Other Side of Summer	Na druhé straně léta	Vojtěch Strakatý	Czech Republic
Rain Fell on the Nothing New	Regen fiel auf nichts Neues	Steffen Goldkamp	Germany
Renovation	Renovacija	Gabrielė Urbonaitė	Lithuania, Latvia, Belgium
Sand City ‡	বালুর নগরীতে	Mahde Hasan	Bangladesh
They Come Out of Margo	Vgainoun mesa ap ti Margo	Alexander Voulgaris	Greece
TrepaNation		Ammar Al-Beik	Syria, Germany
Thus Spoke the Wind	Ayspes asatc qamin	Maria Rigel	Armenia

=== Special Screenings ===
The world premiere of Serbian miniseries Absolute 100 will be highlight of Special screening in this edition.

English title	Original title	Director(s)	Production countrie(s)
Absolute 100		Srdan Golubović, Stefan Ivančić, Katarina Mutić, Nikola Stojanović	Serbia
All That's Left of You	اللي باقي منك	Cherien Dabis	Germany, Cyprus, Palestine, Jordan, Greece, Qatar, Saudi Arabia
Caravan	Karavan	Zuzana Kirchnerová	Czech Republic, Slovakia, Italy
The Czech Film Project		Marek Novák, Mikuláš Novotný	Czech Republic
Dragonfly		Paul Andrew Williams	United Kingdom
Duchoň		Peter Bebjak	Slovakia, Czech Republic
Promise, I'll Be Fine	Hore je nebo, v doline som ja	Katarína Gramatová	Slovak Republic, Czech Republic
A Second Life		Laurent Slama	France
Summer School, 2001	Letní škola, 2001	Dužan Duong	Czech Republic, Slovakia
Tehran Another View	Tehran, Kenarat	Ali Behrad	Iran, United Kingdom
Kingdom Come: Deliverance II Cinematic Cut		Daniel Vávra and Petr Pekař	Czech Republic

=== Horizons ===
English title	Original title	Director(s)	Production countrie(s)
2000 Meters to Andriivka		Mstyslav Chernov	Ukraine
About a Hero	Σχετικά μ' έναν ήρωα	Piotr Winiewicz	Denmark, United States
April	აპრილი	Dea Kulumbegashvili	Georgia, France, Italy
Ariel		Lois Patiño	Spain, Portugal
The Baltimorons		Jay Duplass	United States
The Blue Trail	O Último Azul	Gabriel Mascaro	Brazil, Mexico, Chile, Netherlands
Deaf	Sorda	Eva Libertad	Spain
Dreams		Michel Franco	Mexico, United States
Dreams (Sex Love)	Drømmer	Dag Johan Haugerud	Norway
Feeling Better	Nonostante	Valerio Mastandrea	Italy
Forbidden City	La città proibita	Gabriele Mainetti	Italy
Girls on Wire	想飞的女孩	Vivian Qu	China
The Good Doctor		Gianluca Matarrese	France, Italy, Switzerland
Christy		Brendan Canty	United Kingdom, Ireland
If I Had Legs I'd Kick You		Mary Bronstein	United States
It Was Just an Accident	یک تصادف ساده	Jafar Panahi	Iran, France, Luxembourg
Kika		Alexe Poukine	Belgium, France
Kill the Jockey	El jockey	Luis Ortega	Argentina, Mexico, Spain, Denmark, United States
Kontinental '25		Radu Jude	Romania, Brazil, Switzerland, United Kingdom, Luxembourg
Lesbian Space Princess		Emma Hough Hobbs, Leela Varghese	Australia
A Letter to David	Dopis pro Davida	Tom Shoval	Israel, United States
Little Trouble Girls	Kaj ti je deklica	Urška Djukić	Slovenia, Italy, Croatia, Serbia
The Love That Remains	Ástin Sem Eftir Er	Hlynur Pálmason	Iceland, Denmark, France, Finland, Sweden
Mad Bills to Pay (or Destiny, dile que no soy malo)		Joel Alfonso Vargas	United States
Madly		Paolo Genovese	Italy
My Father's Shadow		Akinola Davies Jr.	United Kingdom, Nigeria, Ireland
My Undesirable Friends: Part I — Last Air in Moscow		Julia Loktev	United States
Peter Hujar's Day		Ira Sachs	
Put Your Soul on Your Hand and Walk		Sepideh Farsi	France, Palestine, Iran
Renoir	ルノワール	Chie Hayakawa	Japan, Australia, France, Singapore, Philippines, Indonesia
Siblings	La vita da grandi	Greta Scarano	Italy
Sirāt		Óliver Laxe	Spain, France
Sorry, Baby		Eva Victor	United States
Sound of Falling	In die Sonne schauen	Mascha Schilinski	Germany
Tales From the Magic Garden	Pohádky Po Babičce	David Súkup, Patrik Pašš, Leon Vidmar and Jean-Claude Rozec	Czechia, Slovakia, Slovenia, France
Timestamp	Стрічка часу	Kateryna Gornostai	Ukraine, Luxembourg, Netherlands, France
Two Prosecutors	Два прокурора	Sergei Loznitsa	Latvia, France, Germany, Netherlands, Romania, Lithuania
Two Times João Liberada	Duas vezes João Liberada	Paula Tomás Marques	Portugal
Urchin		Harris Dickinson	United Kingdom
Vermiglio		Maura Delpero	Italy, France, Belgium
We Believe You	On vous croit	Arnaud Dufeys and Charlotte Devillers	Belgium
What Does That Nature Say to You	그 자연이 네게 뭐라고 하니	Hong Sang-soo	South Korea
Yes	Ken!	Nadav Lapid	Israel, France, Germany, Cyprus, United Kingdom

=== Imagina ===
English title	Original title	Director(s)	Production countrie(s)
1+1+1		Ondřej Vavrečka	Czech Republic
Archipelago of Earthen Bones – To Bunya		Malena Szlam	Canada, Australia
A Black Screen Too		Rhayne Vermette	Canada
Bluish		Lilith Kraxner, Milena Czernovsky	Austria
Bogancloch		Ben Rivers	Austria
Ghost of the Past		Bill Morrison	USA, France
How Are You?		Caroline Poggi and Jonathan Vinel	France
I Saw the Face of God in the Jet Wash		Mark Jenkin	United Kingdom
In Person Only		Tereza Vejvodová	Czech Republic
Language of the Entrails		Luciana Decker Orozco	Bolivia, United States
Little boy		James Benning	United States
Maria Henriqueta Was Here		Nuno Pimentel	Portugal
A Metamorphosis		Lin Htet Aung	Myanmar
N3G		Oliver Torr	Czech Republic
Partition		Diana Allan	Lebanon, Palestine, Canada
Perseidas		Natalia del Mar Kašik	Austria
Sleep Dreams		Anastázie Rainischová	Czech Republic
Tin City		Feargal Ward	Ireland
We Are Animals		Lorenzo Pallotta	Italy
When The Phone Rang		Iva Radivojević	Serbia, United States
Zodiac Killer Project		Charlie Shackleton	United States, United Kingdom

=== Future Frames: Generation Next of European Cinema ===
English title	Original title	Director(s)	Production countrie(s)
1:10	1:10	Sinan Taner	Switzerland
Dissection of an Incoherence in Crisis	Dissecció d’una incoherència en crisi	Nausica Serra	Spain
Dog and Wolf	Pes a vlk	Terézia Halamová	Czech Republic
Fish River Anthology	Mereneläviä	Veera Lamminpää	Finland
Greek Apricots	Grčke marelice	Jan Krevatin	Croatia, Slovenia
January	Januari	Jetske Lieber	Netherlands
Karaokiss	Karaocoeur	Mila Ryngaert	Belgium
Skin on Skin		Simon Schneckenburger	Germany
Son of Happiness	Syn szczęścia	Dominik Mirecki	Poland
We Beg to Differ		Ruairi Bradley	Ireland, United Kingdom

=== Pragueshorts ===
English title	Original title	Director(s)	Production countrie(s)
Animanimusical	Zvířomuzikál	Julia Ocker	Germany
Butterfly Girl	Ani se nenaděješ a už se jmenuješ	Ema Hůlková	Czech Republic
Crazy Lotus		Naween Noppakun	Thailand, France
Diamond Beauty		Anna Korom	Hungary
The Exploding Girl		Caroline Poggi, Jonathan Vinel	France
Hoof on Skates		Ignas Meilūnas	Lithuania
Hurikán		Jan Saska	Czech Republic, France, Slovak Republic, Bosnia and Herzegovina
I Died in Irpin		Anastasiia Falileieva	Czech Republic, Slovak Republic, Ukraine
Keep Out		Tan-Lui Chan	Czech Republic, Hong Kong,

=== Out of the Past ===
English title	Original title	Director(s)	Production countrie(s)
Barry Lyndon		Stanley Kubrick	United States, United Kingdom
Ecce Homo Homolka		Jaroslav Papoušek	Czechoslovakia,
Every Young Man		Pavel Juráček	Czechoslovakia
Gloria		John Cassavetes	United States
Chain Reactions		Alexandre O. Philippe	United States
Man Bites Dog		Rémy Belvaux, André Bonzel, Benoît Poelvoorde	Belgium
Shoah		Claude Lanzmann	France
The Texas Chain Saw Massacre		Tobe Hooper	United States
Time Is Running Out and the Water Is Rising	Casu je málo a voda stúpa	Dežo Ursiny, Ivo Brachtl	Slovak Republic
The Wedding Banquet		Ang Lee	Taiwan, United States

=== Tribute to Michael Douglas ===
Michael Douglas presented restored version of the 1975 classic film One Flew Over the Cuckoo's Nest which is included in this section. Douglas was a producer along with Saul Zaentz of the Oscar winning film.

English title	Original title	Director(s)	Production countrie(s)
One Flew Over the Cuckoo's Nest		Miloš Forman	United States

=== Tribute to Stellan Skarsgård ===
English title	Original title	Director(s)	Production countrie(s)
Sentimental Value	Affeksjonsverdi	Joachim Trier	Norway, France, Denmark, Germany

=== Tribute to Vicky Krieps ===
English title	Original title	Director(s)	Production countrie(s)
Love Me Tender		Anna Cazenave Cambet	France

=== Tribute to Peter Sarsgaard ===
English title	Original title	Director(s)	Production countrie(s)
Shattered Glass		Billy Ray	United States, Canada

=== Tribute to Jiří Brožek ===
Jiří Brožek is a Czech film editor.

English title	Original title	Director(s)	Production countrie(s)
The Death of the Beautiful Deer	Smrt krásných srnců	Karel Kachyňa	Czechoslovakia

=== Tribute to Jiří Bartoška ===
Jiří Bartoška was a Czech theatre, television, and film actor and president of the Karlovy Vary International Film Festival.

English title	Original title	Director(s)	Production countrie(s)
Tiger Theory	Teorie tygra	Radek Bajgar	Czech Republic
We've Got to Frame It! (a conversation with Jiří Bartoška in July 2021)	(Musíme to zarámovat! (rozhovor s Jiřím Bartoškou v červenci 2021) / Musíme to zarámovat! (rozhovor s Jiřím Bartoškou v červenci 2021))	Milan Kuchynka, Jakub Jurásek	Czech Republic

=== The Life and Times of John Garfield ===
John Garfield was an American actor who played brooding, rebellious, working-class characters

English title	Original title	Director(s)	Production countrie(s)
Body and Soul		Robert Rossen	United States
The Breaking Point		Michael Curtiz	United States
Dust Be My Destiny		Lewis Seiler	United States
Force of Evil		Abraham Polonsky	United States
Four Daughters		Michael Curtiz	United States
He Ran All the Way		John Berry	United States
Humoresque		Jean Negulesco	United States
The Postman Always Rings Twice		Tay Garnett	United States
Pride of the Marines		Delmer Daves	United States
They Made Me a Criminal		Busby Berkeley	United States

=== Afterhours ===
This section was previously known as "Midnight Screenings".

English title	Original title	Director(s)	Production countrie(s)
Cadet	Kadet	Adilkhan Yerzhanov	Kazakhstan
Dangerous Animals	O žralocích a lidech	Sean Byrne	Australia
Dead Lover		Grace Glowicki	Canada
Hellraiser		Clive Barker	United Kingdom
Mr. Vampire		Ricky Lau	Hong Kong
Straight Outta Space		Michael Middelkoop	Netherlands

== Awards ==
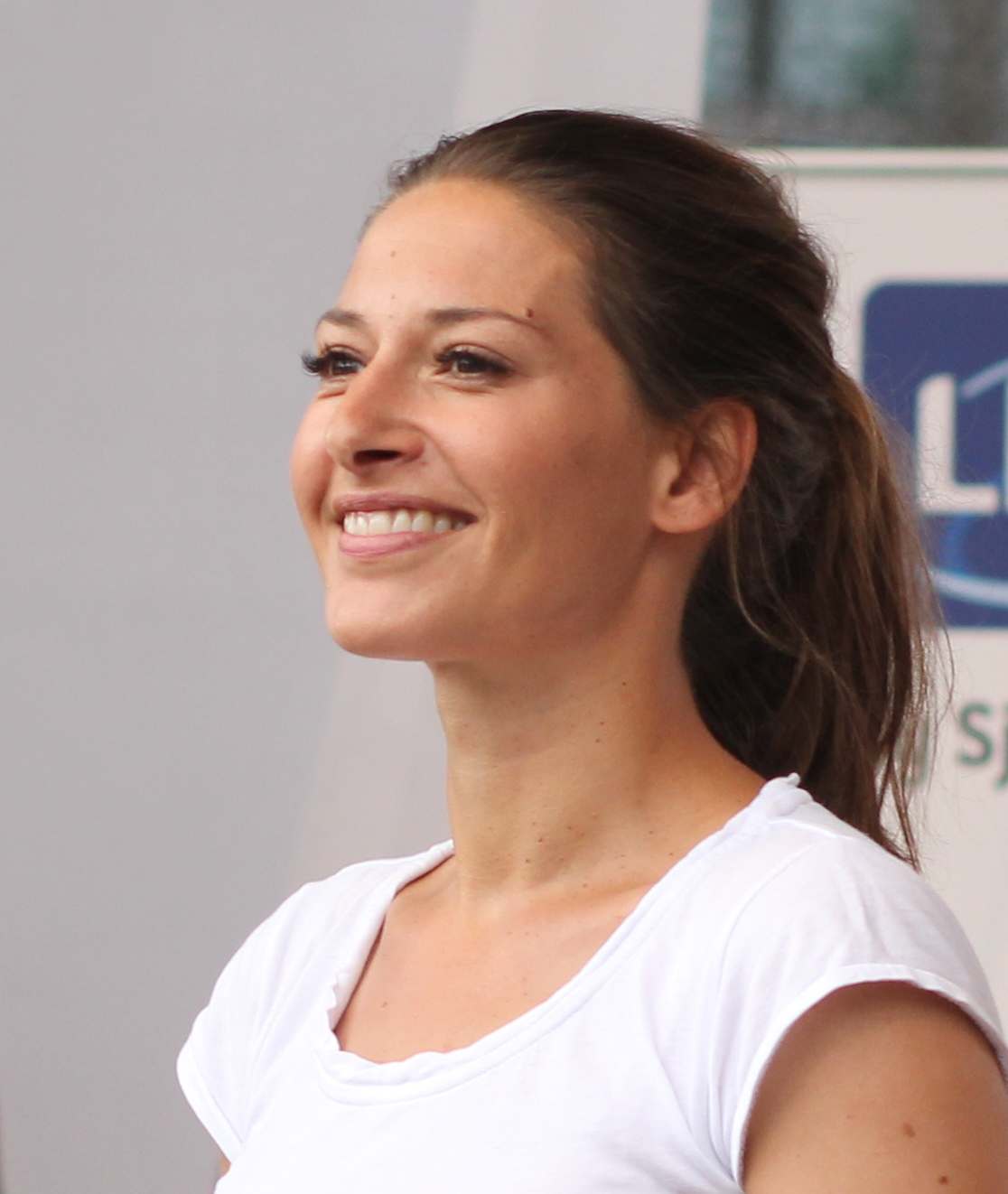
Pia Tjelta, Best Actress Award winner

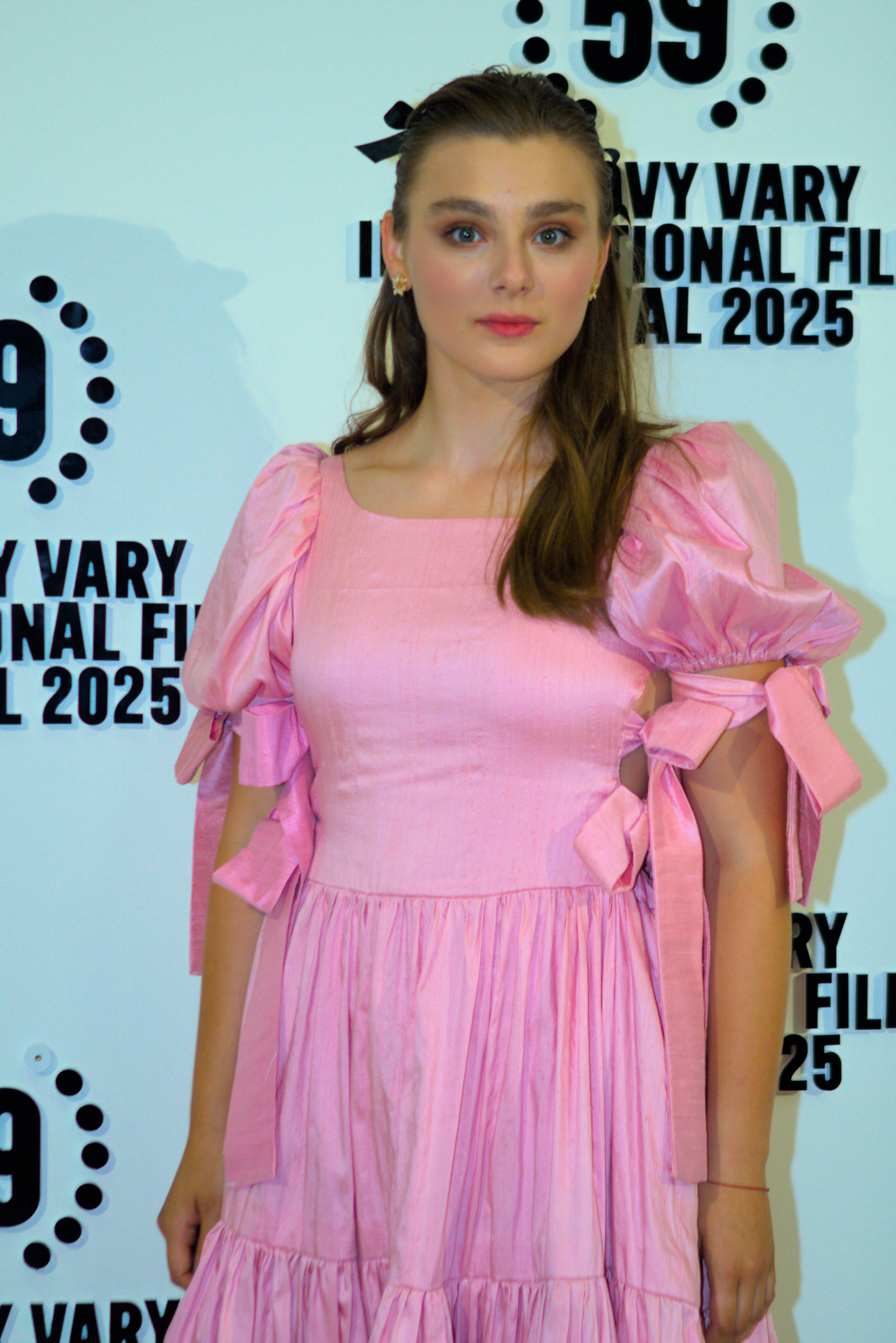
Kateřina Falbrová, winner of Special Jury Mention for Broken Voices

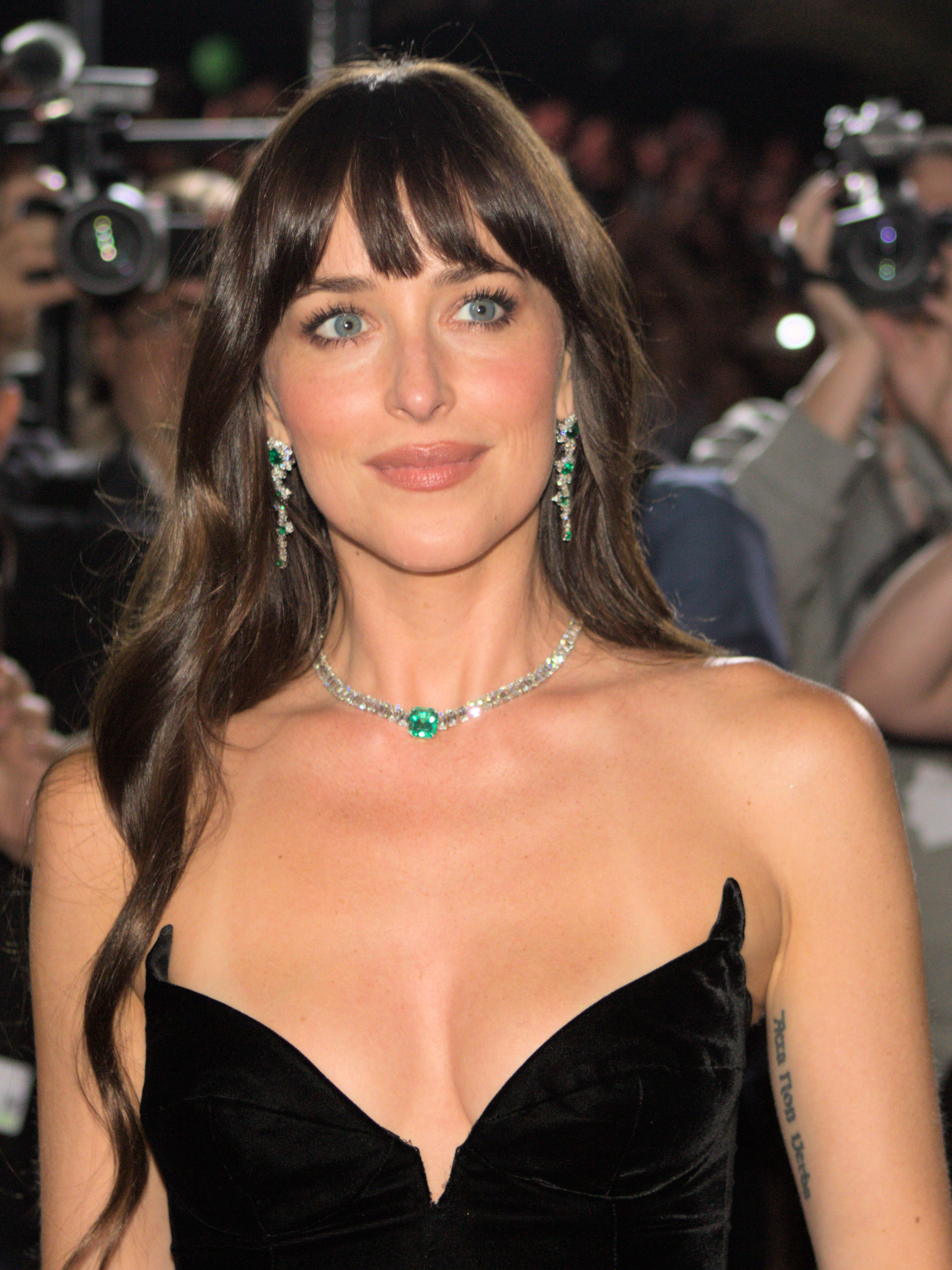
Dakota Johnson attending the festival on 7 July and co-recipient of Festival President's Award

=== Crystal Globe Competition ===
Following awards were announced at the closing ceremony of the festival:

- Grand Prix – Crystal Globe: Better Go Mad in the Wild – Miro Remo
- Special Jury Prize: Outcry – Soheil Beiraghi
- Best Director Award:
  - Nathan Ambrosioni – Out of Love
  - Vytautas Katkus – The Visitor
- Best Actress Award: Pia Tjelta – Don't Call Me Mama
- Special Jury Mention: Kateřina Falbrová – Broken Voices
- Best Actor Award: Àlex Brendemühl – When a River Becomes the Sea

=== Awards for films in the Proxima Competition ===
The following awards were presented:

- PROXIMA Grand Prix: Sand City – Mahde Hasan
- PROXIMA Special Jury Mention: Forensics – Federico Atehortúa Arteaga
- Special Mention: Before/After – Manoël Dupont
- Právo Audience Award: We've Got to Frame It! – Milan Kuchynka and Jakub Jurásek

=== Non-statutory awards ===
Non-statutory awards were announced in the evening of 12 July.

- Prize of the Ecumenical Jury: Rebuilding – Max Walker-Silverman
- Commendation of the Ecumenical Jury: Cinema Jazireh – Gözde Kural
- Europa Cinemas Label Award: Broken Voices (Sbormistr) – Ondřej Provazník
- FIPRESCI Award for Crystal Globe Competition: Out of Love (Les Enfants vont bien) – Nathan Ambrosioni
- FIPRESCI Award for PROXIMA Competition: Before/After (Avant/Après) – Manoël Dupont

=== Other awards ===
- Crystal Globe for Outstanding Artistic Contribution to World Cinema: Stellan Skarsgård

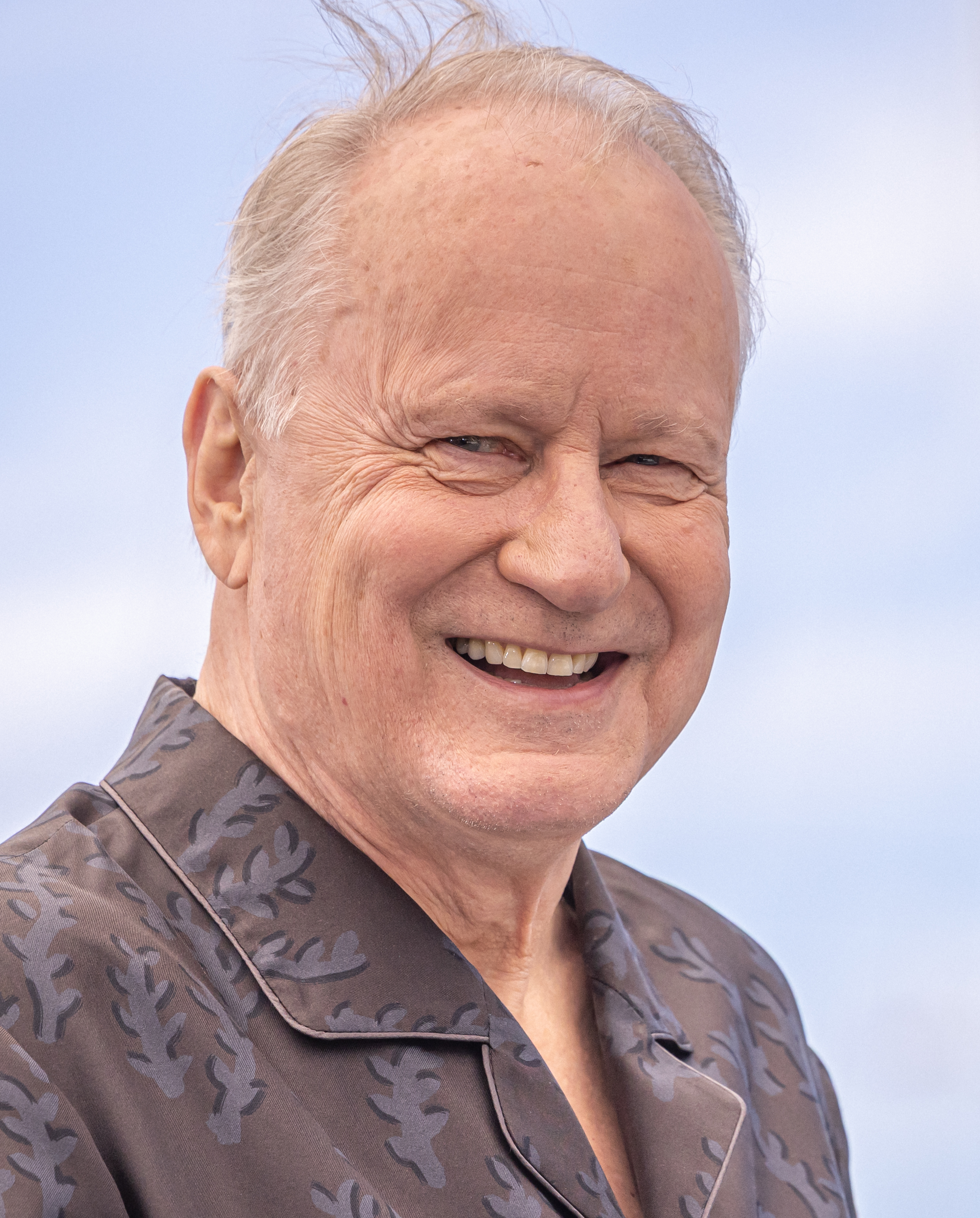
Stellan Skarsgård, recipient of Crystal Globe for Outstanding Artistic Contribution to World Cinema

- Festival President's Award:
  - Jiří Brožek
  - Dakota Johnson

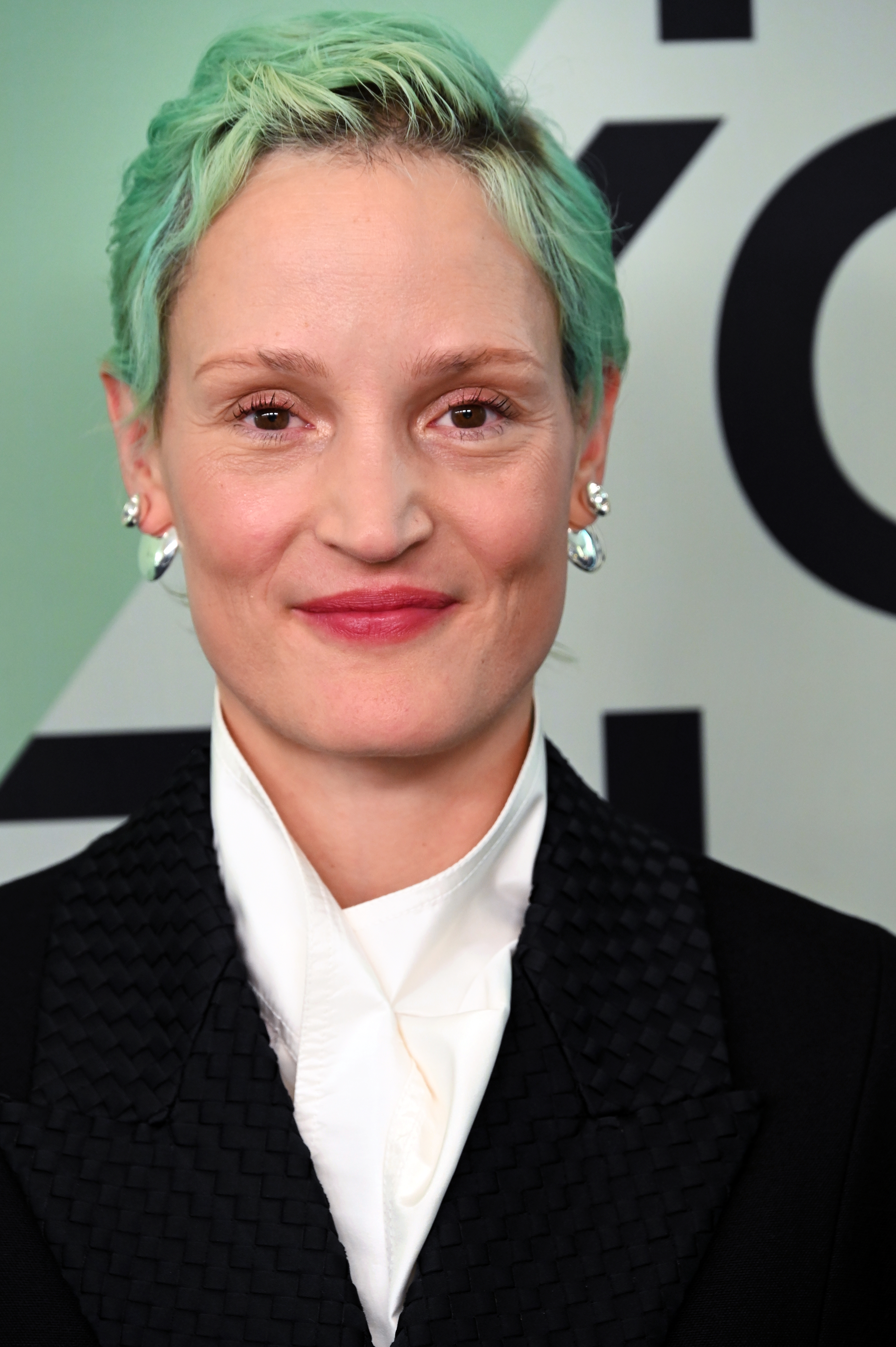
Vicky Krieps, co-recipient of Festival President's Award

  - Vicky Krieps
  - Peter Sarsgaard

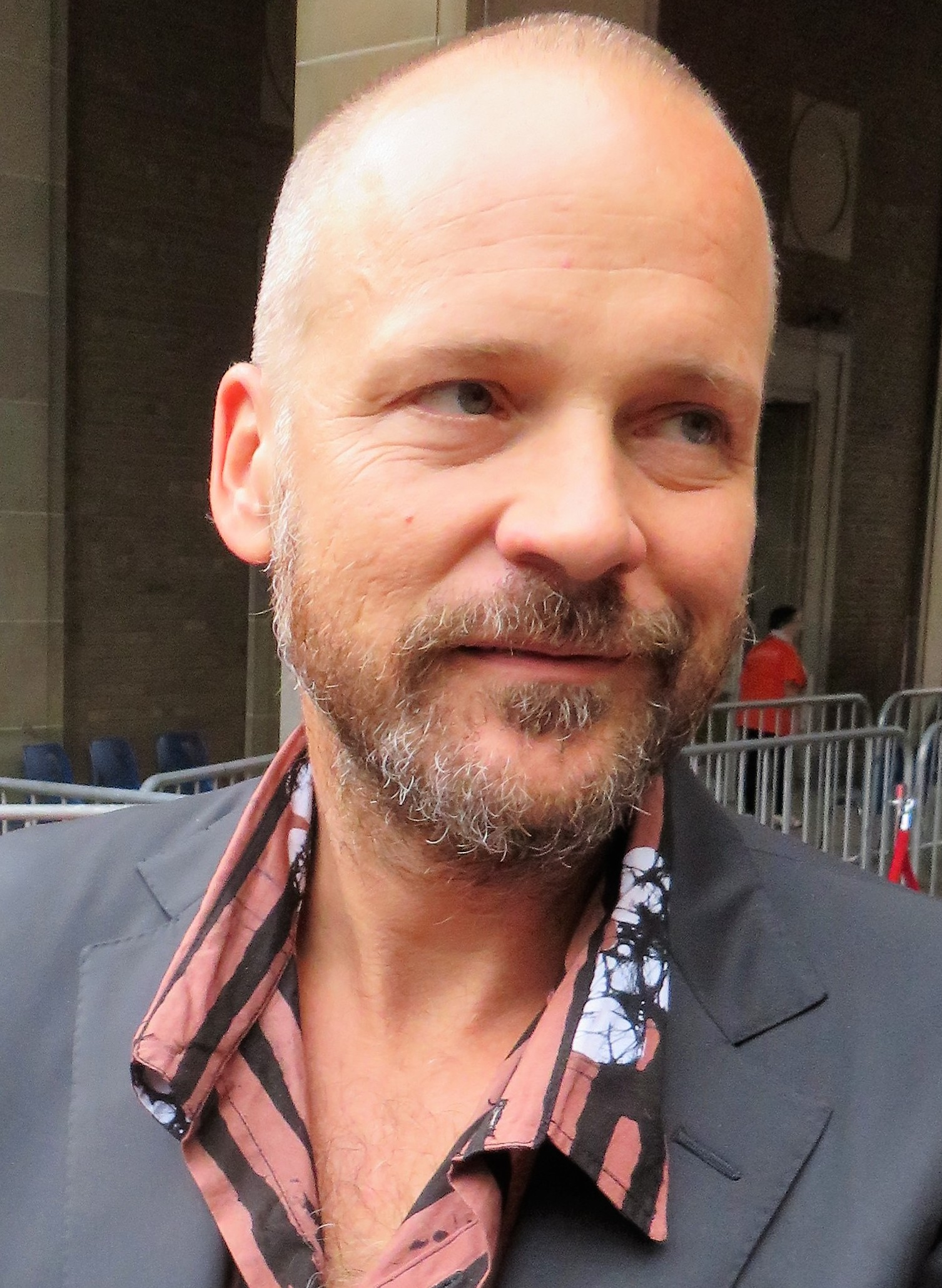
Peter Sarsgaard, co-recipient of Festival President's Award
