= Nathan Ambrosioni =

French film director

- Nathan Ambrosioni at the 2026 Cannes Film Festival
- Born: August 18, 1999 (age 27); Grasse, France
- Occupation: film director
- Years active: 2014–present

Nathan Ambrosioni (born August 18, 1999 in Grasse, Alpes-Maritimes) is a French film director.

== Career ==
With several friends, Ambrosioni directed a first feature film, the independent horror film Hostile, then another entitled Therapy. The general public discovered him in 2018 with the release of Les Drapeaux de papier, with Noémie Merlant and Guillaume Gouix; the film traces the difficult relationships between a man just released from prison and his younger sister. Although he had no contacts or professional experience in cinema when he began directing the film, Nathan Ambrosioni became the youngest director to benefit from the advance on receipts. “Nathan Ambrosioni: journey of a gifted child”, wrote Première magazine when the film was released in 2019, for which he wrote the screenplay at the age of 16.

In 2022, Ambrosioni began filming his second feature film, Toni, en famille, performed in particular by Camille Cottin, released in France on September 6, 2023, and which won the best film prize at the Festival du Film de Demain.

== Other activities ==
In 2023, Ambrosioni was announced as a member of the jury for the sixth edition of the Dinan Film Courts Festival, from November 15 to 19, 2023. In 2026, he is a guest at the San Diego French Film Festival. In 2026, he served on the jury of the Biarritz Film Festival – Nouvelles Vagues, presided over by Kristen Stewart.

== Filmography ==
As director

Year	Title	Notes	Ref.
2018	Les Drapeaux de papier (Paper Flags) (French: Les Drapeaux de papier)	Debut feature film	
2023	Toni, en famille (Toni, with family) (French: Toni, en famille)	Feature film	
2025	Out of Love (French: Les Enfants vont bien)	It had its premiere at 59th Karlovy Vary International Film Festival on 5 July	

== Awards ==
- Samain of fantastic cinema of Nice : Best director
- Angers European First Film Festival 2022 : Prize of public
- 2025 – Best Director Award at the 59th Karlovy Vary International Film Festival for Out of Love.
