= When a River Becomes the Sea =

- Catalan: Quan un riu esdevé el mar
- Directed by: Pere Vilà Barceló
- Screenplay by: Pere Vilà Barceló; Laura Merino
- Produced by: Xavier Pérez Díaz
- Starring: Claud Hernández; Àlex Brendemühl; Laia Marull; Bruna Cusí
- Cinematography: Ciril Barba
- Edited by: Xavier Pérez Díaz, Pere Vilà Barceló
- Music by: Jonathan Darch
- Production company: Fromzero
- Release date: 8 July 2025 (KVIFF)
- Running time: 183 minutes
- Country: Spain
- Language: Catalan

When a River Becomes the Sea (Catalan: Quan un riu esdevé el mar) is a 2025 Spanish film directed by Catalan director Pere Vilà Barceló.

== Plot ==
Gaia (Claud Hernández), a student of archaeology, experiences trauma after being sexually assaulted by a friend. Facing difficulty recalling it and expressing herself, she withdraws from those closest to her, including her father (Àlex Brendemühl). Gaia commences a process of healing with the help of her professor (Bruna Cusí), gradually enabling her to recover and regain her sense of identity.

== Cast ==
- Claud Hernández as Gaia
- Àlex Brendemühl as Gaia's father
- Laia Marull as the mother of Gaia's friend
- Bruna Cusí as Gaia's professor

== Production ==
The film was produced by Xavier Pérez Díaz, who also co-edited it. It was co-written by Vilà Barceló and his wife Laura Merino. Vilà Barceló stated in an interview with the Hollywood Reporter that inspiration for creating the film emerged when he felt that he needed to use his facility as a filmmaker to address "gender-based violence" after meeting with victims of sexual abuse. He noted that he started developing the film approximately eight years prior to its release. Its production was delayed due to the COVID-19 pandemic.

== Release ==
Selected among the titles selected for the Crystal Globe Competition at the 59th Karlovy Vary International Film Festival (KVIFF), the film premiered on 8 July 2025. Àlex Brendemühl received the Best Actor award at the festival for the film. For its Spanish premiere, it made it to the 'Official Section' lineup of the 70th Valladolid International Film Festival (Seminci).

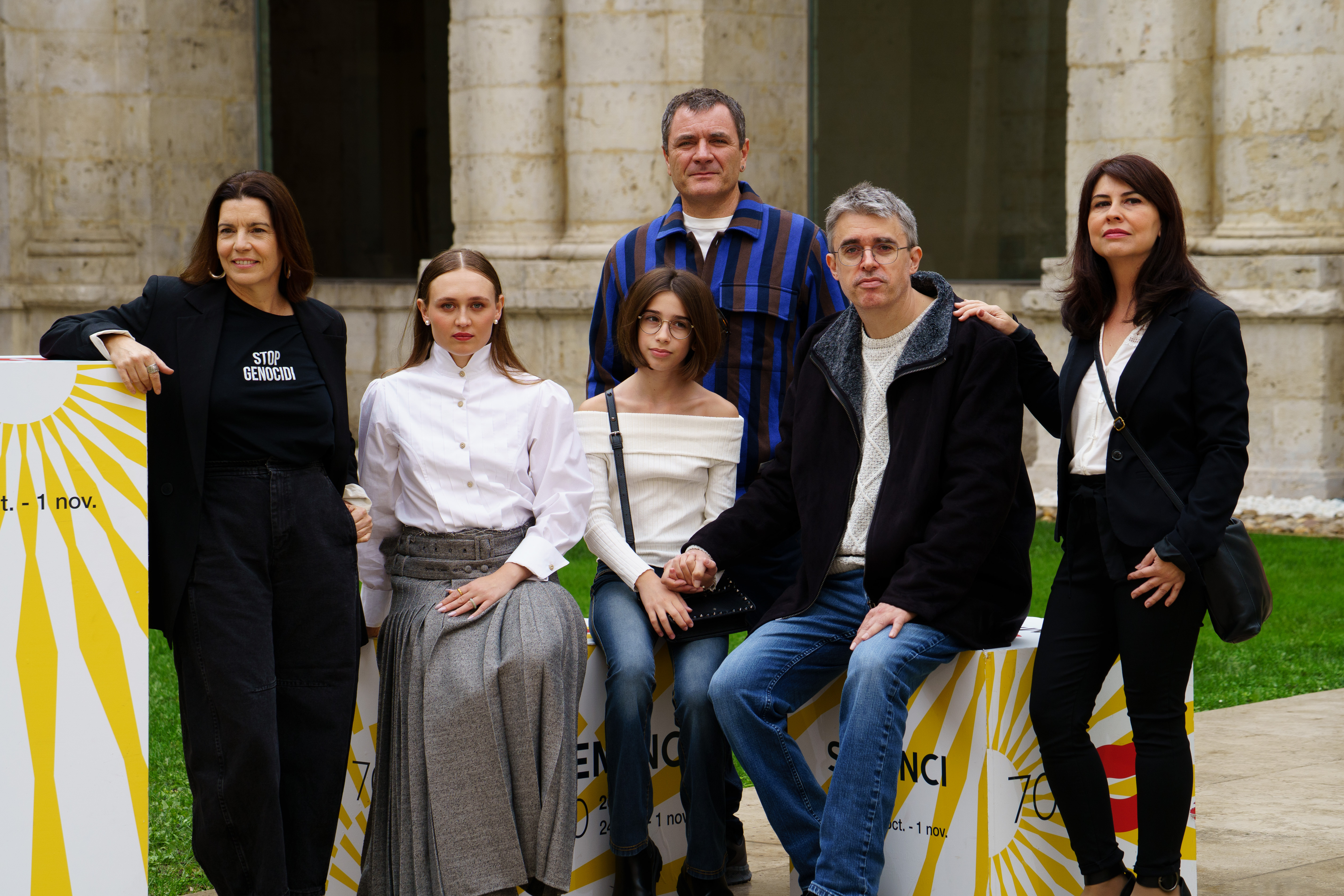
Cast and crew in the 70th Valladolid International Film Festival

== Reception ==
Veronica Orciari of Cineuropa described When a River Becomes the Sea as "a film that, paradoxically, is made up of two big absences, rather than presences. Its predominant characters are on screen for the whole length of the movie, but at the same time, the lack of a maternal figure for Gaia doesn't go unnoticed." She noted the cinematography as the "weakest aspect" of the film, describing it as "tad flat".

Guy Lodge, writing for Variety, remarked, "Not a message movie or afterschool special, When a River Becomes the Sea offers no prescriptive advice for victims or their loved ones in this worst of scenarios — just an honest portrayal of the ups and downs and agonizing stasis of trauma, and the hard work of living through it."

Sandra Hezinová of KVIFF noted the film as "an uncompromising, introspective probe into the soul of a girl who is sexually abused," opining that Vilà Barceló made a "realistic depiction" of the protagonist's story to "emphasize the actual process of coping with the trauma, a process which can't be rushed."
