= 5 Lies =

2007 Norwegian drama film

- Film poster
- Norwegian: 5 løgner
- Directed by: Lars Daniel Krutzkoff Jacobsen
- Written by: Lars Daniel Krutzkoff Jacobsen
- Starring: Pia Tjelta; Gard B. Eidsvold; Kim Sørensen
- Production company: Anders Tangen
- Distributed by: Scanbox
- Release date: 15 August 2007
- Running time: 97 minutes
- Country: Norway
- Language: Norwegian
- Budget: NOK 15 million

5 Lies (Norwegian: 5 Løgner) is a 2007 Norwegian drama film directed by Lars Daniel Krutzkoff Jacobsen, starring Pia Tjelta, Gard B. Eidsvold and Kim Sørensen. It follows five different people through the course of one day in Oslo.

== Synopsis ==
The film follows five people throughout a single day, showing how their lives intersect.

== Cast ==
- Michalis Koutsogiannakis as Ragnar
- Pia Tjelta as Maya
- Gard Eidsvold as Torgrim
- Kim Sørensen as Ulrik
- Jon Skolmen as Ole Gunnar
- Line Verndal as Angela
- Henrik Rafaelsen as Jørn
- Frank Kjosås as Stian
- Ingvild Lien as Rita
- Naeem Azam as Lege

== Production ==
5 Lies marked Jacobsen's feature film debut. He was given a budget of approximately NOK 14 million and Jacobsen intended for the film's main message to center around "the terror of good", which he described as "a political correctness where people increasingly have to suppress aspects of themselves to be accepted." Pia Tjelta was confirmed as one of the film's stars and would be portraying a mail order bride.

== Release ==
5 Lies was released on 15 August 2007 in Norway. It performed poorly at the box office, with NRK reporting that only 15,000 people had purchased tickets as of September of that year.

Jacobsen responded to the poor reception for 5 Lies, stating that "VG and Dagbladet tried to murder the child at the moment of birth" and calling the Norwegian audience "idiots".

== Reception ==
Critical reception for 5 Lies was lukewarm. Verdens Gang reviewed the film, writing that it was "extremely ambitious" but also "ran aground". ABC Nyheter gave it 6/10, criticizing it as uneven.
