= Atomised =

1998 novel by Michel Houellebecq

- UK edition cover
- Author: Michel Houellebecq
- Original title: Les Particules élémentaires
- Translator: Frank Wynne
- Language: French
- Genre: Science fiction
- Publisher: Groupe Flammarion
- Publication date: 1998
- Publication place: France
- English publication date: 2001

Atomised, also known as The Elementary Particles (French: Les Particules élémentaires), is a novel by the French author Michel Houellebecq, published in France in 1998. It tells the story of two half-brothers, Michel and Bruno, and their mental struggles against their situations in modern society. It was translated into English by Frank Wynne as Atomised in the UK and as The Elementary Particles in the US. It won the International Dublin Literary Award for writer and translator.

== Plot ==
Despite the essentially elaborate scope of the plot revealed in the novel's conclusion, the narrative focuses almost exclusively on the bleak and unrewarding day-to-day lives of the protagonists, two half-brothers who barely know each other. They seem devoid of love, and in their loveless or soon-to-be loveless journeys, Bruno becomes a saddened loner, wrecked by his upbringing and failure to individuate, while Michel's pioneering work in cloning removes love from the process of reproduction. Humans are proved, in the end, to be just particles and just as bodies decay (a theme in the book) they can also be created from particles.

The story unfolds as a sort of framed narrative. Despite the events described in the book having taken place mostly in 1999, the story is essentially set some 50 or so years in the future. A similar device was used by Kurt Vonnegut in the novel Galápagos; however, unlike Vonnegut, Houellebecq only reveals the frame to the reader in the epilogue. Large sections of the story are presented in the form of suppertime storytelling dialogues between Michel, his childhood sweetheart Annabelle, Bruno, and Bruno's post-divorce girlfriend Christiane.

The story focuses on the lives of Bruno Clément and Michel Djerzinski, two French half-brothers born of a hippie-type mother. Michel is raised by his paternal grandmother and becomes an introverted molecular biologist, who is ultimately responsible for the discoveries which lead to the elimination of sexual reproduction. Bruno's upbringing is much more tragic as described: shuffled and forgotten from one abusive boarding school to another, he eventually finds himself in a loveless marriage and teaching at a high school. Bruno grows into a lecherous and insatiable sex addict whose dalliances with prostitutes and sex chat on Minitel do nothing to satisfy him, to the point where he finds himself on disability leave from his job and in a mental hospital after a failed attempt at seducing one of his students.

== Reception ==
The novel sold hundreds of thousands of copies and propelled Houellebecq into the French intellectual and literary spotlight during the summer and autumn of 1998. The vivid, almost pornographic, sexual descriptions were a frequent target of criticism, and Houellebecq himself attracted both scorn and praise for his erratic proclamations and behaviour in television interviews and the like. The author was eventually awarded the Prix Novembre in recognition of the novel. He became the last one to get this prize under this name. Philippe Dennery, the founder of the Prix Novembre, disapproved of awarding the prize to Houellebecq and resigned; the prize got a new patron—Pierre Bergé—and a new name: Prix Décembre.

In April 2008, Houellebecq's estranged mother, Lucie Ceccaldi, returned to France to publish The Innocent One, a rebuttal of his alleged mis-characterization of her parenting as contained in the novel. In press interviews, she promised that "if he has the misfortune of sticking my name on anything again he'll get my walking stick in his face and that'll knock his teeth out."

== Adaptations ==
The German film adaptation Atomised premiered at the 2006 Berlin Film Festival and won the Silver Bear award. It was directed by Oskar Roehler and had reportedly been sold to distributors in 23 countries within days of its premiere at the Berlin Film Festival. The cast includes Moritz Bleibtreu (Bruno), Christian Ulmen (Michel), Franka Potente (Annabelle), and Martina Gedeck (Christiane).

Julien Gosselin adapted the novel into the play Les Particules élémentaires which premiered at the 2013 Festival d'Avignon.

France 2 produced the television film The Elementary Particles which was directed by Antoine Garceau and stars Guillaume Gouix and Jean-Charles Clichet. It was broadcast on 31 January 2022.
