= The Kings of the World (2015 film) =

- Film poster
- French: Les Rois du monde
- Directed by: Laurent Laffargue
- Written by: Laurent Laffargue; Frédérique Moreau
- Produced by: Mathieu Bompoint
- Starring: Sergi López; Céline Sallette; Eric Cantona; Romane Bohringer; Guillaume Gouix
- Cinematography: Fabrice Main
- Edited by: Marie-Julie Maille
- Production company: Mezzanine Films
- Distributed by: Jour2Fête
- Release date: 23 September 2015
- Running time: 100 minutes
- Country: France
- Language: French

The Kings of the World (French: Les Rois du monde) is a 2015 French drama film directed by Laurent Laffargue and co-written by Laffargue and Frédérique Moreau. It stars Sergi López, Céline Sallette, Eric Cantona, Romane Bohringer and Guillaume Gouix.

== Cast ==
- Sergi López as Jeannot
- Céline Sallette as Chantal
- Eric Cantona as Jacky
- Romane Bohringer as Marie-Jo
- Guillaume Gouix as Jean-François
- Victorien Cacioppo as Romain
- Roxane Arnal as Pascaline
- Jean-Baptiste Sagory as Thibault
