= Blind Spot (2018 film) =

- Film poster
- Blindsone
- Directed by: Tuva Novotny
- Written by: Tuva Novotny
- Produced by: Elisabeth Kvithyll
- Starring: Pia Tjelta; Oddgeir Thune; Per Frisch; Marianne Krogh; Anders Baasmo Christiansen
- Cinematography: Jonas Alarik
- Distributed by: Nordisk Film
- Release date: 24 August 2018 (Norway)
- Running time: 98 minutes
- Country: Norway
- Language: Norwegian
- Box office: $241,031

Blind Spot (Norwegian: Blindsone) is a 2018 Norwegian drama film directed and written by Tuva Novotny. It was one of three films shortlisted to be the Norwegian entry for the Best International Feature Film at the 91st Academy Awards.

Filmed in one shot, Blind Spot tells the story of a mother who struggles to come to terms with her daughter's mental illness, revealed to be far worse than she had realised.

== Plot ==
The film opens as Thea leaves a handball practice with a friend. She arrives at home where her mother, Marie, is putting her younger brother to bed. Thea makes a phone call to her father, Anders, but he does not answer. She then enters her bedroom, makes an entry to her diary, and jumps out the window (which is on the 4th floor of an apartment building). Marie quickly realizes what has happened and rushes out. She finds Thea badly injured from the fall and screams for help. Her father and mother in law, Hasse and Mona, happen to be close by and come to her aid. An ambulance arrives, and Marie and Hasse follow Thea to the hospital.

At the hospital, Marie and Hasse are greeted by Martin, a nurse who specializes in care for patient's relatives. Anders soon arrives and hysterically demands to see his daughter. Marie and Anders are allowed to see Thea as the trauma team operates on her, but Anders passes out at the sight. Marie, Anders and Hasse are placed in a room and wait for the trauma surgeon to give a report on Thea's condition. Martin, reading from Thea's medical record, realizes that Marie is her adoptive mother, and that her biological mother committed suicide. When asked about this, Anders and Marie insist that Thea had been treated by a psychologist and that she has shown no signs of depression or suicidal tendencies.

The trauma surgeon gives his report and breaks the news that they are uncertain if they will be able to save Thea's life. Marie, unable to remain in the hospital, decides to go home and wait. Back at home, she enters Thea's bedroom and looks through her belongings. She finds the diary, and breaks down after reading it. She lays down in Thea's bed crying and the film cuts to black.

== Cast ==
- Pia Tjelta as Marie
- Anders Baasmo Christiansen as Anders
- Oddgeir Thune as Maritin
- Per Frisch as Hasse
- Marianne Krogh as Mona
- Nora Mathea Øien as Thea

== Production ==
Blind Spot (Norwegian: Blindsone) was directed and written by Tuva Novotny, and made in Norway.

The entire film was filmed in one shot.

== Release ==
Blind Spot had its world premiere in August 2018 in Haugesund, Norway, and was screened at the Toronto International Film Festival, CPH PIX in Copenhagen, at the 66th San Sebastián International Film Festival.

== Awards and recognition ==
Blind Spot was one of three films shortlisted to be the Norwegian entry for the Best International Feature Film at the 91st Academy Awards.

- New Talent Grand Prix award at CPH PIX festival for Novotny
- Silver Shell for Best Actress at San Sebastian for Pia Tjelta's performance
