= The Elementary Particles (2021 film) =

- Based on: Atomised by Michel Houellebecq
- Screenplay by: Gilles Taurand
- Directed by: Antoine Garceau
- Starring: Guillaume Gouix; Jean-Charles Clichet
- Music by: Yuksek
- Country of origin: France
- Original language: French

Production
- Cinematography: Antoine Roch
- Running time: 118 minutes

Original release
- Network: France 2
- Release: 31 January 2022

The Elementary Particles (French: Les Particules élémentaires) is a 2021 French television drama film directed by Antoine Garceau for France 2. It is based on the novel Atomised by Michel Houellebecq and has a screenplay by Gilles Taurand. It stars Guillaume Gouix and Jean-Charles Clichet and tells the story of two half brothers, where the first half of the film is about their adolescence and the second is about them as adults.

It premiered on 17 September 2021 at the Festival La Rochelle Cinéma, where it was shown out of competition as a two-part television film. It was changed into one film of 1 hour and 58 minutes before it was shown on France 2 on 31 January 2022. It had 2 million viewers, which was 10% of the viewership.
