= East European Film Bulletin =

- Language: English
- Edited by: Konstanty Kuzma; Moritz Pfeifer

Publication details
- History: 2011
- Frequency: 10/year
- Open access: yes

Standard abbreviations
- ISO 4: East Eur. Film Bull.

Indexing
- ISSN: 1775-3635

East European Film Bulletin is a not-for-profit online journal dedicated to the criticism of films related to Central, Eastern and South-Eastern Europe, published 10 times a year.

== History ==
On 1 January 2011, in Paris, France, East European Film Bulletin was launched online. Co-founders and co-editors-in-chief are Konstanty Kuzma and Moritz Pfeifer.

ISSN 1775-3635

== See also ==
- List of film periodicals
