= Sand City (2025 film) =

- Film poster
- Directed by: Mahde Hasan
- Written by: Mahde Hasan
- Produced by: Rubaiyat Hossain; Aadnan Imtiaz Ahmed, Mahajabin Khan (Co-producer); Mahde Hasan (Co-producer)
- Starring: Mostafa Monwar; Victoria Chakma; Javed Kaiser; Apel Pavel; Satej Chowdhury; Mashrawi Muhammadi; Sajeeb A G
- Cinematography: Mathieu Giombini
- Edited by: Mahde Hasan
- Production companies: Khona Talkies; Cinema Cocoon
- Release date: 7 July 2025 (KVIFF)
- Running time: 100 minutes
- Country: Bangladesh
- Language: Bengali

Sand City (বালুর নগরীতে) is a 2025 Bangladeshi drama film directed by Mahde Hasan. The debut feature premiered in the Proxima Competition at the 59th Karlovy Vary International Film Festival on 7 July and won the PROXIMA Grand Prix.

== Plot ==
Two parallel stories about two individuals. An ethnic minority woman and a man from the majority population. They are not directly related. Only one thing is common in their life is SAND.

Emma, the film's female protagonist, collects sand for her cat litter. She sets out on her scooter every week and picks up her litter’s fill of sand. One day, she discovers a finger in the sand—an severed finger with a crimson painted nail. Rather than panicking, she gradually develops an unusual attachment with the lone finger.

Hasan, on the other hand, works in a sand-washing plant. He steals sand from the plant to make glass at home and dreams of building his own massive glass factory. What begins as a solitary activity, soon leads to a fantasy that gradually destroys him.

== Cast ==
- Mostafa Monwar as Hasan
- Victoria Chakma as Emma
- Javed Kaiser
- Apel Pavel
- Satej Chowdhury
- Mashrawi Muhammadi
- Sajeeb A G

== Production ==
Produced by Rubaiyat Hossain and Aadnan Imtiaz Ahmed under Khona Talkies in association with Cinema Cocoon, the project received development support from:

- CNC Development Award at Locarno Open Doors
- La Fabrique Cinéma of the Institut français
- Produire au Sud at Nantes
- Film Bazaar (India)
- Visions Sud Est foundation
- Film Independent

Principal photography featured key technical contributions:

- Cinematography by Mathieu Giombini
- Art Direction by Rainirr Borshon
- Sound design by Oronnok Prithibi
- Re-recording mix by Uttam Neupane
- Costume design by Chowdhury Nowrin Ferdous

The production was co-produced by Mahajabin Khan and director Mahde Hasan and Cinema Cocoon.

== Release ==
=== Festival screenings ===
The film premiered in competition at:

- Proxima Competition - 59th Karlovy Vary International Film Festival (World premiere, 2025)

Worldwide sales are handled by Diversion Sales (Thailand).

== Accolades ==
| Year | Award | Category | Recipient(s) | Result | Ref |
|---|---|---|---|---|---|
| 2025 | Karlovy Vary International Film Festival | Proxima Grand Prix | Sand City | Won | |
