= Guillaume Gouix =

French actor, director, and screenwriter (born 1983)

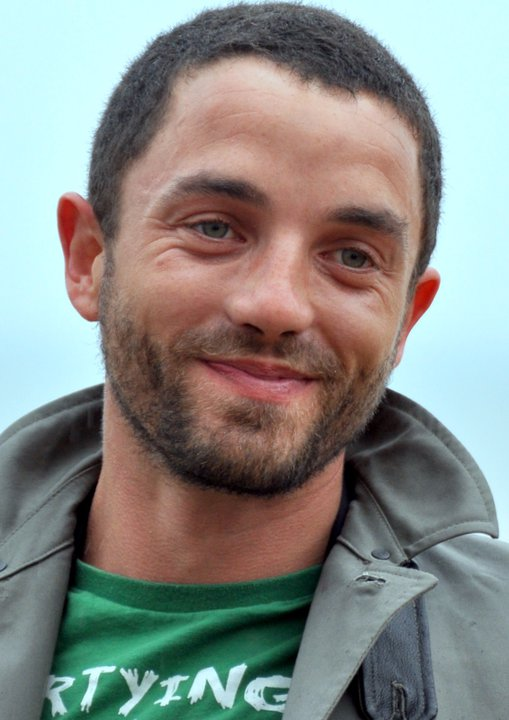
- Gouix in 2011
- Born: 30 November 1983 (age 42); Aix-en-Provence, Bouches-du-Rhône, France
- Occupations: Actor, director, screenwriter
- Years active: 1998–present
- Partner: Alysson Paradis (2014–present)
- Children: 2

Guillaume Gouix (French: [ɡwiks]; born 30 November 1983) is a French actor, director and screenwriter. He starred in the limited television series Gone for Good (2021).

== Career ==
Guillaume Gouix learned acting at the Conservatory of Marseille, then at the Regional School of actors of Cannes.

On stage, he often works with directors such as Didier Galas, Jean-Pierre Vincent and Bruno Bayen.

Gouix made his big screen debut in the film Deuxième quinzaine de juillet directed by Christophe Reichert. He is also known for the role of Serge in the TV series The Returned.

== Personal life ==
Since 2014, Gouix has been in a relationship with French actress Alysson Paradis. In September 2015, the couple's first child, a son, was born. On 22 April 2022, Paradis announced that she's expecting her second child with Gouix. In August 2022, she gave birth to their second child.

== Filmography ==
=== Film ===
Year	Title	Role	Director	Notes
2000	Deuxième quinzaine de juillet	Kevin	Christophe Reichert	
2003	Les lionceaux	Gustave	Claire Doyon	
2005	Les mauvais joueurs	Kid with the beard	Frédéric Balekdjian	
2006	Chacun sa nuit	Romain	Pascal Arnold & Jean-Marc Barr	
2007	Trivial	Young cashier	Sophie Marceau	
2007	Intimate Enemies	Delmas	Florent Emilio Siri	
2007	Darling	Joseph	Christine Carrière	
2008	Behind the Walls	Blondeau	Christian Faure	Original title: Les Hauts Murs
2008	Des hommes	The Butcher	Romain Cogitore	Short film
2009	Réfractaire	René	Nicolas Steil	
2009	L'insurgée	Simon	Laurent Perreau	
2010	22 Bullets	The Morvelous	Richard Berry	
2010	Belle Épine	Reynald	Rebecca Zlotowski	
2010	Copacabana	Kurt	Marc Fitoussi	
2010	Dimanche matin	Olivier	Grégoire Leprince-Ringuet	Short film
2010	Les Briques de Sang		Jean-Baptiste Pouilloux	Short film
2010	Le Rodba	Matteo	Hafsia Herzi	Short film
2011	Nobody Else But You	Bruno Leloup	Gérald Hustache-Mathieu	
2011	Jimmy Rivière	Jimmy Rivière	Teddy Lussi-Modeste	Nominated - César Award for Most Promising Actor; Nominated - Lumière Award for Most Promising Actor
2011	Et soudain, tout le monde me manque	Sami	Jennifer Devoldère	
2011	Midnight in Paris	Partygoer	Woody Allen	
2012	Alyah	Mathias	Elie Wajeman	
2012	Beyond the Walls	Ilir	David Lambert	
2012	Mobile Home	Julien	François Pirot	
2013	Attila Marcel	Paul	Sylvain Chomet	Beijing International Film Festival - Best Actor
2014	Sous les jupes des filles	Ysis's husband	Audrey Dana	
2014	The Connection	José Alvarez	Cédric Jimenez	
2015	Le talent de mes amis	The ambulance	Alex Lutz	
2015	Learn by Heart	Stanislas Mauger	Mathieu Vadepied	
2015	The Anarchists	Eugène Levèque	Elie Wajeman (2)	
2015	Rabid Dogs	Sabri	Éric Hannezo	
2015	Les Rois du monde	Jean-François	Laurent Laffargue	
2015	Braqueurs	Éric	Julien Leclercq	
2017	This Is Our Land	Stéphane Stankowiak "Stanko"	Lucas Belvaux	
2017	Gaspard at the Wedding	Virgile		
2018	To the Ends of the World		Guillaume Nicloux	
2019	Who You Think I Am	Ludovic Dalaux	Safy Nebbou	
2019	Queens of the Field	Franck	Mohamed Hamidi	
2020	Love Affair(s)	Gaspard	Emmanuel Mouret	
2021	Mauvaise troupe	Tony	Nolwenn Lemesle	Short film
2023	Rosalie	Pierre	Stéphanie Di Giusto	
2023	Toni	Le médecin	Nathan Ambrosioni	
2025	Out of Love		Nathan Ambrosioni	Les enfants vont bien

=== Television ===
Year	Title	Role	Notes
1998	Marseille	Young Juan	Episode: "Deux gosses et un piano"
2000	L'avocate	Jean-Jean	Episode: "Les fruits de la haine"
2001	Dérives	Tony	TV film
2003	Des épaules solides	Rudi	TV film
2006–2010	Les Bleus	Marco	8 episodes
2007	Ravages	Vincent	TV film
2008	Le silence de l'épervier	Daniel	4 episodes
2008	Chez Maupassant	Charlot Tuvache	Episode: "Aux Champs"
2008	Sur le fil	Milo Slovic	Episode: "Père et fils"
2010	Mon père, Francis le Belge	Denis / Aunt Paulette	TV film
2011	Faux coupable		TV film
2011	Les beaux mecs	Young Guido	3 episodes
2012	The Returned	Serge	8 episodes
2013	Le débarquement	Various	Episode #1.2
2014	Pilules bleues	Jean-Baptiste	TV film
2019	War of the Worlds	Noah	3 episodes
2021	Gone for Good	Jérémie Da Costa	5 episodes
2021	The Elementary Particles	Bruno Clément	2 episodes
2021	A French Case	Jean-Marie Villemin	6 episodes
2021	Profession comédien	Himself	1 episode
2021	L'Invitation	Nicolas Gravel	TV film
2023	Polar Park	Adjudant Louvetot	6 episodes
2025	Under a Dark Sun	Mathieu Lasserre	6 episodes
TBA	Fortune de France	Jean de Sauveterre	Miniseries; in production
